= San Francisco 49ers all-time roster (A–K) =

1,581 players have appeared in at least one regular season or postseason game in the National Football League (NFL) or All-America Football Conference (AAFC) for the San Francisco 49ers since 1946. This list includes those whose last names fall between "A" and "K". For the rest of the players, see San Francisco 49ers all-time roster (L–Z). This list is accurate through the end of the 2025 NFL season.

== A ==
- Danny Abramowicz
- Kenneth Acker
- Anthony Adams
- Mike Adams
- Phillip Adams
- Tyrell Adams
- Chidi Ahanotu
- Brandon Aiyuk
- David Akers
- Frankie Albert
- Ben Aldridge
- Jerry Aldridge
- Kermit Alexander
- Kwon Alexander
- Brandon Allen
- Brian Allen
- Larry Allen
- Nate Allen
- Azeez Al-Shaair
- Otis Amey
- Adrian Amos
- Evan Anderson
- Gary Anderson
- Marques Anderson
- Terry Anderson
- William Anderson
- Shane Andrus
- Mark Anelli
- Ezekiel Ansah
- Cornelius Anthony
- Eli Apple
- Joe Arenas
- Arik Armstead
- Ray-Ray Armstrong
- Jim Asmus
- Nnamdi Asomugha
- Bill Atkins
- Dave Atkins
- James Atkins
- Dan Audick
- John Ayers

== B ==
- David Baas
- Gene Babb
- Harry Babcock
- Ken Bahnsen
- Matt Bahr
- Billy Bajema
- Dave Baker
- Jason Baker
- Wayne Baker
- Eric Bakhtiari
- Ed Balatti
- Mike Baldassin
- Alex Balducci
- Jack Baldwin
- Jon Baldwin
- Marcus Ball
- Kentwan Balmer
- Cas Banaszek
- Bruno Banducci
- Aaron Banks
- Tully Banta-Cain
- Michael Barber
- Roy Barker
- Kevan Barlow
- Larry Barnes
- Pat Barnes
- Tim Barnes
- Oliver Barnett
- Alex Barrett
- Jean Barrett
- Ben Bartch
- Harris Barton
- Dick Bassi
- Arnaz Battle
- Sanjay Beach
- Zane Beadles
- Robert Beal Jr.
- Alyn Beals
- Ed Beard
- Fred Beasley
- Terry Beasley
- C. J. Beathard
- Ed Beatty
- Terry Beeson
- Randy Beisler
- Bill Belk
- Blake Bell
- Ronnie Bell
- Shonn Bell
- Nick Bellore
- Caesar Belser
- Daved Benefield
- Guy Benjamin
- Travis Benjamin
- Roman Bentz
- Tony Bergstrom
- Rex Berry
- Antoine Bethea
- Tatum Bethune
- Mike Bettiga
- Ed Beverly
- Desmond Bishop
- Stan Black
- Richard Blackmore
- Ronald Blair
- Tony Blevins
- Ed Blount
- Forrest Blue
- Dré Bly
- Dwaine Board
- Harry Boatswain
- Briean Boddy-Calhoun
- Victor Bolden
- Anquan Boldin
- Brian Bollinger
- Shane Bonham
- Steve Bono
- Alex Boone
- J. R. Boone
- Chris Borland
- Nick Bosa
- Bruce Bosley
- Kendrick Bourne
- Matt Bouza
- Todd Bowles
- NaVorro Bowman
- Elmo Boyd
- Greg Boyd
- Lon Boyett
- Greg Boykin
- Carl Bradford
- Ed Bradley
- Dennis Bragonier
- John Brandes
- Michael Brandon
- Jeff Bregel
- Matt Breida
- Jake Brendel
- Doug Brien
- Diyral Briggs
- John Bristor
- Clyde Brock
- Tramaine Brock
- Jeff Brockhaus
- John Brodie
- Jeff Brohm
- Zack Bronson
- Ahmad Brooks
- Chet Brooks
- Anthony Brown
- Dennis Brown
- Hardy Brown
- Jamie Brown
- Ji'Ayir Brown
- Pete Brown
- Ray Brown (born 1962)
- Ray Brown (born 1965)
- Tarell Brown
- Tony Brown
- Trent Brown
- Keith Browner
- Arland Bruce III
- Gail Bruce
- Isaac Bruce
- Bob Bruer
- Jack Brumfield
- Fred Bruney
- Daniel Brunskill
- Antonio Bryant
- Austin Bryant
- Bob Bryant
- Junior Bryant
- Jeff Buckey
- Curtis Buckley
- Brentson Buckner
- DeForest Buckner
- Scott Bull
- Ken Bungarda
- Dan Bunz
- Aaron Burbridge
- Spencer Burford
- Don Burke
- Vern Burke
- Oren Burks
- Mike Burns
- Jim Burt
- Reggie Bush
- Steve Bush
- John Butler
- Nate Byham

== C ==
- Travaris Cadet
- Mike Caldwell
- Ravin Caldwell
- Mike Calhoun
- Dean Caliguire
- Tony Calvelli
- Carter Campbell
- De'Vondre Campbell
- Marion Campbell
- Don Campora
- Trenton Cannon
- Al Carapella
- Anders Carlson
- Brett Carolan
- Dwaine Carpenter
- Jack Carpenter
- David Carr
- Earl Carr
- Eddie Carr
- Paul Carr
- Cornellius Carradine
- Derek Carrier
- Andre Carter
- Dexter Carter
- Michael Carter
- Ken Casanega
- Bernie Casey
- Jim Cason
- Frank Cassara
- Royal Cathcart
- Sam Cathcart
- Matt Cavanaugh
- Garrett Celek
- Gordy Ceresino
- Joe Cerne
- Jeff Chandler
- Wes Chandler
- Jack Chapple
- Tony Cherry
- John Choma
- Ricky Churchman
- Don Clark
- Dwight Clark
- Greg Clark
- Mario Clark
- Mike Clark
- Monte Clark
- DeVone Claybrooks
- Anthony Clement
- Nate Clements
- Asante Cleveland
- Tony Cline
- Tony Cline Jr.
- Colin Cloherty
- Josiah Coatney
- Mark Cochran
- Mike Cofer
- Glen Coffee
- Adrian Colbert
- Connor Colby
- Dan Colchico
- Matt Cole
- Tevin Coleman
- Elmer Collett
- Bruce Collie
- Floyd Collier
- Tim Collier
- Alfred Collins
- Glen Collins
- Greg Collins
- Maliek Collins
- Ray Collins
- Darren Comeaux
- Tom Compton
- Jon Condo
- Cary Conklin
- Gerry Conlee
- Chris Conley
- Mike Connell
- Clyde Conner
- Ted Connolly
- Curtis Conway
- Chris Cook
- Toi Cook
- Bill Cooke
- Adrian Cooper
- Bill Cooper
- Chris Cooper
- Deke Cooper
- Earl Cooper
- George Cooper
- Josh Cooper
- Xavier Cooper
- Lou Cordileone
- Charles Cornelius
- José Cortéz
- Dave Costa
- Blake Costanzo
- Matt Courtney
- Tom Cousineau
- Jacob Cowing
- Al Cowlings
- Greg Cox
- Jim Cox
- Perrish Cox
- Brock Coyle
- Michael Crabtree
- River Cracraft
- Roger Craig
- Derrick Crawford
- Gabe Crecion
- Joe Cribbs
- Chuck Crist
- Marcus Cromartie
- Bobby Cross
- Randy Cross
- John David Crow
- Paul Crowe
- Odis Crowell
- Dave Cullity
- Chris Culliver
- Doug Cunningham
- Johnathan Cyprien

== D ==
- Craig Dahl
- Harvey Dahl
- Tom Dahms
- Chris Dalman
- Clem Daniels
- Darrion Daniels
- Sam Darnold
- Bob Daugherty
- Anthony Davis
- Chris Davis
- Eric Davis
- Jerome Davis
- Jesse Davis
- Johnny Davis
- Kalia Davis
- Khalil Davis
- Kyle Davis
- Leonard Davis
- Mike Davis
- Sammy Davis
- Tommy Davis
- Vernon Davis
- Tyrion Davis-Price
- Phil Dawson
- Sheldon Day
- Matthew Dayes
- Floyd Dean
- Fred Dean
- Kevin Dean
- Steve DeBerg
- Derrick Deese
- Ryan Delaire
- Keith DeLong
- Darqueze Dennard
- Richard Dent
- Dan Dercher
- Ty Detmer
- Jordan Devey
- Quinton Dial
- Trent Dilfer
- Al Dixon
- Anthony Dixon
- Demarcus Dobbs
- Joshua Dobbs
- Dedrick Dodge
- Chris Doleman
- Marty Domres
- Mitch Donahue
- George Donnelly
- Leon Donohue
- Glenn Dorsey
- Ken Dorsey
- Marques Douglas
- Leger Douzable
- Eddie Dove
- Harley Dow
- Mike Dowdle
- Walt Downing
- Bob Downs
- Chris Draft
- Joe Drake
- Tyronne Drakeford
- Shaun Draughn
- Jim Dray
- Chris Dressel
- Jim Druckenmiller
- Doug DuBose
- Damane Duckett
- Fred Dugan
- Elvis Dumervil
- Steven Dunbar
- Maury Duncan
- Tony Dungy
- Don Durdan
- Mike Durrette
- Ross Dwelley
- Michael Dwumfour

== E ==
- Walt Easley
- Samson Ebukam
- Braylon Edwards
- Earl Edwards
- Marc Edwards
- Cleveland Elam
- Shane Elam
- Bruce Elia
- Bruce Ellington
- Charlie Elliott
- Jordan Elliott
- Lenvil Elliott
- Riki Ellison
- Dutch Elston
- Ben Emanuel
- Dick Enderle
- Al Endress
- John Engelberger
- Ricky Ervins
- Len Eshmont
- Patrick Estes
- LeRoy Etienne
- Demetric Evans
- Paul Evansen
- Ray Evans
- Antone Exum

== F ==
- Kevin Fagan
- Jim Fahnhorst
- Keith Fahnhorst
- Chad Fann
- Dillon Farrell
- Luke Farrell
- Brett Faryniarz
- John Faylor
- Nick Feher
- Jon Feliciano
- Ron Ferrari
- Bob Ferrell
- Clelin Ferrell
- Ronald Fields
- Dave Fiore
- Bill Fisk
- Terrence Flagler
- Jim Flanigan
- Demetrius Flannigan-Fowles
- P. J. Fleck
- Mike Flores
- Leonard Floyd
- William Floyd
- Dee Ford
- Jay Foreman
- Eddie Forrest
- DeShaun Foster
- Reuben Foster
- Roy Foster
- Jamal Fountaine
- Pete Franceschi
- Phil Francis
- Russ Francis
- John Frank
- Aubrayo Franklin
- Tracy Franz
- Jesse Freitas
- Jeff Fuller
- Johnny Fuller
- Brandon Fusco

== G ==
- Blaine Gabbert
- Russell Gage
- Bob Gagliano
- Bob Gaiters
- Arnold Galiffa
- Ed Galigher
- Jeff Garcia
- Pierre Garçon
- Andrew Gardner
- Ben Garland
- Don Garlin
- Charlie Garner
- Joshua Garnett
- Scott Garnett
- Jimmy Garoppolo
- Len Garrett
- Terence Garvin
- Thane Gash
- Kendall Gaskins
- Momčilo Gavrić
- Matt Gay
- Fred Gehrke
- Rick Gervais
- Thaddeus Gibson
- Luke Gifford
- Lewis Gilbert
- Garry Gilliam
- Bryan Gilmore
- Ted Ginn Jr.
- Tashaun Gipson
- Trevis Gipson
- Kevin Givens
- Reggie Givens
- Tony Gladney
- Clyde Glover
- Paul Goad
- Kevin Gogan
- Dashon Goldson
- Goose Gonsoulin
- John Gonzaga
- Tavares Gooden
- Jonathan Goodwin
- Marquise Goodwin
- Steve Gordon
- Frank Gore
- Antonio Goss
- Bruce Gossett
- Robbie Gould
- Scott Gragg
- Jalen Graham
- Alan Grant
- Larry Grant
- Hroniss Grasu
- Danny Gray
- Tim Gray
- Elvis Grbac
- Jacob Green
- Renardo Green
- Roderick Green
- Kevin Greene
- Dre Greenlaw
- Fritz Greenlee
- Terry Greer
- Garland Gregory
- Randy Gregory
- Visco Grgich
- Don Griffin
- Yetur Gross-Matos
- Isaac Guerendo
- Brock Gutierrez
- Sebastian Gutierrez

== H ==
- Ron Hadley
- Clark Haggans
- Charles Haley
- Chad Hall
- Dana Hall
- Darryl Hall
- Forrest Hall
- Leon Hall
- Parker Hall
- Rhett Hall
- Travis Hall
- Windlan Hall
- Derrick Hamilton
- Je'Ron Hamm
- Blake Hance
- Merton Hanks
- Tim Hanshaw
- Joselio Hanson
- Bob Hantla
- Parys Haralson
- Cedrick Hardman
- Adrian Hardy
- Andre Hardy
- Carroll Hardy
- Ed Hardy
- Kevin Hardy
- Javon Hargrave
- Lem Harkey
- Derrick Harmon
- Eli Harold
- Chris Harper
- Willie Harper
- Davontae Harris
- DuJuan Harris
- Erik Harris
- Joe Harris
- Kwame Harris
- Marcell Harris
- Mark Harris
- Marques Harris
- Tim Harris (born 1964)
- Tim Harris (born 1995)
- Tony Harris
- Walt Harris
- Bob Harrison
- Dennis Harrison
- Kenny Harrison
- Martin Harrison
- Jeff Hart
- Taylor Hart
- Tommy Hart
- John Harty
- Joe Hastings
- Jamycal Hasty
- Tim Hauck
- Tayler Hawkins
- Duane Hawthorne
- Bob Hayes
- Jarryd Hayne
- Harold Hays
- Matt Hazeltine
- Ronnie Heard
- Garrison Hearst
- Charlie Heck
- Eric Heitmann
- Ron Heller
- Daniel Helm
- Barry Helton
- Keith Henderson
- Thomas Henderson
- Steve Hendrickson
- Ed Henke
- Thomas Henley
- Matt Hennessy
- Willie Henry
- Bill Herchman
- Chris Hetherington
- Dave Hettema
- Dwight Hicks
- Maurice Hicks
- Cole Hikutini
- Brian Hill
- Jason Hill
- John Hill
- Shaun Hill
- Scott Hilton
- Stan Hindman
- Terry Hoage
- Homer Hobbs
- Nate Hobgood-Chittick
- Gerald Hodges
- Paul Hofer
- Gary Hoffman
- Mike Hogan
- Doug Hogland
- Colin Holba
- Bob Holladay
- Hugo Hollas
- Trindon Holliday
- Rashad Holman
- Mike Holmes
- Tom Holmoe
- Pierce Holt
- Tom Holzer
- Tyrone Hopson
- Bob Horn
- Dick Horne
- Bob Hoskins
- Eddie Howard
- Clarence Howell
- Brian Hoyer
- Marcus Hudson
- Tanner Hudson
- Talanoa Hufanga
- Bryce Huff
- Marty Huff
- Ernie Hughes
- Tom Hull
- Charlie Hunt
- Kendall Hunter
- Maurice Hurst Jr.
- Carlos Hyde
- Kerry Hyder

== I ==
- Israel Ifeanyi
- Godwin Igwebuike
- John Isenbarger
- Jasen Isom
- Steve Israel
- Mike Iupati
- Prince Charles Iworah

== J ==
- Asa Jackson
- Darrell Jackson
- Drake Jackson
- Jim Jackson
- Johnnie Jackson
- Randy Jackson
- Rickey Jackson
- Terry Jackson
- Wilbur Jackson
- Brandon Jacobs
- Taylor Jacobs
- Jordan James
- LaMichael James
- Richie James
- Shemar Jean-Charles
- Ricky Jean-Francois
- Jordan Jefferson
- Tony Jefferson
- A. J. Jenkins
- Janoris Jenkins
- Brian Jennings
- Jauan Jennings
- Jonas Jennings
- Rick Jennings
- Tony Jerod-Eddie
- Lorenzo Jerome
- Travis Jervey
- Bill Jessup
- Greg Joelson
- Bill Johnson
- Bryant Johnson
- Cam Johnson
- Charles Johnson
- Charlie Johnson
- Dennis Johnson
- Derrick Johnson
- Dontae Johnson
- Eric Johnson
- Eric Johnson
- Gary Johnson
- James Johnson
- Jimmy Johnson
- John Johnson
- John Henry Johnson
- Josh Johnson
- Kermit Johnson
- Kerryon Johnson
- Lee Johnson
- Rudy Johnson
- Sammy Johnson
- Stevie Johnson
- Walter Johnson
- Arrington Jones
- Brandon Jones
- Brent Jones
- Chris Jones
- Colin Jones
- Datone Jones
- D. J. Jones
- Larry Jones
- Mac Jones
- Terry Jones
- Darin Jordan
- Dion Jordan
- James Jordan
- Alex Joseph
- Sebastian Joseph-Day
- Ed Judie
- Bob Jury
- Kyle Juszczyk

== K ==
- Colin Kaepernick
- Carl Kammerer
- Zak Keasey
- Jerry Keeble
- Carl Keever
- John Keith
- Louie Kelcher
- Gorden Kelley
- Todd Kelly
- Larry Kelm
- Jeff Kemp
- Eric Kendricks
- Matt Keneley
- Allan Kennedy
- Sam Kennedy
- Jeremy Kerley
- Zach Kerr
- Arden Key
- Daniel Kilgore
- Jon Kilgore
- Terry Killens
- Cedric Killings
- Billy Kilmer
- Elbert Kimbrough
- Javon Kinlaw
- Terry Kirby
- Randy Kirk
- Dre Kirkpatrick
- Travis Kirschke
- David Kirtman
- George Kittle
- Gary Knafelc
- Steve Knutson
- David Kopay
- Mark Korff
- Kyle Kosier
- Jim Kovach
- Eldred Kraemer
- Jim Krahl
- Kent Kramer
- Keaton Kristick
- Tyler Kroft
- Charlie Krueger
- Rolf Krueger
- Pete Kugler
- Fulton Kuykendall
- John Kuzman
- Ted Kwalick
- Jason Kyle
