= 1950 San Francisco 49ers season =

American football team season

- Owner: Tony Morabito
- General manager: John Blackinger
- Head coach: Buck Shaw
- Home stadium: Kezar Stadium

Results
- Record: 3–9
- Conference place: T–5th NFL National
- Playoffs: Did not qualify

The 1950 San Francisco 49ers season was the franchise's 1st season in the National Football League and their 5th overall. After playing the previous four years in the All-America Football Conference (AAFC), which folded after the 1949 season, the 49ers, Baltimore Colts, and Cleveland Browns all joined the NFL from the AAFC.

San Francisco's first NFL game was at Kezar Stadium on September 17 against the New York Yanks, as the 49ers fell short, losing by a score of 21–17. They started the season 0–5 before recording their first NFL victory in a 28–27 win over the Detroit Lions at home. The Niners played better after the 0–5 start, went 3–4 in their remaining 7 games to finish the season 3–9, and failed to qualify for the playoffs.

Quarterback Frankie Albert completed 50.7% of his passes, while throwing for 14 touchdowns and 23 interceptions. Running back Joe Perry rushed for a team-high 647 yards and 5 touchdowns, while wide receiver Alyn Beals caught 22 passes for 315 yards, and 3 touchdowns.

== Offseason ==
=== NFL draft ===
1950 San Francisco 49ers draft
Round	Pick	Player	Position	College	Notes
1	11	Leo Nomellini * ^{†}	Defensive tackle	Minnesota	
2	23	Don Campora	Tackle	Pacific	
3	37	Ray Collins *	Tackle	LSU	
4	49	Morris Bailey	End	TCU	
5	63	Harry Kane	Center	Pacific	
6	75	Don Van Pool	End	Oklahoma A&M	
7	89	Lindy Berry	Back	TCU	
8	101	Ellery Williams	End	Santa Clara	
9	115	Pete Zinach	Back	West Virginia	
10	127	Bob Celeri	Quarterback	California	
11	141	Harley Dow	Guard	San Jose State	
12	153	Don Burke	Linebacker	USC	
13	167	Lou Cecconi	Back	Pittsburgh	
14	179	Tom Payne	End	Santa Clara	
15	193	Leo Crampsey	End	St. Bonaventure	
16	205	Charley Shaw	Guard	Oklahoma A&M	
17	219	Cliff Van Meter	Back	Tulane	
18	231	Ralph Genito	Back	Kentucky	
19	245	Forest Klein	Guard	California	
20	257	Jack Nix	Quarterback	USC	
21	271	Guerin Alker	Center	Loyola (CA)	
22	283	Billy Wilson *	End	San Jose State	
23	297	Jimmy "Froggy" Williams	End	Rice	
24	309	Bill Wyman	Tackle	Rice	
25	323	Bob Dunn	Guard	Dayton	
26	335	Jim Powers	Quarterback	USC	
27	349	Ken Johnson	Guard	Pacific	
28	361	Charley Hall	Back	Arizona	
29	375	Bob Whelan	Back	Boston College	
30	387	Bob Stillwell	End	USC	
Made roster † Pro Football Hall of Fame * Made at least one Pro Bowl during career

== Preseason ==
Week	Date	Opponent	Result	Record	Venue	Attendance
1	August 20	Washington Redskins	L 12–31	0–1	Kezar Stadium	51,201
2	August 27	vs. Philadelphia Eagles	L 10–28	0–2	DU Stadium	17,000
3	August 30	at Baltimore Colts	W 27–14	1–2	Memorial Stadium	7,500
4	September 1	at Chicago Cardinals	L 21–28	1–3	Comiskey Park	29,207
5	September 10	at Pittsburgh Steelers	L 10–13	1–4	Forbes Field	19,733

== Regular season ==
=== Schedule ===
Week	Date	Opponent	Result	Record	Venue	Attendance	Sources
1	September 17	**New York Yanks**	**L** 17–21	0–1	Kezar Stadium	29,600	
2	September 24	**Chicago Bears**	**L** 20–32	0–2	Kezar Stadium	35,558	
3	October 1	**Los Angeles Rams**	**L** 14–35	0–3	Kezar Stadium	27,262	
4	October 8	at **Detroit Lions**	**L** 7–24	0–4	Tiger Stadium	17,337	
5	October 12	at **New York Yanks**	**L** 24–29	0–5	Yankee Stadium	5,740	
6	October 22	**Detroit Lions**	**W** 28–27	1–5	Kezar Stadium	27,350	
7	October 29	**Baltimore Colts**	**W** 17–14	2–5	Kezar Stadium	14,800	
8	November 5	at **Los Angeles Rams**	**L** 21–28	2–6	Los Angeles Memorial Coliseum	15,952	
9	November 12	at Cleveland Browns	**L** 14–34	2–7	Cleveland Municipal Stadium	28,786	
10	November 19	at **Chicago Bears**	**L** 0–17	2–8	Wrigley Field	35,105	
11	November 26	at **Green Bay Packers**	**L** 21–25	2–9	City Stadium	13,186	
12	Bye						
13	December 10	**Green Bay Packers**	**W** 30–14	3–9	Kezar Stadium	19,204	
Note: Intra-conference opponents are in **bold** text.

=== Game summaries ===
==== Week 1: vs. New York Yanks ====
Week One: New York Yanks at San Francisco 49ers – Game summary

Quarter	1	2	3	4	Total
**Yanks**	14	0	7	0	**21**
49ers	0	10	0	7	**17**

at Kezar Stadium, San Francisco, California

- Date: Sunday, September 17
- Game attendance: 29,600
- Pro-Football-Reference.com

Game information

First quarter

- NYY – Zollie Toth 2 yard run, Chet Adams kick (NYY 7–0)
- NYY – Joe Golding 32 yard fumble return, Chet Adams kick (NYY 14–0)

Second quarter

- SF – Paul Salata 2 yard pass from Frankie Albert (Gordie Soltau kick)

Top passers

- NYY –
- SF –

Top rushers

- NYY – Zollie Toth, 18 Car, 108 Yds, 1 TD
- SF –

Top receivers

- NYY –
- SF –

Top tacklers

- NYY –
- SF –

==== Week 2: vs. Chicago Bears ====
Week Two: Chicago Bears at San Francisco 49ers – Game summary

Quarter	1	2	3	4	Total
**Bears**	3	9	17	3	**32**
49ers	7	7	0	6	**20**

at Kezar Stadium, San Francisco, California

- Date: Sunday, September 24
- Game attendance: 35,558
- Pro-Football-Reference.com

Game information

First quarter

- SF – Bruno Banducci 11 yard pass from Frankie Albert, Gordie Soltau kick (SF 7–0)
- CHB – George Blanda 34 yard field goal (SF 7–3)

Second quarter

- SF – Norm Standlee 1 yard run, Gordie Soltau kick (SF 14–3)
- CHB – Safety, Wash Serini tackled Frankie Albert in end zone (SF 14–5)
- CHB – Ken Kavanaugh unknown fumble return, Johnny Lujack kick (SF 14–12)

Third quarter

- CHB – Julie Rykovich 15 yard run, Johnny Lujack kick (CHB 19–14)
- CHB – George Blanda 28 yard field goal (CHB 22–14)
- CHB – Gerry Weatherly 23 yard interception return, Johnny Lujack kick (CHB 29–14)

Fourth quarter

- CHB – George Blanda 40 yard field goal (CHB 32–14)
- SF – Frankie Albert 1 yard run, kick failed (CHB 32–20)

Top passers

- CHB –
- SF –

Top rushers

- CHB –
- SF –

Top receivers

- CHB –
- SF –

Top tacklers

- CHB –
- SF –

==== Week 3: vs. Los Angeles Rams ====
Week Three: Los Angeles Rams at San Francisco 49ers – Game summary

Quarter	1	2	3	4	Total
**Rams**	14	0	14	7	**35**
49ers	0	7	7	0	**14**

at Kezar Stadium, San Francisco, California

- Date: Sunday, October 1
- Game attendance: 27,262
- Pro-Football-Reference.com

Game information

First quarter

- LA – Dick Hoerner 1 yard run, Bob Waterfield kick (LA 7–0)
- LA – Glenn Davis 5 yard run, Bob Waterfield kick (LA 14–0)

Second quarter

- SF – Paul Salata 2 yard pass from Frankie Albert, Gordie Soltau kick (LA 14–7)

Third quarter

- SF – Jim Cason 13 yard pass from Frankie Albert, Gordie Soltau kick (TIE 14–14)
- LA – Vitamin Smith 97 yard kickoff return, Bob Waterfield kick (LA 21–14)
- LA – Dan Towler 34 yard run, Bob Waterfield kick (LA 28–14)

Fourth quarter

- LA – Tank Younger 1 yard run, Bob Waterfield kick (LA 35–14)

Top passers

- LA –
- SF –

Top rushers

- LA –
- SF –

Top receivers

- LA –
- SF – Alyn Beals 7 Rec, 106 Yds

Top tacklers

- LA –
- SF –

==== Week 4: at Detroit Lions ====
Week Four: San Francisco 49ers at Detroit Lions – Game summary

Quarter	1	2	3	4	Total
49ers	0	0	7	0	**7**
**Lions**	3	7	7	7	**24**

at Briggs Stadium, Detroit, Michigan

- Date: Sunday, October 8
- Game attendance: 17,337
- Pro-Football-Reference.com

Game information

First quarter

- DET – Doak Walker 23 yard field goal (DET 3–0)

Second quarter

- DET – Bobby Layne 1 yard rush, Doak Walker kick (DET 10–0)
- SF – Joe Perry 1 yard rush, Gordie Soltau kick (DET 10–7)

Third quarter

- DET – Cloyce Box 23 yard pass from Bobby Layne, Doak Walker kick (DET 17–7)

Fourth quarter

- DET – Doak Walker 28 yard pass from Bobby Layne, Doak Walker kick (DET 24–7)

Top passers

- SF –
- DET –

Top rushers

- SF –
- DET –

Top receivers

- SF – Jim Cason 8 Rec, 124 Yds, 1 TD
- DET –

Top tacklers

- SF –
- DET –

==== Week 5: at New York Yanks ====
Week Five: San Francisco 49ers at New York Yanks – Game summary

Quarter	1	2	3	4	Total
49ers	10	0	7	7	**24**
**Yanks**	0	15	0	14	**29**

at Yankee Stadium, Bronx, New York

- Date: Thursday, October 12
- Game attendance: 5,740
- Pro-Football-Reference.com

Game information

First quarter

- SF – Gordie Soltau 26 yard field goal (SF 3–0)
- SF – Johnny Strzykalski 28 yard pass from Frankie Albert, Gordie Soltau kick (SF 10–0)

Second quarter

- NYY – Sherman Howard 24 yard pass from George Ratterman, kick failed (SF 10–6)
- NYY – Art Weiner 34 yard pass from George Ratterman, Chet Adams kick (NYY 13–10)
- NYY – Safety, Martin Ruby tackled Frankie Albert in end zone (NYY 15–10)

Third quarter

- SF – Joe Perry 5 yard run, Gordie Soltau kick (SF 17–15)
- LA – Dick Hoerner 1 yard run, Bob Waterfield kick (TIE 14–14)
- LA – Paul Barry 1 yard run, Bob Waterfield kick (LA 21–14)
- LA – Tom Keane 25 yard interception return, Bob Waterfield kick (LA 28–14)

Fourth quarter

- SF – Jim Cason 27 yard pass from Frankie Albert, Gordie Soltau kick (SF 24–15)
- NYY – George Taliaferro 12 yard pass from George Ratterman, Chet Adams kick (SF 24–22)
- NYY – Buddy Young 14 yard rush, Chet Adams kick (NYY 29–24)

Top passers

- SF –
- NYY –

Top rushers

- SF –
- NYY –

Top receivers

- SF – Jim Cason 8 Rec, 124 Yds, 1 TD
- NYY –

Top tacklers

- SF –
- NYY –

==== Week 6: vs. Detroit Lions ====
Week Six: Detroit Lions at San Francisco 49ers – Game summary

Quarter	1	2	3	4	Total
Lions	0	7	14	6	**27**
**49ers**	14	7	7	0	**28**

at Kezar Stadium, San Francisco, California

- Date: Sunday, October 22
- Game attendance: 27,350
- Pro-Football-Reference.com

Game information

First quarter

- SF – Joe Perry 2 yard run, Gordie Soltau kick (SF 7–0)
- SF – Alyn Beals 9 yard pass from Frankie Albert, Gordie Soltau kick (SF 14–0)

Second quarter

- SF – Gordie Soltau 4 yard pass from Frankie Albert, Gordie Soltau kick (SF 21–0)
- DET – Cloyce Box 58 yard pass from Bobby Layne, Doak Walker kick (SF 21–7)

Third quarter

- SF – Jim Cason 9 yard pass from Frankie Albert, Gordie Soltau kick (SF 28–7)
- DET – Doak Walker 58 yard pass from Bobby Layne, Doak Walker kick (SF 28–14)
- DET – Jim Cain 2 yard fumble return, Bobby Layne kick (SF 28–21)

Fourth quarter

- DET – Dick Rifenburg 19 yard pass from Robert Hoernschemeyer, kick failed (SF 28–27)

Top passers

- DET –
- SF –

Top rushers

- DET –
- SF –

Top receivers

- DET –
- SF –

Top tacklers

- DET –
- SF –

==== Week 7: vs. Baltimore Colts ====
Week Seven: Baltimore Colts at San Francisco 49ers – Game summary

Quarter	1	2	3	4	Total
Colts	0	7	0	7	**14**
**49ers**	0	7	0	10	**17**

at Kezar Stadium, San Francisco, California

- Date: Sunday, October 29
- Game attendance: 14,800
- Pro-Football-Reference.com

Game information

First quarter

No scoring

Second quarter

- SF – Emil Sitko 4 yard run, Gordie Soltau kick (SF 7–0)
- BAL – Hal Crisler 31 yard pass from Y. A. Tittle, Rex Grossman kick (TIE 7–7)

Third quarter

No scoring

Fourth quarter

- SF – Frankie Albert 1 yard run, Gordie Soltau kick (SF 14–7)
- SF – Gordie Soltau 13 yard field goal (SF 17–7)
- BAL – Chet Mutryn 1 yard run, Rex Grossman kick (SF 17–14)

Top passers

- BAL –
- SF –

Top rushers

- BAL –
- SF – Joe Perry, 16 Car, 142 Yds

Top receivers

- BAL – Hal Crisler 3 Rec, 117 Yds, 1 TD
- SF –

Top tacklers

- BAL –
- SF –

==== Week 8: at Los Angeles Rams ====
Week Eight: San Francisco 49ers at Los Angeles Rams – Game summary

Quarter	1	2	3	4	Total
49ers	0	7	7	7	**21**
**Rams**	0	7	21	0	**28**

at Los Angeles Memorial Coliseum, Los Angeles, California

- Date: Sunday, November 5
- Game attendance: 15,952
- Pro-Football-Reference.com

Game information

First quarter

No scoring

Second quarter

- SF – Jim Cason 24 yard run, Gordie Soltau kick (SF 7–0)
- LA – Bob Boyd 72 yard pass from Bob Waterfield, Bob Waterfield kick (TIE 7–7)

Third quarter

- SF – Howie Livingston 35 yard interception return, Gordie Soltau kick (SF 14–7)
- LA – Dick Hoerner 1 yard run, Bob Waterfield kick (TIE 14–14)
- LA – Paul Barry 1 yard run, Bob Waterfield kick (LA 21–14)
- LA – Tom Keane 25 yard interception return, Bob Waterfield kick (LA 28–14)

Fourth quarter

- SF – Alyn Beals 36 yard pass from Frankie Albert, Gordie Soltau kick (LA 28–21)

Top passers

- SF –
- LA –

Top rushers

- SF –
- LA –

Top receivers

- SF –
- LA –

Top tacklers

- SF –
- LA –

==== Week 9: at Cleveland Browns ====
Week Nine: San Francisco 49ers at Cleveland Browns – Game summary

Quarter	1	2	3	4	Total
49ers	7	7	0	0	**14**
**Browns**	7	7	3	17	**34**

at Cleveland Stadium, Cleveland, Ohio

- Date: Sunday, November 12
- Game attendance: 28,786
- Pro-Football-Reference.com

Game information

First quarter

- SF – Frankie Albert 1 yard run, Gordie Soltau kick (SF 7–0)
- CLE – Dub Jones 7 yard pass from Otto Graham, Lou Groza kick (TIE 7–7)

Second quarter

- CLE – Marion Motley 22 yard run, Lou Groza kick (CLE 14–7)
- SF – Alyn Beals 28 yard pass from Frankie Albert, Gordie Soltau kick (TIE 14–14)

Third quarter

- CLE – Lou Groza 22 yard field goal (CLE 17–14)

Fourth quarter

- CLE – Lou Groza 10 yard field goal (CLE 20–14)
- CLE – Dub Jones 3 yard run, Lou Groza kick (CLE 27–14)
- CLE – Rex Bumgardner 12 yard run, Lou Groza kick (CLE 34–14)

Top passers

- SF –
- CLE –

Top rushers

- SF –
- CLE – Marion Motley 21 Car, 114 Yds, 1 TD

Top receivers

- SF – Alex Loyd 5 Rec, 102 Yds
- CLE –

Top tacklers

- SF –
- CLE –

==== Week 10: at Chicago Bears ====
Week Ten: San Francisco 49ers at Chicago Bears – Game summary

Quarter	1	2	3	4	Total
49ers	0	0	0	0	**0**
**Bears**	10	7	0	0	**17**

at Wrigley Field, Chicago, Illinois

- Date: Sunday, November 19
- Game attendance: 35,105
- Pro-Football-Reference.com

Game information

First quarter

- CHI – George Blanda 32 yard field goal (CHI 3–0)
- CHI – John Hoffman 39 yard interception return, Johnny Lujack kick (CHI 10–0)

Second quarter

- CHI – Ken Kavanaugh 39 yard pass from Johnny Lujack, Johnny Lujack kick (CHI 17–0)

Third quarter

no scoring

Fourth quarter

no scoring

Top passers

- SF –
- CHI –

Top rushers

- SF –
- CHI –

Top receivers

- SF –
- CHI –

Top tacklers

- SF –
- CHI –

==== Week 11: at Green Bay Packers ====
Week Eleven: San Francisco 49ers at Green Bay Packers – Game summary

Quarter	1	2	3	4	Total
49ers	7	0	14	0	**21**
**Packers**	7	6	0	12	**25**

at City Stadium, Green Bay, Wisconsin

- Date: Sunday, November 26
- Game attendance: 13,196
- Pro-Football-Reference.com

Game information

First quarter

- SF – Johnny Strzykalski 1 yard run, Gordie Soltau kick (SF 7–0)
- GB – Billy Grimes 57 yard run, Ted Fritsch kick (TIE 7–7)

Second quarter

- GB – Tony Canadeo 2 yard run, kick failed (GB 13–7)

Third quarter

- SF – Fred Gehrke 2 yard run, Gordie Soltau kick (SF 14–13)
- SF – Emil Sitko 10 yard pass from Frankie Albert, Gordie Soltau kick (SF 21–13)

Fourth quarter

- GB – Jack Cloud 2 yard run, kick failed (SF 21–19)
- GB – Floyd Reid 44 yard pass from Paul Christman, kick failed (GB 25–21)

Top passers

- GB –
- SF –

Top rushers

- GB –
- SF –

Top receivers

- GB –
- SF –

Top tacklers

- GB –
- SF –

==== Week 13: vs. Green Bay Packers ====
Week Thirteen: Green Bay Packers at San Francisco 49ers – Game summary

Quarter	1	2	3	4	Total
Packers	7	0	7	0	**14**
**49ers**	10	14	0	6	**30**

at Kezar Stadium, San Francisco, California

- Date: Sunday, December 10
- Game attendance: 19,204
- Pro-Football-Reference.com

Game information

First quarter

- GB – Billy Grimes 96 yard pass from Tobin Rote, Ted Fritsch kick (GB 7–0)
- SF – Johnny Strzykalski 7 yard run, Gordie Soltau kick (TIE 7–7)
- SF – Gordie Soltau 21 yard field goal (SF 10–7)

Second quarter

- SF – Joe Perry 10 yard pass from Frankie Albert, Gordie Soltau kick (SF 17–7)
- SF – Joe Perry 78 yard run, Jack Nix pass from Frankie Albert (SF 24–7)

Third quarter

- GB – Steve Pritko 3 yard pass from Tobin Rote, Clayton Tonnemaker kick (SF 24–14)

Fourth quarter

- SF – Fred Gehrke 4 yard pass from Frankie Albert, kick failed (SF 30–14)

Top passers

- GB –
- SF –

Top rushers

- GB –
- SF – Joe Perry, 9 Car, 135 Yds, 1 TD

Top receivers

- GB –
- SF –

Top tacklers

- GB –
- SF –

== Standings ==
NFL National Conference
	W	L	T	PCT	CONF	PF	PA	STK
Los Angeles Rams	9	3	0	.750	9–2	466	309	W1
Chicago Bears	9	3	0	.750	8–2	279	207	W1
New York Yanks	7	5	0	.583	7–4	366	367	W1
Detroit Lions	6	6	0	.500	5–6	321	285	L1
San Francisco 49ers	3	9	0	.250	3–8	213	300	W1
Green Bay Packers	3	9	0	.250	2–9	244	406	L2
Baltimore Colts	1	11	0	.083	1–4	213	462	L5

Note: Tie games were not officially counted in the standings until 1972.

== Roster ==
1950 San Francisco 49ers final roster
Quarterbacks: 63 Frankie Albert P; Running backs: 93 Jim Cason RB/CB; 81 Fred Gehrke; 74 Joe Perry; 82 Emil Sitko; 91 Johnny Strzykalski; Receivers: 53 Alyn Beals DE; 59 Alex Loyd; 58 Jack Nix; 51 Gordy Soltau K	Linemen: 33 Bruno Banducci G/MG; 54 Gail Bruce DE/WR; 41 Don Campora T/DT; 43 Ray Collins DT; 40 Harley Dow T/G; 46 Ray Evans G; 34 Visco Grgich MG/G; 37 Homer Hobbs G; 23 Bill Johnson C; 46 Clay Matthews T; 42 Leo Nomellini DT; 45 Chuck Quilter T; 52 Hal Shoener DE/WR	Linebackers: 73 Don Burke; 71 Verl Lillywhite FB/P; 72 Norm Standlee FB; 22 Pete Wismann C; Defensive backs: 83 Sam Cathcart RB/S; 88 Don Garlin CB; 94 Howie Livingston CB; 62 Jim Powers CB/QB; 92 Lowell Wagner CB	Reserve list: -- Jim Winkler DT (Military); rookies in italics

== Pro Bowl ==
San Francisco's players selected for the Pro Bowl:

Player	Position
Frankie Albert	Quarterback
Visco Grgich	Offensive line
Leo Nomellini	Defensive line
Norm Standlee	Running back
Johnny Strzykalski	Running back
