= 1948 San Francisco 49ers season =

American football team season

- Owner: Tony Morabito
- General manager: John Blackinger
- Head coach: Buck Shaw
- Home stadium: Kezar Stadium

Results
- Record: 12–2
- Division place: 2nd AAFC West
- Playoffs: Did not qualify

The 1948 San Francisco 49ers season was the franchise's third season in the All-America Football Conference (AAFC). The 49ers, hoped to improve upon their 8–4–2 output from the previous season. They began the season 10–0, and finished 12–2, both losses coming to eventual season champions, the Cleveland Browns.

Program for the Forty-Niners' October 10 game at Baltimore.

The 49ers' offense was historically prolific: they scored 495 points in 1948 (averaging over 35 points per game), which was more than 100 points more than the next best output (389 points by the Browns). Despite their 12–2 record, the 49ers did not qualify for the playoffs, due to the Browns 14–0 record.

The 1948 49ers had a record-setting rushing attack: the team rushed for a staggering 3,663 yards in only fourteen games, a professional football record that still stands.

Head coach Lawrence "Buck" Shaw.

The team's statistical leaders included Frankie Albert with 1,990 passing yards, Johnny Strzykalski with 915 rushing yards, and Alyn Beals with 591 receiving yards and 84 points scored.

As of 2025, the 49ers +247 point differential remains the most by any team missing the playoffs

== Preseason ==
Week	Date	Opponent	Result	Record	Venue	Attendance
1	August 18	at Los Angeles Dons	W 42–24	1–0	Rose Bowl	58,207
2	August 22	Baltimore Colts	W 42–14	2–0	Kezar Stadium	35,139

== Schedule ==
Week	Date	Opponent	Result	Record	Venue	Attendance	Source
1	August 29	Buffalo Bills	**W** 35–14	1–0	Kezar Stadium	33,946	
2	September 5	Brooklyn Dodgers	**W** 36–20	2–0	Kezar Stadium	32,606	
3	September 12	New York Yankees	**W** 41–0	3–0	Kezar Stadium	60,927	
4	September 19	**Los Angeles Dons**	**W** 36–14	4–0	Kezar Stadium	45,420	
5	September 26	at Buffalo Bills	**W** 38–28	5–0	Civic Stadium	31,103	
6	October 1	at **Chicago Rockets**	**W** 31–14	6–0	Soldier Field	14,553	
7	October 10	at Baltimore Colts	**W** 56–14	7–0	Memorial Stadium	22,359	
8	October 17	at New York Yankees	**W** 21–7	8–0	Yankee Stadium	29,743	
9	October 24	Baltimore Colts	**W** 21–10	9–0	Kezar Stadium	27,978	
10	Bye						
11	November 7	**Chicago Rockets**	**W** 44–21	10–0	Kezar Stadium	25,308	
12	November 14	at **Cleveland Browns**	**L** 7–14	10–1	Cleveland Municipal Stadium	82,769	
13	November 21	at Brooklyn Dodgers	**W** 63–40	11–1	Ebbets Field	9,336	
14	November 28	**Cleveland Browns**	**L** 28–31	11–2	Kezar Stadium	59,785	
15	December 5	at **Los Angeles Dons**	**W** 38–21	12–2	Los Angeles Memorial Coliseum	51,460	
Note: Intra-division opponents are in **bold** text.

== Standings ==
AAFC Western Division
	W	L	T	PCT	DIV	PF	PA	STK
Cleveland Browns	14	0	0	1.000	6–0	389	190	W14
San Francisco 49ers	12	2	0	.857	4–2	495	248	W1
Los Angeles Dons	7	7	0	.500	2–4	258	305	L2
Chicago Rockets	1	13	0	.071	0–6	202	439	L11

Note: Tie games were not officially counted in the standings.

== Roster ==
1948 San Francisco 49ers final roster
Quarterbacks: 63 Frankie Albert P/S; 64 Bev Wallace; Receivers: 53 Alyn Beals; 54 Gail Bruce; 56 Clarence Howell; 59 Ned Maloney; 52 Hal Shoener; 58 Nick Susoeff	Linemen/Linebackers: 33 Bruno Banducci G/MG; 42 Bob Bryant T/DT; 31 Don Clark G/MG; 48 Floyd Collier T/DT; 32 Jim Cox G/MG; 21 Dutch Elston C/LB; 34 Visco Grgich G/MG; 23 Bill Johnson C/LB; 37 Riley Matheson MLB; 38 Walt McCormick G/MG; 47 Bob Mike T/DT; 46 Hal Puddy T/DT; 22 Joel Williams C/LB; 41 John Woudenberg T/DT	Backs: 85 Eddie Carr CB/RB; 93 Jim Cason S/RB; 92 Paul Crowe CB/RB; 81 Len Eshmont CB/RB; 88 Forrest Hall RB; 71 Verl Lillywhite FB/LB; 74 Joe Perry FB/LB; 72 Norm Standlee FB/LB; 91 Johnny Strzykalski RB/CB; 92 Bob Sullivan RB/CB; 82 Joe Vetrano RB/CB/K; rookies in italics
