= Floyd Collier =

American football player (1924–2002)

- Floyd Collier, 1946

No. 48
- Position: Tackle

Personal information
- Born: May 10, 1924; Fresno, California
- Died: September 3, 2002 (aged 78); Laguna Hills, California
- Listed height: 6 ft 1 in (1.85 m)
- Listed weight: 215 lb (98 kg)

Career information
- High school: Exeter (CA)
- College: San Jose State, USC

Career history
- San Francisco 49ers (1948)

Career statistics
- Games: 12
- Stats at Pro Football Reference

Floyd Lee Collier (May 10, 1924 – September 3, 2002) was an American football player who played at the tackle position. He played college football for San Jose State and USC, military football for the 1944 Saint Mary's Pre-Flight Air Devils football team, and professional football for the 1948 San Francisco 49ers.

== Early life ==
Collier was born in 1924 in Fresno, California. He attended and played football at Exeter Union High School in Exeter, California.

== Military and college football ==
After graduating from high school, Collier enrolled at San Jose State College in 1942. He was a member of the 1942 San Jose State Spartans football team and also competed in the discus and javelin throw for the San Jose State track team.

His college career was interrupted by service in the United States Navy during World War II. While serving in the Navy, he played as a first string tackle for the 1944 Saint Mary's Pre-Flight Air Devils football team that was ranked No. 19 in the final AP Poll.

After the war, Collier enrolled at the University of Southern California and played on the 1946 USC Trojans football team.

== Professional football ==
Collier played professional football in the All-America Football Conference for the 1948 San Francisco 49ers team that compiled a 12–2 record and averaged over 35 points per game. During the 49ers preseason training camp, Collier entertained the team by hypnotizing teammates Verl Lillywhite and Paul Crowe into taking off their shoes and scratching their left feet. He appeared in 12 of the 49ers' 14 games.

== Family and later years ==
Collier died in 2002 at age 78 in Laguna Hills, California.
