= Alex Loyd =

American football player (1927–1976)

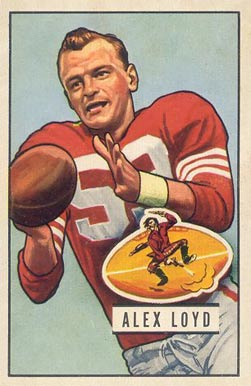
- Loyd on a 1951 Bowman football card

No. 59
- Position: End

Personal information
- Born: August 7, 1927; Stigler, Oklahoma, U.S.
- Died: May 25, 1976 (aged 48); Dallas, Texas, U.S.
- Listed height: 6 ft 3 in (1.91 m)
- Listed weight: 198 lb (90 kg)

Career information
- College: Oklahoma State
- NFL draft: 1950: 15th round, 188th overall pick

Career history
- San Francisco 49ers (1950)

Career NFL statistics
- Receptions: 32
- Receiving yards: 402
- Stats at Pro Football Reference

Edgar Alex Loyd (August 7, 1927 – May 1976) was an American professional football end in the National Football League (NFL) for the San Francisco 49ers. He played college football at Oklahoma State University, where he won a championship and held the record for most passes received in a game in the program's history. He was then drafted in the fifteenth round of the 1950 NFL draft by the Washington Redskins.

== Early life ==
Loyd was born and raised in Stigler, Oklahoma. Loyd's father was Stigler's postmaster general, and had five sons and two daughters. In his high school years, he worked nights in a graveyard, guarding the graves from robbers.

== College career ==
After considering playing college basketball, Loyd played football for Oklahoma A&M (which was later renamed Oklahoma State University in 1957) from 1945 to 1949. He played tight end on the 1945 national championship team, alongside halfback Bob Fenimore, who would later go on to be inducted in the Dallas Cowboys' Ring of Honor. In 1949, he caught 16 passes in a game, which as of 2024, is still the most in the program's history.

== Professional career ==
Loyd was selected in the 15th round of the 1950 NFL Draft by the Washington Redskins, but was then traded to the San Francisco 49ers before the start of that season. He was teammates with Jim Cason and Frankie Albert. In his rookie season, he caught 32 passes for 402 yards, good for 22nd in the NFL. However, his career was cut short by a shoulder injury.

== Personal life ==
Loyd married Jimmie Parkinson, and they had three kids. When his football career ended, he moved to Dallas to join one of his brother's sporting goods company as a sales rep.

== Death ==
Loyd died in 1976 at the age of 48 due to cancer. His teammates from the 1945 Oklahoma championship team, including Fenimore, served as pallbearers at his funeral. He is survived by his daughter Kathy Petrey.
