= Norm Standlee =

American football player (1919–1981)

- Standlee in 1949

No. 22, 72, 32
- Positions: Fullback, linebacker

Personal information
- Born: July 19, 1919; Downey, California, U.S.
- Died: January 4, 1981 (aged 61); Mountain View, California, U.S.
- Listed height: 6 ft 2 in (1.88 m)
- Listed weight: 238 lb (108 kg)

Career information
- High school: Woodrow Wilson (Long Beach, California)
- College: Stanford (1937–1940)
- NFL draft: 1941: 1st round, 3rd overall pick

Career history
- Chicago Bears (1941); San Francisco 49ers (1946–1952)

Awards and highlights
- NFL champion (1941); Second-team All-Pro (1941); 2× Pro Bowl (1941, 1950); Second-team All-American (1940); First-team All-PCC (1940); Second-team All-PCC (1939)

Career NFL/AAFC statistics
- Rushing yards: 2,244
- Rushing average: 4.6
- Receptions: 7
- Receiving yards: 15
- Total touchdowns: 23
- Stats at Pro Football Reference

Norman S. Standlee (July 19, 1919 – January 5, 1981) was an American professional football player who was a fullback and, later in his career, linebacker for the San Francisco 49ers of the National Football League (NFL). He played college football for the Stanford Indians (now Cardinal) and was selected by the Chicago Bears in the first round of the 1941 NFL draft with the third overall pick. He paid immediate dividends by finishing fourth in the league in rushing with a total of 414 yards and second in average per carry with 5.1. He helped the Chicago Bears to the league championship title over the New York Giants that year before serving in the armed forces in World War II.

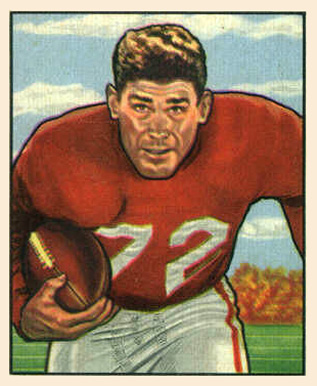
Norm Standlee on a 1950 Bowman football card.

Standlee was also the first fullback for the San Francisco 49ers of the All-America Football Conference, playing with Frankie Albert, Johnny Strzykalski, and Len Eshmont in that first backfield of the 49ers.

On January 5, 1981, he died of natural causes in a motel room. He was 61.

== NFL/AAFC career statistics ==
Legend
	Won the NFL Championship
	Led the league
**Bold**	Career high

=== Regular season ===
Year	Team	Games		Rushing					Receiving				
Year	Team	GP	GS	Att	Yds	Avg	Lng	TD	Rec	Yds	Avg	Lng	TD
1941	CHI	10	3	81	414	5.1	46	5	**2**	−3	−1.5	**3**	0
1946	SFO	13	10	134	**651**	4.9	–	**2**	2	−5	−2.5	–	0
1947	SFO	14	12	**145**	585	4.0	–	**8**	**2**	**22**	**11.0**	–	0
1948	SFO	14	13	52	261	5.0	**57**	3	1	1	1.0	1	0
1949	SFO	12	8	44	237	**5.4**	–	4	0	0	0.0	0	0
1950	SFO	11	11	12	23	1.9	8	1	0	0	0.0	0	0
1951	SFO	11	11	16	65	4.1	13	0	0	0	0.0	0	0
1952	SFO	1	0	2	8	4.0	9	0	0	0	0.0	0	0
		86	68	486	2,244	4.6	57	23	7	15	2.1	3	0

=== Playoffs ===
Year	Team	Games		Rushing					Receiving				
Year	Team	GP	GS	Att	Yds	Avg	Lng	TD	Rec	Yds	Avg	Lng	TD
1941	CHI	2	2	**32**	**168**	**5.3**	–	**4**	**2**	**34**	**17.0**	**21**	0
1949	SFO	2	2	14	50	3.6	0	0	0	0	0.0	0	0
		4	4	46	218	4.7	–	4	2	34	17.0	21	0
