= Charlie Shaw (American football) =

American football player (1927–1994)

- Charlie Shaw, 1948

No. 31
- Position: Guard

Personal information
- Born: March 6, 1927; Durant, Oklahoma, U.S.
- Died: June 17, 1994 (aged 67); Kingston, Oklahoma, U.S.
- Listed height: 6 ft 1 in (1.85 m)
- Listed weight: 220 lb (100 kg)

Career information
- High school: Classen (Oklahoma City, Oklahoma)
- College: Oklahoma A&M
- NFL draft: 1950: 16th round, 205th overall pick

Career history
- San Francisco 49ers (1950)

Career NFL statistics
- Games played: 6
- Games started: 3
- Stats at Pro Football Reference

Charles Edward Shaw (March 6, 1927 – June 17, 1994) was an American professional football player. He played at the guard, tackle, and center positions. He played college football for Oklahoma A&M

== Early life ==
A native of Durant, Oklahoma, Shaw attended Classen High School in Oklahoma City.

== College and military service ==
Shaw played college football for the Oklahoma A&M Cowboys from 1946 to 1949. While playing for the Cowboys, he was six feet, two inches, and weighed 215 pounds. He also served in the United States Navy.

== Professional career ==
He then played professional football in the National Football League (NFL) for the San Francisco 49ers during their 1950 season. He appeared in six NFL games, three of them as a starter. He was released by the 49ers on October 21, 1950.

== Family and later life ==
While in college, Shaw married fellow Oklahoma A&M student, Joey Estes. They had a daughter in November 1948. He died in 1994 at age 67.
