= Hal Shoener =

American football player (1923–1983)

Profile
- Positions: End, defensive end

Personal information
- Born: January 2, 1923; Reedsville, West Virginia
- Died: December 13, 1983 (aged 60); Oakland, California
- Listed height: 6 ft 3 in (1.91 m)
- Listed weight: 200 lb (91 kg)

Career information
- High school: Charleston (WV)
- College: Iowa
- NFL draft: 1947: 23rd round, 214th overall pick

Career history
- San Francisco 49ers (1948-1950)

Career NFL statistics
- Games: 38
- Stats at Pro Football Reference

Harold Phillip Shoener (January 2, 1923 – December 13, 1983) was an American professional football end and defensive end.

Shoener was born in 1923 in Reedsville, West Virginia. He had a twin brother, Herb Shoener, who played in the NFL as well. Their father was a graduated of the Naval Academy and an executive for Texaco. The Shoener brothers grew up in Pottsville, Pennsylvania, and Charleston, West Virginia, and attended Charleston High School.

The brothers enrolled at Lehigh University but spent only a year there before being inducted into the military during World War II. Hal Shoener served at Johns Hopkins University and then in Europe. After the war, the Shoener brothers enrolled at the University of Iowa, starting at opposite end positions for the Iowa Hawkeyes football team in 1946 and 1947.

Hal Shoener then played professional football in the National Football League (NFL) for the San Francisco 49ers from the 1948 to 1950 seasons. He appeared in 38 NFL games and caught 22 passes for 160 yards and three touchdowns. He sustained a knee injury during the preseason in August 1951. The injury required surgery and ended his playing career.

After his playing career ended, Shoener developed a drinking problem. He was convicted of drunk driving after crashing his car into an Oakland police car. He developed a business as a pallet broker and lived in Piedmont, California. He died in 1983 at age 69 at Kaiser Hospital in Oakland, California. The cause of death was cirrhosis of the liver.
