= Johnny Strzykalski =

American football player (1921–2002)

- Strzykalski in 1949

No. 91, 45
- Position: Halfback

Personal information
- Born: December 14, 1921; Milwaukee, Wisconsin, U.S.
- Died: June 19, 2002 (aged 80); Hendersonville, North Carolina, U.S.
- Listed height: 5 ft 9 in (1.75 m)
- Listed weight: 190 lb (86 kg)

Career information
- High school: South Division (Milwaukee)
- College: Marquette (1942)
- NFL draft: 1946: 1st round, 6th overall pick

Career history
- San Francisco 49ers (1946–1952)

Awards and highlights
- 2× Second-team All-Pro (1948, 1950); Pro Bowl (1950)

Career NFL/AAFC statistics
- Rushing yards: 3,415
- Rushing average: 5.2
- Receptions: 93
- Receiving yards: 1,218
- Total touchdowns: 31
- Stats at Pro Football Reference

John Raymond "Strike" Strzykalski (December 14, 1921 – June 19, 2002) was an American professional football player who was a halfback for the San Francisco 49ers of the National Football League (NFL). He played college football for the Marquette Golden Avalanche and was selected by the Green Bay Packers in the 1946 NFL draft. Strzykalski served in the United States Air Force prior to his football career.

Nicknamed "Strike" by his teammates, Strzykalski retired at the end of the 1952 NFL season together with quarterback Frankie Albert, leaving Bruno Banducci the last original 49er on the roster.

== NFL/AAFC career statistics ==
Legend
	Led the league
**Bold**	Career high

Year	Team	Games		Rushing					Receiving				
Year	Team	GP	GS	Att	Yds	Avg	Lng	TD	Rec	Yds	Avg	Lng	TD
1946	SFO	13	11	79	346	4.4	**50**	2	9	80	8.9	-	0
1947	SFO	14	13	**143**	906	6.3	**50**	**5**	15	258	17.2	-	3
1948	SFO	14	13	141	**915**	**6.5**	48	4	**26**	**485**	**18.7**	**59**	**7**
1949	SFO	7	4	66	287	4.3	44	3	6	99	16.5	-	1
1950	SFO	12	12	136	612	4.5	38	2	24	187	7.8	28	1
1951	SFO	11	9	81	296	3.7	13	3	12	105	8.8	13	0
1952	SFO	10	0	16	53	3.3	11	0	1	4	4.0	4	0
Career		81	62	662	3,415	5.2	50	19	93	1,218	13.1	59	12
