= Ed Balatti =

American football player (1924–1990)

No. 57, 50, 58
- Positions: Tight end, Cornerback

Personal information
- Born: April 8, 1924; Los Banos, California, U.S.
- Died: August 27, 1990 (aged 66); Novato, California, U.S.
- Listed height: 6 ft 1 in (1.85 m)
- Listed weight: 195 lb (88 kg)

Career information
- High school: Oakland Technical (CA)
- College: none

Career history
- San Francisco Packers (PCPFL) (1942); San Francisco Clippers (PCPFL) (1946); San Francisco 49ers (AAFC) (1946–1948); Buffalo Bills (AAFC) (1948); New York Yankees (AAFC) (1948); San Francisco Clippers (PCPFL) (1948)

Career statistics
- Games played: 38
- Receptions-yards: 12–113
- Extra point attempts: 3
- Extra points made: 3
- Interception touchdowns: 1
- Kick returns-yards: 1–16
- Punt returns-yards: 2–8
- Punt return touchdowns: 1
- Stats at Pro Football Reference

Edward T. Balatti, also known as Attilio Balatti (April 8, 1924 – August 27, 1990) was an American football cornerback and tight end who played three seasons for the San Francisco 49ers, also spending time with the Buffalo Bills and New York Yankees. He also played for the San Francisco Packers and the San Francisco Clippers of the Pacific Coast Professional Football League.

Balatti played 14 games in 1946, 14 in 1947 and 10 in 1948. During his career, he had 12 receptions for 113 yards and 1 touchdown. He also had an interception returned for a touchdown and a blocked punt touchdown.

== Early life ==
Balatti was born on April 8, 1924, in Los Banos, California. He went to high school at Oakland Technical (CA). He did not go to college.

== Football career ==
=== San Francisco Packers ===
In 1942, at the age of 18, he played for the San Francisco Packers of the Pacific Coast Football League. He played only in 1942 before going to the United States Coast Guard.

=== San Francisco Clippers ===
He played for the San Francisco Clippers in 1946. The Clippers replaced the San Francisco Packers in 1945. Shortly after playing for the Clippers, he went to the San Francisco 49ers of the newly formed AAFC.

=== San Francisco 49ers ===
Balatti played for the San Francisco 49ers of the AAFC from 1946 to 1949. In week 13 of the 1946 season, he had an interception return touchdown against the Chicago Rockets. In the 1946 season he played in 14 games. Balatti also had four receptions for 15 yards and two Extra Points made. During week four of the 1947 season, he had a 30-yard receiving touchdown from Frankie Albert. In week 13, he had a 4-yard blocked punt return touchdown against the Chicago Rockets. The 49ers would go on to win the game 41 to 16. During the 1947 season, he had 8 receptions for 98 yards and a touchdown. He also had one made extra point. He played only one game for the 49ers in 1948 before going to the Buffalo Bills.

=== Buffalo Bills ===
Balatti played seven games for the Buffalo Bills and started one. After the seven games he went to the New York Yankees.

=== New York Yankees ===
Ed played two games for the New York Yankees. The Yankees were his third AAFC team of the season. He had no statistics with the Yankees.

=== San Francisco Clippers (second stint) ===
Ed then played shortly for the San Francisco Clippers. That was his fourth team of the season. He did not play for any other teams after the 1948 season.

== Later life ==
He was later a used-car dealer. He was arrested in 1986 for fencing. He died on August 27, 1990, at the age of 66.
