= 1953 All-Pro Team =

Official list of the best NFL players in 1953

The 1953 All-Pro Team consisted of American football players chosen by various selectors for the All-Pro team of the National Football League (NFL) for the 1953 NFL season. Teams were selected by, among others, the Associated Press (AP) (based on voting among 48 member paper sports writers and AP staffers), the United Press (UP), and the New York Daily News.

== Selections ==
Offensive selections
Position	Player	Team	Selector(s)
Quarterback	Otto Graham	Cleveland Browns	AP, UP-1, NYDN-1
Quarterback	Bobby Layne	Detroit Lions	UP-2
Quarterback	Bobby Thomason	Philadelphia Eagles	NYDN-2
Halfback	Hugh McElhenny	San Francisco 49ers	AP, UP-1, NYDN-1
Halfback	Doak Walker	Detroit Lions	AP, UP-2, NYDN-2
Halfback	Dan Towler	Los Angeles Rams	UP-1, NYDN-2
Halfback	Robert Hoernschemeyer	Detroit Lions	UP-2, NYDN-1
Fullback	Joe Perry	San Francisco 49ers	AP, UP-1, NYDN-1
Fullback	Chick Jagade	Cleveland Browns	UP-2
Fullback	Johnny Olszewski	Chicago Cardinals	NYDN-2
End	Pete Pihos	Philadelphia Eagles	AP, UP-1, NYDN-1
End	Dante Lavelli	Cleveland Browns	UP-1, NYDN-1
End	Elroy Hirsch	Los Angeles Rams	AP, UP-2, NYDN-2
End	Gordy Soltau	San Francisco 49ers	UP-2
End	Hugh Taylor	Washington Redskins	NYDN-2
Tackle	Lou Groza	Cleveland Browns	AP, UP-1, NYDN-1
Tackle	George Connor	Chicago Bears	AP, NYDN-1
Tackle	Lum Snyder	Philadelphia Eagles	UP-2
Tackle	Bob St. Clair	San Francisco 49ers	UP-2
Tackle	Frank Wydo	Philadelphia Eagles	NYDN-2
Guard	Lou Creekmur	Detroit Lions	AP, UP-1 [tackle], NYDN-1
Guard	Dick Stanfel	Detroit Lions	AP, UP-1, NYDN-1
Guard	Bruno Banducci	San Francisco	UP-1
Guard	Abe Gibron	Cleveland Browns	UP-2, NYDN-1
Guard	Bud McFadin	Los Angeles Rams	UP-2
Guard	Bruno Banducci	San Francisco 49ers	NYDN-2
Guard	Bill Lange	Baltimore Colts	NYDN-2
Center	Frank Gatski	Cleveland Browns	AP, UP-1, NYDN-1
Center	Bill Johnson	San Francisco 49ers	UP-2
Center	Brad Ecklund	Baltimore Colts	NYDN-2

Defensive selections
Position	Player	Team	Selector(s)
Defensive end	Len Ford	Cleveland Browns	AP, UP-1, NYDN-1
Defensive end	Norm Willey	Philadelphia Eagles	UP-1, NYDN-1
Defensive end	Andy Robustelli	Los Angeles Rams	AP, UP-2, NYDN-2
Defensive end	Bill McPeak	Pittsburgh Steelers	UP-2
Defensive end	Larry Brink	Los Angeles Rams	NYDN-2
Defensive tackle	Arnie Weinmeister	New York Giants	AP, UP-1, NYDN-1
Defensive tackle	Leo Nomellini	San Francisco 49ers	AP, UP-1, NYDN-1
Defensive tackle	Thurman "Fum" McGraw	Detroit Lions	UP-2, NYDN-1
Defensive tackle	Ernie Stautner	Pittsburgh Steelers	UP-2, NYDN-2
Defensive tackle	Don Colo	Cleveland Browns	NYDN-2
Defensive guard	Les Bingaman	Detroit Lions	AP, UP-1, NYDN-1 [middle guard]
Defensive guard	Bill Willis	Cleveland Browns	AP, UP-2
Defensive guard	Dale Dodrill	Pittsburgh Steelers	UP-1
Defensive guard	Bucko Kilroy	Philadelphia Eagles	UP-2, NYDN-2
Defensive guard	Art Michalik	San Francisco 49ers	NYDN-2
Linebacker	Chuck Bednarik	Philadelphia Eagles	AP, UP-2, NYDN-1
Linebacker	Tommy Thompson	Cleveland Browns	AP [def. halfback], UP-1, NYDN-2
Linebacker	Don Paul	Los Angeles Rams	AP, UP-2, NYDN-2
Linebacker	George Connor	Chicago Bears	UP-1
Linebacker	Clayton Tonnemaker	Green Bay Packers	NYDN-2
Defensive halfback	Jack Christiansen	Detroit Lions	AP [safety], UP-1, NYDN-1
Defensive halfback	Tom Keane	Baltimore Colts	AP, UP-1, NYDN-1
Defensive halfback	Warren Lahr	Cleveland Browns	UP-2
Defensive halfback	Bert Rechichar	Baltimore Colts	UP-2, NYDN-2
Defensive halfback	Frank Gifford	New York Giants	NYDN-2
Safety	Ken Gorgal	Cleveland Browns	UP-1
Safety	Woodley Lewis	Los Angeles Rams	UP-2
Safety	Bobby Dillon	Green Bay Packers	NYDN-2
