= Bill Johnson (center) =

American football player and coach (1926–2011)

- Johnson in 1949

No. 23, 53
- Positions: Center, linebacker

Personal information
- Born: September 14, 1926; Tyler, Texas, U.S.
- Died: January 7, 2011 (aged 84); Fort Myers, Florida, U.S.
- Listed height: 6 ft 3 in (1.91 m)
- Listed weight: 228 lb (103 kg)

Career information
- High school: Tyler
- College: Texas A&M (1944, 1946); Tyler CC (1947)
- NFL draft: 1948: undrafted

Career history

Playing
- San Francisco 49ers (1948–1956)

Coaching
- Cincinnati Bengals (1968–1975) Offensive line coach; Cincinnati Bengals (1976–1978) Head coach; Tampa Bay Buccaneers (1979–1982) Offensive line coach; Detroit Lions (1983–1984) Offensive line coach; Cincinnati Bengals (1985–1990) Tight ends coach

Awards and highlights
- 3× Second-team All-Pro (1953–1955); 2× Pro Bowl (1952, 1953)

Career NFL/AAFC statistics
- Games played: 95
- Games started: 87
- Interceptions: 2
- Stats at Pro Football Reference

Head coaching record
- Regular season: 18–15–0 (.545)
- Coaching profile at Pro Football Reference

William Levi Johnson Sr. (September 14, 1926 – January 7, 2011), frequently known by the nickname "Tiger", was an American professional football player and coach. He played center for the San Francisco 49ers from 1948 to 1956.

== Biography ==
=== Early life ===
Bill Johnson was born in Tyler, Texas, where he was raised by his single mother and five older siblings. Among his siblings was older brother Gilbert Johnson, who played quarterback at Southern Methodist University with the iconic running back Doak Walker. He was a football and baseball star for Tyler Junior College and Texas A&M University and graduated from Stephen F. Austin State University.

=== Professional football player ===
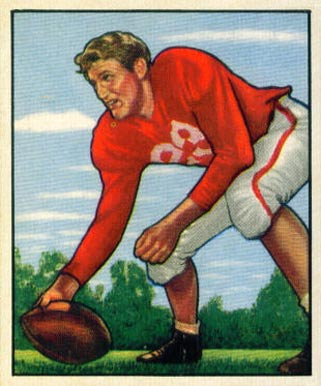
Johnson on a 1950 Bowman football card.

Although known mostly for his accomplishments as a football player in the National Football League (NFL), Johnson had a prolific career in college as well, not only in football, but also baseball. He began his college football career at Tyler Junior College, a small school in Johnson's hometown of Tyler, Texas. He finished his collegiate career with Texas A&M University.

The end of his college sports career brought about a pressing issue; was Johnson to pursue a professional career in the MLB with the Cincinnati Reds, who had offered him a minor-league contract, or test his football ability in the NFL with the San Francisco 49ers, who offered Bill with a non-drafted rookie free agent contract. Johnson decided to go with football, even though his true love was baseball. He was a phenomenal catcher at the collegiate level, but always stated that he would have never made it in "the bigs" due to a lack of ability in throwing out base runners when they would attempt to steal.

Johnson gained the nickname of "Tiger" in his first season as a 49er. He spent most of his 1948 rookie season injured, only seeing the field in five of the twelve regular season games due in large part to a broken left hand suffered in a preseason game. Sitting in a bar with teammates Norm Standlee and Nick Susoeff, the rookie Johnson became the butt of a joke for collecting checks while unable to play due to the cast on his hand. "When I get out of this thing, I'm going to come out like a tiger!" Johnson replied. The nickname "Tiger" stuck forever.

During his nine years in the NFL as a player, all of which were with the 49ers, Johnson blocked at the center position for what was known as the Million Dollar Backfield in San Francisco, which featured fullbacks John Henry Johnson and Joe Perry, halfback Hugh McElhenny, and quarterback Y. A. Tittle. Johnson was heralded as the star of the offensive line of the 49ers, who constantly beat teams due to their ability to control the ball and wear down opponents. He earned two Pro Bowl selections, and was also voted to be an All-Pro.

=== Coaching ===
Johnson's career in coaching came in 1956, when the 49ers fired head coach Red Strader after one season and hired former start quarterback Frankie Albert as his replacement. "Frank and I were close friends, so he hired me as his offensive line coach," Johnson later recalled, adding that due to injury he was forced to return to active player status during that season. He retired for keeps after the 1956 campaign and began a nearly stint of two decades as a 49ers coach.

Johnson as an assistant coach for the 49ers in 1961.

Johnson made a parallel move to become a line coach for the Cincinnati Bengals in 1968, working on Paul Brown's staff along with future 49er coaching great Bill Walsh. When Brown retired as the team's head coach, he named Tiger as his successor — crushing Walsh's hopes of winning the position and spurring his departure to take a head coaching job at Stanford University, and eventually, the 49ers, where he won 3 Super Bowls, including 2 over the Bengals.

During his stint as Bengals head coach, Tiger won 18 and lost 15, but resigned five games into the 1978 season after starting 0–5. He, Forrest Gregg, and Marvin Lewis are the only coaches in franchise history to leave the team with a winning record.

After his head coaching tenure, Johnson was an assistant coach for the Tampa Bay Buccaneers from 1979 to 1982 and the Detroit Lions from 1983 to 1984. He finished his career by reuniting with the Bengals as an assistant in 1985 under head coach Sam Wyche.

He retired as the Bengals tight ends coach in 1990.

== Death and legacy ==
Johnson died on January 7, 2011, in Fort Myers, Florida at the age of 84. Surviving were his wife Dot, three children, and four grandchildren.

Johnson's eldest son, Bill Jr., was the former CEO of HJ Heinz.
