= Joe Perry (American football) =

American football player (1927–2011)

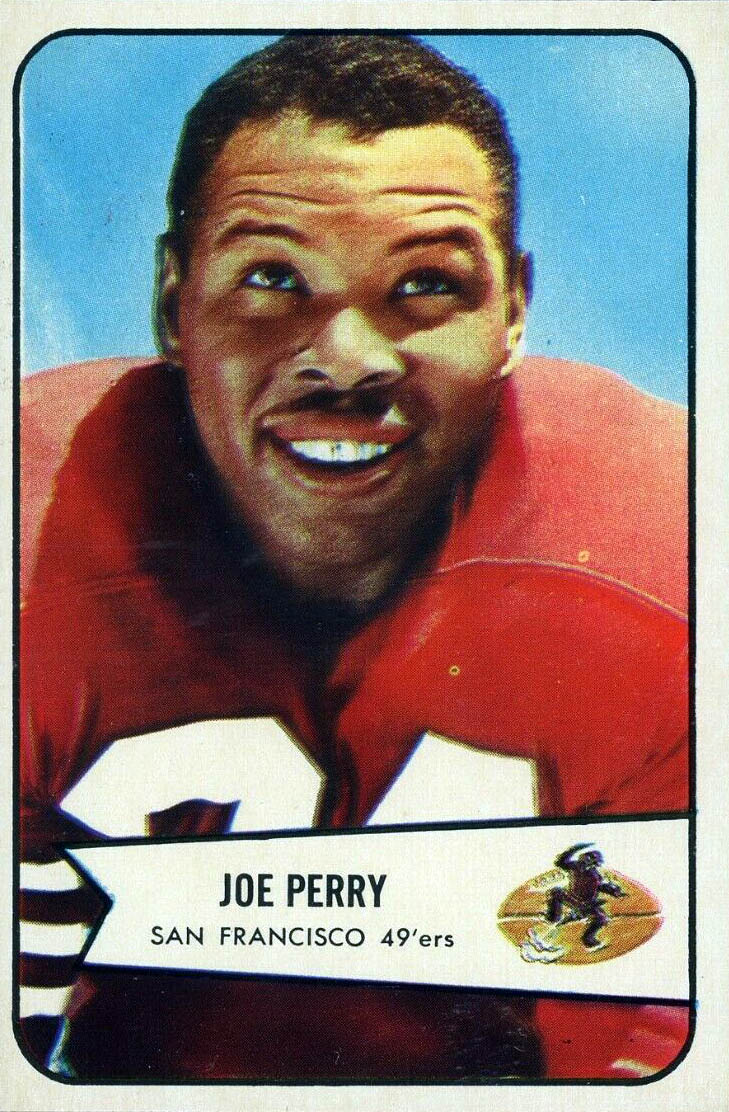
- Perry c. 1954

No. 74, 34
- Position: Fullback

Personal information
- Born: January 22, 1927; Stephens, Arkansas, U.S.
- Died: April 25, 2011 (aged 84); Chandler, Arizona, U.S.
- Listed height: 6 ft 0 in (1.83 m)
- Listed weight: 200 lb (91 kg)

Career information
- High school: Jordan (Los Angeles, California)
- College: Compton (1944)
- NFL draft: 1948: undrafted

Career history

Playing
- San Francisco 49ers (1948–1960); Baltimore Colts (1961–1962); San Francisco 49ers (1963)

Coaching
- San Francisco 49ers (1968–1969) Kickers coach

Awards and highlights
- NFL Most Valuable Player (1954); 3× First-team All-Pro (1949, 1953, 1954); 3× Pro Bowl (1952–1954); 2× NFL rushing yards leader (1953, 1954); NFL rushing touchdowns leader (1953); AAFC rushing yards leader (1949); 2× AAFC rushing touchdowns co-leader (1948, 1949); NFL 1950s All-Decade Team; San Francisco 49ers Hall of Fame; San Francisco 49ers No. 34 retired

Career AAFC/NFL statistics
- Rushing yards: 9,723
- Rushing average: 5
- Rushing touchdowns: 71
- Receptions: 260
- Receiving yards: 2,021
- Receiving touchdowns: 12
- Stats at Pro Football Reference
- Pro Football Hall of Fame

Fletcher Joseph Perry (January 22, 1927 – April 25, 2011) was an American professional football fullback who played in the All-America Football Conference (AAFC) and National Football League (NFL). He played for the San Francisco 49ers from 1948 to 1960, the Baltimore Colts from 1961 to 1962, and returned to the 49ers in 1963 for his final year in football. He was exceptionally fast, a trait uncommon for a fullback and one which earned him the nickname, "the Jet". The first African-American to be named the NFL Most Valuable Player (MVP), he became one of American football's first black stars.

After playing a season of college football for the Compton Junior College, Perry joined the U.S. Navy. While playing football in the military, he was spotted by the 49ers, who signed him into the AAFC. He spent the next 13 seasons playing for San Francisco, where he was featured in the "Million Dollar Backfield", made three straight Pro Bowl appearances, and in 1954 was named the NFL MVP. He was the first player in the NFL to rush for 1,000 yards in consecutive seasons, doing so in 1953 and 1954. Perry retired in 1963 as the league's all-time leader in rushing yards, and in 1969 he was inducted into the Pro Football Hall of Fame. His jersey number 34 was retired by the 49ers in 1971.

== Early life ==
Fletcher Joseph Perry was born in Stephens, Arkansas, and grew up in Los Angeles, California, after his family moved there during the Great Depression. He was a four-sport star at David Starr Jordan High School in Los Angeles. As a freshman on the varsity football team, he was named third-team All-City. Perry grew up admiring several African-American athletes at the University of California at Los Angeles (UCLA), including Jackie Robinson, who played football and baseball and ran track for the university.

== College career ==
After being rejected by UCLA, Perry played football at Compton Junior College in 1944, and scored a program record 22 touchdowns that season. He also competed on the track and field team, running the 100-yard dash in 9.7 seconds.

== Navy ==
Perry was then recruited by UCLA, but declined, and enlisted in the Navy during World War II. He served as a coxswain in the Pacific until the end of the war, after which he was reassigned to Naval Air Station Alameda to assist in decommissioning ships. While serving in the Navy, Perry continued to play football and also pitched for the softball team. In an East vs. West college all-star game in January 1948, Perry scored on a four-yard run in the first quarter for the West, which also featured Bobby Layne of Texas and Jake Leicht of Oregon.

== Professional career ==
Standing 6 ft 0 in (1.83 m) tall and weighing 200 lb (91 kg), Perry was small for a typical fullback, even during his era. Also unlike typical fullbacks, Perry's forte was not to run with power, as he was a straight-ahead runner who combined power and speed with deceptive elusiveness. His role was primarily as a ball carrier rather than a blocker, and he had a knack for finding holes in opposing defensive lines. "If you saw a hole, you take it," Perry described his running style to The Sacramento Bee. "If you didn't, you kept moving until you did. You run with instinct." Perry was known for his speed, which earned him the nickname "the Jet". He ran the 100-yard dash in 9.5 seconds in 1947, two-tenths of a second slower than Mel Patton's then-world record of 9.3 seconds.

=== San Francisco 49ers ===
==== 1948–1952: AAFC and first Pro Bowl ====
While playing for Alameda, Perry was scouted by the NFL's Los Angeles Rams, who offered him a $9,500 salary. He turned down the offer and instead signed with the San Francisco 49ers of the AAFC for $4,500. His decision was based on his trust in 49ers owner Tony Morabito, who Perry described as like a father. He was the team's first African-American player.

Joe "The Jet" Perry in 1949

It was during his first practices with the 49ers that he earned his nickname, when quarterback Frankie Albert exclaimed, "You're like a jet, Joe," after Perry had shot out of his stance so quickly that Albert could not hand him the ball in time. Albert's successor at quarterback, Y. A. Tittle, echoed his sentiments. "He was the fastest player off the ball in the history of the world," Tittle told the San Francisco Chronicle. "You'd take the ball from center and turn, and he was already gone through the hole." Tittle became one of Perry's closest friends.

Black players were a novelty in pro football when Perry entered the league, and he was faced with racial abuse and discrimination on and off the field. "I can't remember a season when I didn't hear a racial slur," he said. "Someone would say, 'Nigger, don't come through here again', and I'd say, 'I'm coming through again, and you better bring your family.'"

When he was invited to play in the 1949 AAFC All-Star game in Houston, he and other black players on the all-star team were not allowed to stay in the same hotel as white players. There was initial uncertainty over whether or not black players would be allowed to participate in the game at all. Perry's 49ers teammates, however, were more accepting of him, and provided him strong support from the outset.

With the 49ers in the AAFC, Perry led the league in rushing touchdowns in both 1948 in 1949, and also in rushing yards in 1949. He had the first and only kick return touchdown of his career in 1948 when he returned a kickoff 87 yards against the Brooklyn Dodgers. Following the season, Perry was invited to play in the 1949 AAFC All-Star game against the league champion Cleveland Browns. The AAFC folded soon after and the 49ers were absorbed into the NFL in 1950.

Perry finished fifth among league rushing leaders in both 1950 and 1951. The 49ers acquired halfback Hugh McElhenny in the 1952 Draft, who joined Perry in the backfield to form a prolific rushing duo. He and McElhenny finished third and fourth in the league respectively in rushing yards that season. Following the season, Perry was invited to play in his first Pro Bowl.

==== 1953 and 1954: Back-to-back 1,000-yard seasons ====
Perry became the first player to eclipse 1,000 rushing yards in consecutive seasons, when he did so in 1953 and 1954. His 1,018 yards rushing in 1953 and 1,049 in 1954 were the third and second highest totals for a single season in the NFL, respectively, behind only Steve Van Buren's 1,146 yards in 1949. He led the league in carries, rushing yards, rushing yards per game, and yards from scrimmage in both seasons. His ten rushing touchdowns and 13 total touchdowns in 1953 were both the most in the NFL that year. Perry, McElhenny, and Tittle comprised the offensive backfield of that year's Pro Bowl. The Associated Press (AP), United Press (UP), and New York Daily News each named Perry their first-team All-Pro fullback. Morabito awarded Perry an extra five dollars for every yard he gained in 1953, for a total bonus of $5,090.

With the 49ers' acquisition of halfback John Henry Johnson in 1954, Perry had a reliable blocker to run behind. The backfield of Perry, Johnson, Tittle, and McElhenny—which became known as the "Million Dollar Backfield"—shattered the 49ers team record for rushing yards in a season. Despite having to split more carries between him and his teammates, Perry again led the NFL in rushing yards. He gained almost 400 yards more than his nearest competitor, his backfield mate Johnson. A. S. "Doc" Young, writing for Jet magazine, called Perry "the bellwether of the greatest rushing backfield in pro football." The United Press named Perry its Pro Player of the Year, the first black player so honored. He was a first-team All-Pro for the AP, UP, New York Daily News, and The Sporting News, and played in his third straight Pro Bowl.

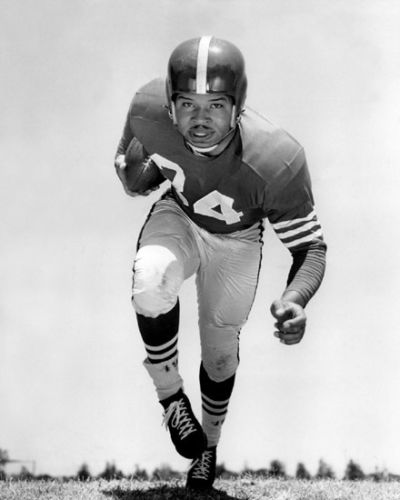
Perry in 1963

==== 1955–1960: All-time rushing leader ====
Prior to a game against the Cleveland Browns at Kezar Stadium in 1955, the 49ers staged "Joe Perry Day", in which fans honored Perry with gifts including a new car. "I was a favorite son," he said of the occasion. "I just thought Joe Perry Day was one of the great honors in my life." He had 20 carries in that game for 116 yards, out-gaining the entire Browns backfield and prompting Cleveland coach Paul Brown to remark, "This was Joe Perry's day in more ways than one." Perry accounted for 701 rushing yards and two touchdowns in 1955, leading the 49ers in rushing for the seventh straight season. His streak was snapped by McElhenny in 1956.

The closest Perry came to winning a championship with the 49ers was in 1957, as San Francisco finished with an 8–4 record but lost the Western Conference tiebreaker game to the Detroit Lions. He led the 49ers in rushing for the final time in 1958, with 758 yards. That season, he surpassed Steve Van Buren for first place on the NFL's all-time rushing yards list. He was named a first-team All-Pro by The Sporting News. The following year, he shared carries with fullback J.D. Smith. Perry carried only 36 times for 95 yards in 1960 as Smith took over the starting role. After the season, Perry was traded to the Baltimore Colts.

=== Baltimore Colts, return to San Francisco, and retirement ===
Colts head coach Weeb Ewbank cited injuries to fullback Alan Ameche as the key reason for the team's inability to win a third straight NFL championship. Ewbank hoped Perry could fill in the role if Ameche was not ready when the season began. Ameche retired prior to the season, and Perry filled in to lead the Colts in rushing in 1961, while catching a career-high 34 passes for 322 yards. "Joe was the kind of guy you'd love to play your whole career with," said Colts quarterback Johnny Unitas. "He was older when we got him, but he did well for us. He was amazing on the screen pass, like McElhenny. And Joe clawed and scratched for every yard." A thigh ligament injury caused him to miss several games in 1962 which, along with an injury to halfback Lenny Moore, severely hampered the Colts' running game. He was traded back to San Francisco in 1963, where he played a diminished role in his final nine games before retiring at age 36.

== NFL career statistics ==
Legend
	NFL MVP
	Led the league
**Bold**	Career high

=== Regular season ===
Year	Team	GP	Rushing						Receiving				
Year	Team	GP	Att	Yds	Avg	Lng	TD	Y/G	Rec	Yds	Avg	Lng	TD
1948	SF	14	77	562	**7.3**	57	**10**	40.1	8	79	9.9	–	1
1949	SF	11	115	783	6.8	59	8	71.2	11	146	**13.3**	–	**3**
1950	SF	12	124	647	5.2	**78**	5	53.9	13	69	5.3	16	1
1951	SF	11	136	677	5.0	58	3	61.5	18	167	9.3	35	1
1952	SF	12	158	725	4.6	**78**	8	60.4	15	81	5.4	17	0
1953	SF	12	**192**	1,018	5.3	51	**10**	84.8	19	191	10.1	60	**3**
1954	SF	12	173	**1,049**	6.1	58	8	**87.4**	26	203	7.8	**70**	0
1955	SF	11	156	701	4.5	42	2	63.7	19	55	2.9	19	1
1956	SF	11	115	520	4.5	39	3	47.3	18	104	5.8	20	0
1957	SF	10	97	454	4.7	34	3	45.4	15	130	8.7	17	0
1958	SF	12	125	758	6.1	73	4	63.2	23	218	9.5	64	1
1959	SF	11	139	602	4.3	40	3	54.7	12	53	4.4	15	0
1960	SF	10	36	95	2.6	21	1	9.5	3	-3	-1.0	3	0
1961	BAL	13	168	675	4.0	27	3	51.9	**34**	**322**	9.5	27	1
1962	BAL	12	94	359	3.8	21	0	29.9	22	194	8.8	32	0
1963	SF	9	24	98	4.1	16	0	10.9	4	12	3.0	8	0
Career		183	1,929	9,723	5.0	78	71	53.1	260	2,021	7.8	70	12

== Other ventures and later life ==
In addition to his football career, Perry also hosted a popular sports and music radio program, "Both Sides Of The Record", sponsored by Burgermeister Beer ("Burgie"), on R&B-formatted KWBR (1310 AM; later known as KDIA) beginning in 1954. The program was arranged by Franklin Mieuli, a sports entrepreneur who worked in marketing for Burgie, in addition to being a part-owner of the 49ers and producer of the team's radio and television broadcasts. After retiring from football, Perry competed in the Professional Bowlers Association Tour and carried an average of over 200. He also served as a scout and assistant for the 49ers, and later was a sales representative for E & J Gallo Winery.

== Death and legacy ==
The 49ers announced that Perry died on Monday April 25, 2011 in Arizona of complications from dementia at the age of 84.

On June 9, 2011, it was announced that Perry and his fellow Million Dollar Backfield teammate, John Henry Johnson, who died on June 3, 2011, would have their brains examined by researchers at Boston University who are studying head injuries in sports. Both men were suspected of having chronic traumatic encephalopathy (CTE), a disorder linked to repeated brain trauma. Perry's widow, Donna, told the San Francisco Chronicle that she believes her husband had CTE. She further told the newspaper that "When Joe was playing, they'd give them smelling salts and put them back in. "Now the equipment is better, and they're looking into ways to protect them. We have to look at what this is doing to our children."

Autopsies of Perry and Johnson found that both had CTE. They are two of at least 345 NFL players to be diagnosed after death with this disease, which is caused by repeated hits to the head.

Perry's durability allowed him to play in three decades, from the 1940s to the 1960s, for 16 seasons. He was the NFL's career rushing leader from 1958 to 1963, ultimately compiling 8,378 yards; his record was broken by Jim Brown on October 20, 1963. His 7,344 rushing yards for the 49ers stood as the franchise record for nearly 60 years before it was broken in 2011 by Frank Gore. As of 2020, Perry's 68 rushing touchdowns with the team remains a franchise record.

He was inducted into the Pro Football Hall of Fame in 1969, his first year of eligibility. Also in that year's class was longtime teammate, tackle Leo Nomellini. The 49ers' Million Dollar Backfield is the only full-house backfield to have all four of its members enshrined in the Hall. Perry's jersey number 34 was retired by the 49ers in 1971, and he was a charter member of the San Francisco 49ers Hall of Fame in 2009. Following his death in 2011, the team honored Perry that season by wearing helmet decals with his number 34 on them.

== See also ==
- Black players in professional American football
- List of Pro Football Hall of Fame inductees
- List of NFL players with chronic traumatic encephalopathy
