= Tom Keane =

American football player (1926–2001)

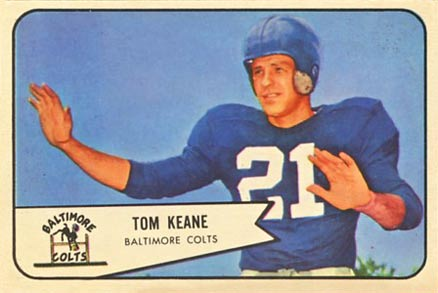
- Keane on a 1954 Bowman football card

No. 10, 21
- Positions: Cornerback, end

Personal information
- Born: September 7, 1926; Bellaire, Ohio, U.S.
- Died: June 1, 2001 (aged 74); Miami, Florida, U.S.
- Listed height: 6 ft 1 in (1.85 m)
- Listed weight: 192 lb (87 kg)

Career information
- High school: Linsly Military Institute (Wheeling, West Virginia)
- College: Ohio State (1944); West Virginia (1946-1947)
- NFL draft: 1948: 3rd round, 18th overall pick

Career history

Playing
- Los Angeles Rams (1948–1949); Chicago Cardinals (1950)*; Los Angeles Rams (1950–1951); Dallas Texans (1952); Baltimore Colts (1953–1954); Chicago Cardinals (1955)
- * Offseason or practice squad member only

Coaching
- Chicago Cardinals (1957–1959) Defensive backs coach; Wheeling Ironmen (1962–1964) Head coach; Pittsburgh Steelers (1965) Defensive backs coach; Miami Dolphins (1966–1975) Defensive backs coach; Miami Dolphins (1976–1983) Defensive backs coach / Special teams; Miami Dolphins (1984) Defensive backs coach; Miami Dolphins (1985) Special teams

Awards and highlights
- NFL champion (1951); First-team All-Pro (1953); Second-team All-Pro (1954); Pro Bowl (1953); As a coach: 2x Super Bowl champion (VII, VIII)

Career NFL statistics
- Interceptions: 40
- Fumble recoveries: 10
- Receptions: 34
- Receiving yards: 551
- Total touchdowns: 3
- Stats at Pro Football Reference

Thomas Lawrence Keane (September 7, 1926 – June 19, 2001) was an American professional football player who was a cornerback in the National Football League (NFL). He played college football for the Ohio State Buckeyes and West Virginia Mountaineers. Keane recorded 40 interceptions as a player and recorded two seasons with at least 10 interceptions (1952, 1953), making him the third of just seven players to do so in pro football history and he is one of just two with consecutive seasons of 10 interceptions.

== Early life ==
Keane played football and graduated from Linsly Military Institute in Wheeling, West Virginia (now known as the Linsly School) in 1944. During his high school career, he was an All-OVAC selection in football and basketball in 1943 and 1944. He was also All-City in basketball.

== College career ==
He then went to play football at Ohio State University where he lettered as a freshman. After freshman year, he joined the United States Navy where he served for 20 months. After the navy he enrolled at West Virginia University, where he lettered in football in 1946 and 1947.

== Professional career ==
Keane was selected by the Los Angeles Rams in the third round, with the 18th overall pick, of the 1948 NFL draft. He played for the Rams from 1948 to 1949. On June 2, 1950, Keane, Bob Shaw, and Gerard Cowhig were traded to the Chicago Cardinals for Bob Reinhard. Keane was released by the Cardinals on September 11, 1950. He was re-signed by the Rams on September 20, 1950, and played for them during the 1950 and 1951 seasons. He won the 1951 NFL title with the Rams. In 1952, the Rams traded him again to the expansion Dallas Texans, one of eleven players sent to Dallas in exchange for future Hall of Famer Les Richter. (Of the eleven, Keane turned out to be the only one to play in the NFL beyond 1952; six of them never played a down for Dallas or any other NFL team.) Due to injuries, he was occasionally used on offense, catching three passes for 73 yards. Keane moved with the Texans from Dallas to Baltimore, playing for the Colts, and ended his career with the Chicago Cardinals in 1955. During his career he was selected All-Pro twice and played in the 1953 Pro Bowl.

== Coaching career ==
Keane served as an assistant for the Chicago Cardinals from 1957 to 1959. From 1962 to 1964 he served as head coach of the Wheeling Ironmen of the United Football League. Then he went back to the NFL to the Pittsburgh Steelers as an assistant in 1965. He served as a longtime assistant to the Miami Dolphins where he coached from 1966 to 1985. He was one of the assistants on the 1972 undefeated Miami Dolphins team under head coach Don Shula.
