= Ray Evans (offensive lineman) =

American football player (1924–2008)

No. 46, 38
- Positions: Guard, tackle

Personal information
- Born: January 10, 1924; Electra, Texas, U.S.
- Died: April 25, 2008 (aged 84); Salem, Oregon, U.S.
- Listed height: 6 ft 1 in (1.85 m)
- Listed weight: 225 lb (102 kg)

Career information
- High school: Odessa (Odessa, Texas)
- College: UTEP (1942, 1946-1947)
- NFL draft: 1946: 16th round, 141st overall pick

Career history
- San Francisco 49ers (1949-1950)

Career NFL/AAFC statistics
- Games played: 22
- Games started: 1
- Stats at Pro Football Reference

Raymond Leroy "Sugar" Evans (January 10, 1924 – April 25, 2008) was an American football lineman who played at the guard and tackle positions.

A native of Electra, Texas, he attended Odessa Hills High School and played college football for the Texas Mines Miners. He began his college career in 1942 as a fullback, but he then served in the Seabees during World War II. He returned to the college after the war, moved to the line, and won all-conference honors in 1947 and again in 1948. At the end the 1948 season, he was selected by the conference coaches as the Border Conference lineman of the year.

Evans initially signed to play professional football with the Cleveland Browns but was waived by the Browns at the end of August 1949. He was then sold to the San Francisco 49ers in early September 1949. He played for the 49ers during the 1949 and 1950 seasons, appearing in 22 NFL games.

Evans died in 2008 at Salem, Oregon.
