= Clarence Howell (American football) =

American football player (1927–1981)

- Clarence Howell, 1946

No. 56
- Position: End

Personal information
- Born: September 22, 1927; Houston, Texas, U.S.
- Died: October 6, 1981; Houston, Texas, U.S.
- Listed height: 6 ft 1 in (1.85 m)
- Listed weight: 188 lb (85 kg)

Career information
- High school: Nacogdoches (TX)
- College: Texas A&M

Career history
- San Francisco 49ers (1948); Richmond Rebels (1949)

Awards and highlights
- Second-team All-SWC (1944)

Career statistics
- Games: 12
- Stats at Pro Football Reference

John Clarence Maurice "Cotton" Howell (September 22, 1927 – October 6, 1981) was an American football player who played at the end position. He played college football for Texas A&M and professional football for the San Francisco 49ers.

== Early life ==
Howell was born in 1927 in Houston. He attended and played football at Nacogdoches High School.

== Military and college football ==
He played college football for the Texas A&M Aggies in 1944, 1946, and 1947. He was selected as a second-team end on the 1944 All-Southwest Conference football team. He also served in the United States Merchant Marine.

== Professional football ==
Howell played professional football in the All-America Football Conference for the San Francisco 49ers during their 1948 season. He appeared in 12 of 14 games for the 1948 49ers. He also played for the 1949 Richmond Rebels team that won the American Football League championship.

== Family and later years ==
Howell died in 1981 at age 54 in Houston.
