= Don Garlin =

American football player (1926–1999)

Profile
- Positions: Halfback, defensive back

Personal information
- Born: November 10, 1926; Porterville, California
- Died: June 29, 1999 (aged 72); Sebastopol, California
- Listed height: 5 ft 11 in (1.80 m)
- Listed weight: 188 lb (85 kg)

Career information
- High school: Porterville (CA)
- College: USC

Career history
- Bainbridge Navy (1945); San Francisco 49ers (1949–1950)

Career statistics
- Games: 19
- Stats at Pro Football Reference

Donald Arthur Garlin (November 10, 1926 – July 29, 1999) was an American football halfback and defensive back.

Garlin was born in Porterville, California, and attended Porterville High School. He then enrolled at the University of Southern California and played college football for the USC Trojans in 1944 and from 1946 to 1948. He was drafted at the end of November 1944 and did not play for USC in 1945 due to his service in the Navy. He played for the 1945 Bainbridge Navy football team.

He was selected by the San Francisco 49ers in the 14th round (108th overall pick) of the 1949 AAFC Draft. He played for the 49ers during their 1949 and 1950 seasons. He appeared in 19 NFL games and carried the ball 24 times for 116 yards and one touchdown. On November 13, 1949, he executed his longest play from scrimmage, a 60-yard end run in a victory over the Los Angeles Dons at the Los Angeles Coliseum where he played in college. He also caught six passes for 64 yards and tallied one interception.

Garlin lived in Bodega Bay, California, in his later years. He died in 1999 in Sebastopol, California.
