= Jack Nix (American football, born 1928) =

American gridiron football player (1928–2024)

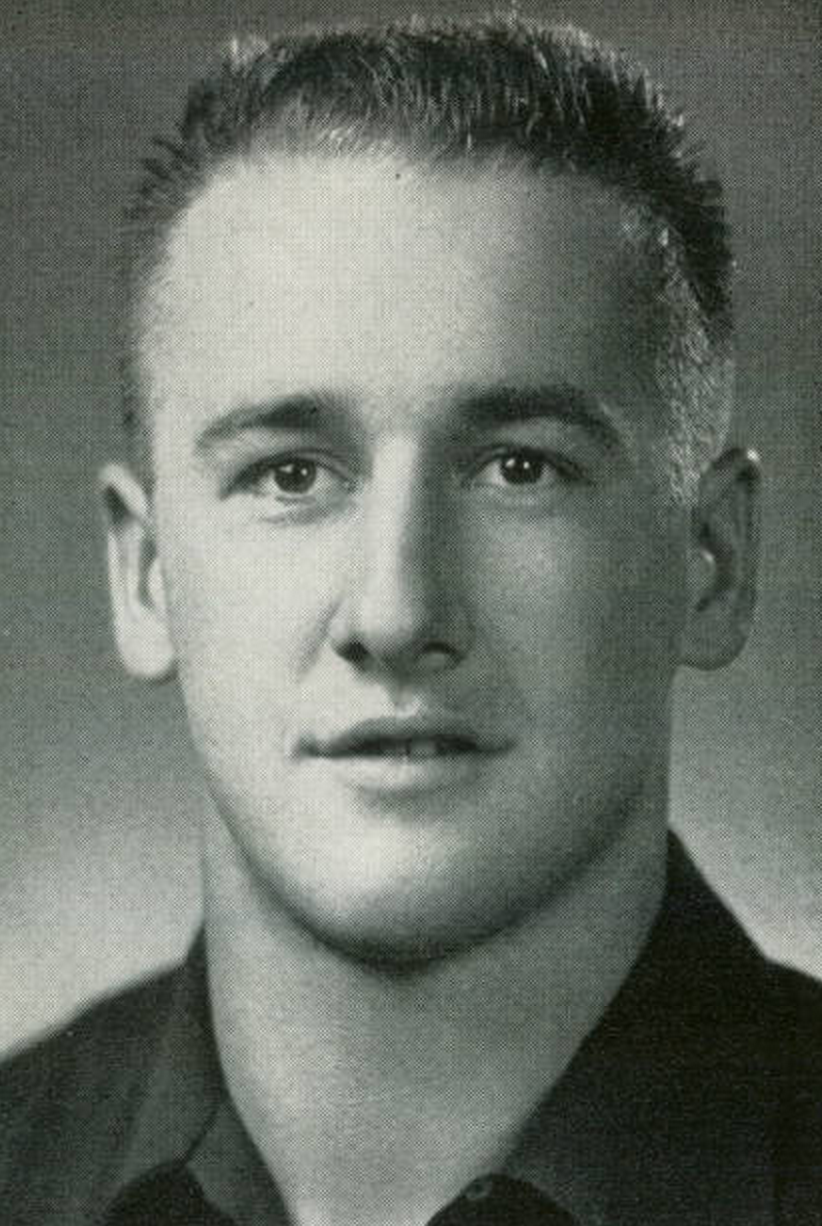
- Nix pictured at USC c. 1950

No. 58
- Position: End

Personal information
- Born: May 7, 1928; Gary, Indiana, U.S.
- Died: April 11, 2024 (aged 95)
- Listed height: 6 ft 2 in (1.88 m)
- Listed weight: 200 lb (91 kg)

Career information
- High school: Susan Miller Dorsey (Los Angeles, California)
- College: USC
- NFL draft: 1950: 20th round, 257th overall pick

Career history
- San Francisco 49ers (1950); Saskatchewan Roughriders (1951)

Awards and highlights
- CFL West All-Star 1951

Career NFL statistics
- Receptions: 9
- Receiving yards: 114
- Stats at Pro Football Reference

Jack Louis Nix (born Niksch; May 7, 1928 – April 11, 2024) was an American professional football player who was an end in the National Football League (NFL) and Canadian Football League (CFL).

Nix was born in Gary, Indiana. He attended Susan Miller Dorsey High School in the Crenshaw District of Los Angeles, California, and played college football at the University of Southern California. Nix was selected 257th overall by the San Francisco 49ers in the 20th round of the 1950 NFL draft. He spent one season with the 49ers, appearing in nine games. He then joined the Saskatchewan Roughriders of the CFL, again spending one season with the team.

Nix married Celia May Park of Regina in 1952. He died on April 11, 2024, at the age of 95.
