= Paul Barry (American football) =

American football player (1926–2014)

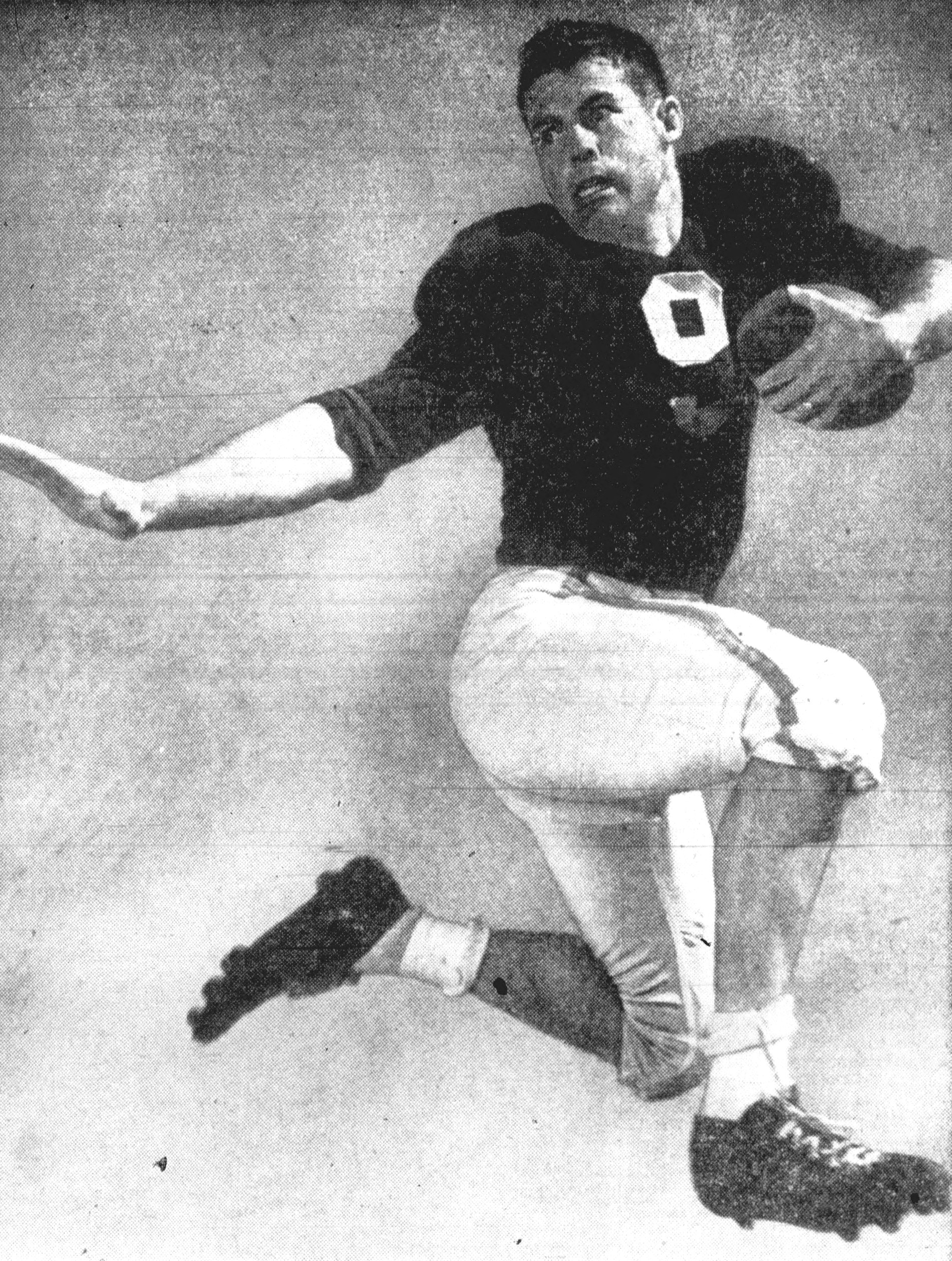
- Barry, circa 1950

No. 9, 23, 29, 44
- Positions: Fullback, halfback

Personal information
- Born: August 7, 1926; El Paso, Texas, U.S.
- Died: December 28, 2014 (aged 88); El Paso, Texas, U.S.
- Listed height: 6 ft 0 in (1.83 m)
- Listed weight: 208 lb (94 kg)

Career information
- High school: Ysleta (El Paso)
- College: Tulsa
- NFL draft: 1949: 13th round, 127th overall pick

Career history
- Los Angeles Rams (1950, 1952); Washington Redskins (1953); Chicago Cardinals (1954)

Career NFL statistics
- Rushing yards: 604
- Rushing average: 3.8
- Receptions: 24
- Receiving yards: 264
- Total touchdowns: 3
- Stats at Pro Football Reference

Paul F. Barry (August 7, 1926 – December 28, 2014) was an American professional football running back in the National Football League for the Los Angeles Rams, Washington Redskins, and Chicago Cardinals. He played college football at the University of Tulsa and was drafted in the thirteenth round of the 1949 NFL draft.
