= Harley Dow =

American football player (1925–2014)

- Dow, c. 1949

No. 40
- Positions: Guard, tackle

Personal information
- Born: October 19, 1925; Mt. Hope, Kansas, U.S.
- Died: March 25, 2014 (aged 88); Poway, California, U.S.
- Listed height: 6 ft 2 in (1.88 m)
- Listed weight: 220 lb (100 kg)

Career information
- High school: Verdugo Hills (CA)
- College: San Jose State
- NFL draft: 1950: 11th round, 141st overall pick

Career history
- San Francisco 49ers (1950)

Career NFL statistics
- Games played: 12
- Games started: 6
- Fumble recoveries: 1
- Stats at Pro Football Reference

Harley Duane "Moose" Dow (October 19, 1925 – March 25, 2014) was an American football and coach. He played at the guard and tackle positions for the San Jose State Spartans (1947–1949) and San Francisco 49ers (1950).

== Early life ==
A native of Mt. Hope, Kansas, he attended Verdugo Hills High School in Tujunga, Los Angeles, California. He played tennis, baseball, and basketball at Verdugo Hills. He did not play football, concentrating on basketball. In July, 1943, at age 17, Dow enlisted in the United States Marine Corps.

== San Jose State ==
Dow played college football for the San Jose State Spartans from 1947 to 1949. He was co-captain of the 1949 San Jose State Spartans football team that won the conference championship and defeated Texas Tech in the Raisin Bowl. At the end of the 1949 season, he was named to the United Press Little All-Coast football team.

In 1954, Dow was one of 33 football players included in the inaugural class of the San Jose State Spartans Hall of Fame.

== San Francisco 49ers ==
Dow was selected by the San Francisco 49ers in the 11th round (141st overall pick) in the 1950 NFL draft. He played for the 49ers during the 1950 season. He appeared in 12 NFL games, six of them as a starter. He was the only rookie named to the 49ers' starting lineup in 1950.

== Coaching career ==
Dow received a bachelor's degree from San Jose State i in 1950 and later received a master's degree from Stanford. later coached football at San Jose Junior College )*SJJC). He was the line coach under Fred Silva from 1956 to 1959 and became head football coach in 1961. He also served as SJCC's head baseball coach starting in 1956 and head track coach in 1956. He also served for many years as golf coach at San Jose City College.

== Later life ==
Dow died in 2014 at age 88 in Poway, California.
