= Visco Grgich =

American football player (1923–2005)

- Grgich in 1949

No. 49, 47, 37, 34, 64
- Positions: Guard, tackle, linebacker

Personal information
- Born: January 19, 1923; Zlarin, Kingdom of Serbs, Croats and Slovenes
- Died: December 26, 2005 (aged 82); Modesto, California, U.S.
- Listed height: 5 ft 11 in (1.80 m)
- Listed weight: 217 lb (98 kg)

Career information
- High school: West Seattle (Seattle, Washington)
- College: Santa Clara (1942)
- NFL draft: 1946: 24th round, 224th overall pick

Career history
- San Francisco 49ers (1946-1952)

Awards and highlights
- 3× AAFC All-Pro; Pro Bowl (1950)

Career NFL statistics
- Games played: 78
- Games started: 50
- Fumble recoveries: 5
- Stats at Pro Football Reference

Visco Grgich (January 19, 1923 – December 26, 2005) was a professional American football lineman who played in the All-America Football Conference and the National Football League. He played seven seasons for the San Francisco 49ers.

== Biography ==
Visco Grgich was originally drafted in the 24th round with the 224th overall pick by the Chicago Bears in the 1946 NFL draft. Grgich was known as a tough and sometimes vicious two-way lineman who loved to intimidate Norm Van Brocklin. Grgich was also known for his rousing pep talks prior to games and was even brought back by Coach Frank Albert to give pep talks after his playing days were through. At the end of his pep talk, Grgich would say "This is the way you've gotta do it!" and would promptly deliver a forearm shiver to the nearest door, wall or even one of the wooden support posts in Kezar Stadium which was rumoured to be felt throughout Kezar Stadium. He is distinguished as being the first Yugoslav to play in the National Football League.

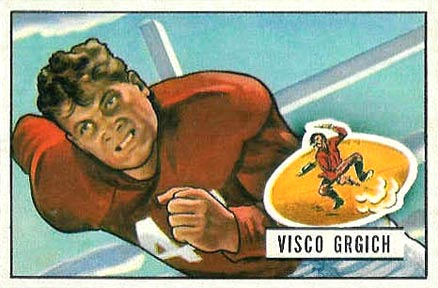
Grgich on a 1951 Bowman football card.

Grgich's playing career was ended by a knee injury in 1952, at which time he became a car salesman until former coach Buck Shaw demanded he turn to coaching. Grgich became the head football coach at Oakdale High School, in Oakdale, California in 1957 and 1958. He later became the offensive line coach for several years at Oakdale High School.

In 1985, Visco and other Grgich family members competed on an episode of Family Feud against the Hatfield family.

Grgich taught drivers education at Oakdale High School until he retired in 1986. As a teacher he was greatly loved by his many students who quickly learned you could derail a day's instruction at the mere mention of the San Francisco 49ers, at which time Grgich would bring out old reel movies of San Francisco 49ers games from his playing days. In 1982 his students raised money to pay his way to Detroit to watch his beloved San Francisco 49ers play the Cincinnati Bengals in Super Bowl XVI. Visco continued to live in the Oakdale, California area until he was moved to Dale Commons assisted-living facility in Modesto, California shortly prior to his wife Grace, the country and western singer known as "Sioux City Sue," died in 2001. Visco and Sue had 4 children, Steve, Vikki, Toni and Mike. Steve later founded Grgich Family Catering. Visco died Monday December 26, 2005 at a Modesto, California hospital.
