= Bruno Banducci =

American football player (1921–1985)

- Banducci in 1949

No. 33, 63, 38
- Positions: Guard, tackle

Personal information
- Born: November 11, 1921; Tassignano, Italy
- Died: September 15, 1985 (aged 63); Sonoma, California, U.S.
- Listed height: 5 ft 11 in (1.80 m)
- Listed weight: 216 lb (98 kg)

Career information
- High school: Richmond (Richmond, California)
- College: Stanford (1939–1942)
- NFL draft: 1943: 6th round, 42nd overall pick

Career history

Playing
- Philadelphia Eagles (1944–1945); San Francisco 49ers (1946–1954); Toronto Argonauts (1955)

Coaching
- Philadelphia Eagles (1958) Line coach

Awards and highlights
- 2× First-team All-Pro (1947, 1954); 2× Second-team All-Pro (1952, 1953); Pro Bowl (1954); NFL 1940s All-Decade Team; First-team All-PCC (1940); 2× Second-team All-PCC (1941, 1942)

Career NFL + AAFC statistics
- Games played: 122
- Starts: 97
- Fumble recoveries: 4
- Stats at Pro Football Reference

Bruno Banducci (November 11, 1921 – September 15, 1985) was an Italian-born, American football lineman in the National Football League (NFL) from 1944 to 1945 for the Philadelphia Eagles and the San Francisco 49ers of the All-America Football Conference (AAFC) and the NFL from 1946 to 1954. He also played for the 1955 season with the Toronto Argonauts of the Canadian Football League (CFL).

He was twice named a first team All-Pro — once time each in the AAFC and the NFL. He was the last member of the founding 49ers team to leave the organization.

== Early life ==
Bruno Banducci was born November 11, 1921, in the village of Tassignano, part of the municipality of Capannori, Italy, located in northern Tuscany. He grew up in the San Francisco Bay area, attending Longfellow Junior High School in Richmond, California through 1935, before gaining promotion to Richmond Union High School in January 1936.

During his first year of high school, Banducci went out for the football team at the urging of the team's coach, making the squad as a reserve tackle. He had never seen an organized football game prior to going out for — and making — the team.

He was briefly switched to the guard position in 1937, his second year wearing the navy blue and red uniform of the Oilers. During his senior year in 1938, Banducci was firmly ensconced as Richmond's starting right tackle. He also handled kickoff duties.

Banducci was a prominent lineman, twice making the All-Conference team, but not a big regional star during his high school years. He initially planned on attending the University of California upon graduation from high school in the spring of 1939, but eventually decided upon Stanford, which offered him a four-year, full-ride athletic scholarship.

== College career ==
Freshmen were ineligible for varsity play in 1939, Banducci's first year at Stanford, so he anchored the line on the school's freshman football team, earning All-Conference honors as a tackle. The young tackle moved to the varsity in 1940 — a year which coincided with the hiring of new head coach Clark Shaughnessy. Shaughnessy introduced an entirely new offense to the Indians — the T-formation — which befuddled opponents.

"We were the first college team to use it," Banducci later recalled. "We ended up winning 13 straight games, and we were unbeaten and untied. We surprised a lot of teams because they didn't know how to defend against a T."

The so-called Stanford "Dream Team" of 1940 went on to win the 1941 Rose Bowl, topping the University of Nebraska by a score of 21–13.

Banducci earned All-Conference plaudits during his 1941 junior and 1942 senior seasons at the tackle position, and was an honorable mention on some All-America lists.

== Professional career ==
Banducci was drafted 42nd overall in the sixth round of the 1943 NFL draft. He played two seasons for the Philadelphia Eagles before jumping to the San Francisco 49ers of the rival All-America Football Conference (AAFC) in 1946.

According to Banducci, he returned home to the Bay area from Philadelphia and was approached by a representative of the 49ers about playing for them in the coming year. After an initial declination he reconsidered and signed a contract with the new home team — a deal which paid him $5,000 for the 1946 season and made him one of the highest-paid members of the inaugural San Francisco team.

Banducci would play nine seasons with the 49ers, serving as team captain for the last five. He earned a Pro Bowl nomination in 1954 and named an Associated Press first-team All-Pro in 1947 and 1954.

In 1948, Banducci was part of a starting line that helped the 49ers set a new professional football record for rushing yardage in a single season. Despite this achievement, the 49ers were slighted in the selection for post-season honors, however, as neither Banducci nor any of the other four starters in the interior line were named to the All-AAFC team.

The newly minted All-Pro guard and the money-losing San Francisco franchise were unable to come to financial terms for 1955, however, and no contract was forthcoming — effectively ending Balducci's tenure with the club. He was the last member of the inaugural 49ers team to exit the roster, his 1946 teammates Frankie Albert and Johnny Strzykalski having retired at the end of the 1952 campaign.

Instead, Banducci explored other options, signing to play the 1955 season in the Canadian Football League (CFL) as a member of the Toronto Argonauts. He saw action in 9 games during that year. Long in the tooth for the brutal game of football at age 35, Banducci additionally found the Toronto weather "too cold for a Californian like me" and retired after the 1955 season.

== Life after football ==
During the football off-season, Banducci had worked selling cars, so when his 12 seasons in professional football came to an end, he transitioned seamlessly into the role of full-time Cadillac salesman. He decided that this was not an appealing career course, however and began attending night school to become a school teacher. After gaining his teaching certification, Banducci was hired by Marin Catholic High School in Kentfield, California as an algebra teacher and head football coach.

In 1975, Banducci moved to the public school system, when he was hired by Sonoma Valley High School in Sonoma, California, where he taught and served as an assistant football coach. He remained in this position until the time of his death.

== Death and legacy ==
Banducci died September 15, 1985, in Sonoma, California, of an apparent heart attack. He was 63 years old at the time of his death.

Banducci was recalled by former 49ers teammate Joe Vetrano as "a helluva lineman, one of the best," as well as the team's best injury faker. Sportswriter Prescott Sullivan once wrote that Banducci was a past master of the "spurious swoon." "Faking injuries in order to stop the clock happens to be the thing Bruno does best. We do not mean to minimize the bull-necked 230-pounder's other talents, but it is only as a faker that he stands head and shoulders above the field. Indeed, he is so good at it that even if he had nothing else to offer, the 49ers could well afford to carry him on the payroll for his faking alone.... There's no telling how many games Bruno's specialty has won for the 49ers over the years."

Teammate Vetrano acknowledged Banducci's superior stalling abilities and credited his skill for forcing an NFL rule change requiring teams to burn a time out for injury in the last two minutes of a game if trainers went onto the field to check out a player.

The members of the Professional Football Researchers Association elected Banducci to its PRFA Hall of Very Good Class of 2009.
