= Forrest Hall =

American football player (1921–2001)

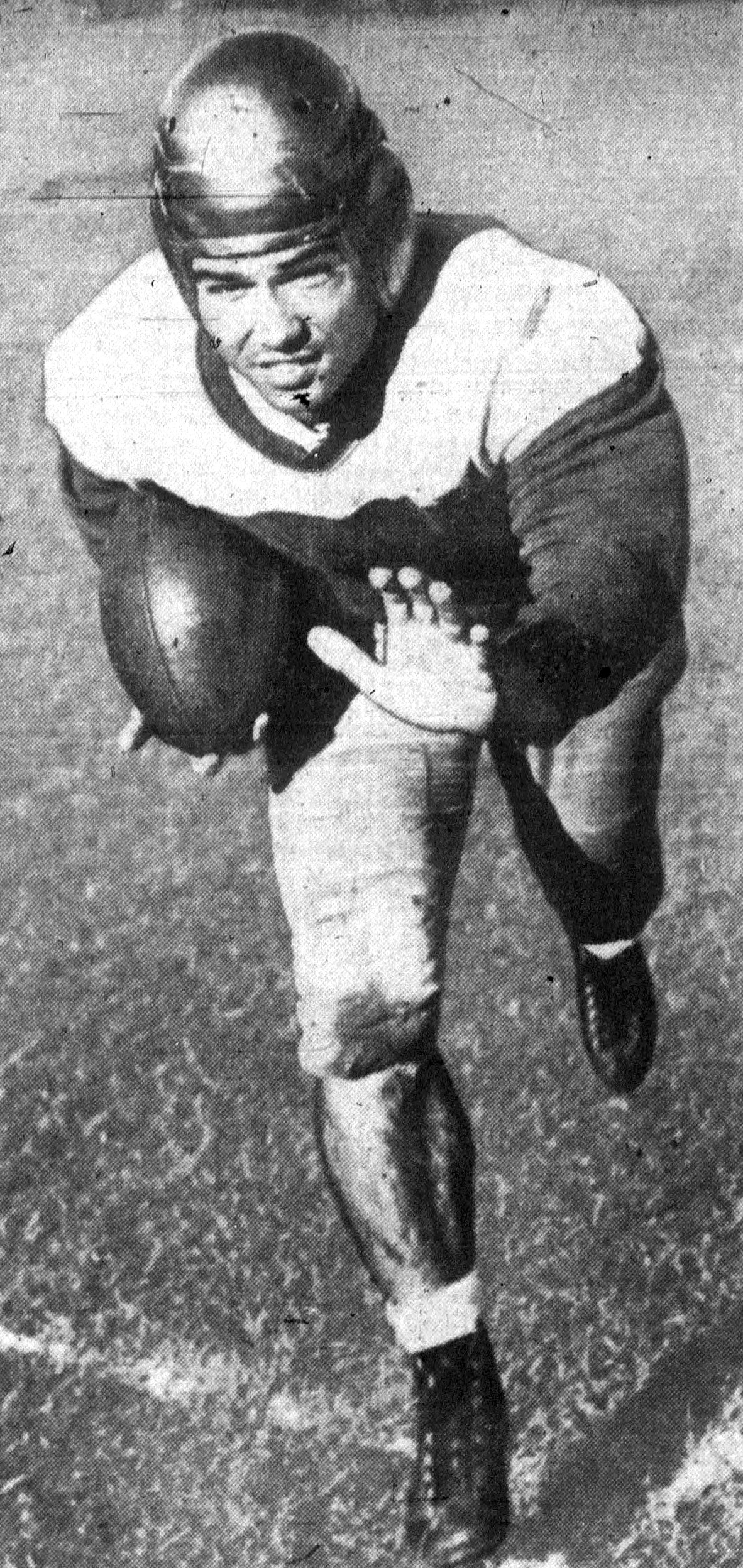
- Hall, circa 1947

No. 88, 21
- Positions: Running back, return specialist

Personal information
- Born: October 29, 1921; Oil City, Pennsylvania, U.S.
- Died: February 14, 2001 (aged 79); Phoenix, Arizona, U.S.
- Listed height: 5 ft 8 in (1.73 m)
- Listed weight: 155 lb (70 kg)

Career information
- High school: St. Joseph (Natrona Heights, Pennsylvania)
- College: Duquesne (1941-1942); San Francisco (1946-1947)
- NFL draft: 1945: 9th round, 85th overall pick

Career history
- San Francisco 49ers (1948); Erie Vets (1950)

Awards and highlights
- Third-team All-American (1946); First-team All-PCC (1946)

Career AAFC statistics
- Rushing yards: 413
- Rushing average: 6.3
- Rushing touchdowns: 2
- Receptions: 4
- Receiving yards: 87
- Return yards: 466
- Stats at Pro Football Reference

Forrest Hall (October 29, 1921 – February 14, 2001) was an American football running back and return specialist who played in the All-America Football Conference (AAFC) for the San Francisco Forty-Niners and American Football League (AFL) for the Erie Vets. He played college football at San Francisco.

== College career ==
Hall originally attended Duquesne University on a basketball scholarship. He played both basketball and football for two seasons before joining the Army Air Force during World War Two. In 1942, he rushed for a 60-yard touchdown to beat Villanova in a 6–0 upset victory. Hall played football for the Fourth Air Force's football team and eventually went to the East-West Shrine Game as the branch's representative. After the war, Hall enrolled at the University of San Francisco using the GI Bill and joined the San Francisco Dons football team. In his first season with the team, Hall set an NCAA record with 36.2 yards per kickoff return and was named All-Pacific Coast by the Associated Press.

== Professional career ==
Hall was selected 85th overall in the ninth round of the 1945 NFL Draft by the Philadelphia Eagles while still in the military. After graduating from San Francisco, Hall signed with the San Francisco 49ers of the All-America Football Conference. In his lone season with the 49ers, Hall rushed for 413 yards and two touchdowns on 66 carries while catching four passes for 87 yards and returning 13 kickoffs for 369 yards and three punts for 97 yards. He was retroactively named All-Pro by the Professional Football Researchers Association and NFL commissioner Pete Rozelle referred to him as his "personal favorite" 49er in the foreword to a book on the team in 1986. Hall played briefly for the Erie Vets of the American Association in 1950 before retiring from football.

== Post-football life ==
Hall worked part-time as an electrician while playing and began working full-time after his playing career ended until retiring when he was 65. Hall died on February 14, 2001.
