= Verl Lillywhite =

American football player (1926–2007)

- Lillywhite in 1949

No. 71, 81
- Positions: Halfback, defensive back, punter

Personal information
- Born: December 5, 1926; Garland, Utah, U.S.
- Died: July 14, 2007 (aged 80); Mesa, Arizona, U.S.
- Listed height: 5 ft 10 in (1.78 m)
- Listed weight: 185 lb (84 kg)

Career information
- High school: Inglewood (Inglewood, California)
- College: USC
- NFL draft: 1948: undrafted

Career history
- San Francisco 49ers (1948–1951)

Career AAFC/NFL statistics
- Games played: 47
- Starts: 16
- Yards rushing: 1,004
- Yards receiving: 212
- Touchdowns: 9
- Stats at Pro Football Reference

Verl Thomas Lillywhite (December 5, 1926 – July 14, 2007) was an American professional football halfback who played four seasons with the San Francisco 49ers. He played college football at Modesto Junior College and the University of Southern California.

== Early life and college ==
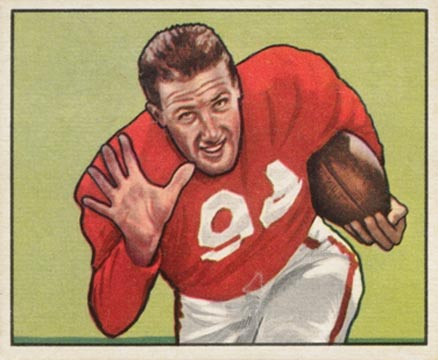
Lillywhite on a 1950 Bowman football card.

Verl Thomas Lillywhite was born on December 5, 1926, in Garland, Utah. He attended Inglewood High School in Inglewood, California.

Lillywhite first played college football at Modesto Junior College in 1944. He was then a three-year letterman for the USC Trojans of the University of Southern California from 1945 to 1947. He graduated from USC with a bachelor's degree in marketing.

== Professional career ==
Lillywhite signed with the San Francisco 49ers of the All-America Football Conference (AAFC) on April 15, 1948. He played in all 14 games, starting one, during the 1948 season, totaling 53 carries for 340 yards and three touchdowns, three interceptions, and three punts for 76 yards. He appeared in all 12 games, starting three, in 1949, recording 69 rushes for 263 yards and two touchdowns, eight receptions for 82 yards and two touchdowns, one interception, and four punts for 202 yards. He also played in one playoff game that year, rushing five times for 41 yards and one touchdown while also punting once for 45 yards. The AAFC folded after the 1949 season and the 49ers joined the NFL. Lillywhite played in nine games for San Francisco in 1950, totaling 26 punts for 1,016 yards, one interception, seven carries for four yards, and one catch for six yards. He started all 12 games for the 49ers in 1951, accumulating 67 rushing attempts for 397 yards and one touchdown, 11 receptions for 125 yards and one touchdown, three interceptions, and 20 punts for 847 yards. The 49ers finished the 1951 season with a 7–4–1 record.

== Personal life ==
Lillywhite served in the United States Navy during the Korean War. He was honorably discharged in 1960. He graduated from Los Angeles State College of Applied Arts and Sciences with a Master of Arts degree. Lillywhite was a teacher and coach at Mt. San Antonio College. In 1970, he began a 21-year tenure at Sherman E. Burroughs High School in Ridgecrest, California. He spent time as a teacher, coach and athletic director at Burroughs High before retiring in 1991.

Lillywhite died on July 14, 2007, in Mesa, Arizona.
