= Don Burke (American football) =

American football player (1926–2009)

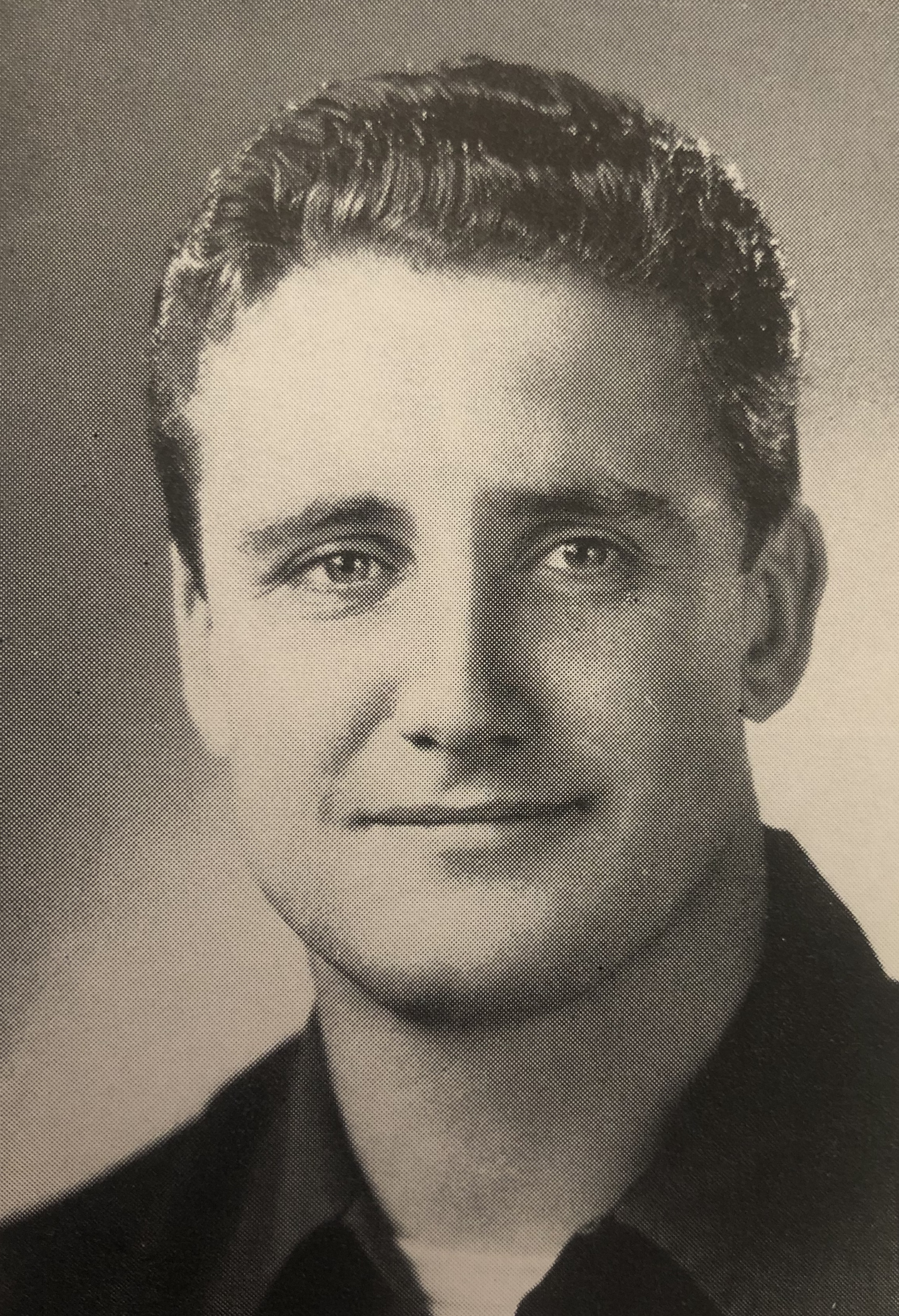
- Burke at USC c. 1949

No. 6, 32, 66
- Positions: Linebacker, guard

Personal information
- Born: February 7, 1926; Chico, California, U.S.
- Died: August 10, 2009 (aged 83); Reno, Nevada, U.S.
- Listed height: 6 ft 0 in (1.83 m)
- Listed weight: 235 lb (107 kg)

Career information
- High school: Oakland (Oakland, California)
- College: USC
- NFL draft: 1950: 12th round, 153rd overall pick

Career history
- San Francisco 49ers (1950–1954)

Career NFL statistics
- Games played: 39
- Games started: 27
- Fumble recoveries: 2
- Stats at Pro Football Reference

Donald Vincent Burke (February 7, 1926 – August 10, 2009) was an American professional football linebacker who played in the National Football League (NFL) for the San Francisco 49ers from 1950 to 1954 for a total of 39 games. He played college football as a fullback at USC.
