= Paul Crowe =

American football player (1924–1989)

- Paul Crowe in 1949

No. 92, 83, 3
- Positions: Halfback defensive back

Personal information
- Born: October 23, 1924; Chino, California
- Died: December 13, 1989 (aged 65); Butte County, California
- Listed height: 6 ft 1 in (1.85 m)
- Listed weight: 190 lb (86 kg)

Career information
- High school: Chino (CA)
- College: Saint Mary's

Career history
- San Francisco 49ers (1948-1949); Los Angeles Dons (1949); New York Yanks (1951)

Career statistics
- Games played: 32
- Starts: 1
- Stats at Pro Football Reference

Paul James Crowe (October 23, 1924 – December 13, 1989) was an American football player who played at the halfback and defensive back positions. He played college football for Saint Mary's military football for the 1944 Saint Mary's Pre-Flight Air Devils football team, and professional football for the San Francisco 49ers, Los Angeles Dons, and New York Yanks.

== Biography ==
=== Early life ===
Crowe was born in 1924 in Chino, California. He attended and played football at Chino High School. He starred in football, basketball, and track from 1939 to 1942.

=== Military and college football ===
Crowe served in the United States Army beginning in 1942. After the war, he played college football for the Saint Mary's Gaels from 1945 to 1947. He also played for the Saint Mary's basketball team.

=== Professional football ===
Crowe played professional football in the All-America Football Conference for the San Francisco 49ers during their 1948 season and for the 49ers and Los Angeles Dons during their 1949 seasons. He also played in the National Football League (NFL) for the 1951 New York Yanks. He appeared in a total of 32 AAFC and NFL games.

=== Family and later years ===
After retiring from football, Crowe became a general contractor. He also served on the Feather River Recreation and Park District Board of Directors.

Crowe died in 1989 at age 65 in Butte County, California.
