= Jim Cason =

American football player (1927–2013)

- Cason in 1949

No. 93, 43, 89, 41
- Positions: Safety, halfback

Personal information
- Born: July 25, 1927; Sondheimer, Louisiana, U.S.
- Died: November 24, 2013 (aged 86); Harlingen, Texas, U.S.
- Listed height: 6 ft 0 in (1.83 m)
- Listed weight: 171 lb (78 kg)

Career information
- High school: Patti Welder (Victoria, Texas)
- College: LSU (1944-1947)
- NFL draft: 1948: 7th round, 55th overall pick

Career history

Playing
- San Francisco 49ers (1948–1953); Saskatchewan Roughriders (1953); San Francisco 49ers (1954); Los Angeles Rams (1955–1956)

Coaching
- Denver Broncos (1960) Backfield coach

Awards and highlights
- 2× Pro Bowl (1951, 1954); AAFC interceptions leader (1949); AAFC punt return yards leader (1949)

Career AAFC/NFL statistics
- Interceptions: 34
- Interception yards: 475
- Fumble recoveries: 5
- Defensive touchdowns: 2
- Stats at Pro Football Reference

James Allnut Cason Jr. (July 25, 1927 – November 24, 2013) was an American professional football safety and halfback who played eight seasons in the All-America Football Conference (AAFC) and the National Football League (NFL), mainly for the San Francisco 49ers. He was selected for two Pro Bowls. He also started one game at quarterback in 1954 after Y. A. Tittle broke his left hand. However, Cason was relieved by Tittle in the fourth quarter of the game.

He was the backfield coach for the American Football League's (AFL) Denver Broncos in the team's inaugural season in 1960.

He died November 24, 2013, in Harlingen, Texas.
