= Frankie Albert =

American gridiron player and coach (1920–2002)

- Albert in 1949

No. 63, 13
- Positions: Quarterback, punter

Personal information
- Born: January 27, 1920; Chicago, Illinois, U.S.
- Died: September 4, 2002 (aged 82); Palo Alto, California, U.S.
- Listed height: 5 ft 10 in (1.78 m)
- Listed weight: 166 lb (75 kg)

Career information
- High school: Glendale (Glendale, California)
- College: Stanford (1939–1941)
- NFL draft: 1942: 1st round, 10th overall pick

Career history

Playing
- Los Angeles Bulldogs (1945); San Francisco 49ers (1946–1952); Calgary Stampeders (1953)

Coaching
- San Francisco 49ers (1955) Backfield coach; San Francisco 49ers (1956–1958) Head coach

Awards and highlights
- As a player: AAFC Most Valuable Player (1948); 3× Second-team All-Pro (1946, 1947, 1949) (Note: During the AAFC era, various outlets designated players as a First- or Second-team All-Pro, with Albert being designated an All-Pro by: the league itself (1946, 1948, 1949) and newspapers such as the AP (1946, 1947, 1949), the NYD (1946, 1948, 1949), the UP (1946, 1948, 1949), and SN (1948). Albert was named a first-team All Pro by the Daily News in 1946 and 1948 but named a second-team All-Pro by every other outlet in various years.); Pro Bowl (1950); 2× AAFC passing touchdowns leader (1948, 1949); AAFC completion percentage leader (1948); AAFC passer rating leader (1948); 2× Consensus All-American (1940, 1941); 2× First-team All-PCC (1940, 1941); AAFC record: Most passing touchdowns in a season: 29 (1948)

Career AAFC/NFL statistics
- TD–INT: 115–98
- Passing yards: 10,795
- Completion percentage: 53.1%
- Passer rating: 73.5
- Rushing yards: 1,272
- Rushing touchdowns: 27
- Punting yards: 12,866
- Punting average: 43
- Stats at Pro Football Reference

Head coaching record
- Regular season: 19–16–1 (.542)
- Postseason: 0–1 (.000)
- Career: 19–17–1 (.527)
- Coaching profile at Pro Football Reference
- College Football Hall of Fame

Frank Cullen Albert (January 27, 1920 – September 4, 2002) was an American professional football player and coach. He played as a quarterback and punter with the San Francisco 49ers in the All-America Football Conference (AAFC) and later in National Football League (NFL). He played college football for the Stanford Indians (now Cardinal), where he led the 1940 football team to an undefeated season and the 1941 Rose Bowl.

Many who saw Albert in action credit him as being the greatest left-handed quarterback ever to play the game. Albert was the first left-handed quarterback to play in the NFL.

== Biography ==
=== Early life ===
Frankie Albert was born in Chicago and attended Glendale High School in Glendale, California.

=== College career ===
He went to Stanford University, where he was coached by T formation innovator Clark Shaughnessy. Albert played as Stanford's quarterback and in 1940–41 became an all-American. He was the first college T-formation quarterback in modern football history. He led the team of 1940 to a 9–0 regular season, 21–13 victory over Nebraska in the Rose Bowl and a No. 2 national ranking, behind Minnesota. He was also a member of Stanford's chapter of the Delta Kappa Epsilon fraternity.

=== World War II ===
With the outbreak of World War II, Albert, as with most young American men of his generation, went before the Army for military draft classification. In December 1941, he was designated 1-B due to his having flat feet.

Wishing to aid the military effort and undeterred by his suboptimal categorization, amidst rumors that the Stanford University campus was to be converted into a training school for aviators, Albert applied to join US Navy Reserve as part of its announced physical training program for navy aviators. Albert's application was accepted, along with those of four other Stanford football teammates, and the group were slated to enter basic naval training at Norfolk Naval Air Station in Virginia in April. The physical training program in which they served was under the direction of lieutenant commander Gene Tunney, a former heavyweight boxing champion.

At the same time, the Chicago Bears selected Albert in the 1942 NFL draft with the 10th overall pick. He would never play with the team, serving instead in the Navy for four years.

=== Professional football career ===
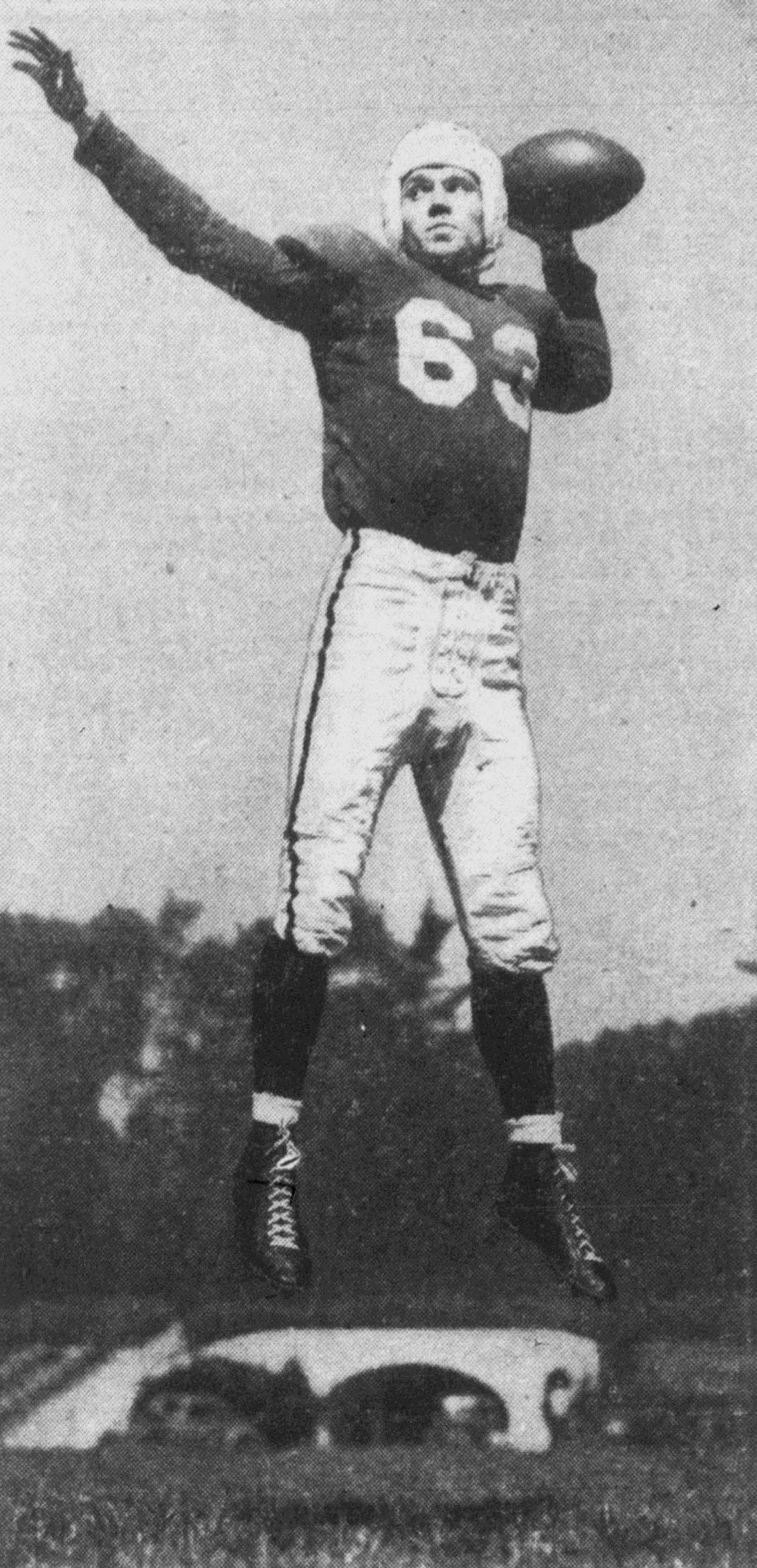
Frankie Albert circa 1947.

After quarterbacking the Los Angeles Bulldogs of the Pacific Coast Football League in 1945, he launched his All-Pro career with the San Francisco 49ers of the All-America Football Conference in 1946. He played seven seasons with the 49ers.

A founding member of the 49ers, Albert was also the highest-paid member of the team, with a contract paying him $10,000 for the 1946 season.

Albert, a 5-foot-9-inch (1.75 m), 166-pound, left-handed passer, was credited for inventing the bootleg play, in which the quarterback fakes a handoff then runs wide with the ball hidden on his hip. In 1948, he had the record for most passing touchdowns in a season in the league's history, and was named AAFC co-Most Valuable Player with Otto Graham. He played his last two seasons competing with Y. A. Tittle.

In 1950, Albert was named to the Pro Bowl when the 49ers joined the National Football League. He had 14 touchdown passes that year, and with his twelfth, he became the third quarterback in NFL history (after Sammy Baugh and Sid Luckman) with 100 career touchdown passes, which was the highmark for the position at the time (Otto Graham joined the 100 mark to end the season as well). He retired after the season of 1952. In seven pro seasons, Albert threw for 10,795 yards and 115 touchdowns.

After retiring from playing in the NFL, Albert played one final season with the Calgary Stampeders of the Western Interprovincial Football Union (WIFU), before retiring from playing football for good.

=== Coaching career ===
Albert as new coach of the 49ers, 1956.

After his retirement, the 49ers hired him as a scout and coach. He was named head coach in 1956 by owner Tony Morabito.

In his second year, Albert led the 49ers to their first winning record since 1954. They won five of their six games before a three-game losing streak had them at 5–4. They won the final three games to finish 8–4. They finished in a tie for first in the Western Conference with the Detroit Lions, with both teams winning against the other at home. As such, they had to play a one-game playoff to determine who would play in the NFL Championship Game, with this being their first playoff game since 1949.

On December 22, they played the Lions at Kezar Stadium. Facing backup Tobin Rote (subbing in for Bobby Layne, hurt two weeks earlier), the 49ers led 24–7 at halftime on the strength of three touchdown passes from Y. A. Tittle. They led by twenty after a field goal in the third quarter, but Detroit roared back in a monumental comeback, scoring 24 unanswered points to win 31–27.

Albert led the team to a 6–6 record the following year before he was replaced by Red Hickey; the 49ers would not threaten for a playoff spot until 1970. He coached the 49ers for three seasons, compiling a 19–16–1 record.

The Professional Football Researchers Association named Albert to the PFRA Hall of Very Good Class of 2007.

== Personal life ==
After his retirement from both playing and coaching football, Albert got into the real estate business.

Albert married his high school sweetheart, Martha Barringer, in 1942, and remained married to her for 60 years until his death. They had three daughters together: Nancy, Jane, and Terry. Jane would become a well-known tennis player whose accomplishments led her to become the first woman inducted into the Stanford Athletics Hall of Fame.

Albert died on September 4, 2002, due to complications from Alzheimer's disease.

== Football career statistics ==
=== AAFC/NFL ===
==== Regular season ====
Year	Team	Games			Passing									Rushing					Sacked		Punting			
Year	Team	GP	GS	Record	Cmp	Att	Pct	Yds	Y/A	Lng	TD	Int	Rtg	Att	Yds	Y/A	Lng	TD	Sck	SckY	Pnt	Yds	Avg	Lng
1946	SF	14	11	—	104	197	52.8	1,404	7.1	54	14	14	69.8	69	-10	-0.1	—	4	—	—	54	2,214	41.0	—
1947	SF	14	9	—	128	242	52.9	1,692	7.0	60	18	15	74.3	46	179	3.9	—	5	13	119	40	1,759	44.0	—
1948	SF	14	9	—	154	264	58.3	1,990	7.5	59	29	10	102.9	69	349	5.1	—	8	16	165	35	1,568	44.8	—
1949	SF	12	9	—	129	260	49.6	1,862	7.2	75	27	16	82.2	35	249	7.1	—	3	14	153	31	1,495	48.2	—
1950	SF	12	12	3–9	155	306	50.7	1,767	5.8	43	14	23	52.3	53	272	5.1	42	3	—	311	37	1,424	38.5	64
1951	SF	12	11	6–4–1	90	166	54.2	1,116	6.7	47	5	10	60.2	35	146	4.2	34	3	—	171	34	1,507	44.3	66
1952	SF	12	7	4–3	71	129	55.0	964	7.5	60	8	10	67.5	22	87	4.0	29	1	—	177	68	2,899	42.6	70
Career		90	68	13–16–1	831	1,564	53.1	10,795	6.9	75	115	98	73.5	329	1,272	3.9	42	27	43	1,096	299	12,866	43.0	70

==== Postseason ====
Year	Team	Games			Passing									Rushing					Sacked		Punting			
Year	Team	GP	GS	Record	Cmp	Att	Pct	Yds	Y/A	Lng	TD	Int	Rtg	Att	Yds	Y/A	Lng	TD	Sck	SckY	Pnt	Yds	Avg	Lng
1949	SF	2	2	1–1	17	41	41.5	204	5.0	30	2	2	53.3	14	92	6.6	—	0	4	39	14	639	45.6	—
Career		2	2	1–1	17	41	41.5	204	5.0	30	2	2	53.3	14	92	6.6	N/A	0	4	39	14	639	45.6	N/A

=== WIFU ===
Year	Team	Games			Passing									Rushing					Sacked		Punting			
Year	Team	GP	GS	Record	Cmp	Att	Pct	Yds	Y/A	Lng	TD	Int	Rtg	Att	Yds	Y/A	Lng	TD	Sck	SckY	Pnt	Yds	Avg	Lng
1953	CAL	—	—	3–12–1	104	225	48.2	1,562	—	—	12	16	—	53	-25	-0.5	—	2	—	—	48	1,926	40.1	—
Career		—	—	3–12–1	104	225	48.2	1,562	—	—	12	16	—	53	-25	-0.5	—	2	—	—	48	1,926	40.1	—

== Head coaching record ==
Team	Year	Regular season					Postseason			
Team	Year	Won	Lost	Ties	Win %	Finish	Won	Lost	Win %	Result
SF	1956	5	6	1	.458	3rd in NFL Western	—	—	—	—
SF	1957	8	4	0	.667	T–1st in NFL Western	0	1	.000	Lost to the Detroit Lions in conference playoff game.
SF	1958	6	6	0	.500	4th in NFL Western	—	—	—	—
Total		19	16	1	.542					

Preceded by First	NFL on NBC lead analyst 1960–1961	Succeeded by Paul Christman
