= List of All-America Football Conference players =

This is a list of players who appeared in at least one regular season or postseason game in the All-America Football Conference (AAFC).

== A ==
- Tony Adamle
- Chet Adams
- O'Neal Adams
- Ben Agajanian
- Alex Agase
- Joe Aguirre
- Al Akins
- Frankie Albert
- Bruce Alford
- Carl Allen
- Ermal Allen
- Sugarfoot Anderson
- Charlie Armstrong
- Graham Armstrong
- Lee Artoe
- Frank Aschenbrenner
- Earl Audet
- Don Avery

== B ==
- Ed Balatti
- Al Baldwin
- Burr Baldwin
- Jack Baldwin
- Bruno Banducci
- Dick Barwegan
- Bill Bass
- Dick Bassi
- John Batorski
- Alf Bauman
- Bill Baumgartner
- Alyn Beals
- Hub Bechtol
- Ed Bell
- George Benson
- Roman Bentz
- Paul Berezney
- Pete Berezney
- George Bernhardt
- Connie Mack Berry
- Angelo Bertelli
- Warren Beson
- John Billman
- J. T. "Blondy" Black
- Ernie Blandin
- Lamar Blount
- Bill Boedeker
- George Brown
- Hardy Brown
- John Brown
- Gail Bruce
- Jim Brutz
- Bob Bryant
- Harry Buffington
- George Buksar
- Rex Bumgardner
- Harry Burrus
- Carl Butkus

== C ==
- Bob Callahan
- Tony Calvelli
- Jim Camp
- Jack Carpenter
- Eddie Carr
- Ken Casanega
- Ernie Case
- Jim Cason
- Jim Castiglia
- Sam Cathcart
- Daryl Cato
- Bill Chambers
- Bob Chappuis
- Lloyd Cheatham
- George Cheroke
- Don Clark
- Harry Clarke
- Walt Clay
- Paul Cleary
- Johnny Clement
- Ollie Cline
- Johnny Clowes
- Tommy Colella
- Herb Coleman
- Floyd Collier
- Rip Collins
- Mickey Colmer
- Marty Comer
- Gerry Conlee
- Harry Connolly
- Ken Cooper
- Al Coppage
- Bert Corley
- Bob Cowan
- Jim Cox
- Norm Cox
- Denny Crawford
- Paul Crowe
- Armand Cure
- Ziggy Czarobski

== D ==
- Bill Daddio
- Bill Daley
- Dick Danehe
- Jim Daniell
- Lou Daukas
- Nick Daukas
- Bob David
- Bill Davis
- Harper Davis
- Joe Davis
- Lamar Davis
- Van Davis
- Al Dekdebrun
- Spiro Dellerba
- Jim Dewar
- Glenn Dobbs
- Bob Dobelstein
- George Doherty
- John Donaldson
- Noble Doss
- Bob Dove
- Andy Dudish
- Gil Duggan
- Jack Dugger
- Paul Duke
- Don Durdan
- Jeff Durkota
- Dan Dworsky

== E ==
- Kay Eakin
- Ray Ebli
- Ed Ecker
- Brad Ecklund
- Dan Edwards
- Gene Ellenson
- Charlie Elliott
- Dutch Elston
- Dick Erdlitz
- Len Eshmont
- Fred Evans
- Ray Evans

== F ==
- Tom Farris
- Gene Fekete
- Chuck Fenenbock
- Bill Fisk
- Jack Flagerman
- Oliver Fletcher
- Hank Foldberg
- Len Ford
- Nick Forkovitch
- Eddie Forrest
- Aubrey Fowler
- Terry Fox
- Pete Franceschi
- Ray Frankowski
- Jack Freeman
- Jesse Freitas
- Barry French

== G ==
- Monk Gafford
- John Galvin
- Lu Gambino
- Don Garlin
- Dub Garrett
- Dan Garza
- Mike Garzoni
- Frank Gatski
- Bob Gaudio
- Dale Gentry
- Gorham Getchell
- Abe Gibron
- Joe Gibson
- Paul Gibson
- Horace Gillom
- Fred Gloden
- Bill Gompers
- Mike Graham
- Otto Graham
- Ed Grain
- Nelson Greene
- Don Greenwood
- Garland Gregory
- Don Griffin
- Billy Grimes
- Visco Grgich
- Chubby Grigg
- Rex Grossman
- George Groves
- Lou Groza
- Ed Gustafson

== H ==
- Forrest Hall
- Parker Hall
- Dick Handley
- Ray Hare
- John Harrington
- Amos Harris
- Elmore Harris
- Ted Hazelwood
- Walt Heap
- George Hecht
- George Hekkers
- Ed Henke
- Hal Herring
- Ralph Heywood
- Luke Higgins
- Billy Hillenbrand
- Buckets Hirsch
- Elroy Hirsch
- Homer Hobbs
- Robert Hoernschemeyer
- Bob Hoffman
- Lew Holder
- Ken Holley
- Harry Hopp
- Dick Horne
- Les Horvath
- Lin Houston
- Sherman Howard
- Clarence Howell
- Frank Hrabetin
- Weldon Humble
- Charlie Huneke

== I ==
- Duke Iversen

== J ==
- Chick Jagade
- Tommy James
- Ed Jeffers
- Jon Jenkins
- Bob Jensen
- Bill Johnson
- Clyde Johnson
- Farnham Johnson
- Gil Johnson
- Glenn Johnson
- Harvey Johnson
- Nate Johnson
- Pres Johnston
- Dub Jones
- Edgar Jones
- Elmer Jones
- Ralph Jones
- Saxon Judd
- Buddy Jungmichel
- Steve Juzwik

== K ==
- Alex Kapter
- Mike Karmazin
- Mike Kasap
- Bill Kellagher
- Ed Kelley
- Bob Kelly
- Bob Kennedy (born 1921)
- Bob Kennedy (born 1928)
- John Kerns
- Bill Kerr
- John Kimbrough
- Bruiser Kinard
- George Kinard
- Ed King
- Fay King
- Wayne Kingery
- George Kisiday
- John Kissell
- Veto Kissell
- Quentin Klenk
- Al Klug
- Nick Klutka
- George Koch
- Joe Kodba
- Robert Kolesar
- Floyd Konetsky
- Frank Kosikowski
- Chet Kozel
- Stan Kozlowski
- Jack Kramer
- Joe Krivonak
- Al Krueger
- Ray Kuffel
- Vic Kulbitski
- Roy Kurrasch
- Lou Kusserow
- John Kuzman

== L ==
- Hal Lahar
- Pat Lahey
- Warren Lahr
- Pete Lamana
- Fred Land
- Jim Landrigan
- Tom Landry
- Mort Landsberg
- Dante Lavelli
- Pete Layden
- Jim Lecture
- Jake Leicht
- Reid Lennan
- Bill Leonard
- Bob Leonetti
- Len Levy
- Cliff Lewis
- Ernie Lewis
- Verl Lillywhite
- Augie Lio
- Bob Livingstone
- Al Lolotai
- Bill Lund

== M ==
- Herb Maack
- Mel Maceau
- Elmer Madar
- Chick Maggioli
- Joe Magliolo
- Ned Maloney
- Pug Manders
- Hugo Marcolini
- Andy Marefos
- Vic Marino
- Patsy Martinelli
- Phil Martinovich
- Len Masini
- John Maskas
- Bob Masterson
- John Mastrangelo
- Riley Matheson
- Ned Mathews
- Lew Mayne
- Vince Mazza
- Jim McCarthy
- Harley McCollum
- Len McCormick
- Walter McCormick
- Flip McDonald
- Walt McDonald
- Shorty McWilliams
- Jim Mello
- John Mellus
- Bus Mertes
- Ed Mieszkowski
- Lou Mihajlovich
- Joe Mihal
- Bob Mike
- Tom Mikula
- Bob Mitchell
- Fondren Mitchell
- Paul Mitchell
- Rudy Mobley
- Max Morris
- Bob Morrow
- Russ Morrow
- Jack Morton
- Bob Motl
- Marion Motley
- Jerry Mulready
- Chet Mutryn

== N ==
- Roland Nabors
- Johnny Naumu
- Fred Negus
- Herb Nelson
- Jimmy Nelson
- Robert Nelson
- Steve Nemeth
- Bruno Niedziela
- Don Nolander
- Hank Norberg
- John North
- Bob Nowaskey

== O ==
- Vic Obeck
- Bill O'Connor
- Mitch Olenski
- Bob Oristaglio
- Charlie O'Rourke
- Ted Ossowski
- Dick Ottele
- Ike Owens

== P ==
- Bob Paffrath
- Paul Page
- Homer Paine
- Derrell Palmer
- Don Panciera
- Ace Parker
- Howie Parker
- Mickey Parks
- Ara Parseghian
- Earle Parsons
- Paul Patterson
- Jim Pearcy
- Frank Perantoni
- Bolo Perdue
- Bob Perina
- John Perko
- George Perpich
- Mike Perrotti
- Joe Perry
- Bob Pfohl
- Bert Piggott
- Joyce Pipkin
- Rocco Pirro
- Roman Piskor
- John Polanski
- Hamp Pool
- Barney Poole
- Ollie Poole
- Felto Prewitt
- Cotton Price
- Dom Principe
- Dewey Proctor
- Eddie Prokop
- Joe Prokop
- Ben Pucci
- Hal Puddy
- Marion Pugh
- Cal Purdin

== Q ==
- Frank Quillen

== R ==
- Bill Radovich
- Ben Raimondi
- Knox Ramsey
- Ray Ramsey
- John Rapacz
- George Ratterman
- Don Reece
- Bill Reinhard
- Bob Reinhard
- Albie Reisz
- Jim Reynolds
- Charley Riffle
- Tom Robertson
- Ed Robnett
- Hank Rockwell
- Hosea Rodgers
- John Rokisky
- Ken Roskie
- Harmon Rowe
- Martin Ruby
- Joe Ruetz
- Jack Russell
- Ralph Ruthstrom
- Jules Rykovich
- Lou Rymkus

== S ==
- Lou Saban
- Paul Salata
- Spec Sanders
- Curt Sandig
- Al Satterfield
- Ralph Sazio
- Ted Scalissi
- Mike Scarry
- John Schiechl
- Ralph Schilling
- Don Schneider
- Otto Schnellbacher
- Bill Schroeder
- Bill Schroll
- Carl Schuette
- Perry Schwartz
- Bud Schwenk
- Prince Scott
- Vince Scott
- Ted Scruggs
- Dean Sensanbaugher
- George Sergienko
- Lin Sexton
- Bob Seymour
- Ed Sharkey
- Rhoten Shetley
- Marion Shirley
- Hal Shoener
- Marshall Shurnas
- Alex Sidorik
- Stephen Sieradzki
- Joe Signaigo
- Sig Sigurdson
- Floyd Simmons
- Jack Simmons
- Lenny Simonetti
- Frankie Sinkwich
- Jim Sivell
- George Smith
- Bill Smith
- Bob Smith
- Gaylon Smith
- Bob Sneddon
- Joe Soboleski
- Lou Sossamon
- Jim Spavital
- Mac Speedie
- Joe Spencer
- Jim Spruill
- Norm Standlee
- C.B. Stanley
- Bill Stanton
- Stan Stasica
- Art Statuto
- Odell Stautzenberger
- Bob Stefik
- Bob Steuber
- Ralph Stewart
- Jim Still
- Herb St. John
- Ken Stofer
- Billy Stone
- George Strohmeyer
- Johnny Strzykalski
- Roy Stuart
- Bob Sullivan
- Tony Sumpter
- Nick Susoeff
- Ed Sustersic
- Joe Sutton
- Bob Sweiger

== T ==
- Doyle Tackett
- George Taliaferro
- Jimmy Tarrant
- John Tavener
- Chuck Taylor
- George Terlep
- Ray Terrell
- Lee Tevis
- Lowell Tew
- Hal Thompson
- Tommy Thompson
- Bob Thurbon
- Pete Tillman
- Charlie Timmons
- Buddy Tinsley
- Bob Titchenal
- Y. A. Tittle
- Lou Tomasetti
- Buzz Trebotich
- Frank Trigilio

== U ==
- Ed Ulinski
- Hub Ulrich
- Gasper Urban
- Emil Uremovich

== V ==
- Sam Vacanti
- Al Vandeweghe
- Art Van Tone
- Johnny Vardian
- Vic Vasicek
- Norm Verry
- Joe Vetrano
- Evan Vogds
- Wilbur Volz

== W ==
- Lowell Wagner
- Bev Wallace
- Tex Warrington
- Lloyd Wasserbach
- Herman Wedemeyer
- Arnie Weinmeister
- Marty Wendell
- Harlan Wetz
- Jerry Whalen
- Ben Whaley
- Ken Whitlow
- Willie Wilkin
- Dick Wilkins
- Garland Williams
- Joel Williams
- Windell Williams
- Ernie Williamson
- Bill Willis
- Abner Wimberly
- Bernie Winkler
- Pete Wismann
- Alex Wizbicki
- Dick Woodard
- John Woudenberg
- John Wozniak
- Al Wukits
- John Wyhonic

== Y ==
- Joe Yackanich
- Frank Yokas
- John Yonakor
- Wally Yonamine
- Buddy Young
- George Young

== Z ==
- Lou Zontini
- George Zorich
