= 1946 Brooklyn Dodgers (AAFC) season =

American football team season

1946 Brooklyn Dodgers season
- Head coach: Mal Stevens, Tom Scott (interim), Cliff Battles
- Home stadium: Ebbets Field

Results
- Record: 3–10–1
- Division place: T-2nd AAFC East
- Playoffs: did not qualify

The 1946 Brooklyn Dodgers season was the first season for the Brooklyn Dodgers football team and also the inaugural season of the All-America Football Conference. The team compiled a 3–10–1 record.

In October 1945, team co-owners William D. Cox and Gerald Smith announced that the new Brooklyn football team would play its home games at Ebbets Field and that they had signed Mal Stevens as head coach and Glenn Dobbs and Bill Daley to play in the backfield.

Stevens resigned as the Dodgers head coach in October 1946 after the team posted a 1–4–1 record in its first six games. Assistant coach Tom Scott took over on an interim basis after Stevens' resignation. Cliff Battles was hired as the new head coach on November 1, 1946.

The team's statistical leaders included halfback Glenn Dobbs with 1,886 passing yards, 208 rushing yards, and end Saxon Judd with 443 receiving yards. Dobbs and guard/fullback Phil Martinovich tied for the team scoring lead with 36 points each. Dobbs' total of 1,886 passing yards also led the AAFC.

== Schedule ==
Week	Date	Opponent	Result	Record	Venue	Recap
1	September 8	at **Buffalo Bisons**	**W** 27–14	1–0	Civic Stadium	Recap
2	September 13	at Los Angeles Dons	**L** 14–20	1–1	Los Angeles Memorial Coliseum	Recap
3	September 22	at San Francisco 49ers	**L** 13–32	1–2	Kezar Stadium	Recap
4	Bye					
5	October 6	at Cleveland Browns	**L** 7–26	1–3	Cleveland Municipal Stadium	Recap
6	October 11	Chicago Rockets	**T** 21–21	1–3–1	Ebbets Field	Recap
7	October 19	at **New York Yankees**	**L** 10–21	1–4–1	Yankee Stadium	Recap
8	October 25	**Miami Seahawks**	**W** 30–7	2–4–1	Ebbets Field	Recap
9	November 2	at Chicago Rockets	**W** 21–14	3–4–1	Soldier Field	Recap
10	November 10	**Buffalo Bisons**	**L** 14–17	3–5–1	Ebbets Field	Recap
11	November 17	Los Angeles Dons	**L** 14–19	3–6–1	Ebbets Field	Recap
12	November 24	San Francisco 49ers	**L** 14–30	3–7–1	Ebbets Field	Recap
13	November 28	**New York Yankees**	**L** 7–21	3–8–1	Ebbets Field	Recap
14	December 8	Cleveland Browns	**L** 14–66	3–9–1	Ebbets Field	Recap
15	December 13	**Miami Seahawks**	**L** 20–31	3–10–1	Miami Orange Bowl	Recap
Note: Intra-division opponents are in **bold** text.

== Division standings ==
AAFC Eastern Division
	W	L	T	PCT	DIV	PF	PA	STK
New York Yankees	10	3	1	.769	6–0	270	192	W2
Buffalo Bisons	3	10	1	.231	1–5	249	370	L3
Brooklyn Dodgers	3	10	1	.231	2–4	226	339	L6
Miami Seahawks	3	11	0	.214	3–3	167	378	W1

Note: Tie games were not officially counted in the standings.

== Roster ==
1946 Brooklyn Dodgers final roster
Backs: 72 Charlie Armstrong RB/CB; 81 Mickey Colmer CB/RB; 93 Harry Connolly RB/S; 90 Glenn Dobbs RB/S/P; 71 Monk Gafford CB/RB; 73 Dub Jones FB/LB; 60 Lew Mayne CB/RB; 61 Walt MacDonald LB/FB; 94 Dom Principe FB; 83 Rhoten Shetley FB/LB; 80 Doyle Tackett S/RB; 91 Charlie Timmons RB; 92 Art Van Tone CB/RB; Ends/Receivers: 54 O'Neal Adams; 55 Joe Davis; 53 Saxon Judd; 51 Bob McCain; 51 Jim McCarthy K; rookies in italics	Linemen/Linebackers: 31 George Bernhardt MG/G; 33 Harry Buffington G/LB; 42 Nick Daukas T/DT; 34 Jack Freeman LB/G; 22 Joe Gibson LB/C; 41 Ed Mieszkowski T/DT; 21 Russ Morrow C/LB; 35 Vic Obeck G; 40 George Perpich T; 43 Martin Ruby T/DT; 30 George Sergienko T/G; 20 Tex Warrington C/LB; Special teams: 45 Phil Martinovich K
