= 1947 Brooklyn Dodgers (AAFC) season =

American football team season

1947 Brooklyn Dodgers season
- Head coach: Cliff Battles
- Home stadium: Ebbets Field

Results
- Record: 3–10–1
- Division place: 3rd AAFC East
- Playoffs: did not qualify

The 1947 Brooklyn Dodgers season was their second in the All-America Football Conference. The team matched their previous output of 3-10-1. They failed to qualify for the playoffs for the second consecutive season.

The team's statistical leaders included Bob Hoernschemeyer with 783 passing yards and 702 rushing yards, Saxon Judd with 204 receiving yards, and Mickey Colmer with 60 points scored.

== Season schedule ==
Game	Date	Opponent	Result	Record	Venue	Attendance	Recap	Sources
1	August 31	at San Francisco 49ers	**L** 7–23	0–1	Kezar Stadium	31,874	Recap	
2	September 7	at **Baltimore Colts**	**L** 7–16	0–2	Municipal Stadium	27,418	Recap	
3	September 12	Cleveland Browns	**L** 7–55	0–3	Ebbets Field	18,876	Recap	
4	September 19	at Los Angeles Dons	**L** 21–48	0–4	L.A. Memorial Coliseum	38,817	Recap	
—	Bye							
5	October 3	at Chicago Rockets	**W** 35–31	1–4	Soldier Field	16,844	Recap	
6	October 12	at **New York Yankees**	**L** 7–31	1–5	Yankee Stadium	21,882	Recap	
7	October 17	**Buffalo Bills**	**T** 14–14	1–5–1	Ebbets Field	9,792	Recap	
8	October 26	at **Buffalo Bills**	**L** 7–35	1–6–1	Civic Stadium	23,762	Recap	
9	October 31	Chicago Rockets	**W** 7–3	2–6–1	Ebbets Field	2,960	Recap	
10	November 9	at Cleveland Browns	**L** 12–13	2–7–1	Cleveland Municipal Stadium	30,279	Recap	
11	November 16	**Baltimore Colts**	**W** 21–14	2–8–1	Ebbets Field	9,604	Recap	
12	November 23	Los Angeles Dons	**L** 12–16	2–9–1	Ebbets Field	11,866	Recap	
13	November 27	San Francisco 49ers	**L** 7–21	2–10–1	Ebbets Field	9,837	Recap	
14	December 7	**New York Yankees**	**L** 17–20	2–11–1	Ebbets Field	14,166	Recap	
Note: Intra-division opponents are in **bold** text.

== Division standings ==
AAFC Eastern Division
	W	L	T	PCT	DIV	PF	PA	STK
New York Yankees	11	2	1	.846	5–1	378	239	W2
Buffalo Bills	8	4	2	.667	4–1–1	320	288	T1
Brooklyn Dodgers	3	10	1	.231	1–4–1	181	340	L3
Baltimore Colts	2	11	1	.154	1–5	167	377	L1

Note: Tie games were not officially counted in the standings.

== Roster ==
1947 Brooklyn Dodgers final roster
Backs: 81 Al Akins S/RB; 72 Mickey Colmer FB/LB/P; 80 Monk Gafford CB/RB; 82 Elmore Harris RB; 90 Bob Hoernschemeyer RB/CB; 91 Dub Jones RB/S; 61 Walt MacDonald RB/S; 70 Bob Perina CB/RB/P; 62 Doyle Tackett RB/S; 92 Lee Tevis CB/RB/P; Ends/Receivers: 53 Saxon Judd; 51 Jim McCarthy; 52 Herb Nelson; 50 Ted Scruggs; 55 Hal Thompson; rookies in italics	Linemen/Linebackers: 31 George Bernhardt G/DG; 33 Harry Buffington G; 24 Lou Daukas C/LB; 40 Nick Daukas T; 21 Joe Gibson LB/C; 22 Ed Gustafson LB/C; 37 Amos Harris DG; 47 Charlie Huneke DT; 35 Ed Jeffers DG; 63 Al Kowalski LB; 41 Ed Mieszkowski T/DT; 43 Martin Ruby T/DT; 20 Tex Warrington G/DG; 48 Harlan Wetz T/DT; 44 Garland Williams T/DT; Special teams: 45 Phil Martinovich K
