= 1948 Brooklyn Dodgers (AAFC) season =

American football team season

1948 Brooklyn Dodgers season
- Head coach: Carl Voyles
- Home stadium: Ebbets Field

Results
- Record: 2–12
- Division place: 4th AAFC East
- Playoffs: did not qualify

The 1948 Brooklyn Dodgers season was their third in the All-America Football Conference. The team failed to improve on their previous output of 3-10-1, winning only two games. They failed to qualify for the playoffs for the third consecutive season and the team folded after the season.

The team's statistical leaders included Bob Chappuis with 1,402 passing yards and Mickey Colmer with 704 rushing yards, 372 receiving yards and 60 points scored.

== Season schedule ==
| Week | Date | Opponent | Result | Record | Venue | Recap |
|---|---|---|---|---|---|---|
| 1 | August 27 | **New York Yankees** | **L** 3–21 | 0–1 | Ebbets Field | Recap |
| 2 | September 5 | at San Francisco 49ers | **L** 20–36 | 0–2 | Kezar Stadium | Recap |
| 3 | September 10 | at Los Angeles Dons | **L** 7–17 | 0–3 | Los Angeles Memorial Coliseum | Recap |
| 4 | Bye | | | | | |
| 5 | September 26 | at **Baltimore Colts** | **L** 20–35 | 0–4 | Municipal Stadium | Recap |
| 6 | October 3 | at Buffalo Bills | **L** 21–31 | 0–5 | Civic Stadium | Recap |
| 7 | October 10 | at Cleveland Browns | **L** 17–30 | 0–6 | Cleveland Municipal Stadium | Recap |
| 8 | October 15 | Chicago Rockets | **W** 21–7 | 1–6 | Ebbets Field | Recap |
| 9 | October 24 | at Chicago Rockets | **W** 35–14 | 2–6 | Soldier Field | Recap |
| 10 | October 31 | Los Angeles Dons | **L** 0–17 | 2–7 | Ebbets Field | Recap |
| 11 | November 7 | Buffalo Bills | **L** 21–26 | 2–8 | Ebbets Field | Recap |
| 12 | November 14 | at **New York Yankees** | **L** 7–21 | 2–9 | Yankee Stadium | Recap |
| 13 | November 21 | San Francisco 49ers | **L** 40–63 | 2–10 | Ebbets Field | Recap |
| 14 | November 28 | **Baltimore Colts** | **L** 20–38 | 2–11 | Ebbets Field | Recap |
| 15 | December 5 | Cleveland Browns | **L** 21–31 | 2–12 | Ebbets Field | Recap |
Note: Intra-division opponents are in **bold** text.

== Division standings ==
AAFC Eastern Division
| | W | L | T | PCT | DIV | PF | PA | STK |
|---|---|---|---|---|---|---|---|---|
| Buffalo Bills | 7 | 7 | 0 | .500 | 4–2 | 360 | 358 | L1 |
| Baltimore Colts | 7 | 7 | 0 | .500 | 5–1 | 333 | 327 | W2 |
| New York Yankees | 6 | 8 | 0 | .429 | 3–3 | 265 | 301 | W1 |
| Brooklyn Dodgers | 2 | 12 | 0 | .143 | 0–6 | 253 | 387 | L6 |

Note: Tie games were not officially counted in the standings.

== Roster ==
1948 Brooklyn Dodgers final roster
| Running backs: 99 Bob Chappuis; 72 Mickey Colmer LB/P; 80 Monk Gafford CB; 90 Bob Hoernschemeyer CB; 63 Hardy Brown K/LB; 92 Lee Tevis K/CB; Ends/Receivers: 54 Harry Burrus; 51 Dan Edwards; 52 Hank Foldberg; 53 Saxon Judd; 56 Max Morris; 50 Ted Scruggs | Linemen/Linebackers: 33 Harry Buffington G/MG; 45 Johnny Clowes T; 22 Ed Gustafson C/LB; 37 Amos Harris LB/G; 31 Bob Leonetti G; 71 Hugo Marcolini LB/FB; 43 Martin Ruby DT/T; 48 Ralph Sazio T/DT; 42 Joe Spencer DT/T; 34 Herb St. John G; 25 George Strohmeyer LB/C; 30 Tex Warrington MG/G; 44 Garland Williams DT/T; 35 John Wozniak G/MG | Defensive backs: 93 Carl Allen CB; 84 Jim Camp CB/RB; 64 Nick Forkovitch S/RB; 61 Walt MacDonald S/RB; 91 Ray Ramsey S/RB; 62 Bob Smith CB/RB; rookies in italics |
