= Wayne Gift =

American football player and coach (1915–1998)

No. 3
- Position: Quarterback

Personal information
- Born: October 21, 1915; Medina, Ohio, U.S.
- Died: February 13, 1998 (aged 82); Louisville, Kentucky, U.S.
- Listed height: 5 ft 8 in (1.73 m)
- Listed weight: 175 lb (79 kg)

Career information
- High school: McKinley (Canton, Ohio)
- College: Purdue

Career history

Playing
- Cleveland Rams (1937)

Coaching
- Brooklyn Dodgers (1947) (assistant)
- Stats at Pro Football Reference

Leland Wayne Gift (October 21, 1915 – February 13, 1998) was an American professional football player who was a quarterback for one season with the Cleveland Rams of the National Football League (NFL). He played college football for the Purdue Boilermakers.

== Early life and college ==
Leland Wayne Gift was born on October 21, 1915, in Medina, Ohio. He attended Canton McKinley High School in Canton, Ohio.

Gift was a three-year letterman for the Boilermakers of Purdue University from 1934 to 1936. He spent time as the team's starting quarterback. He was a member of the Sigma Pi fraternity.

== Professional career ==
Gift played in ten games, starting one, for the Cleveland Rams of the National Football League during the team's inaugural 1937 season, totaling three carries for seven yards, three receptions for 20 yards, and three incomplete passes.

== Post-playing career ==
During World War II he served in the United States Navy. He was an assistant coach for the Brooklyn Dodgers of the All-America Football Conference during the 1947 season.

Gift died on February 13, 1998, in Louisville, Kentucky.
