= 1944 All-Southern Conference football team =

The 1944 All-Southern Conference football team consists of American football players chosen by coaches and sports writers on behalf of the Associated Press (AP) as the best at each position from the Southern Conference during the 1944 college football season.

== All-Southern Conference selections ==
=== Backs ===
- Elmer Barbour, Wake Forest (AP-1)
- Gordon Carver, Duke (AP-1)
- Tom Davis, Duke (AP-1)
- Howie Turner, NC State (AP-1)
- Tom Mikula, William & Mary (AP-2)
- Sid Tinsley, Clemson (AP-2)
- George Clark, Duke (AP-2)
- Rock Brinkley, Wake Forest (AP-2)

=== Ends ===
- Dave Harris, Wake Forest (AP-1)
- Pat Thrash, South Carolina (AP-1)
- Clarke Jones, Duke (AP-2)
- Paul Gibson, NC State (AP-2)

=== Tackles ===
- John Kerns, Wake Forest (AP-1)
- George Owen, Wake Forest (AP-1)
- Frank Irwin, Duke (AP-2)
- George McDonald, South Carolina (AP-2)

=== Guards ===
- Johnny Clowes, William & Mary (AP-1)
- Ernie Knotts, Duke (AP-1)
- Buck Garrison, Wake Forest (AP-2)
- Tom Salisbury, Clemson (AP-2)

=== Centers ===
- Ralph Jenkins, Clemson (AP-1)
- John Crowder, Duke (AP-2)

== Key ==
AP = Associated Press

== See also ==
- 1944 College Football All-America Team
