= Phil Martinovich =

American football player (1915–1964)

No. 50, 34, 51, 29, 19, 21, 6, 45
- Positions: Placekicker, back

Personal information
- Born: February 9, 1915; Diamond Springs, California, U.S.
- Died: September 22, 1964 (aged 49); West Sacramento, California, U.S.
- Listed height: 5 ft 10 in (1.78 m)
- Listed weight: 220 lb (100 kg)

Career information
- High school: El Dorado (Placentia, California)
- College: Pacific (1934–1937)
- NFL draft: 1938: undrafted

Career history
- Cincinnati Bengals (1938–1939); Detroit Lions (1939); Chicago Bears (1940); → Newark Bears (1940); New York Yankees (1941); Long Island Clippers (1942); Newark Bombers (1946); Brooklyn Dodgers (1946–1947)

Awards and highlights
- NFL champion (1940); NFL All-Star (1940)
- Stats at Pro Football Reference

Philip Joseph Martinovich (February 9, 1915 – September 22, 1964) was an American professional football placekicker who played in the National Football League (NFL) and All-America Football Conference (AAFC). He played college football at the University of the Pacific.

== Early life and college ==
Philip Joseph Martinovich was born on February 9, 1915, in Diamond Springs, California. He attended El Dorado High School in Placerville, California.

Martinovich was a member of the Pacific Tigers of the University of the Pacific from 1934 to 1937 and a three-year letterman from 1935 to 1937. He only missed one extra point during his entire three years as a letterman.

== Professional career ==
Martinovich went undrafted in the 1938 NFL draft. He then played in all ten games, starting nine, for the independent Cincinnati Bengals during the 1938 season and scored 57 totals points. In 1940, he appeared in four games, starting three, for the Bengals, who were now members of the American Professional Football Association. He converted four field goals and one of three extra points for the Bengals that year.

On October 27, 1939, Martinovich was signed by the Detroit Lions of the National Football League (NFL). On November 5, 1939, the Lions faced the New York Giants, who had gone 19 straight games without a loss. The Lions ended up winning 18–14. An excerpt from The Times Herald the next day noted that "Phil Martinovich is about the coolest player on the Lion squad. He appeared in the game Sunday for six plays taking about two minutes and all he did was boot the pigskin through the goal post uprights three times, good for nine points, kicked off twice (the second went between the uprights but was called back because of an offside penalty) and made one tackle." Overall, Martinovich played in four games for the Lions that year, converting three of six field goals.

Martinovich signed with the Chicago Bears of the NFL in 1940. He began the 1940 season playing for the Bears' farm team, the Newark Bears of the American Association. He appeared in seven games for Newark Bears that year, scoring four field goals and two of two extra points. He was later promoted to the big league Chicago Bears and played in two games during the 1940 NFL season, converting two of two field goals. Martinovich also appeared in the 1940 NFL Championship Game, missing one field goal and converting one of one extra points, as the Bears beat the Washington Redskins by a score of 73–0. On December 29, 1940, the NFL champion Bears played a team of NFL All-Stars in the 1940 NFL All-Star Game. Martinovich kicked an extra point during the game.

Martinovich played for the New York Yankees of the American Football League in 1941, making nine field goals and eight extra points. He then played for the independent Long Island Clippers in 1942. Martinovich football career was interrupted by a stint in the United States Army during World War II.

Martinovich returned to pro football in 1946 by playing in one game for the Newark Bombers of the American Football League. He then signed with the Brooklyn Dodgers of the All-America Football Conference (AAFC). He appeared in ten gams, starting six, for the Dodgers during the 1946 AAFC season, converting five of ten field goals and 21 of 22 extra points. Martinovich played in all 14 games, starting five, for the Dodgers in 1947, making three of 20 field goals and 22 of 25 extra points.

== Personal life ==
Martinovich died on September 22, 196, in West Sacramento, California.
