= 1944 All-Service football team =

American military football players

The 1944 All-Service football team is composed of American football players who were selected as by various organizations and writers as the best football players at their respective positions who were serving in the military and playing on military service football teams in 1944.

== Ends ==
- Jack Russell, Randolph Field (AP-1)
- Nick Susoeff, Second Air Force (AP-1)
- Bolo Perdue, St. Mary's Pre-Flight (AP-2)
- Kenneth Whitney, Ft. Warren (AP-2)

== Tackles ==
- Joe Stydahar, Fleet City NTS (AP-1)
- John Woudenberg, St. Mary's Pre-Flight (AP-1)
- Vic Schleich, Iowa Pre-Flight (AP-2)
- Donald Cohenour, Ft. Pierce (AP-2)

== Guards ==
- Buster Ramsey, Bainbridge (AP-1)
- Russ Letlow, Camp Peary (AP-1)
- Harold Jungmichael, San Diego NTC (AP-2)
- Morris Klein, Great Lakes (AP-2)

== Center ==
- George Strohmeyer, Iowa Pre-Flight (AP-1)
- Thomas Robertson, Randolph Field (AP-2)

== Backs ==
- Otto Graham, North Carolina Pre-Flight (AP-1)
- Charley Trippi, Third Air Force (AP-1)
- Bill Dudley, Randolph Field (AP-1)
- Len Eshmont, Norman NAB (AP-1)
- Jack Jacobs, Fourth Air Force (AP-2)
- Charlie Justice, Bainbridge (AP-2)
- Glenn Dobbs, Second Air Force (AP-2)
- Bill Daley, Fort Pierce (AP-2)

== Key ==
- AP = Associated Press

== See also ==
- 1944 College Football All-America Team
