= O'Neal Adams =

American football and basketball player (1919–1998)

No. 30, 28, 54
- Position: End

Personal information
- Born: January 21, 1919; Beebe, Arkansas, U.S.
- Died: October 27, 1998 (aged 79); Sand Springs, Oklahoma, U.S.
- Listed height: 6 ft 3 in (1.91 m)
- Listed weight: 195 lb (88 kg)

Career information
- High school: Beebe (Beebe, Arkansas)
- College: Arkansas

Career history
- New York Giants (1942–1945); Brooklyn Dodgers (1946–1947)

Career statistics
- Games played: 52
- Receptions: 43
- Receiving Yards: 719
- Touchdowns: 7
- Stats at Pro Football Reference

Howard O'Neal Adams (January 21, 1919 – October 27, 1998), also known as Neal Adams, was an American professional football and basketball player. Born in El Paso, Arkansas, Adams played both sports for the Arkansas Razorbacks. Professionally, Adams played as an end in the National Football League for the New York Giants (1942–1945) and in the All-America Football Conference for the Brooklyn Dodgers (1946–1947). He also competed in the National Basketball League for the Oshkosh All-Stars during the 1942–43 season and averaged 0.7 points per game.
