= Jim Castiglia =

American football player (1918–2007)

No. 31, 75, 26
- Position: Fullback

Personal information
- Born: September 30, 1918; Passaic, New Jersey, U.S.
- Died: December 26, 2007 (aged 89); Rockville, Maryland, U.S.
- Listed height: 5 ft 11 in (1.80 m)
- Listed weight: 208 lb (94 kg)

Career information
- High school: Passaic
- College: Georgetown
- NFL draft: 1941: 21st round, 202nd overall pick

Career history
- Philadelphia Eagles (1941, 1945–1946); Baltimore Colts (1947); Washington Redskins (1947–1948)

Career NFL/AAFC statistics
- Rushing yards: 1,073
- Rushing average: 3.3
- Receptions: 34
- Receiving yards: 246
- Total touchdowns: 13
- Stats at Pro Football Reference

Jim Castiglia
- Catcher
- Batted: Left Threw: Right

MLB debut
- April 14, 1942, for the Philadelphia Athletics

Last MLB appearance
- June 13, 1942, for the Philadelphia Athletics

MLB statistics
- Batting average: .389
- Home runs: 0
- RBI: 2
- Stats at Baseball Reference

Teams
- Philadelphia Athletics (1942)

James Vincent Castiglia (September 30, 1918 – December 26, 2007) was an American professional football fullback in the National Football League (NFL) for the Washington Redskins and Philadelphia Eagles as well as the Baltimore Colts of the All-America Football Conference (AAFC). He also briefly played Major League Baseball as a catcher for the Philadelphia Athletics.

On September 7, 1947, Castiglia scored the first touchdown in Baltimore Colts franchise history on a kickoff fumble recovery.

== Biography ==
=== Early life ===
Jim Castiglia was born September 30, 1918, in Passaic, New Jersey. He attended Passaic High School where he was a three-sport athlete, making his mark on the football team as a star fullback, as a guard on the basketball team, and the baseball team as a catcher.

Regarded as a particularly hard tackler on defense and a powerful runner of the football, Castiglia was elected 1936 team captain by his teammates at the end of the 1935 season. Castiglia led his team to the New Jersey Group IV state championship in 1936 and was selected to the All-County team for the Passaic County Interscholastic League.

=== College career ===
Castiglia attended Georgetown University in Washington, D.C. in 1937, gaining notice of the coaches of the school's freshman football team as "one of the greatest backs in many years" to attend the school.

He became eligible to play for head coach Jack Hagerty's varsity football squad as a sophomore in 1938. He was not regarded as a star during the 1938 or 1939 seasons, only finding his way during his 1940 senior year. In the third game of the 1940 season against Temple University, Castiglia popped a 16-yard run up the middle for a touchdown, helping the Hoyas continue their undefeated record that dated back to 1937.

During his 1940 senior season, Castiglia missed time due to a hip injury, but nevertheless gained the notice of some pro football talent scouts. Georgetown would only lose one game during the 1940 regular season, coming up one point short to undefeated Boston College, and would play in the 1941 Orange Bowl Game, losing to Mississippi State University by a touchdown.

Castiglia also kept his baseball career alive at Georgetown as a catcher in 1939, 1940, and 1941 — with Castiglia attracting the attention of pro scouts as a senior, despite questionable throwing ability from behind the plate. During his senior year, Castiglia hit .400 with 4 home runs for the Hoyas.

=== Professional football ===
In December 1940, Castiglia was drafted with the final pick of the 21st round of the 1941 NFL draft by the Pittsburgh Steelers. Castiglia never played for the Steelers, who assigned his rights to the Philadelphia Eagles ahead of training camp for the 1941 NFL season. He signing with the Eagles was announced on July 11, 1941.

During his 1941 rookie season with the Eagles, Castiglia carried the ball 60 times for 183 yards (3.0 yards per carry).

=== Professional baseball ===
After finishing the 1941 Georgetown baseball season, Castiglia signed a professional baseball contract with the Detroit Tigers of the American League, who assigned him to the Buffalo Bisons, a minor league affiliate, for further development.

Castiglia was apparently released by the Tigers, but was subsequently invited by the Philadelphia Athletics to their 1942 spring training in Florida as an unsigned bullpen catcher. Castiglia left camp with an A's contract and saw action with the big league club for a 16-game stint in 1942. He was mostly used as a pinch-hitter, catching in just three games. He hit the ball extremely well during his brief time in "the show," going 7-for-18, a .389 batting average, with two runs batted in and scoring two runs.

This would be Castiglia's only stint in Major League Baseball, cut short by his mid-season enlistment in the US Army.

=== World War II ===
In July 1942, Castiglia joined the United States Army. He was initially sent to El Paso, Texas to be made part of a cavalry unit but was soon transferred to Officer Candidate School for the United States Army Air Forces at Miami Beach, Florida, from which he graduated with a commission of second lieutenant. Following graduation from OCS, he was assigned to Atlantic City Training Center as a physical training officer before being transferred to Jefferson Barracks in Lemay, Missouri.

Among Castiglia's duties while stationed in Missouri was coaching the football team of the 30th Training Group of the Army Air Forces.

The year 1944 saw Castiglia assigned to the Greensboro Training Center of the Army Air Forces, locate in Greensboro, North Carolina. In addition to his training duties, Castiglia was a member of the Greensboro Tech-Hawks baseball team, playing catcher. Frequently batting out of the five-hole, the left-handed batter Castiglia hit .391 for the Tech-Hawks for the 1944 season. He also played baseball for the Tech-Hawks in 1945.

=== Return to professional athletics ===
Castiglia remained in uniform as a US Army Air Forces officer through 1945, although he did manage to use furlough time to make his way from Greensboro to join the Philadelphia Eagles in their November 25, 1945, game against the Washington Redskins. Sporting his familiar No. 31 jersey, the fullback started the game and toted the ball 13 times for 29 yards in his only game action of the season.

By February 1946, with the war over, Castiglia had been discharged from the military. He reported to spring training for the Philadelphia A's at West Palm Beach, Florida on February 23. He was apparently released from the team shortly thereafter and on April 22 he signed a contract to play football for the Philadelphia Eagles for 1946. He only started 2 of 11 games for the team in 1946, however, gaining just 87 yards on 39 carries (2.2 yards per run) and adding another 51 yards through the air on 11 receptions. He scored one touchdown during the year.

On August 4, 1947, head coach Cecil Isbell announced that Jim Castiglia had signed a contract with the Baltimore Colts of the new All-America Football Conference (AAFC). Terms of the contract were not announced. Although he only played two games for the Colts, Castiglia holds the honor of scoring the first touchdown in the history of the Baltimore franchise.

For the September 7 opener at the original Baltimore Municipal Stadium, the Colts kicked off to their opponents, the Brooklyn Dodgers, on a muddy field in a heavy rain. Brooklyn kick returner Elmore Harris took the ball at the 5 yard line and got it back to the 25, where he fumbled. The ball was recovered by his teammate Harry Buffington, an offensive lineman, who took to midfield before being spun around by an attempted tackler. Buffington took the ball all the way back to his own end zone where, realizing his mistake, he attempted to throw the ball away — straight into the hands of Castiglia of the Colts, for a wild touchdown. Baltimore eventually won the game by a score of 16–7.

Castiglia left the Colts after just two games and signed with the Washington Redskins of the NFL for the remainder of the 1947 season and seeing action in seven games as a reserve. He carried the ball 104 times for the Redskins in 1947, gaining a career high 426 yards (4.1 yards per carry) and adding another 88 yards through the air. He scored 5 touchdowns in the season, also a career best.

Castiglia retired from the NFL following the 1948 season.

=== Later life ===
Castiglia was married to Catherine Marie Kane of Washington, DC, in July 1942.

=== Death and legacy ===
Castiglia died December 26, 2007, in Rockville, Maryland. He is buried in Gate of Heaven Cemetery in Aspen Hill, Maryland.
