= Dub Jones (American football) =

American football player and coach (1924–2024)

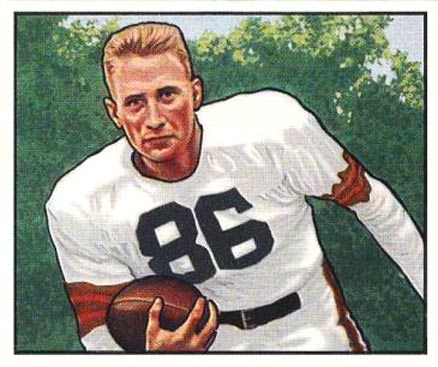
- Jones on a 1950 Bowman football card

No. 9, 99, 73, 91, 86, 40
- Position: Back

Personal information
- Born: December 29, 1924; Arcadia, Louisiana, U.S.
- Died: November 2, 2024 (aged 99); Ruston, Louisiana, U.S.
- Listed height: 6 ft 4 in (1.93 m)
- Listed weight: 202 lb (92 kg)

Career information
- High school: Ruston
- College: LSU (1942); Tulane (1943-1944)
- NFL draft: 1946: 1st round, 2nd overall pick

Career history

Playing
- Miami Seahawks (1946); Brooklyn Dodgers (1946–1947); Cleveland Browns (1948–1955)

Coaching
- Cleveland Browns (1963–1964) Backfield & ends coach; Cleveland Browns (1965) Quarterbacks, running backs & tight ends coach; Cleveland Browns (1966–1968) Quarterbacks & running backs coach

Awards and highlights
- As player: 3× NFL champion (1950, 1954, 1955); 2× AAFC champion (1948, 1949); First-team All-Pro (1951); 2× Pro Bowl (1951, 1952); Cleveland Browns Legends; First-team All-SEC (1944); As assistant coach: NFL champion (1964)

Career NFL/AAFC statistics
- Rushing yards: 2,210
- Rushing average: 4.1
- Receptions: 171
- Receiving yards: 2,874
- Total touchdowns: 41
- Stats at Pro Football Reference

William Augustus "Dub" Jones (December 29, 1924 – November 2, 2024) was an American professional football player who was a halfback for ten seasons in the National Football League (NFL) and the All-America Football Conference (AAFC) in the late 1940s and early 1950s, primarily for the Cleveland Browns. He shares the NFL record for touchdowns scored in a single game, with six.

Jones was born into an athletic family in Louisiana and played a variety of sports, including football, at his high school in Ruston. The team won the state championship in 1941, his senior year. He attended Louisiana State University on a scholarship for a year before being transferred to Tulane University in New Orleans as part of a World War II–era U.S. Navy training program. He played college football for the Tulane Green Wave for two seasons before joining the Miami Seahawks of the new AAFC in 1946.

The Seahawks traded Jones at the end of the 1946 season to the AAFC's Brooklyn Dodgers, who subsequently sent him to the Browns before the 1948 season. That year, the Browns won all of their games and the AAFC championship. The team repeated as champions in 1949, but the AAFC dissolved at the end of the year and the Browns joined the NFL. A tall flanker back and a running and receiving threat, he was a key part of Browns teams that won NFL championships in 1950, 1954 and 1955. He was twice named to the Pro Bowl, the NFL's all-star game, including in 1951, when he set his touchdown record.

Jones retired after the 1955 season, but returned to the Browns as an assistant coach in 1963. The Browns won the NFL championship the following year. He left football for good in 1968 and went back to Ruston, where he worked with one of his sons in a general contracting business. He is a member of the Louisiana Sports Hall of Fame and the Greater New Orleans Sports Hall of Fame.

== Early life and college ==
Jones was born on December 29, 1924, in Arcadia, Louisiana, but moved with his mother and three older brothers to nearby Ruston after his father died when he was three years old. His brothers were all athletes. He played Little League Baseball as a child and went to watch boxing matches and baseball and football games at the nearby Louisiana Tech University.

Jones attended Ruston High School starting in 1938, and played football under head coach L.J. "Hoss" Garrett. He was small in stature and did not make the first team until his senior year in 1941. Ruston's Bearcats football team won its first-ever state championship that year, with Jones playing left halfback and tailback. Jones also played baseball and basketball and boxed in high school.

After graduating, Jones got a scholarship to attend Louisiana State University (LSU) in Baton Rouge, where one of his brothers played football. He stayed there for a year before joining the U.S. Navy as American involvement in World War II intensified. The Navy transferred him to a V-12 training program at Tulane University in New Orleans, where he played as a halfback and a safety in 1943 and 1944.

Jones carried the football for a total of 700 yards of rushing and scored four touchdowns in 1944, his junior year, and was named an All-American and an All-Southeastern Conference player by sportswriters. He trained as a fireman aboard submarines while in the Navy, and in 1945 he played football for a military team at the Naval Submarine Base New London in New London, Connecticut. Before beginning his professional career, he played in the 1946 Chicago College All-Star Game, a now-defunct annual contest between the National Football League champion and a squad of the country's best college players. Led by quarterback and future teammate Otto Graham, the college players beat the Los Angeles Rams 16–0 that year.

== Professional career ==
Jones was selected by the Chicago Cardinals of the National Football League (NFL) with the second pick in the 1946 NFL draft, but did not sign with the team as he pondered returning to LSU to finish his studies. When the Miami Seahawks of the new All-America Football Conference (AAFC) offered him a $12,000 contract, he accepted it and joined the team. The Seahawks won just three games in 1946, the AAFC's first season of play, and Jones was traded along with two other players to the Brooklyn Dodgers, another AAFC team, in December. The Seahawks, meanwhile, folded and were moved to Baltimore after the season because of poor attendance and shaky finances. Jones played sparingly for the Dodgers in the last three games of the 1946 season, rushing for 62 yards on 19 carries.

The Dodgers traded for Jones in part to replace Glenn Dobbs – a star tailback in Brooklyn's single-wing offense – because Dobbs was suffering from injuries. He too was hurt early in the 1947 season, hit by Bill Willis of the Cleveland Browns. Injuries to his knee, hip and clavicle forced him to sit out for several weeks. He broke his hand when he returned and had to play exclusively on defense for the rest of the season.

Paul Brown, the head coach of the Browns, was impressed with Jones's defensive play for Brooklyn, and traded away the rights to University of Michigan star Bob Chappuis to acquire him in June 1948. Jones began his career with the Browns as a defensive back, but was switched to halfback early in the 1948 season because his performance on defense wasn't up to Brown's standards. Jones played on offense alongside Graham, the team's quarterback, and star fullback Marion Motley as the Browns won all of their games in 1948 and beat the Buffalo Bills for their third straight AAFC championship. He ended the year with 149 rushing yards on 33 carries.

Over the next two seasons, Jones developed into a star flanker, a position he helped invent. He was both a running threat and a receiver – his tall stature was well-suited to receiving – and helped complement a passing attack that featured the Browns' two main ends, Dante Lavelli and Mac Speedie. Jones often went in motion behind the line of scrimmage before the snap at a time when few players did so, causing confusion and mismatches on defense. He had 312 rushing yards and 241 receiving yards in 1949, when the Browns won another AAFC championship.

Jones came into his own in the 1950 season, when the Browns joined the NFL following the dissolution of the AAFC. Cleveland won the NFL championship against the Rams that year, helped by Jones's skill receiving short passes underneath opponents' coverage. Jones had 31 receptions and 11 rushing and receiving touchdowns in 1950.

Jones continued to excel in 1951, scoring 12 touchdowns and amassing a career-high 1,062 yards from scrimmage. He tied an NFL record in a November 25 game by scoring six touchdowns - 4 rushing, 2 receiving - in a 42–21 win over the Chicago Bears, a single-game record he shares with Ernie Nevers (1929), Gale Sayers (1965), and Alvin Kamara (2020). The Browns finished the season with an 11–1 win–loss record and advanced to the championship game, but lost this time to the Rams. Jones came in second in the NFL in touchdowns scored and was named to the Pro Bowl, the league's all-star game. He was also selected by sportswriters as a first-team All-Pro. "Dub has the speed, the guts and the know-how of a great player," Paul Brown said at the time, calling him "the most underrated player in the league."

Jones made the Pro Bowl again in 1952, when he had 952 total yards and six touchdowns. Cleveland advanced to the NFL championship for the third time in a row that year, losing 17–7 to the Detroit Lions. In 1953, Jones's production declined: he had just 401 total yards and no touchdowns, and he decided to retire after the Browns reached and lost another championship game. He went back to Ruston to work at a lumber business he ran in the offseason, but Brown asked him to return in 1954, saying the team needed him. Jones played for two more years, winning two more championships with the Browns before retiring for good. He pulled his hamstring in an exhibition game before the 1955 season, an injury that caused him to miss several games and bothered him all season.

== NFL/AAFC career statistics ==
Legend
	Won the NFL championship or AAFC Championship
	Led the league
**Bold**	Career high

=== Regular season ===
Year	Team	Games		Rushing					Receiving				
Year	Team	GP	GS	Att	Yds	Avg	Lng	TD	Rec	Yds	Avg	Lng	TD
1946	MIA	9	3	24	102	4.3	-	0	0	0	0.0	-	0
1946	BDA	2	1	19	62	3.3	-	0	0	0	0.0	-	0
1947	BDA	8	2	43	136	3.2	-	1	0	0	0.0	-	0
1948	CLE	12	2	33	149	4.5	-	1	9	119	13.2	-	2
1949	CLE	11	9	77	312	4.1	-	4	12	241	20.1	-	1
1950	CLE	12	12	83	384	4.6	**61**	6	31	458	14.8	80	**5**
1951	CLE	12	12	**104**	**492**	**4.7**	43	**7**	30	570	19.0	**81**	**5**
1952	CLE	12	12	65	270	4.2	35	2	**43**	**651**	15.1	63	4
1953	CLE	12	6	31	28	0.9	10	0	24	373	15.5	58	0
1954	CLE	12	8	51	231	4.5	24	0	19	347	18.3	48	2
1955	CLE	12	6	10	44	4.4	13	0	3	115	**38.3**	46	1
		114	73	540	2,210	4.1	61	21	171	2,874	16.8	81	20

=== Playoffs ===
Year	Team	Games		Rushing					Receiving				
Year	Team	GP	GS	Att	Yds	Avg	Lng	TD	Rec	Yds	Avg	Lng	TD
1948	CLE	1	1	5	22	4.4	6	0	2	13	6.5	10	0
1949	CLE	2	2	9	23	2.6	-	**1**	2	74	**37.0**	**49**	**1**
1950	CLE	2	2	**14**	**36**	2.6	10	0	**4**	**80**	20.0	31	**1**
1951	CLE	1	1	9	12	1.3	6	0	**4**	62	15.5	26	**1**
1953	CLE	1	0	3	28	**9.3**	**19**	0	0	0	0.0	0	0
1954	CLE	1	0	3	3	1.0	3	0	0	0	0.0	0	0
1955	CLE	1	0	1	3	3.0	13	0	1	11	11.0	11	0
		9	6	44	127	2.9	19	1	13	240	18.5	49	3

== Later life and coaching career ==
Jones spent seven years working at his business in Ruston after leaving the Browns. He worked briefly as a special instructor for the Houston Oilers and an occasional advisor to college programs in Louisiana, but otherwise was out of football. He returned to the Browns as an assistant coach in March 1963, after Paul Brown was fired by team owner Art Modell. Blanton Collier, Brown's long-time deputy, became head coach and put Jones in charge of the receivers. Jones and Collier had been close during his playing days, and Collier considered him an astute student of the game.

Under Collier, Jones supervised the offensive backfield and the ends, but was also the Browns' offensive play-caller. He directed the team from the press box on Collier's behalf because Collier was hard of hearing and could not do so himself. The Browns won their first six games at the beginning of Jones's coaching career in the 1963 season, although a late slump cost them a spot in the championship game. The team regrouped the following year, ending with a 10–3–1 win–loss–tie record and winning the NFL's eastern division. Cleveland went on to win the championship game against the Baltimore Colts in 1964. The Browns advanced to the championship game again the following year, but lost to the Green Bay Packers. During his tenure as a coach, Jones was the primary position coach for running backs Jim Brown and Leroy Kelly, both of whom are members of the Pro Football Hall of Fame. He also coached receiver Paul Warfield, another hall of fame member who helped propel the Browns to the 1964 championship.

Jones stayed with the Browns until early 1968, when he quit and was replaced by Nick Skorich. The Browns had offered him a part-time coaching job but made clear that he could not stay on as offensive coordinator; Jones declined the reduced role. After leaving the Browns, Jones moved back to Ruston and did occasional scouting for the team at the nearby Grambling State University. He was also a volunteer coach of receivers on Grambling's football team. Later in life, he worked for his son Tom's general contracting business in Ruston.

Jones was inducted into the Louisiana Sports Hall of Fame in 1982 and the Greater New Orleans Sports Hall of Fame in 1984.

== Personal life and death ==
Jones was married to Schumpert Barnes, one of his classmates from Ruston High School, from June 1946 until his death 78 years later. He had seven children, including four sons who played college football. His son Bert Jones was a quarterback who played 10 seasons in the 1970s and 1980s for the Baltimore Colts and Los Angeles Rams and won the NFL's most valuable player award in 1976.

Dub Jones died at home in Ruston on November 2, 2024, at the age of 99. He was one of the oldest NFL players at the time of his death. He was a month and 27 days shy of what would have been his 100th birthday.
