= Howie Turner =

American gridiron football player (1922–2004)

Profile
- Position: Halfback

Personal information
- Born: October 13, 1922; Rocky Mount, North Carolina, U.S.
- Died: November 2, 2004 (aged 82); Ottawa, Ontario, Canada
- Listed height: 5 ft 11 in (1.80 m)
- Listed weight: 173 lb (78 kg)

Career information
- College: North Carolina State
- NFL draft: 1947: 7th round, 50th overall pick

Career history
- 1947–1954: Ottawa Rough Riders

Awards and highlights
- Grey Cup champion (1951); 3× First-team All-SoCon (1944, 1945, 1946)

Howard "Touchdown" Turner (October 13, 1922 – November 2, 2004) was a Canadian football player who played for the Ottawa Rough Riders. He won the Grey Cup with them in 1951. He previously played football for and attended North Carolina State University. He died in 2004.
