= Hugo Marcolini =

American football player (1923–1963)

- Marcolini at Mahawah High School

No. 71
- Position: Back

Personal information
- Born: April 7, 1923; Brooklyn, New York, U.S.
- Died: September 22, 1963 (aged 40); Saddle River, New Jersey, U.S.
- Listed height: 6 ft 0 in (1.83 m)
- Listed weight: 204 lb (93 kg)

Career information
- High school: St. Joseph's (Canada)
- College: St. Bonaventure
- NFL draft: 1947: 16th round, 137th overall pick

Career history
- Brooklyn Dodgers (1948)

Career NFL statistics
- Games: 10
- Stats at Pro Football Reference

Hugo Francis Marcolini (April 7, 1923 – September 22, 1963) was an American professional football player who played at the back position on both offense and defense. He played college football for St. Bonaventure in 1946 and 1947 and professional football for the Brooklyn Dodgers in 1948.

== Early life ==
Marcolini was born in 1923 in Brooklyn. He served in the United States Marine Corps during World War II.

== College football and military service ==
Marcolini played college football for St. Bonaventure during its 1946 and 1947 seasons.

== Professional football ==
He was selected by the Boston Yanks in the 16th round (137th overall pick) of the 1947 NFL draft but did not play for the Yanks. He played professional football in the All-America Football Conference (AAFC) for the Brooklyn Dodgers during their 1948 season. He appeared in 10 or 11 games for the Dodgers.

== Later life ==
After retiring as a player, Marcolini coached the football team at St. Cecilia High School in Englewood, New Jersey, from 1952 to 1957 and at Mahwah High School in Mahwah, New Jersey, from 1958 to 1963, compiling a record of 43-31-10. He died in 1963 of a heart attack at age 40.
