= Nick Forkovitch =

American football player (1919–1998)

No. 51, 64
- Position: Fullback

Personal information
- Born: March 1, 1919; McKeesport, Pennsylvania, U.S.
- Died: April 5, 1998 (aged 79); Harrisonburg, Virginia, U.S.
- Listed height: 5 ft 11 in (1.80 m)
- Listed weight: 195 lb (88 kg)

Career information
- High school: Augusta Military Academy (VA)
- College: William & Mary
- NFL draft: 1945: 29th round, 304th overall pick

Career history
- Richmond Rebels (1947); Brooklyn Dodgers (1948)

Career AAFC statistics
- Games played: 9
- Stats at Pro Football Reference

Nick John Forkovitch (March 1, 1919 – April 5, 1998) was an American professional football player for the All-America Football Conference (AAFC)'s Brooklyn Dodgers. He played in 9 games in the 1948 season after his collegiate career at William & Mary. He had one rush for 4 yards. His head coach for the Dodgers was Carl M. Voyles, who was his head coach at William & Mary in 1942.
