= Lee Tevis =

American football player (1920–1992)

No. 92
- Positions: Halfback, fullback, linebacker

Personal information
- Born: December 29, 1920; Beaumont, Texas, U.S.
- Died: August 23, 1992 (aged 71); Houston, Texas, U.S.
- Listed height: 5 ft 11 in (1.80 m)
- Listed weight: 200 lb (91 kg)

Career information
- High school: Beaumont (TX)
- College: Washington University, Miami (OH), Michigan

Career history
- Brooklyn Dodgers (1947-1948)

Career statistics
- Games: 22
- Stats at Pro Football Reference

Lee Kessler Tevis (December 29, 1920 – August 23, 1992) was an American football player who played at the halfback, fullback, and linebacker positions. He played college football for Washington University in St. Louis and Miami (OH) and professional football for the Brooklyn Dodgers in 1947 and 1948.

== Early life ==
Tevis was born in 1920 in Beaumont, Texas. He attended Beaumont High School. He was a triple-threat back and star for the Beaumont High School football team.

== College football and military service ==
Tevis played at halfback for Washington University in 1942. He developed a reputation at Washington University as "a powerful, steamrolling runner."

He entered the United States Marine Corps and was transferred to Miami University in Ohio as part of the V-12 Navy College Training Program. While participating in the V-12 program, he played at the fullback position for the 1943 Miami Redskins football team. He also handled punting for Miami and was rated one of Miami's greatest punters in years.

He subsequently was called to active duty and served in China.

Tevis enrolled at the University of Michigan in 1946 and was on the roster of the 1946 Michigan Wolverines football team as a fullback. However, he was unable to play due to illness.

== Professional football ==
In April 1947, Tevis signed to play professional football in the All-America Football Conference (AAFC) with the Brooklyn Dodgers. He played for the Dodgers during their 1947 and 1948 seasons, appearing in a total of 22 games. He was elevated as the Dodgers' No. right halfback in August 1948. He also handled punting and extra points for the Dodgers.

== Later life ==
After his football career ended, he worked as a salesman for Big Four Chevrolet in St. Louis. He later managed a truck dealership in San Diego. After retirement, he moved to Houston. In August 1992, Tevis died following a heart attack at his home in Houston at age 71.
