= Tom Scott (American football coach) =

American football coach

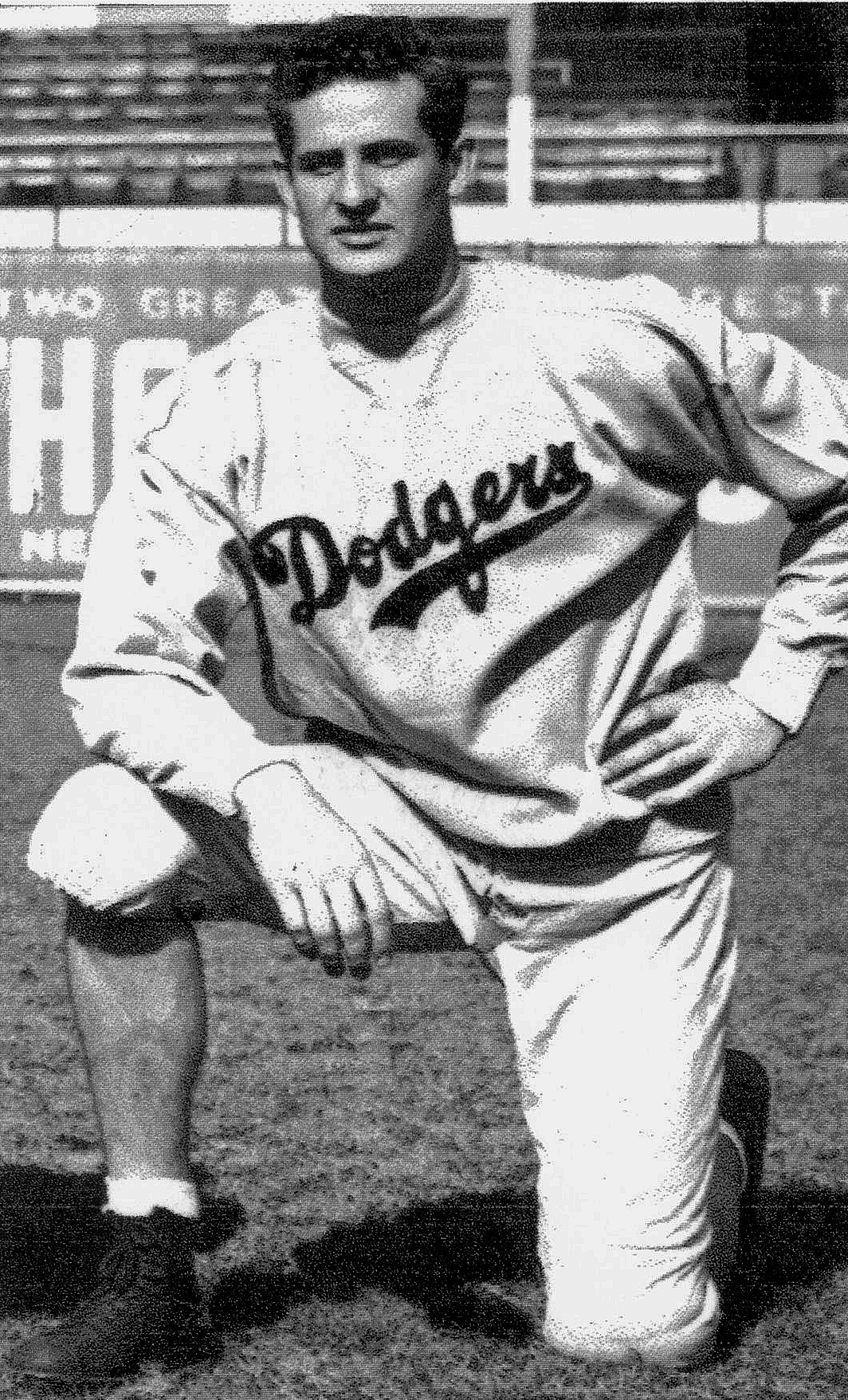

Personal information
- Born: January 7, 1920
- Died: June 1978 (aged 58)

Career history
- Brooklyn Dodgers (1946) Co-head coach (with Cliff Battles and Mal Stevens); Brooklyn Dodgers (1947) Assistant coach

Head coaching record
- Regular season: 1–6–0 (.143)
- Coaching profile at Pro Football Reference

Thomas P. Scott (January 7, 1920 – June 1978) was an American football coach who was co-head coach for the Brooklyn Dodgers in 1946. He was also the assistant coach in 1947.
