= Johnny Clowes =

American football player (1921–1978)

No. 21
- Position: Guard / Tackle

Personal information
- Born: December 15, 1921; Williamsburg, Virginia, U.S.
- Died: February 13, 1978 (aged 56); Norfolk, Virginia, U.S.
- Listed height: 6 ft 1 in (1.85 m)
- Listed weight: 240 lb (109 kg)

Career information
- High school: Matthew Whaley School (Williamsburg, Virginia); Fork Union Military Academy (Fork Union, Virginia)
- College: William & Mary
- NFL draft: 1948

Career history
- Brooklyn Dodgers (1948); Chicago Hornets (1949); New York Yanks (1950–1951)

Awards and highlights
- First-team All-SoCon (1944)

Career NFL statistics
- Games played: 49
- Stats at Pro Football Reference

John Alexander Clowes (December 15, 1921 – February 13, 1978) was an American professional football player for the All-America Football Conference (AAFC)'s Brooklyn Dodgers and Chicago Hornets as well as the National Football League (NFL)'s New York Yanks. He played between 1948 and 1951 after playing college football for the William & Mary Tribe. He died on February 13, 1978, at his home in Norfolk, Virginia.
