= Elmer Barbour =

American football player (1919–1993)

No. 6
- Position: Back

Personal information
- Born: February 2, 1919; Rocky Mount, North Carolina, U.S.
- Died: February 10, 1993 (aged 74); Norfolk, Virginia, U.S.
- Listed height: 6 ft 1 in (1.85 m)
- Listed weight: 200 lb (91 kg)

Career information
- High school: Durham (Durham, North Carolina)
- College: Wake Forest
- NFL draft: 1945: 1st round, 10th overall pick

Career history
- New York Giants (1945)

Awards and highlights
- First-team All-SoCon (1944)

Career NFL statistics
- Fumble recoveries: 1
- Stats at Pro Football Reference

Wesley Elmer Barbour II (February 2, 1919 – February 10, 1993) was an American professional football blocking back and linebacker who played for the National Football League (NFL)'s New York Giants during the 1945 season.

After attending Durham High School in Durham, North Carolina, Barbour played college football at Wake Forest for four years. He captained the team in 1943 (as a co-captain) and 1944, his junior and senior years. Barbour was an all-conference team selection in both years, and won the Jacobs Blocking Trophy as the best blocking back in the Southern Conference as a senior. The Wake Forest Sports Hall of Fame inducted him in 2003.

In the 1945 NFL draft, the Giants took Barbour in the first round with the 10th overall pick. Barbour became the first player from Wake Forest to be selected in the opening round of an NFL draft. He played in three games for the Giants in 1945, starting in each and recording one fumble recovery. The Giants did not bring Barbour back in 1946 following an offensive formation change by head coach Steve Owen. The Pittsburgh Steelers signed him, but he did not appear in any games for the team. Following his playing career, Barbour became a head coach at Durham High School, then joined Wake Forest from 1956 to 1960 in an assistant position. He was later an assistant at South Carolina.
