= Dan Edwards =

American gridiron football player and coach (1926–2001)

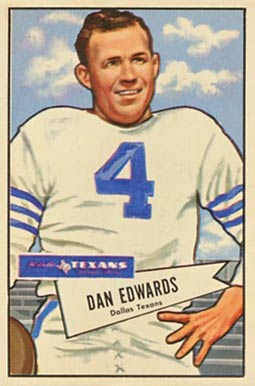
- Edwards on a 1952 Bowman football card

No. 51, 4, 82, 71
- Position: End

Personal information
- Born: July 18, 1926; Osage, Texas, U.S.
- Died: August 7, 2001 (aged 75); Gatesville, Texas, U.S.
- Listed height: 6 ft 1 in (1.85 m)
- Listed weight: 197 lb (89 kg)

Career information
- High school: Gatesville
- College: Georgia (1944-1947)
- NFL draft: 1948: 1st round, 9th overall pick

Career history

Playing
- Brooklyn Dodgers (1948); Chicago Hornets (1949); New York Yanks (1950–1951); Dallas Texans (1952); Baltimore Colts (1953–1954); BC Lions (1955-1957)

Coaching
- BC Lions (1958) Head coach; Edmonton Eskimos (1959–1961) Line

Awards and highlights
- First-team All-Pro (1950); Pro Bowl (1950); NFL record for shortest kick off return for a touchdown (17 yards); First-team All-SEC (1947)

Career NFL/AAFC statistics
- Receptions: 234
- Receiving yards: 2,898
- Receiving touchdowns: 16
- Stats at Pro Football Reference

Daniel Moody Edwards (August 17, 1926 – August 7, 2001) was an American gridiron football player and coach. He played professional as an end in the All-America Football Conference (AAFC), the Canadian Football League (CFL), and the National Football League (NFL).

== Biography ==
Edwards played college football at Georgia. Drafted by the Pittsburgh Steelers in the first round (ninth overall) of the 1948 NFL draft, Edwards played for the AAFC's Brooklyn Dodgers (1948) and Chicago Hornets (1949) and the NFL's New York Yanks (1950–1951), Dallas Texans (1952) and Baltimore Colts (1953–1954). In 1950, he was selected for the Pro Bowl and First-team All-Pro. He holds the record for the shortest kick off return for a touchdown, 17 yards, set on October 17, 1949.

Following his playing career, Edwards spent four seasons as a coach with the BC Lions and Edmonton Eskimos before leaving football to become an oil executive.

== NFL/AAFC career statistics ==
Legend
**Bold**	Career high

Year	Team	Games		Receiving				
Year	Team	GP	GS	Rec	Yds	Avg	Lng	TD
1948	BDA	11	7	23	176	7.7	-	0
1949	CHH	12	12	42	573	13.6	66	3
1950	NYY	12	12	**52**	**775**	**14.9**	**82**	**6**
1951	NYY	11	11	39	509	13.1	53	3
1952	DTX	1	1	3	22	7.3	13	0
1953	BAL	12	12	35	312	8.9	32	3
1954	BAL	12	12	40	531	13.3	42	1
Career		71	67	234	2,898	12.4	82	16
