= 1946 New York Yankees (AAFC) season =

American football team season

- Owner: Dan Topping
- Head coach: Ray Flaherty
- Home stadium: Yankee Stadium

Results
- Record: 10–3–1
- Division place: 1st AAFC East
- Playoffs: Lost AAFC Championship (at Browns) 9–14

The 1946 New York Yankees season was their inaugural season in the All-America Football Conference. The team finished 10–3–1, finishing first in the East Division and qualifying for the playoffs. The team, however, lost to the Cleveland Browns in the AAFC Championship.

The team's statistical leaders included Ace Parker with 763 passing yards, Spec Sanders with 709 rushing yards, 259 receiving yards, and 72 points scored. Sanders total of 709 rushing yards also led the AAFC.

== Schedule ==
Game	Date	Opponent	Result	Record	Venue	Attendance	Recap	Sources
1	September 8	at San Francisco 49ers	**W** 21–7	1–0	Kezar Stadium	35,000	Recap	
2	September 14	at **Buffalo Bisons**	**W** 21–10	2–0	Civic Stadium	40,606	Recap	
3	September 20	at Chicago Rockets	**T** 17–17	2–0–1	Soldier Field	25,000	Recap	
4	September 29	at Cleveland Browns	**L** 7–24	2–1–1	Municipal Stadium	57,084	Recap	
5	October 4	**Buffalo Bisons**	**W** 21–13	3–1–1	Yankee Stadium	17,101	Recap	
6	October 12	Cleveland Browns	**L** 0–7	3–2–1	Yankee Stadium	34,252	Recap	
7	October 19	**Brooklyn Dodgers**	**W** 21–10	4–2–1	Yankee Stadium	30,212	Recap	
8	October 27	at Los Angeles Dons	**W** 31–17	5–2–1	LA Memorial Coliseum	15,000	Recap	
9	November 3	**Miami Seahawks**	**W** 24–21	6–2–1	Yankee Stadium	18,800	Recap	
10	November 10	Los Angeles Dons	**W** 17–12	7–2–1	Yankee Stadium	30,765	Recap	
11	November 17	San Francisco 49ers	**W** 10–9	8–2–1	Yankee Stadium	18,695	Recap	
12	November 24	Chicago Rockets	**L** 28–38	8–3–1	Yankee Stadium	21,270	Recap	
13	November 28	at **Brooklyn Dodgers**	**W** 21–7	9–3–1	Ebbets Field	16,240	Recap	
14	December 9	at **Miami Seahawks**	**W** 31–0	10–3–1	Burdine Stadium	7,090	Recap	
Note: Intra-division opponents are in **bold** text.

== Playoffs ==
Round	Date	Opponent	Result	Venue	Game recap
Championship	December 22	at Cleveland Browns	L 9–14	Cleveland Municipal Stadium	Recap

== Standings ==
AAFC Eastern Division
	W	L	T	PCT	DIV	PF	PA	STK
New York Yankees	10	3	1	.769	6–0	270	192	W2
Buffalo Bisons	3	10	1	.231	1–5	249	370	L3
Brooklyn Dodgers	3	10	1	.231	2–4	226	339	L6
Miami Seahawks	3	11	0	.214	3–3	167	378	W1

Note: Tie games were not officially counted in the standings.

== Roster ==
1946 New York Yankees final roster
Backs: 60 Lloyd Cheatham FB/DB; 66 Ray Hare FB; 75 Harvey Johnson FB/LB/K; 70 Bob Kennedy LB/FB/P; 76 Pug Manders FB; 61 Bob Morrow FB; 88 Ace Parker RB/DB/P; 83 Bob Perina DB/RB/P; 72 Eddie Prokop RB/DB; 81 Spec Sanders RB/DB/P; 80 Bob Sweiger DB/RB; 87 Lowell Wagner RB/DB	Linemen/Linebackers: 21 Jack Baldwin G; 45 Roman Bentz T/G/DG; 43 Nate Johnson T/DT; 30 Mike Karmazin DG/G; 44 Bruiser Kinard T/DT; 31 George Kinard DG/G; 46 Harley McCollum T/DT; 40 Derrell Palmer T/DT; 41 Roman Piskor G/DG; 35 Charley Riffle G/DG; 22 Tom Robertson C/LB; 25 Lou Sossamon LB/C; 32 Joe Yackanich DG/G	Ends/Receivers: 51 Bruce Alford; 50 Harry Burrus DB; 52 Mel Conger; 55 Bob Masterson; 53 Jack Russell; 57 Perry Schwartz; 56 Hank Stanton; Reserve: 73 Dewey Proctor FB/LB (IR); 77 Frank Sinkwich RB (IR); rookies in italics
