= Tom Mikula =

American football player (1926–2014)

Profile
- Position: Running back

Personal information
- Born: September 26, 1926; Johnstown, Pennsylvania, U.S.
- Died: March 24, 2014 (aged 87); Williamsburg, Virginia, U.S.
- Listed height: 5 ft 10 in (1.78 m)
- Listed weight: 200 lb (91 kg)

Career information
- College: William & Mary
- NFL draft: 1948

Career history
- Brooklyn Dodgers (1948)

Career NFL statistics
- Games played: 1
- Stats at Pro Football Reference

Thomas Michael Mikula (September 26, 1926 – March 24, 2014) was an American professional football player for the All-America Football Conference's Brooklyn Dodgers. He played running back in one game during the 1948 season. Mikula played college football at William & Mary as a walk-on. He died at the age of 87 in 2014.
