= Amos Harris =

American football player (1921–2007)

No. 37
- Position: Guard

Personal information
- Born: May 11, 1921
- Died: August 29, 2007 (aged 86)
- Listed height: 5 ft 11 in (1.80 m)
- Listed weight: 175 lb (79 kg)

Career information
- High school: Gulf Coast Military Academy (MS)
- College: Mississippi State

Career history
- Brooklyn Dodgers (1947–1948)

Career statistics
- Games: 28
- Stats at Pro Football Reference

Edwin Amos "Mike" Harris (August 15, 1921 – August 29, 2007) was an American football player who played at the guard position on both offense and defense. He played college football for Mississippi State in 1942, 1945, and 1946, and professional football for the Brooklyn Dodgers in 1947 and 1948.

== Early life ==
Harris was born in 1921 and attended the Gulf Coast Military Academy in Gulfport, Mississippi.

== College football and military service ==
Harris played one season of college football at Mississippi State in 1942 before being called into military service during World War II. After the war, he returned to Mississippi State for the 1945 and 1946 seasons. He was named to the All-Southwestern Conference football team in 1946.

== Professional football ==
He was selected by the New York Giants in the ninth round (75th overall pick) of the 1946 NFL draft but did not play for the Giants. He played professional football in the All-America Football Conference (AAFC) for the Brooklyn Dodgers during their 1947 and 1948 seasons. He appeared in 27 or 28 games with the Dodgers.

== Later life ==
He died in 2007 at age 86.
