= Ted Scruggs =

American football player (1923–2000)

No. 50
- Position: End

Personal information
- Born: April 18, 1923; Houston, Texas, U.S.
- Died: November 30, 2000 (aged 77); Houston, Texas, U.S.
- Listed height: 6 ft 1 in (1.85 m)
- Listed weight: 195 lb (88 kg)

Career information
- High school: Stephen F. Austin (Houston)
- College: Rice (1940-1942, 1946)
- NFL draft: 1946: 6th round, 44th overall pick

Career history
- Brooklyn Dodgers (1947–1948)

Career AAFC statistics
- Receptions: 3
- Receiving yards: 17
- Stats at Pro Football Reference

Edwin Theodore Scruggs II (April 18, 1923 – November 30, 2000) was an American football player who played at the end position on both offense and defense. He played college football for Rice in 1941, 1942, and 1946 and professional football for the Brooklyn Dodgers in 1947 and 1948.

== Early life ==
Scruggs was born in 1923 in Houston. He attended Stephen F. Austin High School.

== College football and military service ==
Scruggs played college football for Rice in 1941, 1942, and 1946. He left school in 1943 to work for the Houston Shipbuilding Company. He subsequently served in the United States Navy during World War II. After the war, he returned to Rice and helped lead the 1946 Rice Owls football team to a Southwest Conference championship and a victory over Tennessee in the 1947 Orange Bowl.

== Professional football ==
He was selected by the Chicago Bears in the sixth round (44th overall pick) of the 1946 NFL draft but did not play for the Bears. He played professional football in the All-America Football Conference (AAFC) for the Brooklyn Dodgers during their 1947 and 1948 seasons. He appeared in 26 games for the Dodgers.

== Later life ==
Scruggs died in 2000, at age 77, in Houston.
