= Tex Warrington =

American football player (1921–1983)

No. 20, 30
- Positions: Guard, center, linebacker

Personal information
- Born: March 21, 1921; Dover, Delaware, U.S.
- Died: September 21, 1983 (aged 62); Ft. Pierce, Florida, U.S.
- Listed height: 6 ft 2 in (1.88 m)
- Listed weight: 210 lb (95 kg)

Career information
- High school: Dover; Bordentown Military Institute (Bordentown, New Jersey)
- College: William & Mary (1940-1942); Auburn (1944)
- NFL draft: 1944: 9th round, 87th overall pick

Career history
- Brooklyn Dodgers (1946–1948)

Awards and highlights
- First-team All-American (1944); First-team All-SEC (1944)

Career AAFC statistics
- Games played: 39
- Games started: 26
- Stats at Pro Football Reference

Caleb Van "Tex" Warrington Jr. (March 21, 1921 – September 21, 1983) was an American professional football player for the All-America Football Conference (AAFC)'s Brooklyn Dodgers. He played in 39 games between 1946 and 1948 after his collegiate career at William & Mary (1942) and Auburn (1944). In 1978, he was inducted into the Delaware Sports Hall of Fame.
