= Russ Morrow =

American football player (1924–2004)

No. 21
- Position: Center

Personal information
- Born: January 17, 1924; St. Louis, Missouri, U.S.
- Died: May 2, 2004 (aged 80); Smoke Rise, Alabama, U.S.
- Listed height: 6 ft 7 in (2.01 m)
- Listed weight: 210 lb (95 kg)

Career information
- High school: Roosevelt (St. Louis)
- College: Tennessee (1944-1945)
- NFL draft: 1945: 24th round, 247th overall pick

Career history
- Brooklyn Dodgers (1946-1947)

Career AAFC statistics
- Games played: 10
- Games started: 2
- Stats at Pro Football Reference

Russell Lee "Red" Morrow (January 17, 1924 – May 2, 2004) was an American football center.

Morrow was born in St. Louis in 1924 and attended Roosevelt High School. He played college football at the center position for the Tennessee during the 1944 and 1945 seasons. He also served as a West Knoxville police officer while playing for Tennessee in 1945.

Morrow was drafted 247th overall by the Detroit Lions in the 24th round of the 1945 NFL draft but never played for the Lions. Instead, he signed in June 1946 with the Brooklyn Dodgers of the All-America Football Conference. He played for the Dodgers during the 1946 and 1947 seasons. He scored a touchdown for the Dodgers on September 8, 1946. He appeared in a total of 10 professional football games, two of them as a starter. He also played for the Charlotte Clippers of the Dixie Football League from 1947 to 1949.

Morrow later worked for 12 years for Steel City Oldsmobile in Birmingham, Alabama. Morrow died at age 84 in 2004 in Smoke Rise, Alabama.
