= Garland Williams =

American football player (1921–1989)

- Bulldog Williams, 1946

No. 44
- Position: Tackle

Personal information
- Born: August 21, 1921; Parkin, Arkansas, U.S.
- Died: April 7, 1989 (aged 67); Alpharetta, Georgia, U.S.
- Listed height: 6 ft 3 in (1.91 m)
- Listed weight: 220 lb (100 kg)

Career information
- High school: Forrest City (Forrest City, Arkansas)
- College: Georgia (1942, 1946); Duke (1943)
- NFL draft: 1945: 28th round, 286th overall pick

Career history
- Brooklyn Dodgers (1947-1948); Chicago Hornets (1949)

Career AAFC statistics
- Games played: 26
- Games started: 17
- Stats at Pro Football Reference

Garland Hare "Bulldog" Williams (August 21, 1921 – April 7, 1989) was an American professional football player who played at the tackle position on both offense and defense. He played college football for Duke and Georgia and professional football for the Brooklyn Dodgers in 1947 and 1948 and the Chicago Hornets in 1949.

== Early life ==
Williams was born in 1921 in Parkin, Arkansas. He attended Forrest City High School in Arkansas.

== College football and military service ==
Williams played college football at Duke and Georgia. He also served in the United States Marine Corps during World War II.

== Professional football ==
He was drafted by the Brooklyn Dodgers in the seventh round (51st overall pick) of the 1947 AAFC Draft. He played for the Dodgers during their 1947 and 1948 seasons, appearing in a total of 26 games. He also appeared in one game for the Chicago Hornets in 1949.

== Later life ==
In 1989, Williams died at age 67 after a heart attack at Alpharetta, Georgia.
