= 1946 AAFC season =

American football league season

AAFC teams: West, East

The 1946 AAFC season was the first season of the All-America Football Conference, a new professional league established to challenge the market dominance of the established National Football League. The league included eight teams, broken up into Eastern and Western divisions, which played a 14-game official schedule, culminating in a league championship game.

The season is significant for its shattering of the color line in the ranks of professional American football, when black athletes Marion Motley and Bill Willis took to the field for the AAFC's Cleveland Browns on September 9, 1946. Both of these stars would later be voted to membership in the Professional Football Hall of Fame.

== Background ==
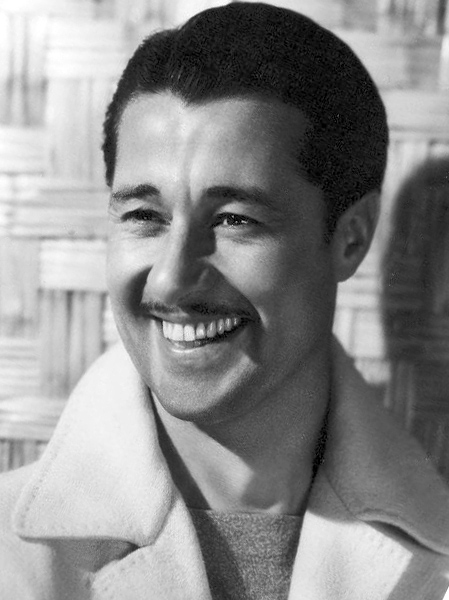
Radio and film star Don Ameche was the co-owner of the AAFC's Los Angeles franchise, the Los Angeles Dons.

In September 1944, Arch Ward, sports columnist for the prestigious Chicago Tribune and father ten years earlier of the college all-star football game, presided over two days of meetings in Chicago to finalize his plan for a new American football league. Over the course of several previous months, Ward had garnered financial commitments for franchise ownership from a circle of interested wealthy investors. Teams were already sponsored for seven cities, with the ownership groups including several individuals of national prominence, such as former heavyweight boxing champion Gene Tunney in Baltimore, film star Don Ameche in Los Angeles, and Eleanor Gehrig, widow of Yankee baseball great Lou Gehrig, in New York City. Plans were announced for a launch in the fall of 1945.

The new football league planned to emulate the situation existing in professional baseball, in which two parallel and equal leagues emerged and came to work in close cooperation. The new league, to be called the All-America Football Conference, tapped former Notre Dame legend Jim Crowley as its commissioner, signing the former collegiate teammate of NFL commissioner Elmer Layden to a lucrative five-year contract worth $125,000 and began signing players and fielding additional applications for team charters.

Seven coaches and about 30 players were signed before league owners decided that wartime manpower shortages and the inability of several teams to expeditiously obtain stadium leases would force a postponement until the fall of 1946.

An additional franchise was added, bringing the total to eight, and a schedule was issued — a round-robin format in which every team in the league played every other team in the league twice on a home-and-away basis. The new league prepared for its launch on September 6, 1946.

== Team alignment ==
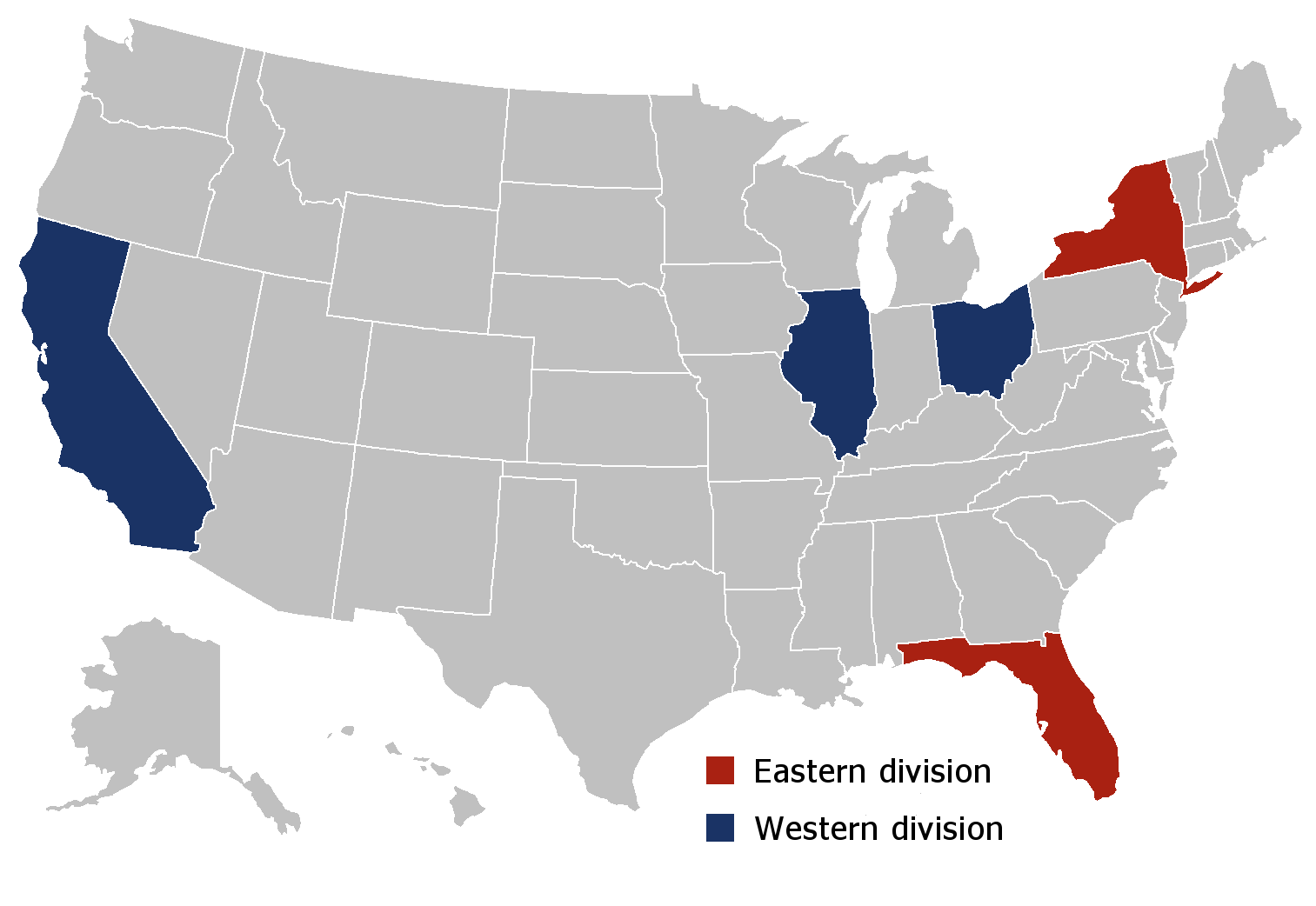
1946 season teams

The AAFC was divided into two divisions of four teams, split "Eastern" and "Western" on a geographic basis.

Several of the league's teams played on fields also used by Major League Baseball teams and even made use of baseball team names, including the Brooklyn Dodgers of Ebbets Field, who did battle with the New York Yankees, playing their games at Yankee Stadium.

With two franchises in California, the AAFC broke new ground as the leading purveyor of professional sports on the Pacific coast, being joined for the 1946 season by the NFL champion Cleveland Rams, which were then relocating to Los Angeles.

=== Divisional alignment, stadiums and coaches ===
Eastern Division	Stadium	Owners	Coach
Buffalo Bisons	Civic Stadium†	James Breuil	Red Dawson
Brooklyn Dodgers	Ebbets Field	William D. Cox and Gerald Smith	Mal Stevens, Tom Scott (interim), Cliff Battles
New York Yankees	Yankee Stadium	Dan Topping	Ray Flaherty
Miami Seahawks	Burdine Stadium‡	Harvey Hester	Jack Meagher and Hamp Pool

Western Division	Stadium	Owners	Coach
San Francisco 49ers	Kezar Stadium	Tony Morabito	Buck Shaw
Los Angeles Dons	Los Angeles Memorial Coliseum	Benjamin Lindheimer	Dudley DeGroot
Chicago Rockets	Soldier Field	John L. Keeshan	Dick Hanley, Pat Boland, Bob Dove, Ned Mathews, and Willie Wilkin
Cleveland Browns	Cleveland Municipal Stadium	Mickey McBride	Paul Brown

† — Better known as War Memorial Stadium, also the first home of the NFL's Buffalo Bills.

‡ — Later known as the Miami Orange Bowl.

== Preseason ==
The fledgling AAFC played a total of 7 preseason games in 1946, spaced over a three-week period, with the first exhibition game taking place August 18 in Portland, Oregon, where the Brooklyn Dodgers and the Chicago Rockets battled to a 14-14 tie. Brooklyn would lead the league with three preseason games played; other clubs such as Miami, Buffalo, and Cleveland, would only play a single exhibition contest.

Five of the seven preseason contests took place on the West coast, with contests in Portland, Spokane, San Diego, San Francisco, and Los Angeles. The two games taking place in the Eastern time zone were held at neutral locations, apparently as a means of broadening potential fan interest, with the Cleveland Browns stopping Brooklyn by a score of 35-20 in Akron, Ohio, and the Buffalo Bisons edging the Miami Seahawks, 23-21, in Baltimore.

== Regular season ==
=== Week One ===
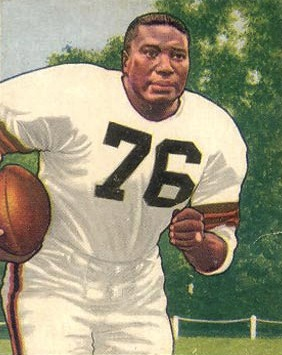
In addition to his role shattering the color barrier, powerful Cleveland fullback and linebacker Marion Motley was the AAFC's first black star.

The 1946 regular season of the All-America Football Conference kicked off the night of Friday, September 6 at Cleveland's Municipal Stadium, where the Cleveland Browns — a team which featured two African-American players, Marion Motley and Bill Willis — hosted the visiting Miami Seahawks. The game, attended by a massive crowd of 60,135, was the largest ever to see a regularly scheduled professional football game. The result was never in doubt, as the Paul Brown-coached Browns, led by quarter back Otto Graham annihilated the hapless Seahawks by a score of 44-0.

The week continued with two games on Sunday, September 9, with the San Francisco 49ers giving up an early lead and falling to the visiting New York Yankees, 21-7, in front of about 35,000 people at Kezar Stadium. In game two, single wing half back Glenn Dobbs passed for one touchdown and lateraled for another midway through a 58-yard scoring run as the visiting Brooklyn Dodgers topped the Buffalo Bisons, 27-14, in front of Commissioner Jim Crowley and a crowd of 25,489 at Buffalo's Civic Stadium. Chicago and Los Angeles had first week byes.

=== Week Two ===
A four-game slate began with two Friday night tilts on September 13, with the Cleveland Browns giving up their first points of the season in the fourth quarter of a 20-6 drubbing of the Chicago Rockets in front of 51,962 fans at Chicago's Soldier Field. Scoring was opened with a 20-yard run by the Brown's powerful running back Marion Motley, with Lou Groza adding two field goals and two PATs, running his season scoring total to 22 points. Game two was a lightly attended contest in the massive Los Angeles Memorial Coliseum, in which the Los Angeles Dons managed to hold on for a 20-14 win over the visiting Brooklyn Dodgers in front of an announced attendance of 19,500.

On Sunday, 40,606 fans turned out to Yankee Stadium to watch their New York Yankees win a sloppy, turnover-plagued contest over the visiting Buffalo Bisons. A Yankee fumble in the red zone was run back 95 yards for a touchdown by Buffalo's Al Vandeweghe. Despite substantially outgaining Buffalo over the course of the game, it took two touchdowns in the final quarter for the Yankees to achieve a come-from-behind win. In the second Sunday game, Frankie Albert and the San Francisco 49ers made the Miami Seahawks the league's first 0-2 team with a 21-14 victory in front of a reported 25,000 people at Kezar Stadium.

=== Week Three ===
The league once again split its action between Friday and Sunday in week 3, with the Chicago Rockets salvaging a 17-17 tie with the Yankees thanks to a 36-yard touchdown pass from QB Walt Williams to halfback Bill Boedeker with just 55 seconds remaining. In game 2, about 23,000 fans made their way to the LA Coliseum to see the Dons run their record to 2-0 in a 30-14 victory over the Miami Seahawks. Despite the lopsided final score, the game was close at halftime, with Miami hitting the locker room holding a 14-10 lead. Twenty unanswered points in the second half, with the Dons' Charlie O'Rourke finishing the game with three touchdown passes as part of his 9-17 throwing effort.

On Sunday, September 22, the mighty Cleveland Browns went to Buffalo and took no prisoners in a 28-0 shutout that was virtually beyond doubt by the end of the first quarter. Cleveland star Otto Graham threw for two more touchdowns, including a 33-yard strike to Marion Motley out of the backfield, as the Browns cruised to their third straight victory. The Browns allowed just six points in their first three games, establishing themselves as the team to beat in the AAFC in 1946. In game 2, 35,000 people turned out at Kezar Stadium to watch Frankie Albert throw for two touchdowns and run for one more as part of a 32-13 disassembling of the visiting Brooklyn Dodgers. The Niners moved their season record to 2-1.

=== Week Four ===
The AAFC held its first Wednesday night contest to kick off week 4, drawing 20,768 fans to Soldier Field to witness an offensive shootout, won by the home team Chicago Rockets over the visiting Buffalo Bisons, 38-35. A fourth quarter rally with 17 unanswered point was needed for the Rockets to escape with the narrow win, won with a walk-off chip-shot field goal by Steve Nemeth. The game was marked by the acrimonious departure of head coach Dick Hanley, who watched the game from the stands after leaving the team owing to personal disagreements with owner John L. Keeshin.

With Brooklyn and Miami on the bye, both the Rockets and the Bisons were needed to play again on Sunday, Sept. 29, just four days later. The previously 0-4 Bisons managed a tie with the visiting Los Angeles Dons, 21-21, while the Rockets played another home game, winning twice in a single week with a 24-7 dispatching of the 49ers. In the final game of the week, the New York Yankees more than doubled the season points allowed total of the Cleveland Browns, scoring a first quarter touchdown en route to a 24-7 loss. The Browns went to 4-0 on the year in the victory.

=== Week Five ===
The fifth week of the AAFC's inaugural season opened with a pair of Friday night games. In the first, the visiting New York Yankees began to exert Eastern Division dominance with a 21–13 victory over the Buffalo Bisons in front of more than 17,000 fans. Yankee rookie Spec Sanders, league leader in total offense, led the team to victory with a pair of fourth quarter scores — a touchdown pass and a 76-yard punt return to the house. In the second game, the Los Angeles Dons scored 21 unanswered points after halftime to notch a come-from-behind 21–9 victory over the Chicago Rockets at Soldier Field.

Only one game took place on Sunday, October 6, in which the Cleveland Browns extended their unbeaten record to five games with an easy 26–7 victory over the Brooklyn Dodgers in front of 43,713 of the home faithful. The league's first foray into football in the Deep South, a Tuesday tilt between the Seahawks and the visiting San Francisco 49ers was a debacle, with only 7,621 fans passing through the turnstiles to watch the dismantling of the home team by a score of 34–7.

=== 1946 AAFC final standings ===
W = Wins, L = Losses, T = Ties, Pct. = Winning Percentage
PF = Points Scored For, PA = Point Scored Against

AAFC Eastern Division
	W	L	T	PCT	DIV	PF	PA	STK
New York Yankees	10	3	1	.769	6–0	270	192	W2
Buffalo Bisons	3	10	1	.231	1–5	249	370	L3
Brooklyn Dodgers	3	10	1	.231	2–4	226	339	L6
Miami Seahawks	3	11	0	.214	3–3	167	378	W1

Note: Tie games were not officially counted in the standings.

AAFC Western Division
	W	L	T	PCT	DIV	PF	PA	STK
Cleveland Browns	12	2	0	.857	4–2	423	137	W5
San Francisco 49ers	9	5	0	.643	4–2	307	189	W3
Los Angeles Dons	7	5	2	.583	2–3–1	305	290	T1
Chicago Rockets	5	6	3	.455	1–4–1	263	315	T1

Note: Tie games were not officially counted in the standings.

== Championship game ==
Cleveland 14, New York 9 (December 22 @ Cleveland)

== League leaders, awards, and achievements ==
Glenn Dobbs led the league in passing yards (1,886), pass completions (135), total offense (2,094 yards), and punting (80 punts averaging 47.8 yards)

Otto Graham led in passing efficiency (51.7) and touchdown passes (17).

Spec Sanders led the league in rushing (709 on 140 carries for a 5.06 yard average).

Lou Groza led in scoring with 84 points and also set a professional football record with 13 field goals and 45 extra points.

Tommy Colella of Cleveland led the league with 10 interceptions for 110 yards.

== 1946 All-AAFC teams ==
The United Press (UP) selected an All-AAFC team in December 1946. The AAFC also announced an official All-AAFC team in January based on polling of reporters and broadcasters in member cities. The Associated Press (AP) selected an All-Pro team that included selections from both the NFL and the AAFC.

Three players received first-team honors on all three teams: tackle Bruiser Kinard and halfbacks Glenn Dobbs and Spec Sanders. A complete list of AAFC players receiving honors is as follows:

=== Ends ===
- Alyn Beals, San Francisco (AAFC-1, UP-1)
- Dante Lavelli, Cleveland (AAFC-1, UP-2, AP-2)
- Mac Speedie, Cleveland (AAFC-2, UP-1)
- Jack Russell, New York (AAFC-2, AP-2)
- Joe Aguirre, Los Angeles (UP-2)

=== Tackles ===
- Bruiser Kinard, New York (AAFC-1, UP-1, AP-1)
- Martin Ruby, Brooklyn (AAFC-1, UP-1, AP-2)
- Lee Artoe, Los Angeles (AAFC-2, UP-2)
- Lou Groza, Cleveland (UP-2)
- Bob Reinhard, Los Angeles (AAFC-2)

=== Guards ===
- Bill Radovich, Los Angeles (AAFC-2, UP-1, AP-1)
- Bruno Banducci, San Francisco (AAFC-1, UP-1, AP-2)
- Bill Willis, Cleveland (AAFC-1)
- Buddy Jungmichel, Miami (AAFC-2, UP-2)
- Ed Ulinski, Cleveland (UP-2)

=== Centers ===
- Bob Nelson, Los Angeles (AAFC-1, UP-1, AP-2)
- Mike Scarry, Cleveland (AAFC-2, UP-2)

=== Quarterbacks ===
- Otto Graham, Cleveland (AAFC-1, UP-1)
- Frankie Albert, San Francisco (AAFC-2, UP-2, AP-2)

=== Halfbacks ===
- Glenn Dobbs, Brooklyn (AAFC-1, UP-1, AP-1)
- Spec Sanders, New York (AAFC-1, UP-1, AP-1)
- Bob Hoernschemeyer, Chicago (AAFC-2, UP-2)
- Steve Juzwik, Buffalo (AAFC-2)
- Ace Parker, New York (UP-2)

=== Fullbacks ===
- Marion Motley, Cleveland (AAFC-1, UP-1, AP-2)
- Norm Standlee, San Francisco, (AAFC-2, UP-2)
