= Harry Buffington =

American football player, coach, and scout (1919–2003)

No. 52, 33
- Position: Guard

Personal information
- Born: August 27, 1919; Pryor Creek, Oklahoma, U.S.
- Died: November 19, 2003 (aged 84); Lubbock, Texas, U.S.
- Listed height: 6 ft 0 in (1.83 m)
- Listed weight: 206 lb (93 kg)

Career information
- High school: Pryor Creek (OK)
- College: Oklahoma A&M

Career history
- New York Giants (1942); Brooklyn Dodgers (1946–1948)
- Stats at Pro Football Reference

Harry Webster Buffington (August 27, 1919 – November 19, 2003) was an American football guard, coach, and scout. He played for the New York Giants in 1942 and for the Brooklyn Dodgers from 1946 to 1948. He attended and played college football for Oklahoma A&M (now Oklahoma State).

== Career ==
At Oklahoma A&M, Buffington played quarterback and running back. In 1941, with news of his teammates joining the military, reports surfaced of Buffington expressing interest in the Royal Canadian Air Force, though he instead joined the Giants in the National Football League in 1942. Although he started the season as the third-string halfback, he was moved to guard in October after executing a block on a Philadelphia Eagles defender that sent him into Giants head coach Steve Owen; impressed, Owen changed his position to fill in for the injured Monk Edwards.

Buffington served as a Flying Cadet in the Special Services during World War II. Upon returning from the war, he signed with the Dodgers of the All-America Football Conference. In a 1947 game against the newly-formed Baltimore Colts, he drew attention for a major error on the opening kickoff: after teammate Elmore Harris fumbled, Buffington was spun around while blocking before spotting the ball and recovering. However, the spin confused him and caused him to start running towards his own end zone. Upon realizing his mistake as he crossed the goal line, he tried to lateral to teammate Mickey Colmer, but the ball was batted down and recovered by Baltimore's Jim Castiglia for a touchdown. The Dodgers lost 16–7, rendering Buffington's gaffe irrelevant to the final score.

After ending his playing career, he returned to Oklahoma A&M and graduate with a master's degree in education. He later became a coach for his alma mater, Austin College, Texas Tech, and the Canadian Football League's Edmonton Eskimos. Buffington also worked as a scout for the Giants, and was named director of National Football Scouting, Inc. in 1965.
