= Harry Burrus =

American football player (1921–2004)

- Harry Burrus, c. 1966

No. 50, 83, 54
- Positions: Halfback, End

Personal information
- Born: April 6, 1921; Slaton, Texas, U.S.
- Died: September 20, 2004 (aged 83); Winter Haven, Florida, U.S.
- Listed height: 6 ft 1 in (1.85 m)
- Listed weight: 195 lb (88 kg)

Career information
- High school: Big Spring (Big Spring, Texas)
- College: Hardin–Simmons (1938-1941)
- NFL draft: 1942: 6th round, 50th overall pick

Career history
- New York Yankees (1946-1947); Chicago Cardinals (1948); Brooklyn Dodgers (1948)

Career AAFC statistics
- Receptions: 28
- Receiving yards: 670
- Touchdowns: 4
- Stats at Pro Football Reference

Harry Clifton Burrus Jr. (April 6, 1921 – September 20, 2004) was an American professional football halfback.

Burrus was born in Texas in 1921 and attended Big Spring High School in Big Spring, Texas, graduating in 1937. He played college football at Hardin–Simmons, graduating in 1941. While at Hardin-Simmons, he was selected as a Little All-American.

During World War II, he served in the Army Air Force, attained the rank of captain, and played on the Randolph Field Ramblers football team.

He played professional football in the All-America Football Conference (AAFC) for the New York Yankees in 1946 and 1947 and for the Chicago Cardinals and Brooklyn Dodgers in 1948. He appeared in 38 professional football games, nine of them as a starter, and tallied 28 receptions for 670 yards and four touchdowns.

In 1949, he was hired by Washington University in St. Louis as an assistant professor of physical education and assistant football coach for the Washington University Bears. He became athletic director at Washington University in 1958. He left Washington University in 1966 for a post at Parsons College. He served as the tennis coach at Parsons.

He died in 2004 in Winter Haven, Florida.
