= 1946 Buffalo Bisons season =

American football team season

- Head coach: Red Dawson
- Home stadium: Civic Stadium

Results
- Record: 3–10–1
- Division place: T-2nd AAFC East
- Playoffs: did not qualify

The 1946 Buffalo Bisons season was their inaugural season in the All-America Football Conference. The team finished 3-10-1, failing to qualify for the playoffs.

The team's statistical leaders included quarterback George Terlep with 574 passing yards, fullback Vic Kulbitski with 605 rushing yards, and end Fay King with 466 receiving yards. Right halfback Steve Juzwik and fullback Lou Zontini tied for the team scoring lead with 42 points each.

== Season schedule ==
Week	Date	Opponent	Result	Record	Venue	Recap
1	September 8	**Brooklyn Dodgers**	**L** 14–27	0–1	Civic Stadium	Recap
2	September 14	at **New York Yankees**	**L** 10–21	0–2	Yankee Stadium	Recap
3	September 22	Cleveland Browns	**L** 0–28	0–3	Civic Stadium	Recap
3	September 25	at Chicago Rockets	**L** 28–35	0–4	Soldier Field	Recap
4	September 29	Los Angeles Dons	**T** 21–21	0–4–1	Civic Stadium	Recap
5	October 4	**New York Yankees**	**L** 13–21	0–5–1	Civic Stadium	Recap
6	October 11	**Miami Seahawks**	**L** 14–17	0–6–1	Civic Stadium	Recap
7	October 19	San Francisco 49ers	**W** 17–14	1–6–1	Civic Stadium	Recap
8	October 27	Chicago Rockets	**W** 49–17	2–6–1	Civic Stadium	Recap
9	November 2	at San Francisco 49ers	**L** 14–27	2–7–1	Kezar Stadium	Recap
10	November 10	at **Brooklyn Dodgers**	**W** 17–14	3–7–1	Ebbets Field	Recap
11	November 18	at **Miami Seahawks**	**L** 14–21	3–8–1	Miami Orange Bowl	Recap
12	November 24	at Cleveland Browns	**L** 17–42	3–9–1	Cleveland Municipal Stadium	Recap
13	December 1	at Los Angeles Dons	**L** 14–62	3–10–1	Los Angeles Memorial Coliseum	Recap
14	Bye					
15	Bye					
Note: Intra-division opponents are in **bold** text.

== Division standings ==
AAFC Eastern Division
	W	L	T	PCT	DIV	PF	PA	STK
New York Yankees	10	3	1	.769	6–0	270	192	W2
Buffalo Bisons	3	10	1	.231	1–5	249	370	L3
Brooklyn Dodgers	3	10	1	.231	2–4	226	339	L6
Miami Seahawks	3	11	0	.214	3–3	167	378	W1

Note: Tie games were not officially counted in the standings.

== Roster ==
1946 Buffalo Bison final roster
Backs: 81 Blondy Black FB/LB; 60 Al Dekdebrun CB/QB; 80 Andy Dudish RB; 84 Pres Johnston RB/CB/P; 88 Steve Juzwik RB/S; 72 Vic Kulbitski LB/FB; 89 Chet Mutryn RB/CB; 85 Curt Sandig RB/CB; 61 Ken Stofer CB/RB; 62 George Terlep QB/S; 73 Jim Thibaut FB; 87 Lou Tomasetti S/RB; 71 Lou Zontini FB/LB/K/P	Linemen/Linebackers: 44 George Doherty T/DT; 40 Chubby Grigg T; 34 Elmer Jones DG/G; 36 Al Klug T/G; 43 Jack Kramer DT/T; 31 Hal Lahar DG/G; 41 John Matisi DT/T; 33 John Perko G/DG; 30 Rocco Pirro G/DG; 21 Felto Prewitt LB/C; 42 Ben Pucci T; 46 C. B. Stanley T/DT; 70 Roy Stuart LB	Ends/Receivers: 52 Marty Comer; 50 Jack Duggar; 53 Ray Ebli; 51 Fay King; 56 Nick Klutka; 55 Herb Nelson; 54 Ralph Schilling; Reserve: 25 Sam Brazinsky LB/C (IR); 53 Al Vandeweghe E (IR); rookies in italics
