= Joe Spencer (American football) =

American football player and coach (1923–1996)

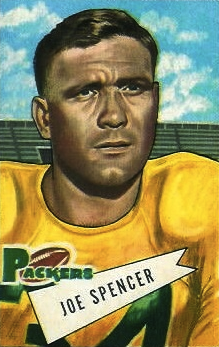
- Spencer on a 1952 Bowman football card

No. 40, 42, 49, 34
- Position: Tackle

Personal information
- Born: August 15, 1923; Cleveland County, Oklahoma, U.S.
- Died: October 24, 1996 (aged 73); Houston, Texas, U.S.
- Listed height: 6 ft 3 in (1.91 m)
- Listed weight: 239 lb (108 kg)

Career information
- High school: Capitol Hill (Oklahoma City, Oklahoma)
- College: Oklahoma State (1942, 1946-1947)
- NFL draft: 1945: 19th round, 195th overall pick

Career history

Playing
- Brooklyn Dodgers (1948); Cleveland Browns (1949); Green Bay Packers (1950–1951)

Coaching
- Austin College (1953–1954) Assistant; Austin College (1955–1960) Head coach; Houston Oilers (1961–1965) Offensive line; Edmonton Eskimos (1966–1967) Assistant; New York Jets (1968–1970) Offensive line; St. Louis Cardinals (1971) Offensive line; Kansas (1972–1973) Offensive line; Chicago Fire (1974) Assistant; Kansas City Chiefs (1975–1980) Offensive line; New Orleans Saints (1981–1982) Offensive line; New Orleans Saints (1983–1985) Quarterback

Awards and highlights
- As player: AAFC champion (1949); As coach: AFL champion (1961); Super Bowl champion (III)

Career NFL/AAFC statistics
- Games played: 48
- Games started: 20
- Interceptions: 1
- Stats at Pro Football Reference

Joseph Emerson Spencer (August 15, 1923 – October 24, 1996) was an American football tackle and coach who played in the All-America Football Conference (AAFC) and the National Football League (NFL). He was a member of the Brooklyn Dodgers in 1948 and the Cleveland Browns in 1949 before playing two seasons with the Green Bay Packers.

Spencer grew up in Oklahoma and played college football at Oklahoma State before serving in the U.S. Army during World War II. He returned to finish his college career in 1946, and the following year was selected to play in the annual East-West college all-star game. After graduating, Spencer played for the Dodgers and Browns in the AAFC, and the Packers in the NFL. After retiring as a player, Spencer started a coaching career in 1953 as an assistant at Austin College. He was the school's head coach between 1955 and 1960. He then became the offensive line coach for the Houston Oilers, who won the American Football League (AFL) championship in 1961. He later served as an assistant coach with a variety of other AFL and NFL teams, including the 1968 New York Jets team that won Super Bowl III. Spencer died of cancer in 1996. He is a member of Austin College's athletics hall of fame; the school also named its coaching lifetime achievement award after him.

== Early life and college ==
Spencer was born on August 15, 1923, in Cleveland County, Oklahoma, and attended Capitol Hill High School in Oklahoma City, where he played high school football for three years. After graduating, he enrolled at Oklahoma State University and played on the school's football team starting in 1942. After his first season, however, Spencer left Oklahoma to serve in the U.S. Army during World War II. He was in the Army's 2nd Armored Division and was the player-coach of its football team, which won the European service championship in 1945.

After the war, Spencer returned to Oklahoma State for the 1946 and 1947 seasons. In 1947, he was chosen to play on the West team in the annual East–West Shrine Game, a college all-star game. Spencer had been selected by the Philadelphia Eagles of the National Football League in the 1945 draft, but he signed with the Brooklyn Dodgers of the All-America Football Conference after graduating in 1948.

== Professional career ==
Spencer played as a tackle both on offense and defense for the Dodgers in 1948, playing in 13 games that year; the team finished with a 2–12 win–loss record. As the Dodgers struggled on the field as well as financially, the team was forced to merge with the New York Yankees after the season. That left a number of former Brooklyn players available for other AAFC teams and the Cleveland Browns signed Spencer.

Spencer played for the Browns during the 1949 season, and played in 11 games for the team, which finished with a 9–1–2 record and won the AAFC championship. He was then traded to the Green Bay Packers of the NFL for Gordy Soltau and became defensive captain for the team during his two seasons. He started in all 12 games for the Packers in 1950. In an October 1 game against the Chicago Bears, Spencer made a key block to allow Rebel Steiner to return an interception 94 yards for a touchdown en route to a 31–21 Packers win. In 1951, Spencer was used primarily as a tackle on offense and again played in all 12 games for the Packers that season. Entering the 1952 season, Spencer was the first veteran to sign a new contract for the upcoming year. However, he suffered an injury during preseason and retired from playing the game to move into coaching.

== Coaching career ==
After retiring from football, Spencer began his coaching career. His first job was as an assistant coach at Austin College in Texas starting in 1953. He was promoted to head football coach in 1955 and held that position through the 1960 season. Spencer was hired as an assistant coach for the Houston Oilers in the American Football League (AFL) in 1961. The Oilers, who were coached by fellow former Browns tackle Lou Rymkus when he joined, won the AFL championship that year. The team finished with an 11–3 record the following season but lost the championship game to the Dallas Texans. Spencer stayed with the Oilers until 1965.

Spencer moved to a coaching job with the Edmonton Eskimos of the Canadian Football League in 1966 and 1967. He was then hired in 1968 as the offensive line coach for the AFL's New York Jets, who were led by Weeb Ewbank, one of Spencer's coaches when he played in Cleveland. Led by quarterback Joe Namath, the Jets finished the 1968 regular season with an 11–3 record and beat the heavily favored Baltimore Colts to win Super Bowl III. Spencer stayed with the Jets through the 1970 season.

Spencer became the offensive line coach for the NFL's St. Louis Cardinals in 1971 before taking a similar role in 1972 at the University of Kansas. He coached at Kansas under Don Fambrough through the 1973 season. Spencer's next stop was as an assistant for the World Football League's Chicago Fire in 1974. The Fire disbanded after the season, and Spencer got a job as an assistant with the Kansas City Chiefs, where he coached for six years. He then took a job as an offensive line coach for the New Orleans Saints in 1981. The Saints hired Carl Mauck in 1982 to work with Spencer coaching the linemen and the following year Spencer was moved to quality control coach. He stayed in that role through the 1985 season.

== Later life and death ==
Spencer and his wife, Betty Jo, had two children. In 1997, Austin College established the Coach Joe Spencer Award for Meritorious Service and Lifetime Achievement in Coaching in his honor. The award is given to Austin College alumni and staff who have distinguished athletic coaching careers. Spencer was also inducted into the Austin College Athletic Hall of Honor in 1969. He died of cancer on October 24, 1996, at the age of 73.
