= George Strohmeyer =

American football player (1924–1992)

No. 25
- Positions: Center, linebacker

Personal information
- Born: January 27, 1924; Kansas City, Missouri, U.S.
- Died: January 12, 1992 (aged 67); Hidalgo County, Texas, U.S.
- Listed height: 5 ft 10 in (1.78 m)
- Listed weight: 205 lb (93 kg)

Career information
- High school: McAllen (McAllen, Texas)
- College: Texas A&M; Notre Dame (1946–1947)
- NFL draft: 1946: 13th round, 120th overall pick

Career history
- Brooklyn Dodgers (1948); Chicago Hornets (1949)

Awards and highlights
- Second-team All-AAFC (1948); 2× National champion (1946, 1947); First-team All-American (1946); Third-team All-American (1947)

Career AAFC statistics
- Games played: 26
- Games started: 8
- Interceptions: 7
- Stats at Pro Football Reference

George Ferdinand Strohmeyer, Jr. (January 27, 1924 – January 12, 1992) was an American professional football player who played two seasons in the All-America Football Conference (AAFC) with the Brooklyn Dodgers and Chicago Hornets. He played college football at Texas A&M University and the University of Notre Dame. He was selected by the Los Angeles Rams of the National Football League (NFL) in the thirteenth round of the 1946 NFL draft.

== Early life ==
Strohmeyer played high school football as a center at McAllen High School in McAllen, Texas. He was named Best Blocker on the All-Valley squad in 1941 and was also one of the area's best placekickers. He graduated in 1941. Strohmeyer was also a Golden Gloves champion.

== College career ==
Strohmeyer first played college football as a freshman for the Texas A&M Aggies. He then joined the United States Navy in 1943. He played football on several military bases, earning Service Football All-America honors in 1944 and 1945. Strohmeyer lettered for the Notre Dame Fighting Irish from 1946 to 1947. He also earned All-American honors in 1946 and 1947.

== Professional career ==
Strohmeyer was selected by the Los Angeles Rams of the NFL in the 13th round with the 120th pick in the 1946 NFL draft. He played in fourteen games, starting seven, for the AAFC's Brooklyn Dodgers in 1948 and earned Associated Press Second Team All-AAFC honors. He played in twelve games, starting one, for the Chicago Hornets of the AAFC during the 1949 season.

== Personal life ==
Strohmeyer was inducted into the Rio Grande Valley Sports Hall of Fame in 1990. He became a football coach after his playing career. He had stints at St. Ambrose University, Saint Joseph Academy and other schools.
