= Joe Davis (end) =

American football player (1919–1992)

Profile
- Position: End

Personal information
- Born: November 20, 1919; St. Anthony, Idaho, U.S.
- Died: May 26, 1992 (aged 72); Bakersfield, California, U.S.
- Listed height: 6 ft 2 in (1.88 m)
- Listed weight: 195 lb (88 kg)

Career information
- High school: Bountiful (UT)
- College: USC

Career history
- Brooklyn Dodgers (AAFC) (1946)
- Stats at Pro Football Reference

Joe Austin Davis (November 20, 1919 – May 26, 1992) was an American football end.

Davis was born in Idaho in 1919 and grew up in Bountiful, Utah. At Davis High School, he played fullback for the football team, pitcher for the baseball team, center for the basketball team, and ran the 440 for the track team. He played college football as an end for the USC Trojans.

He served in the United States Navy at the United States Naval Training Center Bainbridge, where he played football for the Bainbridge Commodores.

He played professional football as an end for the Brooklyn Dodgers of the All-America Football Conference in 1946. He appeared in 14 games, 12 as a starter, and caught 22 passes for 337 yards and a touchdown.

He died in 1992 in Bakersfield, California.
