= George Bernhardt =

American football player and coach (1919–1987)

No. 31, 33
- Position: Guard

Personal information
- Born: June 15, 1919; Berwyn, Illinois, U.S.
- Died: December 6, 1987 (aged 68); Garnett, Kansas, U.S.
- Listed height: 5 ft 10 in (1.78 m)
- Listed weight: 213 lb (97 kg)

Career information
- High school: Brookfield (Brookfield, Illinois)
- College: Illinois

Career history

Playing
- Brooklyn Dodgers (AAFC) (1946–1948); Chicago Rockets (1948)

Coaching
- Washburn (1949–1950) Assistant coach; Wichita (1951–1954) Assistant coach; Arkansas (1955–1957) Assistant coach; Kansas (1958–1966) Assistant coach; Vanderbilt (1967–1970) Assistant coach; Kansas (1971–1974) Assistant coach
- Stats at Pro Football Reference

George W. Bernhardt (June 15, 1919 – December 6, 1987) was an American football guard and coach.

Bernhardt was born in Berwyn, Illinois in 1919 and attended Brookfield High School in Brookfield, Illinois. He played college football at Illinois.

He played professional football as a guard in the All-America Football Conference (AAFC) for the Brooklyn Dodgers from 1946 to 1948 and for the Chicago Rockets in 1948. He appeared in 30 games, 24 as a starter.

After retiring as a player, Bernhardt worked as a football coach. He was an assistant football coach at Washburn University from 1949 to 1950, the Municipal University of Wichita—now known as Wichita State University from 1951 to 1954, the University of Arkansas from 1955 to 1957, the University of Kansas from 1958 to 1966, Vanderbilt University from 1967 to 1970, and again at Kansas from 1971 to 1974.

Bernhardt lived in his later years in Lawrence, Kansas. He died in 1987 in an automobile accident at Garnett, Kansas.
