= Ed Gustafson =

American football player (1922–2012)

Profile
- Position: Center/Linebacker

Personal information
- Born: April 4, 1922; Moline, Illinois
- Died: November 25, 2012 (aged 90); Madison, Wisconsin
- Listed height: 6 ft 3 in (1.91 m)
- Listed weight: 205 lb (93 kg)

Career information
- College: George Washington

Career history
- Brooklyn Dodgers (1947–1948)

Awards and highlights
- George Washington HOF (1992)
- Stats at Pro Football Reference

Edsel Warren Gustafson (April 4, 1922 – November 18, 2012) was an American football player. He was president of the Vita Plus Corporation from 1976 to 1986.

Gustafson was born in Moline, Illinois. He was inducted into George Washington University Hall of Fame in 1992.
