= Walt McDonald (American football) =

American football player (1920–2012)

No. 66, 61
- Positions: Defensive back, end

Personal information
- Born: November 5, 1920; Lowellville, Ohio, U.S.
- Died: April 16, 2012 (aged 91); Flagstaff, Arizona, U.S.
- Listed height: 6 ft 1 in (1.85 m)
- Listed weight: 210 lb (95 kg)

Career information
- High school: Struthers (Struthers, Ohio)
- College: Tulane (1939–1942)
- NFL draft: 1943: 10th round, 90th overall pick

Career history
- Miami Seahawks (1946); Brooklyn Dodgers (1946–1948); Chicago Hornets (1949)

Career AAFC statistics
- Interceptions: 5
- Receiving yards: 197
- Touchdowns: 1
- Stats at Pro Football Reference

Walter Vincent McDonald (November 5, 1920 – April 16, 2012) was an American professional football defensive back in the All-America Football Conference (AAFC) for the Miami Seahawks, Brooklyn Dodgers, and the Chicago Hornets. He played college football and college basketball at Tulane University and was drafted in the tenth round of the 1943 NFL draft by the Washington Redskins.
