= Joe Gibson (American football) =

American football player (1919–2002)

Profile
- Position: DB/E

Personal information
- Born: June 28, 1919; Nocona, Texas
- Died: October 19, 2002 (aged 83); Sacramento, California

Career information
- College: Tulsa

Career history
- Cleveland Rams (1942); Washington Redskins (1943); Cleveland Rams (1944); Brooklyn Dodgers (1946–1947)

Career statistics
- Games played-started: 54-18
- Receptions-yards: 6-79
- Interceptions: 1
- Stats at Pro Football Reference

Billy Joe Gibson (June 28, 1919 – October 19, 2002) was an American football defensive back and end in the National Football League for the Cleveland Rams (1942, 1944) and the Washington Redskins (1943). Gibson also played in the All-America Football Conference for the Brooklyn Dodgers. He played college football at the University of Tulsa.
