= Doyle Tackett =

American football player (1923–2002)

- Doyle Tackett, 1946

Profile
- Position: Halfback

Personal information
- Born: August 23, 1923; Hector, Arkansas, U.S.
- Died: September 7, 2002 (aged 79); Atkins, Arkansas, U.S.
- Listed height: 6 ft 0 in (1.83 m)
- Listed weight: 205 lb (93 kg)

Career information
- High school: Atkins (AR)

Career history
- Brooklyn Dodgers (1946-1948)
- Stats at Pro Football Reference

Doyle Lee Tackett (August 23, 1923 – September 7, 2002) was an American football halfback, wingback, and blocking back. He played for the Navy's Fleet City Bluejackets football teams in 1944 and 1945 and for the Brooklyn Dodgers from 1946 to 1948.

== Early life ==
Tackett was born in Hector, Arkansas, in 1923 and attended Atkins High School in Atkins, Arkansas. He received all-state honors while playing football at Atkins High School in 1942. He was a multi-sport athlete in high school, pitching for the baseball team, playing guard for the basketball team, and setting a rreocrd in the discus throw.

== Fleet City ==
Before Tackett was able to play college football, the United States entered World War II, and Tackett joined the Navy. He served in the Navy from June 1943 until February 1946. In 1944 and 1945, he starred at the halfback and fullback positions on the Navy's Fleet City Bluejackets football team in San Francisco. The undefeated 1945 Fleet City Bluejackets football team featured an all-star lineup that included Tackett, Bruiser Kinard, Bill Daddio, Charlie O'Rourke, Steve Juzwik, Lou Zontini, and John Badaczewski, and was considered to be as good as the 1945 Army Cadets football team.

== Brooklyn Dodgers ==
Tackett drew attention from professional scouts while playing for Fleet City and received offers from several professional teams, ultimately accepting an offer from the Brooklyn Dodgers of the All-America Football Conference. He played three seasons for the Dodgers from 1946 to 1948. He began as a blocking back, but was switched to wingback in November 1946. He scored his first professional touchdown on November 10, 1946, on a 40-yard reception from Glenn Dobbs. Dobbs and Tackett connected for a second touchdown one week later on November 17, 1946. Tackett appeared in a total of 27 games, five of them as a starter, and caught 10 passes 216 receiving yards and two touchdowns. He also recorded two interceptions while playing on defense.

== Later life ==
After his football career ended, Tackett returned to Arkansas and worked as a farmer. He was married in 1946 to Margaret Helen Carter. He died in 2002 in Atkins, Arkansas.
