= Jim McCarthy (American football) =

American football player (1920–1991)

Profile
- Position: End

Personal information
- Born: November 28, 1920; Lockport, Illinois, U.S.
- Died: December 2, 1991 (aged 71); Orland Park, Illinois, U.S.
- Listed height: 6 ft 1 in (1.85 m)
- Listed weight: 205 lb (93 kg)

Career information
- High school: Lockport (IL)
- College: Illinois

Career history
- Brooklyn Dodgers (AAFC) (1946-1947); Chicago Rockets (1948); Chicago Hornets (1949)
- Stats at Pro Football Reference

James Patrick McCarthy (November 28, 1920 – December 2, 1991), sometimes known by the nickname "Red", was an American football end and golfer.

McCarthy was born in Lockport, Illinois, in 1920 and attended Lockport High School. He played college football at Illinois in 1941 and 1942. He was also the Big Ten golf champion while at Illinois.

McCarthy served in the United States Marine Corps during World War II. He received the rank of first lieutenant and served in the Marines for 32 months, 24 of them overseas. While stationed in Hawaii, he played several games for the Honolulu Marines football team.

In June 1946, he signed to play professional football in the All-America Football Conference for the Brooklyn Dodgers. He played for the Dodgers during the 1946 and 1947 seasons, appearing in 28 games for the club—26 of them as a starter on offense and defense at left end.

McCarthy was traded by the Dodgers to the Chicago Rockets in March 1948> and the Chicago Hornets in 1949. During his four-year career in professional football, he appeared in 54 games, 35 as a starter, and caught 28 passes for 531 yards and three touchdowns. He also served as a place-kicker and successfully converted 47 extra points and eight field goals. He scored a total of 91 points during his professional football career.

He died in 1991 in Orland Park, Illinois.
