= Jack Russell (gridiron football) =

American football player (1919–2006)

- Russell, c. 1951

No. 53, 16, 29
- Position: End

Personal information
- Born: August 29, 1919; Nemo, Texas, U.S.
- Died: January 16, 2006 (aged 86); Cleburne, Texas, U.S.
- Listed height: 6 ft 1 in (1.85 m)
- Listed weight: 215 lb (98 kg)

Career information
- High school: Cleburne
- College: Baylor (1939–1941)
- NFL draft: 1943: 3rd round, 22nd overall pick

Career history

Playing
- Blackland AAF (1943); Randolph Field (1944); New York Yankees (1946–1949); New York Yanks (1950); Saskatchewan Roughriders (1951–1952)

Coaching
- Saskatchewan Roughriders (1956–1957) Line coach

Awards and highlights
- First-team All-SWC (1940); Second-team All-SWC (1941)

Career NFL/AAFC statistics
- Receptions: 83
- Receiving yards: 1,331
- Total touchdowns: 18
- Stats at Pro Football Reference

James Monroe "Jack" Russell (August 29, 1919 – January 16, 2006) was an American football end.

Russell was born in Nemo, Texas in 1919 and attended Cleburne High School in Cleburne, Texas. He played college football at Baylor. He was drafted by the Pittsburgh Steelers in 1943 but did not play for them. During World War II, he served in the military and played on the 1944 Randolph Field Ramblers football team. In December 1944, he was named to the 1944 All-Service football team by the Associated Press.

After the war, Russell played professional football in the All-America Football Conference (AAFC) for the New York Yankees from 1946 to 1949 and in the National Football League (NFL) for the New York Yanks in 1950. He appeared in 65 professional football games, 56 of them as a starter, and tallied 83 receptions for 1,331 yards and 15 touchdowns. He also played in the Western Interprovincial Football Union for the Saskatchewan Roughriders from 1951 to 1952.

Russell died in 2006, in Cleburne, Texas.
