= Saxon Judd =

American football player (1919–1990)

- Saxon Judd, 1942

No. 53
- Position: End

Personal information
- Born: November 29, 1919; Pottsboro, Texas, U.S.
- Died: March 31, 1990 (aged 70); Tulsa, Oklahoma, U.S.
- Listed height: 6 ft 1 in (1.85 m)
- Listed weight: 190 lb (86 kg)

Career information
- High school: Pottsboro
- College: Tulsa (1941-1942); Louisiana (1943)
- NFL draft: 1944: 3rd round, 17th overall pick

Career history
- Brooklyn Dodgers (1946–1948)

Career AAFC statistics
- Receptions: 84
- Receiving yards: 997
- Receiving touchdowns: 7
- Stats at Pro Football Reference

Saxon Thomas Judd (November 20, 1919 – March 31, 1990) was an American football end. He played college football at the end position for Tulsa in 1941 and 1942 and at Southwest Louisiana Institute in 1942. He also played professional football for the Brooklyn Dodgers from 1946 to 1948.

== Early life ==
Judd was born in Pottsboro, Texas, in 1919, and attended Pottsboro High School in that city.

== College football ==
Judd played college football as end, playing on both offense and defense, for Tulsa in 1941 and 1942. He was the leading receiver for passer Glenn Dobbs on the 1942 Tulsa Golden Hurricane football team that compiled a perfect 10–0 record. He set Tulsa season records in 1942 with 34 receptions and nine receiving touchdowns.

In 1942, Judd entered military service and was assigned to Southwestern Louisiana Institute in Lafayette, Louisiana, where he played college football.

== Professional football ==
He was selected by the Chicago Cardinals in the third round (17th overall pick) of the 1944 NFL draft but did not play in the NFL. He served in the Marines during World War II and saw combat in the Pacific. After the war, he played for the Brooklyn Dodgers of the All-America Football Conference (AAFC) from 1946 to 1948. He appeared in 41 games, 17 as a starter, and caught 84 passes for 997 yards and seven touchdowns.

== Later life ==
Judd worked as a coach for several years after the war. In 1953, he began work for Word Industries in Tulsa. Judd was inducted into the Tulsa University Athletic Hall of Fame in 1986.

After seven weeks of heart illness, Judd died in 1990 at age 70 at his home in Tulsa.
