= Elmore Harris (athlete) =

American football player (1922–1968)

No. 82, 18, 25, 11, 21
- Position: Halfback

Personal information
- Born: June 3, 1922; Huntsville, Alabama, U.S.
- Died: December 8, 1968 (aged 46); New York City, U.S.
- Listed height: 5 ft 11 in (1.80 m)
- Listed weight: 175 lb (79 kg)

Career information
- High school: Dover State (Normal, Alabama)
- College: Morgan State

Career history
- Brooklyn Dodgers (1947); Chicago Rockets (1948)*; Jersey City Giants (1948); New York Bulldogs (1949)*; Paterson Panthers (1949); Jersey City Giants (1949–1950)
- * Offseason or practice squad member only
- Stats at Pro Football Reference

Elmore R. Harris (June 3, 1922 – December 8, 1968) was an American athlete. He won three National Collegiate Athletic Association (NCAA) track championships, and played professional football for the Brooklyn Dodgers of the All-America Football Conference (AAFC). Harris was considered the top choice for the U.S. track team in the 400 metres event at the 1948 Summer Olympics. However, he instead decided to sign with the Dodgers, eliminating himself from Olympic eligibility.

== Early life ==
Elmore R. Harris was born on June 3, 1922, in Huntsville, Alabama. He was a "star" football player at Dover State High School in Normal, Alabama.

== College career ==
Harris participated in track and football at Morgan State College. In 1944, he won the 440-yard run NCAA title and two NCAA titles in the 220-yard low hurdles. He played two years of varsity football for the Morgan State Bears, scoring 37 career touchdowns while earning Negro All-American honors.

== Professional career ==
Harris was considered the top choice for the U.S. track team in the 400 metres event at the 1948 Summer Olympics. However, he instead decided to sign with the Brooklyn Dodgers of the All-America Football Conference (AAFC) for the 1947 season, eliminating himself from Olympic eligibility. He played in ten games, starting two, for the Dodgers in 1947, rushing three times for negative two yards while also returning 14 kicks for 329 yards.

Harris signed with the Chicago Rockets of the AAFC on March 2, 1948, but was released before ever playing for them.

Harris played in all ten games, starting six, for the Jersey City Giants of the American Football League (AFL) in 1948, rushing 51 times for 257 yards and four touchdowns while also catching 15 passes for 260 yards and three touchdowns.

Harris was signed by the New York Bulldogs of the National Football League on June 11, 1949. He was released on September 12, 1949, before the start of the 1949 regular season.

Harris then played in three games, starting one, for the AFL's Paterson Panthers in 1949. On September 21, 1949, he was traded back to the Jersey City Giants for Frank Burns. Harris appeared in five games, starting two, for the Giants during the 1949 season. He also played in three games, starting two, for Jersey City in 1950.

== Personal life ==
Harris was the founder of Olympia Cleaning Corporation in the Bronx. He died of a heart attack on December 8, 1968, in Queen's, New York.
