= Mal Stevens =

American football player, coach, naval officer, and orthopedic surgeon

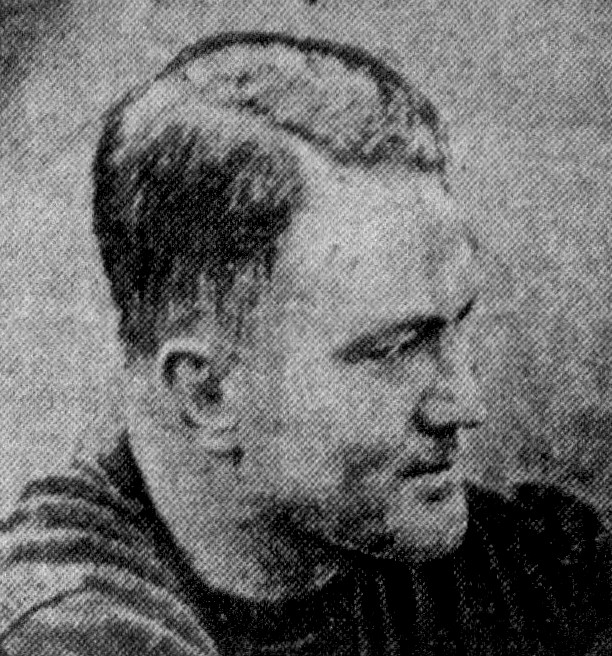
- Stevens, c. 1942

Biographical details
- Born: April 14, 1900; Stockton, Kansas, U.S.
- Died: December 6, 1979 (aged 79); Bronx, New York, U.S.

Playing career
- 1919–1921: Washburn
- 1923: Yale
- Positions: Quarterback, halfback

Coaching career (HC unless noted)
- 1924–1927: Yale (assistant)
- 1928–1932: Yale
- 1933: Yale (freshmen)
- 1934–1941: NYU
- 1943: Sampson NTS
- 1946: Brooklyn Dodgers

Head coaching record
- Overall: 61–47–10 (college); 1–4–1 (AAFC)

Accomplishments and honors

Awards
- Second-team All-American (1923)

Records
- Military career
- Allegiance: United States
- Branch: U.S. Navy
- Service years: 1942–1946
- Rank: Lt. Commander
- Conflicts: World War II
- College Football Hall of Fame; Inducted in 1974 (profile)

Marvin Allen "Mal" Stevens (April 14, 1900 – December 6, 1979) was an American football player, coach, naval officer, and orthopedic surgeon. He served as the head football coach at Yale University from 1928 to 1932 and New York University (NYU) from 1934 to 1941. He was elected to the College Football Hall of Fame as a player in 1974.

== Early life, playing career, and education ==
Born in Stockton, Kansas, Stevens attended Washburn College for three years before transferring to Yale College. At Washburn, Stevens competed on the football, basketball, baseball, tennis, and track and field teams. He played halfback on Yale's undefeated 1923 football team. He graduated from Yale in 1925 and was a member of Skull and Bones. He graduated from Yale Medical School in 1929.

== Coaching career and military service ==
Stevens coached the Yale football team from 1928 to 1932, leaving to become the 21st head football coach at New York University in 1934. His coached at NYU through the 1941 season, compiling a record of 33 wins, 34 losses, and 2 ties. This ranks him second at NYU in total wins and tenth at NYU in winning percentage. Stevens was awarded a place in the NYU Athletic Hall of Fame for his coaching efforts.

Stevens then served as a lieutenant commander in the United States Navy during World War II. In 1946 he became head coach of the Brooklyn Dodgers of the All-America Football Conference. He was the Eastern Director of the Sister Kenny Rehabilitation Institute and Clinic in Jersey City, New Jersey and clinical professor of orthopedic surgery at Bellevue Hospital Center.

== Head coaching record ==
=== College ===
Year	Team	Overall	Conference	Standing	Bowl/playoffs
Yale Bulldogs (Independent) (1928–1932)
1928	Yale	4–4			
1929	Yale	5–2–1			
1930	Yale	5–2–2			
1931	Yale	5–1–2			
1932	Yale	2–2–3			
Yale:		21–11–8			
NYU Violets (Independent) (1934–1941)
1934	NYU	3–4–1			
1935	NYU	7–1			
1936	NYU	5–3–1			
1937	NYU	5–4			
1938	NYU	4–4			
1939	NYU	5–4			
1940	NYU	2–7			
1941	NYU	2–7			
NYU:		33–34–2			
Sampson Naval Training Station Bluejackets (Independent) (1943)
1943	Sampson NTS	7–2			
Sampson NTS:		7–2			
Total:		61–47–10			
