= Mickey Colmer =

American football player (1918–2000)

Profile
- Position: Fullback

Personal information
- Born: October 23, 1918; Torrance, California, U.S.
- Died: July 20, 2000 (aged 81); Redondo Beach, California, U.S.
- Listed height: 6 ft 2 in (1.88 m)
- Listed weight: 219 lb (99 kg)

Career information
- High school: Redondo Union (CA)

Career history
- Brooklyn Dodgers (1946-1948); New York Yankees (1949)
- Stats at Pro Football Reference

John Francis "Mickey" Colmer (October 23, 1918 – July 20, 2000) was an American football fullback.

Colmer was born in Torrance, California, in 1918 and attended Redondo Union High School. He was an All-Southland fullback in 1936.

He did not play college football, opting instead to play professional baseball after graduating from high school. He played minor league baseball for three years with the Moline Plowboys (1938), Bisbee Bees (1938-1939), and Tucson Cowboys (1940). He compiled a .353 batting average with Bisbee in 1938. He also appeared in 11 games as a pitcher in 1940.

Colmer played football while serving in the Army and began playing professionally for the Los Angeles Bulldogs. He next played professional football in the All-America Football Conference for the Brooklyn Dodgers from 1946 to 1948 and for the New York Yankees in 1949. He appeared in 48 professional football games, 29 of them as a starter, and totaled 1,537 rushing yards, 899 receiving yards, and 21 touchdowns.

Colmer died in 2000 in Redondo Beach, California.
