= Brooklyn Dodgers (AAFC) =

1946 to 1948 Brooklyn Dodgers of All-America Football Conference (AAFC)

General information
- Founded: 1946
- Folded: 1949; 77 years ago (merged with New York Yankees in 1949)
- Stadium: Ebbets Field
- Headquartered: Brooklyn, New York, United States
- Colors: Gold & Black (1946–47) Blue & White (1948)

League / conference affiliations
- All-America Football Conference; Eastern Division

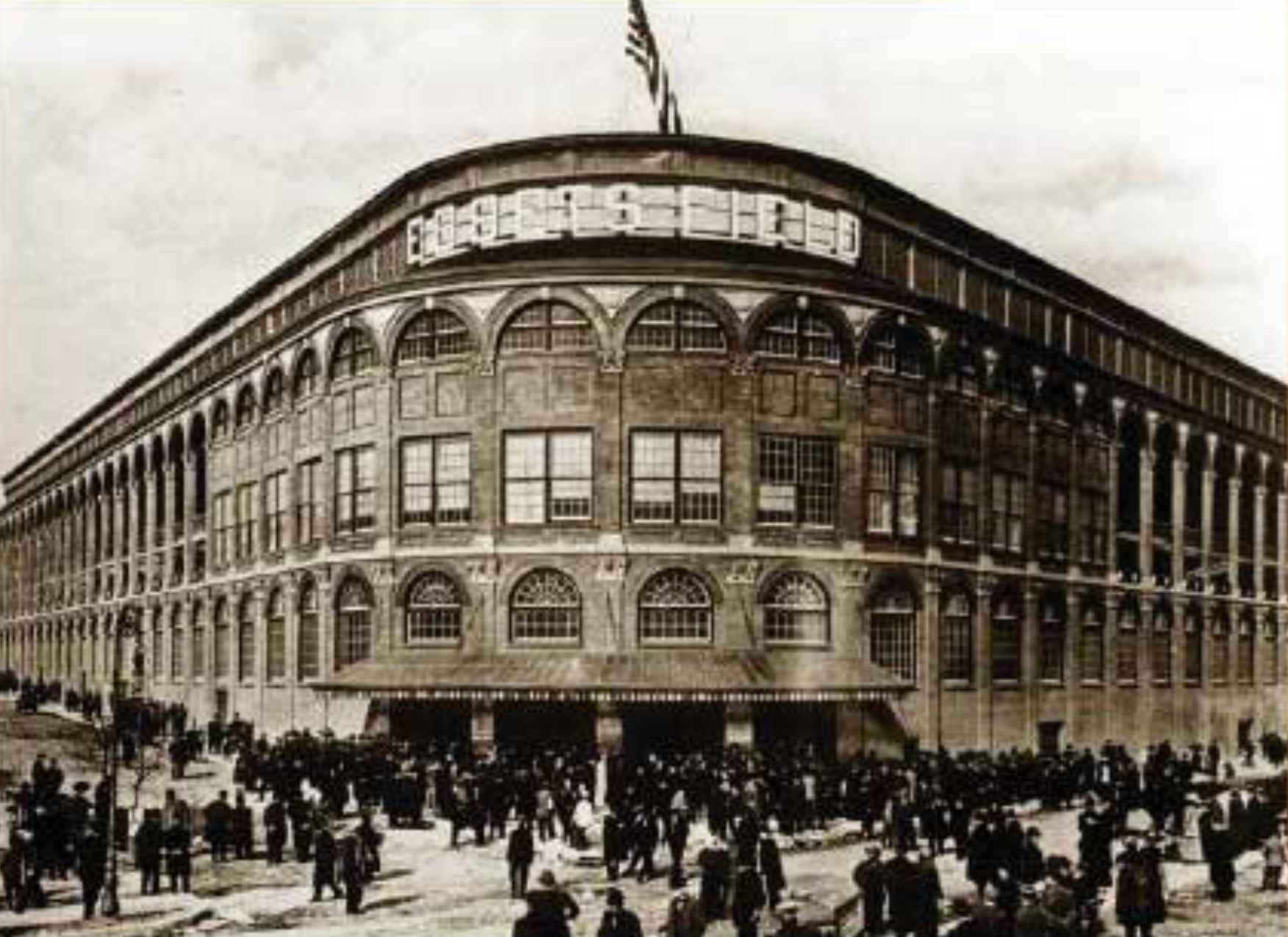

The Brooklyn Dodgers were an American football team that played in the All-America Football Conference (AAFC) from 1946 to 1948. The team is unrelated to the Brooklyn Dodgers that played in the National Football League from 1930 to 1943. The team folded prior to the 1949 season and was merged with the New York Yankees to form the Brooklyn-New York Yankees.

== Team history ==
The Brooklyn Dodgers of the new AAFC held their first training camp in the summer of 1946 out west in central Oregon in the small town of Bend. Led by head coach Mal Stevens, some 62 members of the team assembled in Bend in the middle of July of that year. The team played two preseason games in the Pacific Northwest, the first in Portland against the Chicago Rockets at Multnomah Stadium on August 18, and the following Saturday night in Spokane against the New York Yankees at Gonzaga Stadium. On August 30, 1946 they played their one and only official preseason game at the Akron Rubber Bowl against the Cleveland Browns; they lost 35-20. That season the Dodgers were second in the Eastern division with a record of 3-10-1. After 7 games, head coach Mal Stevens was replaced with Cliff Battles. In 1947, they also went 3-10-1 but finished third in the Eastern Division. In 1948, their last season before merging with the New York Yankees, Carl Voyles was their coach. The team went 2-10 and finished fourth in the Eastern Division of the AAFC.

The star of the Dodgers was passing halfback Glenn Dobbs, an All-American at the University of Tulsa.

== Season records ==
Season records
Season	W	L	T	Finish	Playoff results
Brooklyn Dodgers
1946	3	10	1	2nd AAFC East	--
1947	3	10	1	3rd AAFC East	--
1948	2	12	0	4th AAFC East	--
Brooklyn-New York Yankees
1949	8	4	0	3rd AAFC	Lost semi-final
Totals	16	36	2		
