= 1952 San Francisco 49ers season =

American football team season

- Owner: Tony Morabito
- General manager: Louis Spadia
- Head coach: Buck Shaw
- Home stadium: Kezar Stadium

Results
- Record: 7–5
- Division place: 3rd NFL National
- Playoffs: Did not qualify
- Pro Bowlers: 7: RB Hugh McElhenny; RB Joe Perry; WR Gordy Soltau; C Bill Johnson; DE Ed Henke; DT Leo Nomellini; LB Hardy Brown

The 1952 San Francisco 49ers season was the franchise's 3rd season in the National Football League and their 7th overall. They were coming off a 7–4–1 record in 1951.

The 49ers won their first five games by at least two touchdowns and had visions of playing in their first-ever NFL Championship Game. However, they lost five of their final seven games to finish at 7–5, third place in the six-team National Conference (which became the Western Conference in 1953).

Y. A. Tittle emerged as the starting quarterback, as he had a completion rate of 51.0% along with eleven touchdowns and 1,407 yards. Frankie Albert also had some action, completing 55.0% of his passes, along with eight TDs and 964 yards.

Joe Perry ran for 725 yards and eight TDs, while rookie Hugh McElhenny had 684 yards on 98 attempts (7.0 yards/carry), along with six rushing TDs, while he caught 26 passes for 367 yards and earned another three touchdowns. Gordie Soltau led the club with 55 receptions for 774 yards and seven TDs.

== Offseason ==
=== NFL draft ===
1952 San Francisco 49ers draft
Round	Pick	Player	Position	College	Notes
1	9	Hugh McElhenny * ^{†}	HB	Washington	
2	22	Bob Toneff *	T	Notre Dame	
3	27	Gene Shannon	HB	Houston	
3	33	Billy Tidwell	HB	Texas A&M	
4	46	Marion Campbell *	T	Georgia	
5	57	Pat O'Donahue	E	Wisconsin	
6	70	Jim Beasley	C	Tulsa	
7	81	Don Robison	HB	California	
8	94	Jerry Smith	T	Wisconsin	
9	105	Glen Christian	HB	Idaho	
10	118	Carl West	FB	Ole Miss	
11	129	J. D. Kimmel	T	Houston	
12	142	Fred Snyder	E	Loyola (CA)	
13	153	Rudy Yeager	T	LSU	
14	166	Frank Simons	E	Nebraska	
15	177	Haldo Norman	E	Gustavus Adolphus	
16	190	Bob Meyers	HB	Stanford	
17	201	Al Baldock	E	USC	
18	214	Bill Carey	E	Michigan State	
20	238	Jess Yates	E	LSU	
21	249	Gene Offield	E	Hardin–Simmons	
22	262	Jim Cozad	T	Santa Clara	
23	273	Bill Glazier	E	Arizona	
24	286	Ralph Kreuger	T	California	
25	297	Henry (Bud) Laughlin	FB	Kansas	
26	310	Dick Kane	G	Cincinnati	
27	321	Waldo Schaaf	T	Oklahoma A&M	
28	334	Joe Palumbo	G	Virginia	
29	345	Chuck Mosher	E	Colorado	
30	358	Dick Patrick	C	Oregon	
Made roster † Pro Football Hall of Fame * Made at least one Pro Bowl during career

== Preseason ==
Week	Date	Opponent	Result	Record	Venue	Attendance
1	August 10	San Francisco Broncos	W 79–0	1–0	Kezar Stadium	8,700
2	August 17	Washington Redskins	W 35–0	2–0	Kezar Stadium	35,234
3	August 24	Chicago Cardinals	W 38–14	3–0	Kezar Stadium	34,901
4	September 3	at Los Angeles Rams	W 17–7	4–0	Los Angeles Memorial Coliseum	67,799
5	September 7	at Pittsburgh Steelers	W 29–14	5–0	Forbes Field	21,759
6	September 13	at Cleveland Browns	W 35–31	6–0	Rubber Bowl	30,119
7	September 19	at San Jose Packers	W 76–0	7–0	Spartan Stadium	6,839

== Regular season ==
=== Schedule ===
Week	Date	Opponent	Result	Record	Venue	Attendance	Recap
1	September 28	**Detroit Lions**	**W** 17–3	1–0	Kezar Stadium	52,750	Recap
2	October 4	at **Dallas Texans**	**W** 37–14	2–0	Cotton Bowl	12,566	Recap
3	October 12	at **Detroit Lions**	**W** 28–0	3–0	Briggs Stadium	42,842	Recap
4	October 19	at **Chicago Bears**	**W** 40–16	4–0	Wrigley Field	46,338	Recap
5	October 26	**Dallas Texans**	**W** 48–21	5–0	Kezar Stadium	26,887	Recap
6	November 2	**Chicago Bears**	**L** 17–20	5–1	Kezar Stadium	58,255	Recap
7	November 9	at New York Giants	**L** 14–23	5–2	Polo Grounds	54,230	Recap
8	November 16	at Washington Redskins	**W** 23–17	6–2	Griffith Stadium	30,863	Recap
9	November 23	at **Los Angeles Rams**	**L** 9–35	6–3	Los Angeles Memorial Coliseum	64,450	Recap
10	November 30	**Los Angeles Rams**	**L** 21–34	6–4	Kezar Stadium	49,420	Recap
11	December 7	Pittsburgh Steelers	**L** 7–24	6–5	Kezar Stadium	13,886	Recap
12	December 14	**Green Bay Packers**	**W** 24–14	7–5	Kezar Stadium	17,579	Recap
Note: Intra-conference opponents are in **bold** text.

=== Standings ===
NFL National Conference
	W	L	T	PCT	CONF	PF	PA	STK
Detroit Lions	9	3	0	.750	7–3	344	192	W3
Los Angeles Rams	9	3	0	.750	8–2	349	234	W8
San Francisco 49ers	7	5	0	.583	6–3	285	221	W1
Green Bay Packers	6	6	0	.500	3–6	295	312	L3
Chicago Bears	5	7	0	.417	4–6	245	326	W1
Dallas Texans	1	11	0	.083	1–9	182	427	L2

Note: Tie games were not officially counted in the standings until 1972.

== Personnel ==
=== Roster ===
1953 San Francisco 49ers roster
Quarterbacks: 13 Frankie Albert P; 14 Y. A. Tittle; Running backs: 38 Ben Aldridge; 22 Joe Arenas; 39 Hugh McElhenny; 34 Joe Perry; 45 Johnny Strzykalski; 25 Bob White; Receivers: 24 J. R. Boone; 82 Gordy Soltau K; 84 Billy Wilson	Offensive linemen: 63 Bruno Banducci G; 67 Nick Feher G; 53 Bill Johnson C; 73 Leo Nomellini T/DT; 69 Jerry Smith G; 62 Bob Toneff T/DT; 52 Pete Wismann C/LB; Defensive linemen: 76 Don Campora DT; 75 Al Carapella DT/MG/DE; 72 Ray Collins DT; 89 Ed Henke DE/WR; 68 Bob Momsen MG; 83 Pat O'Donahue DE; 87 Charley Powell DE	Linebackers: 33 Hardy Brown MLB; 32 Don Burke OLB/MG; 15 Jim Powers OLB/QB; Defensive backs: 23 Rex Berry CB; 43 Jim Cason S; 28 Sam Cathcart S/CB; 42 Lowell Wagner CB/WR	Reserve lists: 54 Gail Bruce DE (IR); 64 Visco Grgich MG (IR); 85 Bill Jessup WR (Military); -- Clay Matthews T (Military); -- Jim Monachino RB (Military); -- Haldo Norman WR (IR); -- Pete Schabarum RB (Military); 36 Norm Standlee RB (IR); rookies in italics

== Pro Bowl ==
San Francisco's players selected for the Pro Bowl:

Player	Position
Hardy Brown	Linebacker
Ed Henke	Defensive end
Bill Johnson	Center
Hugh McElhenny	Running back
Leo Nomellini	Defensive tackle
Joe Perry	Running back
Gordie Soltau	Wide receiver
