= 1951 San Francisco 49ers season =

American football team season

- Owner: Tony Morabito
- General manager: John Blackinger
- Head coach: Buck Shaw
- Home stadium: Kezar Stadium

Results
- Record: 7–4–1
- Conference place: T–2nd NFL National
- Playoffs: Did not qualify

The 1951 San Francisco 49ers season was the franchise's 2nd season in the National Football League and their 6th overall. The team was coming off a 3–9 record in 1950.

The 49ers won their first ever NFL road game on October 14 against the Pittsburgh Steelers, after losing their first 7 in the league. The Niners were in playoff contention all year long, finishing 7–4–1, just a half game out of first place in the National Conference. Their biggest win of the season was a 44–17 victory over their California rivals, the Los Angeles Rams.

Frankie Albert and Y. A. Tittle split time at quarterback, with Albert throwing for 1,116 yards, while Tittle led the club with 8 TDs and completed 55.3% of his passes. Joe Perry once again led the team in rushing with 677 yards and 3 TDs, and wide receiver Gordie Soltau led the club with 59 catches for 826 yards and 7 TDs.

== Offseason ==
=== NFL draft ===
1951 San Francisco 49ers draft
Round	Pick	Player	Position	College	Notes
1	3	Y. A. Tittle * ^{†}	Quarterback	LSU	Former Baltimore Colts player
2	17	Pete Schabarum	Halfback	California	
3	28	Billy Mixon	Halfback	Georgia	began play with 49ers in 1953.
5	53	Dick Steere	Guard	Drake	
5	54	Al Carapella *	Tackle	Miami (FL)	
6	64	Bishop Strickland	Halfback	South Carolina	
7	75	Dick Forbes	End	St. Ambrose	
8	89	Joe Arenas	Halfback	Omaha	
9	100	Bruce Van Alstyne	End	Stanford	
10	112	Nick Feher	Guard	Georgia	
11	126	Bill Jessup	End	USC	
12	137	Jim Monachino	Halfback	Stanford	
13	148	Dick Harvin	End	Georgia Tech	
14	162	Rex Berry	Defensive back	BYU	
15	173	Dave Sparks	Guard	South Carolina	
16	184	Bob White	Halfback	Stanford	
17	198	Art Michalik	Guard	St. Ambrose	
18	209	Jim Murphy	Tackle	Xavier	
19	220	John Phillips	Halfback	Southern Miss	
20	234	Al Tate	Tackle	Illinois	
21	245	Hardy Brown *	Back	Tulsa	previously played for the Washington Redskins
22	256	Dwight Winslow	Back	Boise J.C.	
23	270	Wally Brunswald	Back	Gustavus Adolphus	
24	281	Tom Kingsford	Quarterback	Montana	
25	292	Mike Peterson	End	Denver	
26	306	Keith Carpenter	Tackle	San Jose State	
27	317	Ray Lung	Guard	Oregon	
28	328	Jack Rohan	Back	Loras	
29	342	S. P. Garnett	Tackle	Kansas	
30	353	Jerry Faske	Back	Iowa	
Made roster † Pro Football Hall of Fame * Made at least one Pro Bowl during career

== Preseason ==
Week	Date	Opponent	Result	Record	Venue	Attendance
1	August 19	Washington Redskins	W 45–14	1–0	Kezar Stadium	27,280
2	August 26	Chicago Bears	L 7–24	1–1	Kezar Stadium	38,836
3	September 7	vs. Pittsburgh Steelers	W 24–7	2–1	Archbold Stadium	18,000
4	September 12	vs. Green Bay Packers	W 20–0	3–1	Parade Stadium	19,021
5	September 23	vs. Chicago Cardinals	W 37–17	4–1	Creighton Stadium	10,000

== Regular season ==
=== Schedule ===
Week	Date	Opponent	Result	Record	Venue	Attendance	Recap
1	September 30	Cleveland Browns	**W** 24–10	1–0	Kezar Stadium	48,263	Recap
2	October 6	at Philadelphia Eagles	**L** 14–21	1–1	Shibe Park	23,827	Recap
3	October 14	at Pittsburgh Steelers	**W** 28–24	2–1	Forbes Field	27,124	Recap
4	October 21	at **Chicago Bears**	**L** 7–13	2–2	Wrigley Field	42,296	Recap
5	October 28	**Los Angeles Rams**	**W** 44–17	3–2	Kezar Stadium	49,538	Recap
6	November 4	at **Los Angeles Rams**	**L** 16–23	3–3	Los Angeles Memorial Coliseum	54,346	Recap
7	November 11	**New York Yanks**	**W** 19–14	4–3	Kezar Stadium	25,538	Recap
8	November 18	Chicago Cardinals	**L** 21–27	4–4	Kezar Stadium	19,658	Recap
9	November 25	at **New York Yanks**	**T** 10–10	4–4–1	Yankee Stadium	10,184	Recap
10	December 2	at **Detroit Lions**	**W** 20–10	5–4–1	Briggs Stadium	46,467	Recap
11	December 9	**Green Bay Packers**	**W** 31–19	6–4–1	Kezar Stadium	15,121	Recap
12	December 16	**Detroit Lions**	**W** 21–17	7–4–1	Kezar Stadium	27,276	Recap
Note: Intra-conference opponents are in **bold** text.

=== Game summaries ===
==== Week 1: vs. Cleveland Browns ====
Week 1: Cleveland Browns at San Francisco 49ers – Game summary

Quarter	1	2	3	4	Total
Browns	7	0	3	0	**10**
**49ers**	7	3	7	7	**24**

at Kezar Stadium, San Francisco

- Date: Sunday, September 30
- Game attendance: 48,263
- Pro-Football-Reference.com

Game information

First quarter

- CLE – Dub Jones 79 yard pass from Otto Graham, Lou Groza kick (CLE 7–0)
- SF – Billy Wilson 25 yard pass from Frankie Albert, Gordie Soltau kick (TIE 7–7)

Second quarter

- SF – Gordie Soltau 42 yard field goal (SF 10–7)

Third quarter

- SF – Joe Perry 6 yard run, Gordie Soltau kick (SF 17–7)
- CLE – Lou Groza 40 yard field goal (SF 17–10)

Fourth quarter

- SF – Joe Perry 6 yard run, Gordie Soltau kick (SF 24–10)

Top passers

- CLE –
- SF –

Top rushers

- CLE –
- SF – Verl Lillywhite 17 Car, 145 Yds

Top receivers

- CLE – Dub Jones 5 Rec, 143 Yds, 1 TD
- SF –

Top tacklers

- CLE –
- SF –

==== Week 2: at Philadelphia Eagles ====
Week 2: San Francisco 49ers at Philadelphia Eagles – Game summary

Quarter	1	2	3	4	Total
49ers	7	0	0	7	**14**
**Eagles**	7	0	7	7	**21**

at Shibe Park, Philadelphia

- Date: Sunday, October 7
- Game attendance: 23,827
- Pro-Football-Reference.com

Game information

First quarter

- SF – Verl Lillywhite 60 yard run, Gordie Soltau kick (SF 7–0)
- PHI – Jim Parmer 60 yard run, Bobby Walston kick (TIE 7–7)

Second quarter

No scoring

Third quarter

- PHI – Clyde Scott 49 yard pass from Adrian Burk, Bobby Walston kick (PHI 14–7)

Fourth quarter

- PHI – Clyde Scott 28 yard pass from Adrian Burk, Bobby Walston kick (PHI 21–7)
- SF – Verl Lillywhite 11 yard pass from Y. A. Tittle, Gordie Soltau kick (PHI 21–14)

Top passers

- SF –
- PHI –

Top rushers

- SF –
- PHI –

Top receivers

- SF –
- PHI –

Top tacklers

- SF –
- PHI –

==== Week 3: at Pittsburgh Steelers ====
Week 3: San Francisco 49ers at Pittsburgh Steelers – Game summary

Quarter	1	2	3	4	Total
**49ers**	7	0	21	0	**28**
Steelers	0	10	0	14	**24**

at Forbes Field, Pittsburgh

- Date: Sunday, October 14
- Game attendance: 27,124
- Pro-Football-Reference.com

Game information

First quarter

- SF – Jim Cason 65 yard interception return, Gordie Soltau kick (SF 7–0)

Second quarter

- PIT – Elbie Nickel 77 yard pass from Joe Geri, Joe Geri kick (TIE 7–7)
- PIT – Joe Geri 16 yard field goal (PIT 10–7)

Third quarter

- SF – Jim Monachino 7 yard run, Gordie Soltau kick (SF 14–10)
- SF – Joe Perry 4 yard pass from Frankie Albert, Gordie Soltau kick (SF 21–10)
- SF – Pete Schabarum 8 yard run, Gordie Soltau kick (SF 28–10)

Fourth quarter

- PIT – Lynn Chandnois 8 yard pass from Ray Mathews, Joe Geri kick (SF 28–17)
- PIT – Elbie Nickel 22 yard pass from Ray Mathews, Joe Geri kick (SF 28–24)

Top passers

- SF –
- PIT –

Top rushers

- SF –
- PIT –

Top receivers

- SF – Gordie Soltau 6 Rec, 120 Yds
- PIT –

Top tacklers

- SF –
- PIT –

==== Week 4: at Chicago Bears ====
Week 4: San Francisco 49ers at Chicago Bears – Game summary

Quarter	1	2	3	4	Total
49ers	0	0	0	7	**7**
**Bears**	6	0	7	0	**13**

at Wrigley Field, Chicago

- Date: Sunday, October 21
- Game attendance: 42,296
- Pro-Football-Reference.com

Game information

First quarter

- LA – John Dottley 77 yard pass from Johnny Lujack, kick failed (CHI 6–0)

Second quarter

No scoring

Third quarter

- CHI – Johnny Lujack 1 yard run, Johnny Lujack kick (CHI 13–0)

Fourth quarter

- SF – Gordie Soltau 41 yard pass from Y. A. Tittle, Gordie Soltau kick (CHI 13–7)

Top passers

- SF –
- CHI –

Top rushers

- SF –
- CHI – John Dottley 16 Car, 112 Yds

Top receivers

- SF – Gordie Soltau 8 Rec, 109 Yds, 1 TD
- CHI –

Top tacklers

- SF –
- CHI –

==== Week 5: vs. Los Angeles Rams ====
Week 5: Los Angeles Rams at San Francisco 49ers – Game summary

Quarter	1	2	3	4	Total
Rams	3	7	7	0	**17**
**49ers**	10	28	0	6	**44**

at Kezar Stadium, San Francisco

- Date: Sunday, October 28
- Game attendance: 49,538
- Pro-Football-Reference.com

Game information

First quarter

- SF – Gordie Soltau 23 yard field goal (SF 3–0)
- LA – Bob Waterfield 26 yard field goal (TIE 3–3)
- SF – Joe Arenas 2 yard run, Gordie Soltau kick (SF 10–3)

Second quarter

- SF – Gordie Soltau 10 yard pass from Frankie Albert, Gordie Soltau kick (SF 17–3)
- LA – Elroy Hirsch 79 yard pass from Norm Van Brocklin, Bob Waterfield kick (SF 17–10)
- SF – Johnny Strzykalski 1 yard run, Gordie Soltau kick (SF 24–10)
- SF – Leo Nomellini 20 yard blocked punt return, Gordie Soltau kick (SF 31–10)
- SF – Gordie Soltau 13 yard pass from Y. A. Tittle, Gordie Soltau kick (SF 38–10)

Third quarter

- LA – Dick Hoerner 12 yard run, Bob Waterfield kick (SF 38–17)

Fourth quarter

- SF – Gordie Soltau 48 yard pass from Y. A. Tittle, kick failed (SF 44–17)

Top passers

- LA –
- SF –

Top rushers

- LA –
- SF –

Top receivers

- LA – Elroy Hirsch 7 Rec, 163 Yds, 1 TD
- SF – Gordie Soltau 6 Rec, 132 Yds, 3 TDs

Top tacklers

- LA –
- SF –

==== Week 6: at Los Angeles Rams ====
Week 6: San Francisco 49ers at Los Angeles Rams – Game summary

Quarter	1	2	3	4	Total
49ers	0	7	6	3	**16**
**Rams**	10	3	0	10	**23**

at Los Angeles Memorial Coliseum, Los Angeles

- Date: Sunday, November 4
- Game attendance: 54,346
- Pro-Football-Reference.com

Game information

First quarter

- LA – Bob Waterfield 39 yard field goal (LA 3–0)
- LA – Bob Waterfield 1 yard run, Bob Waterfield kick (LA 10–0)

Second quarter

- SF – Joe Perry 58 yard run, Gordie Soltau kick (LA 10–7)
- LA – Bob Waterfield 20 yard field goal (LA 13–7)

Third quarter

- SF – Frankie Albert 7 yard run, kick failed (TIE 13–13)

Fourth quarter

- SF – Gordie Soltau 11 yard field goal (SF 16–13)
- LA – Elroy Hirsch 79 yard pass from Bob Waterfield, Bob Waterfield kick (LA 20–16)
- LA – Bob Waterfield 39 yard field goal (LA 23–16)

Top passers

- SF –
- LA –

Top rushers

- SF – Joe Perry 12 Car, 115 Yds, 1 TD
- LA –

Top receivers

- SF –
- LA – Elroy Hirsch 4 Rec, 103 Yds, 1 TD

Top tacklers

- SF –
- LA –

==== Week 7: vs. New York Yanks ====
Week 7: New York Yanks at San Francisco 49ers – Game summary

Quarter	1	2	3	4	Total
Yanks	0	14	0	0	**14**
**49ers**	7	0	3	9	**19**

at Kezar Stadium, San Francisco

- Date: Sunday, November 11
- Game attendance: 36,571
- Pro-Football-Reference.com

Game information

First quarter

- SF – Gordie Soltau 5 yard pass from Frankie Albert, Gordie Soltau kick (SF 7–0)

Second quarter

- NYY – Buddy Young 1 yard run, Harvey Johnson kick (TIE 7–7)
- NYY – Dan Edwards 20 yard pass from Bob Celeri, Harvey Johnson kick (NYY 14–7)

Third quarter

- SF – Gordie Soltau 19 yard field goal (NYY 14–10)

Fourth quarter

- SF – Safety, Hamp Tanner tackled Bob Celeri in end zone (NYY 14–12)
- SF – Billy Wilson 7 yard pass from Y. A. Tittle, Gordie Soltau kick (SF 19–14)

Top passers

- NYY –
- SF –

Top rushers

- NYY –
- SF –

Top receivers

- NYY –
- SF –

Top tacklers

- NYY –
- SF –

==== Week 8: vs. Chicago Cardinals ====
Week 8: Chicago Cardinals at San Francisco 49ers – Game summary

Quarter	1	2	3	4	Total
**Cardinals**	7	17	3	0	**27**
49ers	7	0	7	7	**21**

at Kezar Stadium, San Francisco

- Date: Sunday, November 18
- Game attendance: 19,658
- Pro-Football-Reference.com

Game information

First quarter

- CHC – Charley Trippi 8 yard run, Cliff Patton kick (CHC 7–0)
- SF – Frankie Albert 4 yard run, Gordie Soltau kick (TIE 7–7)

Second quarter

- CHC – Elmer Angsman 80 yard pass from Charley Trippi, Cliff Patton kick (CHC 14–7)
- CHC – Don Paul 4 yard run, Cliff Patton kick (CHC 21–7)
- CHC – Cliff Patton 16 yard field goal (CHC 24–7)

Third quarter

- SF – Frankie Albert 10 yard run, Gordie Soltau kick (CHC 24–14)
- CHC – Cliff Patton 24 yard field goal (CHC 27–14)

Fourth quarter

- SF – Pete Schabarum 14 yard run, Gordie Soltau kick (CHC 27–21)

Top passers

- CHC –
- SF –

Top rushers

- CHC –
- SF –

Top receivers

- CHC –
- SF – Gordie Soltau 8 Rec, 110 Yds

Top tacklers

- CHC –
- SF –

==== Week 9: at New York Yanks ====
Week 9: San Francisco 49ers at New York Yanks – Game summary

Quarter	1	2	3	4	Total
49ers	7	3	0	0	**10**
Yanks	0	0	0	10	**10**

at Yankee Stadium, The Bronx, New York City

- Date: Sunday, November 25
- Game attendance: 10,184
- Pro-Football-Reference.com

Game information

First quarter

- SF – Johnny Strzykalski 8 yard run, Gordie Soltau kick (SF 7–0)

Second quarter

- SF – Gordie Soltau 21 yard field goal (SF 10–0)

Third quarter

No scoring

Fourth quarter

- NYY – Sherman Howard 8 yard run, Harvey Johnson kick (SF 10–7)
- NYY – Harvey Johnson 23 yard field goal (TIE 10–10)

Top passers

- SF –
- NYY –

Top rushers

- SF –
- NYY –

Top receivers

- SF –
- NYY –

Top tacklers

- SF –
- NYY –

==== Week 10: at Detroit Lions ====
Week 10: San Francisco 49ers at Detroit Lions – Game summary

Quarter	1	2	3	4	Total
**49ers**	6	0	7	7	**20**
Lions	0	3	7	0	**10**

at Briggs Stadium, Detroit

- Date: Sunday, December 2
- Game attendance: 46,467
- Pro-Football-Reference.com

Game information

First quarter

- SF – Johnny Strzykalski 1 yard run, kick failed (SF 6–0)

Second quarter

- DET – Doak Walker 23 yard field goal (SF 6–3)

Third quarter

- SF – Bill Jessup 23 yard pass from Y. A. Tittle, Gordie Soltau kick (SF 13–3)
- DET – Dorne Dibble 30 yard pass from Bobby Layne, Doak Walker kick (SF 13–10)

Fourth quarter

- SF – Joe Arenas 12 yard pass from Y. A. Tittle, Gordie Soltau kick (SF 20–10)

Top passers

- SF –
- DET –

Top rushers

- SF – Joe Perry 22 Car, 126 Yds
- DET –

Top receivers

- SF –
- DET –

Top tacklers

- SF –
- DET –

==== Week 11: vs. Green Bay Packers ====
Week 11: Green Bay Packers at San Francisco 49ers – Game summary

Quarter	1	2	3	4	Total
Packers	3	10	6	0	**19**
**49ers**	3	7	7	14	**31**

at Kezar Stadium, San Francisco

- Date: Sunday, December 9
- Game attendance: 15,121
- Pro-Football-Reference.com

Game information

First quarter

- GB – Fred Cone 20 yard field goal (GB 3–0)
- SF – Gordie Soltau 23 yard field goal (TIE 3–3)

Second quarter

- GB – Fred Cone 37 yard field goal (GB 6–3)
- SF – Joe Arenas 7 yard run, Gordie Soltau kick (SF 10–6)
- GB – Ray Pelfrey 3 yard pass from Tobin Rote, Fred Cone kick (GB 13–10)

Third quarter

- SF – Joe Arenas 1 yard run, Gordie Soltau kick (SF 17–13)
- GB – Carl Elliott 11 yard pass from Tobin Rote, kick failed (GB 19–17)

Fourth quarter

- SF – Jim Monachino 1 yard run, Gordie Soltau kick (SF 24–19)
- SF – Gordie Soltau 9 yard pass from Frankie Albert, Gail Bruce pass from Frankie Albert (SF 31–19)

Top passers

- DET –
- SF –

Top rushers

- DET –
- SF –

Top receivers

- DET –
- SF –

Top tacklers

- DET –
- SF –

==== Week 12: vs. Detroit Lions ====
Week 12: Detroit Lions at San Francisco 49ers – Game summary

Quarter	1	2	3	4	Total
Lions	3	7	7	0	**17**
**49ers**	0	14	0	7	**21**

at Kezar Stadium, San Francisco

- Date: Sunday, December 16
- Game attendance: 27,276
- Pro-Football-Reference.com

Game information

First quarter

- DET – Pat Harder 13 yard field goal (DET 3–0)

Second quarter

- DET – Pat Harder 1 yard run, Doak Walker kick (DET 10–0)
- SF – Billy Wilson 31 yard pass from Joe Perry, Gordie Soltau kick (DET 10–7)
- SF – Gordie Soltau 27 yard pass from Y. A. Tittle, Gordie Soltau kick (SF 14–10)

Third quarter

- DET – Leon Hart 28 yard pass from Bobby Layne, Doak Walker kick (DET 17–14)

Fourth quarter

- SF – Y. A. Tittle 1 yard run, Gordie Soltau kick (SF 21–17)

Top passers

- DET –
- SF –

Top rushers

- DET –
- SF –

Top receivers

- DET –
- SF –

Top tacklers

- DET –
- SF –

== Standings ==
NFL National Conference
	W	L	T	PCT	CONF	PF	PA	STK
Los Angeles Rams	8	4	0	.667	7–2	392	261	W1
San Francisco 49ers	7	4	1	.636	5–2–1	255	205	W3
Detroit Lions	7	4	1	.636	5–4–1	336	259	L1
Chicago Bears	7	5	0	.583	6–2	286	282	L1
Green Bay Packers	3	9	0	.250	1–8	254	375	L7
New York Yanks	1	9	2	.100	1–7–2	241	382	L2

Note: Tie games were not officially counted in the standings until 1972.

== Roster ==
1951 San Francisco 49ers final roster
Quarterbacks: 63 Frankie Albert P; 64 Y. A. Tittle; Running backs: 82 Joe Arenas; 81 Verl Lillywhite P/OLB; 99 Jim Monachino; 74 Joe Perry; 88 Pete Schabarum; 75 Bishop Strickland; 91 Johnny Strzykalski; Receivers: 53 Alyn Beals DE; 55 Bill Jessup; 51 Gordy Soltau K; 58 Billy Wilson	Linemen: 33 Bruno Banducci G/MG; 54 Gail Bruce DE; 45 Al Carapella DT; 43 Ray Collins DT; 37 Nick Feher G; 34 Visco Grgich MG/G; 47 Ed Henke DE; 23 Bill Johnson C; 42 Leo Nomellini T/DT; 39 Dave Sparks G; 46 Hamp Tanner T/DT	Linebackers: 73 Hardy Brown MLB; 38 Don Burke OLB/G; 62 Jim Powers OLB/CB; 72 Norm Standlee OLB/FB; 22 Pete Wismann OLB/C; Defensive backs: 83 Rex Berry CB; 93 Jim Cason S; 92 Lowell Wagner CB; 85 Bob White CB/RB	Reserve list: -- Howie Livingston CB (Military); 59 Alex Lloyd WR (IR); -- Clay Matthews T (Military); 52 Hal Shoener DE/WR (IR); rookies in italics

== Pro Bowl ==
San Francisco's players selected for the Pro Bowl:

Player	Position
Jim Cason	Defensive back
Ray Collins	Defensive line
Leo Nomellini	Defensive line
Gordie Soltau	Wide receiver
