= Billy Wilson (wide receiver) =

American football player (1927–2009)

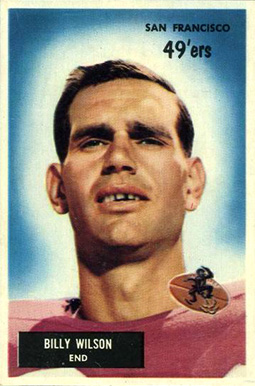
- Wilson on a 1955 Bowman football card

No. 58, 84
- Position: End

Personal information
- Born: February 3, 1927; Sayre, Oklahoma, U.S.
- Died: January 27, 2009 (aged 81); Carlsbad, California, U.S.
- Listed height: 6 ft 3 in (1.91 m)
- Listed weight: 190 lb (86 kg)

Career information
- High school: Campbell (Campbell, California)
- College: San Jose State (1945, 1948–1950)
- NFL draft: 1950: 22nd round, 283rd overall pick

Career history

Playing
- San Francisco 49ers (1951–1960)

Coaching
- San Francisco 49ers (1960–1962) Assistant coach; San Francisco 49ers (1963–1967) Offensive ends coach; The Hawaiians (1974–1975) Receivers coach

Awards and highlights
- First-team All-Pro (1957); 3× Second-team All-Pro (1954–1956); 6× Pro Bowl (1954-1959); 3× NFL receptions leader (1954, 1956, 1957); NFL receiving touchdowns co-leader (1953)

Career NFL statistics
- Receptions: 407
- Receiving yards: 5,902
- Receiving touchdowns: 49
- Stats at Pro Football Reference

Billy Gene Wilson (February 3, 1927 – January 27, 2009) was an American professional football wide receiver who played for the San Francisco 49ers from 1951 to 1960. He was named to the Pro Bowl six times.

== Early life and college ==
Born in Sayre, Oklahoma on February 3, 1927, he moved with his family to California at the age of three as his parents sought to escape the Dust Bowl that was sweeping through the prairies during the Great Depression. He attended Campbell High School and enlisted in the United States Navy during World War II. He played college football at San Jose State University.

== Professional career ==
He was selected by the San Francisco 49ers in the 22nd round of the 1950 NFL draft, the 283rd player selected overall and the seventh receiver drafted that year by the 49ers. Wilson led the NFL in receptions in three seasons, with 60 catches in 1954, 60 in 1956 and 52 in 1957. He also led the entire decade of the 1950s in receptions.

Although drafted in 1950, Wilson did not play until 1951. When he had finally joined the team, the 49ers had finished their first season in the NFL, having played four previous seasons in the AAFC. Wilson would join the team alongside one key addition from the 1951 draft in Y.A. Tittle. Wilson would catch 18 passes for 268 yards and three touchdowns, each of which was second on the team to Gordie Soltau. The 49ers had their first winning season in the NFL with seven wins, although they finished third in the conference. Wilson would ultimately be part of six Niners teams to finish third place in his ten seasons. The 1952 season was much of the same, owing to a rush attack and limited targeting for Wilson. He caught 23 passes for 304 yards for three touchdowns, which was fourth in the team to players such as Soltau and Hugh McElhenny.

1953, however, proved his time. He caught 51 passes for 840 yards and ten touchdowns to lead the team on the receiving end, which he would do for six of his next eight seasons. Wilson had his first 100-yard game with the season finale against the Baltimore Colts, catching 9 passes for 127 yards and a touchdown. Wilson continued his breakthrough in 1954 (the final season with Buck Shaw as coach) with recognition to follow. He led the league in catches with 60 with 830 yards and five touchdowns. He was named to his first Pro Bowl that season, doing so alongside teammates like Tittle. In that game, he was named most outstanding player, catching 11 passes for 157 yards. It would be the first of six straight Pro Bowl selections.

He continued his efforts in 1955. He caught 53 passes for 831 yards for seven touchdowns. He had his best game as a player against the Chicago Bears on October 23. He caught nine passes for 192 yards with two touchdowns (it was fourth of seven times he would have a two touchdown game). He ranked in the top five for receptions, yards, touchdowns, and yards per game, and he was rewarded with another Pro Bowl selection. Wilson continued his excellence in 1956, as he started in each game for the fourth straight season (which was his last for three seasons). He caught 60 passes for 889 yards with a 74.1 yards/per game average (career highs) for five touchdowns. He led the league in receptions while being top five in yards and yards per game. Despite this, the Niners lost more games than they won in 1955 and 1956. These were the only two seasons that Wilson would play on a losing team.

Wilson continued his run in 1957, although he played in 11 games with nine starts. He led the league again in receptions and yards per game with 52 and 68.8, respectively. He also finished in the top five for receiving yards for the fifth straight year (with 757) while catching six touchdowns (third best in the NFL). He was named to the Pro Bowl yet again while garnering his first and only All-Pro selection. That year, the 49ers would finally break through in terms of potential. Their 8–4 record was good enough to force a tie with the Detroit Lions and a playoff game for the right to go to the NFL Championship Game. Wilson contributed to the 49ers first half dominance, scoring a touchdown pass from Tittle to make it 21–7. However, the Lions overcame a 20-point deficit to win 31–27. Wilson for his part caught nine passes for 107 yards and one touchdown in what proved to be his only playoff game, as the 49ers never finished higher than 3rd until 1970.

Wilson missed the first two games of the 1958 season, but he managed to play in nine games and pull in a respectable effort. He had two 100-yard games in the year, the third and last season where he had two 100-yard games. Despite his limited time on the field, he was still second in receptions and first in yards on receiving end for the Niners. Although he did not lead any categories, he finished in the top ten for receptions with 43 (7th) alongside yards (757, 2nd), touchdowns (six, 3rd), and yards per game (65.8, 5th).

1959 represented Wilson's last grand hurrah. He made his sixth consecutive Pro Bowl while playing in every game of the season (the first time he had done so since 1956), and he caught 44 passes for 540 yards with four touchdowns. In the final game of the season, he would reach an important milestone. Facing the Green Bay Packers on December 13 at Kezar Stadium, he caught five passes for 41 yards and caught his 400th career pass. He was the third player to ever do so (Don Hutson was first in 1945, while Tom Fears did so next in 1956). The catches also moved him to second all-time in receptions. Wilson finished his career with two appearances in the 1960 season. He caught his final touchdown pass in a win against Detroit and then caught his final pass against Chicago the following week.

== Legacy ==
Wilson was the fourth player to lead the NFL in receptions in three different seasons. Only five other players have done so since Wilson Y. A. Tittle, a quarterback whose time with the 49ers matched up with Wilson's, called him "one of the fiercest competitors I ever played with" and described him as "our No. 1 receiver." "Whenever we needed a big catch, I went to him because I knew he would make the play." Bob St. Clair, an offensive tackle who played with Wilson for eight seasons in San Francisco, reflected on his ability to catch balls with "hands of glue" and run with the ball after making catches, calling him "probably one of the most underrated players in N.F.L. history." Former defensive back and Pro Football Hall of Fame coach Don Shula recalled "a play Billy made when he caught a pass, leaped straight up into the air over myself and two other defenders, and ran it in for a touchdown", describing Wilson as "one of the few players of another era that would excel today." He was one of the first 49ers players to make an impact in the NFL as a receiver, with his career accomplishments all the more remarkable in an era before rule changes that increased passing and 12-game seasons, and playing for a team whose "Million Dollar Backfield" led by Tittle focused on the running game.

In the six decades since his retirement, over 200 players have caught as many passes as Wilson. In addition to his place among receptions, Wilson finished 7th in all-time touchdowns by a receiver at the time of his retirement, fittingly tied with a fellow 49er in Alyn Beals, whom he played with in his rookie year. Wilson also ranked fifth in all-time receiving yards at the time of retirement. Six of the top ten in yards (including players behind him such as Fears) are in the Hall of Fame, while Wilson is not. He ranked fourth in touchdown catches, fifth in receiving yards and sixth in receptions in franchise history at the time of his death. In addition, he is also not a member of the team's Hall of Fame (introduced in 2000), while eight of his teammates (such as Tittle) are.

Though considered on a par with Hall of Famers Raymond Berry, Tom Fears, and Elroy "Crazylegs" Hirsch, Wilson has not been inducted into the NFL's Hall, although former 49ers coach Bill Walsh led an advocacy effort on Wilson's behalf. Walsh called Wilson "the top pass receiver of his time and one of the finest blockers". Walsh said "As I've seen the men inducted into the hall, including myself, I've thought that Billy certainly should have been enshrined some years ago."

The Professional Football Researchers Association named Wilson to the PRFA Hall of Very Good Class of 2008.

== NFL career statistics ==
Legend
	Led the league
**Bold**	Career high

=== Regular season ===
Year	Team	Games		Receiving				
Year	Team	GP	GS	Rec	Yds	Avg	Lng	TD
1951	SF	9	8	18	268	14.9	38	3
1952	SF	10	10	23	304	13.2	40	3
1953	SF	**12**	**12**	51	840	16.5	61	**10**
1954	SF	**12**	**12**	**60**	830	13.8	43	5
1955	SF	**12**	**12**	53	831	15.7	72	7
1956	SF	**12**	**12**	**60**	**889**	14.8	**77**	5
1957	SF	11	9	52	757	14.6	40	6
1958	SF	9	8	43	592	13.8	44	5
1959	SF	**12**	**12**	44	540	12.3	57	4
1960	SF	4	0	3	51	**17.0**	19	1
Career		103	95	407	5,902	14.5	77	49

== Personal life ==
After retiring from the playing field, Wilson spent 30 years working for the 49ers as an assistant coach and scout.

In 2000, he was inducted into the Bay Area Sports Hall of Fame.

Wilson died at age 81 on January 27, 2009, in Carlsbad, California. He had been at a hospice center, where he died of bone cancer. He is survived by his wife, two sons, two daughters, a brother and seven grandchildren.
