= Monachino =

Monachino is a surname. It can refer to:

- Monachino, Pistoia, human settlement in Italy
- Enrico Monachino, Italian biochemist
- Jim Monachino (b. 1929), former American football halfback
- Joseph Vincent Monachino (1911–1962), Italian-born US botanist
- Simone Monachino, Italian statistics and data analysis teaching tutor at University of Trento
- Ted Monachino (b. 1966), US football coach
