= Bay Area Sports Hall of Fame =

All-sports hall of fame

The Bay Area Sports Hall of Fame honors sports figures who have made a significant impact in the San Francisco Bay Area. The organization is a section 501(c)(3) nonprofit that was created by the San Francisco Chamber of Commerce in 1979. It is located on Montgomery Street in San Francisco.

== Class of 2024 ==
- Patrick Marleau
- Brian Sabean
- John Taylor
- Jenny Thompson
- Chris Wondolowski

== Class of 2025 ==
- Alex Morgan
- Joe Rudi
- Eric Wright
- Dr.Harry Edwards
- Mike Montgomery

== 2026 ==
- Jack Clark
- Brandon Crawford
- Eddie Hart
- Missy Franklin Johnson
- Jesse Sapolu

== Inductees ==
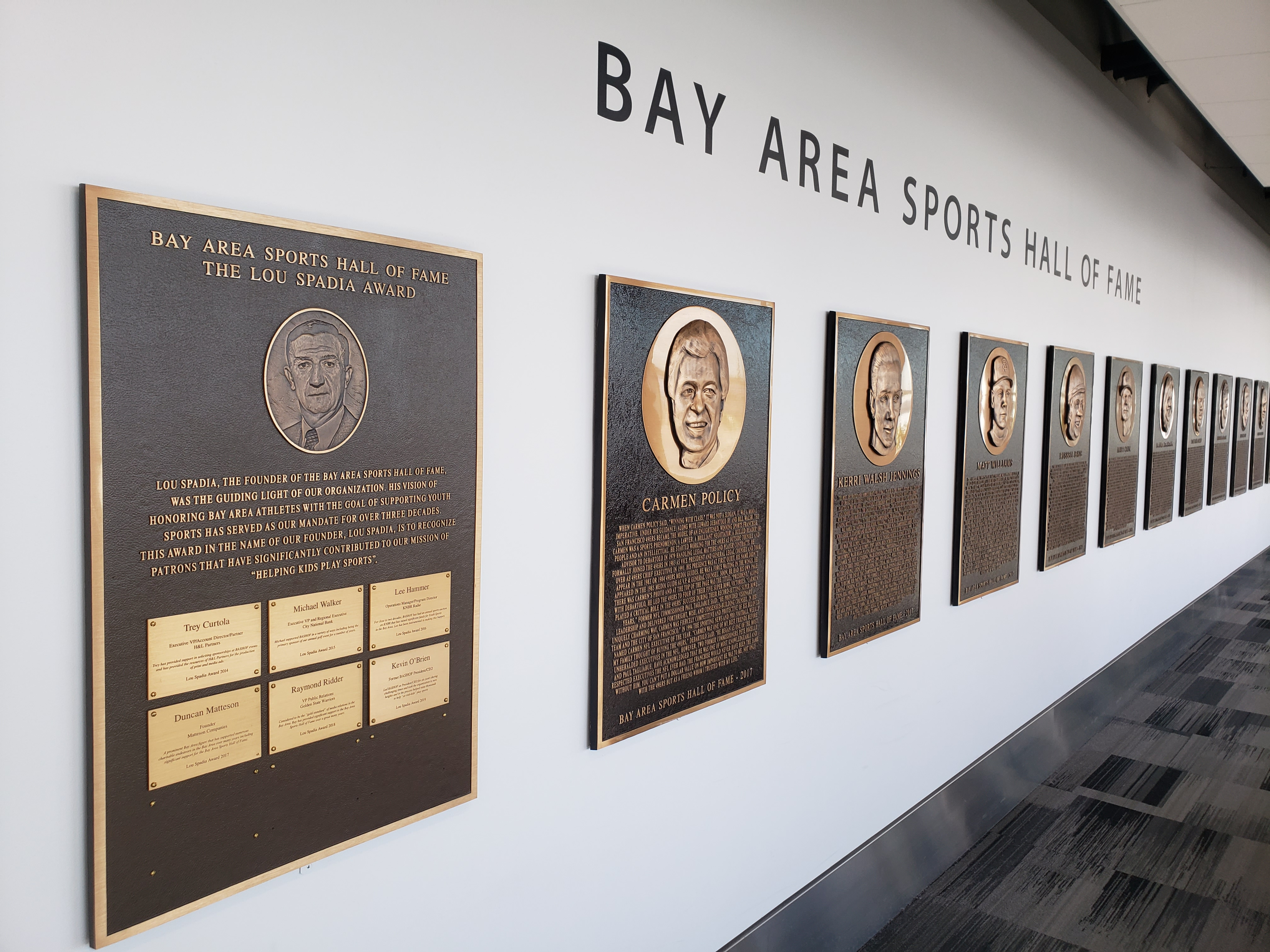
Many Bay Area Sports Hall of Fame plaques are displayed SFO Airport

Year	Name	Sport	Plaque location	Ref
1980	Joe DiMaggio	Baseball	SFO Gate #81	
1980	Hank Luisetti	Basketball	Stanford University	
1980	Willie Mays	Baseball	Oracle Park	
1980	Ernie Nevers	Football	Stanford University	
1980	Bill Russell	Basketball	University of San Francisco	
1981	Frankie Albert	Football	Stanford University	
1981	Lefty Gomez	Baseball	SFO Gate #88	
1981	Bob Mathias	Track and field	Stanford University	
1981	Lefty O'Doul	Baseball	Oracle Park	
1981	Helen Wills	Tennis	University of California, Berkeley	
1982	Don Budge	Tennis	Berkeley Tennis Club	
1982	Joe Cronin	Baseball	Sacred Heart Cathedral Preparatory	
1982	Ernie Lombardi	Baseball	Oakland Coliseum	
1982	Juan Marichal	Baseball	Oracle Park	
1982	Hugh McElhenny	Football	Candlestick Park	
1983	James J. Corbett	Boxing	The Olympic Club	
1983	Ann Curtis	Swimming	University of California, Berkeley	
1983	Jackie Jensen	Baseball	University of California, Berkeley	
1983	Ollie Matson	Football	University of San Francisco	
1983	Frank Robinson	Baseball	Oakland Coliseum	
1984	Helen Jacobs	Tennis	University of California, Berkeley	
1984	Pete Newell	Basketball	University of California, Berkeley	
1984	Mark Spitz	Swimming	Santa Clara Swim Club	
1984	Ken Venturi	Golf	SFO Gate #77A	
1984	Pop Warner	Football	Stanford University	
1985	Johnny Longden	Horse racing	Bay Meadows	
1985	Alice Marble	Tennis	Golden Gate Park	
1985	Gino Marchetti	Football	University of San Francisco	
1985	Leo Nomellini	Football	Candlestick Park	
1985	Buck Shaw	Football	Santa Clara University	
1986	Harry Heilmann	Baseball	Sacred Heart Cathedral Preparatory	
1986	K. C. Jones	Basketball	University of San Francisco	
1986	Jim Otto	Football	Oakland Coliseum	
1986	Joe Perry	Football	Candlestick Park	
1986	Don Schollander	Swimming	Santa Clara Swim Club	
1987	Sam Chapman	Baseball	University of California, Berkeley	
1987	Donna de Varona	Swimming	Santa Clara Swim Club	
1987	Willie McCovey	Baseball	Oracle Park	
1987	O. J. Simpson	Football	Candlestick Park	
1987	Pappy Waldorf	Football	University of California, Berkeley	
1988	Max Baer	Boxing	Livermore, California	
1988	Rick Barry	Basketball	Oakland Coliseum	
1988	John Brodie	Football	Stanford University	
1988	Nate Thurmond	Basketball	Oakland Coliseum	
1988	Y. A. Tittle	Football	Candlestick Park	
1989	George Blanda	Football	Oakland Coliseum	
1989	Tony Lazzeri	Baseball	Jackson Playground	
1989	John Naber	Swimming	Woodside High School	
1989	Jim Pollard	Basketball	Stanford University	
1989	Willie Stargell	Baseball	Oakland Coliseum	
1990	Fred Biletnikoff	Football	Oakland Coliseum	
1990	Orlando Cepeda	Baseball	Oracle Park	
1990	Catfish Hunter	Baseball	Oakland Coliseum	
1990	Jimmy Johnson	Football	Candlestick Park	
1990	Tony Lema	Golf	San Leandro Golf Course	
1991	John Madden	Football	SFO Gate #85	
1991	Billy Martin	Baseball	Oakland Coliseum	
1991	Joe Morgan	Baseball	Oakland Coliseum	
1991	Bob St. Clair	Football	University of San Francisco	
1992	Dick Bartell	Baseball	Oakland Coliseum	
1992	Dom DiMaggio	Baseball	SFO Gate #76	
1992	Peggy Fleming	Figure skating	Saint Francis Hospital, Center for Sports Medicine	
1992	Jim Plunkett	Football	Stanford University	
1992	Cornelius Warmerdam	Track and field	The Olympic Club	
1993	Al Attles	Basketball	Oakland Coliseum	
1993	Dolph Camilli	Baseball	Sacred Heart Cathedral Preparatory	
1993	Rollie Fingers	Baseball	Oakland Coliseum	
1993	Reggie Jackson	Baseball	Oakland Coliseum	
1994	Caitlyn Jenner (Note: Jenner changed her name due to gender transition in 2015.)	Track and field	San Jose City College	
1994	Slip Madigan	Football	Saint Mary's College	
1994	Bill Rigney	Baseball	Oakland Coliseum	
1994	Bill Walsh	Football	SFO Gate #86	
1995	Vida Blue	Baseball	Oracle Park	
1995	Lee Evans	Track and field	San Jose State University	
1995	Curt Flood	Baseball	Oakland Coliseum	
1995	Eddie Joost	Baseball	SFO Gate #83	
1996	Don Barksdale	Basketball	Oakland Coliseum	
1996	John Henry Johnson	Football	Saint Mary's College	
1996	Vada Pinson	Baseball	Oakland Coliseum	
1996	Gene Upshaw	Football	SFO Gate #84	
1997	Dan Fouts	Football	St. Ignatius College Preparatory	
1997	John Ralston	Football	SFO Gate #86	
1997	Chuck Taylor	Football	Stanford University	
1997	George Yardley	Basketball	Stanford University	
1998	Matt Biondi	Swimming	University of California, Berkeley	
1998	Johnny Miller	Golf	The Olympic Club	
1998	Fred Scolari	Basketball	Salesian Boys & Girls Club	
1998	Art Shell	Football	Oakland Coliseum	
1999	Ronnie Lott	Football	SFO Gate #87	
1999	Joe Montana	Football	SFO Gate #87	
1999	Tommie Smith	Track and field	San Jose State University	
1999	Gordy Soltau	Football	SFO Gate #88	
1999	Louis Spadia	BASHOF President	Mission High School	
2000	Pablo Morales	Swimming	Stanford University	
2000	Ken Stabler	Football	Oakland Coliseum	
2000	Dave Stewart	Baseball	Oakland Coliseum	
2000	Billy Wilson	Football	SFO Gate #80	
2001	Willie Brown	Football	Oakland Coliseum	
2001	Tom Watson	Golf	Stanford University	
2001	Dave Wilcox	Football	SFO Gate #87	
2001	Phil Woolpert	Basketball	University of San Francisco	
2002	Dennis Eckersley	Baseball	SFO Gate #80	
2002	George Haines	Swimming	Santa Clara Swim Club	
2002	Mary T. Meagher	Swimming	SFO Gate #82	
2002	Lynn Swann	Football	SFO Gate #82	
2003	Rosemary Casals	Tennis	SFO Gate #86	
2003	John Elway	Football	Stanford University	
2003	Tom Meschery	Basketball	SFO Gate #88	
2003	Bill Shoemaker	Horse racing	Golden Gate Fields	
2004	Joe Kapp	Football	SFO Gate #88	
2004	Eddie LeBaron	Football	SFO Gate #87	
2004	Summer Sanders	Swimming	SFO Gate #80	
2004	Kristi Yamaguchi	Figure skating	SFO Gate #77	
2005	Dick Bass	Football	SFO Gate #80	
2005	John McEnroe	Tennis	SFO Gate #80	
2005	Steve Young	Football	SFO Gate #88	
2006	Dick Gould	Tennis	SFO Gate #84	
2006	Ted Hendricks	Football	SFO Gate #85	
2006	Payton Jordan	Track and field	SFO Gate #84	
2006	Chris Mullin	Basketball	SFO Gate #85	
2007	Jennifer Azzi	Basketball	SFO Gate #90	
2007	Will Clark	Baseball	SFO Gate #80	
2007	Jerry Coleman	Baseball	SFO Gate #85	
2007	Jerry Rice	Football	Candlestick Park	
2008	Roger Craig	Football	Candlestick Park	
2008	Edward J. DeBartolo Jr.	Football	SFO Gate #80	
2008	Rick DeMont	Swimming	SFO Gate #87	
2008	Ray Guy	Football	SFO Gate #80	
2008	Burl Toler	Football	SFO Gate #87	
2009	Dave Casper	Football	SFO Gate #87	
2009	Billie Jean King	Tennis	SFO Gate #87	
2009	Craig Morton	Football	SFO Gate #80	
2009	Gaylord Perry	Baseball	SFO Gate #80	
2010	Brian Boitano	Figure skating	TBA	
2010	Bert Campaneris	Baseball	SFO Gate #80	
2010	Al Davis	Football	SFO Gate #81	
2010	Stephen Negoesco	Soccer	TBA	
2010	R. C. Owens	Football	SFO Gate #81	
2011	Dwight Clark	Football	Levi's Stadium	
2011	Juli Inkster	Golf	BASHOF	
2011	George Seifert	Football	Levi's Stadium	
2011	Sandy Tatum	Golf	TPC Harding Park	
2012	George Archer	Golf	SFO Gate #83	
2012	Tom Flores	Football	SFO Gate #85	
2012	Kevin Johnson	Basketball	SFO Gate #76	
2012	Gene Washington	Football	SFO Gate #77	
2013	Tim Brown	Football	SFO Gate #87	
2013	Walter A. Haas Jr.	Baseball	SFO Gate #84	
2013	Brent Jones	Football	SFO Gate #86	
2013	Dave Righetti	Baseball	SFO Gate #81	
2014	Jim Hines	Track and field	TBA	
2014	Tony La Russa	Baseball	TBA	
2014	Bob Ladouceur	Football	TBA	
2014	Owen Nolan	Hockey	TBA	
2014	Bob Lurie	Baseball	TBA	
2015	Dusty Baker	Baseball	TBA	
2015	Barry Bonds	Baseball	TBA	
2015	Roger Maltbie	Golf	TBA	
2015	Franklin Mieuli	Basketball	TBA	
2015	Jonny Moseley	Skiing	TBA	
2016	Raymond Chester	Football	TBA	
2016	Anne Warner	Swimming	TBA	
2016	Jeff Kent	Baseball	TBA	
2016	Peter Magowan	Baseball	TBA	
2016	Mitch Richmond	Basketball	TBA	
2017	Russell Baze	Horse racing		
2017	Bill Cartwright	Basketball		
2017	Carmen Policy	Football		
2017	Kerri Walsh Jennings	Volleyball		
2017	Matt Williams	Baseball		
2018	Harris Barton	Football		
2018	Matt Cain	Baseball		
2018	Brandi Chastain	Soccer		
2018	Tim Hardaway	Basketball		
2018	John McVay	Football		
2019	Dave Dravecky	Baseball		
2019	Brad Gilbert	Tennis		
2019	Jason Kidd	Basketball		
2019	Keena Turner	Football		
2019	Tara VanDerveer	Basketball		
2021	Bruce Bochy	Baseball		
2021	Paul Cayard	Sailing		
2021	Natalie Coughlin	Swimming		
2021	Rickey Henderson	Baseball		
2021	Bryant Young	Football		
2023	Julie Foudy	Soccer		
2023	Buster Posey	Baseball		
2023	Gary Payton	Basketball		
2023	Andre Ward	Boxing		
2023	Patrick Willis	Football		
