= Alumni Baseball Diamond =

Baseball stadium

Coordinates: 41°9′49″N 73°15′30″W

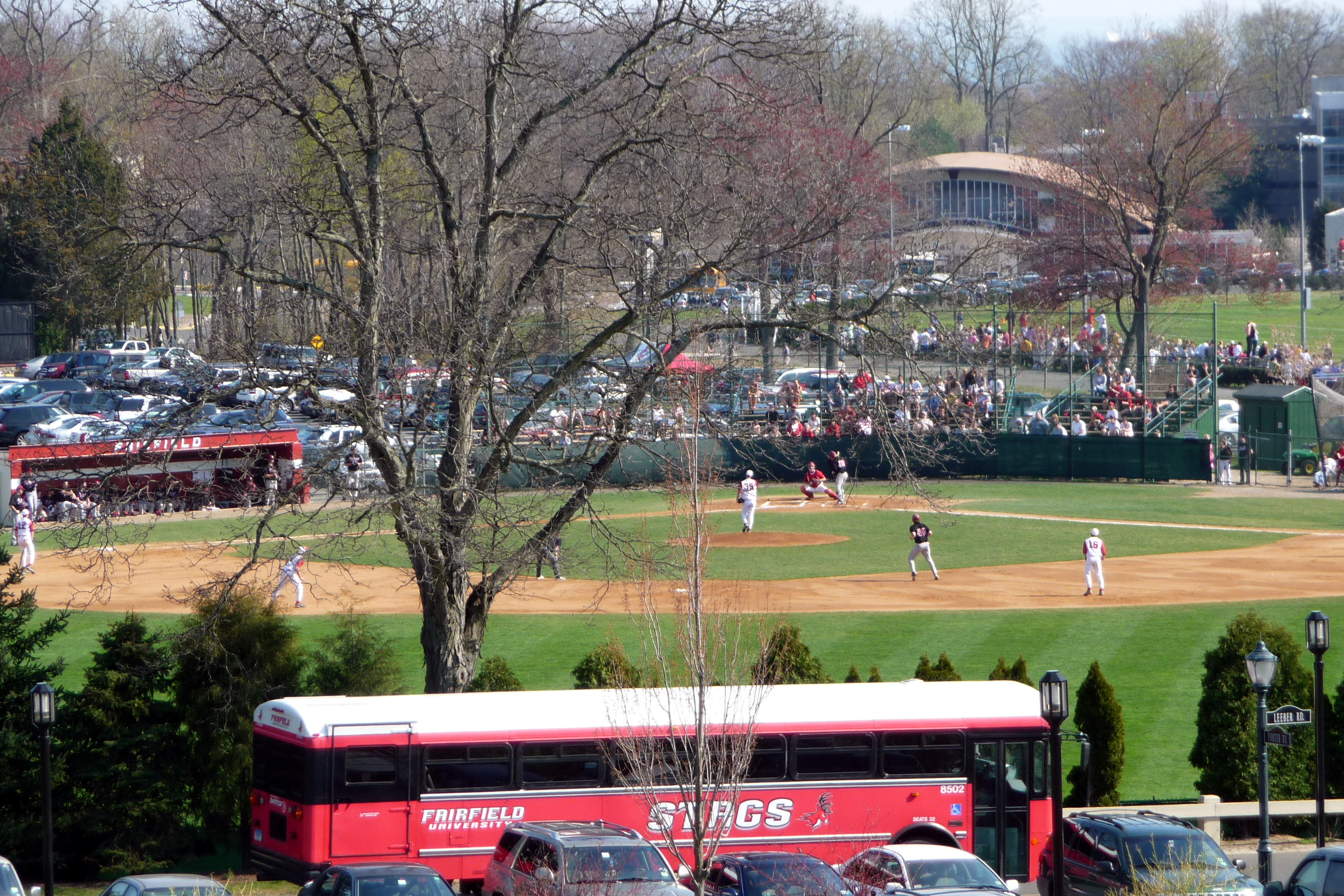
- Interactive map of Alumni Baseball Diamond
- Location: Fairfield University; Fairfield, Connecticut
- Owner: Fairfield University
- Operator: Fairfield University
- Capacity: 1,000
- Surface: Natural grass
- Field size: Left field - 330 ft Center field - 400 ft Right field - 330 ft

Construction
- Opened: 1951

Tenants
- Fairfield Stags (NCAA); Fairfield Stallions (NECBL) (1994)

Alumni Baseball Diamond is a baseball stadium in Fairfield, Connecticut. It opened in 1951 and is currently the home field of the Fairfield Stags baseball team representing Fairfield University.

Former Major League Baseball player Keefe Cato of the Cincinnati Reds pitched on Alumni Baseball Diamond for the Fairfield Stags from 1976 to 1979 where he set 11 all-time program records.

Alumni Baseball Diamond also was the home field of the Fairfield Stallions of the New England Collegiate Baseball League during the inaugural 1994 NECBL season. Major League Baseball player Joe Nathan of the Minnesota Twins pitched on Alumni Baseball Diamond for the Fairfield Stallions in 1994.

The field dimensions are 330 feet down the lines, 400 feet to center field and 370 feet in the power alleys. The facility includes batting cages and bullpens for both teams.

== See also ==
- List of NCAA Division I baseball venues
