= Tuckahoe Union Free School District =

School district in the U.S. state of New York

The Tuckahoe Union Free School District is headquartered in the town of Eastchester, in Westchester County, New York, and serves portions of Eastchester and Tuckahoe.

It operates three schools: William E. Cottle School (elementary), Tuckahoe Middle School, and Tuckahoe High School. For the 2022-23 school year, these three schools had 1,095 students collectively enrolled.

== History ==
Carl Albano became the superintendent in 2016. He later, in January–March 2019, complained to the New York state comptrollers' office over a proposed land deal with the Eastchester government made by the school board. Albano planned to end his term in June 2020, but he decided instead to leave on Tuesday December 3, 2019. Anne Goodman became superintendent, and then was formally hired as superintendent in April 2020.
