= Fairfield Stags baseball =

Fairfield Stags
- 2026 Fairfield Stags baseball team
- Founded: 1951
- University: Fairfield University
- Head coach: Bill Currier (15th season)
- Conference: Metro
- Location: Fairfield, Connecticut
- Home stadium: Alumni Baseball Diamond (capacity: 1,000)
- Nickname: Stags
- Colors: Red

NCAA tournament appearances
- 2016, 2021, 2025

Conference tournament champions
- 1977, 2016, 2025

Conference regular season champions
- 1983, 1991, 1993, 1997, 2016, 2017, 2021, 2022, 2023, 2024

The Fairfield Stags baseball team is the college baseball team representing Fairfield University located in Fairfield, Connecticut. Fairfield competes in the Metro Conference of NCAA Division I and plays their home games at the Alumni Baseball Diamond on the campus of Fairfield University. The Stags were Metro Conference Champions in 1983, 1991, 1993 and 2016. Fairfield is currently coached by 3 time America East Coach of the Year and 2 time MAAC Coach of the Year Bill Currier.

== History ==
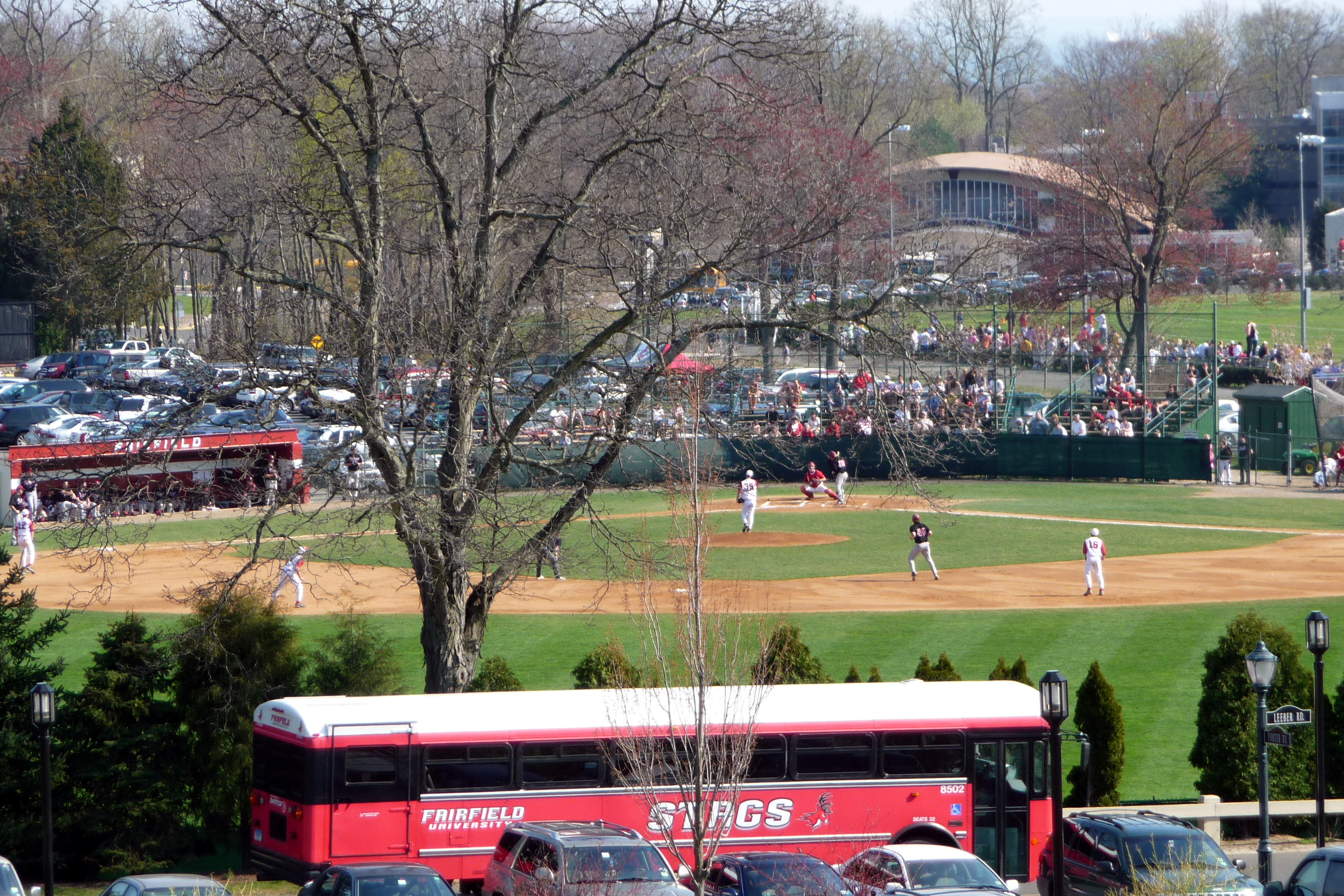
Alumni Baseball Diamond

Fairfield fielded its first varsity baseball team in 1951, winning 7 of 12 games. The Stags, coached by Don Cook, made the first of three straight trips to the ECAC New England Tournament in 1977, defeating defending champion University of Maine. The team was MAAC South Champions in 1983, 1991, 1993, 1995 and 1997. In 2016, Fairfield won the MAAC regular season and tournament championships to advance to the Lubbock Super Regional of the 2016 NCAA Division I baseball tournament.

Individually, Anthony Hajjar was named a 2010 Louisville Slugger Freshman All-American; Peter Allen was named to the 2008 Brooks Wallace Player of the Year Watch List following his program record setting season in 2007, in which he was ranked nationally in doubles, batting average, and slugging percentage; and Mike Pike was named a 1993 Mizuno Freshman All-American.

Keefe Cato holds several school pitching records, including six career shutouts, 21 wins, and a 2.25 ERA. Cato was selected by the Cincinnati Reds in the second round of the 1979 Major League Baseball draft. He became the first Fairfield athlete to play in a top level major professional sport when he debuted for the Reds in 1983. Rob Gariano, who surpassed Cato's 31-year record for career strikeouts, was drafted in the 36th round of the 2010 Major League Baseball draft by the San Diego Padres.

== Fairfield in the NCAA Tournament ==
Year	Record	Pct	Notes
2016	0–2	.000	Lubbock Regional
2021	2–2	.500	Austin Regional
2025	0–2	.000	Conway Regional
TOTALS	2–6	.250	

== Head coaches ==
Years	Coach	W-L-T	Pct.
Joe Yabrosky	1951–56	26–28	.481
James Hanrahan	1957	1–11	.083
Frank Feroleto	1958–63	24–50–3	.331
Jack Redway	1964–65	4–31–1	.125
Don Cook	1966–84	235–273	.463
John Slosar	1985–2011	441–597–7	.425
Bill Currier	2012–present	356–289	.552

== Awards ==
=== Academic All-Americans ===
- Mike Caruso (3rd Team, 2021)

=== All-Americans ===
- Charlie Pagliarini (3rd Team, 2023)
- Anthony Hajjar (Freshman, 2010)
- Mike Pike (Freshman, 1993)

=== All-Northeast ===
- Charlie Pagliarini (Player of the Year, 2023)
- Mike Handel (2nd Team, 2021)
- Jake Noviello (2nd Team, 2021)
- Jake Salpietro (1st Team, 2016)
- Ryan Plourde (2nd Team, 2014)
- Peter Allen (2007)
- Dan Krines (2000)

=== NEIBA All-Stars ===
- Charlie Pagliarini (Player of the Year, 2023)
- Jack Gethings (2019)
- Gavin Wallace (Pitcher of the Year, 2017)
- Jake Salpietro (2014, 2016)
- Ryan Plourde (2013, 2014)
- Scott Warwick (2012)
- Tucker Nathans (2010, 2011)
- Peter Allen (2007)
- Ryan Holsten (2001)
- Jon Novalis (2001)
- Dan Krines (2000)
- Bill McMahon (1993)
- Luis Garcia (1991, 1993)

=== League Player of the Year ===
- Charlie Pagliarini (MAAC, 2023)
- Mike Caruso (MAAC, 2021)
- Jack Gethings (MAAC, 2019)
- Adam Samuelian (MAAC South, 1997)
- Mike Pike (MAAC South, 1996)

=== League Rookie of the Year ===
- Anthony Hajjar (MAAC, 2010)
- Tom Lopusznick (MAAC South, 1997)
- Jared DeCore (MAAC South, 1996)
- Jarrod Jackette (MAAC South, 1994)

=== League Coach of the Year ===
- Bill Currier (MAAC, 2012, 2016, 2021)
- John Slosar (MAAC South, 1991, 1994, 1997)

== All-Time statistic leaders ==
=== Career batting leaders ===
- Batting Average (min. 200 AB): Tom Finch (.358, 1969–71)
- Hits Tucker Nathans (263, 2008–2011)
- Hits Jack Gethings (271, 2016-2019)
- Home Runs: Tom Lopusznick (35, 1997–2000)
- RBI: Anthony Boselli 365 2017- 2019)
- Runs Scored: Jack Gethings (170, 2016-2019)
- Tom Lopusznick (142, 1997–2000)
- Stolen Bases: Bill Barnes (122, 1976–79)

=== Single season batting leaders ===
- Batting Average: Luis Garcia (.423, 1991)
- Hits: Anthony Hajjar (76, 2010)
- Hits Jack Gethings (88, 2019)
- Home Runs: Charlie Pagliarini (24, 2023)
- RBI: Charlie Pagliarini (97, 2023)
- Runs Scored: Bill McMahon (49, 1993)
- Stolen Bases: Bill Barnes (37, 1978)
- Doubles: Peter Allen (23, 2007)
- Triples : Jack Gethings (7, 2019)

=== Longest hitting streaks ===
- Ryan Bittner (18g, 4/15/00-5/21/00)
- Mike Svab (18g, 3/28/90-4/24/90)
- Jack Gethings (25g, 2/24/19-3/30/19)

=== Career pitching leaders ===
- Complete games: Keefe Cato (24, 1977–79)
- ERA: Keefe Cato (2.25, 1977–79)
- Innings pitched: Rob Gariano (323.1, 2007–10)
- Saves: Scott Larkin (19, 1990–93)
- Strikeouts: Rob Gariano (293, 2007–10)
- Wins: Keefe Cato (21, 1977–79)

=== Single season pitching leaders ===
- Complete games: Keefe Cato (11, 1979)
- ERA (min. 25 IP): Al Gabriele (0.00, 31.2 IP, 1971) Kevin Kelleher (0.00, 30.2 IP, 1975)
- Innings pitched: Dan Krines (103.2, 2000)
- Saves: Scott Larkin (10, 1992)
- Strikeouts: Keefe Cato (98, 1979)
- Wins: Jake Noviello (9, 2021) Mike Sansone (2021)

=== No-hitters ===
- Joe Cizynski (9 innings vs. Columbia, 4/6/77)
- Keefe Cato (7 innings vs. Maine, 4/8/78)
- Rich Clemens (7 innings vs. Hartford, 4/14/85)

== Stags in the MLB draft ==
The following Stag players were selected in the Major League Baseball draft:

Player	Year	Round	Team	Position
Trey McLoughlin	2021	16	New York Mets	RHP
Justin Guerrera	2021	20	New York Mets	SS
Austin Pope	2019	15	Arizona Diamondbacks	RHP
Gavin Wallace	2017	15	Pittsburgh Pirates	RHP
Mike Wallace	2015	30	Pittsburgh Pirates	RHP
Mark Bordonaro	2012	25	Seattle Mariners	RHP
Rob Gariano	2010	36	San Diego Padres	RHP
Ryan Holsten	2001	22	Arizona Diamondbacks	RHP
Drew Larned	1998	23	Boston Red Sox	C
James Manias	1996	25	Tampa Bay Rays	LHP
William Albino	1982	20	Cincinnati Reds	OF
Alberto Zappala	1982	30	Minnesota Twins	INF
Ron Carapezzi	1981	31	Cincinnati Reds	3B
Keefe Cato	1979	2	Cincinnati Reds	RHP
Mike Behudian	1979	14	Texas Rangers	2B
Frank Gill	1977	12	Boston Red Sox	2B
Robert Kownacki	1976	8	Los Angeles Dodgers	SS
Michael Yates	1973	23	Atlanta Braves	RHP
Thomas Finch	1971	14	Minnesota Twins	C
Stan Norman	1970	26	Cincinnati Reds	OF

== See also ==
- List of NCAA Division I baseball programs
- Fairfield Stags
