= Austin Pope =

American baseball player (born 1998)

Algodoneros de Unión Laguna – No. 40
- Pitcher
- Born: October 26, 1998 (age 27); White Plains, New York, U.S.
- Bats: Right Throws: Right

MLB debut
- September 25, 2025, for the Arizona Diamondbacks

MLB statistics (through 2025 season)
- Win–loss record: 0–0
- Earned run average: 0.00
- Strikeouts: 1
- Stats at Baseball Reference

Teams
- Arizona Diamondbacks (2025)

Austin Joseph Pope (born October 26, 1998) is an American professional baseball pitcher for the Algodoneros de Unión Laguna of the Mexican League. He has previously played in Major League Baseball (MLB) for the Arizona Diamondbacks.

== Amateur career ==
A native of White Plains, New York, Pope graduated from Tuckahoe High School in Eastchester, New York, in 2016. He attended Fairfield University, where he played college baseball for the Fairfield Stags. In 2018, he played collegiate summer baseball with the Bourne Braves of the Cape Cod Baseball League.

== Professional career ==
=== Arizona Diamondbacks ===
Pope was selected by the Arizona Diamondbacks in the 15th round of the 2019 Major League Baseball draft. Pope split his first professional season between the rookie-level Arizona League Diamondbacks and rookie-level Missoula Osprey. He did not play in a game in 2020 due to the cancellation of the minor league season because of the COVID-19 pandemic.

Pope returned to action in 2021 with the Single-A Visalia Rawhide and High-A Hillsboro Hops. In 26 appearances (15 starts) split between the two affiliates, he struggled to a 1-10 record and 7.50 ERA with 102 strikeouts and one save across 90 innings pitched. Pope split the 2022 campaign between the rookie-level Arizona Complex League Diamondbacks, Hillsboro, and the Double-A Amarillo Sod Poodles, accumulating a 4-2 record and 6.18 ERA with 47 strikeouts and three saves across 43 2/3 innings pitched.

In 2023, Pope made 48 appearances out of the bullpen split between Amarillo and the Triple-A Reno Aces, for whom he logged a cumulative 6-0 record and 3.64 ERA with 84 strikeouts and four saves across 66 2/3 innings of work. He returned to Reno for the 2024 campaign, registering a 6-5 record and 5.72 ERA with 70 strikeouts and one save across 56 2/3 innings pitched.

Pope began the 2025 season with Reno, and also made six appearances for the ACL Diamondbacks; in 25 outings for Reno, he posted a 0-3 record and 4.60 ERA with 34 strikeouts across 29 1/3 innings of work. On September 21, 2025, Pope was selected to the 40-man roster and promoted to the major leagues for the first time. He made his MLB debut four days later against the Los Angeles Dodgers, throwing one strikeout over two scoreless innings in an 0–8 loss. Pope was sent down to the ACL Diamondbacks the following day. On November 6, Pope was removed from the 40-man roster and sent outright to Reno. He elected free agency the same day.

=== Atlanta Braves ===
On November 30, 2025, Pope signed a minor league contract with the Atlanta Braves. He made nine appearances (including one start) for the Triple-A Gwinnett Stripers, accumulating a 1-0 record and 7.50 ERA with five strikeouts and one save over 12 innings of work. On May 4, 2026, Pope was released by the Braves organization.

=== Algodoneros de Unión Laguna ===
On May 19, 2026, Pope signed with the Algodoneros de Unión Laguna of the Mexican League.
