= Tuckahoe High School =

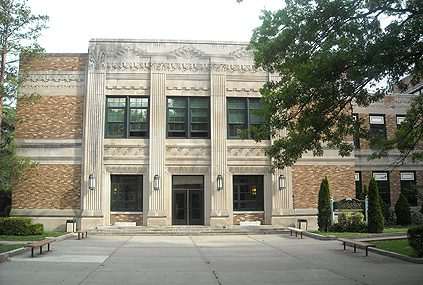

Location
- 65 Siwanoy Boulevard, Eastchester, New York; 40°56′34″N 73°48′44″W

Information
- School type: Public
- School district: Tuckahoe Union Free School District
- Principal: Christopher Fiore (2025-Present)
- Staff: 17.17 (FTE)
- Grades: 9–12
- Enrollment: 301 (2022–23)
- Student to teacher ratio: 16.66
- Colors: Orange and Black
- Team name: Tigers
- Tuckahoe High School
- U.S. National Register of Historic Places
- New York State Register of Historic Places
- Area: 5.5 acres (2.2 ha)
- Built: 1930
- Architect: Knappe & Morris
- Architectural style: Art Deco
- NRHP reference No.: 10000045
- NYSRHP No.: 11903.000055

Significant dates
- Added to NRHP: February 24, 2010
- Designated NYSRHP: January 6, 2010

Tuckahoe High School is a historic high school located in Eastchester, New York. It was built in 1930–31, and is a three-story brick building with Aztec-inspired cast stone trim in the Art Deco style. The front facade is composed of a three-story, nine bay central pavilion, deeply recessed two-story, five bay connecting wings, and projecting, identical, two-story, five bay end pavilions.

It was added to the National Register of Historic Places in 2010.

== Notable alumni ==
- Al Carapella, professional football player
- David Osit, filmmaker
- Austin Pope, baseball player

== See also ==
- National Register of Historic Places listings in southern Westchester County, New York
