= Gordy Soltau =

American football player (1925–2014)

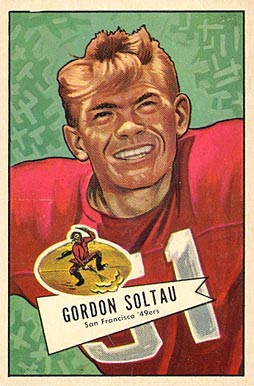
- Soltau on a 1952 Bowman football card

No. 51, 82
- Positions: Wide receiver, placekicker

Personal information
- Born: January 25, 1925; Duluth, Minnesota, U.S.
- Died: October 26, 2014 (aged 89); Santa Clara, California, U.S.
- Listed height: 6 ft 2 in (1.88 m)
- Listed weight: 195 lb (88 kg)

Career information
- High school: Central (Duluth)
- College: Minnesota (1946–1949)
- NFL draft: 1950: 3rd round, 30th overall pick

Career history
- San Francisco 49ers (1950–1958)

Awards and highlights
- First-team All-Pro (1952); Second-team All-Pro (1953); 3× Pro Bowl (1951–1953); 2× NFL scoring leader (1952–1953); San Francisco 49ers Hall of Fame

Career NFL statistics
- Receptions: 249
- Receiving yards: 3,487
- Touchdowns: 25
- Field goals made: 70
- Field goal attempts: 139
- Field goal %: 50.4
- Stats at Pro Football Reference

Gordon Leroy Soltau (January 25, 1925 – October 26, 2014) was an American professional football player who was a wide receiver for nine seasons with the San Francisco 49ers of the National Football League (NFL). He played college football for the Minnesota Golden Gophers.

== Early life ==
Soltau served in the United States Navy as World War II broke out when he was graduating high school. He was part of the first class of Frogman that specialized in underwater demolition, seeing action in the Pacific and Europe as part of the Office of Strategic Services. After the war ended in 1945, he attended the University of Minnesota, as coached by Bernie Bierman that saw him develop skills as receiver, placekicker and defender.

== Football career ==
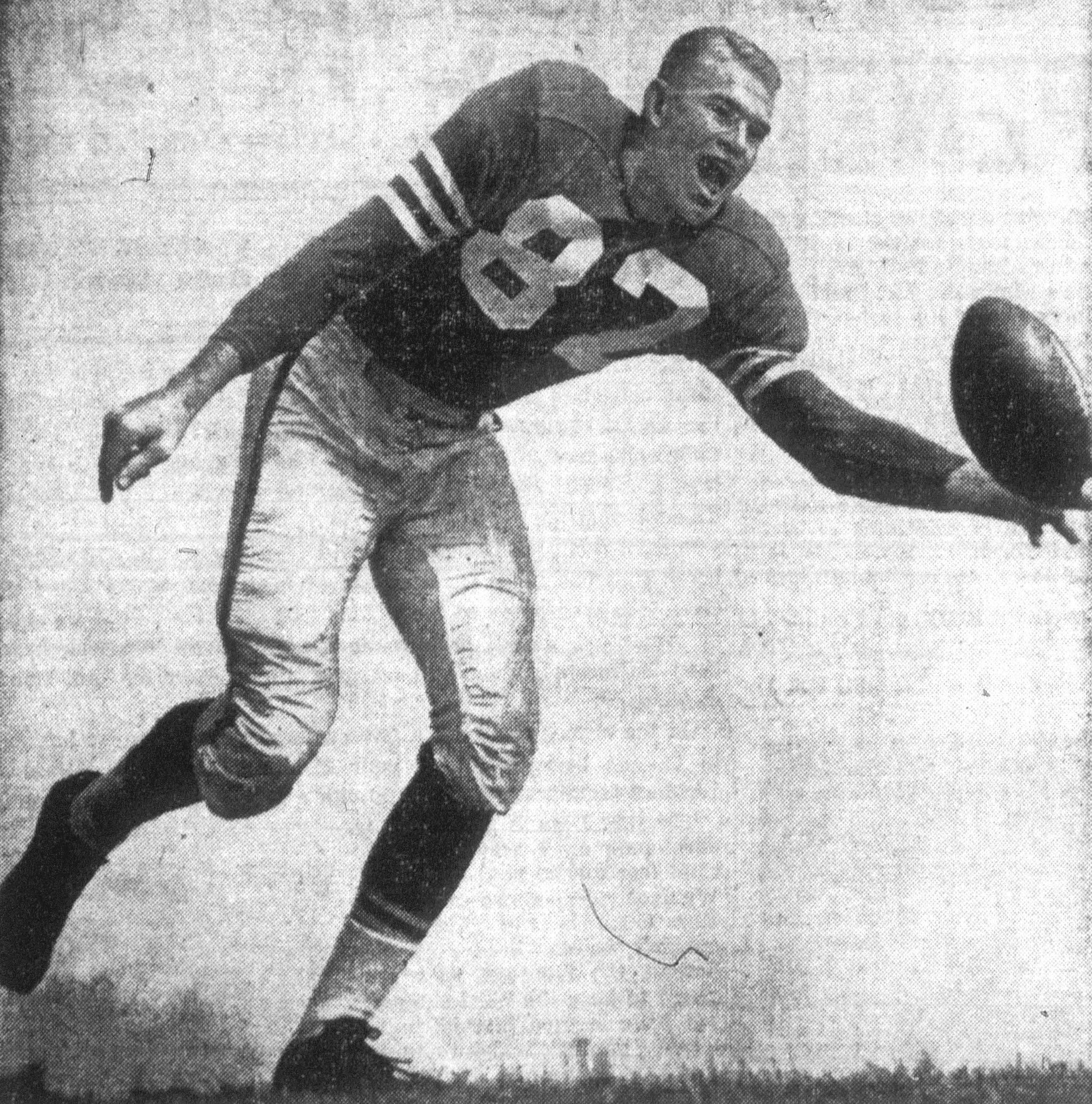
Soltau, circa 1953

25 years old at the time of the 1950 draft, Soltau was a third-round pick (30th overall) by the Green Bay Packers, but he was traded to the Cleveland Browns for Joe Spencer. He was then asked if he wanted to be traded to the San Francisco 49ers to play, which he accepted. As per the time, Soltau was used as both receiver and kicker during his career. He caught fourteen passes for 170 yards with one touchdown in his rookie season of 1950 while making 26-of-28 extra points and making four of eight field goals. He made the Pro Bowl the following year with more production given, as he caught a career high 59 passes for 826 yards for seven touchdowns, although he was just 6 of 18 on field goals. He scored 26 points in a victory over the Rams that year, which was the 49er single game scoring record that stood for 39 years until broken by Jerry Rice. He caught 55 passes for 774 yards with seven touchdowns in his third year for another Pro Bowl year to go with an All-Pro selection, which saw him catch 10 passes for 190 yards against the Giants. He had his best season as a kicker on extra points in 1953, kicking 48 of 49 extra points (both career and league highs) while having a career best field goal percentage of 66.7 in 10 made kicks of 15 attempts. He was the first player with 6+ touchdowns and 10+ field goals made in the same season. He had his final Pro Bowl year with 43 catches for 620 yards and six touchdowns.

The 1954 season saw him catch 22 passes for 316 yards with two touchdowns. He caught 56 combined passes in his next four seasons for two touchdowns while having his moments kicking that ranged from making all 33 extra points in 1957 to going 3-of-12 in field goals in 1955 and closing his career with eight field goals made in 21 attempts. He made the postseason once during the 1957 season, as the Niners were tied with the Detroit Lions for the right to play for the Championship Game. He was successful on all three extra points and two field goals as the Niners jumped to a 27-7 lead in the third quarter. However, the Niners gave up 24 unanswered points to lose 31-27. In his career, he had 249 receptions for 3,487 yards and 25 touchdowns while being successful on 70 field goals and 284 extra points. He was one of three players in NFL history to score 25 touchdowns and make 70 field goals in their career.

== Union career ==
During this time in professional football, most players had to have an outside job to survive the off-season. Soltau, in 1954, went to work as a sales representative for the Schwabacher Brothers, a San Francisco printing, stationery and office supply company. The firm was eventually bought out by Diamond International, makers of Diamond matches, packaging material, folding cartons and corrugated. Soltau rose to vice president in charge of sales for the West Coast, and was executive vice president when he retired.

Soltau was the first player representative for the 49ers, when there were only 12 teams in the league at the time. Many players had some issues with the owners and wanted to start a "Players Association". The owners objected, particularly the ones from the oldest teams in the league, even threatening to cut players who participated. However, a representative from each of the six younger teams in the league had their first meeting in Philadelphia that consisted of members from the Detroit Lions, Chicago Bears, Washington Redskins, New York Giants, and the 49ers as represented by Soltau. Bert Bell, commissioner of the league, was invited but didn't come. There were three major issues on the table that the players wanted to discuss with the league: a pension plan, pay for exhibition games during training and playing shoes (at the time, players furnished their own shoes).

The players started a Players Association, with dues of $25.00 a year per player. Soltau persuaded 49ers owner Tony Morabito to deduct it from the players' checks. The rest of the teams refused, and the representatives had to chase players who hadn't paid around the locker room, in their favorite bar or in the parking lot to collect the $25.00. It took four years to get the owners to talk about the issues, and in 1962, the owners decided to put money in a pension plan. The Players Association gradually disintegrated. However, Vic Matland, a close friend to Steelers owner Art Rooney came up with a plan/philosophy, "Caring For Kids" that owners could live with. The Players Association ultimately changed to "The NFL Alumni Association". Soltau played a major role along with Alyn Beals, Eddie Forest, Bruce Bosley and Norm Standee in establishing The Northern California Chapter of the NFL Alumni Association.

On Monday June 16, 2008, Gordy Soltau Day was proclaimed by San Francisco Mayor Gavin Newsom.

== After football ==
In 1959, Soltau retired from the 49ers and was later inducted into the Bay Area Sports Hall of Fame. He was a color commentator for ten years with Bob Fouts for CBS. His next gig was five years at KSFO with Lon Simmons. He was an avid golfer and played in ten of Bing Crosby's Celebrity Pro-Ams at Pebble Beach.

== NFL career statistics ==
Legend
	Led the league
**Bold**	Career high

=== Regular season ===
Year	Team	Games		Receiving					Kicking							
Year	Team	GP	GS	Rec	Yds	Avg	Lng	TD	FGM	FGA	%	LNG	XPM	XPA	%	PTS
1950	SF	**12**	7	14	170	12.1	28	1	4	8	50.0	–	26	28	92.9	44
1951	SF	**12**	11	**59**	**826**	14.0	48	**7**	6	18	33.3	–	30	32	93.8	90
1952	SF	**12**	11	58	774	14.1	49	**7**	6	12	50.0	–	34	36	94.4	94
1953	SF	**12**	**12**	43	620	14.4	**54**	6	10	15	**66.7**	–	**48**	**49**	98.0	**114**
1954	SF	11	7	22	316	14.4	42	2	11	18	61.1	–	31	33	93.9	76
1955	SF	**12**	10	26	358	13.8	36	1	3	12	25.0	–	27	30	90.0	42
1956	SF	**12**	9	18	299	**16.6**	33	1	**13**	**30**	65.0	–	26	28	92.9	71
1957	SF	**12**	5	5	47	9.4	18	0	9	15	60.0	–	33	33	**100.0**	60
1958	SF	**12**	2	7	77	11.0	22	0	8	21	38.1	–	29	34	85.3	53
Career		107	74	249	3,487	14.0	54	25	70	139	50.4	42	284	303	93.7	644

== Personal life ==
Soltau lived with his wife, Nancy, in Menlo Park, California. Soltau died on October 26, 2014 at the age of 89, and was survived by his wife and three children.
