= Louis Spadia =

Personal information
- Born: January 11, 1921; San Francisco, California, U.S.
- Died: February 17, 2013 (aged 92); San Francisco, California, U.S.

Career information
- High school: Mission

Career history
- San Francisco 49ers (1946) Special assistant/ticket manager; San Francisco 49ers (1947) Equipment manager; San Francisco 49ers (1948–1976) General manager; San Francisco 49ers (1948–1951) Business manager; San Francisco 49ers (1967–1976) Team president; Bay Area Sports Hall of Fame (1979–2003) Founder, CEO, President
- Executive profile at Pro Football Reference

Louis G. Spadia (January 11, 1921 – February 17, 2013) was an American football executive who was the general manager of the San Francisco 49ers from 1948 to 1976. He was also the founder of the Bay Area Sports Hall of Fame.

== Early life and education ==
Louis Spadia was born on January 11, 1921, in San Francisco, California. He went to Mission High School. He played baseball and was a star Second Baseman. He wanted to be a Major League Baseball player but could not because of being drafted into World War II.

== Professional career ==
=== San Francisco 49ers ===
Instead of becoming a baseball player, he worked as a special assistant and ticket manager for the San Francisco 49ers in their inaugural season. In 1947, he was their equipment manager and was promoted in 1948 to be a business manager. He also took over as general manager for John Blackinger in 1948 and remained in the role through 1976. In 1967, he also became the team's president. However, he had been operating head of the franchise long before becoming team president. After the death of team founder Tony Morabito in 1957 his widow, Josephine, inherited the franchise. However, she largely left the 49ers in Spadia's hands and rarely interfered. Spadia retired after 1976.

=== Bay Area Sports Hall of Fame ===
In 1979, he became the founder of the Bay Area Sports Hall of Fame. He served as the president and CEO until 2003. He was inducted into the Hall of Fame in 1999.

== Death ==
Spadia died on February 17, 2013, at the age of 92.
