= Keefe Cato =

American baseball player (born 1958)

- Pitcher
- Born: May 6, 1958 (age 68); Yonkers, New York, U.S.
- Batted: Right Threw: Right

MLB debut
- June 13, 1983, for the Cincinnati Reds

Last MLB appearance
- July 26, 1984, for the Cincinnati Reds

MLB statistics
- Win–loss record: 1–1
- Earned run average: 6.98
- Strikeouts: 15
- Stats at Baseball Reference

Teams
- Cincinnati Reds (1983–1984)

John Keefe Cato (born May 6, 1958) is an American former professional baseball relief pitcher. He played in Major League Baseball (MLB) for the Cincinnati Reds in 1983 and 1984.

== Biography ==
A native of Yonkers, New York, Cato graduated from Fairfield University, where he played college baseball for the Stags and holds many Fairfield pitching records including seven career shutouts and one no-hitter. In 1978, he played collegiate summer baseball with the Harwich Mariners of the Cape Cod Baseball League. He was the first Fairfield athlete to play in a major professional sport on the major league level after being selected by the Cincinnati Reds in the second round of the 1979 Major League Baseball draft.
