= Lowell Wagner =

American football player (1923–2005)

Profile
- Position: Cornerback

Personal information
- Born: August 21, 1923; Gardena, California, U.S.
- Died: September 26, 2005 (aged 82)

Career information
- College: USC

Career history
- 1946–1948: New York Yankees (AAFC)
- 1949–1955: San Francisco 49ers
- Stats at Pro Football Reference

Lowell Wagner (August 21, 1923 – September 26, 2005) was an American professional football player who was a cornerback in the All-America Football Conference (AAFC) and the National Football League (NFL). He played college football for the USC Trojans. Wagner played 11 seasons for the AAFC's New York Yankees (1946–1948) and AAFC and NFL's San Francisco 49ers (1949–1955).

One of Wagner's greatest games was the final game of the 1951 season, when the 49ers beat the Detroit Lions 21-17 at Kezar Stadium. Wagner intercepted three passes, two leading to 49er touchdown drives, and the third stopping a Lions drive in the fourth quarter. The loss knocked the Lions out of the National Conference race and allowed the Los Angeles Rams to win the Conference title.
