= Pete Wismann =

American football player (1922–2023)

- Wismann in 1949

No. 22, 52
- Positions: Center, linebacker

Personal information
- Born: October 9, 1922; St. Louis, Missouri, U.S.
- Died: September 5, 2023 (aged 100)
- Listed height: 6 ft 0 in (1.83 m)
- Listed weight: 215 lb (98 kg)

Career information
- High school: Maplewood-Richmond Heights (Maplewood, Missouri)
- College: Miami (OH) (1942); Washington (1943); Saint Louis (1946-1948)
- NFL draft: 1949: 7th round, 64th overall pick

Career history
- San Francisco 49ers (1949–1952, 1954)

Career NFL/AAFC statistics
- Games played: 48
- Games started: 18
- Interceptions: 4
- Stats at Pro Football Reference

Lawrence William "Pete" Wismann (October 9, 1922 – September 5, 2023) was an American football center and linebacker who played five seasons with the San Francisco 49ers.

== Biography ==
Wismann was born October 9, 1922, in St. Louis. He attended Maplewood High School in Maplewood, Missouri. Wismann played college football at Washington University in St. Louis before the war and at Saint Louis University after serving in the Marine Corps. He also worked as a mason. Wismann died on September 5, 2023, at the age of 100.
