= Joe Arenas =

American football player (1925–2020)

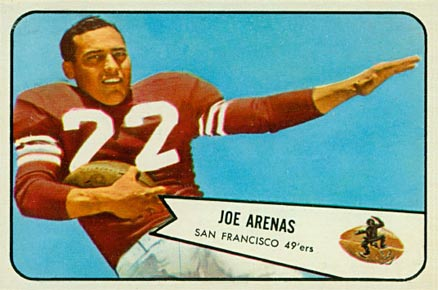
- Arenas on a 1954 Bowman football card

No. 71, 82, 22
- Positions: Halfback, defensive back

Personal information
- Born: December 12, 1925; Cedar Rapids, Iowa, U.S.
- Died: June 30, 2020 (aged 94); Texas, U.S.
- Listed height: 5 ft 11 in (1.80 m)
- Listed weight: 180 lb (82 kg)

Career information
- High school: Lincoln (NE)
- College: Nebraska–Omaha
- NFL draft: 1951: 8th round, 89th overall pick

Career history
- San Francisco 49ers (1951–1957)

Awards and highlights
- Led NFL in kick and punt return yards, 1951

Career NFL statistics
- Rushing yards: 987
- Rushing average: 4.9
- Receptions: 46
- Receiving yards: 675
- Return yards: 4,572
- Total touchdowns: 18
- Stats at Pro Football Reference

Guadalupe Joseph Arenas (December 12, 1925 – June 30, 2020), also known as "Lupe Joe" Arenas and "Little Joe" Arenas, was an American professional football player. He was a halfback and defensive back for the San Francisco 49ers from 1951 to 1957. He was best known as a kickoff and punt returner. His 4,572 career kick and punt return yards was the best in NFL history at the time of his retirement, and his career average of 27.3 yards per kick return remains ninth best in NFL history. Arenas was, along with Tom Fears and Eddie Saenz, among the first Mexican-American players to achieve significant success in the sport of American football.

== Military service ==
Arenas was born in Cedar Rapids, Iowa in 1925. He served in the United States military for four years during and after World War II. He participated in the invasion of Iwo Jima, was wounded with shrapnel and received a Purple Heart decoration. Arenas credited his military background with giving him the mental and physical toughness that led to his success in football.

== University of Nebraska Omaha ==
Arenas did not play football in high school and did not become involved in football until after he was discharged from the military. He later recalled that his introduction to football began after a night of carousing: "We were out partying one night, and my mom said, 'What are you going to do with your life?' That hit me — 'What am I going to do.' I said I was going to school, and from that day forward, I prepared myself to go play basketball for the University of Nebraska. And, by God, I made it." He began his college career playing basketball for the Nebraska Cornhuskers, but he transferred to the University of Nebraska Omaha, then known as Omaha University, so that he could play football. He played college football at Omaha from 1947 to 1950. He was chosen as the most valuable player on Omaha's 1948 football team. During the 1949 season he led Omaha in both rushing and passing yards. Arenas opened the 1950 football season by throwing three touchdown passes in a 33-7 win over Nebraska Wesleyan. Arenas also played basketball at Omaha; he was the team's second leading scorer in 1950 with 144 points on 56 field goals and 32 free throws in 23 games.

== San Francisco 49ers ==
Arenas was drafted 89th overall by the San Francisco 49ers in the 8th round of the 1951 NFL draft. He played seven seasons in San Francisco from 1951 to 1957. On December 16, 1951 he knocked the Detroit Lions out of the NFL division championship with 51-yard punt return. He led the NFL with 814 kick and punt return yards in 1951, and also led the NFL in yards per touch in both 1951 (13.1 yards per touch) and 1955 (11.1 yards per touch).

In December 1956 two long returns by Arenas helped the 49ers beat the Baltimore Colts 30-17. The Associated Press coverage of the game opened by noting, "Little Joe Arenas, who earlier returned a kickoff 96 yards, returned a punt 68 for San Francisco's winning touchdown." After the game, 49ers coach Frank Albert said of Arenas, "He's the greatest clutch artist I've ever seen. He was the difference between the two clubs today." A newspaper columnist in 1957 described Arenas' value to the 49ers:

"Arenas is a valuable man on a pro football team, specifically the 49er team. He is more than a thoroughly dependable player. He is an inspirational holler-guy who can lift flagging spirits; who refuses to be whipped even if the score is top-heavy in the other side's favor. Team devotees feel a sense of complete confidence watching a well kicked ball sail in the direction of Arenas, playing safety. Joe hardly ever bobbles one. On those rare occasions when the spinning ball briefly twists out of his waiting arms, he is on the pellet with the speed of a mongoose."

Arenas was "a popular and capable performer" in his seven years with the 49ers. A columnist for the Oakland Tribune in July 1958 wrote that the 49ers lineup would not be the same without him and added, "Arenas has a spectacular quality which appeals to the customers. He is dead game, possessing in spirit and aggression what he may lack in sheer talent. He is no speedburner, yet last year and the season before he made long runs which brought the audiences to its collective feet."

Arenas announced his retirement from football in September 1958, saying he was quitting to devote full-time to his job as a salesman and public relations man for the coffee company, Schilling & Co. Arenas had been working in the coffee business during the off-season for several years. He compared selling with football in a 1957 interview: "Selling is like football. The buyers are defending, I'm on the offense. It's axiomatic in football for every good offense there is a proper defense — and vice versa. That goes for selling, too." After he announced his retirement, the Oakland Tribune called him "a scrappy little back" who "made up with hustle what he lacked in ability" and became "the most popular player on the 49ers."

In seven years in the NFL, Arenas accumulated 987 rushing yards, 675 passing yards, 774 punt return yards, 3,798 kick return yards, 17 touchdowns, six interceptions. Over the course of his career, he averaged 27.3 yards per kick return, a figure that remains ninth best in NFL history. His 4,572 career kick and punt return yards was the best in NFL history at the time of his retirement; Al Carmichael broke his record in 1958.

After retiring from the 49ers, he covered the team for the San Francisco Call-Bulletin during the 1958 season. In December 1958 Arenas wrote that he had been banned from the 49ers' bench and dressing room for things he had written in his newspaper column. According to Arenas, team owner Vic Morabito claimed that his former teammates "had not appreciated my comments about their playing." In an interview in 1990, Arenas said of his time with the 49ers, "It was something I will always cherish. It was the highlight of my life."

== Later life ==
=== Acquittal on forgery charges ===
In March 1961 the Santa Clara County Sheriff's Department issued an all points bulletin for Arenas after he was charged with forging a business partner's name on a $264 check at a Bank of America branch in San Jose, California. In June 1961 Arenas was ordered to stand trial in San Jose, California on a forgery charge. In November 1961 a San Jose jury acquitted Arenas of the charge. The check had been made out to both Arenas and his partner, and Arenas contended he had authorization from his partner to endorse the check with both names.

=== Coaching ===
For 23 years, from 1963 to 1986, Arenas was an assistant football coach for the Houston Cougars football team under College Football Hall of Fame coach Bill Yeoman. Arenas worked with the receivers at the University of Houston and developed such NFL receiving talents as Riley Odoms and Carl Hilton. Arenas recalled, "I was just fortunate enough to be able to do both with Coach Yeoman. I was part-time for a while, and then the NCAA said you could only have so many coaches, and then I went voluntary for a while." He also worked as a volunteer coach at Rice University from 1987 to 1988. From 1991 until at least 2002, Arenas served as an unpaid volunteer coach with the Ball High School football team in Galveston. Interviewed in 2002, Arenas said, "It's lot of fun. It just keeps me busy. That's the thing, and it's something I like to do. Anytime I can be around young men and help them along, that's good for me."

=== Property management ===
Arenas later worked as a property supervisor at Barney Rapp Realtors, Inc., on Galveston Island in Texas. Arenas retired in 1991, but he continued to "dabble" in property management before finally retiring for good in 1993.

== Family, awards and honors ==
Arenas was married to Maxine Brynston Arenas. The couple had two daughters, Vicki Ritter and Tracey Arenas. His wife died in August 2008 at Webster, Texas. In 2000 Arenas was inducted into the Laredo Latin American International Sports Hall of Fame. Arenas was also profiled in Mario Longoria's 1997 book, "Athletes Remembered: Mexicano/Latino Professional Football Players, 1929–1970." After reviewing Arenas' career, Longoria concludes that the "exclusion" of Arenas from the Pro Football Hall of Fame is "a gross injustice."
