= Ed Henke =

American gridiron football player (1927–2015)

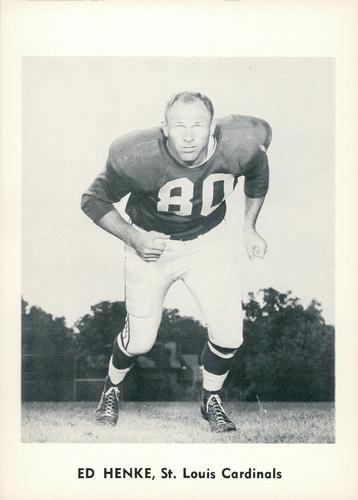

No. 44, 61, 47, 89, 67, 75, 80
- Positions: Defensive end, linebacker, guard

Personal information
- Born: December 13, 1927; Ontario, California, U.S.
- Died: June 28, 2015 (aged 87)
- Listed height: 6 ft 3 in (1.91 m)
- Listed weight: 227 lb (103 kg)

Career information
- High school: Ventura (Ventura, California)
- College: USC (1948)
- NFL draft: 1949: 13th round, 128th overall pick

Career history

Playing
- Los Angeles Dons (1949); Winnipeg Blue Bombers (1950); San Francisco 49ers (1951–1952); Calgary Stampeders (1954–1955); San Francisco 49ers (1956–1960); St. Louis Cardinals (1961–1963)

Coaching
- St. Louis Cardinals (1963) Defensive line coach

Awards and highlights
- Pro Bowl (1952); 2× WIFU All Star: 1950, 54

Career NFL/AAFC statistics
- Games played: 123
- Games started: 97
- Fumble recoveries: 12
- Stats at Pro Football Reference

Edgar Edwin Henke (December 13, 1927 – June 28, 2015) was an American professional football player who was an offensive and defensive lineman in the National Football League (NFL) for the San Francisco 49ers and St. Louis Cardinals. He also played in the All-America Football Conference (AAFC) for the Los Angeles Dons. Henke played college football for the USC Trojans and was selected in the 13th round of the 1949 NFL draft by the Washington Redskins. Henke also played three seasons in the Western Interprovincial Football Union with the Calgary Stampeders and the Winnipeg Blue Bombers, being named an All Star in 1950 and 1954.
