= Bob White (halfback) =

American football player (born 1968)

No. 85, 25, 46, 32
- Position: Halfback

Personal information
- Born: May 25, 1929; Los Angeles, California, U.S.
- Died: March 5, 2011 (aged 81); Southlake, Texas, U.S.
- Listed height: 5 ft 11 in (1.80 m)
- Listed weight: 176 lb (80 kg)

Career information
- High school: Herbert Hoover (Glendale, California)
- College: Stanford
- NFL draft: 1951: 16th round, 184th overall pick

Career history
- San Francisco 49ers (1951–1952); San Francisco 49ers (1955)*; Cleveland Browns (1955); Baltimore Colts (1955)
- * Offseason or practice squad member only
- Stats at Pro Football Reference

Robert William White (May 25, 1929 – March 5, 2011) was an American professional football halfback who played in the National Football League (NFL) with the San Francisco 49ers, Cleveland Browns, and Baltimore Colts. He played college football for the Stanford Indians and was selected by the 49ers in the 16th round of the 1951 NFL draft.

== Early life ==
Robert William White was born on May 25, 1929, in Los Angeles, California. He attended Herbert Hoover High School in Glendale, California.

== College career ==
White played junior college football at Glendale College in 1947. He transferred to Stanford University, where he was a three-year letterman for the Indians from 1948 to 1950. He graduated from Stanford with a bachelor's in history.

== Professional career ==
White was selected by the San Francisco 49ers in the 16th round, with the 184th overall pick, of the 1951 NFL draft. He signed with the team on June 17. He played in all 24 games, starting one, for the 49ers from 1951 to 1952, recording 32 carries for 66 yards and one touchdown, 15 receptions for 209 yards and two touchdowns, and one interception on defense for 11 yards. He missed the 1953 and 1954 seasons while serving as a first lieutenant in the United States Air Force during the Korean War. White re-signed with the 49ers for the 1955 season. He was released on September 15, 1955, before the start of the regular season.

White signed with the Cleveland Browns on October 2, 1955. He played in eight games (one start) for the Browns in 1955, returning 10 kicks for 258 yards and two punts for 28 yards before being waived.

White was claimed off waivers by the Baltimore Colts on November 23, 1955, after Don Shula was placed on season-ending injured reserve. White appeared in the remaining three games for Baltimore, returning four kicks for 142 yards.

== Personal life ==
White died on March 5, 2011, in Southlake, Texas.
