= Nick Feher =

American football player (1926–1992)

No. 37, 67
- Position: Guard

Personal information
- Born: July 13, 1926; Youngstown, Ohio, U.S.
- Died: December 28, 1992 (aged 66); Kingman, Arizona, U.S.
- Listed height: 6 ft 0 in (1.83 m)
- Listed weight: 224 lb (102 kg)

Career information
- High school: North (Youngstown)
- College: Georgia (1947–1950)
- NFL draft: 1951: 10th round, 112th overall pick

Career history
- San Francisco 49ers (1951–1954); Pittsburgh Steelers (1955)

Career NFL statistics
- Games played: 42
- Games started: 26
- Fumble recoveries: 2
- Stats at Pro Football Reference

Nicholas John Feher (July 23, 1926 – December 28, 1992) was an American professional football guard who played college football for Georgia (1947–1950) and professional football in the National Football League (NFL) for the San Francisco 49ers (1951–1954) and Pittsburgh Steelers (1955).

== Early life ==
Feher was born in 1926 in Youngstown, Ohio, and attended North High School. He initially enrolled at the University of Georgia in 1944, but he joined the Marines prior to the start of the football season. He was deployed overseas and fought at the Battle of Okinawa. After the war, he returned to school and played college football at the guard and tackle positions for the Georgia Bulldogs from 1947 to 1950. At Georgia, he won a reputation as "a fierce competitor who had no Bulldog superior as a downfield blocker."

== Professional football ==
He was drafted by the San Francisco 49ers in the 10th round (112th overall pick) of the 1951 NFL draft. He played for the 49ers from 1951 to 1954, appearing in 40 games, 23 of them as a starter. In September 1955, he was traded to the Pittsburgh Steelers as part of a three-team trade. He was waived by the Steelers in October 1955.

== Later life ==
Feher lived in Kingman, Arizona, in his retirement. He died there in 1992.
