= Bill Jessup =

American football player (1929–2015)

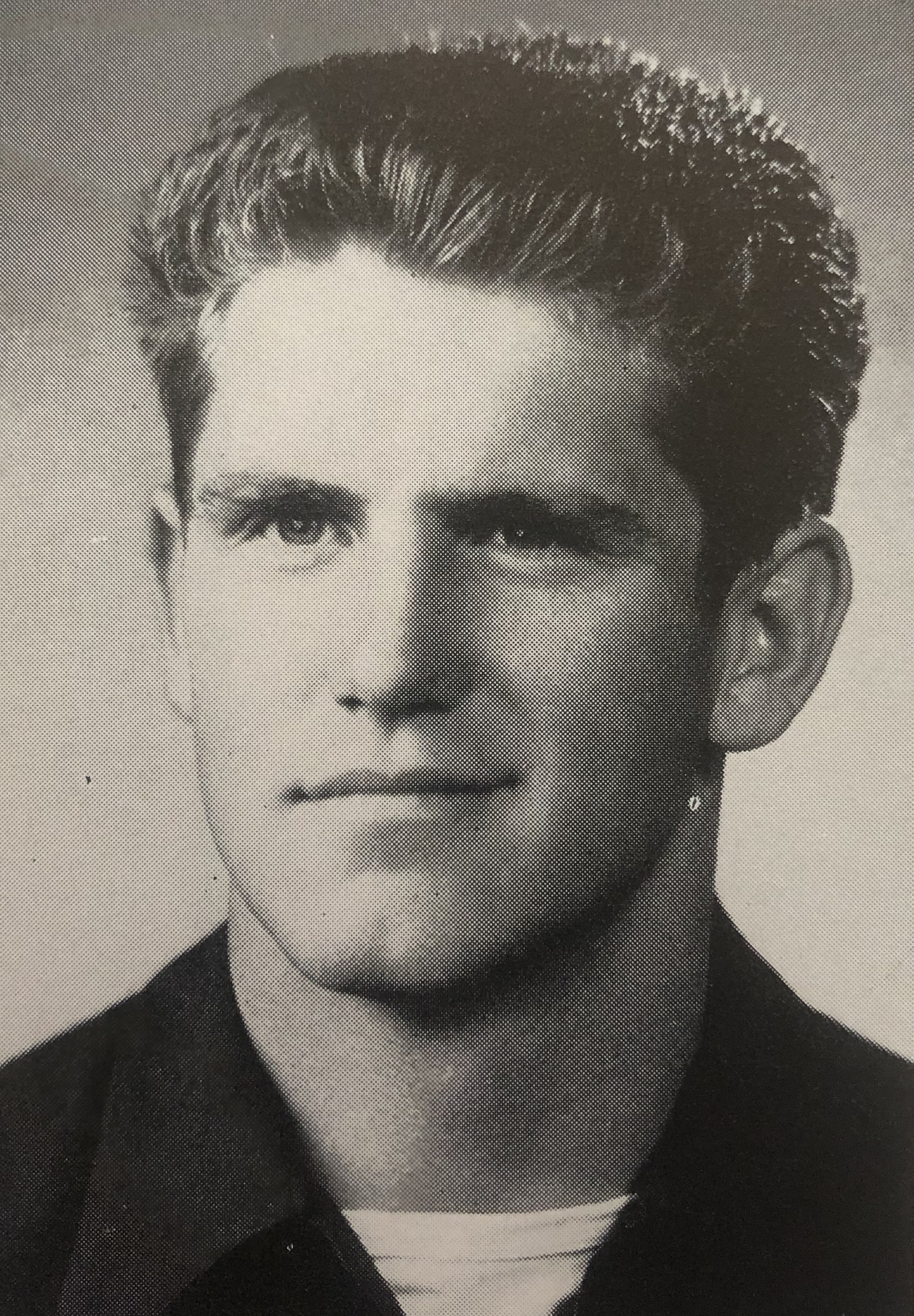
- Jessup at USC, c. 1949

No. 55, 85, 74, 81
- Positions: End, halfback

Personal information
- Born: March 17, 1929; Wray, Colorado, U.S.
- Died: January 3, 2015 (aged 85); Westminster, California, U.S.
- Listed height: 6 ft 1 in (1.85 m)
- Listed weight: 195 lb (88 kg)

Career information
- High school: Long Beach Polytechnic (Long Beach, California)
- College: USC
- NFL draft: 1951: 11th round, 126th overall pick

Career history
- San Francisco 49ers (1951–1952, 1954, 1956–1958); BC Lions (1959); Denver Broncos (1960)

Awards and highlights
- CFL Western All-Star (1959)

Career NFL/AFL statistics
- Receptions: 61
- Receiving yards: 994
- Touchdowns: 7
- Stats at Pro Football Reference

William Dean Jessup (March 17, 1929 – January 3, 2015) was an American professional football player who played wide receiver for seven seasons for the San Francisco 49ers and Denver Broncos. He also played one season, 1959, with the British Columbia Lions of the Canadian Football League (CFL), where he was selected as an All-Star at defensive back.
