= Ray Collins (American football) =

American gridiron football player (1927–1991)

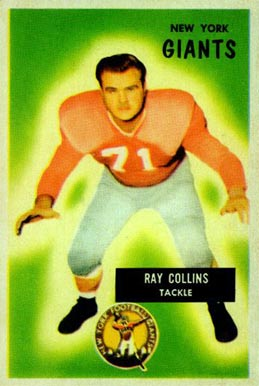
- Collins on a 1955 Bowman football card

No. 43, 72, 65, 71, 75
- Position: Defensive tackle

Personal information
- Born: 4 August 1927; Tomball, Texas, U.S.
- Died: 3 November 1991 (aged 64); Bexar County, Texas, U.S.
- Listed height: 5 ft 11 in (1.80 m)
- Listed weight: 238 lb (108 kg)

Career information
- High school: Fair Park (Shreveport, Louisiana)
- College: LSU
- NFL draft: 1950: 3rd round, 37th overall pick

Career history
- San Francisco 49ers (1950–1952); Saskatchewan Roughriders (1953); New York Giants (1954); Hamilton Tiger-Cats (1955); Dallas Texans (1960–1961)

Awards and highlights
- Pro Bowl (1951); Second-team All-SEC (1949)

Career NFL/AFL statistics
- Sacks: 6
- Fumble recoveries: 2
- Stats at Pro Football Reference

Alvin Raymond Collins (4 August 1927 – 3 November 1991) was an American professional football defensive tackle who played for the National Football League (NFL)'s San Francisco 49ers and New York Giants as well as in Canada for the Saskatchewan Roughriders in 1953 and the Hamilton Tiger-Cats in 1955 (winning All-Canadian honors), and finally for the American Football League (AFL)'s Dallas Texans. He played college football at Louisiana State University for the LSU Tigers football team.

== See also ==
- List of American Football League players
