= Al Carapella =

American gridiron football player (1927–2020)

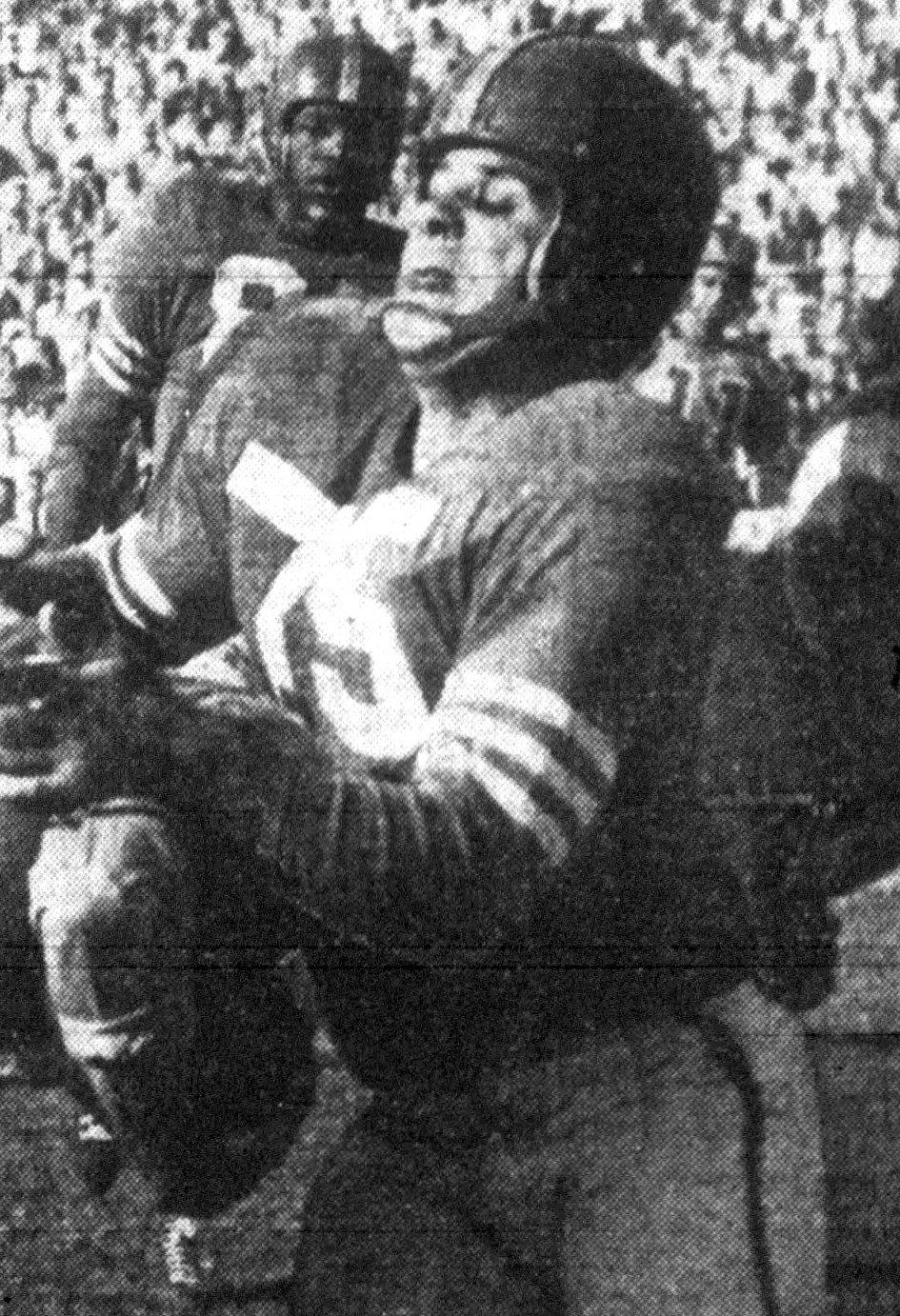
- Carapella in 1953

No. 45, 75, 62
- Positions: Defensive tackle, guard, linebacker

Personal information
- Born: April 26, 1927; Tuckahoe, New York, U.S.
- Died: October 17, 2020 (aged 93); Tuckahoe, New York, U.S.
- Listed height: 6 ft 0 in (1.83 m)
- Listed weight: 235 lb (107 kg)

Career information
- High school: Tuckahoe (Eastchester, New York)
- College: Miami
- NFL draft: 1951: 5th round, 54th overall pick

Career history
- San Francisco 49ers (1951–1955); Hamilton Tiger-Cats (1956)

Awards and highlights
- Pro Bowl (1954); First-team All-American (1950)

Career NFL statistics
- Interceptions: 3
- Fumble recoveries: 1
- Stats at Pro Football Reference

Alfred Richard Carapella (April 26, 1927 – October 17, 2020) was an American and Canadian football defensive tackle who played for the San Francisco 49ers and Hamilton Tiger-Cats.

== Early life and education ==
Carapella was born on April 26, 1927, in Tuckahoe, New York. During the Depression, Carapella lived with his three siblings in a cold water flat in Tuckahoe. While attending Tuckahoe High School, he lettered in football and baseball, excelling at both. Carapella was named to Westchester County's All-County football team in 1942, and he helped Tuckahoe High's baseball team win conference championships in 1943 and 1944.

After his junior year, Carapella had his older brother sign a waiver to allow him to try out for the New York Giants baseball club. After a tryout at the Polo Grounds, the Giants signed Carapella to a minor league contract. He was assigned to the Richmond Colts, then moved to the Erie Sailors. Because he signed a professional contract, Carapella was ineligible to compete in high school athletics during his senior year.

=== U.S. Army ===
Upon graduating from Tuckahoe High School in 1945, Carapella was drafted into the United States Army. Carapella was deployed to Germany, where he played football with the Berlin Bears, an interservice team composed of several college and NFL football players. Upon noticing that he could compete with players of that caliber, Carapella decided to pursue football when he was discharged from the Army. He asked his former high school coach to try to set up some workouts with college programs, and Carapella was invited to try out for the Miami and Kentucky. Carapella garnered scholarship offers from both schools, but his offer letter from Kentucky was addressed to his uncle by mistake, and he was unaware of the offer until after he had enrolled at Miami.

=== University of Miami ===
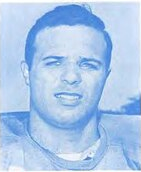
Carapella in 1950

During his first year at Miami, Carapella played on the freshman football team, playing offensive line and fullback. In his senior year, Carapella helped lead the undefeated Hurricanes to an Orange Bowl berth, where they were defeated by Clemson by a score of 15–14 after Miami surrendered a late safety.

Carapella died on October 17, 2020, in Tuckahoe, New York, at age 93.
