= Buck Shaw =

American football player and coach (1899–1977)

- Shaw in 1948

Biographical details
- Born: March 28, 1899; Mitchellville, Iowa, U.S.
- Died: March 19, 1977 (aged 77); Menlo Park, California, U.S.

Playing career
- 1918: Creighton
- 1919–1921: Notre Dame
- Positions: Tackle, placekicker

Coaching career (HC unless noted)
- 1924: NC State
- 1925–1928: Nevada
- 1929–1935: Santa Clara (line)
- 1936–1942: Santa Clara
- 1945: California
- 1946–1954: San Francisco 49ers
- 1956–1957: Air Force
- 1958–1960: Philadelphia Eagles

Head coaching record
- Overall: 72–49–12 (college); 90–55–5 (AAFC/NFL)
- Bowls: 2–0

Accomplishments and honors

Championships
- NFL Championship (1960)

Awards
- All-American Tackle all-time "Fighting Irish" football team (player); AP & UPI NFL Coach of the Year (1960); Iowa Sports Hall of Fame; San Francisco Bay Area Sports Hall of Fame; San Jose Sports Hall of Fame; Santa Clara University Hall of Fame
- College Football Hall of Fame; Inducted in 1972 (profile)

Lawrence Timothy "Buck" Shaw (March 28, 1899 – March 19, 1977) was an American football player and coach. He was the head coach for Santa Clara University, the University of California, Berkeley, the San Francisco 49ers, the United States Air Force Academy and the Philadelphia Eagles. He attended the University of Notre Dame, where he became a star player on Knute Rockne's first unbeaten team. He started his coaching career with one year as head coach at North Carolina State and four years as a line coach at Nevada in Reno.

At Santa Clara, he compiled an impressive .803 record; his first two teams posted consecutive Sugar Bowl wins over LSU. After war-time service, his only team at California went 4–5–1 in 1945. In 1946, Shaw became the San Francisco 49ers' first head coach in the old All-America Football Conference (AAFC) and continued through 1954; they entered the National Football League (NFL) in from 1950.

After two seasons as the first Air Force Academy varsity head coach (1956–1957), he returned to the NFL in 1958 with Philadelphia. In 1960, he led the team to an NFL Championship victory against Vince Lombardi, who said of Shaw, "That right there is a good man...an honest man." He stepped down after three seasons, following their win in the championship game over Vince Lombardi's Green Bay Packers; Shaw ended up being the only coach to have beaten Lombardi in a playoff game. Nicknamed "the Silver Fox", Shaw had a winning record in ten of his twelve seasons as a professional football coach while reaching the Championship Game in two different leagues and winning 62% of his games.

== Early life ==
Lawrence "Buck" Shaw was born in Mitchellville, Iowa, ten miles (16 km) east of Des Moines, to cattle ranchers Tim and Margaret Shaw. One of five children (brothers Bill, Jim, and John, and sister Mary), the family moved to Stuart when Shaw was ten, where high school football had been abolished because of a fatality. He played only four games as a prep after the sport was brought back in 1917, his senior year.

== College ==
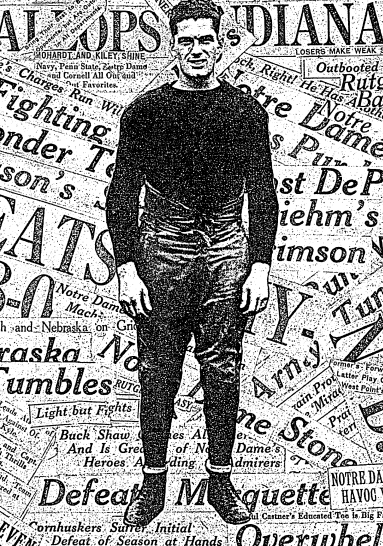
Shaw in 1921

Shaw enrolled at Creighton University in Omaha in the fall of 1918 and went out for football; he played one game before the rest of the schedule wiped out by the flu epidemic. He transferred to the University of Notre Dame in 1919. Shaw apparently loved track and field competition. In fact it was track, not football that attracted him to Notre Dame. He enrolled at South Bend and went out for the track team. However, Shaw fell into the hands of coach Knute Rockne and became one of the greatest tackles and placekickers in Notre Dame history.

At the 1921 NCAA Track and Field Championships, Shaw was 5th in the shot put, earning All-American honors representing the Notre Dame Fighting Irish track and field team.

Shaw was a starter for Rockne from 1919 to 1921, first at left tackle and then in 1920 and 1921 as right tackle opening holes for George Gipp. He finished his playing career being selected an All-American by Football World Magazine. Shaw also set a record by converting 38 of 39 extra points during his varsity career, a mark that stood until 1976, more than 50 years after he graduated. Shaw is a member of the all-time "Fighting Irish" football team.

== Coaching career ==
=== College ===
In the spring of Shaw's senior year at Notre Dame, Rockne came to Shaw with a couple of letters from schools seeking coaches, one from Auburn University in Alabama, and another from the University of Nevada in Reno.

Although he started his coaching career at North Carolina State in 1924, he apparently did not want to go further south to Auburn. He heard from a friend at Notre Dame who was from Nevada that American football was new out there; they'd been playing rugby before. In a 1970 interview, Shaw said, "It sounded like an interesting challenge, so I took the Nevada job as line coach."

Shaw was at Nevada for four years, then took a job with an oil firm and wanted to stay out of the coaching field, but was talked into becoming an assistant coach at Santa Clara University by his old teammate, Clipper Smith. He was line coach under Smith from 1929 to 1935; during the first season, the stock market crashed. "I had a heck of a time getting on my feet," explained Shaw, "Santa Clara could only afford to hire us on a seasonal basis in those years, and I was working for Standard Oil when I became head coach in 1936 after Clipper resigned to go to Villanova".

Shaw's first two Bronco teams (1936 and 1937) went a combined 18–1, including back-to-back wins in New Orleans over local favorite LSU in the Sugar Bowl in January 1937 and 1938. Possibly the first major coach to "phone-it-in" when because of an illness, he did not travel with the team but coached them to victory over the telephone. Santa Clara dropped football after the 1942 war-time season, and Shaw stayed on campus for two years to assist the Army's physical education program on campus.

Shaw, while waiting for the professional All-America Football Conference to get off the ground, managed to build up the University of California squad, defeating a Frankie Albert-led St. Mary's Pre-Flight team, 6–0. It was a losing season overall for the Bears, but they had a good bunch of players, Shaw and his staff remarked after the 1945 season.

=== San Francisco 49ers ===
Shaw was the San Francisco 49ers' first head coach, working with such pro luminaries as Frankie Albert, Y. A. Tittle and Hugh McElhenny. In 1944 and 1945, before World War II ended, the Morabito brothers, Victor and Tony, began organizing the San Francisco 49ers for entry into a new professional league, the All-America Football Conference (AAFC). Shaw and his assistant, Al Ruffo, were hired by the 49ers, but then were permitted to accept a one-year contract at California when the AAFC league kickoff was delayed until 1946.

In 1946, Shaw took over the 49ers, and with the left-handed Frankie Albert leading and directing the attack, the team placed second to the Cleveland Browns four times (1946–1949) in the Western Division of the AAFC. In 1950, the 49ers along with the Browns and the Baltimore Colts merged with the rival NFL.

While the Browns quickly emerged as one of the NFL's best teams and the first Colts franchise folded after one season as the league's worst, the 49ers were a solidly upper-mid-level team during their first years in the league. A rough 3–9 record in 1950 was followed with records of 7–4–1 in 1951, 7–5 in 1952, and 9–3 in 1953. As coach Shaw entered the 1954 campaign, his 9th season with the club, expectations of team owner Tony Morabito for a conference championship were acute.

Unfortunately for Shaw and the 49ers, their 1954 draft was an extremely poor one, with 1st round quarterback Bernie Faloney opting to play in Canada and only 9th round guard Ted Connolly providing a significant addition to the roster. After a fast start, with four wins and a tie, star halfback Hugh McElhenny was lost for the year with a separated shoulder in a game against the Bears. McElhenny had been having a sensational season, racking up 515 yards with an 8.0 average during the opening five games. Without him, the gold-diggers went into an immediate tailspin, dropping four of their next five games en route to a 7–4–1 third-place finish in the NFL's Western Conference.

Despite a record of 71–39–4 over his nine years as head coach of the 49ers, Buck Shaw was fired on December 13, 1954. Shaw offered friendly words to his successor, ex-St. Mary's star Norman "Red" Strader: "I wish him the best of luck — and luck is what you need in this game."

=== Falcons and Eagles ===
After his termination in San Francisco, Shaw returned to the college ranks, becoming the second varsity head football coach at Air Force Academy. As the field commander at Air Force, Shaw guided the Falcons to a 6–2–1 mark in 1956 and a 3–6–1 record in 1957.

In 1958, Shaw took over a last-place Philadelphia Eagles team and started a rebuild of his own. He immediately dealt Buck Lansford, Jimmy Harris, and a first-round draft choice to the Los Angeles Rams for 32-year-old, nine-year veteran quarterback Norm Van Brocklin. The move proved inspired.

Shaw and Van Brocklin led the Eagles to the NFL championship in 1960 with a 17–13 victory at Franklin Field over Vince Lombardi's Green Bay Packers, the only time the Lombardi-era Packers lost a postseason game. The contest ended on a game-saving tackle of Green Bay's Jim Taylor inside then ten-yard line. It was made by center/linebacker "sixty-minute-man" Chuck Bednarik, who because of early season injuries at linebacker revived, at Shaw's request, the long-discarded concept of two-way football.

After winning the 1960 championship, the 61-year-old Coach Shaw retired, saying "I wanted to get out while I was ahead." In the quiet Green Bay dressing room, losing coach Lombardi expressed well wishes, stating, "Seeing he's going to retire, that's a nice note for him to go out on." Shaw was the oldest head coach to win an NFL championship for over 39 years, until Dick Vermeil's victory with the St. Louis Rams in Super Bowl XXXIV in early 2000.

== Later life and legacy ==
After retiring from coaching, Shaw returned to California to work for a paper products company, and spent the later years of his life in Menlo Park. He and his wife had two married daughters who also lived in California.

In 1962, led by Sal Sanfilippo (SCU '30, J.D. SCU '32), former players, friends, and fans of Shaw banded together to form the Bronco Bench Foundation to raise money for and build a football stadium on the Santa Clara University campus in his honor. On September 22, 1962, the first football game, a contest between Santa Clara and UC Davis, was played in Buck Shaw Stadium.

Shaw died of cancer on March 19, 1977, aged 77, at Stanford University's Branch Convalescent Hospital.

== Head coaching record ==
=== College ===
Year	Team	Overall	Conference	Standing	Bowl/playoffs	AP^{#}
NC State Wolfpack (Southern Conference) (1924)
1924	NC State	2–6–2	1–4–1	18th		
NC State:		2–6–2	1–4–1			
Nevada Wolf Pack (Far Western Conference) (1925–1928)
1925	Nevada	4–3–1	3–1	2nd		
1926	Nevada	4–4	3–1	2nd		
1927	Nevada	2–6–1	1–3	5th		
1928	Nevada	0–7–1	0–4–1	6th		
Nevada:		10–20–3	7–9–1			
Santa Clara Broncos (Independent) (1936–1942)
1936	Santa Clara	8–1			W Sugar	6
1937	Santa Clara	9–0			W Sugar	9
1938	Santa Clara	6–2				
1939	Santa Clara	5–1–3				14
1940	Santa Clara	6–1–1				11
1941	Santa Clara	6–3				
1942	Santa Clara	7–2				15
Santa Clara:		47–10–4				
California Golden Bears (Pacific Coast Conference) (1945)
1945	California	4–5–1	2–4–1	6th		
California:		4–5–1	2–4–1			
Air Force Falcons (Independent) (1956–1957)
1956	Air Force	6–2–1				
1957	Air Force	3–6–1				
Air Force:		9–8–2				
Total:		72–49–12				
^{#}Rankings from final AP Poll.

=== Professional (AAFC/NFL) ===
Team	Year	Regular season					Postseason			
Team	Year	Won	Lost	Ties	Win %	Finish	Won	Lost	Win %	Result
SF	1946	9	5	0	.643	2nd in Western	-	-	-	
SF	1947	8	4	2	.667	2nd in Western	-	-	-	
SF	1948	12	2	0	.857	2nd in Western	-	-	-	
SF	1949	9	3	0	.750	2nd in AAFC	1	1	.500	Lost to Cleveland Browns in AAFC Championship Game
SF	1950	3	9	0	.250	T-5th in National	-	-	-	
SF	1951	7	4	1	.636	T-2nd in National	-	-	-	
SF	1952	7	5	0	.583	3rd in National	-	-	-	
SF	1953	9	3	0	.750	2nd in Western	-	-	-	
SF	1954	7	4	1	.636	3rd in Western	-	-	-	
SF 49ers AAFC-NFL Total		71	39	5	.621		1	1	.500	
PHI	1958	2	9	1	.182	5th in NFL Eastern	-	-	-	
PHI	1959	7	5	0	.583	2nd in NFL Eastern	-	-	-	
PHI	1960	10	2	0	.833	1st in NFL Eastern	1	0	1.000	Beat Green Bay Packers in NFL Championship Game
PHI NFL Total		19	16	1	.543		1	0	1.000	
Professional Total		90	55	5	.621		2	1	.666	
Source: Pro-Football-Reference.com
