= Rex Berry =

American football player (1924–2005)

- Berry in 1955

No. 83, 23
- Positions: Defensive back, halfback

Personal information
- Born: September 9, 1924; Moab, Utah, U.S.
- Died: July 1, 2005 (aged 80); Provo, Utah, U.S.
- Listed height: 5 ft 11 in (1.80 m)
- Listed weight: 190 lb (86 kg)

Career information
- High school: Carbon (Price)
- College: BYU (1948–1950)
- NFL draft: 1951: 14th round, 162nd overall pick

Career history
- San Francisco 49ers (1951–1956)

Career NFL statistics
- Interceptions: 22
- Fumble recoveries: 8
- Total touchdowns: 3
- Stats at Pro Football Reference

Charles Rex Berry (September 9, 1924 – July 1, 2004) was a professional American football cornerback in the National Football League (NFL). He played six seasons for the San Francisco 49ers (1951–1956).

Berry was a star athlete at Carbon High School (called the Carbon Comet) in Price, Utah in multiple sports and played on several American Legion baseball teams. At BYU he was on both the football and baseball teams. He combined on a 2-0 shutout of Smithfield with Eldon Rachele in state baseball play. He led Helper to the 1940 American Legion state baseball title.

Berry was a member of the Church of Jesus Christ of Latter-day Saints and served in several positions in the Church, including as a bishop and a member of a high council.
