= Jim Monachino =

American football player (1929–2021)

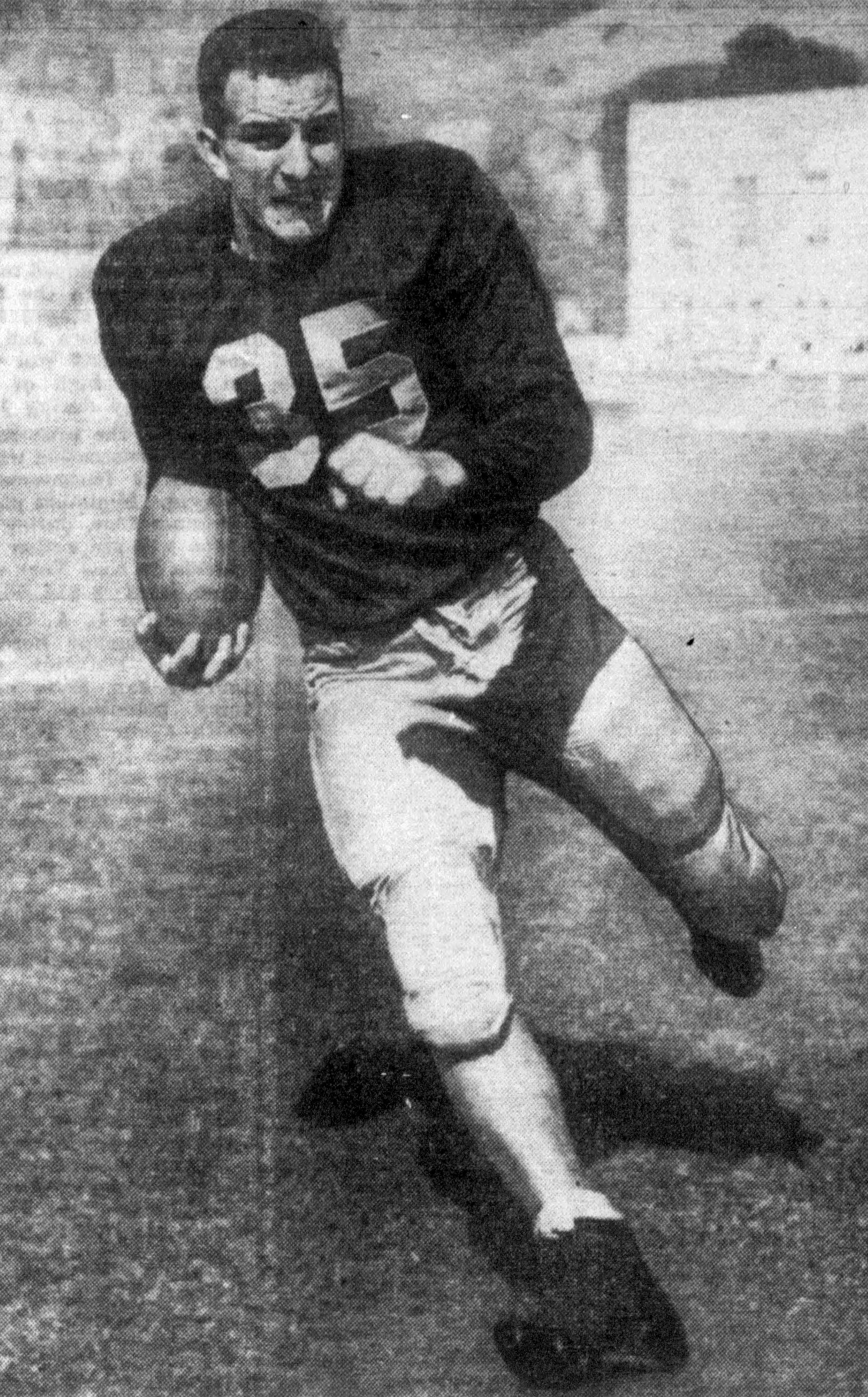
- Monachino, circa 1949

No. 99, 49
- Positions: Halfback, fullback, defensive back

Personal information
- Born: July 9, 1929; Cleveland, Ohio, U.S.
- Died: April 28, 2021 (aged 91); West Des Moines, Iowa, U.S.
- Listed height: 5 ft 10 in (1.78 m)
- Listed weight: 187 lb (85 kg)

Career information
- High school: Redondo Union (Redondo Beach, California)
- College: California
- NFL draft: 1951: 12th round, 137th overall pick

Career history
- San Francisco 49ers (1951, 1953); Washington Redskins (1955)

Awards and highlights
- First-team All-PCC (1950)

Career NFL statistics
- Rushing yards: 291
- Rushing average: 4.1
- Receptions: 11
- Receiving yards: 89
- Total touchdowns: 4
- Stats at Pro Football Reference

James Monachino (July 9, 1929 – April 28, 2021) was an American professional football halfback in the National Football League (NFL) for the San Francisco 49ers and Washington Redskins. He played college football at the University of California, Berkeley and was drafted in the twelfth round of the 1951 NFL draft.
