= Tony Morabito =

American sports executive (1910–1957)

- Morabito, circa 1956
- Born: January 12, 1910; San Francisco, California, U.S.
- Died: October 27, 1957 (aged 47); San Francisco, California, U.S.
- Education: Santa Clara University
- Occupation: Businessman
- Known for: Founder of the San Francisco 49ers
- Term: 1946–1957
- Successor: Josephine Morabito
- Board member of: San Francisco 49ers

Anthony James Morabito (January 12, 1910 – October 27, 1957) was the founder of the San Francisco 49ers of the National Football League (NFL).

== Biography ==
=== Establishment of 49ers ===
Following his graduation from the University of Santa Clara he had a moderately successful lumber hauling business in San Francisco, California during the late 1930s and early 1940s. During this time, he realized that air travel would make coast-to-coast NFL rivalries feasible. In 1944, after several years of his expansion applications being rejected by the NFL, Morabito led a visit to the NFL in Chicago. His meeting was presided over by Elmer Layden, the NFL commissioner and one of the legendary Four Horsemen of Notre Dame. Layden was dismissive of Morabito's requests.

Following that meeting, Morabito and his partners walked across the street to see Arch Ward, the sports editor of the Chicago Tribune who was trying to organize a rival league, the All-America Football Conference (AAFC). On June 6, 1944, the first meeting of the AAFC was held in St. Louis. Morabito agreed to form a franchise in San Francisco, with the AAFC set to start play after the end of the war.

Tony, his brother Victor P. Morabito, and his partners in the Lumber Terminals of San Francisco, Allen E. Sorrell and Ernest J. Turre, became the founding owners of the soon to be San Francisco 49ers. Al Ruffo did the legal work while serving as the assistant coach to head coach Lawrence T. "Buck" Shaw. The university of Santa Clara's famous "Silver Fox", Shaw was paid the then fabulous sum of $25,000.

The 49ers played their first game on August 24, 1946, a 17–7 exhibition win over the Los Angeles Dons at Balboa Park in San Diego. The 49ers first home game was played at Kezar Stadium on September 1, 1946, a 34–14 exhibition win over the Chicago Rockets in front of 45,000 .

Morabito was seen as controversial by some, but throughout his tenure, the players supported him.

=== Death ===
On October 27, 1957, Tony Morabito died of a heart attack while watching the 49ers play the Chicago Bears at Kezar Stadium. Having suffered a coronary occlusion in 1952, Morabito had been living on "borrowed time". Doctors, citing the dangerous, high emotional factors of football, urged him to get out of football. The 49ers were losing 17–7 when a note reading "Tony's gone" was passed to the coach. They stormed back for a 21–17 upset victory.

After Morabito died, majority control of the club passed on to his widow Josephine and his brother Victor. Most of the remaining partners from the lumber business had sold their interest after the 1946 season. Following Victor's death in 1964, Tony's and Victor's widows, Josephine and Jane, retained control of the 49ers until 1977, when a new team owner, Edward J. DeBartolo, Jr. of Youngstown, Ohio, took over. Josephine Morabito, known as Josephine Morabito-Fox after 1975, was one of the first women ever to hold a majority ownership in a professional sports team.
