= 1946 San Francisco 49ers season =

American football team season

- Owner: Tony Morabito
- General manager: John Blackinger
- Head coach: Buck Shaw
- Home stadium: Kezar Stadium

Results
- Record: 9–5
- Division place: 2nd AAFC West
- Playoffs: Did not qualify

The 1946 San Francisco 49ers season was the inaugural season of the San Francisco 49ers and the first season of the All-America Football Conference. Led by head coach Buck Shaw, the team compiled a 9–5 record and finished second in the AAFC West Division. The 49ers also had the second best scoring offense (307 points scored) in the AAFC.

The team's statistical leaders included quarterback Frankie Albert with 1,404 passing yards, fullback Norm Standlee with 651 rushing yards, and end Alyn Beals with 586 receiving yards and 61 points scored.

== Personnel ==
=== Staff ===
1946 San Francisco 49ers staff
Front office: Principal Owner – Tony Morabito; General Manager – John Blackinger; Head coaches: Head coach – Buck Shaw; Offensive coaches: Lines – Albert J. Ruffo	Defensive coaches: Ends – Jim Lawson

== Roster ==
1946 San Francisco 49ers final roster
Quarterbacks: 63 Frankie Albert P; 62 Jesse Freitas S; 64 Parker Hall S; Ends/Receivers: 57 Ed Balatti; 53 Alyn Beals; 56 Bill Fisk; 55 Hank Norberg; 58 Nick Susoeff; 51 Bob Titchenal	Linemen/Linebackers: 33 Bruno Banducci G/DG; 42 Bob Bryant T/DT; 22 Gerry Conlee C/LB; 21 Dutch Elston LB/C; 34 Eddie Forrest LB/G; 32 Garland Gregory G/DG; 47 Visco Grgich T/DT; 46 John Kuzman T/DT; 45 John Mellus T/DT; 37 Charlie Pavlich G/DG; 23 Bill Remington C/LB; 35 Rupe Thornton G/MG; 41 John Woudenberg T/DT	Backs: 83 Ken Casanega S/RB; 93 Don Durdan CB/RB; 81 Len Eshmont RB/CB; 82 Pete Franceschi RB/CB; 73 Ned Mathews S/FB; 94 Earle Parsons RB/CB; 72 Norm Standlee FB/LB; 91 Johnny Strzykalski RB/CB; 82 Joe Vetrano CB/RB/K; rookies in italics

== Preseason ==
Week	Date	Opponent	Result	Record	Venue	Sources
1	August 24	vs. Los Angeles Dons	W 17–7	1–0	Balboa Stadium	
2	September 1	vs. Chicago Rockets	W 34–14	2–0	Kezar Stadium	

== Regular season ==
=== Schedule ===
Week	Date	Opponent	Result	Record	Venue	Sources
1	September 8	New York Yankees	**L** 7–21	0–1	Kezar Stadium	
2	September 15	Miami Seahawks	**W** 21–14	1–1	Kezar Stadium	
3	September 22	Brooklyn Dodgers	**W** 32–13	2–1	Kezar Stadium	
4	September 29	at **Chicago Rockets**	**L** 7–24	2–2	Soldier Field	
5	October 8	at Miami Seahawks	**W** 34–7	3–2	Burdine Stadium	
6	October 12	at **Los Angeles Dons**	**W** 23–14	4–2	Los Angeles Memorial Coliseum	
7	October 19	at Buffalo Bisons	**L** 14–17	4–3	Civic Stadium	
8	October 27	at **Cleveland Browns**	**W** 34–20	5–3	Cleveland Municipal Stadium	
9	November 2	Buffalo Bisons	**W** 27–14	6–3	Kezar Stadium	
10	November 10	**Cleveland Browns**	**L** 7–14	6–4	Kezar Stadium	
11	November 17	at New York Yankees	**L** 9–10	6–5	Yankee Stadium	
12	November 24	at Brooklyn Dodgers	**W** 30–14	7–5	Ebbets Field	
13	November 30	**Chicago Rockets**	**W** 14–0	8–5	Kezar Stadium	
14	December 8	**Los Angeles Dons**	**W** 48–7	9–5	Kezar Stadium	
15	Bye					
Note: Intra-division opponents are in **bold** text.

=== Game summaries ===
All game reports use the Pro Football Researchers' gamebook archive as a source.

==== Week 1: vs. New York Yankees ====
Week 1: New York Yankees at San Francisco 49ers – Game summary

Quarter	1	2	3	4	Total
**Yankees**	0	7	7	7	**21**
49ers	7	0	0	0	**7**

at Kezar Stadium, San Francisco, California

- Date: September 8, 1946
- Game attendance: 35,000
- Boxscore

Game information

**First quarter**

- SF – Len Eshmont 40-yard pass from Frankie Albert (Joe Vetrano kick). 49ers 7–0.

**Second quarter**

- NY – Lowell Wagner 40-yard blocked punt return (Harvey Johnson kick). Tied 7–7.

**Third quarter**

- NY – Ace Parker 7-yard rush (Harvey Johnson kick). Yankees 14–7.

**Fourth quarter**

- NY – Dewey Proctor 3-yard rush (Harvey Johnson kick). Yankees 21–7.

**Top passers**

- NY – Spec Sanders – 5/13, 35 yards, INT
- SF – Frankie Albert – 7/11, 96 yards

**Top rushers**

- NY – Spec Sanders – 11 rushes, 46 yards
- SF – Len Eshmont – 9 rushes, 24 yards

**Top receivers**

- NY – Harry Burris – 2 receptions, 91 yards
- SF – Len Eshmont – 3 receptions, 91 yards, TD

==== Week 2: vs. Miami Seahawks ====
Week 2: Miami Seahawks at San Francisco 49ers – Game summary

Quarter	1	2	3	4	Total
Seahawks	7	0	0	7	**14**
**49ers**	7	7	7	0	**21**

at Kezar Stadium, San Francisco, California

- Date: September 15, 1946
- Game attendance: 25,000
- Boxscore

Game information

**First quarter**

- SF – Dick Renfro ?-yard rush (Joe Vetrano kick). 49ers 7–0.
- MIA – Lamar Davis 22-yard pass from Marion Pugh (Dick Erdlitz kick). Tied 7–7.

**Second quarter**

- SF – Dick Renfro 5-yard rush (Joe Vetrano kick). 49ers 14–7.

**Third quarter**

- SF – Dick Renfro 3-yard rush (Joe Vetrano kick). 49ers 21–7.

**Fourth quarter**

- MIA – Prince Scott 30-yard pass from Cotton Price (Dick Erdlitz kick). 49ers 21–14.

**Top passers**

- MIA – Cotton Price – 5/8, 94 yards, TD
- SF – Jesse Freitas – 7/11, 75 yards, INT

**Top rushers**

- MIA – Spec Sanders – rushes, 46 yards
- SF – Dick Renfro – 10 rushes, 67 yards, 3 TD

**Top receivers**

- MIA – Harry Burris – 3 receptions, 46 yards, TD
- SF – Alyn Beals – 3 receptions, 32 yards

==== Week 3: vs. Brooklyn Dodgers ====
Week 3: Brooklyn Dodgers at San Francisco 49ers – Game summary

Quarter	1	2	3	4	Total
Dodgers	7	0	0	6	**13**
**49ers**	7	12	13	0	**32**

at Kezar Stadium, San Francisco, California

- Date: September 22, 1946
- Game attendance: 35,000
- Boxscore

Game information

**First quarter**

- BRO – Mickey Colmer 27-yard pass from Lew Mayne (Jim McCarthy kick). Dodgers 7–0.
- SF – Len Eshmont 5-yard rush (John Mellus kick). Tied 7–7.

**Second quarter**

- SF – Len Eshmont 35-yard pass from Frankie Albert. 49ers 13–7.
- SF – Alyn Beals 43-yard pass from Frankie Albert. 49ers 19–7.

**Third quarter**

- SF – Bob Titchenal 42-yard pass from Len Eshmont. 49ers 25–7.
- SF – Frankie Albert 10-yard rush (Joe Vetrano kick). 49ers 32–7.

**Fourth quarter**

- BRO – Neal Adams 7-yard pass from Glenn Dobbs. 49ers 32–13.

**Top passers**

- BRO – Glenn Dobbs – 23/40, 198 yards, TD
- SF – Frankie Albert – 7/10, 145 yards, 2 TD, INT

**Top rushers**

- BRO – Lew Mayne – 4 rushes, 21 yards
- SF – Len Eshmont – 7 rushes, 47 yards, TD

**Top receivers**

- BRO – Cal Purdin – 6 receptions, 58 yards
- SF – Alyn Beals – 2 receptions, 68 yards, TD

==== Week 4: at Chicago Rockets ====
Week 4: San Francisco 49ers at Chicago Rockets – Game summary

Quarter	1	2	3	4	Total
49ers	0	0	0	7	**7**
**Rockets**	0	3	14	7	**24**

at Soldier Field, Chicago, Illinois

- Date: September 29, 1946
- Game attendance: 36,875
- Boxscore

Game information
**Second quarter**
- CHR – Steve Nemeth 20-yard field goal. Rockets 3–0.

**Third quarter**

- CHR – Elroy Hirsch 8-yard pass from Bob Hoernschemeyer (Steve Nemeth kick). Rockets 10–0.
- CHR – Bill Kellagher 3-yard rush (Steve Nemeth kick). Rockets 17–0.

**Fourth quarter**

- SF – Len Eshmont 2-yard rush (Joe Vetrano kick). Rockets 17–7.
- CHR – Ralph Heywood 15-yard pass from Bob Hoernschemeyer (Steve Nemeth kick). Rockets 24–7.

==== Week 5: at Miami Seahawks ====
Week 5: San Francisco 49ers at Miami Seahawks – Game summary

Quarter	1	2	3	4	Total
**49ers**	7	7	7	13	**34**
Seahawks	0	0	0	7	**7**

at Orange Bowl, Miami, Florida

- Date: October 8, 1946
- Game attendance: 7,621
- Boxscore

Game information
**First quarter**
- SF – Len Eshmont 2-yard rush (Joe Vetrano kick). 49ers 7–0.

**Second quarter**

- SF – Alyn Beals 12-yard pass from Jesse Freitas (Joe Vetrano kick). 49ers 14–0.

**Third quarter**

- SF – Earle Parsons 24-yard rush (Joe Vetrano kick). 49ers 21–0.

**Fourth quarter**

- MIA – Prince Scott 4-yard pass from Jimmy Tarrant (Dick Erdlitz kick). 49ers 21–7.
- SF – Pete Franceschi 8-yard rush. 49ers 27–7.
- SF – John Kuzman 72-yard fumble return (Joe Vetrano kick). 49ers 34–7.

==== Week 6: at Los Angeles Dons ====
Week 6: San Francisco 49ers at Los Angeles Dons – Game summary

Quarter	1	2	3	4	Total
**49ers**	10	7	0	6	**23**
Dons	0	7	7	0	**14**

at Los Angeles Memorial Coliseum, Los Angeles, California

- Date: October 12, 1946
- Game attendance: 12,500
- Boxscore

Game information
**First quarter**
- SF – Joe Vetrano 26-yard field goal. 49ers 3–0.
- SF – Alyn Beals 5-yard pass from Frankie Albert (Joe Vetrano kick). 49ers 10–0.

**Second quarter**

- LA – Andy Marefos 1-yard rush (Joe Aguirre kick). 49ers 10–7.

**Third quarter**

- SF – Frankie Albert 5-yard rush (Joe Vetrano kick). 49ers 17–7.
- LA – Bob Nowaskey 35-yard interception return (Joe Aguirre kick). 49ers 17–14.

**Fourth quarter**

- SF – Earle Parsons 66-yard rush. 49ers 23–14.

==== Week 7: at Buffalo Bisons ====
Week 7: San Francisco 49ers at Buffalo Bisons – Game summary

Quarter	1	2	3	4	Total
49ers	0	14	0	0	**14**
**Bisons**	3	7	0	7	**17**

at Civic Stadium, Buffalo, New York

- Date: October 19, 1946
- Game attendance: 6,101
- Boxscore

Game information
**First quarter**

**Second quarter** **Third quarter** **Fourth quarter**

==== Week 8: at Cleveland Browns ====
Week 8: San Francisco 49ers at Cleveland Browns – Game summary

Quarter	1	2	3	4	Total
**49ers**	3	17	7	7	**34**
Browns	0	6	0	14	**20**

at Cleveland Municipal Stadium, Cleveland, Ohio

- Date: October 27, 1946
- Game attendance: 70,365
- Boxscore

Game information
**First quarter**

**Second quarter** **Third quarter** **Fourth quarter**

== Standings ==
AAFC Western Division
	W	L	T	PCT	DIV	PF	PA	STK
Cleveland Browns	12	2	0	.857	4–2	423	137	W5
San Francisco 49ers	9	5	0	.643	4–2	307	189	W3
Los Angeles Dons	7	5	2	.583	2–3–1	305	290	T1
Chicago Rockets	5	6	3	.455	1–4–1	263	315	T1

Note: Tie games were not officially counted in the standings.
