= 1946 Miami Seahawks season =

American football team season

- Head coach: Jack Meagher
- Home stadium: Burdine Stadium

Results
- Record: 3–11
- Division place: 4th AAFC Eastern
- Playoffs: Did not qualify

Program for the Seahawks' week 9 game against the New York Yankees.

The 1946 Miami Seahawks season was the inaugural season for the Miami Seahawks who played in the All-America Football Conference one season from 1946–1947. The teams head coach, Jack Meagher led the team to a 3–11 regular season finish, fourth out of the four teams in the Eastern Division and missing the playoffs.

The team's record holders include Marion Pugh with 608 passing yards, Jimmy Nelson with 163 rushing yards, Lamar Davis with 275 receiving yards, and Dick Erdlitz with 34 points scored (22 extra points, two field goals, and one touchdown).

Rookie guard Buddy Jungmichel was selected by both the United Press and the AAFC as a second-team guard on the 1946 All-AAFC football team.

== Regular season ==
=== Schedule ===
Game	Date	Opponent	Result	Record	Venue	Attendance	Recap	Sources
1	September 6	at Cleveland Browns	**L** 0–44	0–1	Cleveland Stadium		Recap	
2	September 15	at San Francisco 49ers	**L** 14–21	0–2	Kezar Stadium		Recap	
3	September 20	at Los Angeles Dons	**L** 14–30	0–3	L.A. Memorial Coliseum		Recap	
4	October 8	San Francisco 49ers	**L** 7–34	0–4	Miami Orange Bowl		Recap	
5	October 11	at **Buffalo Bisons**	**W** 17–14	1–4	Civic Stadium		Recap	
6	October 18	at Chicago Rockets	**L** 7–28	1–5	Soldier Field		Recap	
7	October 25	at **Brooklyn Dodgers**	**L** 7–30	1–6	Ebbets Field		Recap	
8	November 3	at **New York Yankees**	**L** 21–24	1–7	Yankee Stadium		Recap	
9	November 11	Chicago Rockets	**L** 7–20	1–8	Miami Orange Bowl		Recap	
10	November 18	**Buffalo Bisons**	**W** 21–14	2–8	Miami Orange Bowl		Recap	
11	November 25	Los Angeles Dons	**L** 21–34	2–9	Miami Orange Bowl		Recap	
12	December 3	Cleveland Browns	**L** 0–34	2–10	Miami Orange Bowl		Recap	
13	December 9	**New York Yankees**	**L** 0–31	2–11	Miami Orange Bowl		Recap	
14	December 13	**Brooklyn Dodgers**	**W** 31–20	3–11	Miami Orange Bowl		Recap	
Note: Intra-division opponents are in **bold** text.

== Standings ==
AAFC Eastern Division
	W	L	T	PCT	DIV	PF	PA	STK
New York Yankees	10	3	1	.769	6–0	270	192	W2
Buffalo Bisons	3	10	1	.231	1–5	249	370	L3
Brooklyn Dodgers	3	10	1	.231	2–4	226	339	L6
Miami Seahawks	3	11	0	.214	3–3	167	378	W1

Note: Tie games were not officially counted in the standings.

== Roster ==
Players shown in bold started at least one game at the position listed as confirmed by contemporary game coverage.

1946 Miami Seahawks final roster
**Quarterbacks**: QB **Marion Pugh**; QB **Cotton Price**; QB **Jimmy Tarrant**; Ken Holley; **Fullbacks**: FB **Don Reece**; FB/LHB **Dub Jones**; FB **Pres Johnston**; FB **Jim Reynolds**; FB **Terry Fox**; FB **Frank Trigilio**; FB/RHB **Harry Hopp**; **Halfbacks**: LHB/RHB **Jimmy Nelson**; RHB **Dick Erdlitz**; LHB/RHB **Monk Gafford**; LHB **Kay Eakin**; RHB/FB **Bob Paffrath**; LHB **Stan Kozlowski**; LHB **Cal Purdin**; Bill Daley; Fred Gloden; Walt McDonald; Fondren Mitchell; Stan Stasica; Johnny Vardian	**Ends**: LE **Hub Ulrich**; RE **Lamar Blount**; RE **Prince Scott**; LE/QB/LHB **Lamar Davis**; LE/RE **Dick Horne**; LE **Terry Fox**; Hamp Pool; **Tackles**: LT/RT **Mitchell Olenski**; RT/LT/LE **Gene Ellenson**; RT/LT **George Hekkers**; RT/LG **Bill Davis**; Paul Berezney; Frank Hrabetin; **Guards**: LG/RG **Chuck Taylor**; RG/LG **Buddy Jungmichel**; LG **Jim Sivell**; Ed Bell; Joe Krivonak; George Zorich; **Centers**: C **Ken Whitlow**; C **Daryl Cato**; C **Al Wukits**; John Tavener; Tex Williams
