= 1947 Baltimore Colts season =

American football team season

1947 Baltimore Colts (1947–1950) season
- Head coach: Cecil Isbell
- Home stadium: Memorial Stadium

Results
- Record: 2–11–1
- Division place: 4th AAFC
- Playoffs: Did not qualify

Program for the Colts' fourth game of their inaugural season in Baltimore against the New York Yankees.

The 1947 Baltimore Colts season was the second season of the franchise in the All-America Football Conference (AAFC) and their first as the original Baltimore Colts. In this 1947 Colts debut, the team finished last in their division, winning only two games.

The team's statistical leaders included Bud Schwenk with 2,236 passing yards, Bus Mertes with 321 rushing yards, and Billy Hillenbrand with 702 receiving yards and 10 touchdowns scored.

Although the All-America Football Conference was an integrated league from its inception, the 1947 Baltimore Colts did not have a single black player on their roster.

== History ==
=== Background ===
The All-America Football Conference (AAFC) was first organized in 1944 with a series of secret meetings of frustrated potential-franchise owners locked out of membership in the National Football League (NFL). From the outset eyes were laid upon Baltimore, the seventh biggest city in America, as a prospective home for a viable AAFC franchise — with former heavyweight boxing champion Gene Tunney attending organizational meetings as a prospective franchise owner.

Tunney was drafted into the military, however, and plans for a Baltimore franchise were shelved. A team was instead awarded to Miami, Florida — the Miami Seahawks.

When the AAFC began playing games in 1946, the Seahawks were sent on the road for seven of their first eight contests. Poor scheduling led to poor performance, a 1–7 start, and fans stayed away in droves, with just 49,151 fans coming through the turnstiles in 1946. The Miami franchise relocated for economic reasons at the end of its only season in Miami.

Although the All-America Football Conference was an integrated league from its inception, the 1947 Baltimore Colts did not have a single black player on their roster.

== Season schedule ==
Week	Date	Opponent	Result	Record	Venue	Attendance	Game recap	Source
1	September 7	**Brooklyn Dodgers**	**W** 16–7	1–0	Municipal Stadium	27,418	Recap	
2	September 14	at San Francisco 49ers	**L** 7–14	1–1	Kezar Stadium	25,787	Recap	
3	September 21	at Cleveland Browns	**L** 0–28	1–2	Cleveland Municipal Stadium	44,257	Recap	
4	September 28	**New York Yankees**	**L** 7–21	1–3	Municipal Stadium	51,583	Recap	
5	October 5	San Francisco 49ers	**T** 28–28	1–3–1	Municipal Stadium	29,556	Recap	
6	October 12	at **Buffalo Bills**	**L** 15–20	1–4–1	Civic Stadium	27,345	Recap	
7	October 19	Los Angeles Dons	**L** 10–38	1–5–1	Municipal Stadium	36,852	Recap	
8	October 26	at Los Angeles Dons	**L** 0–56	1–6–1	L.A. Memorial Coliseum	27,000	Recap	
9	November 2	at **New York Yankees**	**L** 21–35	1–7–1	Yankee Stadium	21,714	Recap	
10	November 7	at Chicago Rockets	**L** 21–27	1–8–1	Soldier Field	5,395	Recap	
11	November 16	at **Brooklyn Dodgers**	**L** 14–21	1–9–1	Ebbets Field	9,604	Recap	
12	November 23	**Buffalo Bills**	**L** 14–33	1–10–1	Municipal Stadium	19,593	Recap	
13	November 30	Chicago Rockets	**W** 14–7	2–10–1	Municipal Stadium	14,085	Recap	
14	December 7	Cleveland Browns	**L** 0–42	2–11–1	Municipal Stadium	20,574	Recap	
Note: Intra-division opponents are in **bold** text.

=== Weekly Summaries ===
==== Week 1 ====
The Colts and Cleveland Browns had a bye during the first week of the 1947 AAFC season, which began with a Friday night game on August 29 at Soldier Field in Chicago, attended by more than 41,000 fans. The visiting Los Angeles Dons took the Chicago Rockets in the league opener by a score of 24–21.

==== Week 2 ====
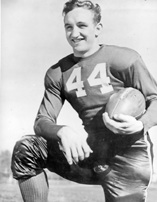
Colt Billy Hillenbrand scored the first kickoff return touchdown in team history in the franchise's debut game.

The Baltimore Colts franchise was formally launched on Sunday, September 7 when 27,418 fans filed into Baltimore Municipal Stadium to welcome the visiting Brooklyn Dodgers. The Colts era began with a wild play, in which the ball was kicked off to Dodger rookie Elmore Harris. Harris was contacted and fumbled the ball, which was recovered by Brooklyn teammate Harry Buffington and run back the wrong way to the end zone. At the last second, realizing his error, Buffington tossed the ball away — with Colt Jim Castiglia pouncing on the loose ball for a Baltimore touchdown. The Colts' Billy Hillenbrand returned the opening kickoff of the second half all the way for a second Baltimore TD in a game won by the Colts, 16–7.

==== Week 3 ====
The Colts traveled west to infamous Kezar Stadium to take on the San Francisco 49ers as their second opponent. The Colts scored just one time, a 90-yard touchdown drive in the second quarter that featured a 53-yard pass play from QB Bud Schwenk to former Georgia Bulldog end Lamar Davis. The Niners scored the game-winner in the third quarter, however, and held on to win, 14–7. The Colts finished with negative 35 yards rushing.

==== Week 4 ====
The battle of coaching minds between Cecil Isbell and Paul Brown turned out about how one might have anticipated when the Colts traveled to Cleveland to take on the AAFC Champion Cleveland Browns. Quarterback Otto Graham led the Browns to three first quarter touchdowns, quickly ending any hope of victory for the overmatched Colts. The Colts did manage to get the ball to the 4-yard line on a 56-yard pass play from Schwenk to Hillenbrand, but the Cleveland defense held and the visitors headed home with a 28–0 shutout loss on the books.

==== Week 5 ====
The New York Yankees came to Baltimore for a showdown in front of a record crowd of 51.583 fans. Even though the Colts outgained the Yankees 264 yards to 231, they found themselves playing from behind the entire game, down 14 points at the half. Colt QB Bud Schwenk got the green-and-silver inside the 10 yard line twice and to the New York 21 on another occasion but Baltimore was unable to push the ball across in a game plagued by turnovers and penalties. The halftime score of 21–7 held and the Colts fell to 1–3 on the year.

==== Week 6 ====
In front of a home crowd of 29,556, the Colts took advantage of five Forty-Niners' turnovers and QB Bud Schwenk passed for more than 200 yards for the first time in franchise history in jumping to a 14-point lead in the third period. It all came to naught, however, when Frankie Albert of the Niners threw two fourth quarter touchdown passes and San Francisco escaped with a 28–28 tie.

==== Week 7 ====
The Colts' week 9 visit to the Los Angeles Coliseum was a dispiriting 56–0 debacle.

The Colts traveled to Buffalo to play the Buffalo Bills. Once again, Baltimore jumped out to a two-score lead at the intermission, 15–7, only to falter in the second half. Trailing 20–15 with seconds remaining, the Colts' Bud Schwenk hit Lamar Davis with what appeared to be a game winning pass, only for Schwenk to have been ruled to have stepped out of bounds two feet short of the goal line. The final gun was fired prematurely, and teams and fans stormed the field in a chaotic finish. The Colts protested the outcome of the game to the league office, but the result stood.

==== Week 8 ====
Once again the Colts jumped out to a two-score lead before folding, this time in front of 36,852 fans in Baltimore Memorial Stadium. The Los Angeles Dons scored 38 unanswered points in the final three quarters to win a laugher, 38–10. In the contest the Colts were outgained by Los Angeles, 245 yards to 184. Dons kicker Ben Agajanian set an AAFC record by hitting a 53-yard kick in the game.

==== Week 9 ====
Following up on their 38-unanswered-point run against the Colts in Baltimore, the Los Angeles Dons dropped 56 more consecutive points on their heads at the Los Angeles Memorial Coliseum the very next week in a 56–0 annihilation that effectively broke the team's back. Powered by four touchdown passes by quarterback Glenn Dobbs, the Dons' win was the most-lopsided victory in AAFC history. The Colts could do nothing offensively, punting the ball 10 times for the day — another new AAFC record.

==== Week 10 ====
The Colts fell to 1–7–1 with a 35–21 loss to the New York Yankees in front of 21,714 people at Yankee Stadium. The Colts did manage to end their streak of scoreless quarters at 8 when QB Bud Schwenk hit halfback Billy Hillenbrand on a 21-yard passing play in the second quarter. The Colts again entered the AAFC record book by giving up 165 punt return yards and 301 combined return yards — including a touchdown runback by Bruce Alford on the opening kickoff of the game.

== Division standings ==
AAFC Eastern Division
	W	L	T	PCT	DIV	PF	PA	STK
New York Yankees	11	2	1	.846	5–1	378	239	W2
Buffalo Bills	8	4	2	.667	4–1–1	320	288	T1
Brooklyn Dodgers	3	10	1	.231	1–4–1	181	340	L3
Baltimore Colts	2	11	1	.154	1–5	167	377	L1

Note: Tie games were not officially counted in the standings.

== Coaching staff ==
- Head coach: Cecil Isbell
- Assistant coach: Nick Campofreda
- Assistant coach: Andy Hewlett
- Assistant coach: Tarzan Taylor
- Backfield coach: Don Edmonds
- Line coach: Tom Stidman

== Roster ==
Quarterbacks

- 63 John Galvin P/CB
- 64 Bud Schwenk

Backs

- 67 Ernie Case CB/QB
- 51 Lamar Davis CB/WR
- 88 Andy Dudish RB/CB
- 82 Billy Hillenbrand RB/CB
- 73 Bus Mertes FB
- 81 Rudy Mobley RB/CB
- 76 Frank SinkwichFB
- 77 Buzz Trebotich FB
- 87 Johnny Vardian S/RB

Ends/Receivers

- 57 Hub Bechtol
- 59 Lamar Blount
- 52 Ralph Jones
- 54 Floyd Konetsky
- 53 Elmer Madar
- 55 Gil Meyer

Lineman/Linebackers

- 35 Barry French G/DG
- 45 Ed Grain T/DT
- 24 Dick Handley LB/C
- 31 Luke Higgins G/DG
- 46 Mike Kasap DT/T
- 41 Al Klug DT/T
- 28 Joe Kodba C/LB
- 37 Augie Lio G/K/DG
- 34 Vic Marino DG/G
- 48 John Mellus T/DT
- 49 George Perpich T/DT
- 21 Mike Phillips C
- 71 John Wright LB/FB
- 30 Frank Yokas G/DG
- 33 George Zorich G/DG

rookies in italics
