= Frank Trigilio =

American football player (1919–1992)

No. 78, 72, 67
- Position: Fullback

Personal information
- Born: January 19, 1919; Oakfield, New York, U.S.
- Died: March 5, 1992 (aged 73); Honolulu, Hawaii, U.S.
- Listed height: 5 ft 11 in (1.80 m)
- Listed weight: 200 lb (91 kg)

Career information
- High school: Oakfield (NY)
- College: Alfred

Career history
- Los Angeles Dons (1946); Miami Seahawks (1946); Hawaiian Warriors (1947)

Awards and highlights
- PCPFL champion (1947)
- Stats at Pro Football Reference

Frank Joseph Trigilio (January 19, 1919 – March 5, 1992) was an American professional football fullback who played one season in the All-America Football Conference with the Los Angeles Dons and Miami Seahawks. He played college football at the University of Vermont and Alfred University.

== Early life and college ==
Frank Joseph Trigilio was born on January 19, 1919, in Oakfield, New York. He attended Oakfield High School in Oakfield.

Trigilio was a letterman for the Vermont Catamounts of the University of Vermont in 1938. He then played for the Alfred Saxons of Alfred University from 1940 to 1941.

Trigilio served in the United States Army Air Forces during World War II. He played football while in the Army Air Forces.

== Professional career ==
Trigilio signed with the Los Angeles Dons of the All-America Football Conference in 1946. He played in one game for the Dons, rushing three times for two yards, before being released.

Trigilio was then claimed off waivers by the Miami Seahawks on October 26, 1946. He appeared in seven games, starting one, for the Seahawks during the 1946 season, recording 38 carries for 124 yards and one touchdown. The Seahawks folded after the season and their assets were purchased to start the new Baltimore Colts.

Trigilio was offered a contract by the Colts but declined it to instead sign with the Hawaiian Warriors of the Pacific Coast Professional Football League (PCPFL) on August 8, 1947. He played in all nine games, starting four, for the Warriors during the 1947 season, rushing 54 times for 304 yards and three touchdowns while also catching ten passes for 48 yards and one touchdown. The Warriors went 7–2 that season, finishing in first place in the PCPFL. Trigilio was later the head coach of the Warriors in 1949, finishing with a 2–5 record.

== Personal life ==
Trigilio married Lorraine (nee Silva) while stationed in Hawaii during the war. They had a son named Frank Jr. in 1950. Trigilio also played basketball and baseball while in Hawaii, helping the Occidental Life Insurance basketball team win the Hawaii senior league title. He was a pitcher on a local baseball team. He died on March 5, 1992, in Honolulu, Hawaii.
