= 1946 Los Angeles Dons season =

American football team season

- Head coach: Dudley DeGroot
- Home stadium: Los Angeles Memorial Coliseum

Results
- Record: 7–5–2
- Division place: 3rd AAFC West
- Playoffs: Did not qualify

The 1946 Los Angeles Dons season was the inaugural season of the Los Angeles Dons in the All-America Football Conference. Led by head coach Dudley DeGroot, the Dons finished 7–5–2, third in the West division, and failed to qualify for the playoffs.

The team's statistical leaders included quarterback Charlie O'Rourke with 1,250 passing yards, John Kimbrough with 473 rushing yards, Dale Gentry with 341 receiving yards, and Joe Aguirre with 55 points scored (31 extra points, four field goals, and two touchdowns).

On September 13, 1946, in the first game in team history, the Dons defeated the Brooklyn Dodgers, 20-14, before a crowd of 18,995 at the Los Angeles Memorial Coliseum. Bud Nygren scored the first points on a touchdown pass from quarterback Charlie O'Rourke. With the ball at the Don's 40-yard line, Nygren caught the ball at the Brooklyn 30-yard line and ran the remaining distance to the end zone.

== Season schedule ==
Week	Date	Opponent	Result	Record	Attendance	Venue	Recap	Sources
1	Bye							
2	September 13	Brooklyn Dodgers	**W** 20–14	1–0	19,153	Los Angeles Memorial Coliseum	Recap	
3	September 20	Miami Seahawks	**W** 30–14	2–0	19,585	Los Angeles Memorial Coliseum	Recap	
4	September 29	at Buffalo Bisons	**T** 21–21	2–0–1	18,163	Civic Stadium	Recap	
5	October 5	at Chicago Rockets	**W** 21–9	3–0–1	31,076	Soldier Field	Recap	
6	October 12	**San Francisco 49ers**	**L** 14–23	3–1–1	11,736	Gilmore Stadium (LA)	Recap	
7	October 20	at **Cleveland Browns**	**L** 14–31	3–2–1	71,134	Cleveland Municipal Stadium	Recap	
8	October 27	New York Yankees	**L** 17–31	3–3–1	12,123	Los Angeles Memorial Coliseum	Recap	
9	November 3	**Cleveland Browns**	**W** 17–16	4–3–1	21,576	Los Angeles Memorial Coliseum	Recap	
10	November 10	at New York Yankees	**L** 12–17	4–4–1	30,765	Yankee Stadium	Recap	
11	November 17	at Brooklyn Dodgers	**W** 19–14	5–4–1	7,500	Ebbets Field	Recap	
12	November 25	at Miami Seahawks	**W** 34–21	6–4–1	9,987	Miami Orange Bowl	Recap	
13	December 1	Buffalo Bisons	**W** 62–14	7–4–1	22,496	Los Angeles Memorial Coliseum	Recap	
14	December 8	at **San Francisco 49ers**	**L** 7–48	7–5–1	25,000	Kezar Stadium	Recap	
15	December 15	**Chicago Rockets**	**T** 17–17	7–5–2	17,458	Los Angeles Memorial Coliseum	Recap	
Note: Intra-division opponents are in **bold** text.

== Division standings ==
AAFC Western Division
	W	L	T	PCT	DIV	PF	PA	STK
Cleveland Browns	12	2	0	.857	4–2	423	137	W5
San Francisco 49ers	9	5	0	.643	4–2	307	189	W3
Los Angeles Dons	7	5	2	.583	2–3–1	305	290	T1
Chicago Rockets	5	6	3	.455	1–4–1	263	315	T1

Note: Tie games were not officially counted in the standings.

== Roster ==
1946 Los Angeles Dons final roster
Quarterbacks: 65 Angelo Bertelli; 60 Bob Mitchell DB; 66 Charlie O'Rourke DB; Ends/Receivers: 57 Joe Aguirre K; 53 Dale Gentry; 50 Bud Kerr; 52 Al Krueger; 59 Jack Morton; 55 Bob Nowaskey	Backs: 82 Harry Clarke LB/FB; 94 Earl Elsey DB/RB; 93 Chuck Fenenbock RB; 77 John Kimbrough FB/LB; 75 Andy Marefos FB/LB; 90 Bus Mertes RB/DB; 85 Bud Nygren RB/DB; 73 John Polanski FB/LB; 83 Bob Seymour DB/RB; 97 Bob Sneddon DB/RB; 84 Paul Vinnola DB/RB	Linemen/Linebackers: 44 Lee Artoe T/DT; 42 Earl Audet T/DT; 40 Gil Duggan T/DT; 37 Ray Frankowski G/DG; 30 Al Lolotai DG/G; 47 Joe Mihal T/DT; 35 Paul Mitchell G/DG; 22 Bob Nelson LB/C/K; 20 Don Nolander C/LB; 33 Bill Radovich DG/G; 45 Bob Reinhard T/DT; 29 Hank Rockwell C; 32 Frank Yokas G/DG; rookies in italics
