= Frank Yokas =

American football player (1924–1994)

- Yokas in 1946

No. 32, 30
- Position: Guard

Personal information
- Born: February 27, 1924; Rock Island, Illinois, U.S.
- Died: May 12, 1994 (aged 70); Los Angeles California, U.S.
- Listed height: 5 ft 11 in (1.80 m)
- Listed weight: 210 lb (95 kg)

Career information
- High school: Rock Island (IL)

Career history
- Los Angeles Dons (1946); Baltimore Colts (1947)

Career AAFC statistics
- Games played: 25
- Starts: 2
- Stats at Pro Football Reference

Frank Peter Yokas (February 27, 1924 – May 12, 1994) was an American football player who played at the guard position.

Yokas before he went pro.

A native of Rock Island, Illinois, he attended Rock Island High School, received all-state honors as a football player, and graduated in 1943. He served in the Navy during World War II and played for the Great Lakes Navy and Saint Mary's Pre-Flight football team.

After the war, Yokas was recruited to play college football for Notre Dame, but he told coach Frank Leahy: "Coach, I'll eat them college kids alive."

Yokas played professional football in the All-America Football Conference (AAFC) for the Los Angeles Dons in 1946 and the Baltimore Colts in 1947. He appeared in a total of 25 AAFC games.

Yokas died in 1994 in Los Angeles.
