= Johnny Vardian =

American football player and coach (1921–1989)

No. 88, 87
- Positions: Halfback, defensive back

Personal information
- Born: September 25, 1921; Johnstown, Pennsylvania
- Died: August 8, 1989 (aged 67); Tampa, Florida
- Listed height: 5 ft 8 in (1.73 m)
- Listed weight: 167 lb (76 kg)

Career information
- High school: Johnstown Catholic (PA)

Career history
- Miami Seahawks (1946); Baltimore Colts (1947–1948)

Career statistics
- Games: 32
- Stats at Pro Football Reference

John Joseph Vardian (September 25, 1921 – August 8, 1989) was an American football player and coach. He played at the halfback and defensive back positions for the Miami Seahawks in 1946 and the Baltimore Colts in 1947 and 1948. He was an assistant coach for the Tampa Spartans football team from 1950 to 1961.

== Early years and military service ==
A native of Johnstown, Pennsylvania, he attended Johnstown Catholic High School. During World War II, he served in the United States Navy for three years. In the fall of 1945, he played for the Naval Amphib football team and was clocked at 10 seconds in the 100 fully attired in football equipment.

== Professional football ==
He played professional football in the All-America Football Conference (AAFC) for the Miami Seahawks in 1946 and the Baltimore Colts in 1947 and 1948. He appeared in a total of 32 AAFC games and carried the ball 46 times for 62 yards.

== Coaching and later years ==
After his playing career ended, Vardian was an assistant coach responsible for the defense for the Tampa Spartans football team from 1950 to 1960. After his coaching career, he remained in Tampa and went into the contracting business. He died in Tampa in 1989 at age 67.
