= Dick Horne =

American football player (1918–1964)

- Horne in 1946

No. 49, 54, 51
- Position: End

Personal information
- Born: September 4, 1918; Denver, Colorado, U.S.
- Died: November 9, 1964 (aged 46); Ventura County, California, U.S.
- Listed height: 6 ft 2 in (1.88 m)
- Listed weight: 214 lb (97 kg)

Career information
- High school: Woodrow Wilson Classical (Long Beach, California)
- College: Oregon

Career history
- New York Giants (1941); Miami Seahawks (1946); San Francisco 49ers (1947)

Career NFL + AAFC statistics
- Games played: 22
- Starts: 5
- Stats at Pro Football Reference

Richard Courtland Horne (September 4, 1918 – November 9, 1964) was an American football end.

== Biography ==
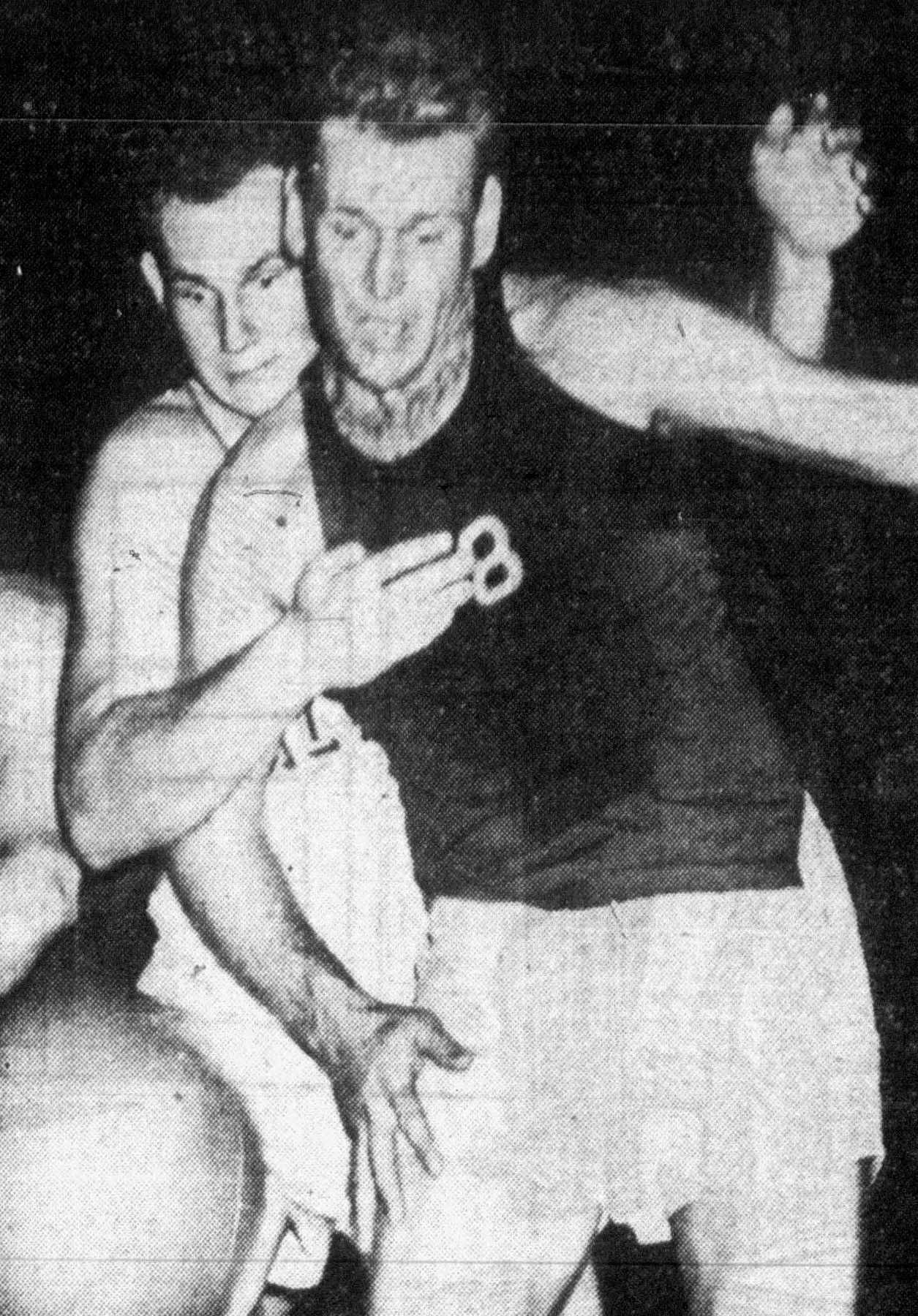
Horne (right) fighting for a loose basketball against USC Trojans center Jim Seminoff in 1943.

Dick Horne was born in Denver, in 1918, and attended Woodrow Wilson Classical High School in Long Beach, California. He played football at Compton Junior College and then, in 1939 and 1940, at the University of Oregon. He won the Hoffman Award as Oregon's outstanding senior football player in 1940.

Horne played professional football in the National Football League (NFL) for the New York Giants in 1941 and in the All-America Football Conference (AAFC) for the Miami Seahawks in 1946 and the San Francisco 49ers in 1947. He appeared in a total of 22 professional games, five of them as a starter, and caught eight passes for 117 yards.

Horne was later a businessman in Ventura, California. He died on November 9, 1964.
