= Bob Mitchell (American football) =

American football player (1922–1997)

- Bob Mitchell, 1941

No. 60, 97
- Positions: Halfback, quarterback, defensive back

Personal information
- Born: January 27, 1922; Turlock, California, U.S.
- Died: July 17, 1997 (aged 75); Apple Valley, California, U.S.
- Listed height: 5 ft 11 in (1.80 m)
- Listed weight: 195 lb (88 kg)

Career information
- High school: Turlock (CA)
- College: Stanford

Career history
- Los Angeles Dons (1946–1948)

Career AAFC statistics
- Games played: 37
- Starts: 7
- Rushing yards: 71
- Interceptions: 6
- Stats at Pro Football Reference

Robert Stanley Mitchell (January 27, 1922 – July 17, 1997) was an American football player who played at the halfback, quarterback, and defensive back positions. He played college football for Stanford and professional football for the Los Angeles Dons.

== Early life ==
Mitchell was born in 1922 in Turlock, California. He attended Turlock High School where he was a three-year letterman in football, basketball, and baseball.

== Military and college football ==
He played college football for Stanford from 1940 to 1943. He also served in the United States Navy during World War II. He also played for the Navy All-Stars in Honolulu and the Honolulu Bears.

== Professional football ==
In April 1946, Mitchell signed to play professional football in the All-America Football Conference for the Los Angeles Dons. He played for the Dons from 1946 to 1948, appearing in 37 games. He tallied 71 rushing yards on 42 carries (1.7 yards per carry), completed 4 of 12 passes for 34 yards, and caught 4 passes for 37 yards and a touchdown.

== Later life ==
Mitchell was a lifetime resident of California. In later life, he lived in Silver Lakes, California, and was the owner and operator of All American Uniform Rental prior to his retirement in 1984. He was inducted into the Turlock High School Athletic Hall of Fame in 1994. He died of cancer in July 1997 at St. Mary Regional Medial Center in Apple Valley, California.
