= Jack Espey =

American sports executive

Career history
- Washington Palace Five (1925–1927) Press agent; George Washington Colonials (1932–1936) Publicity director; Washington Redskins (1937–1942) General manager; Uline Arena (1943) General manager; Miami Seahawks (1946) General manager; Baltimore Colts (1947) General manager

Awards and highlights
- 2× NFL champion (1937, 1942)
- Executive profile at Pro Football Reference

Jack Espey was an American sports executive who served as general manager of the Washington Redskins, Miami Seahawks, and Baltimore Colts. He won two NFL championships with the Redskins in 1937 and 1942.

== Early career ==
Espey was a sportswriter for several Washington, D.C. newspapers, including The Washington Post. He was the press agent for the Washington Palace Five of the American Basketball League, but returned to the Post when the team folded.

== George Washington University ==
In 1932 he became the publicity director for George Washington University. He turned the Colonials football team into the "Capital's most colorful fall spectacle" by expanding the in-game attractions to include card stunts, drum majors, halftime shows, and a cannon. In 1936 he led a campaign to have Tuffy Leemans elected to the College All-Star team.

== Washington Redskins ==
In 1937, Espey became general manager of the Washington Redskins. He was with the team when they won the 1937 and 1942 National Football League championships. He left the club on April 1, 1943, to become the general manager of the Uline Arena. He resigned five months later to return to the newspaper business as the promotion manager of Washington Times-Herald.

== Miami Seahawks ==
In 1946, Espey became the general manager of the Miami Seahawks of the All-America Football Conference. In order to attract fans, Espey brought in high school bands and drums and bugle corps, spent $1,500 on a fireworks show that was hampered by rain, and brought in clown Felix Adler to perform at halftime. However, poor weather (it rained during six of the Seahawks seven home games and the home opener was postponed due to a hurricane) and an uncompetitive team led the Seahawks to draw about 7,000 fans per game. The Seahawks final home game saw about 2,500 fans turn up to the 35,000-seat Burdine Stadium.

== Baltimore Colts ==
The Seahawks folded after the season and Espey joined its successor in the AAFC, the Baltimore Colts. In June 1947 he asked a friend, Jo Lombardi, to compose a theme song for the team. Lombardi wrote the song with Benjamin Klasmer and Espey added a strain from Maryland, My Maryland near the end. The song was used by the first and second incarnations of the Colts and was adapted by John Ziemann and Todd Clontz for the Baltimore Ravens. Epsey was fired after the 1947 season.

== Later life ==
In 1948, Espey was a finalist to become manager of the D.C. Armory, but lost the job to Dutch Bergman. He served as a press agent for the Armory's annual sportsmen's and outdoors show and was on the publicity staff for the Presidential Cup. He eventually moved to Montgomery County, Maryland, where he worked in newspaper advertising and was vice president of the Paulin Publishing Company.
