= Fondren Mitchell =

American football player (1921–1952)

No. 84
- Positions: Halfback, defensive back

Personal information
- Born: June 19, 1921; Tallahassee, Florida, U.S.
- Died: September 24, 1952 (aged 31); Hillsborough County, Florida, U.S.
- Listed height: 6 ft 0 in (1.83 m)
- Listed weight: 185 lb (84 kg)

Career information
- High school: Leon (Tallahassee)
- College: Florida (1939–1942)
- NFL draft: 1943: 10th round, 84th overall pick

Career history
- Miami Seahawks (1946)

Career AAFC statistics
- Rushing yards: 17
- Rushing average: 3.4
- Receptions: 8
- Receiving yards: 131
- Stats at Pro Football Reference

Fondren Lack Mitchell (June 19, 1921 – September 24, 1952) was an American football halfback who played one season with the Miami Seahawks of the All-America Football Conference (AAFC). He was drafted by the Chicago Cardinals of the National Football League (NFL) in the tenth round of the 1943 NFL draft. He played college football at Florida.

== Early life ==
Mitchell won six individual state prep titles in track and field at Leon High School in Tallahassee, Florida. He won the shot put state title in 1937, 1938 and 1939, the discus state title in 1937 and 1938 and the long jump state title in 1939.

== College career ==
Mitchell lettered for the Florida Gators of the University of Florida from 1940 to 1942.

== Professional career ==
Mitchell was selected by the Chicago Cardinals of the NFL in the tenth round with the 84th overall pick in the 1943 NFL draft. He later signed with the AAFC's Miami Seahawks on May 18, 1946. He played for the Seahawks in 1946, catching eight passes for 131 yards and rushing for seventeen yards on five attempts. Mitchell also recorded one interception.

== Personal life ==
Mitchell served in the United States Army during World War II.
