= Joe Kodba =

American football player (1922–2005)

- Joe Kodba in 1947

No. 28
- Positions: Center, linebacker

Personal information
- Born: February 27, 1922; Yugoslavia
- Died: September 7, 2005 (aged 83); Swartz Creek, Michigan
- Listed height: 5 ft 11 in (1.80 m)
- Listed weight: 190 lb (86 kg)

Career information
- High school: Washington (IN)
- College: Butler, Purdue

Career history
- Baltimore Colts (1947)

Career statistics
- Games: 13
- Stats at Pro Football Reference

Joseph Stephen "Joe" Kodba (February 27, 1922 – September 7, 2005) was an American football player who played at the center and linebacker positions.

Kodba in 1946.

A native of Yugoslavia, he attended high school in South Bend, Indiana and played college football for Butler in 1941 and 1942 and Purdue in 1945 and 1946. He served as an Army paratrooper during World War II. He played professional football in the All-America Football Conference (AAFC) for the Baltimore Colts during the 1947 season. He appeared in a total of 13 AAFC games, three as a starter.

He was the head football coach at Fort Wayne North Side High School in 1948. In 1949, he was hired as an assistant football coach at Niagara University. He later returned to South Bend, Indiana, where he taught for 35 years. After retiring, he moved to Swartz Creek, Michigan, where he died in 2005 at age 83.
