= Dick Handley =

American football player (1922–2012)

No. 24
- Positions: Center, linebacker

Personal information
- Born: May 22, 1922; Tulare, California
- Died: February 8, 2012 (aged 89); Fresno, California
- Listed height: 6 ft 1 in (1.85 m)
- Listed weight: 215 lb (98 kg)

Career information
- High school: Corcoran (CA)
- College: Fresno State

Career history
- Baltimore Colts (1947)

Career statistics
- Games: 14
- Stats at Pro Football Reference

Richard H. Handley (May 22, 1922 – February 8, 2012) was an American football player who played at the center and linebacker positions.

A native of Tulare, California, he attended Corcoran High School and then played college football for Visalia Junior College and the Fresno State Bulldogs. During World War II, he served in the United States Marine Corps and played football for the El Toro Flying Marines football team. After the war, he returned to Fresno State and received his degree in 1947.

He signed to play professional football in the All-America Football Conference (AAFC) for the San Francisco 49ers but was traded to the Baltimore Colts. He played for the Colts during the 1947 season, appearing in a total of 14 AAFC games, three as a starter.

Handley quit the Colts after one season to return to school, obtaining a master's degree in education. He served as Fresno State's freshman football coach in 1948. In 1949, he was hired as the head football coach Porterville College. He later worked as a coach at Fresno City College and also served as an administrator from 1965 to 1978. In the 1970s, he developed a program at Fresno City College specializing in serving disadvantaged and physically handicapped students. After retiring, he continued to live in Fresno. He died in 2012 at age 89.
