= Buddy Jungmichel =

American football player and coach (1919–1982)

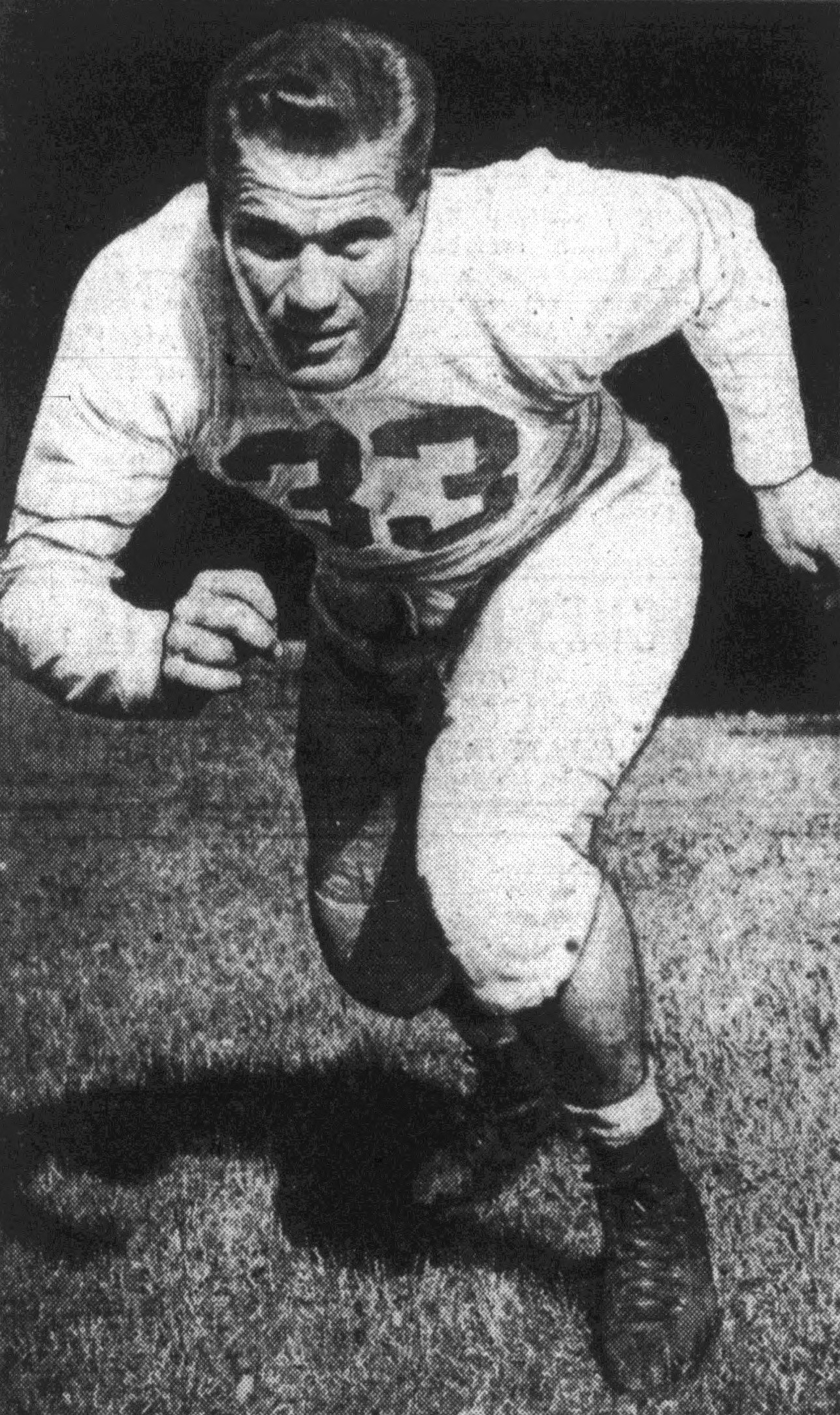
- Buddy Jungmichel c. 1946

No. 33
- Position: Guard

Personal information
- Born: October 18, 1919; Gonzales, Texas, U.S.
- Died: August 28, 1982 (aged 62); Austin, Texas, U.S.
- Listed height: 5 ft 9 in (1.75 m)
- Listed weight: 200 lb (91 kg)

Career information
- High school: Thorndale (Thorndale, Texas)
- College: Texas (1940–1941)
- NFL draft: 1942: 15th round, 138th overall pick

Career history
- Miami Seahawks (1946)

Awards and highlights
- Second-team All-SWC (1941)

Career AAFC statistics
- Games played: 14
- Games started: 13
- Interceptions: 1
- Stats at Pro Football Reference

Harold Neve "Buddy" Jungmichel (October 18, 1919 – August 28, 1982), sometimes spelled Jungmichael, was an American football guard and coach.

== Early life ==
Jungmichel was born in Gonzales, Texas, in 1919 and attended Thorndale High School in Thorndale, Texas. He played college football at Kilgore Junior College in 1937 and 1938, and then for the Texas Longhorns from 1939 to 1941.

== Professional football and military service ==
Jungmichel was selected by the New York Giants in the 15th round (138th overall pick) of the 1942 NFL draft. Jungmichel never joined the Giants, instead entering the Navy where he played on a Navy football team in San Diego.

He played in for the Miami Seahawks in the All-America Football Conference in 1946. He appeared in 14 professional football games, 13 of them as a starter. He was selected by both the United Press and the AAFC as a second-team guard on the 1946 All-AAFC football team.

== Coaching career ==
The Miami Seahawks disbanded after the 1946 season, and in 1947, Jungmichel accepted a position as an assistant football coach with the Texas Longhorns. He served as the freshman coach from 1947 to 1949. He later became a line coach. He left the Texas coaching staff in 1954 to go into the insurance business.

He died in 1982 in Austin, Texas.
