= Bud Nygren =

American football player and coach (1918–1984)

No. 85, 82
- Position: Halfback

Personal information
- Born: November 14, 1918; Minneapolis, Minnesota, U.S.
- Died: December 26, 1984 (aged 66); San Jose, California, U.S.
- Listed height: 5 ft 9 in (1.75 m)
- Listed weight: 193 lb (88 kg)

Career information
- College: Gustavus Adolphus, San Jose State

Career history

Playing
- Los Angeles Dons (1946); Brooklyn Dodgers (1947)

Coaching
- San Jose State (1947) Freshman coach; College of the Sequoias (1948–1950) Head coach

Career statistics
- Rushing yards: 111
- Receiving yards: 170
- Touchdowns: 1

Bernard Clifford "Bud" Nygren (November 14, 1918 – December 26, 1984) was an American football player and coach. He played college football at San Jose State Teachers College—now known as San Jose State University—and professionally for the Los Angeles Dons and Brooklyn Dodgers of the All-America Football Conference (AAFC). Nygren served as the head football coach at College of the Sequoias from 1948 to 1950.

== Early life ==
Born in Minneapolis, Nygren attended Forest Lake Area High School, graduating in 1936, where he was a multi-sport athlete. He began playing college football at Gustavus Adolphus College. He then transferred to San Jose State where he was selected as a Little All-American in 1940 and led the All-California Coast Conference in scoring. In September 1940 he was named the NBC National Player of the Week. He also received varsity letters in basketball and track and ran the 100 in 9.9 seconds.

Nygren served as a pilot in the United States Army Air Forces during World War II.

== Professional football ==
In 1946, Nygren played professional football in the All-America Football Conference (AAFC) as a right halfback for the Los Angeles Dons. On September 13, 1946, Nygren scored the first points in Los Angeles Dons team history on a touchdown pass from quarterback Charlie O'Rourke. With the ball at the Dons' 40-yard line, Nygren caught the ball at the Brooklyn 30-yard line and ran the remaining distance to the end zone. Nygren was a two-way player who was known as an "exceptional defender against passes."

In April 1947, the Dons traded Nygren to the Brooklyn Dodgers. He appeared in only one game for the Dodgers.

== Coaching career ==
After leaving the Dodgers, Nygren served as the freshman football coach at San Jose State in 1947. He next serve as the head football coach at Visalia Junior College/College of the Sequoias from 1948 to 1950. He became the head football coach at Grossmont High School in San Diego in 1951.

== High School Hall of Fame ==
Bud Nygren was a 2012 inductee to the Forest Lake Area High School Arts & Athletics Hall of Fame.
