= Walter Driskill =

Personal information
- Born: September 20, 1913; Austin, Texas, U.S.
- Died: July 25, 1998 (aged 84); Delray Beach, Florida, U.S.
- Listed height: 6 ft 1 in (1.85 m)
- Listed weight: 196 lb (89 kg)

Career information
- College: Colorado

Career history

Coaching
- Colorado (1936–1940) Assistant coach; Wyoming (1941) Assistant coach; Oklahoma (1946) Assistant coach; Maryland (1947) Assistant coach; Baltimore Colts (1949) Interim head coach

Operations
- Maryland Terrapins (1947–1948) Athletic director; Baltimore Colts (1948–1950) General manager; Baltimore Colts (1949) President

Walter Scott Driskill (September 20, 1913 – July 25, 1998) was an American football coach and administrator for the University of Maryland and the Baltimore Colts. After leaving football he worked in the brewing industry. He founded his own company, Dribeck Importers, that was the sole American importer of Beck's beer.

== Playing ==
Driskill earned his bachelor's in history from the University of Colorado in 1936 and his master's in history in 1940. He also played football for the school from 1931 until 1935, where he lettered three times as a tackle and was a teammate of Byron "Whizzer" White.

== Coaching ==
Driskill coached at Colorado for five seasons then moved to Wyoming. He served in the United States Navy during World War II as an officer assigned to the Navy's pre-flight educational program.

Driskill returned to coaching as an assistant to Jim Tatum at Oklahoma. He followed Tatum to Maryland in 1947. Before the season started, Driskill replaced Tatum, who wanted to focus on his duties as head football coach, as Maryland's athletic director.

In 1948, Driskill became the general manager of the Baltimore Colts. He became the team's president in 1949 and took over as head coach after the Colts got off to a poor start that year. He stepped down as head coach and president after the season, but remained as general manager.

== Head coaching record ==
| Team | Year | Regular season | | | | | Postseason |
| Team | Year | Won | Lost | Ties | Win % | Finish | Result |
|---|---|---|---|---|---|---|---|
| BAL | 1949 | 1 | 7 | 0 | .125 | 7th in AAFC | |
| Total | | 1 | 7 | 0 | .125 | | |

== Brewing ==
Driskill left football after the Colts folded. He was director of marketing of Ruppert Brewing Company and vice president of Gunther Brewing Company. In 1961 he became the director of marketing for Miller Brewing Company. He was fired by Miller in 1964 and started his own company, Dribeck Importers, which was the sole American importer of Beck's. He sold Dribeck to Beck's in 1989 for $28 million.

In 2009, Driskill's estate donated $750,000 to the University of Colorado's history department.
