= Joe Vetrano =

American football player and coach (1918–1995)

- Vetrano in 1949

No. 92, 82
- Positions: Halfback; Defensive back Kicker

Personal information
- Born: October 15, 1918; Neptune, New Jersey, U.S.
- Died: May 10, 1995 (aged 76); Berkeley, California, U.S.
- Listed height: 5 ft 9 in (1.75 m)
- Listed weight: 170 lb (77 kg)

Career information
- High school: Neptune (NJ)
- College: Southern Mississippi

Career history

Playing
- San Francisco 49ers (1946–1949)

Coaching
- San Francisco 49ers (1953–1956) (Asst); Southern Miss Golden Eagles (1967) (RB)

Career statistics
- Games played: 53
- Games started: 5
- Touchdowns: 2
- Field goals: 16 for 34 (45.7%)
- Longest field goal: 47
- Points scored: 247
- Stats at Pro Football Reference

Joseph George Vetrano (October 15, 1918 – May 10, 1995) was an American professional football halfback and placekicker who played four seasons with the San Francisco 49ers of the All-America Football Conference (AAFC). He played college football at the University of Southern Mississippi. He graduated from Neptune High School in Neptune Township, New Jersey in 1936 and was inducted in the school's inaugural Athletic Hall of Fame in 2009.

== College career ==
Vetrano played for the Southern Miss Golden Eagles from 1940 to 1942. He was inducted into the Southern Miss Golden Eagles M–Club Alumni Association Sports Hall of Fame on February 20, 1965.

== Professional career ==
Vetrano signed with the AAFC's San Francisco 49ers after serving in the United States Army Air Forces during World War II and played for the 49ers from 1946 to 1949. He was nicknamed "The Little Toe", which was later shortened to "The Toe", during his pro career and recorded an AAFC record 108 extra points. On one extra point attempt, holder Frankie Albert fumbled the snap and Vetrano scored the point on a drop kick. He told a story of mistakenly being sent in to kick on third down and ending up scoring a touchdown.

== Coaching career ==
Vetrano was an assistant coach for the San Francisco 49ers from 1953 to 1956. He also served as a chief scout for the 49ers. He helped the backfield as an assistant coach for the Southern Miss Golden Eagles in 1967. Vetrano later coached high school football in New Jersey.

== Death ==
Vetrano died of heart failure in Berkeley, California on May 10, 1995.
