= Earl Elsey =

American football player (1917–1972)

- Elsey, circa 1947

No. 2, 20, 6, 39, 00, 37, 3, 28, 94, 43
- Position: Halfback

Personal information
- Born: October 31, 1917; Ozark, Arkansas, U.S.
- Died: October 12, 1972 (aged 54); Los Angeles County, California, U.S.
- Listed height: 5 ft 8 in (1.73 m)
- Listed weight: 175 lb (79 kg)

Career information
- High school: Manual Arts (Los Angeles)
- College: Loyola
- NFL draft: 1940: undrafted

Career history
- Los Angeles Bulldogs (1940–1942); Los Angeles Mustangs (1943–1944); Los Angeles Bulldogs (1945); Los Angeles Dons (1946); Edmonton Eskimos (1949)

Career AAFC statistics
- Games played: 13
- All-purpose yards: 828
- Stats at Pro Football Reference

Earl Dean Elsey (October 31, 1917 – October 12, 1972) was an American professional football player who was a halfback for the Los Angeles Dons of the All-America Football Conference (AAFC). He played college football for the Loyola Lions.

== Early life ==
Earl Dean Elsey was born on October 31, 1917, in Ozark, Arkansas. He attended Manual Arts High School in Los Angeles.

== College career ==
Elsey played junior college football at Santa Monica Junior College from 1936 to 1937. He transferred to Loyola University of Los Angeles, where he played for the Lions from 1938 to 1939.

== Professional career ==
Elsey played for the Los Angeles Bulldogs of the Pacific Coast Professional Football League (PCPFL) from 1940 to 1942, winning the PCPFL title with them in 1940. He scored an interception-return touchdown in 1940 and a rushing touchdown in 1941.

Elsey then joined the PCPFL's Los Angeles Mustangs in 1943, scoring one rushing touchdown and one receiving touchdown. The Mustangs joined the American Football League (AFL) in 1944. Elsey started all ten games, scoring two receiving touchdowns, during the 1944 AFL season as the Mustangs went 3–7.

Elsey returned to the PCPFL in 1945, rejoining the Bulldogs. He appeared in seven games, starting six, for the Bulldogs during the 1945 season, rushing for 659 yards and one touchdown while also catching two touchdown passes.

Elsey signed with the Los Angeles Dons of the upstart All-America Football Conference (AAFC) on February 11, 1946. He played in 13 games, starting three, at halfback for the Dons in 1946, totaling 47 carries for 165 yards, 14 receptions for 179 yards, 15 kick returns for 335 yards, nine punt returns for 147 yards, and two interceptions on defense for two yards. He had a total of 828 all-purpose yards. Elsey broke his ankle in the 13th game of the season against the San Francisco 49ers on December 8, 1946. In January 1947, team president Benjamin F. Lindheimer signed Elsey to a two-year contract.

On August 6, 1947, it was reported that Elsey had been hired as the head football coach at Naval Operating Base Terminal Island. He was the Terminal Island Sailors coach during the 1947 season.

Elsey played in seven games (all starts) for the Edmonton Eskimos of the Western Interprovincial Football Union in 1949.

== Personal life ==
Elsey served in the United States Navy. He was a manager at the Bay 90's Restaurant in Manhattan Beach, California. He died on October 12, 1972, in Los Angeles County, California.
