= Joe Krivonak =

American football player (1918–1989)

No. 38
- Position: Guard

Personal information
- Born: July 30, 1918; Erie, Pennsylvania, U.S.
- Died: October 26, 1989 (aged 71)
- Listed height: 6 ft 2 in (1.88 m)
- Listed weight: 230 lb (104 kg)

Career information
- College: South Carolina
- NFL draft: 1942: 6th round, 49th overall pick

Career history
- Miami Seahawks (1946)

Career NFL statistics
- Games played: 4
- Stats at Pro Football Reference

Joseph Krivonak (July 30, 1918 – October 26, 1989) was an American professional football guard. He played professionally for the Miami Seahawks of the All-America Football Conference (AAFC).
