= Prince Scott =

American football player (1915–1993)

Profile
- Position: End

Personal information
- Born: June 30, 1915; Grapevine, Texas
- Died: April 13, 1993 (aged 75); Lindale, Texas
- Listed height: 6 ft 1 in (1.85 m)
- Listed weight: 190 lb (86 kg)

Career information
- High school: Grapevine (TX)
- College: Texas Tech

Career history
- Miami Seahawks (1946)
- Stats at Pro Football Reference

Prince Arthur Scott (June 30, 1915 – April 13, 1993) was an American football end.

Scott was born in Grapevine, Texas, in 1917 and attended Grapevine High School in that city. He and played college football for Texas Tech. He served in the Army Air Corps during World War II. He also played for the Third Air Force Gremlins football team in 1944 and 1945.

He played professional football in the All-America Football Conference for the Miami Seahawks in 1946. He appeared in a total of 14 professional games, seven of them as a starter, and caught 13 passes for 180 yards and two touchdowns.

He taught high school in Kilgore, Texas, for 12 years. He moved to Lindale, Texas, in 1974 and died in 1993 at a nursing home in that city.
