= Al Ennis =

American football executive and tennis player

Profile
- Position: Executive

Personal information
- Born: 1897
- Died: February 8, 1958 (aged 60–61)

Career history
- Philadelphia Eagles (1942–1946) Publicity Director; Philadelphia Eagles (1947) General manager; Baltimore Colts (1950) General manager; Dallas Texans (1952) General manager
- Executive profile at Pro Football Reference

Al Ennis (1897 – February 8, 1958) was an American football executive and tennis player. He was the general manager of the Philadelphia Eagles in 1947, for the Baltimore Colts in 1950 and for the Dallas Texans in 1952.

From 1942 to 1946 he was the publicity director of the Eagles. He stepped down after one season as the general manager. From 1950 until his death in 1958, he was on the National Football League (NFL) staff. He also served as the general manager of the Baltimore Colts in 1950 and for the Dallas Texans in 1952. Ennis was a professional tennis player from the 1920s to the 1930s.
