= Hotel Whitcomb =

Historic hotel in San Francisco

Coordinates: 37.7781°N 122.4150°W

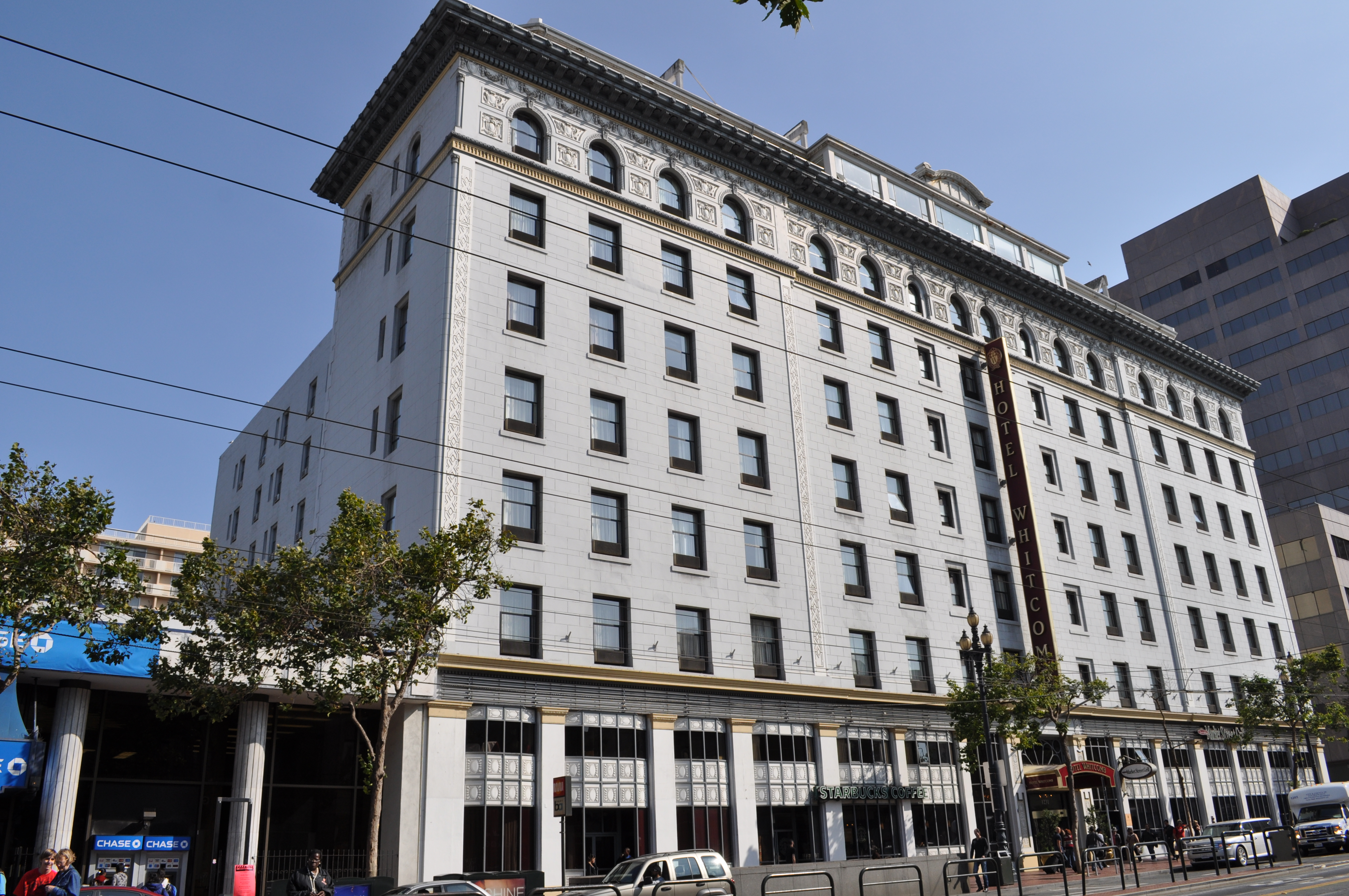
- Hotel Whitcomb, 2009
- Interactive map of the Hotel Whitcomb area

General information
- Location: 1231 Market Street, San Francisco

The Hotel Whitcomb is a historic hotel, located at 1231 Market Street in San Francisco. The building was completed in 1912 as San Francisco's temporary city hall and reopened in 1917 as the Hotel Whitcomb.

== History ==
=== Temporary city hall ===
Plans for the building began in 1910 with the hiring of architects Wright & Rushforth and an agreement to lease the building for three years to the City of San Francisco as a temporary city hall (the old San Francisco City Hall was destroyed by fire spawned by the 1906 San Francisco earthquake). From the outset, the intention was to convert the building into a hotel once the new, permanent city hall was completed. The staggered uses required the architects to prepare "two sets of drawings, one superimposing the plans for the municipal building upon the plans for the hotel."

The eight-story, steel-and-concrete building opened as the temporary city hall in March 1912. The basement of the building served as a city jail during this time.

=== Hotel use ===
With the completion of San Francisco City Hall in 1916, the building was converted into the 400-room Hotel Whitcomb, which opened on March 31, 1917. The hotel was named for the late Adolphus Carter Whitcomb, whose estate owned the property.

When it opened, the hotel was proclaimed "the last word in modern hoteldom" with "the most modern fireproof construction", Pavenazetta marble, and a palm-filled, glass-enclosed observation deck and sun parlor on the roof. The owners also imported 300,000 feet of Central American Jenezerro hardwood which was used to manufacture furniture, doors, and other interior work for the hotel. The total cost of the project was placed at more than $2.25 million, including $700,000 for original construction of the temporary city hall, $400,000 for structural changes to convert the building into a hotel, and $150,000 for furnishings.

In 1922, a new wing with an additional 102 guest rooms was added at a cost of $250,000 for the structure and another $100,000 for the furnishings and equipment. The Whitcomb included a large ballroom from which concerts were broadcast during the property's heyday.

During World War II, the Whitcomb provided office space for the Office for Emergency Management, the organization responsible for, among many other things, organizing and administering the internment of Japanese Americans. After the war, it was returned to use as a hotel, renamed The Whitcomb Motor Hotel.

In 1963, The Whitcomb was converted into permanent residential rentals, with no transient occupancy. During this period, the property was known simply as The Whitcomb. In 1967, the property became a hotel again, renamed the San Franciscan Hotel, then the PSA Hotel San Franciscan, then the San Franciscan Hotel again, and in 1992 the Ramada Plaza Downtown San Francisco, before the Hotel Whitcomb name was restored in 2007.

In 2020, the hotel closed due to the COVID-19 pandemic and was converted to a homeless shelter. During a period of 33 months, the structure was damaged heavily and was the site of 21 overdose deaths. The owner, RFR Holdings, sued the city and won a settlement but did not carry out renovations. Unable to sell the distressed property, it entered foreclosure proceedings in 2025 under the control of Blackstone, the global investment company.
