= Frank Hrabetin =

American football player (1915–2004)

- Frank Hrabetin, c. 1943

Profile
- Position: Tackle

Personal information
- Born: December 1, 1915; Cedar Rapids, Iowa
- Died: March 27, 2004 (aged 88); Tucson, Arizona
- Listed height: 6 ft 4 in (1.93 m)
- Listed weight: 233 lb (106 kg)

Career information
- High school: George Washington (IA)
- College: Loyola
- NFL draft: : 1st overall pick

Career history
- Philadelphia Eagles (1942); Brooklyn Dodgers (1946); Miami Seahawks (1946)
- Stats at Pro Football Reference

Frank George Hrabetin (December 1, 1915 – March 27, 2004) was an American football tackle.

Hrabetin was born in Cedar Rapids, Iowa, in 1915 and attended Redondo Union High School in Redondo Beach, California. He played college football at Loyola of Los Angeles from 1939 to 1941.

He played professional football as a tackle in the National Football League for the Philadelphia Eagles in 1942 and in the All-America Football Conference for the Brooklyn Dodgers and Miami Seahawks in 1946. He appeared in a total of 17 games, three of them as a starter. He missed the 1943, 1944, and 1945 seasons due to service in the Navy during World War II.

He died in 2004 in Tucson, Arizona.
