= John Blackinger =

American football executive (1905–1986)

Mayor of Atherton, California
- In office December 1969 – March 1976
- Preceded by: John Licata
- Succeeded by: Reynolds Smith

Vice mayor of Atherton, California
- In office April 1968 – December 1969
- Preceded by: Robert R. Bowen
- Succeeded by: Edward Turkington

Atherton City Council
- In office 1964–1976
- Preceded by: Nate Most

Personal details
- Born: July 6, 1905 Boise, Idaho, U.S.
- Died: October 31, 1986 (aged 81) Stanford, California, U.S.
- Education: University of Santa Clara

Military service
- Branch/service: United States Navy
- Years of service: 1942–1946
- Rank: Lieutenant commander
- Unit: Western Sea Frontier
- Battles/wars: World War II
- Football career

Career information
- High school: Boise (ID)

Career history
- Santa Clara (1927) Manager; San Francisco 49ers (1946–1947) General manager
- Executive profile at Pro Football Reference

John Regan Blackinger (July 6, 1905 – October 31, 1986) was an American football executive and politician. He served as the first general manager of the San Francisco 49ers from 1946 to 1947 and later was the mayor of Atherton, California.

== Biography ==
Blackinger was born on July 6, 1905, in Boise, Idaho. He attended Boise High School, graduating in 1923, and spent one year working at the Boise City National Bank before enrolling at the University of Santa Clara. He "showed the instincts of an executive" at a young age; in high school, he managed the newspaper The Courier, was a member of ROTC, and participated in dramatic plays. He was president of the executive board of managers at Santa Clara, played a prominent role in the school's annual Passion Play, and was the manager of Santa Clara's football team as a senior. He graduated from the school in 1928 with a bachelor's degree in philosophy and one year later received a prominent position at the American Trust Bank of San Francisco.

Blackinger also worked as rooms clerk of the William Taylor Hotel before becoming the clerk of the Boise Hotel in 1931. By 1937, he was the manager of Hotel Whitcomb in San Francisco. He served on the San Francisco Grand Jury in 1937. He moved to Atherton, California, in 1938, and stopped work as a hotel manager by the following year, then becoming an employee at the Spreckels-Russell Dairy Company, where he eventually rose to vice president of marketing. He served in World War II in the United States Navy as part of the Western Sea Frontier, serving from 1942 to 1946 and retiring as a lieutenant commander.

When the San Francisco 49ers of the All-America Football Conference (AAFC) were founded in 1945, Blackinger was hired as the team's general manager. He was able to receive the job due to being a college friend of team founder Tony Morabito; Blackinger hired typist and friend Louis Spadia (who ultimately was his successor) and publicist Buzz McGee to make up a three-man 49ers team office. He helped run the team in the startup AAFC, a competitor to the National Football League (NFL), and was in his position for two years before resigning and being succeeded by Spadia: the team had a record of 9–5 in 1946 and 8–4–2 in 1947. He left the 49ers to continue working in the dairy business, and retired from that job in 1970.

In 1961, Blackinger received an appointment to the Atherton Planning Commission; three years later, he was appointed to the City Council upon the retirement of Nate Most. He ran for election to the City Council in 1968 and won. He also that year became the vice mayor of the city, and in December 1969, after the resignation of John Licata, became the mayor. He served in each of these positions before retiring in 1976.

Blackinger was a member of the San Francisco Rotary Club, Menlo Country Club, St. Francis Yacht Club, Atherton Civic Interest League and Holbrook-Palmer Park. His first wife, Dorothy, predeceased him in 1982; he remarried to Audrey T. Blackinger. He died at Stanford University Hospital on October 31, 1986, at the age of 81.
