= Dick Renfro =

American football player (1919–1998)

No. 73
- Positions: Fullback, linebacker

Personal information
- Born: January 25, 1919; Fort Worth, Texas, U.S.
- Died: November 10, 1998 (aged 79); Eureka, California, U.S.
- Listed height: 5 ft 10 in (1.78 m)
- Listed weight: 200 lb (91 kg)

Career information
- High school: Glendale (Glendale, California)
- College: Washington State
- NFL draft: 1943: 11th round, 91st overall pick

Career history
- San Francisco 49ers (1946)
- Stats at Pro Football Reference

Golie Richard Renfro (January 25, 1919 – November 10, 1998) was an American professional football player for the San Francisco 49ers of the All-America Football Conference (AAFC). He played college football for the Washington State Cougars and was selected by the Detroit Lions in the 11th round of the 1943 NFL draft.

== Early life ==
Golie Richard Renfro was born on January 25, 1919, in Fort Worth, Texas. He attended Glendale High School in Glendale, California.

== College career ==
Renfro enrolled at Washington State University to play college football for the Cougars. He was a three-year letterman in 1939, 1940, and 1942 as a quarterback. He left school before the 1941 season to work on his father-in-law's farm. Renfro returned to Washington State in 1942.

== Professional career ==
Renfro was selected by the Detroit Lions in the 11th round, with the 91st overall pick, of the 1943 NFL draft but did not sign with them. On August 28, 1943, he was the starting quarterback for the college all-stars in the 1943 Chicago Charities College All-Star Game, leading them to a 27–7 victory over the Washington Redskins. He was also the starting quarterback for the West team in the East–West Shrine Game played on January 1, 1944. The West tied the East 13–13. Renfro was an assistant football coach at Washington State during the 1943 season.

Renfro served in the United States Army Air Forces during World War II. He played for the 1944 Second Air Force Superbombers football team, which finished 20th in the college football AP poll that year.

Renfro joined the San Francisco 49ers of the All-America Football Conference (AAFC) in 1946. On September 15, 1946, he scored three rushing touchdowns in a 21–14 victory over the Miami Seahawks, the first win in franchise history. He played in three games overall, all starts, for the 49ers during the 1946 season, rushing 18 times for 85 yards and three touchdowns while also returning one kick for 20 yards. Renfro suffered a career-ending knee injury.

== Personal life ==
Renfro died on November 10, 1998, in Eureka, California.
