= Andy Hewlett =

American sports coach

Playing career
- 1923–1927: Davidson

Coaching career (HC unless noted)
- 1947: Baltimore Colts (AAFC) (backs)
- 1948: Washington College
- 1950: Georgetown (KY)

Basketball
- 1950–1951: Georgetown (KY)

Andy Hewlett was an American football and basketball coach. He served as the head football coach at Washington College in Chestertown, Maryland in 1948 and Georgetown College in Georgetown, Kentucky in 1950. Hewlett was also the head basketball coach at Georgetown for one season, in 1950–51. He previously worked as the backfield coach for the Baltimore Colts of the All-America Football Conference (AAFC) in 1947.
