= Jim Reynolds (American football) =

American football player (1920–1985)

No. 58, 73
- Positions: Fullback, linebacker

Personal information
- Born: January 8, 1920; LaGrange, Georgia, U.S.
- Died: January 30, 1985 (aged 65); Chatham County, Georgia, U.S.
- Listed height: 6 ft 1 in (1.85 m)
- Listed weight: 190 lb (86 kg)

Career information
- High school: LaGrange
- College: Auburn (1939–1942)
- NFL draft: 1943: 6th round, 46th overall pick

Career history
- Miami Seahawks (1946)

Career AAFC statistics
- Rushing yards: 96
- Rushing average: 3
- Receptions: 1
- Receiving yards: 32
- Stats at Pro Football Reference

James Albert Reynolds (January 8, 1920 – January 30, 1985) was an American professional football fullback.

Reynolds was born in LaGrange, Georgia, in 1920 and attended LaGrange High School in that city. He played college football at Auburn.

He played professional football for the Miami Seahawks of the All-America Football Conference in 1946. He appeared in seven games, two of them as a starter. He rushed for 96 yards and two touchdowns on 32 carries.

He died in 1985 in Chatham County, Georgia.
