= Cotton Price =

American football player (1918–2008)

Profile
- Position: Quarterback / Tailback

Personal information
- Born: May 31, 1918; Bridgeport, Texas, U.S.
- Died: September 24, 2008 (aged 90); Lubbock, Texas, U.S.

Career information
- College: Texas A&M

Career history
- Detroit Lions (1940–1945); Miami Seahawks (1946)

Awards and highlights
- Pro Bowl (1940); National champion (1939)

Career statistics
- Passing attempts: 225
- Passing completions: 94
- Completion percentage: 41.8%
- TD–INT: 8–24
- Passing yards: 1,314
- Passer rating: 33.5
- Stats at Pro Football Reference

Charles Walemon "Cotton" Price (May 31, 1918 – September 24, 2008) was an American football quarterback, running back and defensive back. He attended Newcastle High School in Newcastle, Texas. He played college football at Texas A&M University and went on to play four seasons in the National Football League (NFL) and All-America Football Conference (AAFC). Price made the Pro Bowl in 1940.
