= Bill Radovich =

American gridiron football player and actor (1915–2002)

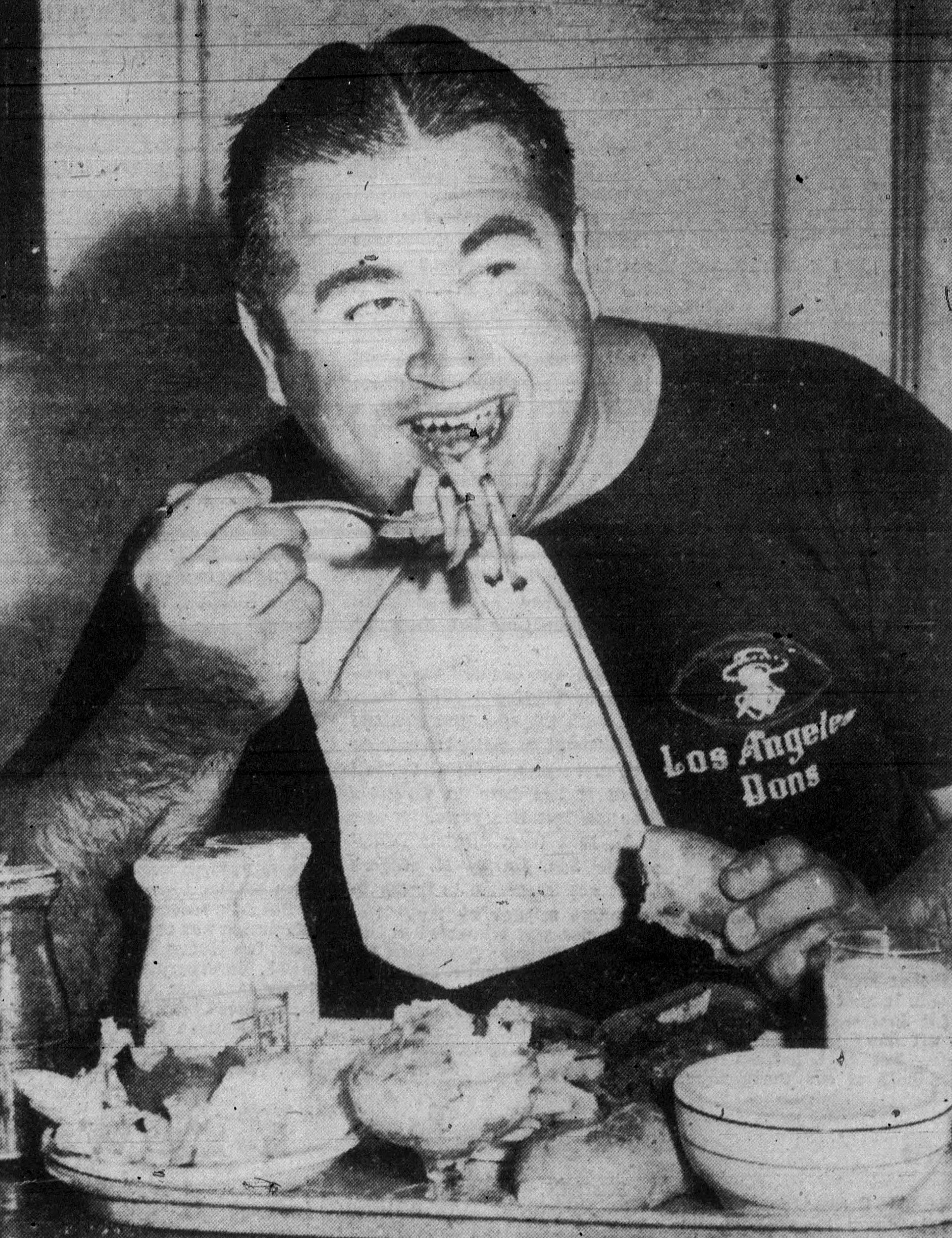
- Radovich, circa 1947

Profile
- Position: Guard

Personal information
- Born: June 24, 1915; Chicago, Illinois
- Died: March 6, 2002 (aged 86); Newport Beach, California
- Listed height: 5 ft 10 in (1.78 m)
- Listed weight: 270 lb (122 kg)

Career information
- College: USC

Career history

Playing
- 1938–1941: Detroit Lions
- 1945: Detroit Lions
- 1946–1947: Los Angeles Dons (AAFC)
- 1949: Edmonton Eskimos

Coaching
- 1949: Edmonton Eskimos (Line coach)

William Alex Radovich (June 24, 1915 – March 6, 2002) was a National Football League guard and a film actor who regularly played the "tough guy". He was the first NFL player to file suit against the league.

== College career ==
Radovich played college football at the University of Southern California.

== Professional career ==
Radovich as a member of the Los Angeles Dons in 1946.

In 1938, he was not selected in the 1938 NFL draft, but Radovich began his NFL career as a guard with the Detroit Lions after being signed, picking them because they offered an off-season job. Radovich played five seasons in the National Football League with the Detroit Lions. He was named All-Pro twice.

During World War II he served in the Navy from 1941 to 1945. He returned to the Lions after the war ended, in 1945. He expressed a desire for either better pay or to be traded to the Los Angeles Rams during the year, since his father was seriously ill and living near the city. Owner Fred Madel Jr refused and told him he would not be able to play anywhere but Detroit. However, since his contract had expired, Radovich signed with the All-America Football Conference and the Los Angeles Dons, regardless of if he was on the blacklist for five years as Madel stated.

=== Lawsuit ===
True enough, in 1948, Radovich saw a potential job as player and coach for the San Francisco Clippers of the Pacific Coast Professional Football League (PCPFL) slip away due to its affiliation with the NFL as a minor league. Radovich was forced to look for different kinds of work, and one of them was as a waiter at Los Angeles's Brown Derby restaurant. It was there that he met Joseph Alioto, former antitrust litigator with the Justice Department, who elected to file a legal brief on his behalf. The lower courts dismissed the suit in 1949, but in 1955, the U. S. Supreme Court ruled in his favor by a decision of 6-3 that felt that all professional sports but baseball were subject to antitrust laws and that the case must be retried. Radovich took the advice of his attorney Maxwell Keith to drop the case and accept a $42,500 settlement from the league.

Radovich worked as a position coach in the Canadian Football League before settling in Los Angeles. While he did not play in pro football again, his case inspired Marvin Miller, executive director of the Major League Baseball Players Association to challenge baseball's reserve clause in the late 1960s, noting the exemption baseball had from antitrust laws.

== After football ==
He served for many years as an executive at Washington Iron Works along with being a member of the Trojan Football Alumni Club. On occasion, he would take on "tough-guy" roles on film. He is best remembered as Moose McCall in Trouble Along the Way, Ogeechuk in The World in His Arms, Eunuch in The Golden Blade, Lagi in Back to God's Country, Hassan in Against All Flags and many other tough character roles.

== Personal life ==
Radovich never married. He had a brother, Walt, and a sister, Gloria Kaye Clinton. He died on March 6, 2002, and funeral services were held at St. Sava Serbian Orthodox Church in San Gabriel, California.
