= George Zorich =

American football player (1918–1967)

- George Zorich, c. 1941

No. 14, 35, 33
- Position: Guard

Personal information
- Born: November 24, 1918; Wakefield, Michigan, U.S.
- Died: October 14, 1967 (aged 47); Rensselaer, Indiana, U.S.
- Listed height: 6 ft 2 in (1.88 m)
- Listed weight: 213 lb (97 kg)

Career information
- High school: Wakefield (MI)
- College: Northwestern

Career history
- Chicago Bears (1944-1945); Miami Seahawks (1946); Baltimore Colts (1947)

Awards and highlights
- Second-team All-Big Ten (1941)
- Stats at Pro Football Reference

George Zorich (November 24, 1918 – October 14, 1967), was an American football guard.

Zorich was born in 1918 at Wakefield, Michigan, located in the iron region of Michigan's Upper Peninsula. He attended Wakefield High School, graduating in 1937. He played college football at the guard position for Northwestern from 1939 to 1941. He graduated from Northwestern in February 1941 with a degree in history and education. He joined the Army in 1942 after the United States' entry into World War II. He served in the Coast Artillery and attained the rank of second lieutenant.

He played professional football in the National Football League (NFL) for the Chicago Bears from 1944 to 1945 and in the All-America Football Conference (AAFC) for the Miami Seahawks in 1946 and the Baltimore Colts in 1947. He appeared in 35 professional football games, 17 of them as a starter.

After retiring from football, Zorich worked as an insurance broker in Rensselaer, Indiana. He died in 1967 in Rensselaer.
