= Dick Erdlitz =

American football player (1920–2006)

Profile
- Position: Running back

Personal information
- Born: February 16, 1920; Menominee Township, Michigan, U.S.
- Died: April 3, 2006 (aged 86); Melbourne, Florida, U.S.
- Listed height: 5 ft 10 in (1.78 m)
- Listed weight: 181 lb (82 kg)

Career information
- High school: Oshkosh (Oshkosh, Wisconsin)
- College: Northwestern
- NFL draft: 1942: undrafted

Career history
- Philadelphia Eagles (1942, 1945); Miami Seahawks (1946)

Awards and highlights
- All-Western Conference honors; College All-Star Game (1942)

Career NFL statistics
- Rushing attempts: 27
- Rushing yards: 93
- Touchdowns: 1
- Stats at Pro Football Reference

Richard Alfred Erdlitz (February 16, 1920 – April 3, 2006) was an American professional football player who was a running back in the National Football League (NFL) and All-America Football Conference (AAFC). He played for the Philadelphia Eagles in 1942 and 1945 and for the Miami Seahawks in 1946. He played college football and college baseball at Northwestern.

== College career ==
While playing college football for the Northwestern Wildcats, Erdlitz earned All-Western Conference honors. He was invited to play in the College All-Star Game as the starting quarterback for the College All-Stars on August 28, 1942.

Erdlitz also played college baseball at Northwestern.

== Professional career ==
=== Philadelphia Eagles ===
Erdlitz played for the Philadelphia Eagles in 1942.

== Coaching career ==
In 1943, Erdlitz was an assistant coach at Miami Edison High School.
