= Lamar Davis =

American football player (1921–2008)

- Davis with the Baltimore Colts in 1948

No. 56, 51
- Position: End

Personal information
- Born: June 15, 1921; Brunswick, Georgia, U.S.
- Died: February 23, 2008 (aged 86); St. Simons Island, Georgia, U.S.
- Listed height: 6 ft 1 in (1.85 m)
- Listed weight: 185 lb (84 kg)

Career information
- High school: Glynn Academy (Brunswick)
- College: Georgia (1939–1942)
- NFL draft: 1943: 2nd round, 12th overall pick

Career history
- Philadelphia Eagles (1943)*; Miami Seahawks (1946); Baltimore Colts (1947–1949)
- * Offseason or practice squad member only

Awards and highlights
- National champion (1942)

Career AAFC statistics
- Receptions: 147
- Receiving yards: 2,103
- Receiving touchdowns: 12
- Rushing yards: 78
- Rushing average: 4.6
- Stats at Pro Football Reference

Raymond Lamar "Racehorse" Davis (June 15, 1921 – February 23, 2008) was an American football player. He played professionally in the All-America Football Conference (AAFC) with the Miami Seahawks in 1946 and the Baltimore Colts from 1947 to 1949.

== Biography ==
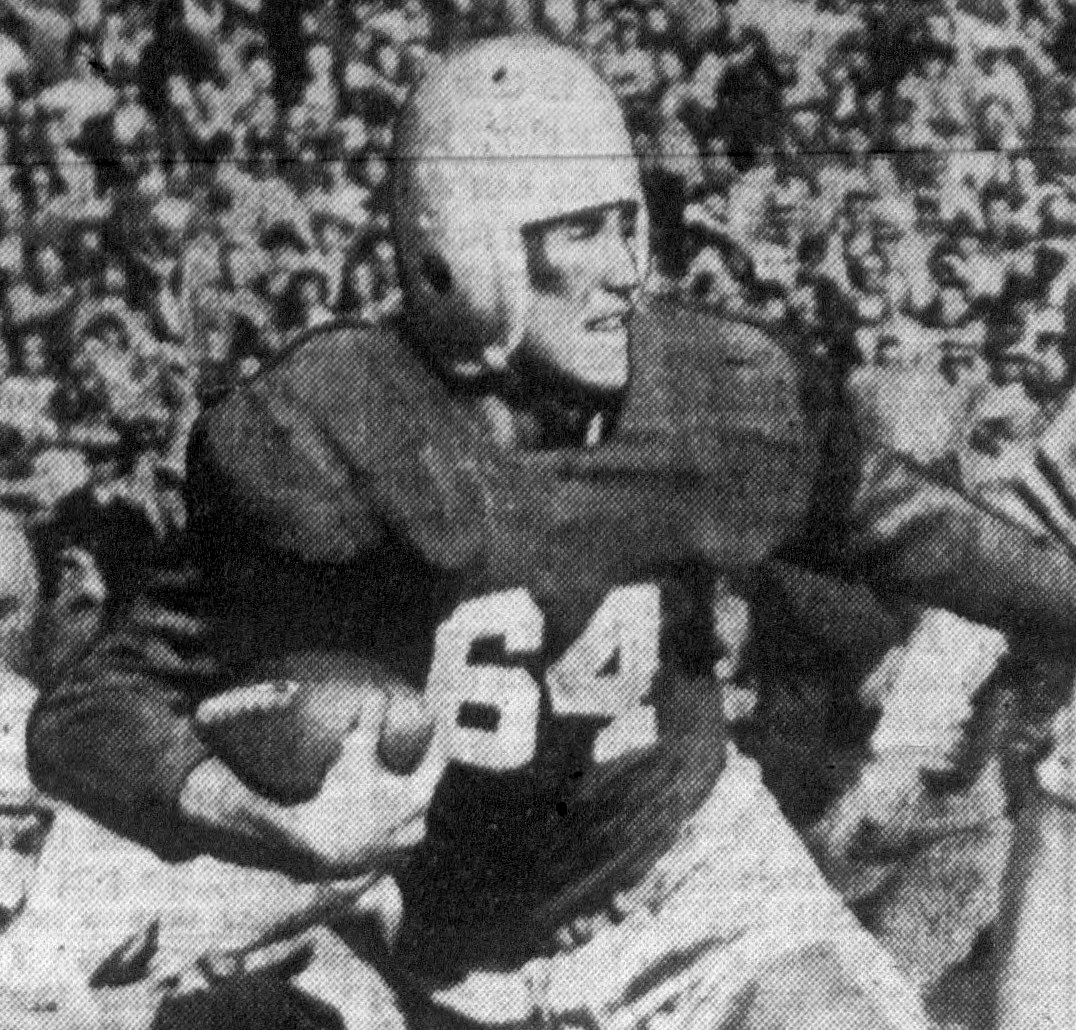
Davis in the 1943 Rose Bowl.

Lamar Davis was born in Brunswick, Georgia, where he attended Glynn Academy. He went to college at the University of Georgia and played for the Bulldogs from 1940 until 1942. He was also a sprinter on the Georgia track and field team.

He was a member of the 1942 Georgia team that won the Southeastern Conference (SEC) title and a national championship. His catch that season of a 65-yard touchdown pass thrown by Frank Sinkwich as the final gun sounded to help Georgia beat Auburn.

Davis, nicknamed "Racehorse", was drafted by the Philadelphia Eagles in the second round with the 12th overall pick of the 1943 NFL draft before they merged with the Pittsburgh Steelers to become the so-called "Steagles." He did not play for that team, however.

Davis' career was interrupted by World War II and he did not play professional football from 1942 through 1945. He returned in 1946 to play for the Miami Seahawks of the All-America Football Conference and later for their successor organization, the first Baltimore Colts. He was one of the few players from the Miami team that were retained by the new Colts organization.

Listed at 6'1" and 185 pounds, he played on offense and defense scoring numerous touchdowns as a receiver and making several interceptions as a pro.

Davis resided in St. Simons Island, Georgia, where he operated a business.

Davis was inducted into the State of Georgia Sports Hall of Fame in 1990.
