= Benjamin Klasmer =

American musician

Benjamin Klasmer was a professional violinist and composer notable for his contributions to the musical culture of 20th century Baltimore, Maryland. Born in Horondenka, Austria in 1891, Klasmer moved to the United States in 1909 after receiving considerable classical training as a violinist from several notable composers. Settling first in New York City, where he played with the German Musical Comedy Theater, Klasmer moved to Richmond, VA, in 1913 to play in the Bijou Theater Orchestra there. During his years in Richmond, he was the first conductor of the Young Men's Hebrew Association Orchestra. In 1916 he moved to Baltimore where he spent the remainder of his career.

Once established in Baltimore, Klasmer assisted the conductor, Gustav Strube in founding the Baltimore Symphony Orchestra, where he played in the violin section for many years. He also began performing and conducting for several local pit orchestras, most notably as the conductor of the pit orchestra at the Hippodrome Theatre, Baltimore. The orchestras he conducted at various Baltimore theaters, including the New Theater, the Garden Theater, the Rivoli, and the Hippodrome, furnished musical accompaniment to silent movies and to vaudeville acts. It was with the revival of vaudeville at the Hippodrome Theater on August 28, 1931, that Klasmer began his tenure there, which lasted until he died of a heart attack at the theater in 1949.

One of Klasmer's proudest legacies, however, was as the conductor of the youth orchestra at Baltimore's Jewish Educational Alliance (J.E.A.), which he founded with Emile Clarke in 1919. After a few years under Klasmer's tutelage, the twenty-seven member youth orchestra had grown into the J.E.A. Symphony Orchestra with eighty musicians, and was regarded as the finest amateur orchestra on the East Coast of the United States. The Baltimore Sun frequently praised the orchestra for both development and quality of performance, and the Beethoven-laden seasons of new music appeared frequently in the newspaper.

Throughout the Great Depression Klasmer found work as a musician and conductor, but after, as orchestras began to disappear from movie houses and vaudeville declined as a popular form of entertainment, Klasmer continued to perform at the Hippodrome as part of a two-person comedy/music act and to write music for local ventures. Klasmer composed a variety of music, largely for the violin, as well as a number of popular songs. His most famous work was the official theme song of the Baltimore Colts football team , which he co-wrote with Jo Lombardi in 1947.

The name, "Klasmer," means "musician" in Yiddish. (see klezmer)
