= Jimmy Tarrant =

American football player (1921–2010)

- Johnny Tarrant, c. 1963

Profile
- Position: Quarterback

Personal information
- Born: February 18, 1921; Birmingham, Alabama
- Died: May 17, 2010 (aged 89); Birmingham, Alabama
- Listed height: 5 ft 9 in (1.75 m)
- Listed weight: 160 lb (73 kg)

Career information
- High school: Woodlawn (AL)
- College: Howard

Career history
- Miami Seahawks (1946)
- Stats at Pro Football Reference

James Robert Tarrant Jr. (February 18, 1921 – May 17, 2010) was an American football quarterback.

Tarrant was born in Birmingham, Alabama, in 1921 and attended Woodlawn High School in that city. He played college football at Howard College of Birmingham (now known as Samford). He was selected as a Little All-American in 1940 and transferred from Howard to Tennessee in 1941. He was declared ineligible in 1942, served in the Army for three years, and never played at Tennessee.

Tarrant played professional football for the Miami Seahawks of the All-America Football Conference in 1946. He appeared in four games, one of them as the Seahawks' starting quarterback. He completed five of 12 passes for 95 yards and a touchdown. He was rated as the best passer in the team's training camp, and a specialist in the "running jump-pass", but a leg injury kept him out for much of the season. He was released by the Seahawks on October 28, 1946.

In 1948, he became the head football coach at Phillips High School and later at Banks High School, both in Birmingham. He joined the Auburn coaching staff in 1962. He served as the supervisor of Auburn's athletic dormitory. In 1963, he accepted a position as the principal of the Gibson School in Woodlawn, Alabama.

He died in 2010 in Birmingham, Alabama.
