= Pete Franceschi =

American football player (1919–1989)

No. 82
- Positions: Running back, defensive back

Personal information
- Born: September 28, 1919; San Francisco, California, U.S.
- Died: July 22, 1989 (aged 69); San Francisco, California, U.S.
- Listed height: 5 ft 9 in (1.75 m)
- Listed weight: 170 lb (77 kg)

Career information
- High school: Mission (CA)
- College: San Francisco

Career history
- San Francisco 49ers (1946); San Francisco Clippers (1947)

Career statistics
- Games played: 9
- Rush attempts: 8
- Rushing yards: -5
- Rushing touchdowns: 1
- Receptions: 3
- Receiving yards: 35
- Receiving touchdowns: 1
- Punt returns-yards: 1–6
- Stats at Pro Football Reference

Peter Louis Franceschi (September 28, 1919 – July 22, 1989) was an American football running back and defensive back who played one season for the San Francisco 49ers in 1946. He also played for the San Francisco Clippers in 1947.

In his career he had 8 rush attempts for −5 yards and a touchdown. He also had 3 receptions for 35 yards and a touchdown. With the Clippers in 1947 he scored five touchdowns.
