= Forest Hill Hotel (Pacific Grove, California) =

Historic hotel

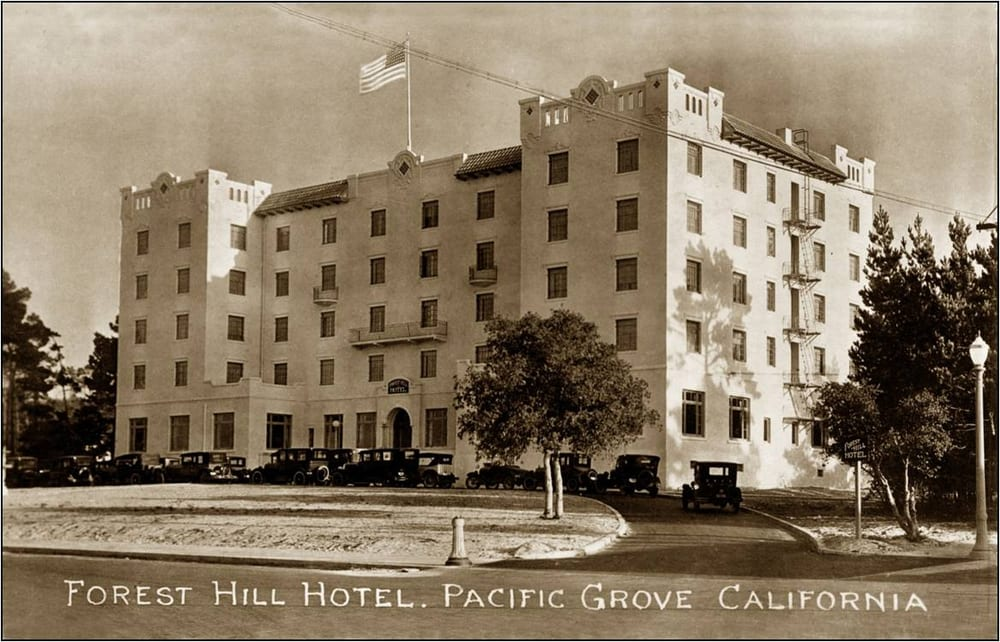
- Forest Hill Hotel (c. 1926)
- Interactive map of the Forest Hill Hotel area

General information
- Location: Pacific Grove, California, 551 Gibson Avenue and Forest Avenue
- Coordinates: 36°36′55″N 121°55′9″W
- Opening: 1926
- Operator: Aura Senior Living

Height
- Height: 77 ft (23 m)
- Architectural: Mediterranean Revival architecture

Technical details
- Floor count: 5

Design and construction
- Architect: George Rushforth
- Architecture firm: Wright and Rushforth, Architects
- Developer: Samuel S. Parsons
- Engineer: C. L. Wold Company
- Structural engineer: Victor H. Poss

Other information
- Number of rooms: 100
- Number of restaurants: 1

Forest Hill Hotel is an historic hotel in Pacific Grove, California. It was opened on July 1, 1926, and is one of the highest buildings in Pacific Grove. It is currently the Pacific Grove Senior Living.

== History ==
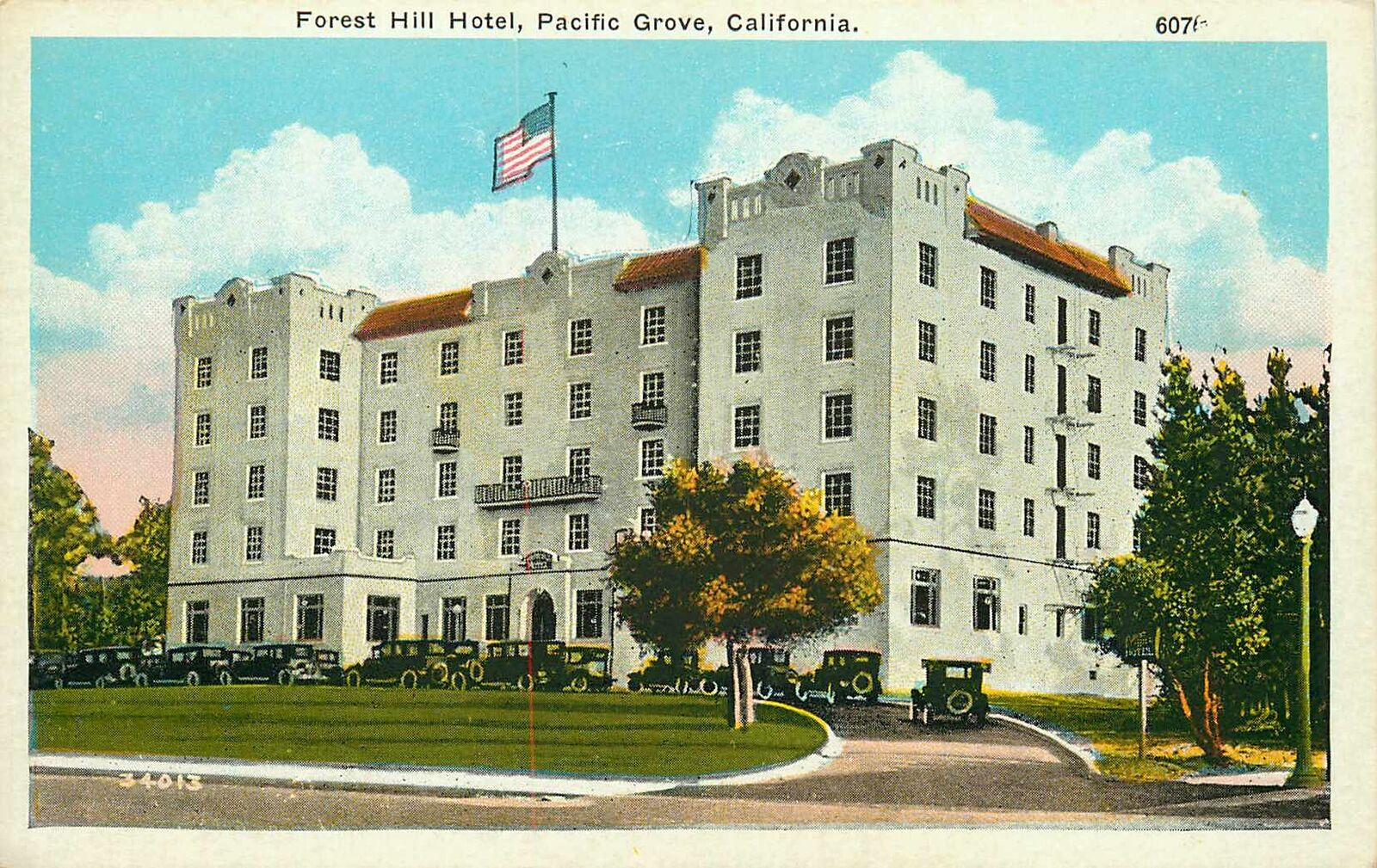
1926 Postcard of the Forest Hill Hotel

The Forest Hill Hotel at Pacific Grove, California was designed by architect George Rushforth in a simplified Mediterranean Revival-style architecture. The hotel was built for retired businessman Samuel S. Parsons for $300,000 (equivalent to $5,455,827 in 2025). The C. L. Wold Company construction company of San Francisco was the builder. It was under construction when it was unveiled on July 1, 1926. It is located on two blocks at 551 Gibson Avenue and Forest Avenue, in Pacific Grove.

The five story structure has 100-rooms, and was constructed with a foundation of reinforced concrete. The hotel lobby includes open terraces at both the front and rear, as well as public and private dining areas, a ladies' parlor, and a lounge. The public rooms are paneled with Philippine mahogany, with tile floors.

It quickly achieved a fully-booked status. There is a park and community center near the hotel; Parsons funded the building of tennis courts.

The hotel was part of the development of the area in the 1920s, at a time of rising automobile tourists as well as increased year-round residents.

When Parsons died in 1946, his widow sold the hotel in February 1947 to a consortium of investors led by Luther E. Rodgers, Abraham H. Berk, and Louis Gross.

While under the management of the Church, it operated without denominational prerequisites. Individuals interested in residing there would secure a lifelong lease, with prices ranging between $5,000 (equivalent to $59,944 in 2025) and $7,000, (equivalent to $83,922 in 2025).

== See also ==
- List of hotels in the United States
