= Andy Marefos =

American football player (1917–1996)

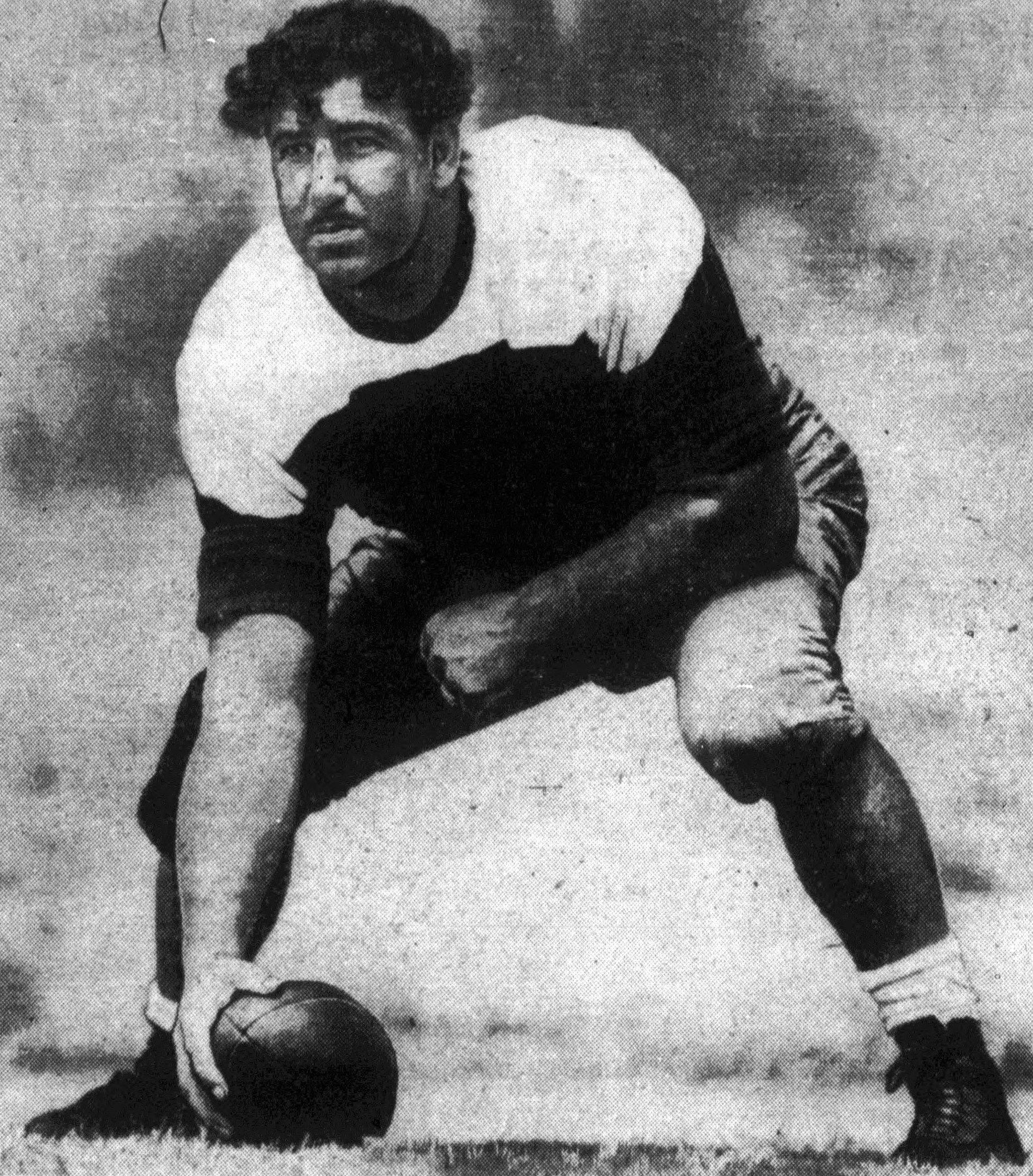
- Marefos, circa 1946

No. 70, 23, 34, 79
- Positions: Fullback, halfback

Personal information
- Born: July 16, 1917; San Francisco, California, U.S.
- Died: February 18, 1996 (aged 78); Marysville, California, U.S.
- Listed height: 6 ft 0 in (1.83 m)
- Listed weight: 223 lb (101 kg)

Career information
- High school: Mission (San Francisco)
- College: Saint Mary's
- NFL draft: 1941: 12th round, 107th overall pick

Career history
- New York Giants (1941–1942); Los Angeles Bulldogs (1943-1944); Los Angeles Dons (1946); Edmonton Eskimos (1949)

Career NFL/AAFC statistics
- Rushing yards: 384
- Rushing average: 2.8
- Rushing touchdowns: 7
- Stats at Pro Football Reference

Andy Marefos (July 16, 1917 – February 18, 1996) was an American football fullback and halfback. He played for the New York Giants from 1941 to 1942 and for the Los Angeles Dons in 1946.

He died on February 18, 1996, in Marysville, California at age 78.
