= Marion Pugh =

American football player (1919–1976)

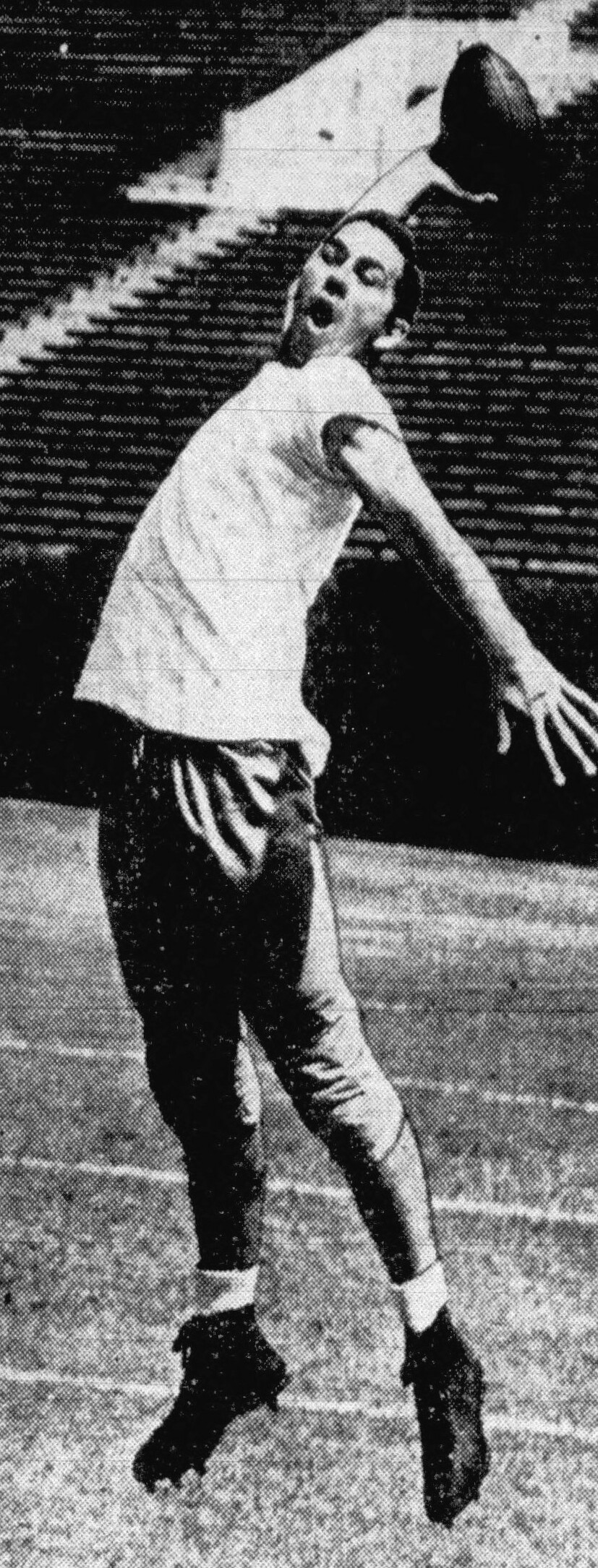
- Pugh in 1942

No. 30, 2, 67
- Position: Quarterback

Personal information
- Born: September 6, 1919; Fort Worth, Texas, U.S.
- Died: November 20, 1976 (aged 57); College Station, Texas, U.S.
- Listed height: 6 ft 1 in (1.85 m)
- Listed weight: 187 lb (85 kg)

Career information
- High school: North Side (Fort Worth)
- College: Texas A&M (1937–1940)
- NFL draft: 1941: 3rd round, 16th overall pick

Career history
- New York Giants (1941, 1945); Miami Seahawks (1946)

Awards and highlights
- National champion (1939); Second-team All-SWC (1940)

Career NFL/AAFC statistics
- Passing yards: 1,159
- TD–INT: 9–15
- Passer rating: 49.1
- Stats at Pro Football Reference

Marion Condy Pugh (September 6, 1919 – November 20, 1976) was an American professional football player who was a quarterback for two seasons with the New York Giants of the National Football League (NFL). He was selected by the Philadelphia Eagles in the third round of the 1941 NFL draft after playing college football and baseball at Texas A&M University. He was also a member of the Miami Seahawks of the All-America Football Conference (AAFC).

== Early life and college ==
Marion Condy Pugh was born on September 6, 1919, in Fort Worth, Texas. He attended North Side High School in Fort Worth.

Pugh played college football for the Texas A&M Aggies of Texas A&M University. He was on the freshman team in 1937 and was a three-year letterman from 1938 to 1940. In 1939, he completed 43 of 84 passes (51.2%) for 458 yards, two touchdowns, and ten interceptions while also rushing 46 times for 135 yards and one touchdown. The 1939 Aggies were national champions. Pugh helped the Aggies win 19 straight games from 1939 to 1940. He was named second-team All-Southwest Conference (SWC) by both the Associated Press and the United Press as a senior in 1940. Pugh also played baseball at Texas A&M, earning All-SWC honors. He graduated from college in 1941. Pugh was inducted into the Texas A&M Athletic Hall of Fame in 1971.

== Professional career ==
Pugh was selected by the Philadelphia Eagles in the third round, with the 16th overall pick, of the 1941 NFL draft. On May 23, 1941, he was traded to the New York Giants. He played in five games for the Giants during the 1941 season, completing 12 of 24 passes for 161 yards and one touchdown while also rushing 24 times for 50 yards. Pugh served in World War II for the United States Army before rejoining the Giants in 1945. He appeared in five games, starting two, for New York during the 1945 season, recording 27 completions on 58 passing attempts (46.6%) for 390 yards, three touchdowns, and three interceptions.

Pugh played in all 14 games, starting ten, for the Miami Seahawks of the All-America Football Conference (AAFC) during the league's inaugural 1946 season, completing 55 of 118 passes (46.6) for 608 yards and five touchdowns and 12 interceptions while also scoring two touchdowns and catching four passes for 43 yards.

== Personal life ==
Pugh died of a heart attack on November 20, 1976, in College Station, Texas.
