= Los Angeles Dons =

Football team of the AAFC from Los Angeles, California

Logo

General information
- Founded: 1946
- Folded: 1949
- Stadium: Los Angeles Memorial Coliseum
- Headquartered: Los Angeles, California, U.S.
- Colors: Red, White, Blue

Personnel
- Owner: Benjamin Lindheimer

League / conference affiliations
- All-America Football Conference; Western Division

The Los Angeles Dons were an American football team in the newly formed football league the All-America Football Conference (AAFC) from 1946 to 1949, and played their home games in the Los Angeles Memorial Coliseum. The Dons were the first professional football team to play a regular season game in Los Angeles, California, two weeks before the first game of the rival Los Angeles Rams of the National Football League, who had moved from Cleveland.

== Team history ==
=== Launch ===
In 1946, a new professional football league was launched to do battle with the long-established National Football League (NFL). This new league, the All-America Football Conference (AAFC), included eight teams—an Eastern Division with three teams based in the state of New York and another in Miami, and a Western Division with teams in Cleveland, Chicago, San Francisco, and Los Angeles. The AAFC's southern California franchise, which was to compete directly with the newly-relocated Rams of the NFL, was known as the Los Angeles Dons.

The leader of the ownership group was Benjamin Lindheimer, a California businessman and longtime football fan. Other owners included Hollywood notables Louis B. Mayer, Bob Hope, Bing Crosby, and actor Don Ameche.

The Dons' head coach was "Dud" DeGroot, a Stanford football player who had gone on to earn a PhD from that institution. He was the head coach of the NFL's Washington Redskins in 1944 and 1945 before jumping over to the rival AAFC for its debut 1946 season.

As with many professional football teams of the 1940s and 1950s, the Dons had their own fight song.

The Dons shared the Coliseum with the Rams for home games. Although never filling the mammoth facility, the club made a show of offering vast numbers of tickets for sale at reasonable prices, including 40,000 reserved seats for each home contest priced at $2.50, 15,000 general admission seats costing $1.50, and 8,000 children's tickets priced at just sixty cents.

The team played its first regular season home game in 1946 on against the Brooklyn Dodgers on September 13 in before a Friday night crowd of 18,955 — the first time professional football had ever been played in the Coliseum. The Dons took a first quarter lead on a 55-yard pass from quarterback "Chuckin' Charlie" O'Rourke to Bernie Nygren and never looked back, triumphing 20–14 over the visitors from New York. The Dons opened the inaugural season with three wins and a tie before a rough spell; they finished in third place in the AAFC's Western Division with a record of 7–5–2, out of the playoffs.

=== Development ===
For most of their existence, the Dons compiled an average record, and never qualified for the AAFC playoffs. This was mainly because they were in the same division as the league's two most powerful teams, the Cleveland Browns and San Francisco 49ers. Unlike the Browns, 49ers, and Baltimore Colts, the Dons were not one of the AAFC teams that remained intact when the AAFC merged with the NFL in 1950: they merged with the crosstown Rams of the older league after the 1949 season.

=== Legacy ===
One Dons player, William Radovich, formerly of the NFL's Detroit Lions, filed a lawsuit against the NFL after being blacklisted from playing or working in it afterwards. It led to the Supreme Court ruling, in the case of Radovich v. National Football League, that professional football, unlike baseball, was subject to antitrust laws.

== Pro Football Hall of Famers ==
Los Angeles Dons Hall of Famers
Players
No.	Name	Position	Tenure	Inducted
50	Len Ford	DE	1948–1949	1976

== Season-by-season ==
Season records
Season	W	L	T	Finish	Playoff results
1946	7	5	2	3rd AAFC West	--
1947	7	7	0	3rd AAFC West	--
1948	7	7	0	3rd AAFC West	--
1949	4	8	0	5th AAFC	--
Totals	25	27	2		
