= Baltimore Colts (1947–1950) =

Defunct American football team

Logo

General information
- Founded: 1947
- Folded: 1950
- Stadium: Municipal Stadium (1947–1949), Memorial Stadium (1950)
- Headquartered: Baltimore, Maryland, U.S.
- Colors: Green, silver, white

Personnel
- General manager: Jack Espey (1947); Walter Driskill (1948–1950); Al Ennis (1950)
- Head coach: Cecil Isbell (1947–49); Walter Driskill (1949); Clem Crowe (1950)

Team history
- Miami Seahawks (1946) (de facto); Baltimore Colts (1947–50)

League / conference affiliations
- All-America Football Conference (1947–1949); National Football League (1950); National Conference

The Baltimore Colts were a professional American football team based in Baltimore, Maryland. The first team to bear the name, it was a member of the All-America Football Conference (AAFC) from 1947 to 1949 and then joined the National Football League (NFL) for one season before folding. The Colts were one of the least successful teams in the AAFC and NFL both on and off the field, winning only 11 of their 54 games in their history. In 1953, Baltimore was granted an expansion team that revived the Colts name. That franchise moved in 1984 and became the Indianapolis Colts.

This Colts team's origin lies with the Miami Seahawks, one of the charter franchises of the AAFC. After playing a single disastrous season, the Seahawks were seized by the league, and were purchased and reorganized by a group of businessmen as the Baltimore Colts. The new team struggled through the next three seasons, but managed to grow a sizable fan base in Baltimore. In 1949, the Colts were one of three AAFC teams, along with the San Francisco 49ers and the Cleveland Browns, to be brought into the NFL following the AAFC–NFL merger. They played only during the 1950 season before financial pressures forced them to fold.

== History ==
=== Origins ===
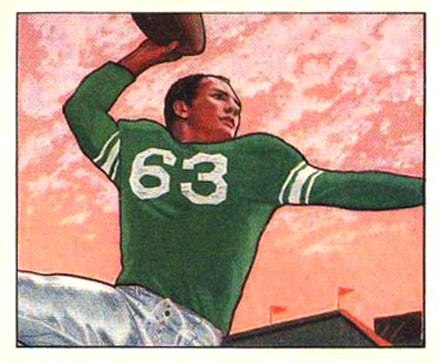
Y. A. Tittle was the Colts' quarterback from 1948 to 1950

The All-America Football Conference had initially intended to place a team in Baltimore in its opening 1946 season, but this fell through as its prospective owner, retired boxer Gene Tunney, was unable to secure a stadium deal. Needing an eighth team to avoid byes, the AAFC granted a franchise to a group of Miami-based boosters, who formed the Miami Seahawks.

The Seahawks problems included being in the second-smallest market in the NFL or AAFC (ahead of only Green Bay), while Seahawks owner Harvey Hester was the only AAFC owner who was not a millionaire. The season saw them play seven of their first eight games on the road, and combined with a very poor team, the Seahawks drew a total of 49,151 fans to their seven home games.

At the end of the season, the team was $350,000 in debt, including $80,000 in outstanding travel and payroll costs. This was well beyond Hester's ability to pay, and his boosters walked away upon realizing the extent of the debt. Hester was subsequently declared bankrupt, leaving AAFC Commissioner Jim Crowley to seize the franchise.

Five businessmen, led by Washington, D.C. attorney Robert D. Rodenburg, made a bid to purchase the Seahawks' assets and use them to start a new team in Baltimore. The AAFC quickly approved the deal, and the team was reorganized as the Baltimore Colts, a name chosen due to the city's long history of horse racing and breeding. Due to the club's inherited talent drought, the Colts were permitted to recruit a player from each of the AAFC's four strongest teams.

Nevertheless, the Colts struggled financially through the 1947 season, leading the owners to walk away after the season. The team was little better on the field, winning only two games to finish in the Eastern Division basement. Sensing a crisis, the AAFC supplied its three weakest teams (the Colts, the Chicago Rockets and the Brooklyn Dodgers) with superior players. The team found new ownership group, which consisted of 18 area businessmen led by Baltimore Bullets president R. C. Embry, but its financial crisis was not resolved. Embry stepped down as president after the season and was succeeded by general manager Walter Driskill.

Even with more talent the Colts were barely competitive on the field in 1948. However, the Eastern Division was rather poor that year; none of its four teams tallied a winning record. The Colts tied for first with the Buffalo Bills with a 7–7 record, and lost the division championship playoff to the Bills. The team then regressed in 1949, finishing last with a 1–11 record.

=== Merger ===
In 1948, both the AAFC and the NFL were struggling, and determined that the continued viability of professional football depended on a merger between the leagues. The leagues began negotiating a deal in which three AAFC teams would be brought into the NFL, and the owners of the others would be compensated for their interest. The Cleveland Browns and San Francisco 49ers, clearly the AAFC's strongest teams, were obvious choices.

It initially appeared that the Bills would be the third team in the merger. However, the Colts' owners pressed to be included in the Bills' place, even though they were one of the weakest teams in the league. George Preston Marshall, owner of the Washington Redskins, initially refused to cooperate. He considered Baltimore to be part of his home territory, and believed the Colts would infringe on his rights. However, Marshall was convinced that the Colts would be a natural rival to his Redskins, and finally relented in exchange for the Colts paying him $150,000. With this obstacle overcome, the merger was finalized, and the Colts were brought into the NFL. In order to improve the team's financial picture, ownership decided to have a businessman run the team in 1950 and selected Abraham Watner, the president of a Baltimore cemetery firm, to serve as president. Driskill remained on as the team's general manager.

Despite playing in the second-smallest market in pro football (ahead of only Green Bay) and Buffalo's notoriously harsh climate, the Bills were arguably a better choice for entry into the NFL. The Bills were in a more isolated market, had stronger attendance and performed better on the field. The newly merged league's owners scheduled a second vote to add the Bills in order to balance the schedule. However, in those days, adding a new team required a unanimous vote, and the Chicago Bears's George Halas and the Los Angeles Rams' Dan Reeves persuaded two other clubs to vote with them in blocking the merger. (The Bills were not the same team as the modern Buffalo Bills, a charter American Football League franchise which joined the NFL in 1970 as part of the AFL-NFL merger.)

The Colts were nominally part of the "National Conference" along with the other eastern teams in the merged league, but unlike the other twelve teams, Baltimore was scheduled as a "swing team" and played every team in the NFL over the course of the 1950 season; the other twelve teams played a double round robin schedule in their conference, plus one crossover game with the opposing conference and a game with Baltimore.

Despite the addition of the Bills players, the Colts struggled through the 1950 season, ending with a record of 1–11–0.

=== Dissolution ===
Facing a financial crisis, Colts president Abraham Watner sold the team and its player contracts back to the NFL for $50,000, and the team officially folded. Despite this, fan support continued in many quarters: notably, the team's marching band and fan club remained intact.

As of 2026, this is the last time the NFL has outright contracted a franchise. The following year, the New York Yanks folded, but their player contracts were acquired by the Dallas Texans, who were ostensibly a new franchise. After only one season, that team was also dissolved and its assets were purchased by another new franchise, the present-day Colts, ending Baltimore's absence from the NFL after only two seasons. Since their return to the league the Colts are considered to have begun play in 1953, and are not a continuation of the original Colts, Yanks, Texans or any other franchise.

== Season-by-season ==
Season records
Season	W	L	T	Finish	Playoff results
Baltimore Colts
1947	2	11	1	4th AAFC East	–
1948	7	7	0	2nd AAFC East	Lost Eastern Division Championship Buffalo 28, Baltimore 17
1949	1	11	0	7th AAFC	–
Merged into NFL
1950	1	11	0	7th National	–
Totals	11	40	1		

== First-round draft picks ==
Baltimore Colts first-round draft picks
Year	Player name	Position	College
1947	Elmer Madar	End	Michigan
1948	Bobby Layne	QB	Texas
1949	George Sims	Back	Baylor
1950	Adrian Burk	QB	Baylor

== Pro Football Hall of Famers ==
Baltimore Colts Hall of Famers
Players
No.	Name	Positions	Seasons	Inducted	Notes
64	George Blanda	QB	1950	1981	Played only one game
49	Art Donovan	DT	1950	1968	
63	Y. A. Tittle	QB	1950	1971	

== Radio announcers ==
Year	Station	Play-by-play	Color commentator
1950	WITH	Chuck Thompson	
1949	WITH	Chuck Thompson	Bill Dyer
1948	WITH	Ted Husing	Bill Dyer
1947	WITH	Ted Husing	Bill Dyer
