= Miami Seahawks =

Defunct American football franchise

Logo

General information
- Founded: 1946
- Folded: 1947
- Stadium: Burdine Stadium
- Headquartered: Miami, Florida, U.S.
- Colors: Orange, White, Green

Personnel
- Owner: Harvey Hester
- General manager: Jack Espey
- Head coach: Jack Meagher (games 1–6); Hamp Pool (games 7–14)

Team history
- Miami Seahawks (1946)

League / conference affiliations
- All-America Football Conference (1946); Eastern Division

The Miami Seahawks were a professional American football team based in Miami, Florida. They played in the All-America Football Conference (AAFC) in the league's inaugural season, 1946, before the team was relocated to Baltimore. They are notable as the first major league sports franchise in Miami.

The Seahawks were coached initially by Jack Meagher and then by Hamp Pool. The team faced a difficult schedule filled with many early road games, and finished the 14-game regular season at 3–11, last in the AAFC. The franchise, which by that time had accrued $350,000 in debt, was seized by the AAFC after the end of the season after its owner was declared bankrupt, and its assets were purchased by a group of entrepreneurs who reorganized it as the original incarnation of the Baltimore Colts.

Florida did not have another professional football team for 20 years, until the (fourth) American Football League (founded in 1960) added the Miami Dolphins in 1966, while the Seahawks name would be revived when the National Football League added the Seattle Seahawks in 1976 after a public vote of possible names. Neither of these teams are considered to be related to the Miami AAFC team.

== History ==
The Miami Seahawks were the last of the AAFC's charter teams to be established: originally, there was a Baltimore franchise which was to have been owned by retired boxer Gene Tunney, but Tunney's bid fell through as he was unable to secure a deal to use city-owned Municipal Stadium on 33rd Street, built in 1922 in the former Venable Park of northeast Baltimore (site of the future Memorial Stadium, rebuilt 1950–1954).

A group of Miami football boosters, led by Harvey Hester, seized on the chance to bring a major league team to their city. The AAFC, needing an eighth team to avoid byes in the schedule, readily granted Hester a franchise: the Seahawks thus became the first major league sports team to be based in Miami. Home games were played at Burdine Stadium, later called the Miami Orange Bowl.

The Seahawks stood out from the other AAFC franchises in several ways:

- Firstly, Miami was by far the smallest market in the AAFC, with roughly half the population of most other metropolitan areas with professional football teams: in fact, it was the second smallest city in the NFL and AAFC, ahead of only Green Bay (which at the time played part of its schedule in much larger Milwaukee).
- Secondly, although Miami was beginning a period of growth that continues today, it was only the 42nd-largest city in the United States at the time, while the other AAFC and NFL cities (except Green Bay) were among the fifteen largest in the United States.
- Thirdly, whereas the AAFC otherwise stood out for being backed by wealthy businessmen, Hester was substantially less wealthy than the other team owners, and was the only one among them who was not a millionaire. Cleveland Browns famed coach and owner Paul Brown remarked that Hester seemed out of his element around the other owners, to the point that he was reluctant to even play poker with them.
- Fourthly, with a capacity of about 35,000, Burdine Stadium was a relatively small stadium even by the standards of the time (it would be expanded to almost 60,000 shortly after the Seahawks' demise). At the time, teams needed to draw at least 25,000 fans per game to break even, thus Hester had little margin for error if his club was to remain solvent.
- Fifthly, the Deep South was culturally much less accepting of professionalism in sports at the time, compared to the more industrialized northeast where most U.S. professional sports teams were then based, further complicating the team's efforts to sell tickets.
- Finally, the endemic racism of the pre-civil rights era South further hampered the team's attempts to gain an audience after it became clear the AAFC would be an integrated league. In contrast, college football in the region was almost entirely segregated in this era.

The Seahawks hired Iowa Pre-Flight Seahawks coach Jack Meagher as head coach and former Washington Redskins general manager Jack Espey as GM. Their schedule was quite difficult from the beginning: they played seven of their first eight games on the road. Their first game was a harbinger of things to come, with a 44–0 thrashing at the hands of the Cleveland Browns.

By the time of their first home game, they had a record of 0–3–0, leading local papers to describe them as "woefully inept". Meagher resigned on October 22 after winning just one of his first six games, with assistant Hamp Pool, the captain of the 1940 and 1941 Chicago Bears NFL championship teams, being forced to take over as head coach.

After a 1–7–0 start, the team were in last place when they returned home to host their final six games. For the aforementioned reasons, the team would have had difficulty filling their stadium even in the best of circumstances, and in any case fans had quickly lost interest in the struggling team, and a paltry total of 49,151 fans paid to attend the Seahawks' home games: this included a miserable 2,340 against Brooklyn, the second lowest attendance at any professional football game since 1939 (excluding 2020, when the COVID-19 pandemic severely limited attendance). Further, Cleveland and San Francisco had completed their 14-game regular seasons before the Seahawks hosted their final two home games.

The team also played all of its November home games on Monday nights, the first time in major professional football that such a move had ever been attempted more than once in a year.

At the end of the season, the team was $350,000 in debt, including $80,000 in outstanding travel and payroll expenses. This was well beyond Hester's ability to pay, and to make matters worse, his boosters walked away upon realizing the extent of the debt. Other football boosters in Miami wanted to buy the team, but were unwilling to pay the substantial debt, so they wanted to wait another year to make a bid.

Before the Miami boosters could make a bid, however, Hester was declared bankrupt, leaving AAFC Commissioner Jim Crowley with no option but to seize the team. In January 1947, the AAFC approved a bid by Washington, D.C. attorney Robert D. Rodenburg and four other businessmen; the Rodenburg-led group effectively moved the team to Baltimore and rebranded it as the first incarnation of the Baltimore Colts.

The fiasco left local officials weary of upstart professional football leagues. By 1960, Miami was much more comparable in size to established major professional sports markets. Nevertheless, when the American Football League awarded Ralph Wilson a charter franchise for Miami, the city refused to grant him a lease at the Orange Bowl. Wilson eventually established his team in Buffalo, New York where they became the Buffalo Bills. However, once it became clear that the AFL was a far more viable venture, the municipal government reversed its stance. In 1965, the AFL awarded an expansion franchise to lawyer Joe Robbie and actor Danny Thomas, the Miami Dolphins, which would become a far more successful team on and off the field.

After the NFL and AFL merged, the Seahawks nickname would be revived (ironically, at the opposite geographical corner of the contiguous U.S.) when the Seattle Seahawks joined the NFL in 1976.

== 1946 schedule ==
- Fri. Sept. 6 – Miami 0 at Cleveland Browns 44
- Sun. Sept. 15 – Miami 14 at San Francisco 49ers 21
- Fri. Sept. 20 – Miami 14 at Los Angeles Dons 30
- Tue. Oct. 8 – San Francisco 49ers 34 at Miami 7
- Fri. Oct. 11 – Miami 17 at Buffalo Bisons 14
- Fri. Oct. 18 – Miami 7 at Chicago Rockets 28
- Fri. Oct. 25 – Miami 7 at Brooklyn Dodgers 30
- Sun. Nov. 3 – Miami 21 at New York Yankees 24
- Mon. Nov. 11 – Chicago Rockets 20 at Miami 7
- Mon. Nov. 18 – Buffalo Bisons 14 at Miami 21
- Mon. Nov. 25 – Los Angeles Dons 34 at Miami 21
- Tue. Dec. 3 – Cleveland Browns 34 at Miami 0
- Mon. Dec. 9 – New York Yankees 31 at Miami 0
- Fri. Dec. 13 – Brooklyn Dodgers 20 at Miami 31

Season records
Season	W	L	T	Finish	Playoff results
Miami Seahawks
1946	3	11	0	4th AAFC East	N/A
