= 1947 Cleveland Browns season =

NFL team season

- Owner: Arthur B. McBride
- Head coach: Paul Brown
- Home stadium: Cleveland Stadium

Results
- Record: 12–1–1
- Division place: 1st AAFC Western
- Playoffs: Won AAFC Championship (at Yankees) 14–3
- All-Pros: Otto Graham; Mac Speedie

The 1947 Cleveland Browns season was the team's second in the All-America Football Conference (AAFC). Led by head coach Paul Brown, Cleveland finished with a 12–1–1 record, winning the Western division and the AAFC championship for the second straight year. As in 1946, quarterback Otto Graham led an offensive attack that featured fullback Marion Motley, ends Dante Lavelli, and Mac Speedie.

After a number of coaching changes and roster moves in the offseason, including signing punter Horace Gillom and fullback Tony Adamle, the Browns began with a 30–14 win over the Buffalo Bills, the first of five consecutive victories. The team lost its only game of the season to the Los Angeles Dons in October. Five more wins followed before a come-from-behind tie in November with the New York Yankees, the team Cleveland defeated in the 1946 AAFC championship. The Browns won their last two games, including a 42–0 shutout over the Baltimore Colts in the finale, to set up a championship game rematch with the Yankees in December. Cleveland beat the Yankees 14–3 in New York on an icy field to win its second championship in a row.

Graham was named the AAFC's most valuable player after leading the league in passing yards, with 2,753, and passing touchdowns, with 25. Speedie led the league in receiving, and several other Cleveland players were named to sportswriters' All-Pro lists. Brown was named the league's coach of the year by Pro Football Illustrated. The Browns played all their home games in Cleveland Stadium, attracting an average crowd of 55,848, the best home attendance record in both the AAFC and the competing National Football League (NFL).

== Offseason and roster moves ==
Cleveland finished with a 12–2 regular-season record and won the All-America Football Conference (AAFC) championship in 1946, the league's first year of play. Despite the team's strength, however, head coach Paul Brown made a number of roster moves before the beginning of 1947. He signed Tony Adamle, a fullback and linebacker who joined the team even though he had two years of college eligibility left at Ohio State University, and guard Bob Gaudio, another Ohio State player. Guard Weldon Humble, who Brown recruited out of Rice University in Texas, also joined the team.

In the Browns' biggest trade of the offseason, Brown sent end John Harrington to the Chicago Rockets for Bill Boedeker, a halfback. Perhaps the most significant signing, however, was punter Horace Gillom, who had played for Brown at Massillon Washington High School and who Brown had recruited to Ohio State before World War II. Gillom could kick the ball further than most punters of his era. He changed the way teams approached punting by lining up 15 yards behind the center instead of the customary 10 yards to give himself more space and time to make his kicks. Gillom was also the third black player to sign with the Browns at a time when many teams did not employ African-Americans. Cleveland chose fullback Dick Hoerner in the 1947 AAFC draft, but he signed instead with the Los Angeles Rams of the National Football League.

The Browns also made a number of changes to the coaching staff before the season. Bob Voigts, the tackles coach in 1946, left to become head football coach at Northwestern University. Bill Edwards, a former schoolmate of Brown's at Massillon, was hired to replace him. Red Conkright, the end and center coach in 1946, left for an assistant coaching job with the Buffalo Bills; he was replaced by Dick Gallagher. Creighton Miller, meanwhile, who had served as a backfield coach, left the Browns staff to get a law degree.

== Roster and coaching staff ==
1947 Cleveland Browns roster
Backs: 66 Ermal Allen RB/QB/CB; 99 Bill Boedeker RB/CB; 92 Tommy Colella RB/CB; 80 Bob Cowan RB/CB; 70 Spiro Dellerba FB/LB; 94 Jim Dewar RB/CB; 60 Otto Graham QB/S; 85 Don Greenwood RB/CB; 90 Edgar Jones RB/CB; 62 Cliff Lewis CB/QB; 82 Bill Lund RB/CB; 86 Lew Mayne RB; 76 Marion Motley FB/MLB; 84 Ray Terrell RB/CB; Ends/Receivers: 59 Horace Gillom P; 56 Dante Lavelli; 58 Mac Speedie; 50 John Yonakor; 52 George Young	Linemen/Linebackers: 74 Tony Adamle OLB/FB; 42 Chet Adams DT/T/K; 48 Ernie Blandin DT/T; 22 Frank Gatski C/LB; 34 Bob Gaudio G; 46 Lou Groza T/K; 32 Lin Houston G/DG; 38 Weldon Humble G/DG; 24 Mel Maceau C/LB; 45 Roman Piskor T/DT; 44 Lou Rymkus T/DT; 72 Lou Saban OLB/C/K; 20 Mike Scarry C/LB; 49 Lenny Simonetti DT/T; 36 Ed Ulinski DG/G; 30 Bill Willis DG/G	Head Coach: Paul Brown; Assistants: John Brickels (Backfield); Blanton Collier (Backfield); Bill Edwards (Tackles); Dick Gallagher (Ends); Fritz Heisler (Guards); rookies in italics

== Preseason ==
Team	1	2	3	4	Total
Colts	0	0	0	0	0
• Browns	0	7	7	14	28

- Date: August 29
- Location: Rubber Bowl, Akron, Ohio
- Game attendance: 33,106
- Source: Cleveland Plain Dealer

Scoring summary
2	CLE	Mac Speedie 25-yard pass from Otto Graham	CLE 7–0
3	CLE	Dante Lavelli 36-yard pass from Otto Graham	CLE 14–0
4	CLE	Edgar Jones 2-yard rush	CLE 21–0
4	CLE	Bob Cowan 62-yard pass from Ermal Allen	CLE 28–0

Cleveland held its training camp at Bowling Green University, as it did the year before. The Browns played one preseason game in late August against the Baltimore Colts, a new AAFC team formed to replace the Miami Seahawks after the Seahawks folded. The Browns scored their first points on a drive in the second period. A 14-yard run by fullback Marion Motley set up a 25-yard touchdown throw by quarterback Otto Graham to end Mac Speedie. Cleveland scored three more touchdowns in the game, all of them following Colts passes the Browns intercepted. One of them was a pass by Graham to end Dante Lavelli in the third quarter, and another was a rush by halfback Edgar Jones. Paul Brown pulled most of the Browns' starters from the game as the team built up a three-touchdown lead. Backup end Bob Cowan scored a fourth Cleveland touchdown in the final quarter on a pass from backup quarterback Ermal Allen, and the Browns won 28–0. Following the victory, the Browns faced the Buffalo Bills in the regular-season opener at Cleveland Stadium to begin their defense of the AAFC championship.

== Regular season results ==
Week	Date	Opponent	Result	Record	Venue	Attendance	Game recap
1	September 5	Buffalo Bills	**W** 30–14	1–0	Cleveland Stadium	63,263	Recap
2	September 12	at Brooklyn Dodgers	**W** 55–7	2–0	Ebbets Field	18,876	Recap
3	September 21	Baltimore Colts	**W** 28–0	3–0	Cleveland Stadium	44,257	Recap
4	September 26	at **Chicago Rockets**	**W** 41–21	4–0	Soldier Field	18,450	Recap
5	October 5	New York Yankees	**W** 26–17	5–0	Cleveland Stadium	80,067	Recap
6	October 12	**Los Angeles Dons**	**L** 10–13	5–1	Cleveland Stadium	63,124	Recap
7	October 19	**Chicago Rockets**	**W** 31–28	6–1	Cleveland Stadium	35,266	Recap
8	October 26	at **San Francisco 49ers**	**W** 14–7	7–1	Kezar Stadium	54,483	Recap
9	November 2	at Buffalo Bills	**W** 28–7	8–1	War Memorial Stadium	43,167	Recap
10	November 9	Brooklyn Dodgers	**W** 13–12	9–1	Cleveland Stadium	30,279	Recap
11	November 16	**San Francisco 49ers**	**W** 37–14	10–1	Cleveland Stadium	76,504	Recap
12	November 23	at New York Yankees	**T** 28–28	10–1–1	Yankee Stadium	70,060	Recap
13	November 27	at **Los Angeles Dons**	**W** 27–17	11–1–1	Los Angeles Memorial Coliseum	45,009	Recap
14	December 7	at Baltimore Colts	**W** 42–0	12–1–1	Memorial Stadium	20,574	Recap
Note: Intra-division opponents are in **bold** text.

== Game summaries ==
=== Week 1: vs. Buffalo Bills ===
Team	1	2	3	4	Total
Bills	0	0	14	0	14
• Browns	13	14	0	3	30

- Date: September 5
- Location: Cleveland Stadium, Cleveland, Ohio
- Game attendance: 63,263
- Source: Pro Football Reference

Scoring summary
1	CLE	Edgar Jones 11-yard rush (kick failed)	CLE 6–0
1	CLE	Marion Motley 3-yard rush (Lou Groza kick)	CLE 13–0
2	CLE	Marion Motley 48-yard interception return (Lou Groza kick)	CLE 20–0
2	CLE	Dante Lavelli 51-yard pass from Otto Graham (Lou Groza kick)	CLE 27–0
3	BUF	Lou Tomasetti 3-yard rush (Steve Juzwik kick)	CLE 27–7
3	BUF	Al Coppage 3-yard pass from George Ratterman (Steve Juzwik kick)	CLE 27–14
4	CLE	Lou Groza 17-yard field goal	CLE 30–14

Cleveland began the season with a 30–14 win over the Buffalo Bills. The Browns got out to a fast start, scoring two touchdowns in the first quarter and adding two more in the second while holding the Bills scoreless. Buffalo came back in the third quarter, scoring two touchdowns of its own, but Cleveland held its lead. Browns coach Paul Brown criticized the performance after the game, saying the team had failed to keep pace in the second half after he rotated in some of his younger players. "We got a good head of steam and took a commanding lead in the first half and then let down and looked bad in the last two periods," he said. Buffalo quarterback George Ratterman felt pressure from Cleveland's defense the whole game, and said the Browns were better than the Chicago Bears, who had won the 1946 NFL Championship Game the previous season. "Their line rushed me all night long and I didn't have much of a chance to get the ball away accurately," Ratterman said. "I think the Browns are much better than the Bears, especially their line." Placekicker Lou Groza had his extra point blocked after the Browns' first touchdown. It was his first missed extra point since Cleveland started play in 1946.

=== Week 2: vs. Brooklyn Dodgers ===
Team	1	2	3	4	Total
• Browns	20	0	21	14	55
Dodgers	0	7	0	0	7

- Date: September 12
- Location: Ebbets Field, Brooklyn, New York
- Game attendance: 18,876
- Source: Pro Football Reference

Scoring summary
1	CLE	Marion Motley 13-yard rush (Lou Groza kick)	CLE 7–0
1	CLE	Tommy Colella 82-yard punt return (kick failed)	CLE 13–0
1	CLE	Dante Lavelli 53-yard pass from Otto Graham (Lou Groza kick)	CLE 20–0
2	BKD	Bob Hoernschemeyer 6-yard rush (Phil Martinovich kick)	CLE 20–7
3	CLE	Marion Motley 51-yard rush (Lou Groza kick)	CLE 27–7
3	CLE	Mac Speedie 19-yard pass from Otto Graham (Lou Groza kick)	CLE 34–7
3	CLE	Bill Lund 28-yard interception return (Lou Groza kick)	CLE 41–7
4	CLE	Bill Boedeker 2-yard rush (Lou Groza kick)	CLE 48–7
4	CLE	Bill Boedeker 8-yard rush (Lou Groza kick)	CLE 55–7

Cleveland next faced the Brooklyn Dodgers, winning 55–7. The Browns scored three touchdowns in five minutes during the first quarter. Cleveland added five more touchdowns in the second half and held a comfortable lead to the end. Fullback Marion Motley ran for 111 yards on five carries and scored two touchdowns, including a 50-yard run at the beginning of the second half. Tommy Colella scored a touchdown on an 82-yard punt return, and Bill Lund ran back an interception 28 yards for another. It was in this game that the Draw play was accidentally invented when Otto Graham tripped while dropping back for a pass. As he went down, sensing blitzers about to wallop him, he stuck the ball in Motley's stomach who scampered for a sizable gain. Liking the effect, Brown added it to the playbook during halftime. By the next game the play became a staple of the offense with several versions for different situations. As Cleveland's lead increased in the second half, Brown put in second-string players. Quarterback Otto Graham was replaced by Ermal Allen, who threw for two of the Browns' touchdowns and intercepted a pass while playing on defense. Cliff Lewis, Graham's primary backup, also played in the game. Brooklyn's only score came in the second quarter on a Bob Hoernschemeyer rush. The Dodgers were hurt by short punts from Mickey Colmer and a poor passing game. The team was held to 39 yards of passing. Edgar Jones, Cleveland's primary halfback suffered an elbow injury during the game.

=== Week 3: vs. Baltimore Colts ===
Team	1	2	3	4	Total
Colts	0	0	0	0	0
• Browns	21	7	0	0	28

- Date: September 21
- Location: Cleveland Stadium, Cleveland, Ohio
- Game attendance: 44,257
- Source: Pro Football Reference

Scoring summary
1	CLE	Marion Motley 2-yard rush (Lou Groza kick)	CLE 7–0
1	CLE	Tommy Colella 23-yard interception return (Lou Groza kick)	CLE 14–0
1	CLE	Bill Boedeker 6-yard rush (Lou Groza kick)	CLE 21–0
2	CLE	Bob Cowan 1-yard rush (Lou Groza kick)	CLE 28–0

Cleveland shut out the Colts 28–0 in the third game of the regular season. The team scored three of its four touchdowns in the first quarter in a span of 12 plays. Two of those touchdowns came on runs, one by Motley and the other by Bill Boedeker; the third was a Colella interception returned for a score. The Browns' fourth touchdown, a short run by Bob Cowan, came at the end of the second quarter. Cleveland was helped by strong punting from Horace Gillom, who had a 55.7-yard average for the game, including punts of 85 and 80 yards. Graham was taken out of the game in the first half along with most of the team's first-string players. Bud Schwenk substituted at quarterback later in the game, but the team did not score in the second half. Baltimore had two opportunities to score, once reaching the Browns' four-yard line, but the Cleveland defense held. The victory made the Browns the only undefeated team in the AAFC after the San Francisco 49ers lost to the New York Yankees

=== Week 4: vs. Chicago Rockets ===
Team	1	2	3	4	Total
• Browns	10	17	0	14	41
Rockets	0	0	14	7	21

- Date: September 26
- Location: Soldier Field, Chicago
- Game attendance: 23,067
- Source: Pro Football Reference

Scoring summary
1	CLE	Lou Groza 32-yard field goal	CLE 3–0
1	CLE	Mac Speedie 70-yard pass from Otto Graham (Lou Groza kick)	CLE 10–0
2	CLE	John Yonakor 8-yard pass from Otto Graham (Lou Groza kick)	CLE 17–0
2	CLE	Bob Cowan 3-yard rush (Lou Groza kick)	CLE 24–0
2	CLE	Lou Groza 20-yard field goal	CLE 27–0
3	CHR	Frank Quillen 23-yard pass from Sam Vacanti (John Rokisky kick)	CLE 27–7
3	CHR	Bob Dove 14-yard pass from Sam Vacanti (John Rokisky kick)	CLE 27–14
4	CLE	Bill Boedeker 14-yard rush (Lou Groza kick)	CLE 34–14
4	CLE	Spiro Dellerba 10-yard fumble return (Lou Groza kick)	CLE 41–14
4	CHR	Bill Bass 22-yard pass from Sam Vacanti (John Rokisky kick)	CLE 41–21

Cleveland beat the Chicago Rockets 41–21 at Chicago's Soldier Field to extend the team's winning streak to four games. The Browns scored a touchdown in the first quarter and two more in the second. The team led 27–0 at the half. Chicago, however, started to come back in the third quarter after Cleveland coach Paul Brown took out most of his first-string players. Graham, Colella, Lew Mayne and Ed Ulinski sat out most of the game. Chicago quarterback Sam Vacanti threw three touchdown passes in the second half to give the Rockets 21 points, but a score by Cleveland's Boedeker and a fumble return for a touchdown by Spiro Dellerba kept the game out of reach. The Rockets' Bill Kellagher intercepted one of Graham's passes in the first quarter, ending Graham's streak of 91 straight pass attempts without an interception, a professional football record at the time. Chicago had the best passing performance against the Browns of any team the Browns had faced in 1947 as Vacanti threw for 195 yards on 11 completions. Groza kicked through two field goals and five extra points in the game, putting him in third place in scoring in the AAFC behind Motley and New York's Spec Sanders. Motley suffered a head injury during a pileup in the second quarter and was taken to the locker room.

=== Week 5: vs. New York Yankees ===
Team	1	2	3	4	Total
Yankees	3	0	14	0	17
• Browns	0	17	6	3	26

- Date: October 5
- Location: Cleveland Stadium, Cleveland, Ohio
- Game attendance: 80,067
- Source: Pro Football Reference

Scoring summary
1	NYY	Harvey Johnson 47-yard field goal	NYY 3–0
2	CLE	Bob Cowan 42-yard pass from Otto Graham (Lou Groza kick)	CLE 7–3
2	CLE	Tommy Colella 28-yard rush (Lou Groza kick)	CLE 14–3
2	CLE	Lou Groza 25-yard field goal	CLE 17–3
3	NYY	Lloyd Cheatham 7-yard pass from Spec Sanders (Harvey Johnson kick)	CLE 17–10
3	NYY	Bob Sweiger 20-yard interception return (Harvey Johnson kick)	17–17
3	CLE	Mac Speedie 10-yard pass from Otto Graham (kick failed)	CLE 23–17
4	CLE	Lou Groza 43-yard field goal	CLE 26–17

Cleveland next faced the Yankees at home in a rematch of the previous year's title game. The crowd of 80,067 was the second-largest in professional football history at the time. More people were turned away at the gates because Cleveland Stadium was filled to capacity. New York scored first in the first quarter on a 47-yard field goal by Harvey Johnson, but Cleveland came back in the second quarter, putting up 17 points to lead 17–3 at halftime. New York came back and tied the game 17–17 in the third quarter. Graham responded with a touchdown throw to Speedie in the third quarter. The Yankees threatened a comeback in the final minutes when Lou Sossamon blocked a Groza field goal try and New York recovered, advancing the ball to Cleveland's 25-yard line. Cleveland, however, took over on downs and ran down the clock to three minutes with a series of running plays, reaching New York's 35-yard line. Groza then attempted a field goal that fell short, but the Yankees were called offside, and Groza successfully booted his next try through, giving Cleveland a 26–17 victory. The Browns had 14 first downs to New York's 11 and rushed for 212 yards, compared to 111 for the Yankees. Graham had 11 completions for 161 passing yards despite being sacked five times for 72 yards of losses.

=== Week 6: vs. Los Angeles Dons ===
Team	1	2	3	4	Total
• Dons	0	7	3	3	13
Browns	10	0	0	0	10

- Date: October 12
- Location: Cleveland Stadium, Cleveland, Ohio
- Game attendance: 63,124
- Source: Pro Football Reference

Scoring summary
1	CLE	Lou Groza 28-yard field goal	CLE 3–0
1	CLE	Marion Motley 14-yard rush (Lou Groza kick)	CLE 10–0
2	LAD	Chuck Fenenbock 28-yard fumble return (Ben Agajanian kick)	CLE 10–7
3	LAD	Ben Agajanian 46-yard field goal	10–10
4	LAD	Ben Agajanian 17-yard field goal	LAD 13–10

Cleveland lost its first game of the season to the Dons, 13–10. The Browns opened the scoring with a Groza field goal in the first quarter followed by a touchdown run from Motley, his sixth of the season, to go up 10–0. Los Angeles, however, scored a touchdown in the second quarter to come within three points of the Browns. Dons kicker Ben Agajanian then kicked field goals in the third and fourth quarters to win the game. The final field goal came in the closing seconds of the game after the Dons reached the Browns' 28-yard line. Agajanian missed on his first attempt, but Cleveland were penalized five yards for having 12 men on the field. Agajanian made his second attempt, giving Los Angeles the victory. Cleveland was hurt by three fumbles that set up scores, including the winning field goal. Lavelli suffered bruises to his ribs during the game, and center Mike Scarry had an ankle injury. The loss put the Browns in a virtual tie with the 49ers at 5–1 – the 49ers had the same record, but with an additional tie.

=== Week 7: vs. Chicago Rockets ===
Team	1	2	3	4	Total
Rockets	0	7	0	21	28
• Browns	3	7	7	14	31

- Date: October 19
- Location: Cleveland Stadium, Cleveland, Ohio
- Game attendance: 35,266
- Source: Pro Football Reference

Scoring summary
1	CLE	Lou Groza 21-yard field goal	CLE 3–0
2	CHR	Elroy Hirsch 37-yard pass from Sam Vacanti (John Rokisky kick)	CHR 7–3
2	CLE	Marion Motley 22-yard rush (Lou Groza kick)	CLE 10–7
3	CLE	Mac Speedie 49-yard pass from Otto Graham (Lou Groza kick)	CLE 17–7
4	CLE	Edgar Jones 2-yard rush (Lou Groza kick)	CLE 24–7
4	CHR	Ray Ramsey 11-yard rush (John Rokisky kick)	CLE 24–14
4	CLE	Edgar Jones 3-yard rush (Lou Groza kick)	CLE 31–14
4	CHR	Ray Ramsey 7-yard pass from Sam Vacanti (John Rokisky kick)	CLE 31–21
4	CHR	Ray Ramsey 20-yard pass from Sam Vacanti (John Rokisky kick)	CLE 31–28

Cleveland rebounded from its first loss of the season with a 31–28 victory over the Rockets. The game started slow; Groza's 21-yard field goal was the only score in the first quarter. The Rockets then went ahead by scoring a touchdown on a long pass from quarterback Vacanti to end Elroy Hirsch. Cleveland, however, piled on the points as Motley ran for a touchdown in the second quarter and Speedie caught a pass from Graham in the third. Jones added two touchdown runs in the fourth quarter, giving Cleveland a 31–14 lead. Chicago almost caught up at the end of the game, scoring two touchdowns, but the Browns held on to win. Cleveland's third-string players were on the field in the closing minutes when Chicago made its final push. Rockets rookie Ray Ramsey had three touchdowns in the game. Graham had 239 passing yards on 10 completions. Speedie caught half of them, gaining 166 yards. His touchdown came after he dropped to the ground to grab a 17-yard pass from Graham. He faked a backward lateral while on the ground, which drew Chicago's defense away from him, and then got up and ran into the end zone.

=== Week 8: vs. San Francisco 49ers ===
Team	1	2	3	4	Total
• Browns	7	7	0	0	14
49ers	0	0	7	0	7

- Date: October 26
- Location: Kezar Stadium, San Francisco
- Game attendance: 54,483
- Source: Pro Football Reference

Scoring summary
1	CLE	Dante Lavelli 22-yard pass from Otto Graham (Lou Groza kick)	CLE 7–0
2	CLE	Mac Speedie 42-yard pass from Otto Graham (Lou Groza kick)	CLE 14–0
3	SFO	Norm Standlee 1-yard rush (Joe Vetrano kick)	CLE 14–7

The Browns next faced the San Francisco 49ers, one of the AAFC's stronger teams. San Francisco's record was 5–1–1; its only loss came in a close game against the Yankees, another top team. The 49ers were built around a group of players including quarterback Frankie Albert, end Alyn Beals and back Norm Standlee. The game was played in a heavy fog at Kezar Stadium before a crowd of more than 54,000 people. Cleveland received the opening kickoff, and Graham drove the team to San Francisco's 7-yard line. Jones, however, fumbled the ball and the 49ers took over. After forcing a punt, Cleveland got the ball back and scored on a pass to Lavelli set up by a Motley run and two completions to Speedie. Cleveland scored another touchdown in the second quarter on a long pass to Speedie, and the Browns were ahead by two touchdowns at the half. San Francisco came back on the first drive of the second half, which was capped by a Standlee run for a touchdown from one yard out. Cleveland came close to scoring again in the fourth quarter, but a fumble by Motley ended the drive. The Browns, however, held on to win 14–7. Speedie was the league's leading receiver by the eighth week, having surpassed Alyn Beals and Lavelli. He had 10 catches for 141 yards against San Francisco; the 10 receptions in a single game set an AAFC record.

=== Week 9: vs. Buffalo Bills ===
Team	1	2	3	4	Total
• Browns	7	7	7	7	28
Bills	0	0	0	7	7

- Date: September 12
- Location: War Memorial Stadium, Buffalo, New York
- Game attendance: 43,167
- Source: Pro Football Reference

Scoring summary
1	CLE	Edgar Jones 12-yard rush (Lou Groza kick)	CLE 7–0
2	CLE	Mac Speedie 99-yard pass from Otto Graham (Lou Groza kick)	CLE 14–0
3	CLE	Dante Lavelli 11-yard pass from Otto Graham (Lou Groza kick)	CLE 21–0
4	CLE	John Yonakor 39-yard pass from Otto Graham (Lou Groza kick)	CLE 28–0
4	BUF	Al Baldwin 11-yard pass from George Ratterman (Graham Armstrong kick)	CLE 28–7

A crowd of 43,167 people was on hand to watch the Browns play the Bills, Buffalo's biggest-ever home attendance figure. Cleveland scored a touchdown in each of the game's four quarters, winning 28–7. The first score followed several completions by Graham that set up a 12-yard touchdown run by Jones. In the second period, Cleveland tied a professional football record when Graham, pinned at his own one-yard line, threw a screen pass to Speedie. Speedie caught the ball and ran for a 99-yard touchdown, setting an AAFC record and tying the National Football League record for longest completed pass. The Browns scored again in the third quarter on a diving catch by Lavelli, who rolled into the end zone, and in the fourth quarter on a pass to John Yonakor. Buffalo scored its only points in the fourth period when George Ratterman connected with Al Baldwin for the quarterback's 16th touchdown of the season. Graham threw 13 completions for 246 yards as passing accounted for most of the team's 392 yards of total offense. Cleveland's defense was also strong, preventing the Bills from scoring on several drives that ventured deep into Browns territory. The win was the eighth for Cleveland in nine games and preserved its spot at the top of the AAFC standings.

=== Week 10: vs. Brooklyn Dodgers ===
Team	1	2	3	4	Total
Dodgers	6	0	0	6	12
• Browns	7	6	0	0	13

- Date: November 9
- Location: Cleveland Stadium, Cleveland, Ohio
- Game attendance: 30,279
- Source: Pro Football Reference

Scoring summary
1	BKD	Mickey Colmer 4-yard rush (kick failed)	BKD 6–0
1	CLE	Dante Lavelli 72-yard pass from Otto Graham (Lou Groza kick)	CLE 7–6
2	CLE	Lew Mayne 15-yard pass from Otto Graham (kick failed)	CLE 13–6
4	BKD	Monk Gafford 79-yard rush (kick failed)	CLE 13–12

The Browns were expected to win their November 9 game against the Brooklyn Dodgers by a wide margin; the Dodgers had just one win, and the Browns scored eight touchdowns when the teams played in September. The Dodgers, however, drove 80 yards on their first possession for a touchdown. Placekicker Phil Martinovich missed the extra point. Cleveland responded as Graham passed to Lavelli for a 72-yard touchdown on the second play from scrimmage on its ensuing possession. Groza kicked through the extra point to give the Browns a 7–6 lead. Cleveland scored again on its next possession, this time a 15-yard pass from Graham to Lew Mayne. After the second touchdown, Graham threw two interceptions and the Browns did not advance the ball past the Brooklyn 42-yard line. The Dodgers, meanwhile, threatened to score numerous times, advancing deep into Cleveland territory. One Brooklyn touchdown by Bob Hoernschemeyer was called back because of a holding penalty. Martinovich contributed to the frustration by missing four field goal tries. He also missed the extra point when the Dodgers did score in the fourth quarter on a long Monk Gafford rush. The Dodgers' missteps gave the Browns a 13–12 victory, extending their lead over the 49ers for the best record in the AAFC after San Francisco lost to the Yankees.

=== Week 11: vs. San Francisco 49ers ===
Team	1	2	3	4	Total
49ers	0	7	0	7	14
• Browns	9	7	14	7	37

- Date: November 16
- Location: Cleveland Stadium, Cleveland, Ohio
- Game attendance: 76,504
- Source: Pro Football Reference

Scoring summary
1	CLE	Chet Adams 44-yard field goal	CLE 3–0
1	CLE	Dante Lavelli 23-yard pass from Otto Graham (kick failed)	CLE 9–0
2	SFO	Len Eshmont 8-yard pass from Frankie Albert (Joe Vetrano kick)	CLE 9–7
2	CLE	Dante Lavelli 15-yard pass from Otto Graham (Chet Adams kick)	CLE 16–7
3	CLE	Otto Graham 1-yard rush (Lou Saban kick)	CLE 23–7
3	CLE	Dante Lavelli 64-yard pass from Otto Graham (Lou Saban kick)	CLE 30–7
4	SFO	Johnny Strzykalski 5-yard rush (Joe Vetrano kick)	CLE 30–14
4	CLE	Tony Adamle 1-yard rush (Lou Saban kick)	CLE 37–14

Cleveland next faced San Francisco at home, winning 37–14 before one of the biggest crowds of the season. Chet Adams opened the scoring for the Browns with a 44-yard field goal; he and Lou Saban shared kicking duties in the game after Groza pulled his leg muscle during pre-game warmups. On the ensuing possession, Albert had the ball stripped by Cleveland's Weldon Humble, and the Browns took over and scored their first touchdown on a Graham pass to Lavelli. San Francisco scored a touchdown near the beginning of the second quarter, but Cleveland dominated the scoring thereafter. Lavelli caught seven passes for a total of three touchdowns, setting an AAFC single-game record. Graham also rushed for a one-yard touchdown and threw for 222 yards. His touchdown passes made him the league leader in that category, with 18 on the season. It was the biggest margin of victory the Browns had ever recorded against the 49ers. Cleveland was helped by an adjustment Paul Brown made in his receivers' routes; the coach had Lavelli and Speedie run toward the middle of the field instead of trying to get open near the sidelines, as they had done in past games. The victory clinched the AAFC's western division for the Browns and assured the team a spot in the championship game.

=== Week 12: vs. New York Yankees ===
Team	1	2	3	4	Total
Browns	0	7	14	7	28
Yankees	14	14	0	0	28

- Date: November 23
- Location: Yankee Stadium, New York City
- Game attendance: 70,060
- Source: Pro Football Reference

Scoring summary
1	NYY	Spec Sanders 1-yard rush (Harvey Johnson kick)	NYY 7–0
1	NYY	Spec Sanders 3-yard rush (Harvey Johnson kick)	NYY 14–0
2	NYY	Spec Sanders 27-yard rush (Harvey Johnson kick)	NYY 21–0
2	NYY	Buddy Young 5-yard rush (Harvey Johnson kick)	NYY 28–0
2	CLE	Bill Boedeker 34-yard pass from Otto Graham (Lou Saban kick)	NYY 28–7
3	CLE	Marion Motley 12-yard pass from Otto Graham (Lou Saban kick)	NYY 28–14
3	CLE	Marion Motley 10-yard rush (Lou Saban kick)	NYY 28–21
4	CLE	Jim Dewar 5-yard rush (Lou Saban kick)	28–28

Cleveland's next game was against the Yankees, who had the best record in the AAFC's eastern division and were a likely opponent in the championship game. New York took an early lead as Spec Sanders scored two rushing touchdowns in the first quarter and added a third in the second. Sanders, called "Spectacular Spec" by New York sportswriters, was having a career season. By the end of the year, he had compiled 1,432 rushing yards and 1,442 passing yards; his 18 touchdowns set a professional football record that was not surpassed until the 1960s. After Sanders' three touchdowns, New York's Buddy Young added a fourth in the second quarter, widening the Yankees' lead to 28–0. Cleveland's Bill Boedeker scored a touchdown on a pass from Graham at the end of the period, but the game appeared out of reach for Cleveland at the half. The Browns, however, came back in the second half. Motley rushed for two touchdowns in the third quarter and Jim Dewar ran for a score in the fourth. The game ended in a tie. At halftime, Yankees players had hurled insults at the Browns. "They got us upset, got us angry," Graham later said. "Finally we got mad as a team and we said, 'We'll show these guys,' and we started playing football." More than 70,000 fans came to watch the game, a record for a New York pro football game that stood until 1958. Attendance was boosted by the presence of about 25,000 black fans who came in part to watch the four black players in the game: Buddy Young of the Yankees and Motley, Bill Willis and Horace Gillom of the Browns. Groza was injured during the game and was not able to play.

=== Week 13: vs. Los Angeles Dons ===
Team	1	2	3	4	Total
• Browns	7	7	6	7	27
Dons	10	0	0	7	17

- Date: November 27
- Location: Los Angeles Memorial Coliseum, Los Angeles
- Game attendance: 45,009
- Source: Pro Football Reference

Scoring summary
1	LAD	Ben Agajanian 43-yard field goal	LAD 3–0
1	LAD	Harry Clarke 8-yard interception return (Ben Agajanian kick)	LAD 10–0
1	CLE	Marion Motley 43-yard rush (Lou Saban kick)	LAD 10–7
2	CLE	Tommy Colella 18-yard pass from Otto Graham (Lou Saban kick)	CLE 14–10
3	CLE	Lew Mayne 69-yard pass from Otto Graham (kick failed)	CLE 20–10
4	LAD	Chuck Fenenbock 35-yard pass from Glenn Dobbs (Ben Agajanian kick)	CLE 20–17
4	CLE	Mac Speedie 8-yard fumble return (Lou Saban kick)	CLE 27–17

Cleveland next faced the Dons in Los Angeles. The Dons, who had handed the Browns their only loss of the season in October, scored a field goal and touchdown in the first quarter. The Browns responded with a touchdown run from Motley later in the quarter and led by four points at halftime after Tommy Colella caught a pass from Graham for another touchdown in the second period. Cleveland built on the lead in the third quarter with a long touchdown pass to Lew Mayne. Speedie sealed the victory for the Browns when he intercepted a backward lateral pass by Dons quarterback Chuck Fenenbock and ran it back 12 yards for a touchdown with four minutes left in the game. Los Angeles threatened to score numerous times, but Cleveland's defense held. The Browns forced the Dons to punt three times from within their own 10-yard line. Graham had 240 yards of passing. His two touchdown passes added to his league-leading total of 22 on the season. Tackle Lou Saban continued to handle placekicking duties for the Browns as Groza sat out with an injury.

=== Week 14: vs. Baltimore Colts ===
Team	1	2	3	4	Total
• Browns	14	7	14	7	42
Colts	0	0	0	0	0

- Date: December 7
- Location: Memorial Stadium, Baltimore
- Game attendance: 20,574
- Source: Pro Football Reference

Scoring summary
1	CLE	Edgar Jones 11-yard pass from Otto Graham (Lou Groza kick)	CLE 7–0
1	CLE	Dante Lavelli 8-yard pass from Otto Graham (Lou Groza kick)	CLE 14–0
2	CLE	Edgar Jones 1-yard rush (Lou Groza kick)	CLE 21–0
3	CLE	Lew Mayne 36-yard pass from Otto Graham (Lou Groza kick)	CLE 28–0
3	CLE	Bill Lund 18-yard pass from Cliff Lewis (Lou Groza kick)	CLE 35–0
4	CLE	Bill Lund 63-yard rush (Lou Groza kick)	CLE 42–0

Cleveland's final regular-season game was a shutout victory over the Baltimore Colts. The Browns amassed 559 passing and rushing yards against the Colts, winning 42–0 and ending the season with a 12–1–1 record. Graham threw for three touchdowns, boosting his season total to 25, and raised his total passing yards to 2,752. Backup quarterback Cliff Lewis threw another touchdown in the third quarter as Graham and most of the other starters were pulled from the game. Groza returned to the lineup after sitting out several weeks because of an injury. He kicked all four of the Browns' extra points and played a bigger role than usual as an offensive and defensive tackle because of an injury to Ernie Blandin in the second quarter. Cleveland's defense held Baltimore to 186 yards of total offense. The Yankees beat the Bills 35–13 the same week as Sanders scored three touchdowns. New York ended with an 11–2–1 record, winning the eastern division and a spot in the championship game against the Browns.

== Final standings ==
AAFC Western Division
	W	L	T	PCT	DIV	PF	PA	STK
Cleveland Browns	12	1	1	.923	5–1	410	185	W2
San Francisco 49ers	8	4	2	.667	4–2	327	264	T1
Los Angeles Dons	7	7	0	.500	3–3	328	256	W1
Chicago Rockets	1	13	0	.071	0–6	263	425	L3

Note: Tie games were not officially counted in the standings.

== AAFC championship game ==
Team	1	2	3	4	Total
• Browns	7	0	7	0	14
Yankees	0	3	0	0	3

- Date: December 14
- Location: Yankee Stadium, New York City
- Game attendance: 61,879
- Source: Pro Football Reference

Scoring summary
1	CLE	Otto Graham 1-yard rush (Lou Groza kick)	CLE 7–0
2	NYY	Harvey Johnson 12-yard field goal	CLE 7–3
3	CLE	Edgar Jones 4-yard rush (Lou Saban kick)	CLE 14–3

For the second year in a row, the Cleveland Browns and the New York Yankees faced off in the AAFC championship game, this time on a cold December day at Yankee Stadium. The crowd of 61,879 was the largest ever to watch a professional football championship game. The Browns and Yankees had played to a 28–28 tie the previous month, but the championship game did not feature much scoring because of an icy field. The Browns scored a touchdown in the first quarter on a short run by Graham set up by a 51-yard run up the middle of the field by Motley. New York scored a field goal in the second quarter, but Jones ran for another touchdown in the third, and the Browns won 14–3. The slippery field made longer passes dangerous, and Graham instead relied on shorter routes, ending the game with 14 completions and 112 passing yards. Motley was a key performer for the Browns, running for 109 yards on 13 carries, including his touchdown. The Browns' defense, meanwhile, kept Spec Sanders and New York's offense in check. New York had just 13 first downs in the game and 212 total yards. A stop by the defense in the second quarter as the Yankees reached the Browns' five-yard line forced New York to kick its lone field goal. Tommy Colella added an interception in the third quarter to stop another New York drive. Sanders had just 40 yards of rushing on 12 attempts and 89 yards of passing. Gillom's booming punts – his five kicks averaged 45 yards – also helped the Browns stop New York's dangerous return game. The Yankees had a 4.7-yard punt return average.

== Season leaders and awards ==
Graham led the AAFC in passing and was voted the league's most valuable player. Pro Football Illustrated named Brown the AAFC coach of the year. Speedie and Lavelli were the AAFC's top two receivers in receptions and receiving yards. Colella tied for the AAFC lead with six interceptions on the year. Motley was the AAFC's third-leading rusher, with 889 yards, and Gillom came in second in punting average, with 44.6 yards. Speedie, Lou Rymkus, Graham and Motley were chosen unanimously by sportswriters for an all-AAFC team. Lavelli and Bill Willis were also selected by some of the writers. Graham and Speedie were named first-team selections when the Associated Press put together a combined AAFC and NFL All-Pro list.

Cleveland's success drew large crowds both at home and away in 1947. The team's average home attendance was 55,848 people during the season, slightly lower than in 1946 but still the best in either the AAFC or NFL. Including away games, a total of 666,017 people saw the Browns play, a professional football record. Although the team was a major success on the field, the following season was even better for Cleveland. The team won all of its games in 1948 and a third straight AAFC championship.

== Bibliography ==
- Piascik, Andy (2007). The Best Show in Football: The 1946–1955 Cleveland Browns. Lanham, MD: Taylor Trade Publishing. ISBN 978-1-58979-571-6.
- Graham, Duey (2004). OttoMatic. Wayne, MI: Immortal Investments Publishing. ISBN 0-9723637-4-2.
- Knight, Jonathan (2013). The Browns Bible: The Complete Game-by-Game History of the Cleveland Browns. Kent, OH: Black Squirrel Books.
