= Cleveland Browns all-time roster (A–J) =

1,649 players have appeared in at least one regular season or postseason game in the National Football League (NFL) or All-America Football Conference (AAFC) for the Cleveland Browns since 1946. This list includes those whose last names fall between "A" and "J". For the rest, see Cleveland Browns all-time roster (K–Z). This list is accurate through the end of the 2025 NFL season.

== A ==
- Karim Abdul-Jabbar
- Rahim Abdullah
- Bobby Abrams
- Tony Adamle
- Chet Adams
- Keith Adams
- Matthew Adams
- Mike Adams
- Pete Adams
- Stefon Adams
- Vashone Adams
- Willis Adams
- Alex Agase
- Ray Agnew III
- Sam Aiken
- Al Akins
- Chris Akins
- Jordan Akins
- Allen Aldridge
- Derrick Alexander (born 1971)
- Derrick Alexander (born 1973)
- Dominique Alexander
- Eric Alexander
- Mario Alford
- Charles Ali
- Brian Allen
- Dakota Allen
- Ermal Allen
- Greg Allen
- Jake Allen
- Richard Alston
- Lyle Alzado
- Dick Ambrose
- Joe Amstutz
- Derek Anderson
- Preston Anderson
- Stuart Anderson
- Billy Andrews
- Joe Andruzzi
- Eli Ankou
- Chigozie Anusiem
- Quincy Armstrong
- Ray-Ray Armstrong
- Herman Arvie
- Pete Athas
- Doug Atkins
- George Atkinson III
- Josh Aubrey
- Miles Austin
- Genard Avery
- Tre Avery

== B ==
- Mike Baab
- Bob Babich
- Johnson Bademosi
- Matt Bahr
- Alvin Bailey
- Al Baker
- Edwin Baker
- Jerome Baker
- Sam Baker
- Tony Baker
- Daylen Baldwin
- Keith Baldwin
- Randy Baldwin
- Jerry Ball
- Ted Banker
- Carl Banks
- Chip Banks
- Fred Banks
- Robert Banks
- Zach Banner
- Carl Barisich
- Roy Barker
- Erich Barnes
- Rashidi Barnes
- Harlon Barnett
- Vincent Barnett
- Eppie Barney
- Gary Barnidge
- Eric Barton
- Mo Bassett
- Brenden Bates
- Michael Bates
- Jim Battle
- Tom Baugh
- Mark Bavaro
- Gary Baxter
- Walter Beach
- Autry Beamon
- Chad Beasley
- Clayton Beauford
- Odell Beckham Jr.
- Brad Bedell
- Rocky Belk
- Beau Bell
- D'Anthony Bell
- David Bell
- Mike Bell
- B. J. Bello
- Marcus Benard
- Travis Benjamin
- Kevin Bentley
- Elijah Benton
- Larry Benz
- Jarrick Bernard-Converse
- Aaron Berry
- Latin Berry
- Davone Bess
- Greg Best
- Ed Bettridge
- Tom Beutler
- E. J. Bibbs
- Leo Biedermann
- Andrew Billings
- Harold Bishop
- Joel Bitonio
- James Black
- Ernie Blandin
- Anthony Blaylock
- Orlando Bobo
- Colby Bockwoldt
- Leigh Bodden
- Briean Boddy-Calhoun
- Bill Boedeker
- Corey Bojorquez
- Leroy Bolden
- Rickey Bolden
- Ron Bolton
- Isaiah Bond
- Issac Booth
- John Borton
- Keith Bosley
- Keith Bostic
- Dwayne Bowe
- David Bowens
- R. J. Bowers
- Brant Boyer
- Harold Bradley, Jr.
- Henry Bradley
- Ja'Marcus Bradley
- Donny Brady
- Stephen Braggs
- David Brandon
- Robert Brannon
- Caleb Brantley
- Larry Braziel
- Brian Brennan
- Johnny Brewer
- Pete Brewster
- Bob Briggs
- Jowon Briggs
- Gary Brightwell
- Cookie Brinkman
- Jacoby Brissett
- Kenny Britt
- Josiah Bronson
- Clifford Brooks
- James Brooks
- Bobby Brown
- Courtney Brown
- Dean Brown
- Dee Brown
- Eddie Brown
- Evan Brown
- James Brown
- Jim Brown
- John Brown
- Ken Brown
- Lomas Brown
- Mike Brown
- Orlando Brown
- Pharaoh Brown
- Preston Brown
- Ralph Brown
- Richard Brown
- Sheldon Brown
- Stan Brown
- Terry Brown
- Thomas Brown
- Titus Brown
- Tony Brown
- Taven Bryan
- Antonio Bryant
- Armonty Bryant
- Brandin Bryant
- Desmond Bryant
- Harrison Bryant
- Mark Buben
- Charles Buchanan
- Bob Buczkowski
- George Buehler
- Rex Bumgardner
- Mike Bundra
- Jim Bundren
- James Burgess
- Marcus Burley
- Chester Burnett
- Morgan Burnett
- Rob Burnett
- Clinton Burrell
- Juston Burris
- Devin Bush Sr.
- Devin Bush Jr.
- Dave Butler
- Kelly Butler
- Rashad Butler
- Earnest Byner
- LaRon Byrd

== C ==
- Lawrence Cager
- Mike Caldwell
- Trey Caldwell
- Jamie Caleb
- Antonio Callaway
- Jordan Cameron
- Reggie Camp
- Ibraheim Campbell
- Jason Campbell
- Mark Campbell
- Milt Campbell
- Tyson Campbell
- Sal Cannella
- James Capers
- Tank Carder
- Stephen Carlson
- Joe Carollo
- Ken Carpenter
- Lew Carpenter
- Preston Carpenter
- Vince Carreker
- T. J. Carrie
- Mark Carrier
- Alex Carter
- DeAndre Carter
- Dyshod Carter
- Jermaine Carter Jr.
- Tim Carter
- Dale Carver
- Howard Cassady
- Tom Catlin
- Lowell Caylor
- Kirk Chambers
- Roger Chanoine
- Lamar Chapman
- Orson Charles
- Clifford Charlton
- George Cheroke
- Darrin Chiaverini
- Fred Childress
- Jeff Christensen
- Geron Christian
- Nick Chubb
- Brad Cieslak
- Sam Clancy
- Monte Clark
- Frank Clarke
- Leon Clarke
- Adrian Clayborn
- Raymond Clayborn
- Felipe Claybrooks
- Thomas Clayton
- Ollie Cline
- Jadeveon Clowney
- Sammie Coates
- Sherrod Coates
- Don Cockroft
- Javion Cohen
- Adrian Colbert
- Emerson Cole
- Tommy Colella
- Corey Coleman
- Cosey Coleman
- Greg Coleman
- Kenyon Coleman
- Shon Coleman
- Trevon Coley
- Stalin Colinet
- Gary Collins
- Jamie Collins
- Larry Collins
- Maliek Collins
- Shawn Collins
- Doug Colman
- Don Colo
- Britton Colquitt
- Dustin Colquitt
- Larry Conjar
- Jack Conklin
- Ted Connolly
- Frank Conover
- Bill Contz
- Brett Conway
- Damion Cook
- Johnie Cooks
- Travis Coons
- Amari Cooper
- Jonathan Cooper
- Josh Cooper
- Keith Cooper
- Xavier Cooper
- Jim Copeland
- Al Coppage
- Austin Corbett
- Malachi Corley
- Bo Cornell
- Blake Costanzo
- Vince Costello
- Fest Cotton
- Marcus Cotton
- Tim Couch
- Terry Cousin
- Tom Cousineau
- Oniel Cousins
- Bob Cowan
- Bill Cowher
- Arthur Cox
- Bryan Cox Jr.
- Steve Cox
- Neal Craig
- Reggie Craig
- Bill Craven
- Mike Crawford
- Tim Crawford
- Bobby Crespino
- Ron Crews
- Josh Cribbs
- Chris Crocker
- Isaiah Crowell
- Billy Cundiff
- Will Cureton
- Justin Currie
- Andy Cvercko

== D ==
- Bob Dahl
- Jim Daniell
- Travis Daniels
- Gary Danielson
- Karlos Dansby
- Jaelon Darden
- Thom Darden
- Barry Darrow
- Andra Davis
- André Davis
- Austin Davis
- Ben Davis
- Bruce Davis
- Carl Davis
- Demario Davis
- Hall Davis
- James Davis
- Johnny Davis
- Kaden Davis
- Mike Davis
- Oliver Davis
- Tae Davis
- Willie Davis
- Zola Davis
- Doug Dawson
- JaJuan Dawson
- Len Dawson
- Phil Dawson
- Sheldon Day
- Matthew Dayes
- James Dearth
- Joe DeLamielleure
- Tom DeLeone
- Jake Delhomme
- Spiro Dellerba
- Garrett Dellinger
- Grant Delpit
- Enoch DeMar
- Bob DeMarco
- John Demarie
- Anthony Denman
- Al Dennis
- Bob Denton
- Dick Deschaine
- Pierre Desir
- Ty Detmer
- Seth DeValve
- Jed DeVries
- Jim Dewar
- Mohamoud Diabate
- Curtis Dickey
- Doug Dieken
- Zac Diles
- Trent Dilfer
- Jayson DiManche
- Rich Dimler
- Darnell Dinkins
- Gerald Dixon
- Hanford Dixon
- James Dockery
- Gene Donaldson
- Ken Dorsey
- Nat Dorsey
- Derrick Douglas
- Spencer Drango
- Shaun Draughn
- Jim Dray
- Jeff Driskel
- Stacey Driver
- Reuben Droughns
- Brian Dudley
- Rickey Dudley
- Bill Duff
- Jim Dumont
- Jubilee Dunbar
- Brian Duncan
- Ron Duncan
- Damon Dunn
- David Dunn
- Michael Dunn
- Michael Dwumfour

== E ==
- Nick Eason
- Ron East
- Adimchinobe Echemandu
- Donnie Echols
- Chris Edmonds
- Armanti Edwards
- Braylon Edwards
- Earl Edwards
- Lavar Edwards
- Marc Edwards
- Daniel Ekuale
- Ebenezer Ekuban
- Abram Elam
- Jordan Elliott
- Ken Ellis
- Ray Ellis
- Percy Ellsworth
- Martin Emerson
- Steve Engel
- Auston English
- Paul Ernster
- Cameron Erving
- Greg Estandia
- Darius Eubanks
- Fred Evans
- Johnny Evans
- Major Everett
- Steve Everitt

== F ==
- Anthony Fabiano
- Jeff Faine
- Carl Fair
- Greg Fairchild
- Harold Fannin Jr.
- Paul Farren
- Ricky Feacher
- Gene Fekete
- Darren Fells
- Demetric Felton
- Charley Ferguson
- Vagas Ferguson
- Ross Fichtner
- Tony Fields
- Cedric Figaro
- Yamon Figurs
- Dan Fike
- Jason Fisk
- Galen Fiss
- Joe Flacco
- Don Fleming
- Tom Flick
- Judson Flint
- Anthony Florence
- Chris Floyd
- Fred Foggie
- Herman Fontenot
- Therrian Fontenot
- Dan Footman
- Drew Forbes
- Marlon Forbes
- Henry Ford
- Jerome Ford
- Len Ford
- Mike Ford
- D'Onta Foreman
- Herschel Forester
- Miller Forristall
- L. J. Fort
- Melvin Fowler
- Hank Fraley
- Coye Francies
- Jeff Francis
- Brian Franco
- Bobby Franklin
- Elvis Franks
- Jordan Franks
- Todd Franz
- Simon Fraser
- Andy Frederick
- Mike Frederick
- Bobby Freeman
- Lennie Friedman
- Hjalte Froholdt
- Derrick Frost
- Scott Frost
- Charlie Frye
- Sione Fua
- Scott Fujita
- Corey Fuller
- Brent Fullwood
- Danny Fulton
- Mike Furrey

== G ==
- Dillon Gabriel
- Taylor Gabriel
- Bob Gain
- Derrick Gainer
- Charles Gaines
- E. J. Gaines
- Michael Gaines
- Phillip Gaines
- Scott Galbraith
- Antonio Garay
- Jeff Garcia
- Jim Garcia
- Barry Gardner
- Chris Gardocki
- John Garlington
- Kelvin Garmon
- Myles Garrett
- Chris Gartner
- Thane Gash
- Frank Gatski
- Bob Gaudio
- Don Gault
- Prentice Gautt
- Benjamin Gay
- Tim George
- Jammi German
- Abe Gibron
- Damon Gibson
- Tom Gibson
- Garrett Gilbert
- Justin Gilbert
- Garrett Gilkey
- Jamie Gillan
- Horace Gillom
- Tashaun Gipson
- Bill Glass
- Chip Glass
- Tim Goad
- Chris Gocong
- Brad Goebel
- Bob Golic
- Joaquin Gonzalez
- Zane Gonzalez
- Don Goode
- B. J. Goodson
- Marquise Goodwin
- Tom Goosby
- Amon Gordon
- Josh Gordon
- Ken Gorgal
- Donald Goss
- Jeff Gossett
- Bruce Gradkowski
- Dave Graf
- Mason Graham
- Otto Graham
- Thomas Graham Jr.
- Orantes Grant
- Wes Grant
- MarQueis Gray
- Vincent Gray
- Mike Graybill
- David Grayson
- John Greco
- A. J. Green
- Boyce Green
- David Green
- Ernie Green
- Kendrick Green
- Ron Green
- Van Green
- William Green
- Don Greenwood
- Terry Greer
- Damian Gregory
- Jack Gregory
- Don Griffin
- Kris Griffin
- Robert Griffin III
- Robert Griffith
- Chubby Grigg
- Anthony Griggs
- Dan Gronkowski
- Al Gross
- Quentin Groves
- Lou Groza
- Rusty Guilbeau
- Tori Gurley
- Porter Gustin

== H ==
- Matt Haack
- Joe Haden
- Rex Hadnot
- Joe Haeg
- Eric Hagg
- Kahlef Hailassie
- Carl Hairston
- Stacey Hairston
- Darryl Haley
- Alex Hall
- Charlie Hall
- Dana Hall
- Dino Hall
- Marvin Hall
- Mike Hall Jr.
- Rannell Hall
- Alan Haller
- Derrick Ham
- Darren Hambrick
- Bobby Hamilton
- Justin Hamilton
- Michael Hamilton
- Connor Hamlett
- Blake Hance
- Cliff Hanneman
- Brian Hansen
- Chet Hanulak
- Myles Harden
- Montario Hardesty
- Duron Harmon
- Mark Harper
- Charley Harraway
- John Harrington
- Demetrius Harris
- Duriel Harris
- Marshall Harris
- Nick Harris
- Odie Harris
- Orien Harris
- Shelby Harris
- Tim Harris
- Arnold Harrison
- Desmond Harrison
- Jerome Harrison
- Ronnie Harrison
- Frank Hartley
- Garrett Hartley
- Brian Hartline
- Willie Harvey
- J.T. Hassell
- Andrew Hawkins
- Ben Hawkins
- Mike Hawkins
- Paul Hazel
- Steve Heiden
- Keith Heinrich
- Jerry Helluin
- Anthony Henry
- KJ Henry
- Hal Herring
- Gene Hickerson
- Ronnie Hickman
- Artis Hicks
- Jordan Hicks
- Rashard Higgins
- Jay Hilgenberg
- Calvin Hill
- Jim Hill
- Madre Hill
- Travis Hill
- Troy Hill
- Will Hill
- Darius Hillary
- Dontrell Hilliard
- Randy Hilliard
- Peyton Hillis
- D'Juan Hines
- Fred Hoaglin
- Leroy Hoard
- KhaDarel Hodge
- Reggie Hodges
- Kevin Hogan
- D. D. Hoggard
- Kelly Holcomb
- Steve Holden
- Warrick Holdman
- Darius Holland
- Jamie Holland
- Glen Holloway
- Daven Holly
- Earl Holmes
- Tyrone Holmes
- Pete Holohan
- Harry Holt
- Fair Hooker
- Austin Hooper
- Houston Hoover
- Dustin Hopkins
- Thomas Hopkins
- Alvin Horn
- Don Horn
- Les Horvath
- Rob Housler
- James Houston
- Jim Houston
- Lin Houston
- Sherman Howard
- Tracy Howard
- Mike Howell
- Billy Howton
- Brian Hoyer
- Chris Hubbard
- James Hudson
- Khaleke Hudson
- John Hughes
- Charley Hughlett
- Weldon Humble
- Bob Hunt
- Kareem Hunt
- Art Hunter
- Earnest Hunter
- Pete Hunter
- Adin Huntington
- Maurice Hurst Jr.
- Tom Hutchinson
- Chuck Hutchison
- Bruce Huther
- Carlos Hyde
- Henry Hynoski, Sr.

== I ==
- Germain Ifedi
- Siaki Ika
- Mark Ilgenfritz
- Darryl Ingram
- Gerald Irons
- Paul Irons
- Joe Isbell
- Travis Ivey

== J ==
- Alfred Jackson
- Bill Jackson
- Brandon Jackson
- Corey Jackson
- Deon Jackson
- D'Qwell Jackson
- Enis Jackson
- Frisman Jackson
- James Jackson
- Joe Jackson
- Lenzie Jackson
- Malik Jackson
- Michael Jackson
- Raymond Jackson
- Rich Jackson
- Robert Jackson (born 1953)
- Robert Jackson (born 1954)
- Robert Jackson (born 1993)
- Storey Jackson
- Ben Jacobs
- Dave Jacobs
- Tim Jacobs
- Jeff Jaeger
- Chick Jagade
- Jesse James
- Lynn James
- Nate James
- Tommy James
- Michael Jameson
- Andy Janovich
- Ben Jefferson
- John Jefferson
- Malik Jefferson
- Quinton Jefferson
- Al Jenkins
- Rayshawn Jenkins
- Teven Jenkins
- Chris Jennings
- Darius Jennings
- Jerry Jeudy
- Bill Johnson
- Cam Johnson
- D'Ernest Johnson
- Duke Johnson
- Eddie Johnson
- James-Michael Johnson
- John Johnson
- Josh Johnson
- Kevin Johnson (born 1976)
- Kevin Johnson (born 1992)
- Lawrence Johnson
- Lee Johnson
- Malcolm Johnson
- Mark Johnson
- Mike Johnson
- Mitch Johnson
- Pepper Johnson
- Ron Johnson
- Tre' Johnson
- Walter Johnson
- Vernon Joines
- Bobby Jones
- Dave Jones
- Dawand Jones
- Deion Jones
- Dom Jones
- Don Jones
- Dub Jones
- Edgar Jones
- George Jones
- Homer Jones
- James Jones
- Jock Jones
- Joe Jones
- Keith Jones
- Kirk Jones
- Lenoy Jones
- Marlon Jones
- Ricky Jones
- Sean Jones
- Selwyn Jones
- Tom Jones
- Tony Jones
- Henry Jordan
- Mike Jordan
- Greg Joseph
- Karl Joseph
- Quinshon Judkins
- Mike Junkin
- Joe Jurevicius
- John Jurkovic
