= 1947 AAFC draft =

General information
- Date: December 20-21, 1946
- Location: Cleveland, Ohio

Overview
- 170 total selections in 25 rounds
- League: AAFC
- First selection: Elmer Madar, E Florida Seahawks

The 1947 AAFC draft was the first collegiate draft of the All-America Football Conference (AAFC). It used an inverse order to the teams' final standings in the 1946 season. The Buffalo Bills, which had finished with the same record as the Brooklyn Dodgers, drafted second in each round, with Brooklyn drafting third.

Beginning in round 16, a type of supplemental draft was held. From rounds 16 through 25, the Cleveland Browns and New York Yankees which were the league's top two teams, did not make any selections. From rounds 21 to 25, the San Francisco 49ers and Los Angeles Dons did not receive any selections.

Although the Miami Seahawks played in the league's inaugural season, the franchise was confiscated by the AAFC prior to the draft for failure to fulfill contractual obligations. Their selections were exercised by their head coach Hampton Poole, and were listed under the name "Florida Seahawks". On December 28, its assets (including its draft choices rights) were sold to a group of entrepreneurs who founded the original Baltimore Colts.

== Special draft ==
Prior to the regular draft, 'special selections' were made. It is not known why these were not part of the regular draft or in what order they were executed. All teams had two, except the Buffalo Bills, which had four, because the Los Angeles Dons and San Francisco 49ers, each traded one of its choices to Buffalo.

= All-Star
= AAFC MVP

AAFC team	Player	Position	College
Florida Seahawks	Ernie Case	B	UCLA
Florida Seahawks	Arnold Tucker	QB	Army
Brooklyn Dodgers	Doc Blanchard	FB	Army
Brooklyn Dodgers	Gene Roberts	B	Chattanooga
Buffalo Bills	Frank Aschenbrenner	B	Northwestern
Buffalo Bills	Red Cochran	B	Wake Forest
Buffalo Bills	Bob Fenimore	B	Oklahoma A&M
Buffalo Bills	Cal Richardson	E	Tulsa
Chicago Rockets	Bernie Gallagher	T	Pennsylvania
Chicago Rockets	Johnny Lujack	QB	Notre Dame
Cleveland Browns	Dick Hoerner	B	Iowa
Cleveland Browns	Larry Rice	C	Tulane
Los Angeles Dons	Herman Wedemeyer	B	St. Mary's (CA)
New York Yankees	Charley Trippi	B	Georgia
New York Yankees	Buddy Young	B	Illinois
San Francisco 49ers	Glenn Davis	B	Army

== Player selections ==
= All-Star
= AAFC MVP

Round	Pick #	AAFC team	Player	Position	College
1	1	Florida Seahawks	Elmer Madar	E	Michigan
1	2	Buffalo Bills	Al Baldwin	E	Arkansas
1	3	Brooklyn Dodgers	Neill Armstrong	E	Oklahoma A&M
1	4	Chicago Rockets	George Sullivan	T	Notre Dame
1	5	Los Angeles Dons	Burr Baldwin	E	UCLA
1	6	San Francisco 49ers	Clyde LeForce	B	Tulsa
1	7	New York Yankees	Ben Raimondi	B	Indiana
1	8	Cleveland Browns	Bob Chappuis	B	Michigan
2	9	Florida Seahawks	Hub Bechtol	E	Texas
2	10	Buffalo Bills	Bob Davis	T	Georgia Tech
2	11	Brooklyn Dodgers	Charley Conerly	QB	Ole Miss
2	12	Chicago Rockets	Ray Manieri	B	Wake Forest
2	13	Los Angeles Dons	Jerry Shipkey	B	UCLA
2	14	San Francisco 49ers	Bob Wiese	B	Michigan
2	15	New York Yankees	Monte Moncrief	T	Texas A&M
2	16	Cleveland Browns	Gerry Cowhig	B	Notre Dame
3	17	Florida Seahawks	Tommy Mont	B	Maryland
3	18	Buffalo Bills	Ray Kuffel	E	Marquette
3	19	Brooklyn Dodgers	Fritz Barzilauskas	G	Yale
3	20	Chicago Rockets	Bob Derleth	T	Michigan
3	21	Los Angeles Dons	Lloyd Merriman	B	Stanford
3	22	San Francisco 49ers	Paul Duke	C	Georgia Tech
3	23	New York Yankees	Bill Collins	G	Texas
3	24	Cleveland Browns	Jack Carpenter	T	Michigan
4	25	Florida Seahawks	Weldon Humble	G	Rice
4	26	Buffalo Bills	Joe Andrejco	B	Fordham
4	27	Brooklyn Dodgers	Jim Wright	G	SMU
4	28	Chicago Rockets	Johnny Reagan	B	Montana
4	29	Los Angeles Dons	Cal Rossi	B	UCLA
4	30	San Francisco 49ers	Don Samuel	B	Oregon State
4	31	New York Yankees	Joe Tereshinski Sr.	E	Georgia
4	32	Cleveland Browns	Bob Cowan	B	Indiana
5	33	Florida Seahawks	Russ Deal	T	Indiana
5	34	Buffalo Bills	John Mastrangelo	G	Notre Dame
5	35	Brooklyn Dodgers	Harlan Wetz	T	Texas
5	36	Chicago Rockets	Jim Pharr	C	Auburn
5	37	Los Angeles Dons	Boyd Clement	T	Oregon State
5	38	San Francisco 49ers	Al Satterfield	T	Vanderbilt
5	39	New York Yankees	Jack Durishan	T	Pittsburgh
5	40	Cleveland Browns	Bill Griffin	T	Kentucky
6	41	Florida Seahawks	Don Malmberg	T	UCLA
6	42	Buffalo Bills	Bert Corley	C	Mississippi State
6	43	Brooklyn Dodgers	Binks Bushmiaer	B	Vanderbilt
6	44	Chicago Rockets	Bob Sandberg	B	Minnesota
6	45	Los Angeles Dons	Willie Zapalac	B	Texas A&M
6	46	San Francisco 49ers	Jack Zilly	E	Notre Dame
6	47	New York Yankees	Walt Dropo	E	Connecticut
6	48	Cleveland Browns	Jack Bush	T	Georgia
7	49	Florida Seahawks	Vic Schwall	B	Northwestern
7	50	Buffalo Bills	Ernie Knotts	G	Duke
7	51	Brooklyn Dodgers	Garland Williams	T	Georgia
7	52	Chicago Rockets	Eddie Allen	B	Pennsylvania
7	53	Los Angeles Dons	George Savitsky	T	Pennsylvania
7	54	San Francisco 49ers	Gene Knight	B	LSU
7	55	New York Yankees	Roland Nabors	C	Texas Tech
7	56	Cleveland Browns	John Rapacz	C	Oklahoma
8	57	Florida Seahawks	Howie Turner	B	North Carolina State
8	58	Buffalo Bills	Joe Watt	B	Syracuse
8	59	Brooklyn Dodgers	Jim Hefti	B	St. Lawrence
8	60	Chicago Rockets	Matt Bolger	E	Notre Dame
8	61	Los Angeles Dons	Don Paul	C	UCLA
8	62	San Francisco 49ers	Charley Malmberg	T	Rice
8	63	New York Yankees	George Strohmeyer	C	Notre Dame
8	64	Cleveland Browns	Bob Hazelhurst	B	Denver
9	65	Florida Seahawks	Frank Hubbell	E	Tennessee
9	66	Buffalo Bills	Paul Gibson	E	North Carolina State
9	67	Brooklyn Dodgers	Buddy Burris	G	Oklahoma
9	68	Chicago Rockets	Charley Eikenberg	B	Rice
9	69	Los Angeles Dons	Paul Hart	B	Delaware
9	70	San Francisco 49ers	Bob Leonetti	G	Wake Forest
9	71	New York Yankees	Ted Ossowski	T	Oregon State
9	72	Cleveland Browns	Ralph Ellsworth	B	Texas
10	73	Florida Seahawks	Gaston Bourgeois	G	Tulane
10	74	Buffalo Bills	John Maskas	T	VPI
10	75	Brooklyn Dodgers	Charles Milner	G	Duke
10	76	Chicago Rockets	Ermal Allen	QB	Kentucky
10	77	Los Angeles Dons	Walter Heap	QB	Texas
10	78	San Francisco 49ers	Frank Broyles	QB	Georgia Tech
10	79	New York Yankees	Dick Werder	G	Georgetown
10	80	Cleveland Browns	Jimmy Dewar	HB	Indiana
11	81	Florida Seahawks	Jim Brieske	C	Michigan
11	82	Buffalo Bills	Baxter Jarrell	T	North Carolina
11	83	Brooklyn Dodgers	Jim Smith	T	Colorado
11	84	Chicago Rockets	Marty Chaves	G	Oregon State
11	85	Los Angeles Dons	Mike Dimitro	G	UCLA
11	86	San Francisco 49ers	Jim Tyree	E	Oklahoma
11	87	New York Yankees	Bill Healy	G	Georgia Tech
11	88	Cleveland Browns	Bill Huber	E	Illinois
12	89	Florida Seahawks	Rudy Mobley	B	Hardin-Simmons
12	90	Buffalo Bills	Chet Lipka	T	Boston College
12	91	Brooklyn Dodgers	Marv Goodman	E	Willamette
12	92	Chicago Rockets	George Jernigan	G	Georgia
12	93	Los Angeles Dons	Bill Moore	T	Penn State
12	94	San Francisco 49ers	Ed Robnett	B	Texas Tech
12	95	New York Yankees	Ed Sikorski	B	Muhlenberg
12	96	Cleveland Browns	Mario Giannelli	G	Boston College
13	97	Florida Seahawks	Gerry Doherty	B	Delaware
13	98	Buffalo Bills	Joe Sowinski	G	Indiana
13	99	Brooklyn Dodgers	Ted Scruggs	E	Rice
13	100	Chicago Rockets	R.J. Jordan	E	Georgia Tech
13	101	Los Angeles Dons	Joe Martin	B	Cornell
13	102	San Francisco 49ers	Walt Slater	B	Tennessee
13	103	New York Yankees	Bill Miklich	B	Idaho
13	104	Cleveland Browns	Marshall Shurnas	E	Missouri
14	105	Florida Seahawks	Bill Baumgartner	E	Minnesota
14	106	Buffalo Bills	Bill Chipley	E	Washington & Lee
14	107	Brooklyn Dodgers	Reed Nilsen	C	BYU
14	108	Chicago Rockets	Bob Livingstone	B	Notre Dame
14	109	Los Angeles Dons	Gene Wilson	E	SMU
14	110	San Francisco 49ers	Earl Wheeler	C	Arkansas
14	111	New York Yankees	Chuck Elliott	T	Oregon
14	112	Cleveland Browns	Joe Signaigo	B	Notre Dame
15	113	Florida Seahawks	Jim Kekeris	T	Missouri
15	114	Buffalo Bills	Bronco Kosanovich	C	Penn State
15	115	Brooklyn Dodgers	Gus Shannon	G	Colorado
15	116	Chicago Rockets	Bill Ivy	T	Northwestern
15	117	Los Angeles Dons	Frank Muehlheuser	B	Colgate
15	118	San Francisco 49ers	Les Proctor	G	Texas
15	119	New York Yankees	Ed Grain	G	Pennsylvania
15	120	Cleveland Browns	Dean Widseth	T	Bemidji State
16	121	Florida Seahawks	John North	E	Vanderbilt
16	122	Buffalo Bills	Frank Kosikowski	E	Notre Dame
16	123	Brooklyn Dodgers	Joe Cook	B	Hardin-Simmons
16	124	Chicago Rockets	Bruno Niedziela	T	Iowa
16	125	Los Angeles Dons	Ed Cody	B	Purdue
16	126	San Francisco 49ers	Al DeRogatis	T	Duke
17	127	Florida Seahawks	Jim Canady	B	Texas
17	128	Buffalo Bills	Wash Serini	T	Kentucky
17	129	Brooklyn Dodgers	Frank Laurinaitis	G	Richmond
17	130	Chicago Rockets	Bill Mackrides	QB	Nevada
17	131	Los Angeles Dons	Bob Sullivan	B	Holy Cross
17	132	San Francisco 49ers	Earl Tullos	T	LSU
18	133	Florida Seahawks	Howie Brown	G	Indiana
18	134	Buffalo Bills	Vinnie Yablonski	B	Columbia
18	135	Brooklyn Dodgers	Ed Gustafson	C	George Washington
18	136	Chicago Rockets	Mac Wenskunas	C	Illinois
18	137	Los Angeles Dons	Lou Cullen	B	New Mexico
18	138	San Francisco 49ers	Bryant Meeks	C	South Carolina
19	139	Florida Seahawks	Johnny Sims	B	Tulane
19	140	Buffalo Bills	Charley Compton	T	Alabama
19	141	Brooklyn Dodgers	Dick Hagen	E	Washington
19	142	Chicago Rockets	Tony Graham	C	St. Mary's (Minnesota)
19	143	Los Angeles Dons	John Killilea	B	Boston College
19	144	San Francisco 49ers	Ed Royston	G	Wake Forest
20	145	Florida Seahawks	Burt VanderClute	G	Wesleyan
20	146	Buffalo Bills	Bill Swiacki	E	Columbia
20	147	Brooklyn Dodgers	Hank Foldberg	E	Army
20	148	Chicago Rockets	Russ Benda	G	Iowa
20	149	Los Angeles Dons	Plato Andros	G	Oklahoma
20	150	San Francisco 49ers	Max Bumgardner	E	Texas
21	151	Florida Seahawks	Tony Stalloni	T	Delaware
21	152	Buffalo Bills	Ham Nichols	G	Rice
21	153	Brooklyn Dodgers	Harry Furman	T	Cornell
21	154	Chicago Rockets	George Watkins	T	Texas
22	155	Florida Seahawks	Jean Lamoure	G	Fresno State
22	156	Buffalo Bills	John Furey	T	Boston College
22	157	Brooklyn Dodgers	Walt Kretz	B	Cornell
22	158	Chicago Rockets	Sammy Vacanti	B	Nebraska
23	159	Florida Seahawks	Leo Daniels	B	Texas A&M
23	160	Buffalo Bills	Don Schneider	B	Pennsylvania
23	161	Brooklyn Dodgers	John Monahan	E	Dartmouth
23	162	Chicago Rockets	Len Zenkevitch	T	Idaho
24	163	Florida Seahawks	Tex Reilly	B	Colorado
24	164	Buffalo Bills	Chan Highsmith	C	North Carolina
24	165	Brooklyn Dodgers	Bruce Bailey	B	Virginia
24	166	Chicago Rockets	Dave Day	G	Iowa
25	167	Florida Seahawks	Jim Landrigan	T	Dartmouth
25	168	Buffalo Bills	Frank Wydo	T	Cornell
25	169	Brooklyn Dodgers	Ray Evans	B	UTEP
25	170	Chicago Rockets	Bill Franks	T	Illinois
