= Jim Dewar (American football) =

American football player (1922–1989)

- Dewar in a 1947 newspaper clipping

No. 94, 84
- Position: Halfback

Personal information
- Born: June 17, 1922; Oak Park, Illinois, U.S.
- Died: June 30, 1989 (aged 67); Muncie, Indiana, U.S.
- Listed height: 6 ft 1 in (1.85 m)
- Listed weight: 190 lb (86 kg)

Career information
- High school: Oak Park and River Forest
- College: Indiana (1942, 1946)
- NFL draft: 1947: 19th round, 173rd overall pick

Career history
- Cleveland Browns (1947); Brooklyn Dodgers (1948)

Awards and highlights
- AAFC champion (1947)

Career AAFC statistics
- Rushing yards: 64
- Rushing average: 4.6
- Touchdowns: 1
- Stats at Pro Football Reference

James Alexander Dewar Jr. (June 17, 1922 – June 30, 1989) was an American football halfback who played two seasons in the All-America Football Conference (AAFC). Dewar played for the Cleveland Browns in 1947 and the Brooklyn Dodgers in 1948.

== High school and college ==
Dewar attended Indiana University, where he was a standout as a halfback on the school's football team starting as a sophomore in 1942. He ran back a punt 90 yards for a touchdown in a 53–0 victory over Butler University that year. Dewar joined the U.S. Army in 1943 during World War II and played service football at Camp Grant in Rockford, Illinois. He was selected in 1944 to play in the College All-Star Game, a now-defunct matchup between the National Football League champion and a squad composed of the country's best college players. After the war, Dewar returned for a final season at Indiana.

== Professional career ==
Dewar was selected with the 173rd pick in the 1947 NFL draft by the Los Angeles Rams. He instead joined the Cleveland Browns of the All-America Football Conference, who had selected him in the 1947 AAFC Draft along with former Indiana teammate Bob Cowan. The Browns finished the 1947 season with a 12–1–1 record and won the AAFC championship against the New York Yankees. After a year with the team, Dewar was sent to the Brooklyn Dodgers. He played one season there before leaving football.
