= Cleveland Browns all-time roster =

The Cleveland Browns all-time roster is split by name into the following two lists:

- Cleveland Browns all-time roster (A–J)
- Cleveland Browns all-time roster (K–Z)
