= 1947 Chicago Rockets season =

American football team season

- Head coach: Jim Crowley and Hampton Pool
- Home stadium: Soldier Field

Results
- Record: 1–13
- Division place: 4th AAFC West
- Playoffs: did not qualify

The 1947 Chicago Rockets season was their second in the All-America Football Conference. The team failed to improve upon their previous output of 5–6–3, winning only one game. They failed to qualify for the playoffs for the second consecutive season.

The team's statistical leaders included Sam Vacanti with 1,571 passing yards, Bill Daley with 447 rushing yards, and Ray Ramsey with 768 receiving yards and 60 points scored (39 extra points, 15 field goals).

== Preseason ==
Game	Date	Opponent	Result	Record	Venue	Attendance	Recap	Sources
1	August 24	vs. Brooklyn Dodgers	L 17–20	0–1	Ute Stadium			

== Schedule ==
Game	Date	Opponent	Result	Record	Venue	Attendance	Recap	Sources
1	August 29	**Los Angeles Dons**	**L** 21–24	0–1	Soldier Field	41,128	Recap	
2	September 5	at New York Yankees	**L** 26–48	0–2	Yankee Stadium	36,777	Recap	
3	September 14	at Buffalo Bills	**L** 20–28	0–3	War Memorial Stadium	33,648	Recap	
4	September 19	Buffalo Bills	**L** 14–31	0–4	Soldier Field	22,685	Recap	
5	September 26	**Cleveland Browns**	**L** 21–41	0–5	Soldier Field	18,450	Recap	
6	October 3	Brooklyn Dodgers	**L** 31–35	0–6	Soldier Field	16,844	Recap	
7	October 12	at **San Francisco 49ers**	**L** 28–42	0–7	Kezar Stadium	23,300	Recap	
8	October 19	at **Cleveland Browns**	**L** 28–31	0–8	Cleveland Municipal Stadium	35,266	Recap	
9	October 24	New York Yankees	**L** 7–28	0–9	Soldier Field	20,310	Recap	
10	October 31	at Brooklyn Dodgers	**L** 3–7	0–10	Ebbets Field	2,960	Recap	
11	November 7	Baltimore Colts	**W** 27–21	1–10	Soldier Field	5,395	Recap	
—	Bye							
12	November 21	**San Francisco 49ers**	**L** 16–41	1–11	Soldier Field	5,791	Recap	
13	November 30	at Baltimore Colts	**L** 7–14	1–12	Memorial Stadium	14,085	Recap	
14	December 7	at **Los Angeles Dons**	**L** 14–34	1–13	Los Angeles Memorial Coliseum	20,856	Recap	
Note: Intra-division opponents are in **bold** text.

== Division standings ==
AAFC Western Division
	W	L	T	PCT	DIV	PF	PA	STK
Cleveland Browns	12	1	1	.923	5–1	410	185	W2
San Francisco 49ers	8	4	2	.667	4–2	327	264	T1
Los Angeles Dons	7	7	0	.500	3–3	328	256	W1
Chicago Rockets	1	13	0	.071	0–6	263	425	L3

Note: Tie games were not officially counted in the standings.

== Roster ==
1947 Chicago Rockets final roster
Quarterbacks: 66 Al Dekdebrun; 69 Sam Vacanti; Backs: 99 Bill Bass DB/RB; 71 Bill Daley FB; 75 Fred Evans DB/RB; 80 Elroy Hirsch DB/RB; 73 Ernie Lewis FB/P; 88 Ray Ramsey DB/RB; 87 Ted Scalissi RB/DB; 60 Bill Schroeder DB/RB; Ends/Receivers: 55 Bob Dove; 52 Ray Ebli; 57 John Harrington; 50 Pat Lahey; 53 Max Morris; 54 John Rokisky K	Linemen/Linebackers: 36 Alex Agase G/MG; 25 Herb Coleman LB/C; 40 Chubby Grigg T; 35 George Hecht G; 74 Bill Kellagher LB/FB; 41 John Kuzman T/DT; 21 Peter Lamana LB; 46 Harley McCollum DT/T; 27 Fred Negus C/LB; 48 Bruno Niedziela T; 32 Jim O'Neal G; 30 Jim Pearcy MG/G; 49 Ben Pucci DT/T; 29 Cliff Rothrock C; 31 Evan Vogds G/MG	Reserve: 64 Angelo Bertelli QB (IR); 51 Jerry Mulready E (IR); 52 Frank Quillen E (IR); 34 Tony Sumpter G/MG (IR); 40 Norm Verry T (IR); Rookies in italics
