= Cleveland Browns all-time roster (K–Z) =

1,649 players have appeared in at least one regular season or postseason game in the National Football League (NFL) or All-America Football Conference (AAFC) for the Cleveland Browns since 1946. This list includes those whose last names fall between "K" and "Z". For the rest, see Cleveland Browns all-time roster (A–J). This list is accurate through the end of the 2025 NFL season.

== K ==
- Mark Kafentzis
- Kyle Kalis
- Sam Kamara
- Jim Kanicki
- Alex Kapter
- Mike Katolin
- Jerry Kauric
- Damontae Kazee
- Case Keenum
- Ernie Kellermann
- Chris Kelley
- Ethan Kelley
- John Kelly
- Leroy Kelly
- Perry Kemp
- Cody Kessler
- Josh Keyes
- Jacob Kibodi
- Billy Kinard
- Brian Kinchen
- Derrick Kindred
- Andre King
- Deon King
- Don King
- Ed King
- Eric King
- Joe King
- Rick Kingrea
- Terry Kirby
- Randy Kirk
- Christian Kirksey
- John Kissell
- Ishmaa'ily Kitchen
- DeShone Kizer
- Robert Kolesar
- Ken Konz
- Bernie Kosar
- Frank Kosikowski
- Mike Kovaleski
- Kyle Kramer
- Rich Kreitling
- Mark Krerowicz
- Paul Kruger
- Rudy Kuechenberg
- Ryan Kuehl
- Jordan Kunaszyk
- Eric Kush

== L ==
- Warren Lahr
- Kendall Lamm
- Noel Lamontagne
- Jarvis Landry
- Gary Lane
- Kenard Lang
- Antonio Langham
- Reggie Langhorne
- Spencer Lanning
- Gage Larvadain
- Shawn Lauvao
- Dante Lavelli
- Devaroe Lawrence
- Gerard Lawson
- Richard LeCounte
- Andy Lee
- Elijah Lee
- Billy Lefear
- Michael Lehan
- Charles Leigh
- Corey Lemonier
- Matt Lengel
- Louis Leonard
- Jim Leonhard
- Jordan Leslie
- KT Leveston
- Jack LeVeck
- Cliff Lewis
- Darryl Lewis
- Jamal Lewis
- Leo Lewis
- Stan Lewis
- Thad Lewis
- Dave Liddick
- George Lilja
- Errol Linden
- Everett Lindsay
- Dale Lindsey
- Bob Lingenfelter
- Goran Lingmerth
- Earl Little
- Greg Little
- Jody Littleton
- Dave Lloyd
- Dave Logan
- Ernie Logan
- Tom London
- Mel Long
- Ricardo Louis
- Cornelius Lucas
- Mike Lucci
- Terry Luck
- Bill Lund
- Rick Lyle
- Robert Lyons

== M ==
- Mel Maceau
- John Macerelli
- Alex Mack
- Kevin Mack
- Nick Maddox
- Anthony Madison
- Brandon Magee
- Kaluka Maiava
- Bobby Majors
- Anthony Malbrough
- Ralph Malone
- Cameron Malveaux
- Tim Manoa
- Johnny Manziel
- Owen Marecic
- David Marshall
- Jim Marshall
- Eric Martin
- Jim Martin
- Easton Mascarenas-Arnold
- Larry Mason
- Mohamed Massaquoi
- Carlton Massey
- Bob Matheson
- Clay Matthews, Jr.
- Baker Mayfield
- Brad Maynard
- Lew Mayne
- Dave Mays
- Tanner McCalister
- Keenan McCardell
- Willie McClung
- Hurvin McCormack
- Mike McCormack
- Jason McCourty
- Josh McCown
- Luke McCown
- Colt McCoy
- Justin McCray
- Robert McCray
- Jim McCusker
- Daylon McCutcheon
- Jacobbi McDaniel
- Brandon McDonald
- Nick McDonald
- Paul McDonald
- Tommy McDonald
- Malik McDowell
- Leon McFadden
- Willis McGahee
- Richmond McGee
- T. Y. McGill
- Willie McGinest
- Bruce McGonnigal
- Cameron McGrone
- Isaiah McGuire
- Corey McIntyre
- Bob McKay
- Keith McKenzie
- Rich McKenzie
- Alvin McKinley
- Takkarist McKinley
- Jeremy McKinney
- Seth McKinney
- Hugh McKinnis
- Jeremiah McKinnon
- Chase McLaughlin
- Thomas McLemore
- Kevin McLeod
- Rodney McLeod
- David McMillan
- Erik McMillan
- Donovan McMillon
- Clifton McNeil
- Gerald McNeil
- Ryan McNeil
- Paul McQuistan
- Tim McTyer
- Montrel Meander
- Jamie Meder
- Dale Memmelaar
- Eric Metcalf
- Wayne Meylan
- Walt Michaels
- Ray Mickens
- Ron Middleton
- Arnold Miller
- Billy Miller
- Cleo Miller
- Darrian Miller
- Herb Miller
- Jamir Miller
- Mark Miller
- Matt Miller
- Nick Miller
- Prince Miller
- Ryan Miller
- Willie Miller
- Keavon Milton
- Barkevious Mingo
- Randy Minniear
- Frank Minnifield
- Barry Minter
- Alvin Mitchell
- Bobby Mitchell
- Cameron Mitchell
- Carlton Mitchell
- Jayme Mitchell
- Mack Mitchell
- Terrance Mitchell
- Dick Modzelewski
- Ed Modzelewski
- Jovante Moffatt
- John Mohring
- Rod Monroe
- Cleo Montgomery
- Aaron Moog
- Elijah Moore
- Eric Moore
- Evan Moore
- Marlon Moore
- Marty Moore
- Stevon Moore
- Earthwind Moreland
- Jake Moreland
- Quincy Morgan
- Pat Moriarty
- Milt Morin
- Chris Morris
- Joe Morris
- Mike Morris
- Fred "Curly" Morrison
- Reece Morrison
- John Morrow
- Frank Morze
- Mark Moseley
- Dom Moselle
- C. J. Mosley
- Kendrick Mosley
- Rich Mostardi
- Raheem Mostert
- Marion Motley
- Nick Mullens
- Fred Murphy
- Eric Murray
- Patrick Murray
- Najee Mustafaa
- Chad Mustard
- Michael Myers
- Toby Myles

== N ==
- Kai Nacua
- Chris Naggar
- Gern Nagler
- Carl Nassib
- JoJo Natson
- Steve Nave
- Bill Nelsen
- Robert Nelson
- Pat Newman
- Greg Newsome II
- Ozzie Newsome
- Vince Newsome
- Scott Nicolas
- Jim Ninowski
- David Njoku
- Chuck Noll
- Dennis Northcutt
- Jordan Norwood
- Ty Nsekhe
- Ed Nutting

== O ==
- Roman Oben
- Fran O'Brien
- Tommy O'Connell
- Bill O'Connor
- Steve Octavien
- McDonald Oden
- Ifeadi Odenigbo
- Cliff Odom
- Emmanuel Ogbah
- Chris Ogbonnaya
- Kendall Ogle
- Larry Ogunjobi
- Shaun O'Hara
- Ogbonnia Okoronkwo
- Mike Oliphant
- Bob Oliver
- Nate Orchard
- Bob Oristaglio
- Shantee Orr
- Babatunde Oshinowo
- Craig Osika
- Chris Owens
- Jeremiah Owusu-Koramoah

== P ==
- Stephen Paea
- Mike Pagel
- Vinston Painter
- Derrell Palmer
- Randy Palmer
- Sam Palumbo
- Babe Parilli
- Frank Parker
- Jerry Parker
- Juqua Parker
- J'Vonne Parker
- Cody Parkey
- Gary Parris
- Bernie Parrish
- Ara Parseghian
- Tony Pashos
- Austin Pasztor
- David Patten
- Joel Patten
- Dimitri Patterson
- Javon Patterson
- Riley Patterson
- Don Paul
- Scott Paxson
- Eddie Payton
- Jordan Payton
- Kalvin Pearson
- Doug Pederson
- Danny Peebles
- Antwan Peek
- Bubba Pena
- Donovan Peoples-Jones
- Jabrill Peppers
- Pete Perini
- Antonio Perkins
- Breshad Perriman
- Jereme Perry
- Michael Dean Perry
- Rod Perry
- Roderick Perry II
- Floyd Peters
- Tony Peters
- Ted Petersen
- Johnny Petitbon
- Don Phelps
- Todd Philcox
- Jacob Phillips
- Mike Phipps
- Steve Pierce
- Nick Pietrosante
- Chris Pike
- Jason Pinkston
- Sabby Piscitelli
- Roman Piskor
- Frank Pitts
- John Pitts
- Scott Player
- Anthony Pleasant
- Milt Plum
- Ethan Pocic
- Tom Polley
- Ryan Pontbriand
- Brodney Pool
- Larry Poole
- Marquez Pope
- Reggie Porter
- Julian Posey
- Hank Poteat
- Craig Powell
- Preston Powell
- Ronnie Powell
- Ricky Powers
- Jordan Poyer
- Travis Prentice
- Jim Prestel
- Brian Price
- Billy Pritchett
- James Proche
- Greg Pruitt
- Mike Pruitt
- Terrelle Pryor
- Bob Ptacek
- Ben Pucci
- Mike Pucillo
- Duane Putnam
- Dave Puzzuoli
- Jim Pyne

== Q ==
- Bill Quinlan
- Skeets Quinlan
- Brady Quinn

== R ==
- Reggie Ragland
- Dave Raimey
- Wali Rainer
- Bobby Rainey
- Gregg Rakoczy
- Damarious Randall
- Damion Ratley
- George Ratterman
- Bert Rechichar
- Barry Redden
- Sheldrick Redwine
- Ken Reeves
- Walter Reeves
- Scott Rehberg
- Winston Reid
- Austin Reiter
- Ray Renfro
- Billy Reynolds
- Chuck Reynolds
- Ed Reynolds
- Errict Rhett
- Jerry Rhome
- Denzel Rice
- Randy Rich
- Ernie Richardson
- Gloster Richardson
- Kyle Richardson
- Sheldon Richardson
- Trent Richardson
- Louis Riddick
- John Rienstra
- Joe Righetti
- Cody Risien
- Andre Rison
- Oscar Roan
- Kevin Robbins
- Derrick Roberson
- Walter Roberts
- Craig Robertson
- Billy Robinson
- Cam Robinson
- DeJuan Robinson
- Derreck Robinson
- Fred Robinson
- Gerell Robinson
- Greg Robinson
- Mike Robinson
- Ramzee Robinson
- Brian Robiskie
- Isaac Rochell
- Chris Rockins
- Chester Rogers
- Don Rogers
- Shaun Rogers
- Tyrone Rogers
- John Rokisky
- Nick Roman
- Jim Romaniszyn
- Ken Rose
- D'Angelo Ross
- Matt Roth
- Lee Rouson
- Patrick Rowe
- Eugene Rowell
- Robert Royal
- Orpheus Roye
- Ahtyba Rubin
- Frostee Rucker
- Martin Rucker
- Reggie Rucker
- Dwayne Rudd
- Orlando Ruff
- Chris Ruhman
- Max Runager
- Mike Rusinek
- Brian Russell
- Frank Ryan
- Lou Rymkus
- Mark Rypien

== S ==
- Lou Saban
- Bill Sabatino
- Pio Sagapolutele
- Rashaan Salaam
- Tarek Saleh
- Dylan Sampson
- Darnell Sanders
- Lewis Sanders
- Raheim Sanders
- Shedeur Sanders
- Steve Sanders
- John Sandusky
- Brian Sanford
- Lucius Sanford
- O. J. Santiago
- De'Ante Saunders
- Charley Scales
- Mike Scarry
- Brian Schaefering
- Dick Schafrath
- Joe Schobert
- Tom Schoen
- Randy Schultz
- Anthony Schwartz
- Mitchell Schwartz
- Bud Schwenk
- Carson Schwesinger
- Bo Scott
- Cedric Scott
- Clarence Scott
- Stan Sczurek
- Ricky Seals-Jones
- Austin Seibert
- Mike Seifert
- Gene Selawski
- Mike Sellers
- Andrew Sendejo
- Dean Sensanbaugher
- Ryan Seymour
- Kevin Shaffer
- Ed Sharkey
- Tyrone Shavers
- Connor Shaw
- Sedrick Shaw
- Aaron Shea
- Jabaal Sheard
- Danny Shelton
- L. J. Shelton
- Leslie Shepherd
- Henry Sheppard
- Stan Sheriff
- Jerry Sherk
- Dick Shiner
- Roger Shoals
- Jim Shofner
- Jim Shorter
- Don Shula
- Marshall Shurnas
- Mike Sikich
- Tony Simmons
- Lenny Simonetti
- Kevin Simons
- Darryl Sims
- Mickey Sims
- Brian Sipe
- Joe Skibinski
- Buster Skrine
- Webster Slaughter
- Kiero Small
- Brad Smelley
- Alex Smith
- Andre Smith
- Armond Smith
- Bob Smith
- Brian Smith
- Chris Smith
- C. J. Smith
- Clifton Smith (born 1980)
- Clifton Smith (born 1985)
- Daryle Smith
- Derron Smith
- Elerson Smith
- Gaylon Smith
- Irv Smith Sr.
- Jim Ray Smith
- John Smith
- Ken Smith
- Malcolm Smith
- Mark Smith
- Marquis Smith
- Ralph Smith
- Rico Smith
- Rob Smith
- Robaire Smith
- Rodney Smith
- Shaun Smith
- Terrelle Smith
- Za'Darius Smith
- Ron Snidow
- Scott Solomon
- Nick Sorensen
- Isaac Sowells
- Dave Sparenberg
- Quinton Spears
- Mac Speedie
- Nick Speegle
- Del Speer
- Joe Spencer
- Greg Spires
- Marcus Spriggs
- John St. Clair
- Mike St. Clair
- Donté Stallworth
- Josh Stamer
- Frank Stams
- Johnny Stanton
- Randy Starks
- Paul Staroba
- Eric Steinbach
- Don Steinbrunner
- Emmanuel Stephens
- Larry Stephens
- Syndric Steptoe
- Bob Steuber
- Ricky Stevenson
- Andrew Stewart
- Matt Stewart
- M. J. Stewart
- Jim Stienke
- Ben Stille
- Barry Stokes
- Matt Stover
- Tim Stracka
- Rod Streater
- Don Strock
- Pierre Strong
- Chansi Stuckey
- Lee Suggs
- Dave Sullivan
- Gerry Sullivan
- Tom Sullivan
- Freddie Summers
- Walt Sumner
- Rex Sunahara
- Ed Sustersic
- Eddie Sutter
- Geoff Swaim
- George Swarn
- Andre Szmyt

== T ==
- Joe Taffoni
- Sione Takitaki
- John Talley
- Ralph Tamm
- Carl Taseff
- Ben Tate
- Adarius Taylor
- Ben Taylor
- Jamar Taylor
- Phil Taylor
- Ryan Taylor (born 1976)
- Ryan Taylor (born 1987)
- Taywan Taylor
- Terry Taylor
- Tyrod Taylor
- Vincent Taylor
- Alex Taylor-Prioleau
- Mike Teifke
- Randall Telfer
- Wyatt Teller
- Derek Tennell
- George Terlep
- Ray Terrell
- Vinny Testaverde
- Jim Thaxton
- John Thierry
- Cameron Thomas
- Chad Thomas
- Charlie Thomas
- Isaiah Thomas
- Joe Thomas
- Johnny Thomas
- Santonio Thomas
- Tavierre Thomas
- Chris Thome
- Bennie Thompson
- Chaun Thompson
- Kevin Thompson
- Mike Thompson
- Tedric Thompson
- Tommy Thompson
- Dorian Thompson-Robinson
- Juan Thornhill
- John Thornton
- Jamari Thrash
- Sam Tidmore
- Leo Tierney
- Cedric Tillman
- Lawyer Tillman
- Keith Tinsley
- Tommy Togiai
- Mike Tomczak
- Dalvin Tomlinson
- Kadarius Toney
- Bryce Treggs
- J. C. Tretter
- Kiante Tripp
- Rick Trocano
- Jason Trusnik
- Joe Tryon-Shoyinka
- Ryan Tucker
- Travis Tucker
- Tom Tupa
- Robert Turbin
- Jesse Turnbow
- Eric Turner
- Kevin Turner
- Brian Tyms

== U ==
- Ed Ulinski
- Edefuan Ulofoshio
- Mason Unck
- Marvin Upshaw

== V ==
- Tanner Vallejo
- Steve Vallos
- Ralph Van Dyke
- Brad Van Pelt
- Tommy Vardell
- David Veikune
- Raymond Ventrone
- Ross Verba
- Olivier Vernon
- David Verser
- Lawrence Vickers
- Dan Vitale

== W ==
- Trevin Wade
- Bryan Wagner
- Van Waiters
- Anthony Walker Jr.
- Dwight Walker
- P.J. Walker
- Martin Wallace
- Seneca Wallace
- Everson Walls
- Raymond Walls
- Dale Walters
- Carl Ward
- Denzel Ward
- T. J. Ward
- Paul Warfield
- Gerard Warren
- Brian Washington
- Ted Washington
- Earl Watford
- Tom Watkins
- Ben Watson
- Deshaun Watson
- Leroy Watson
- Louis Watson
- Nathaniel Watson
- Remi Watson
- Clarence Weathers
- Curtis Weathers
- Curtis Weaver
- Ken Webb
- Sam Webb
- Chuck Weber
- Larry Webster
- Brandon Weeden
- Terrance West
- Eric Westmoreland
- Bob White
- Charles White
- Jamel White
- Lorenzo White
- Jermaine Whitehead
- Blake Whiteheart
- Charlie Whitehurst
- Bob Whitlow
- Donte Whitner
- Fozzy Whittaker
- Mike Whitwell
- Paul Wiggin
- Barry Wilburn
- Jerry Wilkinson
- A. D. Williams
- Clarence Williams
- Corey Williams
- Demetrius Williams
- Eddie Williams
- Gene Williams
- Greedy Williams
- James Williams
- Kasen Williams
- K'Waun Williams
- Larry Williams
- Lawrence Williams
- Leon Williams
- Marquez Williams
- Roosevelt Williams
- Sid Williams
- Tramon Williams
- Trayveon Williams
- Wally Williams
- Derrick Willies
- Bill Willis
- Jedrick Wills Jr.
- Mack Wilson
- Tommy Wilson
- Travis Wilson
- Troy Wilson
- Kamerion Wimbley
- Perrion Winfrey
- Blake Wingle
- Billy Winn
- Chase Winovich
- George Winslow
- Kellen Winslow II
- Glenn Winston
- Jameis Winston
- Frank Winters
- Mike Wise
- Jeff Wiska
- Dave Wohlabaugh
- Ron Wolfley
- Floyd Womack
- Michael Woods II
- Rob Woods
- Xavier Woodson-Luster
- Rolly Woolsey
- John Wooten
- Mark Word
- Junior Wren
- Alex Wright
- Alvin Wright
- Eric Wright
- Felix Wright
- Gabe Wright
- George Wright
- Jason Wright
- Keith Wright
- Kenny Wright
- Craig Wycinsky
- Spergon Wynn
- Luke Wypler

== Y ==
- William Yanchar
- Billy Yates
- John Yonakor
- Cade York
- George Young
- Glen Young
- Scott Young
- Usama Young
- George Youngblood
- Sid Youngelman
- Christian Yount
- Dave Yovanovits

== Z ==
- Steve Zahursky
- Bailey Zappe
- Dave Zastudil
- Eric Zeier
- Kevin Zeitler
- Lance Zeno
- Anthony Zettel
- Justin Zimmer
- Zak Zinter
- Paul Zukauskas
