= Edgar Jones (running back) =

American football player (1920–2004)

- Jones in 1948, after the Browns won a third AAFC championship

No. 21, 90, 27, 37
- Positions: Running back, defensive back

Personal information
- Born: May 6, 1920; Scranton, Pennsylvania, U.S.
- Died: May 18, 2004 (aged 84); Scranton, Pennsylvania, U.S.
- Listed height: 5 ft 10 in (1.78 m)
- Listed weight: 193 lb (88 kg)

Career information
- High school: Scranton
- College: Pittsburgh (1938–1941)
- NFL draft: 1942: 19th round, 180th overall pick

Career history

Playing
- Chicago Bears (1945); Cleveland Browns (1946–1949); Hamilton Tiger-Cats (1950)

Coaching
- Hamilton Tiger-Cats (1950) Assistant coach; Pittsburgh Steelers (1953) Backfield coach; Scranton Miners (1966) Assistant coach

Awards and highlights
- 4× AAFC champion (1946–1949); Second-team All-Eastern (1941)

Career NFL + AAFC statistics
- Rushing yards: 1,550
- Rushing average: 5.2
- Receptions: 33
- Receiving yards: 635
- Total touchdowns: 29
- Stats at Pro Football Reference

Edgar Francis "Special Delivery" Jones (May 6, 1920 – May 18, 2004) was an American professional football running back who played for the Chicago Bears of the National Football League (NFL) and Cleveland Browns of the All-America Football Conference (AAFC). Jones played college football at the University of Pittsburgh where he finished seventh in the Heisman Trophy voting in 1941.

Jones grew up in Scranton, Pennsylvania, and attended the University of Pittsburgh, where he was a standout on the school's football team. After college, Jones entered the U.S. Navy during World War II. Upon his discharge in 1945, he joined the Bears for one game before he was banned by the NFL's commissioner because he had signed a contract to play for the Browns in the rival AAFC. He joined the Browns in 1946 and remained on the team through the 1949 season; Cleveland won the AAFC championship in each of Jones's four seasons.

In 1950, Jones played for the Hamilton Tiger-Cats of the Interprovincial Rugby Football Union and set a league scoring record. The following year, Jones began a brief coaching career at Pitt, his alma mater, and with the NFL's Pittsburgh Steelers. Later in life, he worked as a recreation superintendent in Scranton and founded the Pennsylvania Sports Hall of Fame.

== Early life ==
Jones grew up in Scranton, Pennsylvania, where he excelled in football and baseball. As a 17-year-old, he was the pitcher for his high school team in an exhibition game in Scranton against the professional St. Louis Cardinals. He was recruited by several major-league baseball teams out of high school.

== College career ==
Jones attended the University of Pittsburgh and played on the school's varsity football team starting as a sophomore in 1939. He was one of the most lauded halfbacks in the country in college. In a 1939 game against Carnegie Tech, he threw a 50-yard pass to Bob Thurbon for a touchdown as time expired for the only score of the game. In 1940, however, he lost the spot as Pittsburgh's primary forward passing threat to George Kracum, a fullback. In 1941, he had a strong game against Fordham University, returning an interception for a touchdown and throwing a touchdown on offense. He finished seventh in Heisman Trophy voting that year.

== Professional career ==
Jones was drafted 180th in the 19th round in December 1941 by the Chicago Bears of the National Football League but delayed his professional career to join the U.S. Navy during World War II. While in the military, Jones played on service football teams.

Jones was discharged in 1945 and signed a contract to play for the Bears, but a controversy erupted when it was revealed he also had a contract to play in 1946 for the Cleveland Browns of the new All-America Football Conference. After playing in just one game for the Bears, Elmer Layden, the NFL's commissioner, barred him from further participation in the league because of his AAFC contract. Layden said the NFL's policy "is not to permit players who have signed alleged player contracts with an unrecognized league to play football in the National Football League when it is such player's intention to play but for one year".

Jones joined the Browns when the team started play the following year in the AAFC. With the Browns, he was known for his skill in making tough short-yardage plays. He was also a leader who was willing to stand up to coach Paul Brown. Jones was fifth in the AAFC in 1946 with 539 rushing yards, placing behind his teammate Marion Motley. He was also third in the league in yards per carry with seven. The Browns won the AAFC championship that year by beating the AAFC's New York Yankees, 14–9. In 1947, Jones missed five games due to injury but still led the AAFC in average yards per carry, with 6.4, as the Browns won the championship again.

Jones remained with the Browns in 1948 as the team went undefeated and won the title for the third time in a row. He scored two touchdowns in the championship game. In a 1949 game against the Los Angeles Dons, Jones suffered a broken collarbone and missed the remainder of the regular season. The Browns again reached the championship, and Jones returned to play in the game, which Cleveland won for the fourth straight time. His shoulder continued to bother him, however, and he decided to retire after the season.

Jones played most of his professional career as a second fiddle to Motley, a fullback, and Otto Graham, the Browns' star quarterback. He nevertheless was an important part of the Browns' offensive attack. Graham said that while he was not very fast, he was "always good in short yardage". Paul Brown considered him one of the finest clutch players he ever had.

Despite retiring, Jones returned to football in 1950 with the Hamilton Tiger-Cats of the Interprovincial Rugby Football Union, and was one of the circuit's top scorers. By the end of October, he had scored 102 points in 11 games, breaking a league record.

== NFL/AAFC career statistics ==
Legend
	Won the AAFC championship
**Bold**	Career high

=== Regular season ===
Year	Team	Games		Rushing				Receiving			
Year	Team	GP	GS	Att	Yds	Avg	TD	Rec	Yds	Avg	TD
1945	CHI	1	0	8	41	5.1	0	1	0	0.0	0
1946	CLE	14	13	77	**539**	**7.0**	4	4	120	**30.0**	1
1947	CLE	9	5	69	443	6.4	**5**	5	92	18.4	1
1948	CLE	13	9	**100**	400	4.0	**5**	**14**	**293**	20.9	**5**
1949	CLE	7	5	43	127	3.0	4	9	130	14.4	3
		44	32	297	1,550	5.2	18	33	635	19.2	10

=== Playoffs ===
Year	Team	Games		Rushing				Receiving			
Year	Team	GP	GS	Att	Yds	Avg	TD	Rec	Yds	Avg	TD
1946	CLE	1	1	10	16	1.6	0	3	45	**15.0**	0
1947	CLE	1	0	10	27	2.7	1	3	31	10.3	0
1948	CLE	1	1	8	29	**3.6**	1	3	39	13.0	**1**
1949	CLE	2	2	**22**	**73**	3.3	**2**	**7**	**83**	11.9	0
		5	4	50	145	2.9	4	16	198	12.4	1

== Coaching career ==
Jones in 1951 signed on to be the backfield coach at the University of Pittsburgh, his alma mater. He had wanted to begin a coaching career and heard that Pitt's old backfield coach was leaving for the University of Oregon. He applied and got the job with the help of a recommendation from Brown. He spent two years at Pitt, before joining the Pittsburgh Steelers of the NFL as backfield coach, but he retired soon after.

== Later life and death ==
Jones was the superintendent of Scranton's recreation bureau for two years in the mid-1960s. He later founded the Pennsylvania Sports Hall of Fame, into which he was inducted in 1983.
