= Bob Cowan =

American football player (1923–2004)

- Cowan during his Indiana University career

No. 17, 80, 83
- Position: Halfback

Personal information
- Born: January 2, 1923; Fort Wayne, Indiana, U.S.
- Died: January 20, 2004 (aged 81); Fort Wayne, Indiana, U.S.
- Listed height: 5 ft 11 in (1.80 m)
- Listed weight: 185 lb (84 kg)

Career information
- High school: North Side (Fort Wayne)
- College: Indiana (1942, 1946)
- NFL draft: 1945: 12th round, 111th overall pick

Career history
- Cleveland Browns (1947-1948); Baltimore Colts (1949)

Awards and highlights
- 2× AAFC champion (1947, 1948)

Career AAFC statistics
- Rushing yards: 280
- Rushing average: 3.9
- Receptions: 21
- Receiving yards: 351
- Total touchdowns: 8
- Stats at Pro Football Reference

Robert George Cowan (January 2, 1923 – January 20, 2004) was an American football halfback who played three seasons in the All-America Football Conference (AAFC) between 1947 and 1949. Cowan played for the Cleveland Browns and the Baltimore Colts.

Cowan was a standout track and football athlete at his Fort Wayne, Indiana high school. He attended Indiana University and starred as a halfback for two years, interrupted by service in the Army Air Force during World War II. Cowan joined the Browns in 1947, when the team won the AAFC championship. Cleveland won all of its games in 1948 and beat the Buffalo Bills in the championship game. Cowan was sent to the Colts for the 1949 season, but he was slowed by a knee injury and left the game a year later. He became a high school principal in Fort Wayne after his playing career.

== High school and college career ==
Cowan grew up in Fort Wayne, Indiana and was a star athlete at the city's North Side High School. He failed to place first just once in the 220-yard dash during his high school track career. Cowan came in second in his only loss at a state track meet in his sophomore year. He had times of 9.9 seconds in the 100-yard dash, under 22 seconds in the 220 and 49 seconds in the 440. Cowan's football team lost only twice in four years at North Side. The team went unbeaten in his senior year, and Cowan broke a state high school scoring record with 155 points playing as a right halfback.

Cowan attended Indiana University starting in 1941. He became the football team's starting right halfback in the middle of the following year, his sophomore season. Cowan also played basketball at Indiana, and was spotted during a state tournament in 1941 by Blanton Collier, who went on to become an assistant coach for the Cleveland Browns of the All-America Football Conference (AAFC).

Cowan joined the Army Air Force in 1943 and served in World War II as part of the ground crew at various military bases and at Okinawa. He played in 1944 for the service basketball team at a Salt Lake City, Utah base called the Air Base Wings. After the war, he returned to Indiana and played part of the 1946 season at right halfback. His best game for Indiana came against the Rose Bowl champion Illinois, when he caught a pass for a 37-yard touchdown and helped set up a second touchdown with a run as the Hoosiers won by seven points.

== Professional career ==
Cowan was selected by the Chicago Cardinals in the 12th round of the 1945 NFL draft. The war delayed his professional career, however, and he signed in 1947 with the Browns, who selected him in the 1947 AAFC Draft. Cowan won a spot on the roster alongside fellow Fort Wayne native and Indiana graduate Bill Boedeker. The Browns finished the season with a 12–1–1 record and won the AAFC championship game against the New York Yankees. After the season, he returned to Indiana to finish his final semester and get a degree.

Cowan returned to the Browns in 1948. The team won all of its games that year, beating the Buffalo Bills in the championship game. Cowan, however, lost his job as the starting right halfback late in the season to Dub Jones. He was sent to the Baltimore Colts before the 1949 season. Bothered by a knee injury, Cowan left football after a year in Baltimore.

== Later life and death ==
Cowan returned to Fort Wayne after his playing career and became a high school principal. ·He retired from the Fort Wayne Community Schools as Personnel Director after 30 years of service. He died in 2004.
