= Jerry Mulready =

American football player (1923–1976)

No. 51
- Positions: End, defensive end

Personal information
- Born: January 5, 1923; Fargo, North Dakota, U.S.
- Died: June 3, 1976 (aged 53); Fargo, North Dakota, U.S.
- Listed height: 6 ft 1 in (1.85 m)
- Listed weight: 205 lb (93 kg)

Career information
- High school: Central (Fargo)
- College: Minnesota; North Dakota State
- NFL draft: 1947: 19th round, 169th overall pick

Career history
- Chicago Rockets (1947)

Career AAFC statistics
- Receptions: 7
- Receiving yards: 108
- Stats at Pro Football Reference

Jerry Mulready (January 5, 1923 – June 3, 1976) was an American football end. He was drafted by the Pittsburgh Steelers in the 19th round (169th overall) of the 1947 NFL Draft. He played for the Chicago Rockets of the AAFC in 1947.
