= Bruno Niedziela =

American football player (1923–1962)

No. 48
- Position: Tackle

Personal information
- Born: April 12, 1923; Chicago, Illinois, U.S.
- Died: March 22, 1962 (aged 38); Richmond, Illinois, U.S.
- Listed height: 6 ft 2 in (1.88 m)
- Listed weight: 225 lb (102 kg)

Career information
- High school: Crane (IL)
- College: Iowa
- NFL draft: 1945: 19th round, 192 (by Chicago Bears)th overall pick

Career history
- Chicago Rockets (1947)

Career AAFC statistics
- Games played: 12 (Note: Pro Football Archives lists 10 games played.)
- Stats at Pro Football Reference

Bruno Joseph Niedziela (April 12, 1923 – March 22, 1962) was an American football tackle who played one season in the All-America Football Conference (AAFC) for the Chicago Rockets. He played college football for Iowa.

Niedziela was born on April 12, 1923, in Chicago, Illinois. He attended Crane High School there, and was a champion wrestler. Following his graduation around 1942, he played college football for the University of Iowa. He won a major letter that year, and started five out of ten games.

He was drafted to serve in World War II in 1943, and was a member of the United States Marine Corps from 1943 to 1945.

He returned to University of Iowa in 1946, and was the starting right tackle. He left the school in 1947, signing a professional football contract with the Chicago Rockets of the All-America Football Conference (AAFC). Overall, in the 1947 AAFC season, Niedziela appeared in twelve games and was a starter in nine of them. He left the team in 1948.

Niedziela later owned a tavern near Richmond, Illinois. He died by suicide on March 22, 1962, at the age of 38.
