= Spiro Dellerba =

American football player (1923–1968)

- Dellerba on a matchbook from the early 1940s

No. 70
- Positions: Linebacker, Fullback

Personal information
- Born: January 25, 1923; Ashtabula, Ohio, U.S.
- Died: August 19, 1968 (aged 45); Ashtabula, Ohio, U.S.
- Listed height: 5 ft 11 in (1.80 m)
- Listed weight: 200 lb (91 kg)

Career information
- High school: Ashtabula
- College: Ohio State University

Career history
- Hamilton Tiger-Cats (1946); Cleveland Browns (1947); Baltimore Colts (1948–1949)

Awards and highlights
- AAFC champion (1947)

Career statistics
- Games: 31
- Rushing yards: 176
- Stats at Pro Football Reference

Spiro Dellerba (January 25, 1923 – August 19, 1968) was an American football fullback and linebacker who played three seasons in the All-America Football Conference (AAFC) between 1947 and 1949. Dellerba played for the Cleveland Browns and the Baltimore Colts.

Dellerba grew up in Ashtabula, Ohio and attended Ohio State University. After serving in World War II, he joined the Hamilton Tiger-Cats for one year in 1946 before joining the Browns, becoming the first man from Ashtabula to play professional football. Dellerba then played two seasons for the Colts before leaving the sport.

== High school and college career ==
Dellerba was from Ashtabula, Ohio and attended high school there. He played football and basketball at Ashtabula High School. Dellerba attended Ohio State University starting in 1941 and played on the school's football team under head coach Paul Brown. Dellerba, however, was one of seven Ohio State football players dismissed from the school in the summer of 1942 for failing to maintain a 1.5 grade point average. Dellerba served in the military during World War II and played football for the Personnel Distribution Command Comets, a service team.

== Professional football career ==
Dellerba played a season for the Canadian Football League's Hamilton Tiger-Cats in 1946. The following year, he joined the Cleveland Browns in the All-America Football Conference (AAFC). Dellerba was the first man from Ashtabula to play professional football. The Browns finished the regular season with a 12–1–1 record and beat the New York Yankees to win the AAFC championship. Dellerba was sent to the Baltimore Colts in early 1948 along with Browns teammates Lew Mayne and Marshall Shurnas as part of an effort to balance talent among the AAFC's teams. He spent two seasons playing for the Colts before leaving football.
