= 1947 Los Angeles Dons season =

American football team season

- Head coach: Mel Hein, Ted Shipkey, and Dudley DeGroot
- Home stadium: Los Angeles Memorial Coliseum

Results
- Record: 7–7
- Division place: 3rd AAFC West
- Playoffs: Did not qualify

The Dons' October 26 home game against the expansion Baltimore Colts was the most one-sided win of the season. (R-L: John Kimbrough, Dale Gentry, Burr Baldwin, Bob Nowasky, Sugarfoot Anderson.)

Program for the Dons' November 2 matchup with the rival San Francisco 49ers. (L-R: Joe Aguirre, Ray Frankowski, Earl Audet. Below: Al Lolotai.)

The 1947 Los Angeles Dons season was their second in the All-America Football Conference. The team failed to improve on their previous output of 7–5–2, losing seven games. They failed to qualify for the playoffs for the second consecutive season.

The team's statistical leaders included Charlie O'Rourke with 1,449 passing yards, John Kimbrough with 562 rushing yards, Dale Gentry with 352 receiving yards, and Ben Agajanian with 84 points scored (39 extra points, 15 field goals).

== Season schedule ==
Week	Date	Opponent	Result	Record	Attendance	Venue	Recap	Sources
1	August 29	at **Chicago Rockets**	**W** 24–21	1–0	41,182	Soldier Field	Recap	
2	September 7	at **San Francisco 49ers**	**L** 14–17	1–1	31,298	Kezar Stadium	Recap	
3	September 12	New York Yankees	**L** 14–30	1–2	82,675	Los Angeles Memorial Coliseum	Recap	
4	September 19	Brooklyn Dodgers	**W** 48–21	2–2	38,481	Los Angeles Memorial Coliseum	Recap	
5	Bye							
6	October 5	Buffalo Bills	**L** 25–27	2–3	34,997	Los Angeles Memorial Coliseum	Recap	
7	October 12	at **Cleveland Browns**	**W** 13–10	3–3	63,124	Cleveland Municipal Stadium	Recap	
8	October 19	at Baltimore Colts	**W** 38–10	4–3	36,852	Municipal Stadium	Recap	
9	October 26	Baltimore Colts	**W** 56–0	5–3	25,148	Los Angeles Memorial Coliseum	Recap	
10	November 2	**San Francisco 49ers**	**L** 16–26	5–4	54,974	Los Angeles Memorial Coliseum	Recap	
11	November 9	at Buffalo Bills	**L** 0–25	5–5	21,293	Civic Stadium	Recap	
12	November 16	at New York Yankees	**L** 13–16	5–6	37,625	Yankee Stadium	Recap	
13	November 23	at Brooklyn Dodgers	**W** 16–12	6–6	11,866	Ebbets Field	Recap	
14	November 27	**Cleveland Browns**	**L** 17–27	6–7	45,099	Los Angeles Memorial Coliseum	Recap	
15	December 7	**Chicago Rockets**	**W** 34–14	7–7	20,856	Los Angeles Memorial Coliseum	Recap	
Note: Intra-division opponents are in **bold** text.

== Division standings ==
AAFC Western Division
	W	L	T	PCT	DIV	PF	PA	STK
Cleveland Browns	12	1	1	.923	5–1	410	185	W2
San Francisco 49ers	8	4	2	.667	4–2	327	264	T1
Los Angeles Dons	7	7	0	.500	3–3	328	256	W1
Chicago Rockets	1	13	0	.071	0–6	263	425	L3

Note: Tie games were not officially counted in the standings.

== Roster ==
1947 Los Angeles Dons final roster
Backs: 82 Harry Clarke RB/CB; 80 Walt Clay RB/CB; 65 Glenn Dobbs S/P/QB; 93 Chuck Fenenbock RB; 73 Walter Heap CB/RB; 95 Harry Hopp CB/RB; 85 Bob Kelly RB/CB; 77 John Kimbrough FB; 99 Mort Landsberg RB; 97 Bob Mitchell RB/CB; 66 Charlie O'Rourke QB/S; 84 Bert Piggott CB/RB; 60 Bill Reinhard RB	Linemen/Linebackers: 44 Lee Artoe DT/T; 42 Earl Audet DT/T; 40 Pete Berezney T; 29 John Brown C/LB; 27 Dick Danehe T; 34 Ray Frankowski G; 36 Bernie Gallagher G/DG; 32 Reid Lennan G; 35 Butch Levy DG/G; 30 Al Lolotai G/DG; 43 Paul Mitchell T/DT; 22 Bob Nelson LB/C; 33 Bill Radovich DG/G; 45 Bob Reinhard LB/FB/T; 47 Jim Smith T/DT	Ends/Receivers: 56 Ezzrett Anderson; 57 Joe Aguirre; 52 Burr Baldwin; 53 Dale Gentry; 55 Bob Nowaskey; 50 Bob Titchenal; Special teams: 3 Ben Agajanian K; rookies in italics
