= 1947 AAFC season =

American football season

AAFC teams: West, East

The 1947 AAFC season was the second season of the All-America Football Conference. The league included eight teams, broken up into Eastern and Western divisions, which played a 14-game official schedule, culminating in a league Championship Game.

After the end of the previous season, the Miami Seahawks were $350,000 in debt, with owner Harvey Hester being declared bankrupt, and leaving the AAFC with no option to shut down the franchise. They would be replaced in the Eastern division by the Baltimore Colts. The Buffalo Bisons also chose to rebrand their franchise, holding a contest to determine the new name: the winner requested the new name to be the Buffalo Bills, named after "Buffalo Bill" Cody.

== Draft ==
The league's first collegiate draft was held on December 20–21, 1946 in Cleveland, Ohio. Ernie Case was the first overall selection.

== Regular season ==
=== Week One ===
The 1947 regular season of the All-America Football Conference kicked off on Friday, August 29 with a game between the Los Angeles Dons and the Chicago Rockets. The game was attended by 41,812 people, only about 70% of that of last season. Former Washington Redskins coach Dudley DeGroot was able to pull off a victory against the Rockets with a score of 24–21.

The week continued with two games on Sunday, August 31, with the San Francisco 49ers beating the Brooklyn Dodgers 23–7, in front of 31,874 people at Kezar Stadium, and the Buffalo Bills beating the New York Yankees 28–24, in front of 32,385 people.

=== 1947 AAFC final standings ===
W = Wins, L = Losses, T = Ties, Pct. = Winning Percentage
PF = Points Scored For, PA = Point Scored Against

AAFC Eastern Division
	W	L	T	PCT	DIV	PF	PA	STK
New York Yankees	11	2	1	.846	5–1	378	239	W2
Buffalo Bills	8	4	2	.667	4–1–1	320	288	T1
Brooklyn Dodgers	3	10	1	.231	1–4–1	181	340	L3
Baltimore Colts	2	11	1	.154	1–5	167	377	L1

Note: Tie games were not officially counted in the standings.

AAFC Western Division
	W	L	T	PCT	DIV	PF	PA	STK
Cleveland Browns	12	1	1	.923	5–1	410	185	W2
San Francisco 49ers	8	4	2	.667	4–2	327	264	T1
Los Angeles Dons	7	7	0	.500	3–3	328	256	W1
Chicago Rockets	1	13	0	.071	0–6	263	425	L3

Note: Tie games were not officially counted in the standings.

== Championship game ==
AAFC Championship: Cleveland 14, New York 3 (December 14 @ New York)
