= 1947 San Francisco 49ers season =

American football team season

- Owner: Tony Morabito
- General manager: John Blackinger
- Head coach: Buck Shaw
- Home stadium: Kezar Stadium

Results
- Record: 8–4–2
- Division place: 2nd AAFC West
- Playoffs: Did not qualify

The 1947 San Francisco 49ers season was the franchise's second season in the All-America Football Conference (AAFC). They began the season hoping to improve upon the previous season's output of 9–5, and they had a similar output this season, 8–4–2. The team did have its first tie in franchise history, a 28–28 standoff in week 6 against the Baltimore Colts. For the second time in as many seasons, the 49ers placed 2nd in the West division, coming one spot short of playing in the league championship game.

The team's statistical leaders included Frankie Albert with 1,692 passing yards, Johnny Strzykalski with 906 rushing yards, and Alyn Beals with 655 receiving yards and 60 points scored.

Although the All-America Football Conference was integrated from its inception, the 1947 49ers did not have a single black player on their roster.

== Staff ==
1947 San Francisco 49ers staff
Front office: Principal Owner – Tony Morabito; General Manager – John Blackinger; Head coaches: Head coach – Buck Shaw; Offensive coaches: Lines – Albert J. Ruffo	Defensive coaches: Ends – Jim Lawson

== Roster ==
1947 San Francisco 49ers final roster
Quarterbacks: 63 Frankie Albert P; 62 Jesse Freitas S/P; 64 Bev Wallace; Ends/Receivers: 57 Ed Balatti; 53 Alyn Beals; 56 Bill Fisk; 51 Dick Horne; 55 Hank Norberg; 58 Nick Susoeff	Linemen/Linebackers: 25 Jack Baldwin LB/C; 33 Bruno Banducci LB/G; 35 Dick Bassi G/MG; 42 Bob Bryant T/DT; 21 Tony Calvelli C/LB; 22 Gerry Conlee C/LB; 36 Dutch Elston LB/C/G; 34 Eddie Forrest MG/G; 32 Garland Gregory G/MG; 47 Visco Grgich DT/T; 74 Mickey Masini LB/FB; 48 Al Satterfield DT/T; 24 John Schiechl LB/C; 23 George Smith LB; 46 Rupe Thornton G/T/MG/DT; 41 John Woudenberg T/DT	Backs: 85 Eddie Carr CB/RB; 81 Len Eshmont RB/S; 83 Ned Mathews CB/RB; 84 Earle Parsons CB/RB; 71 Ed Robnett FB/LB; 72 Norm Standlee LB/FB; 91 Johnny Strzykalski RB/CB; 82 Joe Vetrano K/CB/RB; 94 Wally Yonamine RB/CB; rookies in italics

== Preseason ==
Week	Date	Opponent	Result	Record	Venue	Attendance	Sources
1	August 24	Los Angeles Dons	L 7–14	0–1	Kezar Stadium	40,000	

== Schedule ==
Program for the 49ers November 2 game with the rival Los Angeles Dons.

Game	Date	Opponent	Result	Record	Venue	Attendance	Sources
1	August 31	Brooklyn Dodgers	**W** 23–7	1–0	Kezar Stadium	31,874	
2	September 7	**Los Angeles Dons**	**W** 17–14	2–0	Kezar Stadium	31,298	
3	September 14	Baltimore Colts	**W** 14–7	3–0	Kezar Stadium	25,787	
4	September 21	New York Yankees	**L** 16–21	3–1	Kezar Stadium	52,819	
5	September 28	at Buffalo Bills	**W** 41–24	4–1	Civic Stadium	36,099	
6	October 5	at Baltimore Colts	**T** 28–28	4–1–1	Memorial Stadium	29,556	
7	October 12	**Chicago Rockets**	**W** 42–28	5–1–1	Kezar Stadium	23,300	
—	Bye						
8	October 26	**Cleveland Browns**	**L** 7–14	5–2–1	Kezar Stadium	54,483	
9	November 2	at **Los Angeles Dons**	**W** 26–16	6–2–1	L.A. Memorial Coliseum	53,726	
10	November 9	at New York Yankees	**L** 16–24	6–3–1	Yankee Stadium	37,342	
11	November 16	at **Cleveland Browns**	**L** 14–37	6–4–1	Cleveland Municipal Stadium	76,504	
12	November 21	at **Chicago Rockets**	**W** 41–16	7–4–1	Soldier Field	5,791	
13	November 27	at Brooklyn Dodgers	**W** 21–7	8–4–1	Ebbets Field	9,837	
14	December 7	Buffalo Bills	**T** 21–21	8–4–2	Kezar Stadium	22,943	
Note: Intra-division opponents are in **bold** text.

== Standings ==
AAFC Western Division
	W	L	T	PCT	DIV	PF	PA	STK
Cleveland Browns	12	1	1	.923	5–1	410	185	W2
San Francisco 49ers	8	4	2	.667	4–2	327	264	T1
Los Angeles Dons	7	7	0	.500	3–3	328	256	W1
Chicago Rockets	1	13	0	.071	0–6	263	425	L3

Note: Tie games were not officially counted in the standings.
