= Mickey Masini =

American football player and coach (1922–2000)

- Mickey Masini, 1967

No. 74, 68
- Positions: Fullback, linebacker

Personal information
- Born: October 6, 1922; Firebaugh, California
- Died: September 27, 2000 (age 77)
- Listed height: 6 ft 0 in (1.83 m)
- Listed weight: 225 lb (102 kg)

Career information
- High school: Fresno Tech (CA)
- College: Fresno State

Career history
- San Francisco 49ers (1947-1948); Los Angeles Dons (1948)

Career statistics
- Games: 24
- Stats at Pro Football Reference

Leonard Leroy Masini (October 6, 1922 – September 27, 2000), commonly known as Mickey Masini, was an American football player and coach. He played at the fullback, blocking back, and linebacker positions for Fresno State in college and later for the San Francisco 49ers and Los Angeles Dons.

== Early life ==
Masini was born in 1922 in Firebaugh, California. He attended and played football at Technical High School. He earned all-San Joaquin Valley honors in 1940.

== Military and college football ==
He played college football for Fresno State from 1940 to 1942 and again in 1946. He was part of the "Phantom Four" backfield that led the 1942 Fresno State Bulldogs football team that compiled a 9–1 record and won the California Collegiate Athletic Association championship. He received all-California Athletic Association and Little All-America honors in 1942 and 1946.

His college career was interrupted by service in the United States Army Air Corps during World War II. From 1942 to 1945, he served in Africa, Italy and France as part of the teletype unit of the 32nd Bomb Squadron.

== Professional football ==
He played professional football in the All-America Football Conference for the San Francisco 49ers in 1947 and for the 49ers and Los Angeles Dons in their 1948 seasons.

== Coaching and later years ==
After his playing career ended, he returned to Fresno State to obtain his teaching credential. He began his teaching and coaching career at Caruthers and Kingsburg High Schools. His 1953 Kingsburg team included Rafer Johnson and Monte Clark. He was then the head football coach at Fresno's Edison High School from 1955 to 1966. He remained as Edison's athletic director until 1981. He died in 2000 at age 77.
