= Bill Boedeker =

American football player (1924–2014)

No. 21, 31, 99
- Position: Halfback

Personal information
- Born: March 7, 1924; Milwaukee, Wisconsin, U.S.
- Died: March 21, 2014 (aged 90); Fort Wayne, Indiana, U.S.
- Listed height: 5 ft 11 in (1.80 m)
- Listed weight: 192 lb (87 kg)

Career information
- High school: Fort Wayne (IN) North Side
- College: DePaul

Career history
- Chicago Rockets (1946); Cleveland Browns (1947–1949); Green Bay Packers (1950); Philadelphia Eagles (1950)

Awards and highlights
- 3× AAFC champion (1947, 1948, 1949)

Career statistics
- Rushing att-yards: 173–741
- Receptions-yards: 38–875
- Touchdowns: 14
- Stats at Pro Football Reference

William Henry Boedeker, Jr. (March 7, 1924 – March 21, 2014) was a halfback in the All-America Football Conference (AAFC) and National Football League (NFL) who played for the Chicago Rockets, the Cleveland Browns, the Philadelphia Eagles and the Green Bay Packers.

A graduate of North Side High School in Fort Wayne, Indiana, Boedeker entered the U.S. Army after high school but was sent to train at DePaul University in Chicago. At DePaul, he played basketball on successful teams with George Mikan before serving in World War II. When Boedeker returned from the service, he signed in 1946 to play football for the Rockets. He was traded to Cleveland in 1947 and spent three seasons there. The Browns won the AAFC championship each of those years. Boedeker was then sent to the Packers and the Eagles in 1950. He retired after the season.

== Early life and college ==
Born in Milwaukee, Wisconsin, Boedeker grew up in Fort Wayne, Indiana and attended the city's North Side High School. He enlisted in the United States Army immediately after graduating from high school in 1942 and was sent to a military program at DePaul University in Chicago. At DePaul he played on several successful basketball teams alongside George Mikan, including a freshman team that won 17 of 18 games in the 1942–1943 season. Boedeker was awarded a Bronze Star Medal and a Purple Heart during World War II.

== Professional football career ==
Returning after three years of service, Boedeker planned to return to DePaul to play basketball, but was first given a tryout to play for the Chicago Rockets in the All-America Football Conference (AAFC) in 1946. He had not played football in college and had a piece of shrapnel in his leg from the war, but a DePaul coach recommended him to the Rockets nevertheless. Boedeker made the team, making him the first person from Fort Wayne to play professional football. He stayed in Chicago for one year before being traded to the AAFC's Cleveland Browns for end John Harrington and tackle Jim Daniell.

Boedeker played as a halfback in Cleveland as part of a rushing attack that featured Marion Motley and Edgar Jones. He was also a kick returner. Paul Brown, the head coach of the Browns, called him "one of the most reckless runners who ever played for us and a terror when he ran back kicks". Cleveland finished the 1947 season with a 12–1–1 record with Boedeker in the backfield and beat the New York Yankees in the AAFC championship game. The team finished the 1948 season with a perfect record, winning all of its games and another championship. A third championship followed in 1949, but the AAFC dissolved after the season and the Browns were absorbed into the more established National Football League (NFL). Boedeker continued his college studies at Kalamazoo College between seasons with the Browns.

Boedeker's reckless running style earned him praise but also caused frequent injury. Brown said in 1949 that it was not carelessness but a "special kind of talent". Boedeker moved in 1950 to the NFL's Green Bay Packers and later in the season was sent to the Philadelphia Eagles. He left football after the season.

== Later life ==
Boedeker earned a Bachelor of Science degree from Wayne State University in Detroit, Michigan and a degree in engineering from DePaul. He settled in Fort Wayne after his football career. He worked in the 1950s as a sales director at Capehart-Farnsworth Corporation. In the 1960s, he was an executive at a television distribution firm in Fort Wayne. He died two weeks after his 90th birthday in March 2014.
