= 1947 New York Yankees (AAFC) season =

American football team season

- Owner: Dan Topping
- Head coach: Ray Flaherty
- Home stadium: Yankee Stadium

Results
- Record: 11–2–1
- Division place: 1st AAFC East
- Playoffs: Lost AAFC Championship (vs. Browns) 3–14

The 1947 New York Yankees season was their second in the All-America Football Conference. The team improved on their previous output of 10-3-1, winning eleven games. For the second consecutive season, they lost to the Cleveland Browns in the AAFC Championship.

The team's statistical leaders included Spec Sanders with 1,442 passing yards, 1,432 rushing yards, and 114 points scored, and Jack Russell with 368 receiving yards.

== Season schedule ==
Game	Date	Opponent	Result	Record	Venue	Attendance	Recap	Sources
1	August 31	at **Buffalo Bills**	**L** 24–28	0–1	Civic Stadium	32,385	Recap	
2	September 5	Chicago Rockets	**W** 48–26	1–1	Yankee Stadium	36,777	Recap	
3	September 12	at Los Angeles Dons	**W** 30–14	2–1	L.A. Memorial Coliseum	82,675	Recap	
4	September 21	at San Francisco 49ers	**W** 21–16	3–1	Kezar Stadium	52,819	Recap	
5	September 28	at **Baltimore Colts**	**W** 21–7	4–1	Municipal Stadium	51,583	Recap	
6	October 5	at Cleveland Browns	**L** 17–26	4–2	Cleveland Municipal Stadium	80,067	Recap	
7	October 12	**Brooklyn Dodgers**	**W** 31–7	5–2	Yankee Stadium	21,882	Recap	
—	Bye							
8	October 24	at Chicago Rockets	**W** 28–7	6–2	Soldier Field	20,310	Recap	
9	November 2	**Baltimore Colts**	**W** 35–21	7–2	Yankee Stadium	21,714	Recap	
10	November 9	San Francisco 49ers	**W** 24–16	8–2	Yankee Stadium	37,342	Recap	
11	November 16	Los Angeles Dons	**W** 16–13	9–2	Yankee Stadium	37,625	Recap	
12	November 23	Cleveland Browns	**T** 28–28	9–2–1	Yankee Stadium	70,060	Recap	
13	November 30	**Buffalo Bills**	**W** 35–13	10–2–1	Yankee Stadium	39,012	Recap	
14	December 7	at **Brooklyn Dodgers**	**W** 20–17	11–2–1	Ebbets Field	14,166	Recap	
Note: Intra-division opponents are in **bold** text.

== Playoffs ==
Round	Date	Opponent	Result	Venue	Attendance	Recap	Sources
Championship	December 14	Cleveland Browns	L 3–14	Yankee Stadium	61,879	Recap	

== Division standings ==
AAFC Eastern Division
	W	L	T	PCT	DIV	PF	PA	STK
New York Yankees	11	2	1	.846	5–1	378	239	W2
Buffalo Bills	8	4	2	.667	4–1–1	320	288	T1
Brooklyn Dodgers	3	10	1	.231	1–4–1	181	340	L3
Baltimore Colts	2	11	1	.154	1–5	167	377	L1

Note: Tie games were not officially counted in the standings.

== Roster ==
1947 New York Yankees final roster
Backs: 83 Harry Burrus CB/RB; 70 Bob Kennedy FB/LB; 73 Dewey Proctor FB/LB; 72 Eddie Prokop FB/LB; 88 Ben Raimondi RB; 74 Harmon Rowe CB; 81 Spec Sanders RB/CB/P; 75 John Sylvester RB/CB; 80 Bob Sweiger S/RB; 87 Lowell Wagner RB/CB; 76 Buddy Young FB; Ends/Receivers: 51 Bruce Alford; 55 Van Davis; 57 Roy Kurrasch; 52 Ollie Poole; 50 Roy Ruskusky; 53 Jack Russell; 56 Hank Stanton	Linemen/Linebackers: 31 Dick Barwegen G/DG; 33 Roman Bentz G/DG; 60 Lloyd Cheatham LB/FB; 41 Jack Durishan G; 21 Paul Duke C/LB; 45 Chuck Elliott T/DT; 61 Harvey Johnson LB/K; 43 Nate Johnson T/DT; 44 Bruiser Kinard DT/T; 46 Ted Ossowski T/DT; 40 Derrell Palmer T; 35 Charley Riffle DG; 42 Vic Schleich T/DT; 30 Ed Sharkey G/DG; 25 Lou Sossamon C/LB; 22 Ralph Stewart C/LB; 32 Joe Yackanich G/DG; rookies in italics
