= Stan Lewis (American football) =

American football player (born 1953)

No. 75
- Position: Defensive end

Personal information
- Born: September 11, 1953 (age 73); Chicago, Illinois, U.S.
- Listed height: 6 ft 4 in (1.93 m)
- Listed weight: 240 lb (109 kg)

Career information
- High school: Fenger
- College: Wayne State (NE)
- NFL draft: 1975: 10th round, 238th overall pick

Career history
- Cleveland Browns (1975); Seattle Seahawks (1976)*; Washington Redskins (1977)*; Minnesota Vikings (1977)*; Saskatchewan Roughriders (1977)
- * Offseason or practice squad member only
- Stats at Pro Football Reference

Stanley Lewis (born September 11, 1953) is an American former professional football player who was a defensive end for the Cleveland Browns of the National Football League (NFL). He played college football for the Wayne State (NE).
