= Sam Vacanti =

American football player (1922–1981)

No. 69, 62, 67
- Position: Quarterback

Personal information
- Born: March 20, 1922; Omaha, Nebraska, U.S.
- Died: December 17, 1981 (aged 59); Omaha, Nebraska, U.S.
- Listed height: 5 ft 11 in (1.80 m)
- Listed weight: 203 lb (92 kg)

Career information
- High school: Omaha Tech
- College: Iowa (1942); Purdue (1943); Nebraska (1946)
- NFL draft: 1945: 21st round, 218th overall pick

Career history
- Chicago Rockets (1947–1948); Baltimore Colts (1948–1949)

Awards and highlights
- Second-team All-Big Six (1946)

Career AAFC statistics
- Passing attempts: 368
- Passing completions: 154
- Completion percentage: 41.8%
- TD–INT: 18–32
- Passing yards: 2,338
- Passer rating: 43.5
- Stats at Pro Football Reference

Samuel Filadelfo Vacanti (March 20, 1922 – December 17, 1981) was an American professional football player who was a quarterback in the All-America Football Conference (AAFC).

Vacanti was born in Omaha, Nebraska, in 1922 and attended Omaha Tech High School. He played college football at the University of Iowa (1941–1942), Purdue University (1943), and the University of Nebraska–Lincoln (1946). He led Purdue to the 1943 Big Ten championship. He missed the 1944 and 1945 seasons while serving in the United States Marine Corps during World War II.

He played in the AAFC for the Chicago Rockets and Baltimore Colts from 1947 to 1949. He appeared in 39 professional football games, 16 of them as a starter, and totaled 2,338 passing yards.

He rejoined the Marines during the Korean War and attained the rank of major. He served on the Omaha City Council from 1965 to 1969 and worked as a life insurance agent. He died in 1981 in Omaha.
