= Lew Mayne =

American football player (1920–2013)

No. 86
- Position: Halfback

Personal information
- Born: March 21, 1920; Cuero, Texas, U.S.
- Died: October 24, 2013 (aged 93); Daingerfield, Texas, U.S.
- Listed height: 6 ft 1 in (1.85 m)
- Listed weight: 190 lb (86 kg)

Career information
- High school: Cuero
- College: University of Texas at Austin

Career history
- Brooklyn Dodgers (1946); Cleveland Browns (1947); Baltimore Colts (1948)

Awards and highlights
- AAFC champion (1947)

Career statistics
- Rushing yards: 292
- Receiving yards: 280
- Stats at Pro Football Reference

Lewis Elwood "Mickey" Mayne (March 21, 1920 – October 24, 2013) was an American football halfback who played three seasons in the All-America Football Conference (AAFC) between 1946 and 1948. Mayne played for the Brooklyn Dodgers, Cleveland Browns and Baltimore Colts.

From Cuero, Texas, Mayne was a standout athlete starting in junior high school. He excelled in track and field, but was also a football star in high school. Mayne continued to play football at the University of Texas at Austin; his Texas team won the Southwest Conference in 1942 and was selected to play in the Cotton Bowl the following year, Texas's first-ever bowl appearance. During his senior year, Mayne was called up for service in World War II.

Mayne was discharged in 1946 and signed with the Dodgers. He moved to Cleveland in 1947, when the team won the AAFC championship. Limited by injuries, he retired after spending the 1948 season with the Colts. After his playing career, Mayne became a high school coach and administrator in Texas, working at schools in Winnsboro and Daingerfield. He was inducted into his Cuero High School's hall of fame in 2006. Daingerfield renamed its football stadium Mickey Mayne Tiger Stadium in his honor in 2009.

== High school and college career ==
Growing up in Cuero, Texas, Mayne first showed athletic promise in junior high school, when he won four events at a track meet in Yoakum, Texas. He became a star football player at Cuero High School, and was selected to the Houston Post's All-Southeast Texas Class B team in his junior and senior years. He was described as the "Cuero crusher", a back who could also pass the ball and kick. Mayne, who was nicknamed "Mugge" in high school, played in a North-South Texas all-star game at the end of his senior season. Cuero reached the regional playoffs that year, but lost 19–10 to Junction High School despite a 15-yard field goal and 95-yard touchdown return by Mayne.

After graduating, Mayne enrolled at the University of Texas at Austin, where he played football and ran track and got the nickname "Mickey". Under head coach Dana X. Bible, Mayne and the Texas Longhorns won the Southwest Conference in 1942 and made their first-ever bowl appearance the following year, beating Georgia Tech 14–7 in the Cotton Bowl. Mayne met his wife, Nollie, in a geology class at Texas. In his senior year, he left the school to serve in the military during World War II. He was sent for training to Lincoln Air Base in Nebraska and played on the station's service football team, the Wings. He later moved for pilot training to Austin, Texas.

== Professional career ==
Mayne was discharged in 1946. He got offers to play football for the Chicago Bears of the National Football League and the Brooklyn Dodgers of the All-America Football Conference. Mayne chose the Dodgers and played for the team for one season, during which he scored three touchdowns and intercepted four passes. Mayne again entertained an offer to play for the Bears in 1947, and agreed to switch leagues after talking to team owner George Halas. Mayne, however, was offered $3,000 more, plus a $500 bonus, by the AAFC's Cleveland Browns. After getting Halas's blessing, Mayne signed with Cleveland.

Mayne did not play in the first few games of the 1947 season because of injuries and an infection, but head coach Paul Brown made him the starter at right halfback in October. The Browns finished the year with a 12–1–1 record and beat the New York Yankees to win the AAFC championship. Mayne spent a final year with the Baltimore Colts in 1948 before retiring from football. He suffered a separated shoulder during the season, and was bothered by a two-year-old injury that turned out to be a bruised spinal cord.

== Later life and coaching career ==
After his playing career, Mayne coached football and track and field at Winnsboro High School in Winnsboro, Texas and later at Daingerfield High School in Daingerfield, Texas. At Daingerfield, Mayne taught history and guided his track and field team to a state championship in 1962. He was the principal at the town's junior high and high school and later became the district superintendent before retiring in 1982. His wife Nollie died in 2004. The couple had three children. Mayne was inducted into Cuero High School's hall of fame in 2006. Daingerfield High School renamed its stadium Mickey Mayne Tiger Stadium in 2009 in his honor. He died in 2013.
