= Chuck Fenenbock =

American gridiron football player (1918–1998)

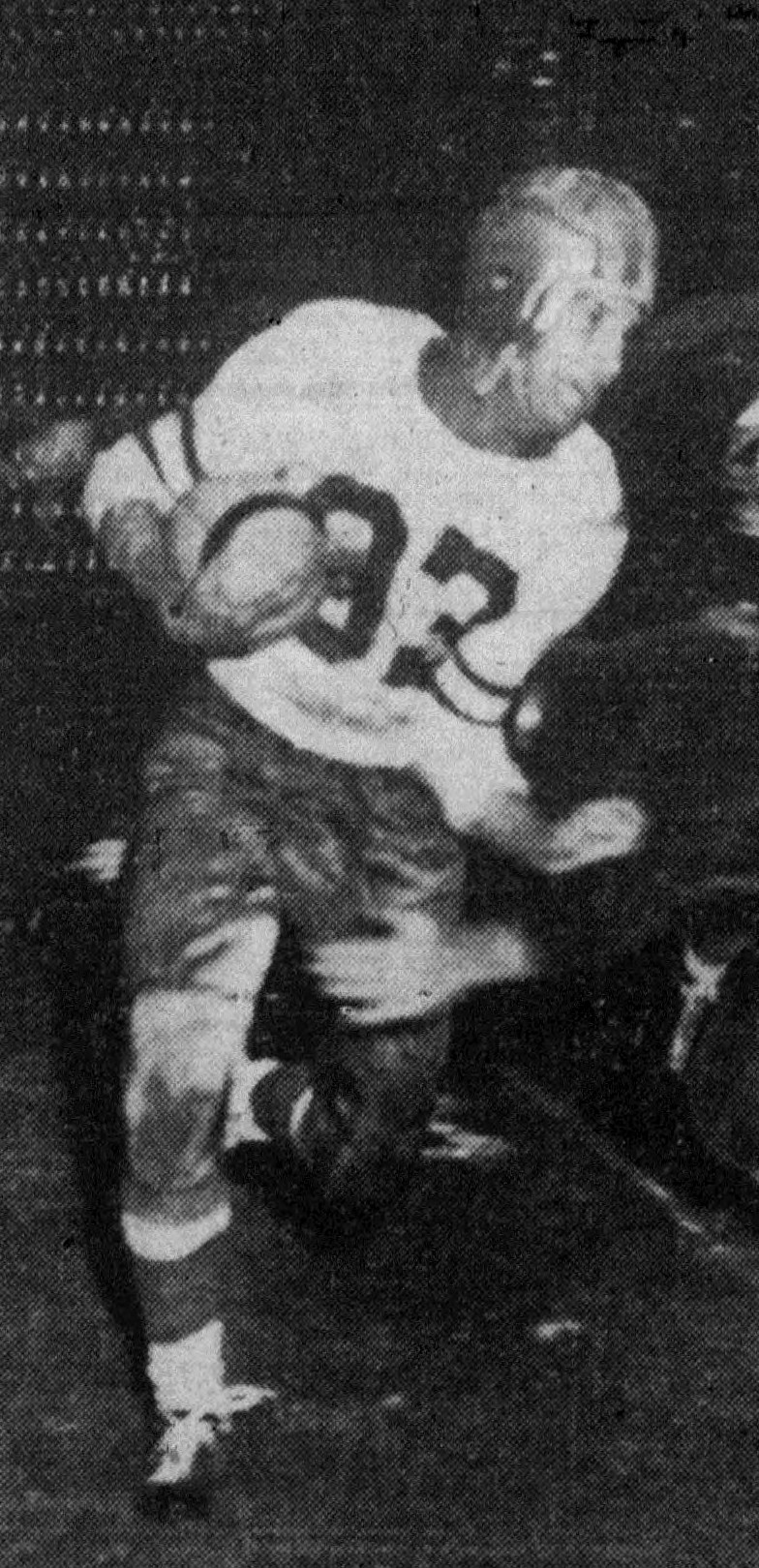
- Fenenbock in 1947 as a member of the Los Angeles Dons.

No. 48, 93, 86
- Position: Running back

Personal information
- Born: August 28, 1918; Oakland, California, U.S.
- Died: July 27, 1998 (aged 79); Santa Rosa, California, U.S.
- Listed height: 5 ft 9 in (1.75 m)
- Listed weight: 174 lb (79 kg)

Career information
- High school: Pittsburg (CA)
- College: UCLA

Career history
- San Diego Bombers (1941); Los Angeles Bulldogs (1942); Detroit Lions (1943); El Toro Marines (1944); Detroit Lions (1945); Los Angeles Dons (1946–1947); Chicago Rockets (1948); Edmonton Eskimos (1949); Calgary Stampeders (1950)

Awards and highlights
- AAFC punt return yards leader (1946)
- Stats at Pro Football Reference

Charles Bernard Fenenbock (August 28, 1918 – July 27, 1998) was an American football player who starred in college at UCLA, and professionally in the Pacific Coast Professional Football League (PCPFL), National Football League (NFL), All-America Football Conference (AAFC), and Western Interprovincial Football Union (WIFU). Notably he was a running back for the Detroit Lions in the NFL, and for the Los Angeles Dons in the AAFC where he led the league in numerous offensive categories.

== Starring at UCLA ==
A highly recruited multi sport athlete out of Pittsburg High School in Northern California, Fenenbock chose to play football at UCLA.

He starred as UCLA's single wing tailback in 1938 and 1939. He was celebrated for his exiting breakaway runs as well as for his passing skills.

On January 1, 1939 Fenenbock was named MVP in the inaugural Pineapple Bowl played in Honolulu.

Following the 1938 season he was named to several All American teams .

At UCLA Fenenbock played alongside such greats as Kenny Washington, Jackie Robinson, Woody Strode and Burr Baldwin.

== Professional football ==
In 1941 he starred with the San Diego Bombers in the Pacific Coast Professional Football League (PCPFL).

In 1942 he was the single wing tailback for the renowned Los Angeles Bulldogs in the PCPFL.

He was named MVP of the 1942 PCPFL All Star game.

=== Detroit Lions ===
Fenenbock starred for the NFL Detroit Lions in 1943 and 1945. As the Lions single wing tailback Fenenbock finished near the top of NFL statistics in a number of categories.

He was named to several All Pro lists. During the 1943 season Fenenbock played a big part in turning around Detroit's NFL franchise.

In 1944 Fenenbock starred for the acclaimed El Toro Marine Corps football team

In 1945 he returned from military to lead the Detroit Lions to an excellent season.

=== Los Angeles Dons ===
In 1946 and 1947 Fenenbock played for the Los Angeles Dons in the newly formed All America Football Conference.

Led the AAFC in yards per carry in 1946 averaging a stunning 13.5 yards per carry and was second in yards per carry in 1947.

Fenenbock was the AAFC's top kick and punt returner 1946-1948.

With the Dons he played halfback in the new T-formation adopted by professional football.

Fenenbock was acclaimed, along with Buddy Young, as the AAFC's top speedster and breakaway runner.

Famed Cleveland Browns coach Paul Brown called Fenenbock the player he most feared in the AAFC.

=== Chicago Rockets ===
In 1948 Fenenbock was traded to the Chicago Rockets in the AAFC.

That year, he led the Rockets in most offensive categories. Fenenbock was the Rockets best player and had a spectacular game in his return to his hometown of Los Angeles to play the Dons.

=== Western Interprovincial Football Union ===
With the merger of the AAFC with the NFL in 1949 many AAFC stars jumped to the Western Interprovincial Football Union in Canada. In 1949 Fenenbock started with the Edmonton Eskimos.

Fenenbock played his last season in 1950 with the Calgary Stampeders.

== Other details ==
His small stature, powerful build, and blazing speed meant Fenenbock would always carry the nickname Mighty Mouse.

In 2000 Fenenbock's son, Michael, published a book about him. Fireworks Every Time He Touches The Ball: A Chronicle of Chuck Fenenbock's Football Career. Maxfilms Publishing 2000.

== Later career ==
Following his playing days, Fenenbock became a successful coach. Most notably at:

- St. Paul High School in Santa Fe Springs, California.
- Anaheim Rhinos professional football team.
- Hawaiian Warriors and the Portland Loggers Football Club in the Continental Football League
