= New York Yankees (AAFC) =

American football team from 1946 to 1949

Logo

General information
- Founded: 1946
- Folded: 1949 (merged with Brooklyn Dodgers in 1949)
- Stadium: Yankee Stadium
- Headquartered: New York, New York, United States
- Colors: Blue, White, Silver

Personnel
- Owner: Dan Topping
- Head coach: Ray Flaherty (1946–1948); Red Strader (1948–1949)

Team history
- New York Yankees (1946–1948); Brooklyn-New York Yankees (1949)

League / conference affiliations
- All-America Football Conference (1946–1949)

The New York Yankees were a professional American football team that played in the All-America Football Conference (AAFC) from 1946 to 1949. The team played in Yankee Stadium in the Bronx. They were owned by Dan Topping, who transferred the team from the NFL Brooklyn Dodgers, retaining many of the same players. The team's coach was Ray Flaherty, who had coached the Washington Redskins in the early 1940s. Former NFL player Jim Barber served as an assistant coach under Flaherty.

The Yankees appeared in the 1946 AAFC championship game, but lost to the Cleveland Browns by a score of 14–9. The same two teams appeared in the championship game the following year, with the Browns winning again 14–3.

Before the 1949 season, the financially-faltering Brooklyn Dodgers football team was folded and merged into the Yankees, which became the Brooklyn-New York Yankees, but this was the final season of the AAFC, which was then absorbed by the NFL. The Yankees players were divided between the New York Giants and New York Bulldogs, who played as the New York Yanks starting in 1950.

== Players of note ==
- Brad Ecklund
- Nate Johnson
- Ace Parker
- Jack Russell
- Spec Sanders
- Otto Schnellbacher
- Frank Sinkwich
- Bob Sweiger
- Jordan Jenkins
- George Brown

== Pro Football Hall of Famers ==
New York Yankees Hall of Famers
Players
No.	Name	Position	Tenure	Inducted
44	Bruiser Kinard	T	1946–1947	1971
88	Ace Parker	QB/HB	1946	1972
44	Arnie Weinmeister	DT	1948–1949	1984
49	Tom Landry	CB, P, QB, RB	1949	1990
Coaches
Name		Position	Tenure	Inducted
Ray Flaherty		Head coach	1946–1948	1976

== Season records ==
Season records
Season	W	L	T	Finish	Playoff results
New York Yankees
1946	10	3	1	1st AAFC East	Lost to Cleveland, 14–9, in AAFC Championship Game
1947	11	2	1	1st AAFC East	Lost to Cleveland, 14–3, in AAFC Championship Game
1948	6	8	0	3rd AAFC East	Did not qualify
Brooklyn-New York Yankees
1949	8	4	0	3rd AAFC	Lost to San Francisco, 17–7, in AAFC Semifinal Playoffs
Totals	35	17	2		
