= 1948 Buffalo Bills season =

American football team season

1948 Buffalo Bills (AAFC) season
- Poster for the September 26 game
- Head coach: Red Dawson
- Home stadium: Civic Stadium

Results
- Record: 7–7
- Division place: 1st AAFC East
- Playoffs: Won Divisional Playoff (at Colts) 28–17; Lost AAFC Championship (at Browns) 7–49

The 1948 Buffalo Bills season was their third in the All-America Football Conference (AAFC). The team failed to improve on their previous output of 8-4-2, winning only seven games. They qualified for the playoffs for the first time in franchise history, but lost to the Cleveland Browns in the AAFC Championship.

The team's statistical leaders included George Ratterman with 2,577 passing yards, Chet Mutryn with 823 rushing yards and 96 points scored, and Al Baldwin with 916 receiving yards.

== Season schedule ==
Game	Date	Opponent	Result	Record	Venue	Recap	Sources
1	August 29	at San Francisco 49ers	**L** 14–35	0–1	Kezar Stadium	Recap	
2	September 6	Chicago Rockets	**W** 42–7	1–1	Civic Stadium	Recap	
3	September 12	Cleveland Browns	**L** 13–42	1–2	Civic Stadium	Recap	
—	Bye						
4	September 26	San Francisco 49ers	**L** 28–38	1–3	Civic Stadium	Recap	
5	October 3	**Brooklyn Dodgers**	**W** 31–21	2–3	Civic Stadium	Recap	
6	October 10	**New York Yankees**	**L** 13–14	2–4	Civic Stadium	Recap	
7	October 17	at Cleveland Browns	**L** 14–31	2–5	Municipal Stadium	Recap	
8	October 24	at Los Angeles Dons	**W** 35–21	3–5	LA Memorial Coliseum	Recap	
9	October 31	**Baltimore Colts**	**W** 35–17	4–5	Civic Stadium	Recap	
10	November 7	at **Brooklyn Dodgers**	**W** 26–21	5–5	Ebbets Field	Recap	
11	November 14	Los Angeles Dons	**L** 20–27	5–6	Civic Stadium	Recap	
—	Bye						
12	November 25	at Chicago Rockets	**W** 39–35	6–6	Soldier Field	Recap	
13	November 28	at **New York Yankees**	**W** 35–14	7–6	Yankee Stadium	Recap	
14	December 5	at **Baltimore Colts**	**L** 15–35	7–7	Municipal Stadium	Recap	
Note: Intra-division opponents are in **bold** text. • Thanksgiving Day: November 25.

== Playoffs ==
Round	Date	Opponent	Result	Venue	Recap	Sources
Division	December 12	at Baltimore Colts	W 28–17	Municipal Stadium	Recap	
Championship	December 19	at Cleveland Browns	L 7–49	Cleveland Municipal Stadium	Recap	

== Division standings ==
AAFC Eastern Division
	W	L	T	PCT	DIV	PF	PA	STK
Buffalo Bills	7	7	0	.500	4–2	360	358	L1
Baltimore Colts	7	7	0	.500	5–1	333	327	W2
New York Yankees	6	8	0	.429	3–3	265	301	W1
Brooklyn Dodgers	2	12	0	.143	0–6	253	387	L6

Note: Tie games were not officially counted in the standings.

== Roster ==
1948 Buffalo Bills final roster
Quarterbacks: 61 George Ratterman; 63 Jim Still P/S; Running backs: 88 Bill Gompers CB; 72 Vic Kulbitski LB; 83 Chet Mutryn; 80 Bob Steuber CB/K; 87 Lou Tomasetti; Ends/Receivers: 50 Ed Balatti; 57 Al Baldwin; 52 Paul Gibson; 51 George Kisiday; 58 Vince Mazza; 54 Bill O'Connor	Linemen: 43 Graham Armstrong T/K; 45 Jack Carpenter DT/T; 46 John Kerns T/DT; 31 Ed King MG/G; 47 John Kissell DT/T; 32 Hal Lahar G/MG; 30 Rocco Pirro G/MG; 21 Felto Prewitt C/LB; 37 Vince Scott MG/G; 22 Art Statuto C; 40 Jerry Whalen G	Linebackers: 26 Bob Callahan OLB; 73 Ed Hirsch OLB/FB; 74 Carl Schuette OLB/S; 33 John Wyhonic MLB; Defensive backs: 90 Al Akins CB/RB; 82 Rex Bumgardner CB/RB; 81 Chick Maggioli S/RB; 89 Don Schneider S/RB; 82 Alex Wizbicki CB; Special teams: Bob Stefik K; Reserve: 53 Marty Comer DE/WR (IR); rookies in italics
