= All-America Football Conference playoffs =

- Modern rendition of league logo
- Sport: American football
- Founded: 1944
- First season: 1946
- Folded: 1949
- No. of teams: 2 (1946, 1947); 3 (1948); 4 (1949)
- Country: United States
- Last champion: Cleveland Browns (1946–1949)

The All-America Football Conference playoffs were the postseason games of the All-America Football Conference (AAFC), an American football league which challenged the established National Football League (NFL) from 1946 to 1949.

From 1946 to 1948, the AAFC determined its champion in a title game between the winners of its two divisions. In 1948, a special playoff game was needed to break a first-place tie in one of the divisions. In 1949, the league contracted to a single division, so it determined its champion by a four-team single-elimination tournament.

Just five teams participated in the AAFC playoffs in four years: the Cleveland Browns (all four years), the New York Yankees (three times), the Buffalo Bills (twice), the Baltimore Colts, and the San Francisco 49ers. The Cleveland Browns won all four AAFC titles, however their domination and the lack of balance that it demonstrated ultimately hurt the league by diminishing attendance.

AAFC playoff records, as with AAFC records in general, are recognized by the Pro Football Hall of Fame but were not included in the NFL's record book until 2025.

== 1946 ==
=== Championship game ===
Cleveland Browns 14, New York Yankees 9

| Quarter | 1 | 2 | 3 | 4 | Total |
|---|---|---|---|---|---|
| Yankees | 3 | 0 | 6 | 0 | 9 |
| Browns | 0 | 7 | 0 | 7 | 14 |

at Cleveland Municipal Stadium, Cleveland, Ohio

- Date: December 22, 1946
- Game attendance: 41,181
- Pro-Football-Reference.com

Game information
- First quarter
  - NY – Harvey Johnson 21-yard field goal. Yanks 3–0
- Second quarter
  - CLE – Marion Motley 2-yard rush (Groza kick). Browns 7–3
- Third quarter
  - NY – Spec Sanders 2-yard rush (kick blocked). Yanks 9–7
- Fourth quarter
  - CLE – Dante Lavelli 16-yard pass from Otto Graham (Groza kick). Browns 14–9

Top passers

- NY – Ace Parker – 8/18, 81 yards, 1 INT
- CLE – Otto Graham – 16/27, 213 yards, 1 TD, 1 INT

Top rushers

- NY – Spec Sanders – 14 rushes, 55 yards, 1 TD
- CLE – Marion Motley – 13 rushes, 98 yards, 1 TD

Top receivers

- NY – Jack Russell – 5 receptions, 58 yards
- CLE – Dante Lavelli – 6 receptions, 87 yards

The two teams had met twice in the regular season, with Cleveland (12–2) defeating the Yankees (10–3–1) both times by scores of 24–7 on September 26 in Cleveland and 7–0 on October 12 at Yankee Stadium. On what was described as a chilly day of 29-degree weather, the Yankees nearly defied the expectations as 14-point underdogs to lead for most of the fourth quarter on the strength of making a field goal (while Cleveland went 0-for-4 with two kickers) and a touchdown run by Spec Sanders. With less than five minutes remaining in the game, the Browns were trailing 9-7 before Otto Graham led Cleveland to a 76-yard drive that culminated with a pass to Dante Lavelli that saw him catch it and run in from the six-yard line to the endzone to give them the lead with 4:13 remaining to give Cleveland the lead they would not relinquish. The Yankees tried to drive down the field, but Ace Parker was intercepted by Graham (playing safety) to clinch the championship for Cleveland.

This was the final game for Ace Parker, who retired after the game ended.

Individual shares for Cleveland players were $931. While the AAFC never instituted a trophy for winning the championship (instead giving a lapel pin), the Cleveland players pooled together to commission two trophies: one was given to team majority owner Arthur B. McBride and the other was given to minority owner Daniel Sherby; included was the names of all 38 players. These two trophies are the only ones of a Cleveland football championship to exist (the four NFL championships won by Cleveland were in the era where the trophy was given on a rotating basis; they had a replica trophy created for the 1964 championship decades later); one of the trophies was donated to the organization in 2013 after the grandson of Sherby discovered the trophy in a box in his garage in Raleigh, North Carolina.

=== Starting lineup ===
Note: Players often played both offense and defense in this period. Although free substitution existed from 1943, what are today considered defensive starters were categorized as "substitutes" in this era. Pro Football Reference lists Lloyd Cheatham as under the "BB position", although Ace Parker, who is not listed as starting in the game, threw all but two passes (with Spec Sanders throwing those passes) for the team.

Hall of Fame inductee

| New York | Position | Cleveland |
|---|---|---|
Lineup
| Lloyd Cheatham | QB | Otto Graham |
| Eddie Prokop | FB | Marion Motley |
| Spec Sanders | LH | Edgar Jones |
| Lowell Wagner | RH | Don Greenwood |
| Bruce Alford | RE | Dante Lavelli |
| Jack Russell | LE | Mac Speedie |
| Bruiser Kinard | LT | Ernie Blandin |
| Jack Baldwin | LG | Ed Ulinski |
| Tom Robertson | C | Mike Scarry |
| Charley Riffle | RG | Lin Houston |
| Nate Johnson | RT | Lou Rymkus |
Head coach
| Ray Flaherty | | Paul Brown |

=== Statistics ===
| Statistics | Yankees | Browns |
|---|---|---|
| First downs | 10 | 18 |
| Rushing yards | 65 | 112 |
| Yards per carry | 2.2 | 3.0 |
| Passing yards | 81 | 213 |
| Total yards | 146 | 325 |
| Fumbles-Lost | 2–1 | 3–0 |
| Turnovers | 2 | 1 |
| Penalties-Yards | 4–20 | 5–25 |

== 1947 ==
=== Championship game ===
Cleveland Browns 14, New York Yankees 3

| Quarter | 1 | 2 | 3 | 4 | Total |
|---|---|---|---|---|---|
| Browns | 7 | 0 | 7 | 0 | 14 |
| Yankees | 0 | 3 | 0 | 0 | 3 |

at Yankee Stadium, New York, New York

- Date: December 14, 1947
- Game attendance: 61,879
- Pro-Football-Reference.com

Game information
- First quarter
  - CLE – Otto Graham 1-yard rush (Lou Groza kick). Browns 7–0
- Second quarter
  - NY – Harvey Johnson 12-yard field goal. Browns 7–3
- Third quarter
  - CLE – Edgar Jones 4-yard rush (Lou Saban kick). Browns 14–3

Top passers

- CLE – Otto Graham – 14/21, 112 yards
- NY – Spec Sanders – 7/17, 89 yards, 1 INT

Top rushers

- CLE – Marion Motley – 13 rushes, 109 yards
- NY – Buddy Young – 16 rushes, 69 yards

Top receivers

- CLE – Dante Lavelli – 3 receptions, 37 yards
- NY – Buddy Young – 2 receptions, 25 yards

The two teams had met twice in the regular season: Cleveland (12–1–1) defeated New York (11–2–1) at home on October 5 by a score of 26–17 while the two teams tied in the November 23 matchup in New York. In weather conditions that saw the field have bits of ice and snow for a slippery feel (the infield portion of Municipal Stadium was frozen solid), the two teams mutually agreed to only wear regulation cleats rather than sneakers. Cleveland's T-formation offense against New York's single-wing formation saw the two teams combine for 17 points of offense. Marion Motley had a 100-yard rushing game for Cleveland, who never trailed. Cleveland players took $1,191.99 each for their share, while Yankee players received $794.66 each.

=== Starting lineup ===
Hall of Fame inductee

| Cleveland | Position | New York |
|---|---|---|
Lineup
| Otto Graham | QB/TB | Spec Sanders |
| Marion Motley | FB | Buddy Young |
| Cliff Lewis | LH / WB | Bob Sweiger |
| Tommy Colella | RH / BB | Lloyd Cheatham |
| George Young | LE | Jack Russell |
| Lou Groza | LT | Bruiser Kinard |
| Ed Ulinski | LG | Roman Bentz |
| Lou Saban | C | Lou Sossamon |
| Bill Willis | RG | Dick Barwegen |
| Chet Adams | RT | Nate Johnson |
| John Yonakor | RE | Bruce Alford |
Head coach
| Paul Brown | | Ray Flaherty |

=== Statistics ===
| Statistics | Browns | Yankees |
|---|---|---|
| First downs | 15 | 13 |
| Rushing yards | 172 | 123 |
| Yards Per Carry | 5.2 | 3.7 |
| Passing Yds | 137 | 112 |
| Sack Yds Lost | 25 | 23 |
| Net Passing Yards | 112 | 89 |
| Total yards | 309 | 235 |
| Fumbles-Lost | 2–1 | 3–2 |
| Turnovers | 1 | 3 |
| Penalties-Yards | 7–45 | 3–21 |

== 1948 ==
=== Division playoff ===
Buffalo Bills 28, Baltimore Colts 17

| Quarter | 1 | 2 | 3 | 4 | Total |
|---|---|---|---|---|---|
| Bills | 0 | 7 | 0 | 21 | 28 |
| Colts | 3 | 0 | 14 | 0 | 17 |

at Baltimore Memorial Stadium, Baltimore, Maryland

- Date: December 12, 1948
- Game attendance: 27,325
- Pro-Football-Reference.com

Game information
- First quarter
  - BAL – Rex Grossman Sr. 16-yard field goal. Colts 3–0
- Second quarter
  - BUF – Bill O'Connor 8-yard pass from George Ratterman (Graham Armstrong kick). Bills 7–3
- Third quarter
  - BAL – Bus Mertes 8-yard rush (Grossman kick). Colts 10–7
  - BAL – Bus Mertes 1-yard rush (Grossman kick). Colts 17–7
- Fourth quarter
  - BUF – Bill Gompers 66-yard pass from George Ratterman (Armstrong kick). Colts 17–14
  - BUF – Al Baldwin 25-yard pass from George Ratterman (Armstrong kick). Bills 21–17
  - BUF – Buckets Hirsch 19-yard interception return (Armstrong kick). Bills 28–17

Top passers

- BUF – George Ratterman– 10/18, 135 yards, 3 TD, 1 INT
- BAL – Y.A. Tittle – 17/36, 217 yards, 1 INT

Top rushers

- BUF – Lou Tomasetti – 12 rushes, 56 yards
- BAL – Bus Mertes – 15 rushes, 73 yards, 2 TD

Top receivers

- BUF – Bill Gompers – 1 reception, 66 yards
- BAL – Billy Hillenbrand – 7 receptions, 75 yards

The Bills and Colts were each tied for first in the Eastern Division with records of 7–7 due to the last game of the season, in which Baltimore defeated Buffalo 35–15 at Baltimore Municipal Stadium on December 5. One week later at the same venue, the Bills returned the favor and defeated Baltimore to reach the AAFC Championship Game, with George Ratterman tossing for two touchdowns in the span of three minutes to give Buffalo the lead after they trailed by ten to start the fourth. Buckets Hirsch closed the scoring with an interception return for a touchdown off Y. A. Tittle.

The Baltimore crowd was so unsatisfied by the calls of sideline judge Tommy Whelan that players and police were used to escort him to the dressing room when the game was over.

=== Championship game ===
Cleveland Browns 49, Buffalo Bills 7

| Quarter | 1 | 2 | 3 | 4 | Total |
|---|---|---|---|---|---|
| Bills | 0 | 0 | 7 | 0 | 7 |
| Browns | 7 | 7 | 14 | 21 | 49 |

at Cleveland Municipal Stadium, Cleveland, Ohio

- Date: December 19, 1948
- Game attendance: 22,981
- Referee: Samuel H. Giangreco
- Pro-Football-Reference.com

Game information
- First quarter
  - CLE – Edgar Jones 3-yard rush (Lou Groza kick). 0:10, Browns 7–0
- Second quarter
  - CLE – George Young 18-yard fumble return (Groza kick). 12:35, Browns 14–0
- Third quarter
  - CLE – Edgar Jones 9-yard pass from Otto Graham (Groza kick). 12:58, Browns 21–0
  - CLE – Marion Motley 29 run (Groza kick). 4:25, Browns 28–0 CLE
  - BUF – Al Baldwin 10-yard pass from Jim Still (Graham Armstrong kick). 0:10, Browns 28–7
- Fourth quarter
  - CLE – Marion Motley 31-yard rush (Groza kick). 14:16, Browns 35–7
  - CLE – Marion Motley 5-yard rush (Groza kick). 5:16, Browns 42–7
  - CLE – Lou Saban 39-yard interception return (Groza kick). 3:11, Browns 49–7

Top passers

- BUF – Jim Still – 6/18, 80 yards, 1 TD, 2 INT
- CLE – Otto Graham – 11/24, 118 yards, 1 TD, 1 INT

Top rushers

- BUF – Rex Bumgardner – 11 rushes, 34 yards
- CLE – Marion Motley – 14 rushes, 133 yards, 1 TD

Top receivers

- BUF – Bill O'Connor – 3 receptions, 41 yards
- CLE – Edgar Jones – 3 receptions, 39 yards, 1 TD

Cleveland had beaten Buffalo in both of the regular season matchups: 42–13 in Buffalo on September 12 and 31–14 on October 17 in Cleveland. Miserable weather that had snow fall on and off for a good portion of the day leading up to the game, combined with rumors of a merger with the NFL, led to less than 25,000 people attending the game. This was the first time the city of Buffalo had competed in a professional championship game and the first time a pro team was in championship discussion since the 1921 NFL Championship controversy 27 years earlier.

Edgar Jones opened the scoring for Cleveland with 0:10 seconds to go in the first quarter. Early in the second quarter, George Young recovered a Rex Bumgardner fumble at the 18-yard line and returned it to the end zone to give Cleveland a 14-0 lead that they held at halftime. Two minutes into the third quarter, Otto Graham delivered a touchdown pass to Edgar Jones to increase the score. Marion Motley increased the scoring with a 29-yard touchdown run. The Bills got their only score of the game when they replaced George Ratterman with Jim Still (already serving as punter) at quarterback, where he delivered a ten-yard touchdown pass with a few seconds to go in the third quarter. The fourth quarter saw two further Motley touchdown runs and a Lou Saban interception return for a touchdown to end the game. Cleveland, nursing a record of 14–0, thoroughly dominated the Bills here to complete the first perfect season by a football team since the Los Angeles Bulldogs of the third rendition of the American Football League in 1937 and retroactively is considered the first perfect season by a major professional team. The city of Buffalo would next compete for a professional championship game in 1964 with the American Football League.

The winner's share for each Cleveland player was $594.18 while each Buffalo player received $386.22.

=== Starting lineup ===
Note: Players often played both offense and defense in this period. Although free substitution existed from 1943, what are today considered defensive starters were categorized as "substitutes" in this era.

Hall of Fame inductee

| Buffalo | Position | Cleveland |
|---|---|---|
Lineup
| George Ratterman | QB | Otto Graham |
| Lou Tomasetti | FB | Marion Motley |
| Chet Mutryn | LH | Edgar Jones |
| Rex Bumgardner | RH | Dub Jones |
| Bill O'Connor | RE | Dante Lavelli |
| Al Baldwin | LE | Mac Speedie |
| Graham Armstrong | LT | Lou Groza |
| Hal Lahar | LG | Ed Ulinski |
| Art Statuto | C | Frank Gatski |
| Rocco Pirro | RG | Bob Gaudio |
| John Kerns | RT | Lou Rymkus |
Head coach
| Red Dawson | | Paul Brown |

=== Statistics ===
| Statistics | Bills | Browns |
|---|---|---|
| First downs | 13 | 20 |
| Rushing yards | 63 | 215 |
| Yards per carry | 1.9 | 5.3 |
| Passing yards | 104 | 118 |
| Total yards | 167 | 333 |
| Punts-Avg. | 6–42.5 | 3–32.7 |
| Fumbles-Lost | 3–3 | 6–3 |
| Turnovers | 8 | 4 |
| Penalties-Yards | 7–27 | 9–90 |

== 1949 ==
=== First-round games ===
==== Cleveland Browns vs. Buffalo Bills ====
Cleveland Browns 31, Buffalo Bills 21

| Quarter | 1 | 2 | 3 | 4 | Total |
|---|---|---|---|---|---|
| Bills | 0 | 14 | 7 | 0 | 21 |
| Browns | 10 | 0 | 14 | 7 | 31 |

at Municipal Stadium, Cleveland, Ohio

- Date: December 4, 1949
- Game attendance: 17,270
- Pro-Football-Reference.com

Game information
- First quarter
  - CLE – Dante Lavelli 51-yard pass from Otto Graham (Lou Groza kick). Browns 7–0
  - CLE – Lou Groza 31-yard field goal. Browns 10–0
  - BUF – Lou Tomasetti 4-yard pass from George Ratterman (Chet Adams kick). Browns 10–7
  - BUF – Chet Mutryn 8-yard pass from Ratterman (Chet Adams kick). Bills 14–10
  - CLE – Edgar Jones 2-yard run (Lou Groza kick). Browns 17–14
  - BUF – Chet Mutryn 30=yard pass from George Ratterman (Chet Adams kick). Bills 21–17
  - CLE – Dub Jones 49-yard pass from Otto Graham (Lou Groza kick). Browns 24–21
  - CLE – Warren Lahr 52-yard interception return (Lou Groza kick). Browns 31–21

Top passers

- BUF – George Ratterman – 21/39, 293 yards, 3 TD, 2 INT
- CLE – Otto Graham – 22/43 326 yards, 2 TD, 2 INT

Top rushers

- BUF – Rex Bumgardner – 10 rushes, 37 yards
- CLE – Marion Motley – 8 rushes, 38 yards

Top receivers

- BUF – Chet Mutryn – 6 receptions, 81 yards, 2 TD
- CLE – Mac Speedie – 7 receptions, 113 yards

The 9–1–2 Browns had both of their ties come at the hands of the 5–5–2 Bills, one in Buffalo to start the season on September 5 and the other in Cleveland on November 13. As it turned out, this was the final game played by the Bills, who would not be voted in alongside the Browns, 49ers and Baltimore Colts to play in the NFL for 1950. Buffalo would have to wait until 1960 with the new Buffalo Bills in the American Football League for professional football.

==== San Francisco 49ers vs. New York Yankees ====
San Francisco 49ers 17, New York Yankees 7

| Quarter | 1 | 2 | 3 | 4 | Total |
|---|---|---|---|---|---|
| Yankees | 0 | 7 | 0 | 0 | 7 |
| 49ers | 7 | 3 | 7 | 0 | 17 |

at Kezar Stadium, San Francisco, California

- Game attendance: 41,393
- Pro-Football-Reference.com

Game information
- First quarter
  - SF – Verl Lillywhite 40-yard rush (Joe Vetrano kick). 49ers 7–0
- Second quarter
  - NY – Sherman Howard 1 yard rush (Harvey Johnson kick). Tied 7–7
  - SF – Joe Vetrano 38-yard field goal. 49ers 10–7
- Third quarter
  - SF – Don Garlin 10-yard pass from Frankie Albert (Joe Vetrano kick). 49ers 17–7

Top passers

- NY – Don Panciera – 5/14, 94 yards, 1 INT
- SF – Frankie Albert – 8/17, 96 yards, 1 TD, 2 INT

Top rushers

- NY – Sherman Howard – 16 carries, 37 yards, 1 TD
- SF – Frankie Albert – 9 carries, 51 yards

Top receivers

- NY – Buddy Young –3 receptions, 56 yards
- SF – Sam Cathcart – 2 receptions, 30 yards

The matchup of the second-place 49ers (9–3) against the third-place Yankees (8–4) previously had seen the two teams split their regular season matchups: the Yankees beat the 49ers in New York on October 23 while the 49ers had defeated the Yankees on November 27 in San Francisco.

This was the final game played by the AAFC Yankees, who had been merged with the Brooklyn Dodgers for the 1949 season to keep afloat as the "Brooklyn-New York Yankees". The Yankees players would be dispersed among the two National Football League teams in New York in the New York Giants and New York Bulldogs, who rebranded to become the "New York Yanks" in 1950.

=== Championship game ===
Cleveland Browns 21, San Francisco 49ers 7

| Quarter | 1 | 2 | 3 | 4 | Total |
|---|---|---|---|---|---|
| 49ers | 0 | 0 | 0 | 7 | 7 |
| Browns | 7 | 0 | 7 | 7 | 21 |

at Cleveland Municipal Stadium, Cleveland, Ohio

- Date: December 11, 1949
- Game attendance: 22,550
- Referee: Thomas A. Timlin
- Pro-Football-Reference.com

Game information
- First quarter
  - CLE – Edgar Jones 2-yard rush (Lou Groza kick). Browns 7–0
- Third quarter
  - CLE – Marion Motley 63-yard rush (Groza kick). Browns 14–0
- Fourth quarter
  - SF – Paul Salata 23-yard pass from Frankie Albert (Joe Vetrano kick). Browns 14–7
  - CLE – Dub Jones 4-yard rush (Groza kick). Browns 21–7

Top passers

- SF – Frankie Albert – 9/24, 108 yards, 1 TD
- CLE – Otto Graham – 7/17, 128 yards

Top rushers

- SF – Frankie Albert – 5 rushes, 41 yards
- CLE – Marion Motley – 8 rushes, 75 yards, 1 TD

Top receivers

- SF – Paul Salata – 3 receptions, 37 yards, 1 TD
- CLE – Dante Lavelli – 4 receptions, 56 yards

The final AAFC Championship matched two teams that had finished 1-2 in all four AAFC seasons with Cleveland and San Francisco. The two teams split their regular season matchups: The 49ers defeated the Browns 56–28 in San Francisco on October 9 while the Browns defeated the 49ers 30–28 in Cleveland on October 30. On a field of mud and slush, the two teams managed to have zero turnovers and just one penalty combined. Likely the standout play of the game was Marion Motley scoring a 63-yard touchdown run on a trap play that saw him burst up the middle to give Cleveland a 14-0 lead in the third quarter. The 49ers did respond with a 74-yard drive in the fourth quarter that saw Frankie Albert throw a touchdown pass to Paul Salata. However, Dub Jones ran in for a four-yard touchdown that served as the final touchdown in AAFC history, with Lou Groza scoring the last point in league history on the PAT. Browns players received $266.11 each while 49ers players received $172.61 each.

==== Starting lineup ====
Hall of Fame inductee

| San Francisco | Position | Cleveland |
|---|---|---|
Lineup
| Frankie Albert | QB | Otto Graham |
| Norm Standlee | FB | Marion Motley |
| Len Eshmont | LH | Edgar Jones |
| Joe Perry | RH | Dub Jones |
| Alyn Beals | E | Dante Lavelli |
| Hal Shoener | LE | Mac Speedie |
| Bob Mike | LT | Lou Groza |
| Homer Hobbs | LG | Ed Ulinski |
| Bill Johnson | C | Frank Gatski |
| Visco Grgich | RG | Lin Houston |
| John Woudenberg | RT | Lou Rymkus |
Head coach
| Buck Shaw | | Paul Brown |

==== Statistics ====
| Statistics | 49ers | Browns |
|---|---|---|
| First downs | 14 | 16 |
| Rushing yards | 122 | 217 |
| Yards per carry | 3.6 | 5.2 |
| Passing yards | 125 | 154 |
| Sack yards lost | 17 | 26 |
| Net passing yards | 108 | 128 |
| Total yards | 247 | 371 |
| Fumbles-Lost | 2–0 | 0–0 |
| Turnovers | 0 | 0 |
| Penalties-Yards | 0–0 | 1–5 |
