= 1948 Cleveland Browns season =

NFL team season

- Owner: Arthur B. McBride
- Head coach: Paul Brown
- Home stadium: Cleveland Stadium

Results
- Record: 14–0
- Division place: 1st AAFC Western
- Playoffs: Won AAFC Championship (vs. Bills) 49–7
- All-Pros: Otto Graham; Marion Motley; Mac Speedie

The 1948 Cleveland Browns season was the team's third in the All-America Football Conference (AAFC). After winning the AAFC crown in 1946 and 1947, the league's first two years of existence, the Browns repeated as champions in 1948 and had a perfect season, winning all of their games.

The season began with a number of roster moves, including the addition of linebacker Alex Agase and halfbacks Ara Parseghian and Dub Jones. Following training camp and two preseason games, the Browns began the regular season with a win against the Buffalo Bills. Led by quarterback Otto Graham, fullback Marion Motley and ends Mac Speedie and Dante Lavelli, the Browns followed with a string of victories leading up to a November matchup with the San Francisco 49ers. Both teams had perfect records to that point, the 49ers relying heavily on the offensive production of quarterback Frankie Albert and end Alyn Beals to win their first 10 games. The Browns beat the 49ers 14–7, and followed two weeks later with another narrow victory over San Francisco, their closest competition in the AAFC in 1948.

By the end of the season, the Browns had a perfect 14–0 record and led the league's Western Division, setting up a championship-game matchup with the Bills, who had won a playoff to take the Eastern Division. Cleveland beat Buffalo 49–7 in December to win the championship and preserve its unbeaten record. It would be the only undefeated team in pro football history until the Dolphins did it in 1972, 24 years later. After the season, Graham, Motley and Speedie were included in many news organizations' All-Pro teams, alongside several other teammates. Graham was named the co-Most Valuable Player of the league alongside Albert. Browns games were televised for the first time in 1948.

The season is recognized as perfect by the Pro Football Hall of Fame, although the National Football League (NFL), which absorbed the Browns when the AAFC dissolved in 1949, did not recognize it. Ohio senator Sherrod Brown wrote a letter to NFL commissioner Roger Goodell in 2008 asking the league to officially recognize AAFC team statistics, including the perfect season. The 2007 New England Patriots were vying to complete a 19–0 season at the time and join the 1972 Miami Dolphins as the only teams to register a perfect record. On April 1, 2025, the NFL at its annual meeting has decided to begin officially incorporating AAFC records into its NFL records, officially recognizing the undefeated season.

== Offseason and roster moves ==
Cleveland finished the 1947 season with a 12–1–1 win-loss-tie record and beat the New York Yankees to win its second straight AAFC championship. While the team was successful in those first two years of existence, head coach Paul Brown made numerous roster changes before the 1948 season. He brought in linebacker Alex Agase and defensive tackle Chubby Grigg via a trade with the Chicago Rockets. Tommy James, a defensive back who stayed with the team through the 1955 season, came from the National Football League's Detroit Lions.

Defensive back Warren Lahr also joined the team but did not play in 1948 after breaking a leg in the preseason.

Offensive additions included halfback Ara Parseghian and quarterback George Terlep, but the most significant signing of the year was Dub Jones. Brown got Jones – who had a long and successful career in Cleveland – in a trade with the Brooklyn Dodgers for the rights to select Bob Chappuis in the 1947 AAFC draft. Author Andy Piasick describes this trade as one of the most astute in Browns history. The Browns also signed quarterback Y. A. Tittle from Louisiana State University, but were forced to send him to the Baltimore Colts as part of an effort to balance talent among the AAFC's teams during the league's third year of play.

Browns center Mike Scarry left before the season to become the head coach at Western Reserve. Frank Gatski took over at the position after Scarry's retirement. Don Greenwood, a halfback who featured in the team's first two seasons, retired after sustaining a serious cheekbone injury in 1947 and accepted a job as head football coach at Cuyahoga Falls High School in Cuyahoga Falls, Ohio. Browns games were televised for the first time in 1948 on 84 stations across the country. Only away games were shown in northeast Ohio; they were presented by Bob Neal and Stan Gee, who had announced Browns games on WGAR-AM radio in 1946 and 1947.

The entry of a new ownership group of the Brooklyn Dodgers in the offseason that included Branch Rickey affected the Browns' schedule in 1948. Rickey, an executive for baseball's Brooklyn Dodgers, convinced Brown to schedule a late-season road trip during which Cleveland would play three teams in eight days: the New York Yankees, the Los Angeles Dons and the San Francisco 49ers. The plan was part of an effort to bring more attention to the AAFC and help attendance by sending its most successful team on a cross-country road trip, a strategy that had worked in baseball.

== Roster and coaching staff ==
1948 Cleveland Browns roster
Quarterbacks: 60 Otto Graham S; 64 George Terlep S; Running backs: 99 Bill Boedeker; 70 Ollie Cline; 80 Bob Cowan; 86 Dub Jones CB; 90 Edgar Jones; 76 Marion Motley; 85 Ara Parseghian CB; 94 Dean Sensanbaugher; Ends/Receivers: 59 Horace Gillom P; 53 Frank Kosikowski; 56 Dante Lavelli; 58 Mac Speedie; 50 John Yonakor; 52 George Young	Linemen: 42 Chet Adams DT/T; 22 Frank Gatski C/LB; 34 Bob Gaudio G; 48 Chubby Grigg DT; 46 Lou Groza T/K; 32 Lin Houston G/MG; 24 Mel Maceau C/LB; 45 Ben Pucci T/DT; 44 Lou Rymkus T/DT; 49 Lenny Simonetti DT/T; 36 Ed Ulinski G/MG; 30 Bill Willis MG/G; Linebackers: 74 Tony Adamle OLB/FB; 35 Alex Agase MLB/G; 38 Weldon Humble MLB/G; 72 Lou Saban OLB	Defensive backs: 92 Tommy Colella CB/RB; 82 Tommy James CB/RB; 62 Cliff Lewis S/QB; Reserve: Warren Lahr CB/S (IR); Head Coach: Paul Brown; Assistants: John Brickels (Backfield); Blanton Collier (Backfield); Bill Edwards (Tackles); Dick Gallagher (Ends); Fritz Heisler (Guards); rookies in italics

== Preseason ==
=== Schedule ===
Week	Date	Opponent	Result	Record	Venue	Attendance	Game recap
1	August 22	Buffalo Bills	W 35–21	1–0	Rubber Bowl	28,069	Recap
2	August 27	Baltimore Colts	L 17–21	1–1	Glass Bowl	13,433	Recap

== Preseason game summaries ==
Cleveland held its training camp at the campus of Bowling Green State University, as it had the previous two years. Two preseason games were scheduled, one against the Buffalo Bills at the Rubber Bowl in Akron, Ohio and a second against the Baltimore Colts at the Glass Bowl in Toledo, Ohio.

=== Week 1: vs. Buffalo Bills ===
Team	1	2	3	4	Total
Bills	0	0	7	14	21
• Browns	21	7	7	0	35

- Date: Sunday, August 22
- Location: Rubber Bowl, Akron, Ohio
- Game attendance: 28,069
- Source: Plain Dealer

Scoring summary
1	CLE	Cliff Lewis 60-yard interception return (Lou Groza kick)	CLE 7–0
1	CLE	Dean Sensanbaugher pass from Otto Graham (Groza kick)	CLE 14–0
1	CLE	Mac Speedie 80-yard pass from Otto Graham (Lou Groza kick)	CLE 21–0
2	CLE	Dean Sensanbaugher 41-yard pass from Lewis (Groza kick)	CLE 28–0
3	CLE	Marion Motley 1-yard rush (Lou Groza kick)	CLE 35–0
3	BUF	Al Baldwin pass from George Ratterman (Bob Steuber kick)	CLE 35–7
4	BUF	Bill O'Connor pass from George Ratterman (Bob Steuber kick)	CLE 35–14
4	BUF	Bill Heywood 20-yard punt return	CLE 35–21

Cleveland's first preseason game was a victory over the Bills in Akron. The Browns scored three touchdowns in the first quarter, first on an interception return by Cliff Lewis and then on a pair of passes from quarterback Otto Graham to Dean Sensanbaugher and Mac Speedie. Sensanbaugher scored another touchdown in the second quarter on a pass from Lewis, who came in to substitute for Graham. By the time fullback Marion Motley ran for a short touchdown in the third quarter to make the score 35–0, coach Paul Brown had pulled most of the team's starters. Buffalo proceeded to mount a comeback, scoring one touchdown in the third quarter and two in the fourth. Buffalo's final score came on a punt return received by Rex Bumgardner. As he was about to be tackled at the Cleveland 20-yard line, Bumgardner pitched the ball to teammate Bill Heywood, who ran the rest of the way for the touchdown. Cleveland and Buffalo both had 12 first downs and 206 yards of rushing, but the Browns had 159 yards of passing to Buffalo's 127, helping secure the 35–21 win.

=== Week 2: vs. Baltimore Colts ===
Team	1	2	3	4	Total
• Colts	0	14	0	7	21
Browns	10	7	0	0	17

- Date: Friday, August 27
- Location: Glass Bowl, Toledo, Ohio
- Game attendance: 13,433
- Source: Plain Dealer

Scoring summary
1	CLE	Lou Groza 18-yard field goal	CLE 3–0
1	CLE	Ollie Cline 8-yard rush (Lou Groza kick)	CLE 10–0
2	BAL	Jake Leicht pass from Y. A. Tittle (Rex Grossman kick)	CLE 10–7
2	CLE	Ollie Cline 23-yard rush (Lou Groza kick)	CLE 17–7
2	BAL	Lamar Davis 25-yard pass from Y. A. Tittle (Rex Grossman kick)	CLE 17–14
4	BAL	Bus Mertes 38-yard rush (Rex Grossman kick)	BAL 21–17

Cleveland lost its second preseason game, played against the Baltimore Colts in 100-degree heat in Toledo, Ohio. Browns placekicker Lou Groza opened the scoring with an 18-yard field goal in the first quarter, and a touchdown by fullback Ollie Cline later in the period put the Browns up 10–0. Baltimore responded in the second quarter with a touchdown pass by quarterback Y. A. Tittle to receiver Jake Leicht. Cline ran for another touchdown soon thereafter, however, once more giving the Browns a 10-point lead. Colts receiver Lamar Davis caught a 25-yard touchdown pass at the end of the second quarter. Cleveland led 17–14 at halftime. Neither team scored again until the fourth quarter, when Baltimore's Bus Mertes ran for a 38-yard touchdown and secured the 21–17 win. A number of Cleveland players suffered injuries during the game. Graham hurt his hand, Motley strained his back and end Dante Lavelli suffered a broken leg. Lavelli's injury sidelined him for the first seven games of the regular season. During the game, Baltimore players Hub Bechtol and Lew Mayne, a former Brown, tapped a phone line that went from Cleveland's press box to its sideline. This allowed the Colts to listen in on coaches' conversations and anticipate the Browns' play-calling.

== Regular season ==
=== Schedule ===
Week	Date	Opponent	Result	Record	Venue	Attendance	Game recap
1	September 3	**Los Angeles Dons**	**W** 19–14	1–0	Cleveland Stadium	60,193	Recap
2	September 12	at Buffalo Bills	**W** 42–13	2–0	War Memorial Stadium	35,340	Recap
3	September 17	at **Chicago Rockets**	**W** 28–7	3–0	Soldier Field	30,874	Recap
4	September 26	**Chicago Rockets**	**W** 41–21	4–0	Cleveland Stadium	37,190	Recap
5	October 5	at Baltimore Colts	**W** 14–10	5–0	Memorial Stadium	22,359	Recap
6	October 10	Brooklyn Dodgers	**W** 30–17	6–0	Cleveland Stadium	31,187	Recap
7	October 17	Buffalo Bills	**W** 31–14	7–0	Cleveland Stadium	28,054	Recap
8	October 24	New York Yankees	**W** 35–7	8–0	Cleveland Stadium	46,912	Recap
9	November 7	Baltimore Colts	**W** 28–7	9–0	Cleveland Stadium	32,313	Recap
10	November 14	**San Francisco 49ers**	**W** 14–7	10–0	Cleveland Stadium	82,769	Recap
11	November 21	at New York Yankees	**W** 34–21	11–0	Yankee Stadium	52,518	Recap
12	November 25	at **Los Angeles Dons**	**W** 31–14	12–0	Los Angeles Memorial Coliseum	60,031	Recap
13	November 28	at **San Francisco 49ers**	**W** 31–28	13–0	Kezar Stadium	59,785	Recap
14	December 5	at Brooklyn Dodgers	**W** 31–21	14–0	Ebbets Field	9,821	Recap
Note: Intra-division opponents are in **bold** text.

== Game summaries ==
=== Week 1: vs. Los Angeles Dons ===
Team	1	2	3	4	Total
Dons	0	0	0	14	14
• Browns	3	7	9	0	19

- Date: Friday, September 3
- Location: Cleveland Stadium, Cleveland, Ohio
- Game attendance: 60,193
- Source: Pro Football Reference

Scoring summary
1	CLE	Lou Groza 51-yard field goal	CLE 3–0
2	CLE	Ara Parseghian 17-yard pass from Otto Graham (Groza kick)	CLE 10–0
3	CLE	Safety, Glenn Dobbs	CLE 12–0
3	CLE	Bill Boedeker 6-yard rush (Lou Groza kick)	CLE 19–0
4	LAD	John Kimbrough 2-yard rush (Ben Agajanian kick)	CLE 19–7
4	LAD	Joe Aguirre 9-yard pass from Glenn Dobbs	CLE 19–14

The Browns opened the regular season with a win at home against the Los Angeles Dons. The Dons had beaten the Chicago Rockets in their season opener the week before, but they struggled against the Browns. Cleveland built a 19–0 lead after the first three quarters on touchdowns by Ara Parseghian and Bill Boedeker, a Lou Groza field goal and a safety. The Dons, however, almost pulled off a comeback with just 30 seconds remaining in the game. Los Angeles fullback John Kimbrough scored a touchdown on a short run with time ticking down, and the Dons recovered an onside kick on the ensuing kickoff. Dons quarterback Glenn Dobbs then threw a long pass to end Joe Aguirre. It fell incomplete, but Cleveland was called for pass interference, and the ball was placed on the Browns' nine-yard line. Dobbs then threw a completion to Aguirre for a second touchdown with five seconds left to play. Time expired on the ensuing kickoff, however, and Cleveland won 19–14. Groza's 51-yard field goal matched a professional football record he set two years earlier.

=== Week 2: vs. Buffalo Bills ===
Team	1	2	3	4	Total
• Browns	14	7	7	14	42
Bills	0	13	0	0	13

- Date: Sunday, September 12
- Location: Civic Stadium, Buffalo, New York
- Game attendance: 35,340
- Source: Pro Football Reference

Scoring summary
1	CLE	Bob Cowan 11-yard pass from Otto Graham (Lou Groza kick)	CLE 7–0
1	CLE	Marion Motley 18-yard rush (Lou Groza kick)	CLE 14–0
2	BUF	Julie Rykovich 25-yard rush (kick failed)	CLE 14–6
2	CLE	Mac Speedie 10-yard pass from Otto Graham (Lou Groza kick)	CLE 21–6
2	BUF	Chet Mutryn 12-yard rush (Graham Armstrong kick)	CLE 21–13
3	CLE	Otto Graham 1-yard rush (Lou Groza kick)	CLE 28–13
4	CLE	Tommy Colella 23-yard rush (Lou Groza kick)	CLE 35–13
4	CLE	Dean Sensanbaugher 3-yard rush (Lou Groza kick)	CLE 42–13

The Browns beat the Bills in the second game of the regular season. Cleveland dominated the game from beginning to end, scoring 42 points and amassing 504 total yards on offense. The scoring began with touchdowns in the first quarter by halfback Bob Cowan and Marion Motley. End Mac Speedie caught another touchdown in the second quarter, giving the Browns three scores in a span of just 18 minutes. Buffalo scored two touchdowns of its own in the second period, however, and the score stood at 21–13 at halftime. The Browns pulled away in the second half, scoring three more unanswered touchdowns. Otto Graham ran for a score in the third period, but was taken out of the game when the Browns' lead widened. Motley ran for 136 yards on 17 carries, and Speedie matched an AAFC single-game record by recording 10 receptions for 151 yards. Despite the loss, Bills backs Vic Kulbitski and Julie Rykovich ran for 187 yards combined. The final score was 42–13.

=== Week 3: vs. Chicago Rockets ===
Team	1	2	3	4	Total
• Browns	7	7	14	0	28
Rockets	0	7	0	0	7

- Date: Friday, September 17
- Location: Soldier Field, Chicago
- Game attendance: 30,874
- Source: Pro Football Reference

Scoring summary
1	CLE	Otto Graham 12-yard rush (Lou Groza kick)	CLE 7–0
2	CLE	Bill Boedeker 4-yard pass from Otto Graham (Lou Groza kick)	CLE 14–0
2	CHR	Elroy Hirsch 13-yard pass from Angelo Bertelli (Steve Juzwik kick)	CLE 14–7
3	CLE	Bob Cowan 39-yard pass from Otto Graham (Lou Groza kick)	CLE 21–7
4	CLE	Bob Cowan 40-yard pass from Otto Graham (Lou Groza kick)	CLE 28–7

The Browns beat the Chicago Rockets in Chicago for their third straight victory. The matchup was a messy one, marked by turnovers and rough play by both sides. The teams combined for eight fumbles and four interceptions, and play was stopped several times to break up fights. Chicago was penalized 30 yards for unnecessary roughness, while Cleveland was penalized 15 yards. Despite the interruptions and frequent turnovers, Cleveland quarterback Otto Graham had his best game of the season, throwing three touchdowns and rushing for a fourth. Bob Cowan caught two of the touchdowns. Chicago, meanwhile, scored just one touchdown – a short pass to Elroy Hirsch from quarterback Angelo Bertelli in the second quarter. Chicago successfully contained Marion Motley, Cleveland's most productive back, who finished the game with 49 yards on 14 carries. The final score was 28–7.

=== Week 4: vs. Chicago Rockets ===
Team	1	2	3	4	Total
Rockets	7	3	0	0	10
• Browns	0	0	14	7	21

- Date: Sunday, September 26
- Location: Cleveland Stadium, Cleveland, Ohio
- Game attendance: 37,190
- Source: Pro Football Reference

Scoring summary
1	CHR	Eddie Prokop 74-yard pass from Jesse Freitas (Jim McCarthy kick)	CHR 7–0
2	CHR	Jim McCarthy 18-yard field goal	CHR 10–0
3	CLE	Bill Boedeker 37-yard pass from Otto Graham (Lou Groza kick)	CHR 10–7
3	CLE	Dub Jones 43-yard pass from Otto Graham (Lou Groza kick)	CLE 14–10
4	CLE	Bill Boedeker 2-yard rush (Lou Groza kick)	CLE 21–10

The Browns next played the Rockets for a second time in as many weeks, this time in Cleveland. The Rockets opened the scoring with a 74-yard pass from quarterback Jesse Freitas to receiver Eddie Prokop in the first four minutes of the game, and added a field goal by Jim McCarthy near the end of the second quarter. The Browns did not score in the first half, but came back to win the game in the second. Rockets defenders were double-teaming Cleveland's ends, and the Browns adjusted by sending halfbacks out to receive deep passes. Cleveland halfbacks Dub Jones and Bill Boedeker both caught long touchdown passes from Graham in the third quarter. Boedeker ran in for another touchdown in the fourth quarter to make the final score 21–10. As in the previous game, there were several cases of rough play: tackle Lou Rymkus was ejected from the game for hitting Jim Pearcy of the Rockets. A Rockets player picked up a handful of sand from the stadium's baseball infield and threw it in Mac Speedie's face during the game, temporarily blinding him. Hirsch was accidentally kicked by a Browns player and suffered a skull fracture.

=== Week 5: vs. Baltimore Colts ===
Team	1	2	3	4	Total
• Browns	7	0	7	0	14
Colts	7	3	0	0	10

- Date: Tuesday, October 5
- Location: Memorial Stadium, Baltimore
- Game attendance: 22,359
- Source: Pro Football Reference

Scoring summary
1	BAL	Billy Hillenbrand 78-yard pass from Y. A. Tittle (Rex Grossman kick)	BAL 7–0
1	CLE	Edgar Jones 2-yard rush (Lou Groza kick)	7–7
2	BAL	Rex Grossman 40-yard field goal	BAL 10–7
3	CLE	Edgar Jones 12-yard pass from Otto Graham (Lou Groza kick)	CLE 14–10

The Browns won their fifth game of the season against the Baltimore Colts on a muddy field during a rainstorm. Led by quarterback Y. A. Tittle, the Colts began the scoring on the fourth play of the game with a 78-yard touchdown pass to Billy Hillenbrand. A few minutes later, the Browns evened the score after a pass from Graham set up a short touchdown run by Edgar Jones. The Colts retook the lead in the second quarter with a field goal by Rex Grossman and led 10–7 at the half. Focusing on the running game because of the muddy conditions, the Browns scored a touchdown in the third quarter that put them in the lead for good. Jones, who was returning from a rib injury, finished the day with 61 yards and two touchdowns, while Motley ran for 130 yards. The slippery and windy conditions caused miscues on both sides. Tittle and Motley had fumbles, and Cleveland botched a fake field goal attempt in the second quarter. The final score was 14–10. While the Browns had won their first five games, the San Francisco 49ers were at the top of the AAFC's western division standings, having won all six of their games.

=== Week 6: vs. Brooklyn Dodgers ===
Team	1	2	3	4	Total
Dodgers	0	10	7	0	17
• Browns	10	0	7	13	30

- Date: Sunday, October 10
- Location: Cleveland Stadium, Cleveland, Ohio
- Game attendance: 31,187
- Source: Pro Football Reference

Scoring summary
1	CLE	Edgar Jones 8-yard rush (Lou Groza kick)	CLE 7–0
1	CLE	Lou Groza 53-yard field goal	CLE 10–0
2	BKD	Mickey Colmer 2-yard rush (Lee Tevis kick)	CLE 10–3
2	BKD	Lee Tevis 36-yard field goal	10–10
3	CLE	Bill Boedeker 10-yard rush (Lou Groza kick)	CLE 17–10
3	BKD	Hank Foldberg 51-yard blocked FG return (Hardy Brown kick)	17–17
4	CLE	George Young 9-yard fumble return (kick failed)	CLE 23–17
4	CLE	Marion Motley 3-yard rush (Lou Groza kick)	CLE 30–17

The Browns beat the Brooklyn Dodgers in the sixth game of the season. While the Dodgers had not won a game all season, they started off strong against Cleveland. The Browns took a 10–0 lead in the first quarter, but the Dodgers answered with 10 points of their own in the second quarter to tie the score at halftime. Edgar Jones ran for Cleveland's first touchdown, which Groza followed with a 53-yard field goal, the longest of his career at the time. Brooklyn's Mickey Colmer ran in the team's second-quarter touchdown after a 66-yard drive. The Browns came back with another touchdown in the third quarter, aided by two long Horace Gillom receptions, but the Dodgers again evened the score after a Groza field goal was blocked and returned by Hank Foldberg for a touchdown. Cleveland pulled away in the fourth quarter, however, with a fumble recovery for a touchdown by George Young and a short run by Motley. The Browns had 23 first downs in the game, setting a team record. Groza missed an extra point after one of Cleveland's touchdowns, breaking a long streak. He also narrowly missed a 57-yard field goal attempt that would have set a professional football record if it were good.

=== Week 7: vs. Buffalo Bills ===
Team	1	2	3	4	Total
Bills	7	0	0	7	14
• Browns	17	0	7	7	31

- Date: Sunday, October 17
- Location: Cleveland Stadium, Cleveland, Ohio
- Game attendance: 28,054
- Source: Pro Football Reference

Scoring summary
1	CLE	Edgar Jones 44-yard pass from Otto Graham (Lou Groza kick)	CLE 7–0
1	BUF	Al Baldwin 22-yard pass from Jim Still (Bob Steuber kick)	7–7
1	CLE	Lou Groza 45-yard field goal	CLE 10–7
1	CLE	Marion Motley 3-yard rush (Lou Groza kick)	CLE 17–7
3	CLE	Mac Speedie 15-yard pass from Otto Graham (Lou Groza kick)	CLE 24–7
4	BUF	Lou Tomasetti 9-yard pass from George Ratterman (Bob Steuber kick)	CLE 24–14
4	CLE	Mac Speedie 30-yard pass from Cliff Lewis (Lou Groza kick)	CLE 31–14

The Browns won their seventh game in a row against the Bills in Cleveland. Edgar Jones scored the Browns' first touchdown on the team's third offensive play on a 35-yard pass from Graham. Motley fumbled on the Browns' next possession, however, and the Bills capitalized on the mistake. After several running plays brought the ball to the Browns' 22-yard line, quarterback Jim Still threw to Al Baldwin for a touchdown that evened the score. A Groza field goal and a short touchdown run by Motley later in the first quarter put the Browns up by 10 points at halftime. Cleveland retained the lead for the rest of the game as end Mac Speedie caught touchdown passes in the third and fourth quarters. Graham ended the game with 11 completions for 189 yards and two touchdowns. Speedie, who was leading the league in receiving, added seven receptions for 140 yards. While the Bills lost, second-string quarterback George Ratterman, who came in for Still in the second quarter, put in a strong performance, completing 13 passes for 174 yards. His totals included a touchdown throw to Lou Tomasetti in the fourth quarter, when the game was out of reach.

=== Week 8: vs. New York Yankees ===
Team	1	2	3	4	Total
Yankees	0	0	0	7	7
• Browns	7	14	7	7	35

- Date: Sunday, October 24
- Location: Cleveland Stadium, Cleveland, Ohio
- Game attendance: 46,912
- Source: Pro Football Reference

Scoring summary
1	CLE	Dante Lavelli 29-yard pass from Otto Graham (Lou Groza kick)	CLE 7–0
2	CLE	Bob Cowan 63-yard pass from Otto Graham (Lou Groza kick)	CLE 14–0
2	CLE	Mac Speedie 9-yard pass from Otto Graham (Lou Groza kick)	CLE 21–0
3	CLE	Dante Lavelli 18-yard pass from Otto Graham (Lou Groza kick)	CLE 28–0
4	CLE	Otto Graham 22-yard rush (Lou Groza kick)	CLE 35–0
4	NYY	Buddy Young 34-yard pass from Pete Layden (Harvey Johnson kick)	CLE 35–7

End Dante Lavelli returned to the lineup for the Browns' week-eight game against the New York Yankees after recovering from a broken leg sustained in the preseason. Lavelli's return had an immediate impact. He caught a 29-yard pass from Graham for the Browns' first touchdown in the first quarter. Graham then threw two more touchdowns in the second quarter to Bob Cowan and Mac Speedie. Cowan scored after catching Graham's pass behind New York's defenders and running 35 yards for the end zone. Receptions by Cowan and Lavelli set up Speedie's 9-yard touchdown. Lavelli caught another touchdown at the beginning of the third quarter to give the Browns a 28–0 lead. Graham ran 22 yards for a fifth Browns touchdown in the fourth quarter after a pass play broke down. The Yankees avoided a shutout in the final minute of the game, when end Buddy Young got behind Cleveland's defenders and caught a 34-yard touchdown pass from Pete Layden. The Browns had 486 total yards in the game, including 337 yards of passing. While Cleveland remained undefeated, the San Francisco 49ers continued to hold the best record in the AAFC with nine straight wins to begin the season.

=== Week 9: vs. Baltimore Colts ===
Team	1	2	3	4	Total
Colts	0	0	0	7	7
• Browns	7	7	7	7	28

- Date: Sunday, November 7
- Location: Cleveland Stadium, Cleveland, Ohio
- Game attendance: 32,313
- Source: Pro Football Reference

Scoring summary
1	CLE	Edgar Jones 4-yard rush (Lou Groza kick)	CLE 7–0
2	CLE	Marion Motley 22-yard rush (Lou Groza kick)	CLE 14–0
3	CLE	Edgar Jones 4-yard pass from Otto Graham (Lou Groza kick)	CLE 21–0
4	CLE	Ara Parseghian 15-yard rush (Lou Groza kick)	CLE 28–0
4	BAL	Billy Hillenbrand 69-yard pass from Y. A. Tittle (Rex Grossman kick)	CLE 28–7

Cleveland beat Baltimore for the second time during the regular season for its ninth straight victory. A Baltimore turnover on downs early in the game set up the Browns' first score, a short touchdown run by Edgar Jones in the first quarter. Baltimore's Y. A. Tittle drove deep into Cleveland territory early in the second quarter, but another turnover on downs gave the ball back to the Browns. Passes from Graham to Lavelli and Speedie took the Browns to the Colts' 22-yard line, and Motley ran from there for a touchdown to make the score 14–0 at halftime. Jones scored Cleveland's third touchdown to cap an 85-yard drive at the start of the third quarter. Ara Parseghian ran for another touchdown in the fourth quarter. The Colts avoided a shutout later in the period when Tittle threw a screen pass to Billy Hillenbrand, who ran 69 yards for a touchdown. The final score was 28–7. The win gave the Browns 12 victories in a row extending to the previous season, setting a new AAFC record. Lou Groza missed two field goals during the game.

=== Week 10: vs. San Francisco 49ers ===
Team	1	2	3	4	Total
49ers	7	0	0	0	7
• Browns	7	0	7	0	14

- Date: Sunday, November 14
- Location: Cleveland Stadium, Cleveland, Ohio
- Game attendance: 82,769
- Source: Pro Football Reference

Scoring summary
1	CLE	Otto Graham 14-yard rush (Lou Groza kick)	CLE 7–0
1	SFO	Joe Perry 1-yard rush (Joe Vetrano kick)	7–7
3	CLE	Edgar Jones 4-yard rush (Lou Groza kick)	CLE 14–7

A victory over San Francisco gave the Browns 10 wins in a row to start the regular season. The game was eagerly anticipated by both sides: San Francisco had started the season with 10 victories, while the Browns had won their first nine games. The 49ers relied heavily on their offense, which featured quarterback Frankie Albert and end Alyn Beals. The team came into the matchup with the Browns averaging 35.9 points per game. The Browns, meanwhile, were more proficient than the 49ers on defense and in placekicking: the team ranked first in the AAFC in fewest points allowed, and Groza held the league record for the longest field goal. The game began with a San Francisco fumble of Cleveland's opening kickoff that was recovered by Lou Saban. Several plays later, Graham ran 14 yards for a touchdown, giving the Browns their first points. San Francisco responded later in the period with a rushing touchdown by Joe Perry to tie the score. Cleveland struck back with an Edgar Jones touchdown in the third quarter, however, and held on to win the game 14–7. Ara Parseghian was a standout on both offense and defense, batting down several of Albert's passes. The crowd of 82,769 set a professional football record. While Cleveland won, several key players suffered injuries. Speedie had a separated shoulder, while linebacker Bill Willis was kicked in the face and Tommy James hurt his ankle. Graham had his hand stepped on, and guard Weldon Humble suffered a chin injury.

=== Week 11: vs. New York Yankees ===
Team	1	2	3	4	Total
• Browns	14	13	7	0	34
Yankees	0	14	0	7	21

- Date: Sunday, November 21
- Location: Yankee Stadium, New York City
- Game attendance: 52,518
- Source: Pro Football Reference

Scoring summary
1	CLE	Marion Motley 78-yard pass from Otto Graham (Lou Groza kick)	CLE 7–0
1	CLE	Edgar Jones 1-yard rush (Lou Groza kick)	CLE 14–0
2	NYY	Bruce Alford 29-yard pass from Pete Layden (Harvey Johnson kick)	CLE 14–7
2	NYY	Otto Schnellbacher 40-yard interception return (Harvey Johnson kick)	14–14
2	CLE	Lou Groza 34-yard field goal	CLE 17–14
2	CLE	Bob Cowan 9-yard rush (Lou Groza kick)	CLE 24–14
2	CLE	Lou Groza 18-yard field goal	CLE 27–14
3	CLE	Marion Motley 12-yard rush (Lou Groza kick)	CLE 34–14
4	NYY	Bob Kennedy 1-yard rush (Harvey Johnson kick)	CLE 34–21

The Browns beat the Yankees in the eleventh game of the season. It was the first of three road games the Browns were scheduled to play in a span of eight days. The Browns opened the scoring early in the first quarter with a screen pass from Graham to Motley, who ran 78 yards for a touchdown. An interception by Parseghian on the Yankees' next possession set up another Browns touchdown, a one-yard run by Edgar Jones. The Yankees responded with two touchdowns of their own in the second quarter. The first was a long pass from Pete Layden to Bruce Alford early in the period. On Cleveland's next possession, Graham threw a pass to John Yonakor, but as Yonakor was waiting for the ball to arrive, New York's Otto Schnellbacher jumped in front of him and made an interception. Schnellbacher had a clear shot at Cleveland's end zone and ran it in for a touchdown that tied the game at 14 points. An interception by Yonakor later in the quarter set up a Groza field goal, and the Browns pulled away as halfback Bob Cowan ran for a touchdown and Groza added another field goal before halftime. Another touchdown by Motley in the third quarter put the Browns ahead by 20 points. The Yankees scored a final touchdown in the fourth quarter to cap a 45-yard drive, but the Browns won the game 34–21. Lavelli was hit in the eye early in the game and had to sit out. Tackle Chubby Grigg and Edgar Jones were also hurt in the game, adding to Cleveland's long list of injured players.

=== Week 12: vs. Los Angeles Dons ===
Team	1	2	3	4	Total
• Browns	0	14	17	0	31
Dons	7	7	0	0	14

- Date: Thursday, November 25
- Location: Los Angeles Memorial Coliseum
- Game attendance: 60,031
- Source: Pro Football Reference

Scoring summary
1	LAD	Walt Clay 1-yard rush (Ben Agajanian kick)	LAD 7–0
2	CLE	Dante Lavelli 49-yard pass from Otto Graham (Lou Groza kick)	7–7
2	LAD	Walt Clay 1-yard rush (Ben Agajanian kick)	LAD 14–7
2	CLE	Bob Cowan 17-yard pass from Otto Graham (Lou Groza kick)	14–14
3	CLE	Otto Graham 1-yard rush (Lou Groza kick)	CLE 21–14
3	CLE	Lou Groza 36-yard field goal	CLE 24–14
3	CLE	Tony Adamle 19-yard rush (Lou Groza kick)	CLE 31–14

A victory against Los Angeles in the twelfth week of the season preserved Cleveland's undefeated record. The Dons began the scoring in the first quarter with a 75-yard drive engineered by quarterback Glenn Dobbs. The series ended with a short touchdown run by halfback Walt Clay. The Browns came back to tie the game in the second quarter after a 71-yard drive that features several completions from Graham to Lavelli. Lavelli caught a 49-yard pass from Graham for the score. On the next possession, Los Angeles converted a fourth down deep in their own territory, extending a long drive that ended with another touchdown by Clay. Cleveland again evened the score with under two minutes left in the first half on a touchdown pass to Edgar Jones. The Browns pulled away in the third quarter, when Graham ran a quarterback sneak for a touchdown. Groza later kicked a 36-yard field goal, and an interception by Cliff Lewis set up a run by Tony Adamle for a final touchdown. The final score was 31–14. Graham twisted his knee in the fourth quarter, and Edgar Jones, Parseghian and Bob Gaudio also had injuries. The Browns planned to stay at the hot springs in Boyes, California to recover as they prepared to face the 49ers for a second time in San Francisco three days later.

=== Week 13: vs. San Francisco 49ers ===
Team	1	2	3	4	Total
• Browns	10	0	21	0	31
49ers	0	14	7	7	28

- Date: Sunday, November 28
- Location: Kezar Stadium, San Francisco
- Game attendance: 59,785
- Source: Pro Football Reference

Scoring summary
1	CLE	Dante Lavelli 41-yard pass from Otto Graham (Lou Groza kick)	CLE 7–0
1	CLE	Lou Groza 24-yard field goal	CLE 10–0
2	SFO	Joe Perry 2-yard rush (Joe Vetrano kick)	CLE 10–7
2	SFO	Alyn Beals 4-yard pass from Frankie Albert (Joe Vetrano kick)	SFO 14–10
3	SFO	Alyn Beals 29-yard pass from Frankie Albert (Joe Vetrano kick)	SFO 21–10
3	CLE	Marion Motley 6-yard pass from Otto Graham (Lou Groza kick)	SFO 21–17
3	CLE	Dub Jones 20-yard pass from Otto Graham (Lou Groza kick)	CLE 24–21
3	CLE	Edgar Jones 33-yard pass from Otto Graham (Lou Groza kick)	CLE 31–21
4	SFO	Joe Perry 6-yard pass from Frankie Albert (Joe Vetrano kick)	CLE 31–28

Three days after beating the Dons, the Browns played the 49ers in San Francisco. While the Browns had won their first 12 games, the rematch against the 49ers was significant because the 49ers held an 11–1 record, their only loss coming against the Browns two weeks earlier. The teams were both in the AAFC's Western Division, and a loss would have put the Browns in a tie with the 49ers for the lead. The teams' combined 23–1 record was the best ever for two professional squads in one game, and as of 2007, has not been surpassed. Graham was initially considered doubtful for the game because of the knee injury he suffered against the Dons, but team trainer Wally Bock cleared him to play. The game began with a 49ers fumble on their first play from scrimmage. Tony Adamle recovered the ball, and Graham threw a 41-yard touchdown pass to Lavelli on the Browns' first play. A field goal by Groza later in the first quarter put the Browns up 10–0, but the 49ers came back in the second period and scored two touchdowns. The first was a short run by halfback Joe Perry and the second was a pass from Albert to Beals. San Francisco widened its lead in the third quarter with another touchdown catch by Beals. Graham, however, engineered three drives in the space of eight minutes that gave the browns three touchdowns and a 10-point advantage. Motley ran in the first score, while Dub Jones and Edgar Jones caught Graham passes for the other two. The 49ers scored a touchdown in the final quarter, but the Browns won the game 31–28. After the game, Paul Brown called it "Otto's greatest performance" given his injury.

=== Week 14: vs. Brooklyn Dodgers ===
Team	1	2	3	4	Total
• Browns	7	14	10	0	31
Dodgers	0	0	7	14	21

- Date: Sunday, December 5
- Location: Ebbets Field, Brooklyn
- Game attendance: 9,821
- Source: Pro Football Reference

Scoring summary
1	CLE	Dub Jones 1-yard rush (Lou Groza kick)	CLE 7–0
2	CLE	Dante Lavelli 54-yard pass from Otto Graham (Lou Groza kick)	CLE 14–0
2	CLE	Otto Graham 1-yard rush (Lou Groza kick)	CLE 21–0
3	CLE	Lou Groza 37-yard field goal	CLE 24–0
3	CLE	Horace Gillom 25-yard pass from Otto Graham (Lou Groza kick)	CLE 31–0
3	BKD	Bob Hoernschemeyer 38-yard pass from Bob Chappuis (Hardy Brown kick)	CLE 31–7
4	BKD	Bob Hoernschemeyer 3-yard rush (Hardy Brown kick)	CLE 31–14
4	BKD	Monk Gafford 60-yard pass from Bob Chappuis (Hardy Brown kick)	CLE 31–21

The Browns ended their regular season with a win over the Dodgers and an undefeated record. The Browns began the game by scoring 31 unanswered points. The first score came on a short Dub Jones run that followed an 80-yard drive in the first quarter. The next score came on a 76-yard drive in the second quarter. After a pair of passes and a 14-yard run by Edgar Jones, Graham completed a long touchdown pass to Lavelli, who sped away from defender Monk Gafford on the right sideline. Graham engineered another long drive just before the end of the first half, completing 18- and 20-yard passes to Speedie. The 90-yard march ended with a short touchdown run by Graham, giving Cleveland a 21–0 advantage at the half. Groza kicked a field goal at the beginning of the third quarter, and a fumble by Gafford on the ensuing kickoff led to a touchdown pass from Graham to Gillom, putting the Browns up by 31 points. With a comfortable lead, Brown took out his starters and substituted third-string players. The Dodgers proceeded to score three touchdowns, two of which came on long passes from Bob Chappuis, but the Browns won the game 31–21. The win left the Browns on top of the standings in the AAFC's Western Division ahead of San Francisco, which had lost only two games, both to the Browns. The perfect regular season record was the first in professional football since 1942, when the National Football League's Chicago Bears won all of their games. Chicago, however, lost the NFL championship that year.

== Final standings ==
AAFC Western Division
	W	L	T	PCT	DIV	PF	PA	STK
Cleveland Browns	14	0	0	1.000	6–0	389	190	W14
San Francisco 49ers	12	2	0	.857	4–2	495	248	W1
Los Angeles Dons	7	7	0	.500	2–4	258	305	L2
Chicago Rockets	1	13	0	.071	0–6	202	439	L11

Note: Tie games were not officially counted in the standings.

== AAFC championship game ==
Team	1	2	3	4	Total
Bills	0	0	7	0	7
• Browns	7	7	14	21	49

- Date: Sunday, December 19
- Location: Cleveland Stadium, Cleveland, Ohio
- Game attendance: 22,981
- Source: Pro Football Reference

Scoring summary
1	CLE	Edgar Jones 3-yard rush (Lou Groza kick)	CLE 7–0
2	CLE	George Young 18-yard fumble return (Lou Groza kick)	CLE 14–0
3	CLE	Edgar Jones 9-yard pass from Otto Graham (Lou Groza kick)	CLE 21–0
3	CLE	Marion Motley 29-yard rush (Lou Groza kick)	CLE 28–0
3	BUF	Al Baldwin 1-yard pass from Jim Still (Graham Armstrong kick)	CLE 28–7
4	CLE	Marion Motley 31-yard rush (Lou Groza kick)	CLE 35–7
4	CLE	Marion Motley 9-yard rush (Lou Groza kick)	CLE 42–7
4	CLE	Lou Saban 39-yard interception return (Lou Groza kick)	CLE 49–7

The Browns won the AAFC's Western Division with their perfect record and faced the Buffalo Bills, the winners of the Eastern Division, in the AAFC championship game. The Bills had tied with the Colts for the lead in the Eastern, forcing a playoff that the Buffalo won on December 12 in Baltimore. The championship game took place in Cleveland in 35-degree weather and was sparsely attended. The Browns were expected to win the game, having beaten the Bills twice in the regular season and possessing a significantly better record than the 7–7 Bills. The scoring began with a late-first-quarter Edgar Jones touchdown run, followed by a fumble return for a touchdown by George Young in the second period that put the Browns ahead 14–0 at halftime. Cleveland scored two more touchdowns in the third quarter on runs by Jones and Motley before Buffalo scored its first points. Aided by a roughing the kicker penalty on the Browns, the Bills capped an 80-yard drive with a short touchdown pass from Jim Still to Al Baldwin. Motley scored two more touchdowns in the fourth quarter, however, and Lou Saban ran back an interception for a third to make the final score 49–7. Motley and Edgar Jones led the Browns offense in the game, accounting for a large share of the team's offensive production. Graham had an uncharacteristically quiet day, passing for just 118 yards on 11 completions. The victory made the Browns the first professional team to win three league championships in a row, following AAFC titles they won in 1946 and 1947. It was also the first time a professional football team finished a full season unbeaten and untied since a championship game was instituted in the NFL in 1933. The Chicago Bears had finished with perfect records in 1934 and 1942, but lost the NFL championship both times. The Browns had won 18 consecutive games stretching to the 1947 season, a professional record that stood until 2004.

In the NFL, the Philadelphia Eagles won the championship 7–0 during a blizzard in Philadelphia's Shibe Park. Following the win, Eagles owner Alexis Thompson advocated a championship game between the top teams in the NFL and the AAFC, in part because he was losing money and felt an inter-league championship would draw large crowds. Thompson was also a leading proponent among NFL owners of negotiation with the AAFC over a deal to ease the leagues' competition for talent, which had driven up salaries and was eating into owners' profits. Thompson met with Browns owner Mickey McBride and agreed to a playoff – either one game in Yankee Stadium or a best-of-three series with games in Philadelphia, Cleveland and possibly New York. Thompson's proposal was shot down by other NFL owners, however, and he was given a reprimand by commissioner Bert Bell for suggesting the NFL-AAFC championship. Frustrated with his financial losses and lack of support among the owners, Thompson sold the Eagles shortly after the season ended.

== Season leaders and postseason ==
Graham finished the season with the most passing yards in the AAFC and was named the league's Most Valuable Player, sharing the honor with Frankie Albert of the 49ers. Motley led the league in rushing, and Groza scored the most field goals in the league for the second year in a row. Speedie, meanwhile, had the most overall receptions and receptions per game of all receivers in the AAFC and NFL for the second year running. The Associated Press named Graham, Speedie and Motley to the first team of its combined AAFC-NFL All-Pro team, while Lou Rymkus and Bill Willis made the second team. The magazine Sporting News put Motley and Speedie on its first-team All-Pro list and put Graham and Willis on its second team. Cleveland's top players also made All-Pro teams assembled by the New York Daily News, United Press International and the AAFC itself.

The Browns' perfect season and third championship victory came during a strong year for Cleveland sports teams. That April, the Cleveland Barons, the city's American Hockey League team, won the Calder Cup championship. The Cleveland Indians, the city's Major League Baseball club, set an all-time season attendance record and won the World Series. The Browns' success was also a major draw for fans: the team led professional football in attendance in 1948 with an average of 45,517 people per game, although that was still 10,000 lower than the year before. The distribution of talent and fortune among AAFC's teams was unbalanced, however, and while the Browns, the 49ers and the Dons were successes at the gate, teams including the Rockets and Colts languished financially. The NFL was also facing major financial trouble – nine of its ten teams lost money that year – and the two leagues' competition for talent led to talks about a merger. Discussions centered around how many AAFC teams the NFL would absorb; most owners favored four teams, but the talks broke down when powerful owners George Preston Marshall of the Washington Redskins and Tim Mara of the New York Giants intervened and suggested only Cleveland and San Francisco should be absorbed. The AAFC continued play in 1949, but was disbanded after that season. The Browns, 49ers and Colts were merged into the NFL starting in 1950.

== Perfect season controversy ==
In winning all of their regular season games and the AAFC championship, the Browns recorded the first perfect season in professional football since the advent of NFL championships in 1933. The feat has been duplicated only once since, by the Miami Dolphins in 1972. When the AAFC faltered and dissolved after the 1949 season and the NFL absorbed the Browns, their new league did not recognize AAFC statistics, including the perfect season. The Pro Football Hall of Fame, however, recognizes it as a perfect season. In 2008, United States Senator Sherrod Brown, who represents Ohio in the United States Congress, sent a letter to NFL commissioner Roger Goodell asking the league to recognize AAFC championships and team records including the perfect season. At the time, the New England Patriots were undefeated as they prepared for the Super Bowl against the New York Giants, a game they went on to lose. Dante Lavelli also advocated for the NFL to adopt AAFC records.

== Sources ==
- Piascik, Andy (2007). The Best Show in Football: The 1946–1955 Cleveland Browns. Lanham, Maryland: Taylor Trade Publishing.
- Knight, Jonathan (2013). The Browns Bible: The Complete Game-by-Game History of the Cleveland Browns. Kent, OH: Black Squirrel Books.
- Webster, Gary (2016). Just Too Good: The Undefeated 1948 Cleveland Browns. Jefferson, North Carolina: McFarland.
