= Jerry Whalen =

American football player (1928–1973)

No. 40
- Positions: Center, guard, tackle

Personal information
- Born: April 23, 1928; Buffalo, New York
- Died: November 1973 (age 45); Buffalo, New York
- Listed height: 6 ft 1 in (1.85 m)
- Listed weight: 235 lb (107 kg)

Career information
- High school: Canisius (NY)
- College: Canisius

Career history
- Buffalo Bills (1949); Toronto Argonauts (1949)

Career statistics
- Games: 17
- Stats at Pro Football Reference

Gerald Cornelius Whalen (April 23, 1928 – November 1973) was an American football player who played at the center, guard, and tackle positions. He played college football for Canisius and professional football for the Buffalo Bills and Toronto Argonauts.

== Early life ==
Whalen was born in 1928 in Buffalo, New York. He attended and played football at Canisius High School in Buffalo, New York.

== College football ==
He was recruited to play at Notre Dame however he was unable to attend. He played college football at Canisius in 1947.

== Professional football ==
Although he had two years of college eligibility remaining, the Buffalo Bills of the All-America Football Conference (AAFC) received permission from the league commissioner in July 1948 to sign Whalen. Whalen played for the Bills during the 1948 season. He appeared in seven games with the Bills. The Buffalo Bills traded him to the San Francisco 49ers, however due to family constraints, he was unable to go to the West Coast. He also played in the Canadian Football League for the Toronto Argonauts during the 1949 season. He appeared in 12 games with the Argonauts.

== Family and later years ==
He died in 1973 at age 45 in Buffalo, New York. He was survived by wife Marion Lazickas (Dec.2023), daughters Debra and Sandra, and twin sons Gerald (Dec. 2020)and James.
