= Don Schneider =

American football player (1923–2009)

- Schneider, c. 1946

No. 89
- Position: Halfback

Personal information
- Born: April 3, 1923; Crafton, Pennsylvania, U.S.
- Died: July 13, 2009 (aged 86); West Chester, Pennsylvania, U.S.
- Listed height: 5 ft 9 in (1.75 m)
- Listed weight: 170 lb (77 kg)

Career information
- High school: J. P. McCaskey (Lancaster, Pennsylvania)
- College: Penn (1944-1947)
- NFL draft: 1946: 5th round, 34th overall pick

Career history
- Buffalo Bills (1948)

Career AAFC statistics
- Rushing yards: 70
- Rushing average: 4.7
- Receptions: 1
- Receiving yards: 14
- Stats at Pro Football Reference

Donald Paul Schneider (April 3, 1923 – July 13, 2009) was an American football player who played at the halfback position. He played college football for Penn and professional football for the Buffalo Bills.

== Early life ==
Schneider was born in 1923 in Crafton, Pennsylvania. He attended and played football at J. P. McCaskey High School in Lancaster, Pennsylvania. He graduated from McCaskey in 1942. The Lancaster New Era in 1944 described him as "one of the finest backs ever developed at McCaskey High." He was also a star sprinter in high school.

== College football and military service ==
Schneider enrolled at the University of Pennsylvania in 1942 and played on the freshman football team. His college career was interrupted by service in the United States Army Air Forces from December 1942 through February 1945. He was an aerial gunner. He also played college football for Penn from 1945 to 1947. As a senior, he was a member of the undefeated 1947 Penn Quakers football team that was ranked No. 7 in the final AP Poll. He also played varsity baseball for three years at Penn.

== Professional football ==
He was selected by the Chicago Bears in the fifth round (34th overall pick) of the 1946 NFL draft but did not play for the Bears. He played for the Buffalo Bills of the All-America Football Conference (AAFC) during their 1948 season and appeared in nine games. He was a starter on defense and a reserve player on offense.

== Family and later years ==
After one year of pro football, he served as a high school football coach at various schools in Pennsylvania and New Jersey from 1949 to 1950. He also taught English and physical education. From 1960 to 1962, he was an assistant football coach at Lehigh University. He was a teacher and coach at Watching Hills (NJ) Regional High School from 1962 to 1969 and assistant principal until 1971. He was then a principal in schools in the Philadelphia area from 1971 to 1983.

In 1993, Schneider was inducted into the Susquehanna Valley chapter of the Pennsylvania Sports Hall of Fame. He died in 2009 in West Chester, Pennsylvania, at age 86.
