= Marty Comer =

American football player (1917–1998)

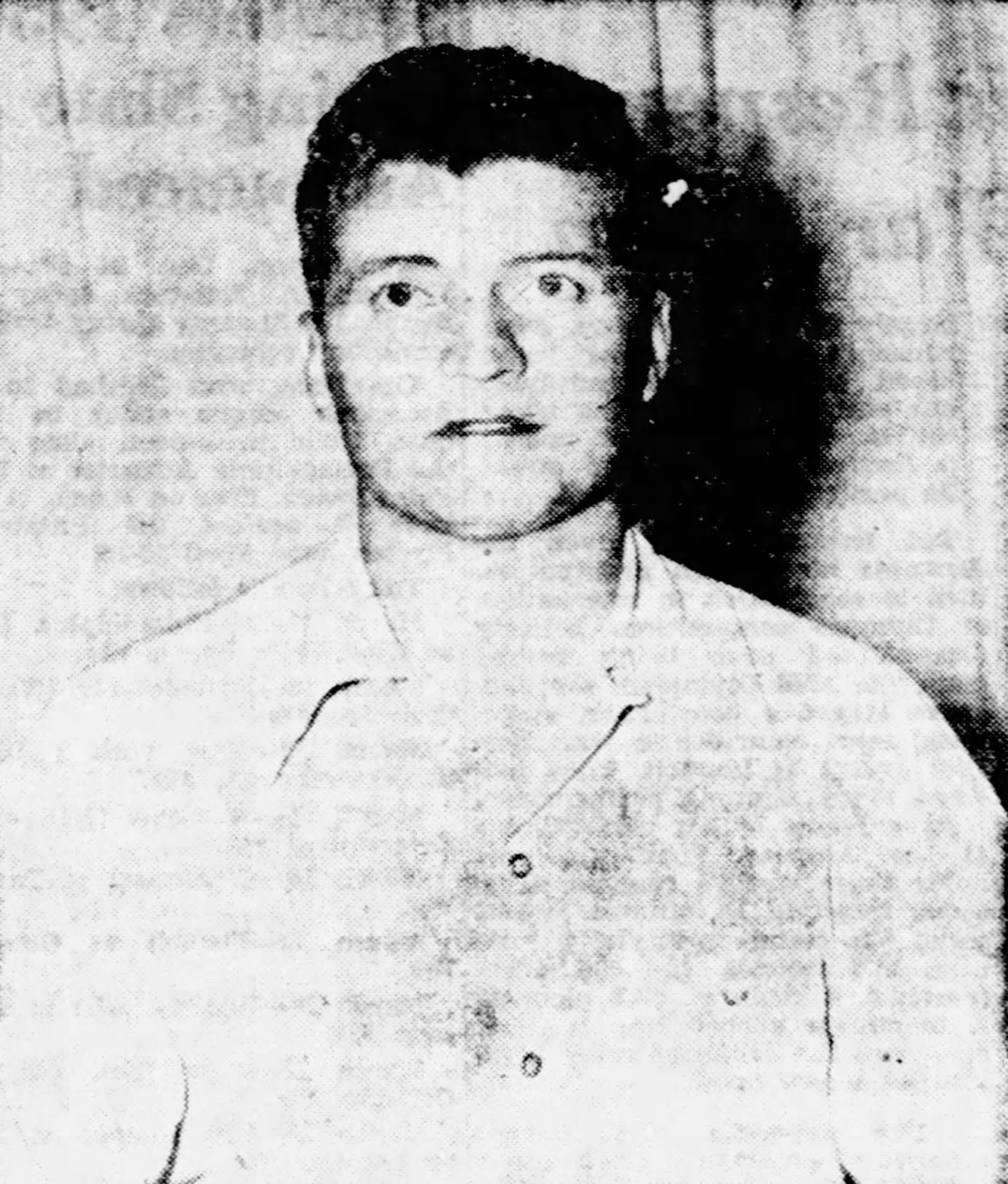
- Marty Comer, 1949

Profile
- Position: End

Personal information
- Born: October 28, 1917; Indianapolis
- Died: March 15, 1998 (aged 80); New Orleans
- Listed height: 6 ft 0 in (1.83 m)
- Listed weight: 203 lb (92 kg)

Career information
- College: Tulane
- NFL draft: 1943: 5th round, 34th overall pick

Career history
- Buffalo Bisons (1946–1948)
- Stats at Pro Football Reference

Martin Franklin Comer (October 28, 1917 – March 15, 1998) was an American football end.

Klutka was born in Indianapolis and attended high school at the Horace Mann School in Indiana. He played college football at the end position for Tulane.

He was drafted by the Brooklyn Dodgers in the fifth round (34th overall pick) in the 1943 NFL draft, but never played for the team. Instead, he served in the military during World War II and played for the 1944 Second Air Force Superbombers football team that was ranked No. 20 in the final AP Poll.

He played professional football in the All-America Football Conference for the Buffalo Bisons from 1946 to 1948. He appeared in 27 games, nine as a starter, and caught eight passes for 147 yards and two touchdowns.

Comer later worked as a football coach at Fortier High School in Louisians. He was selected as the Louisiana class AA high school coach of the year in 1949. He died in 1998 in New Orleans.
