= Bob Stefik =

American football player (1923–2008)

Personal information
- Born: October 8, 1923; Madison, Wisconsin, U.S.
- Died: April 9, 2008 (aged 84); Lewiston, New York, U.S.

Career information
- College: Niagara

Career history
- Buffalo Bills (1948)
- Stats at Pro Football Reference

Robert Mathias Stefik (October 8, 1923 – April 9, 2008) was an American professional football player.

== Early life ==
Stefik was born Robert Mathias Stefik on October 8, 1923, in Madison, Wisconsin. He moved to Niagara Falls, New York, as a child and attended St. Mary's High School. He played at the collegiate level at Niagara University.

== Career ==
Stefik was a member of the Buffalo Bills of the All-America Football Conference in 1948. During World War II, he served in the United States Army. Stefik operated a real estate business for 60 years and served on several community boards.
