= Jim Still =

American football player (1924–1999)

No. 63, 62
- Position: Back

Personal information
- Born: March 5, 1924; Columbia, South Carolina, U.S.
- Died: January 3, 1999 (aged 74); Green Cove Springs, Florida, U.S.
- Listed height: 6 ft 3 in (1.91 m)
- Listed weight: 193 lb (88 kg)

Career information
- High school: Panama City (FL)
- College: Mississippi Gulf Coast CC (1941–1942); Georgia Tech (1943, 1946–1947)
- NFL draft: 1948: 16th round, 145th overall pick

Career history
- Buffalo Bills (1948–1949)

Career AAFC statistics
- Punts: 63
- Punt yards: 2,439
- Passing yards: 175
- TD–INT: 2-4
- Passer rating: 51.4
- Stats at Pro Football Reference

James Edward "Long Jim" Still Jr. (March 5, 1924 – January 3, 1999) was an American football player who played quarterback and punter. He played college football for Mississippi Gulf Coast College and Georgia Tech and professional football for the Buffalo Bills.

== Early life ==
Still was born in 1924 in Columbia, South Carolina. He attended and played football at Panama City High School in Panama City, Florida.

== College football and military service ==
He played college football at Mississippi Gulf Coast College and Georgia Tech. He also served in the United States Marine Corps. During World War II he took part in many invasions in the Philippine theater. He led the 1947 Georgia Tech Yellow Jackets football team to a 10–1 record, a No. 10 national ranking, and a victory while throwing 3 touchdown passes in the 1948 Orange Bowl.

== Professional football ==
Still was selected by the Chicago Cardinals in the 16th round (145th overall pick) of the 1948 NFL draft but did not play for the Cardinals. He instead signed in January 1948 with the Los Angeles Dons of the All-America Football Conference (AAFC). In August 1948, the Dons traded Still to the Buffalo Bills. He played for the Bills during the 1948 and 1949 seasons, appearing in 21 AAFC games. He was on the team when the Bills advanced to the 1948 AAFC Championship Game against the Cleveland Browns. He and George Ratterman were the first quarterbacks to play in a championship game for the city of Buffalo. He went 6-of-18 for 80 yards with a touchdown and two interceptions in the 49–7 loss.

== Family and later years ==
He died in 1999 at age 74 in Green Cove Springs, Florida.
