= Merle J. Smith =

Commander Merle James Smith Jr.
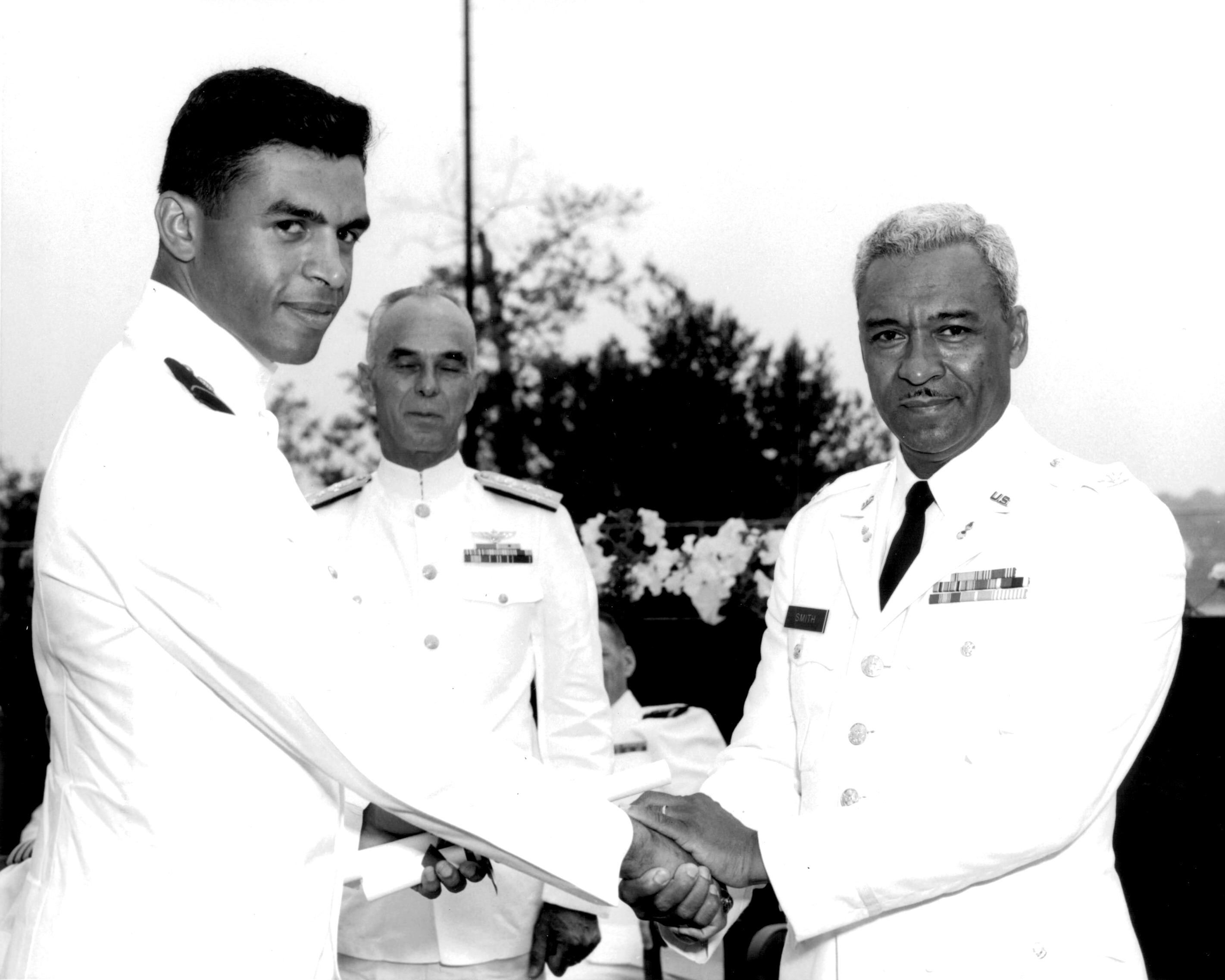
- Born: August 11, 1944; Greeneville, S.C.
- Died: June 16, 2021 (aged 76); New London, CT
- Burial place: Arlington National Cemetery
- Education: U.S. Coast Guard Academy, B.S. 1966; George Washington University Law School, J.D. 1974
- Spouse: Lynda Smith
- Children: Merle James Smith, III; Chelsea B. Smith; Danielle Smith
- Military career
- Branch: United States Coast Guard
- Service years: 1966-1988
- Rank: Commander
- Commands: Cape Wash; USCGC Point Mast (WPB-82316); USCGC Point Ellis (WPB-82330)
- Awards: Bronze Star with V device

Commander Merle J. Smith Jr. was the first African American to graduate from the United States Coast Guard Academy in 1968.

== Early life ==
Smith was born in Greenville, South Carolina in 1944 to U.S. Army Colonel Merle J. Smith who had been an ordnance and intelligence officer as well as member of the Kansas City Monarchs baseball team of the Negro Leagues and Jacqueline T. Smith a former English professor at Howard University. He grew up on military bases including in Germany and Japan and graduated from Aberdeen High School in Maryland where he played football and wrote for the school newspaper.

== Coast Guard Academy ==
Smith applied to several military academies, but visited the Coast Guard Academy and was welcomed by their coach, NFL hall of fame player Otto Graham. Smith was not the first African American student at the USCGA, but the second. Jarvis L. Wright Jr. was admitted in 1955, but resigned for health reasons in 1957. Smith would enter the academy in 1962 and play defensive end for Coach Graham. He missed the 1963 season, which was considered one of their greatest with a knee injury. He graduated in 1966 without a single demerit.

== Coast Guard career ==
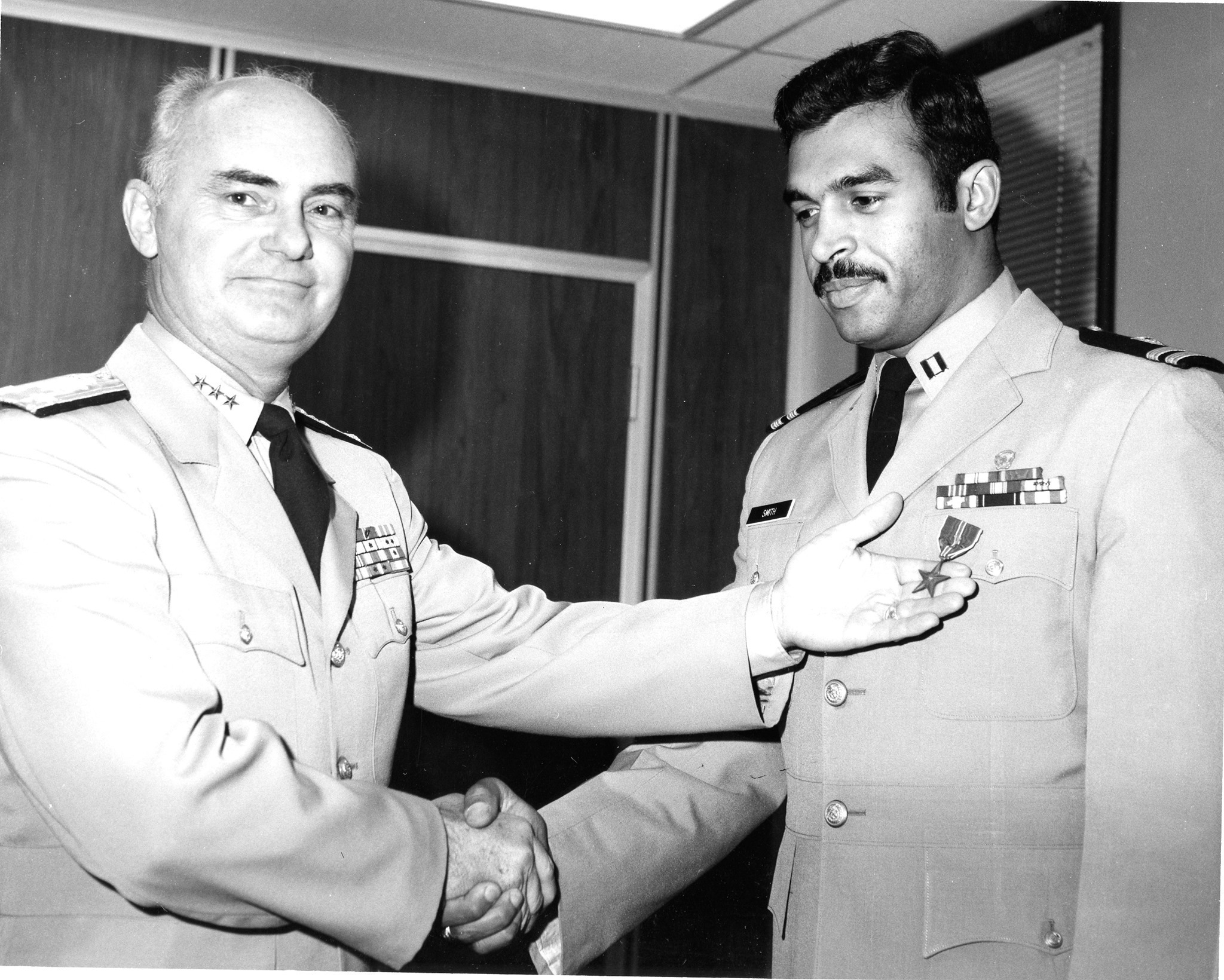
Cmdr. Merle J. Smith Jr. was the first African American to graduate the U.S. Coast Guard Academy . Vice Adm. Thomas Sargent pins the Bronze Star Medal on Lt. Smith for his service in Vietnam as the first African American officer to command a U.S. warship in close quarters combat. (U.S. Coast Guard courtesy photo)

Once he commissioned, Ensign Smith was assigned to the USCGC Minnetonka (WHEC-67) where he served as communications officer and later operations officer. He then commanded the Cape Wash, a former Navy ASW patrol boat used for search and rescue. Two years later he was sent to Vietnam where he command the cutters USCGC Point Mast (WPB-82316) and USCGC Point Ellis (WPB-82330) where he earned the Bronze Star Medal with “V” device, Navy Meritorious Unit Citation, Presidential Unit Citation, Vietnamese Cross of Gallantry and Vietnam Campaign Medal with four stars.

Smith would serve at the Coast Guard headquarters, in the USCG Military Justice Division, at the USCGA as faculty member, assistant football coach and class advisor. He would join the Coast Guard Reserve in 1979 after 13 years of active duty.

== Later life ==
Smith would join General Dynamics Corporation subsidiary Electric Boat in their legal department where he worked until he retired in 1995. He would retire from the Coast Guard Reserve in 1988 with the rank of commander. Smith defended a USCGA cadet in 2006 in the first court-martial ever at the academy.

== Death and legacy ==
Cmdr. Smith died on 16 June 2021 of complications from Parkinson's disease and COVID-19. In 2017, the Merle J. Smith Eclipse Legacy Endowment was established by the USCGA Alumni Association to increase recruitment and retention of underrepresented minorities at the Coast Guard Academy. On 1 October 2021, the USCGA renamed its officer's club the Cmdr. Merle J. Smith Consolidated Club in his honor. The Smithsonian has a number of items from Smith's career including his academy dress jacket in their collection.
