= John Kerns =

American gridiron football player (1923–1988)

No. 46, 60
- Position: Offensive tackle

Personal information
- Born: June 10, 1923; Ashtabula, Ohio, U.S.
- Died: June 10, 1988 (aged 65); Leesburg, Florida, U.S.
- Listed height: 6 ft 3 in (1.91 m)
- Listed weight: 245 lb (111 kg)

Career information
- High school: Geneva (Geneva, Ohio)
- College: Ohio (1943, 1946); Duke (1944); North Carolina (1945)
- NFL draft: 1946: 15th round, 137th overall pick

Career history
- Buffalo Bills (1947–1949); Toronto Argonauts (1950–1951)

Awards and highlights
- Grey Cup champion (1950)

Career AAFC statistics
- Games played: 40
- Games started: 24
- Stats at Pro Football Reference

John Emery Kerns (June 17, 1923 – June 7, 1988) was an American professional football who played for the Buffalo Bills of the All-America Football Conference (AAFC) and the Toronto Argonauts. He won the Grey Cup with them in 1950. He played college football at Ohio University. He died in 1988 on his 65th birthday while playing tennis, of a heart attack.
