= Graham Armstrong =

American football player (1918–1960)

No. 18, 32, 43
- Position: Tackle

Personal information
- Born: May 30, 1918; Cleveland, Ohio, U.S.
- Died: June 25, 1960 (aged 42); Gates Mills, Ohio, U.S.
- Listed height: 6 ft 4 in (1.93 m)
- Listed weight: 230 lb (104 kg)

Career information
- High school: Cathedral Latin (Cleveland)
- College: John Carroll (1936–1939)

Career history
- Cleveland Rams (1941, 1945); Cleveland Browns (1946)*; Buffalo Bills (1947–1948); Chicago Hornets (1949)*
- * Offseason or practice squad member only

Awards and highlights
- NFL champion (1945)
- Stats at Pro Football Reference

Graham Leo Armstrong (May 30, 1918 – June 25, 1960) was an American professional football tackle who played for the Cleveland Rams of the National Football League (NFL) and the Buffalo Bills of the All-America Football Conference (AAFC). He played college football at John Carroll University.

== Early life and college ==
Graham Leo Armstrong was born on May 30, 1918, in Cleveland, Ohio. He attended Cathedral Latin High School in Cleveland.

Armstrong was a member of the John Carroll Blue Streaks of John Carroll University from 1936 to 1939 and a two-year letterman from 1938 to 1939.

== Professional career ==
Armstrong signed with the Cleveland Rams of the National Football League in 1941. He played in seven games for the Rams during the 1941 season. In August 1942, it was reported that Armstrong, who was working for the Cleveland Police Department, was not granted a leave of absence so he could play for the Rams that year. He served in the United States Navy during World War II. After being discharged from the Navy, Armstrong signed with the Rams again in October 1945 and appeared in one game for them that year. On December 16, 1945, the Rams beat the Washington Redskins in the 1945 NFL Championship Game by a score of 15–14. Armstrong became a free agent after the season.

Armstrong was signed by the Cleveland Browns of the All-America Football Conference (AAFC) on July 24, 1946, but was later released.

In 1947, he signed with the Buffalo Bills of the AAFC. He played in all 14 games, starting eight, for the Bills during the 1947 season and converted eight of ten extra points while also missing one field goal. The Bills finished the season with an 8–4–2 record, good for second place in the Eastern Division. Armstrong was later released during the middle of the 1948 season on October 11, 1948, but soon re-signed. Overall, he appeared in 13 games, all starts, for the Bills in 1948, totaling one reception, 15 of 17 extra points, and one missed field goal. The Bills went 7–7 that year, finishing in first place in the Eastern Division. Armstong also started two playoff games for the Bills during the 1948 season, converting five of five extra points.

In 1949, Armstrong was allocated to the new Chicago Hornets of the AAFC. He officially signed with the team in March 1949. However, he was later released.

== Death ==
Armstrong died on June 25, 1960, in Gates Mills, Ohio.
