= Bill O'Connor (gridiron football) =

American gridiron football player (1926–2021)

No. 54, 55, 53, 66
- Positions: End, defensive end

Personal information
- Born: May 2, 1926; New York City, New York, U.S.
- Died: March 6, 2021 (aged 94); Toronto, Ontario, Canada
- Listed height: 6 ft 4 in (1.93 m)
- Listed weight: 220 lb (100 kg)

Career information
- High school: Mount Saint Michael Academy (The Bronx, New York)
- College: Notre Dame (1941–1942, 1946–1947)
- NFL draft: 1948: 18th round, 160th overall pick

Career history
- Buffalo Bills (1948); Cleveland Browns (1949); Jersey City Giants (1950); New York Yanks (1951); Toronto Argonauts (1952–1953)

Awards and highlights
- AAFC champion (1949); Grey Cup champion (1952); 2× National champion (1946, 1947)

Career NFL/AAFC statistics
- Receptions: 45
- Receiving yards: 493
- Touchdowns: 2
- Stats at Pro Football Reference

William Francis "Zeke" O'Connor, Jr. (May 2, 1926 – March 6, 2021) was an American professional football end who played five seasons in the All-America Football Conference (AAFC) and Interprovincial Rugby Football Union (IRFU) in the late 1940s and early 1950s. After retiring, O'Connor went into business and devoted himself to helping Nepalese Sherpas.

O'Connor grew up in a large Catholic family in New York City and went to college at the University of Notre Dame. After starting for Notre Dame's football team as a freshman in 1944, he spent two years in the U.S. Navy during World War II and played for a service team at Naval Station Great Lakes that was coached by Paul Brown. O'Connor returned to Notre Dame in 1946 and graduated in 1947, but he did not play in his senior year because of a knee injury.

O'Connor signed in 1948 with the Buffalo Bills of the AAFC, where he played for one year. He was then traded to the Cleveland Browns, another AAFC team coached by Brown. The Browns won the AAFC championship in 1949, but O'Connor was cut early the next year and played one season for the minor-league Jersey City Giants. He next had a one-year stint with the New York Yanks of the National Football League before his playing career in the CFL with the Toronto Argonauts. A late-game touchdown catch by O'Connor helped the Argonauts win the Grey Cup in 1952.

O'Connor worked for Sears in Canada after his playing career, and served as the color commentator for Grey Cup broadcasts from 1956 to 1981. He became friends with the famed mountaineer Sir Edmund Hillary and helped establish a foundation in his name to benefit Sherpas in Nepal. On September 24, 2015, O'Connor was the recipient of the Sandy Hawley Community Service Award, awarded by the Ontario Sports Hall of Fame in Toronto, Ontario.

== Early life and college ==
O'Connor was born in New York City and grew up in the Bronx, one of the city's five boroughs. He was the son of a police officer and part of a large Catholic family. O'Connor attended Mount Saint Michael Academy, a Catholic school in the Bronx, where he played football and was voted the team's best end in 1942 and 1943. His large size – he was six feet, four inches tall – made him an attractive prospect for college football programs across the country, and he accepted a scholarship offer from Notre Dame.

O'Connor was a starter for Notre Dame as a freshman left end in 1944. The team finished the season with an 8–2 win–loss record under coach Edward McKeever, but O'Connor joined a V-12 Navy College Training Program in the middle of the year as World War II raged on. O'Connor played for a U.S. Navy team in a game against Army held in London in late 1944. In 1945, he played for a service team at Naval Station Great Lakes outside of Chicago that was coached by Paul Brown. He caught a touchdown pass that December in a 39–7 win over Notre Dame.

O'Connor returned to Notre Dame in 1946, but coach Frank Leahy demoted him to the second-team midway through the season as punishment for leaving the school's South Bend, Indiana, campus to see a girl. He suffered a knee injury in a practice before the start of the 1947 season that kept him on the bench all year. Notre Dame went undefeated in 1946 and 1947, and won the college football national championship both years by finishing first in the national polls.

== Professional career ==
O'Connor was selected by the Buffalo Bills of the All-America Football Conference (AAFC) in the fourth round of the 1948 draft. The Green Bay Packers of the National Football League were also interested in signing him, but O'Connor chose to play for the Bills because several Notre Dame alumni – including quarterback George Ratterman – were on the team. He had 301 receiving yards and two touchdowns in 1948, when the Bills had a 7–7 record and won the AAFC's eastern division. The Bills lost the AAFC championship game to the Cleveland Browns.

The Bills traded O'Connor in early 1949 to the Browns for tackle Bob McClelland. O'Connor played in nine games for the Browns, a team coached by Paul Brown, but did not have a reception. Cleveland won the AAFC championship that year, its fourth in a row. The Browns cut O'Connor before the beginning of the next season, and he played in 1950 for the Jersey City Giants, a minor-league team in the now-defunct American Association.

O'Connor signed in 1951 to play for the New York Yanks, an NFL team. The Yanks finished with a 1–9–2 win–loss–tie record, putting them out of contention in the NFL's National Division. O'Connor earned a master's degree from Columbia University while playing in New York.

In 1952, O'Connor began a two-year stint with the Toronto Argonauts of the Canadian Football League (CFL). In O'Connor's first season with the team, the Argonauts finished with a 7–4–1 record and went on to win the Grey Cup, the CFL's championship trophy. O'Connor caught a touchdown pass off of his fingertips late in the championship game from Nobby Wirkowski, sealing the 21–11 win over the Edmonton Eskimos. The play was one of the most celebrated of its era in the CFL and the Grey Cup, which was televised for the first time in 1952. O'Connor retired from football after the 1953 season, when the Argonauts finished with a 5–9 regular-season record.

== Later life ==
O'Connor stayed in Canada after finishing his football career. He coached football in Toronto and took an entry-level job at Sears, a global department store chain. He also served as a color commentator for Grey Cup broadcasts from 1956 to 1981. He worked at Sears for 31 years, rising to vice president of public relations.

As O'Connor climbed the corporate ladder at Sears, he became the head of marketing for sporting goods in Canada and handled the company's relationships with major sports figures. These included Ted Williams and Sir Edmund Hillary, who became the first man to summit Mount Everest in 1953. O'Connor and Hillary met while O'Connor was on a camping trip in Ottawa in 1973 and struck up a friendship. Later that year, Hillary invited O'Connor and several other Sears executives to visit Nepal and consider charitable contributions for the Sherpa people who helped him climb Everest. O'Connor suffered from altitude sickness on the trip, but agreed to establish the Sir Edmund Hillary Foundation of Canada when he returned to Toronto.

O'Connor started the foundation and was its president for more than 30 years, helping build schools and hospitals in Nepal. He also introduced Nepal to the Special Olympics, an athletic competition for disabled adults. His daughter Karen took over the foundation in 2008. O'Connor published a memoir in 2012 called Journey with the Sherpas: The Story of Zeke O'Connor and the Sir Edmund Hillary Foundation. He later lived in Toronto and still visited the Sherpas annually. He has three children. O'Connor died on March 6, 2021, at the age of 94.
