= Lloyd Cheatham =

American football player (1919–1989)

No. 33, 60
- Position: Quarterback

Personal information
- Born: March 20, 1919; Nantes, Oklahoma, U.S.
- Died: June 11, 1989 (aged 70); Charlotte, North Carolina, U.S.
- Listed height: 6 ft 2 in (1.88 m)
- Listed weight: 211 lb (96 kg)

Career information
- High school: Carbon Hill (Carbon Hill, Alabama)
- College: Auburn
- NFL draft: 1942: 2nd round, 14th overall pick

Career history
- Chicago Cardinals (1942); New York Yankees (1946-1948)

Career NFL statistics
- Receptions: 21
- Receiving Yards: 283
- Receiving touchdowns: 4
- Stats at Pro Football Reference

Hilliard Lloyd Cheatham (March 20, 1919 – June 11, 1989) was an American professional football player who was a quarterback in the National Football League (NFL) and All-America Football Conference (AAFC).

Cheatham was born in Oklahoma in 1919, but was raised in Alabama. He attended Carbon Hill High School in Carbon Hill, Alabama. He played college football for the Auburn Tigers. He played at Auburn from 1939 to 1941, playing on both offense and defense at the quarterback and fullback positions, and earning a reputation as an outstanding blocker.

He was selected in the second round with the 14th pick in the 1942 NFL draft and played in the NFL for the Chicago Cardinals during the 1942 season. He appeared in 11 games for the Cardinals, three as a starter.

During World War II, he served in the military and played on the United States Naval Training Center Bainbridge football team.

After the war, Cheatham played in the AAFC for the New York Yankees from 1946 to 1948. He appeared in 38 games for the Yankees, 26 as a starter, catching 15 passes for 254 yards and three touchdowns.

After retiring from football, Cheatham worked as a zone manager for the Chevrolet Division of General Motors and later with Merrill Lynch Realty. He died in 1989 in Charlotte, North Carolina.
