= Bill Gompers =

American football player (1928–2019)

Profile
- Position: Halfback

Personal information
- Born: March 20, 1928; Wheeling, West Virginia, U.S.
- Died: May 3, 2019 (aged 91); McMurray, Pennsylvania, U.S.
- Listed height: 6 ft 1 in (1.85 m)
- Listed weight: 185 lb (84 kg)

Career information
- High school: Wheeling (WV) Central Catholic
- College: Notre Dame
- NFL draft: 1948: undrafted

Career history
- Buffalo Bills (1948)

Awards and highlights
- 2× National champion (1946, 1947)
- Stats at Pro Football Reference

William George Gompers (March 20, 1928 – May 3, 2019) was an American football halfback who played for the Buffalo Bills. He played college football at the University of Notre Dame, having previously attended Wheeling Central Catholic High School in Wheeling, West Virginia.
