= Lou Tomasetti =

American football player (1916–2004)

No. 21, 15, 87
- Positions: Fullback, Halfback

Personal information
- Born: January 8, 1916; Old Forge, Pennsylvania, U.S.
- Died: March 23, 2004 (aged 88); Doylestown, Pennsylvania, U.S.
- Listed height: 6 ft 0 in (1.83 m)
- Listed weight: 198 lb (90 kg)

Career information
- College: Bucknell (1935-1938)
- NFL draft: 1939: 11th round, 92nd overall pick

Career history
- Pittsburgh Pirates/Steelers (1939–1940); Philadelphia Eagles (1941); Detroit Lions (1941); Philadelphia Eagles (1942); Buffalo Bisons (1946); Buffalo Bills (1947-1949)

Career NFL/AAFC statistics
- Rushing yards: 1,905
- Rushing average: 3.8
- Receptions: 69
- Receiving yards: 702
- Total touchdowns: 20
- Stats at Pro Football Reference

Louis Vincent Tomasetti (January 8, 1916 – March 23, 2004) was an American professional football running back in the National Football League (NFL) from 1939 to 1942 and in the All-America Football Conference (AAFC) from 1946 to 1949. He was selected in the 11th round of the 1939 NFL draft with the 92nd overall pick. Tomasetti played college football at Bucknell University.
