= George Ratterman =

American football player (1926–2007)

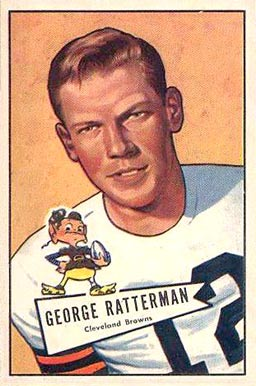
- Ratterman, c. 1952

No. 61, 25, 71, 16
- Position: Quarterback

Personal information
- Born: November 12, 1926; Cincinnati, Ohio, U.S.
- Died: November 3, 2007 (aged 80); Centennial, Colorado, U.S.
- Listed height: 6 ft 0 in (1.83 m)
- Listed weight: 182 lb (83 kg)

Career information
- High school: St. Xavier (Cincinnati)
- College: Notre Dame (1945–1946)
- NFL draft: 1948: 16th round, 139th overall pick

Career history
- Buffalo Bills (1947–1949); New York Yanks (1950–1951); Montreal Alouettes (1951); Cleveland Browns (1952–1956)

Awards and highlights
- 2× NFL champion (1954, 1955); AAFC completion percentage leader (1949); National champion (1946)

Career AAFC/NFL statistics
- Passing attempts: 565
- Passing completions: 299
- Completion percentage: 52.9%
- TD–INT: 39–41
- Passing yards: 4,279
- Passer rating: 70.5
- Rushing yards: 31
- Rushing touchdowns: 6
- Stats at Pro Football Reference

George William Ratterman (November 12, 1926 – November 3, 2007) was an American professional football player who was a quarterback in the All-America Football Conference (AAFC) and the National Football League (NFL). He played college football for the Notre Dame Fighting Irish.

== Early life ==
He was born in Cincinnati, Ohio, where he graduated from St. Xavier High School in 1944. He played college football at the University of Notre Dame from 1944 through 1946, primarily as a backup to quarterbacks Frank Dancewicz and Johnny Lujack. He was the last of only four students in Notre Dame history to earn letters in four different sports (football, basketball, baseball, tennis). Legendary football coach Frank Leahy called him "the greatest all-around athlete in the history of Notre Dame."

== Professional football career ==
He played professional football with the Buffalo Bills of the AAFC from 1947 to 1949, when the league merged with the NFL. In his first year, 1947, at the age of 20, Ratterman threw 22 touchdown passes, setting a professional football rookie record that stood for more than fifty years until broken by Peyton Manning in 1998. He continued his career with the New York Yanks of the NFL in 1950 and 1951, the Montreal Alouettes of the Canadian Football League in 1951 and finished with the Cleveland Browns of the NFL from 1952 through 1956. He led the NFL in touchdown passes in 1950 while playing for New York. In 1956, he became the Browns' starting quarterback, succeeding Otto Graham, and was first player in the history of football to wear a radio receiver in his helmet, which allowed Cleveland Coach Paul Brown to call plays using a microphone instead of sending in messenger players for each play. Ratterman was featured on the cover of Sports Illustrated, October 8, 1956. A leg injury on October 21, 1956, ended his football career.

== Post-playing career activities ==
=== General counsel for the American Football League Players Association ===
He earned his law degree in 1956 and was admitted to practice in Ohio and Kentucky. He acted as general counsel for the American Football League Players Association in the mid-1960s, when Jack Kemp was the president of the union.

=== Sheriff of Campbell County ===
Ratterman was elected sheriff of Campbell County, Kentucky, in 1961 after an irregular campaign season during which Ratterman was drugged with chloral hydrate and put in bed with a stripper as part of a failed blackmail attempt. The publicity from the botched frame-up attempt catapulted him and his party to victory in the election.

Ratterman's tenure as sheriff was marked by a dramatic diminishment of gambling, prostitution and vice businesses that had dominated Newport since the Civil War. Ratterman's co-ordination with federal agents and his personal relationship with Attorney General Robert F. Kennedy have been credited.

He was an unsuccessful candidate for county judge and United States Congress in the 1960s. He finished third in the Republican primary for Kentucky's 4th congressional district behind Gene Snyder.

=== Confessions of a Gypsy Quarterback ===
He is the author of a book, Confessions of a Gypsy Quarterback, Coward-McCann, 1962, containing hilarious anecdotes of his experiences and hijinks in professional football. In the foreword, Pro Football Hall of Fame quarterback Otto Graham says Ratterman was the "best natural clown and comic I ever saw in professional football." Once, while playing in a game for the Browns, Ratterman received a play call made by then-coach Paul Brown's messenger guard system. Ratterman told the guard to "go back and get another one" as he did not like the play. The guard, a rookie named Joe Skibinski, obediently turned to run back to the bench and Coach Brown before Ratterman and other players stopped him.

=== Broadcasting career ===
He worked as a color commentator on TV and radio broadcasts of AFL and NFL football games for ABC-TV (1960–1964) and NBC-TV (1965–1973). He was frequently paired with Jack Buck and Charlie Jones on broadcast teams. He had the distinction of providing color analysis to Jim Simpson's play-by-play of Super Bowl I on Sunday, January 15, 1967, for the NBC Radio Network. During half-time of the first NFL-AFL Championship Game at the Los Angeles Coliseum, Ratterman interviewed Dallas Cowboys quarterback Don Meredith and San Diego Chargers wide receiver Lance Alworth about their thoughts on the game's first half.

== Death ==
Ratterman died in Centennial, Colorado, on November 3, 2007, from complications of Alzheimer's disease. He and his wife of 59 years, Anne, had ten children.
