= Buffalo Bills (AAFC) =

1946–1949 AAFC football team from Buffalo, New York

General information
- Founded: 1946
- Folded: 1949
- Stadium: Civic Stadium
- Headquartered: Buffalo, New York
- Colors

Team history
- Buffalo Bisons ^{(1946)} Buffalo Bills ^{(1947–1949)}

League / conference affiliations
- All-America Football Conference; Eastern

The Buffalo Bills were an American football team, based in Buffalo, New York, that played in the All-America Football Conference (AAFC) from 1946 to 1949. During its first season in 1946, the team was known as the Buffalo Bisons; during the last three years they were renamed in honor of "Buffalo Bill" Cody. Unlike the Cleveland Browns, San Francisco 49ers, and Baltimore Colts, the franchise was not one of the three AAFC teams that merged with the National Football League prior to the 1950 season.

== History ==
=== AAFC years ===
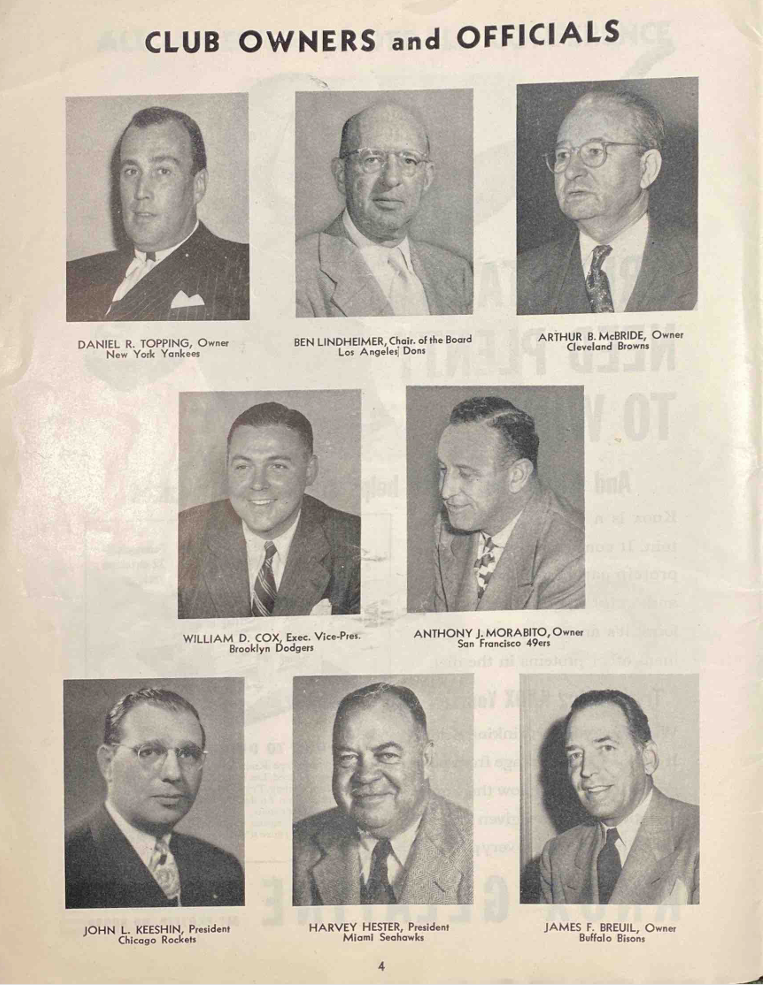
Team owner James Breuil (bottom right) pictured among the original owners of the AAFC.

After only one year, owner James Breuil held a name-the-team contest in hopes of choosing a more distinctive nickname; "Bisons" had been the traditional nickname for Buffalo teams for many years. The winning choice was "Bills," which was a play on the name of the famed Wild West showman Buffalo Bill Cody. Coincidentally a barbershop quartet who would achieve fame a few years later was formed with the same name that year. The team was the successor to the Buffalo Tigers/Indians team from the 1940 American Football League; that league had folded as a result of World War II.

During their existence, the Bills played at Civic Stadium, later known as War Memorial Stadium.

Though the 1946 Bisons were not a success, the next three years were modestly successful, with the charismatic George Ratterman at starting quarterback; the Bills finished with a winning record (losing in the AAFC Championship to the Browns) in 1947 and having .500 records in 1948 and 1949.

=== Exclusion from NFL ===
Program for the October 2, 1949 game against the Baltimore Colts. The Colts would be accepted into the NFL in 1950, the Bills would not.

There was some controversy over Buffalo's exclusion from the enlarged NFL. Buffalo had experienced more success on the field and at the gate than Baltimore, and was also a larger market at the time (and would not have to share their territory with an established team as Baltimore would with the Washington Redskins). Additionally, the original three-team plan would have left the league with 13 teams, not only an odd number and prime number that made making equal divisions impossible, but also one considered to be bad luck.

The move had left Buffalo as the only AAFC market without an NFL team post-merger, and one that had outdrawn the NFL average in fan attendance. With that in mind, Buffalo fans produced more than 15,000 season ticket pledges, raised $175,000 in a stock offering, and filed a separate application to join. When the vote to admit Buffalo was held on January 20, 1950, a majority of league owners (including the three already-admitted AAFC teams) were willing to accept Buffalo. However, league rules required a unanimous vote, but the vote was only 9-4 in favor.

The opposition to the Bills' entry was led by Chicago Bears owner George Halas (who had a longstanding animosity toward Buffalo's previous NFL franchise) and Los Angeles Rams owner Dan Reeves. League commissioner Bert Bell had already put out a schedule based on the 13 teams, and Reeves cited as his excuse for voting against admission was simply that "it was silly to vote in a new city without first having a good idea where my teams would be playing and when."

Breuil, having lost $700,000 on the team, was instead content to accept a one-fourth share of the Cleveland Browns. The team did, however, have another potential owner in Pat McGroder, then a successful liquor store owner and an advocate for the NFL's return to Buffalo. The NFL was not inclined to add a fourth team. The American Football League, a minor league formerly known as the "American Association," offered the Bills a spot in their league, but no Buffalo parties were interested in a minor league team.

Coming with Breuil to Cleveland were three Bills players; the rest were dispersed in the 1950 AAFC dispersal draft among the NFL teams, with the Colts and Green Bay Packers picking up the majority of the Bills' roster and Ratterman going to the New York Yanks. Ratterman would eventually finish his career with the Browns, as Otto Graham's backup and, briefly, successor.

As it turned out, admitting the Colts over the Bills proved to be a mistake — owing to inadequate stadium facilities, the Colts folded after only one season.

=== Connection with the AFL Bills ===
McGroder would continue to lobby for an NFL team in Buffalo for the next decade. In 1959, when the American Football League proposed establishing the franchise that would ultimately also bear the Buffalo Bills name, McGroder was the first potential owner that AFL founder Lamar Hunt approached. McGroder declined the offer, still hoping that the threat of the new AFL team would be enough to provoke the NFL to stop it with the Buffalo NFL team he had hoped to receive, but Ralph Wilson, whose bid for a Miami AFL team had fallen through, accepted the bid. When it became clear that the NFL would not expand to Buffalo as McGroder had hoped, he took a position within the modern Bills organization, remaining until his retirement in 1983.

The Bills entered the NFL with the rest of the AFL as part of 1970 merger and remain in current operations.

== Season records ==
Season records
Season	W	L	T	Finish	Playoff results
Buffalo Bisons
1946	3	10	1	3rd AAFC East	--
Buffalo Bills
1947	8	4	2	2nd AAFC East	--
1948	7	7	0	1st AAFC East	Won Eastern Division Championship (Colts); Lost AAFC Championship (Browns)
1949	5	5	2	4th AAFC	Lost First-round Game (Browns)
Totals	23	26	5		
