= 1944 Philadelphia Eagles season =

NFL team season

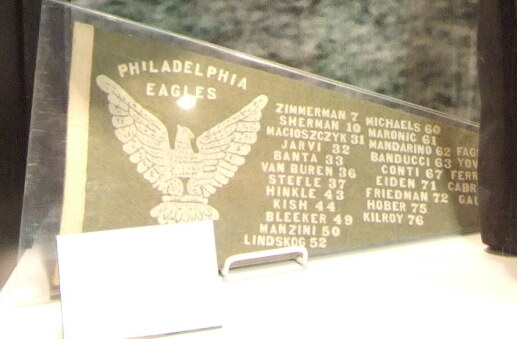
- Pennant of the 1944 roster
- Owner: Alexis Thompson
- General manager: Harry Thayer
- Head coach: Greasy Neale
- Home stadium: Shibe Park

Results
- Record: 7–1–2
- Division place: 2nd NFL Eastern
- Playoffs: Did not qualify

The 1944 Philadelphia Eagles season was their 12th in the league. The team improved on their previous output of 5–4–1, winning seven games. The team failed to qualify for the playoffs for the 12th consecutive season. It was the team's first winning record as the Eagles.

Rookie Mel Bleeker was the NFL's top receiver, as he played 9 games for the Eagles, starting three of them. He was second in the NFL in long reception (75), third in touchdowns (8; still the team's all-time rookie record) and yards/rushing attempt (5.3), fourth in yards from scrimmage (614), and sixth in points scored (48). He led the Eagles in touchdowns and scoring, despite having been primarily a blocking back in college.

== Off season ==
=== NFL draft ===
The 1944 NFL draft was held on April 19, 1944. The draft would be for 32 rounds. Again in round 2 and 4 only the 5 lowest wins teams from the 1943 season would pick. The Eagles would alternate with the Pittsburgh Steelers in picking either 4th or 9th in each round.

=== Player selections ===
The table shows the Eagles selections and what picks they had that were traded away and the team that ended up with that pick. It is possible the Eagles' pick ended up with this team via another team that the Eagles made a trade with. Not shown are acquired picks that the Eagles traded away.

| = Pro Bowler | = Hall of Famer |

| Rd | Pick | Player | Position | School | Rd | Pick | Player | Position | School |
|---|---|---|---|---|---|---|---|---|---|
| 1 | 5 | Steve Van Buren | Halfback | LSU | 2 | 15 | No Pick | | |
| 3 | 20 | Loren LaPrade | Guard | Stanford | 4 | 31 | No Pick | | |
| 5 | 36 | Joe Parker | End | Texas | 6 | 52 | Hillary Horne | Tackle | Mississippi State |
| 7 | 58 | Vic Kulbitski | Back | Minnesota | 8 | 74 | George Phillips | Back | UCLA |
| 9 | 80 | Paul Sarringhaus | Back | Ohio State | 10 | 96 | John Perko | Guard | Minnesota |
| 11 | 102 | Elliott Ormsbee | Back | Bradley | 12 | 118 | Earle Parsons | Back | USC |
| 13 | 124 | Bob Hanzlik | End | Wisconsin | 14 | 140 | Jim Talley | Center | Louisiana State |
| 15 | 146 | Dom Fusci | Tackle | South Carolina | 16 | 162 | Johnny Green | End | Tulsa |
| 17 | 168 | Jackie Freeman | Back | William & Mary | 18 | 184 | Joe Kane | Back | Pennsylvania |
| 19 | 190 | Tony Schiro | Guard | Santa Clara | 20 | 206 | Norm Michael | Back | Syracuse |
| 21 | 212 | Eddie Kulakowski | Tackle | West Virginia | 22 | 228 | Al Postus | Back | Villanova |
| 23 | 234 | Milt Smith | End | UCLA | 24 | 250 | Earl Klapstein | Tackle | Pacific |
| 25 | 256 | Bob Frisbee | Back | Stanford | 26 | 272 | Edmund Eiden | Back | Scranton |
| 27 | 278 | Barney Burdick | End | Creighton | 28 | 294 | Nick Daukas | Tackle | Dartmouth |
| 29 | 300 | Pasquale Darone | Guard | Boston College | 30 | 316 | Bill Clark | Tackle | Colorado College |
| 31 | 322 | Pete Pasko | End | East Stroudsburg | 32 | 328 | Myron Majewski | Tackle | American International |

== Schedule ==
| Week | Date | Opponent | Result | Record | Venue | Attendance |
|---|---|---|---|---|---|---|
| 1 | Bye | | | | | |
| 2 | September 26 | at **Boston Yanks** | **W** 28–7 | 1–0 | Fenway Park | 25,061 |
| 3 | Bye | | | | | |
| 4 | October 8 | **Washington Redskins** | **T** 31–31 | 1–0–1 | Shibe Park | 32,549 |
| 3 | October 22 | **Boston Yanks** | **W** 38–0 | 2–0–1 | Shibe Park | 24,638 |
| 4 | October 29 | at **New York Giants** | **W** 24–17 | 3–0–1 | Polo Grounds | 42,639 |
| 5 | November 5 | at **Brooklyn Tigers** | **W** 21–7 | 4–0–1 | Ebbets Field | 15,289 |
| 6 | November 12 | **New York Giants** | **T** 21–21 | 4–0–2 | Shibe Park | 33,248 |
| 7 | November 19 | at **Washington Redskins** | **W** 37–7 | 5–0–2 | Griffith Stadium | 35,540 |
| 8 | November 26 | Chicago Bears | **L** 7–28 | 5–1–2 | Shibe Park | 34,035 |
| 9 | December 3 | **Brooklyn Tigers** | **W** 34–0 | 6–1–2 | Shibe Park | 13,467 |
| 10 | December 10 | Cleveland Rams | **W** 26–13 | 7–1–2 | Shibe Park | 24,123 |
Note: Intra-division opponents are in **bold** text.

== Standings ==
NFL Eastern Division
| | W | L | T | PCT | DIV | PF | PA | STK |
|---|---|---|---|---|---|---|---|---|
| New York Giants | 8 | 1 | 1 | .889 | 6–1–1 | 206 | 75 | W4 |
| Philadelphia Eagles | 7 | 1 | 2 | .875 | 6–0–2 | 267 | 131 | W2 |
| Washington Redskins | 6 | 3 | 1 | .667 | 4–3–1 | 169 | 180 | L2 |
| Boston Yanks | 2 | 8 | 0 | .200 | 2–6 | 82 | 233 | L2 |
| Brooklyn Tigers | 0 | 10 | 0 | .000 | 0–8 | 69 | 166 | L10 |

Note: Tie games were not officially counted in the standings until 1972.

== Roster ==
(All time List of Philadelphia Eagles players in franchise history)

= 1944 Pro All-Star
- + = 1st team All-Star

| NO. | Player | AGE | POS | GP | GS | WT | HT | YRS | College |
|---|---|---|---|---|---|---|---|---|---|
| | Greasy Neale | 53 | Coach | _{1944 record} 7–1–2 | _{NFL-Eagles; Lifetime} 16–22–4 | | | 4th | West Virginia Wesleyan |
| | Bruno Banducci | 24 | G | 10 | 9 | 216 | 5–11 | Rookie | Stanford |
| | Jack Banta | 27 | HB | 7 | 2 | 191 | 5–11 | 3 | USC |
| | Mel Bleeker | 24 | HB | 9 | 3 | 189 | 5–11 | Rookie | USC |
| | Larry Cabrelli | 27 | E-DB | 9 | 9 | 194 | 5–11 | 3 | Colgate |
| | Rocco Canale | 27 | T-G | 9 | 1 | 240 | 5–11 | 1 | Boston College |
| | Enio Conti | 31 | G | 8 | 5 | 204 | 5–11 | 3 | _{Arkansas, Bucknell} |
| | John Durko | 30 | E | 6 | 0 | 235 | 6–4 | Rookie | Albright |
| | Carl Fagioli | 27 | G | 2 | 0 | 200 | 6–0 | Rookie | **none** |
| | Jack Ferrante | 28 | E-DE | 10 | 4 | 197 | 6–1 | 3 | **none** |
| | Bob Friedman | 23 | T | 10 | 8 | 215 | 6–2 | Rookie | Washington |
| | Charlie Gauer | 23 | FB-E | 7 | 4 | 213 | 6–2 | 1 | Colgate |
| | Jack Hinkle | 27 | B | 10 | 7 | 195 | 6–0 | 4 | Syracuse |
| | Toimi Jarvi | 24 | HB | 5 | 0 | 200 | 6–0 | Rookie | Northern Illinois |
| | Bucko Kilroy | 23 | G-MG-T-DT | 10 | 4 | 243 | 6–2 | 1 | _{Notre Dame, Temple} |
| | Ben Kish | 27 | B | 10 | 10 | 207 | 6–0 | 4 | Pittsburgh |
| | Ted Laux | 26 | HB-DB | 1 | 0 | 185 | 5–10 | 1 | St. Joseph's (PA) |
| | Vic Lindskog | 30 | C | 7 | 4 | 203 | 6–1 | Rookie | Stanford |
| | Art Macioszczyk | 24 | FB | 10 | 0 | 208 | 6–0 | Rookie | Western Michigan |
| | Mike Mandarino | 23 | T-C-G | 8 | 0 | 240 | 5–11 | Rookie | La Salle |
| | Bap Manzini | 24 | C | 10 | 6 | 195 | 5–11 | Rookie | St. Vincent |
| | Duke Maronic | 23 | G | 9 | 0 | 209 | 5–9 | Rookie | **none** |
| | Flip McDonald | 23 | E | 5 | 0 | 200 | 6–2 | Rookie | Oklahoma |
| | Eddie Michaels | 30 | G | 10 | 6 | 205 | 5–11 | 8 | Villanova |
| | Tom Miller | 26 | DE-E | 10 | 3 | 202 | 6–2 | 1 | Hampden-Sydney |
| | Walt Nowak | 29 | E | 2 | 0 | 185 | 5–11 | Rookie | Villanova |
| | Allie Sherman | 21 | QB | 10 | 0 | 170 | 5–11 | 1 | Brooklyn |
| | Ernie Steele | 27 | HB-DB | 9 | 2 | 187 | 6–0 | 2 | Washington |
| | Steve Van Buren+ | 24 | HB | 9 | 6 | 200 | 6–0 | Rookie | LSU |
| | Al Wistert+ | 24 | T-G-DT | 8 | 7 | 214 | 6–1 | 1 | Michigan |
| | John Yovicsin | 26 | DE | 1 | 0 | 195 | 6–3 | Rookie | Gettysburg |
| | Roy Zimmerman | 26 | QB-WB-K | 10 | 10 | 201 | 6–2 | 4 | San Jose State |
| | 31 Players; Team Average | 25.7 | | 10 | | 204.5 | 6–0.2 | 1.3 | |

- Link to all time List of Philadelphia Eagles players in franchise history
