= List of Fordham Rams in the NFL draft =

This is a list of Fordham Rams in the NFL Draft. In total the Rams have had 29 players in the NFL draft.

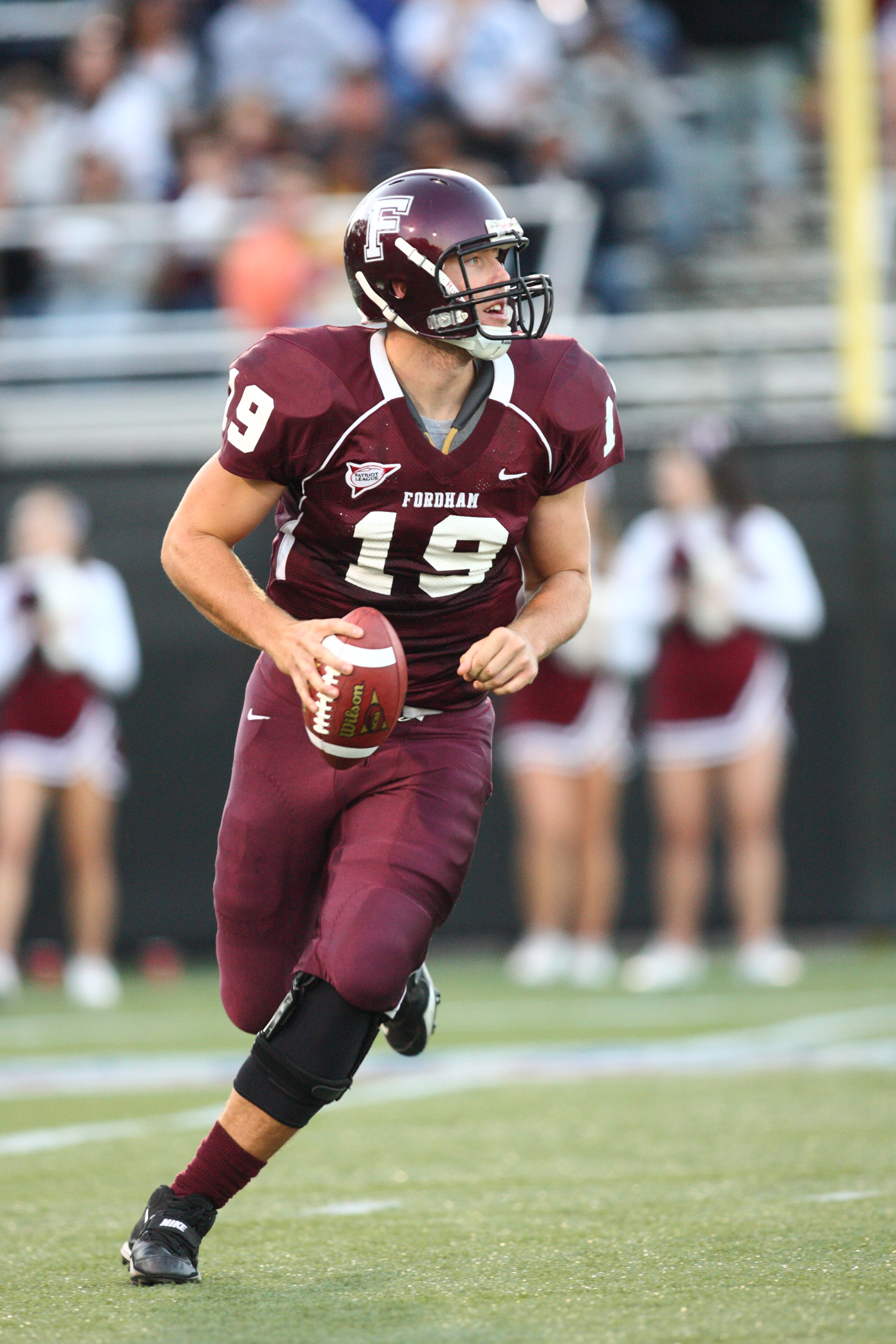
John Skelton is the third most recent draftee. He has most recently played for the Tennessee Titans.

== Key ==
B	Back	K	Kicker	NT	Nose tackle
C	Center	LB	Linebacker	FB	Fullback
DB	Defensive back	P	Punter	HB	Halfback
DE	Defensive end	QB	Quarterback	WR	Wide receiver
DT	Defensive tackle	RB	Running back	G	Guard
E	End	T	Offensive tackle	TE	Tight end

== Selections ==
Year	Round	Pick	Overall	Name	Team	Position
1936	6	4	49	Joe Maniaci	Brooklyn Dodgers	B
1938	1	6	6	Alex Wojciechowicz	Detroit Lions	C
1938	5	1	31	Ed Franco	Cleveland Rams	G
1938	5	5	35	Al Babartsky	Chicago Cardinals	T
1938	11	3	93	Johnny Druze	Brooklyn Dodgers	E
1939	19	1	171	Mike Kochel	Chicago Cardinals	G
1940	9	10	80	Dom Principe	New York Giants	B
1941	5	6	36	Len Eshmont	New York Giants	B
1941	6	7	47	Lou DeFilippo	New York Giants	C
1941	7	2	52	John Kuzman	Chicago Cardinals	T
1941	20	9	189	Joe Ungerer	Brooklyn Dodgers	T
1942	21	3	193	Jim Blumenstock	New York Giants	B
1943	1	6	6	Steve Filipowicz	New York Giants	B
1943	11	4	94	Joe Sabasteanski	Brooklyn Dodgers	C
1943	29	6	276	Stan Ritinski	New York Giants	E
1944	7	10	64	George Cheverko	Cleveland Rams	B
1944	11	10	108	Joe Andrejco	Cleveland Rams	B
1944	20	10	207	Joe Yackanich	Cleveland Rams	T
1944	25	5	257	Ben Babula	New York Giants	B
1945	10	9	96	Joe Sadonis	Philadelphia Eagles	T
1945	15	1	143	Tom Reilly	Brooklyn Dodgers	G
1945	21	11	219	Warren Fuller	Green Bay Packers	E
1945	26	4	267	Al Kull	Boston Yanks	T
1946	18	8	168	Bernie Millham	Philadelphia Eagles	E
1950	16	11	207	Jim Maloney	Los Angeles Rams	E
1951	16	11	194	Alan Pfeifer	New York Giants	E
1951	21	10	253	Larry Higgins	Chicago Bears	B
1955	12	9	142	Andy Nacrelli	Philadelphia Eagles	E
2010	5	24	155	John Skelton	Arizona Cardinals	QB
2018	4	34	134	Chase Edmonds	Arizona Cardinals	RB
2022	6	8	187	Nick Zakelj	San Francisco 49ers	T

Note: Kurt Sohn attended Fordham but not for 4 years. Sohn was a WR for the NY Jets from 1981 to 1988.
