= 1947 Buffalo Bills season =

American football team season

1947 Buffalo Bills (AAFC) season
- Head coach: Red Dawson
- Home stadium: Civic Stadium

Results
- Record: 8–4–2
- Division place: 2nd AAFC East
- Playoffs: did not qualify

The 1947 Buffalo Bills season was their second in the All-America Football Conference. The team improved on their previous output of 3-10-1, winning eight games. Despite the improvement, they failed to qualify for the playoffs for the second consecutive season.

The team's statistical leaders included George Ratterman with 1,840 passing yards, Chet Mutryn with 868 rushing yards and 73 points scored, and Al Baldwin with 468 receiving yards.

Although the All-America Football Conference was integrated from its inception, the 1947 Bills did not have a single black player on their roster.

== Season schedule ==
Game	Date	Opponent	Result	Record	Venue	Attendance	Recap	Sources
1	August 31	**New York Yankees**	**W** 28–24	1–0	Civic Stadium	32,385	Recap	
2	September 5	at Cleveland Browns	**L** 14–30	1–1	Cleveland Municipal Stadium	63,263	Recap	
3	September 14	Chicago Rockets	**W** 28–20	2–1	Civic Stadium	33,648	Recap	
4	September 19	at Chicago Rockets	**W** 31–14	3–1	Soldier Field	22,685	Recap	
5	September 28	San Francisco 49ers	**L** 24–41	3–2	Civic Stadium	36,099	Recap	
6	October 5	at Los Angeles Dons	**W** 27–25	4–2	Los Angeles Memorial Coliseum	36,087	Recap	
7	October 12	**Baltimore Colts**	**W** 20–15	5–2	Civic Stadium	27,345	Recap	
8	October 17	at **Brooklyn Dodgers**	**T** 14–14	5–2–1	Ebbets Field	9,792	Recap	
9	October 26	**Brooklyn Dodgers**	**W** 35–7	6–2–1	Civic Stadium	23,762	Recap	
10	November 2	Cleveland Browns	**L** 7–28	6–3–1	Civic Stadium	43,167	Recap	
11	November 9	Los Angeles Dons	**W** 25–0	7–3–1	Civic Stadium	21,293	Recap	
—	Bye							
12	November 23	at **Baltimore Colts**	**W** 33–14	8–3–1	Municipal Stadium	19,593	Recap	
13	November 30	at **New York Yankees**	**L** 13–35	8–4–1	Yankee Stadium	39,012	Recap	
14	December 7	at San Francisco 49ers	**T** 21–21	8–4–2	Kezar Stadium	22,943	Recap	
Note: Intra-division opponents are in **bold** text.

== Division standings ==
AAFC Eastern Division
	W	L	T	PCT	DIV	PF	PA	STK
New York Yankees	11	2	1	.846	5–1	378	239	W2
Buffalo Bills	8	4	2	.667	4–1–1	320	288	T1
Brooklyn Dodgers	3	10	1	.231	1–4–1	181	340	L3
Baltimore Colts	2	11	1	.154	1–5	167	377	L1

Note: Tie games were not officially counted in the standings.

== Roster ==
1947 Buffalo Bills final roster
Backs: 57 Al Baldwin S/WR; 88 Steve Juzwik K/RB; 84 George Koch CB/RB; 72 Vic Kulbitski FB/LB; 74 Pug Manders FB/LB; 83 Chet Mutryn CB/RB; 61 George Ratterman QB/S; 86 Julie Rykovich RB/CB; 62 George Terlep S/QB; 87 Lou Tomasetti RB/LB; 82 Alex Wizbicki FB/LB	Linemen/Linebackers: 43 Graham Armstrong T/K; 45 Jack Carpenter T; 23 Bert Corley C; 44 George Doherty T; 42 Gil Duggan T/DT; 36 George Groves G/LB; 22 Joe Haynes C/LB; 73 Ed Hirsch LB/FB; 46 John Kerns DT/T; 41 Chet Kozel DT/T; 32 Hal Lahar G/DG; 35 Rocco Pirro G/DG; 21 Felto Prewitt LB/C; 37 Vince Scott G/DG	Ends/Receivers: 53 Marty Comer; 54 Al Coppage; 52 Paul Gibson; 51 Fay King; 55 Ray Kuffel; 58 Vince Mazza; Special teams: 63 Albie Reisz P/S; Reserve: 56 Jack Morton DE/WR (IR); rookies in italics
