= Bert Corley =

American football player (1920–1988)

- Bert Corley, 1942

No. 23, 22
- Position: Center

Personal information
- Born: September 9, 1920; Okolona, Mississippi, U.S.
- Died: September 22, 1988 (aged 68); Tupelo, Mississippi, U.S.
- Listed height: 6 ft 2 in (1.88 m)
- Listed weight: 210 lb (95 kg)

Career information
- High school: Okolona
- College: Mississippi State (1940-1942, 1946)
- NFL draft: 1944: 14th round, 136th overall pick

Career history
- Buffalo Bills (1947); Baltimore Colts (1948)

Career AAFC statistics
- Games played: 22
- Games started: 12
- Stats at Pro Football Reference

Elbert Ellis Corley (September 9, 1920 – September 22, 1988), sometimes referred to as Mel Corley and "Mule" Corley, was an American football player who played at the center position.

Corley was born in 1920 in Okolona, Mississippi. He attended Mississippi State University where he played college football from 1940 to 1942 and 1946.

Corley was selected by the New York Giants in the 14th round (136th overall pick) of the 1944 NFL draft. He opted instead to sign with the Buffalo Bills of the All-America Football Conference (AAFC). The Buffalo News in August 1947 described him as "the roughest man on the squad" and wrote that he "looks like Robert Taylor and throws his weight around like he has a grudge against the world." He played on both offense and defense, playing all 60 minutes against the San Francisco 49ers. In all, he appeared in 14 games (four as a starter) for the 1947 Bills.

In July 1948, the Bills traded Corley to the Baltimore Colts in exchange for Marshall Shurnas. 1948, appearing in nine games, all of them as a starter.

Corley retired from professional football on November 3, 1948, in order to tend to his general store in Okolona. He died in Okolona in 1988 at age 68.
