= Daukas =

Daukas is a surname. Notable people with the surname include:

- Lou Daukas (1921–2005), American football player
- Nick Daukas (1922–2003), American football player

== See also ==
- Daukaus
