= Jack Baldwin (American football) =

American football player (1921–1989)

- Baldwin, c. 1941

No. 21, 25, 23, 32
- Positions: Center, linebacker

Personal information
- Born: July 31, 1921; Clyde, Texas, U.S.
- Died: September 13, 1989 (aged 68); East Ely, Nevada, U.S.
- Listed height: 6 ft 3 in (1.91 m)
- Listed weight: 223 lb (101 kg)

Career information
- High school: Gladwater (TX)
- College: Centenary (1940-1941)
- NFL draft: 1944: 24th round, 243rd overall pick

Career history
- New York Yankees (1946-1947); San Francisco 49ers (1947); Buffalo Bills (1948); Edmonton Eskimos (1949)

Career AAFC statistics
- Games played: 15
- Games started: 3
- Stats at Pro Football Reference

John David Baldwin (July 31, 1921 – September 13, 1989) was an American football player who played at the center and linebacker positions. He played college football for Centenary in Louisiana and professional football for the New York Yankees, San Francisco 49ers, Buffalo Bills, and Edmonton Eskimos.

== Early life ==
Baldwin was born in 1921 in Clyde, Texas. He attended and played football at Gladewater High School in Gladewater, Texas. He also set a record in the javelin throw while attending Gladewater High.

== College football and military service ==
Baldwin played college football for Centenary in 1940 and 1941. He worked during the summer as a pipe liner in the oil fields. His college career was interrupted by service in the United States Army Air Forces during World War II. he entered the Army Air Forces in December 1942.

== Professional football ==
He was selected by the Brooklyn Tigers in the 24th round (243rd overall pick) of the 1944 NFL draft. He played in the All-America Football Conference (AAFC) for the New York Yankees (1946-1947), San Francisco 49ers (1947), and Buffalo Bills (1948). He appeared in 17 AAFC games. He also played in the Canadian Football League for the Edmonton Eskimos for 10 games during the 1949 season.

== Family and later years ==
Baldwin moved to White Pine County, Nevada, in 1962. He was employed as the manager at Nevada Distributing from 1962 to 1973 and head of security for Kennecott Copper from 1973 to 1982. He died in 1989 at age 68 in East Ely, Nevada.
