= John Perko =

John Perko may refer to:

- John Perko (American football, born 1914) (1914–1973), American football guard and center for the Pittsburgh Pirates, Card-Pitt and the Pittsburgh Steelers
- John Perko (American football, born 1918) (1918–1984), American football offensive guard for the Buffalo Bisons
