= Joe Magliolo =

American football player (1922–2008)

No. 62
- Positions: Quarterback, defensive back, guard, linebacker

Personal information
- Born: October 17, 1922; Galveston, Texas, U.S.
- Died: July 31, 2008 (aged 85); Houston, Texas, U.S.
- Listed height: 6 ft 0 in (1.83 m)
- Listed weight: 210 lb (95 kg)

Career information
- High school: Ball (Galveston)
- College: Texas (1942-1943, 1947)
- NFL draft: 1944: 17th round, 165th overall pick

Career history
- New York Yankees (1948)

Awards and highlights
- First-team All-SWC (1943)

Career AAFC statistics
- Interceptions: 1
- Stats at Pro Football Reference

Joseph Magliolo Jr. (October 17, 1922 - July 31, 2008) was an American college and professional football player. He was a two-time All-American honorable mention, once as a "blocking back" and once as a guard, who played in Texas' first two bowl games and then played a season for the New York Yankees of the AAFC.

== Early life ==
Magliolo was born in Galveston in 1922, the son of Italian immigrants. There he played football and tennis at Ball High School.

== College football ==
Magliolo started school at Texas in 1939 and from 1940 to 1942 he came out for spring football practice, but it wasn't until the fall of 1942, when World War II created a shortage of players, that he tried out for the varsity. That season, despite being an unheralded high school player whose parents didn't want him to play, Magliolo became Coach Dana X. Bible's choice for starting quarterback, or "blocking back", at the beginning of the season. At the time, Texas was utilizing the single-wing formation in which the quarterback didn't pass or control the ball as much as the quarterback does in modern football, and was often called the "blocking back." The work of taking snaps and throwing the ball was primarily handled by the fullback, who in 1942 was Roy McKay. Later in the season, when the Longhorns began playing against pass-oriented offenses in the Southwest Conference, William Harold "Spot" Collins became the starter because he was seen as the better pass defender and players went both ways at the time. Still, with platoon football, Magliolo saw considerable playing time right through to the 1943 Cotton Bowl. Texas went 9-2 and won the Southwest Conference championship to finish ranked #11 in the country. They played in, and won, the school's first ever bowl game with a 14–7 win over Georgia Tech in the 1943 Cotton Bowl.

In 1943, Magliolo was named one of three team captains for the Longhorns, and the starting quarterback. That season, the Longhorns went 7–1–1, posted the school's first ever repeat conference championship, finished ranked #14 and tied Randolph Field in the 1944 Cotton Bowl. That season, he was an all-conference selection as a back and an All-American honorable mention.

After leaving school to serve in the Navy for two years, where he was an executive officer on a PT boat in the Philippines during World War II, Magliolo returned to Texas in 1946. He was considered the team's best blocking and defensive back, but four games into the season, he broke his arm in the Oklahoma game and missed the end of the season. Despite the short season for him, he made Wirt Gammon's All-American Blockers team that year.

In 1947, the Longhorns switched to the T-formation which did not need a blocking back, and Magliolo was moved to left guard. Despite the change in position, he was 3rd Team All-Southwest Conference and an honorable mention All-American as the Longhorns went 10–1. They finished ranked #5 and beat Alabama in the 1948 Sugar Bowl.

During his time on the team, the Longhorns went 34–6–1. In 1988, he was inducted into the University of Texas Hall of Honor.

== Pro football ==
Magliolo was first drafted by the Chicago Cardinals in the 17th round of the 1944 NFL draft. He never signed with them and instead went off to war. He was then drafted by the New York Yankees of the All-America Football Conference in the 15th round of the 1948 AAFC Draft and played one season for them that year. He played defensive back, recording one interception in 13 games. Magliolo spent much of the 1948 season on the sideline due to injuries, and, in July 1949, he informed the team that he was retiring from professional football to pursue a business career near Galveston, Texas.

== Later life ==
Magliolo earned a chemical engineering degree from Texas in 1948 and a master's degree in 1949. In 1950, he went to work for Monsanto where he spent 27 years as a chemical engineer. In 1980, he purchased the Bay Area Racquet Club near the Johnson Space Center in Clear Lake, Texas and became an advocate for local tennis.
