= 1948 Baltimore Colts season =

American football team season

1948 Baltimore Colts (1947–1950) season
- Head coach: Cecil Isbell
- Home stadium: Memorial Stadium

Results
- Record: 7–7
- Division place: Tied 1st AAFC East
- Playoffs: Lost Divisional Playoff (vs. Bills) 17–28

The 1948 Baltimore Colts season was their third in the AAFC and their second in Baltimore. The team improved on their previous season's output of 2–11–1, winning seven games. They qualified for the playoffs for the first and only time in their five-year franchise history (dating back to their days as the Miami Seahawks).

The team's statistical leaders included Y. A. Tittle with 2,522 passing yards, Bus Mertes with 680 rushing yards, and Billy Hillenbrand with 970 receiving yards and 78 points scored.

== Season schedule ==
Game	Date	Opponent	Result	Record	Venue	Attendance	Recap	Sources
1	September 5	**New York Yankees**	**W** 45–28	1–0	Municipal Stadium	31,800	Recap	
2	September 10	at Chicago Rockets	**L** 14–21	1–1	Soldier Field	14,642	Recap	
3	September 16	at **New York Yankees**	**W** 27–14	2–1	Yankee Stadium	18,959	Recap	
4	September 26	**Brooklyn Dodgers**	**W** 35–20	3–1	Municipal Stadium	34,554	Recap	
5	October 5	Cleveland Browns	**L** 10–14	3–2	Municipal Stadium	22,359	Recap	
6	October 10	San Francisco 49ers	**L** 14–56	3–3	Municipal Stadium	37,209	Recap	
7	October 15	at Los Angeles Dons	**W** 29–14	4–3	L.A. Memorial Coliseum	40,019	Recap	
8	October 24	at San Francisco 49ers	**L** 10–21	4–4	Kezar Stadium	27,978	Recap	
9	October 31	at **Buffalo Bills**	**L** 17–35	4–5	Civic Stadium	23,694	Recap	
10	November 7	at Cleveland Browns	**L** 7–28	4–6	Cleveland Stadium	32,314	Recap	
11	November 14	Chicago Rockets	**W** 38–24	5–6	Municipal Stadium	21,899	Recap	
12	November 21	Los Angeles Dons	**L** 14–17	5–7	Municipal Stadium	25,228	Recap	
13	November 28	at **Brooklyn Dodgers**	**W** 38–20	6–7	Ebbets Field	7,629	Recap	
14	December 5	**Buffalo Bills**	**W** 35–15	7–7	Municipal Stadium	33,090	Recap	
Note: Intra-division opponents are in **bold** text.

== Division standings ==
Program for the Colts' 1948 season opener against the New York Yankees.

AAFC Eastern Division
	W	L	T	PCT	DIV	PF	PA	STK
Buffalo Bills	7	7	0	.500	4–2	360	358	L1
Baltimore Colts	7	7	0	.500	5–1	333	327	W2
New York Yankees	6	8	0	.429	3–3	265	301	W1
Brooklyn Dodgers	2	12	0	.143	0–6	253	387	L6

Note: Tie games were not officially counted in the standings.

== Playoff schedule ==
Round	Date	Opponent	Result	Venue	Attendance	Recap	Sources
Division	December 12	Buffalo Bills	L 17–28	Municipal Stadium	27,325	Recap	

== Roster ==
Quarterbacks

- 63 Y. A. Tittle
- 66 Charlie O'Rourke P

Backs

- 51 Lamar Davis S/WR
- 73 Bus Mertes FB/LB
- 80 Aubrey Fowler CB/RB
- 81 Jake Leicht CB/RB
- 82 Billy Hillenbrand RB/CB
- 83 John Sylvester CB
- 85 Bob Pfohl RB
- 87 Johnny Vardian S/RB
- 89 Lu Gambino FB/LB

Ends

- 52 Bob Nowaskey
- 53 Win Williams
- 54 Ollie Poole
- 55 Johnny North
- 56 Joe Smith
- 57 Hub Bechtol

Reserve

- 22 Bert Corley C/LB (Retired)
- 35 Barry French G/MG (IR)
- 88 Lew Mayne RB (IR)

Linemen/Linebackers

- 20 Ralph Stewart LB
- 22 Herb Coleman C
- 28 Len McCormick C/LB
- 30 Dub Garrett G/MG
- 31 Dick Barwegen G/LB
- 32 Jack Simmons G
- 33 Ed Grain G/T
- 38 Al Klug G
- 41 Ernie Blandin T
- 44 Lee Artoe DT/T
- 46 Jim Spruill T
- 47 Pete Berezney T/DT
- 48 John Mellus DT
- 49 Al Sidorik G/LB
- 67 Sam Vacanti LB
- 74 Rex Grossman LB/K
- 77 Spiro Dellerba LB/FB
