= Ed Grain =

American football player (1922–1984)

- Grain at Baltimore Polytechnic in 1939

No. 37, 45, 33
- Position: Guard

Personal information
- Born: February 25, 1922; Baltimore, Maryland, U.S.
- Died: October 6, 1984 (aged 62); Evanston, Illinois, U.S.
- Listed height: 6 ft 0 in (1.83 m)
- Listed weight: 230 lb (104 kg)

Career information
- High school: Baltimore Polytechnic Institute
- College: Penn (1940-1942, 1946)
- NFL draft: 1947: 7th round, 46th overall pick

Career history
- New York Yankees (1947); Baltimore Colts (1947-1948)

Career AAFC statistics
- Games played: 23
- Games started: 3
- Stats at Pro Football Reference

Edwin Elswin "Bud" Grain III (February 25, 1922 – October 6, 1984) was an American football player who played at the guard position. He played college football for Penn Quakers football in 1942 and 1946 and professional football for the New York Yankees in 1947 and the Baltimore Colts in 1947 and 1948.

== Early life ==
A native of Baltimore, he attended the Baltimore Polytechnic Institute (BPI). He was a star athlete in wrestling, lacrosse, and football while at BPI. He was selected as an All-Maryland three consecutive seasons and at three different positions (tackle, guard, and fullback).

== College football and military service ==
He attended the University of Pennsylvania where he played college football for the Penn Quakers football team in 1942 and also wrestled in the heavyweight class. During World War II, he served as a captain in the Army Air Forces and flew over 50 missions as a B-24 navigator in the Pacific Theatre. He was involved in two crash landings and also was hit in the back with flak. After the war, he was selected as the captain of the 1946 Penn Quakers football team.

== Professional football ==
He was selected by the Detroit Lions in the seventh round (46th overall pick) of the 1947 NFL draft. He opted instead to play in the All-America Football Conference (AAFC) for the New York Yankees in 1947. In late September 1947, he was purchased by the Baltimore Colts. He played for the Colts during their 1947 and 1948 seasons. He appeared in a total of 23 AAFC games, three as a starter.
