= Bill Reinhard =

American football player (1922–2016)

No. 60, 88
- Positions: Defensive back, running back, return specialist

Personal information
- Born: May 17, 1922; Los Angeles, California, U.S.
- Died: January 30, 2016 (aged 93); Palm Desert, California, U.S.
- Listed height: 5 ft 10 in (1.78 m)
- Listed weight: 168 lb (76 kg)

Career information
- High school: Glendale (Glendale, California)
- College: California (1940-1942, 1946)
- NFL draft: 1944: 23rd round, 237th overall pick

Career history

Playing
- Los Angeles Dons (1947-1948)

Coaching
- Glendale (CA) (1949–1957) Head coach

Career AAFC statistics
- Interceptions: 5
- Punt return yards: 298
- Touchdowns: 3
- Stats at Pro Football Reference

Head coaching record
- Career: 36–40–5 (.475)

Carl William Reinhard (May 17, 1922 – January 30, 2016) was an American professional football player and coach. He played professionally in the All-America Football Conference (AAFC) for the Los Angeles Dons. Born in Los Angeles, Reinhard played college football at the University of California, Berkeley and was selected in the 23rd round of the 1944 NFL draft by the Washington Redskins. His brother Bob Reinhard also played in the AAFC. Reinhard served as the head football coach at Glendale Community College in Glendale, California from 1949 to 1957.

Reinhard died in January 2016 at the age of 93.

== Head coaching record ==
Year	Team	Overall	Conference	Standing	Bowl/playoffs
Glendale Vaqueros (Western State Conference) (1949–1957)
1949	Glendale	3–5–1	2–3	5th	
1950	Glendale	5–4	2–3	4th	
1951	Glendale	2–7–1	0–3–1	5th	
1952	Glendale	5–4	3–2	3rd	
1953	Glendale	5–3–1	3–1–1	2nd	
1954	Glendale	3–4–1	2–2	3rd	
1955	Glendale	3–7	1–4	5th	
1956	Glendale	5–4	3–2	3rd	
1957	Glendale	5–2–1	3–2–1	4th	
Glendale:		36–40–5	19–22–3		
Total:		36–40–5			
