= Paul Mitchell (American football) =

American football player (1920–2017)

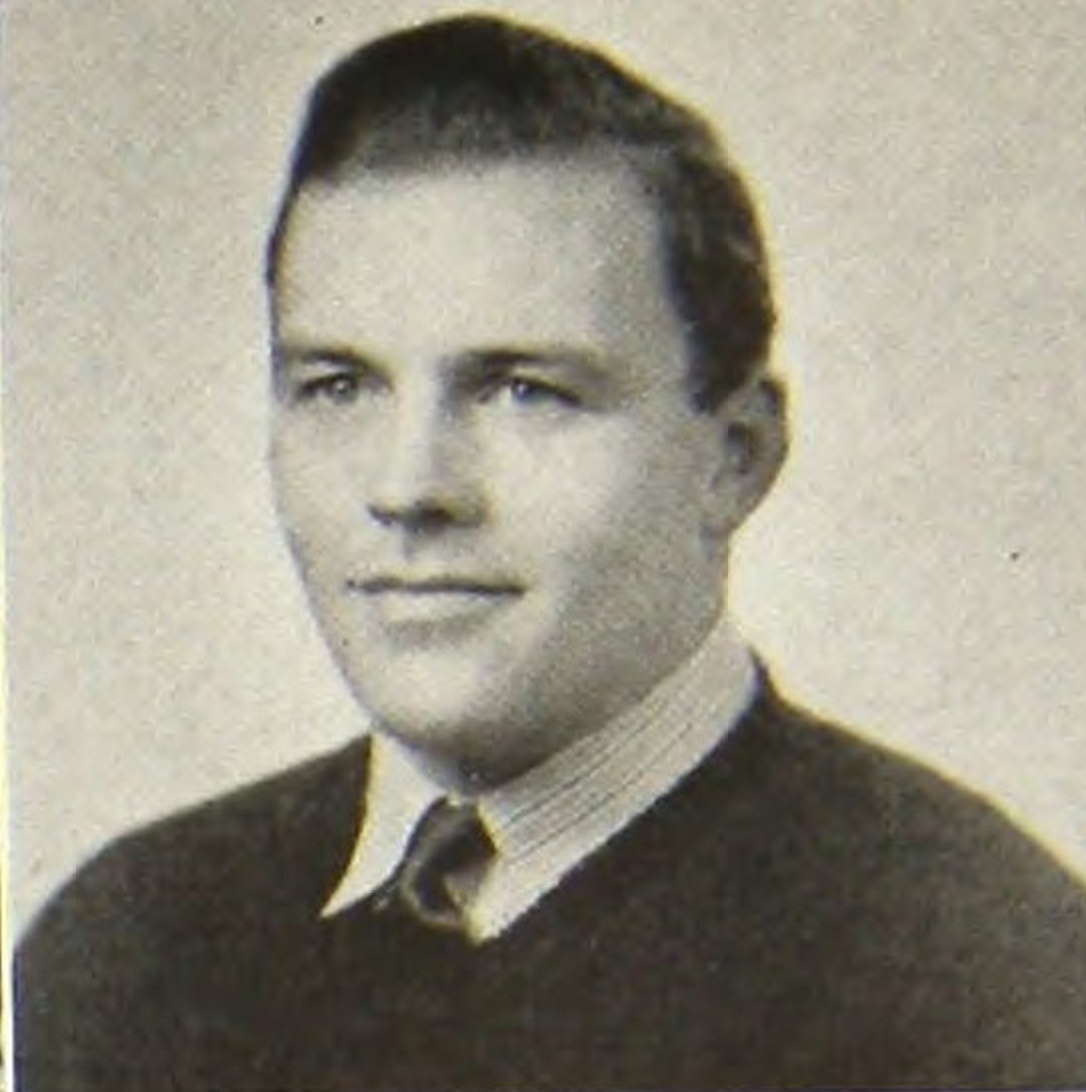
- Mitchell c. 1942 at the University of Minnesota

No. 35, 43, 46, 59, 47
- Positions: Defensive end, tackle

Personal information
- Born: August 10, 1920; Minneapolis, Minnesota U.S.
- Died: March 11, 2017 (aged 96); Palos Verdes Peninsula, California, U.S.
- Listed height: 6 ft 3 in (1.91 m)
- Listed weight: 235 lb (107 kg)

Career information
- High school: Edison (Minneapolis)
- College: Minnesota (1940-1943)
- NFL draft: 1944: 2nd round, 12th overall pick

Career history
- Los Angeles Dons (1946–1948); New York Yankees (1948–1949); New York Yanks (1950–1951)

Awards and highlights
- 2× National champion (1940, 1941); First-team All-Big Ten (1943)

Career NFL/AAFC statistics
- Games played: 69
- Starts: 20
- Fumble recoveries: 1
- Stats at Pro Football Reference

Paul Anthony Mitchell (August 10, 1920 – March 11, 2017) was an American football defensive end and tackle who played two seasons with the New York Yanks of the National Football League (NFL) and two seasons with the Los Angeles Dons of the All-America Football Conference (AAFC) and won a National Championship with the Minnesota Gophers in 1941.

== Biography ==
Mitchell's parents had immigrated from Lithuania and Paul learned to speak English at school.

Mitchell in 1946 as a rookie with the Los Angeles Dons.

He played college football at the University of Minnesota where he was an All-American and had previously attended Edison High School in Minneapolis, Minnesota. At Minnesota he was named to many All-Big Ten and All American teams and was on the Minnesota '41 National Championship Team. He graduated with a Mechanical Engineering degree. He married Minnesota cheerleader and Miss Minnesota Ingrid Vallo, who also worked as a fashion model.

Mitchell was drafted in the second round of the 1944 NFL Draft (12th overall). He went to serve as a Lieutenant in the Navy during World War II.

After returning he played two full seasons of professional football with the Dons and was traded to the Yanks during the 1948 season. He played with the Yanks for the rest of that season and then three more seasons. In between seasons, he sold Goodyear Tires

After leaving football he worked for the Garrett Corporation (now AlliedSignal/Honeywell) until he retired in 1985 and started his own real estate company in California.

Mitchell died in March 2017 at the age of 96.

He is a member of the University of Minnesota Hall of Fame.
