= Don Griffin (halfback) =

American football player (1922–2005)

No. 49, 99
- Positions: Halfback, defensive back

Personal information
- Born: October 15, 1922; Benton Harbor, Michigan, U.S.
- Died: January 17, 2005 (aged 82); Aurora, Illinois, U.S.
- Listed height: 5 ft 11 in (1.80 m)
- Listed weight: 190 lb (86 kg)

Career information
- College: Illinois (1940-1942)
- NFL draft: 1944: 14th round, 137th overall pick

Career history
- Chicago Rockets (1946); Baltimore Colts (1947)*
- * Offseason or practice squad member only

Career AAFC statistics
- Rushing yards: 13
- Rushing average: 0.5
- Receptions: 5
- Receiving yards: 28
- Stats at Pro Football Reference

Don Griffin (born Donald Dean Griffin) was a professional American football halfback. He was a member of the Chicago Rockets of the All-America Football Conference (AAFC).
