= Fay King (American football) =

American football player (1922–1983)

No. 51, 55
- Position: End

Personal information
- Born: April 7, 1922; Alton, Alabama, U.S.
- Died: June 5, 1983 (aged 61); Lincolnton, Georgia, U.S.
- Listed height: 6 ft 2 in (1.88 m)
- Listed weight: 195 lb (88 kg)

Career information
- High school: Lanier (GA)
- College: Georgia (1942)
- NFL draft: 1946: 7th round, 60th overall pick

Career history
- Buffalo Bisons/Buffalo Bills (1946-1947); Chicago Rockets/Hornets (1948-1949)

Career AAFC statistics
- Receptions: 115
- Receiving yards: 1,583
- Touchdowns: 20
- Stats at Pro Football Reference

Henry Lafayette King (April 7, 1922 – June 5, 1983) was an American football player who played four seasons in the All-America Football Conference. "Fay" King played college football at the University of Georgia. He was drafted by the Rams of the National Football League in the seventh round of the 1946 NFL draft.
