= Jim Callahan (American football, born 1920) =

American football player (1920–1998)

No. 88
- Position: Back

Personal information
- Born: December 19, 1920; El Paso, Texas, U.S.
- Died: March 27, 1978 (aged 57); El Paso, Texas, U.S.
- Listed height: 5 ft 11 in (1.80 m)
- Listed weight: 185 lb (84 kg)

Career information
- High school: Wink (Wink, Texas)
- College: Texas Tech; Texas
- NFL draft: 1944: 2nd round, 13th overall pick

Career history
- Detroit Lions (1946)

Awards and highlights
- First-team All-SWC (1943); 1942 All-Conference (Border Conference); 1944 Cotton Bowl Classic Champion; 1943 Southwest Conference Champion; 1942 Border Conference Champion

Career NFL statistics
- Passing yards: 359
- TD–INT: 2-7
- Passer rating: 22.1
- Stats at Pro Football Reference

James Ross Callahan (December 19, 1920 – March 27, 1998) was an American football player who played college football at Texas Tech and the University of Texas and then professionally for the Detroit Tigers - all in the 1940s.

== Early life ==
Born in El Paso, Texas, Callahan attended Wink High School where he played football and basketball, ran track and threw both the discus and the javelin. He helped lead Wink's football team to a 29 game winning streak and he finished second in the discus at the 1940 Texas state high school track meet.

== College career ==
After being recruited by Texas, TCU, Texas Tech and the Naval Academy, Callahan chose to play at Tech. In his Sophomore season he helped Tech to a 9-2 record and a trip to the 1942 Sun Bowl. The next year he helped them win a share of the 1942 Border Conference championship and was named all-conference. He also played basketball for Tech, but not track as they did not have a track team that season. Going into 1943 he was voted co-captain of the team.

After the start of World War II, Callahan had joined the Navy and in August 1943 he was called to duty and transferred to Texas for V-5 pre-flight training. In October he was given permission by the Navy to play football for Texas, which he did and was called Texas' "lend-lease fullback" as a result. He immediately contributed with his rushing, receiving, kicking and blocking; scoring four touchdowns in his first 3 games. Despite missing the first three games of the season, he finished the season as the Southwest Conference's 2nd leading scoring and made the AP's All-Southwest Conference first team. The team went 7-1. won the conference championship and played to a 7-7 tie against Randolph Field and its team of all-stars in the 1944 Cotton Bowl Classic.

As soon as the season ended, he was shipped off to Athens, GA for Naval Pre-Flight school where he excelled on the obstacle course and in the classroom.

== Professional career ==
He was selected by the Brooklyn Tigers in the second round (13th overall pick) of the 1944 NFL draft, but had to miss two seasons in the NFL due to his military service.

By the time he returned, the Tigers had ceased to exist as an NFL franchise and he was signed by the Detroit Lions. A foot injury limited his playing time during the 1946 season, and he only played in 9 games for the Lions. He returned to the Lions in 1947, but was injured in training camp, went on the injured reserve list, was released and then returned to Tech to get his degree.

== Later life ==
After finishing his football career and graduating, he worked as a sales manager of a Lubbock car dealership and then at the University of New Mexico in Albuquerque.

After a round of golf in El Paso in March 1978, he suffered a fatal heart attack and died at 57 years old.

In 1999, Odessa American newspaper named him the 20th Century's best high school football player from the Permian Basin.
