= Marion Flanagan =

American football player (1924–2002)

Texas A&M Aggies
- Positions: Halfback, quarterback, fullback

Personal information
- Born: March 27, 1924; Sweetwater, Texas, U.S.
- Died: March 1, 2002 (age 77); Fullerton, California, U.S.
- Listed weight: 170 lb (77 kg)

Career information
- College: Texas A&M (1942–1943, 1946)

Awards and highlights
- Second-team All-SWC (1943); NCAA receiving leader (1942)

Marion Don Flanagan (March 27, 1924 – March 1, 2002) was an American football player. He was born in Sweetwater, Texas, played high school football there, and was one of the top high school players in the state. He played college football for the Texas A&M Aggies football team as a halfback, quarterback, and fullback from 1942 to 1943 and in 1946. He led the NCAA major colleges in 1942 with 403 receiving yards. Flanagan sustained a knee injury in 1943 that prematurely ended his season, nonetheless he was named 2nd Team All-Southwest Conference. After the 1943 season, Flanagan spent two-and-a-half years serving in the United States Navy during World War II. After his discharge, he returned to Texas A&M and was one of the leading punt returners in the 1946 season. He opted not to return to football in 1947, stating that he was retiring from the game due to the lingering impact of the knee injury he sustained in 1943. In September 1947, Flanagan married Janette Butts. He also served as an assistant football coach at Texas A&M in 1947.

== See also ==
- List of NCAA major college football yearly receiving leaders
- List of NCAA major college yearly punt and kickoff return leaders
