= Bob Sneddon =

American football player (1921–2012)

No. 15, 20, 97
- Positions: Defensive back, halfback

Personal information
- Born: July 9, 1921; Ogden, Utah, U.S.
- Died: January 24, 2012 (aged 90); Sandy, Utah, U.S.
- Listed height: 5 ft 10 in (1.78 m)
- Listed weight: 180 lb (82 kg)

Career information
- High school: Ogden
- College: Weber State (1940); Saint Mary's (CA) (1941)
- NFL draft: 1944: 10th round, 94th overall pick

Career history
- Washington Redskins (1944); Detroit Lions (1945); Los Angeles Dons (1946)

Career NFL/AAFC statistics
- Rushing yards: 36
- Rushing average: 2.1
- Receptions: 5
- Receiving yards: 53
- Interceptions: 2
- Stats at Pro Football Reference

Robert Lee Sneddon (July 9, 1921 – January 24, 2012) was an American football defensive back and halfback who played in the National Football League (NFL) for the Washington Redskins and the Detroit Lions. Sneddon also played in the All-America Football Conference (AAFC) for the Los Angeles Dons. He played college football at Saint Mary's College of California and was selected 94th overall in the tenth round of the 1944 NFL draft. Sneddon died in Sandy, Utah in 2012 at the age of 90.
