= Ted Ossowski =

American football player (1922–1965)

No. 46
- Position: Offensive tackle

Personal information
- Born: May 12, 1922; Beatrice, Nebraska, U.S.
- Died: August 21, 1965 (aged 43); Contra Costa County, California, U.S.
- Listed height: 6 ft 0 in (1.83 m)
- Listed weight: 218 lb (99 kg)

Career information
- College: Oregon State; USC
- NFL draft: 1944: 16th round, 160th overall pick

Career history
- New York Yankees (1947)

Career AAFC statistics
- Games played: 3
- Stats at Pro Football Reference

Theodore Leroy Ossowski (May 12, 1922 - August 21, 1965) was an American football tackle in the All-America Football Conference (AAFC) for the New York Yankees. He played college football at Oregon State University and the University of Southern California.
