= John Batorski =

American football player (1920–1982)

No. 54
- Position: End

Personal information
- Born: September 27, 1920; Lackawanna, New York, U.S.
- Died: November 16, 1982 (aged 62); East Setauket, New York, U.S.
- Listed height: 6 ft 2 in (1.88 m)
- Listed weight: 238 lb (108 kg)

Career information
- College: Colgate
- NFL draft: 1944: 18th round, 182nd overall pick

Career history
- Buffalo Bisons (1946); Los Angeles Dons (1947)

Career AAFC statistics
- Receptions: 2
- Receiving yards: 27
- Stats at Pro Football Reference

John Michael Batorski (September 27, 1920 – November 16, 1982) was an American football end in the All-America Football Conference (AAFC) for the Buffalo Bisons and Los Angeles Dons.

He played college football at Colgate University, and was drafted in the 18th round of the 1944 NFL draft by the Washington Redskins.
