= The Warwick =

Historic hotel in Philadelphia, Pennsylvania, United States

- U.S. National Register of Historic Places
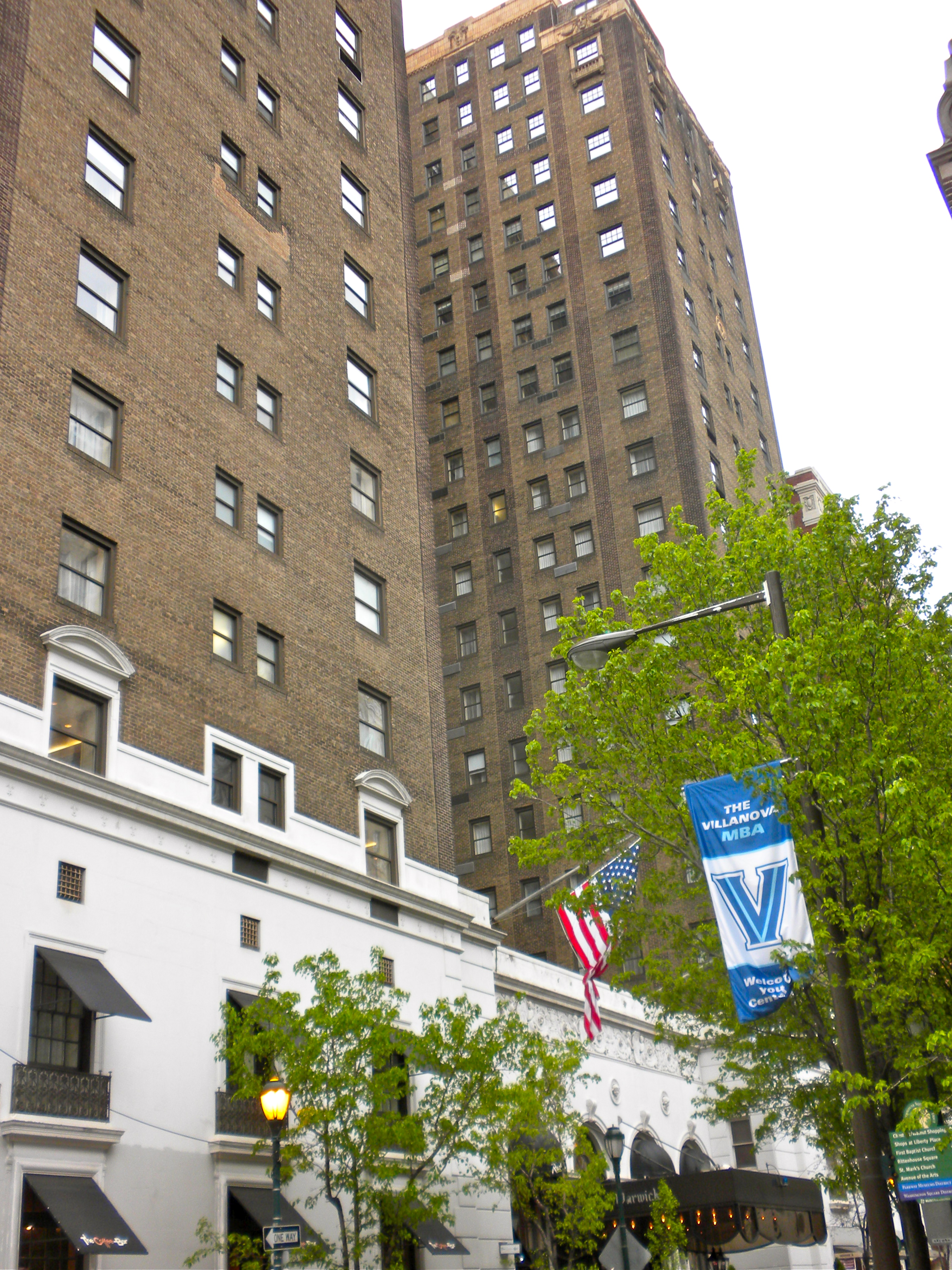
- The Warwick in April 2010

- Location within Philadelphia Location within Pennsylvania Location within the United States
- Location: 1701 Locust Street, Philadelphia, Pennsylvania, U.S.
- Coordinates: 39°56′56″N 75°10′12″W
- Area: 0.8 acres (0.32 ha)
- Built: 1925
- Architects: Baylinson & Hahn
- Architectural style: Late Victorian, Eclectic
- NRHP reference No.: 78002460
- Added to NRHP: August 10, 1978

The Warwick is a historic hotel located at 1701 Locust Street in the Rittenhouse Square neighborhood of Philadelphia, Pennsylvania.

Originally constructed in 1925 in an English Renaissance style, the building was listed on the National Register of Historic Places in 1978, and on the Philadelphia Register of Historic Places on February 8, 1995.

The hotel hosted the 1944 NFL draft, 1960 NFL draft, and 1961 NFL draft.

The building has been divided into condominiums and a hotel that operated as the Radisson Blu Warwick Hotel in the past, but is now an independent hotel, the Warwick Rittenhouse Square Philadelphia.

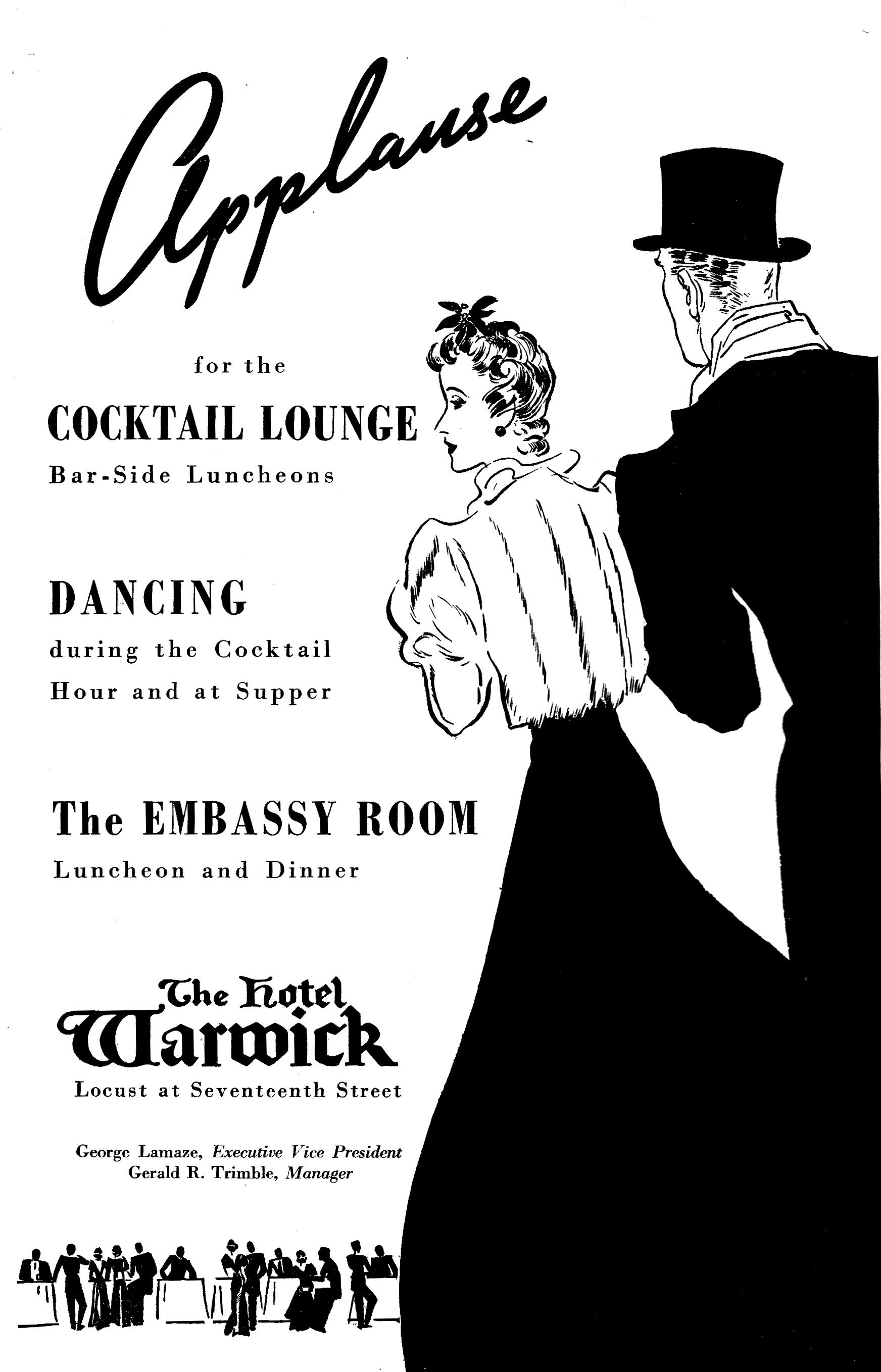
A 1938 display advertisement for The Warwick
