= Ray Kuffel =

American football player (1921–1974)

No. 55, 56
- Position: End

Personal information
- Born: December 9, 1921; Milwaukee, Wisconsin, U.S.
- Died: December 22, 1974 (aged 53); Milwaukee, Wisconsin, U.S.
- Listed height: 6 ft 3 in (1.91 m)
- Listed weight: 213 lb (97 kg)

Career information
- High school: Messmer (Milwaukee)
- College: Marquette (1940-1942, 1946); Notre Dame (1943)
- NFL draft: 1944: 20th round, 198th overall pick

Career history
- Buffalo Bills (1947); Chicago Rockets/Hornets (1948-1949)

Awards and highlights
- National champion (1943); McCahill Award (1947)

Career AAFC statistics
- Games played: 23
- Games started: 9
- Receptions: 22
- Receiving yards: 402
- Touchdowns: 3
- Stats at Pro Football Reference

Raymond Francis Kuffel (born December 9, 1921 – December 22, 1974) was an American football player in the All-America Football Conference (AAFC) for the Buffalo Bills and Chicago Rockets/Hornets from 1947 to 1949 as an end. He played at the collegiate level at Marquette University and the University of Notre Dame.
