= Lou Daukas =

American football player (1921–2005)

- Daukas, c. 1942

No. 24
- Position: Center

Personal information
- Born: July 4, 1921; Nashua, New Hampshire, U.S.
- Died: December 22, 2005 (aged 84); Glastonbury, Connecticut, U.S.
- Listed height: 6 ft 0 in (1.83 m)
- Listed weight: 203 lb (92 kg)

Career information
- High school: Nashua South (NH); Cushing (MA)
- College: Cornell
- NFL draft: 1947: undrafted

Career history

Playing
- Detroit Lions (1947)*; Brooklyn Dodgers (1947–1948)
- * Offseason or practice squad member only

Coaching
- Miami (1948) Assistant centers coach; Long Island Lions (1949) Head coach

Career AAFC statistics
- Games played: 4
- Interceptions: 1
- All-purpose yards: 2
- Stats at Pro Football Reference

Louis James Daukas (July 4, 1921 – December 22, 2005) was an American football player who was a center for one season in the All-America Football Conference (AAFC) for the Brooklyn Dodgers. He played college football for the Cornell Big Red and also had a stint with the Detroit Lions of the National Football League (NFL). He additionally was a coach and became an attorney after his football career.

== Early life and education ==
Daukas was born on July 4, 1921, in Nashua, New Hampshire. He first attended Nashua High School, playing football and baseball, being team captain in the former. He later attended Cushing Academy in Ashburnham, Massachusetts. After graduating from high school, Daukas enrolled at Cornell University, playing on the freshman football team in 1940 while serving as team captain. He saw his first varsity action in 1941, playing quarterback and center. The Ithaca Journal described him as being able to play "quarterback effectively". In the seventh game of the season, against Dartmouth, Daukas was lined up against his brother Nick, who played as a lineman for the opposing team.

Daukas earned his second football varsity letter in 1942. In week eight, he was matched up against his brother for the second time in his career. At the end of the season, Daukas was elected co-captain for the 1943 season. However, Meredith R. Cushing ended up serving as captain that year, as Daukas was called to serve in the United States Army for World War II. While in the army, he played and coached for the Fort Warren, Wyoming, football team, leading them to "one of the best records in the Rocky Mountains", according to the Nashua Telegraph. By the time Daukas was discharged in 1946, he had reached the rank of first lieutenant.

Daukas returned to the Cornell football team in 1946, for his senior season. At the end of the year, he was named honorable mention All-American by the Associated Press (AP). He was also selected to the Eastern College Football All-Star team, which played the New York Giants in an exhibition match. In addition to playing football, Daukas also played baseball at Cornell for two seasons, earning letters in 1942 and 1947.

== Professional career ==
Daukas was not selected in either the 1947 NFL draft or the 1947 AAFC Draft, but was given a contract as an undrafted free agent with the Detroit Lions in the NFL, although he did not make the final roster with them. Following the fourth game of the 1947 AAFC season, the Brooklyn Dodgers, attempting to "bolster their [injury-]riddled squad," signed Daukas on September 26. The move united him with his brother Nick, who was also a member of the Dodgers. In a game against the New York Yankees, Daukas recorded a one-yard interception return. He finished the season with four games played, one interception return for one yard, and one kickoff return for one yard, as the Dodgers ended the year with a record of 3–10–1.

Before the 1948 AAFC season, Daukas assisted in coaching the centers at the University of Miami. He was released by the Dodgers in August of that year, and finished his professional career with a total of four games played, one interception for one yard and one kick return for one yard. In 1949, Daukas served as the head coach of the newly-formed Long Island Lions.

== Later life and death ==
After his football career, Daukas earned a law degree from St. John's University School of Law and became an attorney. He served as the Vice President and Legal Counsel at Pratt & Whitney over a period of 30 years. He married Janet Buhsen in 1960 and had four children with her. Daukas died on December 22, 2005, at the age of 84, in Glastonbury, Connecticut.

Daukas was inducted into the Nashua High School Athletic Hall of Fame and the Cornell University Athletic Hall of Fame, the latter in 1994.
