= Steve Filipowicz =

American football & baseball player (1921–1975)

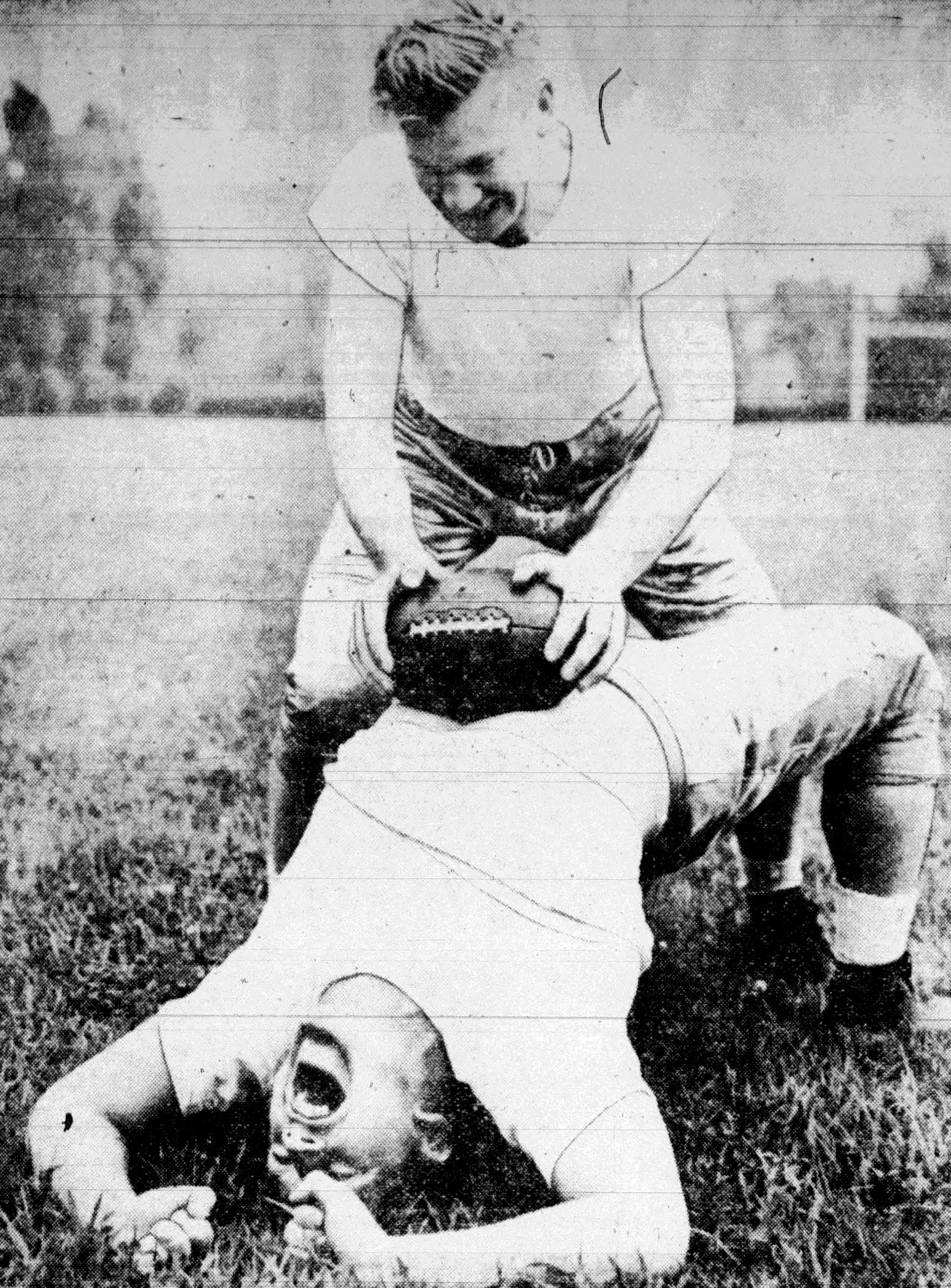
- Filipowicz (bottom) with Fordham teammate George Cheverko, circa 1942

No. 8, 23
- Position: Back

Personal information
- Born: June 28, 1921; Donora, Pennsylvania, U.S.
- Died: February 21, 1975 (aged 53); Wilkes-Barre, Pennsylvania, U.S.
- Listed height: 5 ft 8 in (1.73 m)
- Listed weight: 200 lb (91 kg)

Career information
- College: Fordham
- NFL draft: 1943: 1st round, 6th overall pick

Career history
- New York Giants (1945–1946)

Awards and highlights
- Second-team All-American (1941); First-team All-Eastern (1941); 2× Second-team All-Eastern (1940, 1942)

Career NFL statistics
- Rushing yards: 145
- Rushing average: 2.6
- Receptions: 11
- Receiving yards: 133
- Total touchdowns: 5
- Stats at Pro Football Reference

Other information
- Baseball career
- Outfielder
- Batted: Right Threw: Right

MLB debut
- September 3, 1944, for the New York Giants

Last MLB appearance
- October 3, 1948, for the Cincinnati Reds

MLB statistics
- Batting average: .223
- Home runs: 2
- RBI: 26
- Stats at Baseball Reference

Teams
- New York Giants (1944–1945); Cincinnati Reds (1948)

Stephen Charles "Flip" Filipowicz (June 28, 1921 – February 21, 1975) was an American professional football and baseball player. Filipowicz and Olympic great Jim Thorpe share the distinction of being the only two men to have played for the New York Giants of both baseball and football.

== Football ==
Filipowicz, a fullback and quarterback who played at Fordham University from 1941 to 1943, was selected by the New York Giants in the first round in the 1943 NFL draft. Although an undersized back at 5'8", 198 lbs, he was still taken with the sixth overall pick. In his first season, he rushed for 142 yards on 53 attempts and had 49 receiving yards. He also attempted two incomplete passes. In 1946 he made seven receptions for 84 yards and caught four interceptions as a blocking back. He retired after the season to become head football, basketball, and baseball coach at Mount Saint Mary's University. He resigned the following year to play baseball.

== Baseball ==
After a successful season as an outfielder and catcher for the Jersey City Giants, Filipowicz made his major league debut on September 3, 1944, for the New York Giants. He appeared in 15 games, collecting 8 hits in 41 at bats (.195). He appeared in 35 games the next season and batted .205 with 2 home runs. He made a return to baseball in 1948 with the Sunbury Reds of the Interstate League. He was called up to the Cincinnati Reds later that season and collected 9 hits in 26 at bats (.346). He spent the 1949 & 1950 seasons with the Syracuse Chiefs of the International League and the Tulsa Oilers of the Texas League.

== Later life ==
Filipowicz was in the United States Marines during World War II. He worked for the Pennsylvania Bureau of Revenue as a corporate tax officer for 17 years. Filipowicz died on February 21, 1975, in Wilkes-Barre, Pennsylvania and was buried in Kulpmont, Pennsylvania.
