= Jim Cox (guard) =

American football player (1920–2014)

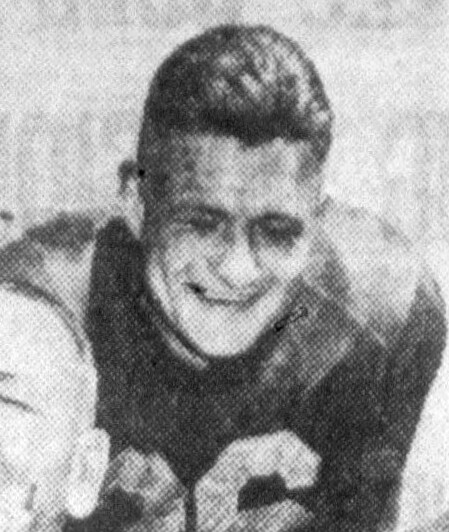
- Cox in 1943

No. 32
- Positions: Guard, linebacker

Personal information
- Born: September 6, 1920; St. Louis, Missouri, U.S.
- Died: July 29, 2014 (aged 93); Lafayette, California, U.S.
- Listed height: 6 ft 1 in (1.85 m)
- Listed weight: 208 lb (94 kg)

Career information
- High school: Christian Brothers (Sacramento, California)
- College: California; Stanford
- NFL draft: 1944: 21st round, 214th overall pick

Career history
- San Francisco 49ers (1948)

Career NFL statistics
- Games played: 14
- Stats at Pro Football Reference

James Ellingson Cox was an American professional football player who was a guard for the San Francisco 49ers of the All-America Football Conference (AAFC). He played college football for the California Golden Bears and Stanford Cardinal

After football, Cox worked as an attorney in Contra Costa County. In 1955, he investigated boxing and wrestling practices for the California State Athletic Commission, looking for ties to organized crime, and for a rumored conspiracy to monopolize matches.
