= Ollie Poole =

American football player (1922–2009)

No. 52, 54, 88
- Positions: End, defensive end

Personal information
- Born: April 18, 1922; Gloster, Mississippi, U.S.
- Died: June 27, 2009 (aged 87); Ruston, Louisiana, U.S.
- Listed height: 6 ft 3 in (1.91 m)
- Listed weight: 220 lb (100 kg)

Career information
- High school: Crosby (MS)
- College: North Carolina, Ole Miss
- NFL draft: 1944: 15th round, 147th overall pick

Career history
- New York Yankees (1947); Baltimore Colts (1948); Detroit Lions (1949)

Career NFL statistics
- Games: 22
- Stats at Pro Football Reference

Oliver Lamar Poole (April 18, 1922 – June 27, 2009) was an American professional football player who played at the end and defensive end positions.

== Biography ==
Ollie Poole was born in 1922 in Gloster, Mississippi, and attended Crosby High School. He attended the University of Mississippi and played college football there. During World War II, he joined the U.S. Marine Corps and was assigned to the V-12 Training Program at the University of North Carolina. He played in 1943 for the North Carolina Tar Heels football team, winning All-Southern Conference honors. In 1944, he played for the Camp Lejeune Marines football team.

He was selected by the New York Giants in the 15th round (147th overall pick) of the 1944 NFL draft but did not play for the Giants. He played professional football in the All-America Football Conference (AAFC) for the New York Yankees in 1947 and the Baltimore Colts in 1948 and in the National Football League (NFL) for the Detroit Lions in 1949. He appeared in a total of 14 AAFC and eight NFL games.

After his playing career ended, Poole was a teacher and high school and junior college football coach in Mississippi and Louisiana. He died in 2008 in Ruston, Louisiana, at age 87.
