= 1943 All-Southwest Conference football team =

American college football all-star team

The 1943 All-Southwest Conference football team consists of American football players chosen by various organizations for All-Southwest Conference teams for the 1943 college football season. The selectors for the 1943 season included the Associated Press (AP) and the United Press (UP).

== All Southwest selections ==
=== Backs ===
- Jim Callahan, Texas (AP-1)
- Jim Hallmark, Texas A&M (AP-1)
- Ralph Ellsworth, Texas (AP-1)
- Joe Magliolo, Texas (AP-1)
- Ralph Park, Texas (AP-2)
- Marion Flanagan, Texas A&M (AP-2)
- Jim Lucas, TCU (AP-2)
- Stanley Turner, Texas A&M (AP-2)

=== Ends ===
- Joe Parker, Texas (AP-1)
- Abe Croft, Southern Methodist (AP-1)
- Marion Settegast, Texas A&M (AP-2)
- Al Baldwin, Arkansas (AP-2)

=== Tackles ===
- Charles Malmberg, Rice (AP-1)
- Clyde Flowers, Texas Christian (AP-1)
- Marcel Gres, Texas (AP-2)
- James Young, Arkansas (AP-2)

=== Guards ===
- Leon Pense, Arkansas (AP-1)
- Goble Bryant, Texas A&M (AP-1)
- Franklin Butler, Texas (AP-2)
- Herb Turley, Texas A&M (AP-2)

=== Centers ===
- Billy Hale, Texas Christian (AP-1)
- Ed Cloud, SMU (AP-2)

== Key ==
AP = Associated Press

UP = United Press

Bold = Consensus first-team selection of both the AP and UP

== See also ==
- 1943 College Football All-America Team
