= Joe Yackanich =

American football player (1922–1969)

No. 32, 33
- Position: Guard

Personal information
- Born: March 31, 1922; Hazleton, Pennsylvania, U.S.
- Died: August 1, 1969 (aged 47); Lansing, Illinois, U.S.
- Listed height: 5 ft 10 in (1.78 m)
- Listed weight: 205 lb (93 kg)

Career information
- High school: Seton Hall (West Orange, New Jersey)
- College: Fordham (1941-1942)
- NFL draft: 1944: 20th round, 207th overall pick

Career history
- New York Yankees (1946–1948)

Career AAFC statistics
- Games played: 26
- Stats at Pro Football Reference

Joseph Yackanich (March 31, 1922 – August 1, 1969) was an American football guard who played in the All-America Football Conference (AAFC). He played college football at Fordham.

== College career ==
Yackanich was a starter for the Rams at guard in 1941 and at tackle in 1942. He started in the team's 1942 Sugar Bowl victory over Missouri. He left Fordham after his junior year to enlist in the US Army during WWII. Yackanich fought in the European Theater with the 63rd Infantry Division.

== Professional career ==
Yackanich was selected by the Cleveland Rams in the 20th round of the 1944 NFL draft while he was still in the Army. Yackanich left the Yankees during the 1948 season to finish his degree at Fordham. He played in 26 games over three seasons with the Yankees. After graduating he was hired by the Rams to coach the freshman football team and later became and offensive line coach for the Rams.

== Post-football ==
Yackanich left his coaching position in 1950 to become an FBI agent. He died on August 1, 1969.
