= Ralph Park =

American football player (1921–2003)

Ralph Park, Jr.
Profile
- Position: Back

Personal information
- Born: 1921
- Died: January 24, 2003 (aged 81–82)

Career information
- High school: Austin High School
- College: Texas

Awards and highlights
- Second-team All-SWC (1943)

Ralph Park Jr. (1921 – January 24, 2003) was an American football player.

== Early life ==
Park attended Austin High and lettered in all sports there.

== College football career ==
Park went to college at the University of Texas, where he played football for the Texas Longhorns from 1939 to 1943, lettering in 1940, 1942 and 1943.

After getting dropped from the team due to knee surgery in 1941, he returned in 1942 still prone to charley horses, which led to the nickname "Pulled Muscle Park".

Park was the team captain of Dana X. Bible's 1943 Texas Longhorns football team that won the Southwest Conference Championship and tied in the 1944 Cotton Bowl Classic. That season he scored one of the two touchdowns in the win over Oklahoma, was named one of the team's Outstanding Players for the Arkansas game, led the Southwest Conference in scoring (8TDs and 11PATs), was an Honorable Mention All-American and made the Austin Statesman and AP's 2nd Team All-Conference team. During his time at Texas he was also in the Marines and nearly missed the Cotton Bowl as a result. He also helped with a conference championship in 1942.

== Professional football career ==
He was drafted by the NFL's Brooklyn Tigers in the third round of the 1944 NFL draft, 18th overall but never played.

== Personal life ==
In August 1941, while playing football at Texas, Park confirmed to the Austin American-Statesman that he was married. He met his wife, Dorothy Nell (“Pony”) Pulliam, when she was working in the legislature. They stayed in Austin, where she continued to work in the legislature, until 1963.

With his brother, he owned and operated the Bavarian Steakhouse in Dallas until 1981. They then moved to Briggs, Texas, and he entered the oil and gas industry.

After his 2003 death, he was buried at the family cemetery in Briggs, TX.
