= Daukaus =

Daukaus is a surname. Notable people with the surname include:

- Chris Daukaus (born 1989), American mixed martial arts fighter
- Kyle Daukaus (born 1993), American mixed martial arts fighter

== See also ==
- Daukas
