= Alex Kapter =

American football player (1922–2005)

- Kapter in 1946

No. 39
- Position: Guard

Personal information
- Born: March 26, 1922; Waukegan, Illinois, U.S.
- Died: July 25, 2005 (aged 83); Thousand Oaks, California, U.S.
- Listed height: 6 ft 0 in (1.83 m)
- Listed weight: 205 lb (93 kg)

Career information
- High school: Waukegan
- College: Northwestern
- NFL draft: 1944: 21st round, 211th overall pick

Career history
- Cleveland Browns (1946)

Awards and highlights
- AAFC champion (1946); Second-team All-Big Ten (1943)

Career NFL statistics
- Games played: 6
- Stats at Pro Football Reference

Alexander Joe Kapter (March 26, 1922 – July 26, 2005) was an American professional football player who was a guard for one season with the Cleveland Browns of the All-America Football Conference (AAFC). Kapter played college football for the Northwestern Wildcats and joined the Browns after a stint in the U.S. Navy during World War II. Cleveland won the AAFC championship in 1946, his only season as a professional football player.

== College career ==
Kapter attended Northwestern University, where he played for the Wildcats. He started play as a sophomore year in 1941, but only became the team's regular left guard in 1942. Kapter entered the U.S. Navy in 1943, but was allowed to stay at Northwestern along with the football team's quarterback, Otto Graham, to finish the season. Kapter played in the College All-Star Game in 1943 and was named to the team again in 1944. The Navy barred him from participating in the 1944 game, however, because of a rule that disallowed any activity that would require an absence of 48 hours or more.

== Professional career ==
Kapter was selected in the 21st round of the 1944 NFL draft by the Detroit Lions, but military service delayed his entry into the professional ranks. He signed in 1946 to play for the Cleveland Browns, a team under formation in the new All-America Football Conference. Otto Graham, Kapter's teammate at Northwestern, also signed with the Browns. During the 1946 season, Kapter alternated on occasion with Bill Willis at right guard when Willis came down with strep throat. The Browns won the AAFC championship that year.
