= John Durko =

American football player (1914–1963)

No. 88 (Eagles), 45 (Cardinals)
- Positions: End, tackle

Personal information
- Born: July 23, 1914; Mahanoy City, Pennsylvania
- Died: January 1, 1963 (aged 48); Orwigsburg, Pennsylvania
- Listed height: 6 ft 4 in (1.93 m)
- Listed weight: 235 lb (107 kg)

Career information
- High school: Mahanoy City (PA)
- College: Albright

Career history
- Philadelphia Eagles (1944); Chicago Cardinals (1945); Bethlehem Bulldogs (1946–1948)
- Stats at Pro Football Reference

John Joseph Durko (July 23, 1914 – January 1, 1963) was an American football end and tackle.

Durko was born in 1914 in Mahanoy City, Pennsylvania, and graduated from Mahonoy City High School. After high school, he worked in the local coal mines for several years. He received an athletic scholarship to Albright College where he completed in football, basketball, and track. He was captain of the basketball team and set records in the shot put and discus. He played for Albright's football team in 1942 and 1943.

Durko played professional football in the National Football League (NFL) for the Philadelphia Eagles (NFL) in 1942 and the Chicago Cardinals in 1943. He appeared in seven NFL games. He also played for the Bethlehem Bulldogs of the American Football League from 1946 to 1948.

After his football career ended, Durko worked in sales for Curtis Industries in Cleveland. He also officiated football games. He died in 1963 at age 48 in Orwigsburg, Pennsylvania.
