= Jack Carpenter (gridiron football) =

American gridiron football player (1923–2005)

- Carpenter, 1946

No. 45, 38, 40, 44, 60
- Position: Tackle

Personal information
- Born: July 29, 1923; Kansas City, Missouri, U.S.
- Died: October 16, 2005 (aged 82); Honolulu, Hawaii, U.S.
- Listed height: 6 ft 0 in (1.83 m)
- Listed weight: 240 lb (109 kg)

Career information
- High school: Northeast (Kansas City)
- College: Columbia (1940); Missouri (1941–1942); Michigan (1946)
- NFL draft: 1944: 15th round, 143rd overall pick

Career history

Playing
- Buffalo Bills (1947–1949); San Francisco 49ers (1949); Hamilton Tiger-Cats (1950–1951); Toronto Argonauts (1952–1954)

Coaching
- Toronto Argonauts (1954) Assistant line coach

Awards and highlights
- Grey Cup champion (1952); First-team All-Big Nine (1946)

Career AAFC statistics
- Games played: 36
- Games started: 14
- Stats at Pro Football Reference

Jack C. Carpenter (July 29, 1923 – October 16, 2005) was an American professional football player. He played at the tackle position for the University of Michigan in 1946. He played professional football for the Buffalo Bills of the All-America Football Conference (AAFC) from 1947 to 1949 and for the San Francisco 49ers of the AAFC in 1949. He also played five years in the Canadian Football League (CFL) for the Hamilton Tiger-Cats (1950–1951) and Toronto Argonauts (1952–1954).

== College football ==
A native of Kansas City, Missouri, Carpenter began his college football career at the University of Missouri. He played football for the Missouri Tigers in 1942.

He also played for the United States Marine Corps.

Carpenter enrolled at the University of Michigan in 1946 and won the starting right tackle position on Fritz Crisler's 1946 Michigan Wolverines football team that finished the season with a record of 6–2–1, ranked No. 6 in the final AP poll. At the end of the 1946 season, Carpenter was selected as an All-Big Nine Conference player by the United Press. Carpenter, Alex Agase and Earl Banks received the most votes among the lineman. The United Press noted at the time: "Carpenter was stamped by numerous scouts as the ideal tackle."

== Professional football ==
In January 1947, Carpenter announced that he intended to withdraw from school at the end of the semester to play professional football.

Carpenter had been drafted by the Chicago Cardinals in the 1944 NFL draft, but he opted instead to play in the new All-America Football Conference. He initially signed with the New York Yankees, but was traded to the Cleveland Browns and then in late August 1947 to the Buffalo Bills.

Carpenter played for the Bills from 1947 to 1949. He was traded to the San Francisco 49ers during the 1949 AAFC season and finished the season there.

The AAFC folded after the 1949 season, and Carpenter signed to play for the Hamilton Tiger-Cats of the Canadian Football League in 1950. His signing led one Canadian sports columnist to write: "The advance notices indicate that local football fans will see a real lineman when Jack Carpenter shows here with the Tiger-Cats on Saturday." He played for the Tiger-Cats in 1950 and 1951.

Carpenter played for the Toronto Argonauts from 1952 to 1954. During the 1954, he also served as the Argonauts' line coach and was singled out by head coach Frank Clair as "the pillar of strength on the Argos' front wall."

== Later life ==
After retiring from football, Carpenter opened Jack Carpenter's Hotel, a popular restaurant, bar and bowling alley in South Wales, New York. He was a resident of Honolulu, Hawaii in his later years. After a long illness, he died in 2005 at age 82 in a Honolulu nursing home.
