= Earle Parsons =

American football player (1921–2014)

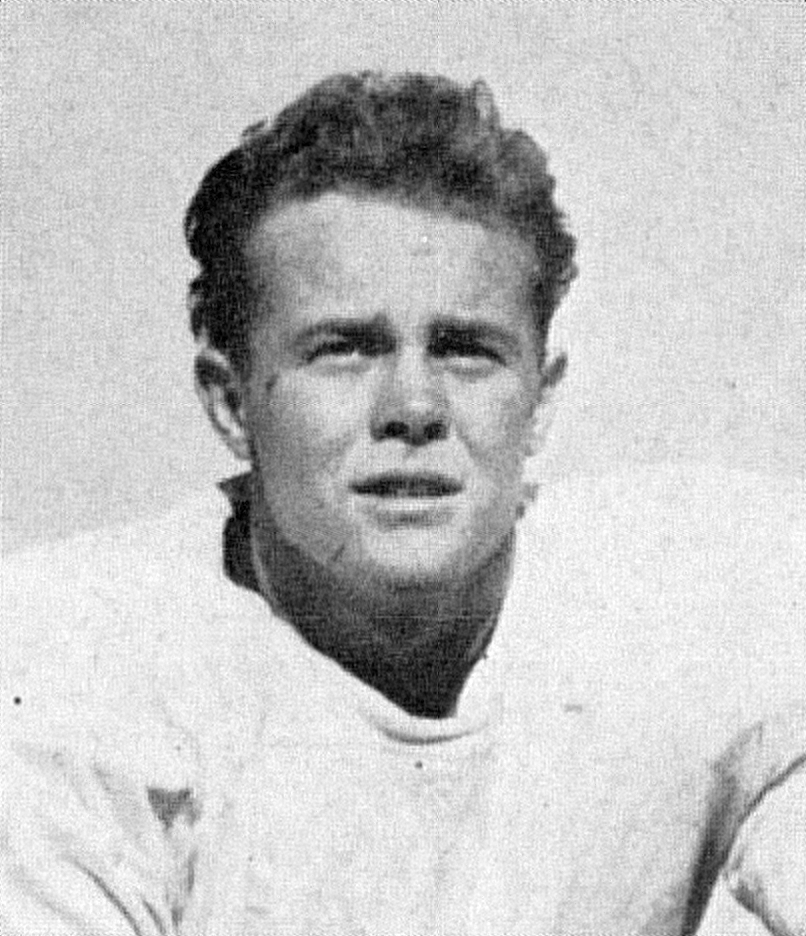
- Parsons pictured in El Rodeo 1944, USC yearbook

No. 20, 94, 84
- Position: Halfback

Personal information
- Born: September 16, 1921; Helena, Montana, U.S.
- Died: December 18, 2014 (aged 93)
- Listed height: 6 ft 0 in (1.83 m)
- Listed weight: 180 lb (82 kg)

Career information
- High school: Helena
- College: USC (1942-1943)
- NFL draft: 1944: 12th round, 118th overall pick

Career history
- Los Angeles Bulldogs (1945); San Francisco 49ers (1946-1947)

Career AAFC statistics
- Rushing yards: 487
- Rushing average: 4.6
- Receptions: 17
- Receiving yards: 215
- Total touchdowns: 4
- Stats at Pro Football Reference

Earle Odber Parsons Jr. (September 16, 1921 – December 18, 2014) was an American professional football halfback who played two seasons with the San Francisco 49ers. He played college football at the University of Southern California, having previously attended high school in his hometown of Helena, Montana. He is a member of the Helena Sports Hall of Fame.

Parsons died on December 18, 2014, at the age of 93.
