= 1944 NFL draft =

National Football League draft

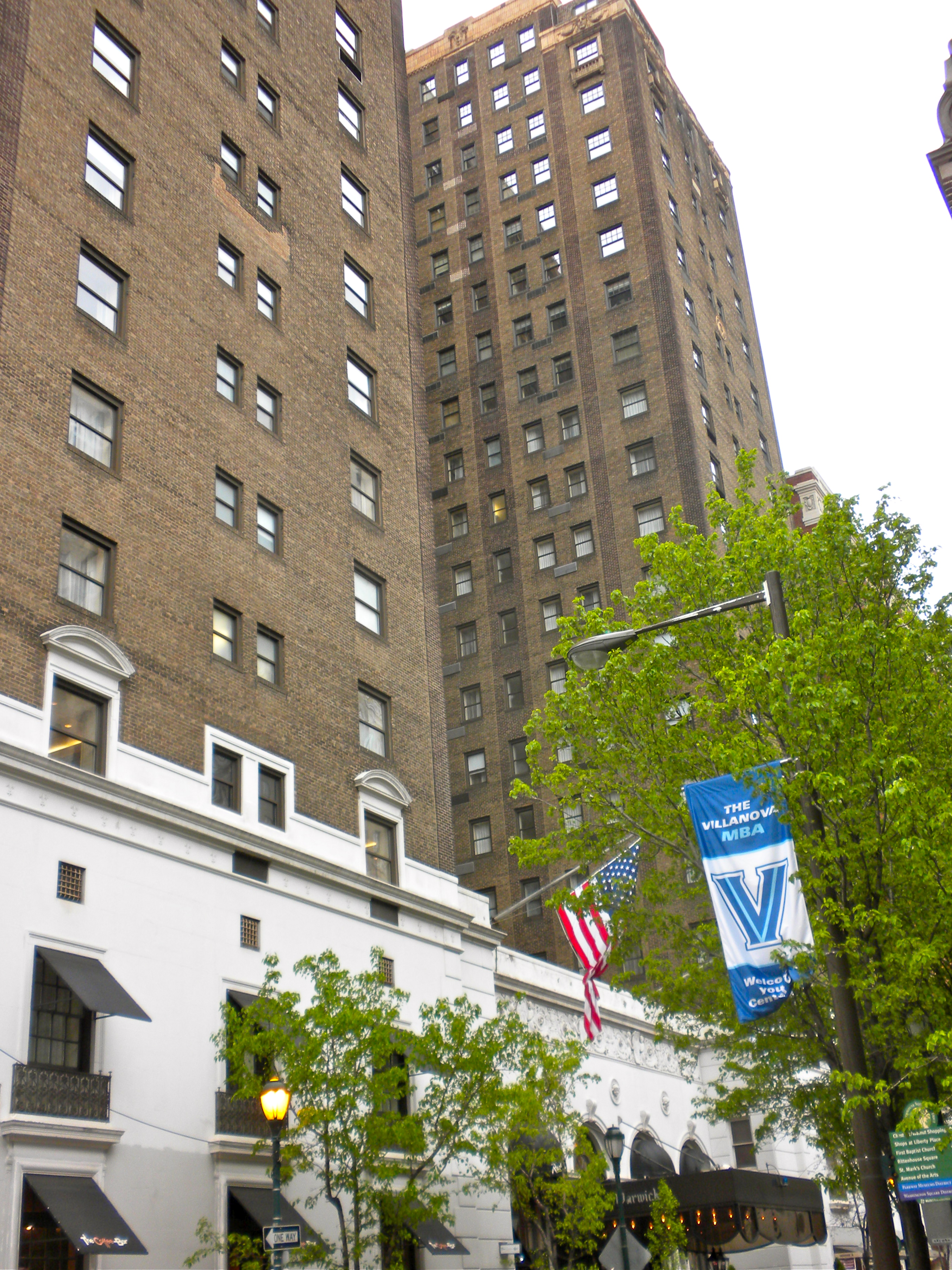
- Warwick Hotel (location of the draft), photographed in 2010

General information
- Date: April 19, 1944
- Location: Warwick Hotel in Philadelphia, Pennsylvania

Overview
- 330 total selections in 32 rounds
- League: NFL
- First selection: Angelo Bertelli, QB; Boston Yanks
- Most selections (30): each team made 30 picks
- Fewest selections (30): each team made 30 picks
- Hall of Famers: 4: QB Otto Graham; RB Steve Van Buren; QB Bob Waterfield; DE Ed Sprinkle

The 1944 NFL draft was held on April 19, 1944, at the Warwick Hotel in Philadelphia, Pennsylvania. Perhaps as a tip of the hat to wartime sensibilities, the 1944 draft was officially called the "1943 Preferred Negotiations List" by the league.

With the first overall pick of the draft, the Boston Yanks selected quarterback Angelo Bertelli.

Although there were 32 rounds in the 1944 draft, each of the league's 11 teams selected 30 players, for a total of 330 players picked. The five worst-finishing teams picked alone in rounds 2 and 4, while the five best-finishing teams plus the expansion Yanks picked alone in rounds 31 and 32.

By agreement of league owners, the new Yanks franchise received the first pick of the first round and then dropped to 11th in the order of draft selection, making their next choice at 27. As a mechanism for reestablishing the Philadelphia Eagles and Pittsburgh Steelers as individual entities after their wartime merger-of-convenience as the so-called Phil-Pitt Steagles in 1943, these teams selected fourth and ninth alternately in the 1943 draft. This gave Pittsburgh picks 10, 15, 31, and 41 at the top of the draft and Philadelphia picks 5, 20, and 36.

== Player selections ==
	= Hall of Famer
†	= Pro Bowler (Note: Players are identified as a Pro Bowler if they were selected for the Pro Bowl at any time in their career.)

=== Round 1 ===
Pick #	NFL team	Player	Position	College
1	Boston Yanks	Angelo Bertelli	Quarterback	Notre Dame
2	Chicago Cardinals	Pat Harder	Fullback	Wisconsin
3	Brooklyn Tigers	Creighton Miller	Halfback	Notre Dame
4	Detroit Lions	Otto Graham	Back	Northwestern
5	Philadelphia Eagles	Steve Van Buren	Halfback	LSU
6	New York Giants	Billy Hillenbrand	Halfback	Indiana
7	Green Bay Packers	Merv Pregulman	Guard	Michigan
8	Washington Redskins	Mike Micka	Back	Colgate
9	Chicago Bears	Ray Evans	Halfback	Kansas
10	Pittsburgh Steelers	Johnny Podesto	Tailback	St. Mary's (CA)
11	Cleveland Rams	Tony Butkovich	Fullback	Purdue

=== Round 2 ===
Pick #	NFL team	Player	Position	College
12	Chicago Cardinals	Paul Mitchell	Tackle	Minnesota
13	Brooklyn Tigers	Jim Callahan	Back	Texas
14	Detroit Lions	Bob Cifers	Back	Tennessee
15	Pittsburgh Steelers	Bob Odell	End	Penn
16	New York Giants	Lamar Blount	Back	Mississippi State

=== Round 3 ===
Pick #	NFL team	Player	Position	College
17	Chicago Cardinals	Saxon Judd	End	Tulsa
18	Brooklyn Tigers	Ralph Park	Back	Texas
19	Detroit Lions	Ralph Heywood	End	USC
20	Philadelphia Eagles	Loren LaPrade	Guard	Stanford
21	New York Giants	Clyde Flowers	Tackle	TCU
22	Green Bay Packers	Tom Kuzma	Back	Michigan
23	Washington Redskins	Earl Audet	Tackle	USC
24	Chicago Bears	Rudy Smeja	End	Michigan
25	Pittsburgh Steelers	Bob Gantt	End	Duke
26	Cleveland Rams	Gil Bouley	Tackle	Boston College
27	Boston Yanks	Babe Dimancheff	Back	Purdue

=== Round 4 ===
Pick #	NFL team	Player	Position	College
28	Chicago Cardinals	Jack Tavener	Center	Indiana
29	Brooklyn Tigers	Rudy Sikich	Tackle	Minnesota
30	Detroit Lions	George Betteridge	Back	Utah
31	Pittsburgh Steelers	Art McCaffray	Tackle	Pacific
32	New York Giants	Herb Kane	Tackle	East Central (OK)

=== Round 5 ===
Pick #	NFL team	Player	Position	College
33	Chicago Cardinals	Bill Blackburn	Center	Rice
34	Brooklyn Tigers	Verne Ullom	End	Cincinnati
35	Detroit Lions	John Greene	Tackle	Michigan
36	Philadelphia Eagles	Joe Parker	End	Texas
37	New York Giants	Vic Maitland	Tackle	Hobart
38	Green Bay Packers	Bill McPartland	Tackle	St. Mary's (CA)
39	Washington Redskins	Ed Doherty	Quarterback	Boston College
40	Chicago Bears	Abe Croft	End	SMU
41	Pittsburgh Steelers	George Owen	Guard	Wake Forest
42	Cleveland Rams	Bob Waterfield	Quarterback	UCLA
43	Boston Yanks	Larry Rice	Center	Tulane

=== Round 6 ===
Pick #	NFL team	Player	Position	College
44	Chicago Cardinals	Bill Garnaas	Back	Minnesota
45	Brooklyn Tigers	Bruce McDonald	End	Illinois State
46	Detroit Lions	Ed Alliquie	Tackle	Santa Clara
47	Pittsburgh Steelers	Dan Savage	Back	Brown
48	New York Giants	Jack Okland	Tackle	Utah State
49	Green Bay Packers	Mickey McCardle	Back	USC
50	Washington Redskins	Jackie Fellows	Back	Fresno State
51	Chicago Bears	C. B. Stanley	Tackle	Tulsa
52	Philadelphia Eagles	Hillary Horne	Tackle	Mississippi State
53	Cleveland Rams	Al Akins	Back	Washington
54	Boston Yanks	Butch Parker	Tackle	Loyola (CA)

=== Round 7 ===
Pick #	NFL team	Player	Position	College
55	Chicago Cardinals	Rodger Smith	Back	Texas Tech
56	Brooklyn Tigers	Bob Graiziger	Guard	Minnesota
57	Detroit Lions	Paul Briggs	Tackle	Colorado
58	Philadelphia Eagles	Vic Kulbitski	Back	Minnesota
59	New York Giants	Herm Frickey	Back	Minnesota
60	Green Bay Packers	Jack Tracy	End	Washington
61	Washington Redskins	Hal Fischer	Guard	Texas
62	Chicago Bears	Darwin Seeley	Center	Stanford
63	Pittsburgh Steelers	Jesse Freitas	Back	Santa Clara
64	Cleveland Rams	George Cheverko	Back	Fordham
65	Boston Yanks	Mike Andrews	End	NC State

=== Round 8 ===
Pick #	NFL team	Player	Position	College
66	Chicago Cardinals	Red Cochran	Back	Wake Forest
67	Brooklyn Tigers	Jack Sachse	Center	Texas
68	Detroit Lions	Rod Giske	Guard	Washington State
69	Pittsburgh Steelers	George Titus	Center	Holy Cross
70	New York Giants	Roy Clay	Back	Colorado A&M
71	Green Bay Packers	Alex Agase	Guard	Illinois
72	Washington Redskins	Cliff White	Tackle	Murray State
73	Chicago Bears	Buck Fawcett	Back	Stanford
74	Philadelphia Eagles	George Phillips	Back	UCLA
75	Cleveland Rams	Stan Stasica	Back	South Carolina
76	Boston Yanks	Bob Musick	Back	USC

=== Round 9 ===
Pick #	NFL team	Player	Position	College
77	Chicago Cardinals	Frank Scanlan	Back	Loyola (CA)
78	Brooklyn Tigers	Mitchell Olenski	Tackle	Alabama
79	Detroit Lions	Matthew Bolger	End	Notre Dame
80	Philadelphia Eagles	Paul Sarringhaus	Back	Ohio State
81	New York Giants	John Sanchez	Tackle	San Francisco
82	Green Bay Packers	Don Whitmire	Tackle	Navy
83	Washington Redskins	Ted Ogdahl	Back	Willamette
84	Chicago Bears	Jack Morton	End	Missouri
85	Pittsburgh Steelers	Ed Stofko	Back	St. Francis (PA)
86	Cleveland Rams	Fred Boensch	Tackle	Stanford
87	Boston Yanks	Tex Warrington	Center	Auburn

=== Round 10 ===
Pick #	NFL team	Player	Position	College
88	Chicago Cardinals	Lou Saban	Back	Indiana
89	Brooklyn Tigers	Aldo Cenci	Back	Penn State
90	Detroit Lions	Herb Hein	End	Minnesota
91	Pittsburgh Steelers	Val Jansante	End	Duquesne
92	New York Giants	Ernie Beamer	End	Duke
93	Green Bay Packers	Bob Koch	Back	Oregon
94	Washington Redskins	Bob Sneddon	Back	St. Mary's (CA)
95	Chicago Bears	Bill Starford	Center	Wake Forest
96	Philadelphia Eagles	John Perko	Guard	Minnesota
97	Cleveland Rams	Bob Shaw	End	Ohio State
98	Boston Yanks	Angelo Sisti	Tackle	Boston College

=== Round 11 ===
Pick #	NFL team	Player	Position	College
99	Chicago Cardinals	Fran Griffin	Tackle	Holy Cross
100	Brooklyn Tigers	John Bicaninch	Guard	Minnesota
101	Detroit Lions	Paul White	Back	Michigan
102	Philadelphia Eagles	Elliott Ormsbee	Back	Bradley
103	New York Giants	Carl Grate	Guard	Georgia
104	Green Bay Packers	Virgil Johnson	End	Arkansas
105	Washington Redskins	Bill Aldworth	Tackle	Minnesota
106	Chicago Bears	Lin Houston	Guard	Ohio State
107	Pittsburgh Steelers	Carl Buda	Guard	Tulsa
108	Cleveland Rams	Joe Andrejco	Back	Fordham
109	Boston Yanks	Gene Long	Guard	Kansas

=== Round 12 ===
Pick #	NFL team	Player	Position	College
110	Chicago Cardinals	Leo Daniels	Back	Texas A&M
111	Brooklyn Tigers	Jim Tyree	End	Oklahoma
112	Detroit Lions	Jack Lescoulie	Guard	UCLA
113	Pittsburgh Steelers	Sam Gray	End	Tulsa
114	New York Giants	Tommy Mont	Back	Maryland
115	Green Bay Packers	Roy Giusti	Back	St. Mary's (CA)
116	Washington Redskins	Bill Joslyn	Back	Stanford
117	Chicago Bears	J. P. Moore	Back	Vanderbilt
118	Philadelphia Eagles	Earle Parsons	Back	USC
119	Cleveland Rams	Pat Filley	Guard	Notre Dame
120	Boston Yanks	Ed Fiorentino	End	Boston College

=== Round 13 ===
Pick #	NFL team	Player	Position	College
121	Chicago Cardinals	Bobby Dobbs	Back	Tulsa
122	Brooklyn Tigers	Jim Wright	Center	SMU
123	Detroit Lions	Doug Rehor	Back	Dickinson
124	Philadelphia Eagles	Bob Hanzlik	End	Wisconsin
125	New York Giants	Ray Poole	End	Ole Miss
126	Green Bay Packers	Bill Baughman	Center	Alabama
127	Washington Redskins	Charley Walker	Center	Kentucky
128	Chicago Bears	Bill Duffey	End	Georgetown
129	Pittsburgh Steelers	Bob Longacre	Back	William & Mary
130	Cleveland Rams	Bob Erickson	Back	Washington
131	Boston Yanks	Mike Zeleznak	Back	Kansas State

=== Round 14 ===
Pick #	NFL team	Player	Position	College
132	Chicago Cardinals	Van Hall	Back	TCU
133	Brooklyn Tigers	John Genis	Tackle	Illinois
134	Detroit Lions	Bill Pritula	Center	Michigan
135	Pittsburgh Steelers	Les Zetty	End	Muhlenberg
136	New York Giants	Bert Corley	Center	Mississippi State
137	Green Bay Packers	Don Griffin	Back	Illinois
138	Washington Redskins	Boyd Clement	Center	Oregon State
139	Chicago Bears	Joe Hartley	Tackle	LSU
140	Philadelphia Eagles	Jim Talley	Center	LSU
141	Cleveland Rams	Mel Maceau	Center	Marquette
142	Boston Yanks	John Maskas	Tackle	VPI

=== Round 15 ===
Pick #	NFL team	Player	Position	College
143	Chicago Cardinals	Jack Carpenter	Tackle	Missouri
144	Brooklyn Tigers	Spook Murphy	Back	Mississippi State
145	Detroit Lions	Jim Molich	End	Fresno State
146	Philadelphia Eagles	Dom Fusci	Tackle	South Carolina
147	New York Giants	Ollie Poole	End	Ole Miss
148	Green Bay Packers	Bert Gissler	End	Nebraska
149	Washington Redskins	Jim Gaffney	Back	Tennessee
150	Chicago Bears	Bill Milner	Guard	Duke
151	Pittsburgh Steelers	Jim Myers	Guard	Tennessee
152	Cleveland Rams	Bud Hubbell	End	Tennessee
153	Boston Yanks	John Bond	Back	TCU

=== Round 16 ===
Pick #	NFL team	Player	Position	College
154	Chicago Cardinals	Charley Csuri	Tackle	Ohio State
155	Brooklyn Tigers	Doug Essick	End	USC
156	Detroit Lions	Jules Yakapovich	Back	Colgate
157	Pittsburgh Steelers	Joe Gottlieb	Back	Duquesne
158	New York Giants	Ralph Ellsworth	Back	Texas
159	Green Bay Packers	Lou Shelton	Back	Oregon State
160	Washington Redskins	Ted Ossowski	Tackle	Oregon State
161	Chicago Bears	Buckets Hirsch	Back	Northwestern
162	Philadelphia Eagles	Johnny Green	End	Tulsa
163	Cleveland Rams	John Aguirre	Tackle	USC
164	Boston Yanks	Roger Antaya	Guard	Dartmouth

=== Round 17 ===
Pick #	NFL team	Player	Position	College
165	Chicago Cardinals	Joe Magliolo	Back	Texas
166	Brooklyn Tigers	Red Maley	Back	SMU
167	Detroit Lions	Jack Helms	Tackle	Georgia Tech
168	Philadelphia Eagles	Jackie Freeman	Back	William & Mary
169	New York Giants	Ed Schneider	Tackle	Washburn
170	Green Bay Packers	Charley Cusick	Guard	Colgate
171	Washington Redskins	Tom Davis	Back	Duke
172	Chicago Bears	Ed Ryckeley	End	Georgia Tech
173	Pittsburgh Steelers	Hugh Davis	Back	Michigan State
174	Cleveland Rams	Aubrey Clayton	Back	Auburn
175	Boston Yanks	Marshall Shurnas	End	Missouri

=== Round 18 ===
Pick #	NFL team	Player	Position	College
176	Chicago Cardinals	Walt Szot	Tackle	Bucknell
177	Brooklyn Tigers	Don Willer	Tackle	USC
178	Detroit Lions	Elmer Madarik	Back	Detroit
179	Pittsburgh Steelers	Bill Sullivan	End	Villanova
180	New York Giants	Marcel Gres	Tackle	Texas
181	Green Bay Packers	Hugh Cox	Back	North Carolina
182	Washington Redskins	John Batorski	End	Colgate
183	Chicago Bears	Howdy Plasman	Back	Miami (FL)
184	Philadelphia Eagles	Joe Kane	Back	Penn
185	Cleveland Rams	Ziggy Zamlynski	Back	Villanova
186	Boston Yanks	Reldon Bennett	Tackle	LSU

=== Round 19 ===
Pick #	NFL team	Player	Position	College
187	Chicago Cardinals	Jack Adams	End	Presbyterian
188	Brooklyn Tigers	Howard Callanan	Back	USC
189	Detroit Lions	Bill Eubank	End	Mississippi State
190	Philadelphia Eagles	Tony Schiro	Guard	Santa Clara
191	New York Giants	Neil Brooks	Back	Washington
192	Green Bay Packers	Kermit Davis	End	Mississippi State
193	Washington Redskins	Clyde Ehrhardt	Center	Georgia
194	Chicago Bears	Bear French	Tackle	Purdue
195	Pittsburgh Steelers	Jimmy Woodside	Center	Temple
196	Cleveland Rams	Bob McBride	Guard	Notre Dame
197	Boston Yanks	Art Faircloth	Back	NC State

=== Round 20 ===
Pick #	NFL team	Player	Position	College
198	Chicago Cardinals	Ray Kuffel	End	Marquette
199	Brooklyn Tigers	George Doherty	Tackle	Louisiana Tech
200	Detroit Lions	Ray Ahlstrom	Back	St. Mary's (CA)
201	Pittsburgh Steelers	Bill Miller	Back	Penn
202	New York Giants	Pete Kane	Back	Geneva
203	Green Bay Packers	Bob Johnson	Center	Purdue
204	Washington Redskins	Dave Brown	End	UCLA
205	Chicago Bears	Paul Taylor	Back	USC
206	Philadelphia Eagles	Norm Michael	Back	Syracuse
207	Cleveland Rams	Joe Yackanich	Tackle	Fordham
208	Boston Yanks	Tony Bilotti	Guard	St. Mary's (CA)

=== Round 21 ===
Pick #	NFL team	Player	Position	College
209	Chicago Cardinals	Jack West	End	Texas
210	Brooklyn Tigers	Mike Mihalic	Guard	Mississippi State
211	Detroit Lions	Alex Kapter	Guard	Northwestern
212	Philadelphia Eagles	Eddie Kulakowski	Tackle	West Virginia
213	New York Giants	Kit Kittrell	Back	Baylor
214	Green Bay Packers	Jim Cox	Tackle	Stanford
215	Washington Redskins	Bill Ivy	Tackle	Northwestern
216	Chicago Bears	Hank Margarita	Back	Brown
217	Pittsburgh Steelers	Bob Lawson	End	Holy Cross
218	Cleveland Rams	John Creevey	Back	Notre Dame
219	Boston Yanks	Bill Furman	Tackle	Washington & Lee

=== Round 22 ===
Pick #	NFL team	Player	Position	College
220	Chicago Cardinals	Jack Esorcia	Back	Illinois State
221	Brooklyn Tigers	Ted Cook	End	Alabama
222	Detroit Lions	Vick Clark	Back	Texas Western
223	Pittsburgh Steelers	Hank Caver	Back	Presbyterian
224	New York Giants	Roy Renfro	Guard	Fresno State
225	Green Bay Packers	Cliff Anderson	End	Minnesota
226	Washington Redskins	Bruce Babcock	Back	Rochester
227	Chicago Bears	Ed Davis	Back	Oklahoma
228	Philadelphia Eagles	Al Postus	Back	Villanova
229	Cleveland Rams	David Paul Jones	Back	Arkansas
230	Boston Yanks	Clare Morford	Guard	Oklahoma

=== Round 23 ===
Pick #	NFL team	Player	Position	College
231	Chicago Cardinals	Don Buffmire	Back	Northwestern
232	Brooklyn Tigers	Bucky Gillenwater	Tackle	Texas
233	Detroit Lions	Max Fischer	Center	Oklahoma
234	Philadelphia Eagles	Milt Smith	End	UCLA
235	New York Giants	John Dubzinski	Guard	Boston College
236	Green Bay Packers	John Wesley Perry	Back	Duke
237	Washington Redskins	Bill Reinhard	Back	California
238	Chicago Bears	Dick Jamison	Tackle	USC
239	Pittsburgh Steelers	Paul Carter	Tackle	Michigan State
240	Cleveland Rams	Jim Pharr	Center	Auburn
241	Boston Yanks	Dilton Richmond	End	LSU

=== Round 24 ===
Pick #	NFL team	Player	Position	College
242	Chicago Cardinals	Bob Nanni	Tackle	Duke
243	Brooklyn Tigers	Jack Baldwin	Center	Centenary
244	Detroit Lions	Chuck Jacoby	Back	Indiana
245	Pittsburgh Steelers	Dick Holben	Tackle	Muhlenberg
246	New York Giants	Howard Beyer	Center	Michigan State
247	Green Bay Packers	Pete DeMaria	Guard	Purdue
248	Washington Redskins	Ed Bauer	Guard	South Carolina
249	Chicago Bears	Jack Bortka	Back	Kansas State
250	Philadelphia Eagles	Earl Klapstein	Tackle	Pacific
251	Cleveland Rams	Joe Warlick	Back	Mississippi State
252	Boston Yanks	Courtney Lawlor	Back	Richmond

=== Round 25 ===
Pick #	NFL team	Player	Position	College
253	Chicago Cardinals	John McGinnis	End	Notre Dame
254	Brooklyn Tigers	Dick Manning	Back	USC
255	Detroit Lions	Bob McCarthy	End	St. Mary's (CA)
256	Philadelphia Eagles	Bob Frisbee	Back	Stanford
257	New York Giants	Ben Babula	Back	Fordham
258	Green Bay Packers	Len Liss	Tackle	Marquette
259	Washington Redskins	Smokey Martin	Back	Cornell
260	Chicago Bears	Roy Ruskusky	End	St. Mary's (CA)
261	Pittsburgh Steelers	Howard Tippee	Back	Iowa State
262	Cleveland Rams	Bert Gianelli	Guard	Santa Clara
263	Boston Yanks	Howard Debus	Back	Nebraska

=== Round 26 ===
Pick #	NFL team	Player	Position	College
264	Chicago Cardinals	Warren Hodges	Tackle	Kansas
265	Brooklyn Tigers	Ray Grierson	End	Illinois
266	Detroit Lions	Stan Hendrickson	End	Colorado
267	Pittsburgh Steelers	Charley Malmberg	Tackle	Rice
268	New York Giants	Theophilus Andrew Fitanides	Back	New Hampshire
269	Green Bay Packers	Ray Jordan	Back	North Carolina
270	Washington Redskins	Lee Gustafson	Back	Oregon State
271	Chicago Bears	Harry Franck	Back	Northwestern
272	Philadelphia Eagles	Ed Eiden	Back	Scranton
273	Cleveland Rams	Charley Kuhn	Back	Kentucky
274	Boston Yanks	Bill Portwood	End	Kentucky

=== Round 27 ===
Pick #	NFL team	Player	Position	College
275	Chicago Cardinals	Bill Earley	Back	Notre Dame
276	Brooklyn Tigers	Joe Golding	Back	Oklahoma
277	Detroit Lions	Fred Bouldin	Back	Missouri
278	Philadelphia Eagles	Barney Burdick	End	Creighton
279	New York Giants	Andy Bires	End	Alabama
280	Green Bay Packers	Al Grubaugh	Tackle	Nebraska
281	Washington Redskins	Nick Pappas	Tackle	Utah
282	Chicago Bears	Jack McKewan	Tackle	Alabama
283	Pittsburgh Steelers	Russ Ashbaugh	Back	Notre Dame
284	Cleveland Rams	Jim Smith	Tackle	Colorado
285	Boston Yanks	Harold Collins	Guard	Southwestern (TX)

=== Round 28 ===
Pick #	NFL team	Player	Position	College
286	Chicago Cardinals	Bob Davis	Guard	Oregon
287	Brooklyn Tigers	Bob Zimny	Tackle	Indiana
288	Detroit Lions	Dick McElwee	Back	West Virginia
289	Pittsburgh Steelers	Pat Petroski	Guard	Miami (FL)
290	New York Giants	Tom Rock	End	Columbia
291	Green Bay Packers	A. B. Howard	End	Mississippi State
292	Washington Redskins	Lindsey Bowen	End	Rice
293	Chicago Bears	Charlie Mitchell	Back	Tulsa
294	Philadelphia Eagles	Nick Daukas	Tackle	Dartmouth
295	Cleveland Rams	Ray Donelli	Back	Duquesne
296	Boston Yanks	Aubrey Gill	Center	Texas

=== Round 29 ===
Pick #	NFL team	Player	Position	College
297	Chicago Cardinals	Vince DiFrancesca	Tackle	Northwestern
298	Brooklyn Tigers	Marty Frohm	Tackle	Mississippi State
299	Detroit Lions	Bob Derleth	Tackle	Michigan
300	Philadelphia Eagles	Pasquale Darone	Guard	Boston College
301	New York Giants	Walt Cyhel	Tackle	Creighton
302	Green Bay Packers	Paul Paladino	Guard	Arkansas
303	Washington Redskins	Bill Gustafson	Tackle	Washington State
304	Chicago Bears	Pat Boyle	Guard	Wisconsin
305	Pittsburgh Steelers	Joe Tosti	End	Scranton
306	Cleveland Rams	John Hughes	End	Mississippi State
307	Boston Yanks	Chet Wasilewski	Back	Holy Cross

=== Round 30 ===
Pick #	NFL team	Player	Position	College
308	Chicago Cardinals	Lloyd Ott	Center	NC State
309	Brooklyn Tigers	Howard Blose	Back	Cornell
310	Detroit Lions	George Dick	End	Kansas
311	Pittsburgh Steelers	Len Seelinger	Back	Wisconsin
312	New York Giants	Francis Nelson	Back	Baylor
313	Green Bay Packers	Bob Butchofsky	Back	Texas A&M
314	Washington Redskins	Bill Yablonski	Center	Holy Cross
315	Chicago Bears	Bernie Pepper	Tackle	Missouri
316	Philadelphia Eagles	Bill Clark	Tackle	Colorado College
317	Cleveland Rams	Dick McPhee	Back	Georgia
318	Boston Yanks	Gus Letchas	Back	Georgia

=== Round 31 ===
Pick #	NFL team	Player	Position	College
319	Green Bay Packers	Russ Deal	Guard	Indiana
320	Washington Redskins	Buster Hollingbery	Center	Washington State
321	Chicago Bears	Karl Vogt	Tackle	Villanova
322	Philadelphia Eagles	Pete Pasko	End	East Stroudsburg
323	Cleveland Rams	Jim McLeod	End	LSU
324	Boston Yanks	Ralph Calcagni	Tackle	Penn

=== Round 32 ===
Rnd.	Pick	Team	Player	Pos.	College	Notes
32	325	Green Bay Packers	Frito Gonzales	B	SMU	
32	326	Washington Redskins	Willard Sheller	B	Stanford	
32	327	Chicago Bears	Bob Endres	T	Colgate	
32	328	Philadelphia Eagles	Myron Majewski	T	American International	
32	329	Cleveland Rams	Stan Kudlacz	C	Notre Dame	
32	330	Boston Yanks	Walton Roberts Back	B	Texas	

= Hall of Famer

== Hall of Famers ==
- Otto Graham, quarterback from Northwestern taken 1st round 4th overall by the Detroit Lions.

Inducted: Professional Football Hall of Fame class of 1965.

- Steve Van Buren, halfback from LSU taken 1st round 5th overall by the Philadelphia Eagles.

Inducted: Professional Football Hall of Fame class of 1965.

- Bob Waterfield, quarterback from UCLA taken 5th round 42nd overall by the Cleveland Rams.

Inducted: Professional Football Hall of Fame class of 1965.

- Ed Sprinkle, guard/defensive end from Navy taken undrafted by the Chicago Bears.

Inducted: Professional Football Hall of Fame class of 2020.

== Notable undrafted players ==
^{†}	= Pro Bowler	^{‡}	Hall of Famer

Original NFL team	Player	Pos.	College	Notes
Chicago Bears	Ed Sprinkle^{‡}^{†}	G/DE	Navy	
Cleveland Rams	Don Greenwood	HB/QB	Illinois	
Cleveland Rams	Mike Scarry	C/DT	Waynesburg	
Philadelphia Eagles	Duke Maronic	G/DE		
