= Ed Stofko =

American football player (1920–1988)

No. 25
- Positions: Tailback, defensive back

Personal information
- Born: May 17, 1920; Johnstown, Pennsylvania, U.S.
- Died: December 19, 1988 (aged 68); Johnstown, Pennsylvania, U.S.
- Listed height: 6 ft 1 in (1.85 m)
- Listed weight: 192 lb (87 kg)

Career information
- College: St. Francis
- NFL draft: 1944: 9th round, 85th overall pick

Career history
- Pittsburgh Steelers (1945)

Career NFL statistics
- Passing yards: 94
- TD–INT: 0-4
- Passer rating: 19.9
- Stats at Pro Football Reference

Albert Edward Stofko (May 20, 1920 – December 19, 1988) was a professional football player in the National Football League (NFL). He graduated from Johnstown Pennsylvania High School and attended Saint Francis University in Loretto, Pennsylvania.

== Career ==
Stofko played in the National Football League for just one season in 1945. Stofko was drafted in the ninth round of the 1944 NFL Draft with the 85th overall pick by the "Card-Pitt", a team that was the result of a temporary merger between the Chicago Cardinals and the Pittsburgh Steelers. The teams' merger was a result of the manning shortages experienced league-wide due to World War II. He played for the Pittsburgh Steelers in 1945.

He attempted 17 passes and completed 7 for a 41.2% average. He also punted for a 36.3 yards per punt average.
