= Joe Parker (American football) =

American football player (1923–1998)

No. 47, 81
- Position: End

Personal information
- Born: July 11, 1923; Wichita Falls, Texas, U.S.
- Died: December 27, 1998 (aged 75); Wichita County, Texas, U.S.
- Listed height: 6 ft 1 in (1.85 m)
- Listed weight: 220 lb (100 kg)

Career information
- High school: Wichita Falls
- College: Texas (1940-1943)
- NFL draft: 1944: 5th round, 36th overall pick

Career history
- Chicago Cardinals (1946–1947)

Awards and highlights
- NFL champion (1947); First-team All-American (1943); First-team All-SWC (1943)

Career NFL statistics
- Receptions: 2
- Receiving yards: 17
- Stats at Pro Football Reference

Joseph Jackson Parker (July 11, 1923 – December 27, 1998) was an American professional football end who played for two seasons in the National Football League (NFL) for the Chicago Cardinals from 1946 to 1947.

== University of Texas ==
Parker was inducted into the University of Texas Hall of Honor in 1975. He led Texas to the SWC championship in 1942. He was co-captain of the team in 1943, when they won the SWC championship again. In 1943, he was All-American and All-SWC.

== Professional career ==
Parker was drafted in the fifth round of the 1944 NFL draft by the Philadelphia Eagles. He played with the Chicago Cardinals for two seasons from 1946 to 1947. He was on the 1947 Chicago Cardinals NFL championship team.
