= John Kuzman =

American football player (1915–2008)

No. 24, 47, 41
- Position: Tackle

Personal information
- Born: March 31, 1915; Coaldale, Pennsylvania, U.S.
- Died: January 29, 2008 (aged 92); Boonton, New Jersey, U.S.
- Listed height: 6 ft 1 in (1.85 m)
- Listed weight: 232 lb (105 kg)

Career information
- High school: Bordentown Military Institute (Bordentown, New Jersey)
- College: Fordham (1937-1940)
- NFL draft: 1941: 7th round, 52nd overall pick

Career history
- Chicago Cardinals (1941); San Francisco 49ers (1946); Chicago Rockets (1947); Jersey City Giants (1948–1949)

Career NFL/AAFC statistics
- Games played: 29
- Games started: 8
- Stats at Pro Football Reference

John Kuzman (June 29, 1915 – January 29, 2008) was an American professional football tackle who played in the National Football League (NFL).

== College career ==
Kuzman was a three year starter at tackle for the Fordham Rams. He played in the first televised football game in 1939 as a junior.

== Professional career ==
Kuzman was drafted 52nd overall by the Chicago Cardinals in the seventh round of the 1941 NFL draft. He played one season with the team before joining the Navy after the outbreak of WWII. He was assigned to the Pre-Flight training program at Saint Mary's College of California, where he served as a physical training instructor. Kuzman later was assigned to North Carolina Pre-Flight, where Ted Williams was among the pilot trainees. After the war Kuzman was signed by the San Francisco 49ers and played in the team's inaugural season. He joined the Chicago Rockets, reuniting with former Fordham head coach Jim Crowley, for 1947. Kuzman played for the Jersey City Giants of the minor league American Football League in 1948 and 1949.

== Later life and death ==
Kuzman married Audrey on September 3, 1941. In 1947, Kuzman joined San Francisco State College as a member of the Physical Education Department, before coming to the same role at Rutgers University the following year. He joined the faculty at Saint Michaels High School in Union County, New Jersey, in 1950. Kuzman coached and taught at Bloomfield High School from 1952 to 1954. Between 1954 and 1974 he was a teacher and coach at Bergen County Vocational and Technical High School. Kuzman died on January 29, 2008, at the NJ Firemen’s Home in Boonton, New Jersey.
