= Vic Kulbitski =

American football player (1921–1998)

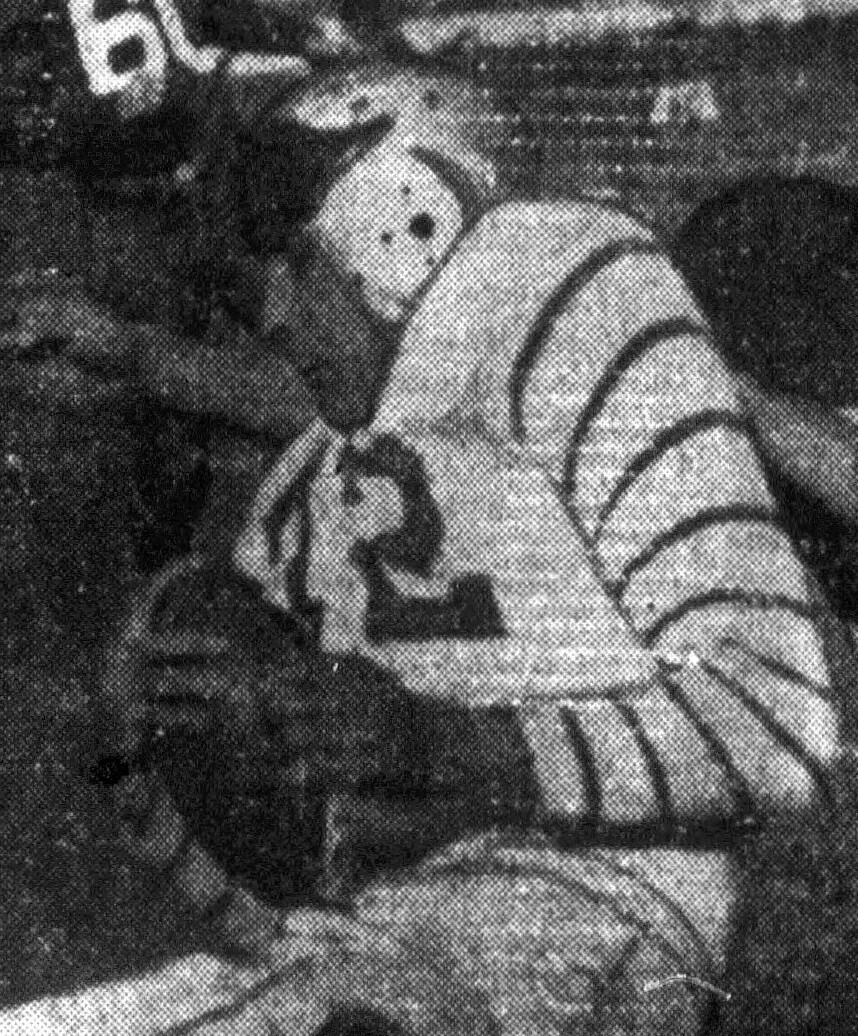
- Kulbitski, circa 1946

No. 72, 75
- Positions: Fullback, linebacker

Personal information
- Born: June 15, 1921; Virginia, Minnesota, U.S.
- Died: May 23, 1998 (aged 76); West St. Paul, Minnesota, U.S.
- Listed height: 5 ft 10 in (1.78 m)
- Listed weight: 205 lb (93 kg)

Career information
- High school: Red Wing (Red Wing, Minnesota)
- College: Minnesota (1941–1942, 1944–1945); Notre Dame (1943)
- NFL draft: 1944: 7th round, 58th overall pick

Career history
- Buffalo Bisons/Bills (1946–1948)

Awards and highlights
- 2× National champion (1941, 1943)

Career AAFC statistics
- Rushing yards: 1,006
- Rushing average: 5.2
- Receptions: 13
- Receiving yards: 154
- Total touchdowns: 8
- Stats at Pro Football Reference

Victor John Kulbitski (June 15, 1921 – May 23, 1998) was an American professional football player who played three seasons with the Buffalo Bisons/Bills of the All-America Football Conference (AAFC). He played college football at the University of Minnesota and the University of Notre Dame.

== Early life and college ==
Victor John Kulbitski was born on June 15, 1921, in Virginia, Minnesota. He attended Red Wing High School in Red Wing, Minnesota.

Kulbitski first played college football for the Minnesota Golden Gophers of the University of Minnesota, and was a two-year letterman from 1941 to 1942. The 1941 Golden Gophers were consensus national champions. He then transferred to the University of Notre Dame, where he played for the Notre Dame Fighting Irish during the 1943 season. The 1943 Fighting Irish were consensus national champions. He then transferred back to the University of Minnesota, and was a letterman again from 1944 to 1945.

== Professional career ==
Kulbitski was selected by the Philadelphia Eagles in the seventh round, with the 58th overall pick, of the 1944 NFL draft. He signed with the Buffalo Bisons of the All-America Football Conference in 1946. He played in 13 games, starting eight, for the Bisons during the 1946 season, recording 97 carries for 605 yards and two touchdowns, one catch for no yards, one interception for 20 yards, and five kick returns for 81 yards. Kulbitski's 6.2 yards per carry were the most in the league that year. He appeared in 13 games, starting seven, for the newly-renamed Buffalo Bills during the 1947 season, totaling 56 rushing attempts for 249 yards and one touchdown, nine receptions for 117 yards and four touchdowns, one interception for 14 yards, one kick return for 19 yards, one punt return for 13 yards, and one of one extra points. He played in all 14 games, starting six, in 1948, accumulating 40 rushes for 152 yards, three catches for 37 yards, one kick return for 18 yards, eight of ten extra points. Kulbitski also appeared in two playoff games that year, rushing two times for one yard while also catching one pass for 14 yards.

== Personal life ==
Kulbitski served in the United States Marine Corps. He died on May 23, 1998, in West St. Paul, Minnesota.
