= Edmund Eiden =

American football player (1921–2017)

No. 62
- Position: Center

Personal information
- Born: November 16, 1921; Scranton, Pennsylvania, U.S.
- Died: January 29, 2017 (aged 95); Springfield, Virginia, U.S.
- Listed height: 6 ft 0 in (1.83 m)
- Listed weight: 205 lb (93 kg)

Career information
- High school: St. Mary's (Scranton)
- College: Scranton (1940-1942)
- NFL draft: 1944: 26th round, 272nd overall pick

Career history
- Detroit Lions (1944)

Career NFL statistics
- Games played: 1
- Stats at Pro Football Reference

Edmund Joseph Francis Eiden (November 16, 1921 – January 29, 2017) was an American professional football center who played one season with the Detroit Lions. He played college football at the University of Scranton, having previously attended St. Mary's High School in Scranton.
