= Marshall Shurnas =

American football player (1922–2006)

No. 53
- Position: End

Personal information
- Born: April 1, 1922; St. Louis, Missouri, U.S.
- Died: August 19, 2006 (aged 84); Columbia, Missouri, U.S.
- Listed height: 6 ft 1 in (1.85 m)
- Listed weight: 205 lb (93 kg)

Career information
- High school: Central
- College: Missouri
- NFL draft: 1944: 17th round, 175th overall pick

Career history
- Cleveland Browns (1947)

Awards and highlights
- AAFC champion (1947); Second-team All-Big Six (1942)

Career AAFC statistics
- Receptions: 2
- Receiving yards: 30
- Stats at Pro Football Reference

Marshall Kenneth "Iggie" Shurnas (April 1, 1922 – August 19, 2006) was an American football end who played one season in the All-America Football Conference (AAFC) for the Cleveland Browns in 1947. Shurnas began his football career at the University of Missouri, playing on teams that won the Big Six Conference in 1941 and 1942. After a stint in the U.S. Army during World War II, he joined the Browns. Cleveland won the AAFC championship in 1947, but Shurnas left after the season for the Buffalo Bills. He did not play in any games for Buffalo, however.

== High school and college ==
Shurnas attended Central High School in St. Louis, Missouri, where he played as an end on the school's football team for three years. He enrolled at the University of Missouri and played for the Missouri Tigers football team in 1941 and 1942. Missouri went undefeated in Big Six Conference play in 1941 and advanced to the Sugar Bowl, but lost the game to Fordham 2–0. The following year, Shurnas was named to an All-Big Six second-team by the Associated Press as Missouri finished with an 8–3–1 win-loss-tie record and won the conference again under head coach Don Faurot.

Shurnas next enlisted in the U.S. Army during World War II and did not play football until his discharge in 1946, when he returned to Missouri. Shurnas decided to delay a professional career to get back in shape, he said at the time. "Though I tried to keep in good condition in the service, I was far from my best last year," he said in 1947. Shurnas finished his college degree that July.

== Professional football career ==
Shurnas had been drafted in the 17th round by the Boston Yanks of the National Football League in 1944 while he was still in the Army. When he was discharged, he signed with the Cleveland Browns of the All-America Football Conference. The Browns finished with a 12–1–1 record in 1947 and won the AAFC championship. Shurnas was a third-string right end, playing mainly on defense behind starter Dante Lavelli and John Yonakor. He joined the Buffalo Bills the following year, but did not play in a game for the team.
