= Barry French (American football) =

American football player (1922–1990)

- Barry French, 1949

No. 35, 67
- Positions: Guard, tackle

Personal information
- Born: February 12, 1922; Chamberlain, South Dakota, U.S.
- Died: March 16, 1990 (aged 68); Vero Beach, Florida, U.S.
- Listed height: 6 ft 0 in (1.83 m)
- Listed weight: 225 lb (102 kg)

Career information
- High school: Washington (SD)
- College: Purdue
- NFL draft: 1951: 4th round, 45th overall pick

Career history
- Baltimore Colts (1947-1950); Ottawa Rough Riders (1951)*; Detroit Lions (1951)
- * Offseason or practice squad member only

Career NFL/AAFC statistics
- Games played: 49
- Games started: 29
- Stats at Pro Football Reference

Barry Alden French (February 12, 1922 – March 16, 1990) was an American football lineman who played at both the guard and tackle positions. He played college football for Purdue in 1941, 1942, and 1946, and professional football for the Baltimore Colts from 1947 to 1950 and the Detroit Lions in 1951.

== Early life ==
French was born in 1922 at Chamberlain, South Dakota. He attended Washington High School in Sioux Falls, South Dakota, graduating in 1940. He enrolled at Purdue University and was awarded the freshman merit trophy at the close of spring football practice in 1941 He played at the tackle position for the Purdue Boilermakers varsity football team in 1941, 1942, and 1946. His college career was interrupted by service in the Army during World War II.

== Professional football ==
In March 1947, he signed with the played professional football with the Baltimore Colts of the All-America Football Conference. He played at the tackle and guard positions for the Colts, starting all 14 games during the 1947 season. He missed the 1948 season after both bones in his left forearm were broken during training camp. He also missed part of the 1949 season when the same arm was rebroken in training camp.

He came back from the injuries, returning to the Colts for the last half of the 1949 season. In 1950, he started 11 games for the Colts. He concluded his professional football career in 1951, appearing in 12 games for the Detroit Lions.

French appeared in a total of 50 games for the Colts and Lions, including 29 as a starter.

== Family and later years ==
French married Jeanne d' Arc Phillips in 1950. He died in 1990 in Vero Beach, Florida.
