= Nick Daukas =

American football player (1922–2003)

No. 42, 40
- Position: Tackle

Personal information
- Born: December 11, 1922; Nashua, New Hampshire, U.S.
- Died: February 25, 2003 (aged 80); Middletown, Connecticut, U.S.
- Listed height: 6 ft 4 in (1.93 m)
- Listed weight: 225 lb (102 kg)

Career information
- High school: Cushing Academy (Ashburnham, Massachusetts)
- College: Dartmouth (1940-1942)
- NFL draft: 1944: 28th round, 294th overall pick

Career history
- Brooklyn Dodgers (1946-1947)

Career AAFC statistics
- Games played: 15
- Games started: 2
- Interceptions: 1
- Stats at Pro Football Reference

Nicholas James Daukas (December 11, 1922 – February 25, 2003) was an American professional football tackle.

Daukas was born in Nashua, New Hampshire, in 1922 and attended Cushing High School. He played college football at Dartmouth. He served in the Army during World War II and in the Korean War after receiving his degree from Dartmouth.

He was selected by the Philadelphia Eagles in the 28th round of the 1944 NFL draft but never played for the Eagles. He played in the All-America Football Conference (AAFC) for the Brooklyn Dodgers in 1946 and 1947. He appeared in a total of 15 football games, two of them as a starter. His older brother Lou Daukas also played for the Dodgers in 1947.

Daukas later became a medical doctor and assistant professor at Yale Medical School. He lived in Middletown, Connecticut, from 1956 until his death. He died in 2003 in Middletown.
