= George Cheverko =

American football player (1920–1977)

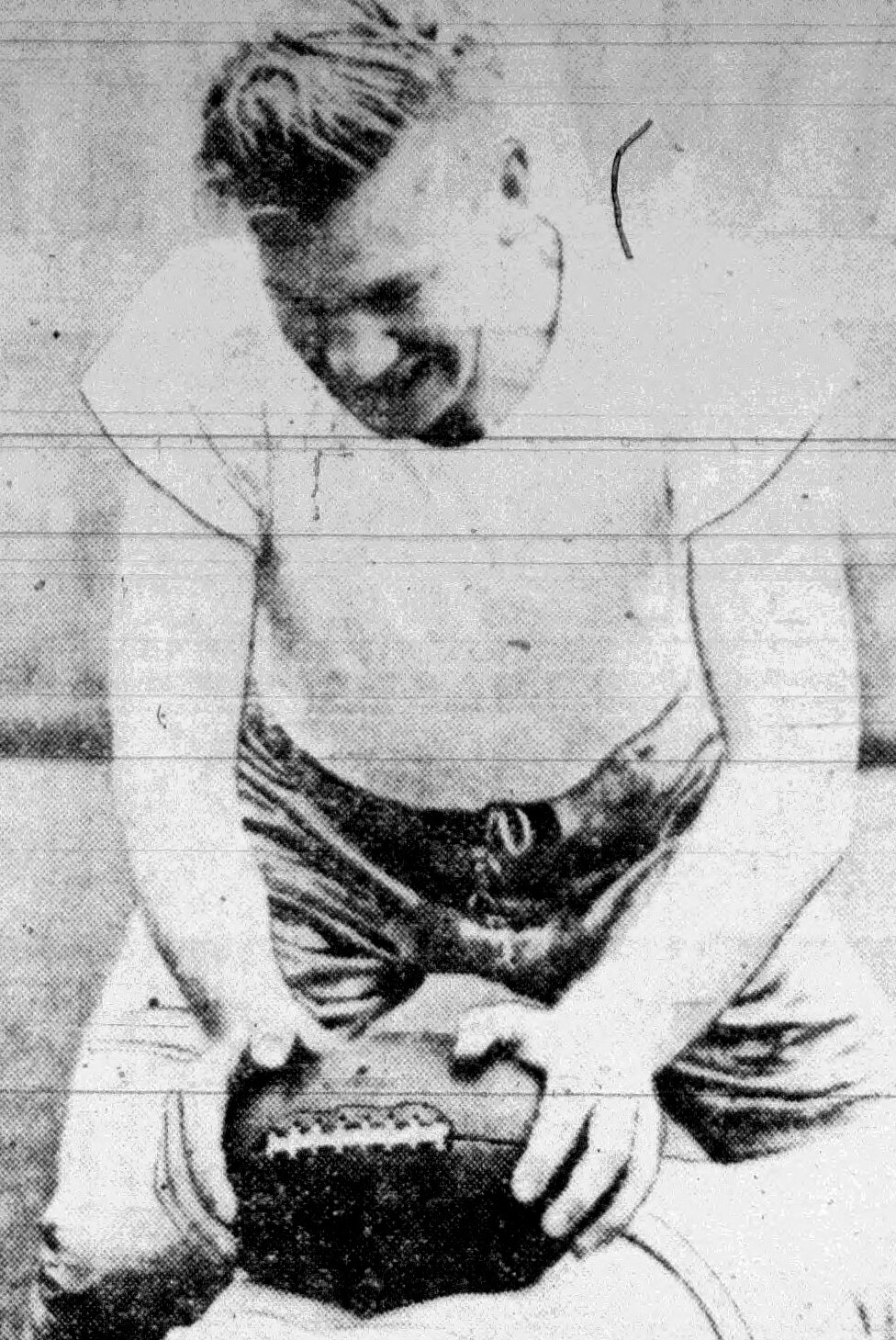
- Cheverko, circa 1942

No. 17, 18
- Position: Back

Personal information
- Born: July 29, 1920; Beaver Meadows, Pennsylvania, U.S.
- Died: November 14, 1977 (aged 57)
- Listed height: 6 ft 1 in (1.85 m)
- Listed weight: 197 lb (89 kg)

Career information
- College: Fordham
- NFL draft: 1944: 7th round, 64th overall pick

Career history
- New York Giants (1947–1948); Washington Redskins (1948)

Career NFL statistics
- Rushing yards: 73
- Rushing average: 3.3
- Receptions: 18
- Receiving yards: 341
- Total touchdowns: 3
- Stats at Pro Football Reference

George Francis Cheverko (July 29, 1920 – November 14, 1977) was an American professional football running back in the National Football League for the New York Giants and the Washington Redskins. He played college football at Fordham University and was drafted 64th overall in the seventh round of the 1944 NFL draft by the Cleveland Rams. Cheverko was inducted into the Fordham University Hall of Fame in 1978.
