= John Perko (American football, born 1918) =

American football player (1918–1984)

No. 33
- Position: Guard

Personal information
- Born: April 8, 1918; Ely, Minnesota, U.S.
- Died: June 7, 1984 (aged 66); Hibbing, Minnesota, U.S.
- Listed height: 6 ft 1 in (1.85 m)
- Listed weight: 235 lb (107 kg)

Career information
- High school: Ely
- College: Minnesota (1941-1942); Notre Dame (1943)
- NFL draft: 1944: 10th round, 96th overall pick

Career history
- Buffalo Bisons (1946)

Awards and highlights
- National champion (1943)

Career AAFC statistics
- Games played: 14
- Games started: 10
- Stats at Pro Football Reference

John Francis Perko (April 8, 1918 – June 7, 1984) was an American professional football offensive guard who played one season for the Buffalo Bisons of the All-America Football Conference (AAFC). He served in the U.S. Marine Corps. Perko died in 1984, at the age of 66.
