= 1948 AAFC season =

American football season

AAFC teams: West, East

The 1948 AAFC season was the third season of the All-America Football Conference. As was the case with the previous two seasons, the league included eight teams, broken up into Eastern and Western divisions, which played a 14-game official schedule that would culminate in a league Championship Game.

In an interesting wrinkle, a tie in the Eastern standings necessitated the first tiebreaker playoff game played by the league. The Buffalo Bills played the Baltimore Colts in Baltimore for the right to play in the AAFC Championship game.

== Draft ==
The league's second collegiate draft was held on December 17, 1947 in New York. Tony Minisi was the first overall selection.

== Season ==
The AAFC season began on August 27 with two games: New York played Brooklyn at home that resulted in a 21-3 victory for the Yankees while Los Angeles played Chicago at home that saw the Dons win 7-0. Two days later, Week 1 ended with the San Francisco 49ers pummeling the Buffalo Bills 35-14. All eight teams played in Week 2 that saw the Cleveland Browns (who had ended the previous season with eight straight games of wins or ties) win their home opener 19-14 over the Los Angeles Dons.

In an attempt to drive up interest, the Browns were scheduled for three games in the span of a week. They began the stretch with a 34-21 defeat of the Yankees in front of over 50,000 on the Sunday before Thanksgiving. Four days later on Thanksgiving Day, the Browns were in Los Angeles to play the Dons at the Coliseum and pulled away with a 31-14 victory. Three days later, with an ailing Otto Graham, the Browns rallied with 21 points in the third quarter to overcome a tight deficit and defeat the San Francisco 49ers to achieve the feat of winning three games in the span of a week.

The 49ers finished second place in the Western Division at 12–2. The quarterbacks of the two outstanding teams, Cleveland's Otto Graham and San Francisco's Frankie Albert, shared the MVP. In the East, Buffalo and Baltimore were both tied at 7–7, just ahead of 6–8 New York. Buffalo won the playoff game held in Baltimore. The Browns then won the championship by a score of 49–7 to complete an undefeated season.

=== 1948 AAFC final standings ===
W = Wins, L = Losses, T = Ties, Pct. = Winning Percentage
PF = Points Scored For, PA = Point Scored Against

AAFC Eastern Division
	W	L	T	PCT	DIV	PF	PA	STK
Buffalo Bills	7	7	0	.500	4–2	360	358	L1
Baltimore Colts	7	7	0	.500	5–1	333	327	W2
New York Yankees	6	8	0	.429	3–3	265	301	W1
Brooklyn Dodgers	2	12	0	.143	0–6	253	387	L6

Note: Tie games were not officially counted in the standings.

AAFC Western Division
	W	L	T	PCT	DIV	PF	PA	STK
Cleveland Browns	14	0	0	1.000	6–0	389	190	W14
San Francisco 49ers	12	2	0	.857	4–2	495	248	W1
Los Angeles Dons	7	7	0	.500	2–4	258	305	L2
Chicago Rockets	1	13	0	.071	0–6	202	439	L11

Note: Tie games were not officially counted in the standings.

== Championship game ==
- AAFC Eastern Playoff: Buffalo 28, Baltimore 17
- AAFC Championship: Cleveland 49, Buffalo 7
