= List of NFL annual interceptions leaders =

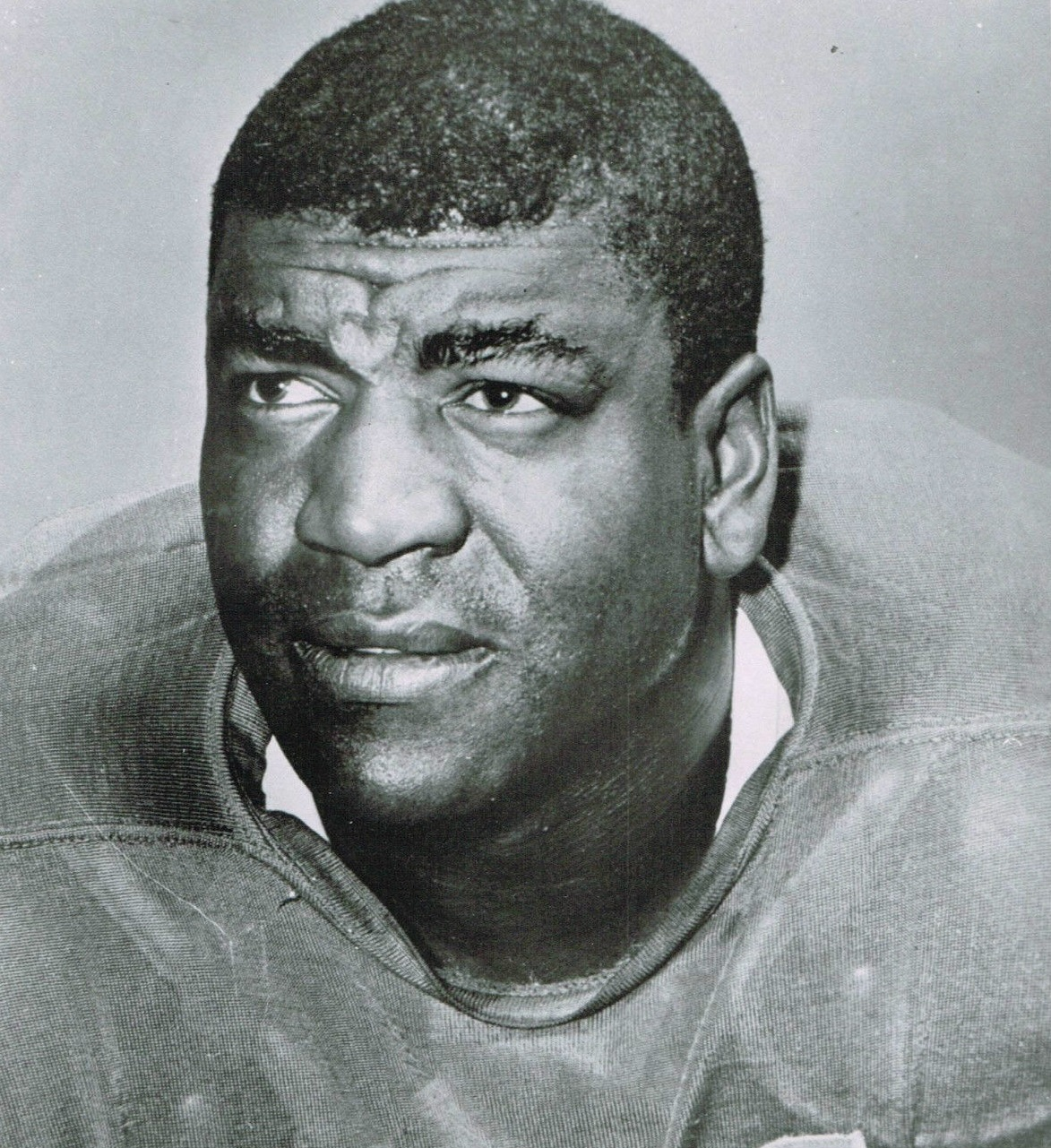
Night Train Lane led the league in interceptions as a rookie in 1952. In doing so, he also set the current record for most interceptions in a season.

In American football, an interception (INT), also known as a pick, occurs when a pass intended for a player of the same team is caught by an opposition player, who then gains possession for their team. The National Football League (NFL) did not begin keeping official records until the 1932 season and did not begin tracking interceptions until 1940. In addition to the NFL interception leaders, league record books recognize the interception leaders of the American Football League (AFL), which operated from 1960 to 1969 before being absorbed into the NFL in 1970. The NFL also recognizes the statistics of the All-America Football Conference, which operated from 1946 to 1949 before three of its teams were merged into the NFL, since 2025.

The single-season interception record is held by Night Train Lane, who logged 14 interceptions in 1952 while playing for the Los Angeles Rams as a rookie. Prior to that, Dan Sandifer of the Washington Redskins and Spec Sanders of the New York Yanks jointly held the record, earning 13 interceptions in 1948 and 1950 respectively. The record for most seasons leading the league in interceptions is three. This was first achieved by Everson Walls, who led the league in interceptions in 1981, 1982, and again in 1985. Ed Reed was later able to match Walls by leading the league in 2004, 2008, and 2010. Bill Bradley became the first player to lead the league in interceptions in consecutive seasons (1971 and 1972), with Everson Walls being the only other player to do so (1981 and 1982). The most recent player to lead the league in interceptions is Kevin Byard of the Chicago Bears, who finished with seven interceptions in the 2025 NFL season.

== NFL annual interceptions leaders ==
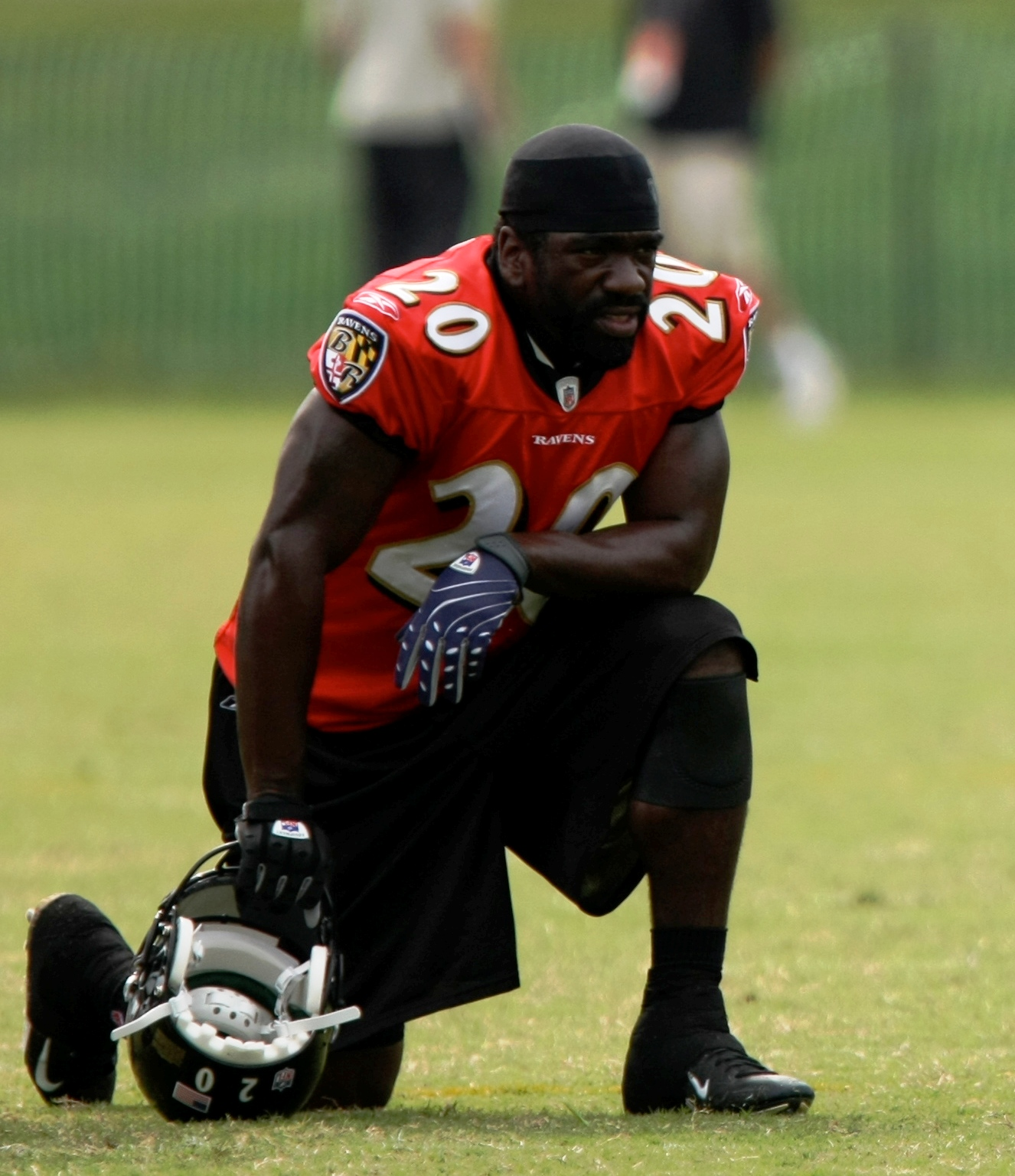
Ed Reed is one of two players to lead the league in interceptions a record three times (2004, 2008, and 2010). He also holds the record for most career interception return yardage.

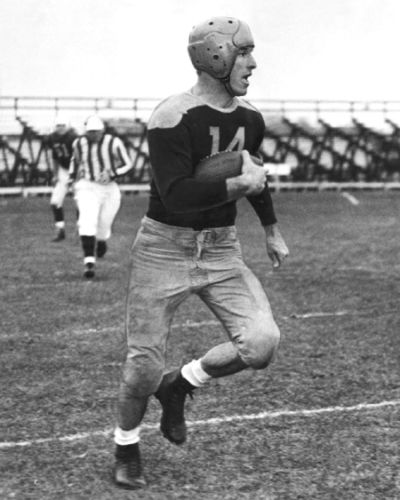
Don Hutson, a two-way player, co-led the league in interceptions in 1940. He also led the league in scoring and receiving touchdowns that same year.

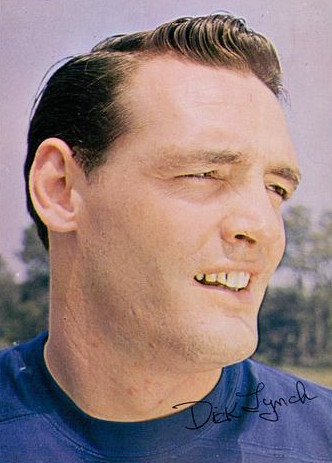
Dick Lynch led the league twice during the 1960s while playing for the New York Giants.

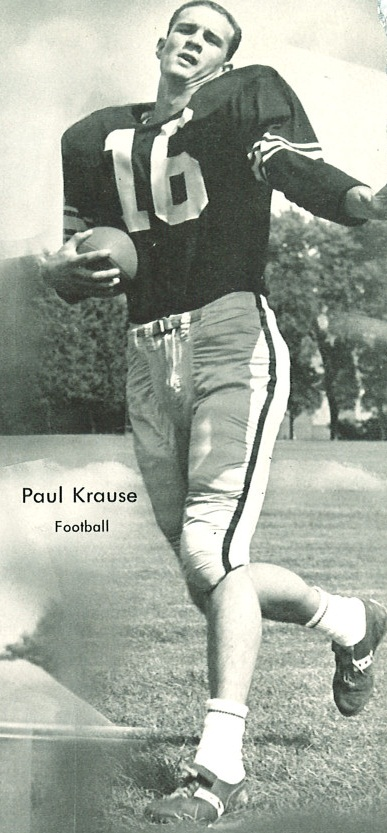
Paul Krause, the career leader in interceptions, led the league in 1964.

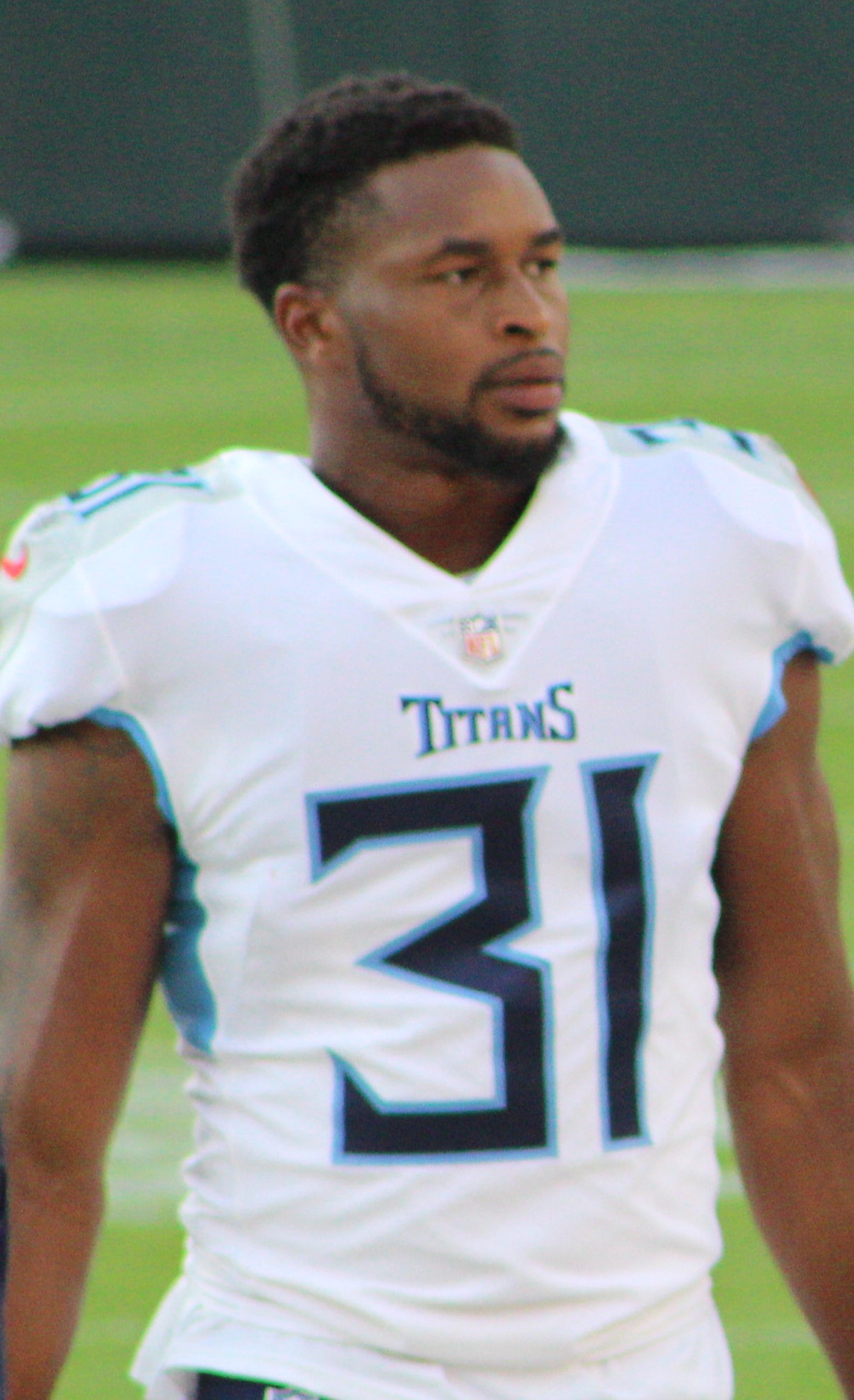
Kevin Byard led the NFL in interceptions in 2017 and in 2025.

Key
Symbol	Meaning
Leader	The player who recorded the most interceptions in the NFL
Ints	The total number of interceptions the player had
TDs	The number of interceptions returned for a touchdown by the player (pick-sixes)
GP	The number of games played by a player during the season
†	Inducted into the Pro Football Hall of Fame
^	Active player
*	Set the single-season interception record
(#)	Denotes the number of times a player appears in this list

NFL annual interceptions leaders by season
Season	Leader	Ints	TDs	GP	Team	Refs
1940	Don Hutson†	6*	0	11	Green Bay Packers	
1940	Ace Parker†	6*	1	11	Brooklyn Dodgers	
1940	Kent Ryan	6*	0	10	Detroit Lions	
1941	Marshall Goldberg	7*	0	11	Chicago Cardinals	
1941	Art Jones	7*	0	11	Pittsburgh Steelers	
1942	Bulldog Turner†	8*	1	11	Chicago Bears	
1943	Sammy Baugh†	11*	0	10	Washington Redskins	
1944	Howie Livingston	9	1	10	New York Giants	
1945	Roy Zimmerman	7	0	10	Philadelphia Eagles	
1946	Bill Dudley†	10	1	11	Pittsburgh Steelers	
1947	Frank Reagan	10	0	10	New York Giants	
1947	Frank Seno	10	0	10	Boston Yanks	
1948	Dan Sandifer	13*	2	12	Washington Redskins	
1949	Bob Nussbaumer	12	0	12	Chicago Cardinals	
1950	Spec Sanders	13	0	12	New York Yanks	
1951	Otto Schnellbacher	11	2	12	New York Giants	
1952	Night Train Lane†	14*	2	12	Los Angeles Rams	
1953	Jack Christiansen†	12	1	12	Detroit Lions	
1954	Night Train Lane† (2)	10	0	12	Chicago Cardinals	
1955	Will Sherman	11	0	12	Los Angeles Rams	
1956	Lindon Crow	11	0	12	Chicago Cardinals	
1957	Jack Butler†	10	0	12	Pittsburgh Steelers	
1957	Jack Christiansen† (2)	10	1	10	Detroit Lions	
1957	Milt Davis	10	2	12	Baltimore Colts	
1958	Jimmy Patton	11	0	11	New York Giants	
1959	Milt Davis (2)	7	1	11	Baltimore Colts	
1959	Dean Derby	7	0	12	Pittsburgh Steelers	
1959	Don Shinnick	7	0	12	Baltimore Colts	
1960	Dave Baker	10	0	12	San Francisco 49ers	
1960	Jerry Norton	10	0	12	St. Louis Cardinals	
1961	Dick Lynch	9	0	14	New York Giants	
1962	Willie Wood†	9	0	14	Green Bay Packers	
1963	Dick Lynch (2)	9	3	14	New York Giants	
1963	Rosey Taylor	9	1	14	Chicago Bears	
1964	Paul Krause†	12	1	14	Washington Redskins	
1965	Bobby Boyd	9	1	14	Baltimore Colts	
1966	Larry Wilson†	10	2	14	St. Louis Cardinals	
1967	Lem Barney†	10	3	14	Detroit Lions	
1967	Dave Whitsell	10	2	14	New Orleans Saints	
1968	Willie Williams	10	0	14	New York Giants	
1969	Mel Renfro†	10	0	14	Dallas Cowboys	
1970	Johnny Robinson†	10	0	14	Kansas City Chiefs	
1971	Bill Bradley	11	0	14	Philadelphia Eagles	
1972	Bill Bradley (2)	9	0	14	Philadelphia Eagles	
1973	Dick Anderson	8	2	14	Miami Dolphins	
1973	Mike Wagner	8	0	14	Pittsburgh Steelers	
1974	Emmitt Thomas†	12	2	14	Kansas City Chiefs	
1975	Mel Blount†	11	0	14	Pittsburgh Steelers	
1976	Monte Jackson	10	3	14	Los Angeles Rams	
1977	Lyle Blackwood	10	0	14	Baltimore Colts	
1978	Thom Darden	10	0	16	Cleveland Browns	
1979	Mike Reinfeldt	12	0	16	Houston Oilers	
1980	Lester Hayes	13	1	16	Oakland Raiders	
1981	Everson Walls	11	0	16	Dallas Cowboys	
1982	Everson Walls (2)	7	0	9	Dallas Cowboys	
1983	Mark Murphy	9	0	15	Washington Redskins	
1984	Kenny Easley†	10	2	16	Seattle Seahawks	
1985	Everson Walls (3)	9	0	16	Dallas Cowboys	
1986	Ronnie Lott†	10	1	14	San Francisco 49ers	
1987	Barry Wilburn	9	1	12	Washington Redskins	
1988	Scott Case	10	0	16	Atlanta Falcons	
1989	Felix Wright	9	1	16	Cleveland Browns	
1990	Mark Carrier	10	0	16	Chicago Bears	
1991	Ronnie Lott† (2)	8	0	16	Los Angeles Raiders	
1992	Henry Jones	8	2	16	Buffalo Bills	
1992	Audray McMillian	8	2	16	Minnesota Vikings	
1993	Nate Odomes	9	0	16	Buffalo Bills	
1993	Eugene Robinson	9	0	16	Seattle Seahawks	
1994	Eric Turner	9	1	16	Cleveland Browns	
1994	Aeneas Williams†	9	0	16	Arizona Cardinals	
1995	Orlando Thomas	9	1	16	Minnesota Vikings	
1996	Tyrone Braxton	9	1	16	Denver Broncos	
1996	Keith Lyle	9	0	16	St. Louis Rams	
1997	Ryan McNeil	9	1	16	St. Louis Rams	
1998	Ty Law†	9	1	16	New England Patriots	
1999	Donnie Abraham	7	2	16	Tampa Bay Buccaneers	
1999	James Hasty	7	2	15	Kansas City Chiefs	
1999	Sam Madison	7	1	16	Miami Dolphins	
1999	Troy Vincent	7	0	14	Philadelphia Eagles	
1999	Rod Woodson†	7	2	16	Baltimore Ravens	
2000	Darren Sharper	9	0	16	Green Bay Packers	
2001	Ronde Barber†	10	1	16	Tampa Bay Buccaneers	
2001	Anthony Henry	10	1	16	Cleveland Browns	
2002	Brian Kelly	8	0	16	Tampa Bay Buccaneers	
2002	Rod Woodson† (2)	8	2	16	Oakland Raiders	
2003	Tony Parrish	9	0	16	San Francisco 49ers	
2003	Brian Russell	9	0	16	Minnesota Vikings	
2004	Ed Reed†	9	1	16	Baltimore Ravens	
2005	Ty Law† (2)	10	1	16	New York Jets	
2005	Deltha O'Neal	10	0	15	Cincinnati Bengals	
2006	Champ Bailey†	10	1	16	Denver Broncos	
2006	Asante Samuel	10	0	15	New England Patriots	
2007	Antonio Cromartie	10	1	16	San Diego Chargers	
2008	Ed Reed† (2)	9	2	16	Baltimore Ravens	
2009	Jairus Byrd	9	0	14	Buffalo Bills	
2009	Asante Samuel (2)	9	0	16	Philadelphia Eagles	
2009	Darren Sharper (2)	9	3	14	New Orleans Saints	
2009	Charles Woodson†	9	3	16	Green Bay Packers	
2010	Ed Reed† (3)	8	0	10	Baltimore Ravens	
2011	Kyle Arrington	7	0	16	New England Patriots	
2011	Eric Weddle	7	0	16	San Diego Chargers	
2011	Charles Woodson† (2)	7	1	15	Green Bay Packers	
2012	Tim Jennings	9	1	14	Chicago Bears	
2013	Richard Sherman	8	1	16	Seattle Seahawks	
2014	Glover Quin	7	0	16	Detroit Lions	
2015	Reggie Nelson	8	0	16	Cincinnati Bengals	
2015	Marcus Peters	8	2	16	Kansas City Chiefs	
2016	Casey Hayward	7	1	16	San Diego Chargers	
2017	Kevin Byard^	8	0	16	Tennessee Titans	
2017	Darius Slay	8	0	16	Detroit Lions	
2018	Kyle Fuller	7	0	16	Chicago Bears	
2018	Xavien Howard	7	0	12	Miami Dolphins	
2018	Damontae Kazee	7	0	16	Atlanta Falcons	
2019	Stephon Gilmore	6	2	16	New England Patriots	
2019	Anthony Harris	6	1	14	Minnesota Vikings	
2019	Tre'Davious White^	6	0	15	Buffalo Bills	
2020	Xavien Howard (2)	10	0	16	Miami Dolphins	
2021	Trevon Diggs^	11	2	16	Dallas Cowboys	
2022	Minkah Fitzpatrick^	6	1	15	Pittsburgh Steelers	
2022	C. J. Gardner-Johnson	6	0	12	Philadelphia Eagles	
2022	Justin Simmons	6	0	12	Denver Broncos	
2022	Riq Woolen^	6	1	17	Seattle Seahawks	
2023	DaRon Bland^	9	5	17	Dallas Cowboys	
2024	Kerby Joseph^	9	1	17	Detroit Lions	
2025	Kevin Byard^ (2)	7	0	17	Chicago Bears	

== AFL annual interceptions leaders ==
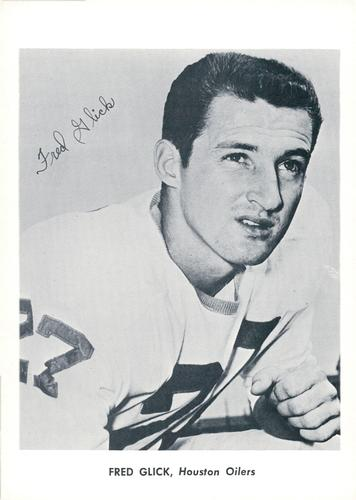
Fred Glick held the AFL single-season record for interceptions with 12.

Key
Symbol	Meaning
Leader	The player who recorded the most interceptions in the AFL
Ints	The total number of interceptions the player had
TDs	The number of interceptions returned for a touchdown by the player (pick-sixes)
GP	The number of games played by a player during the season
†	Pro Football Hall of Fame member
*	Player set the single-season interception record
(#)	Denotes the number of times a player appears in this list

AFL annual interceptions leaders by season
Season	Player	Ints	TDs	GP	Team	Refs
1960	Goose Gonsoulin	11*	0	14	Denver Broncos	
1961	Billy Atkins	10	0	14	Buffalo Bills	
1962	Lee Riley	11	0	14	New York Titans	
1963	Fred Glick	12*	1	14	Houston Oilers	
1964	Dainard Paulson	12	1	14	New York Jets	
1965	W. K. Hicks	9	0	14	Houston Oilers	
1966	Bobby Hunt	10	0	14	Kansas City Chiefs	
1966	Johnny Robinson†	10	1	14	Kansas City Chiefs	
1967	Miller Farr	10	3	14	Houston Oilers	
1967	Tom Janik	10	2	14	Buffalo Bills	
1967	Dick Westmoreland	10	1	14	Miami Dolphins	
1968	Dave Grayson	10	1	14	Oakland Raiders	
1969	Emmitt Thomas†	9	1	14	Kansas City Chiefs	

== AAFC annual interceptions leaders ==
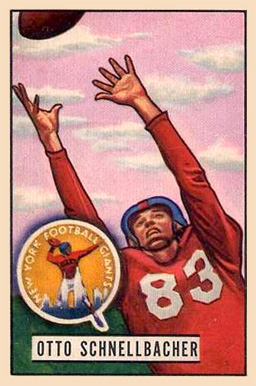
Otto Schnellbacher set the all-time AAFC record for interceptions with 11 in 1948. He then became the first person to have led two different leagues in interceptions for a season when he intercepted eleven passes in 1951 for the NFL New York Giants in what was his final season.

Key
Symbol	Meaning
Player(s)	The player(s) who recorded the most interceptions in the AAFC
Ints	The total number of interceptions the player(s) had
TDs	The number of interceptions returned for a touchdown by the player (pick-sixes)
GP	The number of games played by the player(s) during the season
*	Player set the single-season interception record
(#)	Denotes the number of times a player appears in this list

AAFC annual interceptions leaders by season
Season	Player	Ints	TDs	GP	Team	Refs
1946	Tommy Colella	10*	0	14	Cleveland Browns	
1947	Tommy Colella (2)	6	1	14	Cleveland Browns	
1947	Len Eshmont	6	0	13	San Francisco 49ers	
1947	Bill Kellagher	6	0	14	Chicago Rockets	
1948	Otto Schnellbacher	11*	1	14	New York Yankees	
1949	Jim Cason	9	0	12	San Francisco 49ers	

== Most seasons leading the league ==
Count	Player	Seasons	Team(s)	Refs
3	Ed Reed	2004, 2008, 2010	Baltimore Ravens	
3	Everson Walls	1981, 1982, 1985	Dallas Cowboys	
2	Bill Bradley	1971, 1972	Philadelphia Eagles	
2	Kevin Byard	2017, 2025	Tennessee Titans / Chicago Bears	
2	Jack Christiansen	1953, 1957	Detroit Lions	
2	Tommy Colella	1946, 1947	Cleveland Browns	
2	Milt Davis	1957, 1959	Baltimore Colts	
2	Xavien Howard	2018, 2020	Miami Dolphins	
2	Night Train Lane	1952, 1954	Los Angeles Rams / Chicago Cardinals	
2	Ty Law	1998, 2005	New England Patriots / New York Jets	
2	Ronnie Lott	1986, 1991	San Francisco 49ers / Los Angeles Raiders	
2	Dick Lynch	1961, 1963	New York Giants	
2	Johnny Robinson	1966, 1970	Kansas City Chiefs	
2	Asante Samuel	2006, 2009	New England Patriots / Philadelphia Eagles	
2	Otto Schnellbacher	1948, 1951	New York Yankees / New York Giants	
2	Darren Sharper	2000, 2009	Green Bay Packers / New Orleans Saints	
2	Emmitt Thomas	1969, 1974	Kansas City Chiefs	
2	Charles Woodson	2009, 2011	Green Bay Packers	
2	Rod Woodson	1999, 2002	Baltimore Ravens / Oakland Raiders	

== See also ==
- List of NFL career interceptions leaders
- List of NFL annual forced fumbles leaders
- List of NFL annual sacks leaders
