= List of NFL annual scoring leaders =

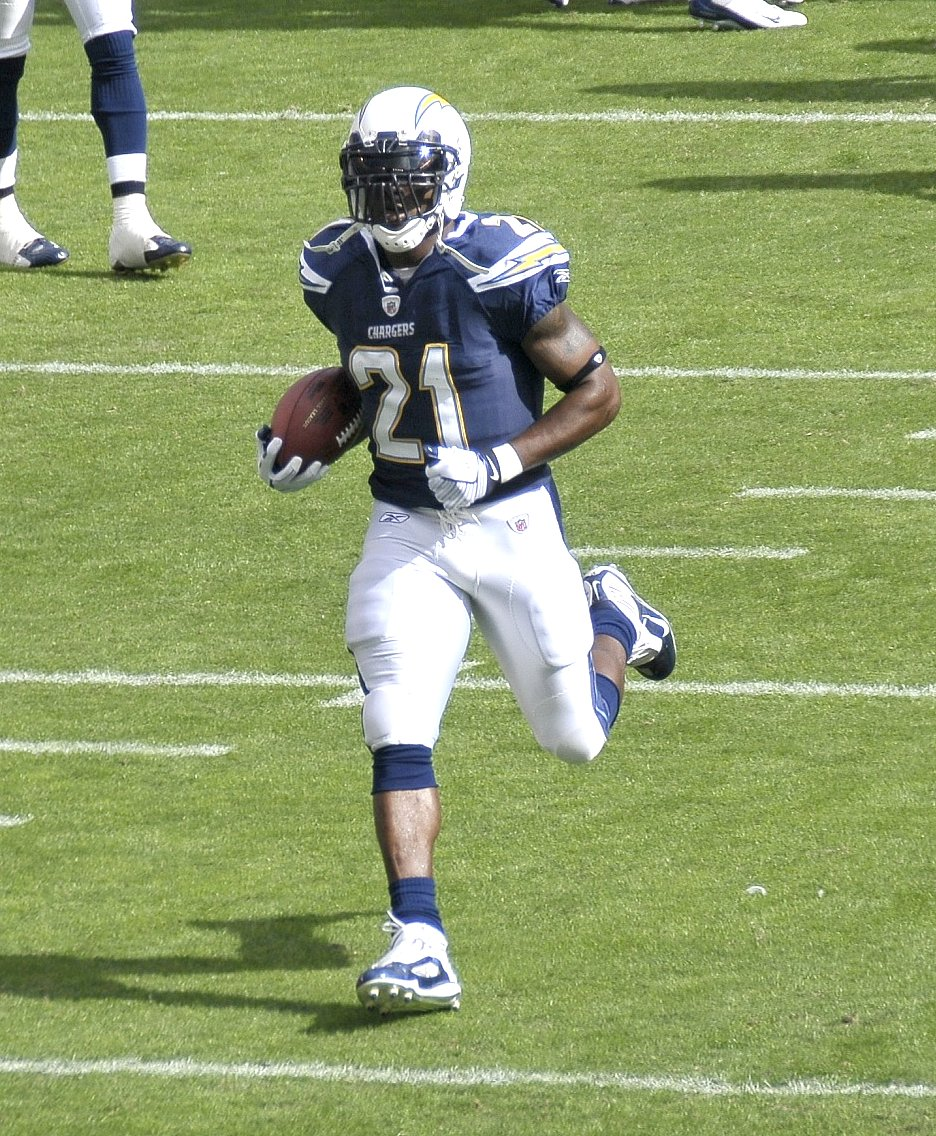
LaDainian Tomlinson holds the single-season scoring record with 186 in 2006.

In American football, scoring can be achieved via touchdown (six points), a field goal (three points), a safety (two points), or by conversion try. After a touchdown is scored, a team will attempt a conversion try, often called the point after touchdown (PAT), for either one or two points. The National Football League (NFL) did not begin keeping official records until the 1932 season. In addition to the NFL scoring leaders, league record books recognize the scoring leaders of the American Football League (AFL), which operated from 1960 to 1969 before being absorbed into the NFL in 1970. For statistical purposes, a player is credited with points scored when they kick a field goal, cause a safety, convert a PAT, or score a touchdown.

The single-season scoring record is held by LaDainian Tomlinson of the San Diego Chargers who, in 2006, scored 186 points and broke the 46-year-old record held by Paul Hornung. Three players, Gino Cappelletti, Don Hutson, and Stephen Gostkowski, have led the league a record five times each, all having done so in at least four consecutive seasons. Hutson however is the only one to have led in five consecutive seasons.

== NFL annual scoring leaders ==
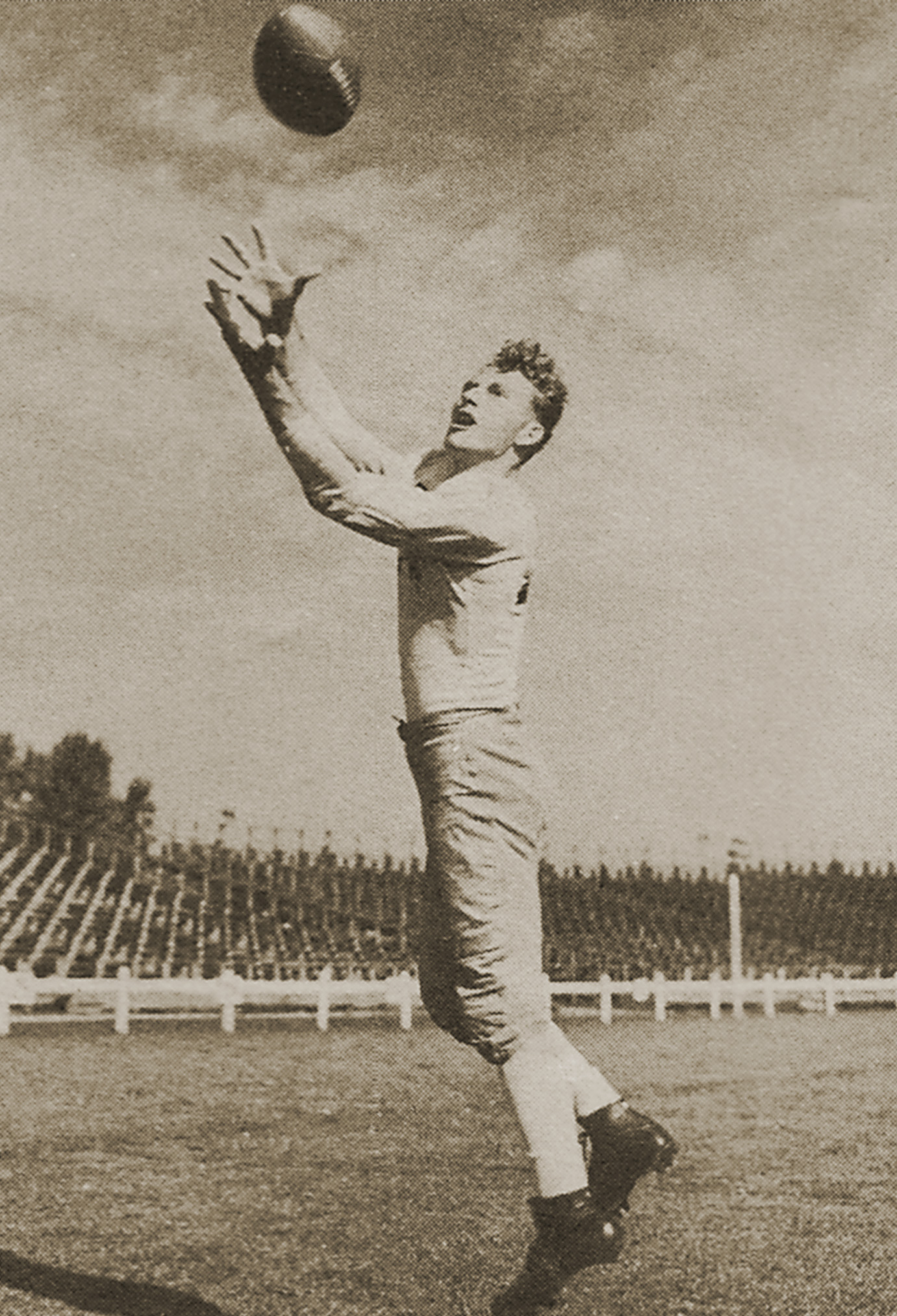
Don Hutson led the league in a record five consecutive seasons from 1940–1944. Hutson is also tied for the most seasons leading the league in points, with five.

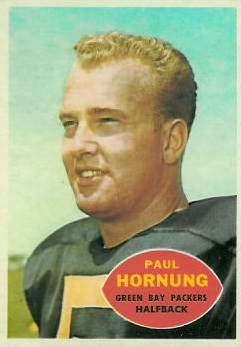
Paul Hornung set the single-season record in 1960 while playing for the Green Bay Packers, a record that stood for 46 years.

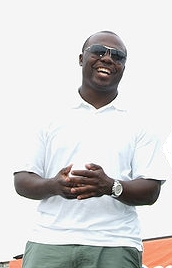
Marshall Faulk led the league in back-to-back seasons in 2000 and 2001.

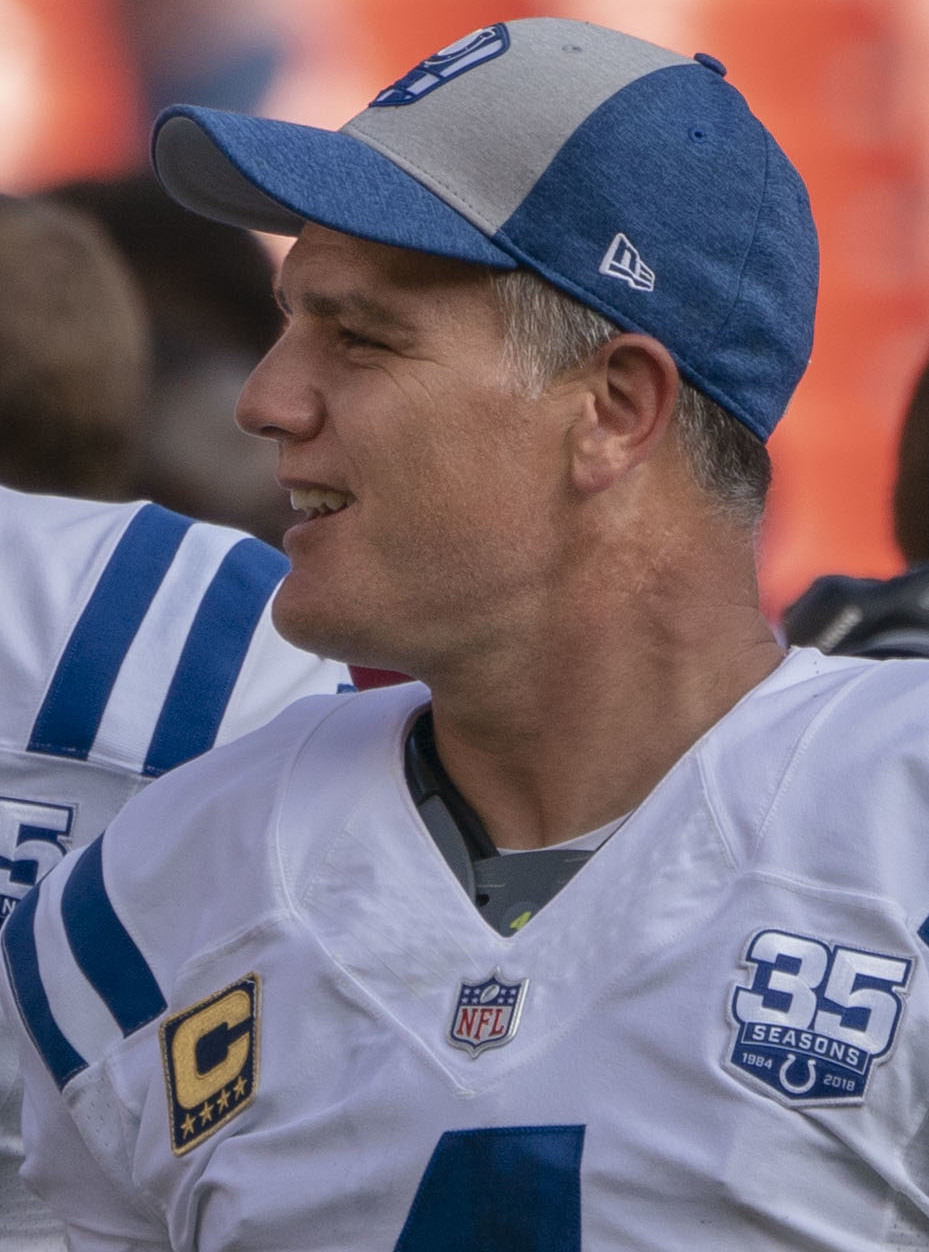
Adam Vinatieri is the all-time leader in points scored and led the league in points in 2004.

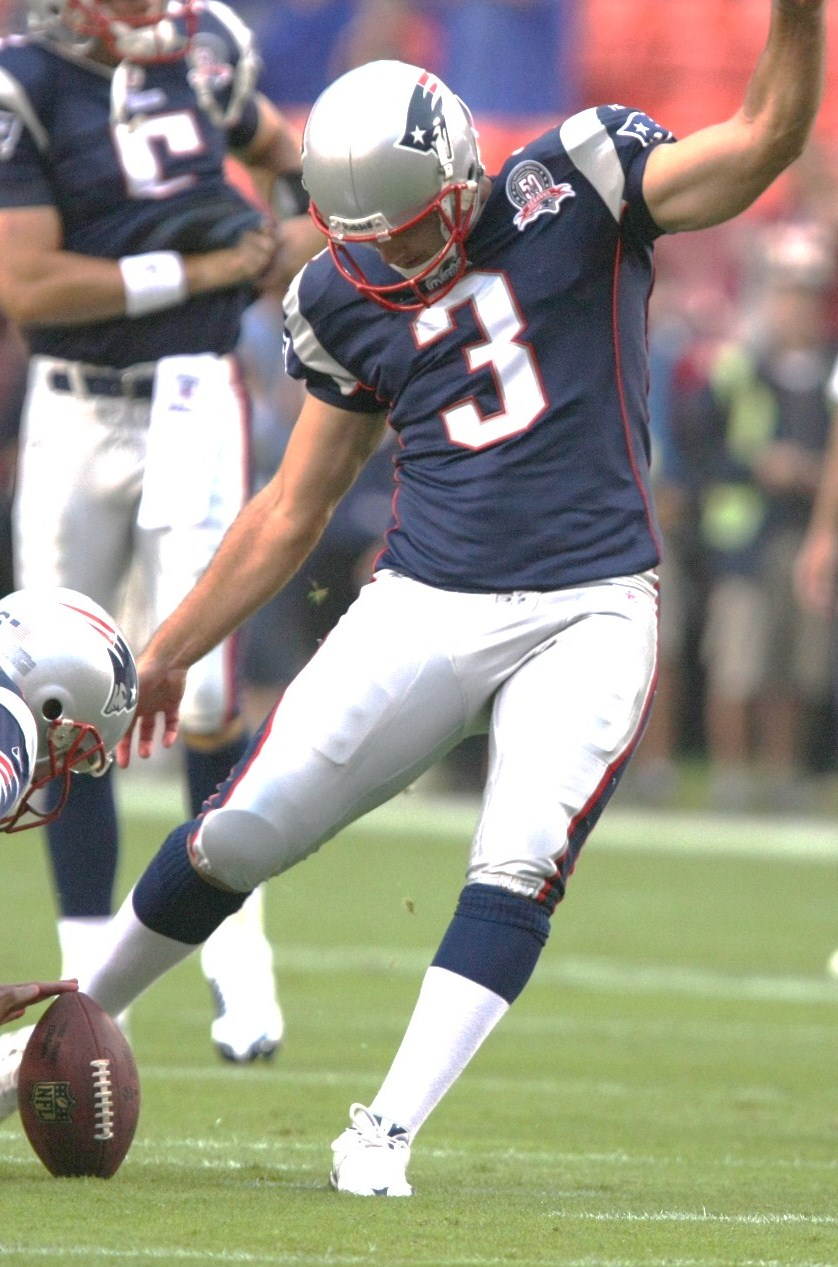
Stephen Gostkowski led the league in scoring five times with the New England Patriots, tying the record for most seasons leading the league in points. Gostkowski is also tied with Gino Cappelletti for the second longest streak of consecutive seasons leading the league (four consecutive).

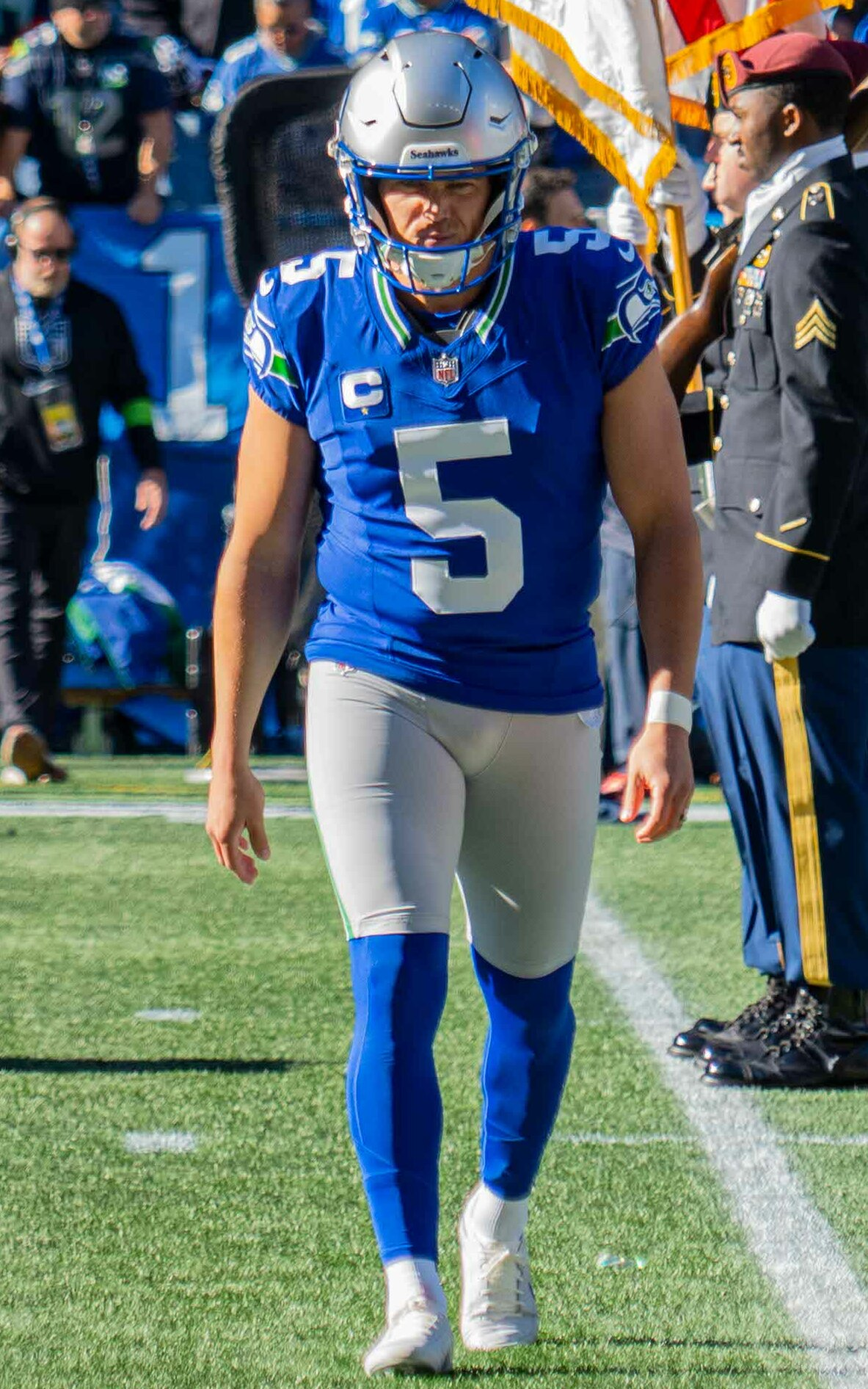
Jason Myers led the NFL in scoring in 2022 and in 2025.

Key
Symbol	Meaning
Leader	The player who recorded the most points in the NFL
Position	The player's designated position
Pts	The total number of points the player scored
GP	The number of games played by a player during the season (Note: The NFL did not have a set number of games for teams to play until the 1935 season, instead setting a minimum.)
†	Inducted into the Pro Football Hall of Fame
^	Active player
*	Set the single-season scoring record
(#)	Denotes the number of times a player appears in this list

NFL annual scoring leaders by season
Season	Leader	Position	Pts	GP	Team	Refs
1932	Dutch Clark†	Tailback	55*	11	Portsmouth Spartans	
1933	Glenn Presnell	Halfback	64*	11	Portsmouth Spartans	
1933	Ken Strong†	Fullback	64*	14	New York Giants	
1934	Jack Manders	Halfback	76*	13	Chicago Bears	
1935	Dutch Clark† (2)	Tailback	55	12	Detroit Lions	
1936	Dutch Clark† (3)	Tailback	73	12	Detroit Lions	
1937	Jack Manders (2)	Halfback	69	11	Chicago Bears	
1938	Clarke Hinkle†	Fullback	58	11	Green Bay Packers	
1939	Andy Farkas	Fullback	68	11	Washington Redskins	
1940	Don Hutson†	End	57	11	Green Bay Packers	
1941	Don Hutson† (2)	End	95*	11	Green Bay Packers	
1942	Don Hutson† (3)	End	138*	11	Green Bay Packers	
1943	Don Hutson† (4)	End	117	10	Green Bay Packers	
1944	Don Hutson† (5)	End	85	10	Green Bay Packers	
1945	Steve Van Buren†	Halfback	110	10	Philadelphia Eagles	
1946	Ted Fritsch	Fullback	100	11	Green Bay Packers	
1947	Pat Harder	Fullback	102	12	Chicago Cardinals	
1948	Pat Harder (2)	Fullback	110	12	Chicago Cardinals	
1949	Pat Harder (3)	Fullback	102	11	Chicago Cardinals	
1949	Gene Roberts	Halfback	102	12	New York Giants	
1950	Doak Walker†	Halfback	128	12	Detroit Lions	
1951	Elroy Hirsch†	End	102	12	Los Angeles Rams	
1952	Gordy Soltau	End	94	12	San Francisco 49ers	
1953	Gordy Soltau (2)	End	114	12	San Francisco 49ers	
1954	Bobby Walston	End	114	12	Philadelphia Eagles	
1955	Doak Walker† (2)	Halfback	96	12	Detroit Lions	
1956	Bobby Layne†	Quarterback	99	12	Detroit Lions	
1957	Sam Baker	Kicker	77	12	Washington Redskins	
1957	Lou Groza†	Kicker	77	12	Cleveland Browns	
1958	Jim Brown†	Fullback	108	12	Cleveland Browns	
1959	Paul Hornung†	Halfback	94	12	Green Bay Packers	
1960	Paul Hornung† (2)	Halfback	176*	12	Green Bay Packers	
1961	Paul Hornung† (3)	Halfback	146	12	Green Bay Packers	
1962	Jim Taylor†	Fullback	114	14	Green Bay Packers	
1963	Don Chandler	Kicker	106	14	New York Giants	
1964	Lenny Moore†	Halfback	120	14	Baltimore Colts	
1965	Gale Sayers†	Halfback	132	14	Chicago Bears	
1966	Bruce Gossett	Kicker	113	14	Los Angeles Rams	
1967	Jim Bakken	Kicker	117	14	St. Louis Cardinals	
1968	Leroy Kelly†	Running back	120	14	Cleveland Browns	
1969	Fred Cox	Kicker	121	14	Minnesota Vikings	
1970	Fred Cox (2)	Kicker	125	14	Minnesota Vikings	
1971	Garo Yepremian	Kicker	117	14	Miami Dolphins	
1972	Chester Marcol	Kicker	128	14	Green Bay Packers	
1973	David Ray	Kicker	130	14	Los Angeles Rams	
1974	Chester Marcol (2)	Kicker	94	14	Green Bay Packers	
1975	O. J. Simpson†	Running back	138	14	Buffalo Bills	
1976	Toni Linhart	Kicker	109	14	Baltimore Colts	
1977	Errol Mann	Kicker	99	14	Oakland Raiders	
1978	Frank Corral	Kicker	118	16	Los Angeles Rams	
1979	John Smith	Kicker	115	16	New England Patriots	
1980	John Smith (2)	Kicker	129	16	New England Patriots	
1981	Eddie Murray	Kicker	121	16	Detroit Lions	
1981	Rafael Septien	Kicker	121	16	Dallas Cowboys	
1982	Marcus Allen†	Running back	84	9	Los Angeles Raiders	
1983	Mark Moseley	Kicker	161	16	Washington Redskins	
1984	Ray Wersching	Kicker	131	16	San Francisco 49ers	
1985	Kevin Butler	Kicker	144	16	Chicago Bears	
1986	Tony Franklin	Kicker	140	16	New England Patriots	
1987	Jerry Rice†	Wide receiver	138	12	San Francisco 49ers	
1988	Scott Norwood	Kicker	129	16	Buffalo Bills	
1989	Mike Cofer	Kicker	136	16	San Francisco 49ers	
1990	Nick Lowery	Kicker	139	16	Kansas City Chiefs	
1991	Chip Lohmiller	Kicker	149	16	Washington Redskins	
1992	Pete Stoyanovich	Kicker	124	16	Miami Dolphins	
1993	Jeff Jaeger	Kicker	132	16	Los Angeles Raiders	
1994	John Carney	Kicker	135	16	San Diego Chargers	
1995	Emmitt Smith†	Running back	150	16	Dallas Cowboys	
1996	John Kasay	Kicker	145	16	Carolina Panthers	
1997	Mike Hollis	Kicker	134	16	Jacksonville Jaguars	
1998	Gary Anderson	Kicker	164	16	Minnesota Vikings	
1999	Mike Vanderjagt	Kicker	145	16	Indianapolis Colts	
2000	Marshall Faulk†	Running back	160	14	St. Louis Rams	
2001	Marshall Faulk† (2)	Running back	128	14	St. Louis Rams	
2002	Priest Holmes	Running back	144	14	Kansas City Chiefs	
2003	Jeff Wilkins	Kicker	163	16	St. Louis Rams	
2004	Adam Vinatieri†	Kicker	141	16	New England Patriots	
2005	Shaun Alexander	Running back	168	16	Seattle Seahawks	
2006	LaDainian Tomlinson†	Running back	186*	16	San Diego Chargers	
2007	Mason Crosby	Kicker	141	16	Green Bay Packers	
2008	Stephen Gostkowski	Kicker	148	16	New England Patriots	
2009	Nate Kaeding	Kicker	146	16	San Diego Chargers	
2010	David Akers	Kicker	143	16	Philadelphia Eagles	
2011	David Akers (2)	Kicker	166	16	San Francisco 49ers	
2012	Stephen Gostkowski (2)	Kicker	153	16	New England Patriots	
2013	Stephen Gostkowski (3)	Kicker	158	16	New England Patriots	
2014	Stephen Gostkowski (4)	Kicker	156	16	New England Patriots	
2015	Stephen Gostkowski (5)	Kicker	151	16	New England Patriots	
2016	Matt Bryant	Kicker	158	16	Atlanta Falcons	
2017	Greg Zuerlein	Kicker	158	14	Los Angeles Rams	
2018	Kaʻimi Fairbairn^	Kicker	150	16	Houston Texans	
2019	Harrison Butker^	Kicker	147	16	Kansas City Chiefs	
2020	Daniel Carlson^	Kicker	144	16	Las Vegas Raiders	
2020	Younghoe Koo	Kicker	144	15	Atlanta Falcons	
2020	Jason Sanders^	Kicker	144	16	Miami Dolphins	
2021	Daniel Carlson^ (2)	Kicker	150	17	Las Vegas Raiders	
2021	Nick Folk^	Kicker	150	17	New England Patriots	
2022	Jason Myers^	Kicker	143	17	Seattle Seahawks	
2023	Brandon Aubrey^	Kicker	157	17	Dallas Cowboys	
2024	Chris Boswell^	Kicker	158	17	Pittsburgh Steelers	
2025	Jason Myers^ (2)	Kicker	171	17	Seattle Seahawks	

== AFL annual scoring leaders ==
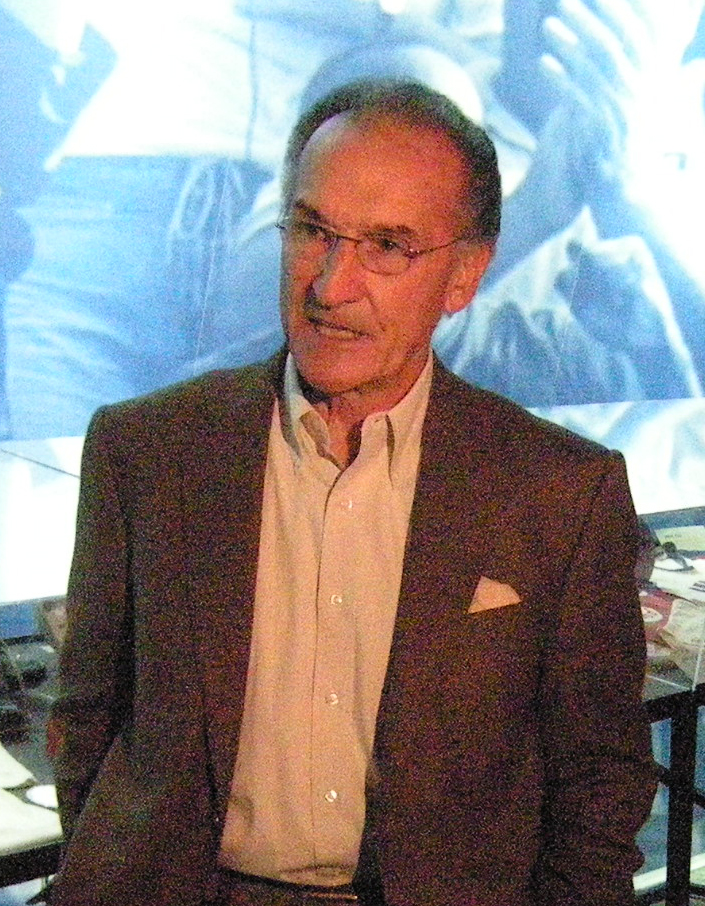
Gino Cappelletti led the AFL in scoring five times.

Key
Symbol	Meaning
Player	The player who recorded the most points in the AFL
Position	The player's designated position
Pts	The total number of points the player scored
GP	The number of games played by a player during the season
†	Pro Football Hall of Fame member
*	Player set the single-season scoring record
(#)	Denotes the number of times a player appears in this list

AFL annual scoring leaders by season
Season	Player	Position	Pts	GP	Team	Refs
1960	Gene Mingo	Halfback	123*	14	Denver Broncos	
1961	Gino Cappelletti	End	147*	14	Boston Patriots	
1962	Gene Mingo (2)	Halfback	137	14	Denver Broncos	
1963	Gino Cappelletti (2)	End	113	14	Boston Patriots	
1964	Gino Cappelletti (3)	Flanker	155*	14	Boston Patriots	
1965	Gino Cappelletti (4)	Flanker	132	14	Boston Patriots	
1966	Gino Cappelletti (5)	Flanker	119	14	Boston Patriots	
1967	George Blanda†	Quarterback	116	14	Oakland Raiders	
1968	Jim Turner	Kicker	145	14	New York Jets	
1969	Jim Turner (2)	Kicker	129	14	New York Jets	

== AAFC annual scoring leaders ==
Key
Symbol	Meaning
Player	The player who recorded the most points in the AAFC
Position	The player's designated position
Pts	The total number of points the player scored
GP	The number of games played by a player during the season
†	Pro Football Hall of Fame member
*	Player set the single-season scoring record
(#)	Denotes the number of times a player appears in this list

AAFC annual scoring leaders by season
Season	Player	Position	Pts	GP	Team	Refs
1946	Lou Groza†	Kicker	84*	14	Cleveland Browns	
1947	Spec Sanders	Tailback	114*	14	New York Yankees	
1948	Chet Mutryn	Halfback	96	14	Buffalo Bills	
1949	Alyn Beals	End	73	12	San Francisco 49ers	

== Most seasons leading the league ==
Count	Player	Seasons	Team(s)	Refs
5	Gino Cappelletti	1961, 1963–1966	Boston Patriots	
5	Stephen Gostkowski	2008, 2012–2015	New England Patriots	
5	Don Hutson	1940–1944	Green Bay Packers	
3	Dutch Clark	1932, 1935, 1936	Portsmouth Spartans (2) / Detroit Lions (1)	
3	Pat Harder	1947–1949	Chicago Cardinals	
3	Paul Hornung	1959–1961	Green Bay Packers	
2	David Akers	2010, 2011	Philadelphia Eagles (1) / San Francisco 49ers (1)	
2	Daniel Carlson	2020, 2021	Las Vegas Raiders	
2	Fred Cox	1969, 1970	Minnesota Vikings	
2	Marshall Faulk	2000, 2001	St. Louis Rams	
2	Lou Groza	1946, 1957	Cleveland Browns	
2	Jack Manders	1934, 1937	Chicago Bears	
2	Chester Marcol	1972, 1974	Green Bay Packers	
2	Gene Mingo	1960, 1962	Denver Broncos	
2	Jason Myers	2022, 2025	Seattle Seahawks	
2	John Smith	1979, 1980	New England Patriots	
2	Gordy Soltau	1952, 1953	San Francisco 49ers	
2	Jim Turner	1968, 1969	New York Jets	
2	Doak Walker	1950, 1955	Detroit Lions	

== See also ==
- List of NFL career scoring leaders
- List of NFL annual rushing touchdowns leaders
- List of NFL annual receiving touchdowns leaders
