= List of AAFC annual statistics leaders =

These are a group of lists of All-America Football Conference (AAFC) players who have led the regular season in the most important statistics each year.

For the National Football League (NFL), since April 2025 the stats are official, and count towards the official league record books.

All the following statistics are according to Pro-Football-Reference.com.

== Passing yards ==
Key
Symbol	Meaning
Player	The player who recorded the most passing yards in the AAFC
Yds	The total number of passing yards the player had
GP	The number of games played by the player during the season
†	Former AAFC record
*	Last time the record was set (current record)
(#)	Number of times a player appears in this list

AAFC annual passing yards leaders by season
Season	Player	Yds	GP	Team	Ref.
1946	Glenn Dobbs	1,886†	12	Brooklyn Dodgers	
1947	Otto Graham	2,753†	14	Cleveland Browns	
1948	Otto Graham (2)	2,713	14	Cleveland Browns	
1949	Otto Graham (3)	2,785*	12	Cleveland Browns	

== Passing touchdowns ==
Key
Symbol	Meaning
Player	The player who recorded the most passing touchdowns in the AAFC
TDs	The total number of passing touchdowns the player had
GP	The number of games played by the player during the season
†	Former AAFC record
*	Last time the record was set (current record)
(#)	Number of times a player appears in this list

AAFC annual passing touchdowns leaders by season
Season	Player	TDs	GP	Team	Ref.
1946	Otto Graham	17†	14	Cleveland Browns	
1947	Otto Graham (2)	25†	14	Cleveland Browns	
1948	Frankie Albert	29*	14	San Francisco 49ers	
1949	Frankie Albert (2)	27	12	San Francisco 49ers	

== Pass completion percentage ==
Key
Symbol	Meaning
Player	The player who recorded the most pass completion percentage in the AAFC
Comp. %	The pass completion percentage the player had
GP	The number of games played by the player during the season
†	Former AAFC record
*	Last time the record was set (current record)
(#)	Number of times a player appears in this list

AAFC annual pass completion percentage leaders by season
Season	Player	Comp. %	GP	Team	Ref.
1946	Charlie O'Rourke	57.7%	14	Los Angeles Dons	
1947	Otto Graham	60.6%*	14	Cleveland Browns	
1948	Frankie Albert	58.3%	14	San Francisco 49ers	
1949	George Ratterman	57.9%	11	Buffalo Bills	

== Passer rating ==
Key
Symbol	Meaning
Player	The player who recorded the most passer rating in the AAFC
Rate	The passer rating the player had
GP	The number of games played by the player during the season
*	Last time the record was set (current record)
(#)	Number of times a player appears in this list

AAFC annual passer rating leaders by season
Season	Player	Rate	GP	Team	Ref.
1946	Otto Graham	112.1*	14	Cleveland Browns	
1947	Otto Graham (2)	109.2	14	Cleveland Browns	
1948	Frankie Albert	102.9	14	San Francisco 49ers	
1949	Otto Graham (3)	97.5	12	Cleveland Browns	

== Rushing yards ==
Key
Symbol	Meaning
Player	The player who recorded the most rushing yards in the AAFC
Yds	The total number of rushing yards the player had
GP	The number of games played by the player during the season
†	Former AAFC record
*	Last time the record was set (current record)
(#)	Number of times a player appears in this list

AAFC annual rushing yards leaders by season
Season	Player	Yds	GP	Team	Ref.
1946	Spec Sanders	709†	13	New York Yankees	
1947	Spec Sanders (2)	1,432*	14	New York Yankees	
1948	Marion Motley	964	14	Cleveland Browns	
1949	Joe Perry	783	11	San Francisco 49ers	

== Rushing touchdowns ==
Key
Symbol	Meaning
Player(s)	The player(s) who recorded the most rushing touchdowns in the AAFC
TDs	The total number of rushing touchdowns the player(s) had
GP	The number of games played by the player(s) during the season
†	Former AAFC record
*	Last time the record was set (current record)
(#)	Number of times a player appears in this list

AAFC annual rushing touchdowns leaders by season
Season	Player(s)	TDs	GP	Team	Ref.
1946	Spec Sanders; John Kimbrough; Len Eshmont; Don Greenwood	6†	13; 14; 10; 13	New York Yankees; Los Angeles Dons; San Francisco 49ers Cleveland Browns	
1947	Spec Sanders (2)	18*	14	New York Yankees	
1948	Chet Mutryn; Joe Perry	10	14	Buffalo Bills; San Francisco 49ers	
1949	Joe Perry (2); Marion Motley	8	11	San Francisco 49ers Cleveland Browns	

== Receptions ==
Key
Symbol	Meaning
Player(s)	The player(s) who recorded the most receptions in the AAFC
RECs	The total number of receptions the player(s) had
GP	The number of games played by the player(s) during the season
†	Former AAFC record
*	Last time the record was set (current record)
(#)	Number of times a player appears in this list

AAFC annual receptions leaders by season
Season	Player	RECs	GP	Team	Ref.
1946	Alyn Beals; Dante Lavelli	40†	14	San Francisco 49ers Cleveland Browns	
1947	Mac Speedie	67*	14	Cleveland Browns	
1948	Mac Speedie (2)	58	12	Cleveland Browns	
1949	Mac Speedie (3)	62	12	Cleveland Browns	

== Receiving yards ==
Key
Symbol	Meaning
Player	The player who recorded the most receiving yards in the AAFC
Yds	The total number of receiving yards the player had
GP	The number of games played by the player during the season
†	Former AAFC record
*	Last time the record was set (current record)
(#)	Number of times a player appears in this list

AAFC annual receiving yards leaders by season
Season	Player	Yds	GP	Team	Ref.
1946	Dante Lavelli	843†	14	Cleveland Browns	
1947	Mac Speedie	1,146*	14	Cleveland Browns	
1948	Billy Hillenbrand	970	14	Baltimore Colts	
1949	Mac Speedie (2)	1,028	12	Cleveland Browns	

== Receiving touchdowns ==
Key
Symbol	Meaning
Player	The player who recorded the most receiving touchdowns in the AAFC
TDs	The total number of receiving touchdowns the player had
GP	The number of games played by the player during the season
†	Former AAFC record
*	Last time the record was set (current record)
(#)	Number of times a player appears in this list

AAFC annual receiving touchdowns leaders by season
Season	Player	TDs	GP	Team	Ref.
1946	Alyn Beals	10†	14	San Francisco 49ers	
1947	Alyn Beals (2)	10†	13	San Francisco 49ers	
1948	Alyn Beals (3)	14*	14	San Francisco 49ers	
1949	Alyn Beals (4)	12	12	San Francisco 49ers	

== Interceptions ==
Key
Symbol	Meaning
Player(s)	The player(s) who recorded the most interceptions in the AAFC
INTs	The total number of interceptions the player(s) had
GP	The number of games played by the player(s) during the season
†	Former AAFC record
*	Last time the record was set (current record)
(#)	Number of times a player appears in this list

AAFC annual interceptions leaders by season
Season	Player	INTs	GP	Team	Ref.
1946	Tommy Colella	10†	14	Cleveland Browns	
1947	Tommy Colella (2); Len Eshmont; Bill Kellagher	6	14; 13; 14	Cleveland Browns; San Francisco 49ers Chicago Rockets	
1948	Otto Schnellbacher	11*	14	New York Yankees	
1949	Jim Cason	9	12	San Francisco 49ers	

== Punting yards ==
Key
Symbol	Meaning
Player	The player who recorded the most punting yards in the AAFC
Yds	The total number of punting yards the player had
*	Last time the record was set (current record)
(#)	Number of times a player appears in this list

AAFC annual punting yards leaders by season
Season	Player	Yds	Team	Ref.
1946	Glenn Dobbs	3,826*	Brooklyn Dodgers	
1947	Ernie Lewis	2,549	Chicago Rockets	
1948	Glenn Dobbs (2)	3,336	Los Angeles Dons	
1949	Tom Landry	2,249	New York Yankees	

== Punt return yards ==
Key
Symbol	Meaning
Player	The player who recorded the most punt return yards in the AAFC
Yds	The total number of punt return yards the player had
†	Former AAFC record
*	Last time the record was set (current record)

AAFC annual punt return yards leaders by season
Season	Player	Yds	Team	Ref.
1946	Chuck Fenenbock	299†	Los Angeles Dons	
1947	Glenn Dobbs	215	Brooklyn Dodgers; Los Angeles Dons	
1948	Herman Wedemeyer	368*	Los Angeles Dons	
1949	Jim Cason	351	San Francisco 49ers	

== Kickoff return yards ==
Key
Symbol	Meaning
Player	The player who recorded the most kickoff return yards in the AAFC
Yds	The total number of kickoff return yards the player had
†	Former AAFC record
*	Last time the record was set (current record)

AAFC annual kickoff return yards leaders by season
Season	Player	Yds	Team	Ref.
1946	Chuck Fenenbock	479†	Los Angeles Dons	
1947	Chet Mutryn	691*	Buffalo Bills	
1948	Monk Gafford	559	Brooklyn Dodgers	
1949	Herman Wedemeyer	602	Baltimore Colts	

== Scoring ==
Key
Symbol	Meaning
Player	The player who recorded the most points scored in the AAFC
Pts.	The total number of points scored the player had
Pos.	The position of the player
†	Former AAFC record
*	Last time the record was set (current record)

AAFC annual scoring leaders by season
Season	Player	Pts.	Pos.	Team	Ref.
1946	Lou Groza	84†	K	Cleveland Browns	
1947	Spec Sanders	114*	HB	New York Yankees	
1948	Chet Mutryn	96	HB	Buffalo Bills	
1949	Alyn Beals	73	E	San Francisco 49ers	
