= Bill Kellagher =

American football player (1920–2003)

No. 74
- Positions: Fullback, safety

Personal information
- Born: August 13, 1920; Locust Gap, Pennsylvania, U.S.
- Died: May 11, 2003 (aged 82); DeBary, Florida, U.S.
- Listed height: 5 ft 11 in (1.80 m)
- Listed weight: 205 lb (93 kg)

Career information
- High school: Ashland (Ashland, Pennsylvania)
- College: Fordham
- NFL draft: 1946: undrafted

Career history
- Chicago Rockets (1946–1948)

Awards and highlights
- AAFC interceptions co-leader (1947)

Career AAFC statistics
- Rushing yards: 518
- Rushing average: 4.2
- Rushing touchdowns: 4
- Receptions: 5
- Receiving yards: 58
- Interceptions: 6
- Stats at Pro Football Reference

William Michael Kellagher (August 13, 1920 – May 11, 2003) was an American professional football fullback and safety who played for the Chicago Rockets of the All-America Football Conference (AAFC).

Kellagher played for the Rockets from 1946 to 1948. In 1947, along with Tommy Colella and Len Eshmont, Kellagher co-led the AAFC with 6 interceptions. Also in 1947, Kellagher ended Cleveland Browns quarterback Otto Graham's streak of 91 consecutive pass attempts without an interception, a professional football record at the time.
