= Jack Flagerman =

American football player (1922–2005)

No. 20
- Positions: Center, linebacker

Personal information
- Born: March 27, 1922; San Francisco, U.S.
- Died: June 12, 2005 (aged 83); Rohnert Park, California, U.S.
- Listed height: 6 ft 0 in (1.83 m)
- Listed weight: 218 lb (99 kg)

Career information
- High school: Tamalpais (CA)
- College: Saint Mary's (CA)

Career history
- Los Angeles Dons (1948)

Career statistics
- Games: 14
- Stats at Pro Football Reference

John Michael Flagerman (March 27, 1922 – June 12, 2005) was an American football player who played at the center and linebacker positions. He played college football for Saint Mary's (CA) and professional football for the Los Angeles Dons.

== Early life ==
Flagerman was born in 1922 in San Francisco. He attended and played football at Tamalpais High School in Mill Valley, California. While in high school, he set school records in track, basketball, and football.

== Military and college football ==
Flagerman served in the United States Marine Corps during World War II. He served in the Pacific theater of operations and fought in the Guadalcanal and Palau Islands campaigns.

After the war, he played college football for Saint Mary's (CA) in 1946 and 1947.

== Professional football ==
In 1948, he signed with the Los Angeles Dons after James Phelan was hired as the team's head coach. Phelena had also coached Flagerman at Saint Mary's. He played professional football in the All-America Football Conference for the Los Angeles Dons during their 1948 season.

== Family and later years ==
He died in 2005 at age 83 in Rohnert Park, California.
