= Nelson Greene (American football) =

American football player (1922–2004)

- Nelson Greene, 1947

No. 41
- Position: Tackle

Personal information
- Born: October 7, 1922; Shawnee, Oklahoma, U.S.
- Died: October 2, 2004 (aged 81); Shawnee, Oklahoma, U.S.
- Listed height: 6 ft 2 in (1.88 m)
- Listed weight: 235 lb (107 kg)

Career information
- High school: Shawnee (OK)
- College: Tulsa
- NFL draft: 1947: 5th round, 34th overall pick

Career history
- New York Yankees (1948); Paterson Panthers (1949)

Career NFL statistics
- Games: 14
- Stats at Pro Football Reference

Nelson Raymond Greene (October 7, 1922 – October 2, 2004) was an American professional football player who played at the tackle position on both offense and defense. He played college football for Tulsa and professional football for the New York Yankees in 1949.

== Early life ==
Greene was born in 1922 in Yukno or Shawnee, Oklahoma. He attended Shawnee High School in Oklahoma.

== College football and military service ==
Greene played college football at Tulsa in 1942, 1946, and 1947. His college career was interrupted by service in the United States Marine Corps during World War II. In his final year of college football, he accepted an invitation to play in the 1948 East-West Shrine Game in San Francisco.

== Professional football ==
He was drafted by the New York Giants in the fifth round (34th overall pick) of the 1947 NFL draft but did not play for the Giants. Instead, he played in the All-America Football Conference (AAFC) for the New York Yankees during their 1948 season, appearing in a total of 13 games. He also appeared in nine games for the Paterson Panthers in 1949.

== Later life ==
He died in 2004 in Shawnee, Oklahoma, at age 81.
