= Spec Sanders =

American football player (1919–2003)

No. 81
- Positions: Back, punter, safety

Personal information
- Born: January 26, 1919; Temple, Oklahoma, U.S.
- Died: July 6, 2003 (aged 84); Lawton, Oklahoma, U.S.
- Listed height: 6 ft 1 in (1.85 m)
- Listed weight: 196 lb (89 kg)

Career information
- High school: Temple
- College: Texas (1940-1941)
- NFL draft: 1942: 1st round, 6th overall pick

Career history
- New York Yankees (1946–1948); New York Yanks (1950)

Awards and highlights
- 2× First-team All-Pro (1946, 1947); Pro Bowl (1950); 2× AAFC rushing yards leader (1946, 1947); 2× AAFC rushing touchdowns leader (1946, (Note: co-leader in this season) 1947); AAFC scoring leader (1947); NFL interceptions leader (1950); AAFC records: Most rushing yards in a season: 1,431 (1947); Most rushing touchdowns in a season: 18 (1947); Most points scored in a season: 114 (1947)

Career AAFC/NFL statistics
- Rushing yards: 2,900
- Rushing average: 5.4
- Receiving yards: 272
- Passing yards: 2,829
- TD–INT: 23–37
- Passer rating: 52.4
- Punting yards: 7,854
- Defensive interceptions: 19
- Stats at Pro Football Reference

Orban Eugene "Spec" Sanders (January 26, 1919 – July 6, 2003) was an American professional football player who was a tailback, quarterback, and punter in the All-America Football Conference (AAFC) and a safety in the National Football League (NFL) for the New York Yanks. He was a Pro Bowler in 1950, his final season, when he led the NFL with a then-record-tying 13 interceptions. He played college football for the Texas Longhorns.

== Early life ==
Nicknamed "Spec" because of his freckles as a child, Sanders first excelled in football in high school for Temple High School in Oklahoma. His father ran a barber shop there. In 1936, he transferred to Cameron Junior College in Lawton. He still had two years of high school remaining, but at the time he was allowed to take high school courses at Cameron and play four years for the school. After four years at Cameron, he was recruited by Dana X. Bible and Blair Cherry to play at the University of Texas.

== College career ==
In 1940, Sanders saw little playing time as he was injured. The next year, he played behind Jack Crain and still managed to rack up 365 yards and score 53 points, which was good enough to catch the eye of the Washington Redskins.

== Professional career ==
Sanders had been the sixth overall pick of the 1942 NFL draft, but he had instead elected to serve in World War II. He served in the United States Navy for two years before playing football for North Carolina Pre-Flight. After the war ended, he went back to Texas to finish his degree.

Four years later, at the age of 28, he returned to football with the newly formed All-America Football Conference. Sanders would serve in a variety of positions for the New York Yankees, playing tailback, defensive back, and punter, while starting nine of 13 games. He ran 140 times for 709 yards for six touchdowns, all of which were league highs. He also caught 17 passes for 259 yards for three touchdowns. In quarterback duty, he threw 33-of-79 for 411 yards with four touchdowns to nine interceptions. He also made 33 punts for 1,208 yards while recording two interceptions on defense, one of which he returned 50 yards for a touchdown. He also returned 30 punt/kick returns for 652 yards and two combined touchdowns, one of them being a 103-yard touchdown. In total, he had 1,691 all-purpose yards with sixteen touchdowns. That year, the Yankees prevailed as the top team of the Eastern Division and won the right to play in the AAFC Championship. Facing the Cleveland Browns in Cleveland, he ran 14 times for 55 yards and one touchdown that gave the Yankees a 9–7 lead. He also returned two kicks for 52 yards while making a 45-yard punt. However, the Browns pulled away with a 14–9 win on a late Otto Graham touchdown pass.

Sanders had an even better year in 1947. He played tailback, quarterback, punter, punt/kickoff returner and defensive back. Consequently, he led the league in carries (231), yards (1,432), and touchdowns (18). He threw 93-of-171 for 1,442 yards with 14 touchdowns to 17 interceptions, he punted 46 times for 1,938 yards and he recorded three interceptions while returning 28 total punt/kicks for 757 yards with one touchdown. In total, he recorded 2,265 all-purpose yards. No player would have as many rushing touchdowns as Sanders until Jim Taylor in 1962, while Jim Brown wouldn't break his rushing yard record until 1958. His greatest game came on October 24, when he faced the Chicago Rockets. He ran 24 times for 250 yards before he was pulled from the game in the third quarter. This was a pro football record for yards that would not be touched until O. J. Simpson broke it in 1973. The Yankees returned to the AAFC Championship game again after being the top team in the Eastern Division. Sanders ran the ball 12 times for 40 yards while throwing 7-of-17 for 89 yards and one interception and returning a kick 32 yards. The Browns, like the year before however, won 14–3.

1948 was Sanders last full effective year. He played in nine starts while making appearances in four others, and he ran 169 times (a league high for the third straight year) for 759 yards with nine touchdowns. He went 78-of-168 for 918 yards with 5 touchdowns to 11 interceptions while punting 42 times for 1,707 yards. He also recorded one interception on defense while returning the ball for 345 total yards on 18 returns. Sanders suffered from knee woes and retired after the 1948 season. Despite this, he finished as the AAFC's second leading all-time rusher and all-time leader in rushing touchdowns. He was lured out of retirement to play in the NFL in 1950. Because of the knee problems, he opted to play only defense and punting that year. He responded by being named to the Pro Bowl and tying the NFL's all-time single season interception record with 13, which had been done by Dan Sandifer in 1948 with 13. Since then, only two other players have had 13 or more interceptions in a single season. He also punted 71 times for 3,001 yards. At that point, Spec Sanders decided to retire for good. Sanders also retired while ranked eleventh all-time in punting yards and ninth in punts while seventh in all-purpose yards.

He had a total of 5,376 all-purpose yards while having 2,829 passing yards in his career. In total, Sanders had scored 63 total touchdowns: 33 rushing, 23 passing, 3 receiving, two on kick return, one on a punt return, and one interception return for a touchdown. The Professional Football Researchers Association named Sanders to the PRFA Hall of Very Good Class of 2008.

Following his football career, Sanders moved back to Oklahoma and worked as a small town businessman.

=== Professional rushing statistics ===
Legend
	Led the league
**Bold**	Career high

Year	Team	League	GP	GS	Att	Yds	Avg	TD
**1946**	**New York Yankees**	**AAFC**	13	9	140	709	5.1	6
**1947**	**New York Yankees**	**AAFC**	**14**	**12**	**231**	**1,432**	**6.2**	**18**
**1948**	**New York Yankees**	**AAFC**	13	9	169	759	4.5	9

== Death ==
Sanders died in 2003 at the age of 84.
