= Johnny Naumu =

American football player (1919–1982)

- Newspaper drawing of Naumu, 1947

No. 80
- Position: Halfback

Personal information
- Born: September 30, 1919; Honolulu, Hawaii
- Died: September 23, 1982 (aged 62); Honolulu, Hawaii, U.S.
- Listed height: 5 ft 8 in (1.73 m)
- Listed weight: 175 lb (79 kg)

Career information
- High school: McKinley (HI)
- College: Hawaii, USC

Career history
- Los Angeles Dons (1948)

Career statistics
- Games: 9
- Stats at Pro Football Reference

John Punualii Naumu (September 30, 1919 – September 23, 1982) was an American football player who played at the halfback position. He played college football for Stanford and professional football for the Los Angeles Dons.

== Early life ==
Naumu was born in 1919 in Honolulu. He attended President William McKinley High School in Honolulu.

== Military and college football ==
He played college football for Hawaii from 1939 to 1941. His college career was interrupted by service in the United States Army during World War II. After the war, he rejoined the Hawaii football team in January 1945 and during the 1945 season. In 1946, he transferred to the University of Southern California. He played at the halfback position for USC in 1946 and 1947.

== Professional football ==
He played professional football in the All-America Football Conference for the Los Angeles Dons during their 1948 season. He appeared in eight games.

== Later life ==
Naumu served in the Hawaii National Guard with the rank of colonel. He was also vice president of Honolulu Federal Savings & Loan. He died in 1982 in Honolulu at age 62 after collapsing while playing racquetball.
