= Tuffy Nabors =

American football player (1924–1999)

Roland Nabors
- Roland Nabors, 1941

No. 23
- Positions: Linebacker, center

Personal information
- Born: July 22, 1924; Meadow, Texas, U.S.
- Died: December 3, 1999 (aged 75); Beaumont, Texas, U.S.
- Listed height: 6 ft 2 in (1.88 m)
- Listed weight: 200 lb (91 kg)

Career information
- High school: Lubbock (TX)
- College: Texas Tech
- NFL draft: 1947: 18th round, 157th overall pick

Career history
- New York Yankees (1948)

Career NFL statistics
- Games: 10
- Stats at Pro Football Reference

Roland Richard "Tuffy" Nabors (July 22, 1924 – December 3, 1999) was an American professional football player who played at the linebacker and center positions. He played college football for Texas Tech and professional football for the New York Yankees.

== Early life ==
Nabors was born in 1924 in Meadow, Texas. He attended Lubbock High School. He played for the Lubbock High football team in 1939, 1940, and 194, and also received varsity letters in basketball and track.

== College football and military service ==
Nabors played college football at Texas Tech in 1942, 1946, and 1947. He received numerous accolades for his college football career, including the following:

- He received an honorable mention from the Associated Press on the 1947 All-America team.
- He was selected for the All-Border Conference team.
- He was invited to play in the 1947 Blue-Gray game in Montgomery, Alabama.
- He was "named by every foe picking a team as the best center to oppose it."

He was also rated as "one of the nation's best pivot men", and "one of the greatest linemen in Texas Tech history." He also lettered in basketball at Texas Tech.

Nabors' athletic career was interrupted by service in the Army during World War II. He entered the Army in June 1943 and served in the Pacific theater of operations. He returned to the United States in July 1945.

== Professional football ==
Nabors was selected by the New York Yankees in the seventh round (55th overall pick) of the 1947 AFCA Draft. He played for the Yankees during their 1948 season. He appeared in a total of 10 AAFC games.

== Later life ==
In August 1949, he was hired as the line coach for the Texas Western Miners (later renamed UTEP) football program. Nabors served as the line coach at Texas Western for three years, ultimately resigning in January 1953 to enter private business. In June 1953, he opened the 'Tuffy' Nabors Service Station in Lubbock. He later worked for 20 years at the Texas State Comptroller's Office. He later operated a Coors beer distributorship in San Antonio.

Nabors' son, Rick Nabors, later played college football for the Texas Longhorns.

Nabors died in 1999 in Beaumont, Texas, at age 75.
