= 1948 Los Angeles Dons season =

American football team season

- Head coach: Jimmy Phelan
- Home stadium: Los Angeles Memorial Coliseum

Results
- Record: 7–7
- Division place: 3rd AAFC West
- Playoffs: Did not qualify

Program for the October 8 game against the visiting Chicago Rockets.

The 1948 Los Angeles Dons season was their third in the All-America Football Conference. The team matched their previous output of 7–7, but failed to qualify for the playoffs for the third consecutive season.

The team's statistical leaders included Glenn Dobbs with 2,403 passing yards and 539 rushing yards and Joe Aguirre with 599 receiving yards and 56 points scored.

== Season schedule ==
Game	Date	Opponent	Result	Record	Venue	Attendance	Recap
1	August 27	at **Chicago Rockets**	**W** 7–0	1–0	Soldier Field	26,479	Recap
2	September 3	at **Cleveland Browns**	**L** 14–19	1–1	Cleveland Municipal Stadium	60,193	Recap
3	September 10	Brooklyn Dodgers	**W** 17–7	2–1	L.A. Memorial Colisem	35,246	Recap
4	September 19	at **San Francisco 49ers**	**L** 14-36	2–2	Kezar Stadium	45,420	Recap
5	September 29	New York Yankees	**W** 20–10	3–2	L.A. Memorial Coliseum	35,655	Recap
6	October 8	**Chicago Rockets**	**W** 49–28	4–2	L.A. Memorial Coliseum	31,119	Recap
7	October 15	Baltimore Colts	**L** 14–29	4–3	L.A. Memorial Coliseum	40,019	Recap
8	October 24	Buffalo Bills	**L** 21–35	4–4	L.A. Memorial Coliseum	26,818	Recap
9	October 31	at Brooklyn Dodgers	**W** 17–0	5–4	Ebbets Field	12,825	Recap
10	November 7	at New York Yankees	**L** 6–38	5–5	Yankee Stadium	17,386	Recap
11	November 14	at Buffalo Bills	**W** 27–20	6–5	Civic Stadium	23,725	Recap
12	November 21	at Baltimore Colts	**W** 17–14	6–6	Municipal Stadium	25,228	Recap
13	November 25	**Cleveland Browns**	**L** 14–31	6–7	L.A. Memorial Coliseum	60,031	Recap
14	December 5	**San Francisco 49ers**	**L** 21–38	6–8	L.A. Memorial Coliseum	51,460	Recap
Note: Intra-division opponents are in **bold** text.

== Division standings ==
AAFC Western Division
	W	L	T	PCT	DIV	PF	PA	STK
Cleveland Browns	14	0	0	1.000	6–0	389	190	W14
San Francisco 49ers	12	2	0	.857	4–2	495	248	W1
Los Angeles Dons	7	7	0	.500	2–4	258	305	L2
Chicago Rockets	1	13	0	.071	0–6	202	439	L11

Note: Tie games were not officially counted in the standings.

== Roster ==
1948 Los Angeles Dons final roster
Backs: 95 Glenn Dobbs QB/RB/DB/P; 83 Jeff Durkota DB/RB; 85 Mike Graham RB/DB; 66 Walter Heap DB/RB; 77 John Kimbrough FB/LB; 68 Mickey Masini RB; 60 Bob Mitchell DB/RB; 80 Johnny Naumu RB; 65 Dick Ottele RB/DB; 88 Bill Reinhard DB/RB; 99 Herman Wedemeyer RB; Ends/Receivers: 57 Joe Aguirre; 52 Burr Baldwin; 55 Bill Fisk; 50 Len Ford; 53 Dale Gentry	Linemen/Linebackers: 42 Earl Audet T/DT; 29 John Brown C/LB; 76 Walt Clay LB/FB; 20 Jack Flagerman C/LB; 34 Ray Frankowski G/LB; 49 Clyde Johnson T/DT; 35 Butch Levy G/MG; 30 Al Lolotai MG/G; 22 Bob Nelson C/LB; 47 Mike Perrotti T/DT; 32 Knox Ramsey LB/G; 45 Bob Reinhard T/DT; 33 Hank Rockwell G/MG; 48 Bill Smith T/DT	Special teams: 3 Ben Agajanian K; Reserve: 44 Dick Danehe DT/T (IR); 75 Bob Kelly DB (IR); 97 Lin Sexton DB/RB (IR); 41 Bernie Winkler T/DT (IR); rookies in italics
