= Mike Graham (American football) =

American football player (1923–2003)

No. 85
- Positions: Fullback, halfback

Personal information
- Born: April 3, 1923; Warren, Ohio, U.S.
- Died: July 7, 2003 (aged 80); Warren, Ohio, U.S.
- Listed height: 6 ft 0 in (1.83 m)
- Listed weight: 198 lb (90 kg)

Career information
- High school: Warren G. Harding (OH)
- College: Cincinnati
- NFL draft: 1948: 9th round, 70th overall pick

Career history
- Los Angeles Dons (1948); Green Bay Packers (1949)

Career NFL statistics
- Games: 28
- Stats at Pro Football Reference

Michael Nickolas Graham Sr. (April 3, 1923 – July 7, 2003) was an American professional football player who played at the fullback and halfback positions on both offense and defense. He played college football for Cincinnati and professional football for the Los Angeles Dons.

== Early life ==
Graham was born in 1923 in Warren, Ohio. He attended and played football at Warren G. Harding High School in Warren.

== Military and college football ==
He played college football for the University of Cincinnati Bearcats in 1942, 1946, and 1947. He played at the fullback and halfback positions on offense and also on defense. He became known as the "Greek Ground Gripper" for his ability to remain on his feet while opponents tried to tackle him. His college career was interrupted by service in the United States Navy during World War II.

== Professional football ==
In January 1948, Graham announced that he would not be returning to Cincinnati for the 1948 season. He signed to play professional football with the Los Angeles Dons of the All-America Football Conference in July 1948. during their 1948 season. He also played for the Green Bay Packers in 1949 season before retiring from Professionsal Football. He also played for the Erie Vets of the American Football League in 1950.

== Family and later years ==
He died in 2003 at age 80 in Warren, Ohio.
