= Chet Mutryn =

American football player (1921–1995)

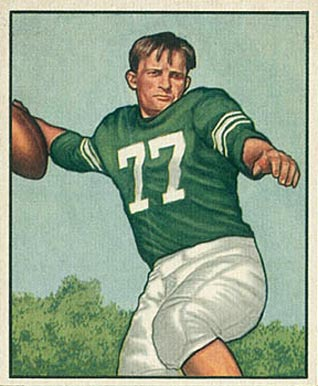
- Mutryn on a 1950 Bowman football card

No. 89, 83, 81
- Positions: Halfback; Return specialist; Defensive back

Personal information
- Born: March 12, 1921; Cleveland, Ohio, U.S.
- Died: March 24, 1995 (aged 74); Cleveland, Ohio, U.S.
- Listed height: 5 ft 9 in (1.75 m)
- Listed weight: 179 lb (81 kg)

Career information
- High school: Cathedral Latin (Chardon, Ohio)
- College: Xavier (1939-1942)
- NFL draft: 1943: 20th round, 182; Redrafted 1951, 1st round, 8th overall after termination of Colts franchise.th overall pick

Career history
- Buffalo Bisons / Bills (1946–1949); Baltimore Colts (1950)

Awards and highlights
- First-team All-Pro (1949); Second-team All-Pro (1948); AAFC rushing touchdowns co-leader (1948); AAFC kickoff return yards leader (1947); AAFC record: Most kickoff return yards in a season: 691 (1947)

Career AAFC/NFL statistics
- Rushing yards: 3,031
- Rushing average: 5.2
- Rushing touchdowns: 27
- Receptions: 121
- Receiving yards: 1,850
- Receiving touchdowns: 12
- Return yards: 2,439
- Return touchdowns: 2
- Stats at Pro Football Reference

Chester A. Mutryn (March 12, 1921 – March 24, 1995) was an American professional football halfback and return specialist who played in the All-America Football Conference (AAFC) and the National Football League (NFL). He was drafted by the Steagles in the 20th round of the 1943 NFL draft.

== Early life ==
He attended Xavier University after having exploits as quarterback for Cleveland Cathedral Latin High School (now known as Notre Dame-Cathedral Latin School). Mutryn excelled in football as well as basketball and baseball, lettering in all three sports. He played primarily as running back for Xavier while also serving as place kicker and defensive back. He led them in scoring each year while having All-Ohio honors. He was named to Xavier's Hall of Fame in 1981. He was drafted by the Philadelphia Eagles, but he served in World War II for the United States Navy.

== Professional football career ==
After going back to Xavier to graduate in 1946, he was acquired by the Buffalo Bisons of the newly formed All-America Football Conference. Mutryn would play with Buffalo for all four seasons. In 1946, he started in eight of 14 games and ran 57 times for 289 yards with one touchdown. He also served as an occasional receiver and returner, doing so with seven catches on 168 yards for three touchdowns. Mutryn returned nine total punt/kick returns for 136 yards.

Mutryn bloomed better in 1947. He played in each game of the season while running 140 times for 868 yards for nine touchdowns while catching 10 passes for 176 yards with two touchdowns. Mutryn returned 34 punts/kicks for 878 yards with one touchdown (his 691 kick return yards and touchdown led the league), doing so on an 87-yard return.

In 1948, Mutryn continued his run with further results. He ran for a career high 147 times for 823 yards with ten touchdowns. He also caught 39 passes for 794 yards and five touchdowns (with 20.4 yards per catch, a league high). He also returned a kick for a touchdown on ten returns for 171 yards, doing so on an 88-yard run; in total, he returned 29 kicks/punts for 671 yards. In total, his carries and receptions alongside his yards from scrimmage and total touchdowns all led the league. Mutryn led the AAFC in the touchdown category while being named First-team All-Pro. Buffalo had regressed to seven wins that year from eight, but it was good enough for a tie with the Baltimore Colts, necessitating a Playoff for the Eastern Division title (it would be the first of just three AAFC playoff games played that were not for the championship). Playing in Baltimore on December 12, he ran 11 times for 54 yards. A key play in the game came on something Mutryn did not end up doing. In the fourth quarter, trailing 17–14, Mutryn had apparently caught a pass from George Ratterman before fumbling the ball, which the Colts had recovered. However, it was ruled by the officials as an incomplete pass, and the Bills kept on with their drive. Later on, the Bills scored a touchdown and then added another one to prevail 28–17. In the AAFC Championship the following week, he made just eight carries for eight yards while catching two passes for five yards as the Cleveland Browns routed Buffalo 49–7.

In the last year of the AAFC, Mutryn played in eleven of the twelve games played (reduced from 14 due to the shrinking of the league to seven teams). He ran 131 times for 696 yards and five touchdowns while catching 29 passes for 333 yards to lead the league in total touches and scrimmage yards again. He also returned 17 total punt/kicks for 301 yards. His total yard count in rushes, receptions, and returns (1,330) led the league for the second time. Buffalo finished fourth in the seven-team AAFC, but it was good enough to qualify for the semifinal playoff against the top team in Cleveland. Mutryn caught two passes for touchdowns that kept Buffalo in check (they led as late as the third quarter 21–17). His eight carries for 24 yards went with six receptions for 81 yards, but Cleveland pulled away late to win 31–21.

Upon Buffalo being shut out of the league, Mutryn went to the Baltimore Colts upon their absorption into the NFL in 1950. In 12 games started, he ran 108 times for 355 yards for two touchdowns while catching 36 passes for 379 yards for two touchdowns. He returned 25 total punts/kicks for 453 yards. He was drafted by the Eagles in the first round of the 1951 NFL draft after the Baltimore Colts folded, but he never played a game with them.

When he retired in 1950, he had 7,331 all-purpose yards, which was third most in pro football history.

He was inducted into the Greater Cleveland Sports Hall of Fame in 1976.

== NFL/AAFC career statistics ==
Legend
	Led the league
**Bold**	Career high

=== Regular season ===
Year	Team	Games		Rushing					Receiving				
Year	Team	GP	GS	Att	Yds	Avg	Lng	TD	Rec	Yds	Avg	Lng	TD
1946	BUF	14	8	57	289	5.1	-	1	7	168	**24.0**	54	3
1947	BUF	14	14	140	**868**	**6.2**	50	9	10	176	17.6	58	2
1948	BUF	14	14	**147**	823	5.6	**68**	**10**	**39**	**794**	20.4	**71**	**5**
1949	BUF	11	11	131	696	5.3	-	5	29	333	11.5	-	0
1950	BCL	12	12	108	355	3.3	34	2	36	379	10.5	30	2
Career		65	59	583	3,031	5.2	68	27	121	1,850	15.3	71	12

=== Playoffs ===
Year	Team	Games		Rushing					Receiving				
Year	Team	GP	GS	Att	Yds	Avg	Lng	TD	Rec	Yds	Avg	Lng	TD
1948	BUF	2	1	**19**	**62**	**3.3**	**5**	0	2	5	2.5	**4**	0
1949	BUF	1	1	8	24	3.0	-	0	**6**	**81**	**13.5**	-	**2**
Career		3	2	27	86	3.2	5	0	8	86	10.8	4	2
