= Glenn Dobbs =

American football player, coach, and administrator (1920–2002)

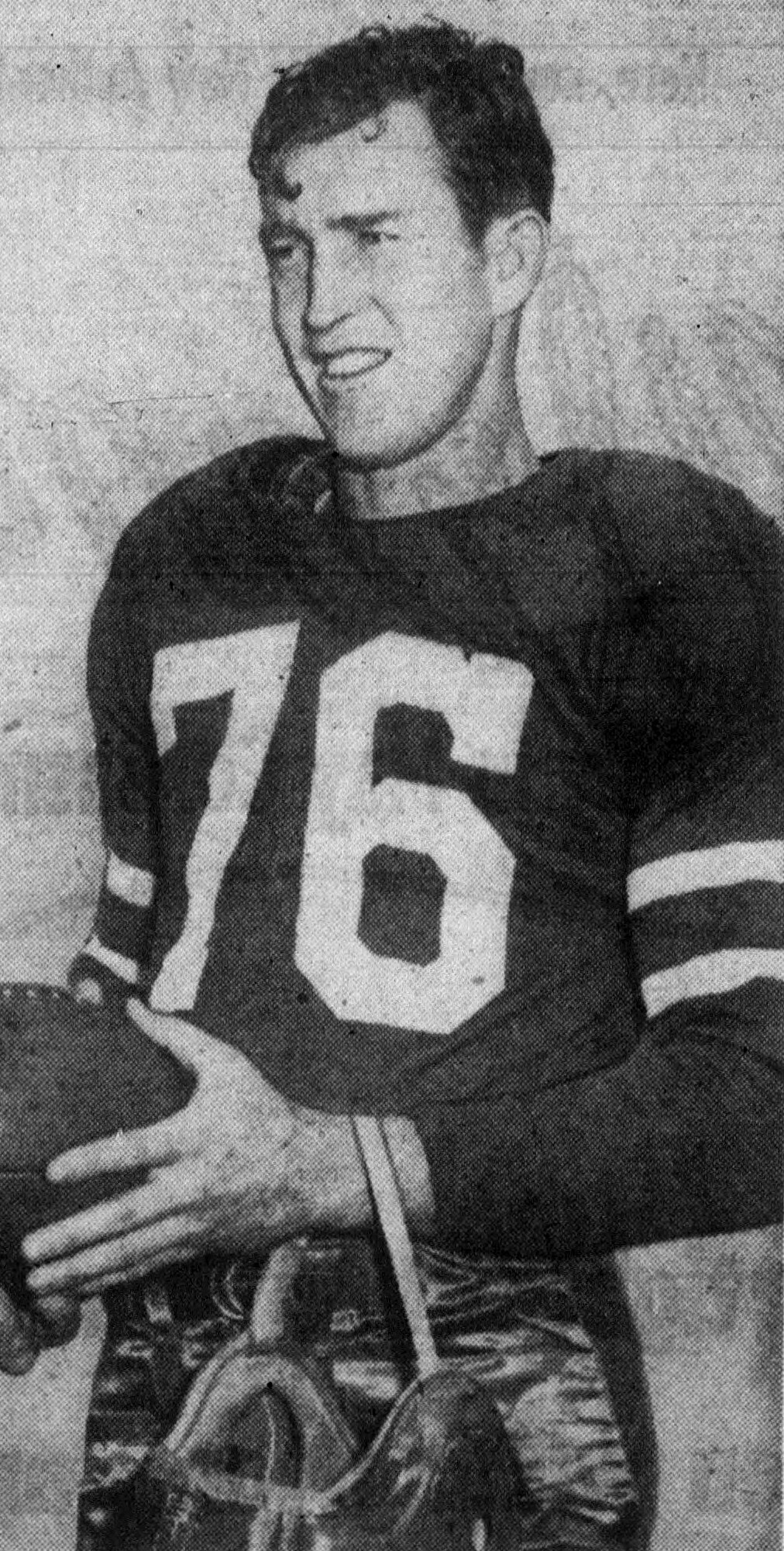

No. 90, 76, 95, 65, 45, 94
- Positions: Tailback, quarterback, punter, return specialist

Personal information
- Born: July 12, 1920; McKinney, Texas, U.S.
- Died: November 12, 2002 (aged 82); Tulsa, Oklahoma, U.S.
- Listed height: 6 ft 4 in (1.93 m)
- Listed weight: 210 lb (95 kg)

Career information
- High school: Frederick (Frederick, Oklahoma)
- College: Tulsa (1940–1942)
- NFL draft: 1943: 1st round, 3rd overall pick

Career history

Playing
- Brooklyn Dodgers (1946–1947); Los Angeles Dons (1947–1949); Saskatchewan Roughriders (1951–1953); Hamilton Tiger-Cats (1954)

Coaching
- Saskatchewan Roughriders (1951) Backfield coach; Saskatchewan Roughriders (1952) Head coach; Tulsa (1961–1968) Head coach

Operations
- Tulsa (1955–1970) Athletic director

Awards and highlights
- As a player: AAFC Most Valuable Player (1946); First-team All-Pro (1946); AAFC passing yards leader (1946); 2× AAFC punting yards leader (1946, 1948); AAFC punt return yards leader (1947); Jeff Nicklin Memorial Trophy (1951); CFL All-Star (1951); First-team All-American (1942); Tulsa Golden Hurricane Jersey No. 45 retired; AAFC record: Most punting yards in a season: 3,826 (1946)

Career AAFC statistics
- TD–INT: 45–52
- Passing yards: 5,876
- Passer rating: 61
- Rushing yards: 1,039
- Rushing touchdowns: 12
- Punting yards: 10,721
- Punting average: 46.4
- Return yards: 732
- Stats at Pro Football Reference

Head coaching record
- Career: 45–37 (.549)
- College Football Hall of Fame

Glenn Dobbs Jr. (July 12, 1920 – November 12, 2002) was an American professional football player in the All-America Football Conference (AAFC). A skilled tailback, quarterback, punter and return specialist, Dobbs was named the AAFC's MVP in 1946. After sitting out the 1950 season with a knee injury, Dobbs was persuaded to come out of retirement to play with the Saskatchewan Roughriders of the Western Interprovincial Football Union (WIFU), forerunner of the Canadian Football League (CFL). In 1951 Dobbs was named the Most Valuable Player of the WIFU. Dobbs played college football at the University of Tulsa, where he was later head football coach from 1961 to 1968 and athletic director from 1955 to 1970. He was inducted into the College Football Hall of Fame as a player in 1980.

== Early life ==
Dobbs was born July 12, 1920. in McKinney, Texas. He was a successful running back and punter in high school, earning all-state honors while playing for his school in Frederick, Oklahoma.

== Collegiate career ==
Following graduation Dobbs enrolled at the private University of Tulsa, where he played varsity college football in the 1940, 1941, and 1942 seasons. A pass-throwing halfback, Dobbs was the hero of the 7th Annual Sun Bowl game, played New Year's Day 1942, completing 20 of his 30 short passes for 201 yards. Dobbs also rushed proficiently and blasted an 85-yard punt in the game, leading a 60-yard drive in the 4th quarter for a 6-0 Tulsa victory over Texas Tech.

During his Senior year (1942), Dobbs led the Golden Hurricane to an undefeated 10–0 record. In addition to his running and passing skills, Dobbs was the nation's top collegiate punter in the 1942 season, with a 48.3 yards per punt average, One of Dobbs' punts from his own goal line against University of Oklahoma, traveled nearly 100 yards, pinning the Sooners deep on their own end of the field. Dobbs was named the first All-American in Tulsa football history for his efforts in the successful 1942 season. The No. 4 ranked Golden Hurricane advanced that year to play in the Sugar Bowl, where they fell to Tennessee by a score of 14–7.

At the time of his death, Dobbs was still regarded by many as the greatest football player in University of Tulsa history. He continues to hold the mark for four of the five longest punts in school history, including boots of 87, 79, 78, and 77 yards.

== Military football career ==
Dobbs was selected as the third pick of the National Football League draft by the Chicago Cardinals. He was unable to come to contract terms with the team, however, and instead enlisted in the U.S. Army Air Forces. During the years of World War II the American military maintained service football teams as part of its program to entertain the troops and the star runner and punter Dobbs was stationed at Randolph Air Force Base near San Antonio, Texas and played for the base team, the Randolph Field Ramblers, leading the squad to a 9–1 record. Dobbs and the Ramblers play in the 1944 Cotton Bowl Classic, battling the Texas Longhorns to a 7–7 tie.

In 1944 Dobbs was transferred to the 1944 Second Air Force Superbombers. The Superbombers fell to Dobbs's former team, the undefeated Randolph Field Ramblers the Treasury Bond Bowl, held on December 16 1944 before a crowd of thousands in the Polo Grounds in New York City. Also in 1944, Dobbs played for a team of collegiate and military team all-stars which very nearly upset the NFL Champion Chicago Bears in an exhibition game.

== Professional football career ==
Following the conclusion of his military career, Dobbs signed with the Brooklyn Dodgers of the All-America Football Conference (AAFC), a short-lived rival of the NFL. He led them to a win in the first game in franchise history against the Buffalo Bisons on September 8, as Lew Mayne and Dobbs each threw a touchdown pass in a 27–14 win. Dobbs started 11 of the 12 games for the Dodgers, with Mayne and others having minimal time. He also served as punter and kick/punt returner for the team. However, the Dodgers did not win again for an entire month and won just two more games the whole season to finish 3–10–1. Dobbs and left tackle Martin Ruby were the shining lights for the team (each were named All-Pro), with Dobbs leading the league in passes completed (135) and attempted (269), passing yards (1,886), interceptions (15) alongside punts (80) and punting yards (3,826).

In 1947, Dobbs spent the first two games with Brooklyn, going 12-of-34 with a touchdown and an interception before he was traded to the Los Angeles Dons. He started three games while making appearances in six other games while doing 44 combined punts for 1,909 yards. He threw seven total touchdowns to eight interceptions. He led in just one category: punt returns, having made 19 of them. In 1948, he played ten of the 14 games for the Dons. He led the league in completions/attempts (185-of-369) while throwing 2,403 yards for 21 touchdowns to 20 interceptions alongside running 91 times for 539 yards for four touchdowns while punting a league-high 68 times for 3,336 yards. For his efforts, he was named 2nd-team All-Pro.

1949 was the last season of the AAFC and the last one played for Dobbs in American football. He started six of twelve games and threw 65-of-153 for four touchdowns to nine interceptions while punting 39 times for 1,650 yards. At the time of his departure from football, Dobbs was one of only four players to have punted for 10,000 yards, with Sammy Baugh, Bob Waterfield, and Roy Zimmerman (all of whom were also quarterbacks used for punting) ahead of him; since 1950, over a hundred players have punted for 10,000 yards.

=== Canada ===
Dobbs joined Canada's pro football Saskatchewan Roughriders in 1951, leading his team to the Grey Cup game, and was named Most Valuable Player in the Canadian Western League that season. He became their player-coach in 1952, but his playing career was hampered by a knee injury.

He was a popular figure in Saskatchewan during his brief time there. Following his first season in Regina, a local store sold "Dobber shirts" and "Dobber jeans" and many cars sported unofficial license plates which said "DOBBERVILLE."

CFL statistics			Passing						Rushing			
Year	Team	GP	Att	Com	%	Yds	TD	Int	#	Yds	Ave.	TD
1951	Saskatchewan Roughriders	14	274	145	52.9	2313	28	12	38	94	2.5	7
1952	Saskatchewan Roughriders	12	253	116	45.8	1977	14	12	35	70	2	0
1953	Saskatchewan Roughriders	9	128	67	52.3	906	9	7	16	77	4.8	0
1954	Hamilton Tiger Cats	1	2	0	0	0	0	0	0	0	0	0
Career		36	657	328	49.9	5196	51	31	89	241	2.7	7

== Coaching career ==
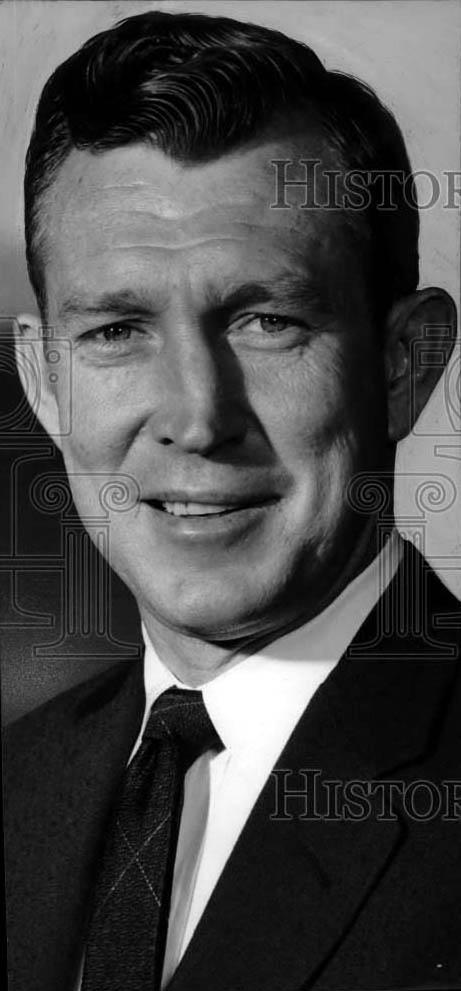
Dobbs, c. 1960s

After his professional career ended, Dobbs became the athletic director at Tulsa in 1955 and held that position until 1970. Dobbs was also head football coach from 1961 to 1968. His teams led the nation in passing for five straight years (1962–1966) and went to the Bluebonnet Bowl in 1964 and 1965.

From 1977 to 1979, Dobbs was President of the Tulsa Drillers minor league baseball team. He was a coach and owner of the minor league football team Tulsa Mustangs in 1979 but the team folded after playing only 4 games.

== Legacy and death ==
Dobbs was elected into the Oklahoma Sports Hall of Fame in 1988. His brother Bobby Dobbs was also a football player and coach, and preceded Glenn as Tulsa's coach. Dobbs died of cancer November 12, 2002 in Tulsa, Oklahoma at the age of 82.

== Head coaching record ==
=== College ===
Year	Team	Overall	Conference	Standing	Bowl/playoffs	Coaches^{#}
Tulsa Golden Hurricane (Missouri Valley Conference) (1961–1968)
1961	Tulsa	2–8	1–2	T–2nd		
1962	Tulsa	5–5	3–0	1st		
1963	Tulsa	5–5	2–2	T–3rd		
1964	Tulsa	9–2	3–1	2nd	W Bluebonnet	18
1965	Tulsa	8–3	4–0	1st	L Bluebonnet	16
1966	Tulsa	6–4	3–1	T–1st		
1967	Tulsa	7–3	3–1	2nd		
1968	Tulsa	3–7	2–3	T–4th		
Tulsa:		45–37	21–10			
Total:		45–37				
National championship Conference title Conference division title or championship game berth
^{#}Rankings from final Coaches Poll.
