= Dan Sandifer =

American football player (1927–1987)

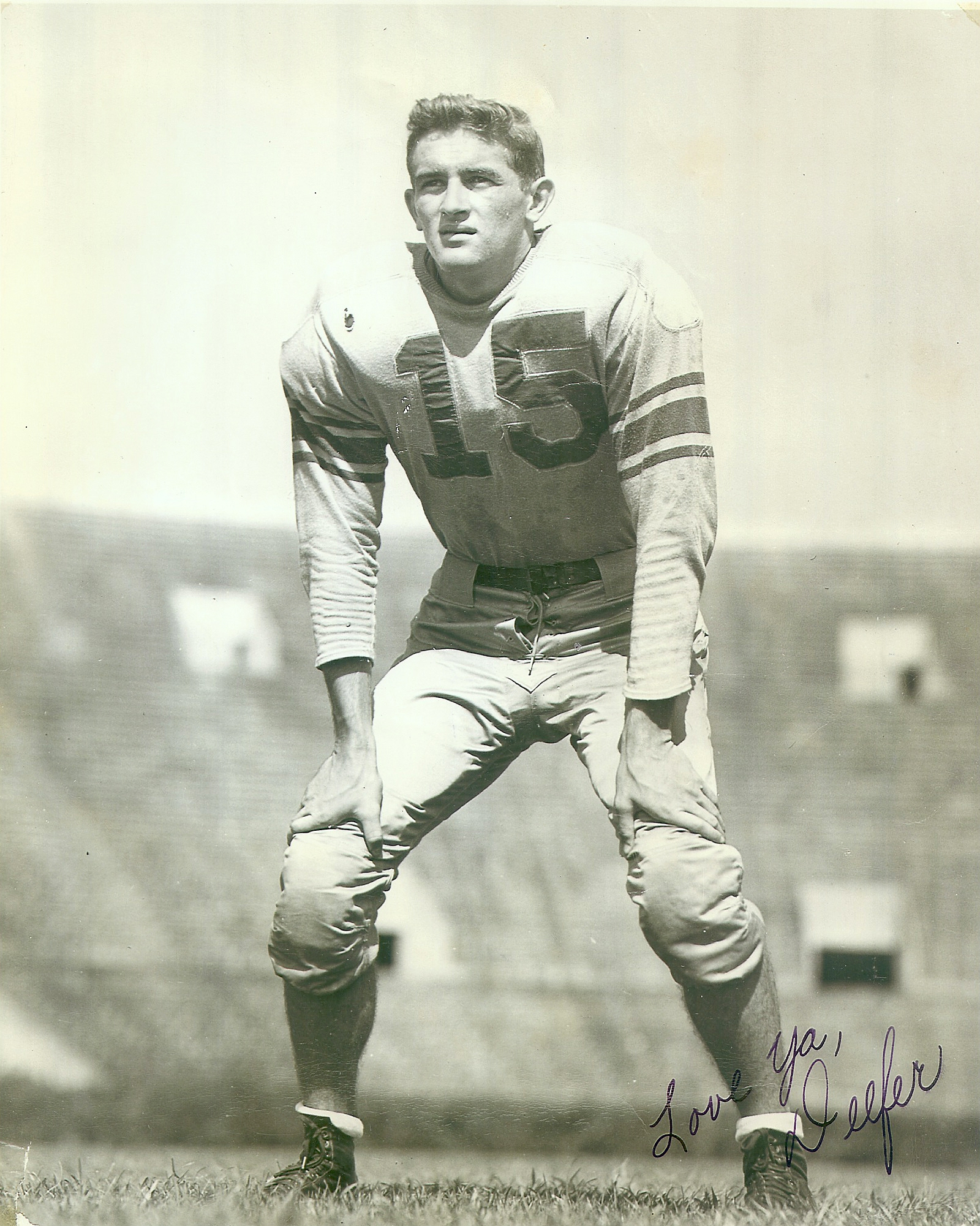

No. 20, 12, 81, 31, 21, 23
- Positions: Defensive back, halfback, return specialist

Personal information
- Born: March 1, 1927; Shreveport, Louisiana, U.S.
- Died: August 15, 1987 (aged 60); Shreveport, Louisiana, U.S.
- Listed height: 6 ft 1 in (1.85 m)
- Listed weight: 190 lb (86 kg)

Career information
- High school: C.E. Byrd (Shreveport)
- College: LSU
- NFL draft: 1948: 3rd round, 28th overall pick

Career history
- Washington Redskins (1948–1949); San Francisco 49ers (1950); Detroit Lions (1950); Philadelphia Eagles (1950–1951); Green Bay Packers (1952–1953); Chicago Cardinals (1953)

Awards and highlights
- NFL interceptions leader (1948); NFL kickoff return yards leader (1948); NFL records: Most interceptions in a game: 4 (tied); Most interceptions returned for a touchdown in a game: 2 (tied)

Career NFL statistics
- Interceptions: 23
- Fumble recoveries: 8
- Total touchdowns: 9
- Stats at Pro Football Reference

Daniel Padgett Sandifer (March 1, 1927 – August 15, 1987) was an American professional football player who was a defensive back, halfback, receiver, and kick returner for six teams in the National Football League (NFL) from 1948 to 1953. He played college football for the LSU Tigers. Because of World War II, he was one of the few college players to play in two College All-Star Games. He currently holds the Washington Redskins team record for most interceptions in a season (13) set in his rookie year, 1948. 13 interceptions in a season has been surpassed only once in NFL history by Dick "Night Train" Lane with 14 in 1952 playing for the Los Angeles Rams. Dan recorded 4 interceptions and 2 pick 6s in a single NFL game in 1948. Sandifer also had interceptions in six consecutive games during his rookie year in 1948.

== Career ==
Sandifer was drafted by the Washington Redskins in the third round of the 1948 NFL draft out of Louisiana State. That same season he led the NFL with a then record 13 interceptions. Dick "Night Train" Lane's 14 interceptions in a season is the only time Sandifer's record was surpassed in NFL history. Sandifer's 13 interceptions remains the All-Time single season interception record for the Washington Redskins. He also is included in a group of NFL players who hold the record for most interceptions in a game, intercepting four passes against the Boston Yanks on Halloween 1948, returning two of them for touchdowns, a record that has never been broken. Sandifer also spent time on the offense during his career. He had 74 career carries for 247 yards and one touchdown, with his first two seasons with the Redskins and his 1951 season with the Eagles being where he had most of his use. He also had 30 receptions for 510 yards and 5 touchdowns. He also returned 72 punts for 767 yards (with a 10.7 yards per return). He finished in the top 10 of punt returns in the league three times, finishing 3rd in 1948 (20), 6th in 1949 (18), and 9th in 1950 (15). He also had 63 kickoffs for 1,367 yards (with a 21.7 yards per return) and one touchdown. He was first in kick return yards and kick returns in 1948 along with 1st in kick returns in 1949 and 2nd in kickoff returns. He also finished in the top 5 of all-purpose yards, finishing 3rd in 1948 with 1,340 and 4th the next year with 1,161. He had 23 career interceptions, with 13 being in his rookie season.

== After football ==
Sandifer was an architect and a ranked amateur tennis player after his NFL days. He was one of the architects of the Louisiana State University Student Union Building in Baton Rouge, Louisiana. He died of heart disease on August 15, 1987.
