= Alyn Beals =

American football player (1921–1993)

- Beals in 1949

No. 53
- Position: End

Personal information
- Born: April 27, 1921; Marysville, California, U.S.
- Died: August 11, 1993 (aged 72); Redwood City, California, U.S.
- Listed height: 6 ft 0 in (1.83 m)
- Listed weight: 188 lb (85 kg)

Career information
- High school: San Francisco Polytechnic (San Francisco, California)
- College: Santa Clara (1939–1942)
- NFL draft: 1943: 8th round, 69th overall pick

Career history
- San Francisco 49ers (1946–1951)

Awards and highlights
- 3× First-team All-Pro (1946, 1948, 1949); AAFC receptions co-leader (1946); 4× AAFC receiving touchdowns leader (1946–1949); AAFC scoring leader (1949); Third-team All-American (1941); First-team All-PCC (1942); Second-team All-PCC (1941); AAFC record: Most receiving touchdowns in a season: 14 (1948)

Career AAFC + NFL statistics
- Receptions: 211
- Receiving yards: 2,951
- Receiving touchdowns: 49
- Stats at Pro Football Reference

Alyn Richard Beals (April 27, 1921 – August 11, 1993) was an American professional football end who played six seasons for the San Francisco 49ers in the All-America Football Conference (AAFC) and the National Football League (NFL).

Originally drafted by the Chicago Bears in the 1942 NFL draft, Beals instead volunteered and served in the United States military, only resuming his professional football career in 1946. Signing with the 49ers of the upstart AAFC, Beals emerged as one of the top stars of the league, being named an AAFC All-Pro for three of the league's four years of existence and finishing the final 1949 season as the league's all-time scoring leader, with 278 points scored. Beals scored 10 touchdowns or more in each season the 49ers were part of the AAFC.

== Biography ==
=== Early life ===
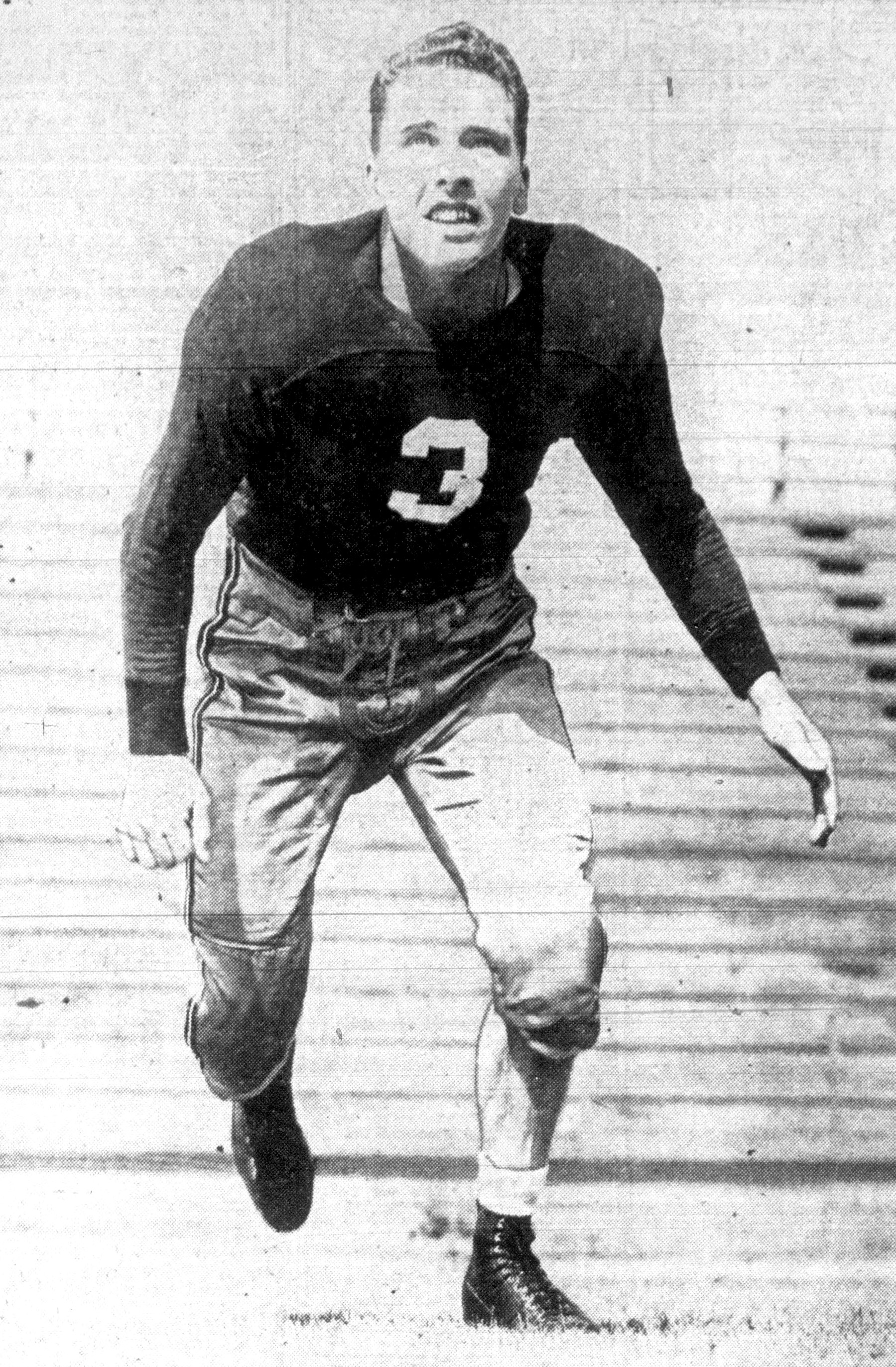
Alyn Beals circa 1942.

Alyn Beals grew up in San Francisco, California and was raised by his mother, who divorced his father when Beals was three years old. He excelled at San Francisco Polytechnic High School in football (right near Kezar Stadium, which led to a scholarship from Santa Clara University after he picked them over the University of California.

Beals was selected in the eighth round by the Chicago Bears in the 1942 NFL draft, but he elected to serve in World War II instead, where he later became a Field Artillery Battery Commander. Beals scored 46 touchdowns in four seasons with the team (1939 to 1943) and he was inducted into the university's Hall of Fame in 1964.

=== Pro football career ===
Beals was given a letter by the Chicago Bears to gauge his interest in playing for them in his senior season in 1942, but he served in World War II instead. He did ROTC at Santa Clara, and later served as a Field Artillery Battery Commander, seeing action at Battle of the Bulge and also serving as security during the Nuremberg trials.

When the war ended, he was recruited to play for the newly formed San Francisco 49ers of the All-America Football Conference (AAFC) and play for Buck Shaw, his former coach at Santa Clara, bolstered by a $4,500 contract that dwarfed his $275 a month when in the Army. Beals led the AAFC in receiving touchdowns all four years of the league's existence and in 1949 he was the AAFC leader in overall touchdowns (12) and points scored (73).

Beals' career-best 14 receiving touchdowns in 1948 would stand as a team record for nearly four decades. When the AAFC folded at the end of the 1949 season, he was the league's all-time scoring leader with 278 points.

When Beals retired with 49 touchdowns as a receiver, he was 3rd all-time in pro football history. His 211 receptions were sixth all-time at the time of retirement. The dawn of a heightened passing game in the half century since his retirement has meant that he ranks in the top 140 in touchdowns as of 2026.

=== Death and legacy ===
Beals died in his sleep on August 11, 1993, at his home in Redwood City, California. He was 72 years old at the time of his death.

Beals was remembered as one of the biggest stars of the All-America Football Conference that was named a three time All-Pro AAFC player and holder of the league's all-time career scoring records with 278 points, including 46 touchdowns and 2 extra points. Despite playing just four years in the 1940s, Beals and his 46 receiving touchdowns was third most for all receivers for the entire decade and for his entire career of 1946 to 1951, no player had more receiving touchdowns than him.

== NFL/AAFC career statistics ==
Legend
	Led the league
**Bold**	Career high

=== Regular season ===
Year	Team	Games		Receiving			
Year	Team	GP	GS	Rec	Yds	Avg	TD
1946	SFO	14	1	40	586	14.7	10
1947	SFO	13	9	**47**	655	13.9	10
1948	SFO	14	13	46	591	12.8	**14**
1949	SFO	12	8	44	**678**	**15.4**	12
1950	SFO	12	12	22	315	14.3	3
1951	SFO	12	5	12	126	10.5	0
Career		77	48	211	2,951	14.0	49

=== Playoffs ===
Year	Team	Games		Receiving			
Year	Team	GP	GS	Rec	Yds	Avg	TD
1949	SFO	2	2	4	32	8.0	0
Career		2	2	4	32	8.0	0
