= 1948 New York Yankees (AAFC) season =

American football team season

- Owner: Dan Topping
- Head coach: Ray Flaherty and Red Strader
- Home stadium: Yankee Stadium

Results
- Record: 6–8
- Division place: 3rd AAFC East
- Playoffs: Did not qualify

The 1948 New York Yankees season was their third in the All-America Football Conference. The team failed to improve on their previous output of 11-2-1, winning only six games. For the first time in three seasons, and the only time in franchise history, they did not qualify for the playoffs.

The team's statistical leaders included Spec Sanders with 918 passing yards, 759 rushing yards, and 58 points scored, and Bruce Alford with 578 receiving yards and 42 points scored.

== Season schedule ==
Week	Date	Opponent	Result	Record	Venue	Recap
1	August 27	at **Brooklyn Dodgers**	**W** 21–3	1–0	Ebbets Field	Recap
2	September 5	at **Baltimore Colts**	**L** 28–45	1–1	Municipal Stadium	Recap
3	September 12	at San Francisco 49ers	**L** 0–41	1–2	Kezar Stadium	Recap
4	September 16	**Baltimore Colts**	**L** 14–27	1–3	Yankee Stadium	Recap
5	September 29	at Los Angeles Dons	**L** 10–20	1–4	Los Angeles Memorial Coliseum	Recap
6	Bye					
7	October 10	at **Buffalo Bills**	**W** 14–13	2–4	Civic Stadium	Recap
8	October 17	San Francisco 49ers	**L** 7–21	2–5	Yankee Stadium	Recap
9	October 24	at Cleveland Browns	**L** 7–35	2–6	Cleveland Municipal Stadium	Recap
10	October 31	Chicago Rockets	**W** 42–7	3–6	Yankee Stadium	Recap
11	November 7	Los Angeles Dons	**W** 38–6	4–6	Yankee Stadium	Recap
12	November 14	**Brooklyn Dodgers**	**W** 21–7	5–6	Yankee Stadium	Recap
13	November 21	Cleveland Browns	**L** 21–34	5–7	Yankee Stadium	Recap
14	November 28	**Buffalo Bills**	**L** 14–35	5–8	Yankee Stadium	Recap
15	December 5	at Chicago Rockets	**W** 28–7	6–8	Soldier Field	Recap
Note: Intra-division opponents are in **bold** text.

== Division standings ==
AAFC Eastern Division
	W	L	T	PCT	DIV	PF	PA	STK
Buffalo Bills	7	7	0	.500	4–2	360	358	L1
Baltimore Colts	7	7	0	.500	5–1	333	327	W2
New York Yankees	6	8	0	.429	3–3	265	301	W1
Brooklyn Dodgers	2	12	0	.143	0–6	253	387	L6

Note: Tie games were not officially counted in the standings.

== Roster ==
1948 New York Yankees final roster
Backs: 85 Tom Casey RB; 60 Lloyd Cheatham FB; 66 Duke Iversen FB/S; 70 Bob Kennedy FB/LB; 84 Pete Layden RB/CB/P; 62 Joe Magliolo S; 90 Harmon Rowe S; 81 Spec Sanders RB/S/P; 88 Bud Schwenk RB; 80 Bob Sweiger RB/LB; 83 Lowell Tew RB; 87 Lowell Wagner CB/RB; 76 Buddy Young FB/CB	Linemen/Linebackers: 43 Bill Chambers G/T/DG/DT; 38 Denny Crawford G/DG; 33 Mike Garzoni G/DG; 41 Nelson Greene T/DT; 45 Glenn Johnson T/DT; 75 Harvey Johnson LB/K; 46 Paul Mitchell T/DT; 23 Tuffy Nabors LB/C; 40 Derrell Palmer T/DT; 20 Frank Perantoni C; 35 Charley Riffle G/DG; 30 Ed Sharkey G/DG; 31 Joe Signaigo DG/G; 32 Marion Shirley G/DG; 25 Lou Sossamon LB/C; 44 Arnie Weinmeister T/DT	Ends/Receivers: 51 Bruce Alford; 57 Paul Cleary; 55 Van Davis; 58 John Rokisky; 53 Jack Russell; 56 Otto Schnellbacher CB; rookies in italics
