= Len Eshmont =

American football player and coach (1917–1957)

- Eshmont in 1949

No. 2, 81
- Positions: Halfback, Safety

Personal information
- Born: August 26, 1917; Mount Carmel, Pennsylvania, U.S.
- Died: May 12, 1957 (aged 39); Charlottesville, Virginia, U.S.
- Listed height: 5 ft 11 in (1.80 m)
- Listed weight: 179 lb (81 kg)

Career information
- High school: Mount Carmel
- College: Fordham (1937–1940)
- NFL draft: 1941: 5th round, 36th overall pick

Career history
- New York Giants (1941); San Francisco 49ers (1946–1949)

Awards and highlights
- AAFC rushing touchdowns co-leader (1946); AAFC interceptions co-leader (1947)

Career AAFC/NFL statistics
- Rushing yards: 1,345
- Rushing average: 4.8
- Rushing touchdowns: 7
- Receptions: 54
- Receiving yards: 915
- Receiving touchdowns: 6
- Interceptions: 10
- Military career
- Allegiance: United States
- Branch: United States Navy
- Service years: 1942–1945
- Rank: Lieutenant
- Conflicts: World War II
- Stats at Pro Football Reference

Leonard Charles Eshmont (August 26, 1917 – May 12, 1957) was an American professional football player who was a halfback and safety for the New York Giants of the National Football League (NFL) and the San Francisco 49ers, then in the All-America Football Conference (AAFC). He played college football for the Fordham Rams.

== Early life and college ==
Len Eshmont hailed from Atlas, Pennsylvania, a small town near Mount Carmel.

He played college football at Fordham University in The Bronx; as a senior in 1940, he led the Rams to a 7–1 regular season record and a berth in the Cotton Bowl, which they lost by a point to sixth-ranked Texas A&M.

== Professional career ==
Eshmont was selected by the New York Giants in fifth round of the 1941 NFL draft, 36th overall. He served in the U.S. Navy during World War II and then played for the 49ers from 1946 to 1949, and scored the first touchdown in franchise history, doing so on a 40-yard pass from Frankie Albert on September 8, 1946.

== Coaching career ==
After his playing career ended, Eshmont was an assistant coach at the U.S. Naval Academy under Eddie Erdelatz. He moved to the University of Virginia in 1956 under new head coach Ben Martin, whom he had coached with at Navy.

== Death and legacy ==
Eshmont died at age 39 in 1957 of infectious hepatitis at the University Hospital in Charlottesville, Virginia, where he had been a patient for his final three months.

The 49ers created The Len Eshmont Award, the team's most prestigious annual honor, which is given to the Niner who best exemplifies the "inspirational and courageous play" of Eshmont.

== See also ==
- List of NCAA major college football yearly rushing leaders
