= List of College of William & Mary alumni =

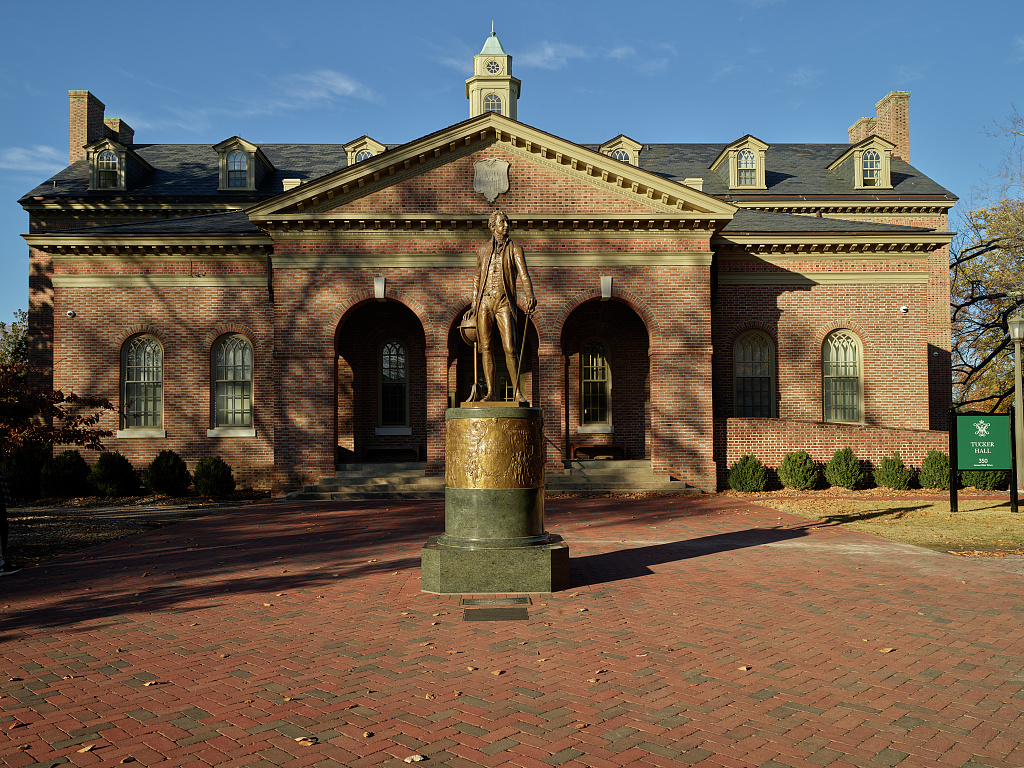
A statue of James Monroe, the United States' fifth president, stands before Tucker Hall at the College of William & Mary in Williamsburg, Virginia

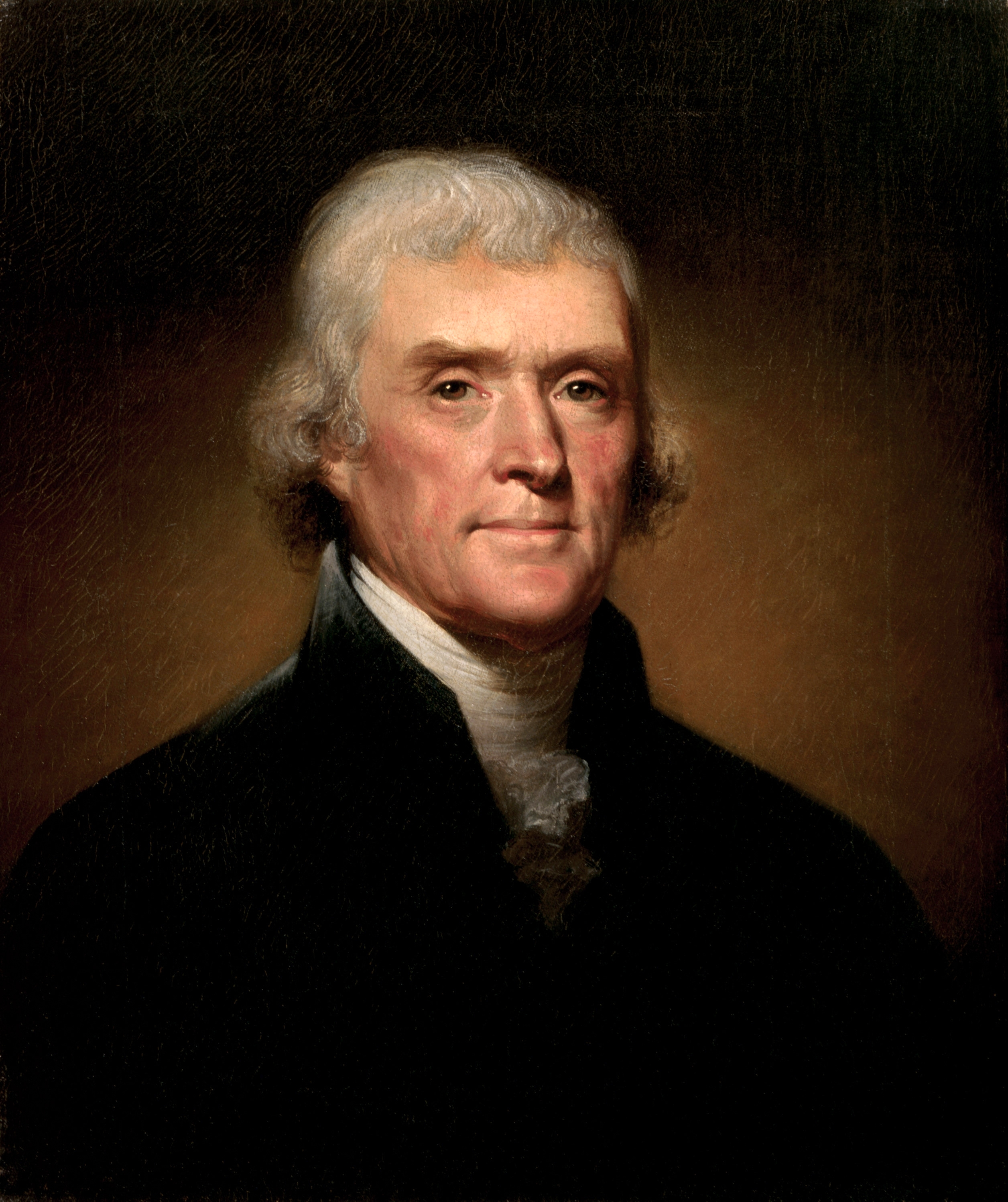
Thomas Jefferson

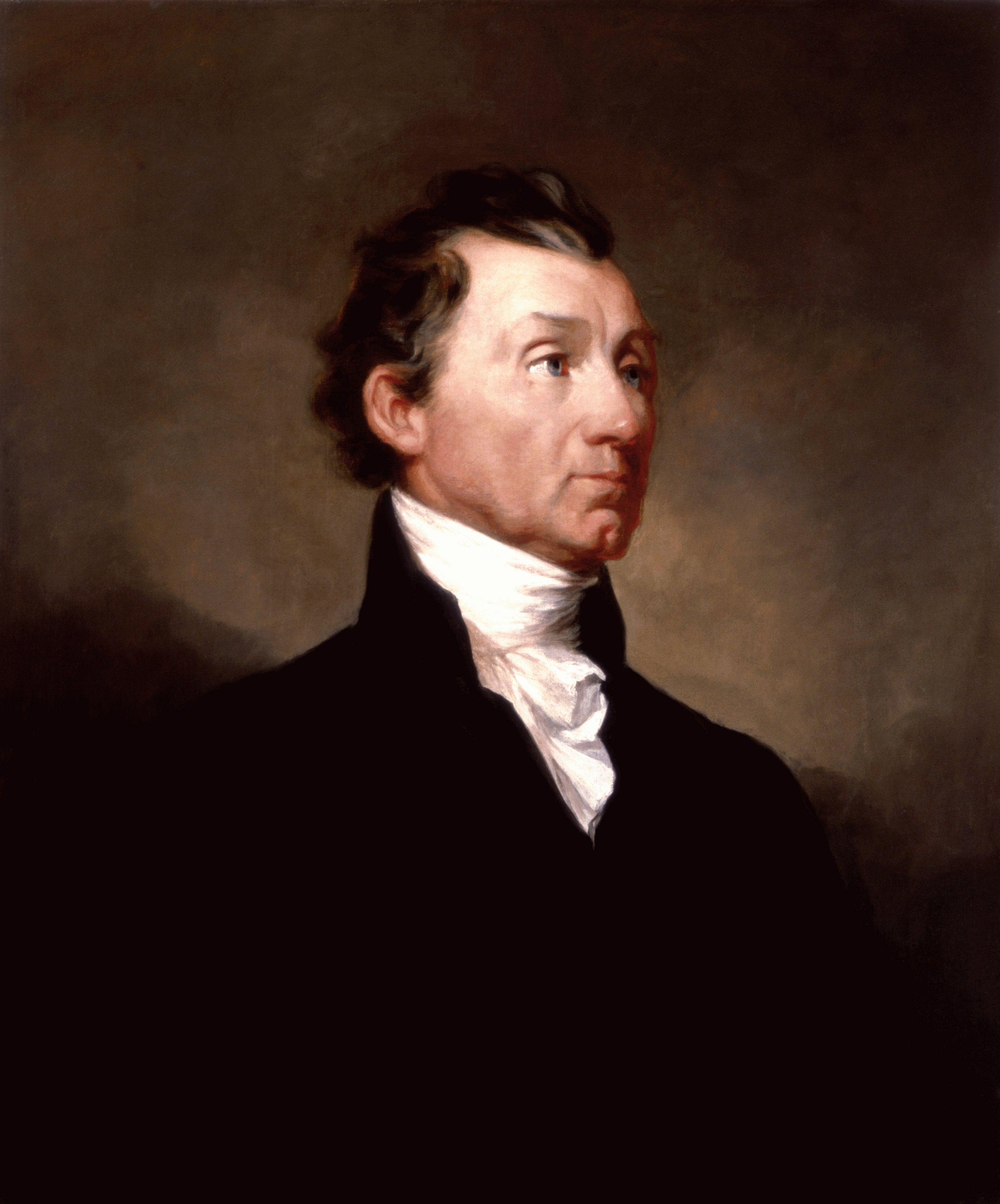
James Monroe

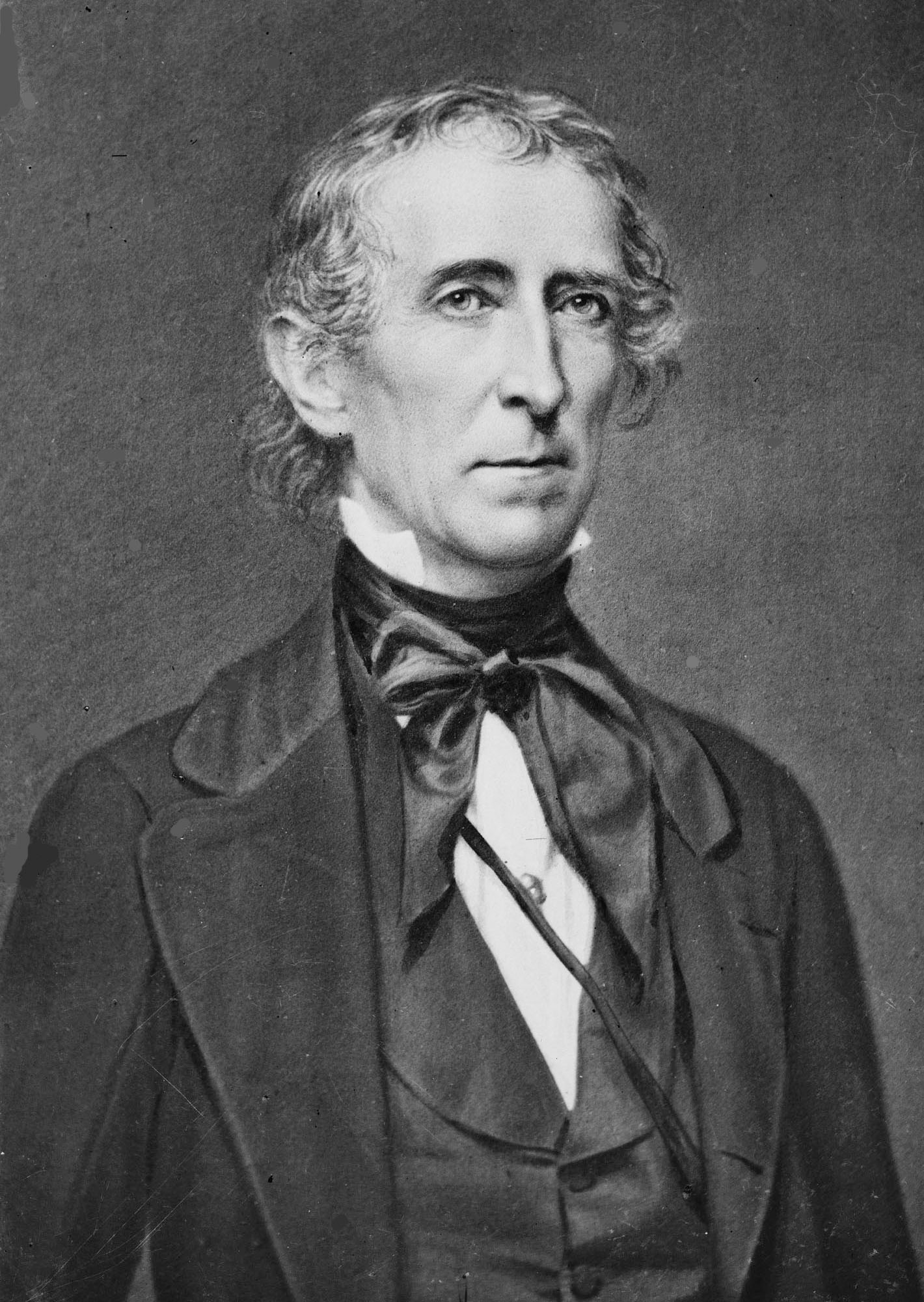
John Tyler

Three of the first ten U.S. presidents attended William & Mary.

The College of William & Mary, located in Williamsburg, Virginia, United States, was founded in 1693 by a royal charter issued by King William III and Queen Mary II. It is a public research university and has more than 94,000 living alumni.

Alumni of William & Mary have played important roles in shaping the United States. Three of the country's first ten presidents were educated there, one more than Harvard University's two. The school is also the alma mater of four United States Supreme Court justices (including its longest-serving chief justice, John Marshall). Because the school was one of the few colleges existing in the Colonies, many colonial era notables enrolled including four signers of the Declaration of Independence and the first president of the Continental Congress, Peyton Randolph.

This list of alumni includes those who graduated, transferred to another school, dropped out, or were fully educated at the college but never received an academic degree.

== Notations ==
This list uses the following notations:

- Year # – recipient of a William & Mary Bachelor of Arts, Bachelor of Science, or Bachelor of Business Administration degree
  - Note: A question mark represents an unverifiable value for the digit it replaced. For instance, the "?" in "179?" means that no specific year can be found, but the general decade can be traced.
- Juris Doctor (J.D.) – recipient of a William & Mary Law School degree or the historical equivalent such as Doctor of Laws (LL.D.) or Bachelor of Civil Law (B.C.L.)
- Master of Business Administration (M.B.A.) – recipient of a Mason School of Business degree or the historical equivalent
- Master of Education (M.Ed.) – recipient of a Graduate School of Education degree or the historical equivalent
- Master of Arts (M.A.), Master of Science (M.S.) or Doctor of Philosophy (Ph.D.) – recipient of indicated degree from an Arts and Sciences graduate program or the historical equivalent

== Federal government ==
=== Executive ===
==== President (Continental Congress) ====
| Name | Year | Notability | Ref. |
|---|---|---|---|
| Peyton Randolph | 1739 | First president of the Continental Congress (1774–75); attorney general of the Virginia Colony; buried beneath the Wren Chapel of William & Mary | |

==== Presidents (Constitution) ====
| Name | Year | Notability | Ref. |
|---|---|---|---|
| Thomas Jefferson | 1762 / LL.D. 1783 | Author of the Declaration of Independence (1776); governor of Virginia (1779–81); ambassador to France (1785–89); U.S. secretary of state (1789–93); vice president of the U.S. (1797–1801); president of the U.S. (1801–09); founded the University of Virginia (1819) | |
| James Monroe | 1776 | U.S. senator from Virginia (1790–94); ambassador to France (1794–96); governor of Virginia (1799–1802); ambassador to Great Britain (1803–07); governor of Virginia (1811); U.S. secretary of state (1811–14, 1815–17); U.S. secretary of war (1814–15); president of the U.S. (1817–25) | |
| John Tyler | 1807 | U.S. representative from Virginia (1816–21); governor of Virginia (1825–27); U.S. senator from Virginia (1827–36); vice president of the U.S. (1841); president of the U.S. (1841–45) | |
| George Washington* | 1749* | * Unofficial - received a surveyor's license only, never attended classes; first president of the United States (1789–97) | |

==== Cabinet ====
| Name | Year | Notability | Ref. |
|---|---|---|---|
| William T. Barry | 1803 | Member of Kentucky House of Representatives (1807); U.S. representative from Kentucky (1810–11); U.S. senator from Kentucky (1814–16); member of the Kentucky Senate (1817–21); lieutenant governor of Kentucky (1820–24); secretary of state of Kentucky (1824–25); U.S. postmaster general (1829–35); ambassador to Spain (1835) | |
| George M. Bibb | 1792 | U.S. senator from Kentucky (1811–14, 1829–35); U.S. secretary of the treasury (1844–45) | |
| James Boisseau | A.B. 1842 | Commissioner of the Revenue (1848–49, 1850); member of the Virginia House of Delegates (1857–58); justice of the peace (1860); member of the Secessionist Convention (1861); county judge (1870–1872) | |
| John Breckinridge | 1781 | U.S. senator from Kentucky (1801–05); U.S. attorney general (1805–06) | |
| Henry Clay | J.D. 1797 | U.S. senator from Kentucky (1806–07, 1810–11, 1831–42, 1849–52); U.S. representative for Kentucky (1811–14, 1815–21, 1823–25); speaker of the U.S. House of Representatives (1811–14, 1815–20, 1820–23); U.S. secretary of state (1825–29) | |
| John J. Crittenden | 1807 | U.S. senator from Kentucky (1817–19, 1835–41, 1842–48, 1855–61); U.S. attorney general (1841, 1850–53); U.S. representative from Kentucky (1861–63); governor of Kentucky (1848–50) | |
| Robert Gates | 1965 | Deputy national security adviser (1989–91); head of the Central Intelligence Agency (1991–93); U.S. secretary of defense (2006–2012); chancellor of the College of William and Mary (2012–present) | |
| Thomas Jefferson | 1762 / LL.D. 1783 | Author of the Declaration of Independence (1776); governor of Virginia (1779–81); ambassador to France (1785–89); U.S. secretary of state (1789–93); vice president of the U.S. (1797–1801); president of the U.S. (1801–09); founded the University of Virginia (1819) | |
| John Marshall | 1780 | U.S. representative from Virginia (1799–1800); U.S. secretary of state (1800–01); chief justice of the U.S. (1801–35) | |
| James Monroe | 1776 | U.S. senator from Virginia (1790–94); ambassador to France (1794–96); governor of Virginia (1799–1802); ambassador to Great Britain (1803–07); governor of Virginia (1811); U.S. secretary of state (1811–14, 1815–17); U.S. secretary of war (1814–15); president of the U.S. (1817–25) | |
| John Nelson | 1811 | U.S. representative from Maryland (1821–23); chargé d'affaires to the Two Sicilies (1831–32); U.S. attorney general (1843–45) | |
| Edmund Randolph | 1770 | Governor of Virginia (1786–88); U.S. attorney general (1789–94); U.S. secretary of state (1794–95) | |
| Thomas A. Shannon, Jr. | 1980 | U.S. assistant secretary of state for Western Hemisphere affairs (2005–2009), U.S. ambassador to Brazil (2010–2013), counselor of the United States Department of State (2013–2016), U.S. under secretary of state for political affairs (2011, 2016–present), acting United States secretary of state (2017), acting U.S. deputy secretary of state (2017) | |
| Alexander Hugh Holmes Stuart | 1825 | Transferred to the University of Virginia; U.S. representative for Virginia (1841–43); U.S. secretary of the interior (1850–53); member of the Virginia Senate (1857–61) | |

==== Ambassadors ====
| Name | Year | Notability | Ref. |
|---|---|---|---|
| Richard Clough Anderson Jr. | 1804 | U.S. representative from Kentucky (1817–21); first U.S. ambassador to Colombia (1823) | |
| William T. Barry | 1803 | Member of Kentucky House of Representatives (1807); U.S. representative from Kentucky (1810–11); U.S. senator from Kentucky (1814–16); member of the Kentucky Senate (1817–21); lieutenant governor of Kentucky (1820–24); secretary of state of Kentucky (1824–25); U.S. postmaster general (1829–35); U.S. ambassador to Spain (1835) | |
| George William Crump | 1806 | U.S. chargé d'affaires to Chile (1845–47) | |
| James Brown | 1784 | First secretary of state of Kentucky (1793-?); U.S. senator from Louisiana (1813–17, 1819–23); U.S. ambassador to France (1824–29) | |
| Charles A. Ford | 1972 | U.S. ambassador to Honduras (2005–08) | |
| Douglas A. Hartwick | 1972 | U.S. ambassador to Laos (2000–04) | |
| Thomas Jefferson | 1762 / LL.D. 1783 | Author of the Declaration of Independence (1776); governor of Virginia (1779–81); U.S. ambassador to France (1785–89); U.S. secretary of state (1789–93); vice president of the U.S. (1797–1801); president of the U.S. (1801–09); founded the University of Virginia (1819) | |
| Barbara A. Leaf | 1980 | U.S. ambassador to the United Arab Emirates (2014–2018) | |
| James Monroe | 1776 | U.S. senator from Virginia (1790–94); U.S. ambassador to France (1794–96); governor of Virginia (1799–1802); ambassador to Great Britain (1803–07); governor of Virginia (1811); U.S. secretary of state (1811–14, 1815–17); U.S. secretary of war (1814–15); president of the U.S. (1817–25) | |
| Hugh Nelson | 1780 | Member of the Virginia Senate (1786–91); member of the Virginia House of Delegates (1805–09, 1828–29); U.S. representative from Virginia (1811–23); U.S. ambassador to Spain (1823–24) | |
| John Nelson | 1811 | U.S. representative from Maryland (1821–23); chargé d'affaires to the Two Sicilies (1831–32); U.S. attorney general (1843–45) | |
| William Cabell Rives | 1809 | Member of Virginia House of Delegates (1817–20, 1822–23); U.S. representative from Virginia (1823–29); U.S. ambassador to France (1829–32, 1849–53); U.S. senator from Virginia (1832–34, 1836–39, 1841–45); representative to the Confederate House of Representatives from Virginia | |
| Janet A. Sanderson | 1977 | U.S. ambassador to Algeria (2000–2003); U.S. ambassador to Haiti (2006–2009); recipient of U.S. State Department's Herbert A. Salzman Award | |
| Charles L. Scott | 1846 | Member of the California Assembly (1854–56); U.S. representative from California (1857–61); U.S. ambassador to Venezuela (1885–89) | |
| Thomas A. Shannon, Jr. | 1980 | U.S. assistant secretary of state for Western Hemisphere affairs (2005–2009), U.S. ambassador to Brazil (2010–2013), counselor of the United States Department of State (2013–2016), U.S. under secretary of state for political affairs (2011, 2016–present), acting United States secretary of state (2017), acting U.S. deputy secretary of state (2017) | |
| William Short | 1779 | U.S. ambassador to France (1790–92), the Netherlands (1792), and Spain (1794–95) | |
| Fulwar Skipwith | — | Dropped out for military service; U.S. consul in Martinique; U.S. consul-general in France; instrumental in negotiating the Louisiana Purchase; president of the Republic of West Florida in 1810 | |
| Andrew Stevenson | 1800 | U.S. representative from Virginia (1821–34); speaker of the U.S. House of Representatives (1827–33); U.S. ambassador to Great Britain (1836–41) | |
| Charles Stewart Todd | 1809 | U.S. ambassador to Russia (1841–45) | |

=== Judiciary ===
==== United States Supreme Court ====
| Name | Year | Notability | Ref. |
|---|---|---|---|
| Philip P. Barbour | 1799 | U.S. representative from Virginia (1814–30); speaker of the U.S. House of Representatives (1821–23); U.S. district court judge (E.D. Va.) (1830–36); associate justice of the U.S. Supreme Court (1836–41) | |
| John Blair | 1754 | Associate justice of the U.S. Supreme Court (1789–95) | |
| John Marshall | 1780 | U.S. representative from Virginia (1799–1800); U.S. secretary of state (1800–01); chief justice of the U.S. (1801–35) | |
| Bushrod Washington | 1778 | Co-founder of Phi Beta Kappa society (1776); associate justice of the U.S. Supreme Court (1799–1829) | |

==== Other federal courts ====
| Name | Year | Notability | Ref. |
|---|---|---|---|
| Carol Amon | 1968 | U.S. magistrate judge (E.D.N.Y.) (1986–90); U.S. district court judge (E.D.N.Y.) (1990–present) | |
| Philip P. Barbour | 1799 | U.S. representative from Virginia (1814–30); speaker of the U.S. House of Representatives (1821–23); U.S. district court judge (E.D. Va.) (1830–36); associate justice of the U.S. Supreme Court (1836–41) | |
| John White Brockenbrough | 1824 | U.S. district court judge (W.D. Va.) (1846–61) and founder of the Washington and Lee University School of Law | |
| Ronald L. Buckwalter | B.C.L. 1962 | U.S. district court judge (E.D. Pa.) (1990–2003) | |
| Glen E. Conrad | 1971 / J.D. 1974 | U.S. magistrate judge (W.D. Va.) (1976–2003); U.S. district judge (W.D. Va. 2003–present) | |
| Theodore Roosevelt Dalton | 1924 / L.L.B. 1926 | U.S. district court judge (W.D. Va.) (1959–89); chief judge (W.D. Va.) (1960–71) | |
| John H. Dillard | J.D. 1840 | Associate justice of the North Carolina Supreme Court (1878–81) | |
| Powhatan Ellis | J.D. 1814 | Associate justice (one of the original) of the Mississippi Supreme Court (1818–25); U.S. senator from Mississippi (1825–26, 1827–32); U.S. district court judge (D. Miss.) (1832–36) | |
| Walter Edward Hoffman | J.D. 1930 | U.S. district court judge (E.D. Va.) (1954–96); chief judge (E.D. Va.) (1961–73) | |
| Charles Sterling Hutcheson | J.D. 1914 | U.S. district court judge (E.D. Va.) (1944–69) | |
| Haldane Robert Mayer | J.D. 1971 | U.S. circuit court judge (Fed. Cir.) (1987–2010) | |
| William McGuire | 17?? | First chief justice of the Mississippi Territory | |
| Robert P. Morris | — | Transferred to Virginia Military Institute; U.S. representative from Minnesota (1897–1903); U.S. district court judge (D. Minn.) (1903–23) | |
| Charles Andrew Muecke | 1941 | U.S. attorney (D. Ariz.) (1961–64); U.S. district court judge (D. Ariz.) (1964–2007); chief judge (D. Ariz.) (1979–84) | |
| Gregory A. Presnell | 1964 | U.S. district court judge (M.D. Fla.) (2000–present) | |
| Thomas B. Robertson | 1807 | U.S. representative from Louisiana (1812–18); governor of Louisiana (1820–24); U.S. district court judge (D. La.) (1825–27) | |
| Rebecca Beach Smith | 1971 / J.D. 1979 | U.S. magistrate judge (E.D. Va.) (1985–89); U.S. district court judge (E.D. Va.) (1989–present); Virginia's first female federal judge | |
| Richard J. Sullivan | 1986 | U.S. district court judge (S.D.N.Y.) (2007–18); U.S. circuit court judge (2d Cir.) (2018–present) | |
| George Keith Taylor | 1793 | U.S. circuit court judge (4th Cir.) (1801–02) | |
| St. George Tucker | 1772 | Lawyer and professor of law at William & Mary; justice of the Virginia Supreme Court of Appeals (1803–11); U.S. district court judge (D. Va.) (1813–?) | |
| John Tyler, Sr. | 1754 | Member of Virginia House of Delegates (1777–88); governor of Virginia (1808–11); U.S. district court judge (D. Va.) (1811–13) | |
| Susan Davis Wigenton | J.D. 1987 | U.S. magistrate judge (N.J.) (2000–06); U.S. district court judge (D.N.J.) (2006–present) | |

=== Legislative ===
==== Representatives (Continental Congress) ====
| Name | Year | Notability | Ref. |
|---|---|---|---|
| Richard Bland | 1766 | Member of Continental Congress (1774–75); served multiple terms in House of Burgesses; colonial rights advocate who publicly opposed England's Stamp Act | |
| Carter Braxton | 1755 | Member of Continental Congress (1775–76); signer of the Declaration of Independence (1776) | |
| William Fleming | 1763 | Member of the Continental Congress (1779); an original justice of the Virginia Supreme Court of Appeals (1789–1824); chief justice of the Virginia Supreme Court of Appeals (1809–1824) | |
| Benjamin Harrison V | 1745 | Member of Continental Congress from Virginia (1774–77); signer of U.S. Declaration of Independence (1776); governor of Virginia (1781–84) | |
| Thomas Jefferson | 1762 / LL.D. 1783 | Author of the Declaration of Independence (1776); governor of Virginia (1779–81); ambassador to France (1785–89); U.S. secretary of state (1789–93); vice president of the U.S. (1797–1801); president of the U.S. (1801–09); founded the University of Virginia (1819) | |
| John Francis Mercer | 1775 | Delegate to the Continental Congress (1787); U.S. representative from Maryland (1791–94); governor of Maryland (1801–03) | |
| James Monroe | 1776 | U.S. senator from Virginia (1790–94); ambassador to France (1794–96); governor of Virginia (1799–1802); ambassador to Great Britain (1803–07); governor of Virginia (1811); U.S. secretary of state (1811–14, 1815–17); U.S. secretary of war (1814–15); president of the U.S. (1817–25) | |
| George Plater | 1752 | Delegate to the Continental Congress from Maryland (1778–80); governor of Maryland (1791–92) | |
| Peyton Randolph | 1739 | First president of the Continental Congress (1774–75); attorney general of the Virginia Colony; buried beneath the Wren Chapel of William & Mary | |
| George Washington | (1749)* * Unofficial - received a surveyor's license only, never attended classes | First president of the U.S. (1789–97) | |
| George Wythe | 1746 | Member of Continental Congress (1775–76); signer of U.S. Declaration of Independence (1776); America's first professor of law, College of William and Mary (1769–89) | |

==== Senators ====
| Name | Year | Notability | Ref. |
|---|---|---|---|
| William S. Archer | 1806 | U.S. representative from Virginia (1820–35); U.S. senator from Virginia (1841–47) | |
| William T. Barry | 1803 | Member of Kentucky House of Representatives (1807); U.S. representative from Kentucky (1810–11); U.S. senator from Kentucky (1814–16); member of the Kentucky Senate (1817–21); lieutenant governor of Kentucky (1820–24); secretary of state of Kentucky (1824–25); U.S. postmaster general (1829–35); ambassador to Spain (1835) | |
| Thomas Hart Benton | 18?? | Member of Tennessee Senate (1809–11); U.S. senator from Missouri (1821–51); U.S. representative from Missouri (1853–55) | |
| George M. Bibb | 1795 | U.S. senator from Kentucky (1811–1814); U.S. secretary of the treasury (1844–45) | |
| William Wyatt Bibb | 1796 | U.S. representative from Georgia (1807–13); U.S. senator from Georgia (1813–16); territorial governor of Alabama (1817–19); governor of Alabama (1819–20) | |
| Lemuel Jackson Bowden | 1832 | U.S. senator from Virginia (1863–64) | |
| James Brown | 1784 | U.S. senator from Louisiana (1813–17, 1819–23); U.S. ambassador to France (1824–29) | |
| John Brown | 1780 | U.S. representative from Virginia (1789–92); U.S. senator from Kentucky (1792–1805) | |
| Henry Chambers | 1808 | U.S. senator from Alabama (1825–26) | |
| William C. C. Claiborne | 1790 | U.S. representative from Tennessee (1797–1801); governor of the Mississippi Territory (1801–05), Territory of Orleans (1803–12), and of Louisiana (1812–16); U.S. senator from Louisiana (1817) | |
| Henry Clay | J.D. 1797 | U.S. senator from Kentucky (1806–07, 1810–11, 1831–42, 1849–52); U.S. representative from Kentucky (1811–14, 1815–21, 1823–25); speaker of the U.S. House of Representatives (1811–14, 1815–20, 1820–23); U.S. secretary of state (1825–29) | |
| Richard Coke | 1848 | Governor of Texas (1874–76); U.S. senator from Texas (1877–95) | |
| John J. Crittenden | 1807 | U.S. senator from Kentucky (1817–19, 1835–41, 1842–48, 1855–61); U.S. sttorney general (1841, 1850–53); U.S. representative from Kentucky (1861–63); governor of Kentucky (1848–50) | |
| Powhatan Ellis | J.D. 1814 | Associate justice (one of the original) of the Mississippi Supreme Court (1818–25); U.S. senator from Mississippi (1825–26, 1827–32); U.S. district court judge (D. Miss.) (1832–36) | |
| William Branch Giles | J.D. 1781 | U.S. representative from Virginia (1790–98, 1801–03); member of the Virginia House of Delegates (1798–1801, 1816–17, 1826–27); U.S. senator from Virginia (1804–15); governor of Virginia (1827–30) | |
| Guy D. Goff | 18?? | U.S. senator from West Virginia (1925–31) | |
| Edwin Gray | 17?? | Member of Virginia House of Delegates (1776, 1779, 1787, 1788, 1791); Virginia Senate (1777–79); U.S. representative from Virginia (1799–1813) | |
| David Holmes | 1795 | U.S. representative from Virginia (1797–1808); last governor of Mississippi Territory and first governor of Mississippi (1808–20, 1826); U.S. senator from Mississippi (1821–25) | |
| Benjamin W. Leigh | 1802 | Member of Virginia House of Delegates (1811–13, 1830–31); U.S. senator from Virginia (1834–36) | |
| Armistead Thomson Mason | 1807 | U.S. senator from Virginia (1816–17) | |
| Stevens Thomson Mason | 1780 | U.S. senator from Virginia (1794–1803) | |
| James Murray Mason | J.D. 1820 | U.S. representative from Virginia (1837–39); U.S. senator from Virginia (1847–61) | |
| James Monroe | 1776 | U.S. senator from Virginia (1790–94); ambassador to France (1794–96); governor of Virginia (1799–1802); ambassador to Great Britain (1803–07); governor of Virginia (1811); U.S. secretary of state (1811–14, 1815–17); U.S. secretary of war (1814–15); president of the U.S. (1817–25) | |
| Jackson Morton | 1815 | U.S. senator from Florida (1849–55) and Confederate Representative (1861–62) | |
| Robert C. Nicholas | 1816 | U.S. senator from Louisiana (1836–41) | |
| Wilson Cary Nicholas | 1779 | U.S. senator from Virginia (1799–1804); U.S. representative from Virginia (1807–09); governor of Virginia (1814–17) | |
| James Pleasants | J.D. 1785 | Member of Virginia House of Delegates (1797–1802); clerk of the Virginia House of Delegate (1803–11); U.S. representative from Virginia (1811–19); U.S. senator from Virginia (1819–22); governor of Virginia (1822–25) | |
| John Pope | 1790 | U.S. senator from Kentucky (1807–1813); governor of the Arkansas Territory (1829–35); U.S. representative from Kentucky (1837–43) | |
| William Cabell Rives | 1809 | Member of Virginia House of Delegates (1817–20, 1822–23); U.S. representative from Virginia (1823–29); U.S. ambassador to France (1829–32, 1849–53); U.S. senator from Virginia (1832–34, 1836–39, 1841–45); member of the Confederate House of Representatives from Virginia | |
| William Roane | 1804 | Member of Virginia House of Delegates (1812–15); U.S. representative from Virginia (1815–17); U.S. senator from Virginia (1837–41) | |
| Daniel Smith | 1765 | U.S. senator from Tennessee (1798–99, 1805–09) | |
| John Taylor | 1772 | U.S. senator from Virginia (1792–94, 1803, 1822–23, 1823–24) | |
| Henry Tazewell | 1770 | Justice of the Virginia Supreme Court of Appeals (1785–89); chief justice of Virginia Supreme Court of Appeals (1789–93); U.S. senator from Virginia (1794–99) | |
| Littleton Waller Tazewell | 1791 | Member of the Virginia House of Delegates (1798–1800, 1804–06, 1816–17); U.S. representative from Virginia (1800–01); U.S. senator from Virginia (1824–32); governor of Virginia (1834–36) | |
| John Tyler | 1807 | U.S. representative from Virginia (1816–21); governor of Virginia (1825–27); U.S. senator from Virginia (1827–36); vice president of the U.S. (1841); president of the U.S. (1841–45) | |
| John Walker | 1764 | U.S. senator from Virginia (1790) | |

==== Speakers of the House ====
| Name | Year | Notability | Ref. |
|---|---|---|---|
| Philip P. Barbour | 1799 | U.S. representative from Virginia (1814–30); speaker of the House of Representatives (1821–1823); U.S. district judge (E.D. Va.) (1830–36); associate justice of the U.S. Supreme Court (1836–41) | |
| Henry Clay | J.D. 1797 | U.S. senator from Kentucky (1806–07, 1810–11, 1831–42, 1849–52); U.S. representative from Kentucky (1811–14, 1815–21, 1823–25); speaker of the U.S. House of Representatives (1811–14, 1815–20, 1820–23); U.S. secretary of state (1825–29) | |
| John Winston Jones | 1813 | U.S. representative from Virginia (1835–45); speaker of the U.S. House of Representatives (1843–45); member of Virginia House of Delegates (1846–48) | |
| Andrew Stevenson | 1800 | U.S. representative from Virginia (1821–34); speaker of the U.S. House of Representatives (1827–33); U.S. ambassador to Great Britain (1836–41) | |

==== Representatives ====
| Name | Year | Notability | Ref. |
|---|---|---|---|
| Robert Allen | 17?? | U.S. representative from Tennessee (1819–27) | |
| Richard Clough Anderson Jr. | 1804 | U.S. representative from Kentucky (1817–21); first U.S. ambassador to Columbia (1823) | |
| William S. Archer | 1806 | U.S. representative from Virginia (1820–35); U.S. senator from Virginia (1841–47) | |
| Archibald Atkinson | J.D. 1813 | U.S. representative from Virginia (1843–49) | |
| Michele Bachmann | L.L.M. 1988 | U.S. representative from Minnesota (2007–2015) | |
| Linn Banks | 1806 | U.S. representative from Virginia (1838–41) | |
| John S. Barbour | 1808 | Member of the Virginia House of Delegates (1813–16, 1820–23, 1833–34); U.S. representative from Virginia (1823–33) | |
| Philip P. Barbour | 1799 | U.S. representative from Virginia (1814–30); speaker of the House of Representatives (1821–1823); U.S. district judge (1830–36); associate justice of the U.S. Supreme Court (1836–41) | |
| William T. Barry | 1803 | Member of Kentucky House of Representatives (1807); U.S. representative from Kentucky (1810–11); U.S. senator from Kentucky (1814–16); member of the Kentucky Senate (1817–21); lieutenant governor of Kentucky (1820–24); secretary of state of Kentucky (1824–25); U.S. postmaster general (1829–35); ambassador to Spain (1835) | |
| Burwell Bassett | 1782 | Member of the Virginia House of Delegates (1787–89); member of the Virginia Senate (1794–1805); U.S. representative from Virginia (1805–29) | |
| Herbert H. Bateman | 1949 | U.S. representative from Virginia (1982–2000) | |
| Thomas Hart Benton | 18?? | Member of Tennessee Senate (1809–11); U.S. senator from Missouri (1821–51); U.S. representative from Missouri (1853–55) | |
| Karen D. Beyer | 1991 | U.S. representative from Pennsylvania (2005–2010) | |
| William Wyatt Bibb | 1796 | U.S. representative from Georgia (1807–13); U.S. senator from Georgia (1813–16); territorial governor of Alabama (1817–19); governor of Alabama (1819–20) | |
| Schuyler Otis Bland | 1896 | U.S. representative from Virginia (1918–50) | |
| James Breckinridge | 1785 | Member of the Virginia House of Delegates (1789–1802, 1806–08, 1819–21, 1823–24); U.S. representative from Virginia (1809–17) | |
| John Brown | 1780 | U.S. representative from Virginia (1789–92); U.S. senator from Kentucky (1792–1805) | |
| William A. Burwell | 1801 | U.S. representative from Virginia (1806–21) and presidential secretary | |
| Samuel Cabell | — | Left to join Revolutionary Army; member of Virginia House of Delegates (1785–92); U.S. representative from Virginia (1795–1803) | |
| Eric Cantor | J.D. 1988 | U.S. representative from Virginia (2001–2014); House minority whip (2008–2011); House majority leader (2011–2014) | |
| Steve Chabot | 1975 | U.S. representative from Ohio (1994–2009) (2011–present) | |
| William C.C. Claiborne | 1790 | U.S. representative from Tennessee (1797–1801); governor of the Mississippi Territory (1801–05), Territory of Orleans (1803–12), and of Louisiana (1812–16); U.S. senator from Louisiana (1817) | |
| Henry Clay | J.D. 1797 | U.S. senator from Kentucky (1806–07, 1810–11, 1831–42, 1849–52); U.S. representative from Kentucky (1811–14, 1815–21, 1823–25); speaker of the U.S. House of Representatives (1811–14, 1815–20, 1820–23); U.S. secretary of state (1825–29) | |
| Richard Coke, Jr. | 1815 | U.S. representative from Virginia (1829–33) | |
| Isaac Coles | 1768 | Member of the Virginia House of Delegates (1780–81, 1783–88); U.S. representative from Virginia (1789–91, 1793–97) | |
| Robert Eugene Cook | J.D. 1950 | U.S. representative from Ohio (1959–63) | |
| John J. Crittenden | 1807 | U.S. senator from Kentucky (1817–19, 1835–41, 1842–48, 1855–61); U.S. attorney general (1841, 1850–53); U.S. representative from Kentucky (1861–63); governor of Kentucky (1848–50) | |
| Jacob Davis | 1837 | Member of the Illinois Senate (1842–48, 1850–56); U.S. representative from Illinois (1856–57) | |
| Joseph J. Davis | 18?? | U.S. representative from North Carolina (1875–81) | |
| Henry Dearborn | 1803 | U.S. representative from Massachusetts (1831–33) | |
| Beverly Douglas | 1843 | Delegate to the Virginia constitutional convention (1850–51); member of the Virginia Senate (1852–65); U.S. representative from Virginia (1875–78) | |
| George Dromgoole | 1817 | Member of the Virginia House of Delegates (1823–26); member of the Virginia Senate (1826–35); U.S. representative from Virginia (1835–41) | |
| Paul Edmunds | 1857 | Member of the Virginia Senate (1881–88); U.S. representative from Virginia (1889–95) | |
| Joseph Eggleston | 1776 | U.S. representative from Virginia (1798–1801) | |
| Thomas Evans | 1775 | U.S. representative from Virginia (1797–1801) | |
| Oliver Frey | 1915 | U.S. representative from Pennsylvania (1933–39) | |
| Matt Gaetz | J.D. 2007 | U.S. representative from Florida's 1st congressional district (2017–2024) | |
| William Goode | 1819 | Member of the Virginia House of Delegates (1822–23, 1824–33, 1839–41, 1845–47); U.S. representative from Virginia (1841–43, 1852–53) | |
| Edwin Gray | 17?? | U.S. representative from Virginia (1799–1813) | |
| Carter Harrison | 1776 | Member of the Virginia House of Delegates (1784–86, 1805–08); U.S. representative from Virginia (1793–99) | |
| Joseph H. Hawkins | 1807 | Member of Kentucky House of Representatives (1810–13); U.S. representative from Kentucky (1814–15) | |
| Thomas Haymond | 18?? | U.S. representative from Virginia's 15th congressional district (1849–51) | |
| John Heath | 1777 | U.S. representative from Virginia (1793–97); founding member and first president of Phi Beta Kappa Society | |
| David Holmes | 1795 | U.S. representative from Virginia (1797–1808); last governor of Mississippi Territory and first governor of Mississippi (1808–20, 1826); U.S. senator from Mississippi (1821–25) | |
| J. Murray Hooker | 1892 | U.S. representative from Virginia (1921–25) | |
| Benjamin Howard | 1797 | U.S. representative from Kentucky (1807–10) | |
| James Johnson | 179? | Member of the Virginia House of Delegates (1797–1804, 1806, 1807, 1809–13); U.S. representative from Virginia (1813–20) | |
| John Winston Jones | 1813 | U.S. representative from Virginia (1835–45); speaker of the U.S. House of Representatives (1843–45) | |
| Walter Jones | 1760 | U.S. representative from Virginia (1797–99, 1803–11) | |
| John William Lawson | 1858 | Member of the Virginia House of Delegates (1869–73, 1883–84); member of the Virginia Senate (1874–77); U.S. representative from Virginia (1891–93) | |
| Richard Bland Lee | 1780 | U.S. representative from Virginia (1789–95) | |
| William M. Levy | 1844 | U.S. representative from Louisiana (1875–77) | |
| George Loyall | 1808 | Member of the Virginia House of Delegates (1818–27); U.S. representative from Virginia (1830–31, 1833–37) | |
| John Marshall | 1780 | U.S. representative from Virginia (1799–1800); U.S. secretary of state (1800–01); chief justice of the U.S. (1801–35) | |
| James Murray Mason | J.D. 1820 | U.S. representative from Virginia (1837–39); U.S. senator from Virginia (1847–61) | |
| Robert Mayo | 1808 | Member of the Virginia House of Delegates (1881, 1882, 1885–88); U.S. representative from Virginia (1883–84) | |
| William M. McCarty | 1814 | Member of the Virginia Senate (1823, 1830–39); U.S. representative from Virginia (1840–41) | |
| John Francis Mercer | 1775 | Delegate to the Continental Congress (1787); U.S. representative from Maryland (1791–94); governor of Maryland (1801–03) | |
| Alan Mollohan | 1966 | U.S. representative from West Virginia (1983–2011) | |
| Andrew Jackson Montague | 1874 | U.S. attorney (W.D. Va.) (1893–98); attorney general of Virginia (1898–1902); governor of Virginia (1902–06); U.S. representative from Virginia (1913–37) | |
| Robert P. Morris | — | Transferred to Virginia Military Institute; U.S. representative from Minnesota (1897–1903); U.S. district court judge (D. Minn.) (1903–23) | |
| Jeremiah Morton | 1819 | U.S. representative from Virginia's 9th congressional district (1849–51) | |
| Stephanie Murphy | 2000 | U.S. representative from Florida's 7th congressional district (2017–present) | |
| Hugh Nelson | 1780 | Member of the Virginia Senate (1786–91); member of the Virginia House of Delegates (1805–09, 1828–29); U.S. representative from Virginia (1811–23); U.S. ambassador to Spain (1823–24) | |
| John Nelson | 1811 | U.S. representative from Maryland's 4th District (1821–23); chargé d'affaires to Two Sicilies (1831–32); U.S. attorney general (1843–45); U.S. secretary of state (ad interim) (six days, 1844) | |
| Roger Nelson | 1775 | U.S. representative from Maryland's 4th congressional district (1804–10) | |
| Willoughby Newton | 182? | Member of the Virginia House of Delegates (1826–32); U.S. representative from Virginia (1843–45) | |
| John Nicholas | 177? | U.S. representative from Virginia (1793–1801); member of the New York Senate (1806–09) | |
| Wilson Cary Nicholas | 1779 | U.S. senator from Virginia (1799–1804); U.S. representative from Virginia (1807–09); governor of Virginia (1814–17) | |
| John Nicholls | 1855 | U.S. representative from Georgia (1879–81, 1883–85) | |
| John Page | 1757 | Lieutenant governor of Virginia (1776–79); member of the Virginia House of Delegates (1781–81, 1785–88, 1797, 1798, 1800, 1801); U.S. representative from Virginia (1789–1797); governor of Virginia (1802–05) | |
| Robert Page | — | Left to join Revolutionary Army; U.S. representative from Virginia (1799–1801) | |
| Thomas Plater | 178? | U.S. representative from Maryland (1801–05) | |
| James Pleasants | J.D. 1785 | Member of the Virginia House of Delegates (1797–1802); clerk of the Virginia House of Delegates (1803–11); U.S. representative from Virginia (1811–19); U.S. senator from Virginia (1819–22); governor of Virginia (1822–25) | |
| John Pope | 1790 | Governor of the Arkansas Territory (1829–35); U.S. representative from Kentucky (1837–43) | |
| Francis Preston | 1783 | Member of the Virginia House of Delegates (1788–89, 1812–14); U.S. representative from Virginia (1793–97) | |
| Thomas Randolph | 1783 | Member of the Virginia House of Delegates (1793–94; 1819–20, 1823–25); U.S. representative from Virginia (1803–07); governor of Virginia (1819–22) | |
| William Cabell Rives | 1809 | Member of the Virginia House of Delegates (1817–20, 1822–23); U.S. representative from Virginia (1823–29); U.S. ambassador to France (1829–32; 1849–53); U.S. senator from Virginia (1832–34, 1836–39, 1841–45); member of the Confederate House of Representatives from Virginia | |
| John Robertson | 1804 | U.S. representative from Virginia (1834–39); member of the Virginia Senate (1861–63) | |
| Thomas B. Robertson | 1807 | U.S. representative from Louisiana (1812–18); governor of Louisiana (1820–24); U.S. district court judge (D. La.) (1825–27) | |
| Samuel Sawyer | 1819 | U.S. representative from North Carolina (1837–39) | |
| Charles L. Scott | 1846 | Member of the California Assembly (1854–56); U.S. representative from California (1857–61); U.S. Ambassador to Venezuela (1885–89) | |
| Dennis Smelt | 178? | U.S. representative from Georgia (1806–11) | |
| Arthur Smith | 1805 | U.S. representative from Virginia (1821–24) | |
| Ballard Smith | 1802 | Member of the Virginia House of Delegates (1810–13, 1824–26, 1836, 1837); U.S. representative from Virginia (1815–21) | |
| Andrew Stevenson | 180? | Member of the Virginia House of Delegates (1809–16, 1818–21) and served as speaker (1812–15); U.S. representative from Virginia (1821–34); speaker of the U.S. House of Representatives (1827–33); U.S. ambassador to Great Britain (1836–41) | |
| George Strother | 180? | Member of the Virginia House of Delegates (1806–09); U.S. representative from Virginia (1817–21) | |
| Archibald Stuart | 1780 | Member of the Virginia House of Delegates (1830–31); U.S. representative from Virginia (1837–39) | |
| Littleton Waller Tazewell | 1791 | Member of the Virginia House of Delegates (1798–1800, 1804–06, 1816–17); U.S. representative from Virginia (1800–01); U.S. senator from Virginia (1824–32); governor of Virginia (1834–36) | |
| Philip R. Thompson | 178? | U.S. representative from Virginia (1801–07) | |
| Dina Titus | 1970 | U.S. representative from Nevada (2009–2011, 2013–present) | |
| David Trimble | 1799 | U.S. representative from Kentucky (1817–27) | |
| William Tuck | — | Transferred to Washington and Lee University; member of the Virginia House of Delegates (1924–32); Virginia Senate (1932–42); lieutenant governor of Virginia (1942–46); governor of Virginia (1946–50); U.S. representative from Virginia (1953–69) | |
| George Tucker | 1797 | Member of the Virginia House of Delegates (1815); U.S. representative from Virginia (1819–25) | |
| Henry St. George Tucker, Sr. | 1798 | U.S. representative from Virginia (1815–19); member of the Virginia Senate (1819–23); justice of the Virginia Supreme Court of Appeals (1831–41) | |
| Daniel Turner | 1817 | Member of the North Carolina House of Commons (1819–23); U.S. representative from North Carolina (1827–29) | |
| John Tyler | 1807 | U.S. representative from Virginia (1816–21); governor of Virginia (1825–27); U.S. senator from Virginia (1827–36); vice president of the U.S. (1841); president of the U.S. (1841–45) | |
| John Vanmeter | 1821 | Member of the Virginia House of Delegates (1824); member of the Ohio House of Representatives (1836); member of the Ohio Senate (1838); U.S. representative from Ohio (1843–45) | |
| Robert Smith Walker | — | Transferred to Millersville University of Pennsylvania; U.S. representative from Pennsylvania's 16th district (1977–97) | |
| Jennifer Wexton | J.D. 1995 | Representative from Virginia's 10th congressional district (2019–present) | |
| George Douglas Wise | 1855 | U.S. representative from Virginia (1881–89, 1889–90, 1891–95) | |
| Richard Alsop Wise | — | Left to join Confederate Army; member of the Virginia House of Delegates (1885–87); U.S. representative from Virginia (1898–99, 1900) | |

=== Other federal positions ===
| Name | Year | Notability | Ref. |
|---|---|---|---|
| John J. Beckley | 177? | Mayor of Richmond, Virginia (1783–84, 1788–89); first clerk of the U.S. House of Representatives (1789–97, 1802–07); first librarian of the United States Congress (1802–07) | |
| John L. Brownlee | J.D. 1994 | U.S. attorney (W.D. Va.) (2001–06) | |
| Robert J. Cleary | 1977 | U.S. attorney (D.N.J.); lead prosecutor in the Unabomber case | |
| James B. Comey | 1982 | FBI director (2013–17); U.S. deputy attorney general (2003–05); United States attorney for the Southern District of New York (2002–03) | |
| Michael J. Garcia | M.A 1984 | United States attorney for the Southern District of New York (2005–08); assistant secretary of Homeland Security for Immigration and Customs Enforcement (2003–05); commissioner of the Immigration and Naturalization Service (2002–03); associate judge of the New York Court of Appeals (2016–present) | |
| Jonathan Jarvis | 1975 | Director of the National Park Service (2009–2017) | |
| David N. Kelley | 1981 | United States attorney for the Southern District of New York (2003–2005) | |
| Susan Livingstone | 1968 | Undersecretary of the U.S. Navy (2001–03) | |
| Robert M. McDowell | J.D. 1990 | Lawyer; former FCC commissioner | |
| Andrew Jackson Montague | 1874 | U.S. attorney (W.D. Va.) (1893–98); attorney general of Virginia (1898–1902); governor of Virginia (1902–06); U.S. representative from Virginia (1913–37) | |
| John E. Osborn | 1979 | Commissioner, U.S. Advisory Commission on Public Diplomacy (2008–present); former general counsel of Cephalon (1998–2008) | |
| Tony Pham | J.D. 1995 | U.S. prosecutor (2000–2008), former acting director for Immigration and Customs Enforcement (2020) | |
| Michael Powell | 1985 | Chairman of the Federal Communications Commission (2001–05); son of former Secretary of State Colin Powell | |
| Jen Psaki | 2000 | White House press secretary for Joe Biden (2020–2022); assistant to the president of the United States and the White House communications director for Barack Obama (2009–2011); spokesperson for the United States Department of State (2013–2015) | |
| Thomas A. Shannon, Jr. | 1980 | U.S. assistant secretary of state for Western Hemisphere affairs (2005–2009), U.S. ambassador to Brazil (2010–2013), counselor of the United States Department of State (2013–2016), U.S. under secretary of state for political affairs (2011, 2016–present), acting United States secretary of state (2017), acting U.S. deputy secretary of state (2017) | |
| Shari Villarosa | J.D. 1978 | U.S. chargé d'affaires to Burma (2005–08) | |
| Mary Jo White | 1970 | U.S. attorney (S.D.N.Y.) (1993–2002); chairwoman of the SEC (2013–2017) | |

== State and local government ==
=== Governors ===
==== Virginia ====
| Name | Year | Notability | Ref. |
|---|---|---|---|
| William H. Cabell | 1793 | Governor of Virginia (1805–08); judge of the Virginia Supreme Court of Appeals (1811–51); chief judge of the Virginia Supreme Court of Appeals (1841–52) | |
| John N. Dalton | 1954 | Member of the Virginia House of Delegates (1966–72); member of the Virginia Senate (1972–73); lieutenant governor of Virginia (1974–78); governor of Virginia (1978–82) | |
| William Branch Giles | 1781 | U.S. congressman from Virginia (1790–98, 1801–03); member of the Virginia House of Delegates (1798–1801, 1816–17, 1826–27); U.S. senator from Virginia (1804–15); governor of Virginia (1827–30) | |
| Mills E. Godwin Jr. | 1934 / LL.D. 1966 | Member of the Virginia Senate (1952–62); lieutenant governor of Virginia (1962–66); governor of Virginia (1966–70, 1974–78) | |
| John Munford Gregory | 1832 | Member of the Virginia House of Delegates (1831–40); governor of Virginia (1842–1843) | |
| Benjamin Harrison V | 1745 | Member of Continental Congress from Virginia (1774–77); signer of U.S. Declaration of Independence (1776); governor of Virginia (1781–84) | |
| Thomas Jefferson | 1762 / LL.D. 1783 | Author of the Declaration of Independence (1776); governor of Virginia (1779–81); ambassador to France (1785–89); U.S. secretary of state (1789–93); vice president of the U.S. (1797–1801); president of the U.S. (1801–09); founded the University of Virginia (1819) | |
| James Monroe | 1776 | U.S. senator from Virginia (1790–94); ambassador to France (1794–96); governor of Virginia (1799–1802); ambassador to Great Britain (1803–07); governor of Virginia (1811); U.S. secretary of state (1811–14, 1815–17); U.S. secretary of war (1814–15); president of the U.S. (1817–25) | |
| Andrew Jackson Montague | 1874 | U.S. attorney (W.D. Va.) (1893–98); attorney general of Virginia (1898–1902); governor of Virginia (1902–06); U.S. representative from Virginia (1913–37) | |
| Wilson Cary Nicholas | 1779 | Member of the Virginia House of Delegates (1784–89, 1794–99); U.S. senator from Virginia (1799–1804); U.S. representative from Virginia (1807–09); governor of Virginia (1814–17) | |
| John Page | 1763 | Lieutenant governor of Virginia (1776–79); member of the Virginia House of Delegates (1781–83, 1785–88); U.S. representative from Virginia (1789–1797); governor of Virginia (1802–05) | |
| James Pleasants | J.D. 1791 | Member of Virginia House of Delegates (1797–1802); clerk of the Virginia House of Delegate (1803–11); U.S. representative from Virginia (1811–19); U.S. senator from Virginia (1819–22); governor of Virginia (1822–25) | |
| James Patton Preston | 1795 | Governor of Virginia (1816–19) | |
| Beverley Randolph | 1772 | Governor of Virginia (1788–91) | |
| Edmund Randolph | 1770 | Governor of Virginia (1786–88); U.S. attorney general (1789–1794); U.S. secretary of state (1794–95) | |
| Peyton Randolph | 1798 | Governor of Virginia (1811–12) | |
| Thomas Mann Randolph, Jr. | 1783 | Member of the Virginia Senate (1793–94); U.S. representative from Virginia (1803–07); governor of Virginia (1819–22) | |
| Wyndham Robertson | 1821 | Governor of Virginia (1836–37); member of the Virginia House of Delegates (1838–41, 1859–65) | |
| Littleton Waller Tazewell | 1791 | Member of the Virginia House of Delegates (1798–1800, 1804–06, 1816–17); U.S. representative from Virginia (1800–01); U.S. senator from Virginia (1824–32); governor of Virginia (1834–36) | |
| John Tyler | 1807 | U.S. representative from Virginia (1816–21); governor of Virginia (1825–27); U.S. senator from Virginia (1827–36); vice president of the U.S. (1841); president of the U.S. (1841–45) | |
| William Munford Tuck | 1917 / LL.D. 1948 | Governor of Virginia (1946–50); U.S. representative from Virginia (1953–69) | |
| John Tyler, Sr. | 1765 | Governor of Virginia (1808–11) | |

==== Other states and territories ====
| Name | Year | Notability | Ref. |
|---|---|---|---|
| William Wyatt Bibb | 1796 | U.S. representative from Georgia (1807–13); U.S. senator from Georgia (1813–16); territorial governor of Alabama (1817–19); governor of Alabama (1819–20) | |
| William D. Bloxham | 1855 | Governor of Florida (1881–85, 1897–1901) | |
| Gerard Brandon | 1809 | Governor of Mississippi (1825–26, 1826–32) | |
| William C.C. Claiborne | 1790 | U.S. representative from Tennessee (1797–1801); governor of the Mississippi Territory (1801–05), Territory of Orleans (1803–12), and Louisiana (1812–16); U.S. senator from Louisiana (1817) | |
| Edward Coles | 1807 | Governor of Illinois (1822–26) | |
| Richard Coke | 1848 | Associate justice of the Texas Supreme Court (1866–67); governor of Texas (1874–76); U.S. senator from Texas (1877–95) | |
| John J. Crittenden | 1807 | U.S. senator from Kentucky (1817–19, 1835–41, 1842–48, 1855–61); U.S. attorney general (1841, 1850–53); U.S. representative from Kentucky (1861–63); governor of Kentucky (1848–50) | |
| David Holmes | 1795 | U.S. representative from Virginia (1797–1808); last governor of Mississippi Territory (?-1817); first governor of Mississippi (1817–19, 1826); U.S. senator from Mississippi (1821–25) | |
| Benjamin Howard | 1797 | Last governor of the Louisiana Territory; first governor of Missouri Territory (1810–12) | |
| John Francis Mercer | 1775 | Delegate to the Continental Congress (1787); U.S. representative from Maryland (1791–94); governor of Maryland (1801–03) | |
| Walter R. Peterson, Jr. | 1946 | Member of New Hampshire House of Representatives (1963–68); speaker of the N.H. House of Representatives (1965–68); governor of New Hampshire (1969–73) | |
| George Plater | 1752 | Delegate to the Continental Congress from Maryland (1778–80); governor of Maryland (1791–92) | |
| John Pope | 1790 | Third governor of Arkansas Territory (1829–35); a member of the United States House of Representatives from Kentucky (1837–43), secretary of state of Kentucky (1816–19) | |
| Thomas B. Robertson | 1807 | U.S. representative from Louisiana (1812–18); governor of Louisiana (1820–24); U.S. district court judge (D. La.) (1825–27) | |

=== State legislators ===
==== Virginia ====
| Name | Year | Notability | Ref. |
|---|---|---|---|
| Hunter Andrews | 1942 | Member of the Virginia Senate | |
| Briscoe Baldwin | 1808 | Member of the Virginia House of Delegates (1818–20, 1841–42); justice of the Virginia Supreme Court of Appeals (1842–52) | |
| John S. Barbour | 1808 | Member of the Virginia House of Delegates (1813–16, 1820–23, 1833–34); U.S. representative from Virginia (1823–33) | |
| Burwell Bassett | 1782 | Member of the Virginia House of Delegates (1787–89); member of the Virginia Senate (1794–1805); U.S. representative from Virginia (1805–29) | |
| James Breckinridge | 1785 | Member of the Virginia House of Delegates (1789–1802, 1806–08, 1819–21, 1823–24); U.S. representative from Virginia (1809–17) | |
| Robert H. Brink | J.D. 1978 | Member of the Virginia House of Delegates (1998–2014) | |
| David Bulova | 1991 | Member of the Virginia House of Delegates (2006–present) | |
| Samuel Cabell | — | Left to join Revolutionary Army; member of the Virginia House of Delegates (1785–92); U.S. representative from Virginia (1795–1803) | |
| Eric Cantor | J.D. 1988 | U.S. representative from Virginia (2001–2014); House minority whip (2008–2011); House majority leader (2011–2014) | |
| Dabney Carr | 1763 | Member of the Virginia House of Burgesses and brother-in-law of Thomas Jefferson | |
| Isaac Coles | 1768 | Member of the Virginia House of Delegates (1780–81, 1783–88); U.S. representative from Virginia (1789–91, 1793–97) | |
| Beverly Douglas | 1843 | Delegate to the Virginia constitutional convention (1850–51); member of the Virginia Senate (1852–65); U.S. representative from Virginia (1875–78) | |
| Ashton Dovell | LL.D. 19?? | Member of the Virginia House of Delegates (1924–42); speaker of the Virginia House of Delegates (1936–42) | |
| Mark Earley | 1976 / J.D. 1982 | Member of the Virginia Senate (1988–98); attorney general of Virginia (1998–2001) | |
| Thomas Evans | 1775 | Member of the Virginia House of Delegates (1780–81, 1794–96, 1805–06); U.S. representative from Virginia (1797–1801) | |
| William Goode | 1819 | Member of Virginia House of Delegates (1822–23, 1824–33, 1839–41, 1845–47); U.S. Congressman from Virginia (1841–43, 1852–53) | |
| Edwin Gray | 17?? | Member of Virginia House of Delegates (1776, 1779, 1787, 1788, 1791); Virginia Senate (1777–79); U.S. representative from Virginia (1799–1813) | |
| John Munford Gregory | 1832 | Member of the Virginia House of Delegates (1831–40); governor of Virginia (1842–1843) | |
| Phil Hamilton | 1979 | Member of the Virginia House of Delegates (1988–2009) | |
| Carter Harrison | 1776 | Member of the Virginia House of Delegates (1784–86, 1805–08); U.S. representative from Virginia (1793–99) | |
| Henry Howell | 1956 | Member of the Virginia House of Delegates (1960–66); member of the Virginia Senate (1966–71); lieutenant governor of Virginia (1971–73) | |
| Tim Hugo | 1986 | Member of the Virginia House of Delegates (2003–present) | |
| Jay Jones | 2010 | Member of the Virginia House of Delegates (2018–2022), attorney general of Virginia (2026-) | |
| Orlando Jones | 1699 | Member of the Virginia House of Burgesses (1714, 1715, 1718) from King William County; grandfather of Martha Washington | |
| James Johnson | 179? | Member of the Virginia House of Delegates (1797–1804, 1806, 1807, 1809–13); U.S. representative for Virginia (1813–20) | |
| Terry Kilgore | J.D. 1986 | Member of the Virginia House of Delegates (1993–present) | |
| George Loyall | 1808 | Member of the Virginia House of Delegates (1818–27); U.S. representative for Virginia (1830–31, 1833–37) | |
| Monty Mason | 1989 | Member of the Virginia Senate (2017–present); member of the Virginia House of Delegates (2014–2016) | |
| Ryan McDougle | J.D. 1996 | Member of the Virginia House of Delegates (2002–05); member of the Virginia Senate (2005–present) | |
| Bill Mims | 1979 | Member of the Virginia House of Delegates (1992–98); member of the Virginia Senate (1998–2006); 46th attorney general of Virginia (2009–10); justice of the Supreme Court of Virginia (2010–present) | |
| Jason Miyares | J.D. 2005 | Member of the Virginia House of Delegates (2016–present), attorney general, Commonwealth of Virginia | |
| Hugh Nelson | 1780 | Member of the Virginia Senate (1786–91); member of the Virginia House of Delegates (1805–09, 1828–29); U.S. representative for Virginia (1811–23); U.S. ambassador to Spain (1823–24) | |
| Willoughby Newton | 182? | Member of the Virginia House of Delegates (1826–32); U.S. representative for Virginia (1843–45) | |
| Tommy Norment | J.D. 1973 | Member of the Virginia Senate (1992–present); majority leader of the Virginia Senate (2012–present) | |
| Joseph Prentis | 1777 | Member of the Virginia Convention (1775); judge of the Virginia Admiralty Court (1776); member of the Virginia House of Delegates (1777-?); speaker of the Virginia House of Delegates (1778-?); member of the Privy Council (1779-?) | |
| Thomas Randolph | 178? | Member of the Virginia House of Delegates (1793–94; 1819–20, 1823–25); U.S. representative for Virginia (1803–07); governor of Virginia (1819–22) | |
| Gary Reese | 1967 | Member of the Virginia House of Delegates | |
| John Robertson | 1804 | U.S. representative for Virginia (1834–39); member of the Virginia Senate (1861–63) | |
| Briana Sewell | | Member of the Virginia House of Delegates (2022–present) | |
| George Strother | 180? | Member of the Virginia House of Delegates (1806–09); U.S. representative for Virginia (1817–21) | |
| Frederick Southgate Taylor | 1867 | Democratic delegate for Norfolk in the Virginia House of Delegates; founder of Pi Kappa Alpha fraternity; businessman, politician, and philanthropist | |
| Littleton Waller Tazewell | 1791 | Member of the Virginia House of Delegates (1798–1800, 1804–06, 1816–17); U.S. representative for Virginia (1800–01); U.S. senator for Virginia (1824–32); governor of Virginia (1834–36) | |
| Philip R. Thompson | 17?? | Member of the Virginia House of Delegates (1793–97); U.S. representative for Virginia (1801–07) | |
| Jill Holtzman Vogel | 1992 | Member of the Virginia Senate (2007–2009) | |
| Jennifer Wexton | J.D. 1995 | Member of the Virginia Senate (2014–2018) | |
| Richard Alsop Wise | — | Left to join Confederate Army; member of the Virginia House of Delegates (1885–87); U.S. representative from Virginia (1898–99, 1900) | |

==== Other states and territories ====
| Name | Year | Notability | Ref. |
|---|---|---|---|
| Hunter Abell | 2002 | Member of the Washington House of Representatives (2025–present) | |
| Branch T. Archer | 1804 | Texas commissioner to the United States (1835–1836); speaker of the Republic of Texas House of Representatives (1837); secretary of war of the Republic of Texas (1840–1841) | |
| Thomas Hart Benton | 18?? | Member of the Tennessee Senate (1809–11); U.S. senator from Missouri (1821–51); U.S. representative from Missouri (1853–55) | |
| Todd Book | J.D. 1993 | Member of the Ohio House of Representatives (2008–2010) | |
| Cameron S. Brown | — | Transferred to the University of Missouri–Kansas City; member of the Michigan House Representatives (1999–2001); member of the Michigan Senate (2003–2010) | |
| Jacob Davis | 1837 | Member of the Illinois Senate (1842–48, 1850–56); U.S. representative from Illinois (1856–57) | |
| John J. Flanagan | 1983 | Member of the New York State Assembly (1987–2002); member of the New York Senate (2003–present) | |
| Emily McAsey | 2000 | Member of the Illinois House of Representatives (2009–2017) | |
| Duane Milne | 1990 | Member of the Pennsylvania House of Representatives (2007–2018) | |
| John Nicholas | 177? | U.S. representative from Virginia (1793–1801); member of the New York Senate (1806–09) | |
| Walter R. Peterson, Jr. | 1946 | Member of the New Hampshire House of Representatives (1963–68); speaker of the N.H. House of Representatives (1965–68); governor of New Hampshire (1969–73) | |
| David C. Russo | 19?? | Member of the New Jersey General Assembly (1990–present) | |
| Charles L. Scott | 1846 | Member of the California Assembly (1854–56); U.S. representative from California (1857–61); U.S. ambassador to Venezuela (1885–89) | |
| Peyton Short | 1780 | Member of the first Kentucky Senate (1792–96) | |
| Harriett Stanley | 1972 | Member of the Massachusetts House of Representatives (2005–13) | |
| John Louis Taylor | 1785 | Member of the North Carolina General Assembly (1792, 1794–95); first chief justice of the North Carolina Supreme Court (1818–29) | |
| Daniel Turner | 1817 | Member of the North Carolina House of Commons (1819–23); U.S. representative from North Carolina (1827–29) | |
| John I. Vanmeter | — | Transferred to Princeton College; member of the Virginia House of Delegates (1824); member of the Ohio House of Representatives (1836); member of the Ohio Senate (1838); U.S. representative from Ohio (1843–45) | |

=== State courts ===
==== Virginia Supreme Court ====
The Virginia Supreme Court has been known by other names since its creation. Most recently, the Virginia Supreme Court was known as the Supreme Court of Appeals until 1970. Regardless of name used, this sub-list is limited to members of the highest court of the state. Other state judges can be found in the following sub-list dedicated to Other positions.

| Name | Year | Notability | Ref. |
|---|---|---|---|
| Briscoe Baldwin | 1808 | Member of Virginia House of Delegates (1818–20, 1841–42); justice of the Virginia Supreme Court of Appeals (1842–52) | |
| William Brockenbrough | 1798 | Justice of the Virginia Supreme Court of Appeals (1834–38) | |
| William H. Cabell | 1793 | Governor of Virginia (1805–08); justice of the Virginia Supreme Court of Appeals (1811–51) | |
| Paul Carrington | 1768 | Justice of the Virginia Supreme Court of Appeals (1789–1807) | |
| John Coalter | J.D. 1789 | Justice of the Virginia Supreme Court of Appeals (1811–?) | |
| William Fleming | 1763 | Member of the Continental Congress (1779); an original justice of the Virginia Supreme Court of Appeals (1789–1824); chief justice of the Virginia Supreme Court of Appeals (1809–1824) | |
| Lawrence W. I'Anson | 1928 | Justice of the Virginia Supreme Court of Appeals | |
| Elizabeth A. McClanahan | 1980 | Chief deputy Virginia attorney general (2002–2003); judge of Virginia Court of Appeals (2003–2011); justice of the Virginia Supreme Court of Appeals (2011–) | |
| James Mercer | 1752 | Member of the Continental Congress (1779); judge of the General Court of Virginia (1779–89); an original justice of the Virginia Supreme Court of Appeals (1789–1793) | |
| Bill Mims | 1979 | Member of the Virginia House of Delegates (1992–98); member of the Virginia Senate (1998–2006); 46th attorney general of Virginia (2009–10); justice of the Supreme Court of Virginia (2010–present) | |
| Spencer Roane | 1777 | Justice of the Virginia Supreme Court of Appeals (1794–1822) | |
| Claude V. Spratley | 1901 | Justice of the Virginia Supreme Court of Appeals (1936–67) | |
| Robert Stanard | 1824 | Justice of the Virginia Supreme Court of Appeals (1839–46) | |
| Walter Redd Staples | 1846 | Member of Virginia House of Delegates (1853–54); delegate to Provisional Congress of the Confederate States of America (1861); representative from Virginia to the Confederate Congress (1862–65); justice of the Virginia Supreme Court of Appeals (1870–82) | |
| Henry Tazewell | 1770 | Justice of the Virginia Supreme Court (1785–89); chief justice of Virginia Supreme Court of Appeals (1789–93); U.S. Senator from Virginia (1794–99) | |
| Henry St. George Tucker, Sr. | 1798 / J.D. 1801 | Law professor at the College of William and Mary (1801–04); justice of the Virginia Supreme Court of Appeals (1824–31); author of the College of William and Mary honor pledge (1842) | |
| St. George Tucker | 1772 | Lawyer and professor of law at William & Mary; Virginia Supreme Court of Appeals judge (1803–11); U.S. district court judge (D. Va.) (1813–?) | |

==== Other states' high courts ====
| Name | Year | Notability | Ref. |
|---|---|---|---|
| Richard Coke | 1848 | Associate justice of the Texas Supreme Court (1866–67); governor of Texas (1874–76); U.S. senator from Texas (1877–95) | |
| Powhatan Ellis | J.D. 1814 | Associate justice (one of the original) of the Mississippi Supreme Court (1818–25); U.S. senator from Mississippi (1825–26, 1827–32); U.S. district court judge (D. Miss.) (1832–36) | |
| Reuben Gaines | — | Transferred to Cumberland University; associate justice of the Texas Supreme Court (1886–94); chief justice of the Texas Supreme Court (1894–1911) | |
| John Griffin | 1790 | Associate justice of the Michigan Supreme Court (1806–23) | |
| John Hall | 178? | One of three original justices of the North Carolina Supreme Court (1818–33) | |
| Helen E. Hoens | 1976 | Associate justice of the New Jersey Supreme Court (2006–2013) | |
| John Louis Taylor | 1785 | Member of the North Carolina General Assembly (1792, 1794–95); first chief justice of the North Carolina Supreme Court (1818–29) | |
| Nancy Waples | 1982 | Associate justice of the Vermont Supreme Court (2022–present) | |

=== Other positions ===
| Name | Year | Notability | Ref. |
|---|---|---|---|
| Viola Baskerville | 1973 | Virginia secretary of administration; former state delegate; former vice mayor of Richmond, Virginia | |
| Randolph A. Beales | 1982 | Judge, Virginia Court of Appeals; former attorney general of Virginia | |
| Richard Bland | 1766 | Member of Continental Congress (1774–75); served multiple terms in House of Burgesses; colonial rights advocate who publicly opposed England's Stamp Act | |
| Thomas Russell Bowden | 1861 | Attorney general of the restored government of Virginia (1863–1865) and Virginia (1865–1869) | |
| Carter Braxton | 1755 | Member of Continental Congress (1775–76); signer of the Declaration of Independence (1776) | |
| Jacob Frey | 2004 | Mayor of Minneapolis, Minnesota | |
| Kelly Gee | 2010 | Secretary of the Commonwealth of Virginia (2024–2026) | |
| Gurbir Grewal | J.D. 1999 | Attorney General of New Jersey (2018–2021) | |
| Jim D. Hansen | 1982 | Executive director of the Idaho Democratic Party | |
| John N. Hendren | 1850 | Virginia lawyer; second treasurer of the Confederate States of America | |
| Henry Howell | 1956 | Member of the Virginia House of Delegates (1960–66); member of the Virginia Senate (1966–71); lieutenant governor of Virginia (1971–73) | |
| Robert M. Hughes | 1873 | President of the Virginia Bar Association; helped establish what became Old Dominion University | |
| Karen Jackson | M.B.A. 1991 | Former Virginia secretary of technology; appointed in 2014 by Governor Terry McAuliffe; the last to serve in the office before it was dissolved under Governor Ralph Northam | |
| Ann Hitch Kilgore | 1944 | Mayor of Hampton, Virginia (1963–71, 1974–78) | |
| Jerry Kilgore | J.D. 1986 | Attorney general of Virginia (2001–05) | |
| Roy Martin | 1940 | Mayor of Norfolk, Virginia (1962–1974), president of the United States Conference of Mayors (1973–1974) | |
| George M.B. Maughs | 185? | Mayor of Kansas City, Missouri (1860) | |
| William McMillan | 1787 | Member of the Northwest Territory House of Representatives (1799–1800); delegate to the U.S. House of Representatives from Northwest Territory (1800–01) | |
| Bill Mims | 1979 | Member of the Virginia House of Delegates (1992–98); member of the Virginia Senate (1998–2006); 46th attorney general of Virginia (2009–10); justice of the Supreme Court of Virginia (2010–present) | |
| Christina Romer | 1981 | Chair, Council of Economic Advisors (2009–2010) | |
| Malfourd W. Trumbo | 1977 / J.D. 1983 | Circuit court judge in the 25th Circuit of Virginia | |

== Academia ==
=== College presidents and chancellors ===
| Name | Year | Notability | Ref. |
|---|---|---|---|
| John Bracken | 1791 | Episcopal priest; president of the College of William & Mary (1812–14); rector of Bruton Parish Church | |
| Warren Buck | MSc 1970 / PhD 1976 | Physics professor, first chancellor of the University of Washington, Bothell | |
| John Croghan | 1809 | Medical doctor; director of the United States Marine Hospital of Louisville; first to develop Mammoth Cave as a tourist destination | |
| Thomas Dawson | 1737 | Anglican priest; president of the College of William & Mary (1755–60); commissary of the bishop of London; rector of Bruton Parish Church | |
| Thomas Roderick Dew | 1820 | Professor of history, metaphysics, and political economy at the College of William and Mary (1827–36); president of the College of William and Mary (1836–46) | |
| Mary Maples Dunn | 1954 | President of Smith College (1985–1995) | |
| David Ellenson | 1969 | President of Hebrew Union College-Jewish Institute of Religion (2002–present) | |
| Robert Gates | 1965 | President of Texas A&M University (2002–2006) | |
| William A. Griffin | 19?? | President of Mid-Atlantic Christian University (1986–2006) | |
| Hugh Blair Grigsby | LL.D. 1855 | Chancellor of the College of William & Mary; president of the Virginia Historical Society | |
| Tiberius G. Jones | 1845 | President of Richmond College (now University of Richmond) (1866–69) | |
| Penelope W. Kyle | M.B.A. 1987 | President of Radford University (2005–2016) | |
| Peter J. Liacouras | 1952 | President of Temple University (1981–2000) | |
| James Madison | 1771 | Episcopal priest, first bishop of the Episcopal Diocese of Virginia; president of the College of William and Mary (1777–1812) | |
| Andrew Martin | 1994 | Dean, College of Literature, Science, and the Arts, University of Michigan (2014–2018); chancellor, Washington University in St. Louis (2019–present) | |
| Carolyn Martin | 1973 | President of Amherst College (2008–present) | |
| Tisa Mason | Ed.S. '91/ Ed.D. '93 | President of Fort Hays State University (2017–present) | |
| John Lloyd Newcomb | 1900 | President of the University of Virginia (1931–47) | |
| William Barton Rogers | 1824 | Founder and first president of Massachusetts Institute of Technology (1861–70, 1878–81) (attended 1819–1824 but did not receive degree and no evidence for graduation, according to MIT Libraries) | |
| Henry Rosovsky | 1949 / LL.D. 1976 | Economist, professor, and university administrator; acting president of Harvard University (1984, 1987) | |
| Edward Seidel | 1981 | President of the University of Wyoming | |
| John B. Stephenson | 1959 | Sociologist and scholar of Appalachia; director of the Appalachian Studies Conference (1979–84); president of Berea College (1984–94) | |
| William Stith | 1720 | Anglican priest; president of the College of William & Mary (1752–55); educated at the Grammar School at William & Mary; trained for ministry at Queen's College, Oxford | |
| Timothy J. Sullivan | 1966 | Dean of the Marshall-Wythe School of Law (1985–92); president of the College of William and Mary (1992–2005) | |
| Paul R. Verkuil | 1961 | President of the College of William & Mary (1985–92); appointed by U.S. Supreme Court as special master for Ellis Island dispute; former dean of Cardozo Law School; chairman of Administrative Conference of the United States | |
| Shearer West | 1981 | Art historian; vice-chancellor and president of the University of Leeds (UK) | |
| William Yates | 174? | Anglican priest; president of the College of William & Mary (1761–64) | |

=== Professors ===
| Name | Year | Notability | Ref. |
|---|---|---|---|
| Emerson Baker | Ph.D. 1986 | Historical archaeologist and professor of history at Salem State College | |
| Stephen R. Barley | 1975 | Structuration and organizational theory, professor of management science and engineering at Stanford University | |
| Elizabeth Hill Boone | 1970 | Pre-Columbian art historian and professor of Latin American art at Tulane University | |
| John Boswell | 1969 | History professor at Yale University and recipient of the National Book Award | |
| Jerry Coyne | 1971 | Prominent critic of intelligent design theory; professor at University of Chicago; was valedictorian of his graduating class | |
| Joseph Ellis | 1965 | History professor at Mount Holyoke College; author of The New York Times bestseller Founding Brothers: The Revolutionary Generation which received 2001 Pulitzer Prize | |
| Lesley J. Gordon | 1987 | Military historian specializing in the American Civil War; holds the Charles G. Summersell Chair of Southern History at the University of Alabama | |
| John Graham | 1983 | Financial economist; professor at Duke University's Fuqua School of Business; research associate for the National Bureau of Economic Research | |
| George S. Oldfield | 19?? | Professor of Finance at the Mason School of Business at the College of William & Mary; faculty member at the Amos Tuck School of Business Administration at Dartmouth College and the S.C. Johnson Graduate School of Management at Cornell University | |
| Gregory Pence | 1970 | Professor in the department of philosophy at the University of Alabama at Birmingham | |
| Lisa Sanders | 1979 | Associate professor of medicine at Yale University; columnist with The New York Times; physician and writer | |
| Robert E. Scott | J.D. 1968 | Law professor and contract law scholar at Columbia Law School; dean of University of Virginia Law School (1991–2001); fellow, American Academy of Arts and Sciences (1999) | |
| Nicole Shelton | 1993 | Stuart Professor of Psychology at Princeton University | |
| Megan Squire | 1994 | Professor in computer science at Elon University, studies right-wing political extremism online | |
| William J. Stuntz | 1980 | Henry J. Friendly Professor of Law at Harvard Law School; criminal law expert | |
| Dennis Frank Thompson | 1962 | Professor at Harvard University | |
| Henry St. George Tucker, Sr. | 1798 / J.D. 1801 | Law professor at the College of William and Mary (1801–04); justice of the Virginia Supreme Court of Appeals (1824–31); author of the College of William and Mary's honor pledge (1842) | |
| George Wythe | 1746 | America's first professor of law, College of William and Mary (1769–89); member of Continental Congress (1775–76); signer of U.S. Declaration of Independence (1776) | |

== Religion ==
| Name | Year | Notability | Ref. |
|---|---|---|---|
| John Boyd Bentley | 1921 | Episcopal priest; second bishop of the Episcopal Diocese of Alaska; attended 1915–16, 1920–21, but did not graduate; trained for ministry at the Virginia Theological Seminary | |
| John Bracken | 1791 | Episcopal priest; president of the College of William & Mary (1812–14); rector of Bruton Parish Church | |
| Pamela Pauly Chinnis | 1946 | First female president of the Episcopal Church's House of Deputies | |
| Thomas Dawson | 1737 | Anglican priest; president of the College of William & Mary (1755–60); commissary of the Bishop of London; rector of Bruton Parish Church | |
| Harry Lee Doll | 1930 | Episcopal priest; bishop of the Episcopal Diocese of Maryland; trained for ministry at the Virginia Theological Seminary (1933) | |
| David Ellenson | 1969 | Rabbi and leader in American Reform Judaism; ordained at the Hebrew Union College-Jewish Institute of Religion | |
| Philip Ludwell III | 173? | Earliest known Eastern Orthodox Christian in North America, liturgist, and representative of Jamestown in the House of Burgesses | |
| James Madison | 1771 | Episcopal priest; first bishop of the Episcopal Diocese of Virginia; president of the College of William and Mary (1777–1812) | |
| John Payne | 1833 | Episcopal priest; first bishop of the Episcopal Diocese of Liberia; trained for ministry at the Virginia Theological Seminary (1836) | |
| Katherine Hancock Ragsdale | 1980 | Episcopal priest; former dean of the Episcopal Divinity School; trained for ministry at the Virginia Theological Seminary (1987) | |
| Alfred Magill Randolph | 1855 | Episcopal priest; first bishop of the Episcopal Diocese of Southern Virginia; trained for ministry at the Virginia Theological Seminary (1858) | |
| John Stark Ravenscroft | 1790 | Episcopal priest, first bishop of the Episcopal Diocese of North Carolina | |
| William Stith | 1720 | Anglican priest; president of the College of William & Mary (1752–55); educated at the Grammar School at William & Mary; trained for ministry at Queen's College, Oxford | |
| Calvin Cabell Tennis | 1954 | Episcopal priest; ninth bishop of the Episcopal Diocese of Delaware; trained for ministry at the Virginia Theological Seminary | |
| Channing Moore Williams | 1852 | Episcopal priest; first Episcopal bishop of China and Japan; trained for ministry at the Virginia Theological Seminary | |
| Wayne P. Wright | 1975 | Episcopal priest; tenth bishop of the Episcopal Diocese of Delaware; trained for ministry at Sewanee: The University of the South | |
| William Yates | 1744? | Anglican priest, president of the College of William & Mary (1761–64) | |

== Arts and media ==
=== Film ===
| Name | Year | Notability | Ref. |
|---|---|---|---|
| Dylan Baker | — | Transferred to Southern Methodist University; actor in films Kinsey and Road to Perdition | |
| Jaycee Chan | — | Dropped out after two semesters; actor and singer; son of movie star Jackie Chan | |
| Glenn Close | 1974 | Actress in films Dangerous Liaisons and Fatal Attraction and the stage production of Sunset Boulevard; nominee for an Oscar (eight times); winner of three Tonys, an Obie, four Emmys, two Golden Globes, and a Screen Actors Guild Award | |
| John Coven | 1980 | Storyboard artist of films The Lion King, Jurassic World and X-Men | |
| David Crank | 1982 | Production designer of Knives Out (Art Directors Guild Award nomination), The Master, Inherent Vice, Art Director on Lincoln, There Will Be Blood, Water for Elephants | |
| Rebecca Gibel | 2001 | Actress in films CODA and Finestkind | |
| Scott Glenn | 1963 | Actor in films The Hunt for Red October and The Silence of the Lambs | |
| Cord Jefferson | 2004 | Director, writer, and producer of American Fiction, Oscar winner, Academy Award for Best Adapted Screenplay (2024) | |
| Martin Jurow | 1932 | Hollywood agent, executive assistant and film producer | |
| Ashley Edward Miller | 1994 | Screenwriter of films Thor and X-Men: First Class | |
| Jeffrey Tinnell | 1985 | Producer of films Son of the Pink Panther, Frankenstein and Me, and Feast of the Seven Fishes | |

=== Music ===
| Name | Year | Notability | Ref. |
|---|---|---|---|
| Douglas Appling | 2008 | Known by his stage name Emancipator, is a producer and disc jockey based in Portland, Oregon | |
| Mark Doyon | 1985 | Recording artist and producer; led the indie rock bands Arms of Kismet, Wampeters and Waterslide; founder and principal of the record label and media company Wampus Multimedia | |
| Cleve Francis | M.A. 1969 | Country music singer, songwriter, and cardiologist | |
| Scott Miller | 1990 | Musician and founder of the band Scott Miller and the Commonwealth | |
| Travis Morrison | — | Musician, leader of The Dismemberment Plan; dropped out after three years | |
| Thao Nguyen | 2006 | Folk rock artist signed to Kill Rock Stars with band, Thao with the Get Down Stay Down; produced music for 2011 documentary American Teacher | |
| Wes Swing | 2004 | Singer-songwriter | |
| Will Toledo | 2014 | Lead singer of indie rock band Car Seat Headrest | |

=== Television ===
| Name | Year | Notability | Ref. |
|---|---|---|---|
| David Burke | 1988 | Actor in numerous television shows, including Law & Order, The Tick, Brothers & Sisters, Joan of Arcadia and Grey's Anatomy | |
| Michael Burns | — | Transferred to UCLA after his freshman year; star of Wagon Train, It's a Man's World, and various films; also an historian of Modern Europe and professor emeritus at Mount Holyoke College | |
| Kelly Choi | 1999 | Multiple Emmy-nominated television personality on NYC Media | |
| Steven Culp | 1978 | Television actor, has appeared in Desperate Housewives, The West Wing, and Star Trek: Enterprise | |
| Justin Deas | 1970 | Actor, Guiding Light | |
| Ben Domenech | — | Left for position at United States Department of Health and Human Services in 2002 just prior to his senior year; broadcast journalist and publisher; co-founder of The Federalist; married to Meghan McCain | |
| Charles Esten | 1987 | Comedian, singer and actor known for his appearances on the improvisation show Whose Line Is It Anyway? and The Office, as Deacon Claybourne on Nashville, and as Ward Cameron on Netflix's Outer Banks | |
| Jenny Hagel | 1998 | Comedian and comedy writer; writes and performs for Late Night with Seth Meyers; executive producer and head writer on The Amber Ruffin Show | |
| Karen Hall | 1978 | Television writer of CBS's Judging Amy and M*A*S*H | |
| Weijia Jiang | 2005 | Broadcast journalist, CBS News | |
| Chris Kerson | 1992 | Actor, best known for his role as Nails on season two of True Detective | |
| Linda Lavin | 1959 | Actress; winner of Tony, Emmy, and Golden Globe Awards; starred on the television sitcom Alice | |
| Bill Lawrence | 1990 | Creator and writer of Ted Lasso and Scrubs television series | |
| Tommy Newsom | 1949 | Graduated from the Norfolk division of William & Mary (present day Old Dominion University); saxophone player in the NBC Orchestra on The Tonight Show Starring Johnny Carson | |
| Ryan O'Quinn | 1994 | Actor, television and movies | |
| Patton Oswalt | 1991 | Comedian; film and television actor | |
| Doug Petrie | 1985 | Screenwriter, director, and producer best known as a writer, director, and co-executive producer on Buffy the Vampire Slayer | |
| Linda Powell | 1989 | television actress; daughter of Colin Powell | |
| Jamieson Price | 1983 | Voice actor, best known for numerous anime and video games | |
| Paula Reid | 2005 | CNN senior legal affairs correspondent | |
| Sara Schaefer | 2000 | Comedian; writer, producer, and co-host on MTV's Nikki & Sara Live and Late Night with Jimmy Fallon | |
| Kyle Soller | — | Transferred to the Royal Academy of Dramatic Art in London after studying abroad there in his third year; Olivier Award-winning actor known for roles in theatrical productions and shows An Inspector Calls and Andor | |
| Jon Stewart | 1984 | Anchor and writer of Emmy-winning The Daily Show | |
| Stephanie Szostak | 1994 | Model and star of A Million Little Things, Dinner for Schmucks, and various films and television shows | |
| Luke Thomas | 1978 | Combat sport analyst, CBS Sports | |
| Jill Twiss | 1998 | Emmy Award-winning writer for Last Week with John Oliver; author of several children's books | |
| Michelle Wolf | 2007 | Host of Netflix weekly series The Break with Michelle Wolf; former contributor/writer to The Daily Show; stand-up comedian | |

=== Writers ===
| Name | Year | Notability | Ref. |
|---|---|---|---|
| Tom Angleberger | 1992 | Children's author, known for The Strange Case of Origami Yoda | |
| LaShonda Katrice Barnett | Ph.D. 2012 | Author, professor, playwright, and former radio host | |
| Susan Wise Bauer | M.A. 1996 / Ph.D. 2007 | Author of texts on classical education | |
| Cece Bell | 1992 | Author and illustrator | |
| Alexandra Bracken | 2009 | #1 New York Times bestselling author of children's and young adult novels | |
| Christopher Bram | 1974 | Writer, author of nine novels, including Father of Frankenstein, which was adapted into Academy Award-winning film Gods and Monsters | |
| Michael P Branch | 1985 | Pulitzer Prize-nominated professor and author of nine published books | |
| Bethany Brookshire | 2004 | Science journalist | |
| Jay Busbee | 1990 | Writer, sportswriter and comic book writer; wrote The Face of the River and Jam | |
| James Branch Cabell | 1898 | Regionalist author; favorite of Mark Twain | |
| Landon Carter | 17?? | Author of account of colonial life leading up the American Revolution, The Diary of Colonel Landon | |
| Henri Cole | 1978 | Poet; current poet-in-residence at William & Mary | |
| Maryann Corbett | 1978 | Poet and translator, winner of the Richard Wilbur Award (2014) and the Willis Barnstone Translation Prize (2009) | |
| Jerusalem Demsas | 2017 | Journalist and podcast host | |
| Lisa Desjardins | 1994 | Political journalist for PBS NewsHour | |
| Mike D'Orso | 1975 / M.A. 1981 | Journalist and author | |
| Kathryn Erskine | 1980 | Author of children and YA novels; winner of the 2010 National Book Award for Mockingbird | |
| Shaunti Feldhahn | 1989 | Best-selling author of For Women Only: What You Need to Know About the Inner Lives of Men | |
| Shannon Fisher | 1994 | Opinion writer, talk radio host | |
| Michelle Gable | 1996 | Author of novels A Paris Apartment (2014) and I'll See You in Paris (2016) | |
| Forrest Gander | 1978 | Poet, essayist, novelist and critic | |
| Reid Harrison | 1982 | Screenwriter and television producer who has written for numerous television shows, including The Simpsons and The PJs | |
| Benjamin Hedin | 2001 | Author, university professor; writer and producer of two documentary feature films | |
| Brian Henry | 1991 | Poet, editor, author and professor at the University of Richmond | |
| Brenda Hiatt | 1978 | Author of romantic historical novels | |
| Sheri Holman | 1988 | Television writer and best-selling novelist; author of A Stolen Tongue, The Dress Lodger, and Witches on the Road Tonight | |
| Laura Kamoie | M.A. 1994; Ph.D. 1999 | New York Times, Wall Street Journal, and USA Today best-selling author of historical fiction | |
| Serge Kovaleski | 1984 | Investigative reporter at The New York Times | |
| Trudy Krisher | 1968 | Author | |
| Zach Lowe | M.A. 2003 | Sportswriter and reporter at Stamford Advocate, Grantland, and ESPN; associated with use of advanced metrics in sports | |
| Stephen Marlowe | 1949 | Author of more than 50 novels including detective novels (1950s and 1960s), historical novels, and fictionalized biographies | |
| Syed M. Masood | J.D. 2008 | Author of More Than Just a Pretty Face (2020) and The Bad Muslim Discount (2021) | |
| Anne Marie Pace | 1987 | Children's picture book author and creator of Vampirina | |
| Amanda Petrusich | 2000 | Staff writer at The New Yorker and author | |
| Forrest Pritchard | 1996 | New York Times bestselling author of Gaining Ground (2013) and Growing Tomorrow (2015) | |
| Lewis Burwell Puller, Jr. | 1967 | Lawyer; writer; winner of Pulitzer Prize for autobiography Fortunate Son (1991) | |
| H. Reid | 1947 | Author; photographer; historian | |
| David L. Robbins | 1976 / J.D. 1980 | Writer; wrote War of the Rats, on which the movie Enemy at the Gates is partially based | |
| Laura Sims | 1995 | Author of the book Looker; poet | |
| James Southall Wilson | 1904 / LL.D. 1931 | Author; creator of The Virginia Quarterly Review and William & Mary's Alma Mater | |
| John C. Wright | J.D. 1987 | Author of The Golden Age trilogy and other science fiction and fantasy novels | |
| Andrew Zawacki | 1994 | Poet, critic, editor, and translator | |

=== Other media ===
| Name | Year | Notability | Ref. |
|---|---|---|---|
| Ruth Dicker | 1940 | Landscape painter | |
| Perry Ellis | 1961 | Fashion designer (Perry Ellis International) | |
| Kate Fleming | 1987 | Audio book narrator | |
| Wilford Leach | 1949 | Tony Award winner | |
| David Lasky | 1990 | Alternative cartoonist | |
| William Ivey Long | 1969 | Costume designer; recipient of six Tony Awards | |
| Yuri Lowenthal | 1993 | Voice actor of several anime and video game characters | |
| Carmen Lynch | 1994 | Comedian; has appeared on The Tonight Show Starring Jimmy Fallon, The Late Show with David Letterman, and A Prairie Home Companion | |
| Jamieson Price | 1983 | Voice actor | |
| Lauren Shippen | 2013 | Writer, director, and actor; creator of the podcast The Bright Sessions | |
| Craig Windham | 1971 | NPR personality | |

== Military officers ==
| Name | Year | Notability | Ref. |
|---|---|---|---|
| Admiral Ming Chang | 1955 | First naturalized Asian American naval officer to reach flag rank in the United States military | |
| Colonel George Croghan | 1810 | Soldier who fought at the Battle of Tippecanoe in 1811; recipient of the Congressional Gold Medal | |
| Brigadier General John Hartwell Cocke | 1798 | Led the defense of Richmond, Virginia against British forces in the War of 1812; member of the first board of visitors of the University of Virginia | |
| Lieutenant General Keith Dayton | 1970 | Former director of the Iraq Survey Group as a senior member of the Joint Staff | |
| Major William Gilham | 1852 | Soldier who served in the Confederate Army during the American Civil War and became president of Southern Fertilizing Company in Richmond after the war | |
| Brigadier General Edwin Gray Lee | — | Second cousin of Robert E. Lee and soldier from Virginia who served with the Confederate States Army during the American Civil War | |
| Rear Admiral Cary Grayson | 1898 | Naval surgeon who served aboard presidential yacht Mayflower under Theodore Roosevelt and William Howard Taft, and as White House physician for Woodrow Wilson; chairman of Franklin D. Roosevelt's inaugural committees in 1933 and 1937; and chairman of the American Red Cross | |
| General David D. McKiernan | 1972 | Commanding general of the Third United States Army; Coalition Forces Land Component Command in the Middle East (CENTCOM) | |
| First Lieutenant Lewis Burwell Puller, Jr. | 1967 | Attorney, Pulitzer Prize–winning author, and Marines officer that served in Vietnam; son of renowned Marine Lieutenant General Lewis "Chesty" Puller | |
| Edmund Ruffin | 1812 | Attended only 1810–12; secessionist who fired the first shots of the American Civil War at Fort Sumter, Charleston, South Carolina | |
| Lieutenant General Winfield Scott | 1805 | Longest serving general in U.S. military history (1814–1861); commanded forces in War of 1812, Black Hawk War and Mexican–American War; general-in-chief of Union Army at start of the American Civil War; author of Anaconda Plan | |
| Brigadier General William B. Taliaferro | 1841 | Confederate general in the American Civil War | |
| Colonel Charles Stewart Todd | 1809 | Subaltern and judge-advocate of General James Winchester's division in the War of 1812; in 1813 he was made a captain of infantry, and was an aide to General William Henry Harrison in the Battle of the Thames | |

== Business and technology ==
| Name | Year | Notability | Ref. |
|---|---|---|---|
| Todd Boehly | 1996 | Co-founder, chairman, CEO and controlling member of Eldridge Industries; he is also the co-owner of Premier League football club Chelsea | |
| Beth Comstock | 1982 | VP of Public Relations for General Electric; co-founder of Hulu | |
| Ted Decker | 1985 | CEO and incoming chairman and president of The Home Depot | |
| Lewis Glucksman | 1945 | Noted Wall Street trader; former CEO of Lehman Brothers | |
| Todd Howard | 1993 | Executive producer and game director of Bethesda Softworks | |
| Neil Livingstone | 1968 | Business executive, author, political candidate, television commentator and security and terrorism expert; founder, chairman, and CEO of GlobalOptions Inc | |
| Raymond A. Mason | 1959 | Founder and CEO of investment firm Legg Mason, Inc.; namesake of William & Mary's Mason School of Business | |
| William Temple Thomson Mason | 1803 | Prominent Virginia farmer and businessman | |
| Mark McCormack | 1951 | Sports agency pioneer; founder of International Management Group (IMG); author of bestseller What They Don't Teach You at Harvard Business School | |
| Michael Medline | M.B.A. 1991 | Canadian businessman; president and CEO of Empire Company Limited | |
| Alan B. Miller | 1958 | Founder and CEO of United Health Services, Inc.; namesake of Miller Hall, home of the Mason School of Business | |
| Paul Peters | 2004 | CEO of the Open Access publisher Hindawi (2015–2021) | |
| C. Michael Petters | 1993 | President and CEO of Huntington Ingalls Industries | |
| Joe Plumeri | 1966 | Chairman & CEO of Willis Group Holdings, and owner of the Trenton Thunder; namesake of William & Mary's Plumeri Park | |
| Paul C. Saville | 1977 | President and CEO of NVR, Inc. | |
| Mark Smucker | 1992 | CEO of The J.M. Smucker Company | |
| Pete Snyder | 1994 | CEO of Disruptor Capital, founder of New Media Strategies | |
| Jeffrey Trammell | 1973 | Past president of W&M's Board of Visitors, founded Trammell and Company | |
| Walter J. Zable | 1937 | Cubic Corporation director, chairman of the board, president and CEO from 1951 until his death in 2012; namesake of the school's Walter J. Zable Stadium | |

== Sciences ==
| Name | Year | Notability | Ref. |
|---|---|---|---|
| Lena Clemmons Artz | 1927 | Botanist known for her research on the flora of the Virginia in the mid-20th century | |
| Carole Baldwin | Ph.D. 1992 | Research zoologist, curator of fishes, and the vertebrate zoology department chair at the National Museum of Natural History | |
| David McDowell Brown | 1978 | Astronaut, Navy Flight Surgeon and pilot who died during the Space Shuttle Columbia disaster on February 1, 2003 | |
| Jerry Coyne | 1971 | Biologist known for his work on speciation and his commentary on intelligent design | |
| Vincent T. DeVita | 1957 | Physician and pioneer in oncology; CEO of Yale University's Comprehensive Cancer Institute | |
| Nathan Havill | 1996 | Entomologist and evolutionary biologist noted for work on the phylogeny of Adelgidae | |
| Virginia Holsinger | 1958 | Food scientist whose research was significant in the dairy industry | |
| Suzette Kimball | 1973 | Environmental science and director of the United States Geological Survey | |
| Anne McNeil | 1999 | Chemist at the University of Michigan | |
| George H. Miller | 1967 / M.S. 1969 / Ph.D 1972 | Physicist; former director of Lawrence Livermore National Laboratory | |
| Mohamed Noor | 1992 | Professor of biology and dean of natural sciences at Duke University | |
| William Erwood Old, Jr. | 19?? | Malacologist | |
| Linwood Pendleton | 1985 | Environmental economist; executive director of the Ocean Knowledge Action Network | |
| Richard G. Richels | 1968 | Directs global climate change research at the Electric Power Research Institute | |
| Ellen Stofan | 1983 | Director of the Smithsonian National Air and Space Museum; former chief scientist at NASA (2013–2016) | |
| Charles Tahan | 2000 | Physicist specializing in condensed matter physics and quantum information science and technology | |
| William P. Winfree | M.S. 1975 / Ph.D. 1978 | Experimental physicist; known for his contributions to the field of nondestructive evaluation | |

== Sports ==
The William & Mary Tribe sports teams have participated at Division I level in the NCAA since the school became a members in official conference competition in 1937, although pre-conference interscholastic competition started in 1893. College alumni have played in every major professional sports league in the United States except for the National Hockey League. To honor players of the program in various sports, the William & Mary Athletics Hall of Fame was established in 1969.

=== Baseball ===
| Name | Year | Notability | Ref. |
|---|---|---|---|
| Bill Bray | 2004 | Relief pitcher for the Washington Nationals (2006) and Cincinnati Reds (2006–2012) | |
| David Cripe | 1972 | Third baseman for Kansas City Royals (1978) | |
| Adam Butler | 1995 | Pitcher for Atlanta Braves (1998) | |
| Ben Guez | 2009 | Minor league baseball player | |
| Brendan Harris | 2001 | Infielder for the Chicago Cubs (2004); Montreal Expos (2004); Washington Nationals (2005–06); Cincinnati Reds (2006); Tampa Bay Devil Rays (2007); Minnesota Twins (2007–2010); Baltimore Orioles (2010–present) | |
| Owen Kahn | 1929 | Played a single one-half inning for the Boston Braves (1930) | |
| Bud Metheny | 1938 | Outfielder for the New York Yankees (1943–46); longtime coach at Old Dominion University | |
| Curtis Pride | 1992 | Outfielder for MLB's Los Angeles Angels | |
| Chris Rahl | 2005 | Consensus First Team All-American in 2004; left school after his junior year to pursue a professional career | |
| Vic Raschi | 1941 | Pitcher for the New York Yankees (1946–53), St. Louis Cardinals (1954–55), and Kansas City Athletics (1955); six-time World Series champion (1947, 1949–1953) and one-time American League strikeouts leader (1951) | |
| Chris Ray | 2003 | Relief pitcher and closer for the Baltimore Orioles (2005–07, 2009) | |
| Will Rhymes | 2005 | Director of player development for the Los Angeles Dodgers; former professional baseball player | |
| Mike Smith | 1926 | Left fielder for New York Giants (1926) | |
| Ben Williamson | 2023 | Infielder for the Tampa Bay Rays | |

=== Basketball ===
| Name | Year | Notability | Ref. |
|---|---|---|---|
| Lynn Barry | 1981 | Assistant director of USA women's basketball (1985–96); special advisor to the WNBA (1996–2000) | |
| Bill Chambers | 1953 | Basketball player for the College of William and Mary (1951–53) who set the NCAA all-time single-game record for rebounds (51) | |
| Todd Cauthorn | 1993 | British-American professional player in the British Basketball League during the 1990s and 2000s | |
| Keith Cieplicki | 1985 | Division I basketball head coach; one of Sports Illustrated's "50 Greatest Vermont Sports Figures" | |
| Jeff Cohen | 1961 | All-American basketball player and NBA draft selection for the Chicago Packers | |
| David Cohn | 2018 | American-Israeli basketball player in the Israel Basketball Premier League | |
| Zeb Cope | 2004 | Professional basketball player in France for Entente Orleans 45 | |
| David Cox | 1995 | Head coach of the Rhode Island Rams men's basketball team | |
| Andy Duncan | 1948 | Former NBA basketball player for the Rochester Royals (1948–50) and Boston Celtics (1950–51) | |
| Chet Giermak | 1950 | All-American basketball player in 1950 | |
| Adam Hess | 2004 | Professional basketball player in the Czech Republic's National Basketball League | |
| Tom Jasper | 1971 | William & Mary's second-ever Southern Conference Men's Basketball Player of the Year (1971) | |
| H. Lester Hooker | 19?? | Head basketball coach at the University of Richmond and William & Mary | |
| Laimonas Kisielius | 2008 | Professional Lithuanian player in the Lithuanian Basketball League | |
| Nathan Knight | 2020 | Lou Henson Award winner, CAA Player of the Year and former NBA player (Atlanta Hawks, Minnesota Timberwolves) | |
| John Lowenhaupt | 1977 | Former basketball stand-out who was once named Sports Illustrated's National Player of the Week | |
| Quinn McDowell | 2012 | Former professional basketball player in Australia, the NBA D-League, Spain, and Latvia; as of 2019–20 is a college coach | |
| Jim Moran | 2001 | Former professional basketball player in Spain's Liga ACB | |
| Marcus Thornton | 2015 | First CAA Men's Basketball Player of the Year in school history; drafted 45th overall in the 2015 NBA draft | |
| Brant Weidner | 1983 | Basketball player for the San Antonio Spurs (1983–84) | |
| Andy Van Vliet | 2020 | Belgian basketball player for Bnei Herzliya Basket | |
| Charlie Woollum | 1962 | Most decorated head men's basketball coach in Bucknell University history | |

=== Football ===
| Name | Year | Notability | Ref. |
|---|---|---|---|
| Marvin Bass | 1943 | Head coach for South Carolina Gamecocks (1961–65), NFL assistant coach (1952, 1970–72, 1977–78, 1982–2004) | |
| Bill Bowman | 1954 | Full back for the Detroit Lions (1954, 1956), Pittsburgh Steelers (1957) | |
| Joe Brady | 2013 | Head coach of the Buffalo Bills (2026–present) | |
| Tom Brown | 1942 | End for the Pittsburgh Steelers (1942) | |
| David Caldwell | 2010 | Defensive back for Indianapolis Colts (2012), New York Giants (2013), Hamilton Tiger-Cats (2014–present) | |
| Dennis Cambal | 1972 | Running back for New York Jets (1973) | |
| Lang Campbell | 2004 | Former professional quarterback for the Arizona Rattlers of the Arena Football League (AFL) | |
| John Cannon | 1982 | Defensive end for Tampa Bay Buccaneers (1982–90) | |
| Win Charles | 1926 | Halfback for Dayton Triangles (1928) | |
| Steve Christie | 1989 | Kicker for Tampa Bay Buccaneers (1990–91), Buffalo Bills (1992–2000), San Diego Chargers (2001–03), New York Giants (2004) | |
| Pinball Clemons | 1986 | Running back for Kansas City Chiefs (1987); former record-holding Canadian Football League player; former head coach and now vice-chair of the Toronto Argonauts | |
| Jack Cloud | 1950 | Fullback for the Green Bay Packers (1950–51), Washington Redskins (1952–53); inducted into the College Football Hall of Fame (1990) | |
| Johnny Clowes | 1948 | Guard for Brooklyn Dodgers (1948), Chicago Hornets (1949), New York Yanks (1950–51) | |
| Derek Cox | 2009 | Cornerback for the Jacksonville Jaguars (2009–2012), San Diego Chargers (2013), Baltimore Ravens (2014) | |
| Lou Creekmur | 1950 | Eight-time Pro Bowl offensive tackle and guard for the Detroit Lions (1950–59); inducted into the Pro Football Hall of Fame | |
| Al Crow | 1955 | Defensive tackle for Boston Patriots (1960) | |
| Dan Darragh | 1968 | Quarterback for the Buffalo Bills (1968–70) | |
| Otis Douglas | 1931 | Two-time NFL Championship with the Philadelphia Eagles (1948–49) | |
| Mark Duffner | 1975 | Linebackers coach with the Jacksonville Jaguars (2006–) | |
| Ivan Fears | 1976 | Current football running backs coach for the New England Patriots | |
| Tom Feamster | — | Transferred to Florida State University; defensive end for Baltimore Colts (1956) | |
| Nick Forkovitch | 1945 | Running back for the Brooklyn Dodgers (1948) | |
| Robert Green | 1992 | Running back for the Washington Redskins (1992), Chicago Bears (1993–96), Minnesota Vikings (1997) | |
| Jonathan Grimes | 2011 | Running back for the Jacksonville Jaquars (2012–2013), Houston Texans (2013–) | |
| Isham Hardy | 192? | Guard for Akron Pros (1923), Akron Indians (1926) | |
| Archie Harris | 1987 | Guard for Denver Broncos (1987) | |
| Dan Henning | 1964 | Quarterback for San Diego Chargers (1966); head coach of the Atlanta Falcons (1983–86), San Diego Chargers (1989–91) | |
| George Hughes | 1950 | Guard for the Pittsburgh Steelers (1950–54) | |
| Harvey Johnson | 1943 | Fullback for the New York Yankees (1946–49), New York Yanks (1951); head coach of the Buffalo Bills | |
| Mark Kelso | 1986 | Safety for the Buffalo Bills (1986–93); appeared in four consecutive Super Bowls (1990–93) | |
| David Knight | 1973 | Wide receiver for the New York Jets (1973–77) | |
| John Kreamcheck | 195? | Tackle for the Chicago Bears (1953–55) | |
| Jimmye Laycock | 1970 | William & Mary Tribe football's winningest coach of all time; head coach 1980–2018 | |
| Mike Leach | 2000 | Tight end and long snapper for the Arizona Cardinals | |
| Sean Lissemore | 2010 | Defensive end for the Dallas Cowboys (2010–2012) and the San Diego Chargers (2013–2016); athletic director for St. Mark's School of Texas | |
| Bob Lusk | 1956 | Center for the Detroit Lions (1956) | |
| Arthur Matsu | 1927 | Halfback for the Dayton Triangles (1928) | |
| Sean McDermott | 1998 | Defensive coordinator for the Carolina Panthers (2011–2016); head coach of the Buffalo Bills (2017–2025) | |
| Tom Mikula | 1948 | Running back for the Brooklyn Dodgers (1948) | |
| Denver Mills | 1947 | Linebacker for the Chicago Cardinals (1952) | |
| Ed Mioduszewski | 1953 | Halfback for the Baltimore Colts (1953) | |
| Bill Murray | 2019 | Defensive tackle for the New England Patriots (2019) | |
| Adam O'Connor | 2006 | Professional football player for the champion Hamburg Sea Devils of NFL Europa | |
| Billy Parker | 2004 | Professional American, Canadian and arena football linebacker | |
| Larry Peccatiello | 1958; M.Ed. 1959 | NFL coach (Houston Oilers, Seattle Seahawks, Cincinnati Bengals, Detroit Lions, Washington Redskins) | |
| Jeff Powell | 1986 | Running back for San Diego Chargers (1987) | |
| Vito Ragazzo | 1950 | Head coach of Virginia Military Institute's football team (1966–70) | |
| Ben Raimondi | — | Transferred to Indiana University; running back for New York Yankees (1947) | |
| Buster Ramsey | 1943 | First head coach of the American Football League's Buffalo Bills | |
| Knox Ramsey | 1948 | Guard for L.A. Dons (1948–49), Chicago Cardinals (1950–51), Washington Redskins (1952–53) | |
| Kevin Rogers | 1974 | Minnesota Vikings quarterbacks coach | |
| Jim Ryan | 1979 | Lineman for the Denver Broncos (1979–88); current defensive assistant coach of the Denver Broncos | |
| Ralph Sazio | 1948 | Tackle for the Brooklyn Dodgers (1948); assistant coach, head coach, general manager and team president for the Hamilton Tiger-Cats | |
| Rip Scherer | 1974 | Football coach at the University of Colorado | |
| Darren Sharper | 1997 | Defensive back for the Green Bay Packers (1997–2004), Minnesota Vikings (2005, 2007–08), New Orleans Saints (2009) | |
| Steve Shull | 1980 | Linebacker for Miami Dolphins (1980–82) | |
| Bob Soleau | 1964 | Linebacker for the Pittsburgh Steelers (1964) | |
| Charlie Sumner | 1955 | Safety for the Chicago Bears and Minnesota Vikings; two-time Super Bowl champion as an assistant coach for the Los Angeles/Oakland Raiders (1981, 1984) | |
| Dominique Thompson | 2004 | Wide receiver for the St. Louis Rams (2005) | |
| Tommy Thompson | 1948 | Linebacker/center for Cleveland Browns (1949–53) | |
| Mike Tomlin | 1995 | Former head coach of the Pittsburgh Steelers; second youngest head coach in NFL history to win a Super Bowl | |
| Adrian Tracy | 2010 | 2010 NFL draft selection by the New York Giants | |
| Al Vandeweghe | 1942 | Tight end for the AAFC's Buffalo Bisons (1946) | |
| Jude Waddy | 1998 | Former linebacker for the Green Bay Packers (1998–2002) | |
| Tex Warrington | — | Transferred to Auburn University; center for the Brooklyn Dodgers (1946–48) | |
| B. W. Webb | 2012 | Cornerback for the Dallas Cowboys (2013), Pittsburgh Steelers (2014), Tennessee Titans (2015), and Cincinnati Bengals (2019) | |
| Alan Williams | 1992 | Football coach, Indianapolis Colts | |

=== Soccer ===
| Name | Year | Notability | Ref. |
|---|---|---|---|
| Al Albert | 1969 | One of the all-time winningest head coaches in NCAA Division I men's soccer history | |
| Wade Barrett | 1998 | Major League Soccer defender, Houston Dynamo | |
| Adin Brown | 2000 | Norwegian Premier League soccer goalkeeper, Aalesunds FK; two-time NCAA First Team All-American (1998 and 1999) | |
| Scott Budnick | 1993 | Former Major League Soccer goalkeeper, most recently of the Miami Fusion F.C. | |
| Jill Ellis | 1988 | Head coach of the United States women's national soccer team (2014–2019), winning manager of the 2015 and 2019 FIFA Women's World Cups | |
| Paul Grafer | 1996 | Former professional soccer player, most recently of the Long Island Rough Riders in the United Soccer Leagues Premier Development League | |
| Andrew Hoxie | 2009 | Major League Soccer striker, San Jose Earthquakes | |
| Steve Jolley | 1997 | Major League Soccer defender for New York Red Bulls | |
| Rob Olson | 1982 | Former professional soccer player with Team America of the North American Soccer League | |
| Chris Rodd | — | Transferred to the University of San Francisco; professional soccer player who is currently with Bryne FK in Norway | |
| Khary Stockton | 1993 | Former professional soccer player, most recently of the Richmond Kickers in the United Soccer Leagues Second Division | |

=== Other sports ===
| Name | Year | Notability | Ref. |
|---|---|---|---|
| Elaina Balouris | 2014 | Track and field world championship level competitor | |
| Andy Borodow | — | Canadian Olympic wrestler, Maccabiah champion, Commonwealth champion; transferred after W&M dropped their wrestling program in 1991 | |
| J. D. Gibbs | 1991 | Former NASCAR driver; president of Joe Gibbs Racing; owner of #11 FedEx Toyota Camry | |
| Jim Holdren | 1964 | One of the most successful high school track and field and cross country running coaches in United States high school history | |
| Brian Hyde | 1996 | Track and field athlete; 1996 Olympian in 1,500 meters (4,900 ft) run and American collegiate record holder in the same event (3 minutes 35 seconds) | |
| Fred Kovaleski | 1949 | Tennis player, spy, and businessman | |
| Megan Moulton-Levy | 2008 | Professional tennis player | |
| Josh Sundquist | 2006 | Paralympian, bestselling author and motivational speaker | |
| Michelle Wolf | 2007 | Long jumper whose college career was cut short due to injury; host of Netflix weekly series The Break with Michelle Wolf; former contributor/writer to The Daily Show; stand-up comedian | |

== Miscellaneous ==
| Name | Year | Notability | Ref. |
|---|---|---|---|
| Sarah Brady | 1964 | Pioneer in gun violence prevention; wife of Jim Brady, press secretary to President Ronald Reagan | |
| Marion Moncure Duncan | 1932 | 25th president-general of the Daughters of the American Revolution | |
| Rick Gates | 1994 | Political consultant to the Donald Trump presidential campaign in 2016 | |
| Hugh Haynie | 1950 | Political cartoonist for the Louisville Courier Journal (1958–97) | |
| Randolph Jefferson | 1773 | Younger brother of Thomas Jefferson | |
| William Kelso | M.A. 1964 | Archaeologist specializing in Virginia's colonial period | |
| Henry Lee IV | 1808 | Biographer and historian to Major General Light Horse Harry and Matilda Lee | |
| Lewis Littlepage | 1778 | Diplomat for King Stanisław August Poniatowski of Poland | |
| Sheila Michaels | — | Helped to popularize the honorific "Ms."; civil rights activist with CORE and SNCC; expelled by W&M in part for writing anti-segregationist editorials for the student newspaper | |
| Edward J. Normand | 1992 | Lawyer known for representing Lloyd's of London in the dispute over the extent that its insurance covered the September 11, 2001 attacks on the World Trade Center | |
| Steven Pruitt | 2006 | Named one of the 25 most influential people on the Internet by Time in June 2017; has made over 6 million English Wikipedia edits, more than any other single human editor | |
| Robert Rector | 19?? | Pioneer in social welfare reform; current Senior Fellow at The Heritage Foundation | |
| Leni Sorenson | M.A. 1997, Ph.D. 2005 | Chef and culinary historian; focuses on the lives of Black cooks, with emphasis on the early 1800s and the Colonial period | |
| David Uy | 1993, MBA 1996 | Chinese American advocate, historian, and founding director of the Chinese American Museum in Washington, D.C. | |

== Fictional people ==
| Name | Year | Notability | Ref. |
|---|---|---|---|
| Tracy Atwood | Not specified | Detective in the 2007 film Mr. Brooks | |
| John Dorian | 1990s | Doctor on the television series Scrubs; college roommate of Christopher Turk | |
| Jerry Robinson | Not specified | Orthodontist on the television series The Bob Newhart Show | |
| Alexandra Rover | Not specified | Lead character in the 2008 film Nim's Island | |
| Victoria Savedge | Not specified | Protagonist of Rita Mae Brown's 2001 novel Alma Mater | |
| Christopher Turk | 1990s | Doctor on the television series Scrubs; college roommate of John Dorian | |
