= Feldhahn =

Feldhahn is a German surname meaning 'field cock'. Notable people with the surname include:

- Juanita Feldhahn (born 1973), Australian cyclist
- Nicolas Feldhahn (born 1986), German footballer
- Shaunti Feldhahn, American writer

== See also ==
- Feldbahn
