= Norfolk Collegiate School =

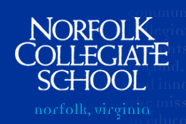

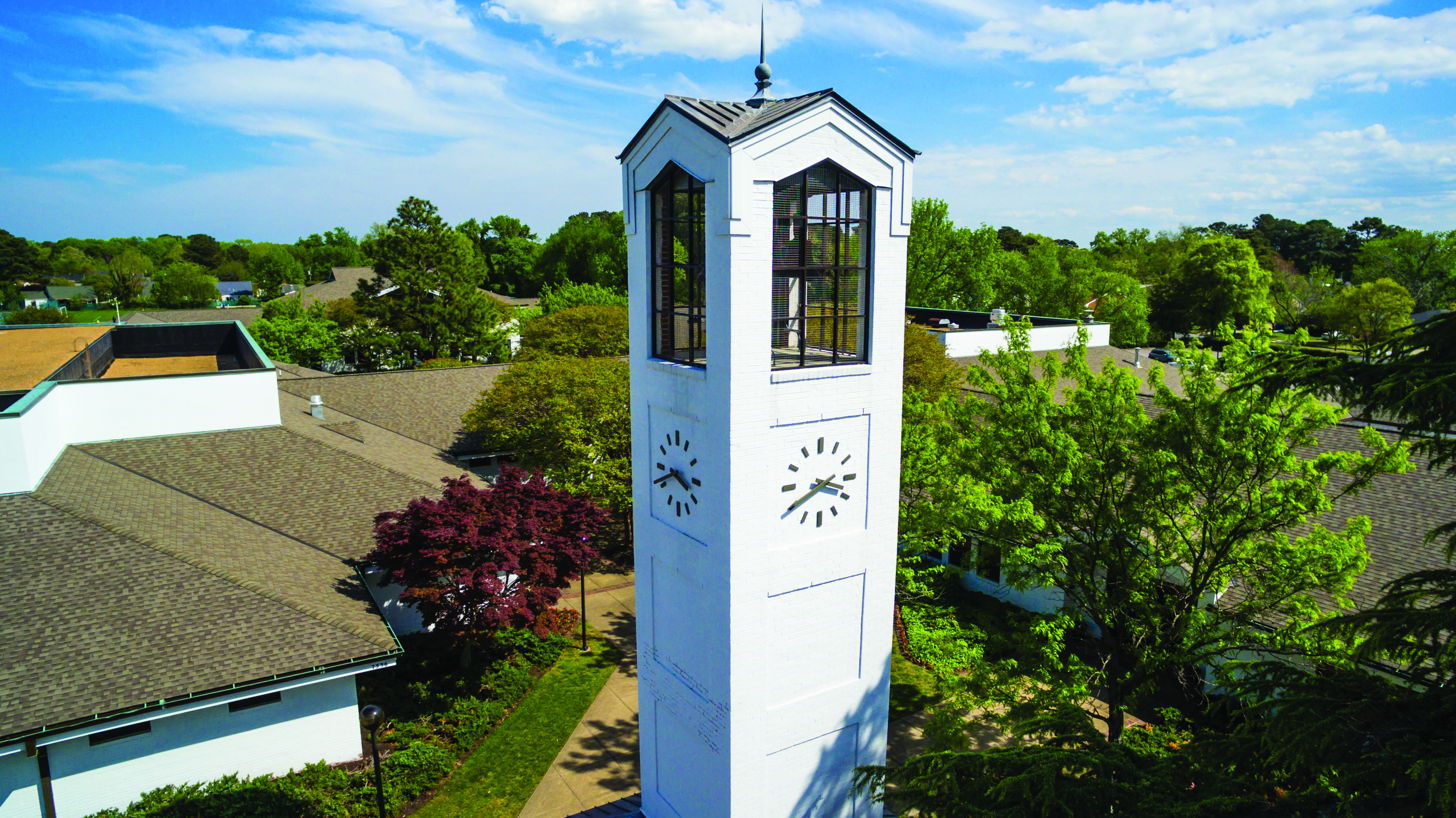
- The Scribner Belltow

Location
- 7336 Granby Street; Norfolk, Virginia 23505; United States; 36°54′41″N 76°16′23″W

Information
- School type: Independent School
- Founded: 1948
- Head of School: Jonathan Day
- Enrollment: 600
- Colors: Blue and White
- Athletics conference: Tidewater Conference of Independent Schools, Virginia Independent Schools Athletic Association
- Mascot: Oaks
- Endowment: $8.3 million
- Website: http://www.norfolkcollegiate.org

Norfolk Collegiate is a coeducational independent day school in Norfolk, Virginia for students in pre-kindergarten through 12th grade. Norfolk Collegiate is accredited by the Virginia Association of Independent Schools (VAIS). It's also a member of the Tidewater Conference of Independent Schools, which includes 10 private schools from the Hampton Roads region of Virginia, as well as a member of the Virginia Independent Schools Athletic Association.

== History ==
Norfolk Collegiate was founded in 1948 as a Carolton Oaks School in Wards Corner section of Norfolk, Virginia. It began as a kindergarten and preschool in a cottage home in Norfolk. By 1963, the school had graduated its first class of seniors, and 10 years later it changed its name to Norfolk Collegiate School to more accurately reflect its college-preparatory mission.

Today, the school is home to 600 students and 100 faculty and staff on two campuses, the middle and upper school (Grades 6-12) at 7336 Granby Street, Norfolk, and the lower school (Pre-K3-Grade 5) at 5429 Tidewater Drive, Norfolk.

The school has several signature programs and learning spaces, such as the lower school's farm-to-table Outdoor Learning Lab, AP Capstone Program, Learning to Evaluate Action Program, the FIRST robotics programs, Design Thinking & Computing, MakerLabs and Summer Internship Program for juniors and seniors.

The middle and upper school is home to the Meredith Center for the Arts, which showcases the school's arts and technology programs and serves as a venue for the Hampton Roads community. It houses a 425-seat theater, communication arts suite, digital arts classrooms, chorus rooms, MakerLab and more.

The latest addition to the school came in September 2015 with the opening of its $2.6 million athletic complex which features two 70x110 yard, competition-sized, pre-lined artificial, lighted turf fields.

== Athletics ==
Norfolk Collegiate's athletic program offers daily physical education for students in kindergarten through grade 12 and focuses on fitness and nutrition. For student-athletes, an additional focus is placed on healthy competition, teamwork, accountability, goal setting and effective communication in team and individual sports.

The athletic program offers more than 50 teams in nearly 20 sports for students in grades 6-12. Students in kindergarten through grade 5 are offered enrichment sports, such as karate, dance, soccer, as well as sport clinics throughout the year. Student-athletes compete in the fall, winter and spring seasons at the middle school, junior varsity and varsity levels.

Collegiate offers the following athletic teams:

- Sailing (co-ed)
- Cross Country and Track (co-ed)
- Tennis (boys and girls)
- Golf (co-ed)
- Basketball (boys and girls)
- Baseball
- Softball
- Wrestling
- Swimming
- Lacrosse (boys and girls)
- Field Hockey
- Soccer (boys and girls)
- Crew
- Cheerleading
- Volleyball

In 2015, the school added a $2.6 million athletic complex becoming the first K-12 school in the Hampton Roads with side-by-side, competition-size turf fields with lights. The 70x110 yard turf fields are pre-lined for soccer, field hockey, women's lacrosse and men's lacrosse. Made of nearly 164,500 square feet of TurfField Classic Slit Film two-inch with an infill mix, the fields also have 6 Musco® lights to allow for night competitions. Bleachers flank the fields and provide seating for 500 spectators, while scoreboards make following game action a breeze. A batting cage offers a designated hitting area for the school's softball and baseball teams.

== Student Services ==
Norfolk Collegiate offers its students myriad opportunities to become involved and to become leaders in the school from student clubs and academics, to the arts and athletics, the opportunities abound for students to become engaged in the life of the school. At the core of the Collegiate experience is integrity, which is guided by the student-led Honor Council. From enrichment programming offered to lower school students to the more than 50+ student-led clubs and sports in the middle and upper school, students may expand their experiences and develop their leadership skills through a variety of avenues.

== Summer Programs ==
Norfolk Collegiate's academic year runs from late August through early June. During the summer, Norfolk Collegiate hosts programs for students, such as Chemistry and college essay writing.

== College Counseling ==
Norfolk Collegiate is a college preparatory school that prepares its students for the world beyond Collegiate by working with each student and his/her parents to find the "right fit" college or university. College counselors guide students through the process from their freshmen year to the day they join the ranks of the more than 3,000 graduates worldwide.

== Notable alumni ==
Some of Norfolk Collegiate's notable alumni include:

1970s

- Don Chapman '72, Native American lead guitarist/vocalist, lead guitarist/vocalist for Firefall's Rick Roberts and Larry Burnett Reunion
- Dr. Camden Wood Selig ’79, Old Dominion University Director of Athletics
- Magnum T. A. (Terry Allen) '77, former NWA United States Heavyweight Champion

1980s

- Andy Protogyrou '80, Norfolk City Councilman, Hampton Roads General District and Juvenile & Domestic Relations Substitute Judge
- Barron Segar '80, chief development officer and executive vice president at UNICEF
- Louise McCleary ’83 - Managing Director of Division III at NCAA
- Ted Mathas '85, chief executive officer of New York Life Insurance Co.
- Marcus Miller ’88, jazz percussionist, bandleader and composer
- Jonathan Pruden '89, CEO TASTE
- David Uy '89, Executive Director, Chinese American Museum, Washington, DC

1990s

- Scott Weinstein '91, co-producer of "The Weekend Update" on Saturday Night Live
- Peter Kay '92, drummer of national tribute band Wayward Sons
- Brian Bress '93, video artist

2000s

- David Krohn '02, baritone, Juilliard-trained opera singer
- Zack Close ’05, executive chef
- Keith Wright '08, professional basketball player
- Jay Jones '06, lawyer, Delegate for the 89th District, Attorney General of Virginia
- Brittany Jewel McPherson '06, screenwriter
- Spencer Tinkham ’11, contemporary sculptor
