= Southern Writers Conference =

The Southern Writers Conference was held at the University of Virginia in 1931 to discuss “The Relation of the Southern Author to His Public.” It was organized by Virginia Quarterly Review editor James Southall Wilson and presided over by Ellen Glasgow and DuBose Heyward. Notable attending writers included Sherwood Anderson, James Branch Cabell, Dubose Heyward, Paul Green, Allen Tate, Caroline Gordon, Donald Davidson, Mary Johnston, James Boyd, Struthers Burt, Josephine Pinckney, and William Faulkner.
