= James Southall Wilson =

American editor (1880–1963)

- Education: College of William & Mary
- Employer: University of Virginia
- Title: Editor of Virginia Quarterly Review
- Term: 6
- Successor: Stringfellow Barr
- Spouse: Julia Tyler

James Southall Wilson (1880–1963) was an author, University of Virginia professor, and founder of the Virginia Quarterly Review. He organized the 1931 Southern Writers Conference. His wife, Julia Tyler, was the granddaughter of President John Tyler and a founder of Kappa Delta sorority. Wilson wrote the College of William & Mary's spirit song, "Our Alma Mater."

Wilson wrote a biography of ornithologist Alexander Wilson in 1906.
