= Virginia Holsinger =

American food scientist

Virginia Harris Holsinger
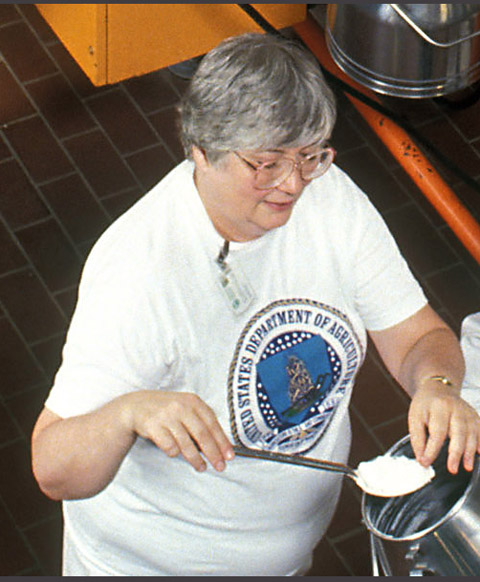
- Virginia Holsinger in an ARS Laboratory (Photo courtesy of USDA Agricultural Research Service)
- Born: March 13, 1937; Washington, D.C., US
- Died: September 4, 2009 (aged 72); Fairfax, Virginia, US
- Education: College of William & Mary (BS); Ohio State University (PhD)
- Known for: Enzymes as food treatments
- Awards: Lifetime Achievement Award for Women in Science & Engineering
- Scientific career
- Fields: Food Science
- Workplaces: United States Department of Agriculture

Virginia H. Holsinger (March 13, 1937 – September 4, 2009) was a food scientist whose research was significant in the dairy industry. Her research on enzymes as dietary supplements and food treatments was critical to the development of Lactaid and Beano.

== Early life and education ==
Holsinger was born in Washington, D.C., on March 13, 1937. In 1958, she graduated from the College of William & Mary with a bachelor's degree in chemistry. Afterwards, she joined the Agricultural Research Service within the U.S. Department of Agriculture (USDA), initially working as an analytical chemist at the Agricultural Research Service Dairy Products Laboratory in Washington, D.C. She later attended the Ohio State University where she completed her doctorate in food science and nutrition in 1980 under the direction of Professor Paul M. T. Hansen. Her dissertation was entitled "A Study of the Rehydration Properties of a Milk Analogue Containing Soy Products and Cheese Whey".

== Scientific career ==
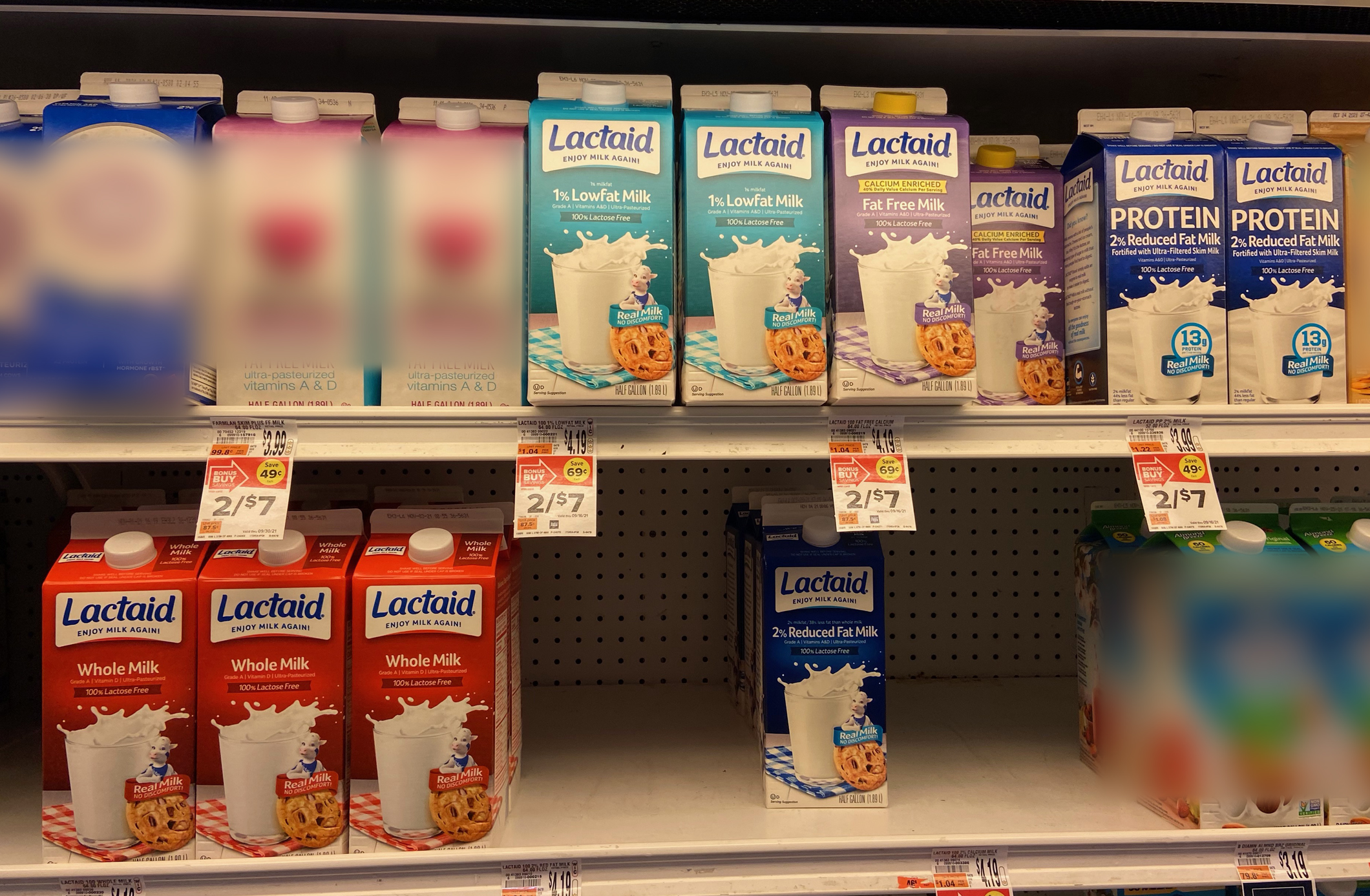
Lactaid brand products on grocery store shelves

Holsinger specialized in dairy products for the duration of her scientific career. She transferred to USDA's Eastern Regional Research Center in Wyndmoor, Pennsylvania, in 1974, at which time she led research programs on the basic science and technology of dairy foods for the duration of her career until her retirement in 1999.

=== Dietary products ===
In the early 1980s, Alan Kligerman, who was one of the owners of a family dairy farm, approached Holsinger about the possibility for developing a milk substitute for people who are lactose intolerant. Lactose intolerance is a common condition worldwide. Holsinger subsequently determined that milk could be treated with a lactase enzyme in order to break down the lactose into simple, easily digestible sugars, in particular, glucose and galactose. For this purpose, Holsinger used a lactase derived from fungi. Most lactose intolerant people could digest milk treated in this way without experiencing the symptoms of lactose intolerance. These findings led to Kligerman's commercialization of the Lactaid brand of lactase-treated dairy products.

Following the success of Lactaid, the U.S. Military approached Holsinger about developing a product designed for soldiers who were lactose intolerant, with the additional requirement that the product be made from dehydrated milk powder. The basis of the additional requirement was that the milk could be reconstituted by soldiers while they were in the field. Holsinger worked with the team that helped her develop Lactaid and successfully developed a lactose free dehydrated milk powder that had long shelf life while retaining good flavor.

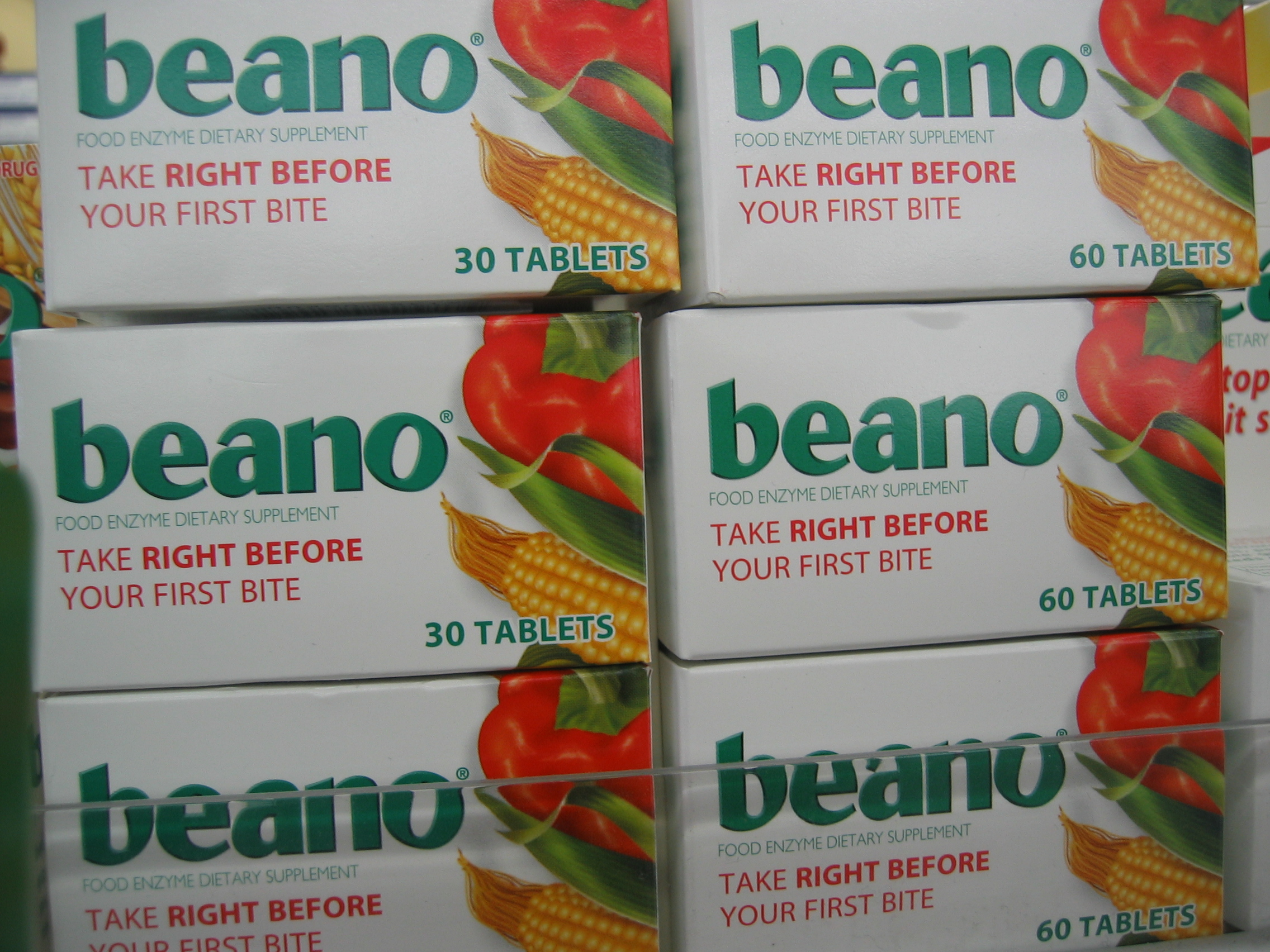
Packages of Beano

Holsinger's conducted fundamental research on the ability of the enzyme α-galactosidase to convert complex sugars into simple sugars. The simple sugars are more easily digested by the human digestive tract. Her findings were put to use by Kligerman's company to develop Beano, which is a digestive aid to prevent formation of human intestinal gas.

Holsinger's work and research was also used to develop reduced-fat mozzarella cheese which was widely adapted in school lunch programs. Holsinger formulated a powder drink mix based on whey and soy drink mix that can be reconstituted with water to provide a milk substitute. This formulation was widely used in emergency relief situations as part of the U.S. Agency for International Development's Food for Peace program.

=== Awards and honors ===
In 1995, Holsinger received the Women in Science and Engineering (WISE) Lifetime Achievement Award, granted by the Agricultural Research Service. The award citation stated that this was "for over 20 years of accomplishment in dairy product research and for aiding the advancement of other women in the fields of science and engineering."

A year after Holsinger's 1999 retirement as the leader of the Dairy Products Research Unit, she was inducted into the Agricultural Research Service's Hall of Fame for lifetime career achievements.

In 1986, Holsinger received the Distinguished Service Award of the American Chemical Society's Division of Agricultural & Food Chemistry. Holsinger was an emeritus member of the American Chemical Society, having been a member of the organization since 1959.

Holsinger and the rest of the team that developed Lactaid received the Food Technology Industrial Achievement Award by the Institute of Food Technologists in 1987 and in 2025 she was posthumously inducted into the National Inventors Hall of Fame.

=== Representative publications ===
Holsinger published more than 100 scientific papers in scholarly journals. Representative examples:

- Holsinger V.H. (1988) Lactose. In: Wong N.P., Jenness R., Keeney M., Marth E.H. (eds) Fundamentals of Dairy Chemistry. Springer, Boston, MA. ISBN 978-1-4615-7050-9 .
- Malin E.L., Basch J.J., Shieh J.J., Sullivan B.C., Holsinger V.H. "Detection of Adulteration of Buttermilk Powder by Gel Electrophoresis", Journal of Dairy Science, 77(8), August 1994, pp. 2199-2206.
- Van Hekken D.L., Tunick M.H., Malin E.L., Holsinger V.H., "Rheology and Melt Characterization of Low-Fat and Full Fat Mozzarella Cheese made from Microfluidized Milk", LWT - Food Science and Technology, 40(1), January 2007, pp. 89-98.

== Death ==
External images
- Portrait of Virginia Holsinger
- “Portrait of Virginia Holsinger", as published in Chemical & Engineering News
- "Portrait of Virginia Holsinger", as shown in the ARS's Hall of Fame

Holsinger died on September 4, 2009, from breast cancer at the age of 72, in Fairfax, Virginia. Holsinger maintained a home in northern Virginia, near where her brother Gordon Holsinger lived, keeping this home even during the time she was working at the USDA facility in Wyndmoor, Pennsylvania. Her brother Gordon Holsinger was her sole survivor at the time of her death.
