= David Uy =

American historian and museum director

David Uy (simplified Chinese: 黄金龙; traditional Chinese: 黄金龍; born 27 February 1971) is a Chinese American advocate, historian, and former founding director of the Chinese American Museum in Washington, D.C. He is Chief Operating Officer of the Friends of the National Museum of Asian Pacific American History and Culture. Formerly, he was the lead principal of the marketing and public relations firm, Brand Bureau, working on nonprofit and corporate strategy and campaign development. In 2018, he and several founding members developed and launched the first and only museum in Washington, DC dedicated to Chinese American history, culture, and achievement.

== Early life and education ==
David Uy was born in Queens, New York City of mixed Chinese and Italian heritage. He spent the majority of his childhood in Virginia Beach, Virginia and attended the Norfolk Collegiate School. He attended the College of William & Mary earning an undergraduate degree in Fine Art and Art History and an MBA in Marketing Strategy.

== Work and recognition ==
Since its beginning, Uy has led the content and creative execution of key exhibits in the DC museum, events, and programming. In 2022, he received the William and Mary Asian Centennial Alumni Award for his work in Asian Pacific American advocacy. He is also on an independent task force to provide input exploring the establishment of the National Museum of Asian Pacific American History and Culture.

On October 13, 2023, he was a co-host with former news anchor Joie Chen, of the Gold Lantern Awards, a celebration of Chinese Americans accomplishments, leadership, and service held at the John F. Kennedy Center for the Performing Arts.
