= Wes Swing =

American singer-songwriter

- Born: Wesley James Swing; June 2, 1982 (age 44); Fairfax, Virginia, United States
- Origin: Charlottesville, Virginia, United States
- Genres: Rock, Folk, Chamber pop
- Occupation: Musician
- Years active: 2008 – present
- Label: ShyBaby Records
- Website: wesswing.com

Wes Swing (born June 2, 1982, in Virginia) is a singer-songwriter based in Charlottesville, Virginia. His first album, Through a Fogged Glass was released in early 2011.

== History ==
Wes Swing was born in Fairfax, Virginia, and lived there through high school. At age 4, he began to play the violin, and was performing in orchestras in the second grade. After dabbling with rock in high school, he returned to classical music studies, especially the cello, at the College of William and Mary, while pursuing a major in Latin. Upon graduation he briefly moved to Boston, where he completed a piece for eight cellos. He found work as a Latin teacher in Charlottesville, but soon decided to leave teaching to focus on performing live music and recording his first album.

He established himself locally from 2006 onward through performances at smaller venues like the former Gravity Lounge and Nelson County's Rapunzel's. Meanwhile, he recorded tracks for Through a Fogged Glass at his home, at the time a small cabin in Nelson County. In 2008 he began recording at Greenwood Studios, allowing more polished results which quickly bore fruit when he won acclaim as the 2008 winner of the First Amendment Writes songwriting competition. He began collaborating with several other locally known artists, including Devon Sproule who provided backing vocals for several of Swing's tracks, and Brian Caputo on drums. In January 2011, Through a Fogged Glass was released; a tour in support of the album is forthcoming, with dates to be announced on the west coast of the US and in Germany.

== Through a Fogged Glass ==
Swing's first album has been described as "highbrow pop", reminiscent of Radiohead. Cello and violin feature prominently alongside guitar and drums. The lyrics have a "strong literary component", with poetic influences. Two tracks, "In a Station of the Metro" and "All Other Love", are (respectively) Ezra Pound and T.S. Eliot poems set to music. In general, both the music and lyrics have the sparse repetition characteristic of Swing's minimalist influences, while making use of more modern pop instrumentation and production techniques.

== And The Heart ==
And The Heart (2017), Swing's second full-length album, traces its origin to California, Texas and Washington, D.C. While composing in San Francisco, Swing struggled to overcome a wrist injury, before reconnecting with producer Paul Curreri. The formation of Swing’s second album occurred after the artist struggled with a hiatus from music. Combating a wrist injury that conflicted with his cello playing and a weighty spell of depression, Wes Swing at one time found himself disengaged with his musical calling. Swing crafted And the Heart in 2014 and 2015. As his friendliness with music reformed, another partnership opened up in Swing’s life. Swing teamed up with old friend and guitar champion Paul Curreri, who led production for And the Heart. Curreri had suffered a recent wrist and throat injury that halted his performing career, forcing him to consider production instead. In addition to performances from Swing and Curreri, And The Heart features performances by Devon Sproule, Brian Caputo and Jeff Gregerson.

== Discography ==
- Through a Fogged Glass (2011) ShyBaby Records – ASIN: (B004IARNK8)
- "And the Heart" (2017) - ASIN: (B071HJGC91)
