= Our Alma Mater =

"Our Alma Mater" is the alma mater of The College of William & Mary. It was written by James Southall Wilson, a William & Mary alumnus from the class of 1904. Usually, only the first and fourth verses are sung. The song is set to the tune of Annie Lisle, which is used in the alma mater songs of many other colleges, most notably Cornell University.

== Lyrics ==
Hark the students' voices swelling,
Strong and true and clear,
Alma Mater's love they're telling,
Ringing far and near.

'Chorus:'
William and Mary loved of old,
Hark upon the gale,
Hear the thunder of our chorus,
Alma Mater hail!

Iron shod or golden sandaled,
Shall the years go by,
Still our hearts shall weave about thee,
Love that cannot die.

'Chorus'

All thy sons are faithful to thee,
Through their college days,
Singing loud from hearts that love thee,
Alma Mater's praise.

'Chorus'

God, our Father, hear our voices,
Listen to our cry,
Bless the College of our fathers,^{1}
Let her never die.

== Notes ==
- ^1 The line "Bless the College of our boyhood" in the Alma Mater was changed to "Bless the College of our fathers" in the 1928–1929 student handbook. Additionally, there were discussions and contests to change the Alma Mater in 1941 and circa 1959.
