= Shaunti Feldhahn =

American author

- Education: College of William & Mary; Harvard University
- Occupations: Author, speaker
- Writing career
- Language: English
- Subject: Christian non-fiction
- Website: shaunti.com

Shaunti Feldhahn is the author of the Christian self-help books For Women Only and For Men Only, which have sold more than 2 million copies in 23 languages worldwide since 1998.

== Personal life ==
Shaunti Feldhahn graduated from the College of William & Mary with a bachelor’s degree in government and economics. Feldhahn also graduated from Harvard University with a master's degree in public policy. She is married to Jeff Feldhahn, who also attended Harvard University with a degree in law. She is known for her research on both personal, home and work relationships. She has written several books while co-authoring many with her husband. Her books have sold over 2 million copies and are written in many languages. Shaunti is a regular guest, with her husband, on Focus on the Family and several other medias. They have two adult children and currently reside in Atlanta, Georgia.
