= Abrams Books =

American publisher of books and stationery

- Parent company: Média-Participations
- Founded: 1949
- Founder: Harry N. Abrams
- Country of origin: United States
- Headquarters location: New York City
- Distribution: Hachette Client Services
- Key people: Mary McAveney (President; CEO)
- Publication types: Books, stationery
- Nonfiction topics: Art, photography, cooking, craft, comics, interior design, garden design, entertainment, fashion, popular culture
- Imprints: Abrams Books, Abrams Appleseed, Abrams Books for Young Readers, Abrams ComicArts, Abrams Image, Abrams Noterie, Abrams Press, Amulet Books, Amulet Paperbacks, The Overlook Press
- Official website: www.abramsbooks.com

Abrams, formerly Harry N. Abrams, Inc. (HNA), is an American publisher of novels, art and illustrated books, children's books, and stationery.

The enterprise is a subsidiary of the French publisher Média-Participations. Run by president and CEO Mary McAveney, Abrams publishes and distributes approximately 250 titles annually and has more than 3,000 titles in print.

Abrams also distributes publications for the Victoria and Albert Museum, Tate, Vendome Press (in North America), Booth Clibborn Editions, SelfMadeHero, MoMA Children's Books, and 5 Continents.

== History ==
Founded by Harry N. Abrams in 1949, Abrams was the first company in the United States to specialize in the creation and distribution of art books. Times Mirror Company acquired the company in 1966 and Harry Abrams retired in 1977. For many years, the company was under the direction of Paul Gottlieb (publisher) until January 2001, eighteen months before his death. Abrams was acquired by La Martinière Groupe in 1997. La Martinière was acquired by Média-Participations in 2018.

In 2018, Abrams acquired The Overlook Press. In 2020, Abrams acquired Cameron + Company. Abrams acquired Taunton Press from Active Interest Media in May 2024.

== Imprints ==
=== Abrams Books ===
Abrams publishes illustrated books on the subjects of art, photography, performing arts, fashion, interior design, and nature and science. Titles published by Abrams include The Art of Walt Disney, Earth from Above, I'm a Born Liar: A Fellini Lexicon, Louis Vuitton: The Birth of Modern Luxury, The Diary of Frida Kahlo, Yoshitomo Nara: Nobody's Fool, The Wes Anderson Collection, The Selby Is in Your Place, Abrams Discoveries, and Vanity Fair 100 Years (about the two U.S. magazines: 1913-1936 and from 1983 onward).

=== Abrams Appleseed ===
Founded in 2012, Abrams Appleseed publishes board books, novelty books, and picture books for children up to age 5. The imprint's list of titles includes Alphablocks, Hippopposites, Pantone: Color, In My Heart, and the Mini Myths series.

=== Abrams Books for Young Readers ===
Abrams Books for Young Readers publishes picture books and illustrated nonfiction for preschool through middle-grade readers. The imprint's list of titles includes Library Mouse, Rosie Revere, Engineer, I Am Yoga, Animalia, Babar's Museum of Art, Separate Is Never Equal, Maritcha, and 365 Penguins.

=== Abrams ComicArts ===
Abrams ComicArts was founded in 2009 under the editorial direction of Charles Kochman and publishes graphic novels and illustrated books about the creators and the history of comics art, animation, and cartoons. Its titles include Mom's Cancer, Kirby: King of Comics, My Friend Dahmer, The Simpsons Futurama Crossover Crisis, R. Crumb's Heroes of Blues, Jazz & Country, and The Art of Rube Goldberg. In the 2010s, it also began publishing volumes compiling reproduction of vintage trading card series for franchises such as Star Trek. In 2024, the imprint became a full division of the company and also began licensing manga and other international comic books.

==== Kana ====
Kana is a manga and French comics imprint launched in 2024 to focus on "more emotionally mature subjects" and genres not usually suitable for children. It shares its name and logo with the French imprint belonging to neighbor company Dargaud. The imprint also publishes the manhua Blades of the Guardians.

=== Abrams Image ===
Abrams Image was launched in 2006 and publishes illustrated and non-illustrated books on music, humor, fashion, and popular culture. The imprint's titles include Plato and a Platypus Walk Into a Bar, Tim Gunn: A Guide to Quality, Taste & Style, Understand Rap, CBGB & OMFUG, The Steampunk Bible, Paris Street Style, Sh*tty Mom, and Cupcakes and Cashmere.

=== Abrams Noterie ===
Abrams Noterie is a gift and stationery imprint that collaborates with authors, artists, and brands to make paper goods. Recent publications include Paris Street Style, The Kings County Distillery: Whiskey Notes, Hyperbole and a Half, Daily Dishonesty, and The Forest Feast gift and stationery collections.

=== Abrams Press ===
Abrams Press publishes narrative non-fiction works relating to arts and culture, food, style, design, history, current events, science, technology, memoir, and biography. Titles include Grocery: The Buying and Selling of Food in America, Unprotected by Billy Porter, Soulless: The Case Against R. Kelly by Jim DeRogatis, The Sopranos Sessions by Matt Zoller Seitz and Alan Sepinwall.

=== Amulet Books ===
Amulet Books publishes novels, graphic novels, and nonfiction for young adults and middle-grade readers. The imprint has published many bestselling and award-winning books, including Jeff Kinney's Diary of a Wimpy Kid series, Heart of a Samurai, Cece Bell's El Deafo, Tom Angleberger's Origami Yoda series, and Michael Buckley's Sisters Grimm and NERDS series.

=== Amulet Paperbacks ===
Amulet Paperbacks publishes original titles as well as reprints. Books published by Amulet Paperbacks include Lauren Myracle's Internet Girls series, A. G. Howard's Splintered series, Jesse Andrews's Me and Earl and the Dying Girl, and Jonathan Auxier's The Night Gardener.

== Defunct imprints ==
=== Stewart, Tabori & Chang ===
Stewart, Tabori & Chang (ST&C), a publisher of cookbooks and craft titles, was purchased by Abrams in the late 1990s. In what CEO Michael Jacobs described in 2016 as a "unification strategy", all reprinted ST&C titles will appear under Abrams' other existing imprints. In addition, a new corporate logo was rolled out simultaneously.
