= IPS Supported Employment =

For people who have a severe mental illness

IPS Supported Employment is an evidence-based approach to supported employment for people who have a mental illness. IPS stands for Individual Placement and Support. IPS supports people in their efforts to achieve steady, meaningful employment in mainstream competitive jobs, either part-time or full-time. This stands in contrast to other vocational rehabilitation approaches that employ people in sheltered workshops and other set-aside jobs.

IPS has been extensively researched and proven to be effective compared to standard employment services.

== Principles ==
IPS is based on eight principles. Mental health agencies that implement IPS aim to follow these principles in delivering vocational services.

	IPS Principles
1	Every person with severe mental illness who wants to work is eligible for IPS supported employment.
2	Employment services are integrated with mental health treatment services.
3	Competitive employment is the goal.
4	Personalized benefits counseling is provided.
5	The job search starts soon after a person expresses interest in working.
6	Employment specialists systematically develop relationships with employers based upon their client's preferences.
7	Job supports are continuous.
8	Client preferences are honored.

The implementation of these principles can be assessed by using a fidelity scale and an accompanying manual that have been developed specifically for IPS.

== Research ==
IPS was first studied in a randomized controlled trial in 1996. Between 1996 and 2011, IPS was evaluated in 15 randomized controlled trials. On average, 60% of research participants get a competitive job during the follow-up period when they receive IPS, whereas 24% of participants get a competitive job when receiving other vocational services. These results, along with data from non-research implementations of IPS, have resulted in the establishment of benchmark employment rates for IPS programs. This research has established IPS as an evidence-based practice in community psychiatry.

In addition to testing the comparative effectiveness of IPS, researchers have conducted implementation research on IPS, research on predictors of outcome (who gets jobs and why), barriers to employment for people who have a serious mental illness, and a number of other related areas.

== What happens in IPS ==
IPS services are typically delivered by supported employment teams that operate within community mental health agencies. These teams work with their agency's clinical staff to coordinate services. When a client at the agency expresses interest in working, that client is referred to an employment specialist on the IPS team for an initial meeting. The employment specialist works with the client to learn about his or her goals and preferences and provides information about how IPS works. When someone chooses to enroll in IPS, that person and the employment specialist make a plan together and begin to look for regular jobs in the community as soon as the client expresses interest in doing so. Employment specialists are trained to provide people with support, coaching, resume development, interview training, and on-the-job support. Employment specialists are also trained to do job development; a process in which employment specialists build relationships with employers in businesses that have jobs that are consistent with client preferences.

In IPS, the client's preferences are central. The client decides whether or not employers and potential employers know about her/his mental illness and whether or not the employment specialist will talk to employer/s on his or her behalf. The client also decides which jobs to apply for and how much he or she wants to work. The decision about how much to work is often influenced by a desire to transition to a working life while minimizing the risk of being both out of work and without disability benefits. Part of the employment specialist's job is to connect people with benefits counseling so that they can make informed decisions in this area.

People who try IPS often get a number of jobs before finding one that is a good fit. In IPS there is an orientation towards moving between jobs as part of a normal process. This process aims at convergence towards stable employment and toward the client's personal recovery goals.

== Access to IPS Services ==
As of 2009 only 2.1% of U.S. mental health clients had access to evidence-based vocational services. Mental health agencies often face financing challenges in implementing IPS due to the absence of clear reimbursement policies for vocational services in psychiatry. Nonetheless, as of 2011, IPS was offered by mental health agencies in at least 13 states. Because there is no national directory of IPS providers, people interested in access to these services must ask local mental health services providers about their vocational services in order to find out whether or not evidence-based vocational services are available.

== Dissemination ==
The Johnson & Johnson – Dartmouth Community Mental Health Program was created to further the dissemination of IPS by providing a structure for supporting implementations of IPS at the state level. In 2001, the Dartmouth Psychiatric Research Center launched this program with philanthropic support from Johnson & Johnson Corporate Contributions. This program has resulted in the formation of a national learning collaborative that supports the implementation of IPS services in everyday (i.e., non-research) settings. Membership in this collaborative is widespread. As of 2011, 13 states containing 130 participating mental health agencies were part of the collaborative. States that enter the learning collaborative receive four years of seed funding to support initial implementation efforts. After this first phase, states and their participating agencies stay involved by sharing outcome and service data, participating in research projects, and by continuing statewide implementation efforts.

== IPS outside of the United States ==
Although IPS was developed in the United States, research literature suggests a wider interest in IPS and suggests that the intervention is effective across a range of cultures and policy environments. Randomized trials of IPS have been conducted in Canada, throughout the EU, including in UK, Australia, The Netherlands, Switzerland, and Hong Kong.

In the UK, Centre for Mental Health has developed a Centres of Excellence project based on the Dartmouth Medical School scheme. The Centres will act as exemplars of how Individual Placement and Support (IPS) can be implemented in localities across England. The Centre for Homelessness Impact is running the first trial for people experiencing homelessness. Funded by the Ministry of Housing Communities and Local Government (MHCLG), the trial will compare outcomes to 460 people referred to the service over an 18-month period with results expected in 2027.
