= Customized employment =

Employment personalization method

Customized employment (CE) is a way of personalizing the employment relationship between a candidate and an employer in order to meet the needs of both. It applies in particular to employees with disabilities. The individual employee's skills, interests and needs are identified in a process of "discovery", and job content and environment are tailored to these in a process of negotiation.

== Participation in community ==
Customized employment aims to provide everyone with an equal opportunity to participate in community life. Community inclusion of individuals with disabilities requires support and advocacy from local businesses for concepts like customized employment. Molina, Leslie and Demchak, MaryAnn Demchak from Rural Special Education Quarterly says "If people with intellectual disability are to become truly self-determined, they must be allowed to express choice throughout their lives, including employment. Expectations for competitive employment tend to be low for this population, if considered at all". Through the customized employment concept businesses can universally accept the practice that recognizes the power of community relationships with persons with disabilities who have been left out of the equation of community.

== Description ==
Katherine Inge from Virginia Commonwealth University Rehabilitation Research and Training Center says "The term, customized employment, is attributed to a speech that Secretary of Labor, Elaine Chao, made upon being confirmed by the U.S. Senate in 2001. In that speech, Ms. Chao referred to customization as a trend in the labor market. Within 6 months of her speech, the Office of Disability Employment Policy, a new office within the U.S. Department of Labor, put forth in the Federal Register, a major initiative from the U.S. Department of Labor. They termed that initiative "customized employment". The definition of customized employment that was published in the Federal Register is as follows: People with disabilities find customized employment to be successful way of gaining purposeful work with real wages. Todd Citron et al. says "A person with a disability who needs supports often begins with a negative label and stands at risk of rejection, segregation, isolation and limited adult opportunities. While in our culture the notion of freedom is strongly tied to personal power, control and influence, many individuals with disabilities have been historically denied access to the opportunities for choice and decision-making necessary to experience becoming successful in what they wish to do with their lives". Customized employment utilizes a process of discovery to uncover an individual's strengths, weaknesses, interests, task contributions, and conditions of employment to create meaningful work and a customized fit. Rather than looking at work opportunities driven by the market, customized employment practices create employment that fulfills both the applicant with disabilities and the employer's needs.

=== Discovery ===
Discovery is a key component of customized employment. this is a process of identifying individual's skills and interests through interviews, observations, and conversations. Karen L. Heath et al., from Center for Human Development says "The Discovery process is both open and formal; it is time-limited; and it is not concerned with predicting the future. Rather, it is focused on employment that matches who the individual is now: one potential match is self-employment. While self-employment is gaining credibility as a viable employment option for individuals with disabilities, self-employment is not for everyone". Even though self-employment for individuals with disabilities is less common, it allows individuals to receive assistance in creating of independently owned small business that are typically under five employees. However, there has been some debate regarding CE and its relationship to supported employment. Katherine J. Inge from Virginia University says "Customized employment does not include group placements or sub-minimum wage positions that have unfortunately continued under supported employment services. However, since there are no formal regulations regarding customized employment implementation, the strategy faces the same pitfalls that have limited supported employment implementation. Hours worked, and wages earned will be issues as providers negotiate with employers to customize jobs for individuals with significant disabilities". There is talk amongst some authors that individuals with disabilities are being placed in jobs that are driven by the local labor market rather than negotiated positions based on individual's preferences and choice.

== Benefits ==
Individuals, as well as companies, stand to benefit from customized employment. Customized employment concept provides the business with reliable and dependable employees, it reduces recruitment and hiring process, it matches job seekers with specific employment needs, increases employee retention, helps the business to attract broader customer base, enhance diversity, and increase tax benefits. Paulo dos Santos Rodrigues et al. from Brazilian Academy of Sciences say "One U.S. study reports that employers express a high level of satisfaction when they "customize" job tasks for specific individual job candidates. Employers who hired individuals with significant disabilities through a customized employment process, when interviewed about their experience, identified distinct advantageous results such as increased sales revenue, improved operations, and higher customer satisfaction". Customized employment works in a way that it starts with the person and engages employers through based negotiation disclosing benefits that hiring a specific individual will have for both parties. Cary Griffin et al. from Griffin-Hammis Associates, LLC say "Most supermarkets include a Union butcher shop, a produce department, an Information Technology department, Clerical, shipping and receiving, and management departments. All these operations employ people, therefore bagging groceries should be only one possibly out of a hundred options explored through creative instruction, job carving, and interest-based job negotiations". CE takes form in job carving, job sharing, and task reassignment which will be discussed below.

Tammy Jorgensen Smith et al. from Department of Rehabilitation and Mental Health Counseling, University of South Florida say "An example of a person who may benefit from discovery is an individual with autism. Autism spectrum disorder (ASD) is a range of complex neurodevelopmental disorders, characterized by social impairments, communication difficulties, and restricted, repetitive, and stereotyped patterns of behavior (NINDS, 2014). Persons with autism may be resistant to change and may not be comfortable in offices or other unfamiliar settings. Sensitivity to stimuli may further this discomfort. Additionally, many people who have autism have issues with communication and some have limited or no speech. These characteristics may contribute to difficulties with traditional employment strategies, but do not indicate that the person does not have talents that can be translated into a work setting. Discovery is able to uncover these talents". In Australia, the Centre for Disability Employment Research and Practice (CDERP) have evolved Discovery to reflect the capacity-building element consistent with the objectives of the National Disability Insurance Scheme (NDIS). This has evolved out of practice with the CDERP Work First employment service that supports practice-based evidence and technical training of provider staff. Dr Peter Smith from CDERP has developed a Customised Employment Quality Assurance Framework (CEQAF)to address the issue of organizational fidelity and provide service providers, funders and participants with a measure that supports quality service delivery supported by robust provider systems. Within this quality framework is ACRE certified curriculum training in Customised Employment for employment staff, the CEOFECT provider audit tool and implementation guide and the Discovery Experience and Reflection Scale (DERS) that supports participant feedback and co-design of service delivery.

== Types ==
Sometimes customized jobs do not exist in complete job descriptions, but are created through initiatives like job carving, job creation, the development of a business-within-a-business, resource ownership, or a self-employment opportunity. Job carving happens when individuals analyze duties performed in given jobs and identify specific tasks within those existing positions that individuals with disabilities can accomplish. Jobs carved for individuals may be formed either by editing one existing job or by mixing tasks from multiple jobs to create new positions. In whichever way the process is completed, job carving is a means of focusing on individuals' abilities, skills, and talents they bring to potential employers.

For example: Erick is looking to work in the fields of journalism and advertising. He is a great storywriter and a salesman. He uses one finger to type on a computer keyboard, and he types 20 words per minute. Journalists for a local newspaper are expected to write three stories per week, he would only be able to complete one story a week. The newspaper happens to also have an advertising sales need. Erick cannot communicate effectively on the telephone, but he shows talent in courting the business of advertisers through electronic mail. The local newspaper decides to hire Erick. They use his abilities as both a storywriter and a salesman. This happens by giving Erick the tasks of researching, developing, and composing one feature story a week and successfully soliciting advertisers.

Job creation happens when certain employers' needs are matched with the skills of job seekers. Developing new jobs can be through the process of job carving or by coming up with totally new job descriptions. In the latter case, individuals' unique assists are marketed to businesses. For example: Jane finds a local small business uses paper files to keep track of sales and inventory. The owner of the business has no employees and is solely running the daily operations of the establishment. Because their sales are increasing, keeping account of transactions and items on paper has proven extremely difficult. Through discussing her abilities and talents pertaining to computers and business management, Jane markets herself to the business owner. In turn, the owner decides to create a position for Jane. In this new position, Jane is responsible for developing, implementing, and maintaining a computerized system dedicated to recording sales and inventory.

Tim Riesen et al. from Department of Special Education and Rehabilitation say "Targett, Young, Revell, Williams, and Wehman (2007) described how youth in transition used One Stop Career Centers to support customized career development. The authors explained how students used the resources from centers to obtain employment. These resources included career club curricula, mentoring programs, and internships. In addition, they described how students had access to CE resource staff who provided individualized representation and negotiation with employers. Individuals with disabilities realized early on that Customized Employment is real employment with real pay. CE encouraged students with disabilities to work and realize that employment is essential to successful adult transition. However, Christopher Rogers et al. from Institute on Community Integration, University of Minnesota say, "Current school-to-career transition practices are not leading to sufficient levels of competitive employment and post-secondary education outcomes for youth and young adults with significant disabilities despite progressive mandates and policy improvements in federal and state secondary and post-secondary education, vocational rehabilitation, and workforce development services". When examined more closely, however, the studies showed that out of school youth had a similar rate of employment when compared to subgroup of students still attending high school. Pam Targett et al. say "James is a pleasant young man with a learning disability who attended special education and general education classes. During his freshman year, James learned about the local One Stop's summer youth program and was encouraged to participate by school personnel. Later that year, he enrolled in the summer work program. This program provides eligible youth with 3 weeks of employment training followed by 149 hours of paid work experience. Throughout his remaining years in high school. James attended workshops and training at the One Stop on various work-related topics and independent living issues. He also continued to participate in the summer youth program. One summer he was advised to participate in vocational courses at the local technical center to further develop his work skills. When James graduated from high school with a general diploma, he had employment experience from the summer youth programs, and certificates for completing courses in cabinetmaking. building maintenance, and occupational safety and health from the technical center. Now he was ready to pursue full-time work".

== Implementation ==
CE has proven to be a reliable employment option for individuals with disabilities; however, to implement customized employment solutions, service providers must expand capabilities that they may not have. Jennifer Harvey et al., from Deloitte Consulting, LLP says "CE consists of four process components: Discovery; Job Search Planning; Job Development and Negotiation; and Post-Employment Support. Typically, the employment specialist leads the individual and the CE support team through the first component, Discovery, to determine the individual's interests, skills, and preferences related to potential employment. That information is used to develop a plan, determine a list of potential employers, and conduct an analysis of benefits during the Job Search Planning component. Once a potential employer is identified, the individual and the employer, in the third component, negotiate 1) a customized job, 2) the provision of supports, and 3) the terms of employment that will meet the needs of the individual and the employer. In the case of self-employment, the individual and the agency providing CE services, construct a customized self-employment situation, such as a small business, negotiate the provision of supports to help make the business a success, and tailor the business operations to meet the need of the individual" (Harvey, Jennifer et al., Understanding the competencies needed to customize jobs: A competency model for customized employment." Journal of Vocational Rehabilitation 38, no. 2: 77-89.) Business that implement customized employment will be hiring individuals with skills outside of traditional employment and likely provide better service and broader opportunities to their clients. Michelle Ouimette, and Linda Rammler from Journal of Vocational Rehabilitation say "Successful opportunities and innovations include the "right kind" of social enterprise, entrepreneurship through self-employment and micro-enterprises and other entrepreneurial models". Leaders on all levels are treating employment as a priority since it has an impact in the long run on money and employment opportunities.

== Disclosure issues ==
Disclosing one's disability may be a concern for people with disabilities and well as organizations who assist them when looking for a job. Katherine J. Inge and Pam Targett from Virginia Commonwealth University say "Access to an accommodation in the work place is often dependent on a person's disclosure of disability related needs. Individuals with visible or hidden disabilities, who know that they will need work-related accommodations including an individualized job description, should plan to disclose. If an accommodation is needed, the job seeker with his/her employment specialist must plan how and when to tell potential employers about the disability and be prepared to discuss support needs" (Inge Katherine and Pam Targett, Journal of Vocational Rehabilitation 28, no. 2: 129-132). Disclosure is also important because an individual with disability may need to leave work several times a week for medical appointments and if the employer is unaware of the employee's disability they may have a different attitude towards employee's performance.

== See also ==
- Supported employment
