= Cece Bell =

American author and illustrator

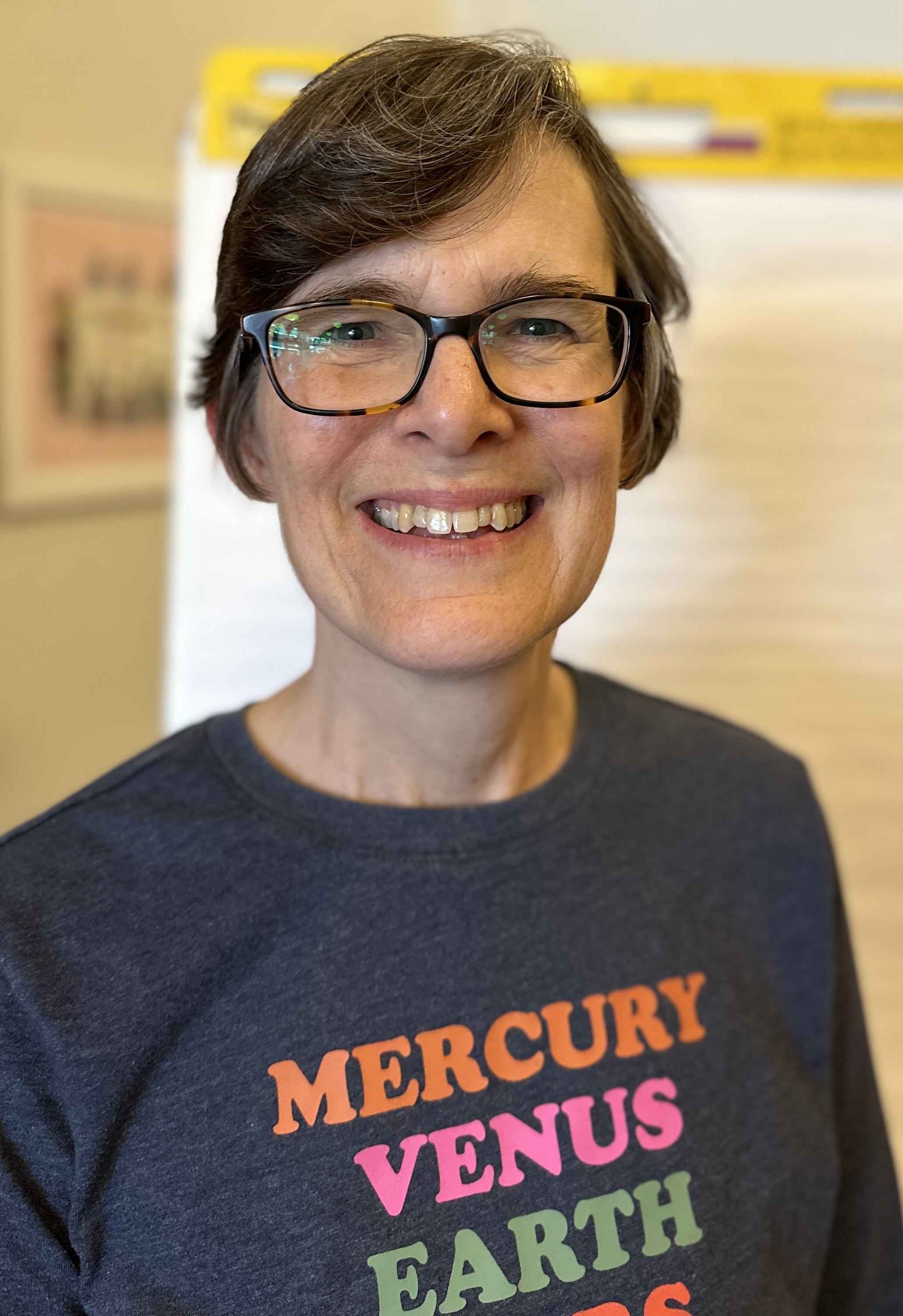
- Bell in 2024
- Born: December 26, 1970 (age 55); Richmond, Virginia, U.S.
- Education: Paier College of Art
- Occupations: Writer, cartoonist, illustrator
- Spouse: Tom Angleberger
- Children: 2
- Writing career
- Years active: 1991–present
- Genre: Children's literature
- Website: cecebell.com

Cecelia Carolina Bell (born December 26, 1970, in Richmond, Virginia) is an American author, cartoonist, and illustrator. Most well known for her graphic novel El Deafo, Bell's work has appeared in The Atlantic, Vegetarian Times, Newsweek, the Los Angeles Times, Working Woman, Esquire and many other publications.

== Biography ==
Bell suffered hearing loss as a child due to a case of meningitis. As a result, she had to get used to using bulky and prominent hearing devices around her school-age peers.

Bell attended the Paier College of Art as an art major and went on to get a graduate degree in illustration and design at Kent State University in 1991. She became a freelance commercial artist, illustrator, and designer for an array of projects before beginning her career as a full-time author-illustrator.

== Career ==
=== El Deafo ===
El Deafo is based on Bell's own childhood. She wanted there to be a handbook for hearing people so they knew how to understand and communicate with deaf people without being disrespectful. The project eventually evolved into a graphic novel where children who were deaf could see themselves positively represented in a book.

Bell uses the imagery of everyone illustrated as rabbits as a visual metaphor. When she was growing up, she felt like she was the only "rabbit" whose ears didn't work, in doing so she shows being deaf as a power. She also shows and talks about how being deaf isn't something negative.

The title of the graphic novel comes from the idea that Cece feels powerful like a superhero with the assistance of her Phonic Ear, the hearing aid she uses in order to hear her teachers at school.

== Personal life ==
Bell is married to children's author Tom Angleberger.

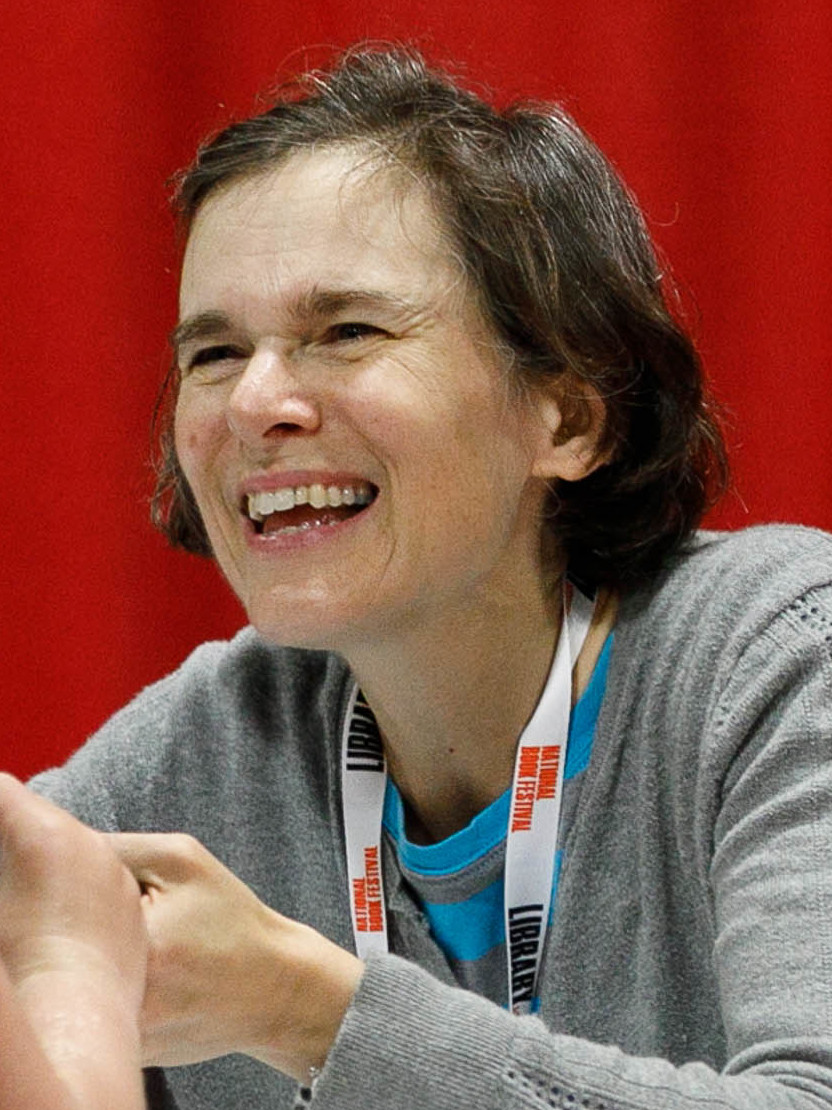
Bell at the 2019 National Book Festival

== Awards and honors ==
Bell won the Newbery Medal Honor and Eisner Award for El Deafo.

Five of Bell's books are Junior Library Guild selections: Sock Monkey Rides Again (2007), El Deafo (2014), Rabbit & Robot and Ribbit (2016), Smell My Foot!: Chick and Brain (2019), and Egg or Eyeball? (2020),

In 2014, El Deafo was named one of the best books of the year by The Horn Book Magazine, Kirkus Reviews, the Los Angeles Public Library, Publishers Weekly, and School Library Journal. It was also a New York Times Notable Children's Book.

In 2019, Smell My Foot! was named one of the best books of the year by the Chicago Public Library and School Library Journal.

Awards for Bell's writing
Year	Title	Award	Result	Ref.
2012	Rabbit and Robot: The Sleepover	Cybils Award for Early Chapter Books	Finalist	
2013	The Secret of the Fortune Wookiee (as illus.)	NAIBA Book of the Year for Middle Readers	Winner	
2013	Rabbit & Robot: The Sleepover	Theodor Seuss Geisel Award	Honor	
2014	El Deafo	Cybils Award for Elementary and Middle Grade Graphic Novel	Winner	
2014	El Deafo	Goodreads Choice Award for Best Middle Grade and Children's	Nominee	
2014	El Deafo	Kirkus Prize for Young Readers' Literature	Finalist	
2015	El Deafo	Guardian Children's Fiction Prize	Longlist	
2015	El Deafo	Charlotte Huck Award	Honor	
2015	El Deafo	Children's Choice Book Award for Debut Author	Finalist	
2015	El Deafo	Eisner Award for Best Publication for Kids	Winner	
2015	El Deafo	Eisner Award for Best Reality-Based Work	Finalist	
2015	El Deafo	Judy Lopez Memorial Award	Winner	
2015	El Deafo	Newbery Medal	Honor	
2016	Rabbit and Robot and Ribbit	Cybils Award for Early Chapter Books	Finalist	
2020	Chick and Brain: Smell My Foot!	Theodor Seuss Geisel Award	Honor	

== Publications ==
=== As author and illustrator ===
==== Standalone books ====
- Busy Buddies: Silly Stuff That Goes Together (2006, Candlewick Press, ISBN 978-0-7636-2776-8)
- Food Friends: Fun Foods That Go Together (2006, Candlewick Press, ISBN 978-0-7636-2777-5)
- Bee-Wigged (2008, Candlewick Press, ISBN 978-0-7636-3614-2)
- Itty Bitty (2009, Candlewick Press, ISBN 978-0-7636-3616-6)
- El Deafo (2014, Harry N. Abrams, ISBN 978-1-4197-1020-9)
- I Yam a Donkey! (2015, Clarion Books, ISBN 978-0-5440-8720-0)
- Chuck and Woodchuck (2016, Candlewick Press, ISBN 978-0-7636-7524-0)
- You Loves Ewe! (2019, Clarion Books, ISBN 978-1-3285-2611-3)
- Animal Albums from A to Z (2024, Candlewick Press, ISBN 978-1-5362-2624-9)

==== Sock Monkey trilogy (2003-2006) ====
1. Sock Monkey Goes To Hollywood: A Star Is Bathed (2003, Candlewick Press, ISBN 978-0-7445-9850-6)
2. Sock Monkey Boogie Woogie: A Friend Is Made (2004, Candlewick Press, ISBN 978-0-7636-2392-0)
3. Sock Monkey Rides Again (2006, Candlewick Press, ISBN 978-0-7636-3089-8)

==== Rabbit & Robot duo (2012-2016) ====
1. The Sleepover (2012, Candlewick Press, ISBN 978-0-7636-7935-4)
2. Rabbit and Robot and Ribbit (2016, Candlewick Press, ISBN 978-0-7636-7935-4)

==== Inspector Flytrap trilogy (2016-2017) ====
1. Inspector Flytrap with Tom Angleberger (2016, Amulet Books, ISBN 978-1-4197-0948-7)
2. Inspector Flytrap in The President’s Mane Is Missing with Tom Angleberger (2016, Harry N. Abrams, ISBN 978-1-4197-0955-5)
3. Inspector Flytrap in The Goat Who Chewed Too Much with Tom Angleberger (2017, Harry N. Abrams, ISBN 978-1-4197-0956-2)

==== Chick and Brain duo (2019-2020) ====
1. Smell My Foot! (2019, Candlewick Press, ISBN 978-0-7636-7936-1)
2. Egg or Eyeball? (2020, Candlewick Press, ISBN 978-1-5362-0439-1)

=== As contributor ===
- The Best American Comics 2016, edited by Roz Chast and Bill Kartalopoulos (2016, Houghton Mifflin Harcourt, ISBN 978-0-5447-5035-7)
- Lunch! (2016, Random House Books for Young Readers, ISBN 978-0-5535-1264-9)
- Funny Girl, edited by Betsy Bird (2017, Viking Press)

=== As illustrator ===
- The Secret of the Fortune Wookiee, written by Tom Angleberger (2012, Harry N. Abrams, ISBN 978-1-4197-0392-8)
- Bug Patrol, written by Denise Dowling Mortensen (2013, Clarion Books, ISBN 978-0-6187-9024-1)
- Crankee Doodle, written by Tom Angleberger (2013, Clarion Books, ISBN 978-0-5478-1854-2)
