= The Strange Case of Origami Yoda =

Children's novel by Tom Angleberger

- Author: Tom Angleberger
- Language: English
- Genre: Children's book, realistic fiction
- Published: 2010 Amulet Books (US); Turtleback Books (UK)
- Publication place: United States
- Media type: Print
- Pages: 141 pages
- ISBN: 0-8109-8425-3

The Strange Case of Origami Yoda is a children's novel written by Tom Angleberger that was first published on March 1, 2010, by Amulet Books. It follows the story of a young boy named Tommy who is trying to figure out if his classmate Dwight's origami Yoda puppet can actually predict the future or if it is a hoax that Dwight created.

It became the first in a series of popular Star Wars themed novels penned by Angleberger, which includes Darth Paper Strikes Back!, The Secret of the Fortune Wookiee, The Surprise Attack of Jabba the Puppett, Princess Labelmaker to the Rescue, and Emperor Pickletine Rides the Bus as well as an activity book titled ART2-D2's Guide to Folding and Doodling.

== Plot ==
Dwight is a sixth grader at McQuarrie Middle School who is considered to be weird. One day, Dwight folds an origami finger puppet of Yoda, a popular Star Wars figure. Through an imitation voice, Dwight offers advice to his classmates through Yoda. Some students at McQuarrie soon become convinced that Origami Yoda has a special connection to the Force, while others remain skeptical. A fellow sixth-grader named Tommy decides to write a case file to prove if Origami Yoda is real. He convinces a number of students to write about their experiences with Origami Yoda, while his friend Kellen illustrates the file. However, Tommy's friend Harvey, who has always been cruel to Dwight and is skeptical about Origami Yoda's wisdom, attempts to disprove Origami Yoda's connection to the Force.

== Inspiration ==
Angleberger has stated that partial inspiration for the book came from Origami artist Fumiaki Kawahata, whose origami Yoda has been seen on the Web.

Angleberger has stated that McQuarrie Middle School was inspired by S. Gordon Stewart Middle School in Fort Defiance, Virginia, which he attended as a child.

== Main characters ==
=== Origami Yoda ===
Origami Yoda is Dwight's finger puppet that he brings to McQuarrie Middle School. He is believed to be able to predict the future using the Force. At first, many students believe that Yoda is entirely controlled by Dwight, and Harvey repeatedly attempts to prove he is a hoax, but eventually almost every student at McQuarrie turns to Origami Yoda for advice. Yoda is generally willing to offer advice to whoever asks, though he might offer the wrong advice to someone who insults him, such as when he sabotages a rude eighth-grader in the spelling bee. Strangely, Yoda's opinions sometimes differ from Dwight's, such as when he recommends not seeing a vampire film, Parasite Within, because it will be "cheesy", but Dwight is excited to see the movie.

The instructions for folding the original Origami Yoda are never revealed, and it is unknown how Dwight knew how to fold him. Instructions for two simpler versions of Yoda can be found in the back of the first two books, including an "emergency five-fold Yoda."

=== Dwight Tharp ===
Dwight Tharp is the sixth (later seventh) grader who creates Origami Yoda. He is best known for his outlandish behavior and many strange or disgusting hobbies; these often get him in trouble or picked on. He provides the voice for Origami Yoda. Despite Dwight's strangeness, Origami Yoda's wisdom has helped many students. Angleberger has stated that Dwight has undiagnosed Asperger syndrome.

In the second book, Dwight is suspended and faces expulsion for an apparent threat made by Yoda, as well as the possibility of being sent to the Correctional and Remedial Education Facility (CREF), a reform school for bad kids. After hearing Tommy's case file and Harvey's defense for Dwight's actions at a school board meeting, Dwight's mom understands the good her son had done for the school, though the board of education is not as understanding. This results in Dwight's mom telling off the school board and transferring Dwight to Tippet Academy, a private school his best friend (and implied love interest) Caroline attends.

In the third book, Dwight is shown to have given up Origami Yoda, and appears normal. The reason behind this is the other Tippet Academy students single out Dwight and treat him as a "special" student in need of extra care. Tommy and the rest of the students eventually convince Dwight to come back to McQuarrie Middle School where he will feel more at home.

In the fourth and fifth books, Dwight and Origami Yoda help Tommy begin the Origami Rebel Alliance against FunTime, a series of educational videos inserted into the school curriculum that the students consider basic and boring. Dwight eventually quits the rebellion for fear of getting in trouble again, though Origami Yoda remains a member. At the end of the fifth book, Dwight is revealed to be the identity of "Princess Labelmaker", an anonymous person who helped convince Principal Rabbski to change sides and help get rid of FunTime.

In the sixth book, Dwight attends the field trip to Washington, D.C., with several lime-flavored Fruit Roll-Ups that he could fold into quick "Fruitigami Yodas" which could help guide the students on the trip. Later, he writes his first and only chapter for the case file concerning the departure of Origami Yoda in the "Mail-lennium Falcon", which apparently was Yoda mailing himself to a kid named Micah.

=== Tommy Lomax ===
Tommy Lomax is the main narrator of the books; he writes case files that concern questions most students have (such as "Is Origami Yoda Real?"). He is shown to suffer from self-doubt, usually turning to Origami Yoda for an answer. He also appears to be neglected by his rather dull parents. In the first book, he puts together the first case file when he has to decide whether or not to ask Sara to dance at McQuarrie Middle School's monthly PTA fun night. He eventually decides to do it, at which point Dwight reveals Sara does like Tommy, and had asked Yoda herself if Tommy felt the same way about her, with Yoda telling her to "go to the dance and find out".

In the fourth book, Tommy becomes the leader of the Origami Rebel Alliance, with an origami Obi-Wan Kenobi. In the fifth book, he delivers a speech concerning the student's feelings about FunTime, and appears in the local newspaper the next day.

In the sixth book, Tommy attends the field trip to Washington, D.C., in the bus driven by Mr. Good Clean Fun, slightly disappointed that he is not on the same bus as Sara. He is one of the students who went to the National Air and Space Museum, and along with Kellen, Lance, and Harvey throw paper airplanes which get them in trouble with Mr. Howell, causing him to forcibly trade his group of students with that of Mr. Good Clean Fun's so he could watch them closely. Later after everyone makes amends with each other, Tommy and Sara have their first kiss, which makes Harvey angry enough to punch Tommy in the face, giving him a bloody nose. As Tommy recovers, he is told by Dwight's last Fruitigami Yoda to search his feelings, after which Tommy deduces Harvey's feelings for Sara and understands that whatever he says to Principal Rabbski will determine Harvey's future. Still seeing good in Harvey, Tommy covers for him and says that he tripped when walking down the bus aisle. At the end of the case file, he writes that Harvey is his friend again, and that Sara and himself were now an official couple.

=== Darth Paper ===
Darth Paper is a puppet created by Harvey Cunningham, and an antagonist of book 2, Darth Paper Strikes Back. He teases Tommy and gets Dwight suspended. He is behind an unannounced grand scheme. Ultimately, he turns to the Light side and becomes Origami Anakin.

=== Harvey Cunningham ===
The main antagonist of the first two books, Harvey, is focused on a single goal—to prove that Origami Yoda is not real. Harvey always complains and insults everyone. The creator of Darth Paper, he repeatedly boasts that his Darth Vader imitation is better than Dwight's Yoda imitation. He was Tommy and Kellen's best friend at the beginning of the first book but they turned against him, as they are fed up with him criticizing everyone. He writes a comment at the end of almost every story. Angleberger has confirmed that Harvey is autistic, though this is never stated in the series itself.

In Book 3, Harvey turns to supporting Tommy, Kellen, and Dwight with some of his end comments, even to the point of adding his own contribution to the mini Dwight Case File.

In Books 4–5, Harvey joins the Origami Rebel Alliance with his Darth Paper (now Anakin Skyfolder) puppet in which he creates a longterm study of the effects of FunTime, which show that it decreases accuracy and focus, rather than increase it.

In Book 6, Harvey is once again the main antagonist, having created Emperor Pickletine, with a real pickle as the face, He also creates a "Flying Darth Vader" paper plane (which fell down and bounced off Mr. Howell's head). Revealed in this book, he had secretly been in love with Sara just like Tommy (there were several hints in the previous books). After Sara kisses Tommy, Harvey gives in to his anger and punches Tommy in the face, giving him a bloody nose, though he immediately regrets doing so. Tommy, seeing good in Harvey, covers for him and says that he tripped. Later, Harvey is now fully reformed and portrayed as being much more friendly and complains less, as well as accepting Origami Yoda.

=== Kellen Campbell ===
Kellen Campbell is a sixth (later seventh) grader who believes in Origami Yoda and is Tommy's best friend. He enjoys doodling above all else and always adds doodles to the case files which Tommy allows as they look like real people. Kellen does not normally write his own chapters in the case files because he feels it is too much like homework and has trouble writing neatly (which his mom chews him out about), so he instead speaks what he wants written on a recorder and has Tommy write it down. In the first book, he is in love with Sara's friend Rhondella, and was seen dancing with her at the PTA fun night end of the book. But in the second book, he damages his relationship with her when he ruins her campaign for school secretary when he hangs up promotional posters he made that depicted Rhondella as Princess Leia.

In the third book, a sixth grader named Remi falls in love with him. Rhondella, who at this point believes she and Kellen couldn't be a couple since she has matured more than him, comes up with a plan with Sara to help Kellen know Remi's feelings for him, in which Sara makes a "Fortune Wookiee" and origami Han Solo that will tell Kellen he can't be with Rhondella, though this makes Kellen not believe in the fortune Wookiee.

In the fourth book, Kellen joins the Origami Rebel Alliance, with an origami Luke Skywalker.

In the sixth book, Kellen attends the field trip to Washington, D.C., in the bus driven by Mr. Good Clean Fun. As he exits the bus, Mountain Dew is accidentally sprayed on his pants by Lance, creating the impression that he wet his pants (mimicking an incident in the first book involving sink water). Additionally, several classes and students (including Rhondella) saw him, much to his embarrassment (ironically, Origami Yoda had prevented this same incident from being seen in the first book). He goes to the National Air and Space Museum, and along with Tommy, Lance, and Harvey threw paper airplanes on a balcony. His plane flies straight and gets stuck on the wing of the Bell X-1, requiring for an expensive claim to be filed to remove the plane, though it inexplicably falls off on its own (it appears to have been done by Fruitigami Yoda with the force). At the end of the case file, it is revealed that he and Cassie had become a couple.

=== Sara Bolt ===
Tommy's love interest, Dwight's neighbor and Rhondella's best friend. She described the time when she was told to learn "The Twist" and then when she asked Origami Yoda a "personnel question", later revealed to be whether or not Tommy liked her as much as she did him, with Yoda telling her to "go to the dance and find out". In the second book, she started spending time with an athletic student known as "Tater Tot", which made Tommy nervous that he was losing her, but she turned out to not feel about Tater Tot that way.

In the third book, Sara comes to school with a Chewbacca "Fortune Wookiee" and origami Han Foldo which she made herself but claimed Dwight gave them to her. Aside from assisting students, she also planned to use them to convince Kellen that he and Rhondella could never be a couple and to help him notice Remi, though this makes Kellen not believe in the fortune Wookiee.

In the fourth book, Sara joins the Origami Rebel Alliance with her two respective puppets. She becomes the first to learn of Principal Rabbski's resignation plan in the fifth book.

In the sixth book, Sara attends the field trip to Washington DC in the standard school bus, along with most of the other girls due to discomfort of using the touring bus's lavatories. She later assists in searching for Jen's lost phone (which was not allowed on the trip) and then has her first kiss with Tommy, causing Harvey to punch Tommy in the face out of jealousy. At the end of the case file, she and Tommy are now an official couple.

=== Principal Lougene Rabbski ===
The Polish American principal of McQuarrie Middle School and the main antagonist of the third and fourth books. After McQuarrie Middle School receives the lowest Standards of Learning Test scores, she decides the students should focus on the fundamentals of learning to do well on the SOLs, canceling extracurricular classes (such as art, band, robotics, etc.) and replacing them with "FunTime" to do so, additionally threatening to hold back students with failing grades. Although a parent conference that featured the appearance of FunTime caused the parents to order her to do something else. In the fifth book, Rabbski plans to purchase "Xtreme Fun" thinking it is better quality, though the Origami Rebellion and Princess Labelmaker convince her that the videos are no good. After canceling all EduFun products, and reinstating extracurricular classes, she announces that she will resign as Principal and become a math teacher at the end of the year.

=== Mr. Howell ===
Gorman Howell is the most notorious teacher at McQuarrie - loud, impatient, and no-nonsense. He is the most likely teacher to assign Dwight In School Suspension. Kellen often compares him to Jabba the Hutt (other times a rancor and the space slug from The Empire Strikes Back). At first, he seems all in favor of FunTime and refuses to listen to disagreement, until he shows FunTime to the horror of the parents at Rabbski's conference, having used an origami "Jabba the Puppett" (additionally claiming he was his favorite character). During the sixth book, he enforces the rules of the Washington DC field trip with an iron fist, and is furious when Tommy, Lance, Kellen and Harvey threw paper airplanes (Harvey's bounced off his head), then distraught when Kellen's plane gets stuck on the wing of the Bell X-1, additionally showing the same "mutual respect Hutts have for each other" with a museum curator. He later becomes Principal Rabbski's love interest.

== Supporting characters ==
=== Mr. Good Clean Fun ===
An occasional guest at McQuarrie, who sings annoying songs to teach students about cleanliness. In the final book, he is one of the chaperones. He has a sock puppet named Soapy the Monkey, who is known to swear (always shown in random symbols).

=== Lance Alexander ===
A member of the Origami Rebellion, and Amy's love interest. He is one of Yoda friends.

=== Amy Youmans ===
A smart seventh-grader who is good at math, and puts her skills to good use in figuring out the Origami Rebellion's goals. She has a crush on Lance.

=== Quavondo Phan ===
A Vietnamese-American member of the Rebellion who was originally notorious for not sharing his tiny bag of Cheetos at the zoo, leading to him being nicknamed the "Cheeto Hog" and shunned until he asked Yoda for help. Yoda advised him to bring Cheetos for everyone during a Mr. Good Clean Fun assembly, which got him in trouble with the teachers but cleared his reputation. He later asked the Fortune Wookiee how to get out of eating his grandmother's meat loaf, and was advised to go vegetarian.

=== Mahir "Murky" Kahleel ===
A Turkish-American sixth-grader and a member of the Rebellion. Murky has a habit of inventing new words that get picked up as slang by the other kids.

=== Rhondella Carrasquillo ===
Kellen's original love interest, who broke up with him after finding him too immature.

=== Caroline Broome ===
A student from McQuarrie who transferred to Tippet, and a friend of Dwight's and possible love interest. She wears hearing aids, which led to her being singled out by the students at Tippet, until Dwight advised her to pretend her hearing had been surgically fixed. In the fifth book, Caroline sends a series of emails asking about something Dwight keeps doing with his mouth, which is revealed to be him mouthing the FunTime theme song.

=== Professor FunTime and Gizmo the Calculator ===
Characters from the math portion of FunTime. Professor FunTime and Gizmo the animated calculator spend every video rapping irritating songs and showing a worksheet of easy problems. Professor FunTime is played by an actor named Tevon Riley (who played a character in Parasite Within), who is revealed to also hate FunTime.

== Reception ==
Barbara Schultz of Common Sense Media gave the book a rating of four out of five stars, and described it as "Funny, [and] charming. Kirkus Reviews praised the humor and described the book as, "A skewed amalgam of Wayside Stories and Wimpy Kid that is sure to please fans of both." Elizabeth Kennedy of ThoughtCo described the book as clever, amusing, and unique. Elizabeth Bird of Fuse 8 Production called the book as Angleberger's best work, described it as a companion piece to the Diary of a Wimpy Kid series, and praised how the book can be enjoyed by all genders, the Star Wars aspects of the story, the character Dwight's arc with how it discusses tolerance of people who may relate to a stereotypical geek, and the different references and allusions made throughout, but criticized the references made to American Idol.

== Sequels ==
Five sequels have been released, as well as an activity book.

=== Darth Paper Strikes Back! ===
Published in 2011

The first sequel, Darth Paper Strikes Back (ISBN 9781419700279), takes place one year after the events of The Strange Case of Origami Yoda. The book includes instructions for a simpler version of Darth Paper (whose designer is known as Super-folder Ben), as well a 5-fold version of Origami Yoda.

An emergency Origami Yoda, along with a simple version of Darth Paper, is featured as a guest star and a how-to-fold.

=== The Secret of the Fortune Wookiee ===
Published in 2012

The third book In the series, The Secret of the Fortune Wookiee (ISBN 9781419705175), takes place immediately after Darth Paper Strikes Back!

The book includes instructions to make Chewbacca Fortune Wookiee and Han Foldo finger puppets.

=== ART2-D2's Guide to Folding and Doodling ===
The activity book (ISBN 9781419705342) was published in 2013. It contains a narrative linking four main sections describing how to draw and create origami characters from the book series. It also includes origami paper for folding. It does not have any part in the series with the exception of the introduction of several new origami characters like C3PO, Art2D2, kirigami General Grievous, Harvey's Darth Paper, and more.

=== The Surprise Attack of Jabba the Puppett! ===
Published in 2013

The fourth book in the Origami Yoda series, The Surprise Attack of Jabba the Puppett! (ISBN 9781419710452), takes place almost immediately after The Secret of The Fortune Wookiee.

The book includes instructions for Ewok and Jabba the Puppett finger puppets.

=== Princess Labelmaker to the Rescue ===
The FunTime menace is still not defeated, so a mysterious character by the name of Princess Labelmaker gives the case file to Rabbski to explain that the FunTime menace is evil and to request for Rabbski's help. Later on, Princess Labelmaker is collected by Rabbski. At a meeting, Rabbski and the Alliance fight against the school board and save their electives, as well as their field trip to Washington.

The book contains instructions on how to fold Luke, Leia, and in some copies, Obi-Wan.

=== Emperor Pickletine Rides the Bus ===
This is the final concluding book of the series. It was originally published on August 12, 2014. The ISBN is 9781419709333.

The book contains instructions for Emperor Pickletine and Flying Vader.
