= Implementation research =

Evidence-based policy and practice

Implementation research is the systematic study of methods that support the application of research findings and other evidence-based knowledge into policy and practice. It aims to understand the most effective pathways from research to practical application, particularly in areas such as health, education, psychology and management. Intervention research, also known as intervention science, evaluates how various interventions or approaches are adopted and applied in "real world" settings in order to establish an understanding of their effectiveness in different contexts.

== Public health ==
In the context of public health, the World Health Organization (WHO) describes implementation research as a form of research which "addresses implementation bottlenecks, identifies optimal approaches for a particular setting, and promotes the uptake of research findings: ultimately, it leads to improved health care and its delivery." The WHO identifies four notable characteristics of implementation research: it is systematic, multidisciplinary, contextual, and complex. More broadly, implementation research has been defined as "the scientific inquiry into questions concerning implementation – the act of carrying an intention into effect, which in health research can be policies, programmes, or individual practices (collectively called interventions)." To guide, understand, and evaluate the implementation of these interventions in a systematic way, public health researchers often draw on theoretical frameworks.

A range of qualitative and quantitative research methods are used in implementation research in health. Some methods have been developed specifically for the purpose of implementation research. These are pragmatic trials, participatory action research, effectiveness-implementation hybrid trials and quality improvement studies. A 2018 review of study designs in implementation research found that randomized designs, like cluster RCTs, were used 77% of the time, and 61% of studies included both quantitative and qualitative methods.

A working group of researchers in public health has proposed a standard for reporting implementation studies (StaRI) in public health.

== Education ==
As with wider social and human science-related fields, education and learning, involve many personal, social and environmental factors that could influence the outcomes of educational processes and student learning. As a consequence, controlled experiments widely used in educational research at times are hard to reproduce and it is difficult to disseminate their results in real-life setting. As a way to address such problems, in the 20th century a range of methodologies that study real-life learning processes were developed. Among these can be counted lesson study, action research (when applied to education and learning) and phenomenography. More recently more structured methodologies that apply iterative changes to a learning process have been developed, notably design-based research.
