= Supported employment =

Type of employment for disabled people

Supported employment refers to service provisions wherein people with disabilities, including intellectual disabilities, mental health, and traumatic brain injury, among others, are assisted with obtaining and maintaining employment. Supported employment is considered to be one form of employment in which wages are expected, together with benefits from an employer in a competitive workplace, though some versions refer to disability agency paid employment. Companies such as Skilcraft in the United States are an example of "supported employment" which is defined in law for state and federal reimbursements (by person not by agency or corporation).

== Community foundations of supported employment ==
Supported employment was developed in the United States in the 1970s as part of both vocational rehabilitation (VR) services (e.g., NYS Office of Vocational Services, 1978) and the advocacy for long term services and supports (LTSS) for individuals with significant disabilities in competitive job placements in integrated settings (e.g., businesses, offices, manufacturing facilities). Since the mid-1980s, supported employment in the professional literature primarily has referred to the "individual placement" model, either with job coaches or through "natural supports" models. The critical issue in supported employment (SE) was viewed as the need for funding for long-term services and supports (LTSS) in the community often termed beyond "case closure". Supported employment became worldwide by 2013, and has since moved to new inclusive models, and the term has been used for assisting workers of diverse kinds who may need an extra jump start in the workplace; it is still associated with its roots in disability which includes community integration and deinstitutionalization.

== University development of concept ==
Supported employment came from the community non-profit sector as an effort with government to offer services to individuals with significant disabilities, some of whom were moving from institutional life, in local communities for "supported work" (around the late 1970s). Community personnel entered rehabilitation programs, for degrees, and began an academic professionalization of the fields. Supported employment (SE) was on the rise nationally in the US in 1985 with growing university support, new dedicated agencies and programs, and preparation of master's and doctoral students in rehabilitation and education (e.g., Syracuse University, Rehabilitation Counseling, and Social Policy degrees). As an example, Thomas Bellamy, Larry Rhodes and Jay Albin of Oregon prepared a new chapter titled "Supported Employment" which indicated its uniqueness as having no entry requirement and no minimum ability levels (unheard of in vocational programs) in order to include candidates regardless of the nature or degree of their disability".

"Supported employment" was based upon principles of community integration and the site location termed an "integrated setting" was a core component of the applied and theoretical models (e.g., community integration theories, social role valorization, normalization, independent living theories, universal design). In addition, other critical aspects were paid work, vocational choices, employer development, school to work transition to job sites, and involvement of parents in the employment process. A Rehabilitation Research and Training Center (RRTC) on Supported Employment or related Employment and Disability areas has been funded in the university sector from the federal levels for over three decades under the leadership of Dr. Paul Wehman.

=== Diversity in supported employment models ===
By 1985, supported employment based on community integration had diverse vocational models in the US, including the social relationship concept of "disabled and non-disabled co-workers" working side-by-side in integrated workplaces. Both consumers (self-advocates) and parents supported the new movement (in intellectual and developmental disabilities), seeking better opportunities for jobs, and later careers. A leading text on "Critical Issues in the Lives of People with Severe Disabilities" (Meyer, Peck & Brown, 1991) highlighted Supported Employment as one of the emerging practices with research already available on benefit-costs, consumer wages, social integration, and ongoing support.

In the psychiatric field, the prominent approach, also very innovative in long term services and supports (LTSS) was transitional employment associated with the now international Clubhouse Model of Fountain House in New York City. Gary Bond (1994) reported supported work as a modification of this approach. Paul Carling (1995) of the University of Vermont supported the development of community employment options in the field of psychiatric disabilities; Paul Wehman conducted critical cross-disability studies near the Medical School; Dr. Steven Murphy (1991) adapted employment supports for the psychiatric field; Julie Ann Racino confirmed related affirmative business and family models (e.g., Racino, 2003), and Dr. William Anthony (Anthony et al., 2002) of Boston University and his research center continues to work since the 1980s on a "get-choose-keep" approach to employment.

== US legal basis ==
The legal "Integration" base for supported employment was described by Frank Laski, of The Public Interest Law Center in Philadelphia, Pennsylvania, (1985, April) as being the Education for All Handicapped Children Act (as revised by the Individual Disabilities Education Improvement Act) and the Rehabilitation Act of 1973 (amended 1978) passed by the US Congress. He also found strong support for moving from sheltered settings to supported employment in Developmentally Disabled Assistance and Bill of Rights Act (1975, as amended 1984) and fully supported a "zero reject" policy, individualized work plans, and questioning the notion of the "employability" concept.

Supported employment, emanating from the sheltered and governmental services sectors, has different roots than employment based upon traditional civil rights and discrimination approaches. Employment and disability often shares common roots with others disadvantaged in employment, based on discrimination due to gender, race, ethnicity, family structure, and disability, among other "differences" (e.g., Urban League of Onondaga County, Inc.). Such coalition based strategies emanate from the Civil Rights Act of 1964 and seek redress in employment based upon discrimination in hiring, promotions, terminations, and payments, among others. Such positions are not "dedicated positions", but may involve a reasonable accommodation (e.g., personal assistant, work desk modification) to perform the job as defined by the primary tasks of the employer-based system for "qualified individuals" Americans with Disabilities Act of 1990, now amended in 2008.

By 1991, proposed rules for the State Supported Employment Grant Program were published in the Federal Register for comment by the US Department of Education, and the announcement was made available to deaf and hearing impaired individuals through a TDD service (FR 56: 219.57776-57786). The Rehabilitation Services Administration (RSA)received comments, and the intent was to advance the program authorized under the Rehabilitation Act of 1973, Part C, as amended which supported disability rights in employment in the community. It also advanced the national goals of "literacy and "lifelong learning" for skills in the "global economy". in 2013, the US Department of Education, Office of Special Education and Rehabilitation, Rehabilitation Services Administration, issued a policy directive on supported employment (RSA-PD-13-02, April 30, 2013).

== United States development of supported employment ==
In the United States, supported employment is defined in the Rehabilitation Act, as amended (1978). The more recent Rehabilitation Act Amendments were contained in the Workforce Investment Act signed into law in 1998. The Rehabilitation Act and its amendments establish and fund the Vocational Rehabilitation program. Vocational Rehabilitation, which is frequently referred to as "V.R.", is the core national employment program for persons with a disability, but is not the main agency to fund long-term services and supports (LTSS) in the community. Federal funding is funneled through state Vocational Rehabilitation agencies, and categorical state agencies and their regional offices (e.g., New York Office of People with Developmental Disabilities) are also involved, including Home and Community-Based (HCB) Medicaid Services Waiver funded programs nationwide.

In 2014, the U.S. Congress passed the Workforce Innovation and Opportunity Act, which was the first legislative reform of the public workforce system since the Workforce Investment Act in 1998. In the Workforce Innovation and Opportunity Act, Congress added an additional supported employment strategy of customized employment to assist individuals with employment barriers, focused specifically on those with significant disabilities.

=== Core definition ===
Here is a representation of the core definition of supported employment as it is contained in the Rehabilitation Act Amendments (Public Law 102-569: Supported Employment Definitions). Supported employment means: A. Competitive employment in an integrated setting with ongoing support services for individuals with the most significant disabilities – a) for whom competitive employment has not traditionally occurred; or
b) for whom competitive employment has been interrupted or intermittent as a result of significant disability; and
c) who, because of the nature and severity of their disabilities, need ongoing support services including both intensive initial support services and also extended services after transition from those initial support services in order to perform work; or
B. Transitional employment for individuals with the most significant disabilities due to mental illness.

There are a number of important critically important terms and concepts referenced in this definition of supported employment. These terms are:

- Individuals with the most significant disabilities
- Competitive employment
- Integrated work setting
- Ongoing support services and supported employment services.

The most common model of supported employment involves job coaching with the traditional rehabilitation approach to "fade services" into the work setting; however, supported employment has roots in long-term supports and services, and variations based upon "natural supports" (e.g., payments to a coworker to provide assistance).

There was a research study done to look at the perspectives of people about supported employment for racially and ethnically diverse patients with mental illness in the United States. "People with lived experience described the positive effect of employment in their own life while highlighting the need to increase workplace accommodations and social supports for those with mental health challenges. Across stakeholder groups, participants emphasized the need for linguistic and cultural competence to promote equity in delivery of supported employment programs." "Implementing effective supported employment programs should focus on meeting the specific needs of target individuals, as many of those needs are not considered in current employment‐related programming. "

Principles of Parents for Positive Futures were: real jobs in real workplaces, services for all, ongoing support, social integration, and individualized and flexible. Self advocates agreed with Real jobs for real pay, especially starting from "make work" in institutional settings.

In the vocational rehabilitation systems, concepts of working with business and industry, competitive employment (e.g., achieving existing job classifications and wages and benefits), transition to the workforces from schools, and traditional obstacles to work including competition, are all addressed in the VR systems.

=== Costs ===
Costs of supported employment have been an area of research and study since its inception, and include academic studies in categorical disability areas (e.g., psychiatric, traumatic brain injury) regarding long-term services in competitive settings (e.g., Wehman et al., 2003; Rogers et al., 1995).

Supported employment was designed to be cost-effective and cost-beneficial, and indeed has been documented to be so as a key community services in public administration and disability. However, two cost trends are the medical center gates which change the cost structure and personnel (from collaboration between education and medical to medical operations; "physical restoration" by a "physiatrist"); and a government trend to cut the cost of its already lean services (e.g., natural supports to lower costs).

Cimera's 2012 review on the "economics of supported employment" indicated that: 1. Individuals fare better financially from working in the community rather than sheltered workshops, regardless of disability. 2. Relative wages earned by supported employees were up 31.2% since the 1980s, while sheltered workshop wages decreased. Over 30 studies were reviewed in the 1980s and 1990s including in the US, Australia, Great Britain and Canada finding that "individuals with disabilities experience greater monetary benefits than costs when working in the community".

However, concerns regarding subminimum wage and employment extend to the community, especially due to the interplay of benefits, entry level versus skilled jobs, wages paid to the employee versus employer benefits, and dead end versus career approaches. However, early studies reported benefits of $1.97 to every dollar in cost with $13,815 in gross wages and fringe benefits to the employee whom others viewed as "permanently unemployable" or "unable to work".

In addition, reviews of costs and benefits do not indicate the revenue streams for supported employment, especially when these programs can be one service of a large community "disability NGO" (non-governmental organization) and were eligible for Medicaid financing as early as 1991. Government itself in the late 2000s is increasingly concerned about costs, and vocational rehabilitation services, are being reviewed for their cost-effectiveness and ways to increase positive outcomes for clientele of their services

== Employment supports ==
Supported employment evolved as a way to assist individuals with the most significant disabilities obtain employment for real pay, and involves personal assistance services including for people who lived in institutions in the US. For over 30 years, supported employment has demonstrated that individuals with severe disabilities can work, yet today many individuals remain segregated in sheltered workshops and day programs. Efforts to convert sheltered workshops to provide supported employment (now, one person at a time) are underway, and a generation of Master's level students in Rehabilitation Counseling and Special Education have been educated in changing services and organizations from older, outdated segregation models to integrated vocational approaches in the community (e.g., Gardner, et al., 1988; Rogan & Racino, 1992). Verdicts in recent lawsuits upholding the right to work in inclusive settings seem to indicate that integrated employment will soon be the first choice.

Best practices dictate that an individualized support approach to supported employment, funded as a professional vocational rehabilitation service (now changing to infusion of risk and protective health factors), is used to assist individuals with gaining and maintaining employment (later, termed job retention). These practices may involve a supported employment service provider (professionals)to understand how to customize employment and provide supports, school personnel in transition, or it may involve an approach similar to bridgebuilding and person-centered community development. Supports could include: modifying a job, adding accommodations or assistive technology, enhancing on the job site training among other approaches, such as identifying network relationships (e.g., family business, local job sites and owners) and training parents regarding better futures. What is needed will vary from one person and one employer to the next, but do involve the human resource offices, the funding agencies, the supervisory levels, and even union leadership, among others. In 2010, customized employment, state employment first policies, and "revisiting key federal policies" are recommended as leadership in "employment of persons with severe disabilities"; however, with a newer movement toward the development of "non-work supports".

Early supported employment agency leaders, shifting from services to supports, included Jerry Kiracofe's Human Services Institute in Maryland, Jeffrey Strully originally in Kentucky at Seven Counties Services (now, Rogan & Strully, 2007 in Colorado and California), Richard Crowley's area agency in New Hampshire (Rogan, 1992), ENABLE and Transitional Living Services in New York (the latter simply deciding in 1977 that "long term clients" in the community had a right to seek jobs and work, supported by "residential staff"), agencies in Oregon (Magis-Agosta, 1994), Wisconsin and Great Britain, among others. These groups were associated also with research studies on job supports, workplace culture, and gender and ethnic concerns in employment structures. Supported employment was studied early in Canada in relationship to quality of life and an employment support worker.

=== Personal assistance services ===
Personal assistance services, a premier service of public policy and independent living, has a strong national and international research base dating back to the 1980s. Personal assistance services (PAS)has expanded to be an important component of "workplace supports" and is part of working schemes in countries such as Sweden. Personal assistance services and workplace PAS has been taught through Virginia Commonwealth University as an online course and is available in 2013 as a self-study through the independent living network.(http://www.worksupport.com/pas/funding.cfm) PAS has been developed for use by diverse groups, including in cognitive disabilities, inclusive of mental health, brain injuries and intellectual disabilities, and for individuals with medical and physical needs for assistance.

=== Natural supports ===
Natural supports models were funded by the federal and state governments, but public discussion of the concept and implementation has been lacking giving its relevance to workplaces and its federal research status. "Natural supports funding packages" were recommended by the university sector to state employment agencies with preferences for schemes which are based upon coworker training, the use of employment specialists to facilitate natural supports, and matching the supported employee with the natural supports of the worksites. Early models of "natural supports" were proposed by the rehabilitation community as part of research studies (e.g., Hagner, 1988), and knowing the colloquial paths of this approach international speaker Racino retorted, "What is natural about natural supports anyway?" The natural supports approaches were also aligned with related initiatives including empowerment and choice in employment, and gender differences in supported employment.

=== Reasonable accommodations as an employment support ===
One of the innovations from work with the Rehabilitation Act of 1973 as amended in 1978 was the application of the concept of reasonable accommodations to fields such as psychiatric disabilities. As part of deinstitutionalization efforts, now at the US Supreme Court's Olmstead Decision of 1999, "long-term services and supports" (LTSS) clients were seeking work in communities to support themselves (and sometimes families) in homes and daily lives. Systemic efforts were made to identify barriers to employment (e.g., Noble & Collignon, 1988), and legal avenues were also opened as described by Dr. Peter Blanck on the Americans with Disabilities Act of 1990. Reasonable accommodation allowed modifications on the job, while still retaining the competitive job site and pay grades in the community. The term "employment supports" was also applied to efforts to assist individuals which may come to the rehabilitation system with a "mental health diagnosis". These efforts may resemble those termed "natural supports" since job retention (involving coworkers and supervisors), as opposed to job placement (a traditional rehabilitation counselor function) may be key.

== Systems change ==
Supported employment was visualized as a way to change segregated services systems, based largely upon sheltered workshop facilities, to an integrated community approach to employment for individuals, primarily with intellectual and developmental disabilities. For example, in 1995, California leaders Steve Zivolich and Jan Weiner-Zivolich inquired of the provider and governmental sectors: "If Not Now, When?: The Case Against Waiting for Sheltered Workshop Changeover". However, while full conversion has not occurred with growth also in adult day programs, new principles in employment have been promoted through the national APSE Network for Employment. These principles include quality indicators on individual choice and control of resources and supports.

Conversion of sheltered workshops was recommended in the 1990s as part of the effort to shift financing and services to integrated settings. State trends in "conversion" to integrated work have been monitored by the Institute for Inclusion in Boston and are available on the internet.

"Local community rehabilitation agencies providing supported employment grew from just over 300 in 1986 to approximately 5,000 in 1993". However, Wehman and Kregel (1995) indicated that supported employment was established in every state through Title III, Part C of the Rehabilitation Act Amendments in 1986; Gary Smith with Bob Gettings indicated all states were funded for supported employment under the Home and Community-Based Medicaid Waivers, too. Supported employment remains a viable employment option and operates side-by-side with segregated employment options within states in the US and involved 212,000 individuals with severe disabilities in 2002.

Racino (1994) reported (conceptual schemes) that the changes required in areas termed "support services" require other than the traditional "organizational" or "systems change" strategies of professional education and training. For example, in a study involving herself, the VR system continued to revert to the 1970s "entry level" position as the agreed upon (employer-school-service provider)approach to personnel with high educational degrees and extensive work experiences (i.e., one size fits all) similar to parents of children with disabilities who might be in entry-level jobs with high degrees. These issues have been termed "attitudinal" problems or lowered expectations and aspirations for people with disabilities which may emanate from the employers, the public, or from the service workers themselves. In addition, traditional barriers schemas target the agency management and regulatory and legislative bodies as intransegient in modernization.

== Individual Placement Model (IPS) ==
IPS Supported Employment helps people with severe mental illness work at regular jobs of their choosing. Although variations of supported employment exist, IPS (Individual Placement and Support) refers to the evidence-based practice of supported employment (as Annie Oakley explains, referring to "everything under the sun") as validated by new universities and medical centers involved in employment. The model appears to be a variation of professional supported employment approaches, based on decades of research study and practice in the field of disabilities.

Characteristic of IPS Supported Employment

- It is an evidence-based practice
- IPS supported employment practitioners focus on client strengths
- Work can promote recovery and wellness
- Practitioners work in collaboration with state vocational rehabilitation
- It uses a multidisciplinary team approach
- Services are individualized and long-lasting
- The IPS approach changes the way mental health services are delivered

Another earlier model was termed the hybrid case management/supported employment model which was reported on by Carol Mowbray of the University of Michigan, who studied mental health services nationwide, as a WINS research and demonstration model. These models critique earlier models and goals such as zero reject and "linear models" and emphasize the comprehensive planning aspects of multi-agency "individual placements".

The New Hampshire-Dartmouth Psychiatric Research Center considers day treatment programs, often previously known as day habilitation programs in the community, and supported employment (totally community developed and rigorously tested outside the categorical psychiatric services) to be two kinds of comparative outpatient services. This research group, following others in the US, reaffirms that supported employment can improve outcomes such as integration. Day treatment is also a set of "educational, counseling, and family interventions" which may be used for children and youth per Krista Kutash of Florida's Research Center for Children with Emotional Needs (1996); whereas these "support services" may be applicable for adults, supported employment (SE) typically is an adult service and for youth transitioning to work settings.

By 2006, supported employment was part of a web-based certificate series with a new certificate for "supported competitive employment for individuals with mental illness". Typically, the audience are service providers who offer vocational and supported employment services ("university technical assistance and training"); these services build upon both traditional funded vocational rehabilitation categories (e.g., work adjustment) and newer concepts of career development versus jobs and job placements.

IPS Supported Employment has also been integrated with Supported Education to address the needs of individuals with recent onset psychosis. One study, building on IPS Supported Employment characteristics, integrated IPS with Supported Education to individualize services to meet the needs of their sample, who were individuals in their mid-20s with a recent onset of schizophrenia which occurred for many of them during their post-secondary education. The purpose of this integration was to support individuals in the program to have a choice of completing their education, obtaining competitive employment, or both.

== Education and training ==
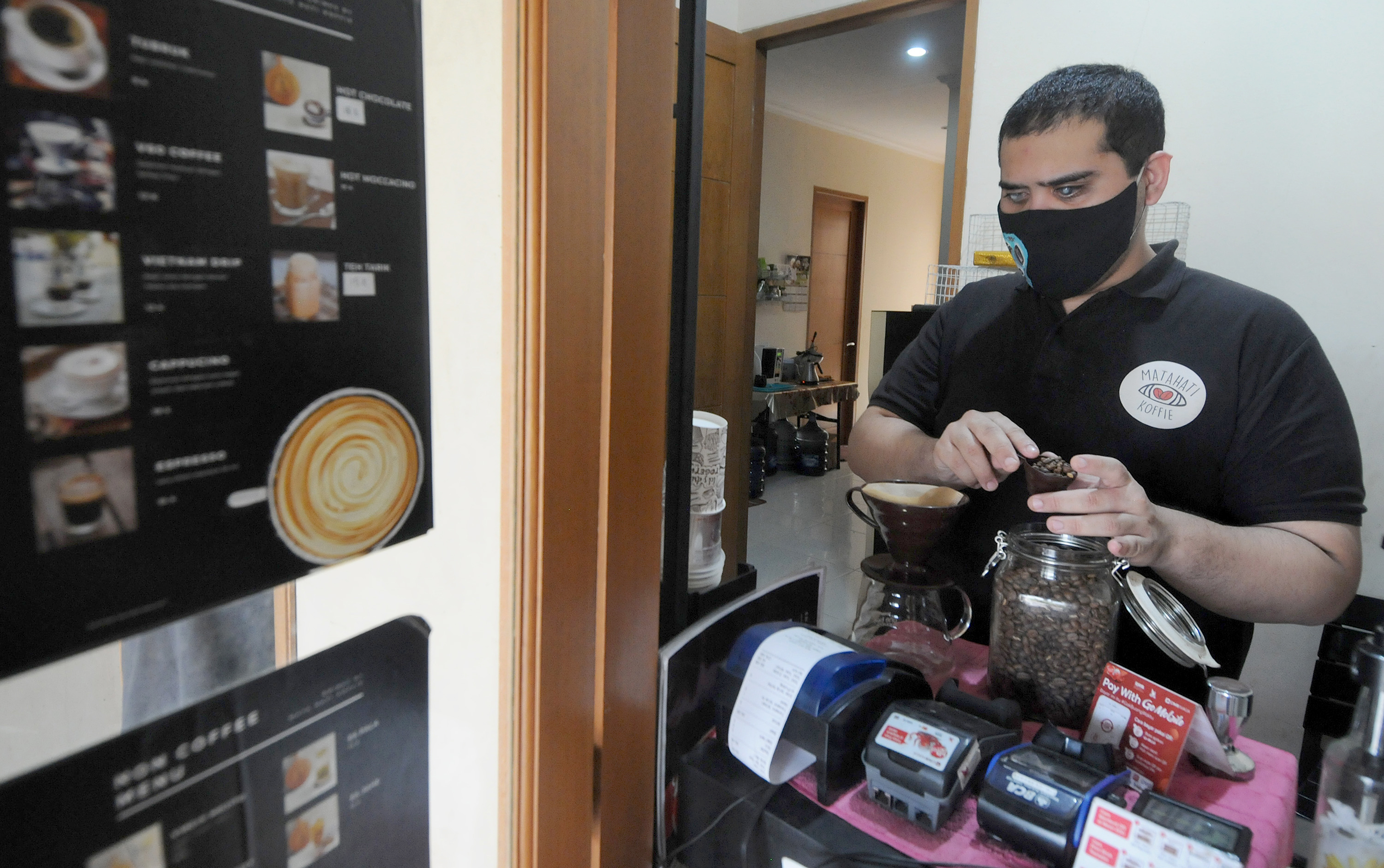
A blind man serving as barista in Banten, Indonesia

Supported employment, commonly a community service in the fields of rehabilitation, has roots both in the university sector, the vocational rehabilitation state and regional offices, and in the categorical service system of intellectual and developmental disabilities (long-term services and supports). As early as the mid-1980s, supported employment was an accepted inservice training topic with extensive working papers, videotapes, presentations, case studies, written books and products, and very reputable network of university personnel, including in severe disabilities. As indicated above, university certificates have been available since the mid-2000s on the web, and even earlier from the university sector pre-online courses (see, Racino, 2000). Certification is highly recommended, and indeed in most "providing sectors" needs to be required as providers tend to self-certify only. Traditional rehabilitation programs expected all rehabilitation personnel education programs to prepare for integrative and competitive employment as early as the 1980s.

Early skills recommended were both generic professional helping skills (e.g., facilitator, motivator, coach) and specific employment-related skills for workers (e.g., job sharing, job coaching). In addition, exceptional skills are required and more (e.g., political, social, administrative, health-human services) for conversion of traditional day programs to integrated employment systems. Marc Gold's Michael Callahan, after tackling the institutional populations (Marc Gold in the 1970s), was one of the 4 decade or more leaders to community employment supporting the provider sector.

=== Special populations ===
==== Autism ====
In the 21st century, autism is a primary "disability" that frames the progressive advances in the community services fields (e.g., Consortium of Citizens with Disabilities, Task force on autism and family support, 2018). The special issue of the Journal of Vocational Rehabilitation was published in January 1994 (Volume 4, No. 1) with Marcia Datlow Smith as Editor. The focus has a behavioral emphasis and the concept and realities of supported employment are considered revolutionary for "children who had difficulty in communication, speech, and the world in their immediate space." The issue includes a study of 70 individuals with autism served by the Community Services for Autistic Adults and Children (CSSAC) in state of Maryland.

==== Brain injury ====
Community services in head and brain injury took on a new priority in the 1990s, and for the first time, work and living options were explored in conjunction with the newly formed state associations of head injury administrators. These services were scientifically studied in states such as New York at their Buffalo and Syracuse university centers in the context of changing public policy. The traditional rehabilitation concept of return to work was also developed in depth at the university sector with the relatively new cognitive rehabilitation or cognitive remediation.

==== Mental health and intellectual disabilities ====
While for categorical state and local NGOs, work and community employment was accepted relatively early on (1970s and 1980s) as possible but difficult in "severe mental illness", but changing the state-federal vocational rehabilitation system was considered more difficult. In 1993, John Kregel at the International Association of Persons with Severe Handicaps, reported that individuals with severe intellectual disability, autism, physical disabilities and other groups continue to compromise a small percentage of supported employment participants. A systematic review investigated the effects of supported employment for adults with severe mental illness:

Supported employment versus other vocational approaches for adults with severe mental illness
Summary

Supported employment state laws in the US (e.g., New York State, Illinois) and its first inception in the US rehabilitation state departments (called Vocational Rehabilitation, predating Community Rehabilitation) dates back to the early 1980s (See, history of rehabilitation worldwide). The federal research study leadership, now approaching its 40th year, came through the National Institute on Disability Research and Rehabilitation (NIDRR) in the US Department of Education which prioritized 5 year, competitive center for assistance to all US states, university and college sectors, rehabilitation programs, governmental partners, and families and individuals with disabilities (competitive winner, Dr. Paul Wehman, of the Virginia Commonwealth University, virtually continuously in the US as collaboration with their Medical College, and technical assistance, Dr. Grant Revell).

The science industries in the US which include NIDRR partner centers and state university leadership collaborate with their governmental and private sector partners on supported employment programs in the US and the collection of data and research studies. Succeeding governments have found the evidence persuasive and under the Obama administration participated in Employment Ambassadors. Given the breadth and scope of the data, university centers have independently created national databases which are available to researchers for further studies. "Limited available scientific" evidence suggests that supported employment is effective in improving a number of work-related outcomes relevant to people with severe mental illness (which includes assessments by court-ordered psychiatrists), though there appears to exist some overall risk of bias (studies and centers are supporters of the state-federal program) in terms of the quality of individual studies.

Outcome	Findings in words	Findings in numbers	Quality of evidence
Employment
Obtained any job during the study Follow-up: mean 18 months	Supported employment may increase the chance of obtaining a job, but, at present there are only very limited data supporting this finding.	RR 2.62 (2.18 to 3.16)	Very low
Days in competitive employment. Follow-up: 24 months	On average, people receiving supported employment then had more days in competitive employment than people treated with other work-related interventions.	MD 71 higher (43 to 98 higher)	Very low
Days in any form of paid employment. Follow-up: mean 21 months	On average, people receiving supported employment had more days in any form of employment than people treated with other work-related interventions.	MD 84.94 higher (52 to 118 higher)	Very low
Job tenure for competitive employment (weeks). Follow-up: 24 months	On average, people receiving supported employment maintained tenure for competitive employment 10 weeks more compared with people treated with other work-related interventions.	MD 10 higher (5 to 14 higher)	Very low
Job tenure for any paid employment (weeks). Follow-up: mean 22 months	On average, people receiving supported employment maintained tenure for any paid employment 4 weeks more than people treated with other work-related interventions, but there was no clear difference between the groups.	MD 3.86 higher (6 lower to 13 higher)	Very low
Time (days) to first competitive employment
Follow-up: 24 months	On average, people receiving supported employment had 162 fewer days before finding competitive employment than people treated with other work-related interventions.	MD 161 lower (226 to 97 lower)	Very low

==== Women and Supported Employment: Gender ====
The university sector leaders in supported employment in the 1980s included Parents for Positive Futures which were women and men (e.g., Kathy Hayduke), women CEOs of non-profit organizations (who also were parents of children with disabilities, Josephine Scro), women state and NGO management (e.g., Sheila Harrigan, first CEO of NYSACRA), and women university professionals and researchers (e.g., "controlled for gender, age, disability, household size, race and ethnicity"). In addition, it was not until decades later that the complexity of gender and its role in the workforce (See, women's professions, and disability and gender, post-Adrienne Asch) began to appear in the American literatures "with special population women management".

In part this discrepancy was due to what was termed the "male education of high women in America", such as this author's over 40 male professors and 2 women professors (one visiting from out-of-state, and another not obtaining tenure) for her bachelor's degree at Cornell University in 1975 (e.g., Racino, 2014). Our Nordic lead began with gender perspectives on family caregiving and published "in house" (Rehabilitation Research and Training Center on Community Integration) a supported employment bibliography from gender perspectives (Traustadottir, 1990-. p.s., the daughter of Trausta).

In addition, the major federal research center in "mental retardation/intellectual and developmental disabilities" in the US has been "male-led" as director, associate director and Technical Assistance to US States) for over 3 decades (Rehabilitation Research and Training Center on Supported Employment, and variations) (e.g., Wehman, 1993; Wehman & Kregel, 1994) However, women have held key roles in labor and disability, including Suzanne Bruyere of Cornell University ILR (Industrial and Labor Relations) School. Since supported employment is a subset of employment and now business entrepreneurships, analyses of its role and effects in the broader employment studies is still open for further research.

== Other countries ==
"No matter whether they live in the most prosperous nations of the world or the least, people with disabilities are among the most economically disadvantaged groups in society.".

Other countries around the globe use the terminology 'supported employment' and each one has its own definition. In 1995, Steven Byer who visited the US from the United Kingdom, authored a chapter on Real jobs and supported employment for a leading book, Values and Visions by the King's Fund Linda Ward (with Philpot). Prior to that book, Britain's Ordinary Lives leader David Towell (with Beardshaw) cited the US supported employment in "Enabling Community Integration" to assist public authorities in the UK to move toward integration in community life. In 2012, the Journal of Vocational Rehabilitation (JVR) highlighted the status in the European Union, inclusive of Germany, Norway and the Scandinavian countries (e.g., Iceland, Denmark), and the United Kingdom. In particular, the European Union on Supported Employment is examining inclusion skills competencies.

Supported employment remains underdeveloped, in spite of its years of available direct university education and training to the provider, financing and regulatory sectors. In the US, the inquiry can and has been made to state and local governments: "Where are the successes?" based on the decades of infusion of funds, assistance, exemplars, for "state systems change". The Journal of Vocational Rehabilitation (JVR) celebrated its 20th anniversary in 2011 under the leadership of Dr. Paul Wehman, and over 3,000 special education or inclusion teachers annually learn of new developments (e.g., social capital, ethnic and cultural issues, business and marketing, supported employment developments) at the International Association of Persons with Severe Handicaps (TASH) Annual Conference.

Stefan Doose of Germany (2012) indicates a new federal Inklusion program (2011 from 2018) which promotes transition from school to work, and from sheltered workshops direct to the labor markets. Great Britain supported opportunities for Ordinary Lives, which included moving from day centres to supported employment as early as the late 1980s.

Today, the United Nations Convention on the Rights of Persons with Disabilities (UNCRPD, 2006) supports the right to employment, among its articles ratified by over 100 countries and in the implementation stages.

Supported employment services may be provided as direct vocational support to job seekers with disabilities, or in the form of affecting demand for labor through employment policies. From an international perspective, examples of employment schemes used on employers to generate an expansion of job opportunities for persons with disabilities (PWDs) include employment incentive structure and minimum employment quota. The employment incentive system is a financial measure taken in an open employment environment to integrate PWDs into the workforce and may encompass benefits such as wage subsidies and funding for adaptations to the work environment. The minimum employment quota is a legislative affirmative action that attempts to create equal opportunity for persons with disabilities by ensuring that a proportion of employees consist of PWDs. The two schemes are not mutually exclusive and may be used in hybridity.

Characteristics of Disability Employment Schemes
Employment Incentive	Employment Quota
voluntary engagement	legally mandated participation
provides subsidies to participating employers as compensation	establishes a bottom level percentage for the proportion of PWDs in the workforce
does not penalize non-participating employers	levies employers that fail to meet quota
produces supported employment opportunities through participating employers	produces supported employment opportunities through participating employers and revenue collected by levies

=== Asia ===
==== Hong Kong ====
The Labour Department of Government of Hong Kong's Labour and Welfare Bureau provides free supported employment services under the Selective Placement Division (SPD), which was established in 1980. The SPD launched the Work Orientation and Placement Scheme (WOPS) in 2013, serving to incentivize employers to hire job seekers with disabilities. Through WOPS, participating employers are granted a maximum total allowance of 51,000 HKD per employee with disabilities who have employment difficulties and 30,000 HKD per employee with disabilities who do not have employment difficulties. The allowance, respectively, is divided through nine months and six months of employment. The employers participating in WOPS are required to have a mentor staff that can provide on-the-job support for the new employee, and the length of the employment contract must be 3 months or longer. Furthermore, WOPS provides short term pre-employment training to job seekers to strengthen their chance of employment. After completing the pre-employment training, the trainees receive an allowance of $80 per training day.

The Social Welfare Department of the Labour and Welfare Bureau also provides employment assistance to job seekers with disabilities through Supported Employment (SE) and Support Programme for Employees with Disabilities (SPED). SE provides sheltered workshops to train individuals with disabilities that are unable to obtain open employment. SE service includes employment counseling, job finding and matching, follow-through support and employment-related skills training. On the other hand, SPED is an incentive system for the employers initiated in 2014 to aid employees with disabilities to retain their status as an employee in open employment. SPED provides one-off-subsidy to participating employers for modifying the workspace to accommodate for special needs or equipping the workplace with assistive devices that can enhance the work efficiency of workers with disabilities. The level of subsidy is capped at 20,000 HKD per employee with disabilities.

==== Singapore ====
Initiated by the Workforce Development Agency (WDA) and the Ministry of Social and Family Development (MSF) in 2014, the Open Door Programme (ODP) encourages employers to provide employment opportunities to individuals with disabilities and to create an accessible work environment for the employees with special needs. Through the ODP, the employers receive Job Redesign Grant up to 20,000 SGD per employee with disabilities, supporting up to 90% of the costs of redesigning the job scopes to accommodate the employees' conditions. Moreover, the employers are incentivized to provide special training for PWDs as 90% of the training course fee is funded by the ODP. As of 2015, the Government of Singapore has subsidized 3.2 million SGD through the Open Door Fund.

In addition, the Special Employment Credit (SEC) started to provide budget initiatives to the employers in 2012 by funding 16% of the monthly wages of employees with disabilities who earn up to 4,000 SGD per month. To encourage re-employment, Additional Special Employment Credit, which funds 22% of the employee's monthly wages, was initiated in 2015 as an amendment to the SEC program. Singapore Workforce Development Agency also provides Workfare Schemes, which tops up the wages of the employees with Workfare Income Supplement (WIS) and encourages employers to educate the employees with Workfare Training Support (WTS). WIS provides annual payouts capped at 4,000 SGD in terms of monthly cash and life annuity scheme called Central Provident Fund to aid expenditure and retirement savings for employees with disabilities. WTS subsidizes 95% of the training fees in addition to 95% of absentee payroll for the employee in training.

==== China ====
China Disabled Persons' Federation (CDPF), a national nonprofit organization founded in 1988, provides supported employment to job seekers with disabilities through free services such as consultation, rehabilitation and training for employment, and job referrals.

In 2008, a quota system that aims to protect the employment of persons with disabilities was established under Regulations on the Employment of Persons with Disabilities, through which the Chinese Government mandates all public and private organizations to secure at least 1.5% of job opportunities to PWDs. The exact percentage of quota varies amongst different provinces in China but is no less than 1.5%. Employers that fail to meet the quota must pay proportionate amounts of penalty to the Disabled Employment Security Fund (DESF). The revenue resulting from the levies is disbursed to provide supported employment in forms of vocational training and job placement career services. Employers that satisfy or surpass the quota are subsidized through taxation benefits, cash rewards and technical assistance to incentivize employment of job seekers with disabilities.

Regulations on the Employment of Persons with Disabilities also encourage self-employment by assisting PWDs with starting their own enterprises. The government helps PWDs who engage in entrepreneurial activities by providing tax exemptions and assistance in obtaining a workplace and licenses.

==== Canada ====
The Canadian Association for Supported Employment (CASE) works with employment service providers, employers, community allies, and other stakeholders to facilitate full participation in the labour force for people with disabilities by offering resources, expertise, and advocacy.

== See also ==
- Employment of autistic people
- Neurodiversity and labor rights
- Specialisterne
