= El Deafo =

2014 graphic novel by Cece Bell

- Author: Cece Bell
- Illustrator: Cece Bell; David Lasky (colors)
- Language: English
- Genre: Children's literature Graphic novel Autobiography
- Publisher: Amulet Books
- Publication date: September 2, 2014
- Publication place: United States
- Media type: Print
- Pages: 248
- ISBN: 9781419712173
- OCLC: 870199731
- LC Class: HV2534.B44 A3 2014

El Deafo is a graphic novel written and illustrated by Cece Bell. The book is a loose autobiographical account of Bell's childhood and life with her deafness. The characters in the book are all anthropomorphic rabbits. Cece Bell, in an interview with the Horn Book Magazine, states "What are bunnies known for? Big ears; excellent hearing," rendering her choice of characters and their deafness ironic.

The graphic novel was adapted into a three-part animated miniseries for Apple TV.

== Plot ==
The book depicts the childhood of Cece Bell, who lost her hearing at a young age and required the assistance of a Phonic Ear hearing aid while she was growing up to be the person who she is now.

While the hearing aid enables her to hear the world around her, it also distances her from some children her own age because she is seen as "different". This causes both frustration and depression in Cece, as she is desperate to find a true friend but frequently feels that she has to accept poor treatment from others being afraid of losing what few friends she has. She deals with these feelings by treating her hearing aid as a superpower, as it gives her the ability to hear everything. For example, she hears private teacher conversations, as her teachers wear a tiny microphone that transmits sound to Cece's hearing aid; and not every teacher remembers to turn it off when they leave the classroom. She adopts the secret nickname "El Deafo".

As time passes Cece grows more assertive and opens up to the people around her, especially when she meets a new friend who doesn't seem to care that she wears a hearing aid. She also grows comfortable in confronting people that treat her differently because of her deafness, finding that many of them are largely unaware that their actions cause her emotional harm. Ultimately Cece opens up to her new friend and reveals her secret persona as "El Deafo", much to the delight of her friend, who agrees to serve as her sidekick. As she gets older, she realizes that she no longer has to hide her "superpower" with others.

== Characters ==
- Cecilia 'Cece' Bell: Main character
- Dorn: Cece's kindergarten teacher
- Mrs. Lufton: Cece's 1st grade teacher
- Mrs. Ikelberry: Cece's 3rd grade teacher
- Mrs. Sinklemann: Cece's 5th grade teacher
- Emma Knight: Cece's 1st best friend
- Laura: Cece's best friend in 1st and 2nd grade
- Ginny Wakeley: Cece's new friend in 3rd grade
- Martha Ann Claytor: Cece's best friend in the end of 4th grade and continues to be one
- Mike Miller: Cece's 1st crush and new neighbor
- Babarah Bell: Cece's mother
- George Bell: Cece's father
- Ashley Bell: Cece's older brother
- Sarah Bell: Cece's older sister
- Mr. Potts: Cece's gym teacher
- El Deafo: Cece's alter-ego
- Johnny: A kid that rides the bus with Cece

== Awards and honors ==
El Deafo is a Junior Library Guild book.

The Horn Book Magazine, Kirkus Reviews, the Los Angeles Public Library, Publishers Weekly, and School Library Journal named it one of the best books of 2014. It was also a New York Times Notable Children's Book.

Awards for El Deafo
Year	Award	Result	Ref.
2014	Cybils Award for Elementary and Middle Grade Graphic Novel	Winner	
2014	Goodreads Choice Award for Best Middle Grade and Children's	Nominee	
2014	Kirkus Prize for Young Readers' Literature	Finalist	
2015	Guardian Children's Fiction Prize	Longlist	
2015	ALSC Notable Children's Books	Selection	
2015	Charlotte Huck Award	Honor	
2015	Children's Choice Book Award for Debut Author	Finalist	
2015	Eisner Award for Best Publication for Kids	Winner	
2015	Eisner Award for Best Reality-Based Work	Finalist	
2015	Great Graphic Novels for Teens	Selection	
2015	Judy Lopez Memorial Award	Winner	
2015	Newbery Medal	Honor	
2024	Odyssey Award	Winner	

== Critical reception ==
El Deafo was well received by critics, including starred reviews from Kirkus Reviews and Publishers Weekly.

Publishers Weekly called the book "a standout autobiography," writing, "Cece’s predilection for bursting into tears at the wrong time belies a gift for resilience that makes her someone readers will enjoy getting to know."

Kirkus Reviews wrote that Bell's "whimsical color illustrations (all the human characters have rabbit ears and faces), clear explanations and Cece’s often funny adventures help make the memoir accessible and entertaining."

Similarly, Susannah Richards, writing for Shelf Awareness, wrote "Readers will delight in the insightful and funny thoughts Cece shares through the guise of her cape-wearing alter ego, the superhero El Deafo. Cece's universal feelings make this memoir accessible to anyone who has experienced moments of awkwardness in wondering what others are thinking, making friends or wishing they had super powers."

Booklist's Sarah Hunter called El Deafo an "empowering autobiographical story" and noted how "Bell’s bold and blocky full-color cartoons perfectly complement her childhood stories—she often struggles to fit in and sometimes experiences bullying, but the cheerful illustrations promise a sunny future."

Katherine Bouton, a writer from The New York Times, calls the book inspirational for those who are different.

== Television adaptation ==
A three-part animated miniseries adaptation of the graphic novel was released on Apple TV+ on January 7, 2022. The miniseries features the voices of Pamela Adlon, Jane Lynch and Chuck Nice. The miniseries is narrated by author Cece Bell with music by Waxahatchee. Most of the dialogue is filtered through hearing aids. The child version of Cece Bell is voiced by Lexi Finnigan, who is also deaf and has cochlear implants.

== See also ==
- Hearing loss
- Hearing aid
