= Quality storyboard =

Method for illustrating the quality control process

A quality storyboard is a visual tool used in production and product development to outline the quality and performance standards for a project or product, ensuring that the final product meets or exceeds the specified objectives.

== Examples of Quality storyboards ==
At Yokogawa-Hewlett-Packard in Japan, the QC story is told using a flip chart of size 6 x 6 feet (2 x 2 meters). The project team uses colored markers to show the PDSA cycle (Shewhart cycle) and the SDSA cycle (Standardize, Do, Study, Act). After each manager writes an interpretation of the policy statement, the interpretation is discussed with the next manager above to reconcile differences in understanding and direction. In this way, they develop a consensus.

== Worker participation in managerial diagnostics ==
When the management attempts to make a managerial diagnosis, it is important that the people whose work is being diagnosed be properly prepared to enter the discussion. For this purpose, it is very helpful if everyone knows how to tell the QC story. Telling the story properly requires seven steps:

Problem definition
This step includes an explanation of why the problem is important (which will tie it to the priority statements of the top management or to a problem that is essential as seen at the lower levels). Normally, this step includes a discussion of the losses that occur because of the problem. The team will make an estimate of what should be done and work on it. A target is often specified, though it is understood that reaching such a target cannot be guaranteed. A schedule is proposed.
Data collection
This step involves observing the time, place, type, and symptoms of the problem. It involves data gathering and displays an attempt to understand the important aspects of the problem.
Analysis
In this step, various tools for quality analysis are used. This includes Control charts, Pareto charts, cause-and-effect diagrams, scatter diagrams, and histograms.
Action
Based on the analysis, an action is taken.
Study
The results are studied to see if they conform to what was expected and to learn from what was not expected. Data is taken to confirm the action.
Act or standardize
Appropriate steps are taken to ensure that the gains are secured. New standard procedures are introduced.
Plans for the future/Continuity
As a result of solving this problem, other problems will have been identified and other opportunities recognized.

These seven steps do not describe how a problem is solved. Problem-solving requires iteration, and it is often necessary to go back to a previous step as new data is found and better analysis is made. However, when the time comes to report on what was done, the above format provides the basis for telling the story in a way that makes it comprehensible to the upper levels of management.

== Questions to guide constructing a Quality storyboard ==
Definition of the problem:

- Does the problem definition contain these three parts: direction, measure, and reference?
- Did you avoid words like "improve" and "lack of"?
- Have you avoided using "and" to address more than one issue in the Problem definition?

Why Selected:

- Have you explained how you know this is the most important issue to work on?
- Have you shown how the issue relates to the customer or customer satisfaction, or how it will benefit the customer?
- Have you explained the method used to select the issue?

Initial state:

- Have you described, in numerical terms, the status of the measure in the Problem definition?
- Have you collected time series data?
- Have you provided some historical information about the status of the measure?
- Is data displayed in a visual, graphical format?
- Is there a flow chart or other explanation of the status of the process at the beginning of the project?
- Have you included other facts that would help the reader understand the initial situation?

Analysis of Causes:

- Is there a clear statement of the major cause(s) of the issue?
- Have you explained how the possible causes were theorized?
- Is data included showing how the main causes were identified?
- Is data displayed in such a way that the connection between the issue and the cause(s) is clear?
- Have you explained how the data were collected and over what time-period they were collected?

Plans:

- Is there a complete purpose Statement and objectives designed to move toward the purpose: direction, measure, reference, target, time frame, and owner?
- Is it clear how the target was derived from the analysis?
- Is it clear that the actions in the plan are aimed at correcting root cause(s)?
- Have you indicated what alternative solutions were considered, and how they were evaluated to select the best improvement theory?
- Have you included a copy of the planning documents?
- Have you indicated whether the plan was implemented on schedule?

Study:

- Is there a comparison of the target in the improvement theory and the actual results?
- Are the results displayed in the same graphical format as the information in "Initial state(s)" or "Analysis/analyses?
- Have you indicated whether the results were achieved in the expected time frame?
- If the results did not match the objectives or were achieved outside the expected time, have you provided an analysis of the differences?
- Have you included any other related results, good or bad?

Acts and Standardization:

- Have you explained the actions taken to hold the gain and updated all related documentation, training in the new process, skills training, physical reorganization, sharing, or process monitoring?

Future Plans:

- Have you included a list of possible next projects?
- Have you indicated which of the possible projects will be the next issue for improvement?

It is believed to have been first developed by a Japanese tractor company, Komatsu.

Quality storyboards were also used by Florida Power & Light as part of their quality drive during the 1980s to win the Deming Prize.

== See also ==
- W. Edwards Deming

== Bibliography ==
Walton, Mary (1986). The Deming Management Method. The Putnam Publishing Group. ISBN 0-399-55000-3.

Tribus, Myron (1992). Quality First: Selected Papers on Quality and Productivity Improvement -4th Edition. National Society of Professional Engineers. ISBN 99938-53-23-2.

Joiner, Brian L. (1994). Fourth Generation Management: The New Business Consciousness. McGraw-Hill. ISBN 0-07-032715-7.

Scholtes, Peter R. (1997). The Leader's Handbook: Making Things Happen, Getting Things Done. McGraw-Hill. ISBN 0-07-058028-6.
