= Lesson study =

Teaching improvement process

Lesson study (or jugyō kenkyū) is a teaching improvement process that has origins in Japanese elementary education, where it is a widespread professional development practice. Working in a small group, teachers collaborate with one another, meeting to discuss learning goals, planning an actual classroom lesson (called a "research lesson"), observing how their ideas work in a live lesson with students, and then reporting on the results so that other teachers can benefit from it.

Although "lesson study" is the most common translation, jugyō kenkyū can also be translated as instructional research, lesson research, or study of instruction, translations which perhaps better convey that the purpose of the process is usually to improve instruction generally, rather than to refine one lesson.

== Different levels of lesson study ==
In Japan, lesson study is conducted at the school, district, and national levels. Features common to all three levels are:

- preparation of a detailed lesson plan, providing background research information, lesson goals, connections to state or local learning standards, reasoning behind the design of the lesson, and steps of the lesson along with anticipated student responses;
- observation of a live lesson conducted with students (the research lesson); and
- a discussion following the lesson, analyzing its impact on students and implications for future instruction.

School-, district-, or national-level lesson study differ with respect to the students they consider.

- School-based lesson study (discussed in more detail below) aims to address a school-wide research theme.
- District-level lesson study is often used for schools to share learning with other schools. A school might have an open house, with research lessons held at every grade, which district leaders and educators from other schools will attend.
- National-level lesson study is conducted by enthusiastic volunteers who are also very experienced, highly respected teachers. The research lesson is done at a major conference. The objective may be to explore new content or to present a new approach to teaching particular content. National-level research lessons often inform changes in the national Course of Study.

Despite differences between Japanese and American educational systems (see Education in Japan and Education in the United States), the practice is gaining in popularity in the United States in K-12 education and teacher training (See Instructional rounds), and more recently it is finding a home in higher education as a form of faculty development.

This is a specific example of the ongoing Japanese devotion to the Plan-Do-Check-Act PDCA decision-making discipline pioneered by W. Edwards Deming, which is based upon the Shewhart Cycle (named after Deming's collaborator from Bell Telephone Laboratories, Walter A. Shewhart).

== School-based lesson study ==
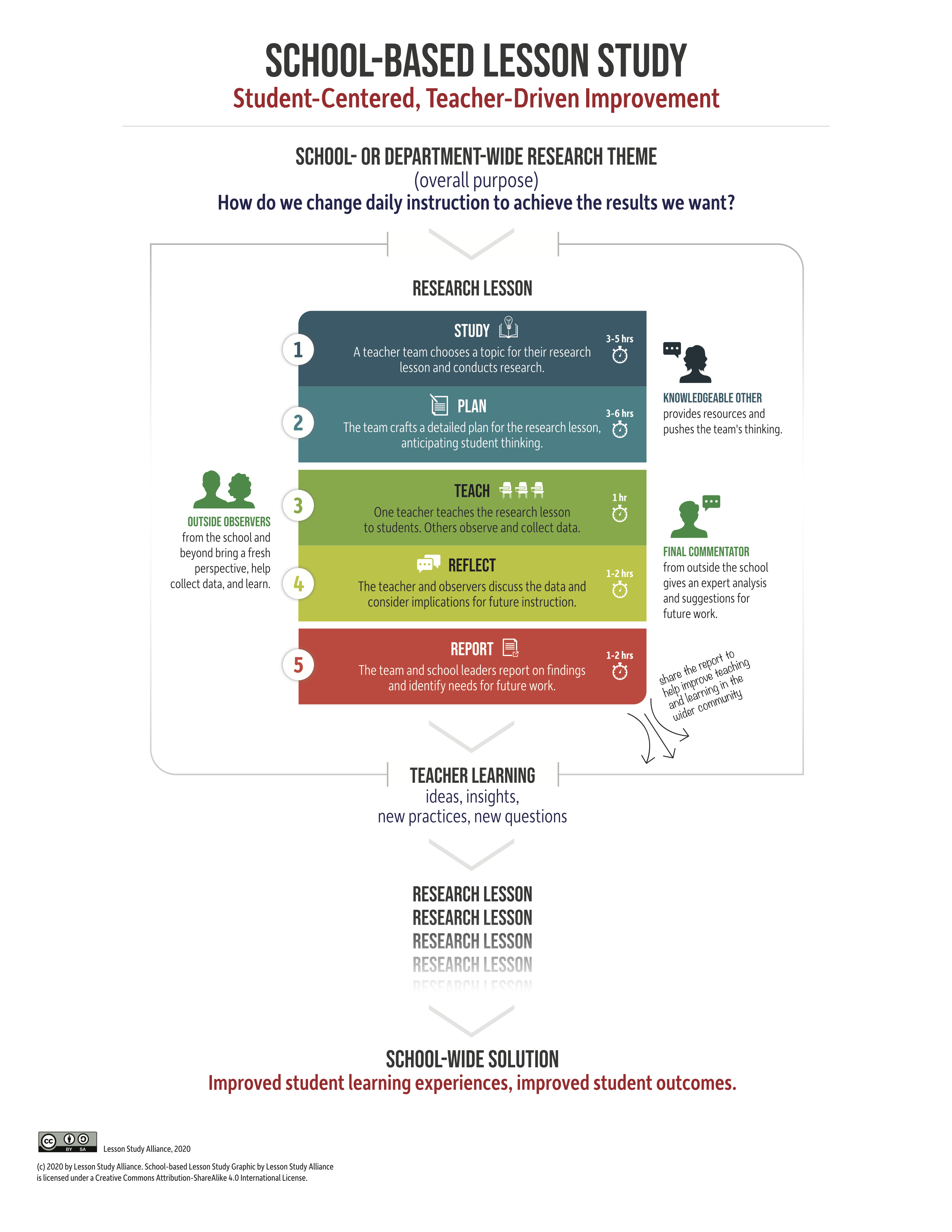
Graphical depiction of school-based lesson study developed by Lesson Study Alliance.

The most common form of lesson study in Japan is school-based. In contrast to the other forms of lesson study, school-based lesson study usually involves a sequence of research lessons, extending through one or more academic years, focused on a common teaching/learning issue referred to as the research theme. A research theme may be content-specific – e.g. "For students to see the connection between science and their everyday lives" – or cross-curricular – e.g. "For students to clearly express their ideas and carefully consider the ideas of their friends" – or affective – e.g. "For students to feel the joy of learning."

Another common objective of school-based lesson study is to address changes in the national Course of Study, which in Japan is revised every 9 years or so.

Through multiple research lessons at different grade levels, a school faculty works toward a common vision of how to achieve their goals. Since the goal is not to refine individual lessons, it is not considered a normal part of lesson study to revise and reteach a lesson, although that is done on occasion.

The median time for the planning of one research lesson in Japan is more than 5 weeks.
