= Splintered (novel series) =

Novel series by A.G. Howard

Splintered is a novel series titled after its first novel, Splintered, written by A.G. Howard or Anita Grace Howard. The second novel is titled Unhinged, while the third novel is titled Ensnared. The series is inspired on Lewis Carroll’s Alice’s Adventures in Wonderland and Through the Looking-Glass novels, with the protagonist being a teenage girl named Alyssa Gardner, presented in the series as a descendant of Alice Liddell. The story is thus considered as a modern-day adaptation of Carroll's books. The Italian translation was Il mio splendido migliore amico.
