= Tom Angleberger =

American children's writer

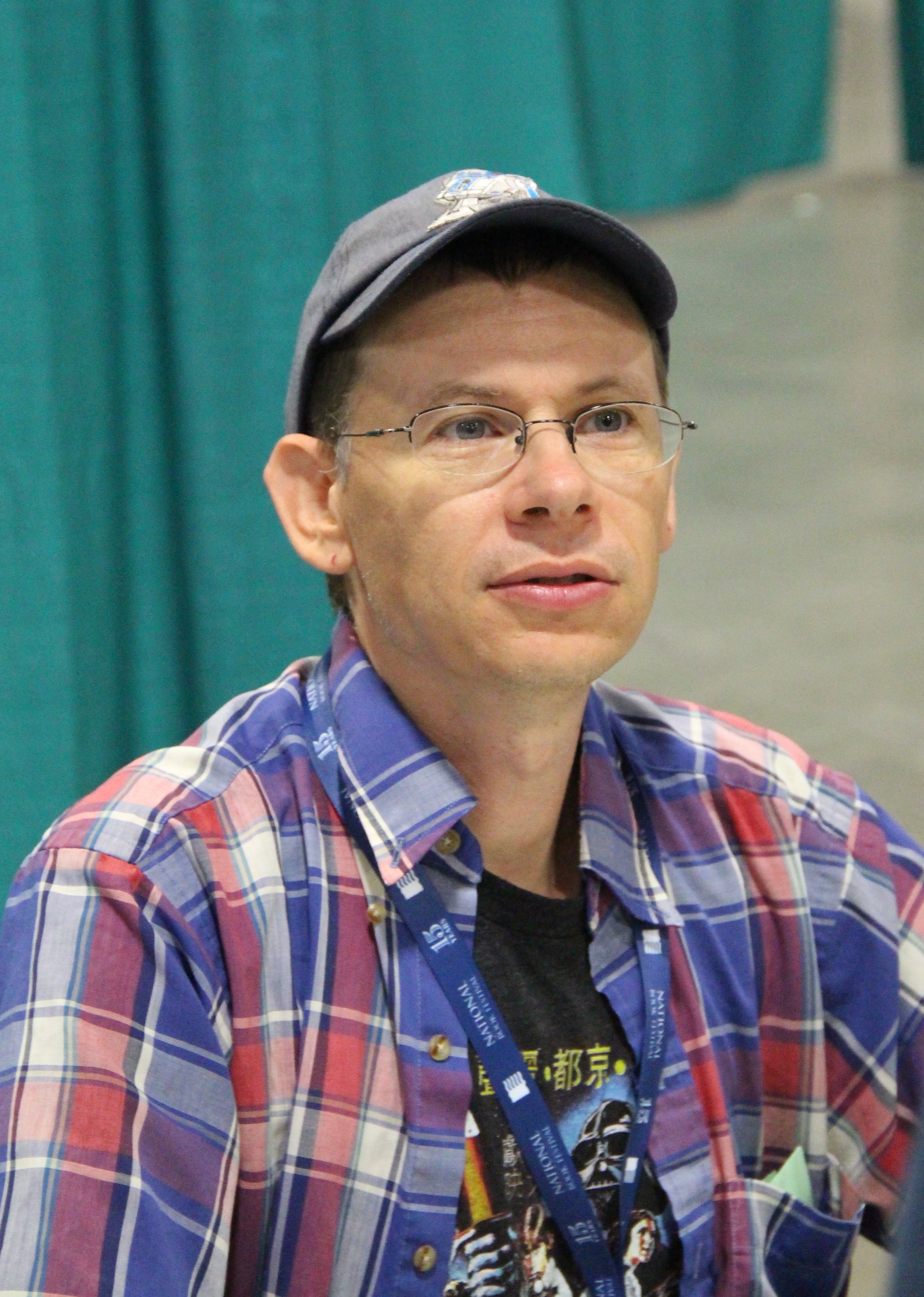
- Angleberger at the 2015 National Book Festival
- Education: College of William & Mary (BA)
- Spouse: Cece Bell
- Children: 2
- Writing career
- Pen name: Sam Riddleburger
- Genre: Children's fiction
- Notable awards: Blue Bonnet
- Website: origamiyoda.com

Tom Angleberger is an American children's writer, best known for the Origami Yoda series. By March 2013, more than 3.3 million copies of his books had been sold worldwide. Angleberger lives in Virginia with his wife, Cece Bell, who is also a children's author. Angleberger is also the author of children's books published under the name Sam Riddleburger.

Angleberger and wife Cece Bell met at the College of William & Mary, where they both majored in art. They have two children. Angleberger has Asperger syndrome.

== Works ==
=== As Tom Angleberger ===
- Art2-D2’s Guide to Folding and Doodling
- The Qwikpick Papers: Poop Fountain! (2007)
- The Strange Case of Origami Yoda (2010)
- Horton Halfpott Or, The Fiendish Mystery Of Smugwick Manor; Or, The Loosening Of M'lady Luggertuck's Corset (2011)
- Origami Yoda: Darth Paper Strikes Back, Vol. 2 (2011)
- Fake Mustache (2012), illustrated by Jen Wang
- Origami Yoda: The Secret of the Fortune Wookiee, Vol. 3 (2012)
- Crankee Doodle (2013), illustrated by Cece Bell
- Origami Yoda: The Surprise Attack of Jabba the Puppett, Vol. 4 (2013)
- Origami Yoda: Emperor Pickletine Rides the Bus, Vol. 6 (2014)
- Origami Yoda: Princess Labelmaker to the Rescue! Vol. 5 (2014)
- McToad Mows Tiny Island (2015), illustrated by John Hendrix
- The Qwikpick Papers: The Rat with the Human Face (2015)
- Return of the Jedi: Beware the Power of the Dark Side! (2015)
- Fuzzy (2016), with Paul Dellinger
- Inspector Flytrap (2016)
- Rocket and Groot: Stranded on Planet Strip Mall (2016)
- Rocket and Groot: Keep on Truckin (2017)
- The Princess and the Pit Stop (2018)
- Star Wars: The Mighty Chewbacca in the Forest of Fear (2018)
- Bach to the Rescue!!! (2019), illustrated by Elio
- Didi Dodo, Future Spy: Recipe for Disaster (2019), illustrated by Jared Chapman
- Geronimo Stilton: The Sewer Rat Stink (2020), with Elisabetta Dami
- DJ Funkyfoot: Butler for Hire, Vol. 1 (2021), illustrated by Heather Fox
- DJ Funkyfoot: Give Cheese a Chance, Vol. 2 (2021), illustrated by Heather Fox
- Geronimo Stilton: Slime for Dinner, Vol. 2 (2021), with Elisabetta Dami
- Two-Headed Chicken (2022)
- Beak to the Future (2023)
- Dino Poet, Vol. 1 (2025)
- Dino Poet: Pen Pals, Vol. 2 (2026)

=== As Sam Riddleburger ===
- Qwikpick Adventure Society (2007)
  - Reissued 2014 as The Qwikpick Papers: Poop Fountain!, illustrated by Jen Wang and audio read by Mark Turetsky
- Stonewall Hinkleman and the Battle of Bull Run (2009), with Michael Hemphill
