= The Art of Walt Disney =

1973 non-fiction book by Christopher Finch

- Author: Christopher Finch
- Publication date: 1973

The Art of Walt Disney: From Mickey Mouse to the Magic Kingdoms (also known as The Art of Walt Disney) is a book by Christopher Finch, chronicling the artistic achievements and history of Walt Disney and his namesake studio. The original edition was published in 1973; revised and expanded editions were issued in 1975, 1995, 2004, 2011, and 2023. The newest edition of the book covers a broad history of the company and specific sections for movies, Pixar, live action and the Theme parks. The fourth edition also includes a foreword by John Lasseter.

== Background ==
Born in Guernsey, England in 1939, Christopher Robin Finch began his painting career in Paris. In London, at the Chelsea Art School, he began writing about art for magazines. He went on to write about many famous artists including Andy Warhol, Jasper Johns, Jim Dine, David Hockney, and Ed Ruscha. The first books he published were a collection of essays based on his work with artists and pop artists: Pop Art: Object & Image, Image as Language: Aspects of British Art, and a monograph about the work of Patrick Caulfield. Later, Finch became an associate curator at the Walker Art Center before going to New York to continue writing. There, he began writing The Art of Walt Disney. In 1984, after a hiatus, he returned to making graphics, photography, and paintings; some of which were featured in multiple galleries around the United States. He died on April 1, 2022 at the age of 82.

== Contents ==
The table of contents are:

Part I: A New Art Form

1. Early Enterprises
2. Mickey Mouse and Silly Symphonies
3. Six Cartoon Classics
4. Hyperion Days

Part II: Feature Animation

1. Snow White: The First Feature
2. Pinocchio
3. Fantasia: The Great Experiment
4. Dumbo and Bambi
5. Interruptions and Innovations
6. Later Animation

Part III: Live Action Films

1. Actors and Animals
2. Davy Crockett, Other Heroes and Mary Poppins

Part IV: The Magic Kingdoms

1. Beyond Film: Disneyland and Walt Disney World

== Editions ==
Since its release in 1973, The Art of Walt Disney has expanded and revised its content on five occasions; 1975, 1995, 2004, 2011, and 2023. Each edition and revision elaborates on the growth of the Walt Disney company throughout the years. Paying attention to the inspiration and creations of drawings, cover art, theme park additions and attractions, archives, and interviews with employees.

=== 1975 ===
In 1975, Christopher Finch released the first revised, expanded edition of The Art of Walt Disney. Finch includes the creative process of Walt Disney, and how his imagination created concepts and creatures that helped build the company. Information throughout the book is compiled from interviews with staff members, archives, theme park concepts, and illustrations.

=== 1995 ===
The 1995 edition of The Art of Walt Disney discusses the development of the Walt Disney company over the past 20 years since the last edition in 1975. Finch examines the history of Disney’s cover art, the illustration, imagination, and animation cels behind newly released films such as The Lion King, Beauty and the Beast, and Aladdin. Adding in information on previously-unpublished concept art, and Disney theme park additions.

=== 2004 ===
2004 revised edition of the book, focuses on Walt Disney’s achievements as a company. Incorporating interviews of previous and current staff members, decades of film stills, hundreds of illustrations and concept art.

=== 2011 ===
2011 is another revised edition that further explains the expansion and development of the Walt Disney company. Bringing in more information on the company’s connection with Pixar films. This revision goes into greater detail with the process of ideas, illustrations, concept art, theme park additions, films, and animations.

=== 2023 ===
The 2023 revised edition even further explains the expansion development of the Walt Disney company. The Book brings more information of the theme parks, animation and films. The revised edition was released to commemorate the 100th anniversary of the company.
