= Jenny Johnson (businesswoman) =

American business executive (born 1964)

- Born: Jennifer Morrow Johnson; 1964 (age 61–62); Morristown, New Jersey, U.S.
- Education: University of California, Davis (BA)
- Title: CEO of Franklin Templeton
- Predecessor: Greg Johnson
- Children: 5

Jennifer Morrow Johnson (born 1964) is an American business executive who is the current chief executive officer (CEO) of Franklin Templeton, a company founded in 1947 by her grandfather, Rupert H. Johnson Sr.

In 2023, Johnson ranked 61st in the Forbes list of World's 100 Most Powerful Women. American Banker put Johnson as No. 4 on its 2023 Most Powerful Women in Finance list.

== Early life and education ==
Johnson was born in 1964 in Morristown, New Jersey. Her father, Charles B. Johnson, was CEO of Franklin Resources while her mother, Ann Johnson, was a physician who had graduated from Stanford University School Medicine. Johnson is a third generational member of the Johnson family that had founded and managed Franklin Templeton Investments. She had six siblings.

Growing up, Johnson was the only one of the siblings who wanted to work in the family business. When she was 14, during school holidays she worked in the mailroom for a local fund company.

Johnson attended University of California, Davis, where she was on the women basketball team for a short time and then joined Alpha Phi. She graduated in 1987 with a B.A. in economics and physical education. After graduation, her father encouraged her to move away from the family base near San Francisco to New York City to pursue a career in finance.

== Career ==
In 1987, Johnson joined Drexel Burnham Lambert as a trainee. The next year, she moved back to San Francisco and started working for Franklin Templeton Investments. Her first job was working in a bank that it had acquired.

Over the following three decades, Johnson held various roles in different departments of Franklin Templeton Investments which included consumer lending, technology and operations, wealth management and alternative investments. Johnson became chief operating officer in 2010 and president in 2016.

In February 2020, Johnson became CEO of Franklin Templeton Investments taking over from her brother Greg Johnson who became Executive chairman. In October 2025, Daniel Gamba, Terrence Murphy, and Matthew Nicholls were named Co-Presidents, with Johnson continuing as CEO.

During her time as CEO, Johnson has overseen a series of acquisitions by the company, which included Legg Mason, Lexington Partners and Putnam Investments. As a result, Franklin Templeton Investments' assets under management increased to over $1 trillion.

== Board memberships ==
Johnson has served on a variety of boards, including the International Advisory Panel of the Monetary Authority of Singapore, the New York Stock Exchange board advisory council, Memorial Sloan Kettering cancer foundation, Thermo Fisher Scientific and Catalyst.

== Personal life ==
Johnson was previously married to a tech entrepreneur and has divorced. She has two sons and three daughters. She is a keen horse rider and enjoys spending time with her children at her ranch in Montana. Johnson currently lives in Florida.
