= James Murren =

American businessman (born 1961)

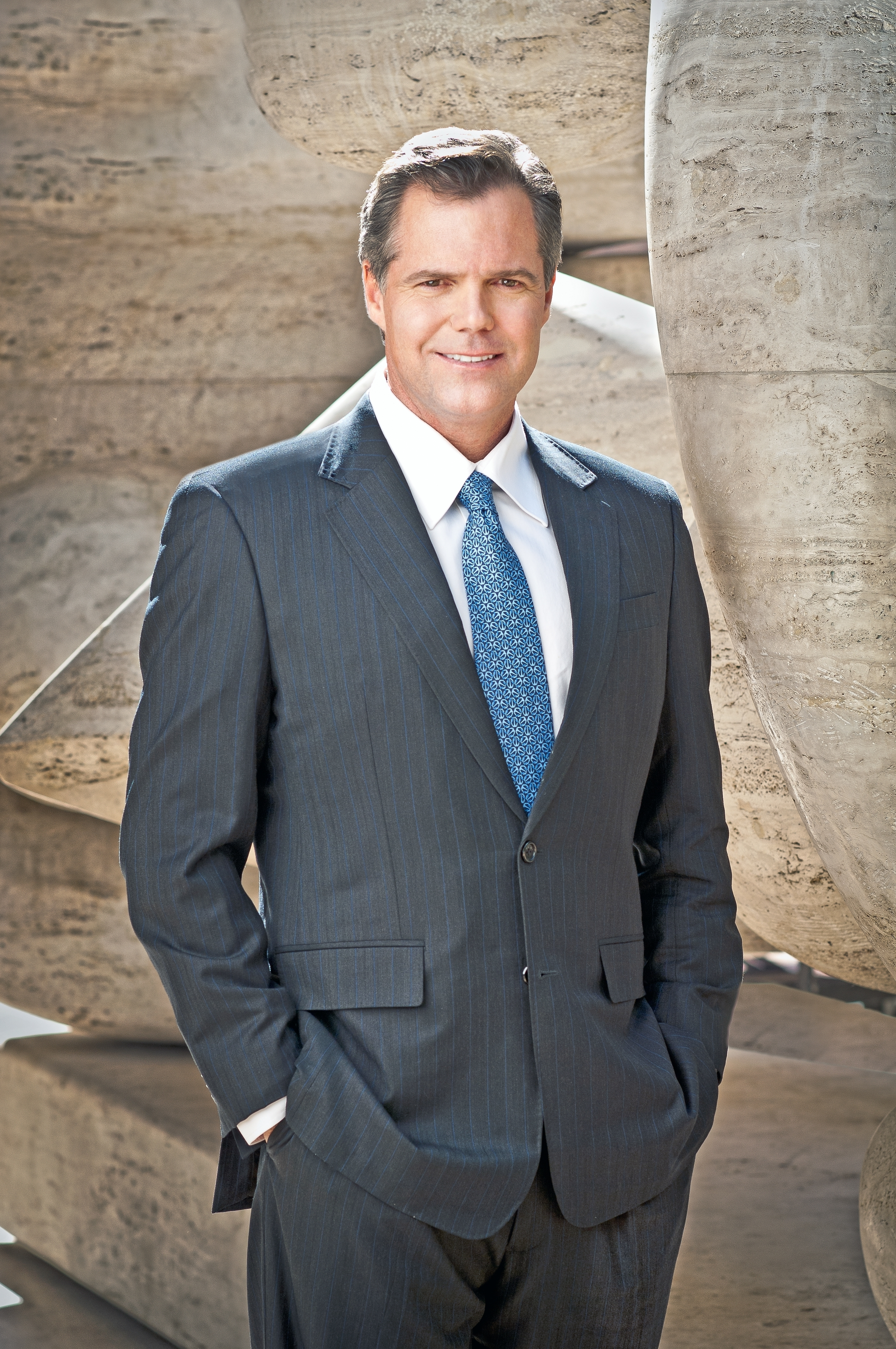
- James Murren (2014)
- Born: James Joseph Murren; October 5, 1961 (age 65); Bridgeport, Connecticut, U.S.
- Education: Trinity College (B.A.)
- Occupation: Businessman
- Spouse: Heather Hay (m. 1990; div. 2021)
- Children: 2

James Joseph Murren (born October 5, 1961) is an American businessman. He was the chairman and CEO of MGM Resorts International. He is a member of the National Infrastructure Advisory Council.

On March 22, 2020, Murren was appointed by Nevada Governor Steve Sisolak to lead a task force to coordinate private-sector support for the government response to the COVID-19 pandemic.

== Early life and education ==
Murren attended Roger Ludlowe High School in Fairfield, Connecticut, where he played football and baseball and was a member of the National Honor Society. Murren received his undergraduate degree at Trinity College in Connecticut, where he studied art history and urban studies and attended Cesare Barbieri Center in Rome, Italy.

== Career ==
=== Early positions ===
After college, he joined the Wall Street firm of Cyrus J. Lawrence as a securities analyst and earned the Chartered Financial Analyst certification in 1991. He was elected a member of the firm's Board of Directors, becoming the youngest member ever of the company's board. During his career on Wall Street he brought about a pivotal recapitalization of MGM Grand, Inc. in 1996 and served as a Managing Director and the Director of U.S. equity research for Deutsche Bank.

=== 1998-2012: Joining MGM ===
In 1998, he moved to the corporate sector, joining MGM as CFO and member of its board of directors. In 1999, he became president and was promoted to chief operating officer in 2007; he became chairman and CEO in December 2008, his 10th year at the company. Under his tenure, the company embarked upon an extremely successful decade of growth. Murren was the architect of $15 billion of acquisitions including Primadonna Resort & Casino in 1998, Mirage Resorts in 2000 and Mandalay Resort Group in 2005—acquisitions that helped transform MGM into the world's largest gaming company. He was repeatedly honored as the gaming and lodging industry's top CFO by Institutional Investor magazine.

In 2008 and 2009, Murren led an extensive reorganization of the company, resulting in over $500 million of annual savings; this, together with a $3.8 billion financing effort, kept the company from failure during the early days of the Great Recession in 2008 and 2009.

During Murren's tenure, MGM joined with Dubai World in the development of the Las Vegas Strip's CityCenter. When CityCenter opened in December 2009, it represented the largest single private development and the largest green project ever undertaken in the nation's history and America's number one generator of new jobs during the Great Recession. Senator Harry Reid said, "The Las Vegas community may never be able to express its appreciation adequately for all that Jim has done, but his hard work hasn't gone unnoticed. ... He is a leader of his generation in job creation, green investment and philanthropy." Somer Hollingsworth, President and CEO of the Nevada Development Authority, called CityCenter "the most exciting and impactful project to open for the foreseeable future." Under Murren's leadership, MGM broke ground on May 1, 2014, on another major project in Las Vegas: a privately financed, state-of-the-art, 20,000-seat Las Vegas Arena that was developed with sports and entertainment company AEG.

=== 2013-2026: Recent roles and MGM ===
Murren has been chair of the American Gaming Association Board of Directors, and is a member of the board of trustees of the Brookings Institution. In 2013, he was named executive chairman of the board of directors of the Corporate Responsibility Officers Association. He was named by President Obama to serve on the National Infrastructure Advisory Council.

He was recognized as Executive of the Year by Casino Journal in 2013.

During 2011, according to Forbes, Murren's total remuneration from MGM was $9.9 million, including $2 million in salary.

Under Murren, MGM purchased the San Antonio Stars of the WNBA in 2017 and relocated them to Las Vegas as the Las Vegas Aces.

On February 12, 2020, MGM Resorts International announced Murren resigned as chairman and CEO.

== Other interests ==
Over the years, he has been a pioneer in the area of corporate diversity. Among the company's management ranks, more than 38 percent are minorities and nearly 43 percent are women. During Murren's tenure as chairman & CEO, the company has continued to garner wide recognition for its leading diversity and inclusion initiatives, such as: 40 Best Companies for Diversity (Black Enterprise Magazine), Top 10 Companies for Latinos (DiversityInc Magazine), Best Places to Work for LGBT Equality (Human Rights Campaign Foundation), Top 10 Regional Companies (DiversityInc), Top 100 Companies for MBA Students (Universum Global), and Top Corporation for Women's Business Enterprises (Women's Business Enterprise National Council). FORTUNE Magazine has named MGM Resorts one of the World's Most Admired Companies.

Corporate Responsibility (CR) Magazine, a publication which recognizes America's most socially responsible chief executives, named Murren a 2013 Responsible CEO of the Year Award winner. The annual awards are presented to CEOs across industries that clearly exceed standards in the areas of employee relations, environmental impact, human rights, philanthropy, and corporate responsibility practices. In 2015, he was the recipient of the Distinguished Leader Award by the University of Massachusetts' Isenberg School of Management.

He and his wife co-founded the Nevada Cancer Institute and actively support Trinity College, Johns Hopkins University, the Fisher House Foundation for veterans and military families, and other non-profit organizations. He is a member of the national Business Roundtable and serves as an executive in residence at Johns Hopkins University's Carey Business School. He and his wife Heather Murren founded the Murren Family Foundation, a non-profit dedicated to veterans and education.
