= Elizabeth S. Wiskemann =

Elizabeth S. Wiskemann is the widow of Martin Wiskemann, a Swiss businessman who made his fortune managing a precious metal fund. Elizabeth Wiskemann closely guards her privacy, and as a result is the only member of the Forbes 400 who is of unknown age. Wiskemann owns 6% of Franklin Resources.
