= Heather Miller =

Heather Miller may refer to:

- Heather Miller (businessperson) (born 1966), American businesswoman
- Heather Miller (heptathlete) (born 1987), American athlete
- Heather Miller (sprinter) (born 1976), American sprinter, 1998 All-American for the Stanford Cardinal track and field team
