= ClearBridge Investments =

American investment firm

ClearBridge Investments, LLC
- Formerly: Citigroup Asset Management
- Type: Subsidiary
- Industry: Investment Management
- Founded: 1962; 64 years ago
- Headquarters: One Madison Avenue, New York City, US
- Key people: Terrence Murphy (CEO)
- AUM: US$193.3 billion (September 2024)
- Number of employees: 285 (2024)
- Parent: Franklin Templeton Investments
- Website: clearbridge.com

ClearBridge Investments (ClearBridge) is an equities focused asset management firm headquartered in New York City. It was previously the asset management unit of Citigroup until 2005 when it was rebranded as ClearBridge Investments. Currently it is a subsidiary of Franklin Templeton Investments.

== History ==
ClearBridge traces its origins to several individual asset management firms with the earliest being established in 1962. These firms include the asset management units of Smith Barney, Loeb, Rhoades & Co, Shearson and Salomon Brothers. After a series of mergers, all of these firms became part of Citigroup which was formed in 1998. The asset management units under Citigroup were merged to form its asset management unit, Citigroup Asset Management.

In 2005, Citigroup and Legg Mason performed an asset swap worth $3.7 billion. Citigroup would give Citigroup Asset Management to Legg Mason in exchange for Legg Mason's broker-dealer business. After the transaction was completed, Legg Mason rebranded Citigroup Asset Management to ClearBridge Investments.

In 2007, the Dolan Family attempted to take Cablevision private for $10.6 billion but ClearBridge, the largest shareholder, opposed it and eventually the bid was rejected by shareholders.

In 2013, the Legg Mason Capital Management division that was previously headed by Bill Miller was integrated into ClearBridge.

In 2020, ClearBridge became a subsidiary of Franklin Templeton Investments after its parent company, Legg Mason was acquired by Franklin Templeton Investments.
