= Mason School of Business =

Business school of the College of William & Mary

Coordinates: 37.2663°N 76.7183°W

The Raymond A. Mason School of Business
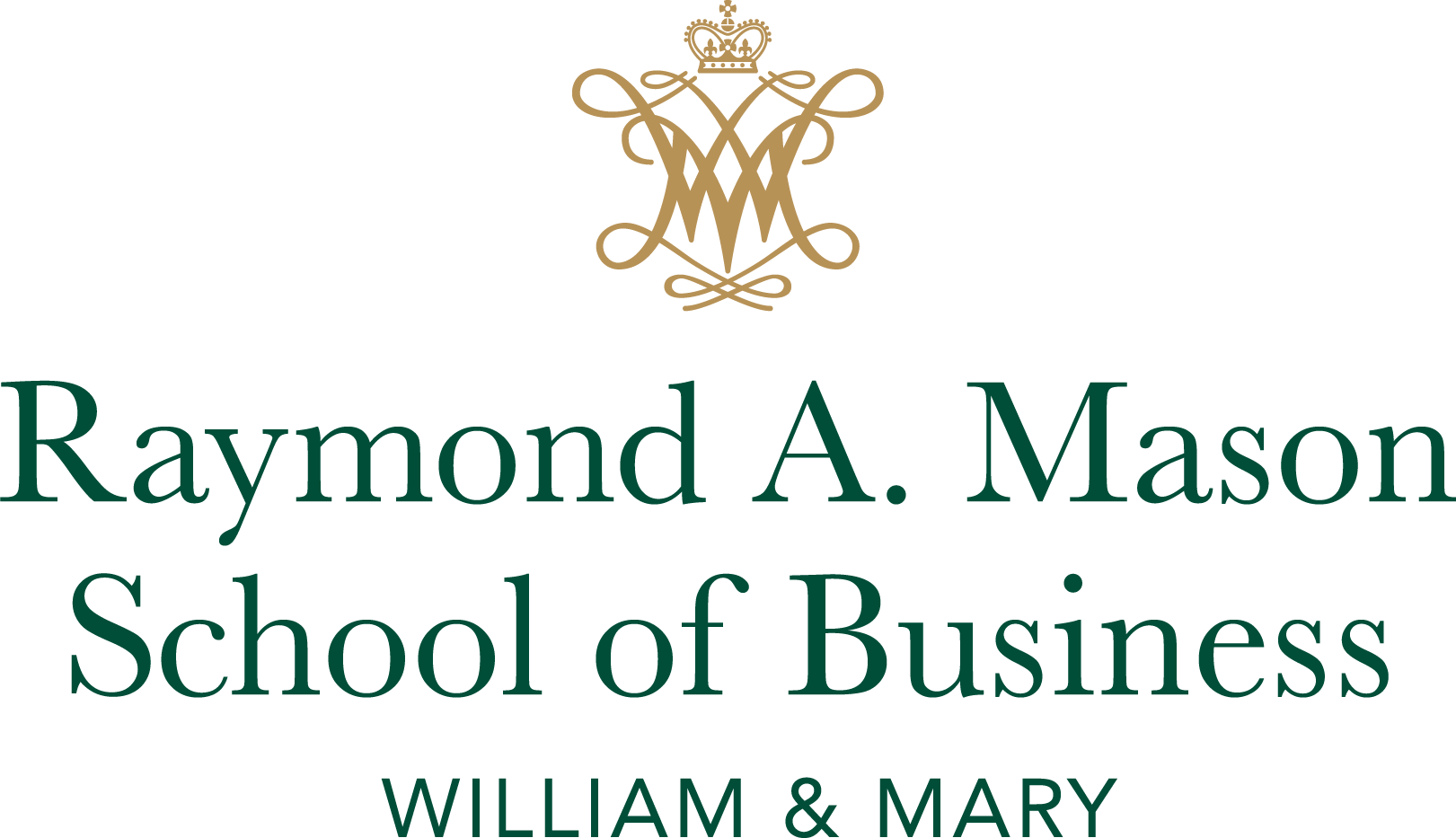
- Type: Public
- Established: 1968
- Parent institution: College of William & Mary
- Dean: Todd Mooradian
- Undergraduates: 500
- Postgraduates: 1,100
- Location: Williamsburg, Virginia, USA
- Website: mason.wm.edu

Business school rankings

U.S. MBA Rankings
- Bloomberg (2025): 36

Global MBA Rankings
- FT (2026): 76

The Raymond A. Mason School of Business is the business school of William & Mary, a public research university in Williamsburg, Virginia. Named in honor of alumnus and founder of Legg Mason, Raymond A. "Chip" Mason, the school offers a range of undergraduate and graduate business programs. It is accredited by the Association to Advance Collegiate Schools of Business (AACSB).

== History ==
Business education at William & Mary began in 1919 when President Julian A.C. Chandler established the Department of Business as part of efforts to broaden the university's academic offerings. The department evolved into the School of Business in 1968, and in 1971 the Board of Visitors approved the approved the addition of the Bachelor of Business Administration (BBA) undergraduate degree. The Master of Business Administration (MBA) program was launched in 1966.

In 2005, the school was named the Raymond A. Mason School of Business following a significant gift from its namesake. Since then, the school has expanded its graduate programs and invested in new facilities, including the completion of Alan B. Miller Hall in 2009.

== Campus and Facilities ==
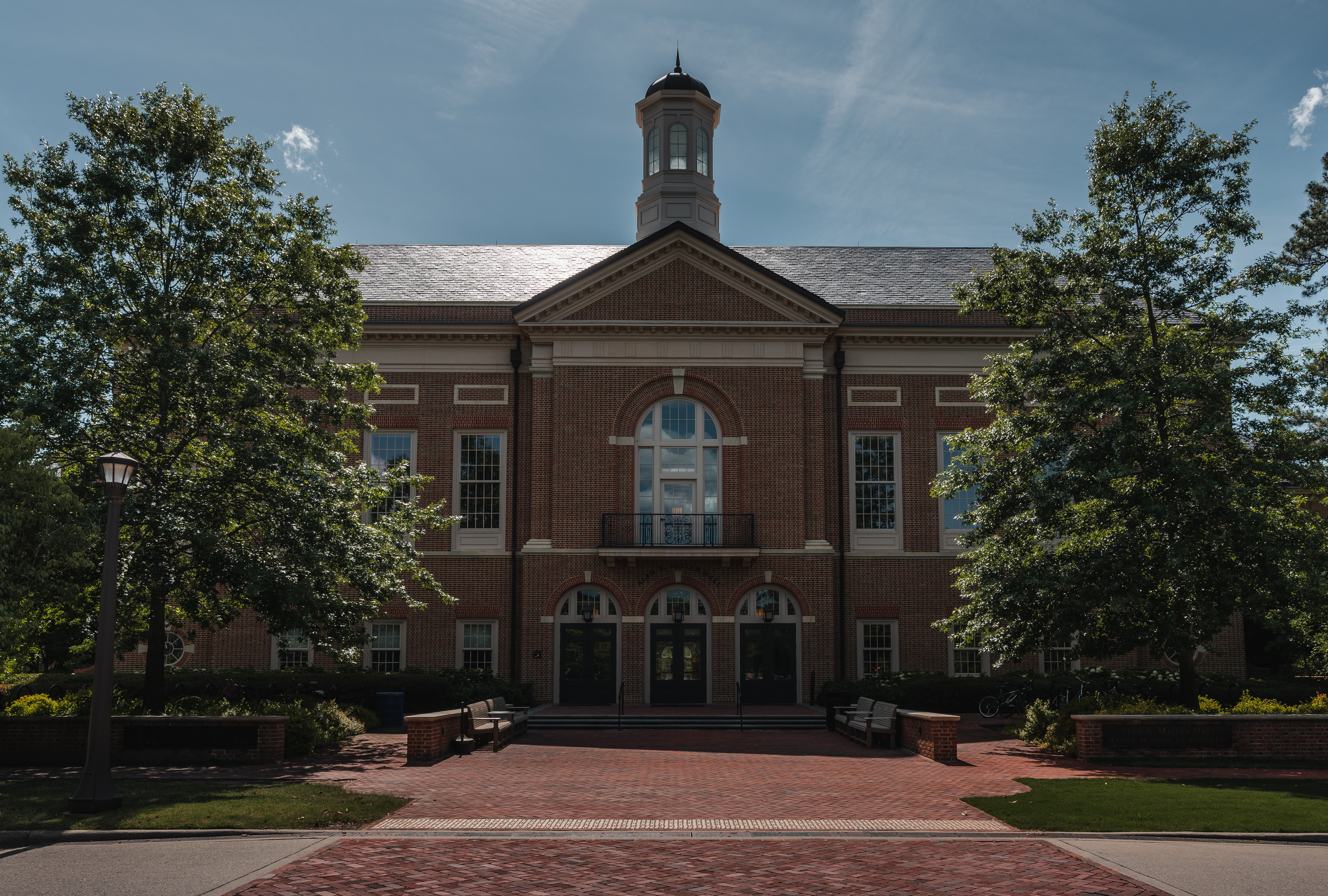
Alan B. Miller Hall

The Raymond A. Mason School of Business is located in Alan B. Miller Hall at the intersection of Ukrop Way and Jamestown Road, on the western edge of William & Mary's campus. Completed in 2009, the 166,000-square-foot building was designed in the Georgian architectural style by Robert A.M. Stern Architects.

== Academics ==
=== Undergraduate ===
The Bachelor's in Business Administration program (BBA) is a two-year program for William & Mary undergraduates. Students can major in Accounting, Business Analytics, Finance, or Marketing. Additional concentrations are available in Consulting, Entrepreneurship, Management, Supply Chain Analytics, and Sustainability. William & Mary students majoring in a field of study outside of the Mason School of Business may also apply to minor in Accounting, Business Analytics, Innovation & Entrepreneurship, Finance, Global Business, Management, Marketing, or Supply Chain Analytics in addition to their non-business major course of study. Non-business majors may also pursue minors in subjects such as Global Business, Innovation and Entrepreneurship and Business Analytics.

=== Graduate programs ===
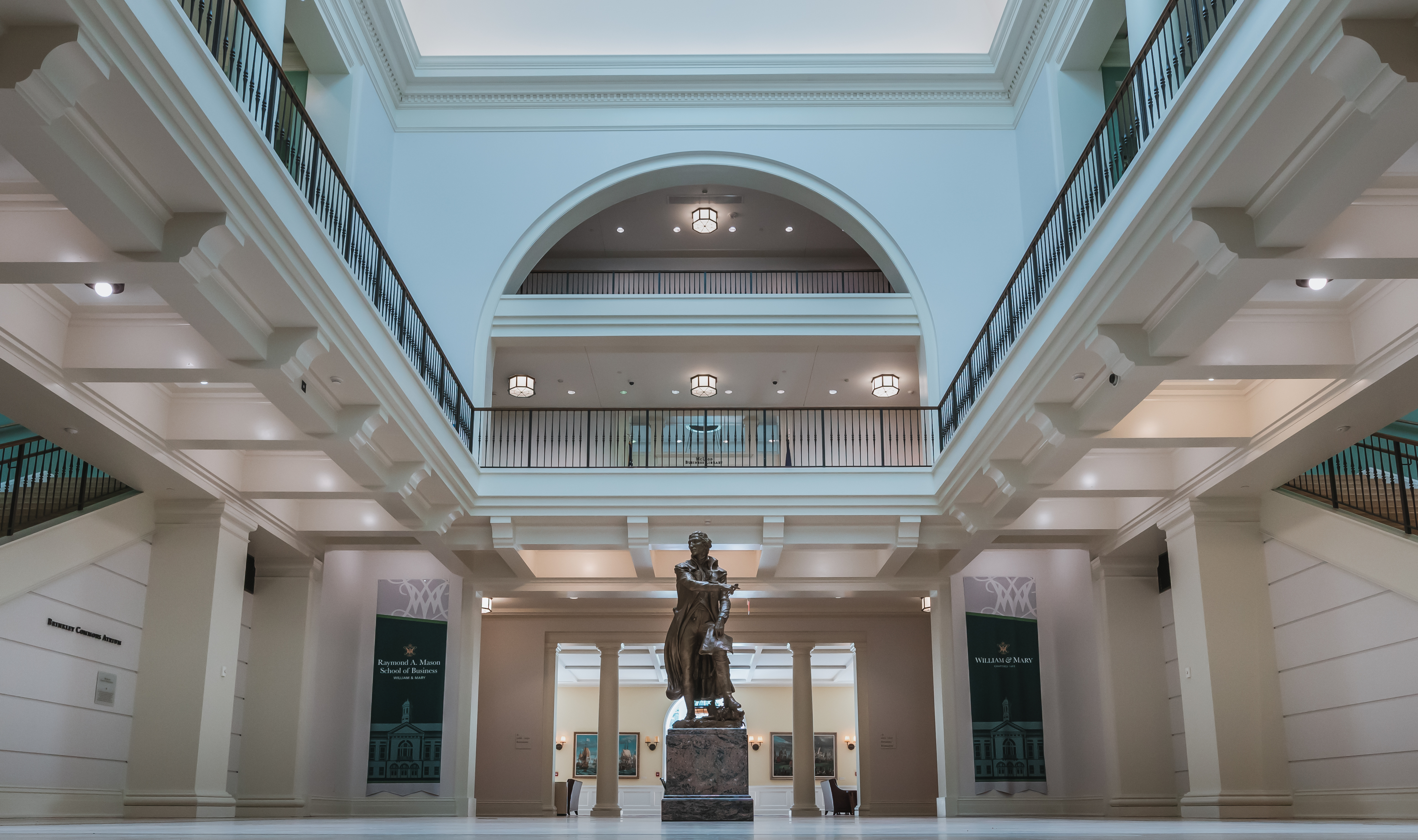
Miller Hall Atrium

==== Full-Time MBA ====
The Full-Time MBA program, is a 22-month program offering tracks in entrepreneurship, finance, general management, marketing, information technology and operations. The program includes a speaker series, corporate visits, case competitions and student-organized events.

==== Part-Time MBA ====
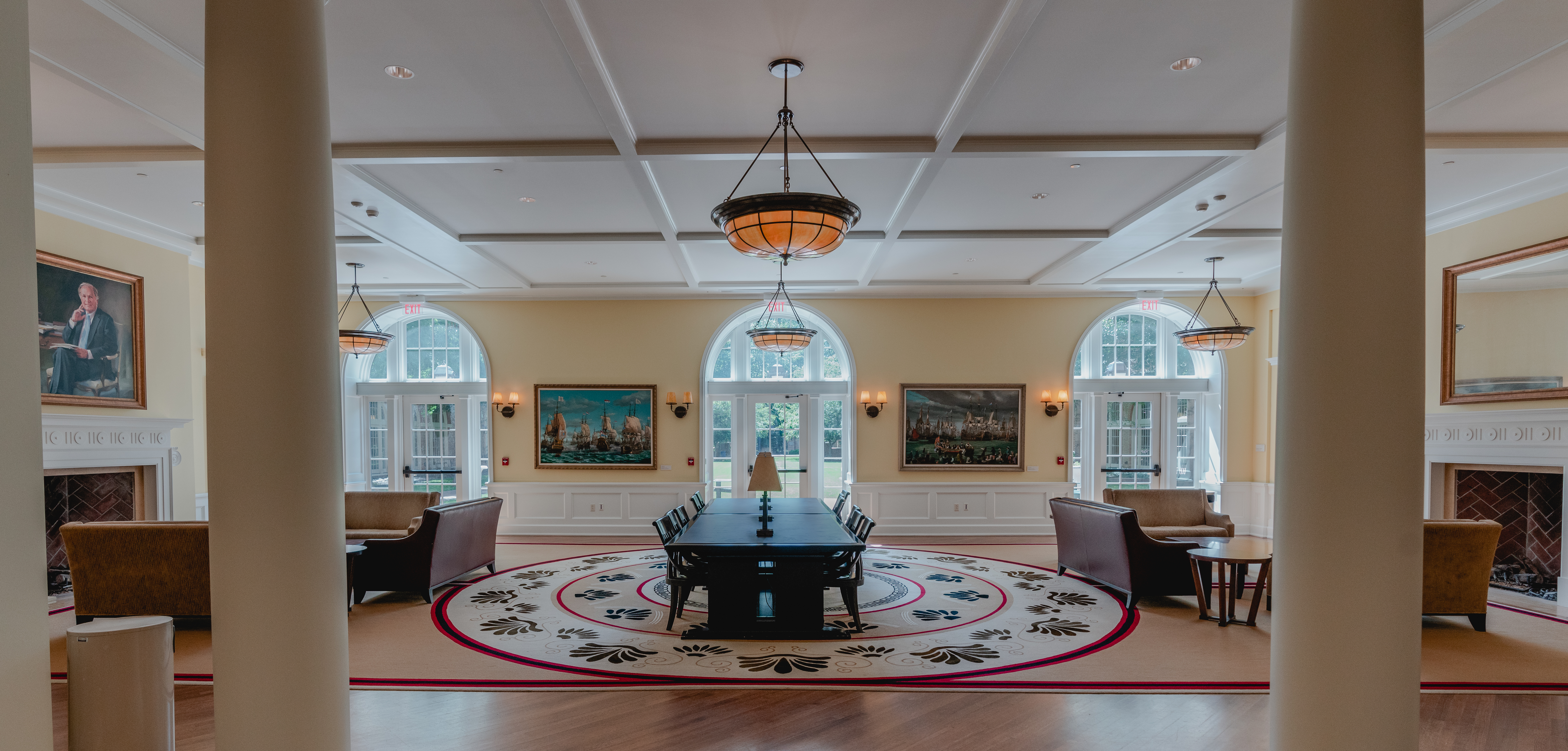
Student Lounge

Launched in 1985 (originally called the Flex MBA), this program is designed for working professionals. Classes are held once per week in the evening at the William & Mary Peninsula Center in Newport News.

==== Executive MBA ====
Established in 1986, this 18-month program targets senior professionals and executives. Courses are delivered on-campus at Miller Hall twice monthly on Fridays and Saturdays, with some summer coursework completed online.

==== Masters in Accounting ====
A one-year program that prepares students for the CPA exam and careers in public accounting. It is offered on-campus at Miller Hall.

==== Master of Science in Business Analytics ====
A one-year specialized program focusing on data-driven decision-making, offered on-campus.

==== Online Graduate Programs & Graduate Certificates ====
Ranked by Bloomberg as the #1 Business School for Learning for 2025-26, the Mason School of Business offers several fully online graduate degree programs:

== Notable alumni ==
Name	Year	Notability	Ref.
Todd Boehly	1996	Co-founder, Chairman, CEO and controlling member of Eldridge Industries; Co-owner of Premier League football club Chelsea	
Lewis Glucksman	1945	Wall Street trader; former CEO of Lehman Brothers	
Todd Howard	1993	Executive producer and game director of Bethesda Softworks	
Raymond A. Mason	1959	Founder and CEO of investment firm Legg Mason, Inc.; namesake of William & Mary's Mason School of Business	
C. Michael Petters	1993	President and CEO of Huntington Ingalls Industries	
Joe Plumeri	1966	Chairman & CEO of Willis Group Holdings, and owner of the Trenton Thunder; namesake of William & Mary's Plumeri Park	
Paul C. Saville	1977	President and CEO of NVR, Inc.	
Pete Snyder	1994	CEO of Disruptor Capital, Founder of New Media Strategies	
Jeffrey Trammell	1973	Past President of W&M's Board of Visitors, founded Trammell and Company	
Walter J. Zable	1937	Cubic Corporation Director, Chairman of the Board, President and CEO since 1951; namesake of the school's Walter J. Zable Stadium	

== See also ==
- List of United States business school rankings
- List of business schools in the United States
