= Pletcher =

Pletcher is a surname. Notable people with the surname include:

- David M. Pletcher (1920–2004), American historian
- John Pletcher, American major general
- Todd Pletcher (born 1967), American thoroughbred trainer

== See also ==
- Fletcher (surname)
- Pletcher, Alabama, an unincorporated community
