= C. Michael Petters =

Mike Petters
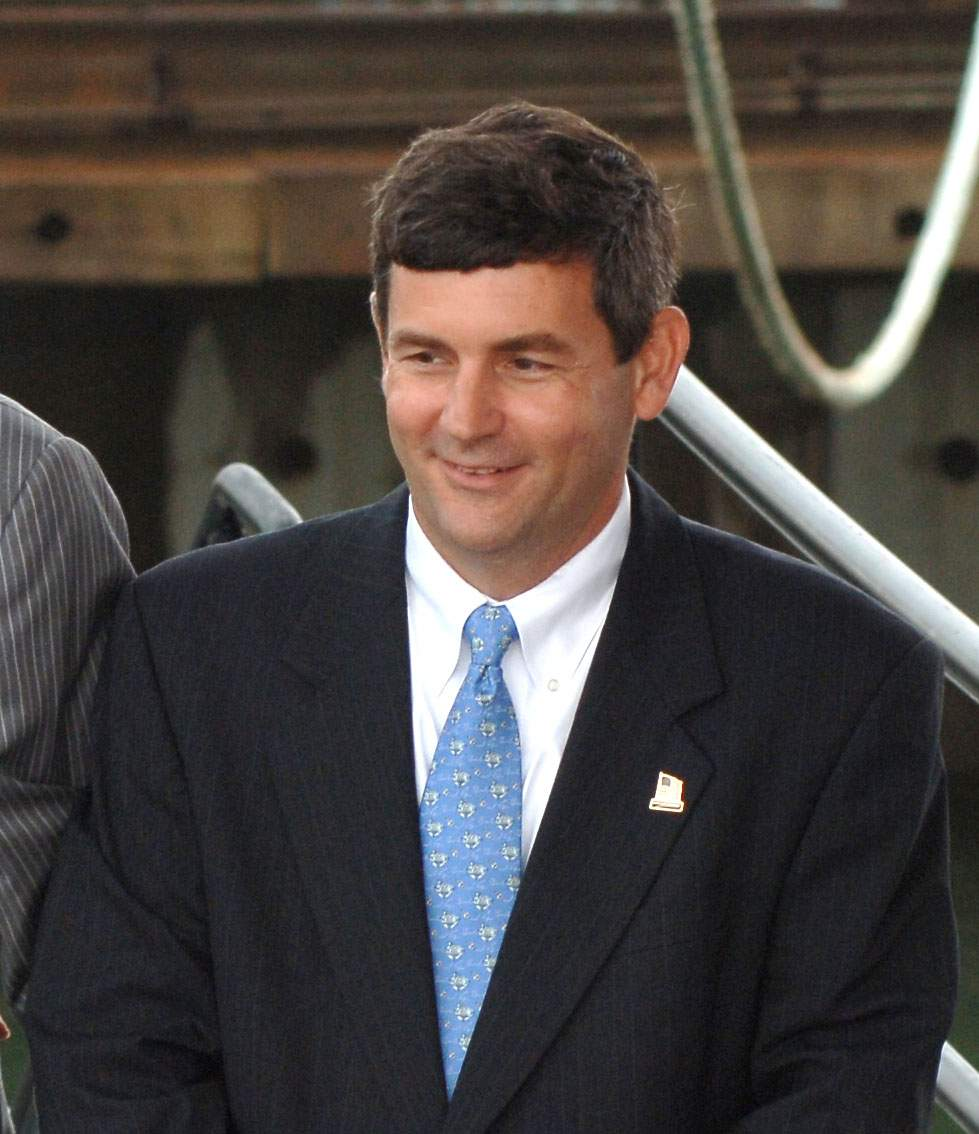
- Born: Clement Michael Petters; 1959 (age 66–67)
- Education: United States Naval Academy (BS); Mason School of Business (MBA)

Clement Michael Petters ("Mike", born 1959) is president and CEO of Huntington Ingalls Industries, an American military shipbuilding company.

== Career ==
Petters assumed his role as president and CEO on March 31, 2011. He is also a member of the Huntington Ingalls Industries board of directors. From 2008 until his appointment in 2011, he was the president of Northrop Grumman Shipbuilding. Prior to this position, he was the president of Northrop Grumman's Newport News sector. Petters first came to Newport News Shipbuilding in 1987 in their Los Angeles-class submarine construction division. He held a number of positions that included being the production supervisor for submarines, the marketing manager for submarines and carriers.

== Board and advisory positions ==
Petters is the vice chairman of the Virginia Business Council. He is on the board of directors for the US Naval Academy Foundation and also for the National Bureau of Asian Research. He is on the board of trustees for the Naval Aviation Museum Foundation. He is on the advisory council for the Naval Historical Foundation and he is on the distinguished advisory board for the Dolphin Scholarship Foundation.

== Background and education ==
Mike Petters grew up in the rural community of St. Joseph in northeastern Pasco County, Florida on a large orange and cattle farm, and was a 1977 graduate of Jesuit High School in Tampa. Petters earned bachelor's degree in physics from the US Naval Academy in 1982. Commissioned as an ensign in the U.S. Navy, he qualified as a Submarine Warfare Officer.

He has a master's degree in business administration from the Mason School of Business at the College of William and Mary.
