= Western Asset Management Company =

Finance company in California

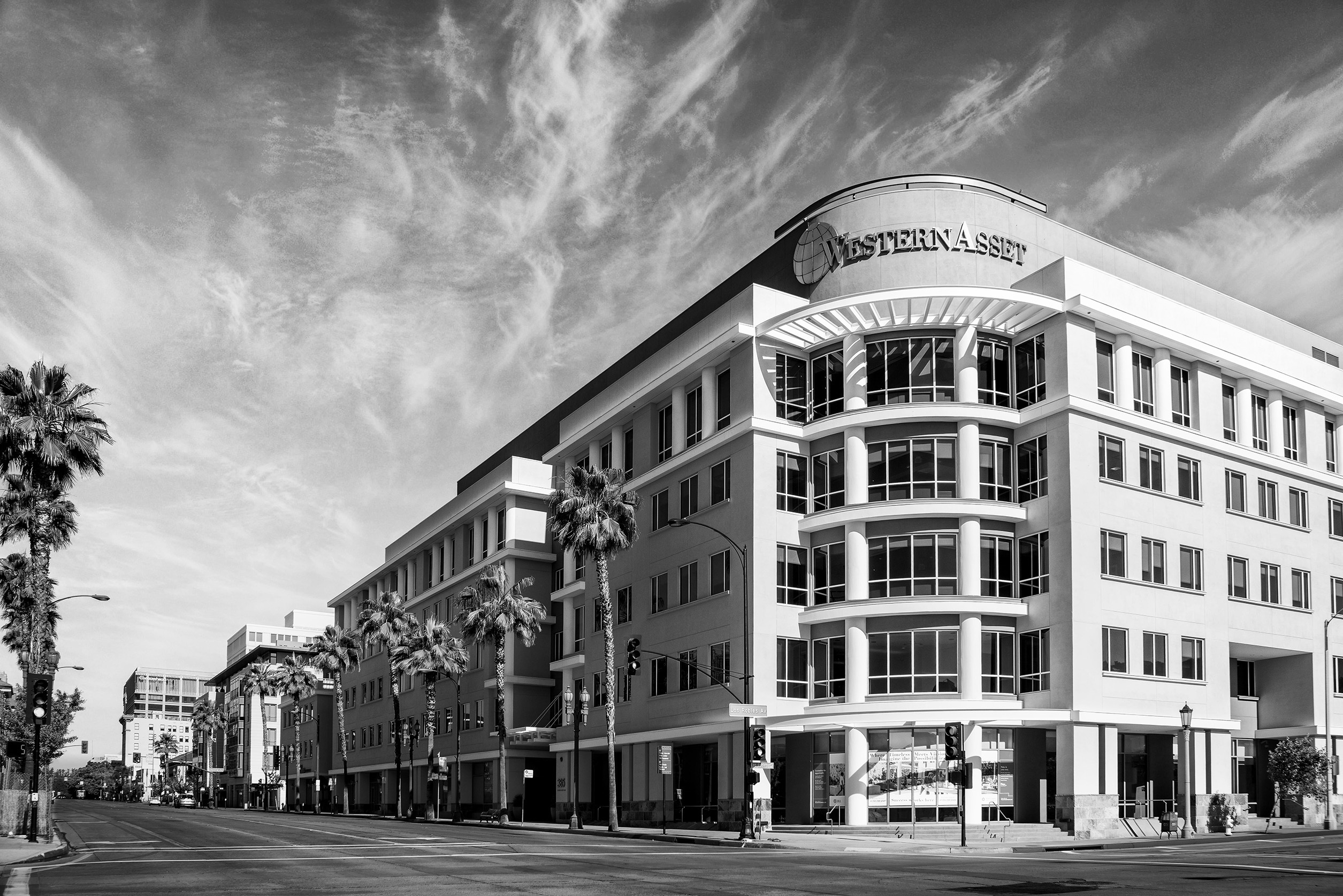
- Headquarters at Pasadena
- Type: Subsidiary
- Industry: Investment management
- Founded: 1971
- Headquarters: Pasadena, California, United States
- Key people: James W. Hirschmann III (CEO); Michael C. Buchanan (Chief Investment Officer)
- Products: Asset management, Fixed income, Money market, Alternative investments, Closed-end funds, Open-end funds, Corporate bonds, High-yield debt, Government bonds, Municipal bonds
- AUM: US$381.1 billion (as of 30 June 2024)
- Parent: Franklin Templeton
- Website: www.westernasset.com

Western Asset Management Company is a global fixed-income investment firm headquartered in Pasadena, California, with nine offices on five continents and $381.1 billion in assets under management as of June 30, 2024. The firm offers institutional and retail investors a broad range of core, sector-specific, and customized bond portfolios across every sector of the bond market. The company utilizes a team-based investment approach and has focused exclusively on fixed-income securities since its founding in 1971.

== History ==
=== Early years (1971-1986) ===
Western Asset Management Company was founded in October 1971 by United California Bank (which later became First Interstate), and became an SEC-registered investment advisor in December of that year. In December 1986, Western Asset was acquired by Legg Mason, Inc.

=== Expansion (1996-present) ===
In February 1996, Legg Mason acquired Lehman Brothers Global Asset Management Limited, based in London, to broaden Western Asset's non-dollar capabilities. Now known as Western Asset Management Company Limited, it operates as the firm’s London office. To enhance its presence in Asia, Western Asset Management Company Pte. Ltd. was established in Singapore.

In December 2003, the fixed-income division of Rothschild Asset Management (Singapore) Limited was acquired by Legg Mason and merged into the existing operation. To further develop Western Asset's capabilities and global presence, Legg Mason acquired a substantial part of Citigroup's asset management business in exchange for its brokerage and capital markets business. As part of the transaction, Western Asset gained new offices in New York, São Paulo, Hong Kong, Tokyo and Melbourne, in addition to related staff and assets.

In July 2020, Franklin Templeton acquired Legg Mason, making Western Asset Management one of Franklin Templeton's Specialist Investment Managers.

=== Investment Scandal (2024) ===
In November 2024, the Securities and Exchange Commission announced fraud charges against Ken Leech, a Co-Chief Investment Officer of Western Asset Management. The charges accused Leech of "engaging in a multi-year scheme to allocate favorable trades to certain portfolios, while allocating unfavorable trades to other portfolios, a practice known as cherry-picking."
