= Clarion Partners =

American real estate investment firm

Clarion Partners, LLC
- Formerly: Jones Lang Wootton Realty Advisors; ING Clarion
- Type: Subsidiary
- Industry: Private equity real estate
- Founded: 1982; 44 years ago
- Founders: Stephen Furnary; John Weisz; Frank Sullivan
- Headquarters: 230 Park Avenue; New York City; U.S.
- Number of locations: 10 offices
- Key people: David Gilbert (CEO)
- AUM: US$83.5 billion (Q3 2022)
- Number of employees: 297 (2022)
- Parent: Franklin Templeton Investments
- Website: www.clarionpartners.com

Clarion Partners ("Clarion") is an American real estate investment firm headquartered in New York City. The firm is the real estate asset management platform of Franklin Templeton Investments. In 2022, IREI ranked Clarion as the eighth largest real estate investment manager in North America based on assets under management.

== Background ==
The firm was founded in 1982 by Stephen Furnary and John Weisz who previously worked at Citibank's real estate investment management group. Frank Sullivan who was also from Citibank joined them shortly after it was formed. When it was incorporated, it operated under the name Jones Lang Wootton Realty Advisors (JLWRA) as Jones Lang Wootton was a corporate partner.

During that period, real estate investment was mostly by large private institutions related to Banks and Insurance companies. The aim of the firm was to allow investors the opportunity to work with smaller and more nimble organizations.

In 1995, the founders bought out Jones Lang's interest in the firm and renamed it to Clarion Partners.

In 1998, ING Group acquired Clarion and the firm's brand name changed to ING Clarion.

In 2011, Lightyear Capital partnered with Clarion's management to acquire Clarion from ING for $100 million.

In 2016, Lightyear Capital sold Clarion to Legg Mason for $585 million.

In 2021, Franklin Templeton Investments acquired Legg Mason for $4.5 billion. As Clarion was a subsidiary under Legg Mason, it has now become a subsidiary under Franklin Templeton Investments.

On September 11, 2005, Co-founder Weisz died. On May 13, 2014, Co-founder Sullivan retired from the firm. On April 17, 2017, the final co-founder, Furnary retired from the firm but still remained Executive chairman and passed on operational duties to the new CEO, David Gilbert.

== Investments ==
Most of Clarion's real estate investments are based in North America.

- 1201 Third Avenue
- 1600 Seventh Avenue
- American Stock Exchange Building
- Burlington Center Mall
- Constitution Center
- Old Palm Golf Club
- West Hollywood Gateway
