= Charles Bailyn =

American scientist

- Born: October 27, 1959 (age 66); Cambridge, Massachusetts, United States
- Education: Yale University (BS); Harvard University (PhD)
- Awards: Trumpler Award (1990); Bruno Rossi Prize (2009)
- Scientific career
- Fields: Astronomy, Physics & Higher Education
- Workplaces: Harvard University; Yale University; Yale-NUS College

Charles David Bailyn (born October 27, 1959) is the A. Bartlett Giamatti Professor of Astronomy and Physics at Yale University and inaugural dean of faculty at Yale-NUS College.

== Education ==
He earned a B.S. in astronomy and physics from Yale in 1981 and a Ph.D. in astronomy from Harvard in 1987. His Ph.D. thesis on X-ray emitting binary stars received the Robert J. Trumpler Award for best North American Ph.D. thesis in astronomy.

== Career ==
=== Early career ===
After earning his PhD in 1987, Bailyn was selected as a Fellow with the Harvard Society of Fellows and served there until becoming an assistant professor with Yale University in 1990. Bailyn was promoted to associate professor in 1996 and made a full professor in 1998.

Bailyn's research interests include high-energy astronomy and galactic astronomy and he has published over 100 referred papers.

During spring 2007, Bailyn recorded ASTR 160, Frontiers and Controversies in Astrophysics, as part of the Open Yale Courses initiative. Bailyn also recorded three updates to the course more than five years later on the subjects of extra-solar planets, black holes, and dark energy.

On July 6, 2016, Yale announced that Bailyn would become the first head of the new Benjamin Franklin College, which opened in 2017.

== Recognition ==
Bailyn was awarded the 2009 Bruno Rossi Prize for his research on the masses of black holes.

== Family ==
His father was historian Bernard Bailyn, and his mother is social psychologist Lotte Bailyn.
