= Charles B. Johnson =

American billionaire businessman

- Born: January 6, 1933 (age 93); Montclair, New Jersey, U.S.
- Education: Yale University
- Occupation: Businessman
- Spouse: Ann Demarest Lutes
- Children: 7, including Greg and Jenny
- Relatives: Rupert Johnson Jr. (brother)

Charles Bartlett Johnson (born January 6, 1933) is an American billionaire businessman, with an estimated current net worth of around $6.1 billion. He was chief executive officer of Franklin Templeton Investments from 1957 to 2004. He is a Republican megadonor and majority owner of the San Francisco Giants.

== Early life ==
Charles Bartlett Johnson was born in 1933 in Montclair, New Jersey, to Rupert Harris Johnson and Florence Endler. His father and mother divorced during his childhood, leaving Charles to live with his mother and four siblings. His father's second marriage produced Rupert Jr., Charles' later business partner, and two other half-siblings.

Johnson attended Montclair High School, and then Yale College, where he graduated in 1954. At Yale he played offensive guard for the football team and waited dining hall tables as a scholarship student. An ROTC cadet, he later served as a lieutenant in the United States Army stationed in Germany.

== Career ==
Johnson and his brother, Rupert Johnson Jr., worked at Franklin Resources, a mutual fund company started by Rupert Sr. (their father) in 1947. In 1957, at the age of 24, he became chief executive officer. He remained at the company for 56 years, and took the company public in 1971. Following talks with Sir John Templeton in 1991, the company acquired Templeton, Galbraith & Hansberger Ltd. for $913 million in 1992, and was thereafter sometimes called Franklin Templeton Investments, overseeing variety of mutual funds. Johnson stepped down as chairman in June 2013 was succeeded by his son Greg Johnson. Charles Johnson's daughter Jennifer was appointed chief executive officer in 2019.

Johnson is largest shareholder of the San Francisco Giants, owning 26% of the Major League Baseball team. Johnson purchased his share of the Giants in 1992 along with Peter Magowan and Larry Baer. He is not involved in the day-to-day operations of the franchise; Baer is the President and chief executive officer of the franchise, and the chairman is Greg Johnson.

== Donations to Yale University and other philanthropy ==
Johnson is one of his alma mater's largest benefactors, having given considerable sums to athletic and student facilities at Yale. Johnson Field, used for field hockey, was opened in 2001. In 2005, he was the principal donor to a renovation of the Yale Bowl. Johnson has also funded academic programs, including the Johnson Center for the Study of American Diplomacy and Brady–Johnson Program in Grand Strategy.

In September 2013, Yale president Peter Salovey announced that Johnson had given $250 million to support the construction of two new residential colleges costing $400 million. The gift was the largest in Yale's history in nominal terms. One of the new Yale residential colleges was named Benjamin Franklin College.

== Political donations ==
Johnson is one of the largest donors to Republican and Tea-Party-backed political campaigns. From 2000 to mid-2015, he has contributed over $900,000 to the campaigns of Mitt Romney, John Boehner, and Ben Quayle. In 2015, Johnson donated $1 million to a super PAC supporting the presidential candidacy of Jeb Bush. From 2017 through 2018, Johnson and his wife Ann ranked 14th among the largest donors to Republican causes and candidates, donating over $4.58 million during this period.

In 2018, Johnson and his wife, Ann, each donated $2,700 to the campaign of Cindy Hyde-Smith, a Republican U.S. Senator from Mississippi facing Mike Espy, an African-American Democratic candidate, in a runoff election. On the campaign trail, a video surfaced showing Hyde-Smith tell a local rancher, "If he invited me to a public hanging, I'd be on the front row"; the remark was criticized, especially given Mississippi's history of lynchings. After the donation was questioned, Johnson criticized Hyde-Smith's comment as "stupid" and "offensive" but said that he "had no issue with Hyde-Smith being photographed in a Confederate hat."

Also in 2018, Johnson donated $1000 to Black Americans for the President's Agenda, a pro-Donald Trump super PAC. After the super PAC released a racist radio ad, Johnson said that the ad was "unacceptable" and that "I had absolutely no knowledge that this donation would be used in this manner and I, like the Giants organization, strongly condemn any form of racism and in no way condone the advertisement that was created by this entity."

Together with his spouse, Johnson contributed $700,000 to Donald Trump's 2020 presidential campaign.

Johnson also donated to the campaign of Lauren Boebert which sparked controversy after Boebert appeared to be aiding rioters in the United States Capitol on January 6, 2021. In addition to Boebert, Johnson donated to at least 11 other Republican congressional candidates, including Tommy Tuberville, Tom Cotton, and Kelly Loeffler. After scrutiny of his donations to Boebert and others, Johnson stated that he would request a refund from Boebert and some other candidates, and that he would "do my part in helping to heal our nation and restore peace and respect in our democratic system." However, weeks after releasing this statement, Johnson donated $5,000 (the maximum permitted amount) to a right-wing extremist PAC, Elbert Guillory's America.

During the 2022 election cycle, Johnson donated to many Republican candidates, including far-right conspiracy theorist John Gibbs (who lost his bid for a congressional seat in Michigan) as well as 2020 election deniers, including Herschel Walker (contributing $100,000 to 34N22, a super PAC dedicated to supporting Walker, as well as $2,900 to Walker's campaign). Johnson also donated to other candidates who denied the 2020 election results or promoted baseless conspiracy theories about the election, including Adam Laxalt, Ron Johnson, Lauren Boebert, and Scott Perry.

It has been reported that Johnson has donated $2.6 million to the Republican Party for the 2026 election cycle, the most amongst Major League Baseball owners.

== Personal life ==
Johnson lives in Palm Beach, Florida. Charles is married to Ann, and they have six children (a seventh is deceased). His son, Greg Johnson, is executive chairman at Franklin Resources, and his daughter Jennifer M. Johnson is the chief executive officer. Johnson rarely gives interviews.

In 2009, Johnson and his wife bought the Carolands Chateau, a large historic mansion in Hillsborough, California, for $26 million. By 2023, it was appraised at $130 million. In 2012, Johnson and his wife donated Carolands Chateau to his private foundation, "Carolands Foundation". The couple filed for tax-exempt status for the mansion, as they said that the mansion would be open to self-guided public tours every weekday from 9–5. By valuing the mansion so highly and by obtaining tax-exempt status, the Johnsons collected more than $38 million in tax savings from the estate over five years. However, the mansion was not open to the public 40 hours per week and was not subject to self-guided tours. Rather, it was only open to a few dozen lottery winners who could access the mansion on a guided tour for two hours from 1PM on most Wednesdays. Tax and legal experts questioned the validity of the high appraisal for the mansion and the tax-exempt status of the estate.

== See also ==
- Franklin Templeton Investments
