= Rupert Johnson Jr. =

American businessman

- Born: Rupert Harris Johnson Jr. 1941 (age 84–85)
- Education: Washington & Lee University
- Occupation: Businessman
- Spouse: Maryellie Johnson

Rupert Harris Johnson Jr. (born 1941) is an American billionaire businessman and philanthropist. He is the vice chairman of Franklin Resources, a global investment management firm also called Franklin Templeton Investments.

== Early life ==
Rupert Johnson was born in 1941, the son of Rupert Harris Johnson (1900–1989) and Amybelle Siler. His half brother, Charles, is the chairman at Franklin Resources.

Johnson graduated from Washington and Lee University, then served as a Marine.

== Career ==
In 1965, he joined his father at Franklin Resources, where he is vice chairman and director.

As of January 2020, Johnson is worth US$3.8 billion.

== Philanthropy ==
Johnson sits on the board of trustees at Santa Clara University and was on the board of trustees at Washington and Lee University (1993–2002). He gave $100 million to Washington and Lee in June 2007, establishing a merit-based financial aid and curriculum enrichment program.

Johnson has made donations to the Asian Art Museum of San Francisco and the Delaware Art Museum. He sits on the President's Council of the United Religions Initiative.

== Personal life ==
Johnson is married to Maryellie and lives in Burlingame, California.
