= James Peccia =

U.S. Air Force general

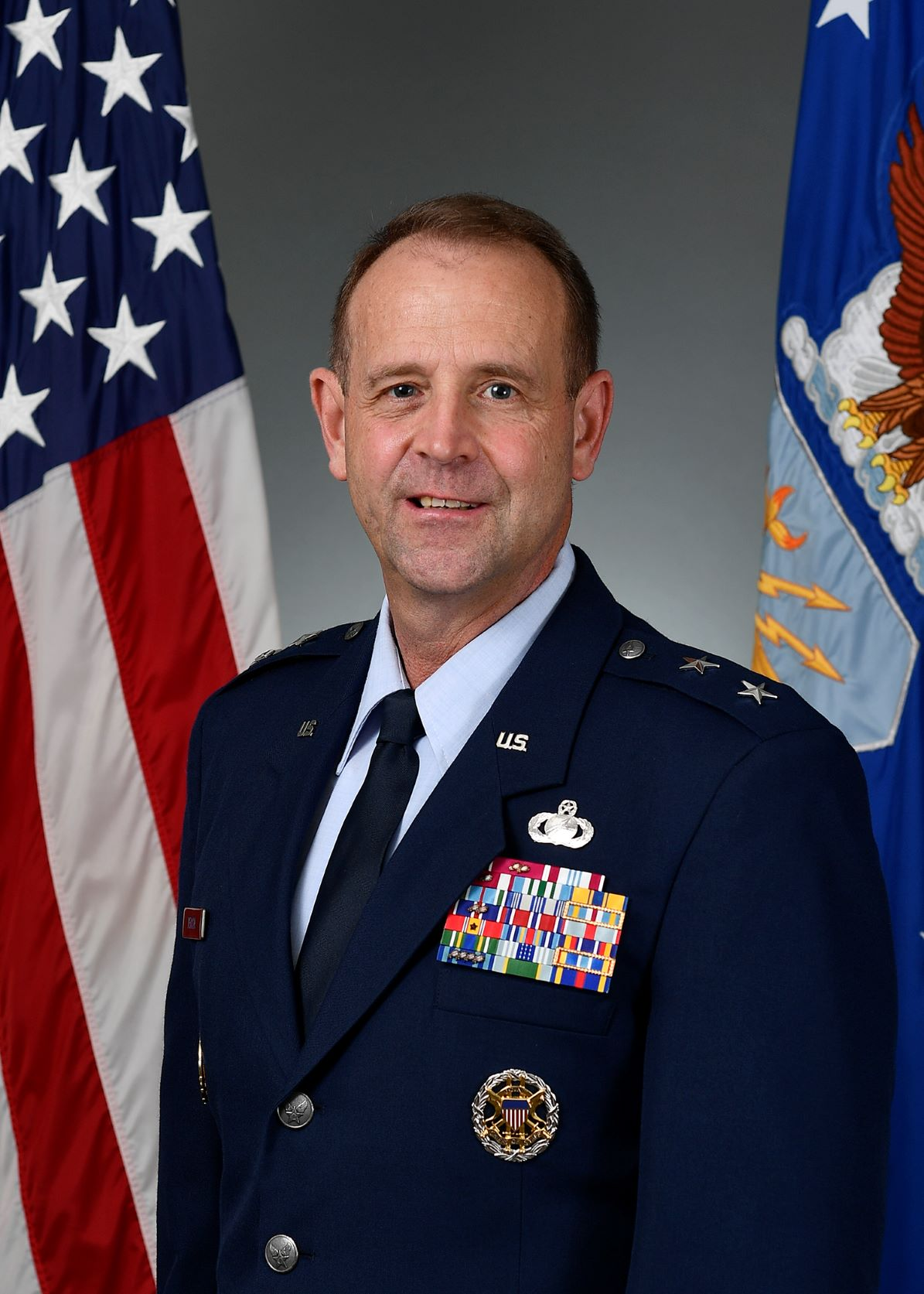
- Military career
- Allegiance: United States
- Branch: United States Air Force
- Service years: 1989–2022
- Rank: Major General
- Commands: 97th Mission Support Group; 366th Comptroller Squadron
- Awards: Legion of Merit (4)

James D. Peccia III is a retired United States Air Force major general who last served as the Deputy Assistant Secretary for Budget of the Office of the Assistant Secretary of the Air Force for Financial Management and Comptroller. Previously, he was the Director of Financial Management of the Air Force Materiel Command. He is the brother of Jordan Peccia, Thomas E. Golden Professor of Environmental Engineering at Yale University.

Military offices
Preceded by ???	Deputy Assistant Secretary for Budget of the Office of the Assistant Secretary of the Air Force for Financial Management and Comptroller; 2015–2017	Succeeded by Trent H. Edwards
Preceded by John Pletcher	Director of Financial Management of the Air Force Materiel Command; 2017–2020	Succeeded by Michael Greiner
Preceded by John Pletcher	Deputy Assistant Secretary for Budget of the Office of the Assistant Secretary of the Air Force for Financial Management and Comptroller; 2020–2022	Succeeded by Michael Greiner
