= Franklin Templeton =

American investment firm

Franklin Templeton, Inc.

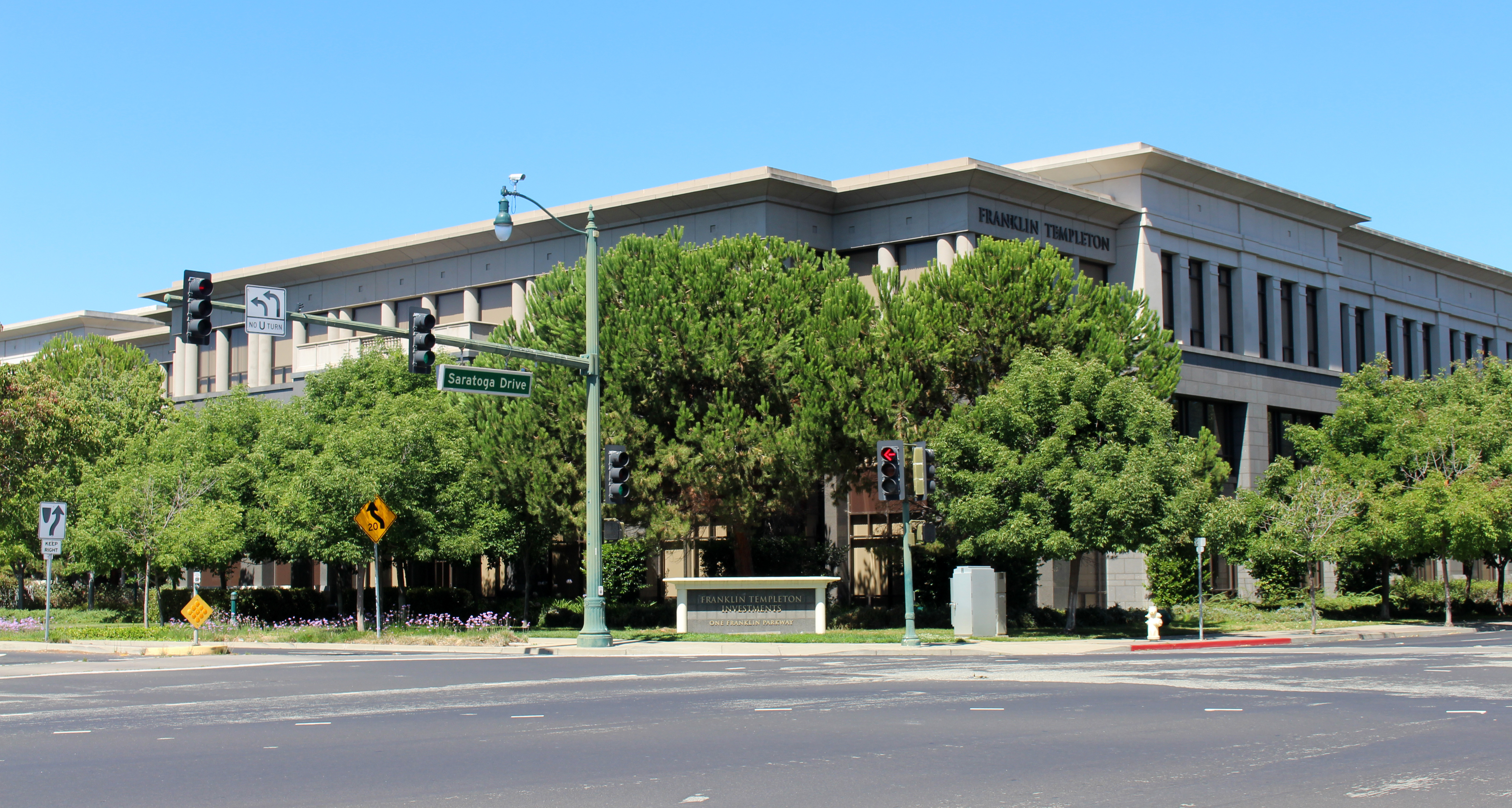
- Headquarters in San Mateo, California
- Trade name: Franklin Templeton
- Type: Public
- Traded as: NYSE: BEN; S&P 500 component
- Industry: Financial services Investment management
- Founded: 1947; 79 years ago in New York City, U.S.
- Founder: Rupert H. Johnson Sr.
- Headquarters: San Mateo, California, U.S.
- Key people: Jennifer M. Johnson (CEO); Gregory E. Johnson (executive chairman); Rupert H. Johnson Jr. (vice chairman)
- Products: Asset management; Wealth management; Alternative investment
- Revenue: ▲US$8.77 billion (2025)
- Operating income: ▲US$604 million (2025)
- Net income: ▲US$525 million (2025)
- AUM: ▼US$1.66 trillion (2025)
- Total assets: ▼US$32.4 billion (2025)
- Total equity: ▼US$12.1 billion (2025)
- Number of employees: 9,800 (2025)
- Subsidiaries: Clarion Partners; ClearBridge Investments; Fiduciary Trust Company International; K2 Advisors; Legg Mason; Lexington Partners; Putnam Investments; Royce Investment Partners; Western Asset Management Company
- Website: franklintempleton.com/corporate
- Footnotes; Financials as of September 30, 2025.

Franklin Templeton, Inc. is an American multinational investment management holding company that, together with its subsidiaries, is referred to as Franklin Templeton. It is a global investment firm with operations in over 150 countries. They were founded in New York City in 1947 as Franklin Distributors, Inc. In 1992 they merged with Templeton, Galbraith & Hansberger which had started in 1954 under John Templeton.

The company’s stock is listed on the New York Stock Exchange under the ticker symbol BEN, in honor of Benjamin Franklin, for whom the company is named, and who was admired by founder Rupert Johnson Sr.

In 1973, the company's headquarters moved from New York to San Mateo, California.

== History ==
The company was founded in 1947 in New York by Rupert H. (Harris) Johnson Sr. (1900–1989), who ran a successful retail brokerage firm from an office on Wall Street. He named the company for American polymath Benjamin Franklin because Franklin espoused frugality and prudence when it came to saving and investing. The company's first line of mutual funds, Franklin Custodian Funds, was a series of conservatively managed equity and bond funds designed to appeal to most investors.

After Rupert Sr. retired, his son, Charles B. Johnson (Charlie), took over as president and chief executive officer in 1957 at age 24. At that time, the funds had total assets under management of US$2.5 million. Rupert Johnson Jr., Charlie's brother, joined the company in 1965.

Franklin went public in 1971. In 1973, the company acquired Winfield & Company, a San Mateo, California-based investment firm, and moved Franklin's offices from New York to California. The combined organization had close to US$250 million in assets under management and approximately 60 employees. In 1979, Franklin Money Fund began a growth surge that made it Franklin's first billion-dollar fund and launched the company's significant asset growth in the 1980s.

Starting in 1980, the company's total assets under management doubled (or nearly doubled) every year for the next six years. The company's stock began trading on the New York Stock Exchange in 1986. In the same year, the company opened its first office outside North America in Taiwan. In 1988, Franklin acquired L.F. Rothschild Fund Management Company. Assets under management for Franklin grew from just over US$2 billion in 1982 to more than US$40 billion in 1989 (the crash of 1987 had little impact on Franklin's income and bond funds).

In October 1992, Franklin acquired Templeton, Galbraith & Hansberger Ltd. for a reported cost of $913 million, leading to the common name Franklin Templeton. Mutual fund pioneer Sir John Templeton was the owner of Templeton, Galbraith & Hansberger Ltd together with his son Dr. John Templeton and John Galbraith who together owned 70% of the firm.

In November 1996, Heine Securities Corporation, known for the Mutual Series of funds, merged into the Franklin Templeton complex. In October 2000, Franklin acquired Bissett Funds to increase its Canadian presence, and Bissett remains a key brand from Franklin in the Canadian market. The Fiduciary Trust Company was acquired by Franklin Templeton in April 2001.

Fiduciary Trust Company International, a member of the Franklin family, maintained an office of over 650 employees in 2 World Trade Center at the time of the September 11 attacks in 2001. 87 employees died in the collapse.

The firm has specialized expertise across a full range of asset classes. It offers products under the Franklin, Templeton, Mutual Series and Fiduciary brand names, among others. Like other large investment companies, the firm offers a wide variety of funds but is traditionally best known for bond funds under the Franklin brand, international funds under the Templeton brand, and value funds under the Mutual Series brand.

In April 2007, Franklin Resources was 445th in the Fortune 500, and 7th overall among securities companies. The same month, USA Today listed BEN stock as the top stock pick for the last 25 years based on returns, claiming it is up 64,224% since 1982. As of July 31, 2008, Franklin Resources, Inc. managed over $570 billion in total assets worldwide. In February 2009, Barron's Magazine called Franklin Templeton "King of the Decade" among fund families over the ten-year period ending in 2008.

In 2013, Charles Johnson retired as chairman and his son Greg Johnson became chairman of the board, CEO and president.

In 2019, the firm acquired Benefit Street Partners, an alternative credit investment group.

In 2020, Jenny Johnson became CEO and President of the firm and Greg Johnson became Executive chairman. In October 2025, Daniel Gamba, Terrence Murphy, and Matthew Nicholls were named Co-Presidents, continuing to report to Johnson as CEO.

Franklin Templeton acquired AdvisorEngine in May 2020, completing the deal in September 2022. Founded 2014 by Rich Cancro, the wealth management technology platform provides advisors with CRM, portfolio management, client portal, and digital onboarding tools, enhancing Franklin Templeton's digital wealth management offerings.

In July 2020, Franklin Templeton acquired Legg Mason, Inc., making Franklin Templeton one of the world's largest independent, specialized global investment managers, with a combined $1.4 trillion in assets under management (AUM). The combined footprint deepened Templeton's presence in key geographies and created an expansive investment platform that includes institutional and retail client AUM.

In November 2021, Franklin Templeton announced its acquisition of Lexington Partners in a $1.75 billion cash deal. The acquisition completed in April 2022.

In January 2022, Franklin Templeton acquired O'Shaughnessy Asset Management, an asset management firm founded by James O'Shaughnessy.

On May 31, 2022, it was announced that BNY Mellon Investment Management would sell Alcentra to Franklin Templeton. The transaction was completed on November 1, 2022.

On May 31, 2023, Great-West Lifeco announced that Franklin Templeton would acquire Putnam Investments for $925 million. Putnam Investments subsidiary, PanAgora Asset Management would not be included in the acquisition. The deal was completed in January 2024.

In August 2023, Bloomberg News reported that Franklin Templeton executives in China were mandated to attend courses on Xi Jinping Thought.

In October 2026 Franklin Templeton and Animoca Brands have entered into a strategic collaboration to explore and facilitate institutional adoption of tokenized real-world assets.

In November 2026, Franklin Templeton reported $1.795 trillion in assets under management, up 8% from the previous year, with $84.1 billion in long-term net inflows. Also in 2026, Franklin Templeton's alternative investments reached a record $304.6 billion, with $48.7 billion raised during the year.

== Mutual funds and ETFs ==
Franklin Templeton has 455 open-ended mutual funds and seven closed-end funds. Included in these are 27 state and federal tax-free income funds, an area of investment pioneered by Franklin.

Prominent funds include the Templeton Growth Fund, Inc. (opened 1954), the Mutual Shares fund (opened 1949), and the Mutual Discovery Fund (opened 1992) and the Templeton Growth (Euro) Fund.

The Franklin Income Fund (FKINX) is a mutual fund in Morningstar's "conservative allocation" category and "large/value" style box. The fund was created in 1948 and has paid uninterrupted dividends for 60 years. The Franklin Income Fund is constructed primarily of dividend-paying stocks and bonds (2%).

Franklin Templeton launched its first exchange-traded funds (ETFs) in 2013. By 2021, these included 55 active, smart beta/multifactor and passively managed ETFs in the U.S., with US$9.7 billion in assets under management.

In 2021, Franklin Templeton launched the first "tokenised" US mutual fund as a pilot – it uses a blockchain to process transactions and record share ownership. The technology is provided by the Stellar network and Blockchain Administrator, a Delaware company. The OnChain US Government Money Fund pilot started with $1.4M of seed money and investment from employees. The automated administration can trade around the clock and removes the need for brokerages, which should result in a "highly significant decrease in fees". However, the fund actually has a high level of costs because of its small size and the fact that, as a pilot, it is maintaining traditional records in parallel.

In February 2025, Franklin Templeton launched a spot crypto exchange-traded fund that holds a combination of roughly 80% bitcoin and 20% ether. That same month Franklin applied with the SEC for a spot Solana ETF.

Effective August 17, 2026, Franklin Resources, Inc. changed its corporate name to Franklin Templeton, Inc. to bring it into alignment with its Franklin Templeton brand.
