= Old Palm Golf Club =

Golf club in Palm Beach Gardens, Florida

Coordinates: 26.849°N 80.122°W

Old Palm Golf Club is a 650-acre (260 ha) private residential golf community with an equity club located in Palm Beach Gardens, Florida, United States. The community was founded in 2004 by WCI, but in September 2010 was purchased by real estate investment group Clarion Partners.

Old Palm Golf Club adheres to the vision of John D. MacArthur, whose original plan for Palm Beach Gardens was to create a "garden city", with streets lined with flowers and trees.

== Geographical area ==
The subdivision is bordered on the south by PGA Boulevard, on the east by Central Boulevard, and on the west by Florida's Turnpike.

== Golf course ==
The 7,401-yard (6,767 m) golf course at Old Palm Golf Club was originally designed by Raymond Floyd. The course is composed of an 18-hole par-72 golf course, a 19th "bye" hole and three full-length practice holes.

In 2007, Old Palm Golf Club was awarded the "Gold Signature Sanctuary" certification by the Audubon International Society. Close to 98% of irrigation water at Old Palm is reclaimed.

== Golf ==
It is home to the 33-acre (13 ha) Old Palm Golf Studio under the Director of Golf, Bud Taylor. In 1995, Taylor was elected to the PGA of America and is a PGA Certified Master Professional. In 2001 he was the recipient of Golfweek magazine's "Top 40 under 40" award.

Mark Hackett who serves as the Director of Instruction at Old Palm was honored by Golf Magazine as one of the Top 100 golf teachers in the country.

== Notable residents ==
- Raymond Floyd – The four-time major golf champion calls Old Palm Golf Club home.
- Louis Oosthuizen – The South African golfer and 2010 Open Championship winner, has a home at Old Palm overlooking the third hole.
- Charl Schwartzel – The South African golfer and winner of the 2011 Masters, owns a home in Old Palm overlooking the 14th fairway.
- Lee Westwood – The English golfer who has won 39 tournaments around the world and posted five top-three finishes in majors, bought property on the par-four 14th hole.

== Country club ==
Raymond Floyd's late wife, Maria Floyd, worked closely with interior designers Scott Snyder and Anthony Minichetti to create a distinct sense of place, with décor inspired by early-1900s architect Addison Mizner, the designer of Boca Raton and Palm Beach's Worth Avenue. The clubhouse is elegant yet comfortable and is built with organic construction materials, adorned with cypress ceilings and limestone flooring.

== Average home prices ==
Home prices vary, but range from $3.2 million to over $25 million.
