= Burlington Center =

Defunct mall in South Jersey, United States

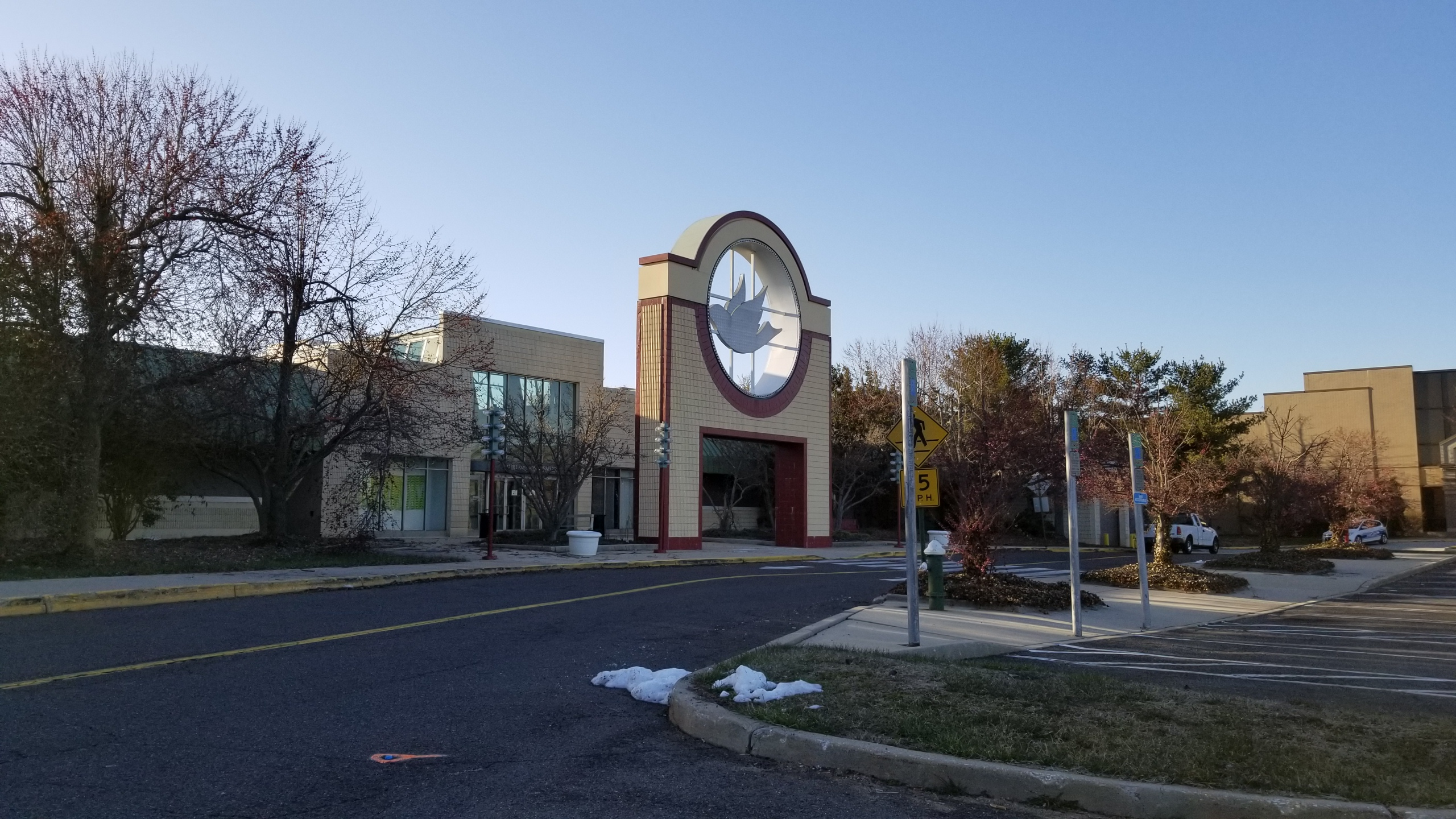
- Abandoned main entrance two months after permanent closure
- Location: Burlington Township, New Jersey, U.S.
- Coordinates: 40.041°N 74.825°W
- Address: 2501 Mt Holly Road, 08016
- Opened: August 5, 1982; 44 years ago
- Closed: January 8, 2018; 8 years ago
- Demolished: March 2021 – 2022
- Developer: The Rouse Company
- Owner: Clarion Partners
- Architect: RTKL Associates (mall); Charles J. Collins Jr. Architects (storefronts)
- Num. of stores: 125 (at peak)
- Num. of anchor tenants: 3 (at peak; 4th one at 2497 Mt Holly Rd)
- Floor area: 800,000 sq ft (74,000 m^{2})
- Floors: 2
- Parking: Parking lot
- Website: shopatburlington.com (2011 archive)

Burlington Center was a shopping mall located in Burlington Township, New Jersey, developed by the Rouse Company of Columbia, Maryland. Its anchors were Macy's, JCPenney, and Sears.

The mall closed on January 8, 2018, with only Sears remaining open until its closure on September 2, 2018. Demolition of the mall began in early 2021 and continued through 2022.

== History ==
=== Late 1970s–1982: Development and opening ===
The development of Burlington Center began in the late 1970s, initiated by James W. Rouse of The Rouse Company, a Columbia-based real-estate developer known for creating retail centers and planned communities that integrated retail with community-oriented design. The project centered on acquiring a site spanning more than 270 acres in the rural expanse of Burlington Township, New Jersey, along Route 541 (Mount Holly Road), to develop a regional mall accessible to the Philadelphia metropolitan area and nearby communities in South Jersey. The purpose of the development was to revitalize the area from growing suburban population, which in turn led to shifting consumer preferences toward convenient, all-weather shopping centers.

RTKL Associates was selected as the architect for the mall, along with Charles J. Collins Jr. Architects for the mall's storefronts. Construction initiated through the early 1980s. RTKL announced that the mall would feature a spacious central atrium illuminated by large skylights, allowing for an open-air feel while also providing protection from the elements, and was targeted to suburban retail demands with a focus on family-oriented amenities and easy navigation. An ample parking lot would surround the facility, helping Burlington Center with high traffic from nearby highways like I-295 and the New Jersey Turnpike.

Burlington Center had its grand opening on August 5, 1982, housing around 125 stores and restaurants, along with a diverse mix of national chains and local vendors that catered to everyday shopping needs. The mall's success erected significant economic growth in Burlington Township, increasing local tax revenues and inspiring similar development such as nearby housing and services.

=== After opening ===
JCPenney opened a 103,000 sq ft (9,600 m^{2}) store in August 1996 as an addition to the existing Strawbridge's and Sears stores. The Rouse Co. sold the mall to Jager Management in November 1999 for $10.5 million. Chuck E. Cheese, a family entertainment center, opened nearby Burlington Center at 2497 Mt Holly Rd on January 31, 2002. Strawbridge's was converted to a Macy's store in September 2006, along with the rest of Strawbridge's remaining locations following its acquisition by Federated Department Stores. At this period, the mall had three anchor stores and 100 smaller stores and restaurants.

=== Mid-2000s–2018: Decline and redevelopment ===
Starting in the mid-2000s, Burlington Center's success was turning around, following the rise of e-commerce, and competition from modern shopping centers and recently expanded ones, such as Quaker Bridge Mall. The 2010s saw an increase in the vacancy rate with few national chains remaining in the mall. In January 2010, Macy's announced that its Burlington Center location would close by March 2010. In June 2012, the mall was sold at auction to Moonbeam Equities for $4.4 million. In January 2014, JCPenney left the mall as part of the chain's round of closures affecting 33 locations nationwide, leaving Sears as the only anchor store at the mall.

In February 2014, Moonbeam Capital Investments announced plans for redevelopment that would demolish the former Macy's and JCPenney and replace it with an outdoor shopping area. Construction was expected to begin by the summer of 2016, but work was delayed as a result of lease renegotiations with Sears, a primary property holder.

Chuck E. Cheese closed its doors on October 2, 2016, exacerbating Burlington Center's low traffic by removing a popular, family-friendly entertainment center. Throughout 2017, the mall continued to decline. By summer 2017, only a few stores were left at the mall, including a food pantry, arcade, Bath & Body Works, and Foot Locker. The food court was completely vacant and portions of the parking lot were overgrown with weeds. In the 2017 Christmas season, two non-profits–the Burlington Township Food Pantry and Burlington Center Mission–were evicted, being requested to leave the mall by December 22.

Burlington Center Mall was at its peak as a "dead mall" in late 2017. The mall's plants were removed, and it voluntarily closed on January 8, 2018 due to extensive damage from the mall's fire sprinkler system, after originally planning to close in March 2018. The Sears store located on the property, which was under separate ownership than the rest of the mall, remained open.

On May 31, 2018, it was announced that Sears would be closing in September 2018 as part of a plan to close 72 stores nationwide, leaving the mall entirely without tenants.

In January 2019, Clarion Partners, LLC was moving ahead with plans to acquire the former mall from Moonbeam Capital Investments, LLC and demolish it for an industrial development. OClario Partners purchased the mall for $22 million. On February 1, 2019, a large bronze elephant named Petal that had been in the mall since 1982 was moved out of the closed mall and was relocated to the Burlington Riverwalk.

In November 2019, a new proposal, known as The Crossings, was introduced for the redevelopment of the mall, including retail, restaurants, 400 to 500 housing units and several large warehouses. Following the demolition of the mall in 2021, construction on a warehouse on the former site of the mall began in 2022.

== Controversy ==
The mall was closed early on January 13, 2007, due to gang-related violence that may have involved 20 individuals connected with the Bloods and the Next Level Gang (considered a stepping stone to the Crips).

== 2018 fire sprinkler problem ==
In early January 2018, the fire sprinkler system in Burlington Center Mall was extensively damaged due to record-breaking cold, causing multiple water pipes to burst. The resulting flooding caused significant damage to the mall's interior, particularly in the common areas and other remaining storefronts.

On January 8, 2018, Burlington Township Fire Marshal permanently shut down the mall's interior from public access because after the incident, the fire sprinkler system was confirmed to be non-functional, and the cost for repairing the infrastructure was deemed prohibitive by Moonbeam Capital Investments. Additionally, the freezing not only damaged the sprinkler system but also damaged HVAC systems and electrical systems. Only Sears remained open, but the tenant could only be accessed from its exterior entrance. It closed in September 2018.

== Location ==
The mall was located on Mount Holly Road (County Route 541), between Interstate 295 (exits 47A/B) and the New Jersey Turnpike (exit 5).
