= Jordan Peccia =

American Engineering Professor and Head of College, Yale University

- Occupations: Professor, Head of College

Academic background
- Education: Montana State University, University of Colorado Boulder

Academic work
- Discipline: environmental engineering, environmental microbiology, indoor air quality, wastewater-based epidemiology
- Institutions: Yale University

Jordan L. Peccia is an American engineer and Professor of Environmental Engineering at Yale University. He was born in Cut Bank, MT. Since 2005, Peccia has been a member of the Chemical and Environmental Engineering faculty at Yale University, where he holds the Thomas E. Golden endowed professorship., and served as the department's Chair from 2022 to 2025. He is an elected member of the Connecticut Academy of Science and Engineering. In 2023, Peccia was named Head of Yale’s Benjamin Franklin College.

== Academic career ==
Peccia’s academic work integrates the problem-solving aspects of environmental engineering with microbial genetics and public health. Contributions include determining the infectious risks associated with the land application of sewage sludge, advancing exposure science on the beneficial health impacts of the indoor microbiome, and inventing DNA sequence-based tools for classifying the mold status of a building. Early in the COVID-19 pandemic, Peccia’s lab at Yale demonstrated how SARS-CoV-2 RNA concentrations in domestic wastewater could be a leading indicator (over clinical case monitoring) of COVID-19 outbreaks. Peccia is a member of a group of international scientists that advocated for recognizing the airborne route of transmission during the COVID-19 pandemic. He is the founding chair of the Gordon Research Conference of the Microbiology of the Built Environment

== Family ==
His brother is James D. Peccia III, Major General (retired), United States Air Force.
