= Alan B. Miller Hall =

College building in Virginia, US

Coordinates: 37.26624°N 76.71805°W

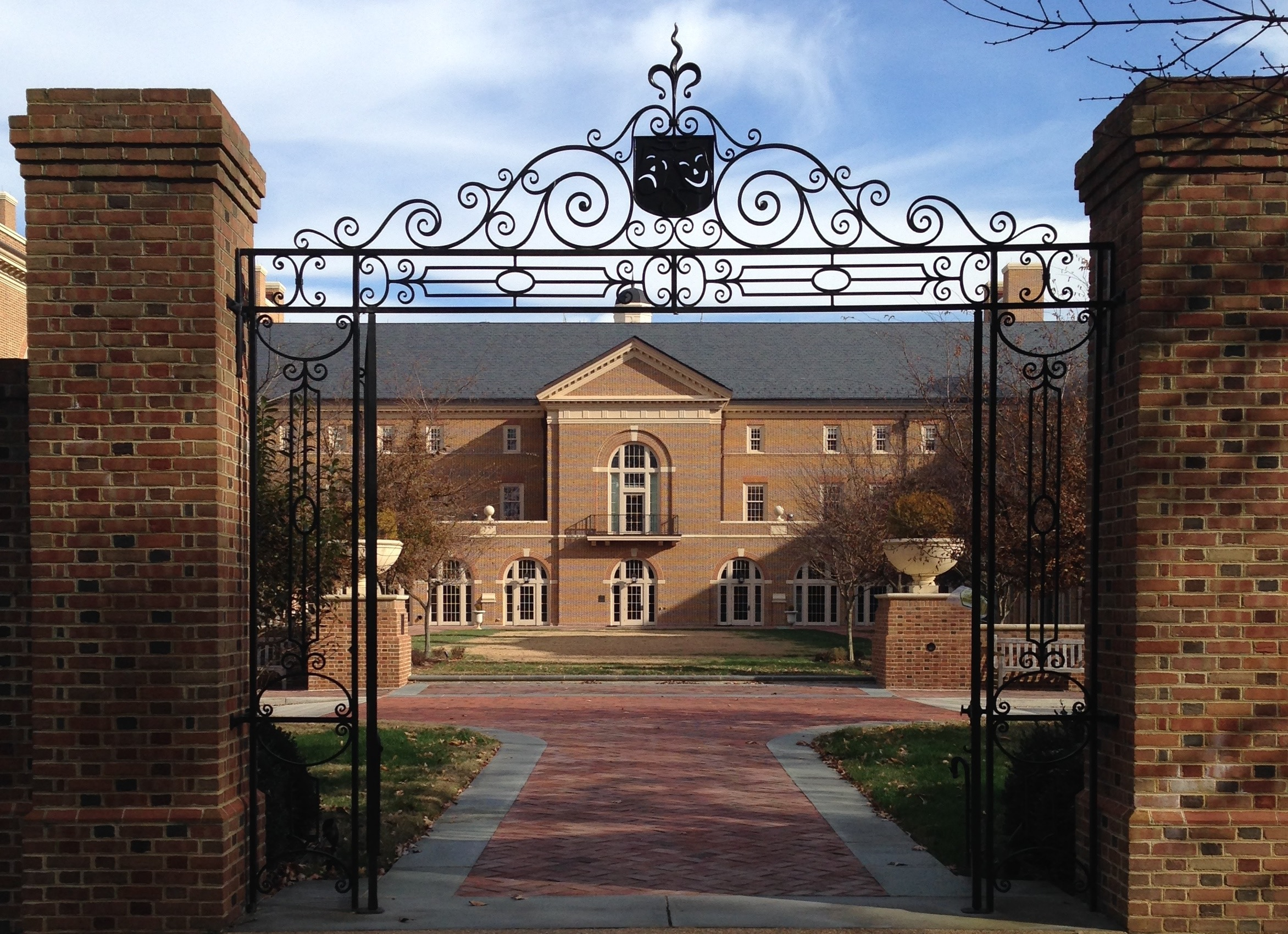
- Mason School of Business’s Alan B. Miller Hall

General information
- Type: Academic
- Architectural style: Georgian
- Location: Williamsburg, Virginia, 101 Ukrop Way
- Current tenants: Mason School of Business
- Construction started: 30 March 2007
- Completed: 1 June 2009
- Inaugurated: 2 October 2009
- Cost: US$52.1 million (bricks and mortar) $75.0 million (total cost)
- Owner: The College of William & Mary

Dimensions
- Other dimensions: 2,465,870 ft^{3}

Technical details
- Floor area: 166,000 ft.^{2}

Design and construction
- Architect: Robert A.M. Stern Architects
- Architecture firm: Moseley Architects
- Structural engineer: Rex Holmlin

The Alan B. Miller Hall became the home of the Mason School of Business at the College of William & Mary in Williamsburg, Virginia, United States in 2009. The building was designed by prominent firm Robert A.M. Stern Architects. The building has been awarded LEED Gold Certification after adhering to sustainability standards. It also houses the Mason School of Business Library.

Constructed in a little over two years at a project cost of $75 million, Alan B. Miller Hall is named after alumnus Alan B. Miller '58, a healthcare management entrepreneur who founded Fortune 500 company Universal Health Services.
