= Heather Miller (businesswoman) =

American businesswoman (born 1966)

- Born: Heather Hay; May 30, 1966 (age 60); Baltimore, Maryland, U.S.
- Education: Johns Hopkins University
- Occupation: Businesswoman
- Spouse(s): James Murren (m. 1990; div. 2021) Bill Miller (m. 2022)
- Children: 2 (with Murren)

Heather Miller (formerly Murren, born May 30, 1966) is an American businesswoman. She is a private investor, former Wall Street securities analyst. She was a Congressional appointed commissioner on the Financial Crisis Inquiry Commission in 2009 and the President's Commission on Enhancing National Cybersecurity in 2016.

== Career ==
Miller began her career on Wall Street at Salomon Brothers in 1988 as a securities analyst and ultimately retired in 2002 as a managing director, Global Securities Research and Economics of Merrill Lynch.

Miller was chosen six consecutive years as a member of Institutional Investor's All-American Research Team. Her multi-year inclusion in the Greenwich survey and repeated designations by The Wall Street Journal as an all-star analyst underscore her other notable achievements in the economic and financial services community. She was profiled in FORTUNE magazine as one of Wall Street's all-star analysts while at Merrill Lynch.

== Post-Career ==
After retiring from Wall Street, in 2002 and seeing the extreme need for quality medical care in the State of Nevada, she and her then husband co-founded the first non-profit cancer research and treatment center in Las Vegas, the Nevada Cancer Institute (NVCI) where she was chairman and CEO until 2009. The 140,000 square foot flagship facility was constructed between 2002 and 2005 when it opened to patients and researchers with fully integrated wet and dry laboratories, imaging, radiation and clinical oncology practices and patient support services. The NVCI carried out the first-ever first-in-man clinical trials in the state of Nevada as well as seminal clinical trials making previously unavailable early-stage clinical trial therapies available to over 15,000 patients. The research center-clinic flagship facility was acquired by the University of California San Diego Health Systems in January 2012 and subsequently the NVCI Foundation was then merged into Roseman University in December 2013 after reorganization. Through a partnership with the Cure4TheKids Foundation, nearly 100 pediatric cancer patients are seen daily, and cumulatively, over 50,000 patients have been treated regardless of their ability to pay. Cure4TheKids Foundation also conducts interventional and observational research in genetics, neuron psychology, and oncology.

Miller was appointed in 2009 by Congress to the Financial Crisis Inquiry Commission (FCIC), a 10-member Federal commission established to examine the domestic and global cause of the financial crisis. The commission, to which subpoena powers were granted, examined and held hearings on more than 20 specific areas of inquiry, including the role of fraud and abuse in the financial sector; state and federal regulatory enforcement; tax treatment of financial products; lending practices and securitization; and corporate governance and executive compensation. The commission reported its finding in January 2011. The published book "The Financial Crisis Inquiry Report" was listed on The New York Times bestseller list and was critically acclaimed.

On April 13, 2016, President Barack Obama announced Miller's appointment to the President's Commission on Enhancing National Cybersecurity.

On May 3, 2017, Fidelity National Financial, Inc. announced that its board of directors adopted a resolution increasing the size of the company's board of directors to thirteen and elected Murren to its board of directors.

On May 11, 2017, Miller along with her former husband James Murren were presented with the Distinguished Woodrow Wilson Award For Corporate Citizenship. The award is given to those who, by their example and business practices, have demonstrated a profound concern for the common good beyond the bottom line, acting as a force for positive change.

She is a member of the board of trustees of the Johns Hopkins University (JHU), Johns Hopkins Medicine (JHM) and the chair of the Board of Managers of the Johns Hopkins Applied Physics Laboratory. The Applied Physics Laboratory is a not-for-profit university-affiliated research center providing research and development in the areas of cybersecurity, undersea and air defense, space, national security analysis, special operations and strategic defense to our nation. She was appointed co-chair of the "Rising To The Challenge" Capital Campaign, where she was instrumental in the campaign exceeding its four billion-dollar goal, by over 2 billion dollars. This raised a total of $6.015 Billion for JHU and Johns Hopkins Medical. She has previously held a gubernatorial appointment to the Nevada Academy of Health and the Board of Economic Development for the state of Nevada.

Miller is a graduate of Johns Hopkins University and a Chartered Financial Analyst. Fluent in Spanish and French, she has been a translator and medical assistant for Volunteers in Medicine of Southern Nevada, a nonprofit organization that provides healthcare to the community regardless of the patient's ability to pay.

Miller and the Murren Family Foundation gave the founding $1 million gift to launch the Center for Women, Gender and Global Leadership at Howard University.

In June 2022, Miller married fellow JHU Trustee and investor Bill Miller.
