= Raymond A. Mason =

American financier (1936–2025)

Raymond Adams "Chip" Mason (September 28, 1936 – August 22, 2025) was an American financier who was the founder of Baltimore-based investment firm Legg Mason and its president, chairman and CEO until 2007. He founded his first brokerage company at age 25, merged it with another, and took Legg Mason public in 1974.

== Early life and education ==
Mason was born in Lynchburg, Virginia, on September 28, 1936, and spent much of his childhood in Bethlehem, Pennsylvania. He graduated with a bachelor's degree in economics from the College of William & Mary in 1959.

== Career ==
Mason founded Mason & Company, a small stock brokerage in Newport News, Virginia, in 1962 at age 25. In 1970 his firm merged with Legg and Company, which brought Mason to Baltimore. He retired in 2007 after 46 years as chairman, president, and CEO of Legg Mason.

Mason chaired the Securities Industry Association, the board of governors of the National Association of Securities Dealers, the United Way of Central Maryland Campaign, the Maryland Business Roundtable for Education and the Greater Baltimore Committee. He was also a board member of the Baltimore Museum of Art, and the National Aquarium.

== Death ==
Mason died on August 22, 2025, in Naples, Florida, at the age of 88.

== Honors ==
In 2005 the Raymond A. Mason School of Business at the College of William & Mary in Virginia was named after Mason, who was an alumnus of the college and was instrumental in establishing its business school. In 2008 he received an honorary degree from the Johns Hopkins University. In 2016 Mason was an honoree in the Baltimore Sun’s inaugural Business and Civic Hall of Fame for his role as a business leader in Baltimore and champion of social issues in the city.
