= Benjamin Franklin College =

Residential college at Yale University

- Residential college at Yale University
- Yale University
- Location: 90 Prospect Street, New Haven, CT 06511
- Coordinates: 41.314423°N 72.925297°W
- Established: 2017
- Named for: Benjamin Franklin
- Colors: Blue, Red
- Sister college: Selwyn College, Cambridge; Keble College, Oxford
- Head: Jordan Peccia
- Dean: Mica Rencher
- Undergraduates: 452
- Website: benjaminfranklin.yalecollege.yale.edu

Benjamin Franklin College is one of fourteen residential colleges at Yale University in New Haven, Connecticut. Named after Benjamin Franklin, who received an honorary degree from Yale in 1753, the college opened to students in August 2017 along with its twin, Pauli Murray College. The two colleges were the first residential colleges built at Yale since Morse and Ezra Stiles colleges opened in 1962, increasing undergraduate enrollment by approximately 15 percent.

Designed by Robert A.M. Stern Architects in the Collegiate Gothic style, the college houses 452 students and shares a 6.2-acre (2.5 ha) site with Pauli Murray College along Prospect Street. The project, funded entirely by private donations including a $250 million gift from Charles B. Johnson (Yale Class of 1954), received LEED Gold certification and has won multiple architectural awards.

== History ==
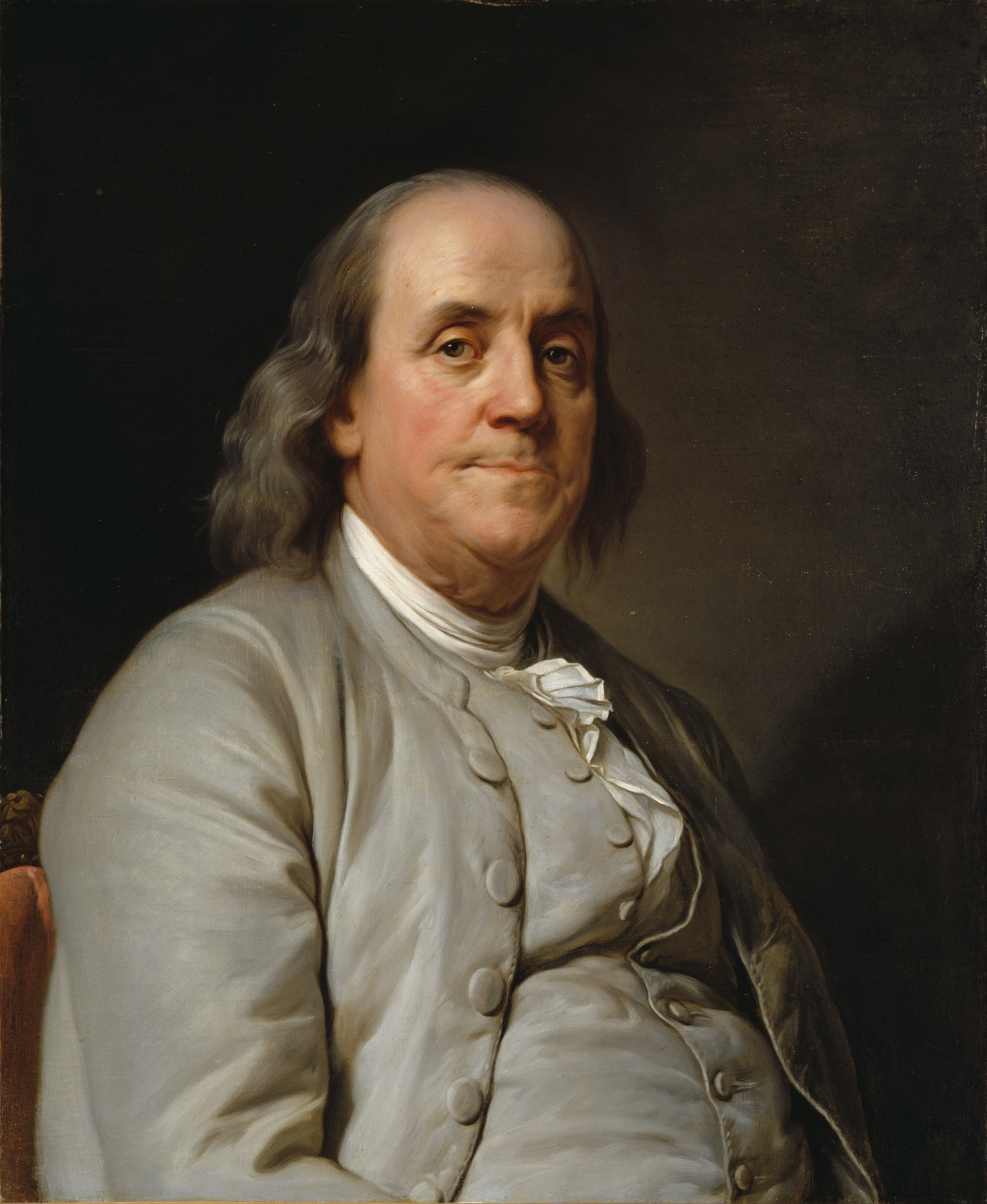
Benjamin Franklin, namesake of the college

In 2008, Yale University President Rick Levin announced that the university would expand its enrollment by opening two new residential colleges for a total of fourteen. Architectural models were unveiled by Robert A.M. Stern Architects in May 2009. Construction began in fall 2014, with an official groundbreaking in April 2015. The first students moved in on August 25, 2017, and a formal dedication ceremony was held on October 6, 2017.

=== Naming ===
In April 2016, the university announced that the colleges would be named after Pauli Murray and Benjamin Franklin. Franklin was chosen at the request of Charles B. Johnson, who had made the single largest gift in Yale's history of $250 million to support construction of the new colleges. Yale President Peter Salovey cited Franklin's 1753 honorary degree from Yale and the university's role as repository of the most extensive collection of Franklin Papers in existence.

The naming decision was controversial. During the years of planning, the Yale administration had stated that the naming was "not for sale" and that neither college would be named for living donors. The Yale Daily News subsequently reported that the Yale Corporation had agreed to the Franklin name shortly after Johnson's 2013 donation, despite having solicited public input on naming via forums, debates, and surveys over several years. Some students and faculty objected to honoring a historical figure who was a slaveholder for much of his life, though Franklin became an abolitionist late in life, served as president of the Pennsylvania Abolition Society, and petitioned the U.S. Congress to end the slave trade.

== Architecture and design ==
Benjamin Franklin College was designed by Robert A.M. Stern, then dean of the Yale School of Architecture, along with Graham S. Wyatt, Melissa DelVecchio, and Jennifer L. Stone of Robert A.M. Stern Architects. The college was built by Dimeo Construction Company.

The design is in the Collegiate Gothic style, continuing the tradition established by architect James Gamble Rogers, who designed eight of Yale's original ten residential colleges in the 1930s. The total construction cost for both colleges was approximately $500 million, one of the most expensive capital projects on any single site in Connecticut, funded entirely by private donations.

The college encompasses approximately 200,000 square feet (19,000 m^{2}) and features seven courtyards linked by sixteen unique stone-and-brick-lined arched passageways. The facades are clad in hand-set brick in a tricolor blend, accented by buff Indiana limestone and Weymouth granite. Building heights rise from north to south to allow maximum sunlight in the courtyards.

Facilities include a 300-seat dining hall with a stone hearth pizza oven, a library, the Millstone Common Room, a student buttery (cafe), a bike shop, and a student kitchen. A shared lower level between the two colleges contains a basketball court, dance theater, fitness center, movie theater, and art studio.

=== Edward P. Bass Tower ===
The Edward P. Bass Tower rises 192 feet (59 m) between the two colleges, visually connecting Yale's Central Campus with Science Hill to the north. The upper portions of the tower were prefabricated off-site.

=== Stone carvings and ironwork ===
More than 400 pieces of hand-carved stone ornament are distributed between the two colleges, designed by former Yale faculty member Patrick Pinnell and executed by Traditional Cut Stone.

The entryway gates of Benjamin Franklin College were hand-forged by three Hungarian blacksmiths \u2014 Gabor Szombathy, Szabolcs Nemeth, and Zoltan Kovacs \u2014 over fourteen months of design and fabrication. Drawing inspiration from Samuel Yellin's historic Yale residential college gates, each main Franklin gate leaf weighs approximately 1,600 pounds (730 kg) and incorporates elm leaves, white oak leaves, and mountain laurel. The gates won the 2017 Stanford White Award in Craftsmanship and Artisanship from the Institute of Classical Architecture and Art.

=== Sustainability ===
Benjamin Franklin and Pauli Murray colleges achieved LEED Gold certification in October 2020. Forty-eight underground closed-loop ground-source heat pumps offset approximately 50 percent of cooling needs and 30 percent of heating needs, and the colleges use 35 percent less energy on average than Yale's other residential colleges. Wood flooring in the dining rooms, libraries, and common rooms was sourced from Yale Forests, and 94 percent of construction debris was recycled.

== Awards ==
- 2017 Stanford White Award, Institute of Classical Architecture and Art
- 2018 Palladio Award, Traditional Building
- 2018 AIA Housing Award, American Institute of Architects
- SCUP Honor Award for Excellence in Architecture, Society for College and University Planning

== Heraldry ==
The college crest features bends rompu (heraldic shapes resembling lightning bolts), representing Franklin's scientific exploration of electricity, and fleurs-de-lys (French lilies), recalling his diplomatic service in France during the American Revolution.

== Student life ==
Benjamin Franklin College houses approximately 452 students. The Benjamin Franklin College Council (BFCC) is an elected student governing body that organizes events and represents the college community. College traditions include the Founders Ball, Doggapalooza, and an annual Lord of the Rings marathon held in the Head of College House.

Students participate in intramural sports as part of the annual Tyng Cup competition, which has been awarded since 1933.

In 2018, students began painting murals in the college's lower level, including a portrait of Rosalind Franklin framed with DNA strands and a quotation from Benjamin Franklin above a sleeping bulldog.

== Leadership ==
Heads of college
#	Name	Term
1	Charles Bailyn, A. Bartlett Giamatti Professor of Astronomy and Physics	2016-2023
2	Jordan Peccia, Thomas E. Golden Jr. Professor of Environmental Engineering	2023-present

Charles Bailyn was appointed as the inaugural head of college in July 2016 and served until the end of the 2022-2023 academic year. Jordan Peccia, an expert on human exposure to airborne and waterborne viruses, began a five-year term on July 1, 2023.

Jessie Royce Hill, the former dean of Silliman College, served as the college's first dean from 2016. Mica Rencher serves as the current dean.

== See also ==
- Pauli Murray College
- Residential colleges of Yale University
- Benjamin Franklin
