= John Pletcher =

U.S. Air Force general

John M. Pletcher
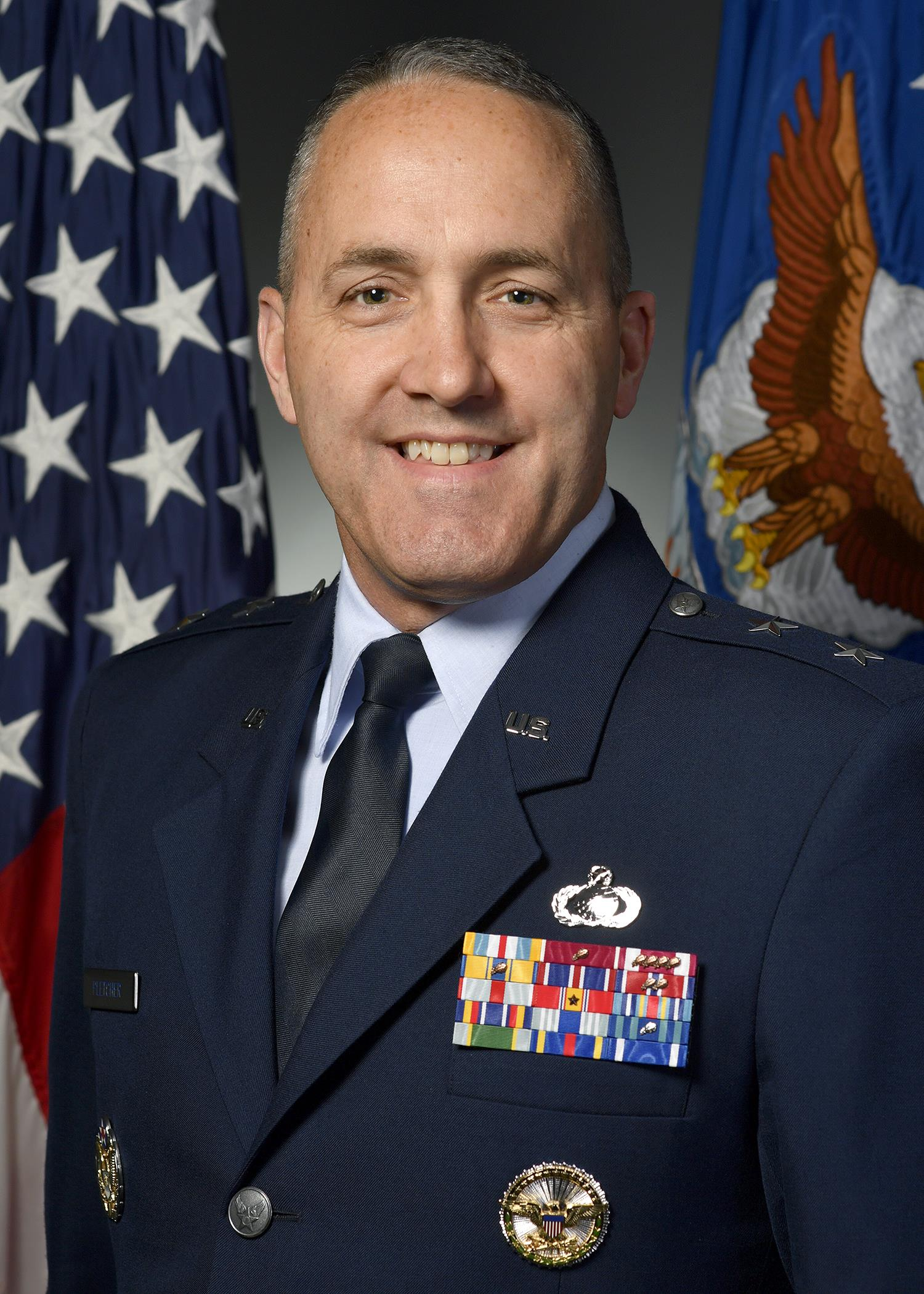
- Military career
- Allegiance: United States
- Branch: United States Air Force
- Service years: 1988-present (37 years)
- Rank: Major General
- Commands: 11th Mission Support Group; 31st Comptroller Squadron
- Awards: Defense Superior Service Medal (2); Legion of Merit (2)

John M. Pletcher is a retired United States Air Force major general who served as the deputy assistant secretary, for budget of the Office of the Assistant Secretary of the Air Force for Financial Management and Comptroller. Previously, he was the director of financial management of the Air Force Materiel Command.

Military offices
Preceded by ???	Director of Financial Management of the Air Force Materiel Command; 2014–2017	Succeeded by James Peccia
Preceded by ???	Deputy Assistant Secretary for Budget of the Office of the Assistant Secretary of the Air Force for Financial Management and Comptroller; 2017–2020	Succeeded by James Peccia
