= Bill Miller (investor) =

American Investor (born 1950)

- Born: 1950 (age 75–76); Laurinburg, North Carolina, U.S.
- Education: Washington and Lee University (BA); Johns Hopkins University (PhD)
- Known for: His management of a portfolio that beat the S&P 500 Index from 1991 to 2005, consecutively.
- Spouse: Heather Miller (m. 2022)

William H. Miller III (born 1950) is an American investor, fund manager, and philanthropist. He served as the chairman and chief investment officer of Legg Mason Capital Management as well as the principal portfolio manager of the Legg Mason Capital Management Value Trust. He was the portfolio manager of the former Legg Mason Opportunity Trust mutual funds, now housed at the firms Patient Capital Partners and Miller Value Partners since 2023.

== Early life ==
Bill Miller was born in 1950 in Laurinburg, North Carolina. His father worked as a terminal manager for a trucking company.

Miller attended Miami Palmetto Senior High School, graduating in 1968. He then graduated with honors from Washington and Lee University in 1972 with a degree in economics. He served in the U.S. Army from 1972 to 1975. While serving in the military as a First Lieutenant, Miller received the Army Commendation Medal for meritorious service while assigned to the 502d U.S. Army Security Agency Company. His rank upon leaving the U.S. Army was Captain. Miller then pursued graduate studies in philosophy in the Ph.D. program at Johns Hopkins University while working part-time in accounting.

== Career ==
=== J.E. Baker Company ===
Prior to joining Legg Mason in 1981, he served as treasurer of the J.E. Baker Company, a major manufacturer of products for the steel and cement industries.

=== Legg Mason ===
He joined Legg Mason Capital Management in 1981 as a security analyst. Miller received his CFA designation in 1986. In 2007, he was elected the chairman of the firm as well as its chief investment officer, running the Legg Mason Value Trust mutual fund. He turned over the Value Trust to Sam Peters in 2012, ending his relationship with Legg in 2016.

Miller lost more than $100 million due to large investments in Bear Stearns during the 2008 financial crisis. He was depicted in The Big Short debating with Steve Eisman as his investments lost value.

=== Miller Value Partners ===
After leaving Legg Mason, Miller started a smaller investment firm called Miller Value Partners.

=== Other ===
Miller was an early investor in Amazon and invested heavily when most analysts were skeptical. He also invested heavily in Bitcoin and Valeant Pharmaceuticals.

== Investment philosophy ==
Miller is considered a value investor who believes that "any stock can be a value stock if it trades at a discount to its intrinsic value". Miller has reiterated his investment philosophy multiple times in letters to shareholders, writing this in his 2006 letter:

Value investing means really asking what are the best values, and not assuming that because something looks expensive that it is, or assuming that because a stock is down in price and trades at low multiples that it is a bargain ... Sometimes growth is cheap and value expensive. . . . The question is not growth or value, but where is the best value ... We construct portfolios by using 'factor diversification.' . . . We own a mix of companies whose fundamental valuation factors differ. We have high P/E and low P/E, high price-to-book and low-price-to-book. Most investors tend to be relatively undiversified with respect to these valuation factors, with traditional value investors clustered in low valuations, and growth investors in high valuations ... It was in the mid-1990s that we began to create portfolios that had greater factor diversification, which became our strength ...We own low PE and we own high PE, but we own them for the same reason: we think they are mispriced. We differ from many value investors in being willing to analyze stocks that look expensive to see if they really are. Most, in fact, are, but some are not. To the extent we get that right, we will benefit shareholders and clients.

=== Efficient market hypothesis ===
The Legg Mason Capital Management Value Trust's after-fee return beat the S&P 500 index for 15 consecutive years from 1991 through 2005. Consistently producing market-beating returns is considered to be unlikely according to the efficient market hypothesis.

Miller once said, "As for the so-called streak, that's an accident of the calendar. If the year ended on different months it wouldn't be there and at some point the mathematics will hit us. We've been lucky. Well, maybe it's not 100% luck—maybe 95% luck." Michael Mauboussin, former chief investment strategist at Legg Mason Capital Management, looked at the historical data on the percent of equity mutual funds that beat the market during Value Trust's 15-year streak. Because the number of equity mutual funds beating the market fell as low as 8% in one year and 13% in another, he estimated the probability of beating the market in the 15 years ending 2005 was 1 in 2.3 million.

However, Leonard Mlodinow, in The Drunkard's Walk, notes that Mauboussin's analysis misframes the question and, when framed properly, the probability of occurrence of such a streak is much higher, around 3%. Additionally, Mauboussin's analysis also doesn't consider other possible 15-year windows where similar streaks could have occurred, but did not. When these periods are also included in the analysis, the odds of someone beating the market 15 years in a row at some point in the United States is around 75%—in other words, it would have been unlikely if there hadn't been such an occurrence.

== Personal life ==
Miller lives in Florida. In 2018, Miller made a large donation to the philosophy department of Johns Hopkins University, to which he was given entry as a PhD candidate and which he left for a CFA before completion. It was the largest-ever gift to a philosophy department. He stated that philosophy "ha[d] made a huge difference both to my life outside business...and to the actual decisions I've made in investing". In 2021, he made a large donation to support Johns Hopkins's physics and astronomy department as well as one to the Santa Fe Institute to advance the science of complex systems.

In June 2022, Miller married fellow JHU Trustee Heather Miller.

In October 2024, Miller made a large donation to his alma mater, Washington and Lee University, making it the 10th need-blind university in the United States.
