= Dolphin Scholarship Foundation =

- Abbreviation: DSF
- Formation: 1960
- Headquarters: Virginia Beach, VA, United States
- President: Steven W. Maas
- Revenue: $552,371 (2015)
- Expenses: $590,703 (2015)
- Website: www.dolphinscholarship.org

Dolphin Scholarship Foundation (DSF) was established in 1960 to assist children of the U.S. Submarine Force with college scholarships through private fundraising and donations, as well as any dividends from its trust fund.

The first scholarship of $350 was awarded to John L. Haines, Jr. in June 1961. Funds were raised primarily through the tireless efforts of submarine officers' wives' organizations throughout the United States. As the cost of college education continued to skyrocket, so did the need for the Foundation to assist children of Submariners. Today DSF receives individual, corporate, and memorial donations, as well as continued strong support from the submarine community and spouse organizations. Donations go directly to support scholarships; income from DSF investments supplement these contributions for scholarships and operating expenses. Dolphin Scholarship Foundation also conducts fundraisers such as the Annual Cartoon Calendar (since 1963), Annual Golf Tournaments in Hampton Roads, Virginia and Groton, Connecticut, along with annual, major, and planned giving campaigns.

Dolphin Scholarship Foundation currently awards 114 annual scholarships ranging from $2,600 to $4,000 to each Dolphin Scholar. Each recipient may potentially receive a total of $16,000 for undergraduate study or trade certification. The number of new awards granted each year is determined by graduation and attrition of current Dolphin Scholars. Dolphin Scholarship Foundation is proud to have awarded over $14,000,000 million dollars to over 1500 students attending universities and colleges throughout the United States and overseas.

DSF also proudly administers over 10 scholarships to support undergraduate and trade/vocational certification for Sailors assigned to specific submarines and their dependents.
