= Royce Investment Partners =

Small-cap mutual investment company

Royce Investment Partners is a family of mutual funds that focuses primarily on small-cap investing, and has been considered one of the industry's most experienced smaller-company stock pickers. Royce & Associates, LLC serves as investment adviser to all Royce portfolios, including open-end mutual funds and closed-end funds.

Royce uses a bottom-up approach to invest in small-cap and micro-cap stocks.

== History ==
Charles M. Royce assumed investment management of Pennsylvania Mutual Fund when he purchased Quest Advisory Corp. in 1972. (The firm's name was changed to Royce & Associates in 1997.) Royce, who has been described as a "small-company stock pioneer" by American business journalist Consuelo Mack, enjoys one of the longest tenures of any active mutual fund manager.

After assuming management of Pennsylvania Mutual Fund, Royce began to shift his focus toward small-cap stocks that he believed were able to generate free cash flow and better survive down-market periods. This emphasis on downside protection would become one of the hallmarks of the firm's investment approach.

During the 1990s, Royce broadened its portfolio line-up and expanded its investment staff. On October 1, 2001, Royce became a wholly owned, independent subsidiary of Legg Mason, Inc. In the 2000s, the company began to introduce global and international small-cap mutual fund portfolios.

Effective July 1, 2014, Co-Chief Investment Officer Christopher D. Clark assumed the role of President of Royce, a position held by Royce since he purchased the firm in 1972.

== Investment approach ==
Royce Investment Partners invest in primarily micro-cap and small-cap companies using disciplined, value-oriented approaches. Royce portfolio managers look primarily at balance sheet strength, cash flow characteristics, and returns on invested capital when choosing stocks for the funds they manage. Royce emphasizes long-term, absolute (as opposed to relative) performance.

== See also ==
- Active management
- Value Investing
