= Greg Johnson (businessman) =

American business executive

- Born: Gregory Eugene Johnson; 1961 or 1962 (age 64–65)
- Education: Washington and Lee University
- Occupation: Businessman
- Title: Chairman, San Francisco Giants; Executive chairman, Franklin Templeton Investments
- Term: 2014-
- Predecessor: Charles B. Johnson
- Spouse: Married
- Children: 2
- Parent(s): Charles B. Johnson; Ann Demarest Lutes

Gregory Eugene Johnson (born 1961/1962) is an American businessman, and the executive chairman of Franklin Templeton Investments, a company founded in 1947 by his grandfather, Rupert H. Johnson Sr.

== Early life ==
Johnson earned a bachelor's degree in accounting and business administration from Washington and Lee University.

== Career ==
Johnson was CEO of Franklin from January 2004 to 2021. In 2011, he earned US$6.61 million, and $49.93 million over the past five years.

In June 2013, Johnson succeeded his father, Charles B. Johnson, as chairman of Franklin Templeton Investments.

== Personal life ==
Johnson has a son and a daughter.
