= Nevada Cancer Institute =

Medical research institute in Nevada

Nevada Cancer Institute (NVCI), founded in 2002, was the official cancer institute for the state of Nevada from 2003 to 2013, located in Summerlin, Nevada. The Institute became part of UC San Diego Health in February, 2012.

A non-profit organization, NVCI served patients throughout the greater Las Vegas area, offering full-service clinics in Summerlin, Nevada, and at University Medical Center, in the downtown medical district. The Institute provided inpatient treatment services such as chemotherapy, radiation and diagnostic imaging services, as well as an array of clinical trials. The Institute’s mobile screening unit, the Hope Coach, has provided mammography services throughout the state.

NVCI has served more than 17,000 patients since opening in 2005. The Institute was dedicated to providing innovative and collaborative cancer care, clinical trials and community education.

The Institute became part of UC San Diego Health in February, 2012. In November 2013, Roseman University completed a merger with the former Nevada Cancer Institute Foundation that expedited Roseman's planning for a premier community-based medical school, the first allopathic medical school in Nevada. NVCI’s Ralph and Betty Engelstad Research Building provided the home for Roseman’s College of Medicine in Summerlin, which then continued to house NVCI researchers.

== Background ==
As part of UC San Diego Health, Nevada Cancer Institute offered current and advanced cancer treatment options, with patient and family support services, to residents of Nevada. The Institute provided inpatient treatment services such as chemotherapy, radiation and diagnostic imaging services, as well as an array of clinical trials, many of which would not otherwise have been available in the state of Nevada. The Institute also provided assistance to help patients find the information and non-medical resources they needed to support themselves during treatment - including support groups, an on-site meditation room, yoga and other activities.

== Facilities ==
The Institute’s four-story treatment facility occupied 142000 sqft. The lobby had a blown-glass chandelier designed by Dale Chihuly.

== History ==
- In 2002 The Howard Hughes Corporation donated 6 acres (2.4 ha) of land for the Institute's first building. The land was part of a 61-acre (25 ha) site in the Summerlin area of Las Vegas.
- In 2003, ground was broken for NVCI's first 142,000-square-foot (13,200 m^{2}) state-of-the art treatment center. The building was designed by Marnell Corrao Associates who are best known for designing many of the megaresorts on the Las Vegas Strip. Construction cost was $53 million.
- The facility opened in August 2005. The grand opening was on September 23, 2005.
- In October 2005, the Institute acquired an additional site of 10 acres (4.0 ha) adjacent to its current site for future expansion.
- In January 2006, the city of Las Vegas announced plans to work with the Institute, the Bureau of Land Management and other entities to acquire about 20 acres (8.1 ha) of land in the city for future use.
- Clinical research was initiated in 2005 with the opening of Phase I and Phase II clinical trials, including 4 first in human Phase I of investigational drugs. Clinical research and Translational research conducted at NVCI produced a body of work that resulted in 100 publications from NVCI investigators in peer reviewed medical publications (1-100).
- House Resolution 234, a bill to expand the Institute, was sponsored by Shelley Berkley and co-sponsored by Nevada's two other congressional representatives. It was introduced to the House on January 7, 2009.
- On December 2, 2011, the institute announced that it entered into an agreement to sell the facility to the UC San Diego Health System as part of a prearranged Chapter 11 bankruptcy filing.
- On February 1, 2012, the UC San Diego Health System assumed operations of Nevada Cancer Institute's clinical practice.
- In November 2013, Roseman University completed a merger with the former Nevada Cancer Institute Foundation. UCSD closed its clinic, the UCSD NVCI clinic and flagship building that it had purchased approximately a year previous, and Roseman bought the building and is occupying it while continuing the original mission of NVCI.
