= Legg Mason =

Former American investment management company

Legg Mason, Inc.

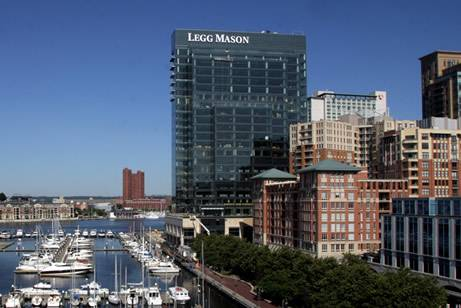
- Legg Mason Headquarters in Baltimore
- Industry: Investment management
- Founded: 1899; 127 years ago
- Defunct: July 31, 2020; 6 years ago (as an independent entity)
- Fate: Acquired by Franklin Templeton Investments
- Headquarters: Baltimore, Maryland, U.S.
- Key people: Joseph A. Sullivan (chairman, president & CEO)
- Services: Asset management
- Revenue: ▲$2.922 billion (2019)
- Operating income: 50,831,000 United States dollar (2015)
- Net income: ▲$304 million (2019)
- AUM: ▼$730.8 billion (2019)
- Total assets: ▲$8.006 billion (2019)
- Total equity: ▲$3.792 billion (2019)
- Number of employees: 3,059 (2020)

Legg Mason, Inc. was an American investment management and asset management firm headquartered in Baltimore, founded in 1899 and acquired by Franklin Templeton Investments as of July 2020. As of December 31, 2019, the company had $730.8 billion in assets under management, including $161.2 billion in equity assets, $420.2 billion in fixed income assets, $74.3 billion in alternative assets, and $75.1 billion in liquidity assets.

== History ==
In 1899, George Mackubin & Co., predecessor to Legg & Co., was founded in Baltimore, Maryland. It got its start selling stocks out of a back office in the Baltimore Stock Exchange in 1899. In 1970, it had offices in San Francisco, New York, as well as several in Maryland, with over 400 employees. It was best known for its expertise in the life and casualty insurance industry.

In 1949, after the departure of Mackubin, John C. Legg Jr. named the company after himself.

In 1962, Mason & Co., a stock brokerage, was founded by Raymond A. "Chip" Mason in Newport News, Virginia.

In 1967, Mason & Co., with over 80 employees in 4 offices, became one of the largest Virginia-based stock brokerages.

In 1970, Mason & Co. was acquired by Legg & Co., forming Legg Mason & Co., Inc., with headquarters in Baltimore, Maryland.

In 1973 Legg Mason & Co. merged with New York securities broker Wood Walker. Wood Walker had been founded in 1869.

In 1975, Raymond A. Mason became chairman and CEO, adding to his existing role as president.

In 1982, Legg Mason Fund Adviser, Inc. was established to manage the company's flagship fund, Legg Mason Value Trust.

In 1983, the company became a public company via an initial public offering on the New York Stock Exchange, raising $14 million.

In 1985 the company acquired the Pennsylvanian A.E. Masten & Co. Inc. and Howard Weil Financial Corp of Louisiana.

In 1986 the company acquired brokerage house Warren York Inc. of Pennsylvania.

In 1997, the company moved its headquarters to 100 Light Street in Baltimore.

In July 2002, the company sold its stock brokerage subsidiary to Raymond James Financial.

In 2005, the company transferred its Private Client and Capital Markets business to Citigroup in exchange for Citigroup's asset management business in a $3.7 billion transaction, turning Legg Mason into the 5th largest money management firm in the U.S.

In 2006, fund manager Bill Miller's streak of beating the S&P 500 15 years in a row ended.

In January 2008, Mark R. Fetting became CEO of the company, succeeding Raymond A. "Chip" Mason.

In May 2008, during the Great Recession, the company reported its first quarterly loss as a public company.

In July 2009, the company moved its headquarters to Inner Harbor East, Baltimore.

In October 2009, Nelson Peltz joined the board of directors of the company after acquiring a stake.

In May 2010, the company announced layoffs of as many as 350 people.

In February 2013, Joseph A. Sullivan became CEO of the company.

In 2016, the company acquired real estate investment firm Clarion Partners, combined its hedge fund platform Permal with New York independent hedge fund investor EnTrust and purchased a minority stake in New Jersey–based Precidian Investments to boost its exchange traded funds.

In April 2019, the company ended all sports sponsorships to cut costs.

In July 2020, Franklin Templeton Investments acquired Legg Mason for $4.5 billion.

== Investment affiliates ==
=== Brandywine Global ===
- Year Founded: 1986
- Year Acquired: 1997
- Location: Headquartered in Philadelphia; offices in Chicago, San Francisco, Singapore, and London

=== Clarion Partners ===
- Year Founded: 1982
- Year Acquired: 2016
- Location: Headquartered in New York City; offices in Baltimore, Atlanta, Boston, Dallas, London, Los Angeles, São Paulo, Seattle, and Washington, D.C.

=== ClearBridge Investments ===
- Year Founded: 2005 (predecessor firms date to 1962)
- Year Acquired: 2005 (as Citigroup's asset management business)
- Location: Headquartered in New York City; offices in Baltimore, San Francisco, and Wilmington

=== EnTrust Global ===
- Year Founded: 2016 (predecessor firms date back to 1997 and 1973)
- Year Acquired: 2005 (as The Permal Group)
- Location: Headquartered in New York; offices in Beijing, Boston, Chicago, Hong Kong, London, Paris, Singapore, and Washington, D.C.

=== Martin Currie ===
- Year Founded: 1881
- Year Acquired: 2014
- Location: Edinburgh, Scotland

=== QS Investors ===
- Year Founded: 1999
- Year Acquired: 2014
- Location: New York City

=== RARE Infrastructure ===
- Year Founded: 2006
- Year Acquired: 2015
- Location: Sydney, Australia; office in Stamford, Connecticut

=== Royce Investment Partners ===
- Year Founded: 1972
- Year Acquired: 2001
- Location: New York

=== Western Asset Management Company ===
- Year Founded: 1971
- Year Acquired: 1986
- Location: Headquartered in Pasadena, California; offices in New York City, London, Hong Kong, Melbourne, São Paulo, Singapore, Dubai, and Tokyo

== Former offices ==
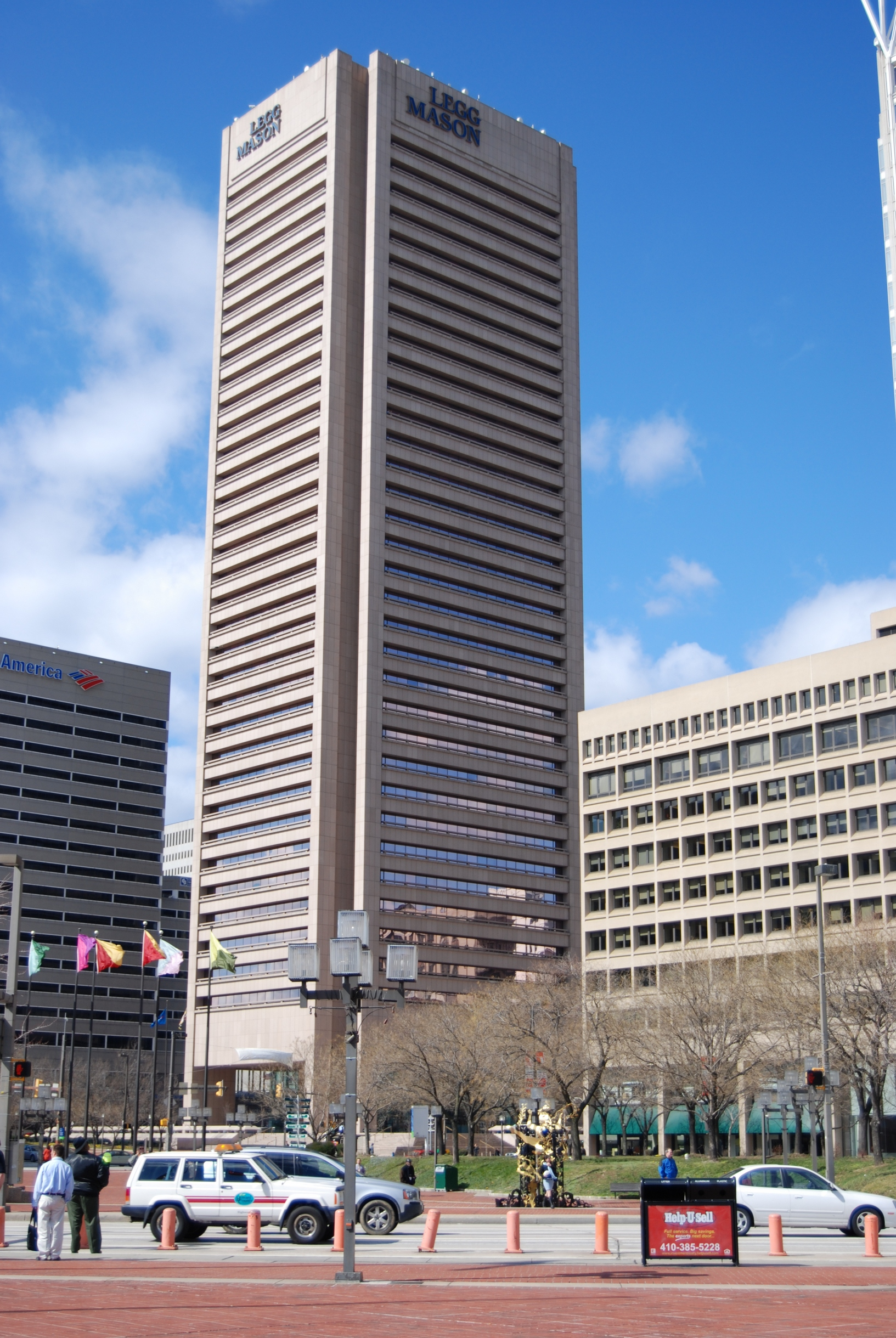
100 Light Street

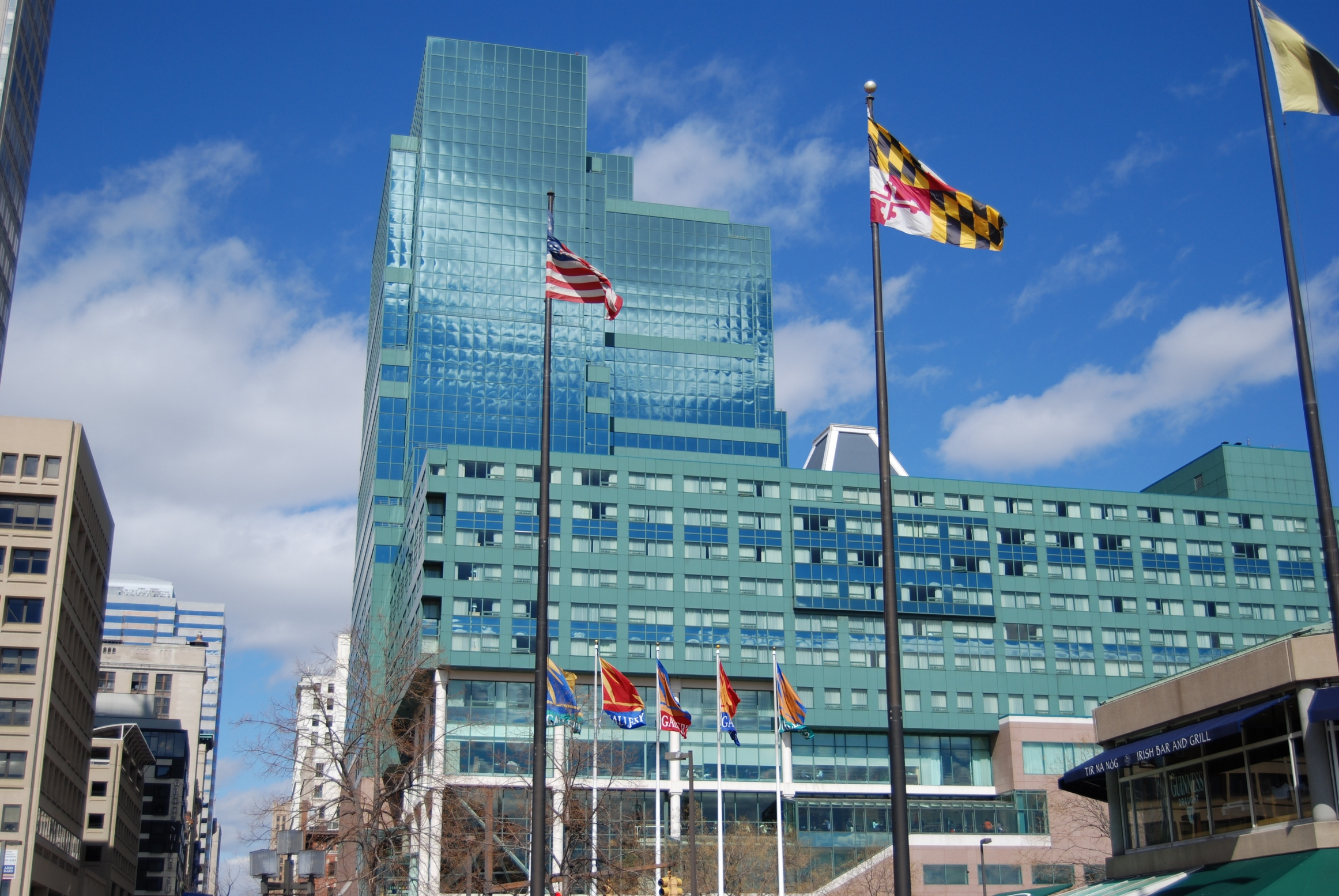
111 S. Calvert Street - Harborplace Tower

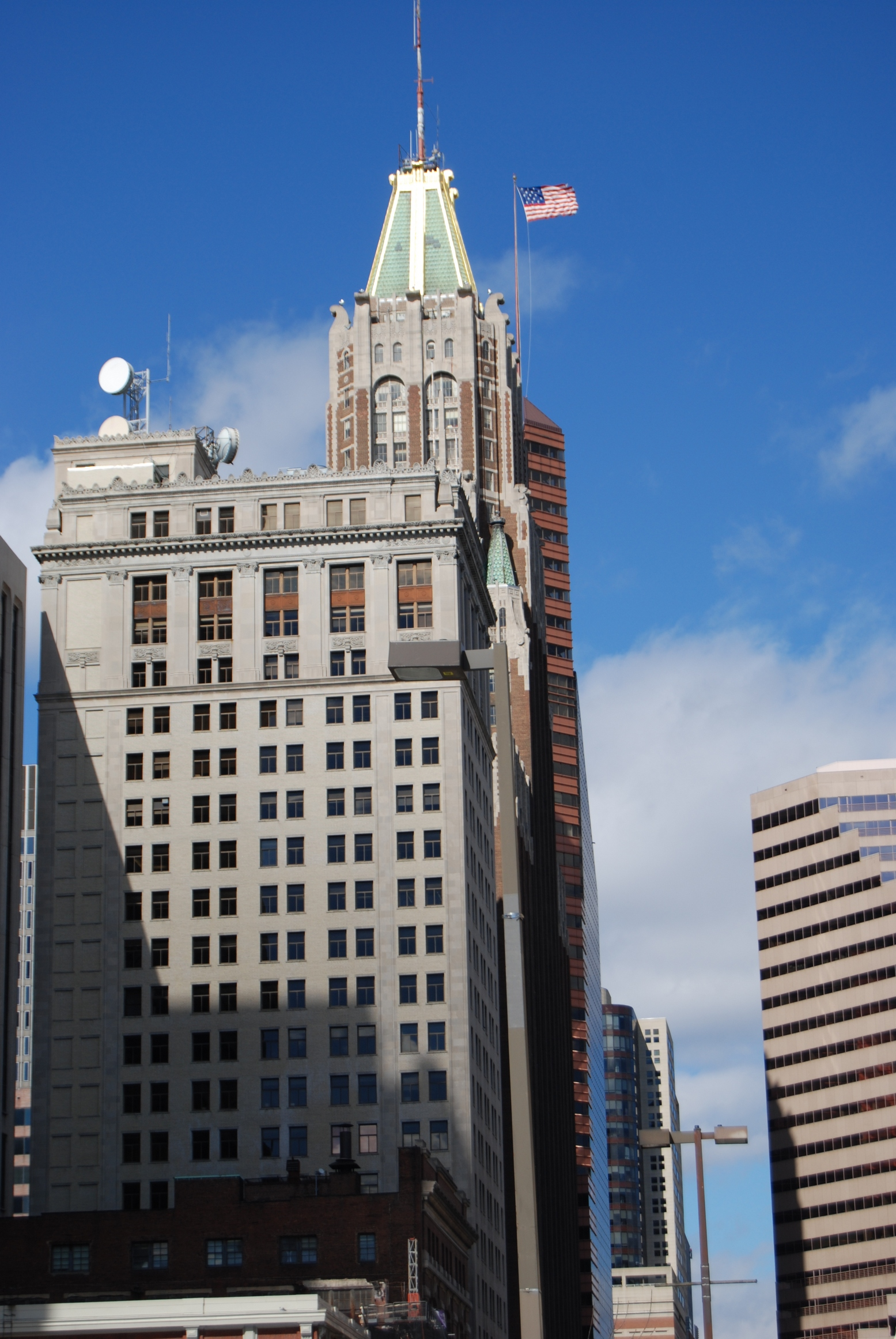
Redwood Street

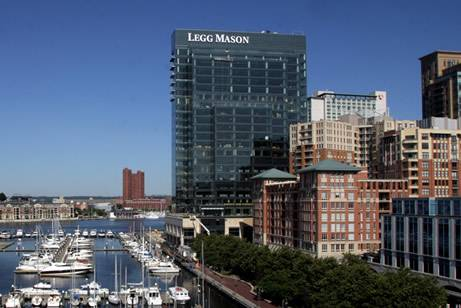
100 International Drive - Legg Mason Tower
