= List of Lambda Chi Alpha members =

The list of Lambda Chi Alpha members includes notable initiated and honorary members of Lambda Chi Alpha fraternity.

Founded at Boston University in Boston in 1909, Lambda Chi Alpha is one of the largest social fraternities in North America with over 300,000 lifetime members and active chapters and colonies at 195 universities in the United States, Canada, and Australia.

== Academics ==
Name	Original chapter	Notability	Ref.
James W. Abbott	University of South Dakota	President of University of South Dakota	
John D. Baldeschwieler	Cornell University	Chemist and Caltech professor	
Samuel King Allison	University of Chicago	Physicist who worked on Manhattan Project	
Samuel Beatty	University of Toronto	Mathematician, chancellor of University of Toronto, and first Canadian Mathematical Society president	
J. Michael Bishop	Gettysburg College	Immunologist, chancellor and professor at University of California, San Francisco, and Nobel Prize in Physiology or Medicine recipient	
David L. Chicoine	South Dakota State University	President of South Dakota State University	
Lambuth McGeehee Clarke	Randolph–Macon College	President of Virginia Wesleyan University	
Donald J. Cram	Rollins College	Chemist, professor at University of California, Los Angeles, and Nobel Prize in Chemistry winner	
Edward T. Foote II	Yale University	President of University of Miami	
William C. Friday	North Carolina State University	University of North Carolina administrator	
Homer Hitt	Louisiana State University	Founding chancellor of University of New Orleans	
Charles Glen King	Washington State University	Nutritionist and University of Pittsburgh professor	
William Manchester	University of Massachusetts Amherst	Historian and non-fiction author of American Caesar: Douglas MacArthur 1880–1964,The Death of a President, The Last Lion: Winston Spencer Churchill	
A. Frank Martin	Oklahoma State University–Stillwater	One of ten founding members of Kappa Kappa Psi fraternity	
David S. Mason	Cornell University	Author and professor emeritus at Butler University	
John McCardell Jr.	Washington and Lee University	President of Middlebury College	
Abe Mickal	Louisiana State University	Obstetrics and gynecology chairman at Louisiana State University School of Medicine	
Perry Miller	University of Chicago	Harvard University professor and historian	
Donald Othmer	Honorary member	Inventor and philanthropist	
Todd Parnell	Drury University	President of Drury University	
George Preti	Polytechnic Institute of Brooklyn	Organic chemist and University of Pennsylvania Medical School professor	
Ricardo Romo	University of Texas at Austin	President of University of Texas at San Antonio	
B. F. Skinner	Hamilton College	Harvard University psychology professor who developed psychological behavior analysis	
Oliver R. Smoot	Massachusetts Institute of Technology	Engineer and president of International Organization for Standardization	
Willis M. Tate	Southern Methodist University	President of Southern Methodist University	
Paul Trible	Hampden–Sydney College	President of Christopher Newport University and U.S. Senator from Virginia	
William E. Troutt	Union University	President of Rhodes College	
Hermann Viets	New York University Tandon School of Engineering	President of Milwaukee School of Engineering	
W. Roger Webb	Oklahoma State University	President of University of Central Oklahoma	
Donald W. Zacharias	Georgetown College	President of Mississippi State University and Western Kentucky University	

== Artists and writers ==
Name	Original chapter	Notability	Ref.
Robert Ahrens	Cornell University	Producer of the Broadway musical Xanadu and others	
Xavier Cortada	University of Miami	Artist	
Chester Gould	Northwestern University	Creator of Dick Tracy	
Edward D. Kuekes	Baldwin Wallace University	Editorial Cartoonist, Pulitzer Prize Winner	
Edwin Markham	Honorary member	Poet and author of "The Man with the Hoe"	
Robert B. Parker	Colby College	Creator of Spenser and writer	
Chuck Pfarrer	California State University, Northridge	Screenwriter, novelist, and author	

== Astronauts ==
Name	Original chapter	Notability	Ref.
Thomas Akers	Missouri University of Science and Technology	Mission specialist on STS-41, STS-49, STS-61, and STS-79	
Richard N. Richards	University of Missouri	Pilot on STS-28 and commander of STS-41, STS-50, and STS-64	
Terrence W. Wilcutt	Western Kentucky University	Pilot of STS-68 and STS-79 and commander of STS-89 and STS-106	

== Business ==
Name	Original chapter	Notability	Ref.
F. Duane Ackerman	Rollins College	CEO of BellSouth	
John D. Arnold	Vanderbilt University	Natural gas industry executive	
James Beckett	Southern Methodist University	Founder of Beckett Publications	
Fred J. Borch	Case Western Reserve University	Chairman and CEO of General Electric	
Jack O. Bovender, Jr.	Duke University	CEO of HCA Healthcare	
Dale Carlsen	Sacramento State University	Owner and founder of Mattress Firm	
Nicholas Chabraja	Northwestern University	CEO of General Dynamics	
Richard Clark	Washington & Jefferson College	CEO of Merck & Co.	
William T. Dillard	University of Arkansas	Founder of Dillard's	
John V. Faraci	Denison University	CEO of International Paper	
Robert B. Goergen	University of Rochester	CEO of Blyth, Inc.	
Todd Graves	University of Georgia	Co-founder and CEO of Raising Cane's Chicken Fingers	
Scott Herren	Georgia Tech	Managing director and vice president at Citrix Systems	
Michael Johns	University of Miami	Health care executive and White House presidential speechwriter	
C. Robert Kidder	University of Michigan	Chairman of Chrysler	
William McCormick	Boston University	Founder and chairman emeritus of McCormick & Schmick's	
William W. McGuire	University of Texas at Austin	CEO of UnitedHealth Group	
James W. Owens	North Carolina State University	CEO of Caterpillar Inc.	
John S. Reed	Washington and Jefferson College	CEO of Citigroup	
Matthew K. Rose	University of Missouri	CEO of Burlington Northern Santa Fe, LLC	
Richard Santulli	Polytechnic University (New York)	CEO of NetJets	
Paul C. Saville	College of William & Mary	CEO of NVR, Inc.	
Charles M. Stotz	Cornell University	Architect and historic preservation movement leader	
Mark B. Templeton	North Carolina State University	CEO of Citrix Systems	
Timothy Tucker	Union University	President of American Pharmacists Association	
Jim Walton	University of Arkansas	CEO of Arvest Bank	
S. Robson Walton	University of Arkansas	Chairman of Walmart	
Russ Weiner	San Diego State	Founder and CEO of Rockstar	

== Comedians ==
Name / Original chapter / Notability / Ref.; Sugar Sammy / Honorary member / Comedian and writer

== Film and television ==
Name	Original chapter	Notability	Ref.
Claude Akins	Northwestern University	Television actor, B. J. and the Bear	
Charles Gary Allison	University of Southern California	Screenwriter and film producer and co-founder of Sundance Film Festival	
Walt Becker	University of Southern California	Film director, Van Wilder, Wild Hogs, and Old Dogs, and novelist	
Powers Boothe	Texas State University	Film and television actor, Deadwood, 24, and Nashville	
Benjamin Bratt	University of California, Santa Barbara	Film and television producer and actor	
Ryan Brown	University of Oklahoma	Television actor, The Guiding Light and The Young and the Restless	
Gene Callahan	Louisiana State University	Film and television production designer and two-time Academy Award winner	
Duane Clark	University of California, Los Angeles	Television director, producer, and writer and son of Dick Clark	
Will Forte	University of California, Los Angeles	Television and film actor, Saturday Night Live	
Will Geer	University of Chicago	Actor, The Waltons	
Dabbs Greer	Drury University	Film and television actor, Gunsmoke, Hank, and Little House on the Prairie	
Bill Hayes	DePauw University	Television actor	
John Michael Hayes	University of Massachusetts Amherst	Academy Award-winning screenwriter for Alfred Hitchcock	
Jean Hersholt	Honorary member	Actor	
Dean Jagger	Wabash College	Film, television, and stage actor and Academy Award winner, Twelve O'Clock High	
Chris Klein	Texas Christian University	Film actor, American Pie	
Lance Krall	Georgia State University	Actor	
Anson Mount	Sewanee: The University of the South	Film and television actor	
Joel Murray	Northern Illinois University	Film and television actor	
Michael O'Neil	Auburn University	Film and television actor, J. Edgar and Dallas Buyers Club	
James Rebhorn	Wittenberg University	Film and television actor, White Collar and Homeland	
Jonathan Sadowski	University of Illinois Urbana-Champaign	Film and television actor, Live Free or Die Hard, Friday the 13th, and The Goods: Live Hard, Sell Hard	
Johnathon Schaech	University of Maryland, Baltimore County	Film and television actor	
Robert Urich	Florida State University	Film, television, and screen actor, Vegas	
Ralph Waite	Bucknell University	Television actor, The Waltons	
Randall Wallace	Duke University	Film screenwriter, producer, and director, The Man in the Iron Mask, We Were Soldiers, Secretariat, and Heaven Is for Real	
Matt Walsh	Northern Illinois University	Film and television actor	
Michael Westmore	University of California, Santa Barbara	Television makeup artist on Star Trek and Academy Award and Emmy Award winner	

== Government and politics ==
Name	Original chapter	Notability	Ref.
Thomas Abernethy	University of Mississippi	U.S. member of Congress from Mississippi	
James Burr V Allred	Cumberland University	Governor of Texas	
Lincoln Almond	University of Rhode Island	Governor of Rhode Island	
Sigurd Anderson	South Dakota State University	Governor of South Dakota	
Rick Baker	Florida State University	Mayor of St. Petersburg, Florida	
Willard L. Beaulac	Brown University	U.S. ambassador to Argentina, Chile, Colombia, Cuba, and Paraguay	
Ellis Yarnal Berry	University of South Dakota	U.S. Member of Congress from South Dakota	
Alan Bible	University of Nevada, Reno	U.S. Senator from Nevada	
Joseph H. Bottum	University of South Dakota	U.S. Senator from South Dakota	
Kevin Brady	University of South Dakota	U.S. member of Congress from Texas	
John Breaux	University of Louisiana at Lafayette	U.S. Senator from Louisiana	
Bob Brown	Montana State University	Montana Secretary of State	
Charles Harrison Brown	Drury University	U.S. member of Congress from Missouri	
Omar Burleson	Abilene Christian University	U.S. member of Congress from Texas	
DeWayne Burns	Tarleton State University	Member of Texas House of Representatives	
Maurice G. Burnside	The Citadel	U.S. member of Congress from West Virginia	
Donald Carcieri	Brown University	Governor of Rhode Island	
David Carlucci	Cornell University	New York State Senator	
Max Cleland	Stetson University	U.S. Senator from Georgia	
Ron Coleman	University of Texas at El Paso	U.S. member of Congress from Texas	
John Cooksey	Louisiana State University	U.S. member of Congress from Louisiana	
Nathaniel Craley	Gettysburg College	U.S. member of Congress from Pennsylvania	
John Danforth	Honorary member	U.S. Senator from Missouri	
William E. Dannemeyer	Honorary member	U.S. member of Congress from California	
Dennis Daugaard	University of South Dakota	Governor of South Dakota	
Lloyd Doggett	University of Texas at Austin	U.S. member of Congress from Texas	
James W. Dunn	Michigan State University	U.S. member of Congress from Michigan	
Marc S. Ellenbogen	Syracuse University	U.S. diplomat, philanthropist, and presidential advisor	
Houston I. Flournoy	Cornell University	California State Controller and Republican gubernatorial nominee	
Craig Ford	Auburn University	Alabama State House minority leader	
Wendell Ford	University of Kentucky	U.S. Senator from Kentucky	
Alan Frumin	Colgate University	Parliamentarian of United States Senate	
Pat Garofalo	Minnesota State University, Mankato	Minnesota State Representative	
Virgil Goode	University of Richmond	U.S. member of Congress from Virginia	
Bill Grant	Florida State University	U.S. member of Congress from Florida	
Durward Gorham Hall	Drury University	U.S. member of Congress from Missouri	
Richard T. Hanna	University of California, Los Angeles	U.S. member of Congress from California	
Joe Frank Harris	University of Georgia	Governor of Georgia	
Vance Hartke	University of Evansville	U.S. Senator from Indiana	
Howell Heflin	Birmingham–Southern College	U.S. Senator from Alabama	
Robert King High	University of Tennessee at Chattanooga	Mayor of Miami	
Michael Johns	University of Miami	White House presidential speechwriter and public policy expert	
Harold T. Johnson	University of Nevada, Reno	U.S. member of Congress from California	
James R. Jones	University of Oklahoma	U.S. member of Congress from Oklahoma and U.S. ambassador to Mexico	
Sam H. Jones	Louisiana State University	Governor of Louisiana	
Jack Kingston	University of Georgia	U.S. member of Congress from Georgia	
Robert W. Levering	Denison University	U.S. member of Congress from Ohio	
James Tilghman Lloyd	Culver–Stockton College	U.S. member of Congress from Missouri	
Harold Lovre	University of South Dakota	U.S. Senator from South Dakota	
José Manuel Lozano	University of Texas at Austin	Member of Texas House of Representatives	
Theron Lynd	Mississippi State University	A circuit clerk and voter registrar in Forrest County, Mississippi; who was part of six year of litigation for discrimination and denying African American voter registration in the 1960s and 1970s.	
William C. Marland	University of Alabama	Governor of West Virginia	
Ray Marshall	Millsaps College	U.S. Secretary of Labor	
William McCormick	Boston University	U.S. ambassador to New Zealand and Samoa	
John A. McGuire	Dartmouth College	U.S. member of Congress from Connecticut	
George T. Mickelson	University of South Dakota	Governor of South Dakota	
Allen I. Olson	University of North Dakota	Governor of North Dakota	
Joe Dan Osceola	Georgetown College	Chief and tribal ambassador of Seminole tribe	
John Oxendine	Mercer University	Georgia insurance and safety fire commissioner and former gubernatorial candidate	
Ron Paul	Gettysburg College	U.S. member of Congress from Texas and 2012 presidential candidate	
John Howard Pyle	Honorary member	Governor of Arizona	
Carl West Rich	University of Cincinnati	Mayor of Cincinnati and U.S. member of Congress from Ohio	
Tom Rooney	Syracuse University	U.S. member of Congress from Florida	
Charles H. Russell	University of Nevada, Reno	Governor of Nevada	
Alfred Taylor	Honorary member	Governor of Tennessee	
Paul Trible	Hampden–Sydney College	U.S. Senator from Virginia and president of Christopher Newport University	
Harry S. Truman	Honorary member	33rd President of the United States	
Harold H. Velde	Northwestern University	U.S. member of Congress from Illinois	
Curt Weldon	West Chester University	U.S. member of Congress from Pennsylvania	
Means Wilkinson	University of Arkansas	Speaker of the Arkansas House of Representatives	
Kevin Yoder	University of Kansas	U.S. member of Congress from Kansas	
Clarence Clifton Young	University of Nevada, Reno	U.S. member of Congress and Nevada Supreme Court justice	

== Law ==
Name	Original chapter	Notability	Ref.
Mack E. Barham	University of Colorado Boulder	Louisiana Supreme Court justice	
Harry Blackmun	Harvard University	U.S. Supreme Court associate justice	
Cleon H. Foust	Wabash College	32nd Indiana Attorney General	
James D. Johnson	Cumberland University	Arkansas Supreme Court justice	
I. Beverly Lake Jr.	Wake Forest University	North Carolina Supreme Court chief justice	
Joseph Lambert	Georgetown College	Kentucky Supreme Court chief justice	
Barron Patterson McCune	Washington & Jefferson College	U.S. District Court for the Western District of Pennsylvania federal judge	
Alfred P. Murrah	University of Oklahoma	U.S. Court of Appeals for the Tenth Circuit federal judge	
Clifford Taylor	University of Michigan	Michigan Supreme Court chief justice	
Gerald W. VandeWalle	University of North Dakota	North Dakota Supreme Court chief justice	
Robert L. Wilkins	Rose–Hulman Institute of Technology	U.S. Court of Appeals for the District of Columbia federal judge	
Clarence Clifton Young	University of Nevada, Reno	Supreme Court of Nevada justice	

== Media ==
Name	Original chapter	Notability	Ref.
Dave Barnett	University of North Texas	Radio broadcaster for Fox Sports 1 and American Sports Network	
Paul Harvey	University of Tulsa	ABC News Radio broadcaster	
Scott Hastings	University of Arkansas	Altitude Sports and Entertainment color commentator for Denver Nuggets	
Ray Lane	Michigan State University	WKBD-TV sports director in Detroit	
Josh Lewin	Northwestern University	Play-by-play announcer for UCLA Bruins football and basketball	
Woody Paige	University of Tennessee	Sports commentator for ESPN's Around the Horn	
John Quiñones	St. Mary's University (Texas)	ABC News correspondent	
Bill Rasmussen	DePauw University	Co-founder and first president and CEO of ESPN	
Frank Reynolds	Wabash College	ABC World News Tonight anchor	
John Tesh	North Carolina State University	Entertainment Tonight co-host	

== Military ==
Name	Original chapter	Notability	Ref.
Pappy Boyington	University of Washington	U.S. Marine Corps World War II fighter ace	
Jimmy Doolittle	University of California, Berkeley	World War II general and Medal of Honor recipient	
Russell E. Dougherty	Western Kentucky University	Strategic Air Command commander	
Otto Glasser	Cornell University	U.S. Air Force lieutenant general who developed intercontinental ballistic missile technologies	
Montgomery Meigs	University of Wisconsin–Madison	Commanding general of U.S. Army Europe and Africa	
Chuck Pfarrer	California State University Northridge	SEAL Team Six member responsible for apprehending terrorist Abu Abbas	

== Musicians ==
Name	Original chapter	Notability	Ref.
Bobby Bare Jr.	University of Tennessee	Musician	
Zane Birdwell	Samford University	Grammy Award-winning recording engineer	
Jason Boland	Oklahoma State University	Lead vocalist and songwriter for Jason Boland & The Stragglers	
Neal E. Boyd	Southeast Missouri State University	Opera singer and America's Got Talent winner	
George Bruns	Oregon State University	Academy and Grammy Award-nominated film and television composer	
Jay Chattaway	West Virginia University	Emmy Award-winning film and television composer	
Kenny Chesney	East Tennessee State University	Country music singer, songwriter, and guitarist	
Brett Eldredge	Elmhurst University	Country music singer, songwriter, and producer	
Tony Fagenson	University of Southern California	Rock music guitarist and songwriter for Eve 6 and Dead Posey	
Charles Kelley	University of Georgia	Country music singer and guitarist for Lady A	
Frankie Laine	Honorary member	Traditional pop musician	
Jonathan Meiburg	Sewanee: The University of the South	Indie rock musician and lead singer and songwriter for Shearwater	
Mark Schultz	Kansas State University	Contemporary Christian musician	
John Tesh	North Carolina State University	Pop music musician	

== Sports ==
=== Baseball ===
Name	Original chapter	Notability	Ref.
Brian Bannister	University of Southern California	Professional baseball player, New York Mets and Kansas City Royals	
Larry Burchart	Oklahoma State University	Professional baseball player, Cleveland Indians	
Cliff Chambers	Washington State University	Professional baseball player, Chicago Cubs, Pittsburgh Pirates, and St. Louis Cardinals	
Mickey Cochrane	Boston University	Professional baseball player, Detroit Tigers and Philadelphia Athletics and Baseball Hall of Fame member	
Jim Cox	Indiana State University	Professional baseball player, Montreal Expos	
Emerson Dickman	Washington and Lee University	Professional baseball player, Boston Red Sox	
Larry Dierker	University of California, Santa Barbara	Professional baseball player, Houston Astros and St. Louis Cardinals	
Matt Dunbar	Florida State University	Professional baseball player, Florida Marlins	
Eddie Dunn	University of Miami	Head football and baseball coach at University of Miami	
Brendan Harris	College of William & Mary	Professional baseball player for multiple teams	
Wynn Hawkins	Baldwin Wallace University	Professional baseball player, Cleveland Indians	
Oral Hildebrand	Butler University	Professional baseball player, Cleveland Indians, New York Yankees, and St. Louis Browns	
Jeff James	Indiana State University	Professional baseball player, Philadelphia Phillies	
Ferguson Jenkins	Honorary member	Professional baseball player for multiple teams and Baseball Hall of Fame member	
Steve Kuczek	Colgate University	Professional baseball player, Boston Braves	
Danny Litwhiler	Bloomsburg University	Professional baseball player for multiple teams and Florida State and Michigan State head baseball coach	
Ralph Mauriello	University of Southern California	Professional baseball player, Los Angeles Dodgers	
Abe Mickal	Louisiana State University	College football player for LSU Tigers and College Football Hall of Fame member	
Chink Outen	North Carolina State University	Professional baseball player, Brooklyn Dodgers	
Rusty Peters	Washington and Lee University	Professional baseball player, Cleveland Indians, Philadelphia Athletics, and St. Louis Browns	
Will Rhymes	College of William & Mary	Professional baseball player, Detroit Tigers and Tampa Bay Rays	
Ron Santo	Honorary member	Professional baseball player, Chicago Cubs and Chicago White Sox	
Jim Schlossnagle	Elon University	Texas A&M head baseball coach	
Steve Shea	University of Massachusetts	Professional baseball player, Houston Astros and Montreal Expos	
Roger Smithberg	Bradley University	Professional baseball player, Oakland Athletics	
Ebba St. Claire	Colgate University	Professional baseball player, Milwaukee Brewers and New York Giants	
Kevin Stocker	University of Washington	Professional baseball player with Anaheim Angels, Philadelphia Phillies, and Tampa Bay Rays	
Syd Thrift	Randolph-Macon College	General manager of Baltimore Orioles and Pittsburgh Pirates and professional scout	
Billy Williams	Honorary member	Professional baseball player, Chicago Cubs and Oakland Athletics and Baseball Hall of Fame member	
Dib Williams	Hendrix College	Professional baseball player, Boston Red Sox and Philadelphia Athletics	

=== Basketball ===
Name	Original chapter	Notability	Ref.
Ronnie Arrow	Texas State University	Head basketball coach, University of South Alabama	
Jimmy Bartolotta	Massachusetts Institute of Technology	Professional basketball player, Iceland's basketball league	
Larry Brown	University of California Los Angeles	Head college and professional basketball coach for multiple teams	
Barney Cable	Bradley University	Professional basketball player for multiple teams	
John Clawson	University of Michigan	Professional basketball player, ABA	
Barry Collier	Butler University	Head college basketball coach, Butler University and University of Nebraska	
Tommy Dempsey	Keystone College	Head college basketball for multiple teams	
Lawrence Frank	Indiana University Bloomington	Detroit Pistons and New Jersey Nets head coach	
Swede Halbrook	Oregon State University	Professional basketball player, tallest player to ever play college or professional basketball at 7 ft 3 in (2.21 m)	
Lars Hansen	University of Washington	Professional basketball player, Seattle SuperSonics and Olympian for Canadian national team	
Scott Hastings	University of Arkansas	Professional basketball player for multiple teams	
Larry Holley	William Jewell College	Head college basketball coach for multiple teams	
Henry Iba	Westminster College	U.S. Olympic basketball team and Basketball Hall of Fame member	
Buddy Jeannette	Washington & Jefferson College	Professional basketball player for multiple teams and member of Basketball Hall of Fame	
Tom Nissalke	Florida State University	Professional basketball coach for multiple teams	
Rick Pitino	University of Massachusetts Amherst	Boston Celtics and Greece Olympic basketball head coach	
Adrian Howard Smith	University of Kentucky	Professional basketball player for multiple teams	

=== Bobsled ===
Name	Original chapter	Notability	Ref.
Charles Butler	Brown University	Bronze medal winner, 1956 Winter Olympics	
Arthur Tyler	University of Michigan	Bronze medal winner, 1956 Winter Olympics	

=== Football ===
Name	Original chapter	Notability	Ref.
Stephen Alexander	Honorary member	Professional football player, Denver Broncos, Detroit Lions, San Diego Chargers, and Washington Redskins	
Bob Baumhower	University of Alabama	Professional football player, Miami Dolphins	
Fred Biletnikoff	Florida State University	Professional football player, Oakland Raiders, and Pro Football Hall of Fame member	
Bill Bradley	University of Texas at Austin	Professional football player, Minnesota Vikings, Philadelphia Eagles, and St. Louis Cardinals	
Leon Brogden	Wake Forest University	Member of Wake Forest University Sports Hall of Fame and North Carolina Sports Hall of Fame	
Mark Bruener	University of Washington	Professional football player, Houston Texans and Pittsburgh Steelers	
Mark Brunell	University of Washington	Professional football quarterback, Green Bay Packers, Jacksonville Jaguars, New Orleans Saints, New York Jets, and Washington Redskins	
Blair Bush	University of Washington	Professional football player, Cincinnati Bengals, Green Bay Packers, Los Angeles Rams, and Seattle Seahawks	
Al Carapella	University of Miami	Professional football player, San Francisco 49ers	
Steve Christie	College of William & Mary	Professional football player, Buffalo Bills, New York Giants, San Diego Chargers, and Tampa Bay Buccaneers	
Fred Cox	University of Pittsburgh	Professional football player, Minnesota Vikings	
Sam Darnold	University of Southern California	Professional football player, Carolina Panthers and New York Jets	
Eddie Dunn	University of Miami	Head college football and baseball coach, University of Miami	
John Fiala	University of Washington	Professional football player, Pittsburgh Steelers	
Bernie Flowers	Purdue University	Professional football player, Baltimore Colts	
Joe Gardi	University of Maryland	Head college football coach, Hofstra University	
John Gordy	University of Tennessee	Professional football player, Detroit Lions	
Nathaniel Hackett	University of California, Davis	Head coach, Denver Broncos	
Marv Hubbard	Colgate University	Professional football player, Detroit Lions and Oakland Raiders	
Gary Huff	Florida State University	Professional football player, Chicago Bears, San Francisco 49ers, and Tampa Bay Buccaneers	
Mark Kelso	College of William and Mary	Professional football player, Buffalo Bills	
Cody Kessler	University of Southern California	Professional football player, Cleveland Browns, Jacksonville Jaguars, and New England Patriots	
Bill Lynch	Butler University	Head college football coach, Ball State University, DePauw University, and Indiana University Bloomington	
Vaughn Mancha	University of Alabama	Professional football player, Boston Yanks	
Bob Masterson	University of Miami	Professional football player, Washington Redskins	
Ed McCrillis	Brown University	Professional football player, Boston Bulldogs and Providence Steam Roller	
Gene McDowell	Florida State University	Head football coach, University of Central Florida	
Paul McGowan	Florida State University	Professional football player, Cleveland Browns and Minnesota Vikings	
Abe Mickal	Louisiana State University	College Football Hall of Fame member	
Bill Miller	University of Miami	Professional football player, Buffalo Bills and Oakland Raiders	
Jim L. Mora	University of Washington	Head coach, University of Connecticut	
Bill Muir	Susquehanna University	Assistant coach, Kansas City Chiefs	
Ray Neal	Washington & Jefferson College	Professional football player and head coach, DePauw University, and Indiana Football Hall of Fame member	
Jim O'Brien	University of Cincinnati	Professional football player, Baltimore Colts and Detroit Lions	
Don Paul	Washington State University	Professional football player, Chicago Cardinals and Cleveland Browns	
Steve Pelluer	University of Washington	Professional football player, Dallas Cowboys and Kansas City Chiefs	
Joe Philbin	Washington & Jefferson College	Professional head coach, Green Bay Packers and Miami Dolphins	
John Rauch	University of Georgia	Professional football player, Philadelphia Eagles, and coach	
Ron Sellers	Florida State University	Professional football player, Dallas Cowboys, Miami Dolphins, and New England Patriots	
Bert Shurtleff	Brown University	Professional football player, Boston Bulldogs and Providence Steam Roller	
Mike Tannenbaum	University of Massachusetts	Executive vice president of football operations, Miami Dolphins	
Joe Tereshinski Sr.	University of Georgia	Professional football player, Washington Redskins	
Aaron Thomas	Oregon State University	Professional football player, New York Giants and San Francisco 49ers	
Charley Trippi	University of Georgia	Professional football player, Chicago Cardinals, and Pro Football Hall of Fame member	
Jim Vollenweider	University of Miami	Professional football player, San Francisco 49ers	
Ray Wersching	University of California, Berkeley	Professional football player, San Diego Chargers and San Francisco 49ers	
Roger Zatkoff	University of Michigan	Professional football player, Detroit Lions and Green Bay Packers	

=== Golf ===
Name	Original chapter	Notability	Ref.
Fred Haas	Louisiana State University	Professional golfer, PGA Tour	
Chuck Kocsis	University of Michigan	NCAA Men's Individual Golf champion	
John Schroeder	University of Michigan	Professional golfer, PGA Tour and Champions Tour	

=== Hydroplane racing ===
Name / Original chapter / Notability / Ref.; Bill Muncey / Boston University / Member of International Motorsports Hall of Fame

=== Professional wrestling ===
Name	Original chapter	Notability	Ref.
Dory Funk Jr.	West Texas A&M University	WWC Universal Heavyweight professional wrestler	
Daniel Rodimer	University of South Florida	WWE professional wrestler under the name "Dan Rodman"	
Merced Solis	West Texas A&M University	WWE professional wrestler under the name "Tito Santana"	

=== Rugby ===
Name / Original chapter / Notability / Ref.; Kyle Winter / Boston University / Professional rugby player, American National Rugby League

=== Soccer ===
Name / Original chapter / Notability / Ref.; Cobi Jones / University of California, Los Angeles / Professional soccer player, LA Galaxy

=== Swimming ===
Name / Original chapter / Notability / Ref.; Doug Gjertsen / University of Texas at Austin / 1988 Summer Olympics gold medal winner

=== Tennis ===
Name / Original chapter / Notability / Ref.; Gardnar Mulloy / University of Miami / International Tennis Hall of Fame member

=== Volleyball ===
Name / Original chapter / Notability / Ref.; Phil Dalhausser / University of Central Florida / Volleyball player and 2008 Summer Olympics gold medal winner

== See also ==
- Lambda Chi Alpha
- List of Lambda Chi Alpha chapters
