= Ryan Blair =

American entrepreneur and author

- Born: July 14, 1977 (age 48)
- Occupation: Entrepreneur
- Known for: Nothing to Lose, Everything to Gain: How I Went from Gang Member to Multimillionaire Entrepreneur

Ryan Blair (born July 14, 1977) is an American entrepreneur and author. He is the former co-founder and chief executive officer of the multi-level marketing company ViSalus Sciences, a subsidiary of the publicly traded company Blyth, Inc.

In 2011, he wrote a book titled Nothing to Lose, Everything to Gain: How I Went from Gang Member to Multimillionaire Entrepreneur which reached The New York Times Best Seller list for hardcover business books. Ernst & Young named Blair as Entrepreneur of the Year for Michigan & Northwest Ohio in 2012.

== Early life ==
Blair was raised in Southern California. A product of a broken family, at the early age of 13, "he was already heavily 'involved in stuff' after his father succumbed to drug addiction," Blair told Business Insider in an interview. He dropped out of high school in the 9th grade, left home, and became a gang member in his home-town of Los Angeles.

When he was 18, Blair's mother began dating a successful real-estate entrepreneur who became Blair's mentor and gave him his first job at Logix Development, a computer technical support provider. At age 21, after serving as vice president of Logix Development he founded the technical-support firm 24/7 Tech.

== Business and writing ==
In 2005, Blair became the CEO of the multi-level marketing company ViSalus Sciences. In 2008, ViSalus was in debt and facing bankruptcy. That year, Blyth Inc. began a multi-stage takeover, paying the three owners $105.7 million and stock valued at $143.2 million for an 80 percent share of the company. Blair remained as CEO. In 2010, Blair won the DSN Global Turn Around Award "when he actually turned the company around from a $6 million debt in early 2008 to $150 million in revenue 16 months later."

In 2011, Blair released an autobiography, Nothing to Lose, Everything to Gain: How I Went from Gang Member to Multimillionaire Entrepreneur. The book was ranked 3rd in The New York Times Best Seller list for August 2011 and was a number one New York Times Hardcover Business Book bestseller in September of that year. Revenue at Blyth declined and the company operated at a loss for 2013 and the first two-quarters of 2014. Blair and his fellow co-founders re-acquired 90 percent of the company that year, eliminating Blyth's obligation to pay for the stock acquired in 2008.

In 2016, Blair released his second book, titled Rock Bottom To Rock Star. The book focuses on teaching individuals how they can become rock-star entrepreneurs, by redefining what rock-star means. "It isn't the celebrations that make you a rock star, it is the hard work" says Blair. In 2018, Kasi Head, a former beauty queen and longtime girlfriend to Blair, filed a restraining order against Blair and alleged the entrepreneur broke her nose and knocked out her teeth.
