= ViSalus =

American multi-level marketing company

Vi
- Industry: Multi-level marketing
- Founded: March 1, 2005
- Founders: Ryan Blair; Blake Mallen (CMO); Nick Sarnicola(CEO)
- Headquarters: Los Angeles, CA, Detroit, USA
- Number of locations: 2
- Area served: USA, Canada, UK
- Products: Dietary supplements
- Number of employees: 275
- Website: vi.com

Vi (formerly ViSalus Sciences) is an American multilevel marketing (MLM) company based in Los Angeles, California, with offices in downtown Detroit, Michigan. The company is mostly known for the Body by Vi 90-Day Challenge platform. The company markets weight management nutritional products, dietary supplements and energy drinks in the United States, Canada, Italy and United Kingdom. Weight management products, including Vi-Shape meal replacement shake and Vi-Trim Clear Control Drink Mix, form the bulk of the company's sales.

== History ==
Vi was originally started in 1997 by Nick Sarnicola and Blake Mallen, two distributors with The Free Network, LLC, a telecommunications MLM company based in Troy, Michigan. After The Free Network folded in March 2005, Vi was purchased by wireless Internet developer Ryan Blair with investment from Ropart Asset Management, a private equity firm owned by Robert B. Goergen. Sarnicola and Mallen were retained as sales chief and CMO, respectively. The company was moved to the San Francisco Bay Area.

The 2008 recession put Vi near bankruptcy, with the business $6 million in debt. In 2008, Vi was acquired by Blyth, Inc., a multi-level marketing company that sells home decor which had been founded by Georgen. In the first stage of the takeover – completed in 2008 – Blyth purchased a 43.6% equity interest for $14.0 million. By 2010 the company had returned to profitability, and Vi was making over $15 million a month. Blyth completed the second phase of the takeover in 2011, investing an additional $2.5 million and increasing their ownership share to 57.5%.

In August 2012, Blyth – which then owned a 73% share of Vi – planned to spin off the company in an initial public offering of shares worth up to $175 million. In September 2012, Moody's Investors Service downgraded Blyth's credit from "stable" to "negative," Vi reported extremely high growth rates in 2012, being audited at 450%, which made it one of the fastest-growing companies of its size. Blyth stated that the company's growth was not properly valued. Blyth withdrew the Vi IPO citing uncertain market conditions. According to the Detroit Free Press, one reason why the Vi IPO was cancelled was because the co-founders were artificially inflating sales numbers: "Vi has been criticized for allegedly puffing up its record sales in 2012 by recruiting top product distributors in the industry. Like mercenaries, these distributors were purportedly willing to switch company affiliation for a price, and after Vi peaked, they jumped to another direct sales company. Such a practice would be legal."

In September 2014, Vi announced that it had become a private, independent company. Vi arranged a transaction with Blyth to convert the company's stock to common stock, although Blyth remains an equity holder with 10% of Vi's stock. The transaction eliminated Blyth's obligation to pay the co-founders $143.2 million as part of the 2008 acquisition. At the time of the transaction, Vi' earnings and revenue had declined from a high-point in 2012, and the company had been operating at a loss for 2013 and the first two quarters of 2014. After becoming private, Vi stopped reporting sales figures.

According to the Detroit Free Press, Vi was at a high of 114,000 distributors in the summer of 2012. According to a report in Crain's Detroit Business, Vi had 76,000 distributors in June 2013, which declined to 31,800 distributors in September 2014. The article also reported that Sarnicola is the largest distributor in Vi, with his distributor team accounting for 74% of company revenue. In 2016 the company laid-off 87 workers at its Troy facility, following years of declining sales and legal problems.

== Controversies ==
=== Racketeering ===
In October 2013, charges were filed in US Federal Court that Nick Sarnicola and Blake Mallen on behalf of Vi committed Racketeer Influenced and Corrupt Organizations Act (RICO) violations, engaged 3rd party individuals to commit criminal acts, extortion and other violations against Fred Ninow & Ken Dunn of Ocean Avenue.

In the lawsuit, Ocean Avenue, a competing direct selling nutrition company, accused Vi officials of hiring two private investigators in California, Nathan Moser and Peter Siragusa, who in turn contracted with computer experts to illegally hack into the files of Ocean Avenue, and former Vi distributors who switched to Ocean Avenue in late 2012. Vi denied the allegations. In July 2015 the two private investigators pleaded guilty to the charges, which are Federal offenses with sentences of one to three years. Vi' security director Carlo Pacileo was convicted and sentenced to three years' probation.

=== Pyramid scheme ===
In 2012, CNBC Commentator Herb Greenberg said Vi walks "a controversial line between legal direct selling and pyramid scheme."

Vi was investigated by the Southern Investigative Reporting Foundation which published a detailed report that assailed the company's business model and high probability that investors will lose their money in the scheme.

In April 2016, a class action suit was filed against Vi, Robert Goergen Sr., Todd Goergen, Nick Sarnicola, Blake Mallen and Ryan Blair in the United States District Court for the Eastern District of Michigan alleging racketeering and fraudulent pyramid scheme selling of distribution rights.

=== Robocalls ===
In April 2019, a jury awarded a plaintiff in a class-action lawsuit $925 million against ViSalus for making millions of robocalls (the money will be distributed amongst the eligible victims), which was upheld by a federal judge in 2020.

== Products ==
Weight-management products, including Vi-Shape meal replacement shake, Vi Go Instant Energy and Vi-Trim Clear Control Drink Mix, form the bulk of the company's sales. Other products include Neuro, an energy drink, and Vi-Pak, an energy supplement, which were both developed by Michael Siedman, an ear, nose, and throat specialist. Vi promotes its products with the Body by Vi Challenge, a program where people set weight-loss and physical fitness goals to be achieved over a 90-day period.

== Locations ==
Vi's products are now available in 16 countries including USA, UK, Italy and Canada. In 2013, Vi launched in the United Kingdom. On February 18, 2014, Vi announced its expansion to Germany and Austria.
