= Dwight Schar =

American businessman (born 1942)

Dwight C. Schar
- Born: 1942 (age 83–84); Ohio
- Education: Ashland University
- Occupations: Home builder, investor and philanthropist
- Known for: Founder of NVR, Inc. homebuilders
- Spouse: Martha Schar
- Website: https://www.dwight-schar.com/

Dwight Schar is an American businessman. He is the founder of NVR, Inc., a Fortune 500 company that is the third-largest home builder (by revenue) in the United States. He currently serves as the company's Executive chairman and Chairman of Executive Committee. Schar was also a minority owner of the Washington Commanders of the National Football League from 2003 to 2021, as well as the former financial chairman for the Republican National Committee.

Schar is also known for his philanthropic efforts, particularly in education and healthcare. He has made donations to various universities and medical institutions, supporting the construction of new buildings and the establishment of specialized institutes. His contributions have been recognized through the naming of several facilities in his honor.

== Early life and career ==
Schar grew up in rural northeast Ohio and graduated from Norwayne High School in 1960. He then attended Ashland University (then Ashland College) in Ashland, Ohio, where he majored in education. After graduating from Ashland in 1964, Dwight began teaching, and on the weekends, he had a job selling homes. Schar soon left teaching to pursue a career in home building.

=== Ryan Homes ===
In 1968, Schar began his career with homebuilding company Ryan Homes, where he headed the company's land acquisition and development efforts in Ohio, Kentucky, and Indiana until 1973. Subsequently, he was appointed vice-president and group manager of Ryan Homes, Inc.'s Washington, D.C., operations, a position he held from 1973 to 1977.

=== NVR ===
In 1980, Schar founded his own homebuilding company, NVHomes, which eventually acquired his former employer, Ryan Homes, in 1987; the company was thus renamed NVR. Schar served as CEO and chairman of NVHomes from 1980 until 1987. In 1992, NVR was forced to declare Chapter 11 bankruptcy; In 1993, NVR emerged from bankruptcy. Schar served as CEO of NVR from 1987 until June 2005 and also served as chairman of the board up until 2022 when he announced his retirement.

=== Public Service and Board Memberships ===
Dwight Schar has served on the President's Advisory Committee on the Arts for the Kennedy Center and was the national finance chair for the Republican National Committee. Additionally, Schar has been a board member for Major League Baseball's Pittsburgh Pirates, First American Banks, the Northern Virginia Building Industry Association, Bell Atlantic Company of Virginia, and the United Way of the National Capital Area.

=== Washington Commanders (formerly Washington Redskins) ===
In 2003 Schar, along with Robert Rothman and Frederick W. Smith, purchased a minority share of the Washington Commanders (formerly Washington Redskins), an American football franchise belonging to the National Football League. The three owned a total of 40% of the team until 2021, when they sold their stake to majority owner Dan Snyder following discontentment with Snyder.

== Philanthropy ==
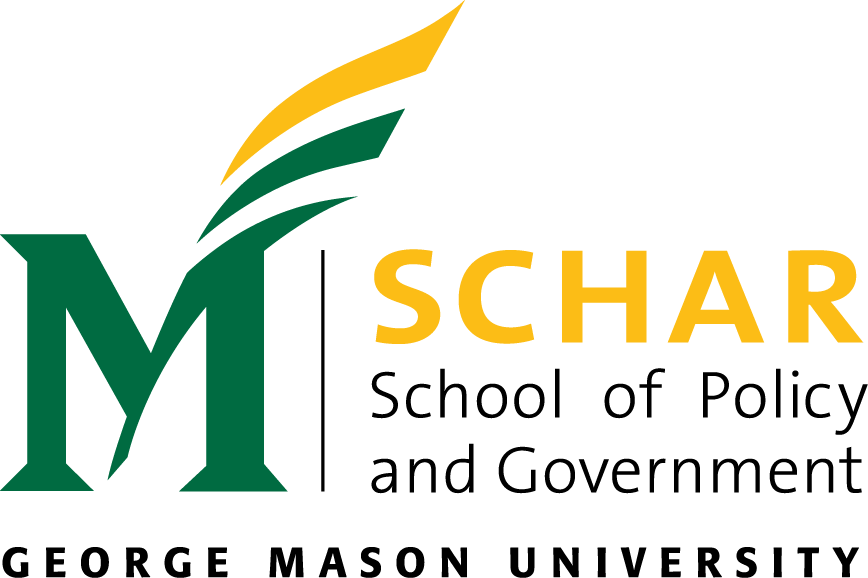
Schar School of Policy and Government logo

In 2006, Schar donated $5 million to his alma mater, Ashland University, to help fund the construction of their new education building. The university named the new building "Dwight Schar College of Education" in his honor. In 2014, Schar donated $12 million to Elon University to help it build two new campus buildings. In May 2016, he donated $10 million to George Mason University's school of policy, government, and international affairs; the school was renamed the Schar School of Policy and Government in his honor.

In 2019 he donated $50 million to establish the pediatric oncology-focused cancer treatment center at Inova Fairfax Hospital, which was named the Inova Schar Cancer Institute. In 2023, Dwight and Martha Schar donated an additional $75 million to Inova Health System's Heart and Vascular Institute, which was renamed Inova Schar Heart & Vascular. The Schars challenged the community to match it by May 31, 2024, naming it "The Schar Challenge." On June 6, 2024, Inova Health System announced it had raised $83 million over the past year, surpassing the challenge. On November 9, 2026, Schar donated $10 million to George Mason University's Schar School of Policy and Government.

== Political involvement ==
Along with his involvement in the Republican National Committee, Schar is also a well-known financial supporter of the Republican Party and numerous Republican candidates, making contributions through his company as well as private contributions from both his McLean, VA home and his home in Palm Beach, FL. In 1989, Virginia Republican gubernatorial candidate Marshall Coleman was backed financially by Schar. An investigation from the Richmond Times-Dispatch had discovered that one of Schar's companies had issued loans through the Virginia Housing Development Authority.

In both the 2000 and 2004 Bush Cheney presidential campaigns, Schar was not only a donor, but also a major fundraiser. In the 2000 campaign, Schar was a "Bush pioneer," the distinction given to those committed to raising $100,000 or more for the campaign. In the 2004 re-election campaign, Schar rose to the new level of "Ranger," raising $200,000 or more.

== Congressional letter and investigation ==
Ryan Homes, a business under the NVR umbrella, received a letter from Senator Sherrod Brown (D-OH) which asked the company to stop the practice of forced arbitration. Three senators joined in and asked that both Ryan Homes and NVR "remove the arbitration provisions from their agreements and stop requiring homebuyers to sign non-disclosure agreements in order to resolve disputes." USA Today conducted an investigation that found that Ryan Homes "ignored warranty requests for dozens if not hundreds of customers nationally."

== Class-action lawsuit ==
A lawsuit filed by homeowners in Bella Collina, a community run by DCS Capital Investments, accused Randall Greene of "racketeering, embezzling, and conspiracy." The lawsuit stated that the homeowners association (HOA) should have been turned over to the homeowners instead of DCS Capital Investments; the suit was dismissed by a federal court a year later.
