= Warren A. Cole =

Founder of Lambda Chi Alpha fraternity

Warren Albert Cole
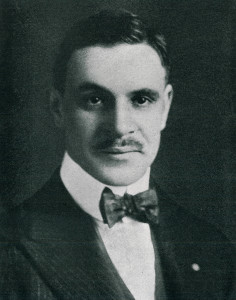
- Born: November 15, 1889; Swansea, Massachusetts, U.S.
- Died: December 29, 1968 (aged 79); Fall River, Massachusetts, U.S.
- Resting place: Rehoboth, Massachusetts, U.S.
- Education: LL.B, 1912 Boston University School of Law
- Occupation(s): Businessman, Lawyer
- Known for: Founder of Lambda Chi Alpha fraternity
- Spouse(s): Lottie Mae Hathaway Cole (1910–1919); Ethalyn Brayton Chace (1919–1968)

Warren Albert Cole (November 15, 1889 – December 29, 1968) was an American businessman and lawyer and is known as the founder of Lambda Chi Alpha Fraternity.

== Early life and education ==
Cole was born in 1889 in Swansea, Massachusetts, the son of Albert Warren Cole and Mary Horton Nichols. He attended high school at B.M.C. Durfee High School in Fall River, Massachusetts, where he graduated in 1908. While there, he was a member of Alpha Mu Chi, a fraternity that may have shaped his future views for a collegiate organization.

After graduation, a year of work, and a few weeks as a student at Brown University, Cole entered the Boston University School of Law in Boston in 1909, where he became a member of the Gamma Eta Gamma law school fraternity. He started several fraternities that never caught on, including The Lodge, Tombs, and Lambda Pi. After Lambda Pi, he founded Lambda Chi Alpha, meaning "Loyal Collegiate Associates" before its name was changed in 1912.

Cole was one of the three founders of Lambda Chi Alpha when it started on November 2, 1909. He graduated from Boston University with a Bachelor of Laws degree in 1912. He then set about the work of continuing to build an international fraternity.

== Career ==
Cole held many different jobs during his lifetime such as store owner, jewelry salesman, an assistant at the Brown University Student Union, member of the Massachusetts Highway Commission, insurance salesman, and as a Pinkerton detective.

== Personal life ==
Cole was married twice during his lifetime. He married his first wife on September 13, 1910, and they lived in Boston. They had three children, Irma Cole Pollard, Albert Warren Cole, and Nathan Waren Cole. He married Ethalyn Brayton Chace on August 28, 1919, in Barrington, Rhode Island. Cole had three more children during his second marriage. His two sons, Albert and Nathan, never became Lambda Chi Alpha members.

In addition to holding Lambda Chi Alpha’s highest office, he was the administrative and traveling secretary and the editor and treasurer of Purple, Green, and Gold magazine throughout World War I. During his tenure in office, the fraternity grew to 53 functioning chapters. Cole resigned his membership in Lambda Chi Alpha in 1920 under allegations of financial irregularities and the alteration of official fraternity documents by other members of the fraternity's governing body. However, in 1957, he was reinstated as a member in good standing.

He was also a member of the Loyal Order of Moose, grand chancellor of the Rhode Island Knights of Pythias, a better than 50-year member of the Pioneer Masonic Lodge in Somerset, Massachusetts, and a member of the National Grange of the Order of Patrons of Husbandry.

Cole died on December 29, 1968, in Fall River, Massachusetts. He was buried in a family plot at a cemetery in Rehoboth, Massachusetts in January 1969. His first wife Lottie is buried with him.

A future historic marker is planned for Swansea, Massachusetts, to commemorate Cole.

== See also ==
- History of Lambda Chi Alpha fraternity
