= Dale Carlsen =

American businessman

Dale R. Carlsen founded The Sleep Train Mattress Center in 1985, and has guided the company to become the largest retailer of mattresses on the West Coast, and one of the top three in the United States. In 2002, Dale purchased 54 of Mattress Discounters' stores in California during that company's bankruptcy—more than doubling Sleep Train's size. In August 2006, Dale purchased Sleep Country USA from Simmons Bedding in a move to re-enter the northwestern market.

He is a 1984 graduate of Sacramento State University in the College of Business Administration and a member of Lambda Chi Alpha fraternity. In 2013, Carlsen was awarded an honorary doctorate degree from Sacramento State University "for his work and contributions on behalf of foster children"

== Awards ==
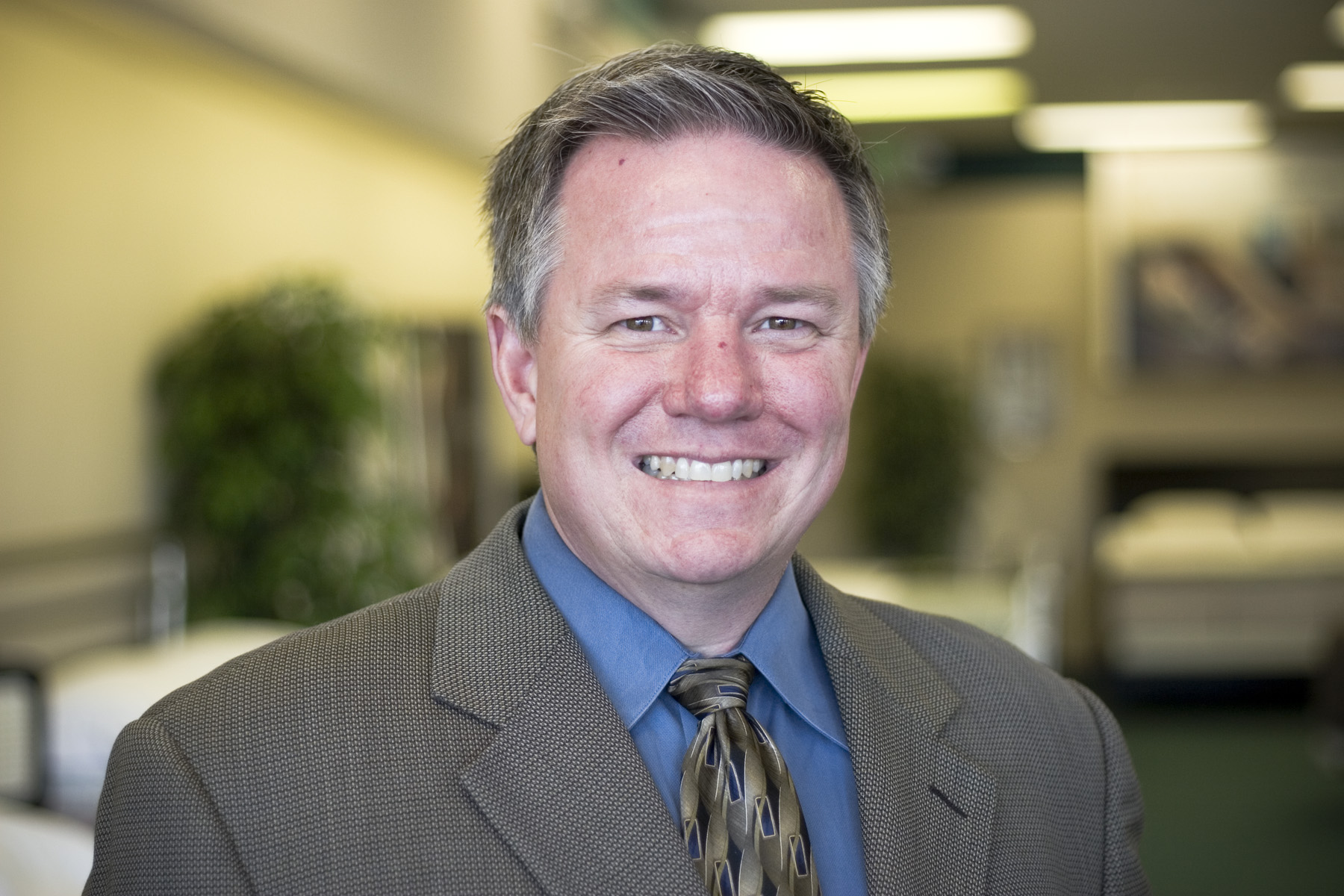
Dale Carlsen, Founder and CEO of The Sleep Train, Inc.

- "2013 Award for Economic Leadership" - Valley Vision
- "Sacramentan of the Year" - Sacramento Metro Chamber, 2012.
- Ernst & Young Entrepreneur Of The Year 2012 Award
- "Distinguished Alumni Award" - Lambda Chi Alpha Fraternity, 2007
- Sacramento Metro Chamber Businessman of the Year, 2005
- "Business Hall of Fame Honoree" - Junior Achievement of Sacramento, 2005
- "Father of the Year" - Father's Day Council benefiting American Diabetes Association of Sacramento, 2005
- "Alumnus of the Year" - California State University, Sacramento's College of Business Administration, 2001
- "Volunteer of the Year" - Junior Achievement, 2000
