= List of Lambda Chi Alpha chapters =

Lambda Chi Alpha is an international men's collegiate fraternity. In 1939, Lambda Chi Alpha merged with Theta Kappa Nu and absorbed 28 active chapters, plus seven on campuses where Lambda Chi Alpha was already represented. In 2021, the general assembly of the Lambda Chi Alpha fraternity voted to switch from a "colony" and "colonization" model to an "associate chapter" and "expansion" model.

== Naming ==
Lambda Chi Alpha chapters are known as subordinate Zetas, or simply Zetas. As such, the Alpha chapter at Boston University, the fraternity's first chapter, is referred to as Alpha Zeta. Zetas are identified by Greek letters in a unique scrambled alphabet naming scheme.

At the fraternity's inception, founder Warren A. Cole assigned Greek letters to petitioning groups that had not yet been chartered. Not all of these groups were chartered. As a result, the first seven chapters were designated Α, Γ, Ε, Ζ, Ι, Λ, and Β, in that order. John E. Mason created a 24-word mnemonic device with words representing each Greek letter once; the first seven words were in the order that the chapters were already named.

A good energetic Zeta is Lambda's boast; ‘Strength from Delta Pi’, our motto, to each through union; excellent character only, knowing no retreating steps.

Therefore, the chapters are named in the order: Α, Γ, Ε, Ζ, Ι, Λ, Β, Σ, Φ, Δ, Π, Ο, Μ, Τ, Η, Θ, Υ, Ξ, Χ, Ω, Κ, Ν, Ρ, Ψ. After the twenty-fourth chapter, the sequence was continued with a prefix and hyphen (Α-Α, Α-Γ, Α-Ε, ... Γ-Α, Γ-Γ, Γ-Ε, ... Ε-A, etc.)

When Theta Kappa Nu merged with Lambda Chi Alpha in 1939, former Theta Kappa Nu chapters were assigned chapter designations prefixed with Theta, Kappa, or Nu. The second letter of their chapter name was assigned in the order mentioned above and applied to the chapters in order of their precedence in Theta Kappa Nu; e.g., Theta Kappa Nu's Alpha chapter at Howard College (now Samford University) became Theta Alpha Zeta. On 21 campuses, chapters of both Lambda Chi Alpha and Theta Kappa Nu existed. In those cases, the chapter of Lambda Chi Alpha kept its original designation, and the letter which would have been assigned to the chapter of Theta Kappa Nu was permanently retired. A singular exception is the chapter at Georgia Tech, Beta-Kappa Zeta, which was named in recognition of its existence as a chapter of Beta Kappa, a national fraternity whose other existing chapters merged with Theta Chi in 1942. Note that the Theta Kappa Nu chapters at Baker University (Kansas Alpha / Theta-Beta), the College of Idaho (Kappa-Psi), Oglethorpe University (Georgia Alpha / Kappa-Beta), and Westminster College (Missouri Beta / Theta-Omicron) were inactive at the time of the merger with Lambda Chi Alpha and are, therefore, not included in the following list.

== Chapters ==
In the following list, active chapters are indicated in bold and Inactive chapters in italics.

Chapter	Charter date and range	Institution	Location	Status	Ref.
**Alpha**	November 2, 1909 – 1970; 1983	Boston University	Boston, Massachusetts	Active	(Note: Chapter formed from the Cosmopolitan Law Club (local), established in 1905.)
Gamma	1912–1978, 2003–2010	University of Massachusetts Amherst	Amherst, Massachusetts	Inactive	
Epsilon	1912–1956, 1999–2021	University of Pennsylvania	Philadelphia, Pennsylvania	Inactive	
**Zeta**	1912	Pennsylvania State University	State College, Pennsylvania	Active	(Note: Chapter formed from the Society of Good Fellowship (local), established in 1912.)
Iota	1912–1968	Brown University	Providence, Rhode Island	Inactive	(Note: Chapter formed from the Alpha Brotherhood of Sigma Phi Delta, established in 1907.)
**Lambda**	1912–2014, 2025	Massachusetts Institute of Technology	Cambridge, Massachusetts	Associate Chapter	(Note: Chapter was suspended in October 2014 for at least five years due to poor conduct.)
Beta	1913–1987, 1994–2024	University of Maine	Orono, Maine	Inactive	(Note: Chapter formed from Delta Kappa, established in 1908.)
**Sigma**	1913–1995, 2003	University of Michigan	Ann Arbor, Michigan	Active	(Note: Chapter absorbed Mu Psi (local). In 1929, it also absorbed the Michigan Alpha chapter of Theta Kappa Nu, established in 1928)
Phi	1913–1998	Rutgers University–New Brunswick	New Brunswick, New Jersey	Inactive	
**Delta**	1913–1983, 1985	Bucknell University	Lewisburg, Pennsylvania	Active	(Note: Chapter formed from Alpha Sigma, established in 1900.)
**Pi**	1913–1988, 1994	Worcester Polytechnic Institute	Worcester, Massachusetts	Active	(Note: Chapter formed from Zeta Sigma Tau, established in 1912.)
**Omicron**	1913	Cornell University	Ithaca, New York	Active	(Note: Chapter formed from ISWZA, established in 1908. In 1939, it absorbed the New York Gamma chapter of Theta Kappa Nu, established in 1931.)
Mu	1913–2006	University of California, Berkeley	Berkeley, California	Inactive	(Note: Chapter formed from the Skulls, established in 1909. In 1939, it absorbed the California Alpha chapter of Theta Kappa Nu, established in 1928;)
**Tau**	1914	Washington State University	Pullman, Washington	Active	(Note: Chapter formed from Tolo Club, established in 1913.)
**Eta**	1914	University of Rhode Island	Kingston, Rhode Island	Active	(Note: Chapter formed from Gamma Delta Sigma, established in 1912.)
Theta	1914–1933	Dartmouth College	Hanover, New Hampshire	Inactive	(Note: Chapter formed from the Occom Club, established in 1914.)
Upsilon	1914–2017	Louisiana State University	Baton Rouge, Louisiana	Inactive	(Note: Chapter formed from the YYO Club, established in 1910. In 1939, it absorbed the Louisiana Alpha chapter of Theta Kappa Nu, established in 1925.)
Xi	1915–1995	DePauw University	Greencastle, Indiana	Inactive	(Note: Chapter formed from the Darsee Club, established in 1912. It absorbed Gamma Rho Alpha in 1938. In 1939, it absorbed the Indiana Beta chapter of Theta Kappa Nu, established in 1925.)
Chi	1915–2019	University of Illinois Urbana-Champaign	Champaign, Illinois	Inactive	(Note: Chapter formed from Delta Omega, established in 1911. It absorbed Anubis (local) i 1933. In 1939, it absorbed the Illinois Beta chapter of Theta Kappa Nu, established in 1926.)
**Omega**	1915	Auburn University	Auburn, Alabama	Active	(Note: Chapter formed from Delta Pi Sigma, established in 1908 at the Alabama Polytechnic Institute, now Auburn University. In 1939, it absorbed the Alabama Gamma chapter of Theta Kappa Nu, established in 1926.)
Kappa	1915–1937	Knox College	Galesburg, Illinois	Inactive	(Note: Chapter formed from Sigma Zeta, established in 1914.)
**Nu**	1915–1987, 1990–2020, 202x ?	University of Georgia	Athens, Georgia	Active	(Note: Chapter formed from Trigon, established in 1915.)
Rho	1915–1940	Union College	Schenectady, New York	Inactive	(Note: Chapter formed from Theta Lambda Phi, established in 1915.)
Psi	1915–2016	Purdue University	West Lafayette, Indiana	Inactive	(Note: Chapter formed from the Aeolian Club (local), established in 1908.)
**Alpha-Alpha**	1915–2017, 2020	Butler University	Indianapolis, Indiana	Active	(Note: Chapter formed from Delta Alpha Phi, established in 1914.)
**Alpha-Gamma**	1916	University of South Dakota	Vermillion, South Dakota	Active	(Note: Chapter formed from Sigma Delta Upsilon, established in 1914.)
Alpha-Epsilon	1916–1933	Harvard University	Cambridge, Massachusetts	Inactive	(Note: Chapter formed by the Alumni of LCA, established in 1916.)
Alpha-Zeta	1916–1968	Colgate University	Hamilton, New York	Inactive	
**Alpha-Iota**	1917–1996, 2001	Northwestern University	Evanston, Illinois	Active	(Note: Chapter formed from Poledon Fraternity, established in 1915.)
**Alpha-Lambda**	1917	Oregon State University	Corvallis, Oregon	Active	(Note: Chapter formed from the Umatilla Club (local), established in 1914. In 1939, it absorbed the Oregon Alpha chapter of Theta Kappa Nu, established in 1930.)
Alpha-Beta	1917–1941, 1946–1968	University of Wisconsin–Madison	Madison, Wisconsin	Inactive	(Note: Chapter formed from the Crescent Club (local), established in 1917. In 1939, it absorbed the Wisconsin Alpha chapter of Theta Kappa Nu, established in 1931.)
Alpha-Sigma	1917–1948	Cumberland University	Lebanon, Tennessee	Inactive	(Note: Chapter formed from the Giraffe Club, established in 1916. In 1934, it absorbed Delta Kappa Phi, established in 1929.)
**Alpha-Phi**	1917	University of Alabama	Tuscaloosa, Alabama	Active	(Note: Chapter formed from Iris Club, established in 1917.)
**Alpha-Delta**	1917	Missouri University of Science and Technology	Rolla, Missouri	Active	(Note: Chapter formed from the Muckers' Club, established in 1913.)
**Alpha-Pi**	1917	University of Denver	Denver, Colorado	Active	(Note: Chapter formed from Pi Theta Kappa, established in 1917. In 1933, it absorbed Eta Omega Delta, established in 1923.)
**Alpha-Omicron**	1917	Indiana University Bloomington	Bloomington, Indiana	Active	(Note: Chapter formed from Independent Literary Society (local), established in 1917.)
**Alpha-Mu**	1917–1936, 1940–1995, 2001	University of Texas at Austin	Austin, Texas	Active	(Note: Chapter formed from Sigma Phi Sigma, established in 1910.)
**Alpha-Tau**	1917–1934, 1948–2021, 2025	Iowa State University	Ames, Iowa	Associate Chapter	(Note: Chapter formed from the Alamo Club, established in 1909.)
**Alpha-Eta**	1917	Oklahoma State University	Stillwater, Oklahoma	Active	(Note: Chapter formed from Chi Alpha, established in 1917.)
Alpha-Theta	1917–1980	Franklin & Marshall College	Lancaster, Pennsylvania	Inactive	(Note: Chapter formed from the Harbaugh Club (local), established in 1900.)
**Alpha-Upsilon**	1918–1997, 2016	Syracuse University	Syracuse, New York	Active	(Note: Chapter formed from the Commons Club (local), established in 1917.)
**Alpha-Xi**	1918	University of New Hampshire	Durham, New Hampshire	Active	(Note: Chapter formed from Beta Phi, established in 1906.)
**Alpha-Chi**	1918–1990, 2011	University of Richmond	Richmond, Virginia	Active	(Note: Chapter formed from Sigma Delta Chi, established in 1916.)
Alpha-Omega	1918–1937, 1950–1969, 1975–2020	Ohio University	Athens, Ohio	Inactive	(Note: Chapter formed from Alpha Tau Epsilon, established in 1917. After going dormant, it was reformed in 1950 from Lambda Chi Delta, established in 1948. In 1975, it reformed from Alpha Chi Lambda, established in 1972.)
**Alpha-Kappa**	1918	Wabash College	Crawfordsville, Indiana	Active	
Alpha-Nu	1918–1963	Case Western Reserve University	Cleveland, Ohio	Inactive	(Note: Chapter formed from the Skethoi Club, a member of the Affiliated National Federation of Commons Clubs from 1916 to 1918.)
Alpha-Rho	1918–1984	Colby College	Waterville, Maine	Inactive	(Note: In 1939, Alpha-Rho absorbed the Maine Alpha chapter of Theta Kappa Nu, established in 1929. The chapter went inactive when Greek letter organizations were banned on campus.)
**Alpha-Psi**	1918	University of Washington	Seattle, Washington	Active	(Note: Chapter formed from the Library Commons Club (Affiliated National Federation of Commons Clubs), established in 1915.)
**Gamma-Alpha**	1919	University of Akron	Akron, Ohio	Active	(Note: Chapter formed from Sigma Beta, established in 1914.)
**Gamma-Gamma**	1919–1985, 1988	University of Cincinnati	Cincinnati, Ohio	Active	(Note: Chapter formed from Sigma Phi Alpha, established in 1916.)
**Gamma-Epsilon**	1919–1964, 1981–201x, ?	University of Pittsburgh	Pittsburgh, Pennsylvania	Associate chapter	(Note: Chapter formed from Omega Pi Alpha, established in 1916. In 1939, it absorbed the Pennsylvania Delta chapter of Theta Kappa Nu, established in 1927.) (Note: Chapter reformed as a colony (associate chapter), in the spring of 2025.)
Gamma-Zeta	1919–2000	Washington & Jefferson College	Washington, Pennsylvania	Inactive	(Note: Chapter formed from The Barracks (local), established in 1911. In 1939, it absorbed the Pennsylvania Gamma chapter of Theta Kappa Nu, established in 1925.)
**Gamma-Iota**	1919	Denison University	Granville, Ohio	Active	(Note: Chapter formed from the Sycamore Fraternity, established in 1910.)
Gamma-Lambda	1920–1937	University of Chicago	Chicago, Illinois	Inactive	(Note: Chapter formed from the Phoenix Club, established in 1919.)
**Gamma-Beta**	1921–1939, 1974–2016	University of Nebraska–Lincoln	Lincoln, Nebraska	Associate chapter	(Note: Chapter formed from Kappa Delta Phi, established in 1919.) (Note: Chapter reformed as a colony (associate chapter) in 2024.)
Gamma-Sigma	1921–2016	Southern Methodist University	Dallas, Texas	Inactive	(Note: Chapter formed from Gamma Delta, established in 1920. In 1939, it absorbed the Texas Alpha chapter of Theta Kappa Nu, established in 1932.)
**Gamma-Phi**	1922	Washington and Lee University	Lexington, Virginia	Active	(Note: Chapter formed from Delta Eta Sigma, established in 1920.)
**Gamma-Delta**	1922–1938, 1993–2013, 2020	Vanderbilt University	Nashville, Tennessee	Active	(Note: Chapter formed from the Phoenix Club, established in 1921. After going dormant, it reformed in 1993 from Chi Chi Chi, established in 1981.)
**Gamma-Pi**	1922–2000, 2020-	Colorado State University	Fort Collins, Colorado	Active	(Note: Chapter formed from Alpha Tau Mu, established in 1919.)
Gamma-Omicron	1922–1990, 1991–2017	Michigan State University	East Lansing, Michigan	Inactive	(Note: Chapter formed from the Forensic Literary Society, established in 1907. In 1939, it absorbed the Michigan Beta chapter of Theta Kappa Nu, established in 1930.)
**Gamma-Mu**	1923–1937, 1947–1971, 1985–2005	University of Colorado Boulder	Boulder, Colorado	Associate chapter	(Note: Chapter formed from the Alhambra Club, established in 1922.)
Gamma-Tau	1923–1982, 1985–2020	Ohio State University	Columbus, Ohio	Inactive	(Note: Chapter formed from Pi Sigma Alpha, established in 1921.)
Gamma-Eta	1924–1958	Hamilton College	Kirkland, New York	Inactive	(Note: Chapter formed from Beta Kappa, established in 1918.)
Gamma-Theta	1924–1969	Duke University	Durham, North Carolina	Inactive	(Note: Chapter formed from Beta Pi, established in 1921.)
**Gamma-Upsilon**	1924–1934, 1939–1998, 201x ?	North Carolina State University	Raleigh, North Carolina	Active	(Note: Chapter formed from Pi Alpha, established in 1920. After going dormant, it reformed in 1939 from the North Carolina Alpha chapter of Theta Kappa Nu, established in 1924.)
**Gamma-Xi**	1924–1937, 1948	Kansas State University	Manhattan, Kansas	Active	(Note: Chapter formed from the Elkhart Club, established in 1915.)
**Gamma-Chi**	1925	University of Arkansas	Fayetteville, Arkansas	Active	(Note: Chapter formed from Theta Phi Delta, established in 1922. In 1939, it absorbed the Arkansas Alpha chapter of Theta Kappa Nu, established in 1926.)
Gamma-Omega	1925–1938, 1948–1958	University of Minnesota	Minneapolis, Minnesota	Inactive	(Note: Chapter formed from the Sphinx Club, established in 1923. In 1939, it absorbed the Minnesota Alpha chapter of Theta Kappa Nu, established in 1925.)
**Gamma-Kappa**	1926–1998, 2004-2020, 2026	University of Missouri	Columbia, Missouri	Associate Chapter	(Note: Chapter formed from Lambda Pi Epsilon, established in 1922.)
**Gamma-Nu**	1926–1985, 1986	University of North Carolina at Chapel Hill	Chapel Hill, North Carolina	Active	(Note: Chapter formed from Gamma Delta, established in 1922. Later, it absorbed Sigma Delta. In 1939, it absorbed the North Carolina Gamma chapter of Theta Kappa Nu, established in 1925.)
**Gamma-Rho**	1926–1937, 1946	University of Oklahoma	Norman, Oklahoma	Active	(Note: Chapter formed from Sigma Phi, established in 1923.)
Gamma-Psi	1926–2014	Lehigh University	Bethlehem, Pennsylvania	Inactive	(Note: Chapter formed from Delta Theta, established in 1922.)
Epsilon-Alpha	1927–2013, 2018-2021	College of William & Mary	Williamsburg, Virginia	Inactive	(Note: Chapter formed from Alpha Tau Epsilon, established in 1922.)
**Epsilon-Gamma**	1927–1942, 1948–1998, 2009	University of Idaho	Moscow, Idaho	Active	(Note: Chapter formed from Sigma Pi Rho, established in 1924.)
**Epsilon-Epsilon**	1927	University of Toronto	Toronto, Ontario, Canada	Active	(Note: Chapter formed from Alpha Epsilon, established in 1916.)
**Epsilon-Zeta**	1928	University of North Dakota	Grand Forks, North Dakota	Active	(Note: Chapter formed from Pi Rho Chi, established in 1920.)
**Epsilon-Iota**	1929–2012, 2019	University of Nevada, Reno	Reno, Nevada	Active	(Note: Chapter formed from Kappa Lambda, established in 1921. The university suspended the chapter for alcohol violations in 2012.)
Epsilon-Lambda	1929–1935	Carnegie Mellon University	Pittsburgh, Pennsylvania	Inactive	(Note: Chapter formed from Kappa Sigma Rho (local), which had disaffiliated from the National Federation of Commons Clubs in 1918.)
Epsilon-Beta	1929–1937	Emory University	Atlanta, Georgia	Inactive	(Note: Chapter formed from Beta Tau, established in 1924.)
**Epsilon-Sigma**	1930–2000, 2011	University of California, Los Angeles	Los Angeles, California	Active	(Note: Chapter formed from Pi Theta Phi, established in 1925.)
**Epsilon-Phi**	1930–2010, 2025	University of Kentucky	Lexington, Kentucky	Associate Chapter	(Note: Chapter formed from Alpha Gamma Epsilon, established in 1922.)
Epsilon-Delta	1931–2006	Montana State University	Bozeman, Montana	Inactive	(Note: Chapter formed from Delta Tau (local), established in 1926. In 1933, it absorbed Amigo (local), established in 1923.)
**Epsilon-Pi**	1932–1974, 1998	University of Maryland, College Park	College Park, Maryland	Active	(Note: Chapter formed from Sigma Tau Omega, established in 1921.)
**Epsilon-Omicron**	1932–2016, 2021	University of Tennessee	Knoxville, Tennessee	Active	(Note: Chapter formed from Zeta Tau Lambda, established in 1927. The national fraternity closed the chapter in February 2016 for five years for multiple hazing and alcohol violations over three years.)
**Epsilon-Mu**	1933–1941, 1946	University of Florida	Gainesville, Florida	Active	(Note: Chapter formed from Sigma Lambda Tau, established in 1924. In 1939, it absorbed the Florida Beta chapter of Theta Kappa Nu, established in 1924)
Epsilon-Tau	1934–1942	Colorado College	Colorado Springs, Colorado	Inactive	(Note: Chapter formed from Delta Alpha Phi, established in 1924.)
**Epsilon-Eta**	1937–1971, 1975	Rensselaer Polytechnic Institute	Troy, New York	Active	(Note: Chapter formed from the Kappa chapter of Delta Sigma Lambda, established in 1931.)
Epsilon-Theta	1937–1973	Washington College	Chestertown, Maryland	Inactive	(Note: Chapter formed from Phi Sigma Tau, established in 1928.)
**Epsilon-Upsilon**	1937	University of Tulsa	Tulsa, Oklahoma	Active	(Note: Chapter formed from Sigma Theta Tau, established in 1927.)
**Epsilon-Xi**	1938–1962, 1979	Florida Southern College	Lakeland, Florida	Active	(Note: Chapter formed from Theta Kappa Psi, established in 1926.)
**Epsilon-Chi**	1939	Mississippi State University	Starkville, Mississippi	Active	(Note: Chapter formed from Rho Zeta (local), established in 1937. In 1939, it absorbed the Mississippi Beta chapter of Theta Kappa Nu, established in 1938.)
**Theta-Alpha**	1939	Samford University	Homewood, Alabama	Active	(Note: Formed from a chapter of Theta Kappa Nu, established in 1924.)
Theta-Gamma	1939–1970, 2014–202x ?	Rollins College	Winter Park, Florida	Inactive	
**Theta-Zeta**	1939–1983, 1986	Hanover College	Hanover, Indiana	Active	
Theta-Iota	1939–1974	Iowa Wesleyan College	Mount Pleasant, Iowa	Inactive	
**Theta-Lambda**	1939	Simpson College	Indianola, Iowa	Active	
**Theta-Sigma**	1939	Drury University	Springfield, Missouri	Active	
**Theta-Delta**	1939	Oklahoma City University	Oklahoma City, Oklahoma	Active	
**Theta-Pi**	1939–1998, 2003	Gettysburg College	Gettysburg, Pennsylvania	Active	
Theta-Mu	1939–1984	Birmingham-Southern College	Birmingham, Alabama	Inactive	
**Theta-Tau**	1939–1984, 2000	Wake Forest University	Winston-Salem, North Carolina	Active	(Note: After going inactive, the chapter was reformed in 2000 from The Chis (local), established in 1994.)
**Theta-Eta**	1939	Millsaps College	Jackson, Mississippi	Active	
Theta Theta	1939–1970	Clark University	Worcester, Massachusetts	Inactive	(Note: Formed from a chapter of Theta Kappa Nu, established in 1925.) (Note: Absorbed Alpha Sigma Alpha in 1939.)
**Theta-Upsilon**	1939	New York University Tandon School of Engineering	Brooklyn, New York	Active	(Note: Chapter was formed from the New York Alpha chapter of Theta Kappa Nu, established at the Brooklyn Collegiate and Polytechnic Institute in 1925. The chapter became affiliated with NYU following the merger of Polytechnic University and New York University in 2008.)
Theta-Xi	1939–1993	Thiel College	Greenville, Pennsylvania	Inactive	
**Theta-Chi**	1939–1991, 1996	Eureka College	Eureka, Illinois	Active	
**Theta-Kappa**	1939	Rose–Hulman Institute of Technology	Terre Haute, Indiana	Active	
Theta-Rho	1939–1958	Centenary College of Louisiana	Shreveport, Louisiana	Inactive	
Theta-Psi	1939–1999	Louisiana Tech University	Ruston, Louisiana	Inactive	
Kappa-Alpha	1939–1994, 2002–2025	Marietta College	Marietta, Ohio	Inactive	
Kappa-Gamma	1942–xxxx ?	Franklin College	Franklin, Indiana	Inactive	(Note: This was a revival of a Theta Kappa Nu chapter that operated between 1925 and 1932, going dormant before the merger of the two fraternities.)
Kappa-Sigma	1939–1992, 2001–2002	Alfred University	Alfred, New York	Inactive	
**Kappa-Phi**	1939–1994, 2014	Baldwin Wallace University	Berea, Ohio	Active	(Note: Formed from a chapter of Theta Kappa Nu, established in 1926.)
Kappa-Omicron	1939–1950	Wofford College	Spartanburg, South Carolina	Inactive	
**Kappa-Mu**	1939	Culver–Stockton College	Canton, Missouri	Active	
**Kappa-Tau**	1939–2007, 2026	Randolph–Macon College	Ashland, Virginia	Active	
Kappa-Eta	1939–2004, 2008–2012	Hampden–Sydney College	Hampden-Sydney, Virginia	Inactive	
**Kappa-Upsilon**	1939–1989, 2008	Bradley University	Peoria, Illinois	Active	(Note: Formed from a chapter of Theta Kappa Nu, established in 1927.)
**Kappa-Omega**	1939	Georgetown College	Georgetown, Kentucky	Active	(Note: Formed from the Kentucky Alpha chapter of Theta Kappa Nu, established in 1928.)
Nu-Epsilon	1940–1979	Muhlenberg College	Allentown, Pennsylvania	Inactive	(Note: This chapter was a revival of the Pennsylvania Eta chapter of Theta Kappa Nu, which was active from 1931 to 1937 and went inactive before the merger with Lambda Chi Alpha.)
Nu-Zeta	1939–2021	Wittenberg University	Springfield, Ohio	Inactive	(Note: Formed from a chapter of Theta Kappa Nu, established in 1932.)
**Epsilon-Omega**	1940	University of Miami	Coral Gables, Florida	Active	(Note: Chapter formed from Delta Sigma Kappa, established in 1927.)
**Epsilon-Kappa**	1941–2006, 2009	Drexel University	Philadelphia, Pennsylvania	Active	(Note: Chapter formed from Alpha Upsilon Mu, established in 1924.)
**Epsilon-Nu**	1942	William Jewell College	Liberty, Missouri	Active	(Note: Chapter formed from Zeta Chi, established in 1917.)
**Epsilon-Rho**	1945	University of Alberta	Edmonton, Alberta, Canada	Active	(Note: Chapter formed from Alpha Chi, established in 1940.)
Epsilon-Psi	1945–2019	University of South Carolina	Columbia, South Carolina	Inactive	
Zeta-Alpha	1946–2021	Coe College	Cedar Rapids, Iowa	Inactive	(Note: Chapter formed from Alpha Delta Alpha, established in 1921.)
**Zeta-Gamma**	1946–1972, 1978–1998, 200x ?	New Mexico State University	Las Cruces, New Mexico	Active	(Note: Chapter formed from Phi Beta Theta, established in 1927.)
**Zeta-Epsilon**	1946–1980, 1986–200x ?, 200x ?	University of Texas at El Paso	El Paso, Texas	Active	(Note: Chapter formed from Rho Sigma Tau, established in 1939. After going dormant, it was revived in 1986 by absorbing Delta Tau Lambda.)
Zeta-Zeta	1946–2005	Marshall University	Huntington, West Virginia	Inactive	
**Zeta-Iota**	1947	University of Kansas	Lawrence, Kansas	Active	
Zeta-Lambda	1947–1950, 1955–1970, 1988–2010	University of Connecticut	Storrs, Connecticut	Inactive	(Note: After its first period of dormancy the chapter was revived in 1955 by absorbing Lambda Chi, established in 1950.)
Zeta-Beta	1947–1971, 1981–2000	University of Arizona	Tucson, Arizona	Inactive	
**Zeta-Sigma**	1948	University of Louisville	Louisville, Kentucky	Active	
**Zeta-Phi**	1948	University of Tennessee at Chattanooga	Chattanooga, Tennessee	Active	
**Zeta-Delta**	1948–1979, 1981	University of Southern California	Los Angeles, California	Active	
Zeta-Pi	1948–1987, 1989–1995, 2005–2008	San Diego State University	San Diego, California	Inactive	
**Zeta-Omicron**	1948–1965, 1985	University of Oregon	Eugene, Oregon	Active	
Zeta-Mu	1949–1965, 1969–2006	University of New Mexico	Albuquerque, New Mexico	Inactive	(Note: The university banned the chapter from campus after rape allegations.)
**Zeta-Tau**	1949–2008, 2016	Stetson University	DeLand, Florida	Active	(Note: Chapter formed from Sigma Omega, established in 1947.)
Zeta-Eta	1949–2002	University of California, Santa Barbara	Goleta, California	Inactive	(Note: Chapter formed from Lambda Chi Club, established in 1947.)
**Zeta-Theta**	1949–1998, 200x ?	University of Memphis	Memphis, Tennessee	Active	(Note: Chapter formed from Delta Sigma Chi, established in 1945.)
**Zeta-Upsilon**	1950–2003, 2008	Miami University	Oxford, Ohio	Active	(Note: Chapter formed from Alpha Gamma Pi, established in 1947.)
Zeta-Xi	1950–1962	University of British Columbia	Vancouver, British Columbia, Canada	Inactive	
Zeta-Chi	1950–1960	Norwich University	Northfield, Vermont	Inactive	(Note: Chapter formed from Chi Alpha Chi, established in 1948.)
**Zeta-Omega**	1950–1997, 1998	Mercer University	Macon, Georgia	Active	
Zeta-Kappa	1950–1962, 1982–1989	University of Utah	Salt Lake City, Utah	Inactive	
Zeta-Nu	1950–1970	San Jose State College	San Jose, California	Inactive	(Note: Chapter formed from Pi Beta Sigma, established in 1947.)
**Zeta-Rho**	1950–2011	Florida State University	Tallahassee, Florida	Associate chapter	
**Zeta-Psi**	1951–2003, 2010	Arizona State University	Tempe, Arizona	Active	
Iota-Alpha	1951–2004, 2010-2025	Ball State University	Muncie, Indiana	Inactive	(Note: Chapter formed from the Navajo Club, established in 1919.)
**Iota-Gamma**	1952–2003, 2012	California State University, Fresno	Fresno, California	Active	
**Iota-Epsilon**	1952–2002, 2014	Indiana State University	Terre Haute, Indiana	Active	(Note: Chapter formed from Delta Lambda Sigma, established in 1923.)
**Iota-Zeta**	1952–2011, 2018	University of North Texas	Denton, Texas	Active	(Note: Chapter formed from Beta Alpha Rho, established in 1933.)
Iota-Iota	1950–2011	McGill University	Montreal, Quebec, Canada	Inactive	
**Iota-Lambda**	1953–1976, 2017	West Virginia University	Morgantown, West Virginia	Active	
Iota-Beta	1953–2025	Lycoming College	Williamsport, Pennsylvania	Inactive	(Note: Chapter formed from Lambda Phi Delta, established in 1948.)
**Iota-Sigma**	1954–1998, 2005	Valparaiso University	Valparaiso, Indiana	Active	(Note: Chapter formed from Rho Lambda Tau, established in 1946.)
Iota-Phi	1954–2012, 2026	High Point University	High Point, North Carolina	Inactive	(Note: Chapter formed from Delta Alpha Epsilon, established in 1928.)
Iota-Delta	1954–2020	University of Nebraska Omaha	Omaha, Nebraska	Inactive	(Note: Chapter formed from Sigma Lambda Beta, established in 1949.)
**Iota-Pi**	1956	Texas Christian University	Ft. Worth, Texas	Active	
Iota-Omicron	1956–1984, 1987–2015	East Tennessee State University	Johnson City, Tennessee	Inactive	(Note: Chapter formed from Phi Beta Chi, established in 1946. It was suspended in 2015 for five years.)
**Iota-Mu**	1956	University of Evansville	Evansville, Indiana	Active	(Note: Chapter formed from Phi Zeta, established in 1869.)
Iota-Tau	1957–1959, 1975–1986	University of Houston	Houston, Texas	Inactive	(Note: Chapter formed from Tau Kappa Sigma, established in 1946.)
Iota-Eta	1957–1993	Susquehanna University	Selinsgrove, Pennsylvania	Inactive	(Note: Chapter formed from Bond & Key Club, established in 1914.)
**Iota-Theta**	1959	Arkansas State University	Jonesboro, Arkansas	Active	(Note: Chapter formed from the Veterans Club, established in 1956.)
**Iota-Upsilon**	1959–2010, 2019	East Carolina University	Greenville, North Carolina	Active	(Note: Chapter formed from Delta Sigma Rho, established in 1956.)
**Iota-Xi**	1960–1992, 1997–2006, 2023	West Texas A&M University	Canyon, Texas	Active	(Note: Chapter formed from Lambda Pi Delta, established in 1958.)
**Iota-Chi**	1962–1995, 2001	University of Iowa	Iowa City, Iowa	Active	(Note: Chapter formed from Lambda Chi Club, established in 1957.)
**Iota-Omega**	1962	University of Louisiana at Lafayette	Lafayette, Louisiana	Active	(Note: Chapter formed from Alpha Chi, established in 1961.)
Iota-Kappa	1962–1991	East Texas State University	Commerce, Texas	Inactive	(Note: Chapter formed from the Artema Club, established in 1935.)
**Iota-Nu**	1963	Sewanee: The University of the South	Sewanee, Tennessee	Active	(Note: Chapter formed from Upsilon Sigma, established in 1961.)
Iota-Rho	1963–1973	Parsons College	Fairfield, Iowa	Inactive	(Note: Chapter formed from Phi Delta Omega, established in 1960.) (Note: Parsons College closed in 1973, which led to the demise of the chapter.)
**Iota-Psi**	1963	Ferris State University	Big Rapids, Michigan	Active	(Note: Chapter formed from Delta Tau Epsilon, established in 1955.)
**Lambda-Alpha**	1964	University of New Orleans	New Orleans, Louisiana	Active	(Note: Chapter formed from Delta Chi Omega, established in 1959.)
Lambda-Gamma	1964–2000	Commonwealth University-Lock Haven	Lock Haven, Pennsylvania	Inactive	
**Lambda-Epsilon**	1964	Kettering University	Flint, Michigan	Active	(Note: Chapter formed from Gilgal, established in 1928.)
**Lambda-Zeta**	1964	Union University	Jackson, Tennessee	Active	(Note: Chapter formed from Lambda Xi Delta, established in 1961.)
**Lambda-Iota**	1965–2005, 2013	University of Wisconsin–Whitewater	Whitewater, Wisconsin	Active	(Note: Chapter formed as Beta Kappa Nu (local) fraternity in 1929. It became the Beta chapter of Chi Delta Rho fraternity in 1939, but reorganized as Chi Delta Rho (local) after World War II. It chartered as the Chi Delta chapter of Delta Kappa in 1952 but disaffiliated in 1961 and became the local Chi Delta Rho again, before finally chartering into Lambda Chi Alpha four years later, in 1965.)
**Lambda-Lambda**	1965	Western Kentucky University	Bowling Green, Kentucky	Active	(Note: Chapter formed from Pi Lambda Alpha, established in 1958.)
**Lambda-Beta**	1965	University of Delaware	Newark, Delaware	Active	(Note: Chapter formed from Gamma Nu, established in 1963.)
Lambda-Sigma	1966–1973	Franciscan University of Steubenville	Steubenville, Ohio	Inactive	
**Lambda-Phi**	1966–2011	Texas State University	San Marcos, Texas	Associate chapter	(Note: Chapter formed from Kappa Sigma Alpha, established in 1962.)
**Lambda-Delta**	1966–1980, 1991	Minnesota State University, Mankato	Mankato, Minnesota	Active	(Note: Chapter formed from Beta Delta Tau, established in 1962.)
Lambda-Pi	1967–202x ?	University of Central Missouri	Warrensburg, Missouri	Inactive	(Note: Chapter formed from Alpha Chi Epsilon, established in 1963.)
Lambda-Omicron	1968–1974	Eastern Washington University	Cheney, Washington	Inactive	
Lambda-Mu	1968–2006	University of South Florida	Tampa, Florida	Inactive	(Note: Chapter formed from Kappa Iota Omega, established as Cieo in 1961 before changing its name in 1964. The fraternity revoked the chapter's charter in 2006 for hazing and alcohol violations.)
**Lambda-Tau**	1968–1995, 200x ?	Western Michigan University	Kalamazoo, Michigan	Active	
**Lambda-Eta**	1968	Murray State University	Murray, Kentucky	Active	(Note: Chapter formed from Tau Beta Chi, established in 1965.)
**Lambda-Theta**	1968–2006, 2016	South Dakota State University	Brookings, South Dakota	Active	
Lambda-Upsilon	1968–2011	Northern Michigan University	Marquette, Michigan	Inactive	(Note: Chapter formed from Alpha Delta Epsilon, established in 1965.)
Lambda-Xi	1968–1991	Slippery Rock University	Slippery Rock, Pennsylvania	Inactive	(Note: Chapter formed from Chi Alpha Club, established in 1966.)
**Lambda-Chi**	1969	Pittsburg State University	Pittsburg, Kansas	Active	(Note: Chapter formed from Beta Chi, established in 1965.)
**Lambda-Omega**	1970–2011, 2024	Central Michigan University	Mt. Pleasant, Michigan	Active	
Lambda-Kappa	1970–1980	West Chester State College	West Chester, Pennsylvania	Inactive	
Lambda-Nu	1970–1972	University of Windsor	Windsor, Ontario, Canada	Inactive	
Lambda-Rho	1970–1985	California State University, Los Angeles	Los Angeles, California	Inactive	(Note: Chapter formed from Kappa Chi, established in 1966.)
Lambda-Psi	1970–1985	West Liberty State College	West Liberty, West Virginia	Inactive	(Note: Chapter formed from Sigma Beta Chi, established in 1935.)
**Beta-Alpha**	1970	Angelo State University	San Angelo, Texas	Active	(Note: Chapter formed from Kappa Xi, established in 1966.)
Beta-Gamma	1970–1994	Indiana University of Pennsylvania	Indiana, Pennsylvania	Inactive	(Note: Chapter formed from Delta Gamma Nu, established in 1966.)
Beta-Epsilon	1970–2017	Texas A&M University–Kingsville	Kingsville, Texas	Inactive	(Note: Chapter formed from Delta Epsilon Gamma, established in 1967.)
**Beta-Zeta**	1970–200x ?; 200x ?	Western Carolina University	Cullowhee, North Carolina	Active	(Note: Chapter formed from Sigma Tau Sigma, established in 1968.)
**Beta-Iota**	1971–2000, 2011	Villanova University	Villanova, Pennsylvania	Active	(Note: Chapter formed from Iota Delta Nu, established in 1969.)
Beta-Lambda	1971–2006	Morehead State University	Morehead, Kentucky	Inactive	(Note: Chapter formed from Tau Alpha Epsilon, established in 1964.)
Beta-Beta	1971–2000	Glenville State College	Glenville, West Virginia	Inactive	(Note: Chapter formed from Omega Kappa Phi, established in 1968.)
Beta-Sigma	1971–1977	Lamar University	Beaumont, Texas	Inactive	(Note: Chapter formed from Zeta Chi Delta, established in 1967.)
Beta-Phi	1971–1976	Florida Atlantic University	Boca Raton, Florida	Inactive	(Note: Chapter formed from Pi Kappa Sigma, established in 1969.)
**Beta-Delta**	1971–2001, 2008	Pennsylvania Western University, Edinboro	Edinboro, Pennsylvania	Active	(Note: Chapter formed from Lambda Chi, established in 1966.)
Beta-Pi	1971–1972	Point Park University	Pittsburgh, Pennsylvania	Inactive	(Note: Chapter formed from Tau Theta Phi, established in 1960.)
**Beta-Omicron**	1971–2011; March 20, 2023	Illinois State University	Normal, Illinois	Active	(Note: Chapter formed from Lambda Chi Lambda, established in 1969.)
Beta-Mu	1971–1990	Tennessee Tech	Cookeville, Tennessee	Inactive	(Note: Chapter formed from the Gallon Club, established in 1960.)
Beta-Tau	1971–1998	Western Illinois University	Macomb, Illinois	Inactive	(Note: Chapter formed from Pi Gamma Psi, established in 1968.)
Beta-Eta	1971–2015	University of Central Florida	Orlando, Florida	Inactive	(Note: Chapter formed from Chi Alpha Fraternity, established in 1968.)
Beta-Theta	1972–1985	Missouri Western State University	St. Joseph, Missouri	Inactive	(Note: Chapter formed from Delta Nu, established in 1967.)
**Beta-Upsilon**	1972–xxxx ?	University of North Carolina at Charlotte	Charlotte, North Carolina	Associate chapter	(Note: Chapter formed from Theta Psi, established in 1970.) (Note: 2024 Colony)
Beta-Xi	1972–1990; May 6, 2017 – 2020	Bloomsburg University of Pennsylvania	Bloomsburg, Pennsylvania	Inactive	(Note: Chapter formed from Pi Epsilon Chi, established in 1967.)
Beta-Chi	1972–200x ?	Widener University	Chester, Pennsylvania	Inactive	(Note: Chapter formed from Lambda Tau Rho, established in 1969.)
Beta-Omega	1972–1999, 2000–2003	Commonwealth University-Mansfield	Mansfield, Pennsylvania	Inactive	(Note: Chapter formed from Iota Eta Sigma, established in 1969.)
**Beta-Kappa**	1942–2019, 2024	Georgia Tech	Atlanta, Georgia	Active	(Note: Chapter formed from the former Alpha Gamma chapter of Beta Kappa, established in 1927.)
**Beta-Nu**	1972	Florida Institute of Technology	Melbourne, Florida	Active	(Note: Chapter formed from Epsilon Kappa Delta Society, established in 1968.)
**Beta-Rho**	1972–1998, 200x ?	California State University, Northridge	Northridge, Los Angeles, California	Active	
**Beta-Psi**	1972–2003, 2016	Missouri State University	Springfield, Missouri	Active	(Note: Chapter formed from Alpha Lambda Chi, established in 1970.)
Sigma-Alpha	1972–1995	Vincennes University	Vincennes, Indiana	Inactive	(Note: Chapter formed from Theta Psi Omega, established in 1967.)
**Sigma-Gamma**	1972–1977, 1979	Kutztown University of Pennsylvania	Kutztown, Pennsylvania	Active	(Note: Chapter formed from Delta Sigma Delta, established in 1969.)
Sigma-Epsilon	1972–2024	University of Montevallo	Montevallo, Alabama	Inactive	(Note: Chapter formed from Chi Alpha Tau, established in 1968.)
Sigma-Zeta	1973–2003	Texas Wesleyan University	Ft. Worth, Texas	Inactive	(Note: Chapter formed from Altoco Fraternity (local), established in 1934.)
Sigma-Iota	1973–2017	Old Dominion University	Norfolk, Virginia	Inactive	(Note: Chapter formed from Lambda Chi, established in 1969.)
**Sigma-Lambda**	1973–2017, 2021	Virginia Tech	Blacksburg, Virginia	Active	(Note: Chapter formed from Sigma Omega Tau, established in 1958.)
**Sigma-Beta**	1973	St. Mary's University, Texas	San Antonio, Texas	Active	(Note: Chapter formed from Kappa Sigma Nu, established in 1968.)
Sigma-Sigma	1974–1990	Georgia Southwestern State University	Americus, Georgia	Inactive	
**Sigma-Phi**	1974	Embry–Riddle Aeronautical University, Daytona Beach	Daytona Beach, Florida	Active	(Note: This chapter originated as the Epsilon Rho chapter of Alpha Eta Rho professional aviation fraternity in April of 1965. It withdrew and petitioned to join ΛΧΑ, colonizing in 1971.)
Sigma-Delta	1974–1981	University of North Alabama	Florence, Alabama	Inactive	
Sigma-Pi	1974–1980	Dallas Baptist University	Dallas, Texas	Inactive	
Sigma-Omicron	1974–1990	Stephen F. Austin State University	Nacogdoches, Texas	Inactive	(Note: Chapter formed from Kappa Sigma Alpha, established in 1969.)
Sigma-Mu	1975–1985, 2005–2015	Sam Houston State University	Huntsville, Texas	Inactive	
**Sigma-Tau**	1975	Troy University	Troy, Alabama	Active	
Sigma-Eta	1975–2003	University of Dayton	Dayton, Ohio	Inactive	(Note: Chapter formed from Epsilon Sigma Phi, established in 1964.)
**Sigma-Theta**	1975–1991, 2014	Methodist University	Fayetteville, North Carolina	Active	
**Sigma-Upsilon**	1975–2011, 2018	Appalachian State University	Boone, North Carolina	Active	(Note: Chapter formed from the Collegiate Civic Club, established in 1958.)
Sigma-Xi	1975–2001	Southern Polytechnic State University	Marietta, Georgia	Inactive	(Note: Chapter formed from Alpha Beta Sigma, established in 1959.)
Sigma-Chi	1975–2023	University of Alabama at Birmingham	Birmingham, Alabama	Inactive	
**Sigma-Omega**	1976–1989, 2001–	University of Northern Colorado	Greeley, Colorado	Active	
Sigma-Kappa	1976–2009	Eastern Michigan University	Ypsilanti, Michigan	Inactive	
**Sigma-Nu**	1976–2000, 2014	Texas Tech University	Lubbock, Texas	Active	
Sigma-Rho	1976–2015	University of Missouri–Kansas City	Kansas City, Missouri	Inactive	
Sigma-Psi	1976–1993, 1998–2015	Baylor University	Waco, Texas	Inactive	(Note: Chapter formed from Lambda Chi Delta, established in 1974.)
**Phi-Alpha**	1977	Eastern Illinois University	Charleston, Illinois	Active	
Phi-Gamma	1977–1982	University of South Alabama	Mobile, Alabama	Inactive	
Phi-Epsilon	1957–2006	California State University, Fullerton	Fullerton, California	Inactive	
Phi-Zeta	1977–2006	Arkansas Tech University	Russellville, Arkansas	Inactive	(Note: Chapter formed from Phi Kappa Alpha, established in 1975.)
**Phi-Iota**	1977	Shepherd University	Shepherdstown, West Virginia	Active	(Note: Chapter formed from Psi Lambda Chi, established in 1969.)
**Phi-Lambda**	1978	Saint Joseph's University	Philadelphia, Pennsylvania	Active	
**Phi-Beta**	1978	Eastern Kentucky University	Richmond, Kentucky	Active	
**Phi-Sigma**	1979	California Polytechnic State University, San Luis Obispo	San Luis Obispo, California	Active	
**Phi-Phi**	1980	Michigan Technological University	Houghton, Michigan	Active	
**Phi-Delta**	1980	University of Maryland, Baltimore County	Baltimore, Maryland	Active	
Phi-Pi	1980–2009	California State University, Sacramento	Sacramento, California	Inactive	
Phi-Omicron	1981–2003	Northern Illinois University	DeKalb, Illinois	Inactive	
Phi-Mu	1982	Bowling Green State University	Bowling Green, Ohio	Inactive	
Phi-Tau	1982–2007, 2016–2022	Shippensburg University of Pennsylvania	Shippensburg, Pennsylvania	Inactive	
**Phi-Eta**	1982–1997, Spring 2009	James Madison University	Harrisonburg, Virginia	Active	(Note: In 1997, the chapter's charter was suspended for alcohol violations.)
**Phi-Theta**	1983	University of North Carolina at Greensboro	Greensboro, North Carolina	Active	
**Phi-Upsilon**	1983	University of Texas at San Antonio	San Antonio, Texas	Active	
**Phi-Xi**	1984	University of Southern Indiana	Evansville, Indiana	Active	
**Phi-Chi**	1984–2003, 2016	California State University, Chico	Chico, California	Active	(Note: Chapter formed from Pi Kappa, established in 1982. After going dormant, it reformed in 2016 from Omicron Alpha Pi in 2013.)
Phi-Omega	1984–1995, 2000–2014	Towson University	Towson, Maryland	Inactive	(Note: Chapter formed from Alpha Kappa Epsilon, established in 1982. It was suspended from 2014 until 2019.)
Phi-Kappa	1984–202x ?	Auburn University at Montgomery	Montgomery, Alabama	Inactive	
Phi-Nu	1985–1998	Adams State College	Alamosa, Colorado	Inactive	
**Phi-Rho**	1986	Tarleton State University	Stephenville, Texas	Active	
**Phi-Psi**	1986	Truman State University	Kirksville, Missouri	Active	
Delta-Alpha	1987–2006	University of North Florida	Jacksonville, Florida	Inactive	
**Delta-Gamma**	1987–1996, 2002	University of California, Davis	Davis, California	Active	
Delta-Epsilon	1987–1995	Georgia State University	Atlanta, Georgia	Inactive	
Delta-Zeta	1988–1993	University of Calgary	Calgary, Alberta, Canada	Inactive	
Delta-Iota	1988–1995	University of South Carolina Upstate	Valley Falls, South Carolina	Inactive	
Delta-Lambda	1990–202x ?	University of Nevada, Las Vegas	Las Vegas, Nevada	Inactive	
Delta-Beta	1991–2018	Northeastern State University	Tahlequah, Oklahoma	Inactive	
**Delta-Sigma**	1991–1998, 2013	University of North Carolina Wilmington	Wilmington, North Carolina	Active	(Note: Chapter formed from Sigma Kappa Tau, established in 1986.)
**Delta-Phi**	1991	Southeast Missouri State University	Cape Girardeau, Missouri	Active	
**Delta-Delta**	1991	Spring Hill College	Mobile, Alabama	Active	
**Delta-Pi**	1992–2001, 2005	Elon University	Elon, North Carolina	Active	
Delta-Omicron	1992–2007	Clemson University	Clemson, South Carolina	Inactive	
**Delta-Mu**	1992–2012, 2022	Texas A&M University	College Station, Texas	Active	
**Delta-Tau**	1993	Millersville University of Pennsylvania	Millersville, Pennsylvania	Active	
**Delta-Eta**	1993	University of Western Ontario	London, Ontario, Canada	Active	
Delta-Theta	1995–2006	Grand Valley State University	Allendale, Michigan	Inactive	(Note: Chapter formed from Lambda Chi Delta, established in 1990.)
Delta-Upsilon	1995–2009	Jacksonville University	Jacksonville, Florida	Inactive	
Delta-Xi	1995–2019	George Washington University	Washington, D.C.	Inactive	
Delta-Chi	1995–1998	Southern Illinois University Carbondale	Carbondale, Illinois	Inactive	(Note: Chapter formed from Lambda Chi Delta, established in 1993.)
Delta-Omega	1997–2019	Colorado State University Pueblo	Pueblo, Colorado	Inactive	
Delta-Kappa	1998–2019	University of San Diego	San Diego, California	Inactive	
Delta-Nu	1999–2011	University of California, Riverside	Riverside, California	Inactive	
**Delta-Rho**	2001	University of Wyoming	Laramie, Wyoming	Active	
**Delta-Psi**	2003	Loyola Marymount University	Los Angeles, California	Active	
**Pi-Alpha**	2004	University of South Carolina Aiken	Aiken, South Carolina	Active	(Note: Chapter formed from Pi Kappa Psi, established in 2001.)
Pi-Gamma	2004–2021	Kent State University	Kent, Ohio	Inactive	
Pi-Epsilon	2005–202x ?	University of the Incarnate Word	San Antonio, Texas	Inactive	
Pi-Zeta	2005–2025	Elmhurst University	Elmhurst, Illinois	Inactive	
Pi-Iota	2004–2009	North Carolina A&T State University	Greensboro, North Carolina	Inactive	
**Pi-Lambda**	2005	University of Health Sciences and Pharmacy in St. Louis	St. Louis, Missouri	Active	
**Pi-Beta**	2005	University of California, San Diego	La Jolla, California	Active	
Pi-Sigma	2005–202x ?	Southeastern Oklahoma State University	Durant, Oklahoma	Inactive	
Pi-Phi	2007–202x ?	Florida International University	Miami, Florida	Inactive	
**Pi Delta**	2008	Wilmington College	Wilmington, Ohio	Active	
Pi-Pi	2010–20xx ?	Lake Forest College	Lake Forest, Illinois	Inactive	
Pi-Omicron	2013–2022	American University	Washington, D.C.	Inactive	
**Pi-Mu**	2014	South Dakota School of Mines and Technology	Rapid City, South Dakota	Active	
Pi-Tau	2014–2022	Virginia Commonwealth University	Richmond, Virginia	Inactive	
Pi-Eta	2014–202x ?	John Carroll University	University Heights, Ohio	Inactive	
**Pi-Theta**	2012	Wichita State University	Wichita, Kansas	Active	
Pi-Upsilon	2016–202x ?	Johnson & Wales University	Charlotte, North Carolina	Inactive	
Pi-Xi	2016–202x ?	Embry–Riddle Aeronautical University, Prescott	Prescott, Arizona	Inactive	
**Pi-Chi**	2016	Huntingdon College	Montgomery, Alabama	Active	
**Pi-Omega**	2018	University of Tampa	Tampa, Florida	Active	
Pi-Kappa	2018–2020	Coastal Carolina University	Conway, South Carolina	Inactive	
**Pi-Nu**	2019	Johnson & Wales University	Providence, Rhode Island	Active	
**Pi-Rho**	2019	University at Buffalo	Buffalo, New York	Active	
Pi-Psi	2019–2022	University of Wisconsin–La Crosse	La Crosse, Wisconsin	Inactive	
**Pi-Rho**	2019	University at Buffalo	Buffalo, New York	Active	
**Omicron-Alpha**	2020	Flagler College	St. Augustine, Florida	Active	
Omicron-Gamma	2020–2022	Middle Tennessee State University	Murfreesboro, Tennessee	Inactive	
