= Paul C. Saville =

American businessman

Paul C. Saville (born 1956) is an American businessman who serves as President and CEO of NVR, Inc.

== Education ==
In 1977 he received a Bachelor of Arts degree in business administration (BBA) from the College of William and Mary. He received a master of business administration (MBA) from the University of Pittsburgh.

== Career ==
After receiving his M.B.A. from the University of Pittsburgh, Saville joined Rockwell International in their Automotive Operations. In 1989, Saville joined Ryan Homes, predecessor of NVR, working in various financial positions within the company. His backgrounds in finance and strategic planning/oversight prepared him to serve as Vice President of Business Planning, then CFO and effectively chief operating officer. He advanced within the company and in 2005 was appointed to his current position as President and CEO.

Saville earned more than $30 million in 2010 and owns about 300,000 shares of NVR stock. He has a net worth of $230 million.

On August 8, 2019, Saville traded 20,000 units of NVR stock worth more than $14,060,000. As of 7 May 2022, he has been trading around 1,349 units every 41 days since 2002.
