= Zane Birdwell =

American audio producer and sound designer

Zane Birdwell is a Grammy-winning American audio producer, sound designer, and composer, originally from Chattanooga, Tennessee, and later based in New York City.

== Career ==
Birdwell has worked as a sound designer and engineer for New World Stages, Ars Nova, and stageFARM. He currently works at the Naked Angels theater company.

At the 52nd Annual Grammy Awards (2010), Birdwell was awarded a Grammy Award for Best Spoken Word Album for his engineering work on the audiobook edition of Michael J. Fox's memoir Always Looking Up. Birdwell has also engineered audiobooks for Paul Shaffer, Patti Lupone, Taya Kyle, and Wally Lamb.

Birdwell has written music for Disney, HarperCollins, Macmillan Education, Mango Languages, and Creative Teaching Press. He released the original album World Class People in 2010, and a compilation of previous works in film, television, and theater called Translations in 2012.
