= Robert B. Goergen =

American businessman

Robert Blyth Goergen. Sr.
- Born: 1938; New York, US
- Spouse: Pamela Goergen
- Children: 2

Robert B. Goergen is a corporate executive, entrepreneur and philanthropist. He is the founder, chairman and CEO of Blyth, Inc. He is also the founder and chairman of The Ropart Group, a private-equity investment firm. Goergen was a member of the Forbes 400 for a number of years in 1990s, but was later surpassed by other Americans. Goergen earned a bachelor's degree in physics from the University of Rochester in 1960, where he was also initiated into the Beta Phi chapter of Delta Kappa Epsilon. He also holds an M.B.A. from the Wharton School at the University of Pennsylvania. He began his career at Procter & Gamble before moving onto other firms, including McCann-Erickson, McKinsey & Co. and the venture capital group at Donaldson, Lufkin & Jenrette. Goergen's philanthropy efforts are prolific, including several large donations to the University of Rochester, where the main athletics center and joint biomedical engineering and optics building bear his name, and to the University of Pennsylvania Wharton School, with an endowment for a faculty chair and an entrepreneurial management program.

== Early life and education ==
Goergen was born in a suburb of Buffalo, New York, in 1938. After securing a scholarship to the University of Rochester, Goergen intended to be a physicist. After taking a summer job researching the field of airborne radioactivity, Goergen realized he wanted to change his career path. He applied to the Wharton School of the University of Pennsylvania to receive his MBA, graduating in 1962.

== Career ==
After serving in the Army Reserve, Goergen joined The McCann-Erickson advertising agency. In 1967, Goergen left McCann-Erickson and joined McKinsey & Co where he made partner in four years. After working at McKinsey, Goergen decided to make yet another career change and at age 35, Goergen joined Donaldson, Lufkin & Jenrette, eventually becoming the managing director of their venture cap arm. In 1979, while still at DLJ, Goergen, his attorney, and two other investors each invested $25,000 in a Brooklyn-based candle company. As CEO, Goergen expanded the business, adding new product lines and acquiring other home accessories companies. In 1994, Goergen took the business public as Blyth, Inc.

In 1996, the company emerged as the largest home accessories and candle company in the world. Ten years later, in 2006, Blyth, Inc. earned $1.6 billion in revenue.

Goergen is also the founder and chairman of The Ropart Group, a private-equity investment firm.

== Charitable giving ==
Goergen is an American philanthropist. He started the Goergen Foundation in 1986 in Greenwich, Connecticut. This foundation predominately gives to the arts, education, environmental, medical and youth organizations.

=== University of Rochester ===
Throughout his life, Goergen has made numerous donations to the school. One of his most notable gifts was a $10.5 million grant to the university's undergraduate program accompanied with a $100,000 gift every year for five years. In 2015, Goergen and his wife, Pamela, committed $11 million to the Rochester Institute for Data Science. The institute is named the Goergen Institute for Data Science in his honor. Goergen gave $5 million to the Rochester athletic facility, now named the Robert B. Goergen Athletic Facility. Goergen has served on the board of directors of the university since 1982 and served as the chairman from 1992 to 2003. Due to the support of Goergen, the university is able to award three professors every year with the Goergen Awards in the Arts, Sciences and Engineering.

=== University of Pennsylvania ===
Goergen has been a donor to the University of Pennsylvania throughout his life and has made numerous donations. In 1998, Goergen gave $10 million to the University of Pennsylvania in order to create the Goergen Entrepreneurial Management Program. Every year, more than 2,000 students participate in this program making it one of the largest and most diverse programs of its kind. Also, Goergen created the Robert B. Goergen Professorship of Entrepreneurial Management demonstrating once again his commitment to assisting the next generation of entrepreneurs. In 2011, Goergen was awarded Wharton's highest honor, the Dean's Medal. Goergen serves as an honorary chair of the Wharton Entrepreneurship Board.

=== Other donations ===
Goergen is a patron of the arts and education. Goergen has served on the board of trustees of many museums including the Hirshhorn Museum and Sculpture Garden and the Whitney Museum of American Art. He is also a member of the National Gallery of Art Collectors Committee in Washington, D.C. He has given grants to Princeton University, Grace Church School, Northwestern University, Choate Rosemary Hall, Wake Forest University, the Norton Museum of Art, the New York Botanical Garden, and many more.
