= Lambda Chi Alpha =

North American collegiate fraternity

- ΛΧΑ
- Founded: November 2, 1909; 116 years ago Boston University
- Type: Social
- Affiliation: NIC
- Status: Active
- Scope: International
- Motto: Vir Quisque Vir "Every Man a Man"
- Pillars: Loyalty, Duty, Respect, Service & Stewardship, Honor, Integrity, Personal Courage
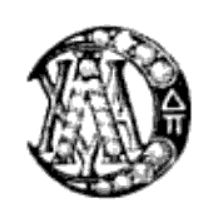
- Member badge
- Colors: Royal Purple, Kelly Green, and Old Gold
- Symbol: Cross and Crescent
- Flag
- Flower: White Rose
- Mascot: Lion rampant
- Publication: Cross and Crescent, Paedagogus, and Purple, Green and Gold
- Philanthropy: Feeding America, Movember, The Jed Foundation and American Red Cross
- Chapters: 185 active, 322 chartered
- Members: 8,600+ active 300,000+ lifetime
- Nicknames: Lambda Chis, Lambda, LCA, LXA, Chops/Choppers
- Headquarters: 10 W. Carmel Drive, Suite 220; Carmel, Indiana 46032; United States
- Website: lambdachi.org

Lambda Chi Alpha (ΛΧΑ), commonly referred to as Lambda Chi, is a collegiate fraternity in North America. With over 300,000 initiates as of 2024, it is the third-largest social fraternity in the world by number of initiates. It has almost 8,700 current undergraduate members affiliated with chapters and associate chapters at 166 colleges and universities in the United States and Canada. Its members may be known variously as Lambda Chis, LXAs, LCAs, Lambdas, or Choppers at different campuses.

Lambda Chi Alpha was founded at Boston University in 1909. It is a member of the North American Interfraternity Conference (NIC), which it rejoined in November 2023 after withdrawing from the conference in 2015. Among the largest 15 social fraternities in the world, Lambda Chi Alpha is the youngest. Since 2014, after maintaining its headquarters at various locations in Indiana, Massachusetts, and Pennsylvania, it has been headquartered in Carmel, Indiana, outside Indianapolis.

== History ==
=== Founding ===
Lambda Chi Alpha was founded by Warren A. Cole, a law student at Boston University School of Law in Boston. There are two different accounts of the fraternity's founding.

The official story told by Cole and Albert Cross is that on November 2, 1909, Cole, Percival C. Morse, and Clyde K. Nichols reorganized the Cosmopolitan Law Club, a society of Boston University law students into the Loyal Collegiate Associates, which was renamed Lambda Chi Alpha in 1912. All were close friends and had been members of Alpha Mu Chi, a prep school fraternity. The Greek letter name is thought to have been used from the beginning but is not recorded in the Alpha Zeta minutes until April 27, 1910.

A second account of the founding, based on interviews with contemporaries, is that Cole and others did belong to a loose group known as the Tombs or Cosmopolitan Club but this was not related to Lambda Chi Alpha's founding. Instead, according to the alternative account, Cole shared an apartment with James C. McDonald and Charles W. Proctor, who later joined Sigma Alpha Epsilon. Cole then established his own fraternity with Ralph S. Miles, Harold W. Bridge, and Percival C. Morse on November 23, 1911. The group issued a charter for itself that was backdated to November 15.

Cole approached many local groups at colleges and universities throughout the Northeast seeking others willing to join his new fraternity. He corresponded with or visited 117 institutions by 1912, when a group at Massachusetts Agricultural College accepted a charter to become Gamma Zeta. The first General Assembly, establishing a structure for the national fraternity, was held in Boston on April 13, 1912.

The fraternity held its second general assembly in Boston on March 22, 1913 in which the fraternity adopted its secret motto, ritual insignia including its badge and coat of arms, and the basic organizational structure. Lambda Chi Alpha virtually replaced the fraternity Cole had established outside of its name. The 14th General Assembly, in 1931, recognized March 22 as Lambda Chi Alpha Day in recognition of these achievements. In 1942, the board of directors renamed it Founder's Day. November 2, 1909 is also still recognized, so Lambda Chi Alpha celebrates two Founders Days annually.

In the years that followed, a divide opened between Cole and a group of young alumni led by Mason, Ernst J.C. Fischer of Lambda Chi's Cornell University chapter in Ithaca, New York, and Samuel Dyer of the University of Maine chapter in Orono, Maine. Dyer was supported by Albert Cross at the University of Pennsylvania chapter in Philadelphia and Louis Robbins of the Brown University chapter in Providence, Rhode Island. In 1920, Cole was ousted and Fischer was elected national president. In 1927, Fischer became international president when Epsilon-Epsilon Zeta at the University of Toronto in Toronto was chartered.

=== Theta Kappa Nu merger ===
The Theta Kappa Nu fraternity was formed by eleven local fraternities on June 9, 1924, in Springfield, Missouri. With the help of the North American Interfraternity Conference in identifying local groups, and Theta Kappa Nu's policy of granting charters quickly to organizations with good academic standards, the fraternity grew quickly and had approximately 2,500 initiates in 40 chapters by the end of 1926.

During the Great Depression, both Theta Kappa Nu and Lambda Chi Alpha saw membership decrease and chapters shut down. In 1939, the two fraternities agreed to merge. The merger ceremony was held at Howard College (now Samford University) chapter of Theta Kappa Nu in Birmingham, Alabama. The merger immediately increased the number of chapters from 77 to 105 (or 78 to 106) and the number of members from 20,000 to 27,000. At the time, this was the largest merger in fraternity history. All Theta Kappa Nu chapters became Lambda Chi Alpha chapters and were given chapter designations that began with either Theta, Kappa, or Nu. At schools where chapters of both fraternities previously existed, the two merged and retained Lambda Chi's Zeta recognition.

=== Headquarters locations ===
Lambda Chi Alpha was founded in Boston, Massachusetts, in 1909. For the first decade of its existence, the fraternity lacked a central office and records were divided between the homes of Grand High Alpha Warren A. Cole in Swansea, Massachusetts and Registrar Samuel Dyer in Attleboro, Massachusetts. In 1920, the fraternity moved its headquarters to Northeastern Pennsylvania, where it was located in Kingston and Wilkes Barre. Later that year, it relocated to Indianapolis, where many other fraternity and sorority national headquarters are located. Since 2021, its headquarters has been based in Carmel, Indiana, outside Indianapolis. Its former headquarters include:

- 1909: Swansea, Massachusetts and Attleboro, Massachusetts
- 1920: 261 Pierce Street, Kingston, Pennsylvania, 18704
- 1920: 160 South Main Street, Wilkes-Barre, Pennsylvania 18701
- 1920: 30-40 North Pennsylvania Street, Indianapolis, Indiana 46205
- 1923: 136 East Market Street, Indianapolis, Indiana 46204
- 1930: 55 Monument Circle, Indianapolis, Indiana 46204
- 1940: Rhodes, Mansion, 2029 North Meridian Street, Indianapolis, Indiana 46202
- 1955: 3434 North Washington Boulevard, Indianapolis, Indiana 46205
- 1974: 8741 Founders Road, Indianapolis, Indiana 46268
- 2014: 11711 North Pennsylvania Street, Suite 250, Carmel, Indiana 46032
- 2021: 10 W Carmel Drive, Suite 220, Carmel, Indiana 46032

=== North American Interfraternity Conference ===
The fraternity first joined the North American Interfraternity Conference (NIC) in 1913. In October 2015, it resigned from the association, citing in-fighting and dysfunctional governance. The fraternity's exit coincided with NIC lobbying for the Safe Campus Act, which was opposed by both the fraternity and sexual assault advocacy groups. Lambda Chi Alpha re-joined the NIC in November 2023.

== Symbols ==
The colors of Lambda Chi Alpha are royal purple, kelly green, and old gold. Its symbols are the cross and crescent. Its flower is the white rose and its mascot is the lion rampant. Its motto is Vir Quisque Vir or "Every Man a Man." The fraternity's core values or pillars are Loyalty, Duty, Respect, Service & Stewardship, Honor, Integrity, Personal Courage.

== Membership ==
Beginning in August 1969, the concept of fraternity education replaced pledge education at Lambda Chi Alpha. The fraternity education program was designed to integrate all new members into the chapter equally.

In 1972, Lambda Chi Alpha officially abolished the pledge process and replaced it with associate membership. Associate members in Lambda Chi Alpha to this day have all of the same rights as initiated brothers, can hold officer positions, wear the letters, and can vote on all issues except for those involving Lambda Chi's initiation ritual. Status as an associate member permits new members to enter the fraternity with respect, and helps to combat the issues that arise from the possible abuse of pledges. Lambda Chi Alpha was the first fraternal organization to abolish pledging.

== Philanthropy ==
From 1993 to 2012, Lambda Chi Alpha's philanthropy was the North American Food Drive (NAFD). As of 2010, NAFD had collected around 33 million pounds of food for food banks. In 2012, NAFD was discontinued under that name and rolled into an ongoing partnership with Feeding America.

In 2017, Lambda Chi Alpha announced a trial partnership with the St. Baldrick's Foundation, a Monrovia, California-based organization that funds childhood cancer research. Chapters were encouraged to host or participate in head-shaving events to raise money for the foundation.

In 2019, Lambda Chi Alpha announced a partnership with The Jed Foundation, a Boston-based non-profit organization that seeks to protect emotional health and prevent suicide for teens and young adults. Together, they are launching Lambda Chi Alpha Lifeline, an online mental health resource center tailored from the foundation's ULifeline website, which provides college students with information about emotional health issues and specific resources available to them on their respective campuses. It also offers a confidential mental health self-screening tool.

In 2020, Lambda Chi Alpha announced its partnership with Movember, an Australia-based non-profit foundation that raises awareness of men's health issues such as prostate cancer, testicular cancer, and men's suicide. Movember has recently become a primary philanthropic focus for Lambda Chi Alpha and the fraternity's national administrative office.

In 2023, Lambda Chi Alpha announced its partnership with American Red Cross, a nonprofit humanitarian organization that provides emergency assistance, disaster relief, and disaster preparedness education in the United States. Lambda Chi Alpha is the first and only fraternity with a partnership with The American Red Cross.

== Chapters ==
As of 2024, Lambda Chi Alpha reported 185 active chapters and associate chapters, representing universities in most U.S. states and three Canadian provinces.

=== Chapter naming ===
Lambda Chi Alpha is atypical in its naming scheme. Unlike most fraternities, the order in which chapters are named is not strictly based on the Greek alphabet. Instead, Lambda Chi Alpha chapters are known as Zetas. As such, for instance, the Alpha-Beta chapter is designated Alpha-Beta Zeta. In addition, since the fraternity's founding, Cole assigned Greek letters to petitioning groups that had not yet been chartered. Not all of these groups were chartered, however. As a result, the first 22 chapters were designated Α, Γ, Ε, Ζ, Ι, Λ, Β, Σ, Φ, Δ, Π, Ο, Μ, Τ, Η, Θ, Υ, Ξ, Χ, Ω, Κ, Ν, Ρ, Ψ. After the 24th chapter, the sequence was continued with a prefix following the same sequence (Α-Α, Α-Γ, Α-Ε, ... Γ-Α, Γ-Γ, Γ-Ε, ... Ε-A, etc.)

When Theta Kappa Nu merged with Lambda Chi Alpha in 1939, the former Theta Kappa Nu chapters were each given chapter designations prefixed with Θ, Κ, or Ν. The second letter of their chapter name was assigned in the order mentioned above and applied to the chapters in order of their precedence in Theta Kappa Nu. On campuses with chapters of both Lambda Chi Alpha and Theta Kappa Nu, the chapter of Lambda Chi Alpha kept its original designation.

A singular exception was the chapter at Georgia Tech in Atlanta, Β-Κ Zeta, which was named in recognition of its existence as a chapter of the Beta Kappa, a national fraternity whose other existing chapters merged with Theta Chi in 1942.

== Notable members ==
Lambda Chi Alpha has over 300,000 members.

In 1945, Harry S. Truman, the 33rd president of the United States, was made an honorary initiate of the Lambda Chi Alpha chapter at the University of Missouri.

== In popular culture ==
Lambda Chi Alpha is referenced in the 2005 Kenny Chesney song "Keg in the Closet", which includes the lyrics: "This ol' guitar taught me how to score, right there on that Lambda Chi porch, Mary Ann taught me a little more, about wanting what you can't have." Chesney is a Lambda Chi brother from the Iota-Omicron chapter at East Tennessee State University.

In 2023, the University of New Orleans chapter was featured in Season Seven, Episode 1 of the Netflix series, Queer Eye.

=== Smoot ===
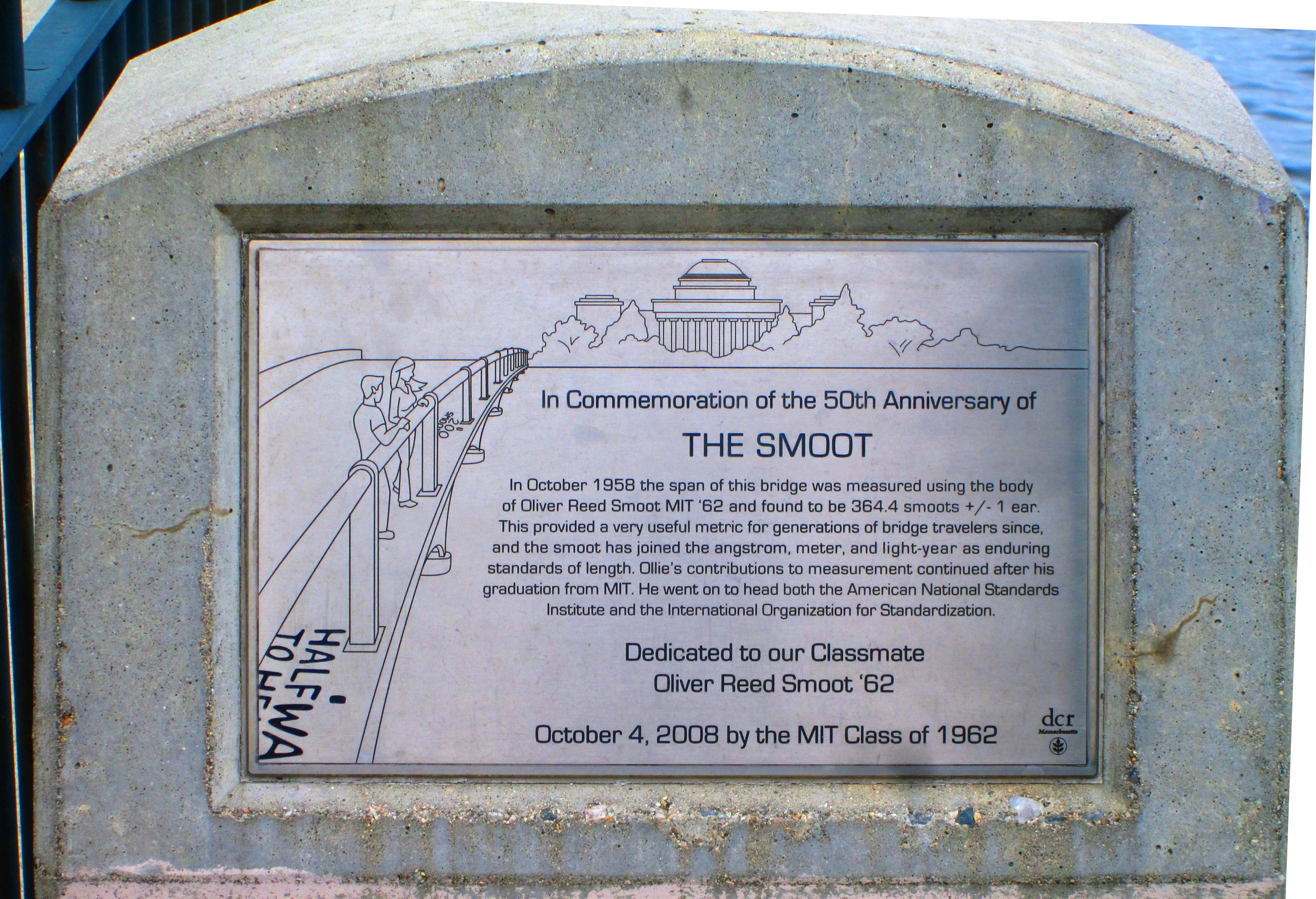
The plaque on Harvard Bridge in Cambridge, Massachusetts documenting the smoot

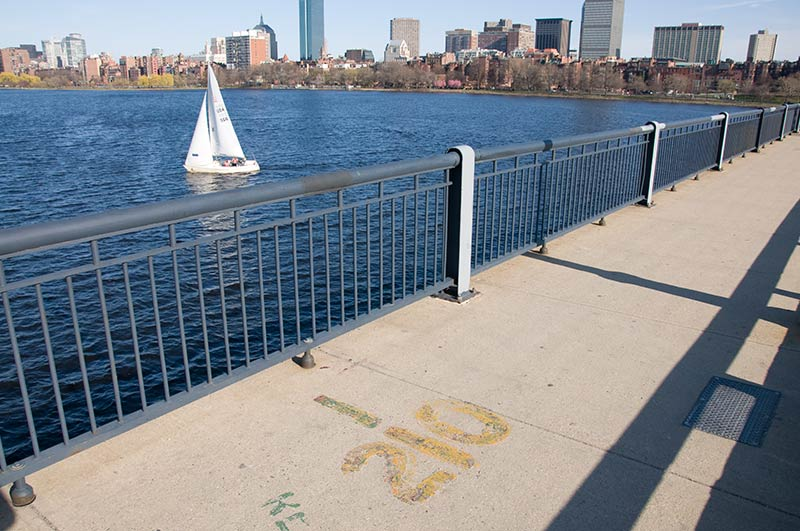
The smoot mark on Harvard Bridge in Cambridge, Massachusetts

In October 1958, a Lambda Chi pledge at MIT, Oliver R. Smoot, gained global recognition when his MIT fraternity brothers had him lay down repeatedly on Harvard Bridge between Boston and Cambridge while they measured the bridge using his height, which turned out to be 5 feet 7 inches. Smoot's height was defined as one "smoot", and Harvard Bridge was officially measured as 364.4 smoots (2,035 ft; 620.1 m) smoots long. The measurement is commemorated with a plaque on Harvard Bridge describing the incident.

In 2009, in remembrance and celebration of the legacy of Smoot, the Pennsylvania Western University, Edinboro chapter contributed to funding the construction of a pickleball facility in collaboration with the university. The addition comprised a total square smootage of 46,735.8 square smoots (1,456,923.65 sq ft).

In 2011, the word "smoot" and its definition were added to the fifth edition of the American Heritage Dictionary.

== Controversies and allegations of misconduct ==
=== 20th century ===
In October 1958, the fraternity expelled its Hamilton College chapter in Clinton, New York, for insisting on a non-discrimination policy for admitting members. The national fraternity insisted that its members be Christians who were either White or Native American. The expelled chapter reorganized as an independent society called Gryphon, which continued to operate for more than two decades.

In May 1988, James Callahan, an associate at Rutgers University in New Brunswick, New Jersey, died of an alcohol overdose from a Lambda Chi Alpha drinking hazing ritual. Fifteen members of the chapter were indicted for his death.

=== 21st century ===
In March 2007, Remy Okonkwo, a member at Georgetown College in Georgetown, Kentucky, was found hanging in the Lambda Chi house on campus. The coroner ruled his death a suicide but his family alleged foul play was involved.

In January 2011, the chapter at Florida State University in Tallahassee, Florida was suspended after a sorority member was shot and killed inside the fraternity house by a Lambda Chi brother who was dating her identical twin sister. The shooter claimed it was an accident.

In May 2014, following a yearlong investigation, seven members at the University of Illinois Urbana-Champaign were arrested and charged with using and distributing illegal drugs. Police found MDMA pills, 40 grams of MDMA powder, cocaine residue, Adderall pills, suspected LSD, cannabis, a large tank of nitrous oxide, and drug paraphernalia in the fraternity house. As a place to purchase drugs, the fraternity had reportedly gained the nickname "the candy shop", according to The News-Gazette.

In March 2016, the chapter at Southern Methodist University in University Park, Texas was placed on a five-year suspension for hazing and code of conduct violations. In 2009 the fraternity had been disciplined but not suspended for similar infractions, which led to the expulsion of 35 out of its at the time 92 members.

In May 2016, the fraternity's national office suspended the chapter at the University of Oregon in Eugene, Oregon after a photo of a Lambda Chi Alpha cooler decorated with the phrase, "Do you wanna do some blow man?" went viral on the Internet. The cooler was discovered along with a half-mile wide swath of trash left behind at Shasta Lake in Northern California, where an estimated 1,000 students from multiple universities including the University of Oregon had docked houseboats over the weekend for an unofficial intercollegiate event that continues to happen annually.

In August 2016, Colson Machlitt, a football player at Georgetown College in Georgetown, Kentucky, died after allegedly jumping down a flight of stairs at the fraternity. Alcohol was suspected to be involved in his death.

In January 2017, the Indiana University-Bloomington chapter in Bloomington, Indiana, was placed under a two-year suspension after an associate member reported hazing activities occurring in the chapter house to the university, which allegedly included brutal physical exercise, liquor hazing, and the act of capping were mentioned in the report. In response, the fraternity's national office removed over 100 members, who were able to fully recolonize in fall 2021.

In April 2018, the chapter at Cal Poly SLO in San Luis Obispo, California was placed on interim suspension after social media images surfaced depicting members dressed up as gang members with one wearing blackface during the school's multicultural celebration weekend.

In August 2018, the chapter at Butler University in Indianapolis was suspended by the school, which did not cite a specific reason for the suspension. The Indianapolis Star reported that alcohol violations played a part. The university said it would not consider reinstating the chapter until 2021. Following the suspension, a woman filed a civil rights complaint against the university, saying that it grossly mishandled her allegation that she was raped by a member of the fraternity during a fraternity party. The fraternity member had previously been accused of sexual misconduct by another student.

In September 2020, the University of Georgia chapter in Athens, Georgia, was suspended after racist and other insensitive text messages between members were exposed by a fellow student on Twitter.

In January 2024, the West Virginia University chapter in Morgantown, West Virginia was placed on an interim suspension following allegations of permitting and facilitating underage alcohol consumption.

== See also ==
- List of Lambda Chi Alpha brothers
- List of Lambda Chi Alpha chapters
