= Blyth, Inc. =

Personal goods manufacturing company

Coordinates: 41.01674°N 73.64890°W

Blyth Incorporated
- Type: Private
- Industry: Home accessories
- Founded: 1976
- Headquarters: Greenwich, Connecticut, U.S.
- Key people: Robert B. Goergen Sr. (Founder, Chairman and CEO)
- Revenue: ▲US$ 1.179 billion (2012)
- Operating income: ▲US$ 84.566 million (2012)
- Net income: ▼US$ 10.046 million (2012)
- Total assets: ▼US$ 321.604 million (2012)
- Total equity: ▼US$ 58.804 million (2012)
- Owner: Carlyle Group
- Number of employees: 1,700 (Dec 2012)
- Website: www.blyth.com

Blyth, Inc. is a Greenwich, Connecticut based marketing and manufacturing company that sells personal and decorative products. In 2001, it was the largest candlemaker in the United States. Subsidiaries include the multi-level marketing companies PartyLite and Visalus.

== History ==
On May 13, 2002, Blyth announced that it has acquired all of the membership interest in CBK, Ltd., LLC, a designer and marketer of giftware and home decor, sold under the CBK brand. Blyth purchased the interests in CBK for total cash consideration of approximately $49.5 million. Midwest CBK was sold to MVP Group International in 2011. CBK was to remain obligated on its indebtedness, including approximately $4.8 million of long-term debt.

In 2012 Blyth sold the brand Sterno, which it had acquired in 1997.

In 2015, Blyth was acquired by the private equity firm Carlyle Group. Subsidiary Silver Star Brands was sold to Crosby Rock, leaving Blyth with PartyLite.

== ViSalus ==
In 2008 Blyth began a multi-stage takeover of ViSalus, a multi-level marketing company which sells nutritional supplements and energy drinks. In the first stage of the takeover Blyth purchased a 43.6% equity interest for $14.0 million. In 2011 Blyth invested an additional $2.5 million and increased their ownership share to 57.5%.

By August 2012 Blyth owned a 73% share of Visalus and planned a spin off of the company in an initial public offering. In September 2012, Moody's Investors Service downgraded Blyth's credit from "stable" to "negative," Blyth stated that ViSalus's growth was not properly valued, and Blyth withdrew the IPO citing uncertain market conditions.

In September 2014, ViSalus' founders and select stockholders arranged to buy back control of the company from Blyth. Blyth remained an equity holder with 10% of ViSalus's stock. The transaction eliminated Blyth's obligation to pay the co-founders $143.2 million as part of the 2008 acquisition. At the time of the transaction, ViSalus' earnings and revenue had declined from a high-point in 2012, and the company had been operating at a loss for 2013 and the first two quarters of 2014.
