= All-time rosters by defunct NFL franchises (Akron Indians/Pros–Cleveland Indians/Bulldogs) =

This is a list of players who have appeared in at least one regular season or postseason game for defunct National Football League (NFL) or All-America Football Conference (AAFC) franchises. This list contains franchises sorted alphabetically from "Akron Indians/Pros" to "Dayton Triangles". For the rest of the franchises, see all-time rosters by defunct NFL franchises (Cleveland Tigers/Indians–Miami Seahawks) and (Milwaukee Badgers–Washington Senators).

== Akron Indians/Pros ==
- Dunc Annan
- Frank Bacon
- Russ Bailey
- John Barrett
- Marty Beck
- George Berry
- Scotty Bierce
- Frank Bissell
- Russ Blailock
- Wayne Brenkert
- Brooke Brewer
- George Brown
- Matt Brown
- Sol Butler
- Carl Cardarelli
- Alvro Casey
- Knute Cauldwell
- Ralph Chase
- Chase Clements
- Alf Cobb
- Tuffy Conn
- Marty Conrad
- Charlie Copley
- Bunny Corcoran
- Carl Cramer
- Ken Crawford
- Red Daum
- Bill Edgar
- Guil Falcon
- Jim Flower
- Budge Garrett
- Hal Griggs
- Bruno Haas
- Art Haley
- Isham Hardy
- Harry Harris
- Dutch Hendrian
- Fritz Henry
- Paul Hogan
- Frank Hogue
- Tom Holleran
- Pike Johnson
- Al Jolley
- Marshall Jones
- Rip King
- Walt Kreinheder
- Walt LeJeune
- Joe Little Twig
- Grover Malone
- Leo McCausland
- Nat McCombs
- Frank McCormick
- Al Michaels
- Buck Miles
- Joe Mills
- Stan Mills
- Frank Moran
- Bob Nash
- Ray Neal
- Al Nesser
- Harry Newman
- Obie Newman
- Fanny Niehaus
- Al Pierotti
- Fritz Pollard
- Bill Preston
- Roy Ratekin
- Jack Read
- Red Roberts
- James Robertson
- Paul Robeson
- George Rohleder
- Ed Sauer
- Les Scott
- Walt Sechrist
- Red Seidelson
- Ed Shaw
- Paul Sheeks
- Dutch Speck
- Bob Spiers
- Hugh Sprinkle
- Dick Stahlman
- Cliff Steele
- Charlie Stewart
- Fred Sweetland
- Elgie Tobin
- Leo Tobin
- Tommy Tomlin
- Rube Ursella
- Tillie Voss
- Dutch Wallace
- Hal Wendler
- Milt Wilson
- Giff Zimmerman

== Baltimore Colts (1947–1950) ==
- Lee Artoe
- Dick Barwegan
- Ernie Blandin
- Hardy Brown
- George Buksar
- Jim Castiglia
- Rip Collins
- Ken Cooper
- Andy Dudish
- Barry French
- Dub Garrett
- Rex Grossman
- George Hekkers
- Chick Jagade
- Jon Jenkins
- Bob Jensen
- Ralph Jones
- Ed King
- Veto Kissell
- Floyd Konetsky
- Augie Lio
- Bob Livingstone
- Chick Maggioli
- John Mellus
- Bus Mertes
- Chet Mutryn
- Robert Nelson
- Steve Nemeth
- John North
- Bob Nowaskey
- Bob Oristaglio
- Charlie O'Rourke
- Bob Perina
- Ollie Poole
- Ralph Ruthstrom
- Paul Salata
- Bud Schwenk
- Alex Sidorik
- Jack Simmons
- Frankie Sinkwich
- Jim Spavital
- Billy Stone
- Y. A. Tittle
- Buzz Trebotich
- Joel Williams
- George Zorich
- Sisto Averno
- George Blanda
- Adrian Burk
- Leon Campbell
- Don Colo
- Harold Crisler
- Art Donovan
- Frank Filchock
- Arthur Fletcher
- Geno Mazzanti
- Earl Murray
- Jim Owens
- Herb Rich
- John Schweder
- Frank Spaniel
- Art Spinney
- Ernie Zalejski
- Bill Baumgartner
- Hub Bechtol
- Pete Berezney
- Warren Beson
- J. T. "Blondy" Black
- Lamar Blount
- Ernie Case
- Herb Coleman
- Bert Corley
- Bob Cowan
- Armand Cure
- Lamar Davis
- Spiro Dellerba
- Aubrey Fowler
- John Galvin
- Lu Gambino
- Gorham Getchell
- Ed Grain
- George Groves
- Dick Handley
- Luke Higgins
- Billy Hillenbrand
- Mike Kasap
- Bob Kelly
- Wayne Kingery
- Al Klug
- Joe Kodba
- Jim Landrigan
- Jake Leicht
- Bill Leonard
- Elmer Madar
- Vic Marino
- Lew Mayne
- Len McCormick
- Gil Meyer
- Rudy Mobley
- Paul Page
- George Perpich
- Bob Pfohl
- Mike Phillips
- Felto Prewitt
- Sig Sigurdson
- Joe Smith
- Jim Spruill
- Ralph Stewart
- John Sylvester
- Ray Terrell
- Pete Tillman
- Sam Vacanti
- Johnny Vardian
- Herman Wedemeyer
- Windell Williams
- John Wright
- Frank Yokas

== Boston Yanks ==
- Lou Abbruzzi
- Art Albrecht
- Bill Anderson
- John Badaczewski
- Fritz Barzilauskas
- Stan Batinski
- George Cafego
- Ralph Calcagni
- Rocco Canale
- Bill Chipley
- Bill Collins
- Vince Commisa
- Milt Crain
- Harold Crisler
- Joe Crowley
- Don Currivan
- Boley Dancewicz
- Bob Davis (born 1914)
- Bob Davis (born 1927)
- Tom Dean
- Don Deeks
- Al Dekdebrun
- Babe Dimancheff
- George Doherty
- Joe Domnanovich
- Walt Dubzinski
- Paul Duhart
- Don Eliason
- Tony Falkenstein
- Gary Famiglietti
- Al Fiorentino
- Ed Fiorentino
- Ed Franco
- Frank Gaziano
- Wimpy Giddens
- Jim Gillette
- Bill Godwin
- Joe Golding
- Sam Goldman
- Paul Governali
- John Grigas
- Scott Gudmundson
- Dick Harrison
- Robert Hazelhurst
- Ralph Heywood
- Joe Hoague
- Mike Jarmoluk
- Ellis Jones
- Rubin Juster
- Abe Karnofsky
- Bill Kennedy
- Ed Korisky
- Andy Kowalski
- Gene Lee
- Tony Leon
- Augie Lio
- Bob Long
- Jim Magee
- Howard Maley
- Gene Malinowski
- Vaughn Mancha
- Pug Manders
- Lou Mark
- Frank Martin
- Johnny Martin
- Bob Masterson
- Ned Mathews
- Frank Maznicki
- Bob McClure
- Hugh McCullough
- Ed McGee
- Bob McRoberts
- Jim Mello
- Mike Micka
- John Morelli
- Frank Muehlheuser
- Frank Nelson
- John Nolan
- Ace Parker
- Bill Paschal
- Win Pedersen
- John Poto
- Steve Pritko
- Keith Ranspot
- Freeman Rexer
- Floyd Rhea
- Thron Riggs
- Tom Rodgers
- George Roman
- Rudy Romboli
- Dave Ryan
- Joe Sabasteanski
- Frank Sachse
- Jack Sachse
- Paul Sanders
- Frank Santora
- Nick Scollard
- Frank Seno
- George Sergienko
- Alex Sidorik
- Steve Sierocinski
- Phil Slosburg
- George Smith
- David Smukler
- Leo Stasica
- Ken Steinmetz
- Steve Sucic
- Joe Sulaitis
- George Sullivan
- Morgan Tiller
- Frank Turbert
- Jim Tyree
- Carroll Vogelaar
- Bill Walker
- Joe Watt
- Ted Williams
- Walt Williams
- Gordon Wilson
- Jim Wright
- Harry Wynne
- Jim Youel
- Joe Zeno
- Roy Zimmerman

== Brooklyn Lions ==
- Herm Bagby
- Hugh Blacklock
- James Bond
- Matt Brennan
- Earl Britton
- Dutch Connor
- Leo Douglass
- Ted Drews
- Art Garvey
- Ed Harrison
- Red Howard
- Paul Jappe
- Steve Kobolinski
- Al Leith
- Dick McGrath
- Bob Morris
- Tommy Myers
- Swede Nordstrom
- Ted Plumridge
- Ed Reagen
- Owen Reynolds
- Quentin Reynolds
- Bill Rooney
- James Sheldon
- George Snell
- Bill Stephens
- Art Stevenson
- Harry Stuhldreher
- Tarzan Taylor
- Rex Thomas
- Chief Toorock
- Charlie Weber
- Jim Yeager
- Dave Ziff

== Brooklyn Dodgers/Tigers ==
- Frank Abruzzino
- Tony Aiello
- Vannie Albanese
- Warren Alfson
- John Ambrose
- Sig Andrusking
- Marger Apsit
- David Ariail
- Bill Armstrong
- Jim Austin
- Red Badgro
- Bill Bailey
- John Bandura
- Jeff Barrett
- Wayland Becker
- Gil Bergerson
- Johnny Biancone
- Mal Bleecker
- Jim Bowdoin
- Verdi Boyer
- Eddie Britt
- Chuck Brodnicki
- Bill Brown
- Boyd Brumbaugh
- Carl Brumbaugh
- Art Bultman
- John Bunyan
- Sherrill Busby
- Wendell Butcher
- Johnny Butler
- George Cafego
- Chris Cagle
- Ray Carnelly
- Joe Carter
- Dick Cassiano
- Les Caywood
- George Chalmers
- Algy Clark
- Ed Comstock
- Merl Condit
- Red Conkright
- Dave Cook
- Ty Coon
- Norm Cooper
- Gerry Courtney
- Dick Crayne
- Win Croft
- Jerry Cronin
- Doc Cronkhite
- Bernie Crowl
- Frank Cumiskey
- Ernest Cuneo
- Ave Daniell
- Bill Davis
- George Demas
- Art Deremer
- Leo Disend
- George Doherty
- Ben Douglas
- Tommy Dowler
- Johnny Druze
- Alex Eagle
- Jess Eberdt
- Marshall Edwards
- Don Eliason
- John Ellis
- Harold Ely
- Ox Emerson
- Paul Engebretsen
- Tony Falkenstein
- Scrapper Farrell
- Jake Fawcett
- Beattie Feathers
- Walt Fedora
- Dick Fishel
- Bill Fleckenstein
- Dick Folk
- Sam Francis
- Red Franklin
- Ray Frick
- Benny Friedman
- Andy Fronczek
- Kenny Fryer
- Ted Fulton
- Ray Fuqua
- Art Garvey
- Fred Getz
- Bob Gifford
- Bob Gillson
- Ed Goddard
- John Golemgeske
- Lou Gordon
- George Grandinette
- Ben Greenberg
- Donn Greenshields
- Jack Grossman
- Mike Gussie
- Al Gutknecht
- Ace Gutowsky
- Bob Haak
- Swede Hagberg
- Horse Hagerty
- Hoot Haines
- Buck Halperin
- Swede Hanson
- Ray Hare
- Pat Harrison
- Jim Hartman
- Henry Hayduk
- Red Heater
- Ralph Heikkinen
- Ken Heineman
- Carl Heldt
- Herman Hickman
- Harold Hill
- Herman Hodges
- Jay Hornbeak
- Bud Hubbard
- Joe Hugret
- Paul Humphrey
- Roy Ilowit
- Len Janiak
- Billy Jefferson
- Bob Jeffries
- Art Jocher
- Bert Johnson
- Cecil Johnson
- Al Jolley
- Marvin Jonas
- Bruce Jones
- Lew Jones
- Thurmon Jones
- Wagner Jorgensen
- Mike Jurich
- Bernie Kapitansky
- Carl Kaplanoff
- John Karcis
- Tony Kaska
- Duce Keahey
- Bill Kelly
- Shipwreck Kelly
- Matt Kelsh
- Ralph Kercheval
- Bruiser Kinard
- George Kinard
- Fred King
- B'Ho Kirkland
- Frank Kirkleski
- Ben Kish
- Harry Kloppenberg
- Joe Koons
- Stan Kosel
- Stan Kostka
- Andy Kowalski
- George Kracum
- Henry Krause
- Frank Kristufek
- Bill LaFitte
- Les Lane
- Bill Leckonby
- Bill Lee
- Rube Leisk
- George Lenc
- Tony Leon
- Edson Lott
- Lou Lubratovich
- Father Lumpkin
- Babe Lyon
- John Lyons
- Bob Mahan
- Pug Manders
- Joe Maniaci
- Tillie Manton
- Jodie Marek
- Lou Mark
- Steve Marko
- Frank Martin
- Bob Masterson
- John Matisi
- Dean McAdams
- Jack McArthur
- Jack McBride
- Hal McCullough
- Flip McDonald
- Walt McDonald
- Banks McFadden
- Charlie McGibbony
- John McMichaels
- Frank McNeil
- Curt Mecham
- Ed Merlin
- Walt Merrill
- Saul Mielziner
- Jim Miller
- Buster Mitchell
- Warner Mizell
- Cliff Montgomery
- Jim Mooney
- Tex Mooney
- Gene Moore
- Doc Morrison
- Dave Myers
- Dick Nardi
- Tom Nash
- Don Nelson
- Jerry Nemecek
- Dick Nesbitt
- Mike Nixon
- John Norby
- Reino Nori
- Ray Novotny
- Len Noyes
- Dick O'Donnell
- John Oehler
- Pete Owens
- Ace Parker
- Dave Parker
- Larry Peace
- Claude Perry
- Frosty Peters
- Les Peterson
- Phil Peterson
- Steve Petro
- Don Pierce
- Earl Plank
- Ken Radick
- Norbert Raemer
- Bill Raffel
- Keith Ranspot
- Leo Raskowski
- Joe Ratica
- Van Rayburn
- Ray Reckmack
- Bill Reissig
- Bill Reynolds
- Floyd Rhea
- Hugh Rhea
- Paul Riblett
- Dick Richards
- Bobby Robertson
- Tom Robertson
- Jack Robinson
- Ev Rowan
- Ed Rucinski
- Justin Rukas
- Frank Sachse
- Sandy Sandberg
- Ollie Sansen
- Tony Sarausky
- Phil Sarboe
- Johnny Scalzi
- Skippy Scheib
- Herm Schmarr
- Jim Schuber
- Perry Schwartz
- Bill Senn
- George Sergienko
- Joe Setcavage
- Alec Shellogg
- Rhoten Shetley
- Tony Siano
- Jim Sivell
- Ed Skoronski
- George Smith
- Leo Stasica
- Sammy Stein
- Vaughn Stewart
- Frank Stojack
- Hal Stotsbery
- Mike Stramiello
- Frank Strom
- Bud Svendsen
- Phil Swiadon
- Chuck Taylor
- Mark Temple
- Rex Thomas
- Stumpy Thomason
- Si Titus
- Joe Tofil
- Johnny Tomaini
- Bud Toscani
- John Tosi
- Bob Trocolor
- Rocky Uguccioni
- Joe Vance
- Jack Vetter
- Ray Wagner
- Bill Waller
- Charlie Ware
- Gordon Watkins
- George Webb
- George Weeks
- Ray Wehba
- Chuck Weimer
- Bernie Weiner
- Don Wemple
- Jim Whatley
- Wilbur White
- Ossie Wiberg
- Cy Williams
- Pop Williams
- Bob Wilson
- Gordon Wilson
- Bob Winslow
- Stu Worden
- Ralph Wright
- Ted Wright
- Izzy Yablock
- John Yezerski
- Waddy Young
- Frank Zadworney
- Gust Zarnas

== Brooklyn Dodgers (AAFC) ==
- O'Neal Adams
- Al Akins
- Carl Allen
- Charlie Armstrong
- George Benson
- George Bernhardt
- John Billman
- Hardy Brown
- Harry Buffington
- Harry Burrus
- Jim Camp
- Bob Chappuis
- Johnny Clowes
- Mickey Colmer
- Mel Conger
- Harry Connolly
- Jim Cooper
- Bill Daley
- Lou Daukas
- Nick Daukas
- Joe Davis
- Jim Dewar
- Glenn Dobbs
- Dan Edwards
- Hank Foldberg
- Nick Forkovitch
- Jack Freeman
- Monk Gafford
- Joe Gibson
- Ed Gustafson
- Amos Harris
- Elmore Harris
- Bob Hein
- Robert Hoernschemeyer
- Frank Hrabetin
- Charlie Huneke
- Ed Jeffers
- Billy Jones
- Dub Jones
- Saxon Judd
- John Klasnic
- Al Kowalski
- Francis Laurinaitis
- Bob Leonetti
- Herb Maack
- Hugo Marcolini
- Phil Martinovich
- Lew Mayne
- Bob McCain
- Jim McCarthy
- Walt McDonald
- Ed Mieszkowski
- Tom Mikula
- Max Morris
- Russ Morrow
- Herb Nelson
- Bernie Nygren
- Vic Obeck
- Bob Paffrath
- Mike Patanelli
- Bolo Perdue
- Bob Perina
- George Perpich
- Dom Principe
- Cal Purdin
- Ray Ramsey
- Martin Ruby
- Ralph Sazio
- Leroy Schneider
- Ted Scruggs
- George Sergienko
- Rhoten Shetley
- Bob Smith
- Joe Spencer
- Herb St. John
- George Strohmeyer
- Bob Sullivan
- Doyle Tackett
- Lee Tevis
- Hal Thompson
- Charlie Timmons
- Art Van Tone
- Morrie Warren
- Tex Warrington
- Harlan Wetz
- Garland Williams
- John Wozniak

== Buffalo All-Americans/Bisons/Rangers ==
- Jim Ailinger
- Neely Allison
- Ockie Anderson
- Les Asplundh
- Leonard Bahan
- Ben Barber
- Carl Beck
- John Beckett
- Scotty Bierce
- Herb Bizer
- Karl Bohren
- Benny Boynton
- Bill Brace
- Wes Bradshaw
- Walt Brewster
- Shirley Brick
- Doc Bruder
- Russ Burt
- Pete Calac
- Glenn Carberry
- Ed Carman
- Harlan Carr
- Eddie Casey
- Les Caywood
- Floyd Christman
- Harry Collins
- Ulysses Comier
- Ed Comstock
- Bunny Corcoran
- Frank Culver
- Harry Curzon
- Herb Dieter
- Don Dimmick
- Art Dorfman
- Ed Doyle
- Bill Edgar
- Van Edmondson
- Lou Feist
- Darrell Fisher
- Eddie Fisher
- Jack Flavin
- Andy Fletcher
- Fred Foster
- Wally Foster
- Moose Gardner
- Buck Gavin
- Chet Gay
- Frank Glassman
- Angus Goetz
- Gil Gregory
- Albert Guarnieri
- Roy Guffey
- Mike Gulian
- Charlie Guy
- Milo Gwosden
- Swede Hagberg
- Norm Harvey
- Russ Hathaway
- Ken Hauser
- Andy Hillhouse
- Ben Hobson
- Tommy Holleran
- Steamer Horning
- Iolas Huffman
- Tommy Hughitt
- Barlow Irvin
- Al Jolley
- Ken Jones
- Eddie Kaw
- Tex Kelly
- Jim Kendrick
- Jimmy Kennedy
- Bill Kibler
- George Kirk
- Glenn Knack
- Walter Koppisch
- Babe Kraus
- Waddy Kuehl
- Jim Laird
- Barney Lepper
- Lou Little
- Bob Mahan
- John Mahoney
- Roy Martineau
- Jack McArthur
- Nat McCombs
- Frank McConnell
- Elmer McCormick
- Firpo McGilbra
- Heinie Miller
- Charlie Mills
- Paul Minick
- Al Mitchell
- Frank Morrissey
- Jim Morrow
- Vince Mulvey
- Harry Myles
- Ralph Nairan
- Bob Nash
- George Nix
- Jim Noble
- Jack O'Hearn
- Elmer Oliphant
- Lowell Otte
- Art Peed
- Ralph Pittman
- Earl Plank
- Earl Potteiger
- Roger Powell
- Bob Rapp
- Bob Rawlings
- Max Reed
- Ben Roderick
- Jess Rodriguez
- Stan Rosen
- Spin Roy
- John Rupp
- Cassy Ryan
- Ted Schwarzer
- Johnny Scott
- Murray Shelton
- Red Shurtliffe
- Elmer Slough
- Pat Smith
- George Snell
- Gus Sonnenberg
- Butch Spagna
- Frank Spellacy
- Herb Stein
- Torchy Sullivan
- Al Swain
- Karl Thielscher
- Carl Thomas
- Pinky Thompson
- Tiny Thornhill
- Mike Trainor
- Jack Underwood
- Luke Urban
- Eddie Usher
- Chase Van Dyne
- Charlie Van Horn
- Bill Vaughn
- Norton Vedder
- Doc Voss
- Tillie Voss
- Bill Ward
- Rat Watson
- Len Watters
- Cop Weathers
- Chuck Weimer
- Bodie Weldon
- Red Werder
- Ralph White
- Firpo Wilcox
- Joe Willson
- Jim Wilson
- Mule Wilson
- Jim Woodruff
- Lud Wray
- Swede Youngstrom

== Buffalo Bisons/Bills ==
- Chet Adams
- Al Akins
- Graham Armstrong
- Ed Balatti
- Al Baldwin
- Jack Baldwin
- John Batorski
- J. T. "Blondy" Black
- Lamar Blount
- Sam Brazinsky
- Rex Bumgardner
- Bob Callahan
- Jack Carpenter
- Ollie Cline
- Tommy Colella
- Marty Comer
- Al Coppage
- Bert Corley
- Bill Daddio
- Al Dekdebrun
- George Doherty
- Andy Dudish
- Gil Duggan
- Jack Dugger
- Ray Ebli
- Fred Evans
- John Fekete
- Jesse Freitas
- Abe Gibron
- Paul Gibson
- Bill Gompers
- Chubby Grigg
- George Groves
- Joe Haynes
- Hal Herring
- Buckets Hirsch
- Harry Hopp
- Larry Joe
- Pres Johnston
- Elmer Jones
- Steve Juzwik
- John Kerns
- Ed King
- Fay King
- George Kisiday
- John Kissell
- Veto Kissell
- Quentin Klenk
- Al Klug
- Nick Klutka
- George Koch
- Chet Kozel
- Jack Kramer
- Ray Kuffel
- Vic Kulbitski
- Hal Lahar
- Jim Lecture
- Bob Leonetti
- Bob Livingstone
- Bob Logel
- Jim Lukens
- Chick Maggioli
- Pug Manders
- Patsy Martinelli
- John Maskas
- John Matisi
- Vince Mazza
- Jack Morton
- Chet Mutryn
- Herb Nelson
- Bill O'Connor
- Bob Oristaglio
- John Perko
- Rocco Pirro
- Felto Prewitt
- Ben Pucci
- George Ratterman
- Albie Reisz
- Jules Rykovich
- Curt Sandig
- Ralph Schilling
- Don Schneider
- Bill Schroll
- Carl Schuette
- Vince Scott
- Bob Smith
- C.B. Stanley
- Bill Stanton
- Art Statuto
- Odell Stautzenberger
- Bob Stefik
- Bob Steuber
- Jim Still
- Ken Stofer
- Roy Stuart
- Joe Sutton
- George Terlep
- Jim Thibaut
- Bob Thurbon
- Lou Tomasetti
- Al Vandeweghe
- Vic Vasicek
- Wilbur Volz
- Jerry Whalen
- Gene White
- Alex Wizbicki
- Al Wukits
- John Wyhonic
- Lou Zontini

== Canton Bulldogs ==
- Sam Babcock
- Don Batchelor
- Arda Bowser
- Ray Brenner
- Cub Buck
- Sol Butler
- Pete Calac
- Bird Carroll
- Guy Chamberlin
- John Comer
- Rudy Comstock
- Larry Conover
- Bunny Corcoran
- Frank Culver
- Harrie Dadmun
- Art Deibel
- Cap Edwards
- Doc Elliott
- Guil Falcon
- Al Feeney
- Willie Flattery
- Wilmer Fleming
- Birdie Gardner
- Johnny Gilroy
- Tom Gormley
- Larry Green
- Red Griffiths
- Tex Grigg
- Albert Guarnieri
- Joe Guyon
- Doc Haggerty
- Art Haley
- Russ Hathaway
- Johnny Hendren
- Dutch Hendrian
- Pete Henry
- Bob Higgins
- Paul Hogan
- Ben Jones
- John Kellison
- Herb Kempton
- Jim Kendrick
- Glenn Killinger
- Rip Kyle
- Jim Laird
- Joe Little Twig
- Bull Lowe
- Link Lyman
- Buck MacDonald
- Al Maginnes
- Cliff Marker
- Ike Martin
- Johnny McQuade
- Wade McRoberts
- Ralph Meadow
- Lou Merillat
- Candy Miller
- Jim Morrow
- Vern Mullen
- Joe Murphy
- William Murrah
- Don Nelson
- John Nichols
- Dan O'Connor
- Duke Osborn
- Larry Petty
- Ruel Redinger
- Harry Robb
- Stan Robb
- Guy Roberts
- Wooky Roberts
- Ben Roderick
- Jack Sack
- Norb Sacksteder
- Ed Sauer
- Dick Schuster
- Frank Seeds
- Ben Shaw
- Ed Shaw
- Fritz Slackford
- Marv Smith
- Russ Smith
- Lou Smyth
- Dutch Speck
- Red Steele
- Russ Stein
- Dutch Strassner
- Tarzan Taylor
- Jim Thorpe
- Dick Vick
- Ralph Waldsmith
- Dutch Wallace
- Charley Way
- Belf West
- Tom Whelan
- Inky Williams
- Joe Williams
- Swede Youngstrom
- Harold Zerbe
- Giff Zimmerman

== Chicago Rockets/Hornets ==
- Alex Agase
- Frank Aschenbrenner
- Jim Bailey
- Bill Bass
- Alf Bauman
- George Bernhardt
- Connie Mack Berry
- Angelo Bertelli
- John Billman
- Bill Boedeker
- Hardy Brown
- Jim Brutz
- George Buksar
- Harry Burrus
- Bob Chappuis
- Harry Clarke
- Walt Clay
- Paul Cleary
- Johnny Clement
- Johnny Clowes
- Herb Coleman
- Rip Collins
- Norm Cox
- Ziggy Czarobski
- Bill Daley
- Bob David
- Al Dekdebrun
- John Donaldson
- Bob Dove
- Ray Ebli
- Ed Ecker
- Dan Edwards
- Charlie Elliott
- Fred Evans
- Tom Farris
- Chuck Fenenbock
- Hank Foldberg
- Jesse Freitas
- Don Griffin
- Chubby Grigg
- John Harrington
- Ted Hazelwood
- George Hecht
- Bob Heck
- Ralph Heywood
- Billy Hillenbrand
- Elroy Hirsch
- Robert Hoernschemeyer
- Charlie Huneke
- Bob Jensen
- Farnham Johnson
- Nate Johnson
- Steve Juzwik
- Bill Kellagher
- Fay King
- Quentin Klenk
- Chet Kozel
- Ray Kuffel
- John Kuzman
- Pat Lahey
- Pete Lamana
- Ernie Lewis
- Bob Livingstone
- Ned Mathews
- Fran Mattingly
- Jim McCarthy
- Harley McCollum
- Walt McDonald
- Jim Mello
- Joe Mihal
- Max Morris
- Bob Motl
- Jerry Mulready
- Fred Negus
- Steve Nemeth
- Bruno Niedziela
- Jim O'Neal
- Ike Owens
- Homer Paine
- Mickey Parks
- Paul Patterson
- Jim Pearcy
- Bob Perina
- Roman Piskor
- Dewey Proctor
- Eddie Prokop
- Joe Prokop
- Ben Pucci
- Frank Quillen
- Ray Ramsey
- John Rapacz
- Ray Richeson
- John Rokisky
- Cliff Rothrock
- Joe Ruetz
- Jules Rykovich
- Ted Scalissi
- Bill Schroeder
- Floyd Simmons
- Bill Smith
- Bob Smith
- Joe Soboleski
- Herb St. John
- George Strohmeyer
- Tony Sumpter
- Bob Sweiger
- Gasper Urban
- Emil Uremovich
- Sam Vacanti
- Norm Verry
- Evan Vogds
- Lloyd Wasserbach
- Marty Wendell
- Willie Wilkin
- Walt Williams

== Chicago Tigers ==
- Dunc Annan
- Johnny Barrett
- Sid Bennett
- John Bosdett
- Garland Buckeye
- Ralph Capron
- Ben Derr
- Paul Des Jardien
- Alfred Eissler
- Dick Falcon
- Guil Falcon
- Milt Ghee
- Emmett Keefe
- Oscar Knop
- Grover Malone
- Neil Mathews
- Jack Meagher
- Jock Mungavin
- Dick Pierce
- Lew Reeve
- Frank Rydzewski
- Walter Voight
- Pete Volz

== Cincinnati Celts ==
- Ferris Beekley
- Ken Crawford
- Dane Dastillung
- Fred Day
- Mel Doherty
- Guy Early
- Earl Hauser
- Shiner Knab
- Art Lewis
- Carl Lynch
- Frank McCormick
- Tommy McMahon
- Tom Melvin
- George Munns
- Ohmer
- Henry Orth
- Walt Schupp
- Shriner
- Dave Thompson
- Pete Volz

== Cincinnati Reds ==
- Frank Abruzzino
- Gene Alford
- David Ariail
- Ed Aspatore
- Jim Bausch
- Mil Berner
- Tom Blondin
- Chuck Braidwood
- Lloyd Burdick
- John Burleson
- Thomas Bushby
- Les Caywood
- Algy Clark
- Red Corzine
- Joe Crakes
- Sonny Doell
- Leo Draveling
- Chief Elkins
- Earl Elser
- Tiny Feather
- Rosie Grant
- Homer Hanson
- Hal Hilpirt
- Foster Howell
- Russ Lay
- Biff Lee
- Gil LeFebvre
- Bill Lewis
- Tal Maples
- Jim Mooney
- Cliff Moore
- Don Moses
- Buster Mott
- Lee Mulleneaux
- George Munday
- Mike Palm
- Bill Parriott
- Lew Pope
- Dick Powell
- Fred Ratterman
- John Rogers
- Harvey Sark
- Pete Saumer
- Kermit Schmidt
- Bill Senn
- Benny Sohn
- Seaman Squyres
- Norris Steverson
- Cookie Tackwell
- Otto Vokaty
- Ossie Wiberg
- Basil Wilkerson
- Cole Willging
- Blake Workman
- Charlie Zunker

== Cleveland Indians/Bulldogs ==
- Heartley Anderson
- LeRoy Andrews
- Chalmers Ault
- Carl Bacchus
- Herm Bagby
- Leonard Bahan
- George Baldwin
- Herb Bauer
- Scotty Bierce
- Al Bloodgood
- Arda Bowser
- Phil Branon
- Obie Bristow
- Karl Broadley
- Hal Broda
- Hal Burt
- Glenn Carberry
- Carl Cardarelli
- Les Caywood
- Guy Chamberlin
- Frank Civiletto
- Chase Clements
- Alf Cobb
- Tom Cobb
- Rudy Comstock
- Larry Conover
- Cookie Cunningham
- Herb DeWitz
- Hal Ebersole
- Gus Eckberg
- Deke Edler
- Cap Edwards
- Doc Elliott
- Tiny Feather
- Benny Friedman
- Frank Garden
- Charlie Guy
- Charlie Honaker
- Dosey Howard
- Iolas Huffman
- Ed Johns
- Ben Jones
- Jerry Jones
- Stan Keck
- Frank Kelley
- Walt Kreinheder
- Jerry Krysl
- Rudy Kutler
- Johnny Kyle
- Ed Loucks
- Link Lyman
- Harry McGee
- Bo McMillin
- Russ Meredith
- Al Michaels
- Stan Muirhead
- Lyle Munn
- Truck Myers
- Nick Nardacci
- Al Nesser
- Dave Noble
- Ray Norton
- Duke Osborn
- Bill Owen
- Steve Owen
- Lou Partlow
- Gordon Peery
- Proc Randels
- Milt Rehnquist
- Wooky Roberts
- Doug Roby
- Rudy Rosatti
- Walt Sechrist
- Maury Segal
- Joe Setron
- Jim Simmons
- Clyde Smith
- Olin Smith
- Russ Smith
- Bob Spiers
- Hugh Sprinkle
- Gaylord Stinchcomb
- Gene Stringer
- Paul Suchy
- John Tanner
- Rex Thomas
- Ralph Vince
- Dutch Wallace
- Dutch Webber
- Sol Weinberg
- Ossie Wiberg
- Inky Williams
- Dick Wolf
- Joe Work
- Hoge Workman
- Swede Youngstrom
