= Edler (surname) =

Edler is a surname. Notable people with the surname include:

- Alexander Edler (born 1986), Swedish ice hockey player
- Dave Edler (born 1956), American baseball player and mayor
- Deke Edler (1897–1953), American football player
- Donald K. Edler (1922–1999), American sailor
- Esther Edler (1884–1908), Norwegian actress
- Hans Edler (born 1945), Swedish pop musician and record company manager
- Inge Edler (1911–2001), Swedish cardiologist, medical ultrasonography developer
- Jeff Edler (born 1976), American politician
- Kurt Edler (1950–2021), German politician

== See also ==
- Werner Edler-Muhr (born 1969), Austrian middle-distance runner
