= List of Buffalo Bisons players =

List of Buffalo Bisons players may refer to:

- List of Buffalo Bisons (AAFC) players
- List of Buffalo Bisons (NFL) players
