= Herm Bagby =

American football player (1903–1980)

No. 2
- Position: Back

Personal information
- Born: February 21, 1903; Lake Village, Arkansas, U.S.
- Died: February 29, 1980 (aged 77); Lake Village, Arkansas, U.S.
- Listed height: 5 ft 9 in (1.75 m)
- Listed weight: 175 lb (79 kg)

Career information
- High school: Pine Bluff
- College: Arkansas

Career history
- Brooklyn Lions (1926); Cleveland Bulldogs (1927)

Career statistics
- Games played: 11–12
- Games started: 4
- Touchdowns: 3
- Stats at Pro Football Reference

Herman Carlton Bagby (February 21, 1903 – February 29, 1980) was an American football player who was a back for two seasons in the National Football League (NFL) for the Brooklyn Lions and Cleveland Bulldogs.

== Professional career ==
Bagby was born on February 21, 1903, in Lake Village, Arkansas. He went to Pine Bluff High School before attending the University of Arkansas. He played for their football team, the Razorbacks. He was there from 1922 to '25 before playing professionally. He played on the freshmen team in '22, and with their main team while lettering from '23 to '25. After his college career, he was selected to play for the newly formed Brooklyn Lions of the National Football League (NFL). With the Lions, he played in 8 out of 11 games, starting 4. He played multiple different variations of the back position: tailback, wingback, fullback, and blocking back. He also played defense, scoring a fumble return touchdown and "Pick 6" for 12 points. In week 5, he recovered a fumble in the endzone for his first career score. Only one day later, he returned an interception 95 yards against the Hartford Blues for possibly the longest interception return in history at the time. It was the only Lions score of the game as they lost 16 to 6. He recorded his third and final score against the Canton Bulldogs, on a 12-yard pass from Rex Thomas. In the next season, when the Lions folded, he joined the Cleveland Bulldogs. He had a lesser impact at Cleveland, with only 4 game appearances and no starts. After his professional career he returned to Lake Village. He died there on February 29, 1980, at the age of 77.
