= Joe Work =

American football player (1899–1960)

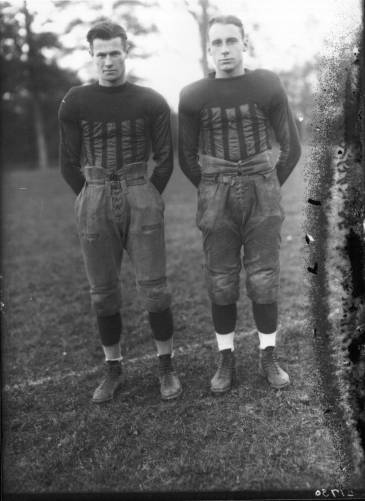
- Work (left) and Bill Lohrman in 1922

No. 6
- Positions: End, wingback

Personal information
- Born: December 31, 1899; Bristol, West Virginia, U.S.
- Died: February 11, 1960 (aged 60); Cincinnati, Ohio, U.S.
- Listed height: 5 ft 10 in (1.78 m)
- Listed weight: 177 lb (80 kg)

Career information
- High school: Homestead (PA)
- College: Miami (OH)

Career history
- Cleveland Indians (1923); Cleveland Bulldogs (1924–1925)
- Stats at Pro Football Reference

Joseph Rankin Work (December 31, 1899 – February 11, 1960) was an American professional football player in the early National Football League (NFL) with the Cleveland Indians and Cleveland Bulldogs. He began his football career playing at the high school level in Homestead, Pennsylvania. He then played at the college level for Miami University. He graduated from Miami in 1923.
