= Eddie Sauer =

American football player (1898–1980)

- Sauer in 1920

Profile
- Position: Lineman

Personal information
- Born: November 27, 1898; Van Buren Township, Ohio, U.S.
- Died: February 15, 1980 (aged 81); Dayton, Ohio, U.S.
- Listed height: 5 ft 10 in (1.78 m)
- Listed weight: 246 lb (112 kg)

Career information
- High school: Steele (Dayton, Ohio)
- College: Miami University

Career history
- Dayton Triangles (1920–1921); Canton Bulldogs (1921); Akron Pros (1922); Dayton Triangles (1922–1925); Pottsville Maroons (1925); Dayton Triangles (1926)

Awards and highlights
- Canton Daily News: 1st team all-NFL (1923)
- Stats at Pro Football Reference

Edward Adam "Tubby" Sauer (November 27, 1898 - February 1980) was a professional football player who played during the early years of the National Football League (NFL).

== Biography ==
A resident of Van Buren Township, Ohio, Sauer attended and played football for nearby Miami University. He made his NFL debut in 1920 with the Dayton Triangles. Sauer also played for the Pottsville Maroons and won the 1925 NFL Championship with the team before the title was stripped from the team due to a disputed rules violation. he also played with the Akron Pros and the Canton Bulldogs of the early league.

Sauer, who stood 5'10" and weighed 240+ pounds, was nicknamed "Tubby". He was the father of John Sauer, a player, coach, and broadcaster.

After his athletic career, Sauer worked in the research department of the General Motors Corporation, for the Ethyl Gasoline Corporation, and as a district manager for the Ohio State Life Insurance Company, for which he was also a director for 32 years.

Sauer retired in 1962.

He died on February 15, 1980, in Dayton, Ohio, at the age of 81.
