= Ed Loucks =

American football player (1896–1959)

Profile
- Position: End

Personal information
- Born: September 15, 1896; Scottdale, Pennsylvania
- Died: September 12, 1959 (aged 62); Canton, Ohio
- Listed height: 5 ft 9 in (1.75 m)
- Listed weight: 180 lb (82 kg)

Career information
- College: Washington & Jefferson

Career history
- Cleveland Bulldogs (1925)
- Stats at Pro Football Reference

Edwin Earl Loucks (September 15, 1896 – September 12, 1959) was a professional football player who spent one season in the National Football League with the Cleveland Bulldogs. He attended Washington & Jefferson College.
