= Milt Crain (fullback) =

American football fullback

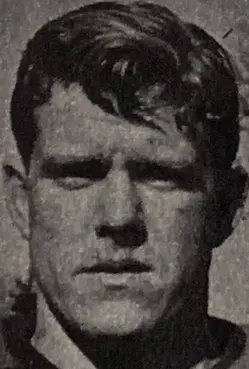

No. 23
- Position: Fullback

Personal information
- Born: December 25, 1921; San Antonio, Texas, U.S.
- Died: December 13, 2000 (aged 78); Houston, Texas, U.S.

Career information
- High school: Brackenridge
- College: Baylor Bears (1939–1942)

Career history
- Pittsburgh Steelers (1944)*; Boston Yanks (1944)
- * Offseason or practice squad member only

Thomas Milton Crain (December 25, 1921 – December 13, 2000), nicknamed "Freight Train", was an American professional football fullback. He played for the Pittsburgh Steelers and the Boston Yanks of the National Football League (NFL).

== Life and career ==
Crain was born in San Antonio, Texas. He was the brother of He played high school basketball and football at Brackenridge High School. He then enrolled at Baylor University to play college football for the Baylor Bears. He played on the team from 1939 to 1942, and was a two-time varsity letterman.

In April 1943, Crain was selected by the Pittsburgh Steelers of the National Football League (NFL) in the 15th round of the 1943 NFL draft. He joined the team in August 1944, but was purchased by the Boston Yanks in September 1944. He started four games, and played in ten games during the 1944 NFL season. After his football career ended, he worked as a landman at the Superior Oil Company for 32 years.

== Death ==
Crain died on December 13, 2000, in Houston, Texas, at the age of 78.
