= John Lyons (end) =

American football player (1911–1981)

Profile
- Positions: End, back

Personal information
- Born: September 10, 1911; Coronado, California
- Died: November 26, 1981 (aged 70); Bonita, California
- Listed height: 6 ft 1 in (1.85 m)
- Listed weight: 185 lb (84 kg)

Career information
- College: Tulsa

Career history
- Brooklyn Dodgers (1933)

John Stacy Lyons (September 10, 1911 – November 26, 1981) was an American football player.

Lyons was born in Coronado, California, in 1911. He played college football as a back for Tulsa from 1930 to 1932, winning a reputation as a "heavy but fast back", a battering blocker and a "hard line smasher."

Lyons joined the Brooklyn Dodgers of the National Football League (NFL) in the fall of 1933. The Brooklyn Times Union described him as follows:

Lyons is a blocking back and weighs 200 pounds. he combines all-around defensive skill and has been compared favorably with Father Lumpkin of Portsmouth in taking out a defensive end or back.

He played at the end position and appeared in two games for the Dodgers during the 1933 season.

Lyons died in 1981 in Bonita, California.
