= Chet Kozel =

American football player (1919–1982)

Profile
- Position: Tackle

Personal information
- Born: October 15, 1919; Kenosha, Wisconsin, U.S.
- Died: June 27, 1982 (aged 62); Kenosha, Wisconsin, U.S.
- Listed height: 6 ft 2 in (1.88 m)
- Listed weight: 211 lb (96 kg)

Career information
- College: Ole Miss (1938-1941)

Career history
- Buffalo Bills (1947-1948); Chicago Rockets (1948)

Career statistics
- Games played: 17
- Stats at Pro Football Reference

Chester R. Kozel (October 15, 1919 – June 27, 1982) was an American football lineman. He played college football for Ole Miss (1938–1941) and professional football for the Buffalo Bills (1947–1948) and Chicago Rockets (1948).

== Early life ==
Kozel was born in 1919 in Kenosha, Wisconsin, and attended Kenosha High School. In 1938, Kozel enrolled at the University of Wisconsin. He transferred in 1939 to the University of Mississippi. Kozel played at the tackle position for the Ole Miss Rebels football team from 1939 to 1941. He received a bachelor's degree in physical education from Ole Miss.

Kozel served in the United States Marine Corps during World War II. His brother Walter was killed while serving in the Army during the war.

== Professional football ==
In March 1947, while on terminal leave from the Marines, Kozel signed a contract to play professional football for the Buffalo Bills of the All-America Football Conference (AAFC). He played for the Bills as a tackle for the during the 1947 season and first part of the 1948 season. During the 1948 season, the Bills sold Kozel to the Chicago Rockets (1948). He appeared in 17 AAFC games, seven as a starter.

== Later life ==
Kozel was hired in 1951 as a teacher in the physical education department at his alma mater, Kenosha High School. In 1962, his car struck a passenger train traveling 90 miles per hour and was thrown 60 feet into a ditch; Kozel refused hospitalization for his injuries. He died in 1982 at age 62 at the Hospitality Manor Nursing Home in Kenosha.
