= Ben Roderick =

American football player (1899–1974)

No. 5 (1923 Canton): 2 (1923 Buffalo); 20 (1926); 11 (1927)
- Positions: Fullback, tailback

Personal information
- Born: May 11, 1899; Navarre, Ohio, U.S.
- Died: November 30, 1974 (aged 75); Canton, Ohio, U.S.
- Listed height: 5 ft 9 in (1.75 m)
- Listed weight: 179 lb (81 kg)

Career information
- College: Boston College, Columbia University, Wooster College

Career history
- Canton Bulldogs (1920); Cleveland Tigers (1921); Canton Bulldogs (1923); Buffalo All-Americans (1923); Canton Bulldogs (1926); Buffalo Bisons (1927)
- Stats at Pro Football Reference

Benjamin Aaron Roderick (May 11, 1899 – November 30, 1974) was an American professional football player during the early years of the National Football League (NFL) with the Buffalo All-Americans, Canton Bulldogs and Buffalo Bisons. Roderick won an NFL championship with the Canton Bulldogs in 1923. He also played for Cleveland Tigers, while playing in the American Professional Football Association, the organization that later became the NFL.

== College football ==
In 1922, Roderick transferred from Columbia University to Boston College. His teammate at Columbia, Sam Dana, who became the longest surviving NFL alumnus in 2003, referred to Roderick as "a sweetheart of a player". Dana later adopted Roderick's style of running.

== Korean War ==
Roderick was one of 226 NFL personnel who served in the military during the Korean War.

== Head coaching record ==
Year	Team	Overall	Conference	Standing	Bowl/playoffs
Ohio Northern Polar Bears (Ohio Athletic Conference) (1924–1925)
1924	Ohio Northern	4–3–1	3–3–1	T–10th	
1925	Ohio Northern	3–4–1	2–4–1	16th	
Ohio Northern:		7–7–2	5–7–2		
Total:		7–7–2			
