= Ed Doyle (American football) =

American football guard

Profile
- Position: Guard

Personal information
- Born: July 5, 1905; Buffalo, New York, U.S.
- Died: March 3, 1997 (aged 91); Niagara-on-the-Lake, Canada

Career information
- College: Canisius College

Career history
- 1927: Buffalo Bisons

Elmer John "Bud" Doyle (July 5, 1905 – March 3, 1997) was a professional American football guard in the National Football League (NFL). He played one season for the Buffalo Bisons (1927). He later became a champion sailboat racer on the Great Lakes. He died in 1997 at age 91.
