= Henry Orth (American football) =

American football player (1897–1980)

Profile
- Position: Guard

Personal information
- Born: November 20, 1897; Chillicothe, Ohio, U.S.
- Died: March 25, 1980 (aged 82); Zanesville, Ohio, U.S.
- Listed height: 6 ft 0 in (1.83 m)
- Listed weight: 180 lb (82 kg)

Career information
- High school: Chillicothe (Ohio)
- College: Miami (OH)

Career history
- Cincinnati Celts (1921)
- Stats at Pro Football Reference

Henry William Orth (November 20, 1897 – March 25, 1980) was an American professional football guard who played one season with the Cincinnati Celts of the American Professional Football Association (APFA). He played college football at Miami University.

== Early life and college ==
Henry William Orth was born on November 20, 1897, in Chillicothe, Ohio. He attended Chillicothe High School in Chillicothe.

Orth played college football for the Miami Redskins of Miami University. He was a two-year letterman from 1919 to 1920.

== Professional career ==
Orth played in one game for the Cincinnati Celts of the American Professional Football Association in 1921 as a guard. He stood 6'0" and weighed 180 pounds while with the Celts.

== Personal life ==
Orth served in the United States Army. He was also a football coach at Zanesville High School in the early 1920s.

Orth died on March 25, 1980, in Zanesville, Ohio.
