= Tommy Myers =

American football player (1901–1944)

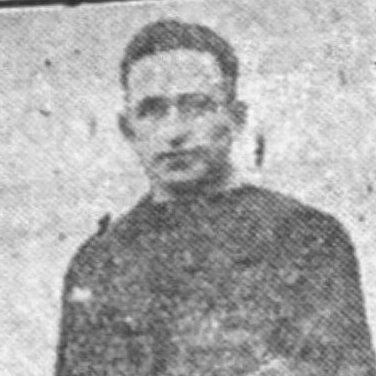
- Myers in 1923

Profile
- Position: Back

Personal information
- Born: February 9, 1901; New Britain, Connecticut, U.S.
- Died: July 1, 1944 (aged 43); New York City, New York, U.S.
- Listed height: 5 ft 8 in (1.73 m)
- Listed weight: 170 lb (77 kg)

Career information
- High school: Mahanoy City (Mahanoy City, Pennsylvania)
- College: Fordham (1920–1923)

Career history
- New York Giants (1925); Brooklyn Lions (1926)
- Stats at Pro Football Reference

Thomas J. Myers (February 9, 1901 – July 1, 1944) was an American professional football back who played two seasons in the National Football League (NFL) with the New York Giants and Brooklyn Lions. He played college football at Fordham University.

== Early life and college ==
Thomas J. Myers was born on February 9, 1901, in New Britain, Connecticut. He attended Mahanoy City High School in Mahanoy City, Pennsylvania.

Myers was a member of the Fordham Maroon of Fordham University from 1920 to 1923 and a three-year letterman from 1921 to 1923. He was team captain in 1923.

== Professional career ==
Myers played in two games for the New York Giants of the National Football League (NFL) during the team's inaugural 1925 season. He wore jersey number 4 while with the Giants.

Myers appeared in two games, starting one, for the Brooklyn Lions of the NFL in 1926. Myers stood 5'8" and weighed 170 pounds during his pro career.

== Personal life ==
Myers was a football coach and athletic director at St. Peter's Preparatory School from 1927 until his death in 1944. He died on July 1, 1944, in New York City after being sick for a year due to being hit by a piece of ice.
