= Herb Bizer =

American football player (1906–1974)

Profile
- Positions: End, fullback

Personal information
- Born: August 3, 1906; Mosel, Wisconsin, U.S.
- Died: December 3, 1974 (aged 68); Milwaukee, Wisconsin, U.S.
- Listed height: 5 ft 11 in (1.80 m)
- Listed weight: 205 lb (93 kg)

Career information
- College: Carroll (WI)

Career history
- Buffalo Bisons (1929)

Career statistics
- Games played: 9
- Stats at Pro Football Reference

Herbert Otto Bizer (August 3, 1906 – December 3, 1974) was an American multi-sport athlete, playing both American football and basketball in college. He later played professionally in the National Football League with the Buffalo Bisons during the 1929 NFL season.
