= Red Heater =

American football player (1918–2003)

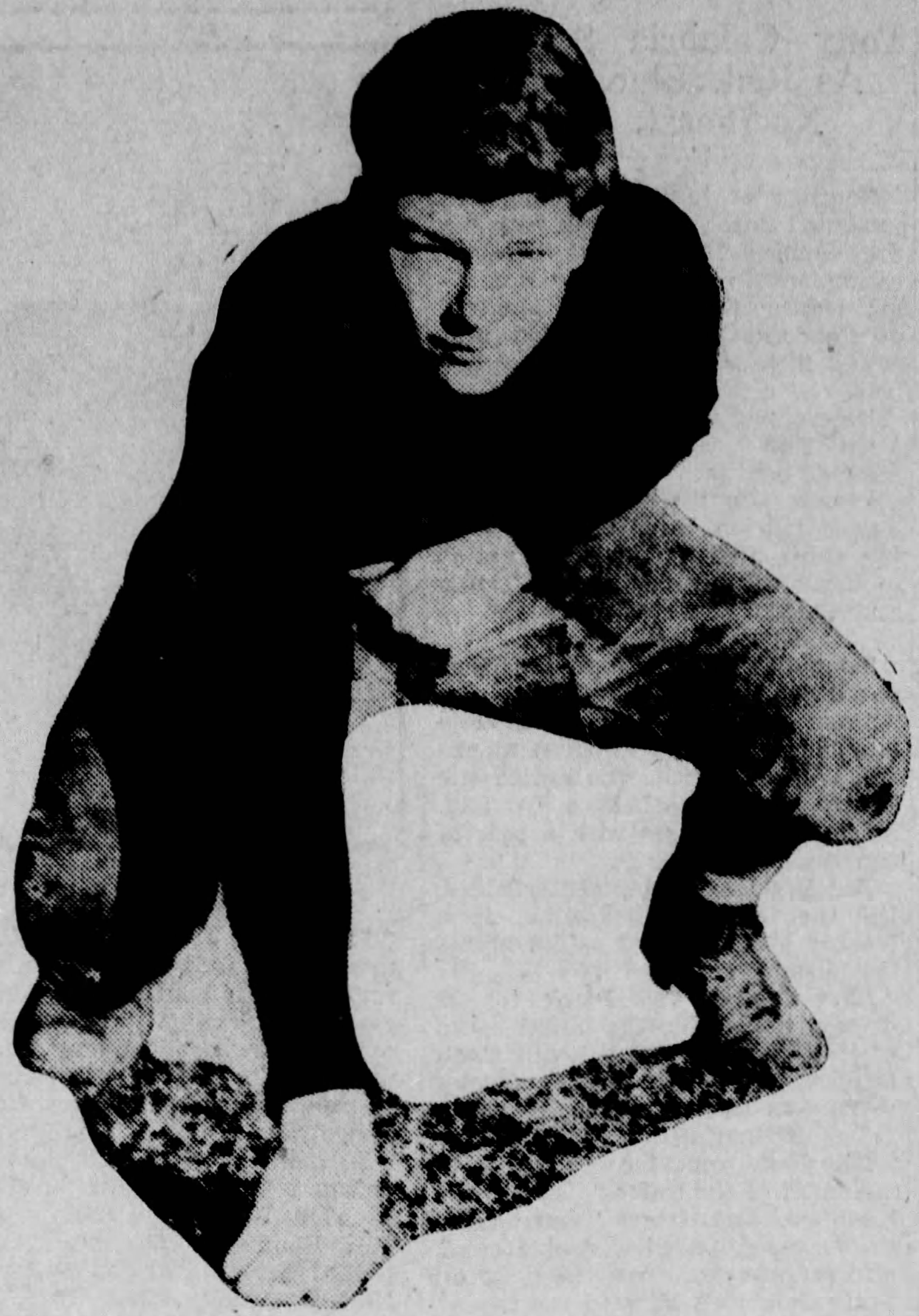
- Heater in high school, c. 1933-1937

No. 5
- Position: Tackle

Personal information
- Born: September 22, 1918; Reading, Pennsylvania, U.S.
- Died: October 24, 2003 (aged 85); Syracuse, New York, U.S.
- Listed height: 6 ft 2 in (1.88 m)
- Listed weight: 220 lb (100 kg)

Career information
- High school: Reading
- College: Syracuse (1936–1939)
- NFL draft: 1940: undrafted

Career history
- Brooklyn Dodgers (1940)
- Stats at Pro Football Reference

William Alfred "Red" Heater (September 22, 1918 – October 24, 2003) was an American professional football player who was a tackle for the Brooklyn Dodgers of the National Football League (NFL). He played college football for the Syracuse Orangemen.

== Early life ==
William Alfred Heater was born on September 22, 1918, in Reading, Pennsylvania. He played high school football at Reading Senior High School from 1934 to 1935 as a center, guard, and fullback. He was the starting center in 1934. Heater played guard in 1935 but was moved to fullback for several games due to another player suffering a broken nose. He intercepted two passes on defense that year. He earned all-state honors in football.

While in high school, Heater also played baseball for some local teams but not for Reading High. The Reading Times said that, in 1935, he "was one of the most powerful hitters ever on the local Legion nine." Heater was a member of the National Honor Society and graduated from high school in January 1936.

== College career ==
On June 5, 1936, Heater accepted an athletic scholarship to attend Syracuse University and play college football for the Orangemen. He was on the freshman team in 1936 as a guard. A few weeks before the start of the 1937 season, Heater was shifted to tackle. He was a three-year varsity letterman from 1937 to 1939. He majored in electrical engineering at Syracuse and graduated in 1940.

== Professional career ==
Heater went undrafted in the 1940 NFL draft. On May 21, 1940, it was reported that he had signed with the NFL's Brooklyn Dodgers. Heater played in eight games for the Dodgers during the 1940 season as a tackle. He became a free agent after the season.

== Personal life ==
Heater was nicknamed "Red" for his red hair. He served in the United States Navy during World War II, and also played football for the Navy. He worked in the sales engineering department of New Process Gear for 39 years.

Heater was a member of the Benevolent and Protective Order of Elks. On October 24, 2003, he died at his home in Westvale, a suburb of Syracuse, New York.
