= Paul Hogan (American football) =

American football player (1898–1976)

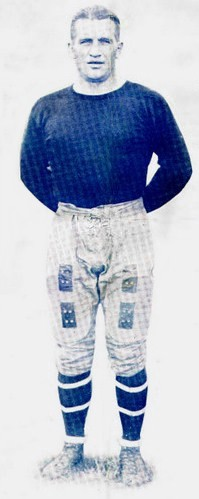

Profile
- Positions: Fullback, Halfback, Quarterback

Personal information
- Born: September 5, 1898; Ashtabula, Ohio, U.S.
- Died: August 13, 1976 (aged 78); Las Vegas, Nevada, U.S.
- Listed height: 5 ft 8 in (1.73 m)
- Listed weight: 170 lb (77 kg)

Career information
- High school: Ashtabula (OH)
- College: Detroit Mercy

Career history
- Akron Pros (1924); Canton Bulldogs (1925); New York Giants (1926); Frankford Yellow Jackets (1926); Chicago Cardinals (1927); Ironton Tanks (1927)

Awards and highlights
- NFL champion (1926)
- Stats at Pro Football Reference

Paul Timothy Hogan (September 5, 1898 – August 13, 1976) was a professional football player for the Akron Pros, Canton Bulldogs, New York Giants, Frankford Yellow Jackets and the Chicago Cardinals. He played football at Washington & Jefferson College, Notre Dame, University of Detroit Mercy, and Niagara University. He played in the National Football League (NFL) from 1924 through the 1927 season. Hogan won the 1926 NFL championship with the Yellow Jackets. After playing in the NFL, Paul joined the independent Ironton Tanks in 1927. In an 18–0 victory over Jim Thorpe and the Portsmouth Shoe-Steels, Hogan ran a punt back for a touchdown in the second quarter.
