= Carl Cardarelli =

American football player (died 1953)

No. 6
- Position: Center

Personal information
- Born: September 18, 1896 or 1897; Akron, Ohio, U.S.
- Died: April 22, 1953 (aged 55 or 56); Akron, Ohio, U.S.
- Listed height: 5 ft 9 in (1.75 m)
- Listed weight: 170 lb (77 kg)

Career information
- High school: Central (OH)
- College: none

Career history
- Akron Pros (1917); Akron Pros (1924); Cleveland Bulldogs (1925)

Career statistics
- Games played (career): 9
- Games started (career): 4
- Games played (NFL): 3
- Games started (NFL): 0
- Stats at Pro Football Reference

Carl Charles "Squash" Cardarelli (September 18, 1896 or 1897 – April 24, 1953) was an American football center who played for the Akron Pros and Cleveland Bulldogs. He played for the Pros in 1917 and again in 1924 and for the Bulldogs in 1925. He played in three National Football League games but played a total of nine in his career.
