= Ulysses Coumier =

American football player

No. 20
- Position: Fullback

Personal information
- Born: c. 1905
- Listed height: 5 ft 10 in (1.78 m)
- Listed weight: 195 lb (88 kg)

Career history
- Buffalo Bisons (1929)

Career statistics
- Games played: 3

Adonis "Ulysses" Coumier (born c. 1905), sometimes spelled as Ulysses Comier, and also known as "John" and "Johnny" Coumier, was an American football player.

Coumier was raised in Vinton, Louisiana, and attended the Southwestern Louisiana Institute (SLI), now known as the University of Louisiana at Lafayette. He played college football at SLI from 1926 to 1928 and was elected as the captain of the 1928 SLI football team.

He then played professional football in the National Football League (NFL) as a fullback for the Buffalo Bisons. He appeared in three NFL games, one as a starter, during the 1929 season. His one start was in a 19-7 victory over the Chicago Bears.
