= Red Werder =

American football player (1894–1942)

Profile
- Position: Tackle

Personal information
- Born: August 1, 1894; Pittsburgh, Pennsylvania, U.S.
- Died: April 11, 1942 (aged 47); Los Angeles, California, U.S.
- Listed height: 5 ft 11 in (1.80 m)
- Listed weight: 185 lb (84 kg)

Career information
- College: Dayton

Career history
- Buffalo All-Americans (1920); Tonawanda Kardex (1921)

Career statistics
- Games played: 5
- Games started: 1
- Stats at Pro Football Reference

Gerard John Werder (August 1, 1894 – April 11, 1942) was an American football tackle for two seasons in 1920 and 1921. He played for the Buffalo All-Americans in 1920 and the Tonawanda Kardex in 1921. In his career he played 5 games, 4 for Buffalo, 1 for Tonawanda. Werder went to college at Dayton. He died on April 4, 1942.
