= Walt Kreinheder =

American football player (1901–1960)

Profile
- Positions: Center, Guard

Personal information
- Born: September 8, 1901; Buffalo, New York
- Died: October 12, 1960 (aged 59); Boerne, Texas

Career information
- College: Michigan

Career history
- 1920–1921: Michigan
- 1922: Akron Pros
- 1923: St. Louis All-Stars
- 1925: Cleveland Bulldogs

Walter Roswell Kreinheder (September 8, 1901 – October 12, 1960) was an American football player. A native of Buffalo, New York, Kreinheder was a center for the Michigan Wolverines football team (playing as a substitute for All-American Ernie Vick) from 1920 to 1921. He later played professional football for the Akron Pros, St. Louis All-Stars, and Cleveland Bulldogs from 1922 to 1925. In 1923, he was selected as a first-team All-NFL player by Collyers Eye Magazine. He died in Texas in 1960.

== See also ==
- 1920 Michigan Wolverines football team
- 1921 Michigan Wolverines football team
