= Lou Mark =

American football player (1914–1961)

No. 12, 30
- Positions: Center, end

Personal information
- Born: December 21, 1914; New York, New York, U.S.
- Died: October 24, 1961 (aged 46)
- Listed height: 6 ft 1 in (1.85 m)
- Listed weight: 210 lb (95 kg)

Career information
- High school: White Plains (White Plains, New York)
- College: NC State
- NFL draft: 1938: 12th round, 103rd overall pick

Career history
- Brooklyn Dodgers (1938–1940); Boston Yanks (1945)

Career NFL statistics
- Games played: 39
- Games started: 19
- Stats at Pro Football Reference

Louis Mark (December 21, 1914 – October 24, 1961) was an American professional football player who played offensive lineman for four seasons for the Brooklyn Dodgers and Boston Yanks. He was drafted in the 12th round of the 1938 NFL Draft with the 103rd overall pick.
