= Babe Kraus =

American athlete and coach (1899–1966)

Biographical details
- Born: September 2, 1899; Fulton, New York, U.S.
- Died: September 5, 1966 (aged 67); Geneva, New York, U.S.

Playing career

Football
- 1920: Colgate
- 1921–1923: Hobart
- 1924: Buffalo Bisons

Basketball
- 1921–1924: Hobart

Lacrosse
- 1921–1924: Hobart
- Positions: Tackle, guard

Coaching career (HC unless noted)

Football
- 1932–1933: Hobart

Lacrosse
- 1925–1966: Hobart

Head coaching record
- Overall: 2–8–4 (football); 208–119–5 (lacrosse)

Francis Lucius "Babe" Kraus Sr. (September 2, 1899 – September 5, 1966) was an American football and lacrosse player and coach. After a college football career that included stops at Colgate University and Hobart and William Smith Colleges, Kraus played for the Buffalo Bisons of the National Football League (NFL) in 1924. Kraus served as the head football coach at his alma mater, Hobart, from 1932 to 1933. However, his biggest mark was left when he served as the school's head lacrosse coach from 1925 to 1966.
