= Ossie Wiberg =

American football player (1904–1989)

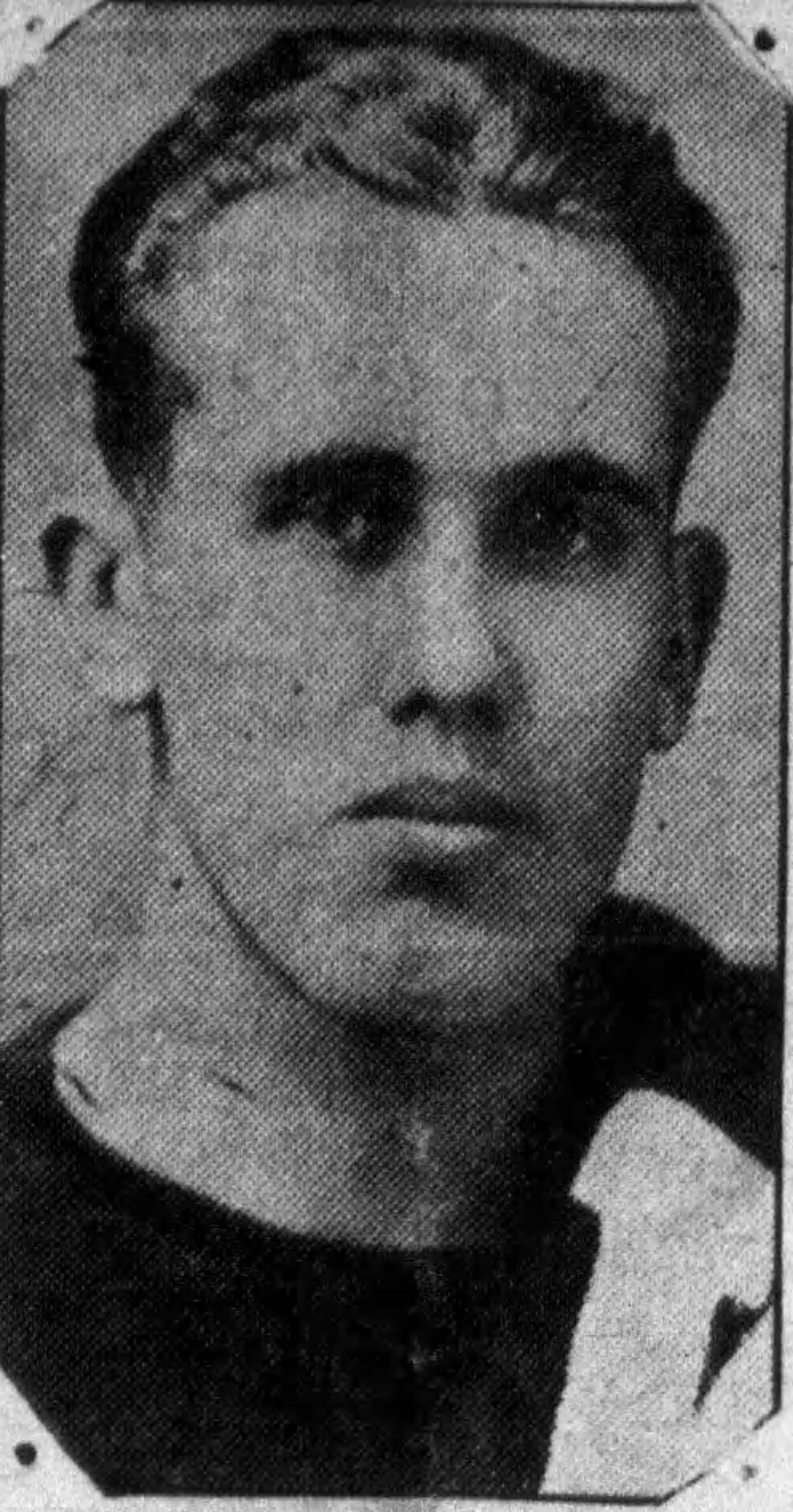
- Oscar Wiberg, 1924

Profile
- Position: Back

Personal information
- Born: October 11, 1904; Edgar, Nebraska
- Died: August 14, 1989 (aged 84); Gering, Nebraska
- Listed height: 5 ft 11 in (1.80 m)
- Listed weight: 207 lb (94 kg)

Career information
- High school: Edgard (NE)
- College: Nebraska Wesleyan

Career history
- Cleveland Bulldogs (1927); Detroit Wolverines (1928); New York Giants (1930); Brooklyn Dodgers (1932); Cincinnati Reds (1933)

Career statistics
- Rushing yards: 59
- Passing yards: 20
- Receiving yards: 29
- Extra points: 9
- Stats at Pro Football Reference

Oscar Malker Hilding "Wee" Wiberg (October 11, 1904 – August 14, 1989) was an American football player.

Wiberg was born in 1904 in Edgar, Nebraska, and attended Edgar High School. He played college football as a fullback for the Nebraska Wesleyan Coyotes from 1923 to 1926. He was selected as captain of Nebraska Wesleyan's 1925 team. He also competed for the track team and set a North Central Conference record in the shot put.

He played professional football in the National Football League (NFL) as a back for the Cleveland Bulldogs (1927), Detroit Wolverines (1928), New York Giants (1930), Brooklyn Dodgers (1932), and Cincinnati Reds (1933). He appeared in 44 NFL games, 35 as a starter, totaling 10 touchdowns, nine extra points, and 71 points scored. He also played for the Passaic Red Devils from 1932 and 1933.

Wiberg died in 1989 in Gering, Nebraska.
