= Cassy Ryan =

American football player (1905–1981)

Profile
- Position: Quarterback

Personal information
- Born: May 10, 1905; Mannington, West Virginia, U.S.
- Died: January 6, 1981 (aged 75); Fairmont, West Virginia, U.S.
- Listed height: 5 ft 9 in (1.75 m)
- Listed weight: 160 lb (73 kg)

Career information
- High school: Mannington (WV)
- College: West Virginia

Career history
- Buffalo Bisons (1929)

Career statistics
- Games: 9

Clarence Daniel "Cassy" Ryan (May 10, 1905 – January 6, 1981) was an American football player.

Ryan was born in 1905 in Mannington, West Virginia, and attended Mannington High School. He played college football for the West Virginia Mountaineers from 1926 to 1928. He also played second base for the West Virginia baseball team for three years.

During the 1929 season, Ryan played professional football in the National Football League (NFL) as a quarterback for the Buffalo Bisons. He appeared in nine NFL games, six as a starter. On November 24, 1929, he returned a kickoff for 85 yards and a touchdown against the Chicago Bears.

Ryan later worked for 40 years as a coach at Farmington and Mannington in the Marion County, West Virginia, schools. He died in 1985 at age 75 in Fairmont, West Virginia.
