= Ed Comstock =

American football player (1903–1980)

Personal information
- Born: July 12, 1903
- Died: December 8, 1980 (aged 77); Belle Mead (in Montgomery Township, New Jersey)
- Listed height: 6 ft 2 in (1.88 m)
- Listed weight: 208 lb (94 kg)

Career history
- Buffalo Bisons (1929); Brooklyn Dodgers (1930); Staten Island Stapletons (1930)
- Stats at Pro Football Reference

Elwyn "Ed" Comstock (July 12, 1903 – December 8, 1980) was an American professional football player who played in the National Football League (NFL) for two seasons with the Buffalo Bisons, Brooklyhn Dodgers, and Staten Island Stapletons. Comstock would appear in a total of 23 career games, while making 10 starts.
