= Ben Greenberg =

American football player (1907–1984)

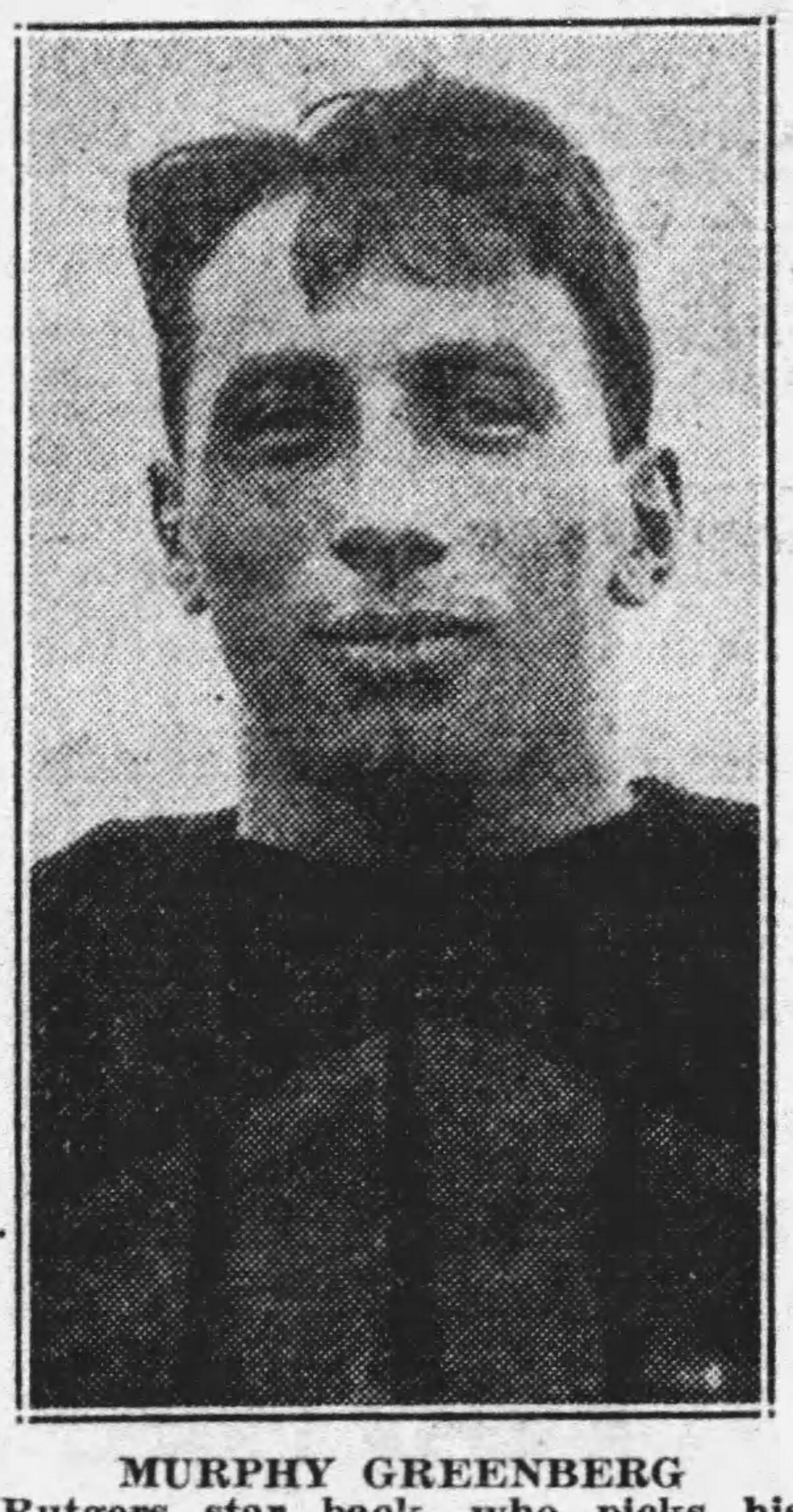
- Greenberg, c. 1929, at Rutgers

Profile
- Positions: Fullback, halfback

Personal information
- Born: June 30, 1907; New York, New York
- Died: October 22, 1984 (aged 77)
- Listed height: 5 ft 9 in (1.75 m)
- Listed weight: 175 lb (79 kg)

Career information
- High school: Leonia (NJ)
- College: Rutgers

Career history
- Brooklyn Dodgers (1930)

Benjamin Norman "Murphy" Greenberg (June 30, 1907 – October 22, 1984) was an American football player.

A native of New York City, Greenberg moved to Leonia, New Jersey at an early age. He competed in football, baseball track, baseball, and boxing as a teenager. He played college football as a halfback and fullback for Rutgers University from 1927 to 1929.

He then played professional football in the National Football League (NFL) as a fullback for the Brooklyn Dodgers in 1930. He appeared in two NFL games.

He died in 1984 in Fort Lee, New Jersey.
