= Horse Hagerty =

American football player (1905–1991)

Profile
- Position: Fullback

Personal information
- Born: April 16, 1905; Blanchard, Iowa, U.S.
- Died: March 26, 1991 (aged 85); Contra Costa County, California, U.S.
- Listed height: 5 ft 10 in (1.78 m)
- Listed weight: 185 lb (84 kg)

Career information
- High school: Greeley (CO)
- College: Iowa

Career history
- Brooklyn Dodgers (1930)

Loris James "Horse" Hagerty (April 16, 1905 – March 26, 1991) was an American football player.

A native of Blanchard, Iowa, Hagerty attended the University of Iowa where he played football and competed in track. At Iowa, he played in the backfield with Willis Glassgow.

Hagerty later played professional football in the National Football League (NFL) as a fullback for the Brooklyn Dodgers. He appeared in nine NFL games during the 1930 season, two as a starter.
