= Earl Elser =

American football player (1908–1974)

- Elser in 1930

No. 49, 27, 55, 20
- Positions: Guard, tackle, end

Personal information
- Born: March 21, 1908; Chicago, Illinois, U.S.
- Died: August 28, 1974 (aged 66); Hobart, Indiana, U.S.
- Listed height: 6 ft 1 in (1.85 m)
- Listed weight: 229 lb (104 kg)

Career information
- High school: Emerson (Gary, Indiana)
- College: Michigan (1927); Butler (1929–1932)

Career history
- Portsmouth Spartans (1933); Cincinnati Reds (1934); St. Louis Gunners (1934); Boston Shamrocks (1936)

Career NFL statistics
- Games played: 13
- Stats at Pro Football Reference

Earl Howard Elser (March 21, 1908 – August 28, 1974) was an American professional football player. A guard, tackle and end, he played college football for the Michigan Wolverines and Butler Bulldogs and later three seasons professionally. Elser was a member of the Portsmouth Spartans, Cincinnati Reds and St. Louis Gunners in the National Football League (NFL) from 1933 to 1934, and a member of the Boston Shamrocks of the American Football League (AFL) in 1936.

== Early life ==
Elser was born on March 21, 1908, in Chicago, Illinois, before moving to Gary, Indiana. He was the brother of Don Elser, who played football for the Notre Dame Fighting Irish and later professional basketball. In Gary, Elser attended Emerson High School where he competed in football as an end and in track and field, excelling in the shot put. Elser served as captain for the football team from 1925 to 1926, helping them to a share of the conference championship as a senior while earning all-state honors.

== College career ==
After high school, Elser enrolled at the University of Michigan in 1927 to play for the Michigan Wolverines football team. He was a member of the freshman team that year, playing end and weighing 190 pounds (86 kg). However, his season was plagued by injuries, including a sprained ankle and broken arm. Two years later, he joined the freshman team for the Butler Bulldogs of Butler University in Indiana.

Elser played for the Butler varsity team in 1930 as a tackle and end. He and several other Butler players were investigated on charges of professionalism during the season, but Elser was allowed to continue playing. The Mitchell Tribune described him as a "giant end" and noted that he performed well during the season despite suffering injuries. He lettered in 1930 and again in 1931. By 1932, his last year, Elser weighed 225 pounds (102 kg) and was used as a lineman and punter. He earned another letter for the 1932 season while the Bulldogs compiled a record of 2–4–1. At Butler, Elser also competed in track and field in weight events, although for the 1933 season he was ruled ineligible for in-state competitions due to having attended another college previously.

== Professional career ==
Elser signed with the Portsmouth Spartans of the National Football League (NFL) in 1933. There, he joined his Butler coach Potsy Clark. Playing guard and tackle, he appeared in four (Note: Listed as three by Pro Football Archives.) regular season games for the team as they compiled a record of 6–5. In late December 1933, he was traded along with three others from the Spartans to the Cincinnati Reds for Lloyd Burdick. Elser won a starting role for the Reds in 1934 at tackle. In the season opener, he fractured his nose for what The Cincinnati Post reported to be the 14th time. He ended up playing in all eight of the Reds' games, seven as a starter, while they lost all of them and folded. After the Reds folded, Elser joined their replacement, the St. Louis Gunners, and appeared in one game as a backup. Two years later, he played for the Boston Shamrocks of the American Football League (AFL) along with his brother Don, appearing in five games as a backup. During his professional career, Elser stood at 6 feet 1 inch (1.85 m) and weighed 229 pounds (104 kg). He appeared in a total of 13 (Note: Listed as 12 by Pro Football Archives.) NFL games.

== Personal life ==
Elser served in the United States Army. In 1931, Elser and his wife, Bernice, testified as witnesses during the high-profile trial of Virgil Kirkland, a local athlete accused of murdering Arlene Draves at a party. Kirkland's defense intimated that Elser had made advances toward Draves, which he denied, and alleged that Bernice had been the one to attack Draves. The trial resulted in Kirkland being sentenced to one to ten years in a reformatory.

In 1946, Elser was named head of the Indiana Alcoholic Beverage commission office in East Chicago. A member of the Republican Party, he ran for office to be the sheriff of Lake County, Indiana, in 1954, but finished third in his party's primary. He died on August 28, 1974, in Hobart, at the age of 66.
