= Dutch Wallace =

American football player (1900–1977)

No. 10 (1923), 16 (1924), 18, 17 (1925), 12 (1926)
- Position: Offensive Lineman

Personal information
- Born: April 18, 1900; Akron, Ohio, United States
- Died: February 1977 (aged 76)
- Listed height: 6 ft 0 in (1.83 m)
- Listed weight: 203 lb (92 kg)

Career information
- College: None

Career history
- Akron Pros (1923–1924); Cleveland Bulldogs (1925); Akron Indians (1926); Canton Bulldogs (1926)
- Stats at Pro Football Reference

Clarence "Dutch" Wallace (April 18, 1900 – February 1977) was a professional football player who played four seasons in the National Football League. He made his debut in the NFL in 1923 with the Akron Pros. He played for the Akron Pros, Akron Indians, Canton Bulldogs and Cleveland Bulldogs over the course of his career.
