= Ed Aspatore =

American football player (1909–1986)

No. 37, 26
- Positions: Guard, tackle

Personal information
- Born: June 23, 1909; Fond du Lac, Wisconsin, U.S.
- Died: March 14, 1986 (aged 76); Louisville, Kentucky, U.S.
- Listed height: 6 ft 1 in (1.85 m)
- Listed weight: 220 lb (100 kg)

Career information
- High school: Fond du Lac
- College: Marquette

Career history
- Chicago Bears (1934); Cincinnati Reds (1934); Louisville Tanks (1937)
- Stats at Pro Football Reference

Edward Charles Aspatore (June 23, 1909 – March 14, 1986) was an American professional football player in the National Football League (NFL).

== Biography ==
Aspatore was born on June 23, 1909, in Fond du Lac, Wisconsin.

== Career ==
Aspatore played with the Chicago Bears and the Cincinnati Reds during the 1934 NFL season as a guard and tackle. Prior to the NFL, he played collegiately at Marquette University.
