= Jim Woodruff =

American football player (1903–2007)

Profile
- Position: End

Personal information
- Born: July 11, 1903; Johnson County, Nebraska
- Died: November 21, 2007 (aged 104); Tucson, Arizona
- Listed height: 6 ft 3 in (1.91 m)
- Listed weight: 210 lb (95 kg)

Career information
- High school: Hillsboro (IL)

Career history
- Chicago Cardinals (1926); Buffalo Bisons (1929)

Career statistics
- Games: 7

James Lee Woodruff (July 11, 1903 – November 21, 2007) was an American football player.

Woodruff was born in 1903 (although some sources give 1905) in Johnson County, Nebraska. He grew up and attended high school in Hillsboro, Illinois. He attended the University of Illinois.

Woodruff played professional football in the National Football League (NFL) as an end and tackle for the Chicago Cardinals in 1926 and the Buffalo Bisons in 1929. He appeared in seven NFL games, five as a starter. He scored one touchdown during the 1929 season.

Woodruff served as the President of the Illinois Funeral Directors Association. He died in 2007 in Tucson, Arizona. He is said to have been the longest lived NFL player in history.
