= Chet Gay =

American football player (1900–1978)

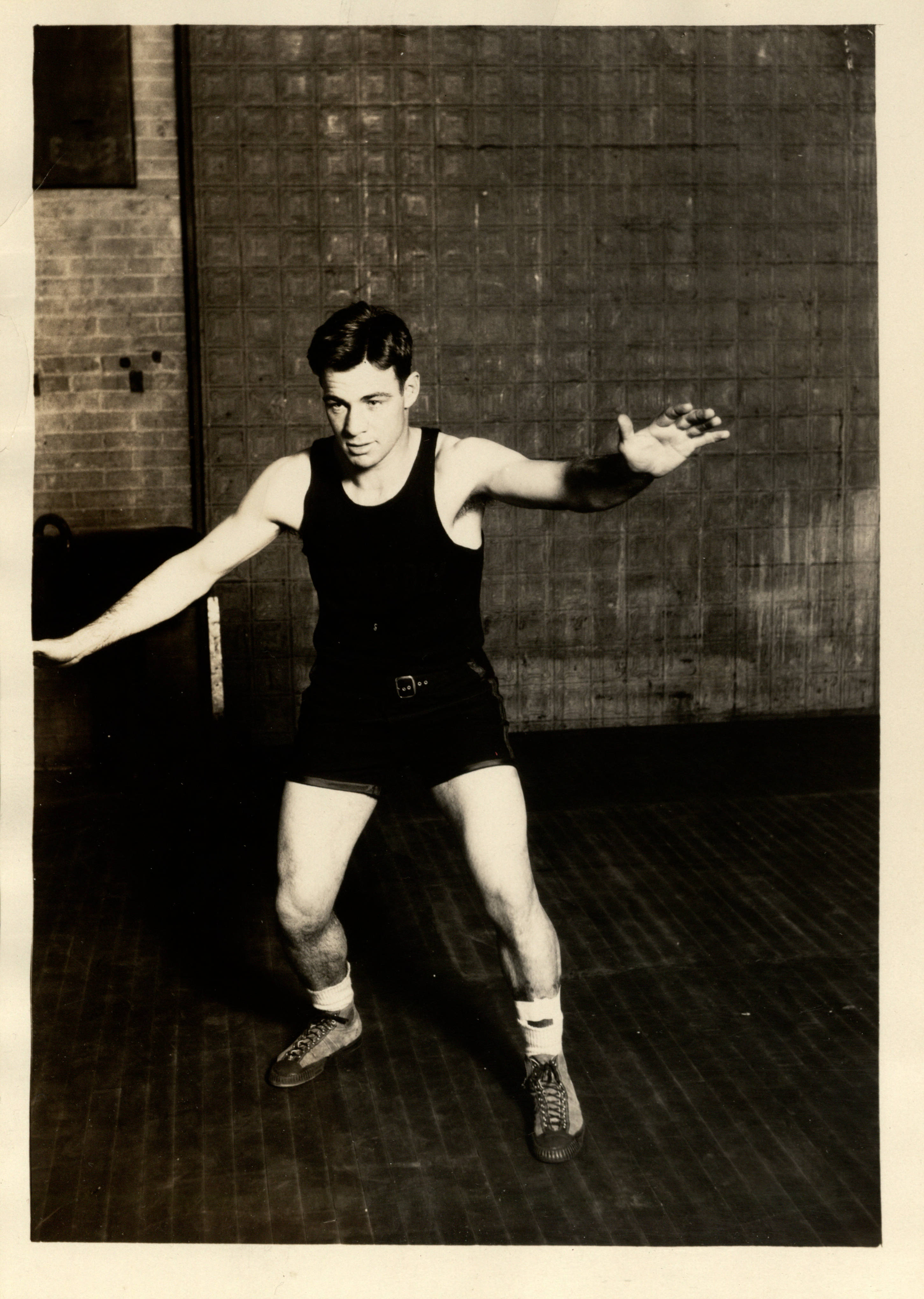

Profile
- Position: Offensive lineman

Personal information
- Born: January 8, 1900; Moose Lake, Minnesota
- Died: March 11, 1978 (aged 78); Carlton County, Minnesota
- Listed height: 6 ft 0 in (1.83 m)
- Listed weight: 215 lb (98 kg)

Career information
- College: Minnesota

Career history
- Buffalo Bisons (1925); Milwaukee Badgers (1926)

Career statistics
- Gamed played: 14
- Stats at Pro Football Reference

Chester Joseph "Chet" Gay (January 8, 1900 – March 11, 1978) was an American football player in the National Football League. He first played with the Buffalo Bisons during the 1925 NFL season before playing the following season with the Milwaukee Badgers.
