= Ruel Redinger =

American football player (1896–1969)

No. 5
- Position: Halfback

Personal information
- Born: December 31, 1896; Washington, Pennsylvania, U.S.
- Died: September 26, 1969 (aged 72); Valley City, Ohio, U.S.
- Listed height: 5 ft 10 in (1.78 m)
- Listed weight: 185 lb (84 kg)

Career information
- High school: Washington (Washington, Pennsylvania)
- College: Penn State, Colgate

Career history
- Canton Bulldogs (1925)

Career statistics
- Games played: 7
- Games started: 5
- Stats at Pro Football Reference

Otis Ruel "Pete" Redinger (December 31, 1896 – September 26, 1969) was an American football player who played professionally for one season in the National Football League (NFL) with the Canton Bulldogs, during the 1925 season. Redinger played college football at Pennsylvania State University and Colgate University.
