= Art Dorfman =

American football player (1908–1997)

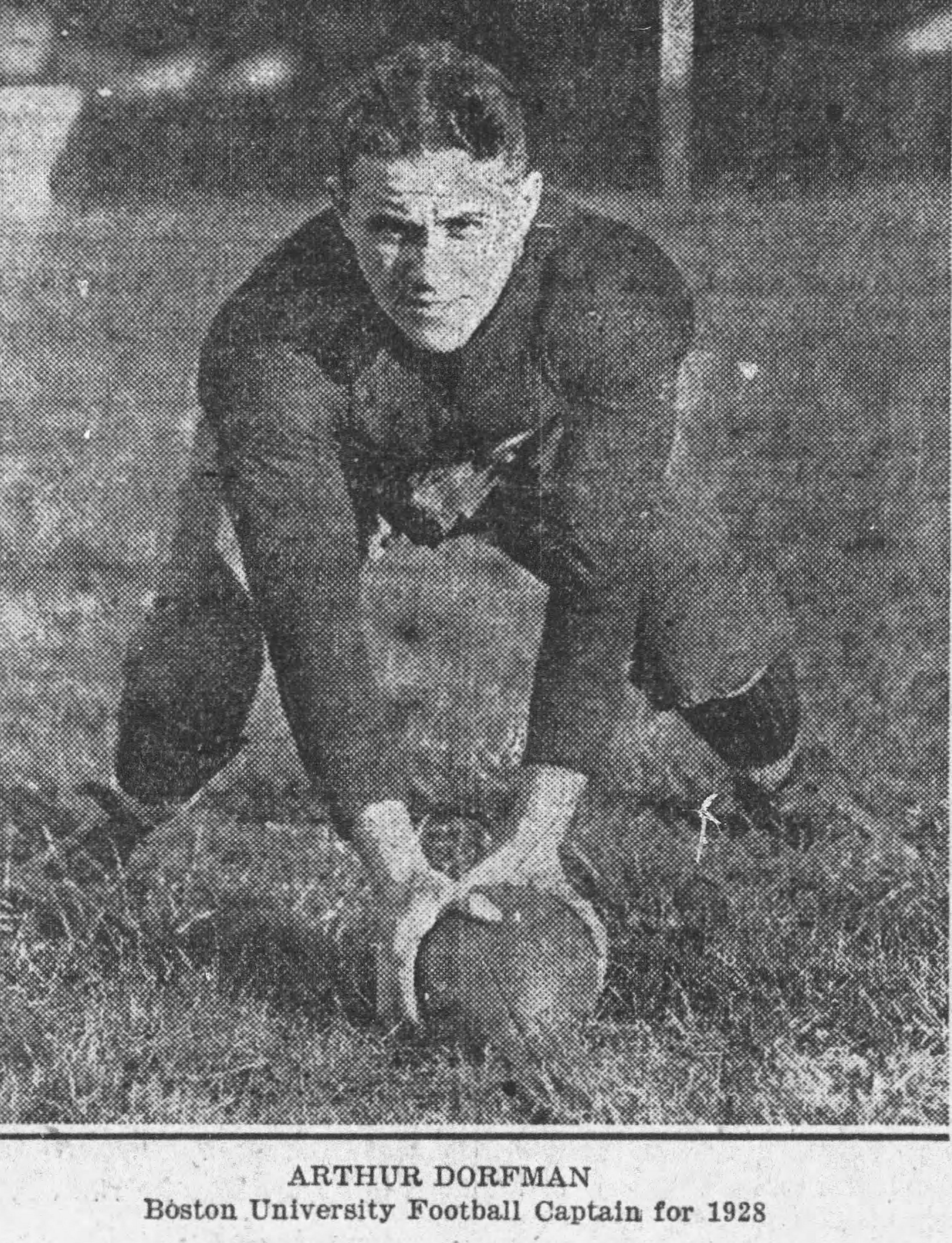
- Dorfman c. 1927

Profile
- Position: Center

Personal information
- Born: May 9, 1908; Odesa, Russian Empire
- Died: September 23, 1997 (aged 89); Boston, Massachusetts, U.S.
- Listed height: 5 ft 10 in (1.78 m)
- Listed weight: 210 lb (95 kg)

Career information
- High school: Dorchester High School (Massachusetts)
- College: Boston University

Career history
- Buffalo Bisons (1929)

Career statistics
- Games: 9
- Stats at Pro Football Reference

Arthur Dorfman (May 9, 1908 – September 23, 1997) was an American football player.

A native of Odesa, Russian Empire, he attended Dorchester High School where he competed in baseball, football, and ice hockey.

Dorfman played college football at Boston University in 1927 and 1928. He was described by The Boston Globe in 1928 as "the mainstay" of Boston University's line. He was elected captain of the 1928 Boston University football team.

He then played professional football in the National Football League (NFL) as a center for the Buffalo Bisons. He appeared in nine NFL games, eight as a starter, during the 1929 season.

Dorfman died in 1997 at age 89 at the Hebrew Rehabilitation Center for the Aged in Boston. He was married to Elaine (Kovitz) Dorfman for 61 years.
