= Spin Roy =

American football player (1896–1947)

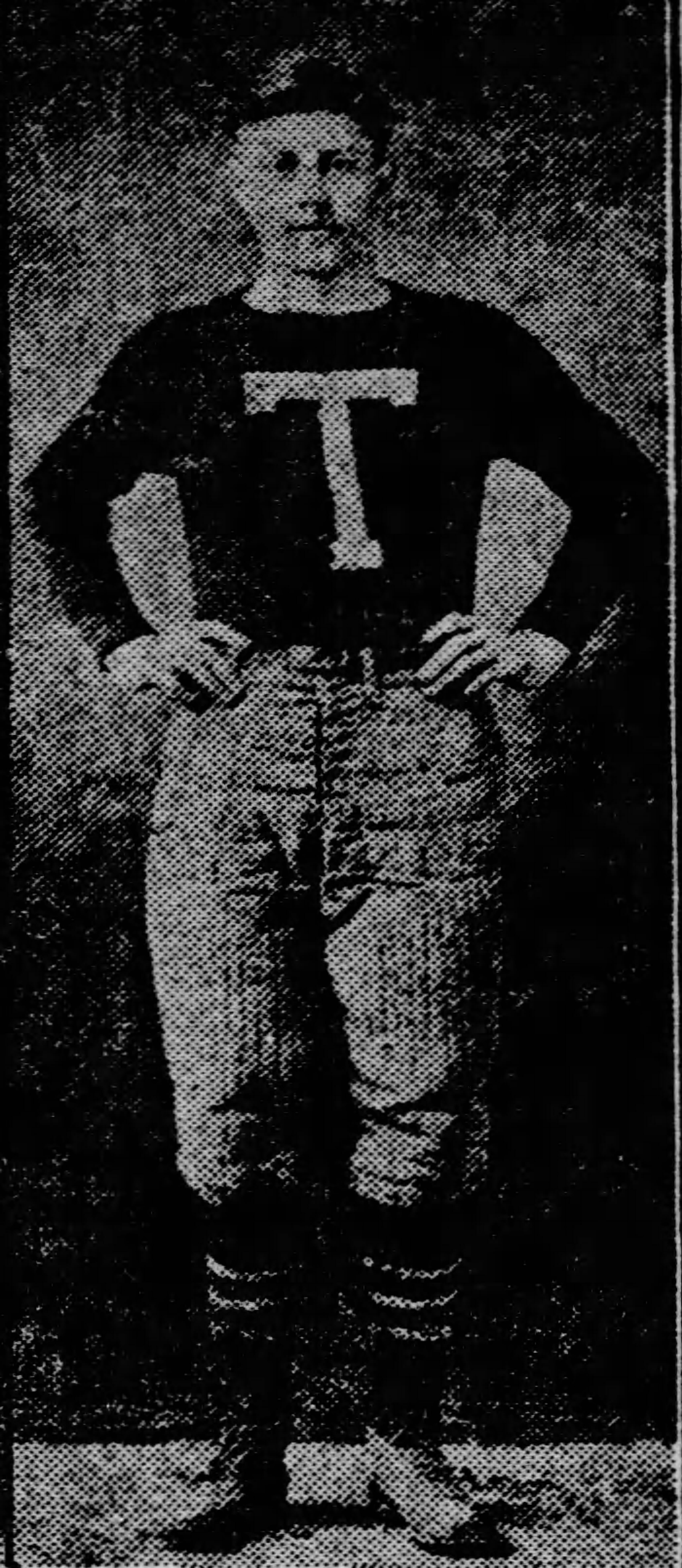
- Spin Roy, 1917

Profile
- Position: End

Personal information
- Born: October 23, 1896; Alexander, New York, US
- Died: April 28, 1947 (aged 50); North Tonawanda, New York, US
- Listed height: 6 ft 0 in (1.83 m)
- Listed weight: 175 lb (79 kg)

Career information
- High school: North Tonawanda (NY)

Career history
- Rochester Jeffersons (1921–1925); Buffalo Bisons (1927)

Elmer Thomas "Spin" Roy (October 23, 1896 – April 28, 1947) was an American football player.

Roy was born in 1896 in Alexander, New York, moved to North Tonawanda, New York, as a boy and attended North Tonawanda High School. He was a star football player at North Tonawanda. During World War I, he served in the Army.

He played at the end position in the National Football League (NFL) for the Rochester Jeffersons from 1921 and 1925 and for the Buffalo Bisons in 1927. He appeared in 22 NFL games, 16 of them as a starter. He also played professional football for the Eldredge Bicycle Club of Tonawanda.

In later years, Roy worked for Bell Aircraft in Buffalo, New York. He died of a heart attack in 1947 at his home in North Tonawanda.
