= Charlie Huneke =

American football player (1921–1990)

Profile
- Position: Tackle

Personal information
- Born: January 1, 1921; Lincoln, Illinois
- Died: September 5, 1990 (aged 69)
- Listed height: 6 ft 3 in (1.91 m)
- Listed weight: 225 lb (102 kg)

Career information
- College: St. Mary's (TX), Benedictine, Wyoming

Career history
- Chicago Rockets (1946-1947); Brooklyn Dodgers (1947-1948)
- Stats at Pro Football Reference

Charles Franklin Huneke (January 1, 1921 – September 5, 1990) was an American football tackle.

Huneke was born in Lincoln, Illinois, and attended Cathedral Boys High School. He played college football for St. Mary's (TX), but then transferred to St. Benedict's in Kansas. Huneke also played at center for the St. Benedict's basketball team and was the second-leading scorer. He also played for the University of Wyoming.

He served in the Marine Corps during World War II and played on the El Toro Marines football team in 1944 and 1945. The 1944 El Toro Flying Marines football team compiled an 8–1 record and was ranked No. 16 in the final AP Poll.

After the war, he played professional football in the All-America Football Conference for the Chicago Rockets from 1946 to 1947 and for the Brooklyn Dodgers from 1947 to 1948. He appeared in 29 games, 11 as a starter.

Huneke died in 1990.
