= Nat McCombs =

American football player (1904–1965)

Profile
- Positions: Guard, tackle

Personal information
- Born: December 18, 1904; Eufaula, Oklahoma, U.S.
- Died: July 15, 1965 (aged 60); Eufaula, Oklahoma, U.S.
- Listed height: 5 ft 11 in (1.80 m)
- Listed weight: 226 lb (103 kg)

Career information
- High school: Eufaula (OK)
- College: Haskell

Career history
- Akron Indians (1926); Buffalo Bisons (1929)

Career statistics
- Games: 17
- Stats at Pro Football Reference

Nathaniel Hawthorne McCombs (December 18, 1904 – July 15, 1965) was an American football player. He played college football for Haskell and professional football in the National Football League (NFL) as a guard and tackle for the Akron Indians and Buffalo Bisons. He appeared in 17 NFL games, 15 as a starter, during the 1926 and 1929 seasons.
