= Swede Hagberg =

American football player (1907–1960)

Profile
- Position: Center

Personal information
- Born: June 18, 1907; Charleroi, Pennsylvania, U.S.
- Died: November 25, 1960 (aged 53); Steubenville, Ohio, U.S.
- Listed height: 6 ft 4 in (1.93 m)
- Listed weight: 219 lb (99 kg)

Career information
- College: West Virginia

Career history
- Buffalo Bisons (1929); Brooklyn Dodgers (1930)

Awards and highlights
- All-Pro (1930)

Career statistics
- Games played: 21
- Games started: 21
- Touchdowns: 4

Rudolph Emil "Swede" Hagberg (June 18, 1907 – November 25, 1960) was a professional American football center in the National Football League (NFL). He played two seasons for the Buffalo Bisons (1929) and the Brooklyn Dodgers (1930). He played a game for the Brooklyn Visitations as a center in the final season of the very first original iteration of the American Basketball League.
