= Andy Dudish =

American football player (1918–2001)

Profile
- Position: Halfback

Personal information
- Born: October 13, 1918; Wilkes-Barre, Pennsylvania, U.S.
- Died: January 19, 2001 (aged 82); Lawrenceville, Georgia, U.S.
- Listed height: 5 ft 11 in (1.80 m)
- Listed weight: 182 lb (83 kg)

Career information
- College: Georgia

Career history
- Buffalo Bisons (1946); Baltimore Colts (1947); Detroit Lions (1948)
- Stats at Pro Football Reference

Andrew Charles Dudish (October 13, 1918 – January 19, 2001) was an American football halfback.

Dudish was born in Wilkes-Barre, Pennsylvania, in 1918 and attended Hanover High School in Hanover, Pennsylvania. He played college football for Georgia from 1940 to 1942. He was a member of the undefeated 1942 Georgia Bulldogs football team that won a national championship. He played in Georgia's backfield with Frank Sinkwich and earned a reputation as "a vicious, savage tackler" and "one of the most outstanding defensive backs Georgia has ever known."

Dudish served in the Army from 1943 to 1945 during World War II. He suffered a fractured vertebrae in 1944 during a football game at Fort Benning.

Dudish played professional football in the All-America Football Conference for the Buffalo Bisons in 1946 and Baltimore Colts in 1947 and in the National Football League for the Detroit Lions in 1948. He appeared in 29 professional football games, six of them as a starter, and totaled 141 rushing yards, 163 receiving yards, 622 punt and kick return yards, and two touchdowns.

After retiring as a player, Dudish worked for a life insurance company and coached youth football in Georgia. With his wife, Lugenia, he had two sons and three daughters. He died in 2001 in Lawrenceville, Georgia, of complications from pneumonia.
