= Wooky Roberts =

American football player (1897–1951)

No. 11, 3, 2, 5
- Positions: Fullback, Tailback

Personal information
- Born: September 1, 1897; Elmwood, Illinois, U.S.
- Died: August 27, 1951 (aged 53); Drexel Hill, Pennsylvania, U.S.
- Listed height: 5 ft 7 in (1.70 m)
- Listed weight: 160 lb (73 kg)

Career information
- College: Navy

Career history
- Canton Bulldogs (1922–1923); Cleveland Bulldogs (1924–1925); Frankford Yellow Jackets (1926)

Awards and highlights
- 4× NFL champion (1922, 1923, 1924, 1926); All-NFL - Canton Daily News (1923); Consensus All-American (1918)

Career statistics
- Games played: 36
- Games started: 28
- Stats at Pro Football Reference

Wolcott A. "Wooky" Roberts (September 1, 1897 – August 27, 1951) was an American professional football player during the early years of the National Football League (NFL). Roberts won two NFL championships with the Canton Bulldogs in 1922 and 1923, one with the Cleveland Bulldogs in 1924, and another with the Frankford Yellow Jackets in 1926.

He played college football for the Navy Midshipmen football team while attending the United States Naval Academy. After the 1918 season, he was selected as a consensus first-team halfback on the 1918 College Football All-America Team.

Before enrolling at the Naval Academy, Roberts was a student at Colgate University. After completing his service in the Navy, he worked as a structural engineer with the Industrial Power Equipment Company in Philadelphia. He died at his home in Drexel Hill, Pennsylvania, in August 1951 at age 53.
