= Walt Brewster =

American football player (1907–1985)

Personal information
- Full name: Walt Southgate Brewster
- Born: August 16, 1907 Plymouth, Massachusetts, USA
- Died: January 30, 1985 (aged 77) New Orleans, Louisiana, USA
- Education: West Virginia University
- Height: 6 ft 1 in (185 cm)
- Weight: 195 lb (88 kg)

Sport
- Sport: American football
- Position: Offensive tackle
- University team: West Virginia Mountaineers
- League: National Football League
- Team: Buffalo Bisons (1929)

Walt Southgate Brewster (August 16, 1907 – January 30, 1985) was an American professional football player with the National Football League's Buffalo Bisons in 1929. Brewster was the starting right offensive tackle in seven games of the eight-game season, listed as 6'1 195 lbs. He went to West Virginia University, and was born in 1907 (sources vary as to date) in Plymouth, Massachusetts, United States. He died in New Orleans, Louisiana.
