= Phil Peterson =

American football player (1906–1981)

Profile
- Position: End

Personal information
- Born: March 29, 1906
- Died: March 26, 1981 (aged 74)
- Listed height: 5 ft 11 in (1.80 m)
- Listed weight: 195 lb (88 kg)

Career information
- College: Wisconsin

Career history
- Brooklyn Dodgers (1934)
- Stats at Pro Football Reference

Phil Peterson (1906–1981) was an American football player. He played for the Brooklyn Dodgers during the 1934 NFL season. He played at the collegiate level with the Wisconsin Badgers.
