= Twing Seeds =

American football player (1896–1963)

Profile
- Position: Wingback

Personal information
- Born: February 2, 1901; Salem, Ohio, U.S.
- Died: July 24, 1952 (aged 51); Salem, Ohio, U.S.
- Listed weight: 170 lb (77 kg)

Career information
- College: Ohio State, Iowa State

Career history
- Canton Bulldogs (1926)
- Stats at Pro Football Reference

Guy Twing Seeds (February 2, 1901 – July 24, 1952), sometimes known as "Slippery" Seeds, was a professional football player who played in the National Football League (NFL) during the 1926 season with the Canton Bulldogs.

== Early life and career ==
Seeds attended Salem High School and was considered one of the best athletes in the city. He later attended Ohio State University and Iowa State University and played for several semi-pro sports teams in addition to one game with the Canton Bulldogs.

== Death ==
Seeds died in July 1952, at the age of 51.
