= Jim Mooney (American football) =

American football player (1907–1944)

Profile
- Positions: Guard, End, Fullback

Personal information
- Born: September 16, 1907; Chicago, Illinois, U.S.
- Died: August 12, 1944 (aged 36); German-occupied France †

Career information
- High school: Chicago (IL) Loyola
- College: Georgetown

Career history
- 1930: Newark Tornadoes
- 1930–1931: Brooklyn Dodgers
- 1933: Cincinnati Reds
- 1934: St. Louis Gunners
- 1935: Chicago Cardinals

Awards and highlights
- Second-team All-American (1928); Georgetown Athletic Hall of Fame (1953)

Other information
- Military career
- Allegiance: United States
- Branch: U.S. Army
- Service years: 1943–1945
- Rank: Corporal
- Unit: 110th Infantry Regiment
- Conflicts: World War II: Western Front; Western Allied invasion of France †

James L. Mooney Jr. (September 16, 1907 – August 12, 1944) was an American football player in the National Football League (NFL) for the Newark Tornadoes, Brooklyn Dodgers, Cincinnati Reds, St. Louis Gunners and Chicago Cardinals. Prior to his professional career, Mooney played college football at Georgetown University. In high school, he was a star halfback at Loyola Academy.

After the end of his NFL career, Mooney became a patrolman for the Chicago Police Department, for whom his father worked as a detective, at the Hudson avenue station. He returned to football in 1940 as a coach for the Chicago Gunners; he had also coached the New York Yankees of the American Football League (AFL) in 1937, which included briefly playing in a game that year against the Rochester Tigers before fracturing his left ankle. Mooney also worked as security for the Chicago College All-Star Game.

He reached the rank of corporal while serving in the United States Army during World War II, and was killed in action on August 12, 1944, when he was shot by a sniper in France. His last assignment was with the 110th Infantry Regiment of the 28th Infantry Division. He is buried in Plot D, Row 12, Grave 9 of the Brittany American Cemetery and Memorial.
