= Fred Foster (American football) =

American football player and track athlete (1898–1968)

Profile
- Position: Fullback

Personal information
- Born: April 25, 1898; Niagara Falls, New York, U.S.
- Died: December 19, 1968 (aged 70); Tallahassee, Florida, U.S.
- Listed height: 5 ft 11 in (1.80 m)
- Listed weight: 185 lb (84 kg)

Career information
- High school: Niagara Falls (NY)
- College: Syracuse

Career history
- Buffalo All-Americans (1923); Rochester Jeffersons (1923–1924)

Career statistics
- Games: 7
- Stats at Pro Football Reference

Frederick Frank Foster (April 25, 1898 – December 19, 1968), also known as "Fritz Foster", was an American football player and track athlete.

Foster was born in 1898 at Niagara Falls, New York. He attended Niagara Falls High School and Bethlehem Prep in Bethlehem, Pennsylvania.

Foster attended Syracuse University and played fullback for the school's freshman football team in 1919 and as the varsity fullback in 1920 and 1921. He also starred in weight events, including the "shot put", for the track team. In November 1922, the Syracuse athletic board suspended him from further athletic participation after being charged with participating in a professional football game in the Utica, New York.

Foster also played professional football in the National Football League (NFL) as a fullback during the 1923 and 1924 seasons. He began his pro football career with the Buffalo All-Americans. In his first NFL game, a November 5, 1923, a scoreless tie with Cleveland, Foster was the starting fullback and "showed well in the tasks allotted to him." He finished the 1923 NFL season with the Rochester Jeffersons. He appeared in one game for Rochester in 1923 and another five games in 1925. In all he appeared in seven NFL games, four as a starter.

Foster was married in 1921 to Margaret E. Buckley, though the marriage was kept secret until revealed by a fraternity brother in 1923. Foster died in 1967 at age 70 in Tallahassee, Florida.
