= Ray Brenner =

American football player (1898–1975)

Profile
- Positions: Wingback, halfback

Personal information
- Born: March 18, 1898; East Greenville, Ohio, U.S.
- Died: June 14, 1975 (aged 77); Massillon, Ohio, U.S.
- Listed height: 5 ft 5 in (1.65 m)
- Listed weight: 145 lb (66 kg)

Career information
- College: None

Career history
- Canton Bulldogs (1925)
- Stats at Pro Football Reference

Raymond H. Brenner (March 18, 1898 – June 14, 1975) was a professional football player who played one season in the National Football League (NFL) with the Canton Bulldogs, in 1925. He is listed by the Professional Football Researchers Association (PFRA) as being one of the smallest professional football players of all time.

Brenner also played for the Massillon Maroons, a professional football team. He later worked in construction. Brenner died on June 14, 1975, at his home in Massillon, Ohio.
