= Doc Bruder =

American football player (1901–1952)

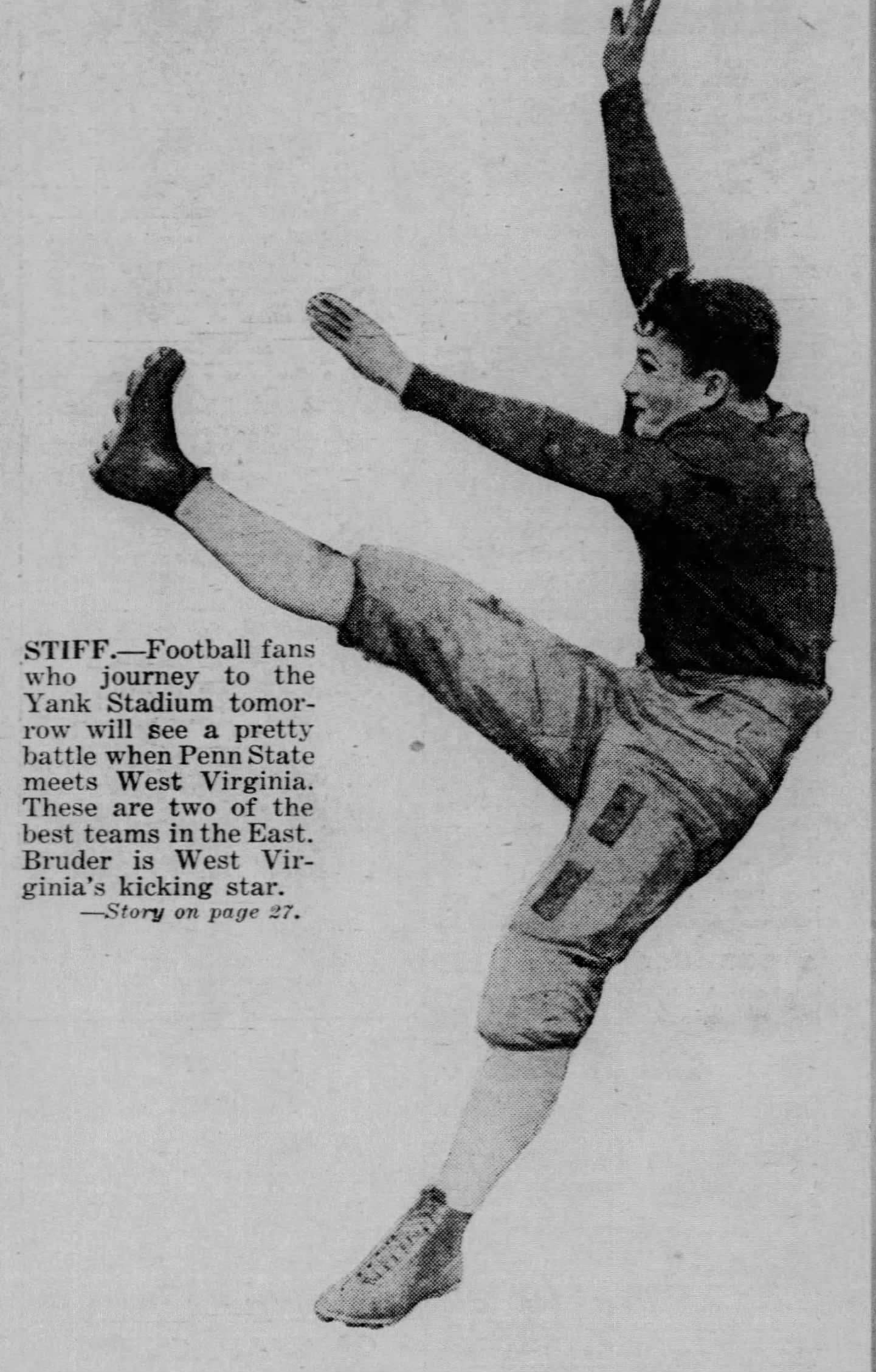
- Bruder shown in the October 26, 1923 issue of the New York Daily News

Profile
- Position: Halfback

Personal information
- Born: February 5, 1901; Houston, Texas, U.S.
- Died: November 13, 1952 (aged 51); Harris County, Texas, U.S.
- Listed height: 5 ft 11 in (1.80 m)
- Listed weight: 178 lb (81 kg)

Career information
- College: West Virginia

Career history
- Buffalo Bisons (1925); Frankford Yellow Jackets (1925–1926)

Awards and highlights
- NFL champion (1926)
- Stats at Pro Football Reference

Woodruff Harlan “Doc” Bruder (February 5, 1901 – November 13, 1952) was a professional football player for the Buffalo Bisons in 1925 and the Frankford Yellow Jackets in 1926. He played college football at Pitt and West Virginia. Bruder won the 1926 NFL championship with the Yellow Jackets.
