= Bill Edgar (American football) =

American football player (1898–1970)

Bill "Alex" Edgar
No. 17
- Position: Tackle

Personal information
- Born: September 17, 1898; Morning Sun, Iowa, U.S.
- Died: December 18, 1970 (aged 74); Butler, Pennsylvania, U.S.
- Listed height: 6 ft 2 in (1.88 m)
- Listed weight: 185 lb (84 kg)

Career information
- High school: Wilkinsburg (PA); The Kiski School
- College: Washington & Jefferson

Career history
- Buffalo All-Americans (1923); Hammond Pros (1923)
- Stats at Pro Football Reference

Alexander Willis Edgar (September 17, 1898 - December 18, 1970) was an American professional football player for the Buffalo All-Americans and the Akron Pros. He attended high school in Wilkinsburg, Pennsylvania and The Kiski School. He attended college Bucknell University, University of Pittsburgh and Washington & Jefferson College.

== See also ==
- 1923 Buffalo All-Americans season
- 1923 Akron Pros season
