= Russ Blailock =

American football player (1902–1972)

Profile
- Position: Offensive tackle / Guard

Personal information
- Born: June 29, 1902; McGregor, Texas
- Died: January 20, 1972 (aged 69); Dallas, Texas
- Listed height: 5 ft 10 in (1.78 m)
- Listed weight: 230 lb (104 kg)

Career information
- College: Baylor

Career history
- Milwaukee Badgers (1923); Akron Pros (1925)

Career NFL statistics
- Games played: 20
- Stats at Pro Football Reference

William Russell Blailock Jr. (June 29, 1902 – January 20, 1972) was an American football player in the National Football League. He first played with the Milwaukee Badgers during the 1923 NFL season. After a year away from the NFL, he played with the Akron Pros during the 1925 NFL season. He died of a heart attack in 1972.
