= Jack Underwood =

American football player (1894–1936)

Profile
- Positions: End, guard, tackle

Personal information
- Born: Stillwater, Minnesota, U.S.
- Died: Duluth, Minnesota, U.S.
- Listed height: 6 ft 0 in (1.83 m)
- Listed weight: 200 lb (91 kg)

Career information
- College: None

Career history
- Duluth Kelleys (1924–1925); Duluth Eskimos (1926); Buffalo Bisons (1927); Pottsville Maroons (1927); Chicago Cardinals (1929)
- Stats at Pro Football Reference

John Carlyle Underwood was an American professional football player born in Stillwater Minnesota. The Jack Underwood documented in "The Real Leatherheads" book claims it was John Patrick Underwood from Hinkley, MN, but that's incorrect. (I need some help with this, but the partial information I'm supplying was confirmed by the NFL Historian.) Underwood did not go to school and was delivering ice in Virginia Minnesota in the teens when he was drafted into the AEF., He played football and baseball in the AEF, and after the war in Hibbing Minnesota and Superior Wisconsin before joining the Duluth Kelley Hardware football team. He was one of four early NFL players from Virginia MN, the others being the three Rooney brothers. Underwood made his professional debut in the National Football League with the hometown Duluth Kelleys. He played for the Kelleys (later renamed the Duluth Eskimos), Chicago Cardinals, and Pottsville Maroons.
