= Earl Plank =

American football player (1905–1952)

Profile
- Position: End

Personal information
- Born: July 28, 1905; Columbus, Ohio
- Died: September 30, 1952 (aged 47); Bellefontaine, Ohio
- Listed weight: 174 lb (79 kg)

Career information
- High school: South (OH)

Career history
- Columbus Tigers (1926); Buffalo Bisons (1929); Brooklyn Dodgers (1930)
- Stats at Pro Football Reference

Earl Adam Plank (July 28, 1905 – September 30, 1952) was an American football player.

Plank was born in 1905 in Columbus, Ohio, and attended South High School.

He played three seasons in the National Football League (NFL) as an end for the Columbus Tigers in 1926, the Buffalo Bisons in 1929, and the Brooklyn Dodgers in 1930. He appeared in ten NFL games, four as a starter.

After his playing career ended, Plank operated a cafe with his two brothers in Bellefontaine, Ohio. He died in 1952 at age 47.
