= Otto Vokaty =

American football player (1909–1966)

Profile
- Position: Back

Personal information
- Born: January 17, 1909; Cleveland
- Died: August 8, 1966 (aged 57); Berea, Ohio
- Listed height: 6 ft 1 in (1.85 m)
- Listed weight: 191 lb (87 kg)

Career information
- College: Heidelberg

Career history
- Cleveland Indians (1931); New York Giants (1932); Chicago Cardinals (1933); Cincinnati Reds (1934)

Career statistics
- Rushing yards: 100
- Receiving yards: 42
- Touchdowns: 4

Otto Verne Vokaty (January 17, 1909 – August 8, 1966) was an American football player.

Vokaty played college football at Heidelberg College from 1927 to 1930. He played fullback for Heidelberg and also handled place-kicking.

Vokaty also played professional football in the National Football League (NFL) as a back for the Cleveland Indians (1931), New York Giants (1932), Chicago Cardinals (1933), and Cincinnati Reds (1934). He appeared in 18 NFL games, five as a starter. He scored four touchdowns for Cleveland in 1931. He played at the halfback position for the Giants in 1932. In July 1933, he was sold to the Chicago Cardinals for an undisclosed sum.
