= Chase Clements =

American football player (1901–1971)

George Chase Clements
Profile
- Position: Tackle

Personal information
- Born: December 31, 1901; Mount Vernon, Ohio, U.S.
- Died: August 8, 1971 (aged 69); Toledo, Ohio, U.S.
- Listed height: 6 ft 2 in (1.88 m)
- Listed weight: 205 lb (93 kg)

Career information
- College: Washington & Jefferson College

Career history
- Cleveland Bulldogs (1925); Akron Pros (1925)
- Stats at Pro Football Reference

George Chase Clements (December 31, 1901 – August 8, 1971) was an American professional football player for the Cleveland Bulldogs and the Akron Pros. He also played professional basketball for the Toledo Red Man Tobaccos. He attended Washington & Jefferson College and played for the school's basketball football teams. He was a member of the 1921 Washington & Jefferson Presidents football team that went undefeated and played in the 1922 Rose Bowl. In 1929, he moved to Toledo, Ohio and taught social studies in the Toledo City School District for 36 years. He died on August 8, 1971, at St. Luke's Hospital.
