= Charlie Zunker =

American football player (1908–1963)

- Zunker in 1934 with the Dallas Rams

No. 47, 20
- Position: Tackle

Personal information
- Born: August 23, 1908; Hanley, Texas, U.S.
- Died: June 11, 1963 (aged 54); San Antonio, Texas, U.S.
- Listed height: 6 ft 4 in (1.93 m)
- Listed weight: 227 lb (103 kg)

Career information
- High school: San Marcos (TX)
- College: Texas State

Career history
- Cincinnati Reds (1934); Dallas Rams (1934)

Career statistics
- Games played: 3
- Stats at Pro Football Reference

Charles A. Zunker (August 23, 1908 – June 11, 1963) was an American football tackle who played one season in the National Football League (NFL) for the Cincinnati Reds and one in the American Football League (AFL) for the Dallas Rams. He played college football for Texas State.

Zunker was born on August 23, 1908, in Hanley, Texas. He attended San Marcos Baptist Academy before playing college football for Texas State University. He was a member of Texas State from 1928 to 1931, being named all-conference as a senior.

Two years after graduating college, Zunker was signed to play professional football in the National Football League (NFL) by the Cincinnati Reds. He appeared in three games with the Reds before leaving for the American Football League (AFL). The Reds were one of the worst teams in the league, folding mid-season after compiling an 0–8 record. He wore number 47 with Cincinnati, and played the tackle position.

In the AFL, he appeared in eight games with the Dallas Rams while serving as team foreman. He later was a contractor and also officiated some high school football games. Zunker died on June 11, 1963, at the age of 54.
