= Hal Burt =

American football player (1900–1979)

Profile
- Position: Guard

Personal information
- Born: September 11, 1900; Eureka, Kansas, U.S.
- Died: April 17, 1979 (aged 78); Kerrville, Texas, U.S.

Career information
- College: Kansas

Career history
- 1924: Cleveland Bulldogs

Awards and highlights
- NFL champion (1924)

Harold Allan Burt (September 11, 1900 – April 17, 1979) was an American professional football player in the early National Football League (NFL) for the Cleveland Bulldogs in 1924. He played in only two games for the Bulldogs, and started at guard each time. Prior to his professional career, Burt played at the college level for the Kansas Jayhawks, under coach Potsy Clark. He served as the Jayhawks' captain in 1924. Burt died in Texas in 1979.
