= Albert Guarnieri =

American football player (1899–1980)

No. 4
- Position: End

Personal information
- Born: July 1, 1899; Ashtabula, Ohio, U.S.
- Died: April 28, 1980 (aged 80); Ashtabula, Ohio, U.S.
- Listed height: 5 ft 10 in (1.78 m)
- Listed weight: 175 lb (79 kg)

Career information
- High school: Ashtabula (OH)
- College: Notre Dame, Canisius, Niagara

Career history
- Buffalo Bisons (1924); Canton Bulldogs (1925)

Career statistics
- Games played: 12
- Stats at Pro Football Reference

George Albert "Chick" Guarnieri (July 1, 1899 – April 28, 1980) was a professional football player who played 2 seasons in the National Football League, with the Canton Bulldogs and the Buffalo Bisons. He played during the 1924 and 1925 season.
