= George Baldwin (American football) =

American football player and coach (1923–2013)

Biographical details
- Born: January 13, 1923; Exton, Pennsylvania, U.S.
- Died: July 4, 2013 (aged 90); Ormond Beach, Florida, U.S.

Playing career
- 1941–1942: Bowling Green
- 1946: Bowling Green
- Position: Guard

Coaching career (HC unless noted)
- 1948–1962: Dwight Morrow HS (NJ)
- 1973–1983: Kutztown
- 1984: New England Patriots (off. asst.)
- 1985–1987: Kutztown

Head coaching record
- Overall: 61–71–3 (college)

George H. Baldwin (January 13, 1923 – July 4, 2013) was an American football player and coach. He served as the head football coach at Kutztown University of Pennsylvania from 1973 to 1983 and again from 1985 to 1987, compiling a record of 61–71–3. Baldwin played college football at Bowling Green State University in Bowling Green, Ohio. In between his two stints at Kutztown, he spent the 1984 season as an offensive assistant for the New England Patriots of the National Football League (NFL).
