= Ray Ebli =

American football player (1919–2005)

Profile
- Position: End

Personal information
- Born: October 6, 1919; Bessemer, Michigan
- Died: January 19, 2005 (aged 85); Allouez, Wisconsin
- Listed height: 6 ft 3 in (1.91 m)
- Listed weight: 210 lb (95 kg)

Career information
- College: Notre Dame

Career history
- Chicago Cardinals (1942); Buffalo Bisons (1946); Chicago Rockets (1947)
- Stats at Pro Football Reference

Raymond Henry Ebli (October 6, 1919 – January 19, 2005) was an American football end.

Ebli was born in Bessemer, Michigan, in 1919 and attended St Ambrose High School. He played college football for Notre Dame from 1939 to 1941.

Ebli played in the National Football League for the Chicago Cardinals in 1942. He served in the Pacific with the Navy during World War II.

After the war, he played in the All-America Football Conference for the Buffalo Bisons in 1946 and the Chicago Rockets in 1947. In three seasons of professional football, Ebli appeared in 20 games, nine as a starter, and caught 12 passes for 136 yards and two touchdowns.

Ebli moved to Green Bay, Wisconsin, in 1960. With his wife Patricia, he had two sons and three daughters. He died in 2005 at Allouez, Wisconsin.
