= Alex Eagle =

American football player (1913–1999)

No. 12
- Position: Tackle

Personal information
- Born: March 19, 1913; San Francisco, California, U.S.
- Died: March 5, 1999 (aged 85); Sonoma, California, U.S.
- Listed height: 6 ft 2 in (1.88 m)
- Listed weight: 220 lb (100 kg)

Career information
- High school: Lowell (San Francisco)
- College: Oregon (1931–1934)

Career history
- Brooklyn Dodgers (1935)
- Stats at Pro Football Reference

Alexander Franklin Eagle II (March 19, 1913 – March 5, 1999) was an American professional football player who was a tackle for one season with the Brooklyn Dodgers of the National Football League (NFL). He played college football for the Oregon Ducks.

== Early life and college ==
Alexander Franklin Eagle II was born on March 19, 1913, in San Francisco, California. He attended Lowell High School in San Francisco.

He was a member of the Oregon Ducks from 1931 to 1934 and a three-year letterman from 1932 to 1934. He was an honorable mention All-American.

== Professional career ==
Eagle signed with the Brooklyn Dodgers of the National Football League on August 11, 1935. He played in ten games, starting one, for the Dodgers in 1935 as a tackle. He became a free agent after the season. He re-signed with the Dodgers on August 24, 1936, but was released later that year. Eagle wore jersey number 12 for the Dodgers. He stood 6'2" and weighed 220 pounds during his pro career.

== Personal life ==
Eagle died on March 5, 1999, in Sonoma, California.
