= Chuck Weimer =

American football player (1904–1990)

Profile
- Position: Back

Personal information
- Born: September 5, 1904; London, Ohio
- Died: April 27, 1990 (aged 85); Grove City, Ohio
- Listed height: 5 ft 9 in (1.75 m)
- Listed weight: 178 lb (81 kg)

Career information
- High school: London (OH)
- College: Wilmington

Career history
- Buffalo Bisons (1929); Brooklyn Dodgers (1930); Cleveland Indians (1931)

Howard Lee "Chuck" Weimer (September 5, 1904 – April 27, 1990) was an American football player. He played in the National Football League (NFL) as a back for the Buffalo Bisons in 1929, the Brooklyn Dodgers in 1930, and the Cleveland Indians in 1931. He appeared in 27 NFL games, 16 as a starter. In his first NFL game, Wimer ran for two touchdowns and kicked a field goal. He previously attended Wilmington College in Wilmington, Ohio, where he was a star athlete in football, basketball, baseball, and track. He also played at third base for the Dayton baseball team, and was later a player-manager for the Armco Steel Makers baseball team. He died in 1990 at Grove City, Ohio.
