= Harlan Carr =

American football and basketball player (1903–1970)

No. 3 (1927)
- Positions: Wingback, Quarterback

Personal information
- Born: April 30, 1903; Union Springs, New York
- Died: October 24, 1970 (aged 67); Auburn, New York
- Listed height: 5 ft 10 in (1.78 m)
- Listed weight: 165 lb (75 kg)

Career information
- College: Syracuse University

Career history
- Pottsville Maroons (1927); Buffalo Bisons (1927)
- Stats at Pro Football Reference

Harlan Bradley "Gotch" Carr (April 30, 1903 – October 24, 1970) was an American professional football player from Union Springs, New York. He attended Syracuse University and made his professional debut in the National Football League in 1927 with the Pottsville Maroons. He also played for the Buffalo Bisons in 1927. He scored two rushing touchdowns in ten NFL games during his 1-year career.

Harlan played basketball with Vic Hanson at Syracuse University. After his collegiate career, he also played with Vic Hanson's All-Americas pro basketball team for two seasons from 1928 to 1930.
