= Bob Mahan =

American football player (1904–2000)

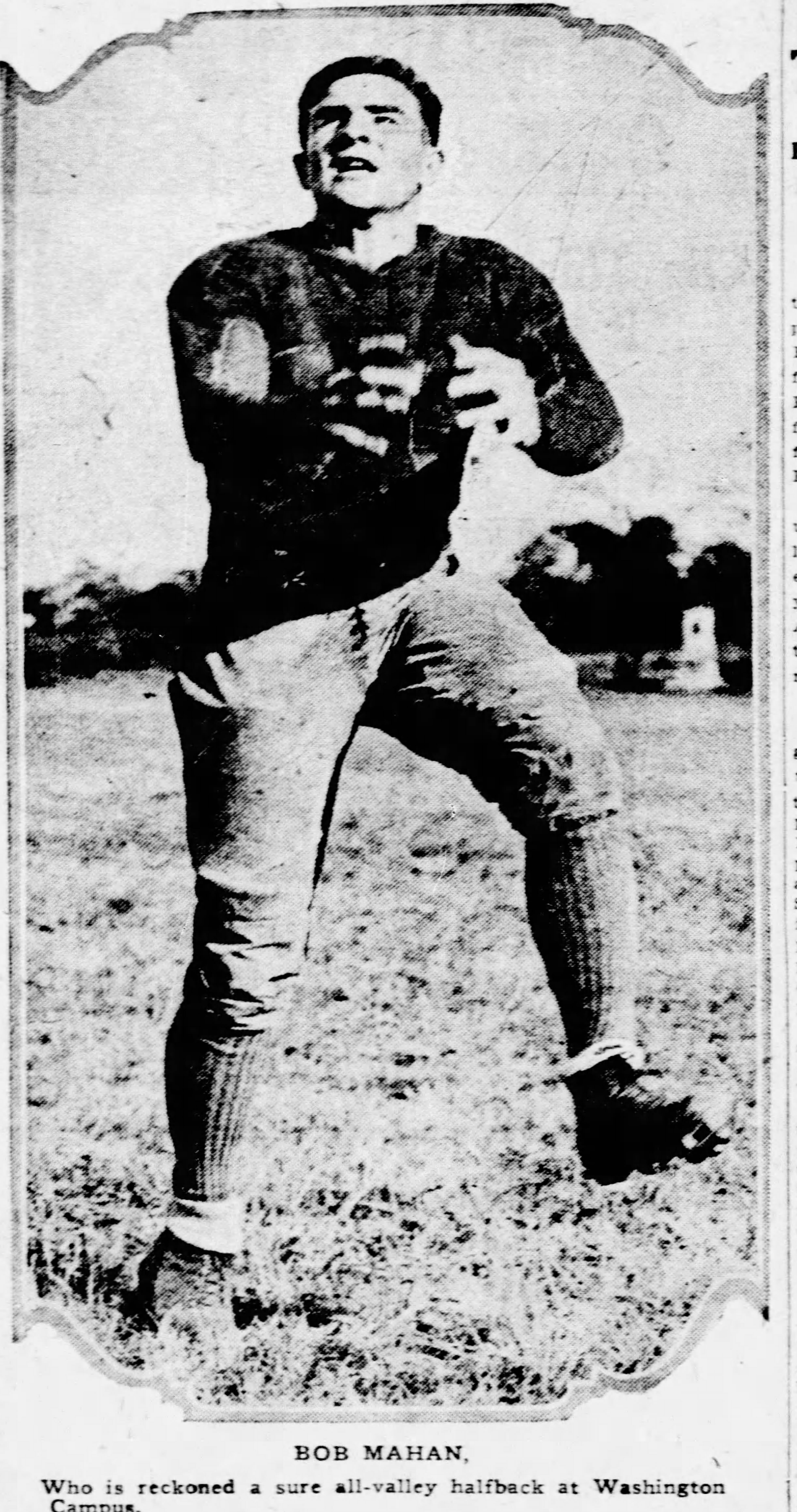
- Bob Mahan, 1925

Profile
- Positions: Back, end

Personal information
- Born: February 6, 1904; Emmetsburg, Iowa
- Died: March 5, 2000 (aged 96); Berkeley, California
- Listed height: 5 ft 9 in (1.75 m)
- Listed weight: 178 lb (81 kg)

Career information
- High school: Emmetsburg (IA)
- College: Drake University; Washington University

Career history
- Buffalo Bisons (1929); Brooklyn Dodgers (1930)

Robert Cullen Mahan (February 6, 1904 – March 5, 2000) was an American football player.

Mahan was born in 1904 in Emmetsburg, Iowa. He attended high school in Emmetsburg and then enrolled at Drake University. He played college football for Drake's freshman team in 1922 and for the varsity team in 1923. He transferred to Washington University in St. Louis where he continued to play college football from 1924 to 1926. He was selected as captain of the 1927 Washington University Bears football team.

Mahan also played professional football in the National Football League (NFL) as a fullback and halfback for the Buffalo Bisons in 1929 and as an end for the Brooklyn Dodgers in 1930. He appeared in 20 NFL games, 15 as a starter.

Mahan died in 2000 at Berkeley, California.
