= Truck Myers =

No. 7
- Position: End

Personal information
- Born: April 16, 1897; Bucyrus, Ohio, U.S.
- Died: July 19, 1969 (aged 72); Lake County, Florida, U.S.
- Listed height: 6 ft 0 in (1.83 m)
- Listed weight: 177 lb (80 kg)

Career information
- High school: Bucyrus (Bucyrus, Ohio)
- College: Ohio State (1919–1921)

Career history
- Toledo Maroons (1922); Cleveland Indians (1923); Cleveland Bulldogs (1925)

Cyril Edward "Truck" Myers (April 16, 1897 – July 19, 1969) was an American professional football end. He played college football for the Ohio State Buckeyes, where he scored the game-winning touchdown on the final play against Illinois to win the Western Conference championship in 1920, and captained the team in 1921. He later played three seasons in the National Football League (NFL) for the Toledo Maroons and Cleveland Indians/Bulldogs.
