= Hal Stotsbery =

American football player (1907–1939)

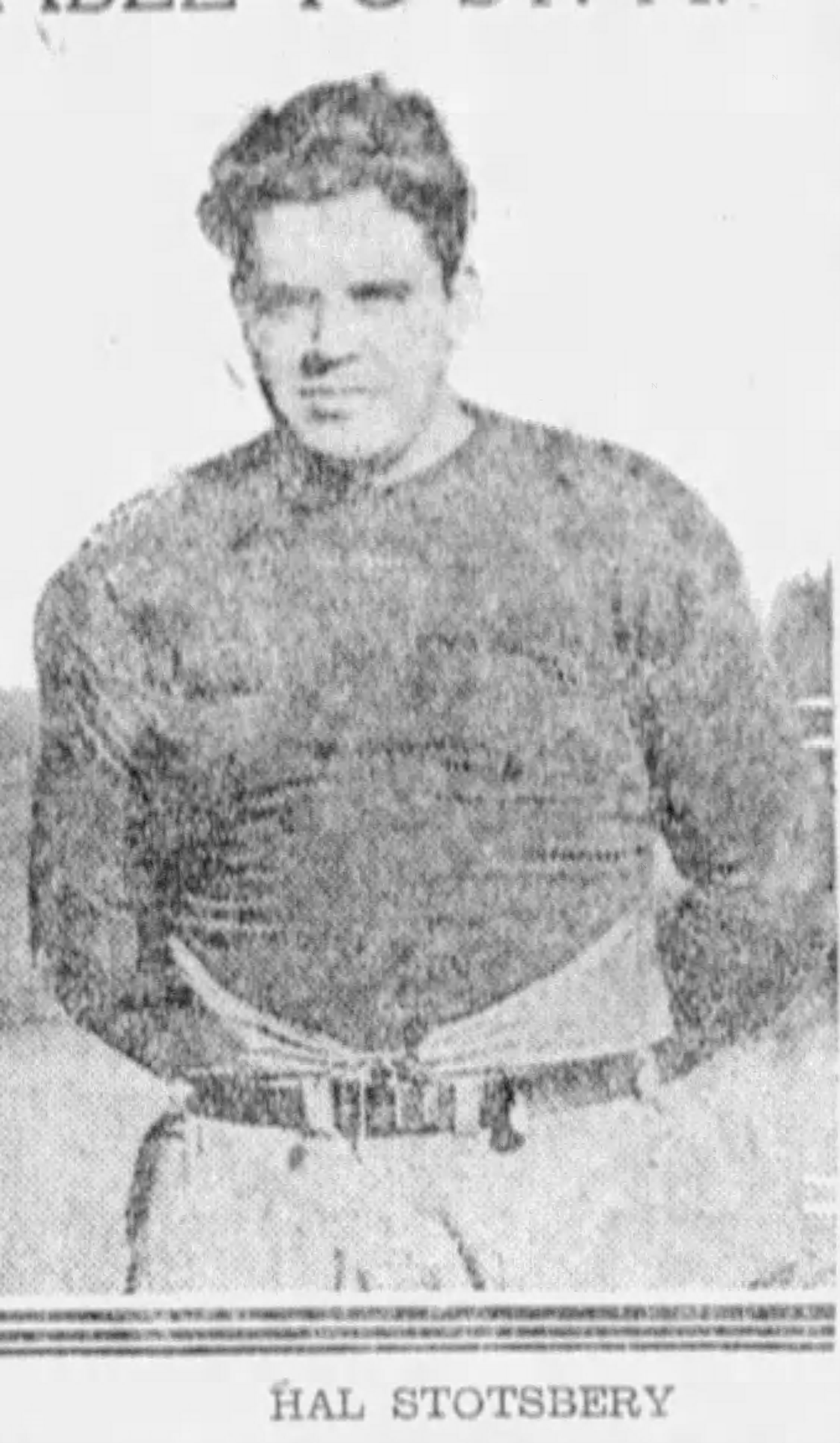
- Stotsbery, 1927

Profile
- Position: Tackle

Personal information
- Born: May 11, 1907; Belmont County, Ohio, U.S.
- Died: November 13, 1939 (aged 32)

Career information
- High school: Aquinas (OH)
- College: Xavier

Career history
- Brooklyn Dodgers (1930)

Harold Arthur "Tank" Stotsbery (May 11, 1907 – November 13, 1939) was an American football player.

Stotsbery was born in Uhrichsville, Ohio, in 1907. He attended Aquinas High School in Columbus, Ohio.

Stotsbery then attended St. Xavier College (now Xavier University) in Cincinnati. He played college football as a tackle for the St. Xavier football team from 1926 to 1929 and was selected as co-captain of the 1929 St. Xavier Musketeers football team.

Stotsbery also played professional football in the National Football League (NFL) for the Brooklyn Dodgers during the 1930 season. He appeared in two NFL games. There were reports that he also played for a professional football team in Buffalo, New York. He also played for the Columbus Bobbs of Midwest Football League in 1936.

Stotsbery died in Columbus in 1939 at age 32.
