= Isham Hardy =

American football player (1899–1983)

Profile
- Position: Guard

Personal information
- Born: March 28, 1899; Blackstone, Virginia, U.S.
- Died: January 23, 1983 (aged 83); Richmond, Virginia, U.S.
- Listed height: 5 ft 9 in (1.75 m)
- Listed weight: 185 lb (84 kg)

Career information
- College: William & Mary

Career history
- Akron Pros (1923); Akron Indians (1926)

Career NFL statistics
- Games played: 3
- Stats at Pro Football Reference

Isham Trotter Hardy (March 28, 1899 – January 23, 1983) was an American professional football player for the National Football League's Akron Pros and Akron Indians. He played in a total of three games between the 1923 and 1926 seasons after his collegiate career at William & Mary.

Hardy was later a dentist in Newport News before retiring in 1972.
