= Leo Tobin =

American football player (1890–1952)

Profile
- Positions: Guard, Linebacker

Personal information
- Born: November 25, 1890; Roscoe, Pennsylvania, U.S.
- Died: November 29, 1952 (aged 62); Pinellas County, Florida, U.S.
- Listed height: 5 ft 9 in (1.75 m)
- Listed weight: 220 lb (100 kg)

Career information
- High school: California (PA)
- College: Grove City

Career history
- Akron Pros (1921)
- Stats at Pro Football Reference

Lehman John "Leo" Tobin (November 25, 1890 – November 29, 1952) was an American football player who played one season for the Akron Pros. He played with his brother Elgie Tobin in 1921, his only season.

Leo Tobin was born on November 25, 1890, in Roscoe, Pennsylvania. He went to high school at California (PA) and to college at Grove City. According to pro football archives, he played in one game in the Akron Pros' championship in 1920, but he was not listed on their roster in other sources. In 1921, he played in between 9 and 12 games. He was 5 feet, 9 inches tall, and weighed 220 pounds. His only statistic was one extra point scored. His brother Elgie Tobin was the head coach of the Pros in 1920 and 21. Tobin died on November 29, 1952, at the age of 62, it was 5 days after his 62nd birthday.
