= Bob Perina =

American football player (1921–1991)

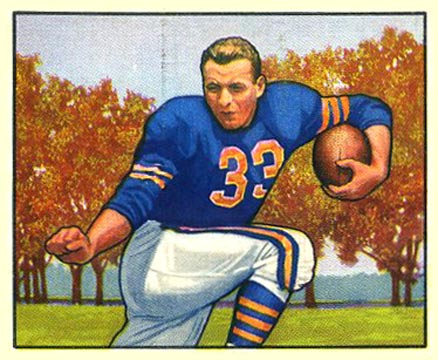
- Perina on a 1950 Bowman football card

Profile
- Position: Running back/Quarterback/defensive back

Personal information
- Born: January 16, 1921; Irvington, New Jersey, U.S.
- Died: August 2, 1991 (aged 70); Madison, Wisconsin, U.S.

Career information
- College: Princeton

Career history
- New York Yankees (1946); Brooklyn Dodgers (1947); Chicago Rockets (1948); Chicago Bears (1949); Baltimore Colts (1950)

Career statistics
- Rushing yards: 256
- Touchdowns: 5
- Interceptions: 18
- Stats at Pro Football Reference

Robert Ian Perina (January 16, 1921 – August 2, 1991) was an American football running back, quarterback and defensive back in the National Football League (NFL). He played for the New York Yankees, Brooklyn Dodgers, Chicago Rockets, Chicago Bears, and Baltimore Colts. He played college football for the Princeton Tigers.
