= Chief Toorock =

American football player (1902–1964)

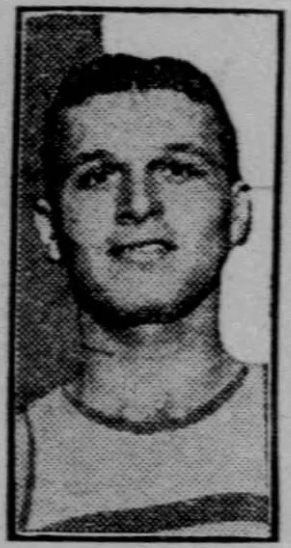
- Toorock, circa 1923

No. 15
- Position: Wingback

Personal information
- Born: March 14, 1902; New York City, U.S.
- Died: December 22, 1964 (aged 62)
- Listed height: 5 ft 9 in (1.75 m)
- Listed weight: 180 lb (82 kg)

Career information
- High school: Evander Childs (The Bronx)
- College: NYU

Career history
- Brooklyn Lions (1926)
- Stats at Pro Football Reference

Meyer "Chief" Toorock (March 14, 1902 – December 22, 1964) was an American athlete. He played college baseball, basketball, and football at New York University. He played professional football for the Brooklyn Lions of the National Football League (NFL).

== Early life ==
Meyer Toorock was born on March 14, 1902, in New York City. He attended Evander Childs High School in The Bronx.

== College career ==
Toorock played college baseball, basketball, and football at New York University (NYU). In spring 1922, he was the shortstop for the baseball team but took over as the starting catcher for the remainder of the season after the former catcher became injured. He was also a guard on the basketball team. Toorock had never played football at any level until he joined the Violets for the 1922 season. On October 11, 1922, he became the team's new starting fullback due to the former starter having suffered an injury. Toorock was the only NYU athlete to earn three varsity letters that year. He was a star player for the Violets during the 1923 football season.

== Professional career ==
In February 1926, Toorock signed with the New York Hebrews semi-pro baseball team. On September 23, 1926, he signed with the Brooklyn Lions of the National Football League (NFL). He played in either one or two games for the Lions during the 1926 NFL season.

== Personal life ==
Toorock died on December 22, 1964.
