= Giff Zimmerman =

American football player (1900–1968)

No. 1
- Positions: Wingback, Tailback

Personal information
- Born: August 25, 1900; Akron, Ohio
- Died: November 27, 1968 (aged 68); Manatee County, Florida
- Listed height: 5 ft 10 in (1.78 m)
- Listed weight: 180 lb (82 kg)

Career information
- College: Syracuse

Career history
- Akron Pros (1924); Canton Bulldogs (1925)

Awards and highlights
- Syracuse Orange No. 44 retired
- Stats at Pro Football Reference

Gifford Guy Zimmerman (August 25, 1900 – November 27, 1968) was a professional football player who played two seasons in the National Football League, with the Akron Pros and the Canton Bulldogs. In 1926, he scored two touchdowns with the Bulldogs. Prior to playing in the NFL, Zimmerman played college football and college basketball at Syracuse University. He played forward for the Syracuse basketball team for two seasons. On the football field, Giff was a 3-time letterman, playing wingback, tailback and kicker for the 1921, 1922, and 1923 Syracuse football seasons. While at Syracuse, he was also on the track team and president of the Syracuse student body.
