= Dane Dastillung =

American football player (1897–1982)

Profile
- Positions: Guard, tackle

Personal information
- Born: April 2, 1897; Cincinnati, Ohio, U.S.
- Died: November 30, 1982 (aged 85); Cincinnati, Ohio, U.S.
- Listed height: 6 ft 0 in (1.83 m)
- Listed weight: 190 lb (86 kg)

Career information
- College: Marietta, St. Xavier

Career history
- Cincinnati Celts (1921)

Career NFL statistics
- Games played: 4
- Games started: 3
- Stats at Pro Football Reference

Harry "Dane" Dastillung (April 2, 1897 – November 30, 1982) was an American professional football lineman who played one season with the Cincinnati Celts of the American Professional Football Association (APFA). He played college football at Marietta College and St. Xavier College.

== Early life and college ==
Harry Dastillung was born on April 2, 1897, in Cincinnati, Ohio. He first played college football for the Marietta Pioneers of Marietta College. He then transferred to play for the St. Xavier Saints of St. Xavier College.

== Professional career ==
Dastillung signed with the Cincinnati Celts of the American Professional Football Association in 1921. He played in all four league games, starting three, for the Celts in 1921. The Celts finished the season with a 1–3 record in league games. Dastillung was a tackle and guard during his time with the Celts. He stood 6'0" and weighed 190 pounds. He was released in 1921.

== Personal life ==
Dastillung served in the United States Navy. He died on November 30, 1982, in Cincinnati.
