= George Buksar =

American football player (1926–2011)

No. 70, 77, 39
- Positions: Linebacker, fullback

Personal information
- Born: August 12, 1926; St. Joseph, Michigan, U.S.
- Died: February 22, 2011 (aged 84); Solon, Ohio, U.S.
- Listed height: 6 ft 0 in (1.83 m)
- Listed weight: 206 lb (93 kg)

Career information
- High school: George Rogers Clark (Whiting, Indiana)
- College: Purdue (1946); San Francisco (1947–1948)
- NFL draft: 1951: 24th round, 286th overall pick

Career history
- Chicago Hornets (1949); Baltimore Colts (1950); Washington Redskins (1951–1952)

Career NFL/AAFC statistics
- Rushing yards: 63
- Rushing average: 2.3
- Receptions: 4
- Receiving yards: 5
- Interceptions: 7
- Total touchdowns: 1
- Stats at Pro Football Reference

George Benjamin Buksar (August 12, 1926 – February 22, 2011) was an American professional football fullback and linebacker in the National Football League (NFL) for the Washington Redskins and the Baltimore Colts. He also played for the Chicago Hornets of the All-America Football Conference (AAFC). Buksar played college football at Purdue University and the University of San Francisco and was drafted in the tenth round of the 1949 NFL draft by the Los Angeles Rams.
