= Deke Edler =

American football player and coach (1897–1953)

Biographical details
- Born: August 29, 1897; Galion, Ohio, U.S.
- Died: June 1, 1953 (aged 55); Peoria, Illinois, U.S.

Playing career

Football
- 1919–1922: Ohio Wesleyan
- 1923: Cleveland Indians
- Positions: Halfback, wingback

Coaching career (HC unless noted)

Football
- 1928: Heidelberg (assistant)
- 1929–1934: Otterbein

Basketball
- 1925–1928: Otterbein

Head coaching record
- Overall: 21–24–4 (football); 21–15 (basketball)

Robert Karl "Deke" Edler (August 29, 1897 – June 1, 1953) was an American football player and coach. He played for one season for the Cleveland Indians of the National Football League (NFL), in 1923. Edler served as the head football coach at Otterbein College—now known as Otterbein University—from 1929 to 1934, compiling a record of 21–24–4.

== Head coaching record ==
=== Football ===
Year	Team	Overall	Conference	Standing	Bowl/playoffs
Otterbein Cardinals (Ohio Athletic Conference) (1929–1934)
1929	Otterbein	3–5	3–5	12th	
1930	Otterbein	4–3–1	3–2	5th	
1931	Otterbein	5–3	5–1	4th	
1932	Otterbein	4–2–2	4–2–2	7th	
1933	Otterbein	3–4–1	3–3–1	T–9th	
1934	Otterbein	2–7	2–4	T–16th	
Otterbein:		21–24–4	20–17–3		
Total:		21–24–1			
