= Rex Thomas =

American football player (1902–1955)

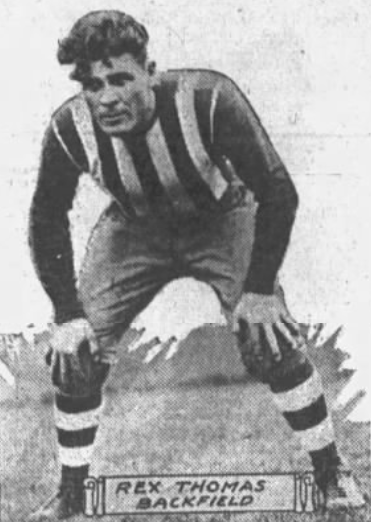

Profile
- Position: Wide receiver

Personal information
- Born: April 16, 1902; McLoud, Oklahoma, U.S.
- Died: March 28, 1955 (aged 52) near Sterling, Colorado, U.S.

Career information
- College: University of Tulsa

Career history
- 1926: Brooklyn Lions
- 1927: Cleveland Bulldogs
- 1928: Detroit Wolverines
- 1930–1931: Brooklyn Dodgers

Rex Beauford Thomas (April 16, 1902 – March 28, 1955) was an American professional football player who was a wide receiver for five seasons for the Brooklyn Lions, Cleveland Bulldogs, Detroit Wolverines, and Brooklyn Dodgers. He later lived in Sterling, Colorado where he worked in the oilfield industry. Rex married Cleo Geyer and had 2 children; Rex Buford Thomas, Jr born August 1, 1925 and Joann Thomas. Thomas was killed in an automobile collision on March 28, 1955, near Sterling.
