= 1933 Cincinnati Reds (NFL) season =

Defunct NFL team season

1933 Cincinnati Reds season
- Owner: Cincinnati Professional Football Club, Inc.
- President: M. Scott Kearns
- Head coach: Al Jolley with Mike Palm
- Home stadium: Redland Field

Results
- Record: 3–6–1 (NFL); 6–6–1 (overall)
- Division place: 4th NFL Western
- Playoffs: Did not qualify

The 1933 Cincinnati Reds season was their inaugural season in the National Football League (NFL). The team started 0–5-1, suffering shutouts in 5 of the first 6 games, before winning 3 of 4 down the stretch to finish the year with a record of 3 wins, 6 losses, and 1 tie.

The Reds were a completely new franchise, started from the ground up by Hamilton County coroner M. Scott Kearns, a local football fan eager to capitalize on professional football's growing popularity, heading a small circle of like-minded local investors.

The Reds had one of the most anemic offenses in the history of the NFL, marking the nadir to set records for fewest yards gained, fewest first downs, fewest passing attempts, and fewest passing touchdowns in a season. The 1933 Reds scored only three touchdowns all year, also still an NFL record. Cincinnati also seems to have played host to the smallest paid crowd in league history when approximately 300 fans braved a steady drizzle to watch the team be shut out by the Philadelphia Eagles on November 5, 6–0. The Reds as a team only completed 25 passes, only eight more than the 1932 Boston Braves, who had 17 completions.

== Background ==
Dr. Michael Scott Kearns (1899–1940), a former player at Xavier University, was primary organizer of the NFL Reds club.

Cincinnati's admission into the National Football League (NFL) in 1933 marked the second time the city had been represented in the circuit. In 1921 the Cincinnati Celts had played an eight game schedule, losing all eight, and ignominiously dropped out of the league.

The Reds were a new franchise created from the ground-up in 1933, with the syndicate of prominent Cincinnatians behind the project headed by Dr. M. Scott Kearns, Hamilton County coroner, a former collegiate player and long-time football fan.

"Professional football has been growing by leaps and bounds all over the country and we want Cincinnati to be on the pro map," Kearns told a local reporter in June 1933. "We are now negotiating with several well-known coaches to handle the team," Kearns added, further indicating that "good" players were being sought as well, with signings planned prior to the NFL owners meeting to be held in Chicago the weekend of July 8–9.

Kearns was bullish on the chances of the new club in the NFL. "We have plenty of money and we do not intend to chisel," he said. "I think I can guarantee that the Cincinnati Reds — that will be the name of the team — will be able to hold their own against Portsmouth, Green Bay, Chicago, Staten Island, and the rest of the pack."

The July 1933 scheduling meeting welcomed Cincinnati to the NFL together with two new entries — the Philadelphia Eagles and the Pittsburgh Pirates (later changing their name to the Steelers). Kearns, speaking as representative of the Reds at the league meeting, announced the selection of Al "Rocky" Jolley as head coach — formerly boss of the 1–7–1 1929 Buffalo Bisons. The team added 34-year old quarterback Myron "Mike" Palm, a little-used member of the 1925 and 1926 New York Giants, as a player-coach on July 14, completing the team's coaching staff.

On July 22, a new ownership entity called Cincinnati Professional Football Club, Inc. was recognized by the state of Ohio, capitalized with stock in two classes — 300 shares of common stock with a par value of $10 per share, and 200 shares of preferred stock returning a 6% rate of interest, with a par value of $100 per share.

Former collegiate players were signed to the club throughout the summer, with 17 already under contract in mid-August.

Team secretary William McCoy announced that the Friarhurst retreat in Cincinnati had been reserved for a training camp, which was scheduled to begin September 3. The club's home opener at Redland Field was slated for October 8, McCoy announced, to be preceded by an aggressive slate exhibition games planned against Indianapolis, Fort Wayne, and Dayton ahead of the regular season opener against the NFL expansion Pittsburgh Pirates. In actuality, it seems that only a free intersquad game at Cincinnati's Avoco Park on September 10 was held.

== Schedule ==
Game	Date	Opponent	Result	Record	Venue	Attendance	Recap	Sources
—	September 13	at Pittsburgh Pirates	**Postponed due to rain**					
1	September 17	at **Portsmouth Spartans**	**L** 0–21	0–1	Universal Stadium	5,000	Recap	
—	September 24	at Troy (OH) Flyers	**W** 59–0	—	Troy Athletic Park	3,000	—	
—	October 1	at Memphis Tigers	**W** 17–0	—	Hodges Field	1,500	—	
2	October 8	**Chicago Cardinals**	**L** 0–3	0–2	Redland Field	1,500	Recap	
3	October 11	at Pittsburgh Pirates	**L** 3–17	0–3	Forbes Field	5,000	Recap	
4	October 15	at Brooklyn Dodgers	**L** 0–27	0–4	Ebbets Field	12,000	Recap	
5	October 22	Pittsburgh Pirates	**T** 0–0	0–4–1	Redland Field	900	Recap	
—	October 29	at St. Louis Gunners	**W** 7–0	—	Public Schools Stadium	6,350	—	
6	November 5	Philadelphia Eagles	**L** 0–6	0–5–1	Redland Field	300	Recap	
7	November 12	at **Chicago Cardinals**	**W** 12–9	1–5–1	Wrigley Field	7,000	Recap	
8	November 19	**Portsmouth Spartans**	**W** 10–7	2–5–1	Redland Field	7,500	Recap	
9	November 26	at Philadelphia Eagles	**L** 3–20	2–6–1	Baker Bowl	10,000	Recap	
10	December 3	Brooklyn Dodgers	**W** 10–0	3–6–1	Redland Field	3,500	Recap	
Note: Intra-division opponents are in **bold** text. Non-league opponent in italics.

== Season recap ==
After seeing their season opener at Pittsburgh postponed for a month by rain, Cincinnati Reds debuted inauspiciously, traveling to Portsmouth, Ohio for a September 17 match-up with the Portsmouth Spartans. The contest was one-sided, with the Reds cracking midfield only one time and never threatening to score, losers on a hot day by a score of 21–0.

The club filled two free Sundays in their early schedule with exhibition games against lesser opponents, including a 59–0 whitewashing of a semi-pro team from Troy, Ohio — a "workout" in which the Reds were able to use every single player on their 25-man roster. The two easy victories, by a combined score of 76–0, were a high point of an otherwise dismal year.

It would be three weeks between NFL opponents, but finally the day arrived — the Reds' home opener against the oldest team in the league, the Chicago Cardinals. Not for the last time, weather would be a factor, with the start of the game delayed 20 minutes by a torrential downpour, with the size of the crowd held to 1,500 by the meteorological unpleasantness. Once again the Reds would fail to score, with halfback Joe Lillard out of the University of Oregon — characterized by the local press as a "giant Negro" despite his quite mortal stature of 6'0" and 185 pounds — the star of the game. It would be a Lillard field goal that would provide all the scoring in another shutout loss for Cincinnati, 3–0.

Even bad teams had stars: halfback "Jarring Jim" Bausch and blocking back Algy Clark of the 1933 Cincinnati Reds.

The October 22 home game against Pittsburgh was again played in the rain and ended in an entirely appropriate 0–0 tie — memorable only as a punting extravaganza. The two teams combined to boot the ball skyward an NFL record 31 times in the contest, with the Redlegs setting winning the punting battle, at least, 17 to 14. Only the fact that the Chicago Bears and Green Bay Packers found themselves in the same weather situation on the same day with the same 31 punt result has kept the Reds from sitting atop alone the record book in this dubious category.

The biggest crowd of the season would see the Reds' biggest loss, as Benny Friedman of the Brooklyn Dodgers hit his teammate John "Shipwreck" Kelly for two touchdown passes in a 27–0 loss at Ebbets Field. The coach of the Dodgers, John McEwan, sat on the ball to avoid running up the score after the four-score lead was achieved.

Jack Miley of the New York Daily News was frankly not impressed with the cut of the Redlegs' jib, characterizing the visiting squad as "eleven portly and puffing old fellows from Cincinnati, whose bright college years were deeply dimmed by the mists of time," who "handle themselves as helplessly on the gridiron as do their townsmen, the [cellar-dwelling] Cincinnati Reds on the diamond." They presented "soft picking, indeed" for the Dodgers, Miley declared.

But things managed to get worse. On November 5, the Reds seem to have been host to one of the smallest crowds in NFL history, when under a steady rain fewer than 500 partisans assembled at Redland Field to watch another shutout loss, this time 6–0 to an only-slightly-less-hapless expansion team, the Philadelphia Eagles. Coming on the heels of a previous loss-in-the-rain before just 900 fans in the Cardinals game, one feels sorry for the entire franchise for the dismal local news coverage the game generated. The reporter of the Cincinnati Enquirer wrote: "The game, played in a constant drizzle, was devoid of any outstanding plays, and, on most occasions, the slow underfooting nullified the teams' progress to such extent that they [punted] on second or third down."

The loss to the Eagles capped a first phase of the season in which the Reds went 0–5–1, and were outscored by their opponents 74 to 3.

Fortunes changed for the club on November 12, with Cincinnati visiting the Chicago Cardinals at Wrigley Field. On the third play from scrimmage, Cincinnati back Lew Pope popped off a 46-yard touchdown run, and despite a 0-for-2 passing day the Reds would hold on to win, 12–9. They would finish the season winning three games out of four, posting victories over the Portsmouth Spartans — a franchise soon to be sold and moved to Detroit — and a rematch with the Brooklyn Dodgers.

The final game against Brooklyn was a highpoint of the season for Reds fans, when 5'6" halfback Gilbert "Frenchy" LeFebvre ran back a punt 98 yards for one of the three touchdowns Cincinnati would score in the 1933 season. The Reds beat the Dodgers at home, 10 to 0.

== Standings ==
NFL Western Division
	W	L	T	PCT	DIV	PF	PA	STK
Chicago Bears	10	2	1	.833	7–0	133	82	W4
Portsmouth Spartans	6	5	0	.545	3–4	128	87	L3
Green Bay Packers	5	7	1	.417	2–4	170	107	L1
Cincinnati Reds	3	6	1	.333	2–2	38	110	W1
Chicago Cardinals	1	9	1	.100	1–5	52	101	T1

Note: Tie games were not officially counted in the standings until 1972.

== NFL records ==
The National Football League began collecting and retaining game statistics only in 1932. Consequently, the league's official records start only from this point, perhaps accidentally absolving the miserable seasons of one or more pioneering teams. With that fact acknowledged, the 1933 Cincinnati Reds managed to set a number of league records for futility that remain on the books nearly a century later.

In addition to their informal record for smallest paid crowd at an NFL game (about 300), the 1933 Reds continue to hold official NFL records for Fewest Yards Gained in a Season (1,150), Fewest First Downs in a Season (51), Fewest Points Scored in a Full Season (38), Fewest Touchdowns Scored in a Season (3), Fewest Passes Attempted in a Season (102), Fewest Passes Completed in a Season (25), Fewest Touchdown Passes in a season (0), as well as Most Punts in a Game (17).

None of these records seem likely to be broken by a team in the modern era of the NFL, insuring a unique place for the 1933 Cincinnati Reds in league history.

== Roster ==
Cincinnati's guards of 1933 (left to right): Lester "Wimpy" Caywood, Tom Blondin, Hilary "Biff" Lee, Ross "Rosie" Grant.

Ends

- Chuck Braidwood
- Joe Crakes ‡
- Hal Hilpirt †
- Jim Mooney ‡
- Dick Powell †
- Kermit Schmidt
- Cookie Tackwell

Tackles

- Lloyd Burdick †‡
- John Burleson
- Sonny Doell
- Leo Draveling
- George Munday †‡

Guards

- Tom Blondin
- Les "Wimpy" Caywood †‡
- Rosie Grant
- Biff Lee †‡

Centers

- Frank Abruzzino †
- Mil Berner
- John Rogers ‡

Blocking Backs

- Algy Clark ‡
- Don Moses
- Lee "Brute" Mulleneaux †
- Bill Senn
- Ossie Wiberg

Halfbacks

- "Jarring Jim" Bausch
- Fait Elkins †
- Gil LeFebvre
- Mike Palm ‡
- Seaman "Cob" Squyres
- Blake Workman †

Fullbacks

- Lester "Red" Corzine ‡
- Lew Pope †‡

† — denotes Game 1 starter; ‡ — denotes Game 10 starter.
