= American Football League (1934) =

- Sport: American football
- Founded: 1934
- First season: 1934
- Folded: 1934
- No. of teams: 6
- Country: United States
- Status: Disbanded
- Last champion: St. Louis/Kansas City Blues

The 1934 edition of the American Football League was a short-lived professional American football minor league with teams based in the American South and Southwest. The first of several minor leagues with the same name, the 1934 was also one of the first involving teams not located in the American Midwest and East. While its membership was the cornerstone of American football in the southern U.S. (with several having beaten National Football League teams on the gridiron), the AFL had only one season of competition and folded after cancelling competition in the 1935 season.

== Participating teams ==
Charlotte Bantams. Formed in 1932 and playing primarily teams based along the Atlantic Coast, the Bantams amassed a 10–3 record in 1933.

Dallas Rams. Founded in 1933 with the expressed purpose of joining the new AFL as a natural rival of teams in Oklahoma City and Houston, the Rams played only three games that year. One unique fact about the Rams was that as of November 1934, they were owned by a woman: Glyma Orr, identified in print as "a young society woman" from Dallas, who had also been a former head cheerleader and was a devoted football fan. When not running the team, she ran a school of dramatic arts. The press reported that she was believed to be the first woman to ever own a football team.

Louisville Bourbons. Founded in 1931, the Bourbons played primarily against opponents in the Midwest, including the Portsmouth Spartans of the NFL.

Memphis Tigers. Formed in 1927 as "New Bry’s Hurricanes" and renamed in 1928, the Tigers were the dominant football team of the South from 1929 to 1932. In 1929, Memphis defeated the Green Bay Packers 20–7 (the Packers eventually won the 1929 NFL championship without losing a league game).

St. Louis Blues. Formed by the league after the St. Louis Gunners rejected the league's overtures for membership. Sports promoter Bud Yates was credited with founding the team after being general manager for the 1926–27 St. Louis Blues independent team (which lost only one game in its two-season existence). and founding crosstown rivals St. Louis Gunners (in 1931) and St. Louis Veterans (in 1932). When the Gunners joined the NFL in November 1934, the Blues moved to Kansas City.

Tulsa Oilers. Formed in late 1933 as the Tulsa Drillers, the team played (and lost) only three games that season (two against Oklahoma City, one against the St. Louis Gunners). Coached by Billy Boehm, the team featured former members of the University of Tulsa football team.

=== Teams who joined the league but were forced out ===
Oklahoma City Chiefs. Formed in 1932, the Chiefs lost only one game in their inaugural year (to Portsmouth) and continued their success in 1933 as they staked their claim as being one of the two strongest minor league teams (along with the St. Louis Gunners). Because their home stadium could seat only 2000 people, the league dropped the Chiefs when the team's efforts to secure a "suitable" stadium failed. The team ceased to exist two months later.

Houston. Having joined the league despite not having a team organization or player roster, Houston was dropped when Oklahoma City was given the boot. The team never came into existence.

== Origin of league ==
After the collapse of the first American Football League and the paring of ten teams from the NFL after the 1926 season, professional American football was concentrated in the American Midwest and Northeast. The Memphis Tigers developed into a strong independent football team, comparable to those based in Ohio and Pennsylvania.

In 1929, a Memphis team that was temporarily enhanced by the addition of Ken Strong and several other NFL players defeated the Green Bay Packers. The victory prompted Tigers owner Clarence Saunders to claim the "national pro championship." Memphis was not seriously challenged by non-NFL teams in 1930, but in 1931, promoter Bud Yates founded the St. Louis Gunners with future Hall of Fame member Jimmy Conzelman as the team's coach. After a respectable 5–2–1 record in 1931 (playing all of its games at Public Schools Stadium in St. Louis), the Gunners changed coaches (to Bullet Baker) and played a more ambitious schedule in 1932, playing the Tigers to one win, one loss, and one tie – a November 27, 1932, game between the two teams was billed as for the "independent pro championship" ended with a 0–0 score.

The 1931 season saw the start of the Louisville Bantams, which played most of the games in its inaugural season against teams based in Ohio (including the Ironton Tanks); the following season saw the formation of the Charlotte Bantams and the Oklahoma City Chiefs. By 1933, both Charlotte and Oklahoma City were not only able to compete toe-to-toe with Memphis and the St. Louis Gunners, but both dominated the Tigers in three out of four games that year.

On November 14, 1933, Memphis Tigers owner S. A. Goodman, boasting that the Tigers have been playing "as good football as in the NFL" and that St. Louis and Oklahoma City "could win… in the NFL at any time," announced plans for a new major football league, which he named the American Football League. In the three weeks after the announcement, the Gunners defeated NFL teams in successive games and a new team in Tulsa, the Drillers, came into being and played competitively against Oklahoma City and St. Louis, losing all three of their games.

== Formation ==
In 1933, Goodman stated "We don’t want a Southern league, nor a secondary league." Yet by the summer of 1934, his new league was to have teams representing Memphis (Tigers), St. Louis (Gunners), Oklahoma City (Chiefs), Tulsa (the newly renamed Oilers), Charlotte (Bantams), Louisville (Bourbons), Dallas, and Houston. Even then, plans for the league had to be altered as neither Dallas nor Houston had organized teams at that point... and the Gunners did not want to join the embryonic league as they had aspirations for joining the NFL (in fact, the team bought the NFL's Cincinnati Reds franchise for $20,000 on August 8, 1934, but the sale was vetoed by the NFL team owners).

In August, Oklahoma City was expelled from the league because their home stadium (a minor league baseball park) could hold only 2000 people in the grandstands (the Chiefs would continue as an independent team for two more months before folding); at the same time, Houston was dropped from the lineup as there was no progress in organizing a football team in time for the start of the season. On the other hand, Dallas was successful in forming a new team, the Rams. Also in August, Bud Yates (founder of the St. Louis Gunners in 1931 and the St. Louis Veterans in 1932) was enlisted to organize a third St. Louis team, this time called the St. Louis Blues, which featured former Gunners Dick Frahm and John Breidenstein.

== Competition and dissolution ==
By October 7, 1934, the day of the league's first games, the AFL settled on a double round robin schedule, with each team scheduled to play one road game and one home game against each of the other members of the league. Despite the league's intention, only Memphis and Charlotte managed to play the full ten games as weather forced the cancellation of several games.

Final league standings – 1934

Team	W	L	T	Pct.	PF	PA
St. Louis/Kansas City Blues	7	0	1	.937	161	40
Memphis Tigers	5	3	2	.600	94	76
Louisville Bourbons	5	3	0	.625	76	70
Dallas Rams	3	6	0	.333	65	105
Charlotte Bantams	3	7	0	.300	81	122
Tulsa Oilers	1	5	1	.214	28	92

By late October, the Blues' supremacy was virtually conceded as St. Louis was not only dominating each of its games but also outdrawing the Gunners, which had to cobble together a schedule after the rejection by the NFL and the reduction of availability of AFL members for scheduled football games. When the Gunners’ purchase of the Cincinnati Reds was finally approved by the NFL, Blues' ownership decided not to compete with the newest member of the National Football League and opted to move across the state of Missouri, to Kansas City, one-time home of the NFL's Kansas City Blues and Kansas City Cowboys. After the move, the former St. Louis Blues became the new Kansas City Blues.

The St. Louis/Kansas City Blues ran roughshod through the league, with only a tie with Memphis marring its won-lost record with a late-season tie. On December 16, 1934, the Blues finally met the Gunners for the first (and only) time, with the NFL team prevailing 7–0 before it was disbanded due to unpaid tax debts (a new St. Louis Gunners team would surface by later 1935, again as an independent).

Preparations for the 1935 season saw the Blues returning to St. Louis after the Gunners' dissolution and Louisville playing exhibition games in September, but none of the other league members had bothered to assemble their squads, including the Tigers, which were sited in the league's home city, Memphis. S. A. Goodman, both the president of the AFL and the owner of the Tigers, announced on September 26, 1935, that due to "lateness in organizing", the 1935 AFL season was cancelled, but the league would return in 1936.

St. Louis and Louisville played four games in front of diminishing crowds before folding; the Memphis squad was tentatively put together by two longtime Tigers (Red Clavette and Cliff Norvell) and bankrolled by Wilson Murrah. While the team managed to play three games (scoring 100 points in the process), the writing was on the wall: the Tigers (and any possibility of the AFL returning in 1936) winked out of existence.

== All-League teams ==
Despite the AFL's existing for only one season, it had two All-League teams, one selected by Associated Press writers in the cities represented by the AFL teams and one selected by the coaches of the American Football League.

=== Associated Press All-AFL team ===
- End: Dutch Kreuter, Charlotte
- End: Burle Robison, Memphis
- Tackle: Jess Tinsley, Louisville
- Tackle: Hugh Rhea, St. Louis/Kansas City
- Guard: Win Croft, St. Louis/Kansas City
- Guard: Gordon Reddick, Charlotte
- Center: Popeye Wager, Louisville
- Quarterback: George Grosvenor, St. Louis/Kansas City
- Halfback: Red Tobin, Memphis
- Halfback: Fred Hambright, Charlotte
- Tailback: Tony Kaska, St. Louis/Kansas City

=== AFL All-League team (selected by coaches) ===
FIRST TEAM

- End: Cliff Ashburn, St. Louis/Kansas City
- End: Burle Robison, Memphis
- Tackle: Hugh Rhea, St. Louis/Kansas City
- Tackle: Champ Siebold, Memphis
- Guard: George Mougin, Charlotte
- Guard: Danny McMullen, Memphis
- Center: Homer Hansen, Dallas
- Quarterback: George Grosvenor, St. Louis/Kansas City
- Halfback: Ted Sassele, Memphis
- Halfback: Casey Kimbrell, Louisville
- Tailback: Tony Kaska

SECOND TEAM

- End: Dutch Kreuter, Charlotte (only one end chosen for second team)
- Tackle: Charles Zunker, Dallas
- Tackle: Nap Nisonger, Memphis
- Guard: Win Croft, St. Louis/Kansas City
- Guard: Cliff Norvell, Memphis
- Center: Art Koeninger, Memphis
- Quarterback: Frosty Peters, Memphis; Johnny Branch, Charlotte (tie)
- Halfback: Earl Clary, Charlotte
- Halfback: Dick Frahm, St. Louis/Kansas City
- Fullback: Ross Hall, Tulsa
