= Squyres =

Squyres may refer to:

- Seaman Squyres, American football player
- Steve Squyres, American planetary scientist
- Tim Squyres, American film editor
- Minor planet 10044 Squyres
