= McGirl =

McGirl is a surname. Notable people with the surname include:

- Francis McGirl, suspect in the assassination of Lord Mountbatten
- John Joe McGirl (1921–1988), Irish politician
- Leonard McGirl (1909–1963), American football player
- Mike McGirl, American politician
