= Tom Blondin =

American football player (1910–1978)

- Blondin in 1933

Profile
- Position: Guard

Personal information
- Born: October 25, 1910; Marietta, Ohio
- Died: December 15, 1978 (aged 68); Parkersburg, West Virginia
- Listed height: 6 ft 0 in (1.83 m)
- Listed weight: 195 lb (88 kg)

Career information
- High school: Williamstown (WV)
- College: West Virginia Wesleyan

Career history
- Cincinnati Reds (1933)

Thomas Albert Blondin (October 15, 1910 – December 15, 1978) was an American football player. He played college football at West Virginia Wesleyan and professional football in the National Football League (NFL) as a guard for the Cincinnati Reds.

== Biography ==
Blondin was born in 1910 in Marietta, Ohio. He attended Williamstown High School in Williamstown, West Virginia. He played college football at West Virginia Wesleyan from 1929 to 1932. He was named in 1932 as a first-team guard on multiple All-West Virginia college football teams, including the team selected by the United Press. He was also invited to participate in the 1932 North-South football all-star game.

During the 1933 season, he played in the NFL for the Cincinnati Reds. He was moved from the guard position to end in mid-October 1933.

Blondin died in 1978 in Parkersburg, West Virginia.
