= Marger Apsit =

American football player (1909–1988)

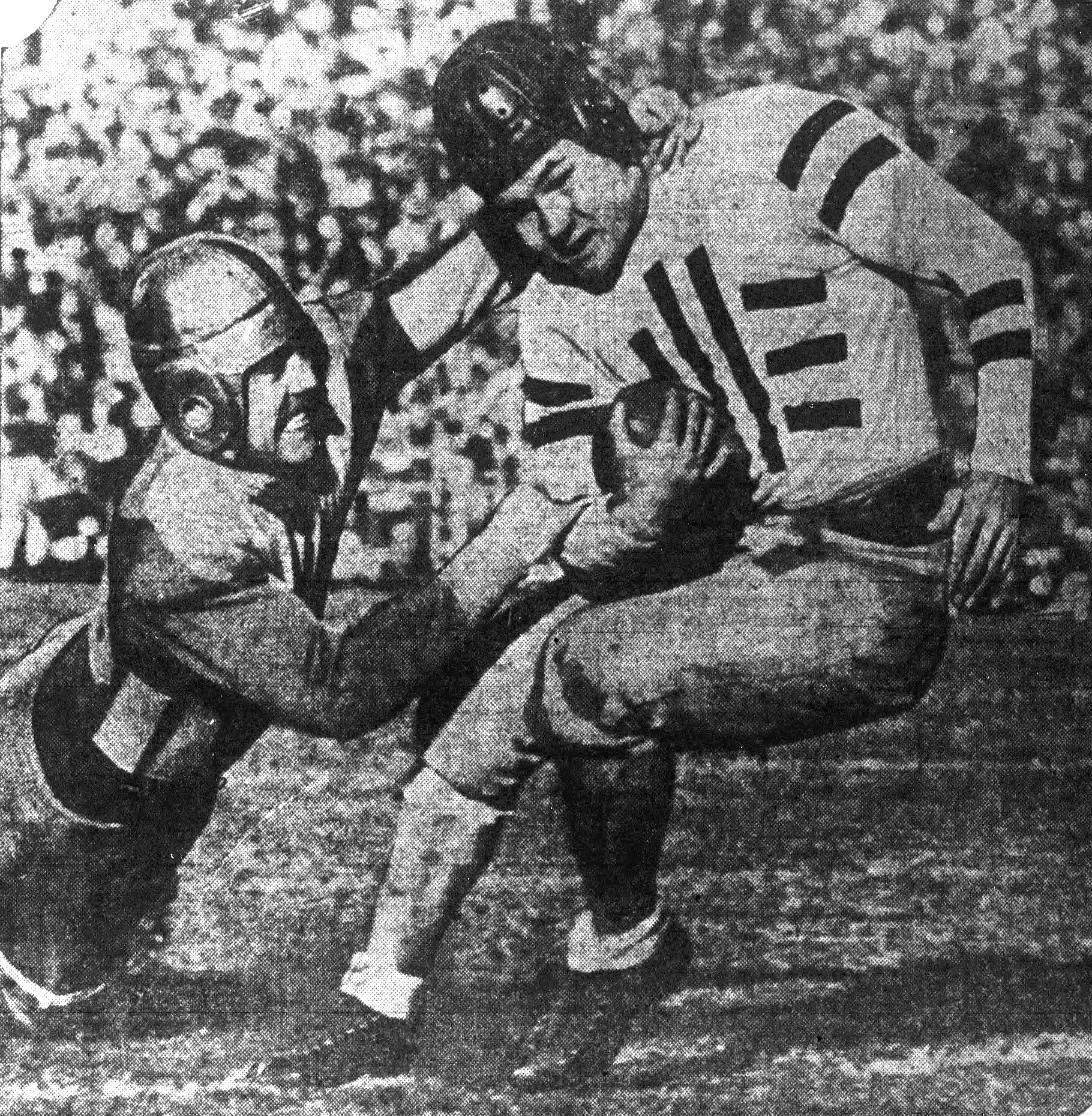
- Apsit (left) being tackled by Toby Uansa during the 1930 Rose Bowl

No. 25, 44, 29
- Position: Running back

Personal information
- Born: June 5, 1909; Aurora, Illinois, U.S.
- Died: December 22, 1988 (aged 79); Bakersfield, California, U.S.
- Listed height: 5 ft 11 in (1.80 m)
- Listed weight: 200 lb (91 kg)

Career information
- High school: West Aurora (Aurora, Illinois)
- College: USC

Career history

Playing
- Frankford Yellow Jackets (1931); Brooklyn Dodgers (1931); Green Bay Packers (1932); Boston Redskins (1933); Cincinnati Reds (1934)*
- * Offseason or practice squad member only

Coaching
- Glendale (CA) (1946–1948) Head coach

Career statistics
- Games played: 23
- Games started: 10
- Rushing yards: 41
- Receiving yards: 24
- Stats at Pro Football Reference

Marger "Migs" Apsit (June 5, 1909 – December 22, 1988) was an American football running back in the National Football League (NFL) for the Brooklyn Dodgers, the Frankford Yellow Jackets, the Green Bay Packers, and the Boston Redskins. He played college football at the University of Southern California.

== Early life ==
Apsit was born in Aurora, Illinois to Latvian immigrants in 1909. He attended West Aurora High School, where he played football from 1924 to 1926 as a fullback and defensive back.

== College career ==
Apsit attended and played college football at the University of Southern California under coach Howard Jones. While playing at USC, the Trojans compiled a record of 27–4–1, won the 1928 national championship, and defeated the undefeated Pittsburgh Panthers in the 1930 Rose Bowl.

== Professional career ==
After graduating from USC, Apsit played football professionally in the NFL for the Frankford Yellow Jackets, Brooklyn Dodgers, Green Bay Packers, and Boston Redskins. On July 1, 1934, the Redskins traded Apsit and Tay Brown to the Cincinnati Reds for Frank Abruzzino. Apsit was later released by the Reds.

== Coaching career ==
After retiring from professional football, Apsit returned, in 1935, to Aurora to become head coach at his alma mater, West Aurora High School. In 1936, he led the West Aurora Blackbawks to an undefeated 9–0 record and conference championship. After coaching at West Aurora for eight seasons, he moved to California, in 1942, and became the head football coach at Glendale College in 1946. He then became the head coach at East Bakersfield High School in Bakersfield, California, a position he held for over 20 years. While at East Bakersfield, Apsit was also the athletic director and golf coach.
