= Blake Workman =

American football player (1908–1983)

- Workman, 1931 Tulsa yearbook

Profile
- Position: Back

Personal information
- Born: August 12, 1908; Decatur, Texas, U.S.
- Died: June 9, 1983 (aged 74); Opelousas, Louisiana, U.S.
- Listed height: 5 ft 11 in (1.80 m)
- Listed weight: 185 lb (84 kg)

Career information
- High school: Decatur (TX)
- College: Decatur Baptist (1927–1928); Cameron (1929); Tulsa (1930–1932)

Career history
- Cincinnati Reds (1933); St. Louis Gunners (1934)

Blake Lunsford Workman (August 12, 1908 – June 9, 1983) was an American football player. He played college football for Decatur Baptist College (1927–1928), the Cameron Aggies (1929), and Tulsa (1930–1932). He also played professional football in the National Football League (NFL) for the Cincinnati Reds (1933) and St. Louis Gunners (1934).

== Early life ==
Workman was born in Decatur, Texas, in 1908. He graduated from Decatur High School in May 1927.

== College football ==
Workman, 1932

Workman played six years of college football for Decatur Baptist College in 1927 and 1928, for the Cameron Aggies in 1929, and for the Tulsa Golden Hurricanes from 1930 to 1932.

== Professional football ==
Workman professional football in the National Football League (NFL) as a back for the Cincinnati Reds in 1933 and the St. Louis Gunners in 1934. He appeared in seven NFL games, four as a starter. He tallied 11 rushing yards and 19 receiving yards.

== Later life ==
Workman died in June 1983 at age 75 at his home in Opelousas, Louisiana.
