= Mulleneaux =

Mulleneaux is a surname. Notable people with the surname include:

- Carl Mulleneaux (1914–1995), American football player
- Lee Mulleneaux (1908–1985), American football player
