= Al Jolley =

American football player and coach (1899–1948)

No. 4 (1922) 22 (1923) 8 (1929)
- Position: Tackle

Personal information
- Born: September 29, 1899; Onaga, Kansas, U.S.
- Died: August 26, 1948 (aged 48); Marietta, Ohio, U.S.
- Listed height: 6 ft 2 in (1.88 m)
- Listed weight: 220 lb (100 kg)

Career information
- College: Kansas State; Marietta; Tulsa

Career history

Playing
- 1921: Cleveland Tigers
- 1922: Akron Pros
- 1923: Dayton Triangles
- 1923: Oorang Indians
- 1929: Buffalo Bisons
- 1930: Brooklyn Dodgers
- 1931: Cleveland Indians

Coaching
- 1929: Buffalo Bisons
- 1933: Cincinnati Reds
- Coaching profile at Pro Football Reference

Alvin Jay "Rocky" Jolley (September 29, 1899 – August 26, 1948) was an American professional football player and coach. He played for the Cleveland Tigers, Akron Pros, Dayton Triangles, Oorang Indians, Buffalo Bisons, Brooklyn Dodgers and Cleveland Indians. He was a coach for the Bisons and Cincinnati Reds. He also played for the Ironton Tanks of the Ohio League.

Jolley was also a Native American. He was a member of the Wyandotte Nation. This made him eligible to join the NFL's Oorang Indians. The Indians were a team based in LaRue, Ohio, composed only of Native Americans, and coached by Jim Thorpe.

== Coaching ==
In 1929 Jolley coached the Bisons in a season that saw the team winning just one game. Afterwards the team finally folded for good, making Jolley the franchise's last coach. Jolley coached the Dodgers in the first ever NFL night game held on Wednesday September 24, 1930, in Portsmouth, Ohio. The Dodgers lost game 12-0 to the Portsmouth Spartans, the forerunners to the modern day Detroit Lions.

== Head coaching record ==
Team	Year	Regular season					Postseason			
Team	Year	Won	Lost	Ties	Win %	Finish	Won	Lost	Win %	Result
BUF	1929	1	7	1	.167	10th in NFL	–	–	–	–
BUF Total		1	7	1	.167		–	–	–	–
CIN	1933	0	3	0	.000	4th in NFL Western	–	–	–	–
CIN Total		0	3	0	.000		–	–	–	–
NFL Total		1	10	1	.125		–	–	–	–
Total		1	10	1	.125		–	–	–	–
