= John Burleson =

American football player (1909–1983)

No. 47, 25, 33
- Position: Lineman

Personal information
- Born: August 21, 1909; Albany, Texas, U.S.
- Died: October 6, 1983 (aged 74); Abilene, Texas, U.S.
- Listed height: 6 ft 2 in (1.88 m)
- Listed weight: 237 lb (108 kg)

Career information
- College: SMU

Career history
- Portsmouth Spartans (1933); Pittsburgh Pirates (1933); Cincinnati Reds (1933)
- Stats at Pro Football Reference

John Charles Burleson (August 21, 1909 – October 6, 1983) was an American football lineman who played one season in the National Football League (NFL) with the Portsmouth Spartans, Pittsburgh Pirates and Cincinnati Reds. He played college football at Southern Methodist University.

== College career ==
Burleson began attending Southern Methodist University in 1927. By 1930, he had become a skilled offensive lineman with the Mustangs, earning him a spot in the M Association, reserved for solely the school's varsity lettermen. He finished at SMU in the spring of 1931.

== Professional career ==
Though Burleson's career was brief, playing just a single season in the NFL, he played for three separate teams. His first signing was with the Portsmouth Spartans as an offensive guard. He then traveled to Pittsburgh mid-season to play on the inaugural Pittsburgh Steelers roster. At the time of his signing, the Steelers were called the Pittsburgh Pirates and were headed by player-coach Jap Douds. He was installed on the team's offensive line to help protect starting quarterback Tony Holm. After appearing in a few games with Pittsburgh, he was shipped off to play for the Cincinnati Reds for the remainder of the season. Burleson did not return to the league in 1934, ending his career with six total game appearances for three different times in just one season.

== Later life ==
After his playing career ended, Burleson moved back to Texas, settling in Schleicher County. It was there he married Velma Lelia Parker, a schoolteacher, in 1940.

Burleson died in Abilene, Texas in 1983 at the age of 74.
