= Marion Broadstone =

American football player (1906–1972)

No. 4
- Positions: Tackle, guard

Personal information
- Born: June 24, 1906; Pender, Nebraska, U.S.
- Died: April 10, 1972 (aged 65); Alameda County, California, U.S.
- Listed height: 6 ft 2 in (1.88 m)
- Listed weight: 210 lb (95 kg)

Career information
- High school: Norfolk (Norfolk, Nebraska)
- College: Nebraska (1927–1930)

Career history
- New York Giants (1931); Chicago Cardinals (1933)*
- * Offseason or practice squad member only

Awards and highlights
- First-team All-Big Six (1928); 2× Second-team All-Big Six (1929, 1930)
- Stats at Pro Football Reference

Marion Glenn Broadstone (June 24, 1906 – April 10, 1972) was an American professional football player who played one season with the New York Giants of the National Football League (NFL). He played college football at the University of Nebraska.

== Early life and college ==
Marion Glenn Broadstone was born on June 24, 1906, in Pender, Nebraska. He attended Norfolk High School in Norfolk, Nebraska.

Broadstone was a member of the Nebraska Cornhuskers of the University of Nebraska from 1927 to 1930 and a three-year letterman from 1928 to 1930. He was named Associated Press (AP) first-team All-Big Six in 1928, AP second-team All-Big Six in 1929, and United Press second-team All-Big Six in 1930. He wore jersey number 46 while with the Cornhuskers. Broadstone was inducted into the Nebraska Football Hall of Fame in 2001.

== Professional career ==
Broadstone signed with the New York Giants on April 23, 1931. He played in three games, starting one, for the Giants during the 1931 season. He was listed as a tackle/guard, and wore number 4 with the Giants.

Broadstone was signed by the Chicago Cardinals in 1933 but later released.

== Personal life ==
Broadstone died on April 10, 1972, in Alameda County, California.
