= Leonard McGirl =

American football player (1909–1963)

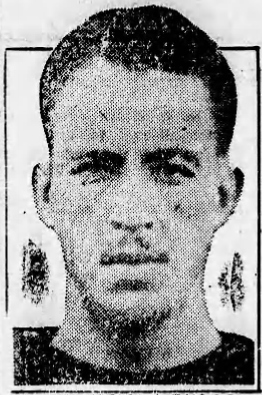
- McGirl, circa 1930

No. 45
- Position: Guard

Personal information
- Born: August 12, 1909; Washington, Missouri, U.S.
- Died: February 1, 1963 (aged 53); Philadelphia, Pennsylvania, U.S.
- Listed height: 6 ft 2 in (1.88 m)
- Listed weight: 206 lb (93 kg)

Career information
- High school: Odessa (Odessa, Missouri)
- College: Missouri

Career history
- St. Louis Gunners (1933–1935); St. Louis Terriers (1936); St. Louis Gunners (1937)

Awards and highlights
- First-team All-Big Six (1930)
- Stats at Pro Football Reference

Leonard Edward McGirl (August 12, 1909 – February 1, 1963) was an American professional football guard who played for the St. Louis Gunners of the National Football League (NFL). He played college football for the Missouri Tigers.

== Early life ==
Leonard Edward McGirl was born on August 12, 1909, in Washington, Missouri. He attended Odessa High School in Odessa, Missouri.

== College career ==
McGirl enrolled at the University of Missouri to play college football for the Tigers. He was a three-year letterman from 1928 to 1930. He was captain of the 1930 team. McGirl was named first-team All-Big Six Conference by both the Associated Press and United Press for his performance during the 1930 season at guard.

== Professional career ==
McGirl played for the independent St. Louis Gunners in 1933 as a guard. The Gunners joined the National Football League (NFL) in 1934. McGirl competed with Russ Lay, Bill Montgomery, and Homer Reynolds for a starting guard job. McGirl ended up starting the most games out of any of them during the 1934 NFL season. He played in three games (all starts). The Gunners returned to the independent scene in 1935, with McGirl remaining a member of the team.

McGirl played for the St. Louis Terriers in 1936.

In 1937, the Gunners moved to the Midwest Football League (MFL). In McGirl's final year with the team, he played in three games (starting two) during the 1937 MFL season.

== Personal life ==
In December 1930, McGirl had surgery for appendicitis. On February 1, 1963, at the age of 53, he died in Philadelphia due to heart disease.
