= Joe Crakes =

American football player (1907–1976)

- Joe Crakes c 1952

Profile
- Position: End

Personal information
- Born: December 29, 1907; Platte, South Dakota
- Died: March 23, 1976 (aged 68); Victorville, California
- Listed height: 6 ft 1 in (1.85 m)
- Listed weight: 205 lb (93 kg)

Career information
- College: South Dakota

Career history
- Chicago Cardinals (1932); Cincinnati Reds (1933)

Career statistics
- Receptions: 4
- Receiving yards: 40

Joseph Henry Crakes (December 29, 1907 – March 23, 1976) was an American football player.

Crakes was born in 1907 in Platte, South Dakota. He attended the University of South Dakota where he won three freshmen letters and nine varsity letters in football, basketball, and track.

He then played professional football in the National Football League (NFL) as an end for the Chicago Cardinals in 1932 and for the Cincinnati Reds in 1933 and 1934. He appeared in 10 NFL games, four as a starter, tallying four receptions for 40 yards.

After his football career ended, he began a career in the Army and later the Air Force. He was promoted to first lieutenant in 1935, to captain in 1941, and to major in 1942. He served as headquarters commandant at the 5th Air Service Command starting in 1942. He graduated from the Fort Leavenworth Command and General Staff College in 1943 and served as deputy commanding officer at Lawrence Field in Georgia. He was promoted to lieutenant colonel in 1945 and assigned to the Azores Base Command. He also served as base commander and commanding officer of the 4702d Air Force Defense Wing at Fairchild Air Force Base south of Spokane, Washington, and later as base commander of George Air Force Base in Victorville, California. He retired from the Air Force in 1961.

Crakes married Deloras Flyn in 1932. They had a son, Patrick. Crakes died in 1976 at age 68 at the George Air Force Base Hospital in Victorville. He was buried at the Black Hills National Cemetery and posthumously inducted into the University of South Dakota's Coyotes Hall of Fame in 1975.
