= Frank Potts (coach) =

American pole vaulter and coach

Biographical details
- Born: January 15, 1903; Sulphur, Oklahoma, U.S.
- Died: May 26, 1990 (aged 87); Boulder, Colorado, U.S.

Playing career

Football
- 1925–1926: Oklahoma

Track and field
- 1925–1927: Oklahoma

Basketball
- 1924–1927: Oklahoma
- Positions: Halfback (football); Pole vault (track)

Coaching career (HC unless noted)

Football
- 1927–?: Colorado (assistant)
- 1940: Colorado
- 1944–1945: Colorado

Cross country / track and field
- 1927–1968: Colorado

Head coaching record
- Overall: 16–8–1 (football)

Accomplishments and honors

Championships
- Football; 1 Mountain States (1944)

Awards
- First-team All-MVC (1926); Second-team All-MVC (1925)

Frank Calhoun Potts (January 15, 1903 – May 26, 1990) was an American college football player, track and field athlete, and coach of American football, cross country, and track. He served as the head cross country and track coach of the University of Colorado at Boulder from 1927 to 1968. Potts also coached the Colorado Buffaloes football team in 1940, 1944, and 1945, compiling a record of 16–8–1.

A native of Ada, Oklahoma, Potts attended the University of Oklahoma, where he played college football as a halfback, on the basketball team, and competed in track as a pole vaulter. Potts vaulted 3.76 meters to win the pole vault at the 1925 NCAA Outdoor Track and Field Championships in a five-way tie. He was captain of the track team in 1927.

After graduating from Oklahoma in 1927, Potts went to Colorado as head track coach and assistant football coach.

Potts died on May 26, 1990, at Boulder Manor Heather Care Center in Boulder, Colorado.

== Head coaching record ==
=== Football ===
Year	Team	Overall	Conference	Standing
Colorado Buffaloes (Mountain States Conference) (1940)
1940	Colorado	5–3–1	4–1–1	T–2nd
Colorado Buffaloes (Mountain States Conference) (1944–1945)
1944	Colorado	6–2	2–0	1st
1945	Colorado	5–3	3–1	2nd
Colorado:		16–8–1	9–2–1	
Total:		16–8–1		
National championship Conference title Conference division title or championship game berth

== See also ==
- List of college football head coaches with non-consecutive tenure
