= 1925 All-Missouri Valley Conference football team =

The 1925 All-Missouri Valley Conference football team consists of American football players chosen by various organizations for All-Missouri Valley Conference teams for the 1925 college football season. The selectors for the 1925 season included the Associated Press (AP).

== All-Missouri Valley selections ==
=== Ends ===
- Carl Bacchus, Missouri (AP-1)
- Ted Sloane, Drake (AP-1)
- Coglizer, Missouri (AP-2)
- Baker, Kansas State (AP-2)

=== Tackles ===
- Ed Weir, Nebraska (AP-1)
- Ed Lindenmeyer, Missouri (AP-1)
- Steiner, Nebraska (AP-2)
- Firpo Wilcox, Oklahoma (AP-2)

=== Guards ===
- Ed Brockman, Oklahoma (AP-1)
- Harry McGee, Kansas State (AP-1)
- Richardson, Missouri (AP-2)
- Walker, Missouri (AP-2)

=== Centers ===
- Harold Hutchinson, Nebraska (AP-1)
- Wallace, Oklahoma (AP-2)

=== Quarterbacks ===
- Johnny Behm, Iowa State (AP-1)
- Cochrane, Kansas State (AP-2)

=== Halfbacks ===
- Sam Whiteman, Missouri (AP-1)
- Glen Spear, Drake (AP-1)
- Gordon Meeter, Grinnell (AP-2)
- Jackson, Missouri (AP-2)

=== Fullbacks ===
- John Rhodes, Nebraska (AP-1)
- Frank Potts, Oklahoma (AP-2)

== Key ==
AP = Associated Press

== See also ==
- 1925 College Football All-America Team
