= Carl Bacchus =

American football player (1904–1985)

No. 12, 18
- Position: End

Personal information
- Born: July 31, 1904; Pine Bluff, Arkansas, U.S.
- Died: March 2, 1985 (aged 80); Kansas City, Missouri, U.S.
- Listed height: 6 ft 0 in (1.83 m)
- Listed weight: 204 lb (93 kg)

Career information
- High school: Kansas City (MO) Central
- College: Missouri

Career history
- Cleveland Bulldogs (1927); Detroit Wolverines (1928)

Awards and highlights
- 2× Third-team All-American (1925, 1926); 2× First-team All-MVC (1925, 1926)
- Stats at Pro Football Reference

Robert Carl Bacchus (July 31, 1904 – March 2, 1985) was an American professional football player who was an end in the National Football League (NFL).

Bacchus was born in Pine Bluff, Arkansas, in 1904. He played at the end position in the NFL for the 1927 Cleveland Bulldogs and the 1928 Detroit Wolverines. He also played college football at the University of Missouri where he was selected by the Associated Press as a third-team player on the 1926 College Football All-America Team.

During World War II, Bacchus served in the Army Air Forces and received a Bronze Star.

Bacchus moved to Kansas City, Missouri, as a boy and lived there for the rest of his life. He was married in 1935 to Mildred Matthew. He worked from approximately 1945 to 1970 for the Kansas City Life Insurance Co.; he finished as the company's vice president and director of real estate and city loans.
