= Gil Lefebvre =

American football player (1910–1987)

Profile
- Position: Back

Personal information
- Born: March 10, 1910; Douglas, Arizona, U.S.
- Died: May 7, 1987 (aged 77); Bellflower, California, U.S.
- Listed height: 5 ft 6 in (1.68 m)
- Listed weight: 155 lb (70 kg)

Career information
- High school: Manual Arts (Los Angeles, California)

Career history
- Cincinnati Reds (1933–1934); Detroit Lions (1935)

Awards and highlights
- NFL champion (1935)
- Stats at Pro Football Reference

Gilbert "Frenchy" Lefebvre (March 10, 1910 – May 7, 1987) was an American football player. He played professional football for the Cincinnati Reds from 1933 to 1934. In December 1933, he set an NFL record with a 98-yard punt return that was not broken until 1994. In 1935, he appeared in one game for the 1935 Detroit Lions team that won the 1935 NFL Championship Game. He later played with the Los Angeles Bulldogs, Hollywood Braves and Hollywood Stars in Pacific Coast football competition.
