= Firpo Wilcox =

American football player and wrestler (1901–1962)

No. 15, 21
- Position: Tackle

Personal information
- Born: December 21, 1901; Bixby, Oklahoma Territory, U.S.
- Died: August 2, 1962 (aged 60); Muskogee, Oklahoma, U.S.
- Listed height: 6 ft 0 in (1.83 m)
- Listed weight: 205 lb (93 kg)

Career information
- High school: Bixby (OK)
- College: Oklahoma

Career history
- Buffalo Rangers (1926); Staten Island Stapletons (1930)

Awards and highlights
- Second-team All-MVC (1925)
- Stats at Pro Football Reference

John Harrison "Firpo" Wilcox (December 21, 1901 – August 2, 1962) was an American football player and professional wrestler.

Wilcox was born in Bixby, Oklahoma Territory in 1901. He was the son of Bixby pioneers. He moved as a child to Leonard, Oklahoma.

He played college football for Kendall College and the University of Oklahoma. He also competed in wrestling at Oklahoma. He also played professional football in the National Football League (NFL) as a tackle for the Buffalo Rangers in 1926 and Staten Island Stapletons in 1930. He appeared in 12 NFL games, 11 as a starter.

After retiring from football, he worked as a professional wrestler in the late 1920s and 1930s. He was billed as an "Oklahoma Indian" (sometimes as "Chief Firpo Wilcox") during his wrestling career.

He also served in the U.S. Army during World War II. In later years, he was engaged in the oil business in Oklahoma. He died in 1962 at the veterans hospital in Muskogee, Oklahoma.
