= 1927 All-Missouri Valley Conference football team =

The 1927 All-Missouri Valley Conference football team consists of American football players chosen by various organizations for All-Missouri Valley Conference teams for the 1927 college football season. The selectors for the 1927 season included the Associated Press (AP).

== All-Missouri Valley selections ==
=== Ends ===
- Roy LeCrone, Oklahoma (AP-1)
- Miller Brown, Missouri (AP-1)
- Harold Hauser, Kansas (AP-2)
- Ted Fleck, Kansas State (AP-2)

=== Tackles ===
- Ray Randels, Nebraska (AP-1)
- Granville Norris, Oklahoma (AP-1)
- William W. Smith, Missouri (AP-2)
- Francis E. Lucas, Missouri (AP-2)

=== Guards ===
- Danny McMullen, Nebraska (AP-1)
- Robert N. Miller, Missouri (AP-1)
- Bob Fischer, Iowa State (AP-2)
- Elmer Holm, Nebraska (AP-2)

=== Centers ===
- Gould Ayres, Iowa State (AP-1)
- Theodore James, Nebraska (AP-2)

=== Quarterbacks ===
- Wales, Iowa State (AP-1)
- A. Lynwood Haskins, Oklahoma (AP-2)

=== Halfbacks ===
- Robert Mehrle, Missouri (AP-1)
- Glenn Presnell, Nebraska (AP-1)
- Harry Lindblom, Iowa State (AP-2)
- Joe Holsinger, Kansas State (AP-2)

=== Fullbacks ===
- Blue Howell, Nebraska (AP-1)
- John Miller, Iowa State (AP-2)

== Key ==
AP = Associated Press

== See also ==
- 1927 College Football All-America Team
- 1927 Missouri Valley Intercollegiate Athletic Association football season
