= 1928 All-Big Six Conference football team =

The 1928 All-Big Six Conference football team consists of American football players chosen by various organizations for All-Big Six Conference teams for the 1928 college football season. The selectors for the 1928 season included the Associated Press (AP).

== All-Big Six selections ==
=== Ends ===
- Tom Churchill, Oklahoma (AP-1)
- Miller Brown, Missouri (AP-1)
- Harold Hauser, Kansas (AP-2)
- Cliff Ashburn, Nebraska (AP-2)

=== Tackles ===
- Babe Lyon, Kansas State (AP-1)
- Marion Broadstone, Nebraska (AP-1)
- Ray Richards, Nebraska (AP-2)
- Glen B. Munn, Nebraska (AP-2)

=== Guards ===
- Elmer Holm, Nebraska (AP-1)
- Danny McMullen, Nebraska (AP-1)
- John Shannon, Kansas (AP-2)
- Carl Kern, Iowa State (AP-2)

=== Centers ===
- Ted James, Nebraska (AP-1)
- Bert Pearson, Kansas State (AP-2)

=== Quarterbacks ===
- Fay Russell, Nebraska (AP-1)
- Harry Lindblom, Iowa State (AP-2)

=== Halfbacks ===
- Clair Sloan, Nebraska (AP-1)
- Robert Mehrle, Missouri (AP-1)
- A. Lynwood Haskins, Oklahoma (AP-2)
- Paul Trauger, Iowa State (AP-2)

=== Fullbacks ===
- Blue Howell, Nebraska (AP-1)
- John Waldorf, Missouri (AP-2)

== Key ==
AP = Associated Press

== See also ==
- 1928 College Football All-America Team
