= Frank Abruzzino =

American football player (1908–1986)

No. 30, 39
- Position: Back

Personal information
- Born: January 22, 1908; Shinnston, West Virginia, U.S.
- Died: June 13, 1986 (aged 78); Dade County, Florida, U.S.
- Listed height: 6 ft 0 in (1.83 m)
- Listed weight: 193 lb (88 kg)

Career information
- High school: Shinnston (West Virginia)
- College: Colgate (1927–1930)

Career history
- Brooklyn Dodgers (1931); Cincinnati Reds (1933); Boston Redskins (1934)*
- * Offseason or practice squad member only
- Stats at Pro Football Reference

Frank Marion Abruzzino Jr. (January 22, 1908 – June 13, 1986) was an American professional football player who played two seasons in the National Football League (NFL) with the Brooklyn Dodgers and Cincinnati Reds. He played college football at Colgate University.

== Early life and college ==
Frank Marion Abruzzino Jr. was born on January 22, 1908, in Shinnston, West Virginia. He attended Shinnston High School in Shinnston.

He was a member of the Colgate Raiders of Colgate University from 1927 to 1930 and a three-year letterman from 1928 to 1930.

== Professional career ==
Abruzzino signed with the Brooklyn Dodgers of the National Football League (NFL) in 1931. He played in all 14 games, starting seven, for the Dodgers during the 1931 season. The team finished the year with a 2–12 record. Abruzzino became a free agent after the season.

He was purchased by the Cincinnati Reds of the NFL on August 5, 1933. He appeared in nine games, starting four, for the Reds in 1933.

On July 1, 1934, Abruzzino was traded to the Boston Redskins for Tay Brown and Marger Apsit. He was later released by the Redskins.

== Personal life ==
Abruzzino died on June 13, 1986, in Dade County, Florida.
