= Chuck Braidwood =

American football player (1903–1945)

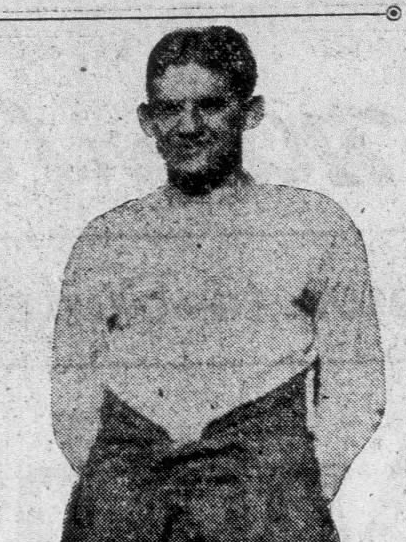
- Braidwood, circa 1926

Profile
- Position: End

Personal information
- Born: October 15, 1903; Chicago, Illinois, U.S.
- Died: January 8, 1945 (aged 41); Biak Island, Indonesia

Career information
- College: Loyola (Chicago); Tennessee (Chattanooga)

Career history
- 1930: Portsmouth Spartans
- 1931: Cleveland Indians
- 1932: Chicago Cardinals
- 1933: Cincinnati Reds

Other information
- Military career
- Allegiance: United States
- Branch: Red Cross
- Conflicts: World War II

Charles Grant Braidwood (October 15, 1903 – January 8, 1945) was an American professional football player who was an end for four seasons for the Portsmouth Spartans, Cleveland Indians, Chicago Cardinals, and Cincinnati Reds.

After ending his playing career, Braidwood was a wrestling referee in Tennessee. During World War II, he was an American Red Cross program director, working overseas to help the Allied war effort. While serving in the Red Cross, he died of a heart attack on Biak Island. He is buried in Fort William McKinley in Manila, Philippines.

Braidwood was the son of James Grant Braidwood and Cornelia Mayerhofernee McDole. He was one of four children; his siblings were Louise I Braidwood, Andrew W. Braidwood and Edna Braidwood.
