= Dick Powell (American football) =

American football player (1904–1986)

Profile
- Position: End

Personal information
- Born: May 21, 1904; Gilmer County, West Virginia
- Died: April 29, 1986 (aged 81); Martinsville, Virginia
- Listed height: 6 ft 2 in (1.88 m)
- Listed weight: 215 lb (98 kg)

Career information
- High school: Glenville Normal (WV)
- College: Davis & Elkins

Career history
- New York Giants (1932); Cincinnati Reds (1933)

Richard Lee Powell (May 21, 1904 – April 29, 1986) was an American football player. He played college football at Davis & Elkins and professional football in the National Football League (NFL) as an end for the New York Giants in 1932 and the Cincinnati Reds in 1933. He appeared in five NFL games.
