= Bert Pearson (American football) =

American football player (1905–1945)

Profile
- Position: Center

Personal information
- Born: March 22, 1905; Manhattan, Kansas, U.S.
- Died: May 1, 1945 (aged 40); New Plymouth, Idaho, U.S.
- Listed height: 6 ft 0 in (1.83 m)
- Listed weight: 206 lb (93 kg)

Career information
- High school: Manhattan
- College: Kansas State

Career history
- Chicago Bears (1929–1934); Chicago Cardinals (1935–1936)

Awards and highlights
- 2× NFL champion (1932, 1933); Second-team All-Big Six (1928)
- Stats at Pro Football Reference

Madison Bertrand Pearson (March 22, 1905 – May 1, 1945) was an American professional football player. Pearson played eight years in the National Football League (NFL), mainly for the Chicago Bears. He was an offensive lineman. He was born in Manhattan, Kansas.
