= Hal Hilpirt =

American football player (1908–1998)

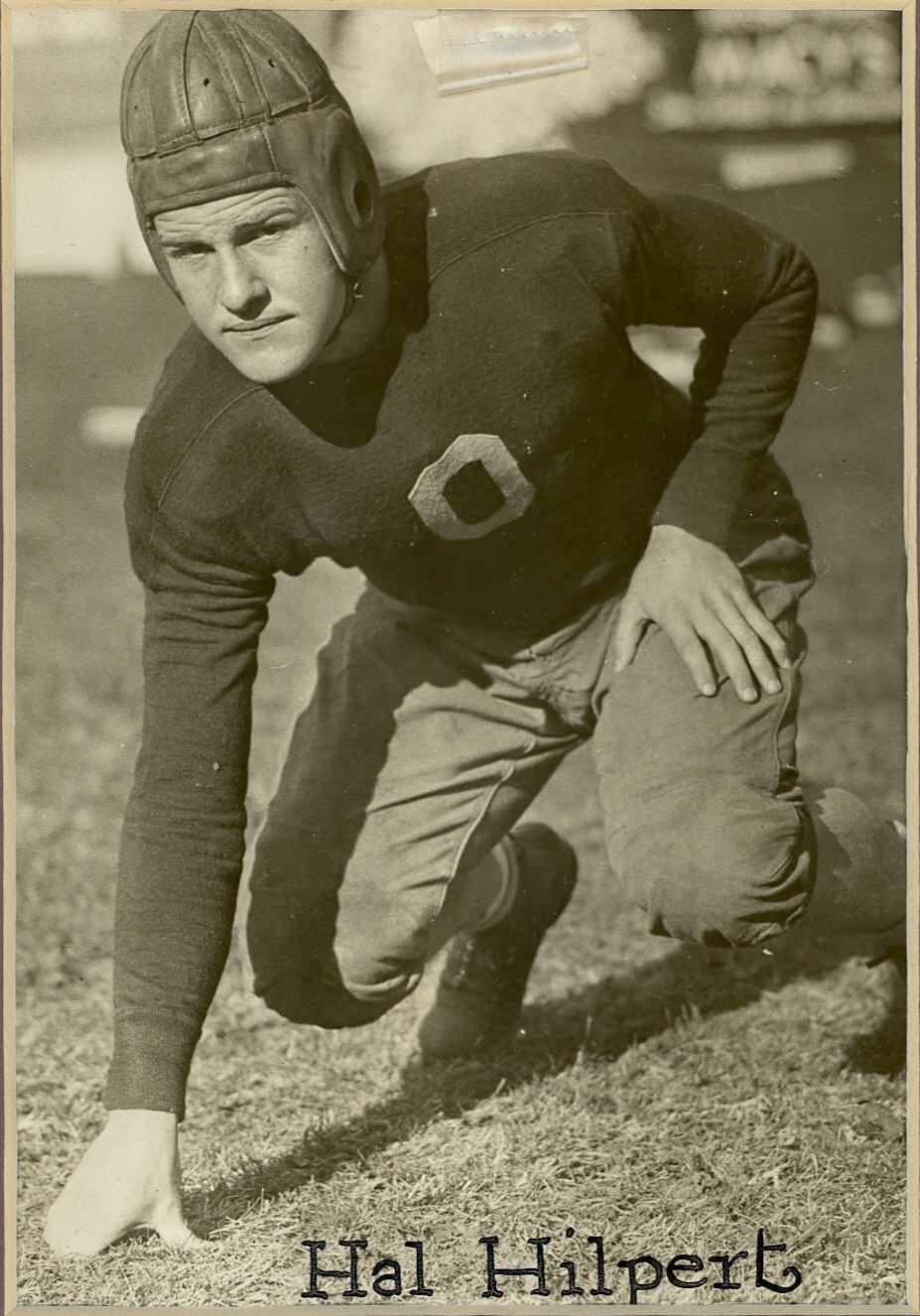

No. 0
- Position: End

Personal information
- Born: August 9, 1908; Aurora, Missouri, U.S.
- Died: September 16, 1998 (aged 90); Irving, TX, U.S.
- Listed height: 5 ft 9 in (1.75 m)
- Listed weight: 188 lb (85 kg)

Career information
- High school: Central (Oklahoma City, Oklahoma)
- College: Oklahoma City

Career history
- New York Giants (1930); Cincinnati Reds (1933)

Career statistics
- Games played: 11
- Games started: 3
- Stats at Pro Football Reference

Hal Hilpirt (August 9, 1908 – September 16, 1998) was an American football end who played in the National Football League (NFL) for the New York Giants, Chicago Cardinals and the Cincinnati Football Reds. He played college football for the Oklahoma City Goldbugs. He was part of the beginnings of the modern era of American professional football.

== Playing career ==
Hilpirt was signed out of Oklahoma City University by the New York Giants where he played right end, and was a substitute for Glenn Campbell. He started 2 games that year while the Giants went 13–4.

He played one more season with the Reds, retiring from professional football in 1933.

== Coaching career ==
In 1945, Hilpirt was responsible for the organization of the Junior America Legion Baseball Association in Jackson County, Oklahoma coaching championship teams in 1945, 1948 & 1951. He also coached at Capitol, Foster, Altus and Snider High Schools in Oklahoma before moving to Irving, Texas.
