= Lee Mulleneaux =

American football player (1908–1985)

No. 0, 9, 33, 18, 13
- Positions: Center, wingback

Personal information
- Born: April 1, 1908; Safford, Arizona, U.S.
- Died: November 14, 1985 (aged 77); Whittier, California, U.S.
- Listed height: 6 ft 2 in (1.88 m)
- Listed weight: 221 lb (100 kg)

Career information
- High school: Phoenix Union (Phoenix, Arizona)
- College: Arizona State Teachers

Career history
- New York Giants (1932); Cincinnati Reds (1933–1934); St. Louis Gunners (1934); Pittsburgh Pirates (1935–1936); Chicago Cardinals (1938); Green Bay Packers (1938)

Career statistics
- Rushing yards: 70
- Rushing average: 2.8
- Receptions: 3
- Receiving yards: 18
- Stats at Pro Football Reference

Cecil Lee "Brute" Mulleneaux (April 1, 1908 – November 14, 1985) was an American football center and wingback who played in the National Football League (NFL) for the New York Giants, the Cincinnati Reds, the St. Louis Gunners, the Pittsburgh Pirates, the Chicago Cardinals and the Green Bay Packers. He played college football for Arizona State Teachers.
