= Biff Lee =

American football player (1907–1986)

- Lee in 1930

No. 26, 10
- Position: Guard

Personal information
- Born: December 6, 1907; Wolf Island, Missouri, U.S.
- Died: July 5, 1986 (aged 78); San Angelo, Texas, U.S.
- Listed height: 6 ft 0 in (1.83 m)
- Listed weight: 226 lb (103 kg)

Career information
- High school: Charleston (MO)
- College: Missouri, Oklahoma

Career history
- Cleveland Indians (1931); Portsmouth Spartans (1931); Cincinnati Reds (1933–1934)

Awards and highlights
- First-team All-Big Six (1930)
- Stats at Pro Football Reference

David Hilary "Biff" Lee (December 6, 1907 – July 5, 1986) was an American football guard.

Lee was born in Wolf Island, Missouri, in 1907.

He played college football for Missouri and Oklahoma. He was selected by the Associated Press as a first-team guard on the 1930 All-Big Six Conference football team.

He also played professional football in the National Football League (NFL) as a guard for the Cleveland Indians (1931), Portsmouth Spartans (1931), and Cincinnati Reds (1933–1934). He appeared in 26 NFL games, 10 as a starter. He kicked one field goal in 1933. He was obtained by the Reds in a transaction with the Providence, Rhode Island, football team.

After retiring from football, he worked for the Missouri State Employment Service and lived in Caruthersville, Missouri. He served in the Army from 1942 to 1945. He was married to Grace Lee with whom he had three children, David H. Lee Jr. (born c 1930), Mabelanna Lee (born c 1933) and Mary S. Lee (born c 1941). He died in 1986 at age 78.
