= Rosie Grant =

American football player (1906–1976)

Ross Porter "Rosie" Grant
Personal information
- Born: December 28, 1906; Marblehead, Massachusetts
- Died: June 15, 1976 (aged 69); Boonton Township, New Jersey
- Listed height: 5 ft 11 in (1.80 m)
- Listed weight: 198 lb (90 kg)

Career information
- College: New York University

Career history
- Staten Island Stapletons (1932); Cincinnati Reds (1933-1934)

Ross Porter "Rosie" Grant (December 28, 1906 – June 15, 1976) was an American professional football player who spent three seasons in the National Football League with the Staten Island Stapletons and the Cincinnati Reds from 1932 to 1934. Grant appeared in 22 games, while making 14 starts.
