= Lew Pope =

American football player (1908–1964)

Profile
- Position: Halfback

Personal information
- Born: February 18, 1908; Hobart, Oklahoma, U.S.
- Died: February 5, 1964 (aged 55); Hobart, Oklahoma, U.S.
- Listed height: 6 ft 0 in (1.83 m)
- Listed weight: 196 lb (89 kg)

Career information
- High school: Frederick (OH)
- College: Purdue

Career history
- Providence Steam Roller (1931); Cincinnati Reds (1933–1934)

Career statistics
- Rushing yards: 342
- Passing yards: 230
- Receiving yards: 37
- Stats at Pro Football Reference

Lewis Lawrence Pope (February 18, 1908 – February 5, 1964) was an American football player.

He was born in 1908 in Hobart, Oklahoma.

He played college football as a halfback for Purdue University in 1929 and 1930 and professional football in the National Football League (NFL) as a halfback for the Providence Steam Roller in 1931 and for the Cincinnati Reds in 1933 and 1934. He appeared in 26 NFL games, 18 as a starter, tallying 342 rushing yards, 230 passing yards, 37 receiving yards. He ran 48 yards for a game-winning touchdown against the Chicago Cardinals on November 12, 1933.

After retiring from football he lived for a time in Los Angeles and later in Frederick, Oklahoma.
