= Blue Howell =

American football player and coach (1905–1964)

Biographical details
- Born: 1905
- Died: April 15, 1964 (aged 58–59); Omaha, Nebraska, U.S.

Playing career
- 1926–1928: Nebraska
- Position: Fullback

Coaching career (HC unless noted)
- 1929–1935: Pittsburg State
- 1937: Pittsburg State

Head coaching record
- Overall: 35–30–6

Accomplishments and honors

Championships
- 1 CIC (1935)

Awards
- 2× First-team All-Big Six (1927, 1928); Second-team All-MVC (1926)

Edward E. "Blue" Howell (1905 – April 15, 1964) was an American college football player and coach. He was the fifth head football coach at Kansas State Teachers College of Pittsburg—now known as Pittsburg State University—in Pittsburg, Kansas, serving for eight seasons, from 1929 to 1935 and again in 1937, compiling a record of 35–30–6.

== Playing career ==
Howell played college football at the University of Nebraska–Lincoln under head coach Ernest E. Bearg from 1926 until 1928. Weighing 185 pounds, he was the lightest member of the Cornhuskers but was considered one of the best fullbacks in the Big Six Conference. He was inducted into the program's "Hall of Fame" in 1978.

== Death ==
Howell died of a heart attack in 1964 at his home in Omaha, Nebraska.

== Head coaching record ==
Year	Team	Overall	Conference	Standing	Bowl/playoffs
Pittsburg State Gorillas (Central Intercollegiate Conference) (1929–1935)
1929	Pittsburg State	1–5–2	1–3–2	7th	
1930	Pittsburg State	6–3	3–3	4th	
1931	Pittsburg State	4–5	3–3	4th	
1932	Pittsburg State	6–1–2	4–1–1	T–2nd	
1933	Pittsburg State	4–3–2	2–2–2	3rd	
1934	Pittsburg State	6–3	3–2	T–2nd	
1935	Pittsburg State	6–3	3–1	T–1st	
Pittsburg State Gorillas (Central Intercollegiate Conference) (1937)
1937	Pittsburg State	2–7	1–3	4th	
Pittsburg State:		35–30–6	20–18–5		
Total:		35–30–6			
National championship Conference title Conference division title or championship game berth
