= 1930 All-Big Six Conference football team =

The 1930 All-Big Six Conference football team consists of American football players chosen by various organizations for All-Big Six Conference teams for the 1930 college football season. The selectors for the 1930 season included the Associated Press (AP) and the United Press (UP).

== All-Big Six selections ==
=== Ends ===
- Steve Hokuf, Nebraska (AP-1; UP-1)
- Hubert Campbell, Missouri (AP-1; UP-1)
- Arch Stuck, Kansas (AP-2)
- John Van Dyne, Missouri (AP-2)
- Gilbert Hanson, Kansas (UP-2)

=== Tackles ===
- Hugh Rhea, Nebraska (AP-1; UP-1)
- Henry Cronkite, Kansas State (AP-1; UP-2)
- Earl Foy, Kansas (AP-2; UP-1)
- Robert Fields, Oklahoma (AP-2)
- Marion Broadstone, Nebraska (UP-2)
- Curtis Berry, Oklahoma (UP-2)

=== Guards ===
- Leonard McGirl, Missouri (AP-1; UP-1)
- Hilary Lee, Oklahoma (AP-1; UP-1)
- Elmer Greenberg, Nebraska (AP-2; UP-2)
- George Atkinson, Kansas (AP-2; UP-2)

=== Centers ===
- Charles Smoot, Kansas (AP-1; UP-1)
- Lawrence Ely, Nebraska (AP-2; UP-2)

=== Quarterbacks ===
- Colonel Mills, Oklahoma (AP-1; UP-1)
- Guy Warren, Oklahoma (AP-2; UP-2)
- Paul Trauger, Iowa State (UP-2)

=== Halfbacks ===
- James Bausch, Kansas (AP-1; UP-1)
- Alex Nigro, Kansas State (AP-1; UP-1)
- Elmer Schaake, Kansas (AP-2; UP-2)
- Frosty Cox, Kansas (AP-2)
- Carnie Smith, Kansas (UP-1)

=== Fullbacks ===
- Robert Young, Nebraska (AP-1; UP-1)
- Ormond Beach, Kansas (AP-2; UP-2)

== Key ==
- AP = Associated Press
- UP = United Press

== See also ==
- 1930 College Football All-America Team
