= Ted James (American football) =

American football player and coach (1906–1999)

Biographical details
- Born: August 8, 1906; Wymore, Nebraska, U.S.
- Died: June 8, 1999 (aged 92); Denver, Colorado, U.S.

Playing career
- 1926–1928: Nebraska
- 1929: Frankford Yellow Jackets
- Positions: Center, guard

Coaching career (HC unless noted)

Football
- 1930–1932: Kearney State

Basketball
- 1930–1933: Kearney State

Head coaching record
- Overall: 13–10–2 (football); 33–27 (basketball)

Accomplishments and honors

Championships
- Football; 2 NIAA (1930)

Awards
- First-team All-Big Six (1928); Nebraska Hall of Fame (1982); UNK Hall of Fame (1982)

Theodore Lawrence James (August 8, 1906 – June 8, 1999) was an American football player and coach.

== Playing career ==
In college, James starred for the University of Nebraska–Lincoln Cornhuskers from 1926 to 1928 and was inducted into the Nebraska Football Hall of Fame. After graduating, he played for the Frankford Yellow Jackets in the National Football League (NFL), appearing in 10 games in 1929.

== Coaching career ==
After playing for one year in the NFL, he became the head football coach at the University of Nebraska at Kearney from 1930 to 1932. He accumulated a record of 13–10–2 and won the Nebraska Intercollegiate Athletic Association title in 1930.

During that time, he was also the head men's basketball coach for three seasons, compiling a 33–27 record.

== Head coaching record ==
=== Football ===
Year	Team	Overall	Conference	Standing	Bowl/playoffs
Kearney State Antelopes (Nebraska Intercollegiate Athletic Association) (1930–1932)
1930	Kearney State	7–0–1	3–0	1st	
1931	Kearney State	4–5	2–2	T–2nd	
1932	Kearney State	2–5–1	0–3–1	5th	
Kearney State:		13–10–2	5–5–1		
Total:		13–10–2			
National championship Conference title Conference division title or championship game berth
