= Babe Lyon =

American football player (1907–1970)

Profile
- Positions: Guard, tackle

Personal information
- Born: March 30, 1907; Jamestown, Kansas, U.S.
- Died: December 22, 1970 (aged 63); Manhattan, Kansas, U.S.
- Listed height: 6 ft 2 in (1.88 m)
- Listed weight: 225 lb (102 kg)

Career information
- College: Kansas State

Career history
- New York Giants (1929); Portsmouth Spartans (1930); Cleveland Indians (1931); Chicago Bears (1931); Brooklyn Dodgers (1932); St. Louis Gunners (1933–1934); Rochester Tigers (1936)

Awards and highlights
- First-team All-Big Six (1928)
- Stats at Pro Football Reference

George Cardinal "Babe" Lyon (March 30, 1907 – December 22, 1970) was a professional football player in the National Football League (NFL) and the second American Football League (AFL). Over the span of his career, Babe played for the New York Giants, Portsmouth Spartans, Cleveland Indians, Chicago Bears, Brooklyn Dodgers, and St. Louis Gunners of the NFL. He played again in 1936 for the Rochester Tigers of the AFL.
