= Missouri Military Academy =

School in Missouri, United States

- Missouri Military Academy; Sesquicentennial Emblem

Location
- 204 North Grand Street; Mexico, Missouri 65265-3020; United States; 39°10′19.1″N 91°52′04.6″W

Information
- School type: Private Preparatory School
- Motto: Diligo, Veneratio, Veritas (Love, Honor, Truth)
- Established: November 22, 1889
- CEEB code: 262195
- NCES School ID: 00755084
- President: Brigadier General Richard V. Geraci, USA (Ret.)
- Dean: Elizabeth Clement
- Commandant: Colonel Timothy Baer, USA (Ret.)
- Faculty: 28.0 (on FTE basis)
- Grades: 7 to 12
- Gender: All male
- Enrollment: 210 (2026-27)
- Student to teacher ratio: 7.5
- Hours in school day: 7.4
- Campus size: 288 acres (117 ha)
- Campus type: Suburban
- Colors: Maroon and gold
- Mascot: The Colonel
- Accreditation: Independent Schools Association of the Central States
- Newspaper: The Eagle
- Yearbook: Taps
- Tuition: US$ 41,614
- Website: missourimilitaryacademy.org

The official military academy of the State of Missouri, Missouri Military Academy is a private, college-preparatory school for boys in Mexico, Missouri, United States. Established in 1889, it is a selective boarding school that teaches students in grades 7 to 12 and offers a post-graduate year option. As a U.S. Army Junior Reserve Officers' Training Corps (JROTC) Honor Unit With Distinction (as designated by the U.S. Department of the Army), it can nominate cadets to the U.S. Military Academy, Naval Academy, Air Force Academy, and Coast Guard Academy.

== History ==
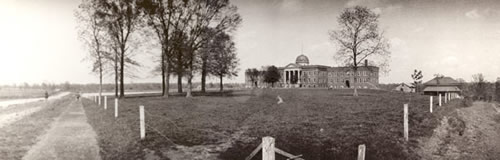
Photograph of MMA, taken c. 1903, during the administration of Colonel William Fonville.

The Missouri Military Academy was established on November 22, 1889, under the leadership of Missouri governor Charles Hardin, who obtained from the "public-spirited citizens of Mexico, Missouri...$16,000 and a beautiful campus of 20 acres (8.1 ha) of land." The academy's first president was Alexander Fleet, a Confederate veteran who was present at Appomattox Court House when General Lee surrendered to General Grant at the conclusion of the American Civil War. From its beginning, the academy was very popular, "placing upon its rolls representatives from every congressional district and 20 states."

The original academy, situated on West Boulevard in Mexico, was destroyed by fire in 1896. In 1900, the school was re-established by the Businessmen's Association of Mexico on its present site at the eastern outskirts of the city. Its location was chosen because of its proximity to Tear Drop Lake.

Subsequent presidents were Alexander Yancey (1900-1902), William Fonville (1903-1911), Walter Kohr (1911-1914), and Emmette Burton (1914-1933). In 1933, an organization headed by Charles Stribling Jr., assumed control. Stribling had been on the faculty since 1920 as teacher, coach, assistant commandant and commandant of cadets. In 1948, Stribling directed the reorganization of the academy into a nonprofit educational corporation governed by a board of trustees of alumni, faculty, and friends.

The Missouri Military Academy Alumni Association and the tradition of Homecoming were rejuvenated in 1955 and operate under the alumni association board of directors.

In 1968, Charles Stribling III, '44, was named president. A member of the faculty for 16 years, Stribling III had served as teacher, coach, commandant, executive officer, and director of alumni affairs, development, and public relations. Stribling Jr., was elevated to the position of chairman of the board of trustees and served in that capacity until his death at age 86, in his 63rd year on the faculty. The administration building, built in 1900 and a historical focal point of the campus, was renamed Stribling Hall by the board of trustees in 1981 in honor of his contributions to the academy, the community, and the nation.

Stribling III was succeeded as MMA president in 1993 by Ronald Kelly, a faculty member since 1969 who had served as a teacher, coach, advisor, director of admissions, and executive officer.

After the 2006–07 school year, Kelly was succeeded by Robert Flanigan, a retired U.S. Marine Corps major general who had been business advisor and commandant of Admiral Farragut Academy in St. Petersburg, Florida. Stribling III stepped down as chairman but remained a member of the board.

In 2012, Charles McGeorge was named president of MMA. McGeorge was the 10th president of Valley Forge Military Academy and College, serving from 2004 to 2010. He came to MMA from McGeorge & Co., a limited liability company he founded in 2010 to provide consulting services to independent schools and colleges.

In 2019, Richard V. Geraci, a retired U.S. Army brigadier general, succeeded McGeorge as MMA's 11th president. Geraci joined MMA as chief academic officer on July 1, 2017. His role was then expanded on March 1, 2018, and his title changed to vice president for academics, operations and planning. He had previously served as the president of Leavenworth Regional Catholic School System and principal of Immaculata High School.

In 2026, the State of Missouri officially designated Missouri Military Academy as the Official Military Academy of the State of Missouri. The designation originated in House Bill 2307, was incorporated into Senate Bill 1544, and was ultimately enacted through House Bill 2576.

== Buildings ==
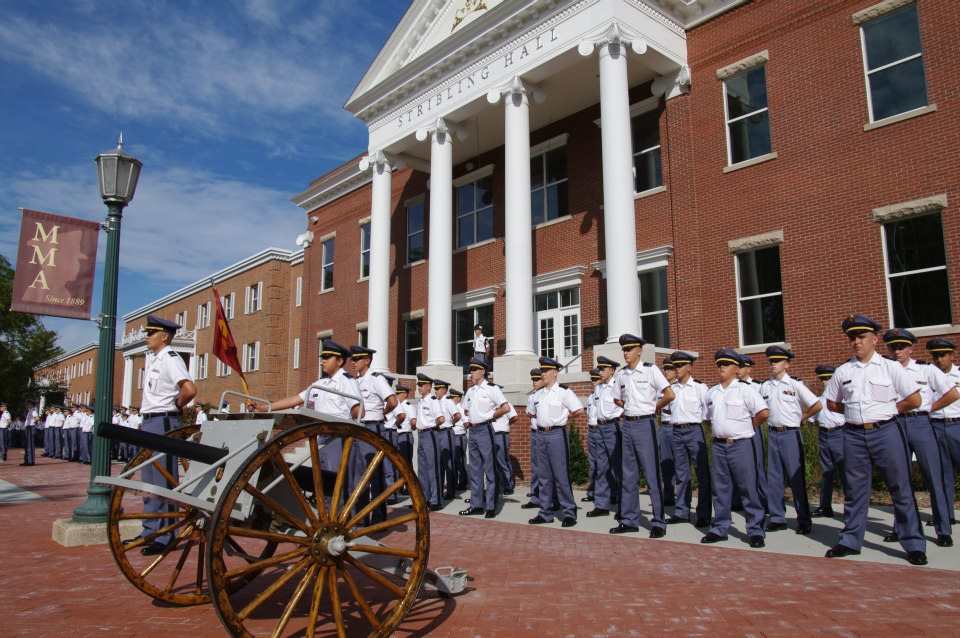
Cadets stand in formation in front of Stribling Hall.

The campus was expanded by the completion of the Junior School Academic Building (1956), the Little Field House (1957), the Academic Building (1958), the Memorial Chapel (1961), the Administration Building annex (1963), Cadet Hospital (1964), the Field House (1967), "E" Barracks (1968), an Academic Building addition (1969), the Natatorium (1981), a Junior School Academic Building addition (1982), the Centennial Gymnatorium (1988), the new "D" Barracks (1991), the Maintenance Building (1992), an all-weather track and soccer field (1993), Brad Calvert Field (1994), the new "C" Barracks (1995), the Laundry Building (1996), the new "B" Barracks (2002), Rappelling Tower (2002), and an Academic Building addition (2009). This latest addition was the first high school building in Missouri to receive a Leadership in Energy and Environmental Design certification by the U.S. Green Building Council. The building, named "Barnard Hall" after Les Barnard, '48, was completed in time for the opening of school. In 2012, the reconstruction of Stribling Hall was completed and the building fitted with a new gold dome, one of few in Missouri.

== School life ==
In 1985, MMA was designated as an "Exemplary Private School" by the U.S. Department of Education. The academy is a College Board test center for central Missouri. In 2003, the academic program was expanded to include dual-credit courses, allowing cadets to accumulate college credit hours while fulfilling high school requirements. School year 2007-2008 saw the incorporation of the academy's first National Honor Society chapter. The Academy is a Project Lead the Way school, and cadets may earn membership in the National STEM Honor Society. MMA cadets in the Academy's Army JROTC cyber program finished first in the Missouri Cybersecurity Challenge Capture the Flag competition in Feb. 2026.

MMA offers 11 varsity sports and regularly wins state military school championships. The Colonels Soccer team advanced to the Missouri State Class 1 finals in 2024, finishing second, the team's best finish in school history. In addition, there are athletic opportunities for all cadets in the Army JROTC Raiders Program, physical education, horseback riding, and intramural sports. The MMA Raiders team finished third in the nation in the Challenge Level Male Division at the 2026 JROTC National Raider Challenge. The competitive JROTC drill team (the Fusileers), the marching band, and color guard have represented the state of Missouri in presidential inaugural parades, and they have performed at televised college and professional sporting events. The Fusileers also represent MMA at the National High School Drill Team Championships where they have been nationally ranked.

== Notable alumni ==
- Maxie Anderson (1934–1983), U.S. Congressional Gold Medal recipient
- Randall Carver (born 1946), American film and television actor
- Clifton Cates (1893–1970), 19th Commandant of the U.S. Marine Corps
- Dale Dye (born 1944), American film and television actor, advisor, writer
- Howard Hughes, Sr. (1869–1924), founder of Hughes Tool Company
- Albert C. Hunt (1888-1956), Associate Justice of the Oklahoma Supreme Court.
- Jess Larson (1904–1987), 1st Administrator of the U.S. General Services
- Ed Lindenmeyer (1901–1981), College All-America Team football tackle
- Judd Lyons (born 1962), Senior officer of the Army National Guard
- "Reb" Russell (1905–1978), American football running back and film actor
- Guy Troy (1923-2023), American modern pentathlete and summer olympian

== See also ==
- List of boarding schools
- List of high schools in Missouri
- List of U.S. military schools and academies
