= John Rogers (American football center) =

American football player (1910–1968)

Profile
- Position: Center

Personal information
- Born: January 18, 1910; Alexis, Illinois, U.S.
- Died: October 1, 1968 (aged 58)
- Listed height: 5 ft 8 in (1.73 m)
- Listed weight: 208 lb (94 kg)

Career information
- High school: Alexis (IL)
- College: Notre Dame

Career history
- Cincinnati Reds (1933–1934)

Awards and highlights
- 2× National champion (1929, 1930)
- Stats at Pro Football Reference

John Bert Rogers (January 18, 1910 – October 1, 1968) was an American football player. Rogers was born in Alexis, Illinois, in 1907 and attended Alexis High School. He played college football at Notre Dame and professional football in the National Football League (NFL) as a center for the Cincinnati Reds in 1933 and 1934. He appeared in 14 NFL games, 11 as a starter. He died in 1968 at age 58.
