= Dick Frahm =

American football player (1906–1977)

Profile
- Position: Halfback

Personal information
- Born: April 11, 1906; Liberty, Nebraska
- Died: October 19, 1977 (aged 71); St. Louis, Missouri
- Listed weight: 187 lb (85 kg)

Career information
- College: Nebraska

Career history
- 1932: Staten Island Stapletons
- 1934: St. Louis/Kansas City Blues
- 1935: Boston Redskins
- 1935: Philadelphia Eagles

Herald Samuel Frahm (April 11, 1906 – October 19, 1977) was an American football halfback for the Staten Island Stapletons, the Boston Redskins, and the Philadelphia Eagles of the National Football League and the St. Louis/Kansas City Blues of the 1934 version of the American Football League. He played college football at the University of Nebraska.

He coached the St. Louis Gunners during the 1937 season of the MFL.
