= Don Moses =

American football player (1906–1965)

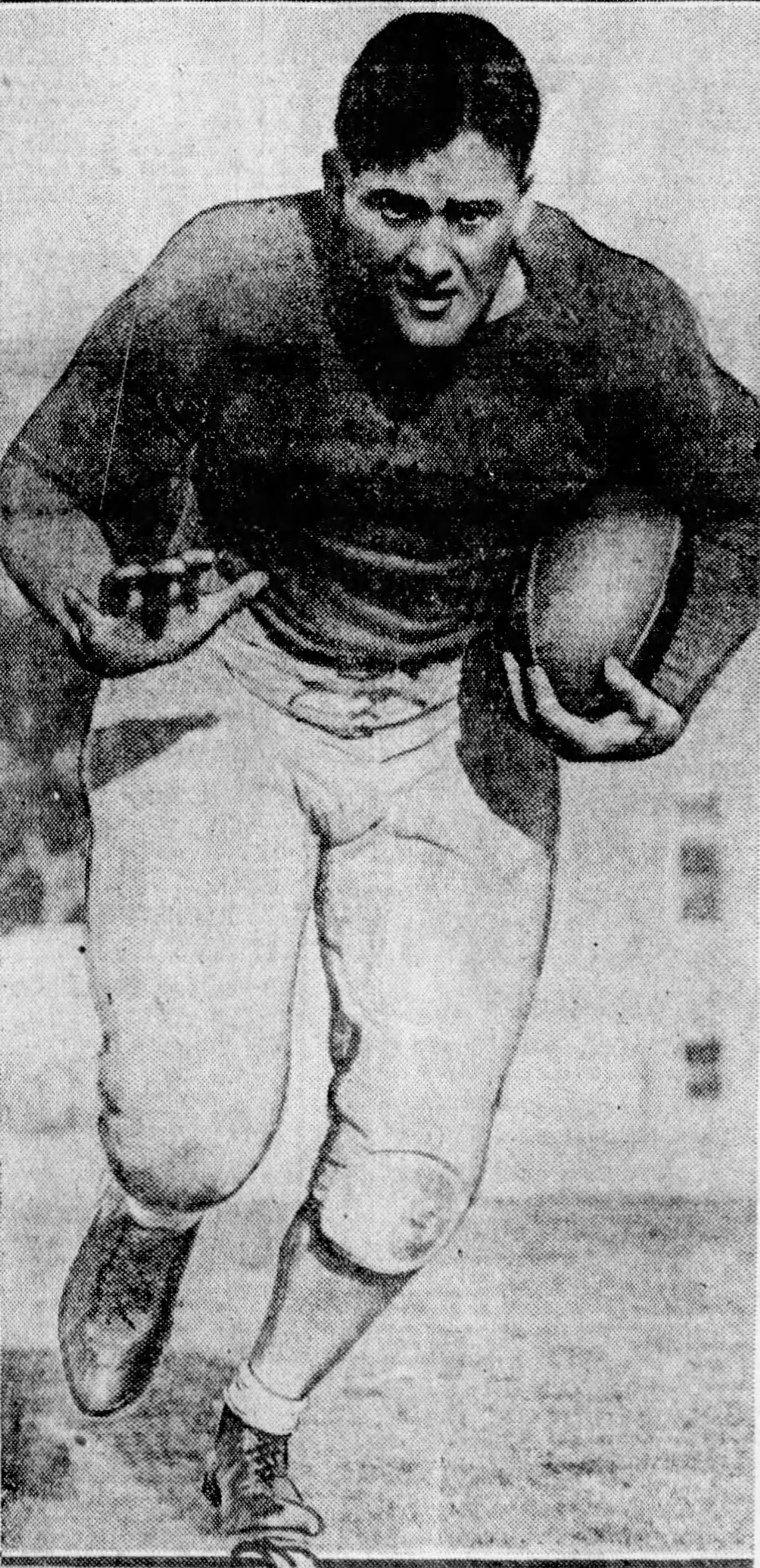
- Don Moses at USC, 1929

Profile
- Position: Back

Personal information
- Born: January 14, 1906; Seattle
- Died: June 15, 1965 (aged 59); Arcadia, California
- Listed height: 5 ft 11 in (1.80 m)
- Listed weight: 185 lb (84 kg)

Career information
- High school: Los Angeles (CA)
- College: USC

Career history
- Cincinnati Reds (1933)

Donald Clyde Moses (January 14, 1906 – June 15, 1965) was an American football player.

Moses was born in Seattle in 1906. He attended Los Angeles High School and the University of Southern California. He played college football as a fullback for the USC Trojans football team in 1927 and 1929. He missed the 1928 season with academic problems. He was described as "one of the sweetest players in the wide, wide West . . . of the powerful, crashing type -- spectacular to the nth degree."

He left college early and played for the Los Angeles Fire Department football team in 1930 and 1931.

He played professional football in the National Football League (NFL) as a back for the Cincinnati Reds. He appeared in three NFL games during the 1933 season. He also played for Ernie Pinkert's All-Stars in 1933.

Moses died of an apparent heart attack in 1965 at age 59 while golfing at Santa Anita Golf Course in Arcadia, California.
