= Clifton B. Cates =

United States Marine Corps four-star general (1893–1970)

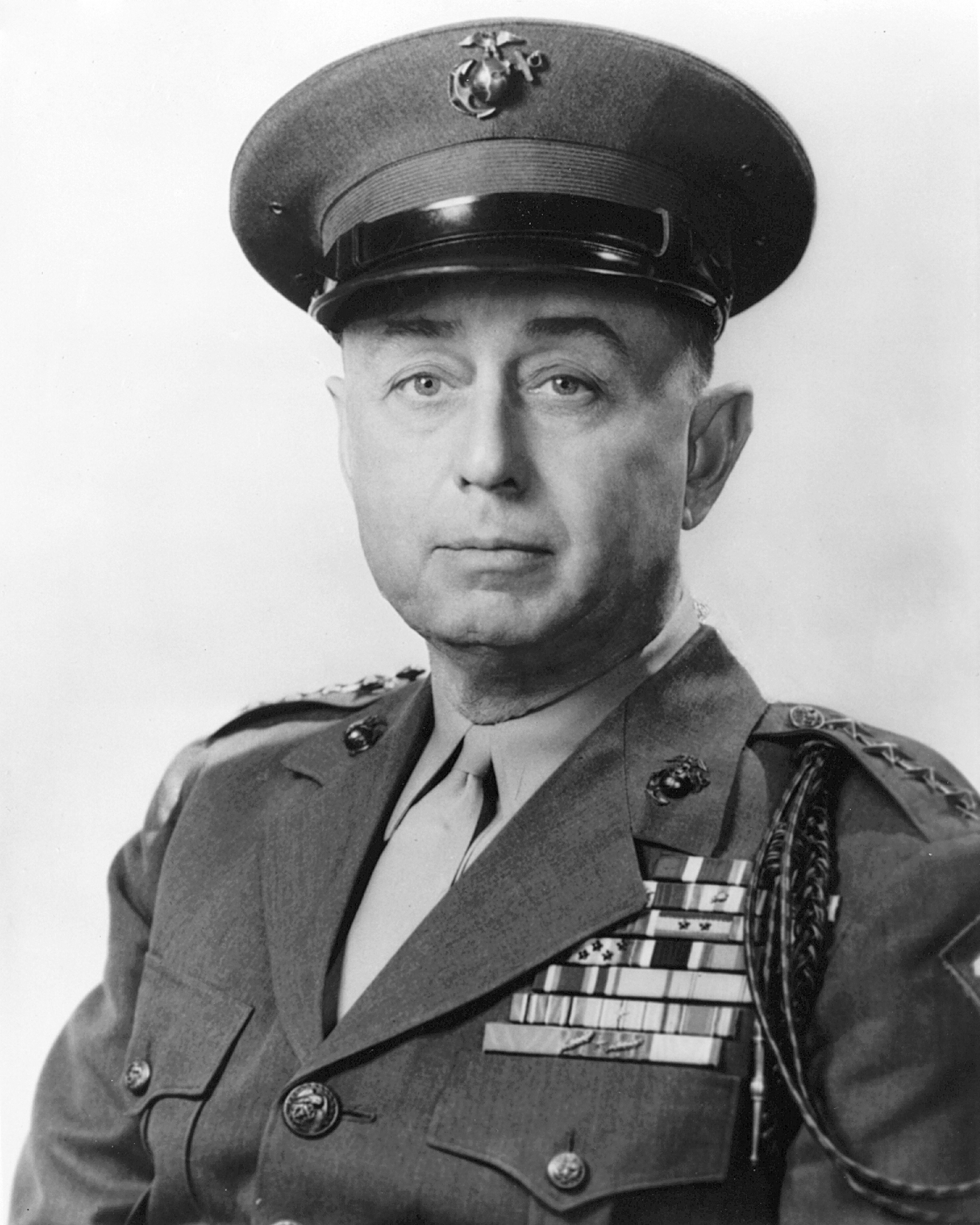
- General Clifton B. Cates
- Born: August 31, 1893; Tiptonville, Tennessee, US
- Died: June 4, 1970 (aged 76); Annapolis, Maryland, US
- Burial place: Arlington National Cemetery
- Spouse: Jane McIlhenny
- Military career
- Allegiance: United States
- Branch: United States Marine Corps
- Service years: 1917–1954
- Rank: General
- Nickname: "Lucky"
- Commands: Commandant of the Marine Corps; 4th Marine Division; 1st Marine Regiment; 2nd Battalion, 4th Marines; 2nd Battalion, 7th Marines
- Conflicts: World War I; Battle of Belleau Wood; World War II; Battle of Guadalcanal; Mariana and Palau Islands campaign; Battle of Tinian; Battle of Iwo Jima
- Awards: Navy Cross; Distinguished Service Cross (2); Navy Distinguished Service Medal (2); Silver Star (4); Legion of Merit; Purple Heart; Knight of the Legion of Honor (France); Croix de Guerre (France); Grand Officer of the Order of Orange-Nassau (Netherlands)
- Other work: National Campaign Chairman, United Service Organizations

Clifton Bledsoe Cates (August 31, 1893 – June 4, 1970) was an American general who served as the 19th Commandant of the Marine Corps from 1948 to 1951, holding the rank of a United States Marine Corps four-star general. He earned recognition for his heroism during World War I at the Battle of Belleau Wood and for his exceptional leadership during the Battle of Iwo Jima in World War II. Cates is widely regarded as one of the most distinguished young officers of World War I. His remarkable career included commanding a platoon, a company, a battalion, a regiment, and a division, making him one of the few officers across all branches of service to have achieved this feat in combat.

== Early life ==
Clifton Bledsoe Cates was born August 31, 1893, in Tiptonville, Tennessee. After graduating from the Missouri Military Academy in 1910, and the University of Tennessee College of Law in 1916 with a Bachelor of Law degree, he was admitted to the Tennessee Bar. Cates was a member of the Kappa Tau Chapter of Phi Gamma Delta.

== Military career ==
With the entry of the United States into World War I, Cates was commissioned as second lieutenant in the Marine Corps Reserves. He began active duty on June 13, 1917.

=== World War I ===
During World War I, Cates served with the 6th Marine Regiment, fighting in France. For his heroism in the Aisne defensive at Boursches and Belleau Wood, he was awarded the Navy Cross, the Distinguished Service Cross with oak leaf cluster—one of only nine Marines to receive two in World War I—in addition to the Purple Heart. He was awarded a Silver Star for his gallantry at Soissons. Cates was also recognized by the French government with the Legion of Honor, one of the greatest compliments that could be paid any officer, and the Croix de Guerre with Gilt Star and two palms. At Belleau Wood, June 6, 1918, Cates' company was ordered to attack the village of [Bouresches] The company commander was soon mortally wounded, leaving Cates in charge despite his not knowing the attack's intent or objective. Cates organized the available men of his company as well as some other Marines in the vicinity and carried out a successful attack, and subsequent defense of the village. The Germans responded with mustard gas nearly wiping out the entire company. Cates was reassigned to the 80th Company until replacements could reconstitute his 96th. On July 19, 1918, at the Battle of Soissons, most of Cates' company along with the 2nd Battalion was annihilated. The enemy artillery was so intense that Cates lost most of his britches in an explosion that nearly cost him his life. After capturing an old abandoned French trench, he sent a runner to his battalion headquarters with a situation report which read: "From Co. "H" At:? Date: July 19. Hour 10:45A.M. To: Lt. Col Lee. "I am in an old abandoned French trench bordering on the road leading out of your P.C. and 350 yards from an old mill. I have only two men out of my company. We need support, but it is almost suicide to try and get it here as we are swept by machine-gun fire and a constant barrage is on us. I have no one on my left and only a few on my right. I WILL HOLD." "I will hold" became the phrase most identified with Cates as he advanced through the ranks, and is recognized throughout the Marine Corps as a battle cry or slogan intended to improve morale and inspire confidence.

=== Interbellum ===
Cates returned to the United States in September 1919 after occupation duties in Germany. He was prepared to resign his commission until dissuaded by Major General George Barnett, who took Cates on as his aide-de-camp and he served as a White House aide. In 1920, he stayed as Barnett's aide and followed him to San Francisco, California. From 1923 to 1925, Cates served a tour of sea duty as commander of the Marine Detachment aboard the USS California (BB-44).

In 1929, Cates was deployed to Shanghai, China, where he rejoined the 4th Marines for three years. He then returned to the United States for training at the Army Industrial College and in the Senior Course in the Marine Corps Schools. In 1935, Cates was assigned to the War Plans Section of the Division of Operations and Training at Headquarters Marine Corps (HQMC). In 1936, he returned to Shanghai as a battalion commander with the 6th Marine Regiment. In 1938, he rejoined the 4th Marines in Shanghai.

In 1940, Cates was named the director of the Marine Officers Basic School at the Philadelphia Navy Yard. In 1942, Colonel Cates took command of the 1st Marine Regiment.

=== World War II ===
Cates led the 1st Marines at Guadalcanal, for which he was awarded the Legion of Merit with Combat "V". He then assumed command of the 4th Marine Division in the Marianas operation, the Tinian campaign and the seizure of Iwo Jima. For his services at Tinian, Cates received the Navy Distinguished Service Medal and a Gold Star in lieu of a second award for his service at Iwo Jima. The planning for Tinian included the first complete aerial reconnaissance of an enemy base by the key commanders, including Cates. Near the end of the fighting at Iwo Jima, Cates attempted to persuade the remaining Japanese brigade to surrender honorably rather than fight to the death.

After his first tour of duty in the Pacific, Cates returned to the United States to serve as commandant of the Marine Corps Schools at Quantico until 1944. He then returned to the Pacific theater until the end of the war as commander of the 4th Marine Division.

=== Commandant ===
On January 1, 1948, Cates was sworn in as the 19th commandant of the Marine Corps and promoted to the rank of general. He served as commandant for four years, and fought the budgetary erosion of the Fleet Marine Force. As commandant, Cates continued the push to enlarge the corps' standing forces, eventually getting legislation placing the corps' active strength at three divisions and three air wings, and he brought the first helicopters into service on a test basis of the "new concept" in the Korean War—the usage of which would make an impression on the commander of the FMF, Pacific, his eventual successor as commandant, General Lemuel C. Shepherd, Jr. Shepherd and Cates would revive the amphibious assault at Inchon.

Upon completion of his tour as commandant of the Marine Corps, Cates was reverted to his then permanent rank of lieutenant general and was reassigned to serve again as commandant of the Marine Corps Schools. He retired on June 30, 1954, and was eventually promoted on the retired list to the rank of full general. After retirement he was chairman of the National Campaign of the United Service Organizations for two years.

== Death and legacy ==
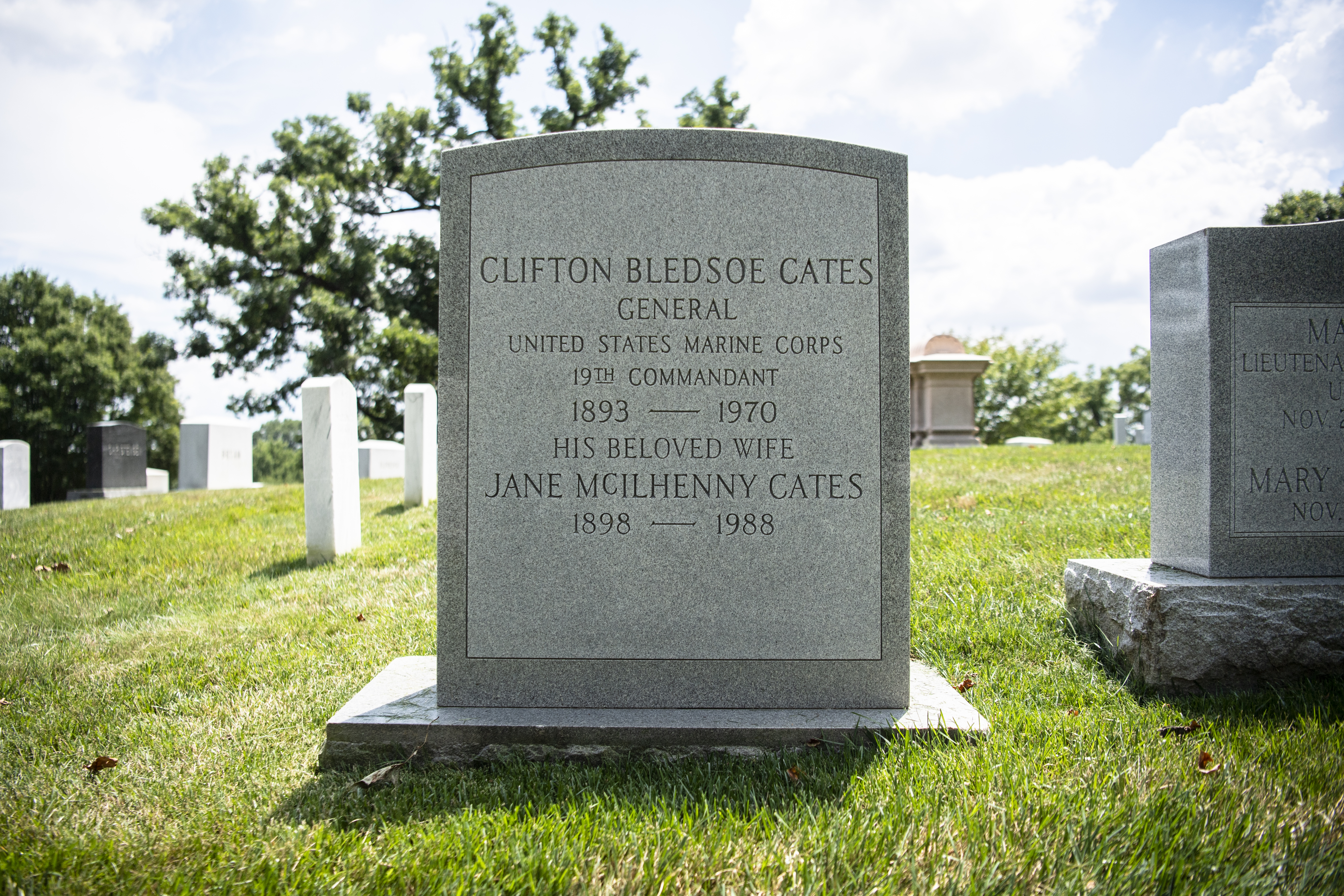
Gravesite of U.S. Marine Corps General Clifton Cates in Section 5 of Arlington National Cemetery in 2023

Cates died June 4, 1970, at the United States Naval Hospital, Annapolis, Maryland, after a long illness. He was buried with full military honors on June 8, 1970, at Arlington National Cemetery.

General Cates also held doctoral law degrees from the University of Tennessee and the University of Chattanooga.

Cates' high school alma mater, the Missouri Military Academy in Mexico, Missouri, honored his memory with the creation of the "General Clifton B. Cates 'I Will Hold' Award for Leadership" during the academy's 125th anniversary celebration in 2014. The award specifically recognizes the leadership traits of perseverance and determination.

== Dates of rank ==
Rank	Date
Second Lieutenant	May 24, 1917 (Provisional/Reserves)
Second Lieutenant	Sep, 18, 1917 (Temporary)
First Lieutenant	July 1, 1918 (Temporary); Aug, 28, 1918 (authorized-Temporary)
Captain	Mar, 5, 1919-Sep, 25, 1919 (temporary); Mar, 21, 1921 (appointed-Temporary); Apr, 2, 1921 (permanent); Jun, 4, 1920 (official, retroactive, date of rank)
Major	Oct, 1, 1931
Lieutenant Colonel	July 1, 1935 authorized on July 26, 1935
Colonel	Apr, 1, 1940
Brigadier General	Sep, 16, 1942 (temporary); Apr, 3, 1943 (permanent)
Major General	Feb, 1, 1944 authorized on June 23, 1944
Lieutenant General	Jan, 1, 1952
General	While serving as Commandant (until Dec 31, 1951); Dec, 31, 1947 (appointed); Jan 28, 1948 (commission)
General	Jun 30, 1954 (on retired list)

== Assignments ==
Unit or Assignment	Dates
96th Co (H&SC), 2/6	28 Aug 1917 – 1 May 1919
Co. "E", Composite Regiment	1 May 1919 – 19 Sep 1919
Marine Barracks, Washington, D.C.	20 Sep 1919 – 14 Feb 1920
Aide-de-camp to Commandant Barnett, Headquarters, U.S. Marine Corps & to President Wilson's White House	14 Feb 1920 – 8 Oct 1920
Aide-de-camp to Gen. Barnett, commanding general of Department of the Pacific, San Francisco, CA	15 Nov 1920 – 10 June 1923
Commander, Marine detachment, USS California (BB-44)	10 June 1923 – 29 Apr 1925
4th Marines	9 May 1925 – 26 May 1926
Recruiting Station, Spokane, WA	1 July 1926 – 1 May 1927
Recruiting Station, Omaha, NE	6 May 1927 – 23 Feb 1928
American Battle Monuments Commission, Washington, D.C.	6 Mar 1928 – 3 May 1929
4th Marines, Shanghai, China	5 Aug 1929 – 6 Jun 1932
inc. athletic officer, 4th Marines 6 Sep 1929 – 6 Jun 1932
attending Army Industrial College	17 Aug 1932 – 23 Jun 1933
CO 2d Bn, 7th Marines, FMF, serving off Cuba and the Caribbean	1933/1934
attending Marine Corps Schools, Quantico, VA	10 Sep 1934 – 26 Jul 1935
War Plans, Operations, and Training, Headquarters, Marine Corps	30 Sep 1935 – 24 May 1937
2/5, 2d Brigade, FMF	30 Jun 1937 – 1 Feb 1938 (CO from Sep)
CO, 2/4	1 Feb 1938 – 18 May 1939
XO, 4th Marines	18 May 1939 – 6 June 1939
attending Army War College, Washington, D.C.	1 Sep 1939 – 22 June 1940
Director, Marine Officers Basic School, Navy Yard, Philadelphia, PA	6 July 1940 – 23 Apr 1942
on Maneuvers with Amphibious Force, Atlantic Fleet 5 Jan – 16 Jan 1942
CO, 1st Marines, 1st Marine Division	3 May 1942 – 11 Feb 1943
Commandant, Marine Corps Schools, Quantico, VA	March 1943 – 20 Jun 1944
Command of 4th Marine Division	12 Jul 1944 – 19 Nov 1945
President, Marine Corps Equipment Board, Quantico, VA	14 Jan 1946 – ?
Commanding general, Marine Barracks, Quantico	1 Jun 1946 – 1 Jan 1948
Senior member of board, Headquarters, U.S. Marine Corps, Washington, D.C.	24 Jun 1946 – ?
President, advisory board, Marine Barracks, Quantico, VA	24 Jan 1947 –
Commandant of the Marine Corps	31 Dec 1947 – 31 Dec 1951
Commandant, Marine Corps Schools, Quantico, VA	31 Dec 1951 – 30 Jun 1954
President, JLFB	? – 30 Jun 1952

== Awards and decorations ==
Cates was the recipient of the following awards:

1st Row		Navy Cross			French Fourragère
2nd Row	Distinguished Service Cross w/ 1 oak leaf cluster	Navy Distinguished Service Medal w/ 1 star	Silver Star w/ 3 stars	Legion of Merit w/ valor device	French Fourragère
3rd Row	Purple Heart w/ 1 star	Navy Presidential Unit Citation w/ 3 stars	Navy Unit Commendation	World War I Victory Medal w/ 3 Silver Navy Commendation Stars & 5 campaign stars	French Fourragère
4th Row	Army of Occupation of Germany Medal	Marine Corps Expeditionary Medal	Yangtze Service Medal	China Service Medal	French Fourragère
5th Row	American Defense Service Medal	American Campaign Medal	Asiatic-Pacific Campaign Medal with four Bronze Stars	World War II Victory Medal	French Fourragère
6th Row	National Defense Service Medal	Croix de Guerre w/ Gilt Star & 2 palms	Legion of Honor, Knight grade	Order of Orange-Nassau, rank of Grand Officer w/ crossed swords	French Fourragère

=== Navy Cross citation ===
Citation:

The President of the United States of America takes pleasure in presenting the Navy Cross to First Lieutenant Clifton Bledsoe Cates (MCSN: 0-155), United States Marine Corps, for extraordinary heroism while serving with the 96th Company, 6th Regiment (Marines), 2d Division, A.E.F. in action near Chateau-Thierry, France, 6 June 1918. While advancing with his company on the town of Bouresches their progress was greatly hindered by withering machine-gun and artillery fire of the enemy which caused many casualties, one of whom was his commanding officer. Taking command, Captain Cates led them on to the objective despite the fact that he was rendered temporarily unconscious by a bullet striking his helmet and that this was his first engagement. Exposing himself to the extreme hazard, he reorganized his position with but a handful of men.

=== First Distinguished Service Cross citation ===
Citation:

The President of the United States of America, authorized by Act of Congress, July 9, 1918, takes pleasure in presenting the Distinguished Service Cross to Captain Clifton Bledsoe Cates (MCSN: 0-155), United States Marine Corps, for extraordinary heroism while serving with the Ninety-Sixth Company, Sixth Regiment (Marines), 2d Division, A.E.F., in action near Chateau-Thierry, France, 6 June 1918. While advancing with his company on the town of Bouresches their progress was greatly hindered by withering machine-gun and artillery fire of the enemy which caused many casualties, one of whom was his commanding officer. Taking command, Captain Cates led them on to the objective despite the fact that he was rendered temporarily unconscious by a bullet striking his helmet and that this was his first engagement. Exposing himself to the extreme hazard, he reorganized his position with but a handful of men.

=== Second Distinguished Service Cross citation ===
Citation:

The President of the United States of America, authorized by Act of Congress, July 9, 1918, takes pleasure in presenting a Bronze Oak Leaf Cluster in lieu of a Second Award of the Distinguished Service Cross to Captain Clifton Bledsoe Cates (MCSN: 0-155), United States Marine Corps, for extraordinary heroism while serving with the Ninety-Sixth Company, Sixth Regiment (Marines), 2d Division, A.E.F., in action near Bois-de-Belleau, France, June 13–14, 1918. During the night, a severe gas attack made it necessary to evacuate practically the entire personnel of two companies, including officers. Captain Cates, suffering painfully from wounds, refused evacuation remaining and rendering valuable assistance to another company.

== See also ==
- List of United States Marine Corps four-star generals

Military offices
Preceded by Harry Schmidt	Commanding General 4th Marine Division; 1944–1945	Post deactivated
Preceded by Alexander A. Vandegrift	Commandant of the Marine Corps; 1948–1951	Succeeded by Lemuel C. Shepherd, Jr.
