= 1926 All-Missouri Valley Conference football team =

The 1926 All-Missouri Valley Conference football team consists of American football players chosen by various organizations for All-Missouri Valley Conference teams for the 1926 college football season. The selectors for the 1926 season included the Associated Press (AP).

== All-Missouri Valley selections ==
=== Ends ===
- Carl Bacchus, Missouri (AP-1)
- Roland Coe, Iowa State (AP-1)
- Roy LeCrone, Oklahoma (AP-2)
- Chuck Delmege, Drake (AP-2)

=== Tackles ===
- Lon Stiner, Nebraska (AP-1)
- Ed Lindenmeyer, Missouri (AP-1)
- Martin, Grinell (AP-2 [also as guard])

=== Guards ===
- Harold Weissinger, Oklahoma A&M (AP-1)
- Simon Tombaugh, Kansas State (AP-1)
- Ralph J. Studebaker, Missouri (AP-2)

=== Centers ===
- Polly Wallace, Oklahoma (AP-1)
- Lewis Davidson, Kansas (AP-2)

=== Quarterbacks ===
- Bert Clark, Missouri (AP-1)
- Gordon Peery, Oklahoma A&M (AP-2)

=== Halfbacks ===
- Frank Potts, Oklahoma (AP-1)
- Glenn Presnell, Nebraska (AP-1)
- Joe Holsinger, Kansas State (AP-2)
- Chuck Everett, Drake (AP-2)

=== Fullbacks ===
- Gordon "Butch" Meeter, Grinnell (AP-1)
- Blue Howell, Nebraska (AP-2)

== Key ==
AP = Associated Press

== See also ==
- 1926 College Football All-America Team
