= Frosty Peters =

American football player (1904–1980)

No. 1, 32
- Position: Back

Personal information
- Born: April 22, 1904; Creston, Iowa, U.S.
- Died: April 17, 1980 (aged 75); Decatur, Illinois, U.S.
- Listed height: 5 ft 10 in (1.78 m)
- Listed weight: 183 lb (83 kg)

Career information
- College: Montana State; Illinois

Career history

Playing
- Providence Steam Roller (1930); Portsmouth Spartans (1930); Brooklyn Dodgers (1931); Chicago Cardinals (1932); Memphis Tigers (1932–1934)

Coaching
- Memphis Tigers (1933–1934)

Awards and highlights
- First-team All-Big Ten (1929)
- Stats at Pro Football Reference

Forrest Ingram "Frosty" Peters (April 22, 1904 – April 17, 1980) was an American football player who played three seasons in the National Football League (NFL) with the Providence Steam Rollers, Portsmouth Spartans, Brooklyn Dodgers and Chicago Cardinals. He played college football at Montana State and Illinois. He was known for his drop kicking ability.

== College career ==
Peters played for the Montana State Bobcats of Montana State College in 1924. He converted 17 drop kicks into field goals in a game between the Bobcats' freshman team and Billings Polytechnic Institute. The Bobcats won the game by a score of 64–0. The Bobcats helped him set up his drop kicks by falling short of the goal line instead of scoring. Peters also made 15 drop kicks in a game once. Montana State athletic director Schubert Dyche said that "We agreed that every time we got inside the 30-yard line. Frosty would drop kick one."

He transferred to play for the Illinois Fighting Illini of the University of Illinois in 1925, where he was a part of the Illini freshman football team. He was heralded by some to be a potential successor to Red Grange. Peters lettered in football for the Illini in 1926, 1928 and 1929. He sat out the 1927 season due to a knee injury. He helped lead the Illini to the outdoor national championship as a member of the 1927 track and field team. Peters played in the 1930 East–West Shrine Game.

== Professional football career ==
Peters played for the Providence Steam Roller and Portsmouth Spartans of the NFL in 1930. He then played for the NFL's Brooklyn Dodgers in 1931 and the Chicago Cardinals of the NFL in 1932. He played for the Memphis Tigers from 1932 to 1934. Peters was also coach of the Tigers from 1933 to 1934, serving as a player-coach. He was named second-team all-league by the coaches while playing for the Tigers of the American Football League in 1934. He was also later a player-coach with the St. Louis Gunners. Peters was head coach of the St. Louis Blues in 1935.

== Professional baseball career ==
Peters spent time playing professional baseball in the 1930s. He attended George Barr umpire school in Hot Springs, Arkansas. He spent time as a baseball umpire, serving in the Florida State League and then the American Association (AA). Peters's stint in the AA was interrupted by service in World War II. He was a sergeant during World War II and spent time instructing trainees at an army air forces technical training command detachment at the University of Michigan. He was assaulted by an AA manager in 1946. Peters then resigned, stating that "when an umpire gets socked and they fine the guy only $100 and five days, it's an open invitation for everybody in the league to start punching you around."
