= Seaman Squyres =

American football player (1910–1979)

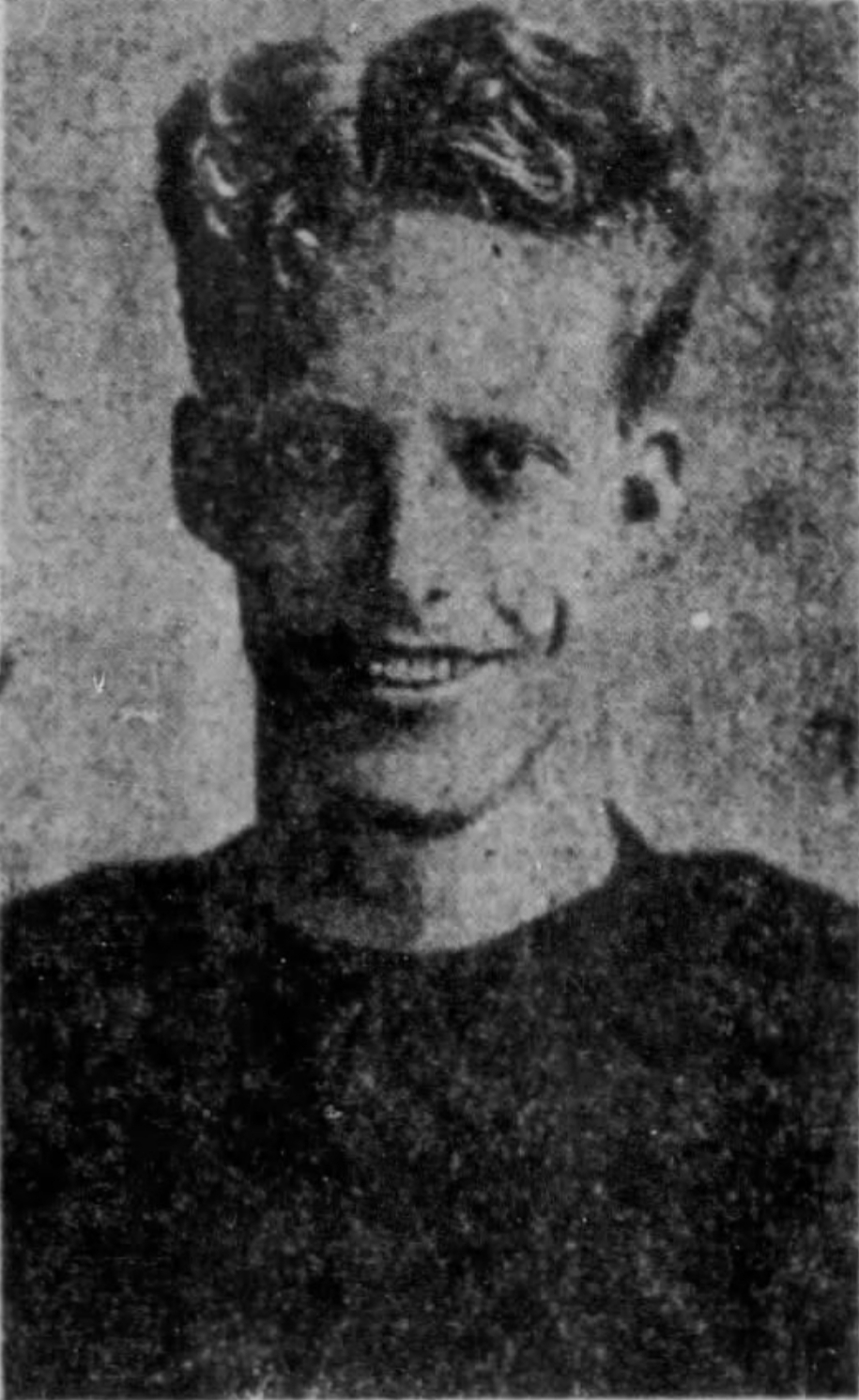
- Squyres in high school

No. 47
- Position: Halfback

Personal information
- Born: March 2, 1910; Shawnee, Oklahoma, U.S.
- Died: November 30, 1979 (aged 69); Fort Bend County, Texas, U.S.
- Listed height: 6 ft 2 in (1.88 m)
- Listed weight: 205 lb (93 kg)

Career information
- High school: Cleburne (Cleburne, Texas)
- College: Rice (1929–1931)

Career history
- Battery A Gunners (1932); Cincinnati Reds (1933)
- Stats at Pro Football Reference

Charles Seaman Squyres (March 2, 1910 – November 30, 1979) was an American professional football halfback who played one season with the Cincinnati Reds of the National Football League (NFL). He played college football at Rice Institute.

== Early life ==
Charles Seaman Squyres was born on March 2, 1910, in Shawnee, Oklahoma. He was the son of Mr. and Mrs. J. E. Squyres. In 1923, at the age of 13, he started attending Cleburne High School in Cleburne, Texas. He trained with the track team in spring 1924 and with the football team in fall 1924. However, he was not actually a member of either team at the time as he was still too young. He played fullback on the school's football team from 1925 to 1928. He rushed, passed, blocked, and punted at Cleburne, earning All-State honors. On December 13, 1928, Squyres was declared ineligible for the rest of the season by the local Interscholastic League. This was due to Squyres having accidentally filled in "blanks" that stated he participated in high school sports in 1924 despite not actually being on any team that year.

== College career ==
Squyres enrolled at Rice Institute in 1929 to play college football for the Rice Owls. However, he suffered a head injury that year. He did not play much in 1930 due to having suffered multiple injuries during practice but he did end up earning a varsity letter for the season. Squyres played more during his junior year at Rice in 1931 and earned his second varsity letter. He left Rice after the 1931 season, with one year of college football eligibility remaining.

== Professional career ==
Squyres played for the independent Battery A Gunners in 1932.

Squyres played in four games, starting two, for the Cincinnati Reds of the National Football League in 1933, rushing 11 times for 22 yards while also completing two of nine passes for 15 yards and one interception. He wore jersey number 47 while with the Reds. He stood 6'2" and weighed 205 pounds.

== Personal life ==
In May 1933, The Austin American stated that Squyres was a "jack of all trades". In addition to football, he was a capable oilhand, public speaker, and bridge player. In 1939, he married Dorothy Gately in Chicago, Illinois. At the time of the wedding, Squyres had been living in Cucuta, Colombia, as an employee of the Shell Oil Company. It was reported that Gately and Squyres were planning on living together in Cucuta. Squyres died on November 30, 1979, in Fort Bend County, Texas.
