= Ed Lindenmeyer =

American football player and coach (1901–1981)

Profile
- Position: Tackle

Personal information
- Born: July 18, 1901; Wisconsin, U.S.
- Died: July 24, 1981 (aged 80); Atlanta, Georgia, U.S.
- Listed height: 6 ft 2 in (1.88 m)
- Listed weight: 195 lb (88 kg)

Career information
- High school: Missouri Military Academy
- College: Missouri

Awards and highlights
- First-team All-American (1925); Third-team All-American (1926); 2× First-team All-MVC (1925, 1926)

Edgar William Lindenmeyer (July 18, 1901 – July 24, 1981) was an American football player. Lindenmeyer attended the Missouri Military Academy (MMA) before enrolling at the University of Missouri. He played college football at the tackle position for the Missouri Tigers football team from 1924 to 1926. He was selected by the International News Service (INS), Newspaper Enterprise Association (NEA) and several others as a first-team player on the 1925 College Football All-America Team. The Associated Press and All-American Board named a second-team All-American. Lindenmeyer was the University of Missouri's first All-American athlete. He later became a physical education teacher and the head football coach at Lake Forest High School in Lake Forest, Illinois he served as head football coach from 1935 to 1951 and compiled a 96–27–10 record.
