= Bullet Baker =

American football player and coach (1901–1961)

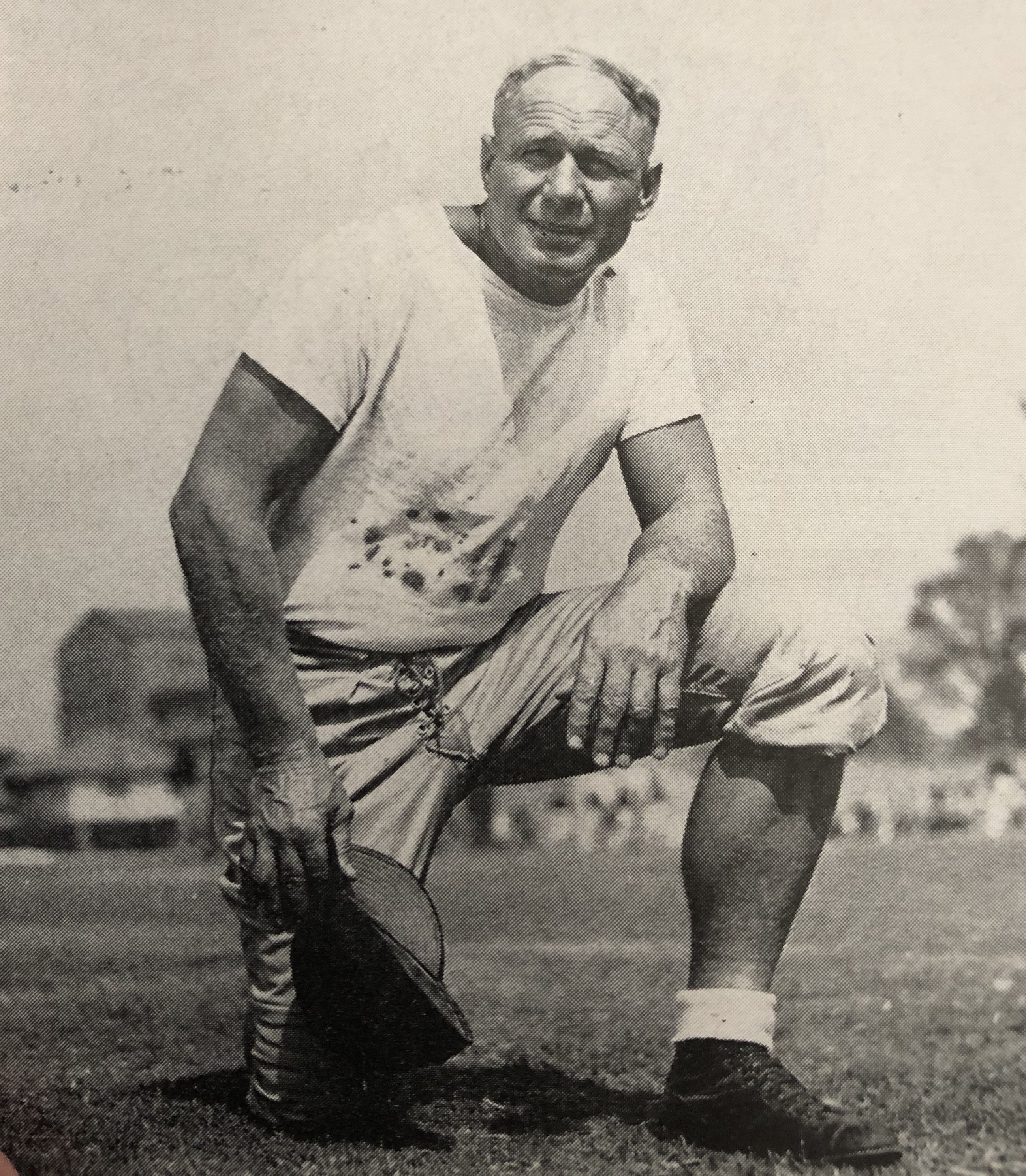
- Baker c. 1949 at USC

Profile
- Positions: Halfback, end, fullback, quarterback

Personal information
- Born: November 6, 1901; Casper, Wyoming, U.S.
- Died: June 18, 1961 (aged 60); Long Beach, California, U.S.
- Listed height: 5 ft 8 in (1.73 m)
- Listed weight: 180 lb (82 kg)

Career information
- High school: Long Beach Polytechnic (CA)
- College: Santa Clara; USC

Career history

Playing
- 1926–1927: New York Yankees
- 1928: Green Bay Packers
- 1929: Chicago Cardinals
- 1929: Green Bay Packers
- 1930: Chicago Cardinals
- 1931: Staten Island Stapletons
- 1931: St. Louis Gunners

Coaching
- 1932: St. Louis Gunners

Awards and highlights
- NFL champion (1929)
- Stats at Pro Football Reference

Roy Marlon "Bullet" Baker (November 6, 1901 – June 18, 1961) was an American professional football player in the National Football League and the first American Football League. Baker started his career at powerhouse Long Beach Polytechnic High School then continued the pipeline to USC. Over the span of his career, Baker played for the Chicago Cardinals, New York Yankees, Green Bay Packers, Staten Island Stapletons of the NFL. Before that played again in 1926 for the Yankees of the AFL. After his NFL career ended he played for the St. Louis Gunners in 1931 and was their coach in 1932. Baker won an NFL Championship in 1929 with the Green Bay Packers.

Baker was a captain in the U.S. Navy.
