= Danny McMullen =

American football player (1906–1983)

No. 0, 21, 11
- Position: Guard

Personal information
- Born: May 8, 1906; Belleville, Kansas, U.S.
- Died: August 22, 1983 (aged 77); St. Francis, Kansas, U.S.
- Listed height: 5 ft 8 in (1.73 m)
- Listed weight: 231 lb (105 kg)

Career information
- High school: Belleville
- College: Nebraska (1925–1928)

Career history
- New York Giants (1929); Chicago Bears (1930–1931); Portsmouth Spartans (1932)

Awards and highlights
- First-team All-American (1928); Third-team All-American (1927); 2× First-team All-Big Six (1927, 1928)

Career statistics
- Games played: 35
- Games started: 18
- Stats at Pro Football Reference

Daniel Edward McMullen (May 8, 1906 – August 22, 1983) was an American football guard. He played college football for the Nebraska Cornhuskers from 1925 to 1928 and was selected by the Associated Press as a second-team All-American. He also played in the National Football League (NFL) for the New York Giants, Chicago Bears and Portsmouth Spartans.

== After NFL ==
He worked for 16 years as the football coach at Turkey Creek High School.

He was inducted into the Nebraska Football Hall of Fame Inductee in 1979.

== After football ==
After retiring, he moved to St. Francis, Kansas, where he died in 1983 at age 77 after falling at his home.
