= Eastern and Western Conferences (NFL) 1933–1969 =

Former divisions of the National Football League

The Eastern and Western Divisions of the National Football League, renamed the American and National Conferences in 1950 and then back to the Eastern and Western Conferences in 1953, were organized as a result of the NFL championship of 1932. NFL owners agreed that henceforth there would be an annual championship game, to be played between the teams with the best records from two divisions, Eastern and Western. The two-division/conference structure remained essentially stable for over 35 years, including the absorption of former All-America Football Conference teams in 1950, and the early expansion teams added in the 1960s in response to the American Football League. With the 1970 AFL–NFL merger the new, larger league was reorganized.

== Teams ==
=== 1933–1949 ===
Eastern Division	Western Division
Boston Redskins (Washington from 1937)	Chicago Bears
Brooklyn Dodgers (Tigers 1944, defunct)	Chicago Cardinals
New York Giants	Cincinnati Reds (1933–34, defunct)
Philadelphia Eagles	Green Bay Packers
Pittsburgh Pirates (Steelers from 1940, merged with Philadelphia (Steagles) in 1943, and Chicago Cardinals (Card-Pitt) in 1944, resuming in 1945)	Portsmouth Spartans (Detroit Lions from 1934)
Boston Yanks (1944–1948, New York Bulldogs 1949)	St. Louis Gunners (1934, defunct)
	Cleveland Rams (1937, suspended operations for one year in 1943, Los Angeles from 1946)

=== 1950–1966 ===
American Conference 1950–1952 Eastern Conference 1953–1966	National Conference 1950–1952 Western Conference 1953–1966
Chicago Cardinals (St. Louis from 1960)	Baltimore Colts (I) (ex-AAFC, 1950, defunct)
Cleveland Browns (ex-AAFC, from 1950)	Chicago Bears
New York Giants	Detroit Lions
Philadelphia Eagles	Green Bay Packers
Pittsburgh Steelers	Los Angeles Rams
Washington Redskins	New York Yanks (1950–51, ex-Bulldogs, Dallas Texans (I) 1952, defunct)
	San Francisco 49ers (ex-AAFC, from 1950)
	Baltimore Colts (II) (from 1953)
Dallas Cowboys (from 1961)	Dallas Cowboys (1960 only)
Atlanta Falcons (1966 only)	Minnesota Vikings (from 1961)

=== 1967–1969 ===
Eastern Conference		Western Conference	
Capitol Division	Century Division	Central Division	Coastal Division
Dallas Cowboys	Cleveland Browns	Chicago Bears	Atlanta Falcons
New Orleans Saints (1967 & 1969)	New York Giants (1967 & 1969)	Detroit Lions	Baltimore Colts (II)
Philadelphia Eagles	Pittsburgh Steelers	Green Bay Packers	Los Angeles Rams
Washington Redskins	St. Louis Cardinals	Minnesota Vikings	San Francisco 49ers
New York Giants (1968 only)	New Orleans Saints (1968 only)		

== Champions ==
=== 1933–1966 ===
Season	Eastern Division	Record	Western Division	Record
1933	New York Giants	11–3	Chicago Bears	10–2–1
1934	New York Giants	8–5	Chicago Bears	13–0
1935	New York Giants	9–3	Detroit Lions	7–3–2
1936	Boston Redskins	7–5	Green Bay Packers	10–1–1
1937	Washington Redskins	8–3	Chicago Bears	9–1–1
1938	New York Giants	8–2–1	Green Bay Packers	8–3
1939	New York Giants	9–1–1	Green Bay Packers	9–2
1940	Washington Redskins	9–2	Chicago Bears	8–3
1941	New York Giants	8–3	Chicago Bears	10–1
1942	Washington Redskins	10–1	Chicago Bears	11–0
1943	Washington Redskins	6–3–1	Chicago Bears	8–1–1
1944	New York Giants	8–1–1	Green Bay Packers	8–2
1945	Washington Redskins	8–2	Cleveland Rams	9–1
1946	New York Giants	7–3–1	Chicago Bears	8–2–1
1947	Philadelphia Eagles	8–4	Chicago Cardinals	9–3
1948	Philadelphia Eagles	9–2–1	Chicago Cardinals	11–1
1949	Philadelphia Eagles	11–1	Los Angeles Rams	8–2–2
Season	American Conference	Record	National Conference	Record
1950	Cleveland Browns	10–2	Los Angeles Rams	9–3
1951	Cleveland Browns	11–1	Los Angeles Rams	8–4
1952	Cleveland Browns	8–4	Detroit Lions	9–3
Season	Eastern Conference	Record	Western Conference	Record
1953	Cleveland Browns	11–1	Detroit Lions	10–2
1954	Cleveland Browns	9–3	Detroit Lions	9–2–1
1955	Cleveland Browns	9–2–1	Los Angeles Rams	8–3–1
1956	New York Giants	8–3–1	Chicago Bears	9–2–1
1957	Cleveland Browns	9–2–1	Detroit Lions	8–4
1958	New York Giants	9–3	Baltimore Colts	9–3
1959	New York Giants	10–2	Baltimore Colts	9–3
1960	Philadelphia Eagles	10–2	Green Bay Packers	8–4
1961	New York Giants	10–3–1	Green Bay Packers	11–3
1962	New York Giants	12–2	Green Bay Packers	13–1
1963	New York Giants	11–3	Chicago Bears	11–1–2
1964	Cleveland Browns	10–3–1	Baltimore Colts	12–2
1965	Cleveland Browns	11–3	Green Bay Packers	10–3–1
1966	Dallas Cowboys	10–3–1	Green Bay Packers	12–2

=== 1967–1969 ===
	Eastern Conference				Western Conference			
Season	Capitol Division	Record	Century Division	Record	Coastal Division	Record	Central Division	Record
1967	Dallas Cowboys	9–5	Cleveland Browns	9–5	Los Angeles Rams	11–1–2	Green Bay Packers	9–4–1
1968	Dallas Cowboys	12–2	Cleveland Browns	10–4	Baltimore Colts	13–1	Minnesota Vikings	8–6
1969	Dallas Cowboys	11–2–1	Cleveland Browns	10–3–1	Los Angeles Rams	11–3	Minnesota Vikings	12–2
