= Cliff Ashburn =

American football player (1905–1989)

No. 7
- Positions: Guard, tackle, end

Personal information
- Born: November 21, 1905; Tilden, Nebraska, U.S.
- Died: September 11, 1989 (aged 83); Scottsbluff, Nebraska, U.S.
- Listed height: 5 ft 11 in (1.80 m)
- Listed weight: 190 lb (86 kg)

Career information
- High school: Tilden (NE)
- College: Nebraska

Career history
- New York Giants (1929)

Awards and highlights
- Second-team All-Big Six (1928)
- Stats at Pro Football Reference

Clifford L. Ashburn (November 21, 1905 – November 9, 1989) was an American professional football player. After playing college football for the Nebraska Cornhuskers, Ashburn played in the National Football League (NFL) for the New York Giants in 1929.
