= St. Louis Gunners =

Defunct American football team in Missouri

Logo

General information
- Founded: 1931
- Folded: 1940
- Stadium: Public Schools Stadium (1931–1933, 1935); Sportsman's Park (1932–1 game, 1934); Francis Field (1932–1 game, 1933–2 games); Walsh Memorial Stadium (1935, 1937); Maplewood High School Stadium (1940)
- Headquartered: St. Louis, Missouri, United States
- Colors: Red, white, blue

Personnel
- General manager: Bud Yates (1931, 1933–1934)
- Head coach: Jimmy Conzelman (1931); Bullet Baker (1932); Gwinn Henry (1933); Chile Walsh (1934); Frosty Peters (1935); Dick Frahm (1937)

Team history
- St. Louis Gunners (1931–1940)

League / conference affiliations
- Independent (1931–1934); National Football League (1934); American Football League (1938–1939); Western Division

The St. Louis Gunners were an independent professional football team based in St. Louis, Missouri, that played the last three games of the 1934 National Football League season, replacing the Cincinnati Reds on the league schedule after the Reds' league membership was suspended. They won their first game against the Pittsburgh Pirates (now Steelers) 6–0, and lost the last two to the Detroit Lions (40–7) and the Green Bay Packers (21–14). Six of the Reds players joined the team for the last two games. The team was headquartered at the St. Louis National Guard Armory, which accounts for its nickname the 'Gunners'.

== History ==
=== Origins ===
In 1931, the 128th Field Artillery of the Missouri National Guard announced through its spokesman that it would sponsor a team for the upcoming football season. The club was originally called the Battery A Gunners from its association with the Guard. Future Hall-of-Famer Jimmy Conzelman, was named the team's first head coach. Bud Yates was named the team's general manager.

=== 1931–1933 ===
The Gunners posted a 5–2–1 record in 1931. However, they lost to the NFL's Chicago Cardinals, 26–6. After the game, Cardinals captain, Ernie Nevers, called the Gunners the "best independent club we have ever faced." A game against a second NFL team, the New York Giants, was scheduled and later canceled that season, to avoid conflict with another game involving a team of Notre Dame All-Stars.

For the team's second season, Bullet Baker was named the team's new coach. While most of the core of the team was kept intact, the Gunners brought in Dick Thornton and Mack Gladden from the University of Missouri. Meanwhile, Yates left the team for the season, for a position with the cross-town St. Louis Veterans. The 1932 Gunners posted a 7–4–1 record. The team was able to play its rival, the Memphis Tigers, to a standoff in three games, St. Louis winning 6–0, Memphis winning 12–0, and the third game ending in a scoreless tie. Later that year, the Tigers, Gunners and the Oklahoma City Chiefs each laid some claim to a mythical "independent championship,". Two of the team's losses that season came against NFL caliber opponents, the Cardinals, 20–7, and the Portsmouth Spartans, 12–0.

By 1933, the team had been renamed the "St. Louis Gunners". Most of the ties the team had with the National Guard had been severed. For example, the players were no longer required to stay at the Battery A barracks, as they had in the past. Dick Frahm, Babe Lyon, and Charley Malone were signed from the Washington Redskins. The team posted an 11–2–3 record in 1933. That year it managed to defeat many of the NFL teams it faced. The Gunners defeated the NFL's Brooklyn Dodgers 21–2, and the Chicago Cardinals 28–7. The team also held the Chicago Bears to a scoreless tie. The team's only two NFL losses of the year came against the Green Bay Packers and the Cincinnati Reds. The team had also managed to outscore its opponents 297–72.

=== Entry into the NFL ===
On August 8, 1934, before the start of the NFL season, St. Louis purchased the NFL's Cincinnati Reds for $20,000. However, the Gunners required the approval of other league owners. Only then would the Gunners would be official members. On August 17, the other owners rejected the Gunners bid to buy the Reds, likely due to the fact that St. Louis was considered too remote compared to the rest of the teams, most of which were in the Northeast, and yearly trips there could have increased travel expenses. Meanwhile, the Gunners declined membership in the minor league American Football League. As a result, the new league decided to form the St. Louis Blues. Gunners GM Bud Yates was credited with founding the team. The Blues lured Dick Frahm away from the Gunners, and took over the lease of Public Schools Stadium. Because or this, the Gunners moved their home games to Sportsman's Park. Meanwhile, Chile Walsh became the team's fourth head coach in four years.

The Gunners started their 1934 season, 5–0 against several semi-pro teams. The team searched desperately for similar teams to compete against. On November 6, 1934, the NFL finally approved the sale of the Cincinnati Reds to St. Louis for $20,000 – $30,000. The Gunners were officially inducted in as members of the NFL, and they were invited to play the Reds' last 3 games of the 1934 NFL season. Two days later, the St. Louis Blues moved to Kansas City, in order to avoid competition with the Gunners for control of the St. Louis fan base.

=== 1934 NFL season ===
The Gunners defeated their first NFL opponent, the Pittsburgh Pirates, 6–0. However, a week later they were defeated by the Detroit Lions 40–7. The team managed to defeat the Pirates again in a 10–0 rematch, but the game, scheduled while the Gunners were still playing independently, was subsequently ruled an exhibition. The Gunners lost to the Packers a week later, 21–14, before dropping another close game to the Dodgers 17–14. The Gunners ended their 1934 season with a 7–0 win over the Kansas City Blues.

The team then moved to the rival American Football League where it folded after a season.

== Season results ==
Year	W	L	T	Finish	Coach
1931	5	2	1		Jimmy Conzelman
1932	7	4	1		Bullet Baker
1933	11	3	2		Gwinn Henry
1934	8	3	2	5th West (NFL)	Chile Walsh
1935					Frosty Peters
1936					
1937	1	4	1	5th (MWFL)	Dick Frahm
1938	4	3	1	2nd (APFA)	Fayne Grone
1939	5	6	0	5th (APFA)	John "Choppy" Rhodes
1940					Jim Kendrick; Mike Sebastian
