= Cincinnati Reds (NFL) =

Defunct National Football League team

General information
- Founded: 1933
- Folded: 1934
- Headquartered: Cincinnati, Ohio, United States
- Colors: Red, white

Personnel
- Owner: M. Scott Kearns
- Head coach: Al Jolley and Mike Palm (1933); Algy Clark (1934)

Team history
- Cincinnati Reds (1933–1934)

League / conference affiliations
- National Football League; Western Division

The Cincinnati Reds were a National Football League team that played the 1933 season and the first eight games of the 1934 season. The football Reds played most of their home games at Crosley Field. Other home games were played at Dayton's Triangle Park, Portsmouth's Universal Stadium and Xavier University's Corcoran Stadium in a rare night game against the Chicago Cardinals.

M. Scott Kearns (1899–1940), a former player at St. Xavier College, was the organizer of the NFL Reds club.

The team was eventually suspended for failure to pay league dues during the 1934 season and the St. Louis Gunners, an independent team, replaced the Reds on the schedule for the last three games.

The Reds hold the dubious distinction of having the two lowest officially recognized season scoring totals in NFL history. In 1933 they scored 38 points in 10 games, tying the 1942 Detroit Lions for second on that list. In 1934 the Reds and Gunners combined for only 37 points in 11 games with the Reds, themselves, scoring only 10 points in 8 games before their suspension. The franchise was shut out in 12 of its 18 games. By comparison, the 75 points scored by the Reds and Gunners in 21 games over two seasons only exceed the 73 points scored by the Chicago Bears in the 1940 NFL Championship Game by two, and by three the 72 points scored by the Washington Redskins on November 27, 1966, the record for points scored by a team in a regular season game. Further, the 1950 Los Angeles Rams averaged 38.83 points per game, the highest such average in NFL history.

These records, however, only consider NFL seasons going back to 1932, the first year in which official statistical records were kept. Several teams failed to score at least 10 points in seasons of varying length (up to 8 games in some cases) between 1920 and 1931.

Alvin J. Jolley was named the team's coach in the summer of 1933.

== Season-by-season ==
Cincinnati Reds
NFL Season	Team History	League	Division	Regular season				References
NFL Season	Team History	League	Division	Finish	W	L	T	References
1933	1933	NFL	Western	4th	3	6	1	
1934	1934	NFL	Western	6th	0	8	0	
All-time record					3	14	1	
