= 1946 Chicago Rockets season =

American football team season

- Head coach: Dick Hanley, Pat Boland, Bob Dove, Ned Mathews, and Willie Wilkin
- Home stadium: Soldier Field

Results
- Record: 5–6–3
- Division place: 4th AAFC West
- Playoffs: did not qualify

The 1946 Chicago Rockets season was the inaugural season for both the Chicago Rockets and the All-America Football Conference (AAFC) in which they played. The Rockets compiled a 5–6–3 record, were outscored by a total of 315 to 263, and finished in last place in the AAFC's West Division.

Dick Hanley, who had been the head coach at Northwestern from 1927 to 1934, was the head coach at the start of the season. After the first three games, the players voted 32-to-1 to remove Hanley. The team felt that Hanley's double-wing system was outdated. After a two-hour meeting between the players and team owner John L. Keeshin, Keeshin fired Hanley. Three of the players (Ned Mathews, Bob Dove, and Willie Wilkin) took over as player-coaches. The "self-coached experiment" ended on October 29 when Pat Boland was hired as head coach.

The team's statistical leaders included quarterback Bob Hoernschemeyer with 1,266 passing yards and 375 rushing yards, halfback Elroy Hirsch with 347 receiving yards, and backup quarterback (and placekicker) Steve Nemeth with 59 points scored (32 extra points, 9 field goals). Hoernschemeyer was the only Chicago player named to the All-AAFC team, receiving second-team honors from both the United Press and on the official All-AAFC team.

== Preseason schedule ==
Game	Date	Opponent	Result	Record	Venue	Attendance	Sources
1	August 18	vs. Brooklyn Dodgers	T 14–14	0–0–1	Multnomah Stadium		
2	September 1	at San Francisco 49ers	T 14–14	0–0–2	Kezar Stadium		

== Schedule ==
Game	Date	Opponent	Result	Record	Venue	Recap	Sources
1	September 13	**Cleveland Browns**	**L** 6–20	0–1	Soldier Field	Recap	
2	September 20	New York Yankees	**T** 17–17	0–1–1	Soldier Field	Recap	
3	September 25	Buffalo Bisons	**W** 38–35	1–1–1	Soldier Field	Recap	
4	September 29	**San Francisco 49ers**	**W** 24–7	2–1–1	Soldier Field	Recap	
5	October 5	**Los Angeles Dons**	**L** 9–21	2–2–1	Soldier Field	Recap	
6	October 11	at Brooklyn Dodgers	**T** 21–21	2–2–2	Ebbets Field	Recap	
7	October 18	Miami Seahawks	**W** 28–7	3–2–2	Soldier Field	Recap	
8	October 27	at Buffalo Bisons	**L** 17–49	3–3–2	Civic Stadium	Recap	
9	November 2	Brooklyn Dodgers	**L** 14–21	3–4–2	Soldier Field	Recap	
10	November 11	at Miami Seahawks	**W** 20–7	4–4–2	Burdine Stadium	Recap	
11	November 17	at **Cleveland Browns**	**L** 14–51	4–5–2	Municipal Stadium	Recap	
12	November 24	at New York Yankees	**W** 38–28	5–5–2	Yankee Stadium	Recap	
13	November 30	at **San Francisco 49ers**	**L** 0–14	5–6–2	Kezar Stadium	Recap	
—	Bye						
14	December 15	at **Los Angeles Dons**	**T** 17–17	5–6–3	LA Memorial Coliseum	Recap	
Note: Intra-division opponents are in **bold** text.

== Division standings ==
AAFC Western Division
	W	L	T	PCT	DIV	PF	PA	STK
Cleveland Browns	12	2	0	.857	4–2	423	137	W5
San Francisco 49ers	9	5	0	.643	4–2	307	189	W3
Los Angeles Dons	7	5	2	.583	2–3–1	305	290	T1
Chicago Rockets	5	6	3	.455	1–4–1	263	315	T1

Note: Tie games were not officially counted in the standings.

== Roster ==
1946 Chicago Rockets final roster
Backs: 88 Bill Boedeker CB/RB; 85 Walt Clay S/RB; 65 Norm Cox RB/S; 99 Don Griffin RB/CB; 66 Billy Hillenbrand RB/S; 80 Elroy Hirsch CB/RB; 64 Bob Hoernschemeyer RB/CB/P; 74 Bill Kellagher LB/FB; 71 Peter Lamana RB/CB; 73 Ernie Lewis FB/LB/P; 69 Steve Nemeth RB/K/S; 60 Bill Schroeder RB/CB; 82 Walt Williams RB/S/P; Ends/Receivers: 55 Bob Dove; 57 Ralph Heywood; 50 Pat Lahey; 53 Max Morris; 54 Bob Motl; 52 Frank Quillen	Linemen/Linebackers: 42 Jim Brutz T/DT; 25 Herb Coleman C/LB; 45 Charlie Huneke DT/T; 47 Quentin Klenk T/DT; 27 Mickey Parks LB/C; 49 Jim O'Neal G/MG; 30 Jim Pearcy G/MG; 33 Joe Ruetz DT/G; 34 Tony Sumpter MG/G; 40 Norm Verry T; 31 Evan Vogds G/LB; 48 Lloyd Wasserbach T/DT; 46 Willie Wilkin T/DT; Rookies in italics
