= List of NFL players who have posted a passer rating of zero =

The National Football League has seen a passer rating of zero posted 224 times: 220 times in the regular season and 4 times in the postseason.

To achieve a passer rating of zero in a game, a player must have no touchdowns, complete no more than 30% of his pass attempts, average less than three yards per attempt, and throw an interception on at least 9.5% of attempts. To qualify for this list, a player must have attempted at least ten passes (prior to 1976); 12 passes (1976–1977); or 14 passes (1978–present) in the game in question. Using these criteria, 151 different players have posted a zero rating; 28 players have done it more than once.

== Background ==
Eight players (Arnie Herber, Parker Hall, Hugh McCullough, Babe Parilli, Ralph Guglielmi, Lamar McHan, Al Dorow, and Rick Norton) posted a zero rating on a record three occasions throughout their career. Red Kirkman, Hugh McCullough, Lamar McHan, and Gary Keithley are the only players ever to post zero ratings in two straight weeks (in 1933, 1940, 1958, and 1973, respectively). The 1939 season saw a record ten games with a zero rating: Ray Carnelly (Brooklyn Dodgers), Parker Hall (Cleveland Rams), Arnie Herber (Green Bay Packers), Bert Johnson (Chicago Cardinals), Hugh McCullough (Pittsburgh Pirates), Coley McDonough (Pittsburgh Pirates), Frank Patrick (Chicago Cardinals, twice), and Darrell Tully (Detroit Lions, twice). The season with the second most (9) was 1948 (with both NFL and AAFC players included). 13 players have posted two zero passer ratings in the same season: Red Kirkman (1933), Johnny Gildea (1935), Frank Patrick (1939), Darnell Tully (1939), Hugh McCullough (1940), Al Dorow (1954), Lamar McHan (1958), Ralph Guglielmi (1959), Cotton Davidson (1962), Steve Tensi (1967), Rick Norton (1969), Gary Keithley (1973), and Randy Hedberg (1977).

All four postseason zero ratings happened in a Championship Game: George Ratterman of the Buffalo Bills in the 1948 AAFC Championship Game; Tommy Thompson of the Philadelphia Eagles in the 1948 NFL Championship Game; Otto Graham of the Cleveland Browns in the 1953 NFL Championship Game; and Craig Morton of the Denver Broncos in Super Bowl XII. Out of the four, Thompson is the only one whose team won.

There have been three occasions where a starting quarterback and his mid-game replacement have both earned a zero rating in the same game: starter Joe Namath and replacement Richard Todd with the New York Jets (1976), starter Vince Evans and replacement Bob Avellini with the Chicago Bears (1981), and starter Terry Bradshaw and replacement Cliff Stoudt with the Pittsburgh Steelers (1982). The most zero ratings on a single day in league history happened on November 19, 1939, when Ray Carnelly (Brooklyn Dodgers), Hugh McCullough (Pittsburgh Pirates), and Frank Patrick (Chicago Cardinals) all posted zero ratings.

The longest period between NFL games with a zero passer rating is 7 years, 10 months, and 30 days, spanning from Chris Redman of the Atlanta Falcons on December 16, 2007, to Peyton Manning of the Denver Broncos on November 15, 2015. Manning was 39 years and 236 days old in the 2015 game, the oldest age of any player to record a zero rating. In the 1939 season, Darrell Tully of the Detroit Lions posted a zero rating at the youngest age, 21 years and 319 days old. The most recent NFL zero passer rating game came on January 3, 2021, when Brandon Allen of the Cincinnati Bengals went 6-21 with 48 yards and two interceptions against the Baltimore Ravens. The Bengals lost 3–38.

On one occasion, players on opposing teams both posted a zero rating: Gary Keithley and the St. Louis Cardinals defeated Bob Lee and the Atlanta Falcons (1973). Of the 187 zero rating games, the team of a player who posted a zero rating has won 15 times (8.02%); 14 times in the regular season and once in the postseason (the aforementioned 1948 NFL Championship Game). The most recent example of a team winning a game with a zero rating quarterback is when Brent Pease did so with the in Houston Oilers in 1988. Four zero rating games have ended in a tie (2.14%); the most recent example of this is Len Dawson in 1970. Due to the NFL playoffs not allowing ties, all four such games have been in the regular season.

There have been 22 total zero passer rating games recorded by 14 Hall-of-Famers. The first was by Herber in 1933, and the most recent was by Peyton Manning in the 2015 season. 15 players who had a zero passer rating also earned a perfect (158.3) passer rating during their careers: Otto Graham, Johnny Unitas, Joe Namath, Terry Bradshaw, Len Dawson, Bob Griese, James Harris, Bob Lee, Scott Hunter, Dan Fouts, Craig Morton, Vince Evans, Rich Gannon, Eli Manning, and Peyton Manning.

The Arizona Cardinals franchise has had more zero rating games than any other franchise, with 18. The Chicago Bears have held opposing players to a zero passer rating more than any other franchise, having accomplished the feat 16 times.

== List ==
=== Key ===
#	The number (in chronological order) the entry represents in the list of zero passer rating games (example: a value of 48 in this column would indicate that it was the 48th zero passer rating game in NFL history)
Quarterback	The name of the quarterback who posted the zero passer rating
Date	The date on which the zero passer rating game occurred
Team	The team of the quarterback who posted the zero passer rating
Opponent	The opposing team of the quarterback
Result	The result (W, L, or T meaning win, loss, or tie, respectively) and score of the game from the quarterback's team's perspective
CMP	The amount of passes the quarterback completed
ATT	The amount of passes the quarterback attempted
CMP%	The percentage of passes the quarterback completed
YDS	The amount of passing yards the quarterback gained
INT	The amount of interceptions the quarterback threw
Notes	Any other relevant information about the specific zero passer rating game
†	Member of the Pro Football Hall of Fame

The following number of pass attempts are needed to qualify for this list:
* Prior to 1976: 10
* 1976-1977: 12
* 1978–present: 14

NFL quarterbacks with a zero passer rating
#	Quarterback	Date	Team	Opponent	Result	CMP	ATT	CMP%	YDS	INT	Notes
1	Rip King	October 23, 1921	Akron Pros	Canton Bulldogs	W 3–0	4	18	22.2%	38	2	
2	Jimmy Conzelman	November 13, 1921	Rock Island Independents	Chicago Staleys	L 0–3	2	10	20%	30	2	
3	Al Mahrt	October 8, 1921	Dayton Triangles	Canton Bulldogs	T 0–0	1	11	9.1%	25	3	
4	Rat Watson	November 5, 1922	Toledo Maroons	Canton Bulldogs	T 0-0	4	22	18.2%	58	8	Most interceptions in a single game in NFL history (tied with Jim Hardy)
5	Steve Sullivan	November 26, 1922	Hammond Pros	Racine Legion	L 0-6	1	12	8.3%	6	4	
6	Lou Smyth	November 30, 1922	Canton Bulldogs	Akron Pros	W 14-0	3	12	25%	32	5	
7	Jim Kendrick	December 10, 1922	Toledo Maroons	Canton Bulldogs	L 0-19	2	16	12.5%	45	2	
8	John Mohardt	November 4, 1923	Chicago Cardinals	Canton Bulldogs	L 3-7	3	12	25%	20	2	
9	Shorty Barr	November 11, 1923	Racine Legion	Green Bay Packers	L 0-16	6	23	26.1%	48	3	
10	Cecil Grigg	November 11, 1923	Canton Bulldogs	Buffalo All-Americans	T 3-3	2	17	11.8%	19	2	
11	Sonny Winters	December 9, 1923	Columbus Tigers	Canton Bulldogs	L 0-10	1	11	9.1%	10	3	
12	Bill Houle	October 26, 1924	Minneapolis Marines	Green Bay Packers	L 0-19	4	14	28.6%	41	2	
13	Wally Gilbert	November 9, 1924	Duluth Kelleys	Green Bay Packers	L 0-13	5	20	25%	56	4	
14	Curly Lambeau^{†} (Note: Inducted into the Hall of Fame as a coach/owner.)	November 23, 1924	Green Bay Packers	Chicago Bears	L 0-3	4	15	26.7%	38	6	
15	Frank Niehaus	November 8, 1925	Akron Pros	Pottsville Maroons	L 0-21	1	10	10%	5	1	
16	Tex Hamer	November 29, 1925	Frankford Yellow Jackets	Pottsville Maroons	L 0-49	4	15	26.7%	31	3	
17	Harry Curzon	September 26, 1925	Hammond Pros	Racine Tornadoes	L 3-6	1	12	8.3%	35	4	
18	Harry Newman	September 24, 1933	New York Giants	Portsmouth Spartans	L 7–17	2	11	18.2%	24	5	Highest interception percentage (45.5%) in a zero passer rating game
19	Arnie Herber^{†}	October 1, 1933	Green Bay Packers	New York Giants	L 7–10	1	12	8.3%	5	3	The first of a record three career games with a zero rating.
20	Swede Hanson	October 15, 1933	Philadelphia Eagles	New York Giants	L 0–56	4	14	28.6%	19	2	
21	Ed Westfall	October 15, 1933	Pittsburgh Pirates	Green Bay Packers	L 0–47	3	14	21.4%	40	4	
22	Joe Lillard	October 29, 1933	Chicago Cardinals	Brooklyn Dodgers	L 0–7	1	10	10%	24	2	
23	Red Kirkman	December 3, 1933	Philadelphia Eagles	Green Bay Packers	L 0–10	2	13	15.4%	17	3	
24	Red Kirkman (2)	December 10, 1933	Philadelphia Eagles	New York Giants	L 14–20	3	10	30%	7	1	Second consecutive game with a zero passer rating (one of only four players to do this)
25	Harry Newman (2)	September 23, 1934	New York Giants	Detroit Lions	L 0–9	2	18	11.1%	36	2	Second career game with a zero passer rating.
26	Warren Heller	September 26, 1934	Pittsburgh Pirates	Philadelphia Eagles	L 0–17	3	15	20%	45	3	
27	Alex Rado	November 18, 1934	Pittsburgh Pirates	Brooklyn Dodgers	L 0–10	2	11	18.2%	32	2	
28	Glenn Presnell	November 29, 1934	Detroit Lions	Chicago Bears	L 0–10	1	11	9.1%	15	2	
29	Red Franklin	September 29, 1935	Brooklyn Dodgers	Boston Redskins	L 3–7	2	11	18.2%	31	4	
30	Bill Shepherd	October 6, 1935	Boston Redskins	New York Giants	L 12–20	3	11	27.3%	20	2	
31	Johnny Gildea	November 24, 1935	Pittsburgh Pirates	Green Bay Packers	L 14–34	2	11	18.2%	31	3	The first of two career games with a zero rating for Gildea.
32	Johnny Gildea (2)	December 8, 1935	Pittsburgh Pirates	New York Giants	L 0–13	1	15	6.7%	35	3	The second of two career games with a zero rating for Gildea.
33	Phil Sarboe	December 8, 1935	Chicago Cardinals	Chicago Bears	L 0–13	3	10	30%	30	2	
34	Don Jackson	October 14, 1936	Philadelphia Eagles	Pittsburgh Pirates	L 0–17	1	10	10%	3	3	
35	Ed Matesic	November 29, 1936	Pittsburgh Pirates	Boston Redskins	L 0–30	2	13	15.4%	13	2	
36	Dave Smukler	October 17, 1937	Philadelphia Eagles	New York Giants	L 0–21	3	13	23.1%	8	2	
37	Carl Brumbaugh	October 31, 1937	Brooklyn Dodgers	Washington Redskins	L 0–21	1	10	10%	12	3	
38	Arnie Herber^{†}(2)	November 21, 1937	Green Bay Packers	New York Giants	L 0–10	3	14	21.4%	15	4	The second of a record three career games with a zero rating.
39	Emmett Mortell	October 2, 1938	Philadelphia Eagles	Chicago Bears	L 6–28	1	10	10%	1	2	
40	Pat Coffee	November 6, 1938	Chicago Cardinals	New York Giants	L 0–6	2	11	18.2%	8	2	
41	Bill Hartman	November 13, 1938	Washington Redskins	Chicago Bears	L 7–31	2	10	20%	9	2	
42	Ace Parker^{†}	November 24, 1938	Brooklyn Dodgers	New York Giants	T 7–7	1	10	10%	14	1	First of four games in NFL history with a zero rating player to end in a tie
43	Frank Patrick	October 15, 1939	Chicago Cardinals	Chicago Bears	L 7–44	2	16	12.5%	34	1	
44	Parker Hall	October 29, 1939	Cleveland Rams	Pittsburgh Pirates	T 14–14	1	13	7.7%	18	4	The first of three career games by Hall with a zero rating.; Second of four games in NFL history with a zero rating player to end in a tie; One of two games with a zero passer rating on October 29, 1939.
45	Darrell Tully	October 29, 1939	Detroit Lions	Chicago Bears	W 10–0	2	12	16.7%	17	2	First of two career games with a zero passer rating, both of which happened in 1939; Youngest player to post a zero passer rating game (21 years 319 days old); First time a team won the game in spite of having a zero rating quarterback; One of two games with a zero passer rating on October 29, 1939.
46	Bert Johnson	November 5, 1939	Chicago Cardinals	Cleveland Rams	L 0–14	3	10	30%	23	2	
47	Ray Carnelly	November 19, 1939	Brooklyn Dodgers	Green Bay Packers	L 0–28	3	13	23.1%	35	2	One of three quarterbacks who posted a zero rating on November 19, 1939, the most such games on a single day in NFL history.
48	Hugh McCullough	November 19, 1939	Pittsburgh Pirates	New York Giants	L 7–23	3	18	16.7%	29	5	The first of a record three career games with a zero rating.; One of three quarterbacks who posted a zero rating on November 19, 1939, the most such games on a single day in NFL history.
49	Frank Patrick (2)	November 19, 1939	Chicago Cardinals	Washington Redskins	L 7–28	1	11	9.1%	4	2	One of three quarterbacks who posted a zero rating on November 19, 1939, the most such games on a single day in NFL history.; The second of two career zero ratings for Patrick, both of which came in 1939.
50	Coley McDonough	November 23, 1939	Pittsburgh Pirates	Philadelphia Eagles	L 14–17	3	12	25%	31	3	
51	Arnie Herber^{†}(3)	November 26, 1939	Green Bay Packers	Cleveland Rams	W 7–6	3	13	23.1%	19	3	The third of a record three career games with a zero rating.; Second time a team won the game in spite of having a zero rating quarterback; One of two zero ratings on November 26, 1939
52	Darrell Tully (2)	November 26, 1939	Detroit Lions	Washington Redskins	L 7–31	3	16	18.8%	33	4	The second of a two career games with a zero rating, both of which happened in 1939.; One of two zero ratings on November 26, 1939
53	Hugh McCullough (2)	September 29, 1940	Chicago Cardinals	Green Bay Packers	L 6–31	2	12	16.7%	22	4	The second of a record three career zero rating games; The first of two consecutive weeks with a zero rating; only one other quarterback has accomplished this
54	Hugh McCullough (3)	October 5, 1940	Chicago Cardinals	Detroit Lions	L 14–43	3	11	27.3%	26	4	The third of a record three career zero rating games; The second of two consecutive weeks with a zero rating; only one other quarterback has accomplished this
55	Billy Patterson	October 6, 1940	Pittsburgh Steelers	Washington Redskins	L 10–40	2	11	18.2%	23	3	
56	Billy Jefferson	September 14, 1941	Detroit Lions	Green Bay Packers	L 0–23	3	17	17.6%	37	3	
57	Bill Leckonby	October 19, 1941	Brooklyn Dodgers	Chicago Cardinals	L 6–20	3	12	25%	33	2	
58	Boyd Brumbaugh	October 26, 1941	Pittsburgh Steelers	Chicago Bears	L 7–34	2	14	14.3%	28	3	
59	Parker Hall (2)	November 2, 1941	Cleveland Rams	Detroit Lions	L 0–14	3	10	30%	18	1	The second of three career games by Hall with a zero rating.
60	Dick Riffle	November 30, 1941	Pittsburgh Steelers	Brooklyn Dodgers	L 7–35	0	11	0%	0	4	One of two qualified zero rating games in which the passer had zero completions; one of four qualified zero rating games that the passer had zero yards.
61	Frank Filchock	December 7, 1941	Washington Redskins	Philadelphia Eagles	W 20–14	2	10	20%	18	3	Third time a team won the game in spite of having a zero rating quarterback.
62	Andy Tomasic	September 13, 1942	Pittsburgh Steelers	Philadelphia Eagles	L 14–24	2	10	20%	23	1	
63	Parker Hall (3)	September 27, 1942	Cleveland Rams	Detroit Lions	W 14–0	2	11	18.2%	26	2	The third of three career games by Hall with a zero rating.; Fourth time a team won the game in spite of having a zero rating quarterback.
64	Harry Hopp	October 18, 1942	Detroit Lions	Chicago Cardinals	L 0–7	3	10	30%	24	3	
65	Chet Wetterlund	November 8, 1942	Detroit Lions	Pittsburgh Steelers	L 7–35	0	10	0%	0	3	One of two qualified zero rating games in which the passer had zero completions; one of four qualified zero rating games in which the passer had zero yards.
66	Ronnie Cahill	November 7, 1943	Chicago Cardinals	Brooklyn Dodgers	L 0–7	4	15	26.7%	28	2	
67	Roy Zimmerman	November 14, 1943	Steagles (Note: In 1943, the Philadelphia Eagles and Pittsburgh Steelers combined their teams due to both teams losing a significant amount of players to military service during World War II. The team was officially known as the Phil-Pitt Combine.)	Brooklyn Dodgers	L 7–13	2	10	20%	6	2	The second consecutive week that the Dodgers held an opposing quarterback to a zero rating.
68	Pug Manders	November 5, 1944	Brooklyn Tigers	Philadelphia Eagles	L 7–21	1	16	6.3%	10	3	
69	Joe Sulaitis	November 12, 1944	New York Giants	Philadelphia Eagles	T 21–21	2	11	18.2%	21	2	Third of four games in NFL history with a zero rating player to end in a tie; Second consecutive week the Eagles held a player to a zero rating
70	Albie Reisz	November 26, 1944	Cleveland Rams	Detroit Lions	L 14–26	3	15	20%	44	3	
71	Paul Collins	September 23, 1945	Chicago Cardinals	Detroit Lions	L 0–10	2	13	15.4%	35	2	
72	Cotton Price	October 7, 1945	Detroit Lions	Green Bay Packers	L 21–57	2	14	14.3%	29	3	
73	Roy Zimmerman (2)	November 9, 1947	Detroit Lions	Chicago Cardinals	L 7–17	2	13	15.4%	0	2	One of four zero rating games in which the passer had zero yards
74	Bob Waterfield^{†}	November 16, 1947	Los Angeles Rams	Chicago Bears	L 21–41	4	16	25%	30	2	
75	Gonzalo Morales	November 30, 1947	Pittsburgh Steelers	Philadelphia Eagles	L 0–21	4	14	28.6%	24	2	
76	Angelo Bertelli	August 27, 1948	Chicago Rockets	Los Angeles Dons	L 0–7	3	18	16.7%	20	2	
77	Sam Vacanti	October 1, 1948	Chicago Rockets	San Francisco 49ers	L 14–31	3	10	30%	22	1	
78	Johnny Clement	October 17, 1948	Pittsburgh Steelers	Boston Yanks	L 7–13	2	12	16.7%	29	3	One of two zero passer rating games on October 17, 1948.
79	Fred Enke	October 17, 1948	Detroit Lions	Chicago Bears	L 0–28	5	18	27.8%	50	3	One of two zero passer rating games on October 17, 1948.
80	Jesse Freitas	October 24, 1948	Chicago Rockets	Brooklyn Dodgers	L 14–35	3	10	30%	28	1	
81	Bobby Layne^{†}	November 28, 1948	Chicago Bears	Washington Redskins	W 48–13	1	10	10%	0	1	Fifth time a team won the game in spite of having a zero rating quarterback.; One of four qualified zero rating games that the passer had zero yards.
82	Bill Mackrides	December 5, 1948	Philadelphia Eagles	Boston Yanks	L 14–37	2	10	20%	21	1	
83	George Ratterman	December 19, 1948	Buffalo Bills	Cleveland Browns	L 7–49	5	18	27.8%	24	3	AAFC Championship Game; One of four postseason zero rating games in NFL history; One of two zero passer rating games on December 19, 1948 (the other being the NFL Championship Game)
84	Tommy Thompson	December 19, 1948	Philadelphia Eagles	Chicago Cardinals	W 7–0	2	12	16.7%	7	2	NFL Championship Game; One of four postseason zero rating games in NFL history; Sixth time a team won the game in spite of having a zero rating quarterback; this is the only such occurrence in the postseason; One of two zero passer ratings on December 19, 1948 (the other being the AAFC Championship Game)
85	Don Panciera	September 22, 1949	New York Yankees	Los Angeles Dons	W 10–7	2	10	20%	30	2	Seventh time a team won the game in spite of having a zero rating quarterback
86	Jim Hardy	October 8, 1949	Chicago Cardinals	Philadelphia Eagles	L 3–28	3	16	18.8%	11	3	
87	Glenn Dobbs	October 14, 1949	Los Angeles Dons	Cleveland Browns	L 14–61	5	17	29.4%	29	2	
88	Stan Heath	November 27, 1949	Green Bay Packers	Chicago Cardinals	L 21–41	2	10	20%	14	1	
89	Tom O'Malley	September 17, 1950	Green Bay Packers	Detroit Lions	L 7–45	4	15	26.7%	31	6	Most interceptions thrown by a player in a zero pass rating game
90	Adrian Burk	October 14, 1951	Philadelphia Eagles	Green Bay Packers	L 24–37	3	13	23.1%	30	2	
91	Bob Waterfield^{†} (2)	September 28, 1952	Los Angeles Rams	Cleveland Browns	L 7–37	3	10	30%	26	1	Replaced by Norm Van Brocklin, who also posted a passer rating of zero.
92	Norm Van Brocklin	September 28, 1952	Los Angeles Rams	Cleveland Browns	L 7–37	3	17	17.6%	40	2	Did not start; he replaced Bob Waterfield, who had also posted a passer rating of zero.; First of two career zero rating games
93	Eddie LeBaron	November 9, 1952	Washington Redskins	Philadelphia Eagles	L 20–38	3	10	30%	16	1	First of two career zero rating games
94	George Taliaferro	November 22, 1953	Baltimore Colts	Philadelphia Eagles	L 13–21	6	21	28.6%	53	2	9.5% interception percentage is the lowest possible in a zero passer rating game; Taliaferro is one of three players in a zero passer rating game to have exactly a 9.5% interception percentage, along with Earl Morrall in 1965 and Brandon Allen in 2021.; The first of two career zero rating games for Taliaferro
95	Babe Parilli	December 12, 1953	Green Bay Packers	Philadelphia Eagles	L 17–33	2	13	15.4%	9	2	The first of a record three career games with a zero rating.
96	Otto Graham	December 27, 1953	Cleveland Browns	Detroit Lions	L 16–17	2	15	13.3%	20	2	NFL Championship Game; One of four postseason zero rating games in NFL history
97	Al Dorow	October 10, 1954	Washington Redskins	New York Giants	L 21–51	2	10	20%	20	1	The first of a record three career games with a zero rating
98	Al Dorow (2)	November 7, 1954	Washington Redskins	Cleveland Browns	L 3–62	3	14	21.4%	33	3	The second of a joint-record three career games with a zero rating; Dorow's second zero rating game of the 1954 season
99	Paul Held	December 5, 1954	Pittsburgh Steelers	New York Giants	L 3–24	1	10	10%	10	3	
100	Lamar McHan	September 26, 1955	Chicago Cardinals	Pittsburgh Steelers	L 7–14	5	17	29.4%	37	2	The first of a record three career games with a zero rating.
101	Ralph Guglielmi	October 16, 1955	Washington Redskins	Cleveland Browns	L 14–24	2	10	20%	17	2	The first of a record three career games with a zero rating.
102	Norm Van Brocklin^{†} (2)	October 16, 1955	Los Angeles Rams	Green Bay Packers	L 28–30	3	14	21.4%	34	3	Second of two career zero rating games
103	Tobin Rote	October 23, 1955	Green Bay Packers	Cleveland Browns	L 10–41	6	20	30%	42	2	The first of two career zero rating games for Rote; The second consecutive week that the Browns held an opposing quarterback to a zero rating
104	Babe Parilli (2)	October 6, 1957	Green Bay Packers	Detroit Lions	L 14–24	2	10	20%	19	3	The second of a record three career games with a zero rating.
105	Tobin Rote (2)	November 24, 1957	Detroit Lions	Chicago Bears	L 7–27	2	10	20%	12	1	The second of two career zero rating games for Rote
106	Babe Parilli (3)	November 2, 1958	Green Bay Packers	Baltimore Colts	L 0–56	1	11	9.1%	6	3	Parilli's third of a joint-record three career games with a zero rating; One of two zero rating games on November 2, 1958
107	Milt Plum	November 2, 1958	Cleveland Browns	New York Giants	L 17–21	4	14	28.6%	26	2	One of two zero rating games on November 2, 1958
108	Lamar McHan (2)	December 7, 1958	Chicago Cardinals	Chicago Bears	L 14–30	1	10	10%	1	2	The second of a record three career games with a zero rating; First of two consecutive games with a zero passer rating (one of only four players to do this)
109	Lamar McHan (3)	December 13, 1958	Chicago Cardinals	Pittsburgh Steelers	L 21–38	2	10	20%	17	3	The third of a record three career games with a zero rating; Second consecutive game with a zero passer rating (one of only four players to do this)
110	Ralph Guglielmi (2)	October 18, 1959	Washington Redskins	Pittsburgh Steelers	L 6–27	2	13	15.4%	9	2	The second of a joint-record three career games with a zero rating.
111	Ralph Guglielmi (3)	November 22, 1959	Washington Redskins	Green Bay Packers	L 0–21	4	14	28.6%	30	2	The third of a joint-record three career games with a zero rating.
112	King Hill	October 2, 1960	St. Louis Cardinals	New York Giants	L 35–14	3	13	23.1%	25	2	
113	Eddie LeBaron (2)	October 2, 1960	Dallas Cowboys	Baltimore Colts	L 7–45	3	10	30%	21	3	Second of two career zero rating games
114	Bobby Layne^{†} (2)	November 6, 1960	Pittsburgh Steelers	Philadelphia Eagles	L 7–34	2	16	12.5%	23	2	Second of two career zero rating games
115	Richie Lucas	September 23, 1961	Buffalo Bills	Boston Patriots	L 21–23	2	10	20%	19	1	
116	George Izo	October 15, 1961	Washington Redskins	Pittsburgh Steelers	L 0–20	4	14	28.6%	42	2	
117	John Brodie	October 22, 1961	San Francisco 49ers	Chicago Bears	L 0–31	3	10	30%	23	2	
118	Al Dorow (3)	September 9, 1962	Buffalo Bills	Houston Oilers	L 23–28	4	17	23.5%	44	3	The third of a joint-record three career games with a zero rating
119	John Hadl	October 13, 1962	San Diego Chargers	Buffalo Bills	L 10–35	2	12	16.7%	17	2	The first of two career games with a zero passer rating for Hadl
120	Cotton Davidson	October 14, 1962	Oakland Raiders	Denver Broncos	L 6–23	2	10	20%	22	1	The first of two zero ratings for Davidson in the 1962 season
121	Cotton Davidson (2)	November 18, 1962	Oakland Raiders	Buffalo Bills	L 10–6	5	20	25%	25	2	The second of two zero ratings for Davidson in the 1962 season
122	Daryle Lamonica	September 28, 1963	Buffalo Bills	Houston Oilers	L 20–31	5	17	29.4%	49	2	
123	John McCormick	November 28, 1963	Denver Broncos	Oakland Raiders	L 10–26	2	10	20%	7	2	
124	Bill Munson	October 11, 1964	Los Angeles Rams	Chicago Bears	L 17–38	4	15	26.7%	42	4	
125	Earl Morrall	September 19, 1965	New York Giants	Dallas Cowboys	L 2–31	6	21	28.6%	63	2	9.5% interception percentage is the lowest possible in a zero passer rating game; Morrall is one of three players in a zero passer rating game to have exactly a 9.5% interception percentage, along with George Taliaferro in 1953 and Brandon Allen in 2021.
126	Dick Wood	September 19, 1965	Oakland Raiders	San Diego Chargers	L 6–17	4	14	28.6%	31	2	
127	Jack Kemp	December 5, 1965	Buffalo Bills	Houston Oilers	W 29–18	2	10	20%	25	1	Seventh time a team won the game in spite of having a zero rating quarterback
128	Dick Wood (2)	September 9, 1966	Miami Dolphins	New York Jets	L 14–19	2	15	13.3%	25	2	Second career 0.0 game; The first of three Dolphins players with a zero rating game in 1966
129	Rick Norton	September 18, 1966	Miami Dolphins	Buffalo Bills	L 24–58	3	10	30%	17	3	The first of a record three career games with a zero rating; The second of three Dolphins players with a zero rating game in 1966
130	George Wilson	November 6, 1966	Miami Dolphins	Buffalo Bills	L 0–29	3	13	23.1%	28	3	The third of three Dolphins players with a zero rating game in 1966
131	Steve Tensi	September 17, 1967	Denver Broncos	Miami Dolphins	L 21–35	6	20	30%	55	2	The first of two career zero rating games, both in the 1967 season within the span of less than one month
132	Ron Vander Kelen	September 22, 1967	Minnesota Vikings	Los Angeles Rams	L 3–39	3	13	23.1%	23	2	
133	Steve Tensi (2)	September 17, 1967	Denver Broncos	Houston Oilers	L 6–10	6	22	27.3%	58	3	The second of two career zero rating games, both in the 1967 season within the span of less than one month
134	Joe Kapp	October 15, 1967	Minnesota Vikings	Green Bay Packers	W 10–7	2	11	18.2%	25	2	Eighth time a team won the game in spite of having a zero rating quarterback
135	Don Trull	December 9, 1967	Boston Patriots	Buffalo Bills	L 16–44	5	20	25%	57	3	
136	Jack Concannon	September 22, 1968	Chicago Bears	Detroit Lions	L 0–42	4	14	28.6%	40	3	
137	Bob Griese^{†}	September 28, 1968	Miami Dolphins	Kansas City Chiefs	L 3–48	2	17	11.8%	24	2	
138	Johnny Unitas^{†}	October 20, 1968	Baltimore Colts	Cleveland Browns	L 20–30	1	11	9.1%	12	3	
139	Virgil Carter	October 12, 1969	Chicago Bears	Minnesota Vikings	L 0–31	3	12	25%	25	2	
140	Rick Norton (2)	November 23, 1969	Miami Dolphins	Houston Oilers	L 7–32	7	26	26.9%	43	5	The second of a record three career games with a zero rating; The first of two games in 1969 in which Norton posted a zero rating
141	Rick Norton (3)	December 14, 1969	Miami Dolphins	New York Jets	L 9–27	3	15	20%	39	2	The third of a record three career games with a zero rating; The second of two games in 1969 in which Norton posted a zero rating, both within less than a month
142	Billy Kilmer	September 27, 1970	New Orleans Saints	Minnesota Vikings	L 0–26	6	20	30%	16	2	
143	Don Gault	October 3, 1970	Cleveland Browns	Pittsburgh Steelers	W 15–7	1	16	6.3%	44	2	Only career NFL start; Second and last career game played; Ninth time a team won the game in spite of having a zero rating quarterback
144	Mike Taliaferro	October 11, 1970	Boston Patriots	Kansas City Chiefs	L 10–23	3	12	25%	30	4	
145	Rick Arrington	October 25, 1970	Philadelphia Eagles	Green Bay Packers	L 17–30	3	10	30%	16	3	
146	Terry Hanratty	November 15, 1970	Pittsburgh Steelers	Kansas City Chiefs	L 14–31	3	12	25%	35	2	
147	Len Dawson^{†}	November 22, 1970	Kansas City Chiefs	St. Louis Cardinals	T 6–6	4	14	28.6%	38	2	The fourth (and most recent) of four games in NFL history with a zero rating player to end in a tie
148	Terry Bradshaw^{†}	December 13, 1970	Pittsburgh Steelers	Atlanta Falcons	L 16–27	3	12	25%	30	2	One of two career zero rating games for Bradshaw
149	Kent Nix	October 3, 1971	Chicago Bears	Los Angeles Rams	L 3–17	5	23	21.7%	60	3	
150	Bobby Douglass	November 21, 1971	Chicago Bears	Detroit Lions	L 3–28	6	26	23.1%	68	4	
151	John Hadl (2)	November 28, 1971	San Diego Chargers	Cincinnati Bengals	L 0–31	5	18	27.8%	49	4	The second of two career games with a zero passer rating for Hadl
152	Gary Cuozzo	December 11, 1971	Minnesota Vikings	Detroit Lions	W 29–10	4	15	26.7%	21	2	10th time a team won the game in spite of having a zero rating quarterback
153	Greg Landry	September 24, 1972	Detroit Lions	Minnesota Vikings	L 10–34	3	15	20%	39	3	
154	Dan Pastorini	October 9, 1972	Houston Oilers	Oakland Raiders	L 0–34	3	21	14.3%	31	4	The first of two career 0.0 games by Pastorini
155	Pat Sullivan	October 29, 1972	Atlanta Falcons	San Francisco 49ers	L 14–49	1	11	9.1%	12	2	
156	Al Woodall	October 7, 1973	New York Jets	Miami Dolphins	L 3–31	4	15	26.7%	45	2	
157	Scott Hunter	October 28, 1973	Green Bay Packers	Detroit Lions	L 0–34	1	10	10%	−4	1	The only qualified zero passer rating game in which the passer had less than 0 passing yards.
158	Randy Johnson	November 4, 1973	New York Giants	Oakland Raiders	L 0–42	2	12	16.7%	15	2	
159	Bob Lee	December 9, 1973	Atlanta Falcons	St. Louis Cardinals	L 10–32	3	16	18.8%	27	2	Had perfect 158.3 game earlier in season; Both starting QBs (Lee and Gary Keithley of the St.Louis Cardinals had a zero passer rating in the game; this is the only time this has ever occurred
160	Gary Keithley	December 9, 1973	St. Louis Cardinals	Atlanta Falcons	W 32–10	2	10	20%	9	1	First career start; The first of two career zero passer rating games by Keithley; the second of which happened the following week; Keithley is one of only four players to post zero passer rating games in consecutive games; Both starting QBs (Keithley and Bob Lee of the Atlanta Falcons) had a zero passer rating in the game; this is the only time this has ever occurred
161	Gary Keithley (2)	December 16, 1973	St. Louis Cardinals	Dallas Cowboys	L 3–30	6	20	30%	30	2	Second career start; Second consecutive game with a zero passer rating (one of only four players to do this)
162	Joe Namath^{†}	September 29, 1974	New York Jets	Buffalo Bills	L 12–16	2	18	11.1%	33	3	The first of two career zero passer rating games by Namath
163	Archie Manning	November 25, 1974	New Orleans Saints	Pittsburgh Steelers	L 7–28	2	10	20%	9	3	Part of the only two father–son combinations on this list (sons Eli and Peyton Manning)
164	James Harris	September 21, 1975	Los Angeles Rams	Dallas Cowboys	L 7–18	1	10	10%	5	3	
165	Dan Fouts^{†}	October 5, 1975	San Diego Chargers	Oakland Raiders	L 0–6	3	13	23.1%	29	2	
166	Kim McQuilken	November 9, 1975	Atlanta Falcons	Minnesota Vikings	L 0–38	5	26	19.2%	43	5	
167	Terry Bradshaw^{†} (2)	December 20, 1975	Pittsburgh Steelers	Los Angeles Rams	L 3–10	3	10	30%	28	1	Second career 0.0 game for Bradshaw; The first time a quarterback was replaced mid-game by a player who also finished with a 0.0 rating (Joe Gilliam).
168	Joe Gilliam	December 20, 1975	Pittsburgh Steelers	Los Angeles Rams	L 3–10	2	11	18.2%	29	2	Replaced Terry Bradshaw; The first time a quarterback with a 0.0 rating (Bradshaw) was replaced mid-game by a player (Gilliam) who also finished with a 0.0 rating.
169	Lynn Dickey	September 26, 1976	Green Bay Packers	Cincinnati Bengals	L 7–28	5	20	25%	45	2	
170	Norm Snead	November 14, 1976	New York Giants	Washington Redskins	W 12–9	3	14	21.4%	26	2	Final career start; 12th time a team won the game in spite of having a zero rating quarterback
171	Gary Marangi	November 21, 1976	Buffalo Bills	San Diego Chargers	L 13–34	8	30	26.7%	83	3	Most attempts, yards and completions by a player posting a 0.0 rating.
172	Joe Namath^{†} (2)	December 12, 1976	New York Jets	Cincinnati Bengals	L 3–42	4	15	26.7%	20	4	Second career 0.0 game; Second time that a starter and replacement (Richard Todd) both had a 0.0 rating in same game
173	Richard Todd	December 12, 1976	New York Jets	Cincinnati Bengals	L 3–42	3	13	23.1%	23	2	Second time that a starter (Joe Namath) and replacement both had a 0.0 passer rating in the same game.
174	Jim Plunkett	September 19, 1977	San Francisco 49ers	Pittsburgh Steelers	L 0–27	3	13	23.1%	30	2	
175	Randy Hedberg	October 23, 1977	Tampa Bay Buccaneers	Green Bay Packers	L 0–13	3	13	23.1%	18	2	First of two career zero rating games, both of which were in 1977; Did not start
176	Randy Hedberg (2)	December 4, 1977	Tampa Bay Buccaneers	Chicago Bears	L 0–10	4	15	26.7%	36	2	Second of two career zero rating games, both of which were in 1977; Last career game played in NFL; Only post-merger QB to post a 0.0 season rating with 90+ attempts.
177	Craig Morton	January 15, 1978	Denver Broncos	Dallas Cowboys	L 27–10	4	15	26.7%	39	4	Super Bowl XII; One of four (and the most recent) postseason zero rating games in NFL history; Removed from the game in the third quarter.
178	Dan Pastorini (2)	September 9, 1979	Houston Oilers	Pittsburgh Steelers	L 7–38	4	16	25%	16	3	The first of two career 0.0 games by Pastorini
179	Vince Evans	November 22, 1981	Chicago Bears	Detroit Lions	L 7–23	4	19	21.1%	21	2	Second time that a starter and replacement (Avellini) both had a 0.0 passer rating in the same game.
180	Warren Moon^{†}	November 10, 1985	Houston Oilers	Buffalo Bills	L 0–20	3	14	21.4%	22	3	The first of two career 0.0 ratings for Moon
181	Gary Hogeboom	November 17, 1985	Dallas Cowboys	Chicago Bears	L 0–44	6	22	27.3%	60	3	Did not start.
182	David Archer	November 24, 1985	Atlanta Falcons	Chicago Bears	L 0–36	2	15	13.3%	10	2	
183	Marc Wilson	November 9, 1986	Los Angeles Raiders	Dallas Cowboys	W 17–13	4	14	28.6%	37	3	13th time a team won the game in spite of having a zero rating quarterback
184	Warren Moon (2)^{†}	November 30, 1986	Houston Oilers	Cleveland Browns	L 10–13 (OT)	5	23	21.7%	68	4	Second career 0.0 game for Moon; Only game with a 0.0 rating player to go to overtime
185	Bubby Brister	October 2, 1988	Pittsburgh Steelers	Cleveland Browns	L 9–23	4	14	28.6%	28	2	
186	Brent Pease	October 9, 1988	Houston Oilers	Kansas City Chiefs	W 7–6	3	14	21.4%	26	3	14th (and most recent) time a team won the game in spite of having a zero rating quarterback
187	Pat Ryan	September 30, 1991	Philadelphia Eagles	Washington Redskins	L 0–23	4	14	28.6%	24	3	Did not start.
188	Tommy Maddox	October 15, 1995	New York Giants	Philadelphia Eagles	L 14–17	6	23	26.1%	49	3	0.0 passer rating for the season.
189	Kent Graham	October 12, 1997	Arizona Cardinals	New York Giants	L 13–27	4	14	28.6%	40	2	
190	Tony Graziani	October 26, 1997	Atlanta Falcons	Carolina Panthers	L 12–21	4	18	22.2%	24	2	First career start.
191	Trent Dilfer	December 14, 1997	Tampa Bay Buccaneers	New York Jets	L 0–31	2	15	13.3%	38	2	
192	Ryan Leaf	September 20, 1998	San Diego Chargers	Kansas City Chiefs	L 7–23	1	15	6.7%	4	2	
193	Scott Mitchell	October 15, 2000	Cincinnati Bengals	Pittsburgh Steelers	L 0–15	4	16	25%	39	2	
194	Anthony Wright	December 25, 2000	Dallas Cowboys	Tennessee Titans	L 0–31	5	20	25%	35	2	
195	Randy Fasani	October 27, 2002	Carolina Panthers	Tampa Bay Buccaneers	L 9–12	5	18	27.8%	46	3	Only career NFL start.
196	Tim Hasselbeck	December 14, 2003	Washington Redskins	Dallas Cowboys	L 0–27	6	26	23.1%	56	4	
197	Jeff Garcia	September 19, 2004	Cleveland Browns	Dallas Cowboys	L 12–19	8	27	29.6%	71	3	
198	Eli Manning	December 12, 2004	New York Giants	Baltimore Ravens	L 14–37	4	18	22.2%	27	2	Removed from the game in the fourth quarter. Father Archie Manning, and brother Peyton Manning also had 0.0 passer ratings in games.
199	Joey Harrington	December 17, 2006	Miami Dolphins	Buffalo Bills	L 0–21	5	17	29.4%	20	2	
200	Chris Redman	December 16, 2007	Atlanta Falcons	Tampa Bay Buccaneers	L 3–37	4	15	26.7%	34	2	The 7 years, 10 months, and 30 days between Redman's 0.0 passer rating game and the next such NFL game (Peyton Manning on November 15, 2015) is the longest interval between 0.0 passer rating games in NFL history.
201	Peyton Manning^{†}	November 15, 2015	Denver Broncos	Kansas City Chiefs	L 13–29	5	20	25%	35	4	Removed from the game in the third quarter; Broke the career passing yards record during the game (it has since been broken by Tom Brady and Drew Brees).; Oldest player to have a zero passer rating game (39 years, 236 days old); His father (Archie Manning) and brother (Eli Manning) also had 0.0 passer rating games; The 7 years, 10 months, and 30 days between Manning's 0.0 passer rating game and the last such NFL game (Chris Redman on December 16, 2007) is the longest interval between 0.0 passer rating games in NFL history.
202	Nathan Peterman	September 9, 2018	Buffalo Bills	Baltimore Ravens	L 3–47	5	18	27.8%	24	2	Removed from the game in the third quarter. Replacement (Josh Allen) would have a perfect 158.3 game in 2023.
203	Brandon Allen	January 3, 2021	Cincinnati Bengals	Baltimore Ravens	L 3–38	6	21	28.6%	48	2	9.5% interception percentage is the lowest possible in a zero passer rating game; Allen is one of three players in a zero passer rating game to have exactly a 9.5% interception percentage, along with George Taliaferro in 1953 and Earl Morrall in 1965.

=== Most zero passer rating games ===
Count	Player	Seasons	Team(s)
3	Al Dorow	1954 (2), 1962	Washington Redskins
3	Parker Hall	1939, 1941, 1942	Cleveland Rams
3	Ralph Guglielmi	1955, 1959 (2)	Washington Redskins
3	Arnie Herber	1933, 1937, 1939	Green Bay Packers (3)
3	Hugh McCullough	1939, 1940 (2)	Chicago Cardinals (2) / Pittsburgh Pirates
3	Lamar McHan	1955, 1958 (2)	Chicago Cardinals
3	Rick Norton	1966, 1969 (2)	Miami Dolphins
3	Babe Parilli	1953, 1957, 1958	Green Bay Packers
2	Terry Bradshaw	1970, 1975	Pittsburgh Steelers
2	Cotton Davidson	1962 (2)	Oakland Raiders
2	Johnny Gildea	1935 (2)	Pittsburgh Pirates
2	John Hadl	1962, 1971	San Diego Chargers
2	Randy Hedberg	1977 (2)	Tampa Bay Buccaneers
2	Gary Keithley	1973 (2)	St. Louis Cardinals
2	Red Kirkman	1933 (2)	Philadelphia Eagles
2	Bobby Layne	1948, 1960	Chicago Bears (1) / Pittsburgh Steelers (1)
2	Eddie LeBaron	1952, 1960	Washington Redskins (1) / Dallas Cowboys (1)
2	Warren Moon	1985, 1986	Houston Oilers
2	Joe Namath	1974, 1976	New York Jets
2	Harry Newman	1933, 1934	New York Giants
2	Dan Pastorini	1972, 1979	Houston Oilers
2	Frank Patrick	1939 (2)	Chicago Cardinals
2	Tobin Rote	1955, 1957	Green Bay Packers (1) / Detroit Lions (1)
2	Steve Tensi	1967 (2)	Denver Broncos
2	Darrell Tully	1939 (2)	Detroit Lions
2	Norm Van Brocklin	1952, 1955	Los Angeles Rams
2	Bob Waterfield	1947, 1952	Los Angeles Rams
2	Dick Wood	1965, 1966	Oakland Raiders (1) / Miami Dolphins (1)
2	Roy Zimmerman	1943, 1947	Steagles (Note: In 1943, the Philadelphia Eagles and Pittsburgh Steelers combined their teams due to both teams losing a significant amount of players to military service during World War II. The team was officially known as the Phil-Pitt Combine.) (1) / Detroit Lions (1)

=== Most recent zero passer rating game for each active franchise ===
Player is active.

Franchise (Note: This table lists each active NFL franchise by its current name.)	Date of game	Player	Time since game
Arizona Cardinals	October 12, 1997	Kent Graham	29 years, 17 days
Atlanta Falcons	December 16, 2007	Chris Redman	18 years, 317 days
Baltimore Ravens	--	--	--
Buffalo Bills	September 9, 2018	Nathan Peterman	8 years, 50 days
Carolina Panthers	October 27, 2002	Randy Fasani	24 years, 2 days
Chicago Bears	November 22, 1981	Vince Evans (Note: Also the most recent player to have a perfect passer rating in a game for the Bears, which he did on December 7, 1980.)	44 years, 341 days
Cincinnati Bengals	January 3, 2021	Brandon Allen	5 years, 299 days
Cleveland Browns	September 19, 2004	Jeff Garcia	22 years, 40 days
Dallas Cowboys	December 25, 2000	Anthony Wright	25 years, 308 days
Denver Broncos	November 15, 2015	Peyton Manning	10 years, 348 days
Detroit Lions	September 24, 1972	Greg Landry	54 years, 35 days
Green Bay Packers	September 26, 1976	Lynn Dickey	50 years, 33 days
Houston Texans	--	--	--
Indianapolis Colts	October 20, 1968	Johnny Unitas	58 years, 9 days
Jacksonville Jaguars	--	--	--
Kansas City Chiefs	November 22, 1970	Len Dawson	55 years, 341 days
Las Vegas Raiders	November 9, 1986	Marc Wilson	39 years, 354 days
Los Angeles Chargers	September 20, 1998	Ryan Leaf	28 years, 39 days
Los Angeles Rams	September 21, 1975	Shack Harris	51 years, 38 days
Miami Dolphins	December 17, 2006	Joey Harrington	19 years, 316 days
Minnesota Vikings	December 11, 1971	Gary Cuozzo	54 years, 322 days
New England Patriots	October 11, 1970	Mike Taliaferro	56 years, 18 days
New Orleans Saints	November 25, 1974	Archie Manning	51 years, 338 days
New York Giants	December 12, 2004	Eli Manning	21 years, 321 days
New York Jets	December 12, 1976 (Note: Both quarterbacks posted zero passer ratings in the same game; Namath started and was replaced by Todd.)	Joe Namath	49 years, 321 days
New York Jets	December 12, 1976	Richard Todd	49 years, 321 days
Philadelphia Eagles	September 30, 1991	Pat Ryan	35 years, 29 days
Pittsburgh Steelers	October 2, 1988	Bubby Brister	38 years, 27 days
San Francisco 49ers	September 19, 1977	Jim Plunkett	49 years, 40 days
Seattle Seahawks	--	--	--
Tampa Bay Buccaneers	December 14, 1997	Trent Dilfer	28 years, 319 days
Tennessee Titans	October 9, 1988	Brent Pease	38 years, 20 days
Washington Commanders	December 14, 2003	Tim Hasselbeck	22 years, 319 days

=== Most recent zero passer rating game at each active stadium ===
Quarterback who had the zero passer rating game was on the home team.
Player is active.

Stadium	Year opened	Date of game	Player	Franchise (Note: This table lists each active NFL franchise by its current name.)	Time since game
Arrowhead Stadium	1972	September 20, 1998	Ryan Leaf	Los Angeles Chargers	28 years, 39 days
AT&T Stadium	2009	--	--	--	--
Acrisure Stadium	2001	--	--	--	--
Allegiant Stadium	2020	--	--	--	--
Bank of America Stadium	1996	October 27, 2002	Randy Fasani	Carolina Panthers	24 years, 2 days
Caesars Superdome	1975	January 15, 1978 (Note: Super Bowl XII.)	Craig Morton	Denver Broncos	48 years, 287 days
Empower Field at Mile High	2001	November 15, 2015	Peyton Manning	Denver Broncos	10 years, 348 days
Everbank Stadium	1995	--	--	--	--
Ford Field	2002	--	--	--	--
Gillette Stadium	2002	--	--	--	--
Hard Rock Stadium	1987	--	--	--	--
Highmark Stadium	2026	--	--	--	--
Huntington Bank Field	1999	--	--	--	--
Lambeau Field	1957	November 22, 1959	Ralph Guglielmi	Washington Commanders	66 years, 341 days
Levi's Stadium	2014	--	--	--	--
Lincoln Financial Field	2003	--	--	--	--
Lucas Oil Stadium	2008	--	--	--	--
Lumen Field	2002	--	--	--	--
M&T Bank Stadium	1998	September 9, 2018	Nathan Peterman	Buffalo Bills	8 years, 50 days
Mercedes-Benz Stadium	2017	--	--	--	--
MetLife Stadium (Note: Home stadium of both the New York Giants and New York Jets.)	2010	--	--	--	--
Nissan Stadium	1999	December 25, 2000	Anthony Wright	Dallas Cowboys	25 years, 308 days
Northwest Stadium	1997	December 14, 2003	Tim Hasselbeck	Washington Commanders	22 years, 319 days
Paycor Stadium	2000	January 3, 2021	Brandon Allen	Cincinnati Bengals	5 years, 299 days
Raymond James Stadium	1998	December 16, 2007	Chris Redman	Atlanta Falcons	18 years, 317 days
Reliant Stadium	2002	--	--	--	--
SoFi Stadium (Note: Home stadium of both the Los Angeles Chargers and Los Angeles Rams.)	2020	--	--	--	--
Soldier Field	1924	November 24, 1985	David Archer	Atlanta Falcons	40 years, 339 days
State Farm Stadium	2006	--	--	--	--
U.S. Bank Stadium	2016	--	--	--	--

== See also ==
- List of NFL quarterbacks who have posted a perfect passer rating
