= 1948 Chicago Rockets season =

American football team season

- Head coach: Edward McKeever
- Home stadium: Soldier Field

Results
- Record: 1–13
- Division place: 4th AAFC West
- Playoffs: did not qualify

The 1948 Chicago Rockets season was their third in the All-America Football Conference. The team matched their previous output of 1–13, failing to qualify for the playoffs for the third consecutive season.

The Rockets had a turnover margin of minus-30, which is tied for the worst in professional football history.

The team's statistical leaders included Jesse Freitas with 1,425 passing yards, Eddie Prokop with 266 rushing yards, and Fay King with 647 receiving yards and 42 points scored.

== Preseason ==
Week	Date	Opponent	Result	Record	Venue
1	August 18	at New York Yankees	L 27–35	0–1	Freeport Municipal Stadium

== Schedule ==
Week	Date	Opponent	Result	Record	Venue	Game recap
1	August 27	**Los Angeles Dons**	**L** 0–7	0–1	Soldier Field	Recap
2	September 6	at Buffalo Bills	**L** 7–42	0–2	Civic Stadium	Recap
3	September 10	Baltimore Colts	**W** 21–14	1–2	Soldier Field	Recap
4	September 17	**Cleveland Browns**	**L** 7–28	1–3	Soldier Field	Recap
5	September 26	at **Cleveland Browns**	**L** 10–21	1–4	Cleveland Municipal Stadium	Recap
6	October 1	**San Francisco 49ers**	**L** 14–31	1–5	Soldier Field	Recap
7	October 8	at **Los Angeles Dons**	**L** 28–49	1–6	Los Angeles Memorial Coliseum	Recap
8	October 15	at Brooklyn Dodgers	**L** 7–21	1–7	Ebbets Field	Recap
9	October 24	Brooklyn Dodgers	**L** 14–35	1–8	Soldier Field	Recap
10	October 31	at New York Yankees	**L** 7–42	1–9	Yankee Stadium	Recap
11	November 7	at **San Francisco 49ers**	**L** 21–44	1–10	Kezar Stadium	Recap
12	November 14	at Baltimore Colts	**L** 24–38	1–11	Memorial Stadium	Recap
13	Bye					
14	November 25	Buffalo Bills	**L** 35–39	1–12	Soldier Field	Recap
15	December 4	New York Yankees	**L** 7–28	1–13	Soldier Field	Recap
Note: Intra-division opponents are in **bold** text.

== Division standings ==
AAFC Western Division
	W	L	T	PCT	DIV	PF	PA	STK
Cleveland Browns	14	0	0	1.000	6–0	389	190	W14
San Francisco 49ers	12	2	0	.857	4–2	495	248	W1
Los Angeles Dons	7	7	0	.500	2–4	258	305	L2
Chicago Rockets	1	13	0	.071	0–6	202	439	L11

Note: Tie games were not officially counted in the standings.

== Roster ==
1948 Chicago Rockets final roster
Quarterbacks: 65 Tom Farris; 60 Jesse Freitas; Backs: 86 Chuck Fenenbock S/RB; 74 Bill Kellagher CB/FB; 73 Ernie Lewis FB/CB/P; 82 Bob Livingstone RB; 78 Jim Mello FB; 84 Bob Perina CB/RB; 85 Julie Rykovich RB/CB; 83 Floyd Simmons FB; Ends/Receivers: 57 Bob Jensen; 54 Farnham Johnson; 55 Fay King; 56 Ray Kuffel; 52 Jim McCarthy K	Linemen/Linebackers: 33 George Bernhardt MG/G; 45 Ziggy Czarobski DT; 32 Bob David G/MG; 46 Ed Ecker T; 43 Nate Johnson T/DT; 44 Chet Kozel DT; 22 Peter Lamana MLB/C; 27 Fred Negus OLB/C; 30 Jim Pearcy G/MG; 35 Roman Piskor G/T; 34 Joe Ruetz OLB/G; 36 Gasper Urban MLB/OLB/G	Reserve: 87 Harry Clarke S/RB (IR); 80 Elroy Hirsch RB/S (IR); 77 Dewey Proctor FB (IR); 70 Eddie Prokop RB (IR); 20 John Rapacz T/C (IR); 44 Emil Uremovich T/DT (IR); rookies in italics
