= Joe Prokop (halfback) =

American football player (1921–1995)

Profile
- Position: Halfback

Personal information
- Born: January 9, 1921; Pennsylvania, U.S.
- Died: April 29, 1995 (aged 74)
- Listed height: 6 ft 2 in (1.88 m)
- Listed weight: 170 lb (77 kg)

Career information
- High school: Cathedral Latin (Cleveland, Ohio)
- College: Bradley
- NFL draft: 1948: undrafted

Career history
- Chicago Rockets (1948)
- Stats at Pro Football Reference

Joseph Michael Prokop (January 9, 1921 – April 29, 1995) was an American professional football halfback who played one season with the Chicago Rockets of the All-America Football Conference (AAFC). He played college football at the University of Notre Dame and Bradley University.

== Early life and college ==
Joseph Michael Prokop was born on January 9, 1921, in Pennsylvania. He attended Cathedral Latin High School in Cleveland.

Prokop played college football for the Notre Dame Fighting Irish of the University of Notre Dame from 1940 to 1941. He also participated in track at Notre Dame. Prokop later played football for the Bradley Braves of Bradley University from 1946 to 1947.

== Professional career ==
In May 1948, it was reported that Prokop was considering signing with the Chicago Rockets of the All-America Football Conference (AAFC). Prokop stated that Rockets head coach Edward McKeever was going to award him a contract if he reported to training camp on July 18. McKeever was Prokop's freshman coach at Notre Dame. On July 28, it was reported that Prokop had been released by the Rockets. However, Prokop later returned to the Rockets and played in two games for the team during the 1948 AAFC season as a halfback. He stood 6'2" and weighed 170 pounds during his pro career.
