= John Sanchez (American football) =

American football player (1920–1992)

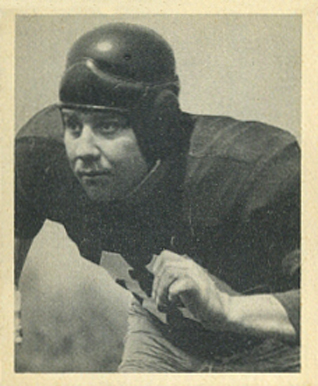
- Sanchez on a 1948 Bowman football card

No. 77, 49, 70
- Position: Offensive tackle

Personal information
- Born: October 12, 1920; Los Angeles, California, U.S.
- Died: September 11, 1992 (aged 71); Hayward, California, U.S.
- Listed height: 6 ft 3 in (1.91 m)
- Listed weight: 239 lb (108 kg)

Career information
- High school: San Diego (San Diego, California)
- College: Redlands; San Francisco
- NFL draft: 1944: 9th round, 81st overall pick

Career history
- Chicago Rockets (1947); Detroit Lions (1947); Washington Redskins (1947-1949); New York Giants (1949-1950)

Awards and highlights
- First-team Little All-American (1942); First-team All-PCC (1942)

Career NFL statistics
- Games played: 41
- Games started: 24
- Fumble recoveries: 1
- Stats at Pro Football Reference

John Claude Sanchez (October 12, 1920 – September 11, 1992) was an American professional football offensive tackle in the National Football League (NFL) for the Detroit Lions, Washington Redskins, and the New York Giants. He also played in the All-America Football Conference (AAFC) for the Chicago Rockets. Sanchez played college football at the University of San Francisco and was drafted in the ninth round of the 1944 NFL draft by the Giants.
