= Julie Rykovich =

American football player (1923–1974)

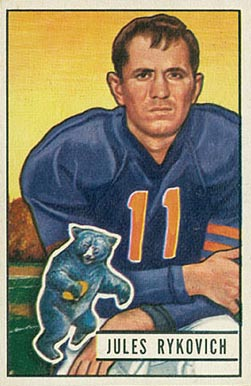
- Rykovich on a 1951 Bowman football card

No. 86, 85, 11, 20
- Positions: Halfback, defensive back

Personal information
- Born: April 6, 1923; Gary, Indiana, U.S.
- Died: December 22, 1974 (aged 51); Merrillville, Indiana, U.S.
- Listed height: 6 ft 2 in (1.88 m)
- Listed weight: 204 lb (93 kg)

Career information
- High school: Lew Wallace (Gary)
- College: Illinois (1942, 1946); Notre Dame (1943)
- NFL draft: 1946: 2nd round, 14th overall pick

Career history
- Buffalo Bills (1947–1948); Chicago Rockets (1948); Chicago Bears (1949–1951); Washington Redskins (1952–1953)

Awards and highlights
- National champion (1943); Second-team All-Big Nine (1946); Co-MVP in 1947 Rose Bowl; Rose Bowl Hall of Fame (1993)

Career NFL/AAFC statistics
- Rushing yards: 2,584
- Rushing average: 4
- Receptions: 75
- Receiving yards: 1,158
- Total touchdowns: 32
- Stats at Pro Football Reference

Julius Alphonsus Rykovich (April 6, 1923 – December 23, 1974) was an American professional football halfback, kickoff returner, and defensive back in the National Football League (NFL) for the Washington Redskins and the Chicago Bears. Rykovich also played in the All-America Football Conference (AAFC) for the Buffalo Bills and the Chicago Rockets. He played college football at the University of Illinois and the University of Notre Dame and was drafted in the second round of the 1946 NFL draft. He was co-MVP alongside Buddy Young in the 1947 Rose Bowl for Illinois, and was inducted into the Rose Bowl Hall of Fame in 1993.

== NFL/AAFC career statistics ==
Legend
**Bold**	Career high

=== Regular season ===
Year	Team	Games		Rushing					Receiving				
Year	Team	GP	GS	Att	Yds	Avg	Lng	TD	Rec	Yds	Avg	Lng	TD
1947	BUF	12	9	92	**414**	4.5	-	4	4	44	11.0	-	0
1948	BUF	6	2	43	249	**5.8**	-	5	2	-7	-3.5	-	0
1948	CHR	6	4	53	176	3.3	-	1	3	78	**26.0**	-	0
1949	CHI	11	3	88	340	3.9	18	6	16	210	13.1	45	**2**
1950	CHI	12	9	**122**	394	3.2	18	**7**	**21**	**344**	16.4	39	0
1951	CHI	12	10	83	399	4.8	**56**	4	6	133	22.2	**51**	0
1952	WAS	11	9	94	361	3.8	21	1	16	283	17.7	42	1
1953	WAS	12	12	73	251	3.4	19	0	7	73	10.4	39	1
		82	58	648	2,584	4.0	56	28	75	1,158	15.4	51	4

=== Playoffs ===
Year	Team	Games		Rushing					Receiving				
Year	Team	GP	GS	Att	Yds	Avg	Lng	TD	Rec	Yds	Avg	Lng	TD
1950	CHI	1	1	14	67	4.8	23	0	1	8	8.0	8	0
		1	1	14	67	4.8	23	0	1	8	8.0	8	0
