= Jesse Freitas =

Jesse Freitas may refer to:

- Jesse Freitas Sr. (1921–2020), American football quarterback, played professionally 1946–1949
- Jesse Freitas Jr. (1951–2015), American football quarterback, played professionally 1974–1975
