= Peter Lamana =

American football player (1921–2007)

- Peter Lamana, 1942

No. 71
- Positions: Linebacker, center, fullback

Personal information
- Born: May 15, 1921; Bristol, Connecticut, U.S.
- Died: August 7, 2007 (aged 86); Berwyn, Illinois, U.S.
- Listed height: 5 ft 11 in (1.80 m)
- Listed weight: 210 lb (95 kg)

Career information
- High school: Cathedral (MA)
- College: Boston University (1941–1942)

Career history
- Chicago Rockets (1946–1948)

Career statistics
- Games played: 35
- Stats at Pro Football Reference

Peter Charles Lamana (May 15, 1921 – August 7, 2007) was an American football player who played at the linebacker, center, and fullback positions.

A native of Bristol, Connecticut, he attended Cathedral High School in Springfield, Massachusetts. He was teammates with Angelo Bertelli at Cathedral. He then played college football for Boston University in 1941 and 1942.

During World War II, Lamana served in the U.S. Army's 78th Division. After his discharge from the military, he returend to Boston University and was elected as captain of the 1946 football team. However, in August 1946, Lamana instead signed to play professional football for the Chicago Rockets of the All-America Football Conference. He played for the Rockets from 1946 to 1948, appearing in 34 or 35 games.

After his football career ended, he worked in human resources for Marshall Field's and Co. He died in 2007 at age 87 at MacNeal Hospital in Berwyn, Illinois.
