= List of Benedictine Ravens in the NFL draft =

This is a list of Benedictine Ravens players who have been selected in the NFL draft.

== Key ==
B	Back	K	Kicker	NT	Nose tackle
C	Center	LB	Linebacker	FB	Fullback
DB	Defensive back	P	Punter	HB	Halfback
DE	Defensive end	QB	Quarterback	WR	Wide receiver
DT	Defensive tackle	RB	Running back	G	Guard
E	End	T	Offensive tackle	TE	Tight end

== Selections ==
Year	Round	Pick	Overall	Player	Team	Position
1943	3	8	23	Irv Comp	Green Bay Packers	G
1943	8	6	66	Larry Visnic	New York Giants	B
1954	27	12	325	Dick Rzeszut	Detroit Lions	C
1955	14	11	168	Jerry Gajda	Detroit Lions	B
1958	15	12	181	Jerry Mohlman	Detroit Lions	B
1959	17	6	198	Jerome Jurczak	San Francisco 49ers	C
1961	8	9	107	Larry Muff	Detroit Lions	E
1965	20	10	276	Jim Chandler	Green Bay Packers	RB
1966	10	15	155	Claude Brownlee	Baltimore Colts	DE
1987	3	22	78	Jamie Mueller	Buffalo Bills	RB
