= 1942 All-Pacific Coast football team =

American all-star college football team

The 1942 All-Pacific Coast football team consisted of American football players chosen by various organizations for All-Pacific Coast teams for the 1942 college football season. The organizations selecting teams in 1942 included the Associated Press (AP) and the United Press (UP).

UCLA, Washington State, Stanford and USC finished first through fourth, respectively, in the Pacific Coast Conference (PCC), and each of those teams placed two players named on the first teams selected by either the AP or UP. Conference champion UCLA was ranked No. 13 in the final AP poll and was represented by quarterback Bob Waterfield (AP, UP) and guard Jack Lescoulie (AP, UP). Stanford was ranked No. 12 in the final AP poll and was represented by guard Chuck Taylor (AP, UP), a College Football Hall of Fame inductee, and tackle Ed Stamm (AP, UP).

Three players from teams outside the PCC received first-team honors from the AP: halfback Jesse Freitas and end Alyn Beals from the Santa Clara Broncos and tackle John Sanchez from the San Francisco Dons.

== All-Pacific Coast selections ==
=== Quarterback ===
- Bob Waterfield, UCLA (AP-1; UP-1)
- Bob Erickson, Washington (AP-3)

=== Halfbacks ===
- Mickey McCardle, USC (AP-1; UP-1)
- Jesse Freitas, Santa Clara (AP-1)
- Tom Roblin, Oregon (AP-2; UP-1)
- Jim Jurovich, California (AP-2)
- Al Solari, UCLA (AP-2)
- Vince Pacewic, Loyola (AP-2)
- Jackie Fellows, Fresno State (AP-3)
- Joe Day, Oregon State (AP-3)

=== Fullback ===
- Bob Kennedy, Washington State (AP-1; UP-1)
- Randall Fawcett, Stanford (AP-3)

=== Ends ===
- John Ferguson, California (AP-1; UP-1)
- Alyn Beals, Santa Clara (AP-1)
- Nick Susoeff, Washington State (AP-2; UP-1)
- Ralph Heywood, USC (AP-2)
- Hank Norberg, Stanford (AP-3)
- Milt Smith, UCLA (AP-3)

=== Tackles ===
- Ed Stamm, Stanford (AP-1; UP-1)
- John Sanchez, Univ. of San Francisco (AP-1)
- Norm Verry, USC (AP-3; UP-1)
- Bruno Banducci, Stanford (AP-2)
- Charles Fears, UCLA (AP-2)
- Lloyd Wickett, Oregon State (AP-3)

=== Guards ===
- Jack Lescoulie, UCLA (AP-1; UP-1)
- Chuck Taylor, Stanford (AP-1; UP-1) (College Football Hall of Fame)
- Bill Seixas, USC (AP-2)
- Al Schiro, Santa Clara (AP-2)
- Floyd Rhea, Oregon (AP-3)
- Loren LaPrade, Stanford (AP-3)

=== Centers ===
- Walt Harrison, Washington (AP-1; UP-1)
- Al Santucci, Santa Clara (AP-2)
- Bill Armstrong, UCLA (AP-3)

== Key ==
AP = Associated Press

UP = United Press

Bold = Consensus first-team selection of both the AP and UP

== See also ==
- 1942 College Football All-America Team
