= 1941 Los Angeles City Cubs football team =

American college football season

1941 Los Angeles City Cubs football
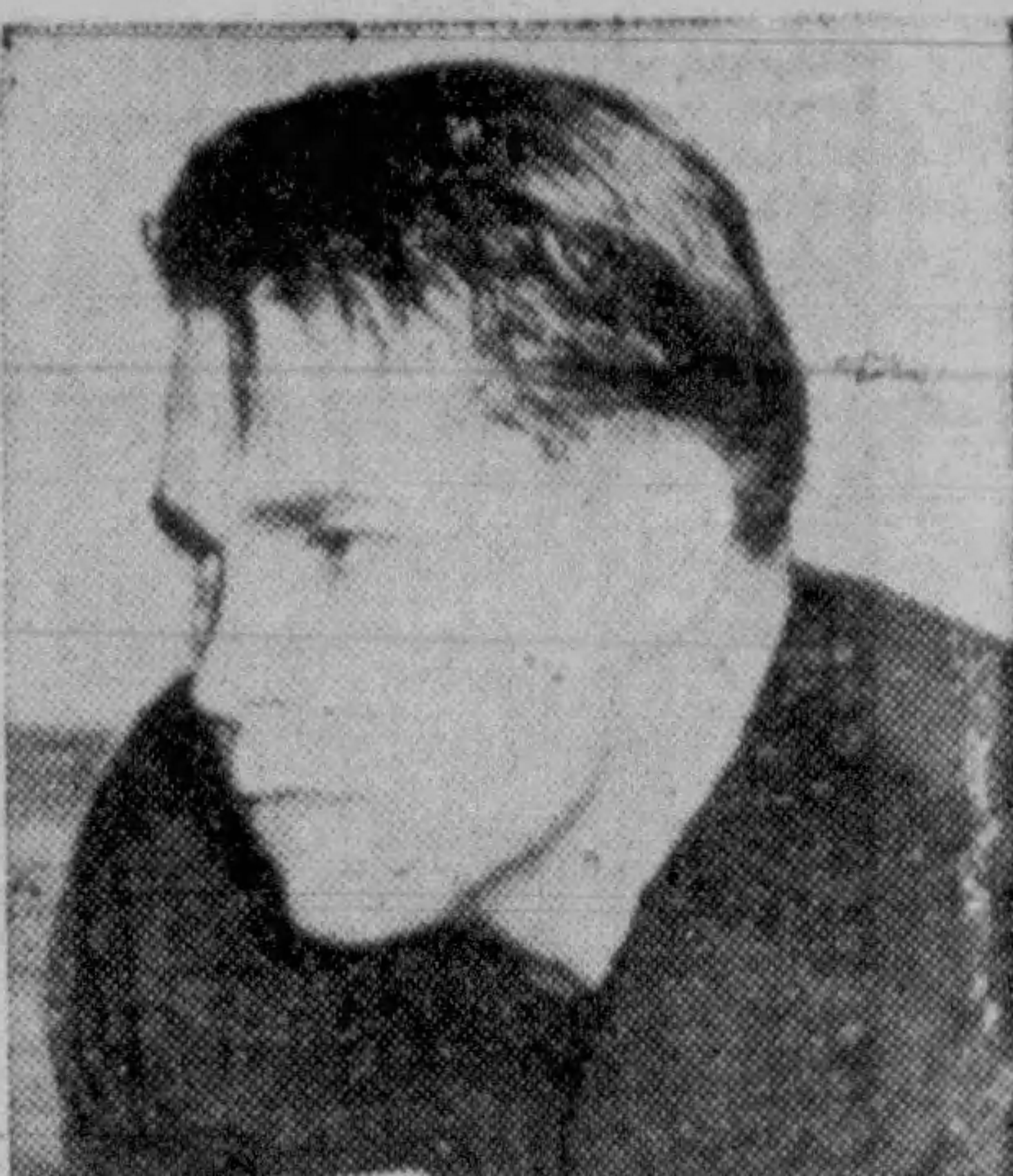
- LACC most valuable player Jackie Fellows, 1941

Metropolitan champion
- Conference: Metropolitan Conference
- Record: 10–0 (6–0 Metropolitan)
- Head coach: Glenn Ackerman (11th season)
- Home stadium: Snyder Field, Gilmore Stadium

1941 Metropolitan Conference football standings
	Conf.					Overall
Team	W		L		T	W		L		T
Los Angeles City $	6	–	0	–	0	10	–	0	–	0
Ventura	4	–	2	–	0	6	–	4	–	0
Bakersfield	3	–	3	–	0	5	–	4	–	1
Compton	2	–	3	–	1	?	–	?	–	?
Long Beach	2	–	3	–	1	?	–	?	–	?
Santa Monica	2	–	4	–	0	?	–	?	–	?
Glendale (CA)	1	–	5	–	0	?	–	?	–	?
$ – Conference champion

The 1941 Los Angeles City Cubs football team was an American football team that represented Los Angeles City College (LACC) as a member of the Metropolitan Conference during the 1941 junior college football season. In their 11th year under head coach Glenn Ackerman, the Cubs compiled a perfect 10–0 record, won the Metropolitan Conference championship, and outscored opponents by a total of 253 to 84. It was the first perfect season in LACC program history.

Halfback Jackie Fellows was the leading scorer in the Metropolitan Conference; he was named junior college player of year by the all-Southern California Board of Football. Fellows and two other LACC players were selected as first-team players on the all-Metropolitan Conference football team. The others were Johnny Beauchamp and Rex Schroder. Fellows and Beauchamp were also selected as first-team players on the all-state junior college football team; Fellows was selected unanimously.

The team played its home games at LACC's Snyder Field (capacity 6,500), but the final game against Sacramento City was moved to Gilmore Stadium due to the high demand for seats.

== Schedule ==
Date	Opponent	Site	Result	Attendance	Source
September 27	at San Francisco Junior College*	San Francisco, CA	W 14–0		
October 3	at Riverside*	Riverside, CA	W 37–13		
October 10	Bakersfield	Snyder Field; Los Angeles, CA	W 33–22		
October 24	at Ventura	Poli Street Bowl; Ventura, CA	W 25–12	5,731	
October 31	at Pasadena*	Rose Bowl; Pasadena, CA	W 33–12	26,000	
November 8	vs. Glendale	Rose Bowl; Pasadena, CA	W 12–0		
November 14	at Santa Monica	Santa Monica Municipal Stadium; Santa Monica, CA	W 26–12	> 7,000	
November 19	vs. Long Beach City	Compton, CA	W 13–6		
November 28	at Compton	Compton, CA	W 27–0	10,000	
December 5	Sacramento City*	Gilmore Stadium; Los Angeles, CA	W 33–7	10,000	
*Non-conference game
