= 1942 Little All-America college football team =

American college football all-star team

The 1942 Little All-America college football team is composed of college football players from small colleges and universities who were selected by the Associated Press (AP) as the best players at each position. For 1942, the AP selected first, second, and third teams.

Due to the impact of World War II, the AP did not pick another Little All-America team until 1945.

== First-team ==
Position	Player	Team
B	Virgil Wagner	Millikin
B	Rudy Mobley	Hardin–Simmons
B	Jimmy Jones	Union (TN)
B	Vince Pacewic	Loyola–Los Angeles
E	Adrian Hasse	Amherst
E	Aubrey Faust	Wofford
T	John Sanchez	San Francisco
T	Joe Kiernan	Rockhurst
G	Hugh Bogovich	Delaware
G	Warren Schmakel	Central Michigan
C	Vincent Zachem	Morehead State

== Second-team ==
Position	Player	Team
B	Dwight Holshouser	Catawba
B	Jackie Fellows	Fresno State
B	Bill Schmidt	Williams
B	Pete Gorgone	Muhlenberg
E	Ray Sandvig	Augustana (SD)
E	Bob Stokes	Howard Payne
T	T. J. Campion	Southeastern Louisiana
T	George Gagliardi	Miami (FL)
G	Doyle Caraway	Texas Tech
G	Larry Visnic	St. Benedict's (KS)
C	Ed Bolduc	Washburn

== Third-team ==
Position	Player	Team
B	Del Huntsinger	Portland
B	Eddie McGovern	Rose Poly
B	Bob Ruman	Arizona
B	Art Jones	Haverford
E	Emil Lussow	Dubuque
E	Murray Hanna	Alma
T	Paul Newell	Nebraska State Teachers
T	Gregory Thomas	Rochester
G	Pershing Scott	Rollins
G	Gene Volpi	Colorado Mines
C	E. W. Grubbs	Sam Houston State

== See also ==
- 1942 College Football All-America Team
