= Gary Keithley =

American football player (born 1951)

No. 12
- Positions: Quarterback, punter

Personal information
- Born: January 11, 1951 (age 75); Alvin, Texas, U.S.
- Listed height: 6 ft 3 in (1.91 m)
- Listed weight: 210 lb (95 kg)

Career information
- High school: Alvin
- College: Texas; UTEP
- NFL draft: 1973: 2nd round, 45th overall pick

Career history
- St. Louis Cardinals (1973); Seattle Seahawks (preseason only) (1976); BC Lions (1977–1978)

Awards and highlights
- National champion (1970); 1971 Cotton Bowl Classic champion

Career NFL statistics
- Passing attempts: 73
- Passing completions: 32
- Completion percentage: 43.8%
- TD–INT: 1–5
- Passing yards: 369
- Passer rating: 35.7
- Punts: 66
- Punting yards: 2,478
- Punting average: 37.5
- Stats at Pro Football Reference

Gary Keithley (born January 11, 1951) is an American former professional football player who was a quarterback and punter in the National Football League (NFL). He played college football for the Texas Longhorns and UTEP Miners.

At Alvin High School, he was the starting quarterback for 3 years, an All-State Quarterback and he finished in the top 5 for passing yards each of his 3 seasons. He led the Yellowjackets to the Texas Class 3A Semifinals in 1968.

Keithley played college football at the University of Texas at Austin in 1970 and then transferred to the University of Texas at El Paso for his last two seasons. In 1969 he played with the freshman team at Texas. The next year he won the Southwest Conference Championship, Cotton Bowl and National Championship with Texas, but as the 3rd string QB who only threw 5 passes all season and scored a single rushing touchdown against California in the first game of the season. After some time at Alvin Junior College, he transferred to UTEP where he was the starting QB for the two seasons and set records for single-season rushing TD for quarterbacks, career completion percentage. He had 5 games with over 200 yards of passing (2 with 300+ yards) and also shared punting duties while he was at UTEP. Keithley made the All-WAC Academic team in his senior year.

Playing for the St. Louis Cardinals primarily as a backup to Jim Hart, he had a 0.0 passer rating in each of his first two career starts in 1973, the only quarterback in NFL history to do this in back-to-back games. Despite the dubious statistic, Keithley won in his first start against the Atlanta Falcons, a 32–10 victory in which he completed just two of ten passes for nine yards and an interception that was returned for a touchdown. The following year, Keithley lost his backup role to Dennis Shaw, who played for Cardinals head coach Don Coryell in college, while his punting duties were reassigned to rookie punter Hal Roberts. Still with the Cardinal in 1974 and 1975, he never played those two seasons. He was picked up by the Seattle Seahawks in the 1976 expansion draft but did not make the roster.

He was the backup quarterback of the BC Lions in 1977 and 1978.

Keithley became a high school football coach. He was the Offensive Coordinator at Cleburne High Schools starting in 1996 and then became the head coach for 4 years starting in 1997. He coached the team to the playoffs in 2002 and served as the Cleburne ISD's Athletic Director before retiring in 2010.

In 2009 he was in the inaugural class for the Alvin ISD Athletic Hall of Honor.

His son Gary Keithley Jr. was selected by the New York Yankees in the 33rd round of the 2003 MLB June Amateur Draft, but never played professional baseball at any level.
