= Glenn Ackerman =

American football and basketball coach, college athletics administrator

Biographical details
- Born: August 9, 1897
- Died: September 16, 1966 (aged 69); Laguna Woods, California, U.S.

Coaching career (HC unless noted)

Football
- c. 1925: Courtland HS (CA)
- 1926–1929: Sutter Creek HS (CA)
- 1930: Los Angeles City (line)
- 1931–1941: Los Angeles City
- 1952: Los Angeles City

Basketball
- 1926–1930: Sutter Creek HS (CA)
- 1930–?: Los Angeles City

Administrative career (AD unless noted)
- 1946–?: Los Angeles City

Accomplishments and honors

Championships
- Football; 2 Metropolitan Conference (1940–1941)

Glenn Chester Ackerman (August 9, 1897 – September 16, 1966) was an American football, basketball, and baseball coach and college athletics administrator. He served two stints at the head football coach at Los Angeles City College (LACC), from 1931 to 1941 and again in 1952. Ackerman led his 1941 Los Angeles City Cubs football team to a perfect 10–0 record and a Metropolitan Conference title. He also coached basketball and baseball at LACC and was the school's athletic director.

Ackerman graduated from Oregon State College—now known as Oregon State University. He coached at Courtland High School and Sutter Creek High School in California before he was hired, in 1930, as head basketball coach and line coach for the football team at LACC.

Ackerman died on September 16, 1966, at his home in Laguna Woods, California.
