= Warren Schmakel =

American football player, coach, scout and administrator

Biographical details
- Born: November 3, 1920; Toledo, Ohio, U.S.
- Died: November 17, 1982 (aged 62); Lincoln, Nebraska, U.S.

Playing career
- 1940–1942: Central Michigan

Coaching career (HC unless noted)
- 1946–1947: Toledo (line)
- 1948–1949: Miami (OH) (line)
- 1950: Central Michigan
- 1951–1952: Miami (OH) (line)
- 1957–1959: Nebraska (freshmen)
- 1960–1963: Rutgers (line)
- 1964–1968: Boston University

Administrative career (AD unless noted)
- 1969–1970: Boston University (asst. AD)
- 1970–1974: Boston University
- 1974–1979: Illinois State

Head coaching record
- Overall: 26–28–2

Accomplishments and honors

Awards
- First-team Little All-American (1942)

Warren Hugo Paul Schmakel (November 3, 1920 – November 17, 1982) was an American football player, coach, scout, and college athletics administrator. He served as the head football coach at Central Michigan University in 1950 and at Boston University from 1964 to 1968, compiling a career college football record of 26–28–2. Schmakel later served as the athletic director at Boston University and at Illinois State University, and as a scout for the San Francisco 49ers of the National Football League (NFL).

== Playing ==
Schmakel graduated from Libbey High School in Toledo, Ohio. He played guard for the Central Michigan Chippewas football team and was named to the 1942 Little All-America college football team. He received his bachelor's degree from Central Michigan in 1943 and earned a master's degree from Columbia University in 1948.

== Coaching ==
Schmakel served in the United States Navy during World War II and began his coaching career in 1946 under his former high school coach, Bill Orwig, at the University of Toledo. In 1948, he signed a contract to become the head football coach at Bay City High School in Bay City, Michigan, but left before the season began to become an assistant at Miami University. He left in 1950 to become head coach at his alma mater, Central Michigan, and was replaced on the Miami coaching staff by Ara Parseghian. Schmakel resigned after one season and returned to Miami. In 1954, he became the chief of the plans and operations section of the United States Army European athletic office. He returned to college football in 1957 as an assistant at Nebraska. In 1960, he became the line coach at Rutgers. He helped lead the 1961 Rutgers Scarlet Knights football team to an undefeated season.

On January 9, 1964, Schmakel was named head football coach at Boston University. In his five seasons as head coach, Schmakel led the Terriers to a 20–24–2 record. He coached a number of players who went on to play in the NFL, including Bruce Taylor, Reggie Rucker, and Pat Hughes. The 1969 Boston University Terriers football team, composed of players Schmakel recruited and coached by his former lead assistant Larry Naviaux, played in that year's Pasadena Bowl.

== Administration ==
In 1969, Schmakel stepped down as football coach to become BU's assistant athletic director. He was promoted to AD the following year after the departure of Bob Peck. In 1971, he hired the university's first black head coach when he named Ron Mitchell head men's basketball coach.

In 1974, Schmakel took the same job at Illinois State University. He remained in this position until July 31, 1979.

== Later life ==
After leaving Illinois State, Schmakel became a college scout for the San Francisco 49ers. He fell ill while on a scouting trip in Nebraska and went to Lincoln General Hospital for a colostomy. An infection set in and on November 17, 1982. died from a blood clot in the lung. A resident of Oakland, California at the time of his death, he was buried in Topsfield, Massachusetts, where he had lived while working at BU.

== Head coaching record ==
Year	Team	Overall	Conference	Standing	Bowl/playoffs
Central Michigan Chippewas (Interstate Intercollegiate Athletic Conference) (1950)
1950	Central Michigan	6–4	2–2	T–3rd	
Central Michigan:		6–4	2–2		
Boston University Terriers (NCAA University Division independent) (1964–1965)
1964	Boston University	2–7			
1965	Boston University	5–3–1			
Boston University Terriers (NCAA College Division independent) (1966–1967)
1966	Boston University	5–5			
1967	Boston University	3–6			
1968	Boston University	5–3–1			
Boston University:		20–24–2			
Total:		26–28–2			
