= Jim O'Neal (guard) =

American football player (1924–1959)

Profile
- Position: Guard

Personal information
- Born: February 13, 1924; Anna, Texas
- Died: October 13, 1959 (aged 35); Waller County, Texas
- Listed height: 6 ft 1 in (1.85 m)
- Listed weight: 230 lb (104 kg)

Career information
- High school: Anna (Anna, Texas)
- College: TCU, Texas Mines, Southwestern (TX)

Career history
- Chicago Rockets (1946-1947)
- Stats at Pro Football Reference

James C. Summer O'Neal (February 13, 1924 – October 13, 1959) was an American football guard.

O'Neal was born in Anna, Texas, and attended Anna High School. He played college football for TCU, Texas Mines and Southwestern (TX).

He played professional football in the All-America Football Conference for the Chicago Rockets from 1946 to 1947. He appeared in 24 games, seven as a starter.

O'Neal died in 1959 in Waller County, Texas.
