= Ed Parks =

American football player (1915–1976)

Mickey Parks
No. 27
- Positions: Guard, center, linebacker

Personal information
- Born: December 4, 1915; Shawnee, Oklahoma, U.S.
- Died: September 27, 1976 (aged 60); Yountville, California, U.S.
- Listed height: 6 ft 0 in (1.83 m)
- Listed weight: 225 lb (102 kg)

Career information
- College: Oklahoma
- NFL draft: 1938: 9th round, 79th overall pick

Career history
- Washington Redskins (1938–1940); Chicago Rockets (1946)

Career NFL statistics
- Games played: 37
- Games started: 13
- Stats at Pro Football Reference

Edward Harry "Mickey" Parks (December 4, 1915 – September, 1976) was an American football player. He was one of nine children and his parents were James Hiram and Laura Belle Robbins Parks. He graduated from Shawnee (Oklahoma) High School in 1933. Parks played college football at the University of Oklahoma and was named All-Big 6 twice. He was drafted in the ninth round of the 1938 NFL draft by the Washington Redskins. He played for the Washington Redskins for three years, earning All-Pro honors. He was center on the 1940 Eastern League Championship team that was defeated by the Chicago Bears, 73–0. One of his teammates was Sammy Baugh. After serving in the military in World War II he played in the All-America Football Conference (AAFC) for the Chicago Rockets.
