= Ned Mathews =

American football player (1918–2002)

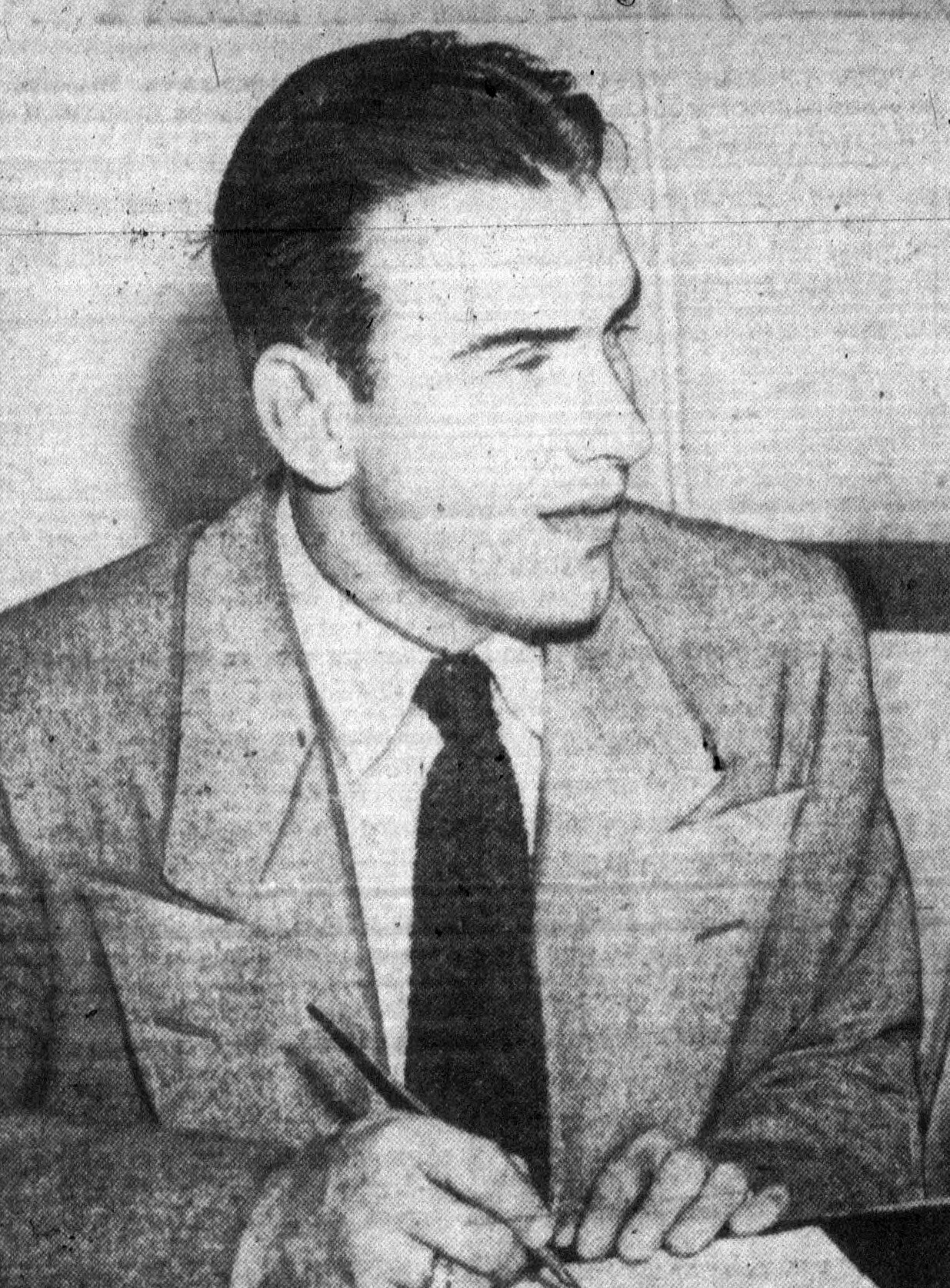
- Mathews, circa 1948

Profile
- Position: Running back

Personal information
- Born: August 11, 1918; Provo, Utah, U.S.
- Died: September 18, 2002 (aged 84)

Career information
- College: UCLA

Career history

Playing
- 1941–1943: Detroit Lions
- 1944: Hollywood Rangers
- 1945: Boston Yanks
- 1946: Chicago Rockets
- 1947: San Francisco 49ers

Coaching
- 1946: Chicago Rockets
- 1948: UCLA
- 1949–1951: Arizona

Ned Alfred Mathews (August 11, 1918 – September 18, 2002) was an American professional football player who was a running back for four seasons in the National Football League (NFL) for the Detroit Lions and Boston Yanks. With the Lions, he led the league in kickoff returns and ranked second in interceptions thrown. He also played in the American Football League for the Hollywood Rangers, with whom he scored 18 touchdowns on 65 carries. Mathews was a college football quarterback for the UCLA Bruins.

In 1945, Mathews entered the United States Army and coached football, basketball, and baseball for Fort MacArthur. Upon his discharge a year later, he was a player-coach for the Chicago Rockets in the All-America Football Conference before joining the San Francisco 49ers. He returned to UCLA as a backfield coach in 1948 and served in the same position at Arizona the following year. He coached at Arizona for two years; after the 1951 season, amid turmoil involving incumbent head coach Bob Winslow, Mathews was suggested as his successor by the team's players, but the program instead hired Warren B. Woodson who did not retain Mathews. Mathews remained in Tucson as a businessman.
