= Bill Schroeder (halfback) =

American football and basketball player (1923–2003)

Biographical details
- Born: April 11, 1923; Sheboygan, Wisconsin, U.S.
- Died: December 9, 2003 (aged 80); Sheboygan, Wisconsin, U.S.

Playing career

Football
- 1941–1943: Wisconsin
- 1946–1947: Chicago Rockets

Basketball
- 1940–1943: Wisconsin
- 1946–1947: Sheboygan Red Skins
- Positions: Halfback (football); Guard / forward (basketball)

William Henry Schroeder (April 11, 1923 – December 9, 2003) was an American professional two-sport athlete, playing both football and basketball during the 1940s.

A two-sport standout for the University of Wisconsin–Madison, Schroeder then played two seasons in the All-America Football Conference for the Chicago Rockets (1946, 1947) after serving in World War II. He played in 26 career games. On the hardwood, Schroeder competed in the National Basketball League for the Sheboygan Red Skins during the 1946–47 season and averaged 1.7 points per game. After his professional sports careers ended, Schroeder worked as an insurance salesman.
