= Norm Verry =

American football player and coach (1922–1961)

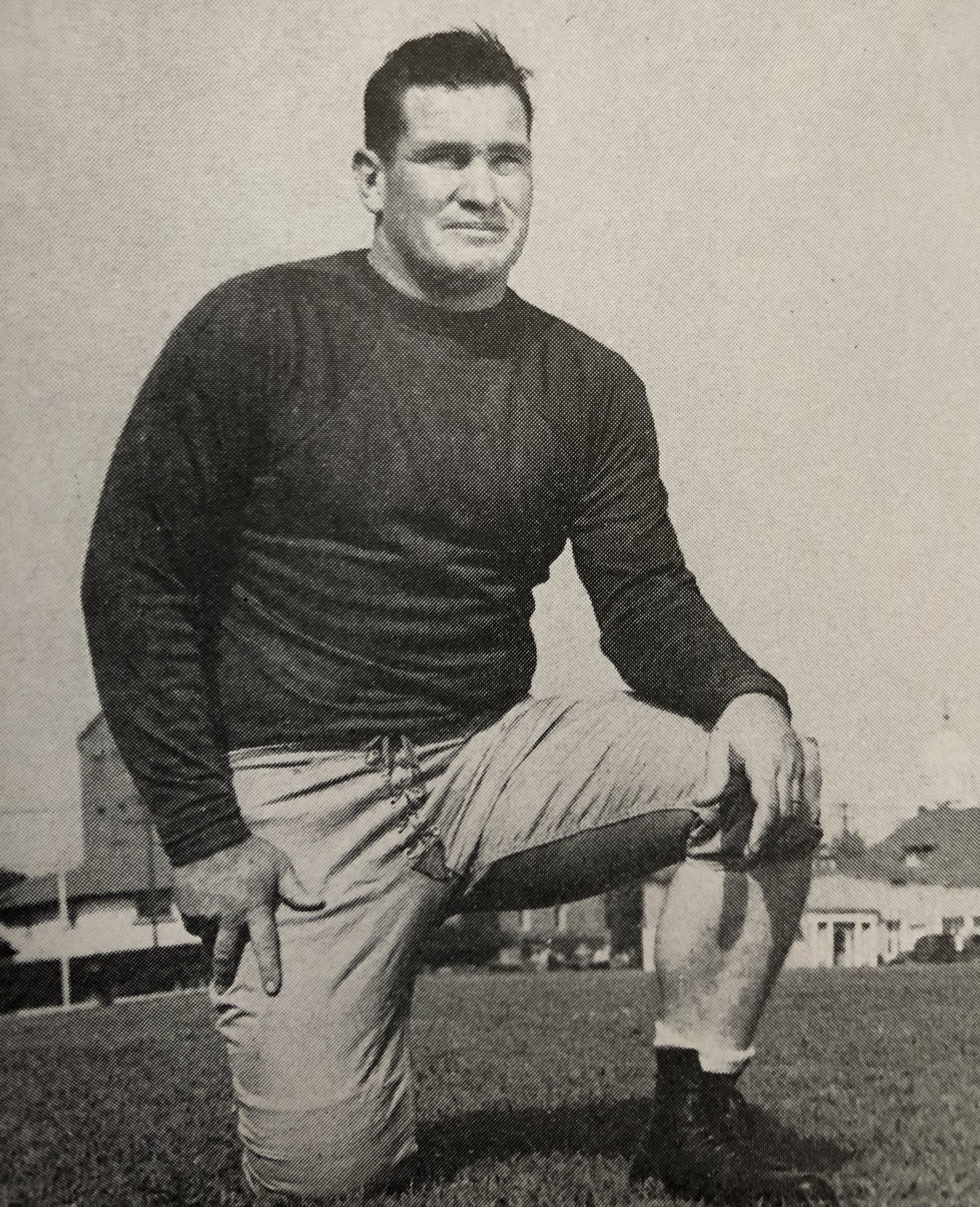
- Verry, c. 1948 at USC

No. 40, 49
- Position: Tackle

Personal information
- Born: September 18, 1922; Hanford, California, U.S.
- Died: October 12, 1961 (aged 39); Los Angeles, California, U.S.
- Listed height: 6 ft 1 in (1.85 m)
- Listed weight: 240 lb (109 kg)

Career information
- High school: Visalia (Visalia, California)
- College: USC (1941–1943)
- NFL draft: 1943: 9th round, 78th overall pick

Career history

Playing
- Chicago Rockets (1946–1947)

Coaching
- USC (1947–1948) Line coach; Inglewood HS (CA) Assistant coach; El Camino (1950–1961) Line coach; El Camino (1952–1960) Head coach

Awards and highlights
- Third-team All-American (1942); First-team All-PCC (1942)

Career AAFC statistics
- Games played: 11
- Games started: 4
- Stats at Pro Football Reference

Head coaching record
- Career: 54–27–2 (.663)

David Norman Verry (September 18, 1922 – October 12, 1961) was an American professional football player and coach. He played college football at the University of California (USC), earning third-team All-America and first-team All-Pacific Coast honors in 1942 as Tackle. Verry played professionally with Chicago Rockets of the All-America Football Conference (AAFC) from 1946 to 1947. He served as the head football coach at El Camino College in Alondra Park, California from 1952 to 1960, compiling a record of 54–27–2.

Verry coached the line at his alma mater, USC, in 1947 and 1948. In 1949, he assisted Marty Arnaga in coaching the football team at Inglewood High School in Inglewood, California. He joined the staff at El Camino as line coach in 1950 and succeeded Ambrose Schindler as head football coach two years later.

Verry died on October 12, 1961, at St. Vincent's Hospital in Los Angeles, after suffering a brain hemorrhage three weeks prior.

== Head coaching record ==
Year	Team	Overall	Conference	Standing	Bowl/playoffs
El Camino Warriors (Metropolitan Conference) (1952–1960)
1952	El Camino	8–1	7–0	1st	
1953	El Camino	6–3	4–3	T–3rd	
1954	El Camino	9–1	7–0	1st	L Junior Rose Bowl
1955	El Camino	7–1–2	5–1–1	T–2nd	
1956	El Camino	7–3	4–3	T–4th	
1957	El Camino	4–5	2–5	T–6th	
1958	El Camino	3–5	2–4	6th	
1959	El Camino	5–4	3–4	T–5th	
1960	El Camino	5–4	4–3	4th	
El Camino:		54–27–2	38–23–1		
Total:		54–27–2			
National championship Conference title Conference division title or championship game berth
