= Zygmont Czarobski =

American football player (1922–1984)

Ziggy Czarobski
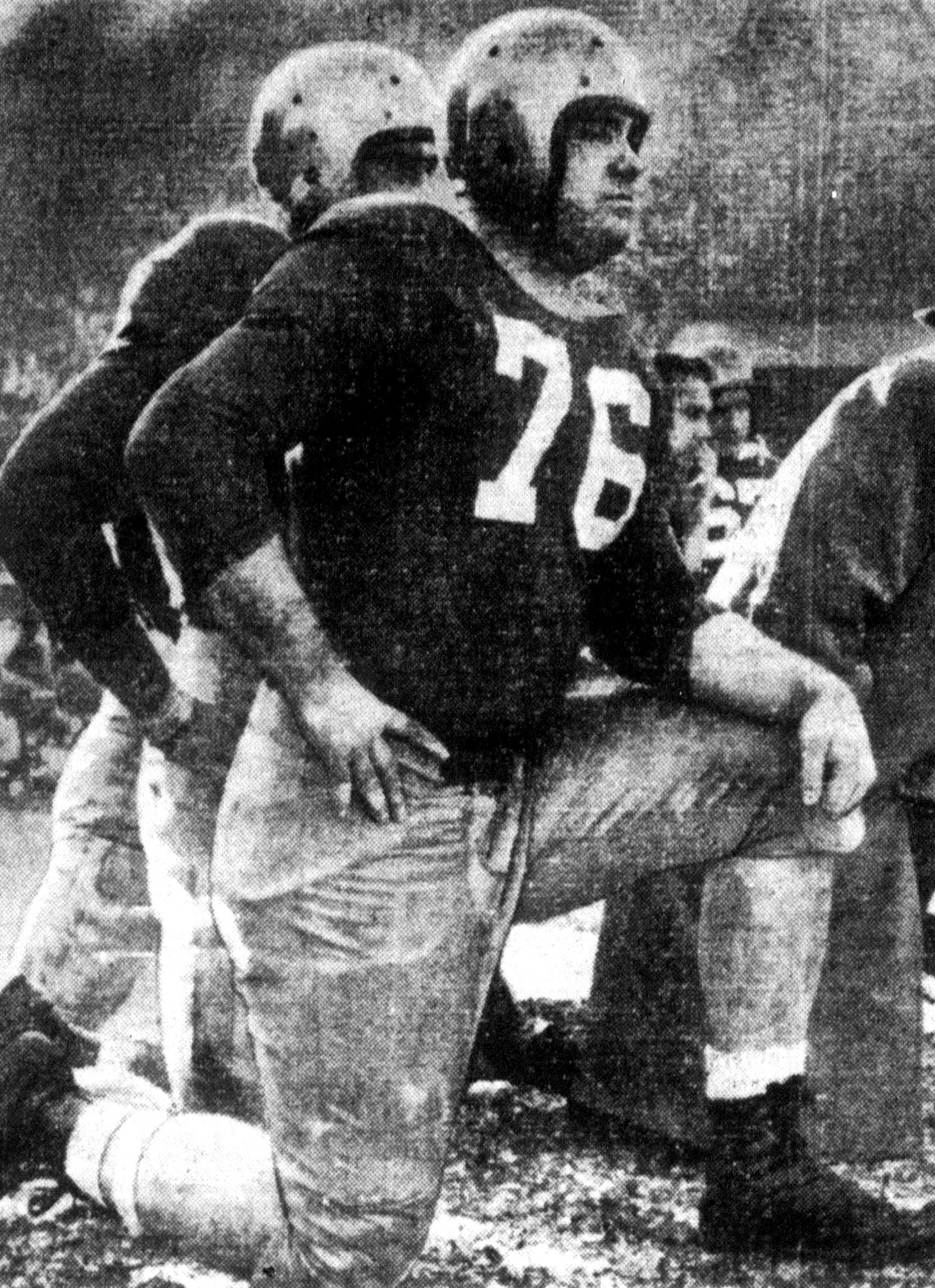
- Czarobski in 1947

No. 45
- Position: Tackle

Personal information
- Born: September 13, 1922; Chicago, Illinois, U.S.
- Died: July 1, 1984 (aged 61); Chicago, Illinois, U.S.
- Listed height: 6 ft 0 in (1.83 m)
- Listed weight: 230 lb (104 kg)

Career information
- High school: Mount Carmel (Chicago)
- College: Notre Dame (1942–1943, 1946–1947)
- NFL draft: 1945: 7th round, 55th overall pick

Career history
- Chicago Rockets / Hornets (1948–1949)

Awards and highlights
- 3× National champion (1943, 1946, 1947); First-team All-American (1947)

Career AAFC statistics
- Games played: 26
- Games started: 15
- Stats at Pro Football Reference
- College Football Hall of Fame

Zygmont "Ziggy" Peter Czarobski (September 13, 1922 – July 1, 1984) was an American professional football player. He played at the tackle position for the Notre Dame Fighting Irish (1942–1943; 1946–1947) and in the National Football League (NFL) for the Chicago Rockets/Hornets (1948–1949). He was inducted into the College Football Hall of Fame in 1977.

Czarobski was born on the South Side of Chicago in 1922 and attended Mount Carmel High School. He began his college football career playing at the tackle position for the University of Notre Dame from 1942 to 1943, but he then missed the 1944 and 1945 seasons due to military service. He returned to Notre Dame for the 1946 to 1947 seasons. At the end of the 1947 season, Czarobski was selected as a first-team All-American by the Newspaper Enterprise Association (NEA) and the International News Service (INS). He was selected as a second-team All-American by the Associated Press and a third-team All-American by the United Press.

Czarobski also played professional football in the NFL for the Chicago Rockets/Hornets (1948–1949). He appeared in a total of 26 games in the NFL.

Czaraobski was inducted into the College Football Hall of Fame in 1977. He was also inducted into the National Polish-American Sports Hall of Fame in 1984. He died in 1984 at age 61.
