= Pat Boland =

American football coach

Personal information
- Born: October 12, 1906; Duluth, Minnesota, U.S.
- Died: July 2, 1971 (aged 64); Duluth, Minnesota, U.S.

Career information
- College: Minnesota

Career history
- Minnesota (1932) Freshmen coach; Iowa (1937–1942) Line coach; Chicago Rockets (1946) Line coach; Chicago Rockets (1946) Interim head coach

Awards and highlights
- Second-team All-Big Ten (1931)

Head coaching record
- Regular season: 2–3–1 (.417)
- Coaching profile at Pro Football Reference

Patrick Henry Boland (October 12, 1906 – July 2, 1971) was a head coach in the AAFC for one season in 1946. He was the interim coach for the Chicago Rockets. He was also a line coach at Iowa.

== Early life ==
Boland was born on October 12, 1906, in Duluth, Minnesota. He went to college at Minnesota.

== College coaching career ==
Boland was a freshman coach at Minnesota in 1932. In 1937 he became a line coach for the Iowa Hawkeyes. He was the coach there from 1937 to 1942.

== Professional coaching career ==
In 1946, Boland became the line coach for the Chicago Rockets of the AAFC. He became the interim coach a few weeks later. As a coach he had a 2–3–1 record.

== Later life ==
Boland later became a recruiter for the University of Iowa and the University of Miami. He died at 64 in 1971.
