= Vince Pacewic =

American football player (1920–1990)

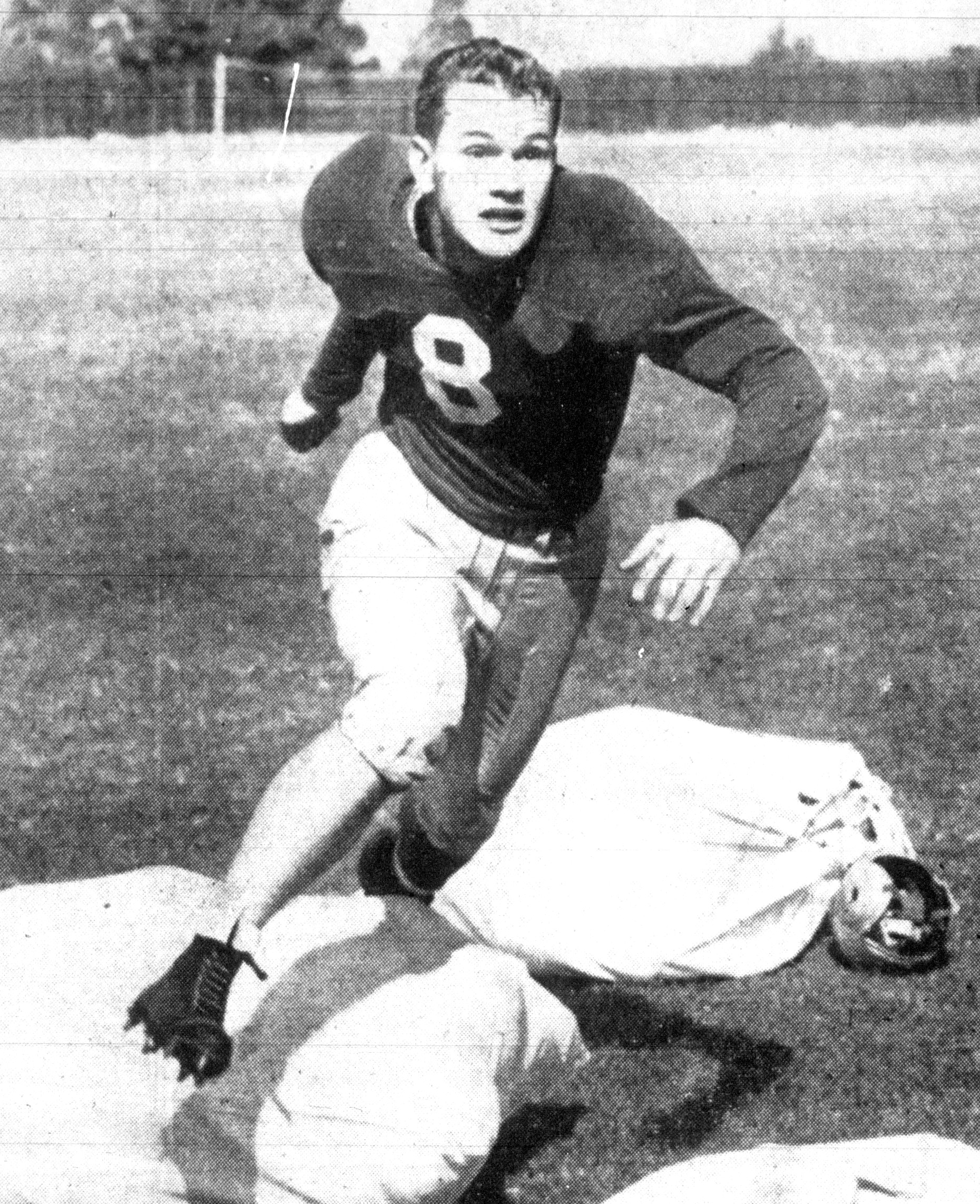
- Pacewic, circa 1942

No. 12, 34
- Position: Halfback

Personal information
- Born: May 28, 1920; Collinsville, Illinois, U.S.
- Died: April 1, 1990 (aged 69); Los Angeles, California, U.S.
- Listed height: 6 ft 1 in (1.85 m)
- Listed weight: 205 lb (93 kg)

Career information
- College: Loyola of Los Angeles (1940–1942); San Francisco (1946)
- NFL draft: 1943: 27th round, 260th overall pick

Career history
- Los Angeles Rams (1947)*; Washington Redskins (1947)
- * Offseason or practice squad member only

Awards and highlights
- First-team Little All-American (1942); Second-team All-PCC (1942)

Career NFL statistics
- Receptions: 5
- Receiving yards: 42
- Stats at Pro Football Reference

Vincent Charles Pacewic (May 28, 1920 – April 1, 1990) was an American professional football halfback in the National Football League (NFL) for the Washington Redskins. He played college football at Loyola University of Los Angeles and University of San Francisco. He was drafted in the 27th round of the 1943 NFL draft.

== College football and military service ==
Pacewic played on the Lions' freshman team during his first year at Loyola of Los Angeles in 1940, and made the full roster in the 1941 and 1942 seasons. He was then drafted in the 27th round of the 1943 NFL draft by the Washington Redskins, but did not sign with the team as he served in the United States Army during World War II. Following the end of the war, he returned to college football in 1946. Now enrolled at the University of San Francisco, Pacewic played one season with the San Francisco Dons before going pro in 1947.

== Professional football ==
=== Los Angeles Rams ===
In 1947, Pacewic signed with the team that drafted him four years prior, the Washington Redskins. However, the Redskins soon traded him to the Los Angeles Rams, with the stipulation that if the Rams opted to keep him, the team had to give up one of their own players to Washington. Ultimately, the Rams chose not to keep Pacewic on the roster, and traded him back to the Redskins on September 6, 1947.

=== Washington Redskins ===
Appearing in only two games, Pacewic made 5 receptions for 42 yards, and never rushed once, despite his position being listed as running back.

In the team's October 26 game against the Chicago Bears, Pacewic had one of his vertebrae knocked out of place, causing temporary partial paralysis. He seemed to recover from the paralysis quickly and was able to leave Griffith Stadium on his own, and it was initially thought that he would be able to return for the following week. However, the injury proved to be season-ending, as he was ruled out for several more games following the injury.

The Redskins put him on the trade bloc in mid-November 1947, and he never played another down of professional football.

== Later life and death ==
Pacewic died in Los Angeles on April 1, 1990, at the age of 69 years old.
