= Jim Brutz =

American football player (1919–2000)

- Jim Brutz in 1940

Profile
- Position: Tackle

Personal information
- Born: February 12, 1919; Niles, Ohio
- Died: November 5, 2000 (aged 81); Warren, Ohio
- Listed height: 6 ft 0 in (1.83 m)
- Listed weight: 230 lb (104 kg)

Career information
- College: Notre Dame

Career history
- Chicago Rockets (1946, 1948)
- Stats at Pro Football Reference

James Charles Brutz (February 12, 1919 – November 5, 2000) was an American football tackle.

Brutz was born in Niles, Ohio. He began attending Niles High School but was recruited to play football at Warren G. Harding High School in Warren, Ohio. He played college football for Notre Dame from 1939 to 1941. He was selected as the most valuable player on the undefeated 1941 Notre Dame Fighting Irish football team.

After the United States entry into World War II, Brutz enlisted in the United States Navy. He played on Navy football teams, served in the Pacific Theater, and attained the rank of lieutenant commander.

After the war, he played professional football in the All-America Football Conference for the Chicago Rockets in 1946 and 1948. He appeared in 23 games, 11 as a starter.

After retiring from football, Brutz worked as a teacher and later as a real estate broker in Warren, Ohio. He died in 2000 at Warren.
