= Ernie Lewis =

American football player (1924–1995)

No. 73, 71, 64
- Positions: Fullback, punter, linebacker

Personal information
- Born: November 20, 1924; Boonville, Missouri, U.S.
- Died: May 28, 1995 (aged 70); Denver, Colorado, U.S.
- Listed height: 6 ft 1 in (1.85 m)
- Listed weight: 211 lb (96 kg)

Career information
- High school: Swink (Swink, Colorado)
- College: Colorado (1942)
- NFL draft: 1946: 9th round, 77th overall pick

Career history
- Chicago Rockets / Hornets (1946–1949)

Awards and highlights
- AAFC punting yards leader (1947)

Career AAFC statistics
- Punts: 191
- Punting yards: 7,994
- Punting average: 41.9
- Rushing yards: 308
- Rushing average: 3.3
- Rushing touchdowns: 2
- Stats at Pro Football Reference

Ernest Clayton Lewis (November 20, 1924 – May 28, 1995) was an American professional football fullback and punter who played for four seasons in the All-America Football Conference (AAFC) for the Chicago Rockets / Hornets from 1946 to 1949. He was drafted by the Philadelphia Eagles in the ninth round (77th overall) of the 1946 NFL draft, but chose to play in the AAFC instead. He played college football for the Colorado Buffaloes.

Lewis was also an All-American thrower for the Colorado Buffaloes track and field team, finishing 5th in the discus throw at the 1943 NCAA Track and Field Championships.
