= Darrell Tully =

American football player and coach (1917–1997)

No. 4
- Position: Back

Personal information
- Born: December 14, 1917; Henryetta, Oklahoma, U.S.
- Died: February 4, 1997 (aged 79); Harris County, Texas, U.S.
- Listed height: 6 ft 1 in (1.85 m)
- Listed weight: 200 lb (91 kg)

Career information
- High school: Eastland (Eastland, Texas)
- College: East Texas State
- NFL draft: 1939: 7th round, 57th overall pick

Career history
- Detroit Lions (1939)

Awards and highlights
- First-team Little All-American (1938)

Career NFL statistics
- Passing attempts: 75
- Passing completions: 20
- Completion percentage: 26.7%
- TD–INT: 2–13
- Passing yards: 356
- Passer rating: 16.2
- Stats at Pro Football Reference

Darrell Dean Tully (December 14, 1917 – February 4, 1997) was an American professional football player and coach. He played college football at East Texas. A seventh round selection in the 1939 NFL draft, Tully played one season for the Detroit Lions. Tully was head football coach and athletic director at Spring Branch High School from 1957 until 1964. In 1964 Tully became full-time athletic director for the Spring Branch Independent School District and remained in that capacity until his retirement in 1978. The 15,000-capacity Darrell Tully Stadium in Houston, Texas is named in his honor.

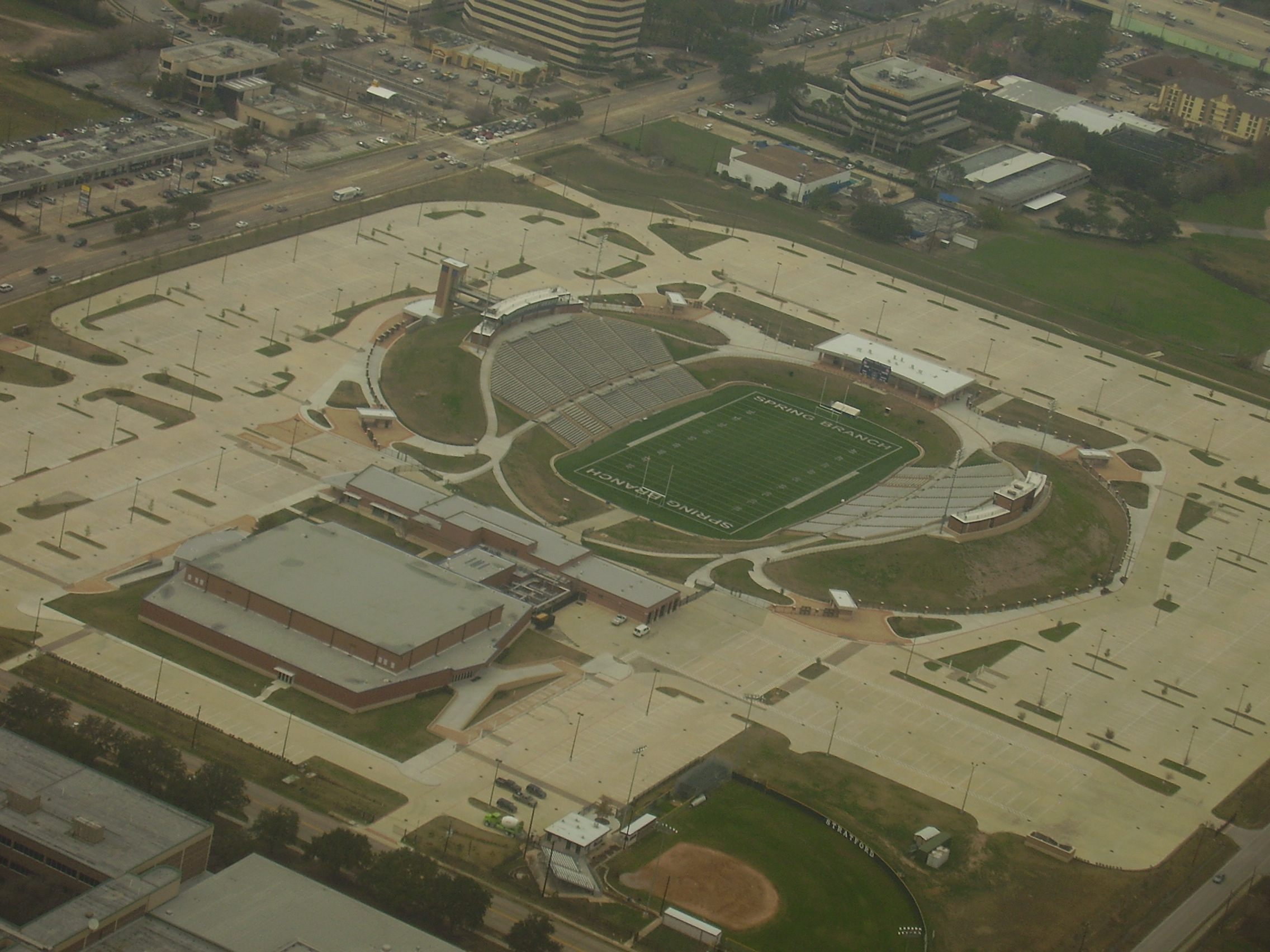
Tully Stadium
