= Larry Visnic =

American football player (1919–1994)

No. 31
- Positions: Guard, linebacker, back

Personal information
- Born: April 7, 1919; Jacobsburg, Ohio, U.S.
- Died: June 27, 1994 (aged 75)
- Listed height: 5 ft 11 in (1.80 m)
- Listed weight: 190 lb (86 kg)

Career information
- High school: Belmont (Belmont, North Carolina)
- College: St. Benedict's (1940–1942)
- NFL draft: 1943: 8th round, 66th overall pick

Career history
- New York Giants (1943–1945)

Awards and highlights
- Second-team Little All-American (1942)

Career NFL statistics
- Games played: 22
- Games started: 4
- Interceptions: 3
- Stats at Pro Football Reference

Charles Lawrence Visnic (April 7, 1919 – June 27, 1994) was an American professional football guard, linebacker, and blocking back who played college football for St. Benedict's College (now known as Benedictine College) in Atchison, Kansas from 1940 to 1942 and professionally in the National Football League (NFL) for the New York Giants from 1943 to 1945. He appeared in 24 NFL games.

== Early life ==
Visnic was born in 1918 in Jacobsburg, Ohio, and attended St. John's High School in Ohio and Belmont High School in North Carolina. He played college football at St. Benedict's College in Atchison, Kansas from 1940 to 1942. He was selected by the Associated Press as a second-team guard on the 1942 Little All-America football team. He was also selected as a first team player on the 1940 and 1942 All Central Conference football teams.

== Professional football ==
Visnic was drafted by the New York Giants in the eighth round (66th overall pick) of the 1943 NFL draft. He played for the Giants for three seasons from 1943 to 1945, appearing as a guard in a total of 24 games, four of them as a starter. He had three interceptions for the Giants, one of which he returned for 41 yards in 1944.

== Later life ==
Visnic died in 1994 at age 75.
