= Frank Patrick (American football, born 1915) =

American football player and coach (1915–1992)

No. 27, 24, 38
- Positions: Blocking back, fullback

Personal information
- Born: October 3, 1915; East Chicago, Indiana, U.S.
- Died: September 26, 1992 (aged 76); State College, Pennsylvania, U.S.
- Listed height: 5 ft 11 in (1.80 m)
- Listed weight: 190 lb (86 kg)

Career information
- High school: Roosevelt (East Chicago)
- College: Pittsburgh (1934–1937)
- NFL draft: 1938: 3rd round, 20th overall pick

Career history

Playing
- Chicago Cardinals (1938–1939); Boston Bears (1940); Milwaukee Chiefs (1941); Worcester Panthers (1942)

Coaching
- Puget Sound (1946–1948) Head coach; Pittsburgh Steelers (1948) Backfield; Penn State (1949–1973) Assistant

Awards and highlights
- 2× National champion (1936, 1937)

Career NFL statistics
- Games played: 15
- Passing yards: 291
- Total touchdowns: 3
- Stats at Pro Football Reference

Frank W. Patrick (October 3, 1915 – September 26, 1992) was an American professional football player who played two seasons with the Chicago Cardinals of the National Football League (NFL). He was selected by the Cardinals in the third round of the 1938 NFL draft after playing college football at the University of Pittsburgh.

== Early life and college ==
Frank W. Patrick was born on October 3, 1915, in East Chicago, Indiana. He attended Roosevelt High School in East Chicago.

He was a member of the Pittsburgh Panthers from 1934 to 1937 and a three-year letterman from 1935 to 1937. His senior year in 1937, he rushed 71 times for 248 yards and eight touchdowns while also completing five of 13 passes (38.5%) for 74 yards. The 1936 Panthers won the Rose Bowl and were selected national champion by the contemporary Boand math system and retroactively years later by the Football Researchers poll and Houlgate math system. The 1937 Panthers were consensus national champions.

== Professional career ==
Patrick was selected by the Chicago Cardinals in the third round, with the 20th overall pick, of the 1938 NFL draft. He signed with the team on September 8, 1938. He played in seven games, starting five, for the Cardinals during his rookie year in 1938, rushing once for one yard, throwing an incomplete pass, and catching a 21-yard touchdown. He also converted one of four field goals and eight of eight extra points that season. Patrick appeared in eight games, starting five, during his second season with the Cardinals in 1939, recording 22 completions on 79 passing attempts (27.8%) for 291 yards, one touchdown, and 13 interceptions while also rushing 30 times for 84 yards and one touchdown. He punted 16 times for 637 yards and converted one of one extra points that year as well. Patrick was released by the Cardinals on September 3, 1940.

Patrick played in five games, starting three, for the Boston Bears of the American Football League (AFL) in 1940, scoring one passing touchdown, one receiving touchdown, and one extra point.

Patrick played in three games, starting two, for the AFL's Milwaukee Chiefs in 1941.

He was a member of the Worcester Panthers in 1942.

== Coaching career ==
Patrick was head coach of the Puget Sound Loggers from 1946 to 1948. He was a backfield coach for the Pittsburgh Steelers in 1948. He was also an assistant coach for the Penn State Nittany Lions from 1949 to 1973.

== Personal life ==
Patrick served in the United States Navy.

He died on September 26, 1992, in State College, Pennsylvania.
