= Donald Jackson =

Donald Jackson may refer to:

- Donald Jackson (archer) (1932–2009), Canadian Olympic archer
- Donald Jackson (figure skater) (born 1940), Canadian figure skater
- Donald Jackson (calligrapher) (born 1938), English calligrapher
- Don Jackson (American football) (born 1993), American football running back
- Donald deAvila Jackson (1920–1968), American psychiatrist
- Donald Dean Jackson (1919–1987), American journalist and historian
- Donald L. Jackson (1910–1981), U.S. Representative from California
- Donald G. Jackson (1943–2003), American filmmaker
- Don Jackson (ice hockey) (born 1956), retired ice hockey player
- Don Jackson (radio personality) (died 2020), Canadian radio personality
- Donald Jackson (Canadian politician) (born 1930), member of the Legislative Assembly of Ontario
