= Randy Fasani =

American football player (born 1978)

No. 12
- Position: Quarterback

Personal information
- Born: September 18, 1978 (age 48); Sacramento, California, U.S.
- Listed height: 6 ft 3 in (1.91 m)
- Listed weight: 234 lb (106 kg)

Career information
- High school: Del Oro (Loomis, California)
- College: Stanford
- NFL draft: 2002: 5th round, 137th overall pick

Career history
- Carolina Panthers (2002); Buffalo Bills (2003)*
- * Offseason or practice squad member only

Career NFL statistics
- Passing attempts: 44
- Passing completions: 15
- Completion percentage: 34.1%
- TD–INT: 0–4
- Passing yards: 171
- Passer rating: 8.8
- Stats at Pro Football Reference

Randy Fasani (born September 18, 1978) is an American former professional football player who was a quarterback for the Carolina Panthers of the National Football League (NFL). He played college football for the Stanford Cardinal.

== Early life ==
Fasani started his football days at Del Oro High School in Loomis, California. He finished his high school career with 5,299 passing yards and 53 touchdowns, while rushing for 654 yards and 16 touchdowns. Fasani was lauded by many as the top quarterback and #1 recruit in the nation, including Parade and USA Today. He was named to several All-America teams.

== College career ==
Fasani played college football at Stanford University, where he was the starting quarterback his last two years. After redshirting as a true freshman, he played as a goal-line quarterback and tight end the next season. During the 1999 season, he played inside linebacker as well as quarterback, and made honorable mention on the Academic All-Pac-10 team. He started eight games his junior year, and finished the season with 1,400 passing yards, eleven touchdowns, and six interceptions. He also rushed for 123 yards and two touchdowns. He finished his college career with an honorable mention on the All-Pac 10 team, passing for 1,479 yards, 13 touchdowns and four interceptions.

== Professional career ==
Fasani was selected in the fifth round of the 2002 NFL draft by the Carolina Panthers. He played in four games, going 15–44, 171 yards, 0 TDs and 4 INTs, while rushing for 95 yards. He made his first and only NFL start on October 27 against the Tampa Bay Buccaneers, going 5-18 for 47 yards, no touchdowns, and three interceptions. His performance resulted in the dubious passer rating of 0.0. Fasani was waived by the Panthers on August 26, 2003.

Fasani was signed to the practice squad of the Buffalo Bills on October 18, 2003. He was released on December 2, 2003.

== After football ==
Following football, Fasani worked as a police officer in Visalia, California and Roseville, California. He was the varsity head coach for the Ripon Christian High School football team in Ripon, California. Since 2009, he has worked as a field sales representative for Sierra Gold Nurseries. In 2020, he returned to the Del Oro High School football staff as the quarterbacks coach.
