= Hugh McCullough =

American football player (1916–1999)

No. 25, 33, 19
- Position: Halfback

Personal information
- Born: May 18, 1916; Anadarko, Oklahoma, U.S.
- Died: February 11, 1999 (aged 82)
- Listed height: 6 ft 0 in (1.83 m)
- Listed weight: 185 lb (84 kg)

Career information
- High school: Central (Oklahoma City, Oklahoma)
- College: Oklahoma (1935-1938)
- NFL draft: 1939: 4th round, 26th overall pick

Career history
- Pittsburgh Pirates (1939); Chicago Cardinals (1940–1941); Philadelphia Eagles-Pittsburgh Steelers (1943); Boston Yanks (1945)

Awards and highlights
- Third-team All-American (1938); First-team All-Big Six (1938)

Career NFL statistics
- Passing attempts: 254
- Passing completions: 87
- Completion percentage: 34.4%
- TD–INT: 6–41
- Passing yards: 1,105
- Passer rating: 17
- Rushing yards: 397
- Rushing touchdowns: 4
- Stats at Pro Football Reference

Hugh Warner McCullough (May 18, 1916 – February 11, 1999) was an American professional football player who played five seasons in the National Football League (NFL). During his time in the NFL, McCullough played for the Pittsburgh Pirates (later renamed the Pittsburgh Steelers in 1940), Chicago Cardinals, Philadelphia-Pittsburgh Steagles and the Boston Yanks.

McCullough was drafted from the University of Oklahoma by Pittsburgh in the fourth round of the 1939 NFL draft, as selection #26.
