= Jim Pearcy =

American football player (1918–2005)

- Pearcy in 1948

No. 30
- Position: Guard

Personal information
- Born: July 26, 1918; Harrisville, West Virginia, U.S.
- Died: March 15, 2005 (aged 86); Hendersonville, North Carolina, U.S.
- Listed height: 5 ft 11 in (1.80 m)
- Listed weight: 210 lb (95 kg)

Career information
- College: Marshall

Career history
- Chicago Rockets (1946–1948); Chicago Hornets (1949)
- Stats at Pro Football Reference

James Wheeler Pearcy (July 26, 1918 – March 15, 2005) was an American football guard.

Pearcy was born in Harrisville, West Virginia, and attended Victory High School in Clarksburg, West Virginia. He played college football for Marshall from 1939 to 1941.

Pearcy served in the Marine Corps during World War II, served in the Pacific Theater, and received a Purple Heart, Bronze, and Silver Star. He was one of three Marines in his platoon to survive the Battle of Iwo Jima.

He played professional football in the All-America Football Conference for the Chicago Rockets from 1946 to 1948 and for the Chicago Hornets in 1949. He appeared in 49 games, 30 as a starter.

Pearcy was inducted into the Marshall Athletics Hall of Fame in 1984. He died in Hendersonville, North Carolina, in 2005.
