= Jesse Freitas Sr. =

American football player (1921–2020)

Jesse Freitas
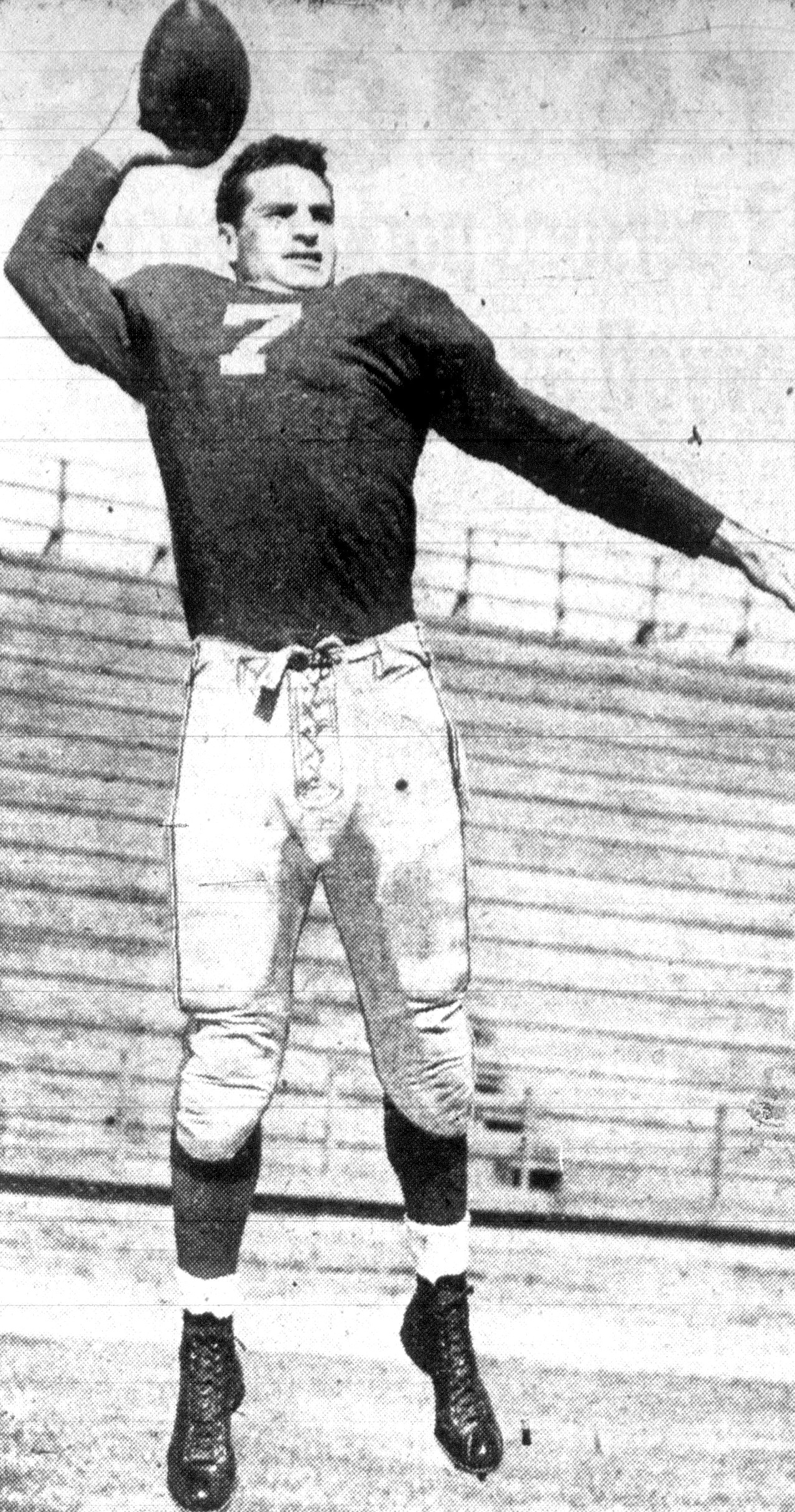
- Freitas Sr., c. 1942

No. 62, 60, 87
- Position: Quarterback

Personal information
- Born: February 7, 1921; Red Bluff, California, U.S.
- Died: May 18, 2020 (aged 99); San Diego, California, U.S.
- Listed height: 5 ft 10 in (1.78 m)
- Listed weight: 170 lb (77 kg)

Career information
- High school: Red Bluff
- College: Santa Clara (1940-1942)
- NFL draft: 1944: 7th round, 63rd overall pick

Career history

Playing
- San Francisco 49ers (1946-1947); Chicago Rockets (1948); Buffalo Bills (1949)

Coaching
- Junípero Serra HS (CA) (1950–1954) Head coach; San Mateo (1955–1957) Head coach; Junípero Serra HS (CA) (1960–1961) Head coach; Sunnyvale HS (CA) (1962–1964) Assistant coach; Junípero Serra HS (CA) (1965–1974) Head coach

Awards and highlights
- Third-team All-American (1942); First-team All-PCC (1942)

Career AAFC statistics
- Passing attempts: 253
- Passing completions: 123
- Completion percentage: 48.6%
- TD–INT: 21–27
- Passing yards: 1,884
- Passer rating: 61.7
- Stats at Pro Football Reference

Head coaching record
- Career: College: 5–23 (.179)

Jesse Freitas (February 7, 1921 – May 18, 2020) was an American professional football player who was a quarterback in the All-America Football Conference (AAFC). He played for the San Francisco 49ers, Chicago Rockets and Buffalo Bills His son, Jesse Jr., was also a quarterback in the National Football League (NFL).

After his playing career ended, Freitas became a coach. In 1950, he was hired as the head football coach at Junípero Serra High School in San Mateo, California. Freitas was appointed head football coach at the College of San Mateo in 1955, succeeding Duane Whitehead. He was also the head baseball coach at San Mateo before he was fired in March 1958. Freitas returned to Junípero Serra as head football coach in 1960. After two seasons, he left Serra in 1962 to become an assistant football coach at Sunnyvale High School in Sunnyvale, California. He went back to Serra for a third stint as head football coach in 1965, continuing through the 1974 season. He compiled an overall record of 107–46–3 in 17 seasons at Serra.

Freitas died of cancer, at age 99, on May 18, 2020, in San Diego.

== Head coaching record ==
=== Junior college football ===
Year	Team	Overall	Conference	Standing	Bowl/playoffs
San Mateo Bulldogs (Big Eight Conference) (1955–1957)
1955	San Mateo	2–7	1–6	8th	
1956	San Mateo	1–8	1–6	T–6th	
1957	San Mateo	2–7	1–6	T–7th	
San Mateo:		5–23	3–18		
Total:		5–23			
