= Jackie Fellows =

American gridiron football player (1922–1993)

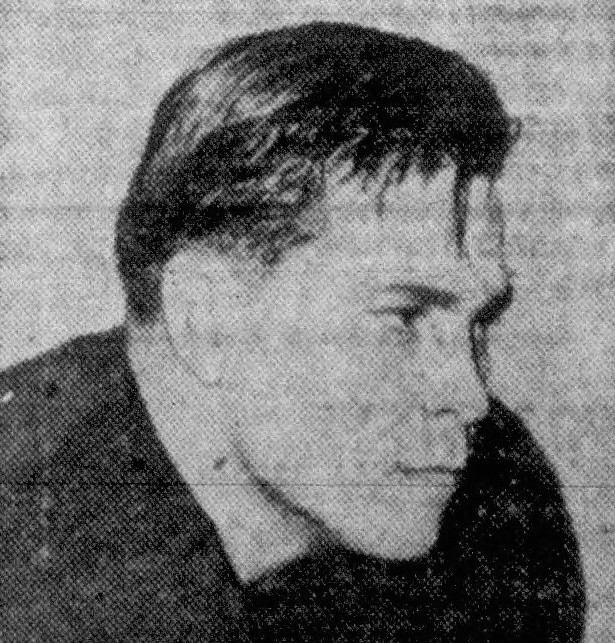
- Fellows, c. 1942

Profile
- Position: Halfback

Personal information
- Born: January 8, 1922; Los Angeles, California, U.S.
- Died: July 24, 1993 (aged 71); Jerome, Idaho, U.S.
- Listed height: 5 ft 6 in (1.68 m)
- Listed weight: 165 lb (75 kg)

Career information
- College: Fresno State
- NFL draft: 1944: 6th round, 50th overall pick

Career history
- Ottawa Rough Riders (1947)

Awards and highlights
- First-team All-American (1942)

Jack Byron "Jackie" Fellows (January 8, 1922 – July 24, 1993) was an American football player. He played college football for Los Angeles City College, was selected to the Little All-American team and led the team to the national junior college football championship. He transferred to California State University, Fresno and played for the Fresno State Bulldogs football team. During the 1942 college football season, Fellows led Fresno State to a 9–1 record, rushed for 599 yards and completed 82 of 195 passes for 1,314 yards. He also broke Davey O'Brien's single-season record by throwing 23 touchdown passes. He was selected by both Look magazine and Maxwell Stiles as a first-team halfback on the 1942 College Football All-America Team. After graduating from college, Fellows was draft in the sixth round of the 1944 NFL draft by the Washington Redskins, but did not play in the National Football League (NFL). In 1947, Fellows played for the Ottawa Rough Riders of the Canadian Football League (CFL). In 1984, Fellows was inducted into the Fresno County Athletic Hall of Fame.
