= Chicago Rockets =

American football team

General information
- Founded: 1946
- Folded: 1949
- Stadium: Soldier Field
- Headquartered: Chicago, United States
- Colors: (1946) (1947) (1948) (1949)

League / conference affiliations
- All-America Football Conference; Western Division

The Chicago Rockets were an American football team that played in the All-America Football Conference (AAFC) from 1946 to 1949. During the 1949 season, the team was known as the Chicago Hornets. Unlike the Cleveland Browns, San Francisco 49ers, and Baltimore Colts, the franchise did not join the National Football League (NFL) prior to the 1950 season.

The Chicago Rockets franchise was owned by Chicago trucking executive John L. "Jack" Keeshin, president of the National Jockey Club that owned and operated Sportsman's Park race track in Cicero, Illinois. He originally attempted to purchase the Chicago White Sox from the Comiskey family but was turned down. Chicago Tribune sports editor Arch Ward suggested starting a pro football team in the AAFC. In a market where the NFL Chicago Bears and Chicago Cardinals were already well established, Keeshin stood little chance of success. He did cause a stir by attempting to sign Chicago Bears stars Sid Luckman, George McAfee and Hugh Gallarneau without success.

The Rockets played their home games at Soldier Field.

== Season records ==
Season records
Season	W	L	T	Finish	Playoff results
Chicago Rockets
1946	5	6	3	4th AAFC West	--
1947	1	13	0	4th AAFC West	--
1948	1	13	0	4th AAFC West	--
Chicago Hornets
1949	4	8	0	6th AAFC	--
Totals	11	40	3		
