= Deaths in May 2006 =

The following is a list of notable deaths in May 2006.

Entries for each day are listed alphabetically by surname. A typical entry lists information in the following sequence:

- Name, age, country of citizenship at birth, subsequent country of citizenship (if applicable), reason for notability, cause of death (if known), and reference.

== May 2006 ==
=== 1 ===
- Jay Presson Allen, 84, American screenwriter, stroke.
- Wilfrid Butt, 83, English biochemist and reproductive endocrinologist.
- Ed Casey, 73, Australian politician, former Queensland Labor Party leader, stroke.
- George Haines, 82, American Olympic swimming coach, complications from a stroke.
- Betsy Jones-Moreland, 76, American actress, cancer.
- Rob Lacey, 43, British stage actor and award-winning Christian author, bladder cancer.
- Rauno Lehtinen, 74, Finnish composer.
- Bruce Peterson, 72, American test pilot and engineer, inspiration for The Six Million Dollar Man.
- Raúl Francisco Primatesta, 87, Argentine retired Cardinal Archbishop of Córdoba, Argentina.
- Theo Terlingen, 66, Dutch Olympic field hockey player (1960, 1964, 1968).

=== 2 ===
- Al Asuncion, 76, Filipino Olympic boxer (1952).
- Clive Burgess, 55, Welsh rugby union player.
- Joseph Lewis Clark, 57, American convicted murderer, executed in Ohio.
- Boyd Coffie, 68, American baseball player and manager, cancer.
- Rosita Fernández, 88, American singer.
- Luigi Griffanti, 89, Italian footballer, goalkeeper of ACF Fiorentina in the 1940s.
- Kalle Haapasalmi, 79, Finnish Olympic wrestler (1952).
- Kaare Hammer, 87, Norwegian Olympic racewalker (1948, 1952).
- Louis Rukeyser, 73, American business and economics expert, multiple myeloma.
- Juan Ramón Salgado, 45, Honduran congressional deputy, gunshot wounds.
- Sammy Steamboat, 71, American professional wrestler, complications from Alzheimer's disease.

=== 3 ===
- Karel Appel, 85, Dutch COBRA painter.
- Boris Kuznetsov, 59, Soviet Russian boxer and Olympian (1972).
- Franco Lavoratori, 65, Italian water polo player and Olympian (1960, 1964, 1968, 1972).
- Pramod Mahajan, 56, Indian politician, general secretary of Bharatiya Janata Party, gunshot wounds.
- Howard Thomas Markey, 85, American federal judge and U.S. Air Force major general, first chief judge of the United States Court of Appeals for the Federal Circuit.
- Paul Penson, 74, American baseball player (Philadelphia Phillies).
- Earl Woods, 74, American lieutenant colonel and golfing coach (Tiger Woods), prostate cancer.

=== 4 ===
- Alejandra Boero, 88, Argentine theater actress, director and teacher, pulmonary hypertension.
- Jim Delsing, 80, American baseball player (Detroit Tigers, St. Louis Browns, New York Yankees), cancer.
- Arthur B. Metzner, 79, Canadian chemical engineer.
- Ken Stofer, 86, American football player (Cornell Big Red, Buffalo Bisons).
- Michael Taliferro, 45, American actor (Life, The Replacements) and football player (BC Lions), stroke.

=== 5 ===
- Zoe Dumitrescu-Bușulenga, 85, Romanian comparatist and essayist.
- Naushad, 86, Indian musician.
- George Roche III, 70, American former president of Hillsdale College, probable heart attack.
- Atıf Yılmaz, 80, Turkish film director, screenwriter and producer, cancer.

=== 6 ===
- Lillian Asplund, 99, last American survivor of the Titanic sinking, died in sleep.
- Konstantin Beskov, 85, Soviet Russian footballer, manager, and Olympian (1952).
- Donald Bland, 74, British swimmer and Olympian (1948).
- Ruth Bachhuber Doyle, 89, American politician and educator.
- Leo Katkaveck, 83, American basketball player (NC State Wolfpack, Washington Capitols).
- Shigeru Kayano, 79, Japanese Ainu activist.
- Grant McLennan, 48, Australian lead singer of The Go-Betweens, suspected heart attack.
- Sir Anthony Morton, 82, British admiral.
- František Peřina, 95, Czechoslovak fighter pilot who served in the British Royal Air Force during World War II.
- Tikkavarapu Pattabhirama Reddy, 87, Indian moviemaker, complications from a prolonged illness.
- Lorne Saxberg, 48, Canadian television journalist, Canadian Broadcasting Corporation (CBC) broadcaster.
- Rose Thering, 85, American Roman Catholic nun and professor at Seton Hall University.

=== 7 ===
- Steve Bender, 59, German singer and member of Dschinghis Khan, lung cancer.
- Duncan Inglis Cameron, 78, Scottish university administrator.
- Richard Carleton, 62, Australian television journalist (60 Minutes), heart attack.
- Joan C. Edwards, 87, American philanthropist, liver cancer.
- Svend Hansen, 83, Danish footballer.
- Jeff James, 64, American baseball player (Philadelphia Phillies).
- Alfréd Jindra, 76, Czech Olympic canoeist (1952).
- Emmanuel Legaspi, 37, Filipino-American soldier and Olympic boxer (1988).
- Stella Sigcau, 69, South African Public Works Minister, heart-related problems.
- Jack Simon, Baron Simon of Glaisdale, 95, United Kingdom minister and Lord of Appeal in Ordinary.
- Machiko Soga, 68, Japanese actress (Super Sentai, Power Rangers, Metal Hero), pancreatic cancer.

=== 8 ===
- Lovana Jones, 68, American Assistant Majority Leader in the Illinois House of Representatives, represented the 26th District since 1987, undisclosed causes.
- John Kimbrough, 87, American football player (College Hall of Fame with Texas A&M) and state legislator, pneumonia.
- Jean Mitchell, 93, British Olympic sailor (1960).
- Patrick Ntsoelengoe, 50, South African soccer player (Minnesota Kicks, Kaizer Chiefs).
- Gregorio Rojo, 86, Spanish Olympic long-distance runner (1948).
- Barbara Schwartz, 58, American painter.

=== 9 ===
- Adrian Bennett, 73, Australian politician, MHR for Division of Swan (1969–1975).
- Corey Engen, 90, Norwegian-born American Olympic skier (1948), complications from pneumonia.
- Jerzy Ficowski, 81, Polish poet, writer and translator.
- Alfredo Del Francia, 61, Italian Olympic fencer (1968, 1972).
- Pietro Garinei, 87, Italian playwright and lyricist.
- Édouard Jaguer, French poet and art critic.
- Per Knudsen, 75, Norwegian footballer.
- William Lindsay, 101, American baseball player.
- Gheorghe Sencovici, 60, Romanian Olympic sports shooter (1968).
- David Tsimakuridze, 81, Soviet Georgian Olympic wrestler (1952).
- Betty Wagoner, 75, American baseball player.
- Tony Ward, 82, Australian actor and journalist, cancer.

=== 10 ===
- Val Guest, 94, British screenwriter and film director (The Quatermass Xperiment, Casino Royale).
- Marie Hartley, 100, British author and illustrator.
- John Hicks, 64, American jazz pianist/composer.
- James Keogh, 89, American former executive editor of Time and speechwriter for US President Richard Nixon.
- Georgy Korniyenko, 81, Russian diplomat and deputy to Foreign Minister Andrei Gromyko.
- A. M. Rosenthal, 84, Canadian-born Executive Editor of The New York Times for 17 years, stroke.
- Soraya, 37, Colombian-American songwriter, guitarist, arranger, record producer, and singer, breast cancer.
- Roderick Tuck, 71, British Olympic skier (1964).
- Alexander Zinoviev, 83, Russian logician, sociologist and writer, brain cancer.

=== 11 ===
- Yossi Banai, 74, Israeli singer and actor, cancer.
- James Burke, 70, American wrestler and Olympian (1964).
- Sir Frank Mills, 82, British diplomat, High Commissioner to Ghana and Bangladesh.
- Byron Morrow, 94, American TV and film character actor.
- Michael O'Leary, 70, Irish politician and barrister, former leader of the Irish Labour Party, drowned in a swimming pool.
- Floyd Patterson, 71, American former boxing heavyweight champion and Olympian (1952), Alzheimer's disease and prostate cancer.
- Ferdinando Tacconi, 83, Italian comics artist.
- Frankie Thomas, 85, American actor (Tom Corbett, Space Cadet), stroke.

=== 12 ===
- Ted Berkman, 92, American author, scriptwriter (Bedtime for Bonzo).
- Bob Dougherty, 74, American football player (Los Angeles Rams, Pittsburgh Steelers, Oakland Raiders).
- Jack Downey, 84, Australian Olympic sailor (1956, 1960).
- Valentina Kovpan, 56, Soviet Ukrainian Olympic archer (1976).
- Hussein Maziq, 88, Libyan politician, former prime minister & foreign minister of Libya.
- Sonny Montgomery, 85, American politician, former U.S. representative from Mississippi.
- Arthur Porges, 90, American science fiction and fantasy writer.
- Bunkichi Sawada, 85, Japanese pole vaulter and Olympian (1952).

=== 13 ===
- Joan Diener, 76, American actress (Man of La Mancha), complications from cancer.
- Rick Farley, 53, Australian National Farmers' Federation Chief Executive for eight years.
- Ryan Francis, 19, American college basketball player, freshman point guard for the University of Southern California basketball team, homicide.
- Fernando Inchauste, 75, Bolivian Olympic canoeist and sports shooter (1964, 1968, 1972).
- Jaroslav Pelikan, 82, American historian of Christianity, winner of the Kluge Prize in the Human Sciences, lung cancer.
- Östen Sjöstrand, 80, Swedish poet, translator and member of the Swedish Academy.
- Peter Viereck, 89, American historian and Pulitzer Prize-winning poet.
- Johnnie Wilder Jr., 56, American musician (Heatwave).

=== 14 ===
- Lew Anderson, 84, American bandleader, played Clarabell the Clown on The Howdy Doody Show, prostate cancer.
- Jackie Botten, 67, South African international test cricketer, complications after colon operations.
- William Ginsberg, 75, American professor of environmental law at Hofstra University and former New York City commissioner of parks and recreation.
- Reza Hassanzadeh, 33, Iranian professional soccer player with Teraktor Sazi F.C., injuries from car accident.
- Stanley Kunitz, 100, American Pulitzer Prize-winning poet and former US poet laureate.
- Jim Lemon, 78, American baseball player (Washington Senators/Minnesota Twins), cancer.
- Paul Marco, 78, American actor (Plan 9 from Outer Space).
- Robert Bruce Merrifield, 84, American chemist, Nobel Prize laureate (1984).
- Günther Nenning, 84, Austrian journalist, author and political activist.
- Eva Norvind, 62, Norwegian-born Mexican writer and actress, drowning accident.

=== 15 ===
- Joyce Ballantyne, 88, American artist best known for creating the "Coppertone Girl" ad, heart attack.
- George Blackburn, 93, American football player, head football coach at University of Virginia (1965–1970).
- George Crile III, 61, American journalist, CBS News producer, pancreatic cancer.
- Eberhard Esche, 73, German actor.
- Chic Hecht, 77, American politician, former Republican Senator for Nevada, prostate cancer.
- William Henderson, 89, Canadian politician, member of the House of Commons of Canada (1949-1958).
- Judith Moore, 66, American author.
- Cheikha Rimitti, 83, Algerian singer, heart attack.
- David Sharp, 34, British mountaineer.
- Bill Strode, 69, American Pulitzer Prize–winning photographer, cancer.

=== 16 ===
- Clare Boylan, 58, Irish author and journalist, ovarian cancer.
- Beryl Evans, 84, Australian politician, NSW MLC (1984–1995).
- Anthony Murray, 46, New Zealand rugby league player.
- Jorge Porcel, 69, Argentine actor and comedian, complications following gall bladder surgery.
- Dan Ross, 49, American football player (Cincinnati Bengals), suspected heart attack.
- Takahiro Tamura, 77, Japanese movie and television actor, cerebral infarction.

=== 17 ===
- Firmin De Coster, 75, Belgian footballer.
- Cy Feuer, 95, American theatre producer and playwright (Guys and Dolls).
- Eric Forth, 61, British Conservative Member of Parliament and former government minister, bone cancer.
- Nichola Goddard, 26, Canadian soldier, Canadian Forces, first female since WWII to be killed in combat.
- Dan Kennis, 86, American film producer.
- John Marsden, 64, Australian lawyer and civil liberties activist, cancer.
- Sir John Miller, 87, British equestrian and courtier, Crown Equerry to the Queen (1961–1987).
- Daniel Owino Misiani, 66, Tanzanian Benga musician, car accident.
- Mieczysław Nowak, 69, Polish weightlifter and Olympian (1964, 1968, 1972).
- Mustafa Yücel Özbilgin, 63, Turkish prominent judge sitting in Turkey's highest court, shot dead.
- Ramesh Parekh, 65, Indian poet.
- Laurence Shurtliff, 61, American music executive and roadie (Grateful Dead), lung cancer.
- Robert Edward Varner, 84, American district judge (United States District Court for the Middle District of Alabama).

=== 18 ===
- Jaan Eilart, 73, Estonian biogeographer.
- Stephen Fleet, 69, British researcher in mineral sciences and Former Registrary, Deputy Vice-Chancellor and Master of Downing College, Cambridge.
- George M. Foster, 92, American anthropologist.
- Morris P. Glushien, 96, American lawyer, general counsel for the International Ladies' Garment Workers' Union.
- Bob Hobbs, 81, Australian rugby league footballer.
- Hans Horrevoets, 32, Dutch sailor, swept overboard while competing in Volvo Ocean Race.
- Stan Jones, 91, British Olympic runner (1948).
- Maksim Kahan, 88, Israeli Olympic shooter (1964).
- Alexander Leibkind, 53, German judoka and Olympian (1976).
- Andrew Martinez, 33, American activist, the "Naked Guy" at the University of California, Berkeley, apparent suicide by asphyxiation.
- Irving Meretsky, 94, Canadian Olympic basketball player (1936).
- Vitor Negrete, 38, Brazilian mountaineer, died after reaching the peak of Mount Everest without supplementary oxygen.
- Michael O'Riordan, 88, Irish chairman of the Communist Party of Ireland and International Brigades veteran.
- Kiyan Prince, 15, British youth team player with English football team Queens Park Rangers, stabbed.
- Robert Reid, 81, American chemical engineer.
- Gilbert Sorrentino, 77, American novelist (Mulligan Stew).

=== 19 ===
- Yitzhak Ben Aharon, 99, Israeli left-wing politician, founder of the Israeli Labor Party.
- Edward R. Becker, 73, American former chief judge of the United States Court of Appeals for the Third Circuit.
- Peter Bryant, 82, British television producer (Doctor Who, Paul Temple) and actor (The Grove Family).
- Freddie Garrity, 69, English singer (Freddie and the Dreamers), heart disease.
- Dharmalingam Kannan, 69, Indian footballer and Olympian (1960).
- Robert Makzoumi, 87-88, Egyptian Olympic basketball player (1948).
- Alan Sapper, 75, British trade unionist.
- Tee Jay, 44, Ghanaian-born British boxer and Olympian (1984).

=== 20 ===
- JoAnna Lund, 61, American cookbook author, cancer.
- Bobby Jack Fowler, 66, American rapist and suspected murderer.
- Les Olive, 78, English Assistant Secretary of Manchester United at time of Munich air disaster, prostate cancer.
- Cherd Songsri, 74, Thai film director, cancer.
- Nic Stene, 84, Norwegian Olympic speed skater (1952).
- Annis Stukus, 91, Canadian Hall of Fame football player and coach (Edmonton Eskimos).
- Tommy Watt, 80, British jazz bandleader.

=== 21 ===
- Spencer Clark, 19, American racecar driver, traffic collision.
- Katherine Dunham, 96, American dancer and choreographer.
- Margaret Erskine, 80, British long jumper and Olympian (1948).
- Andy Radford, 62, British Anglican bishop, Bishop of Taunton, brain tumour.
- Sherman Skolnick, 75, American Illinois anti-corruption activist, heart attack.
- Inger Louise Valle, 84, Norwegian politician, Minister of Justice (1973–1979).
- Billy Walker, 77, American country music performer and member of the Grand Ole Opry, traffic accident.

=== 22 ===
- Heather Crowe, 61, Canadian anti-smoking activist, lung cancer.
- Hamza El Din, 76, Nubian Egyptian oud player.
- Jack Fallon, 90, Canadian-born British jazz double bassist.
- Lee Jong-wook, 61, Korean Director-General of the World Health Organization, brain thrombus.
- Lilia Prado, 78, Mexican actress, multiple organ failure.
- Eero Salonen, 73, Finnish basketball player and Olympian (1952).

=== 23 ===
- Philippe Amaury, 66, French media owner, cancer.
- Clifford Antone, 56, American Austin blues club owner, heart attack.
- Lloyd Bentsen, 85, American vice-presidential candidate, Senator, and Treasury Secretary under Clinton.
- James W. Carey, 71, American professor of journalism at Columbia University, author.
- Ray Cale, 83, Welsh rugby player, dual international for Wales in rugby union and rugby league.
- Ian Copeland, 57, American music promoter and agent, older brother of Stewart Copeland of The Police, melanoma.
- Milan Damjanović, 62, Serbian footballer.
- Bracha Eden, 78, Israeli pianist, brain hemorrhage.
- Kazimierz Górski, 85, Polish former coach of Poland national football team, cancer.
- Jim Trimble, 87, American football coach (Philadelphia Eagles), emphysema.

=== 24 ===
- Eric Bedser, 87, English cricketer for Surrey, and elder twin brother of Sir Alec Bedser.
- Henry Bumstead, 91, American art director (To Kill a Mockingbird, The Sting, Vertigo), Oscar winner (1963, 1974), prostate cancer.
- Harold Dembo, 90, American basketball player.
- Robert Giaimo, 86, American Congressman for Connecticut 3rd District (1959−1981), lung ailments.
- Fritz Klein, 73, Austrian-born psychiatrist and researcher.
- Anderson Mazoka, 63, Zambian politician, chief opposition leader in Zambia.
- Bernard Ostry, 78, Canadian chair and CEO of TVOntario, civil servant and philanthropist, cancer.
- Claude Piéplu, 83, French actor, cancer.
- Heinz Stettler, 54, Swiss bobsledder and Olympian (1984).
- John Wheeldon, 76, Australian federal politician, former Australian Labor Party Senator and minister in the Whitlam government.

=== 25 ===
- Sir Julian Bullard, 78, British diplomat.
- Anton Cerer, 89, Slovenian swimmer and Olympian (1936, 1948).
- Elizabeth Connelly, 77, American politician, former member of the New York State Assembly representing Staten Island, cancer.
- Desmond Dekker, 64, Jamaican ska musician, heart attack.
- Lars Gyllensten, 84, Swedish author, physician, and member of the Swedish Academy.
- Wilber Brotherton Huston, 93, American scientist and retired NASA mission director.
- Tobías Lasser, 95, Venezuelan botanist, founder of the Botanic Garden of Caracas, natural causes.
- Donald Rudolph, 85, US Army soldier awarded the Medal of Honor during World War II, Alzheimer's disease.
- Grigory Verichev, 49, Soviet Russian judoka and Olympian (1988).
- Mari Yonehara, 56, Japanese essayist, ovarian cancer.

=== 26 ===
- Adeeb, 72, Pakistani actor.
- Milicent Bagot, 99, British intelligence officer.
- James Bostock, 88, British painter.
- Horondino José da Silva aka "Dino Sete Cordas", 88, Brazilian virtuoso of the seven-string guitar.
- Selvin González, 24, Salvadoran footballer.
- György Ipacs, 73, Hungarian Olympic swimmer (1952).
- Tuomo Kerola, 48, Finnish Olympic swimmer (1976).
- Alan Kotok, 64, American early video game designer (Spacewar!), engineer for Digital Equipment.
- Carl Kuntze, 83, Dutch Olympic rower (1952).
- Ric Mancini, 73, American actor.
- Mahmoud al-Majzoub aka Abu Hamza, 41, Palestinian Islamic Jihad leader, assassination by bombing.
- Édouard Michelin, 42, French CEO of Michelin, boating accident off the Île de Sein.
- Kevin O'Flanagan, 86, Irish former association football and rugby union international, and IOC member, heart problems.
- Anita Roberts, 64, American molecular biologist at the National Cancer Institute, stomach cancer.
- Ted Schroeder, 84, American tennis player, winner at Wimbledon (1949) and the U.S. Open (1942), cancer.
- Raymond Triboulet, 99, French member of the French Resistance during World War II, member of the French Parliament and government minister.

=== 27 ===
- Harold Falls, 96, American ophthalmologist.
- Paul Gleason, 67, American actor (The Breakfast Club, Die Hard, Trading Places), mesothelioma.
- Craig Heyward, 39, American football player (New Orleans Saints, Atlanta Falcons, Chicago Bears), complications from a brain tumor.
- Fernando Romeo Lucas García, 81, Guatemalan politician, former President of Guatemala, complications of Alzheimer's disease.
- Thelma Leeds, 95, American actress, widow of Parkyakarkus.
- Jim Mello, 85, American football player.
- Michael Riffaterre, 81, French-born professor at Columbia University and scholar of French literature.
- Alex Toth, 77, American comic book artist and cartoonist (Space Ghost, Birdman and the Galaxy Trio).
- Apache Bull Ramos, 68, American professional wrestler, shoulder infection.

=== 28 ===
- Edward Aldwell, 68, American music theorist and pianist specializing in Bach, automotive accident.
- James Archibald, 94, American judge.
- Fermín Chávez, 82, Argentine historian, complications from renal failure.
- Amin El-Esnawi, 69, Egyptian footballer and Olympian (1960, 1964).
- Sue Fear, 43, Australian mountaineer, climbing accident.
- Umberto Masetti, 80, Italian motorcycle racer, the first Italian World Champion class 500cc in 1950 and 1952, pulmonary strokes.
- Frank Morze, 73, American football player (Boston College Eagles, San Francisco 49ers, Cleveland Browns).
- Masumi Okada, 70, French-born Japanese actor (Shogun), throat cancer.
- Ramsay D. Potts, 89, American air force general.
- Tony Sardisco, 73, American football player (San Francisco 49ers, Washington Redskins, Boston Patriots), heart attack.
- Doris Saunders, 64, Canadian magazine editor, Order of Canada inductee, Alzheimer's disease.
- Thorleif Schjelderup, 86, Norwegian Olympic ski jumper (1948).
- Andrzej Skrzydlewski, 59, Polish Olympic wrestler (1972, 1976).
- Arthur Widmer, 91, American special effects artist, cancer.

=== 29 ===
- Tsurugamine Akio, 77, Japanese sumo wrestler.
- Neville Amadio, 93, Australian flautist, complications from heart attacks.
- Poul Andersen, 84, Danish-born publisher of Bien, the only weekly Danish newspaper in the US, Alzheimer's disease.
- Clarence Bailey, 43, American football player (Miami Dolphins).
- Peter Borsari, 67, American-Swiss celebrity photographer, complications from elective knee surgery.
- James Brolan, 42, British CBS News sound technician, injuries sustained in car bombing in Iraq.
- Paul Douglas, 48, British veteran CBS News cameraman, injuries sustained in car bombing in Iraq.
- Wyn Griffiths, 86, Welsh professional football player (Cardiff City F.C., Newport County A.F.C.), complications from a fall.
- Steve Mizerak, 61, American champion billiards player.
- Omeljan Pritsak, 87, Austrian-born American Harvard professor, scholar and authority on Ukraine.
- Johnny Servoz-Gavin, 64, French racing driver.

=== 30 ===
- Slim Aarons, 89, American photographer, stroke.
- Murat Alyüz, 85-86, Turkish Olympic footballer (1948).
- Marius van Amelsvoort, 75, Dutch politician, State Secretary for Finance.
- Samuel Félix, 29, Mexican modern pentathlete and Olympian (2000).
- Boštjan Hladnik, 77, Slovenian film director.
- Shōhei Imamura, 79, Japanese film director (Black Rain, The Ballad of Narayama, The Eel), liver cancer.
- Bill Kovacs, 56, American computer animation pioneer and Academy Award winner, complications of a stroke.
- David Lloyd, 68, New Zealand botanist.
- Robert Sterling, 88, American actor (Topper).
- Bjørn Vade, 84, Norwegian Olympic middle-distance runner (1948).

=== 31 ===
- Ali Belkacem, 75, French Olympic boxer (1952).
- Miguel Ortiz Berrocal, 73, Spanish sculptor and puzzle creator, prostate cancer.
- Ronald Cranford, 65, American neurologist and bioethicist who developed coma standards, complications of kidney cancer.
- Raymond Davis Jr., 91, American chemist and a winner of the Nobel Prize in Physics in 2002, Alzheimer's disease.
- Lula Mae Hardaway, 76, American songwriter, mother of singer Stevie Wonder, natural causes.
- Zézé, 63, Brazilian footballer.
