= George Terlep =

American football player and coach (1923–2010)

- Terlep during his playing days

No. 16, 64
- Position: Quarterback

Personal information
- Born: April 12, 1923; Elkhart, Indiana, U.S.
- Died: May 17, 2010 (aged 87); Hudson, Florida, U.S.
- Listed height: 5 ft 10 in (1.78 m)
- Listed weight: 180 lb (82 kg)

Career information
- High school: Elkhart (IN)
- College: Notre Dame

Career history

Playing
- Buffalo Bills (1946–1948); Cleveland Browns (1948)

Coaching
- South Carolina, Asst. (1949–1950); Vanderbilt, Asst. (1951–1952); Marquette, Asst. (1953); Penn, Asst. (1954–1955); Indiana, Asst. (1956); CFL Hamilton Tiger-Cats, Asst. (1957); CFL Sask. Roughriders, HC (1958–1959); CFL Ottawa Rough Riders, GM (1959–1962)

Awards and highlights
- AAFC champion (1948); 2× Grey Cup winner (1957, 1960); National champion (1943); Indiana Football Hall of Fame (1985); Elkhart County Sports Hall of Fame

Career statistics
- Games: 35
- Pass yards: 652
- Touchdowns: 9
- Stats at Pro Football Reference

George Rudolph "Duke" Terlep (April 12, 1923 – May 17, 2010) was an American football player, coach, and general manager who was on a college national championship team at Notre Dame in 1943 and won another championship while playing for the Cleveland Browns in the All-America Football Conference (AAFC) in 1948. Terlep also won two Grey Cup championships in the Canadian Football League (CFL), once as an assistant with the Hamilton Tiger-Cats and once as the general manager of the Ottawa Rough Riders.

Terlep grew up in Indiana and was a star on his high school's football team. He went on to play as a backup quarterback at Notre Dame in 1943 under head coach Frank Leahy, but left the following year to serve in the U.S. military during World War II. He played briefly for a team at a military base in Illinois coached by Paul Brown. After the war, Terlep joined the Buffalo Bisons of the newly formed AAFC, playing quarterback there for two years. He joined the Browns in 1948, when Cleveland won all its games and a third straight AAFC championship.

Terlep ended his playing career in 1949 to pursue coaching. He spent several years as a college backfield coach, first at the University of South Carolina, then at Vanderbilt, Marquette, Penn and Indiana. In 1957, he landed a job with the Tiger-Cats, who won the Grey Cup that year. His success there led to his hiring as head coach of the Saskatchewan Roughriders, but he was fired after losing the first 11 games of the 1959 season. He then became general manager of the Ottawa Rough Riders, and was responsible for bringing future hall of fame quarterback Ron Lancaster into the league. Terlep left football in 1962 and returned to his hometown, where he worked in the mobile homes business. He retired in 1985 to Florida, where he died in 2010. He was inducted into the Indiana Football Hall of Fame in 1985.

== Early life and college ==
Terlep grew up in Elkhart, Indiana, and was a standout halfback at the local Elkhart High School starting in 1937. He was named an all-state back by sportswriters in 1941, his senior year. Terlep was also named an All-Northern Indiana Athletic Conference player as the Elkhart Blue Blazers won a conference championship that year.

After high school, Terlep enrolled on a football scholarship at Notre Dame in South Bend, Indiana, a Catholic university near his hometown. He played at quarterback for the Notre Dame Fighting Irish in 1943, when the team finished with a 9–1 win–loss record and won a national championship under coach Frank Leahy. Terlep served as a center and as a backup to quarterback Angelo Bertelli, who won the Heisman Trophy in 1943.

Terlep left Notre Dame toward the end of the 1944 season to join a V-12 Navy College Training Program put in place during World War II. He was transferred to the Great Lakes Naval Training Station in Illinois and played quarterback for the base's football team under Paul Brown, the former head coach at Ohio State. The Great Lakes Bluejackets finished the 1945 season with a 6–4–1 win–loss–tie record that included a victory over Notre Dame. Terlep ran for a touchdown and passed for another against his alma mater.

== Professional career ==
With the war over, Terlep was discharged in 1946 and signed with the Buffalo Bisons, a team in the new All-America Football Conference (AAFC). He began the season as the starting quarterback but was replaced by former Notre Dame teammate George Ratterman as the Bisons finished their first season with a 3–10–1 record. The team followed up with an 8–4–2 record in 1947, when it was renamed the Bills. During the 1948 season, Terlep was traded to the Cleveland Browns, a rival AAFC team coached by Paul Brown. The Browns won all of their games and a third straight AAFC championship that year.

== Coaching career ==
Terlep left the Browns in 1949 and finished his degree at Notre Dame, graduating cum laude in business administration. He then began a coaching career as an assistant at the University of South Carolina after Leahy, his former Notre Dame coach, recommended him. He worked at South Carolina for two seasons under head coach Rex Enright, a fellow Notre Dame graduate. He then moved to a job as an assistant at Vanderbilt University, where he remained through 1952. At Vanderbilt, he worked under head coach Bill Edwards. One of his colleagues there was defensive assistant Steve Belichick, the father of NFL coach Bill Belichick and a close friend of Terlep's until Belichick died in 2005.

Terlep's next stop was as backfield coach at Marquette University in Milwaukee in 1953 under head coach Lisle Blackbourn. Marquette finished with a 6–3–1 record that year, but Blackbourn resigned after the season to become the head coach of the NFL's Green Bay Packers. Terlep was a leading candidate to replace him, but was passed over in favor of Frosty Ferzacca, a Wisconsin high school coach. He left Marquette shortly thereafter to be backfield coach at the University of Pennsylvania under Steve Sebo. After two seasons during which the Penn Quakers failed to win a game, he left and took a job as backfield coach at Indiana University in 1956. He spent one season there.

Terlep moved to Canada in 1957 to become backfield coach for the Hamilton Tiger-Cats of the Canadian Football League (CFL). The team finished that season with a 10–4 record and beat the Winnipeg Blue Bombers in November to win the Grey Cup, the league's championship. The following January, Terlep was named head coach of the Saskatchewan Roughriders, another CFL team, and given a two-year contract. During his first year at the helm, the team finished third in the Western Interprovincial Football Union, the league's western division, with a record of 7–7–2. The Roughriders lost in the semifinals of the conference playoffs to the Edmonton Eskimos, but Terlep was given a new two-year contract after the season. After losing the first 11 games of the 1959 season, however, Terlep was fired in September and replaced by Frank Tripucka. He immediately joined the Ottawa Rough Riders as backfield coach following his dismissal.

Terlep was named Ottawa's general manager within three months of his hiring as an assistant, succeeding Jim McCaffrey. Terlep's responsibilities included recruiting and signing players to improve Ottawa's roster, and he was responsible for bringing quarterback Ron Lancaster to the CFL in 1960 on the advice of Bill Edwards, his former Vanderbilt colleague. Lancaster was viewed as too small in stature to play in the American professional leagues, but he became one of the most successful quarterbacks of his era in the CFL and is a member of the Canadian Football Hall of Fame. With Lancaster, the Rough Riders finished with a 9–5 regular-season record in 1960 and beat the Edmonton Eskimos 16–6 to win the 48th Grey Cup. The Rough Riders finished second in their division in 1961, but Terlep resigned after a 6–7–1 season in 1962 and was replaced by the team's former wide receiver Red O'Quinn. Terlep, who hosted a radio and television program about football, had clashed with Rough Riders head coach Frank Clair over the team's play-calling.

== Later life and death ==
Terlep left football in 1962 and went back to Elkhart, where he ran a recreational vehicle and mobile homes business. He retired in 1985 and moved to Florida, where he died in 2010 of cancer. He and his wife Alma had three sons and two daughters.

Terlep was inducted into the Indiana Football Hall of Fame in 1985. He is also a member of the Elkhart County Sports Hall of Fame.
