= Roy Mitchell =

Roy Mitchell may refer to:

- Roy Mitchell (baseball) (1885–1959), American baseball player
- Roy Mitchell-Cárdenas (born 1977), Mexican-American musician and author
- Roy Mitchell (ice hockey) (born 1969), retired Canadian ice hockey player
- Roy Mitchell (long jumper) (born 1955), British former long jumper
- Roy Mitchell (murderer), African-American serial killer convicted of murder
- Roy Mitchell (sailor) (1913–1968), British Olympic sailor
- Roy Mitchell (theatre practitioner) (1884–1944), Canadian-American theatre practitioner
