= Gurruchaga =

Gurruchaga is a Spanish form of the Basque surname Gurrutxaga. Notable people with the surname include:

- Emilio Gurruchaga (born 1934), Spanish sailor
- José Ramón Gurruchaga Ezama (1931–2017), Peruvian Roman Catholic bishop
- Juan José Gurruchaga (born 1977), Chilean actor
- Itziar Gurrutxaga (born 1977), Spanish footballer
- Zuhaitz Gurrutxaga
