= Víctor Fragola =

Argentine sailor

Personal information
- Born: 6 August 1923; Buenos Aires, Argentina
- Died: 21 March 2010 (aged 86); Buenos Aires, Argentina

Sport
- Sport: Sailing

Víctor Fragola (6 August 1923 – 21 March 2010) was an Argentine sailor. He competed in the Star event at the 1960 Summer Olympics.
