= Royal Corinthian Yacht Club =

Yacht club in Burnham-on-Crouch, Essex, England

Coordinates: 51.6236°N 0.8208°E

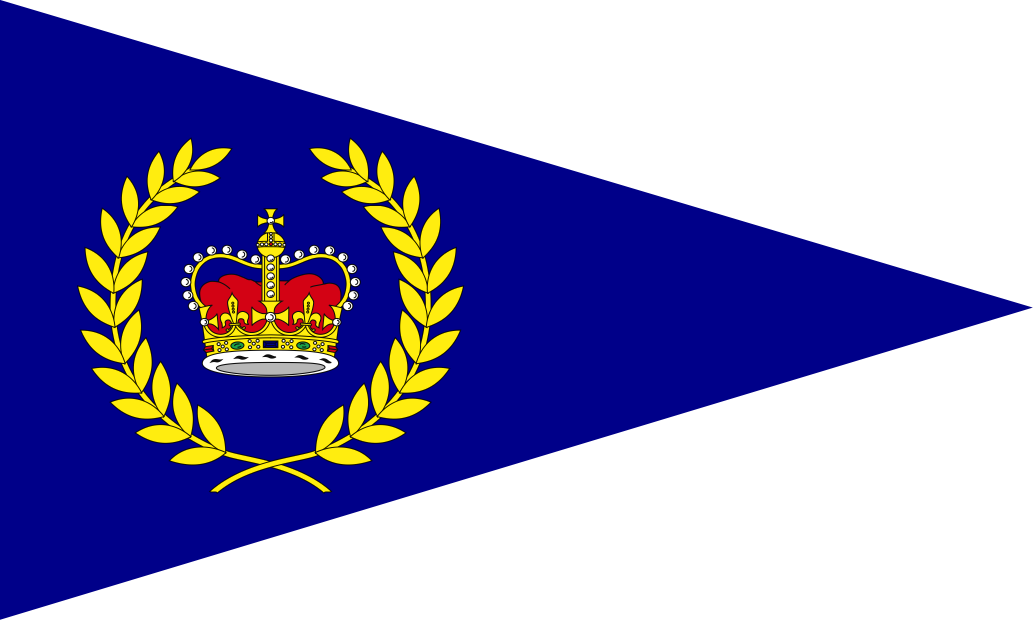
- Burgee

- Ensign
- Short name: RCYC
- Founded: 1872; 154 years ago
- Location: Burnham-on-Crouch, Essex, and at Cowes, Isle of Wight
- Commodore: Mary Makey
- Website: royalcorinthian.co.uk

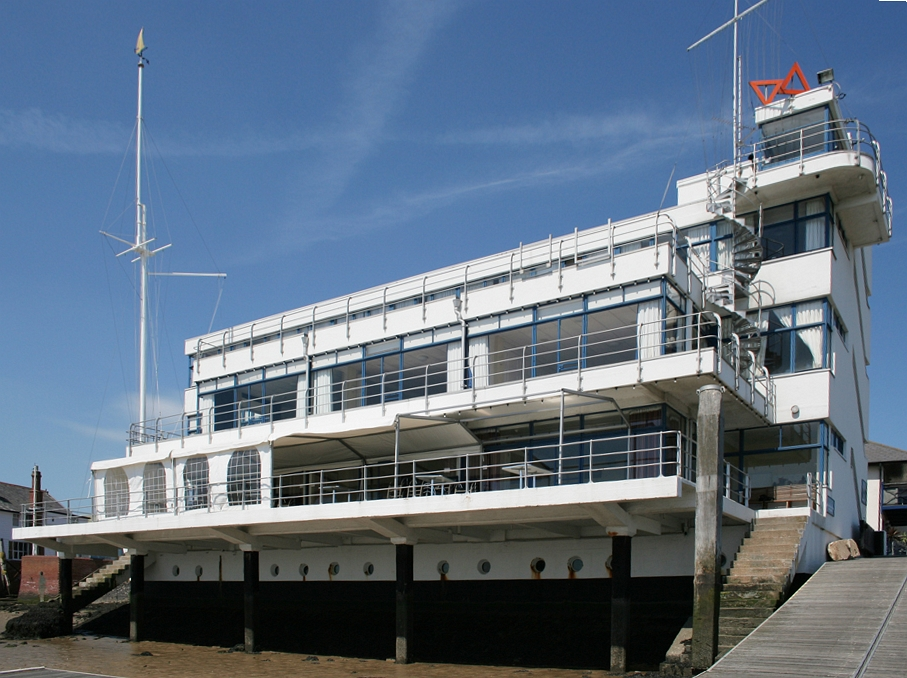
The Burnham-on-Crouch Royal Corinthian Yacht Club, designed by Joseph Emberton in 1931.

The Royal Corinthian Yacht Club is a watersports organisation based at Burnham-on-Crouch, Essex.

== History ==
=== Early history ===
The club was founded at Erith, Kent in 1872 and moved to Burnham-on-Crouch, Essex in 1892. Antecedent clubs later absorbed into the Club include the Hammersmith Sailing Club, which changed its name to the London Sailing Club and moved to Burnham in 1897 (having merged with the Junior Thames Yacht Club in 1895), and the Eastern Yacht Club, which was amalgamated with the Royal Corinthian in 1907. The Club provided the crew for the Endeavour in Thomas Sopwith's America's Cup Challenge in 1934 after a strike of Sopwith's professional crew. Five members of the club crewed the boat Lalage in the 1936 Summer Olympic Games, winning the gold medal in the 6 metre class.

=== Burnham-on-Crouch ===
In 1931 Tiny Mitchell became Commodore of the club where he was responsible for completing the new clubhouse at Burnham-on-Crouch. The Grade II* listed building was designed by Joseph Emberton and represented Britain's contribution to the International Exhibition of Modern Architecture held at the Museum of Modern Art in New York City in 1932. The building is one of the few examples of the International style of architecture in Britain.

=== Cowes ===
In 1948, the club established a southern branch at Cowes, taking as its local clubhouse Castle Rock, a large house purchased from London hotelier Rosa Lewis. In 1988 the clubhouse was sold to commercial interests; however, the buyer subsequently went into receivership and in 1993 the clubhouse was re-purchased from the receiver by a small group of members for the benefit of the club.

In 2015, having been run as a separate legal entity under the name Royal Corinthian Yacht Club, Cowes, the club that operated from the Cowes clubhouse merged with the Royal Ocean Racing Club (RORC), and its premises are now the Cowes clubhouse of the RORC. The Royal Corinthian heritage was perpetuated by a newly-created class of 'Corinthian' members within the RORC, for those unable to meet the RORC's standard membership requirements.

== See also ==
- Crouch Yacht Club
- Royal Burnham Yacht Club
