= Mitchell Construction =

British Civil Engineering Business

- Industry: Construction
- Founded: 1933
- Defunct: 1973
- Fate: Acquired
- Successor: Tarmac
- Headquarters: Peterborough, UK
- Key people: David Morrell, (Chairman)

Mitchell Construction was once a leading British civil engineering business based in Peterborough.

== History ==
The business was founded by F.G. (Tiny) Mitchell in London in 1933 as an offshoot of Mitchell Engineering, his engineering business. In 1940, the Company moved to Peterborough because of the destruction created in London by The Blitz. David Morrell took over management of the business from Tiny Mitchell in 1954. During the 1950s, the business expanded rapidly by exploiting numerous hydro-electric power opportunities in Scotland.

In 1962, Mitchell Construction acquired Kinnear Moodie, a leading tunneling business.

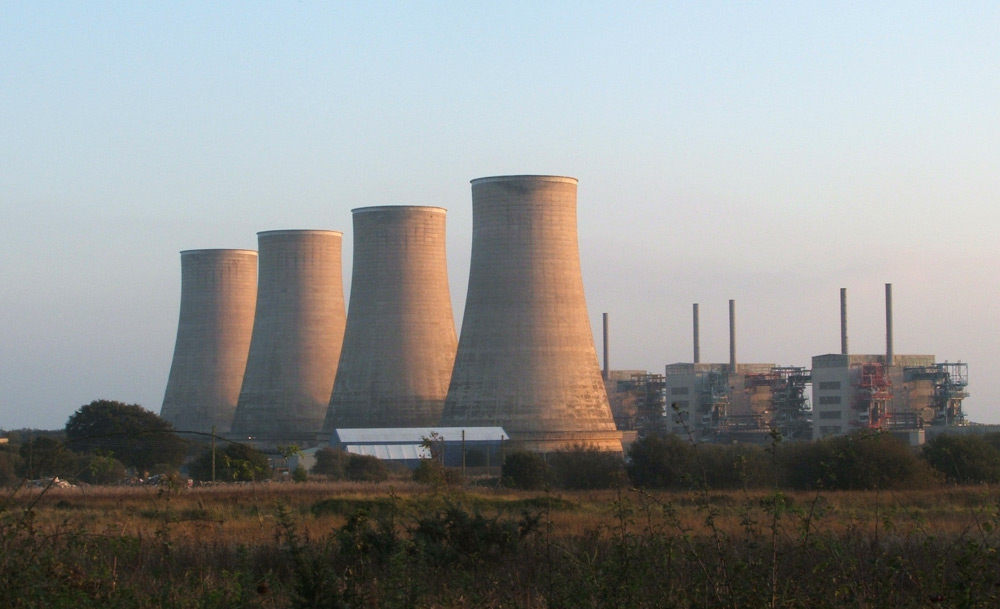
Chapelcross nuclear power station built by Mitchell Construction

== Major projects ==
Major projects undertaken by the business included:

- The Loch Cluanie Dam completed in 1957
- Chapelcross Power Station completed in 1959
- The Windscale Advanced Gas Cooled Reactor at Sellafield completed in 1962
- Fawley Power Station at Southampton completed in 1962
- The Scotswood Bridge completed in 1967
- Cow Green Reservoir completed in 1971
- The Kariba Dam North Cavern completed in 1973

== Demise of the business ==
After getting into financial difficulties over the Kariba Dam North Cavern project, the company was acquired by Tarmac and integrated into Tarmac Construction in 1973.
