= Frederick Gilbert Mitchell =

British businessman (1884–1962)

Frederick Gilbert Mitchell (20 January 1884 – 8 October 1962) was an English civil engineer and businessman who founded a major international construction business and promoted the development of a new range of helicopters.

== Biography ==
Born on 20 January 1884, in London, Mitchell became an apprentice on the railways at age 14. After working for a firm of consulting engineers as a draughtsman, he joined the engineering firm of Fraser and Chalmers. During World War I he worked as a civilian troubleshooter for Lord Kitchener. After the War Mitchell established an engineering business in London supplying coal handling plant and boilers for power stations. In 1933, he diversified into construction activities founding Mitchell Construction which focused on the construction of power stations and which, after his death, was to become one of the largest construction companies in the UK.

His passion was sailing and in 1931 he became Commodore of the Royal Corinthian Yacht Club where he was responsible for completing the new clubhouse at Burnham-on-Crouch. During the 1950s, Mitchell's business expanded rapidly enabling him to acquire a former minesweeper and restore it. He instituted the Finn Gold Cup for the Finn Class of Sailing in 1956.

In 1960, Mitchell together with J.S. Shapiro established Rotorcraft, a business which developed the Grasshopper series of helicopters.

Mitchell married Hilda Butcher in 1911, having two sons. Their eldest son Roy was a sailor who competed in the 1960 Olympics later succeeding his father as chairman of Mitchell Engineering Ltd.

Mitchell lived at Clopton Manor in Northamptonshire. He died in hospital in Zurich, on 8 October 1962, aged 78.
