= DeWitt, Iowa =

- City
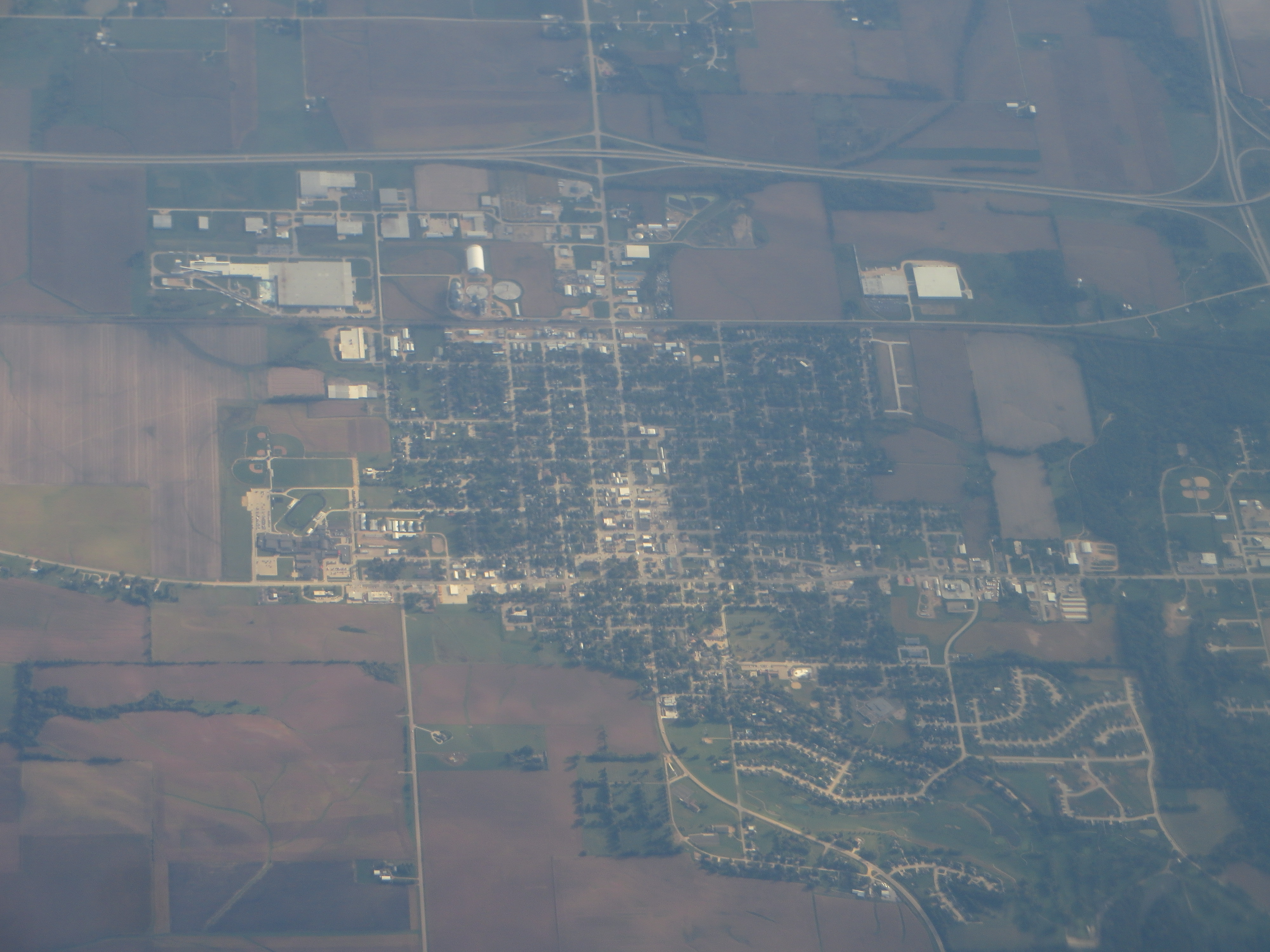
- Aerial view of DeWitt

- Location of DeWitt, Iowa
- Coordinates: 41°49′22″N 90°32′41″W
- Country: United States
- State: Iowa
- County: Clinton

Area
  - Total: 6.22 sq mi (16.12 km^{2})
  - Land: 6.22 sq mi (16.11 km^{2})
  - Water: 0.0039 sq mi (0.01 km^{2})
- Elevation: 699 ft (213 m)

Population (2020)
  - Total: 5,514
  - Density: 886.2/sq mi (342.17/km^{2})
- Time zone: UTC-6 (Central (CST))
  - Summer (DST): UTC-5 (CDT)
- ZIP code: 52742
- Area code: 563
- FIPS code: 19-21180
- GNIS feature ID: 2394476
- Website: www.cityofdewittiowa.org

DeWitt (Note: /dəˈwɪt/ or /ˈdiːwɪt/) is a city in Clinton County, Iowa, United States. The population was 5,514 at the time of the 2020 census, which represented a 9.2% increase over that of 2000, making it the fastest growing city in Clinton County.

== History ==
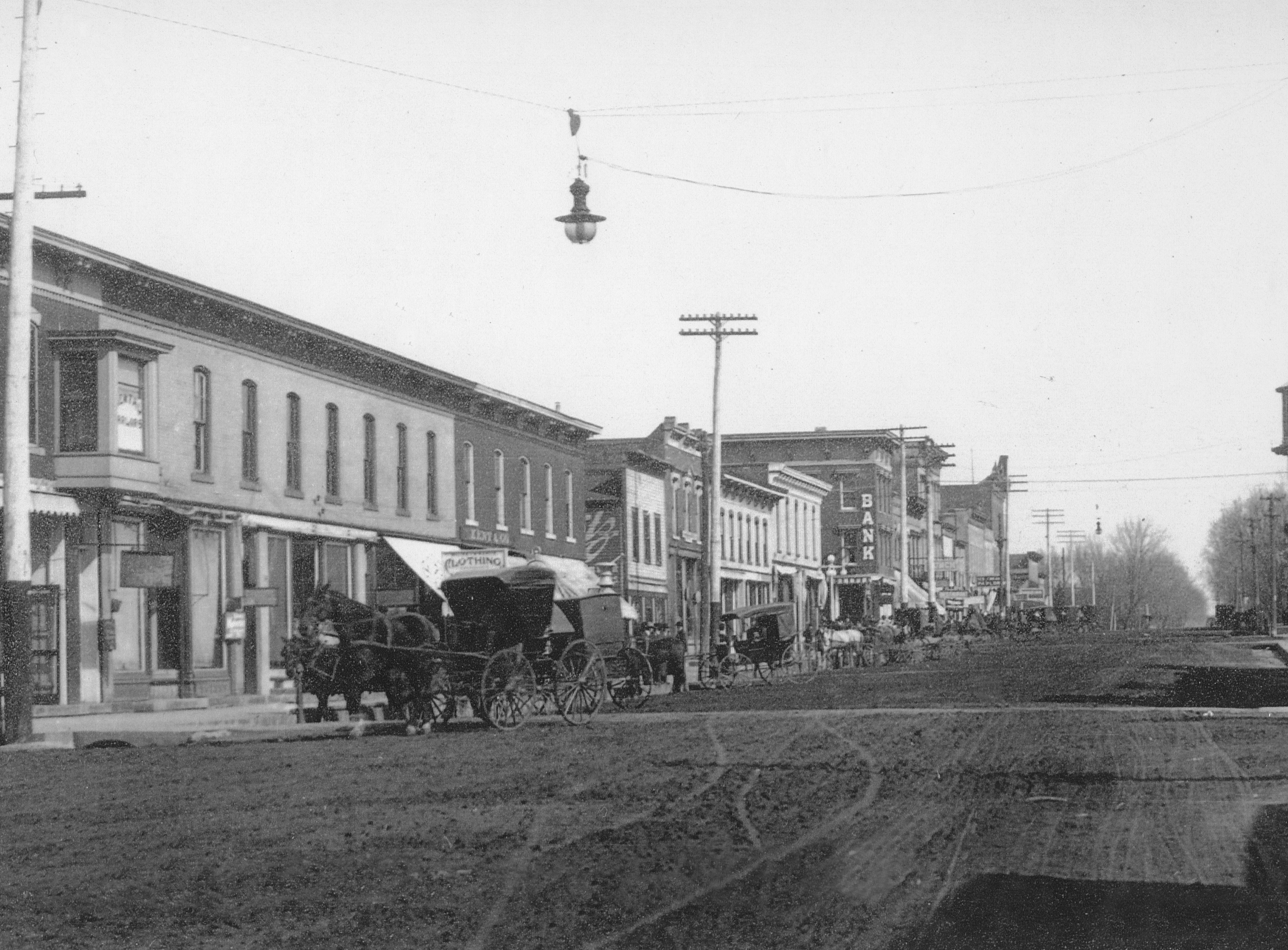
Main Street, 1908

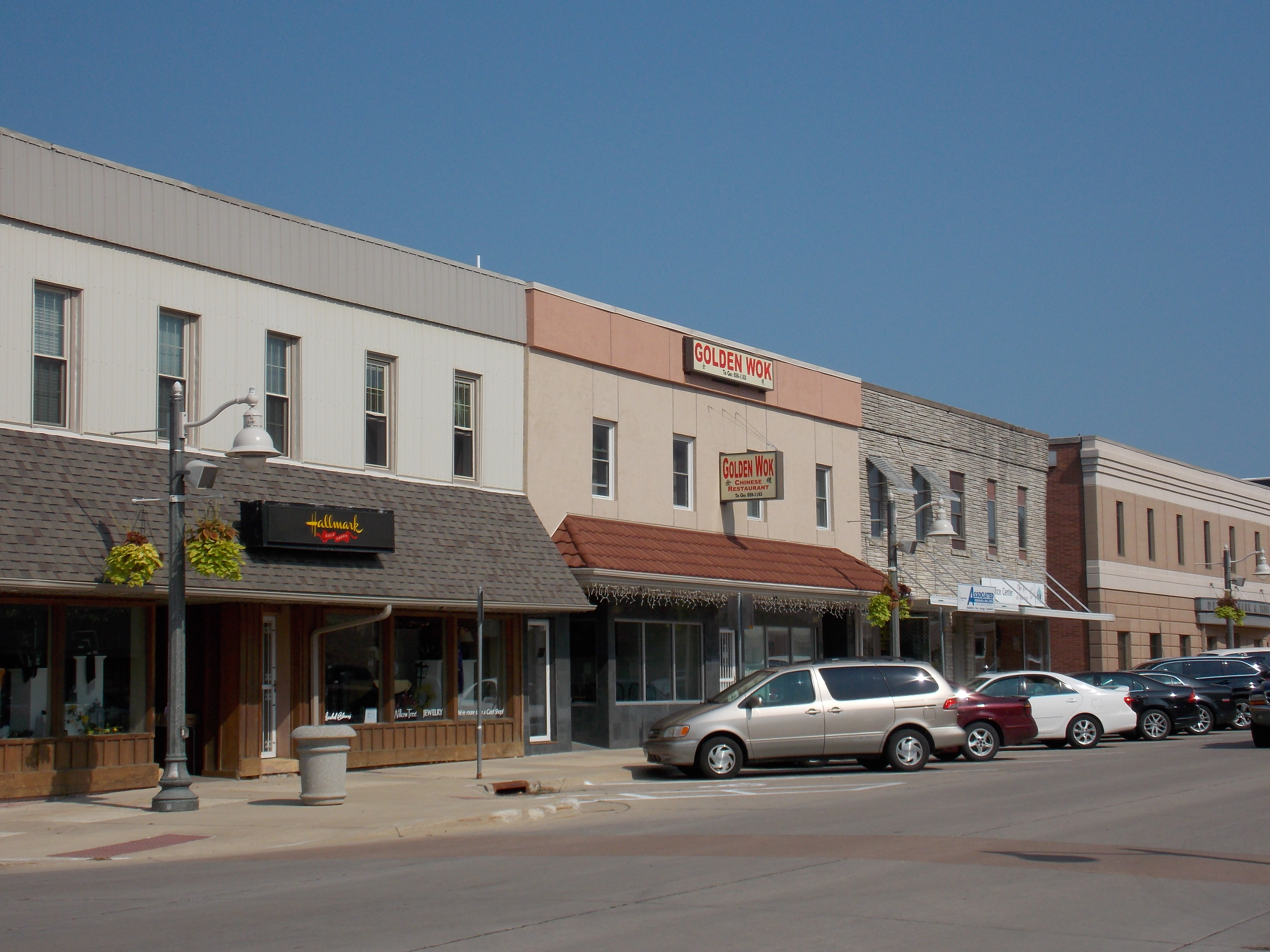
Buildings along Sixth Avenue

DeWitt was platted in 1836. The city started under the name Vandenburg, but was later named after DeWitt Clinton (1769–1828), an early American politician who served as United States Senator and sixth Governor of New York.

Ralph Waldo Emerson gave a lyceum lecture at DeWitt in January 1866.

== Geography ==
According to the United States Census Bureau, the city has a total area of 5.98 square miles (15.49 km^{2}), all land.

== Demographics ==
Historical population
| Census | Pop. | Note | %± |
|---|---|---|---|
| 1870 | 1,749 | | — |
| 1880 | 1,608 | | −8.1% |
| 1890 | 1,359 | | −15.5% |
| 1900 | 1,383 | | 1.8% |
| 1910 | 1,654 | | 19.6% |
| 1920 | 1,849 | | 11.8% |
| 1930 | 2,041 | | 10.4% |
| 1940 | 2,205 | | 8.0% |
| 1950 | 2,644 | | 19.9% |
| 1960 | 3,224 | | 21.9% |
| 1970 | 3,647 | | 13.1% |
| 1980 | 4,512 | | 23.7% |
| 1990 | 4,514 | | 0.0% |
| 2000 | 5,049 | | 11.9% |
| 2010 | 5,322 | | 5.4% |
| 2020 | 5,514 | | 3.6% |
U.S. Decennial Census

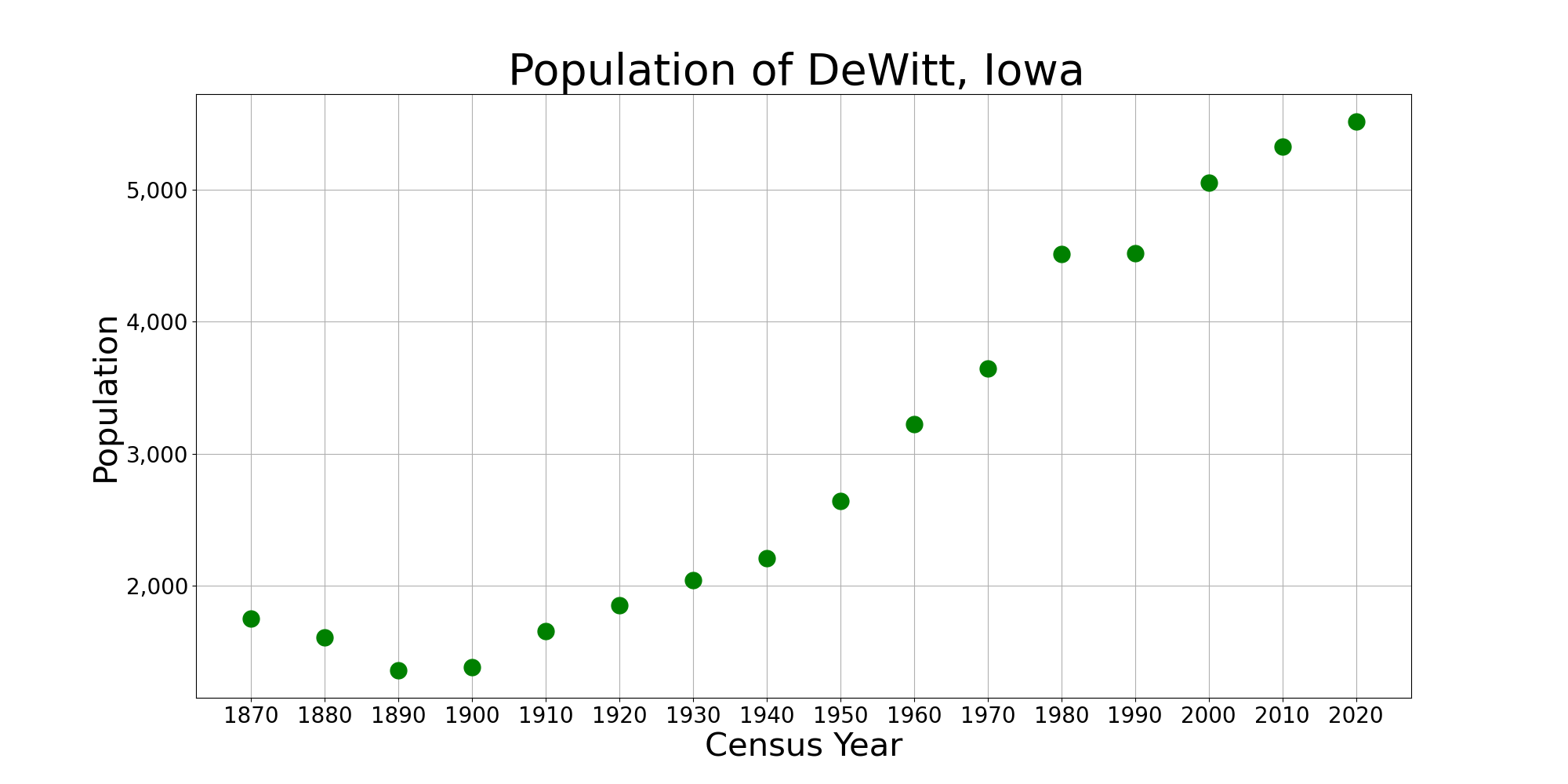
The population of DeWitt, Iowa from US census data

=== 2020 census ===
As of the 2020 census, DeWitt had a population of 5,514, with 2,266 households and 1,432 families residing in the city. The median age was 39.6 years. 25.2% of residents were under the age of 18 and 19.3% were 65 years of age or older. For every 100 females there were 92.8 males, and for every 100 females age 18 and over there were 88.9 males age 18 and over. The population density was 886.2 inhabitants per square mile (342.2/km^{2}).

93.3% of residents lived in urban areas, while 6.7% lived in rural areas.

Of the 2,266 households, 30.5% had children under the age of 18 living in them. Of all households, 50.2% were married-couple households, 15.4% were households with a male householder and no spouse or partner present, and 28.6% were households with a female householder and no spouse or partner present. About 31.6% of all households were made up of individuals and 16.4% had someone living alone who was 65 years of age or older.

There were 2,403 housing units, of which 5.7% were vacant. The homeowner vacancy rate was 2.1% and the rental vacancy rate was 6.6%. Housing unit density was 386.2 per square mile (149.1/km^{2}).

Racial composition as of the 2020 census
| Race | Number | Percent |
|---|---|---|
| White | 5,117 | 92.8% |
| Black or African American | 100 | 1.8% |
| American Indian and Alaska Native | 5 | 0.1% |
| Asian | 19 | 0.3% |
| Native Hawaiian and Other Pacific Islander | 0 | 0.0% |
| Some other race | 41 | 0.7% |
| Two or more races | 232 | 4.2% |
| Hispanic or Latino (of any race) | 175 | 3.2% |

=== 2010 census ===
As of the census of 2010, there were 5,322 people, 2,208 households, and 1,415 families residing in the city. The population density was 890.0 inhabitants per square mile (343.6/km^{2}). There were 2,306 housing units at an average density of 385.6 per square mile (148.9/km^{2}). The racial makeup of the city was 97.1% White, 0.8% African American, 0.1% Native American, 0.4% Asian, 0.2% from other races, and 1.5% from two or more races. Hispanic or Latino of any race were 1.9% of the population.

There were 2,208 households, of which 32.4% had children under the age of 18 living with them, 50.9% were married couples living together, 10.2% had a female householder with no husband present, 3.0% had a male householder with no wife present, and 35.9% were non-families. 31.5% of all households were made up of individuals, and 15.9% had someone living alone who was 65 years of age or older. The average household size was 2.37 and the average family size was 2.99.

The median age in the city was 39.7 years. 25.3% of residents were under the age of 18; 7.4% were between the ages of 18 and 24; 24.1% were from 25 to 44; 26% were from 45 to 64; and 17.2% were 65 years of age or older. The gender makeup of the city was 47.4% male and 52.6% female.

The median income for a household in the city was $44,720, and the median income for a family was $54,063. Males had a median income of $37,951 versus $25,457 for females. The per capita income for the city was $19,717. About 2.8% of families and 6.2% of the population were below the poverty line, including 4.1% of those under age 18 and 10.1% of those age 65 or over.

== Government ==
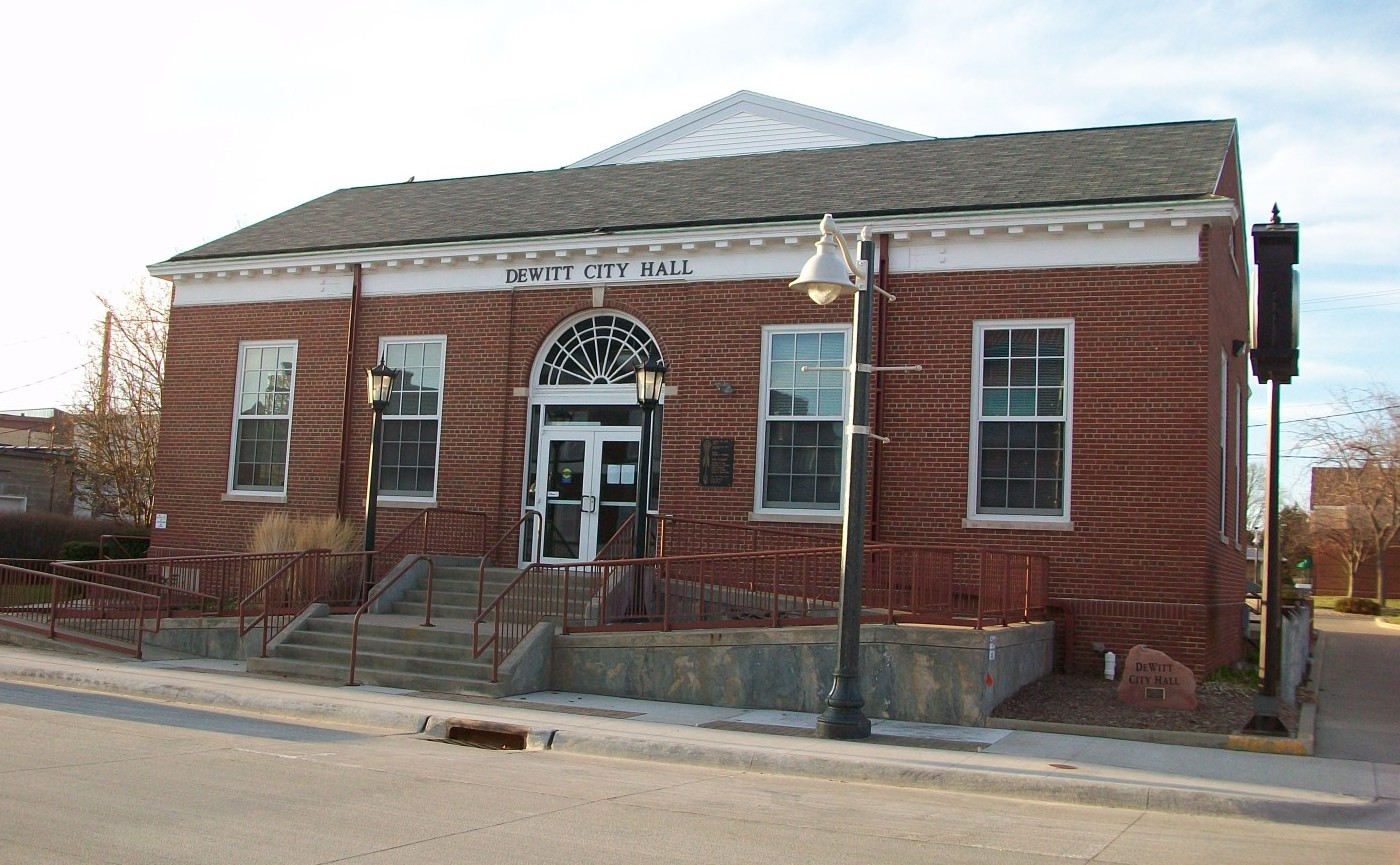
DeWitt City Hall

DeWitt is governed by a mayor and five-member council. The mayor is Steve Hasenmiller.

== Railroads ==
DeWitt is served by the Union Pacific along the south side on tracks originally built by the Chicago and Northwestern railroad. Until 1971, the Milwaukee Road entered DeWitt from the north and ran along 7th Avenue before crossing the tracks of the former Chicago & Northwestern into Scott County. The tracks between DeWitt and Eldridge Junction were abandoned in 1931. The Milwaukee Road rail between Maquoketa and DeWitt was abandoned by 1970. Several buildings along 7th Avenue still show signs of rail loading and unloading. These include apartments, once a paper box factory at the northwest corner of 7th Avenue and 7th Street, as well as sheds and elevator buildings between 5th and 7th Streets. The old Chicago & Northwestern Depot was destroyed by fire circa 1969 and never rebuilt. The depot for the Milwaukee Road was at the northeast corner of 7th Avenue and 7th Street. It was converted into commercial use, but has since been demolished.

== Area highways ==
DeWitt is served by U.S. Highways 30 & 61. At one time the highways met at the northwest corner of the City Park to the north of the city center business district. By 1980 both highways were moved to new alignments around the south and west sides of DeWitt, first suggested in a plan from the early 1960s.

== Education ==
DeWitt is home to the Central DeWitt Community School District. In addition to DeWitt, the nearby cities of Grand Mound, Low Moor, and Welton are also a part the school district. It was previously known as the Central Clinton Community School District until July 1, 2014.

St. Joseph Catholic Church operates a K-8 school. The Junior and High School portions was closed in the 1960s. The mascot for St. Joseph School is the Eagle.

Frances Banta Waggoner Community Library is the local community library.

== Media ==
The DeWitt Observer serves as DeWitt's primary local newspaper. In addition to DeWitt, The Observer also serves much of rural eastern Clinton County.

== Notable people ==
- David C. Hilmers, NASA astronaut
- JoAnna Lund, author and cook
- Casey Kreiter, NFL long-snapper
