= István Jutasi =

Hungarian sailor

Personal information
- Nationality: Hungarian
- Born: 22 December 1929; Barcs, Hungary
- Died: 24 December 2011 (aged 82); Budapest, Hungary

Sport
- Sport: Sailing

István Jutasi (22 December 1929 – 24 December 2011) was a Hungarian sailor. He competed in the Star event at the 1960 Summer Olympics.
