= Mário Quina =

Portuguese sailor (1930–2017)

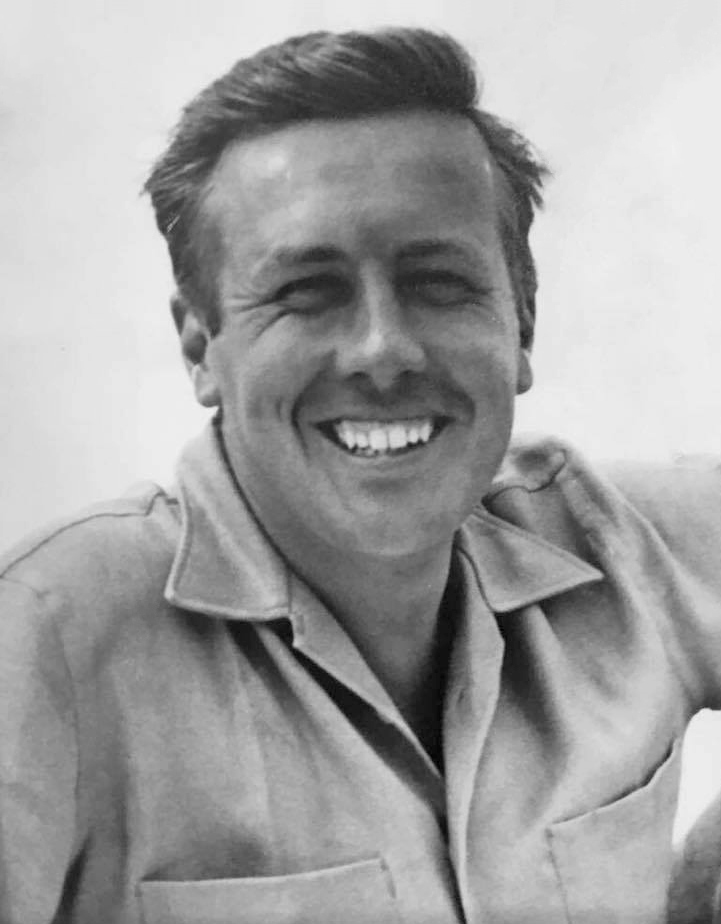

Personal information
- Full name: Mário Gentil Quina
- Nationality: Portuguese
- Born: 1 January 1930 Estoril, Cascais, Portugal
- Died: 8 September 2017 (aged 87)
- Height: 182 cm (6 ft 0 in)
- Weight: 75 kg (165 lb)

Sailing career
- Sport: Sailing
Medal record
Men's sailing
Representing Portugal
Olympic Games
Silver medal – second place	1960 Rome	Star

Mário Gentil Quina, GOIH (1 January 1930 – 8 September 2017) was a Portuguese sailor. He competed at the 1952, 1960, 1968 and 1972 Olympics. In 1952 he finished 17th in one-person dingy. In 1960 he won a silver medal in the star class, together with his brother José Manuel Quina; the brothers placed 17th at the 1968 Games. In 1972 he took part in the three-person keelboat event, together with his another brother Francisco Quina and finished 21st.

Quina mostly competed in the star class (doubles) and participated in seven world championships between 1953 and 1967. He won a bronze medal in this category at the 1965 European Championships.

== Awards ==
- Olympic Medal Nobre Guedes (1960)
- Grand Officer of the Order of Prince Henry
