= Yoshimatsu Sakaibara =

Japanese sailor

Personal information
- Nationality: Japanese
- Born: 10 October 1931; Kanagawa, Japan

Sport
- Sport: Sailing

Yoshimatsu Sakaibara (born 10 October 1931) is a Japanese sailor. He competed in the Star event at the 1960 Summer Olympics.
