= Janko Kosmina =

Slovenian sailor

Personal information
- Nationality: Slovenian
- Born: 25 June 1935 (age 89); Duino-Aurisina, Italy

Sport
- Sport: Sailing

Janko Kosmina (born 25 June 1935) is a Slovenian sailor. He competed in the Star event at the 1960 Summer Olympics.
