= Steve Juzwik =

American football player (1918–1964)

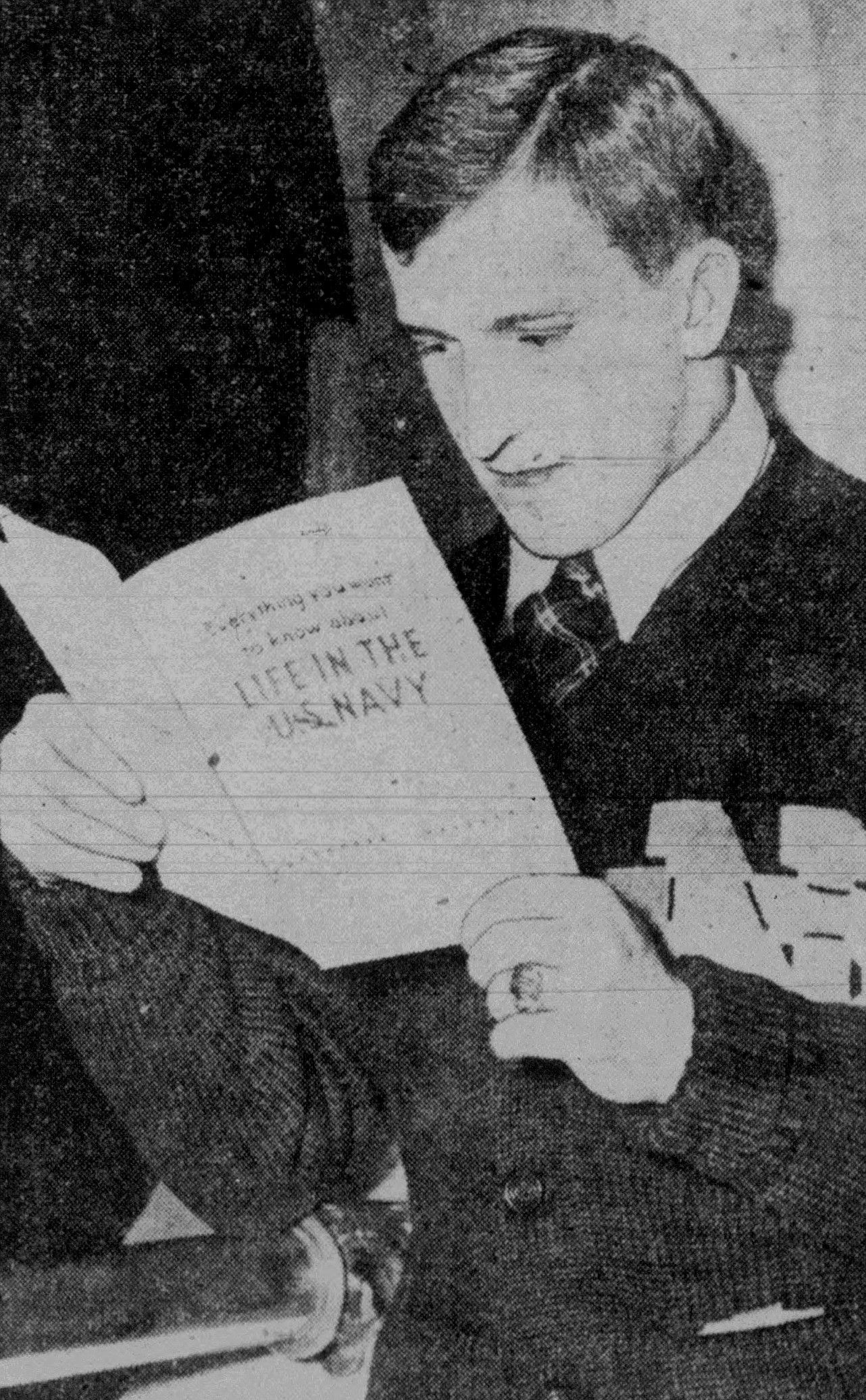
- Juzwik reading Everything you want to know about life in the U.S. Navy at the Chicago, Illinois branch of the United States Navy recruiting office in 1942

No. 30, 88, 81
- Positions: Running back, defensive back

Personal information
- Born: June 18, 1918; Gary, Indiana, U.S.
- Died: June 5, 1964 (aged 45); Chicago, Illinois, U.S.
- Listed height: 5 ft 8 in (1.73 m)
- Listed weight: 186 lb (84 kg)

Career information
- College: Notre Dame (1938–1941)
- NFL draft: 1942: 21st round, 191st overall pick

Career history
- Washington Redskins (1942); Buffalo Bisons/Bills (1946–1947); Chicago Rockets (1948)

Awards and highlights
- NFL champion (1942); Third-team All-American (1940)

Career NFL/AAFC statistics
- Rushing yards: 679
- Rushing average: 5.4
- Receptions: 29
- Receiving yards: 397
- Interceptions: 5
- Total touchdowns: 10
- Stats at Pro Football Reference

Stephen Robert Juzwik (June 18, 1918 – June 5, 1964) was an American professional football running back in the National Football League (NFL) for the Washington Redskins. He also played in the All-America Football Conference (AAFC) for the Buffalo Bisons/Bills and the Chicago Rockets. He played college football at the University of Notre Dame and was selected in the 21st round of the 1942 NFL draft.
