= Windscale Advanced Gas Cooled Reactor =

UK experimental HTR, operated from 1965 to 1976

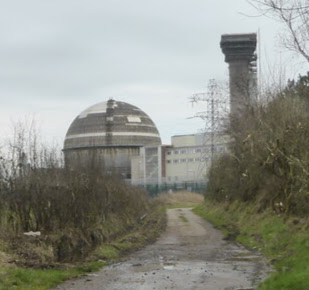
- WAGR containment vessel, on the left, seen in 2014. The chimney on the right is a part of the Windscale Piles
- Reactor concept: Advanced gas-cooled reactor
- Designed by: United Kingdom Atomic Energy Authority
- Operational: 1962 to 1983
- Status: Decommissioning
- Location: Sellafield, England
- Coordinates: 54.4205°N 3.4975°W

Main parameters of the reactor core
- Fuel (fissile material): Low-enriched uranium
- Fuel state: Uranium dioxide (pellets)
- Neutron energy spectrum: Thermal
- Primary control method: Control rods
- Primary moderator: Nuclear graphite
- Primary coolant: Carbon dioxide
- Outlet temperature: 500 °C (932 °F)

Reactor usage
- Primary use: Fuel element testbed
- Power (thermal): 100 MW_{t}
- Power (electric): 30 MW_{e}

The Windscale Advanced Gas Cooled Reactor (WAGR) was a nuclear power plant constructed on the Sellafield nuclear site in Cumbria, England.

== History ==
Commissioned in 1962, the structure was the prototype for the advanced gas-cooled reactor, the United Kingdom's second generation of commercial nuclear reactors.

The station had a rated thermal output of approximately 100 MW and 30 MWe. The WAGR spherical containment, known colloquially as the "golfball", is one of the iconic buildings on the site. Construction was carried out by Mitchell Construction. This reactor was shut down in 1983, and was subsequently the subject of a pilot project to demonstrate techniques for safely decommissioning a nuclear reactor.

== Role ==
While Windscale was described as a 'prototype advanced gas-cooled reactor' by the United Kingdom Atomic Energy Authority, the authors of a British Nuclear Energy Society conference paper state that the reactor was not intended to be a prototype, but rather a test bed for the fuel element of the APG program. The Windscale reactor differed from the commercial reactors in the following aspects:

- reactor scale was much smaller (30 MWe against 600 MWe)
- the reactor pressure vessel was of stainless steel, unlike the prestressed concrete vessels used in the commercial reactors
- the gas temperature, at 500 °C (932 °F), was lower than the commercial design, at 640 °C (1,184 °F)
- the reactor fuel element used 18-pin clusters, unlike the 36-pin clusters used in the commercial reactors

The paper authors state that the Windscale and commercial reactor designs were in fact different in almost every respect.
