= José Ocejo =

Spanish sailor

Personal information
- Nationality: Spanish
- Born: 2 February 1928; Maliaño, Spain

Sport
- Sport: Sailing

José Ocejo (born 2 February 1928, died before 2016) was a Spanish sailor. He competed in the Star event at the 1960 Summer Olympics.
