= Rolf Zachariassen =

Finnish sailor (1935–2024)

Personal information
- Nationality: Finnish
- Born: 27 June 1935; Helsinki, Finland
- Died: 12 September 2024 (aged 89)

Sport
- Sport: Sailing

Rolf Berndt Alexander Zachariassen (27 June 1935 – 12 September 2024) was a Finnish sailor. He competed in the Star event at the 1960 Summer Olympics. Zachariassen died on 12 September 2024, at the age of 89.
