= José Manuel Quina =

Portuguese sailor (born 1934)

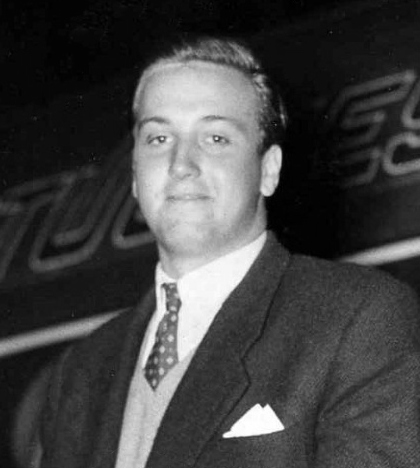
- Quina in 1960

Personal information
- Full name: José Manuel Gentil Quina
- Nationality: Portuguese
- Born: 3 October 1934 (age 91) Campo Grande, Lisbon, Portugal
- Height: 181 cm (5 ft 11 in)
- Weight: 105 kg (231 lb)
Medal record
Men's sailing
Representing Portugal
Olympic Games
Silver medal – second place	1960 Rome	Star

José Manuel Gentil Quina, GOIH (born 3 October 1934) is a former Portuguese sailor. Together with his brother Mário he competed in the star class at the 1960 and 1968 Olympics, and won a silver medal in 1960. At the 1972 Games he placed 11th in one-person dingy.

== Orders ==
- Grand Officer of the Order of Prince Henry
