= Freddy Ehrström =

Finnish sailor (1925–2026)

Personal information
- Full name: Fredrik August Ehrström
- Born: 29 August 1925 Helsinki, Finland
- Died: 21 January 2026 (aged 100) Helsinki, Finland

Sport
- Country: (Finland)
- Sport: Sailing
- Event: 1960 Summer Olympics

Fredrik August Ehrström (29 August 1925 – 21 January 2026) was a Finnish sailor. He competed in the Star event at the 1960 Summer Olympics.

Ehrström also worked as an administrator with the International Sailing Federation and as an international sporting judge.

Ehrström died in Helsinki on 21 January 2026, at the age of 100.
