= Paul Ripard =

Maltese sailor

Personal information
- Nationality: Maltese
- Born: 19 August 1931
- Died: April 2009

Sport
- Sport: Sailing

Paul Ripard (19 August 1931 – April 2009) was a Maltese sailor. He competed in the Star event at the 1960 Summer Olympics.
