= Bumphen Chomvith =

Thai sailor

Personal information
- Nationality: Thai
- Born: 21 February 1922 Uttaradit, Thailand

Sport
- Sport: Sailing

Bumphen Chomvith (born 21 February 1922) was a Thai sailor. He competed in the Star event at the 1960 Summer Olympics.
