= Bill Siderewicz =

American football coach (1936–2023)

William Siderewicz (February 21, 1936 – March 7, 2023) was an American football coach.

== Biography ==
Siderewicz was born on February 21, 1936 Omaha, Nebraska. He graduated from the Arsenal Technical High School in 1954. Later, he attended Ball State University, where he played football and baseball.

Siderewicz started his career with Peru HS as an assistant football coach. From 1964 to 1970, he was the head coach at Rensselaer.

Between 1970 and 1999, Siderewicz was the coach of the Martinsville football team.

In July 1993, Siderewicz was included in the Indiana Football Hall of Fame.

Siderewicz is named in his honor.
