= Nick Klutka =

American football player (1921–2003)

Profile
- Position: End

Personal information
- Born: January 21, 1921; New Brighton, Pennsylvania
- Died: April 2, 2003 (aged 82); Van Wert, Ohio
- Listed height: 5 ft 11 in (1.80 m)
- Listed weight: 198 lb (90 kg)

Career information
- College: Florida

Career history
- Second Air Force Superbombers (1944–1945); Buffalo Bisons (1946)
- Stats at Pro Football Reference

Nicholas Klutka (January 21, 1921 – April 2, 2003) was an American football end. He played for the Florida from 1939 to 1942, the Second Air Force Superbombers in 1944 and 1945, and the Buffalo Bisons in 1946.

== Early life ==
Klutka was born in New Brighton, Pennsylvania, in 1921 and attended New Brighton High School. He played at the tackle position for the New Brighton football team and was captain of the 1938 team.

== College football and military service ==
Klutka enrolled at the University of Florida in the fall of 1939. He played college football for the Florida Gators from 1939 to 1942. He was Florida's starting right tackle during the 1940 season. He was moved to the end position in 1941. At the end position, Klutka was described as the "outstanding star" of the Florida team and was credited with "turning in great work in 'iron man' stunts". He graduated from Florida in May 1943 with a bachelor of arts degree.

After receiving his degree, Klutka joined the United States Army Air Forces during World War II. He played for the 1944 Second Air Force Superbombers football team that was ranked No. 20 in the final AP Poll. He continued to play for the Second Air Force football team in the fall of 1945.

== Professional football ==
In March 1946, he agreed to play for the Buffalo Bisons of the All-America Football Conference. He appeared in 11 games for the Bisons, four as a starter. Klutka played end for the Bisons and also handled placekicking.

== Later life ==
After his playing career ended, Klutia was a high school coach in Van Wert, Ohio. He died in 2003 in Van Wert.
