= Den Danske Pioneer =

U.S. Danish-language newspaper

- Type: Twice-weekly Newspaper
- Format: Broadsheet
- Owner(s): Bertelsen Publishing Co.
- Publisher: Elsa Steffensen
- Editor: Linda Steffensen
- Founded: 1872
- Language: Danish, English
- Headquarters: Hoffman Estates, Illinois
- ISSN: 0747-3869
- OCLC number: 9665848
- Website: www.thedanishpioneer.com

Den Danske Pioneer (The Danish Pioneer) is the oldest Danish-language newspaper published in the United States. Den Danske Pioneer is the last remaining Danish-language newspapers in the United States after the California-based weekly newspaper Bien (Danish for "the bee") ceased publication in 2018.

== History ==
Den Danske Pioneer was founded in 1872 by Mark Hansen. Originally, the newspaper was published in Omaha, Nebraska and 75 percent of its subscribers were Danish-American farmers. Sophus Frederik Neble served as Editor from 1887 to 1931. Sophus Neble was a journeyman printer who had immigrated to the United States in 1883 from Stubbekøbing, Denmark.

Den Danske Pioneer secured a new press at the Chicago Exposition in 1893. The press was capable of printing 6,000 pages an hour. In 1903, the staff of Den Danske Pioneer numbered 16 and the newspaper moved into newly built offices in Omaha. The Pioneer was developing and becoming the voice of the ethnic community. Datelines for stories were spread across the Midwest and journalist were sent as far east as Maine and Vermont in order to get stories.

In 1958 the newspaper relocated to Elmwood Park, Illinois, where it was published until 1984. Hjalmar Bertelsen served as Editor from 1958 until 1981. Queen Margrethe II of Denmark visited the newspaper's Elmwood Park facilities during her visit to the United States in 1976. In 1997, Queen Margrethe II made then-editor Chris Steffensen a Knight of the Order of Dannebrog to commemorate the newspaper's 125th anniversary.

Today the newspaper is a unit of Bertelsen Publishing Co., based in Hoffman Estates, Illinois. Elsa Steffensen, wife of former editor Chris Steffensen, is publisher, and their daughter Linda Steffensen is editor.

== See also ==
- Danes in Omaha, Nebraska

== Other sources ==
- Marzolf, Marion The Danish-Language Press in America (New York: Arno Press. 1979)
