= Mizuki Yamada =

Japanese sailor

Personal information
- Nationality: Japanese
- Born: 12 September 1928; Hokkaido, Japan
- Died: 10 December 2008 (aged 80); Tokyo, Japan

Sport
- Sport: Sailing

Mizuki Yamada (12 September 1928 – 10 December 2008) was a Japanese sailor. He competed in the Star event at the 1960 Summer Olympics.
