= Wilber Brotherton Huston =

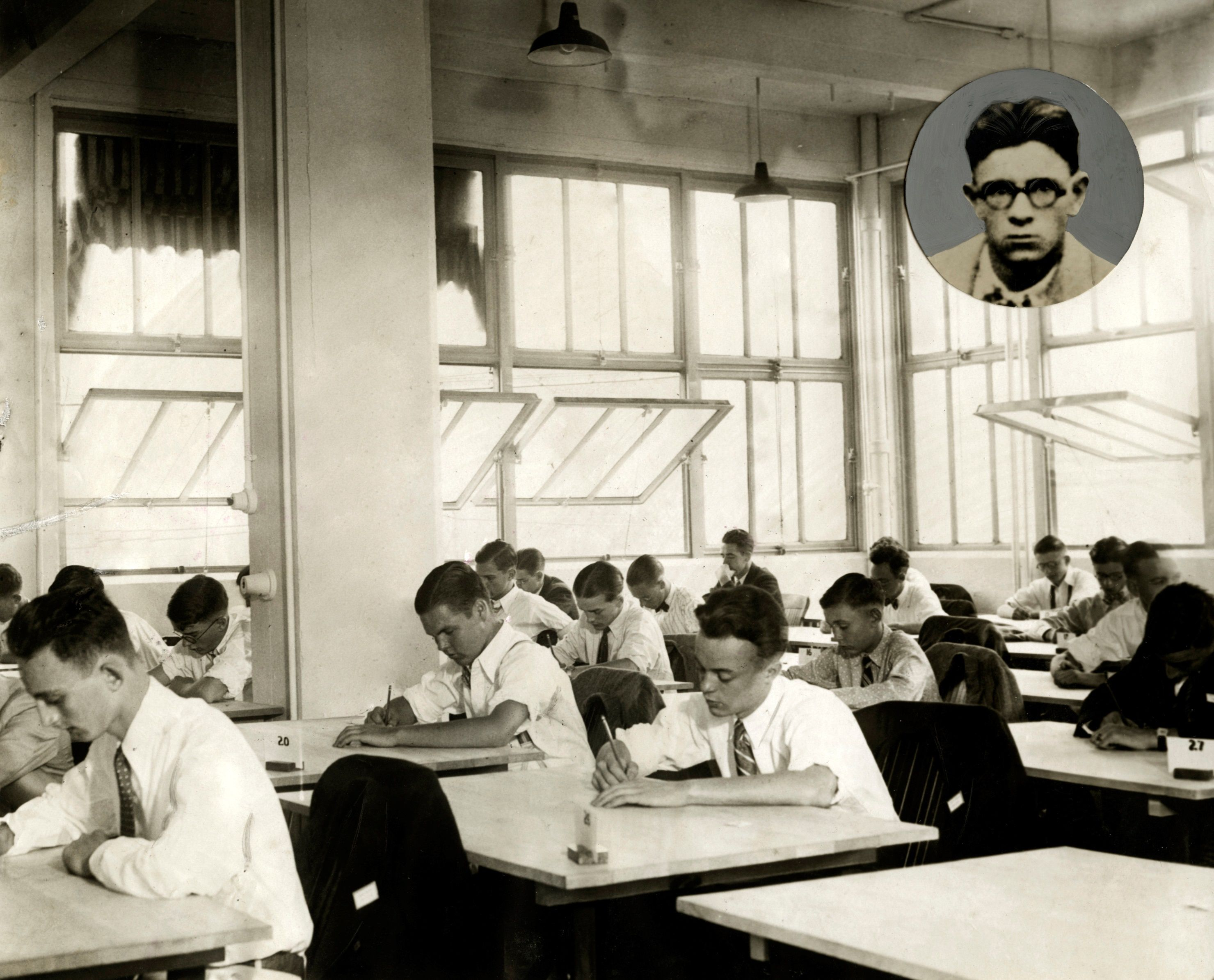
Wilber Huston (inset) among others competing to be Edison's successor

Wilber Brotherton Huston (October 2, 1912 – May 25, 2006) was an American scientist and NASA mission director who coordinated seven satellite launches. He won the first Edison Scholarship Contest at the age of sixteen. Huston died in Fountain Hills, Arizona.
