= Ken Stofer =

American football player (1919–2006)

No. 61, 82
- Positions: Quarterback, defensive back

Personal information
- Born: August 10, 1919; Lakewood, Ohio, U.S.
- Died: May 4, 2006 (aged 86); Westlake, Ohio, U.S.
- Listed height: 5 ft 9 in (1.75 m)
- Listed weight: 188 lb (85 kg)

Career information
- High school: Olmsted Falls
- College: Cornell (1939–1942)

Career history
- Buffalo Bisons (1946)

Career AAFC statistics
- Games played: 11
- Passing attempts: 26
- Passing completions: 9
- Completion percentage: 34.6
- TD–INT: 1–1
- Passing yards: 86
- Passer rating: 41.5
- Rushing yards: 36
- Receptions: 1
- Receiving yards: 14
- Stats at Pro Football Reference

Kenneth Lamont Stofer (August 10, 1919 – May 4, 2006) was an American former professional football quarterback and defensive back who played in the All-America Football Conference (AAFC) with the Buffalo Bisons. He played college football for the Cornell Big Red.

== Early life ==
Stofer was born on August 10, 1919, in Lakewood, Ohio. He attended Olmsted Falls High School in Olmsted Falls, Ohio. Stofer was inducted into the Olmsted Athletic Hall of Fame in 1997.

== College career ==
Stofer played college football for the Cornell Big Red from 1939 to 1942. He was a two-year letterman in 1940 and 1941. In 1941, Stofer was an honorable mention to both the All-Eastern and All-American teams by the AP. On September 22, 1942, he left the team to serve in the United States Army during World War II, having already taken advanced ROTC training at Cornell. Stofer was later inducted into the Cornell Athletics Hall of Fame.

== Professional career ==
On July 18, 1946, Stofer signed with the Buffalo Bisons of the All-America Football Conference (AAFC). He served as the third-string quarterback for much of the season but also saw action at fullback and defensive back. Stofer threw 9 of 26 (34.6%) for 86 yards, one touchdown and one interception. He had 36 rushing yards and one reception for 14 yards as well as 184 return yards. Stofer also punted three times for 108 yards for an average of 36 yards per kick. He was released by the team on March 16, 1947.

== Later life and death ==
After Stofer's playing career ended, he became a manufacturers representative in Ohio, Western Pennsylvania and West Virginia for over 35 years. He married Ruth Ann Scott on August 28, 1948. Stofer was also an avid golfer who served as the historian for the Lakewood Country Club. He died on May 4, 2006, in Westlake, Ohio.
