= Selvin González =

Salvadoran footballer (1981-2006)

Personal information
- Full name: Selvin Hernán González Morán
- Date of birth: 4 July 1981
- Place of birth: El Salvador
- Date of death: 26 May 2006 (aged 24)
- Place of death: Soyapango, El Salvador
- Position: Defender

Senior career*
Years	Team	Apps	(Gls)
2001–2003	Alianza		
2004	Coca Cola		
2004–2005	Once Municipal		
2005–2006	Real San Martín		

International career^{‡}
2003	El Salvador	3	(0)
- * Club domestic league appearances and goals ‡ National team caps and goals as of 4 August 2012

Selvin Hernán González Morán (4 July 1981 - 26 May 2006) was a Salvadoran footballer.

== Club career ==
González played for Salvadoran premier division side Alianza and second division outfits Coca-Cola, Once Municipal and Real San Martín.

== International career ==
Selvin González was part of the Salvadoran 2002 Central American and Caribbean Games gold medal-winning squad. He scored the decisive spot-kick of the penalty shoot-out in the final against Mexico.

He then made his senior debut for El Salvador in a January 2003 friendly match against Guatemala and had earned a total of 3 caps, scoring no goals. His final international was a November 2003 friendly match against Jamaica.

== Death ==
Accompanied by three friends, González was in his girlfriend's house on 26 May 2006, when he was shot by armed men. He died of internal bleeding a few hours later in a medical centre. He was buried in Soyapango on 29 May 2006. Witnesses suspected the attackers to be members of the gang of the Colonia Los Ángeles.

A minute of silence was held before the 2006 Clausura championship final between Águila and FAS, two days after González died.
