= Roy Mitchell (sailor) =

British sailor

Personal information
- Nationality: British
- Born: 6 April 1913; Erith, England
- Died: 27 August 1968 (aged 55); Bourne, England

Sport
- Sport: Sailing

Roy Mitchell (6 April 1913 – 27 August 1968) was a British sailor. He competed with his wife Jean in the Star event at the 1960 Summer Olympics.

John Frederick Roy Mitchell was the eldest son of the civil engineer Frederick Gilbert Mitchell. He succeeded his father as chairman of Mitchell Engineering Ltd. following his father's death in 1962.
