= Jean Mitchell (sailor) =

British sailor

Personal information
- Nationality: British
- Born: 9 July 1912; Dovercourt, England
- Died: 8 May 2006 (aged 93); England

Sport
- Sport: Sailing

Jean Mitchell (9 July 1912 – 8 May 2006) was a British sailor. She competed with her husband Roy in the Star event at the 1960 Summer Olympics.
