= Bien (newspaper) =

Danish language newspaper in the United States

Bien was a Danish-language newspaper published weekly in the United States from the late 19th through the early 21st century.

== History ==
Bien was founded and edited by the Norwegian synod minister I. L. P. Dietrichsen, a pastor in San Francisco, on April 22, 1882. Initially, it had 16 pages, four to six of which were dedicated to pictures, features, and short stories, and about two pages of advertising. In 1890, the newspaper came under Danish management when Danish typographers Sophus Hartwick and Peter Freese became co-editors of the paper. In 1897, Hartwick assumed control of the paper and worked as the chief editor until 1930. During the last decades of the 19th century, the Danish immigrants in the United States had founded 34 Danish-language newspapers and aided in 24 other Danish-Norwegian newspapers. Of those, 15 remained in 1900, including papers such as Den Danske Pioneer, Bikuben, Danskeren, Dannevirke, Bien, Revyen and Nordlyset. After World War II, only Den Danske Pioneer and Bien remained.

Bien was considered the last newspaper in California to be printed using Linotype, switching to computer typesetting in 2001 under the management of Danish resistance movement member Poul Andersen. The last printed issue of Bien was released on May 24, 2018; some digital content beyond that date is archived online.

== Purposes ==
According to the newspaper's former website, Bien was published to serve four fundamental purposes: to provide news from Denmark to keep its readers up to date with people and relevant events there, to inform Danes in America about each other and be the Danish connection between them, to entertain and inform its readers of issues relevant to Danes living in America, and to include contributions from its readers about themselves and their lives and give the readers their own voice.

Bien also served as an outlet for social clubs and local interest groups to gather and organize. Such organizations would notify readers of meetings in the "Foreninger i San Francisco" (Associations in San Francisco) section of Bien, where one could find the times and locations of local Scandinavian related organizations. Groups such as Danske Damers Hjælpeforeninger (the Danish Women's Relief Society), the Danish-American Women's Auxiliary of San Francisco Dannevirke Chapter, and the Danish-American Women's Club all made listings in Bien, noting the various locations at which one interested could become involved in the association.

== Other sources ==
- Marzolf, Marion The Danish-Language Press in America (New York: Arno Press. 1979)
- Nelson, Valerie J. (2006, July 4). Poul Andersen, 84; Published Nation's Only Danish-Language Weekly Paper. The Los Angeles Times
