= JoAnna Lund =

American chef (1944–2006)

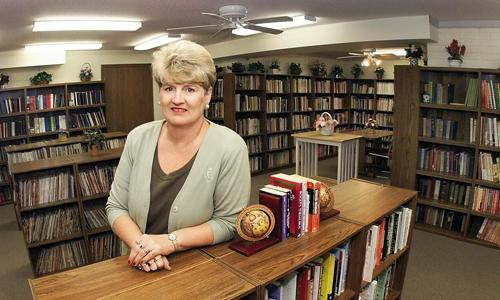
- Born: September 4, 1944; Davenport, Iowa, United States
- Died: May 20, 2006 (aged 61); De Witt, Iowa, U.S.
- Occupations: Author, cook
- Spouses: Daniel Dierickx (m. 1966; div. 1978) Clifford Lund (m. 1979–2006)
- Writing career
- Period: 1991-2006
- Genres: Cooking, recipes
- Subject: Healthy Foods
- Notable work: Healthy Exchanges cookbooks
- Website: www.healthyexchanges.com

JoAnna Margaret Lund (September 4, 1944 – May 20, 2006) was the author of many books, including Healthy Exchanges Cookbook, HELP: Healthy Exchanges Lifetime Plan, and Make a Joyful Table.

== Biography ==
JoAnna McAndrews was born in Davenport, Iowa, September 4, 1944 to Jerome McAndrews and Agnes Carrington. She graduated from Lost Nation High School in Lost Nation, Iowa and from Western Illinois University.

In 1990, her sons James and Tommy, daughter Rebecca, and son-in-law Matthew, were all called to active duty during Operation Desert Storm. The stress of the situation led her to overeat, as well as causing her to consider her own mortality and how her struggles with her weight might impact her family. Realizing that previous diets had never helped her, and that by reclaiming her health she could reclaim her life. In order to do so, she devised a method of "exchanges" that allowed her to eat all the food she loved while exchanging the fats and sugars with healthier choices. As friends asked for more and more of her recipes, she created her first cookbook, The Healthy Exchanges Cookbook.

Re-published by G. P. Putnam's Sons in 1993, it has since sold hundreds of thousands of copies. The cookbook jumpstarted Lund's career. The former self-proclaimed "diet queen" from DeWitt, Iowa authored several books, as well as founding Healthy Exchanges, Inc., a company that published a monthly newsletter with a subscriber base of 15,000, motivational booklets, along with inspirational audio and video tapes. According to People Magazine, the company was a $1 million enterprise that employed up to 30 people.

After starting her business, Lund became a nationally known spokeswoman for healthier eating. She was elected to represent Iowa at President Clinton's White House Council on Small Business in 1995. During that same year, Governor Brandstad, appointed her to serve on the Iowa Rural Health & Primary Care Commission.

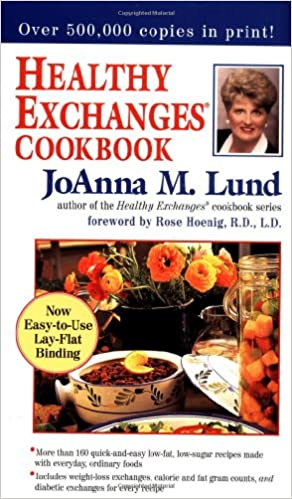

She hosted a weekly radio show on WOC Radio in DeWitt and was featured in national publications such as The New York Times, People and Forbes. She has been interviewed on hundreds of regional television and radio shows, and is one of the top-selling cookbook authors on the television shopping channel, QVC Shopping network. During one hour-long appearance on QVC, she sold almost 200,000 books. In January 1997, she launched her own cooking show on PBS-TV, JoAnna Lund's HELP Yourself.

Lund was a member of the International Association of Culinary Professionals; Society for Nutrition Education; National Federation of Press Women; Association of Food Journalists; Mid-America Publishers Association; National Association of Independent Publishers; Publishers Marketing Association; and the International Association of Independent Publishers. She was a recipient of a Certificate of Nomination as Inc. Magazine's Entrepreneur of the Year from Iowa for 1993–95. She worked as a commercial insurance underwriter for 18 years before starting Healthy Exchanges.

Lund appeared on CNN and the Home Shopping Club and wrote numerous cookbooks.

Lund sold the most books on QVC, up to the time of her death in May 2006.

== Death and legacy ==
JoAnna Lund died of inflammatory breast cancer on May 20, 2006, aged 61. She had given control of Healthy Exchanges to friends and family, and had asked that it continue after her death through books and the newsletter, stating, “ I have enough recipes created, but not shared, to last for 20 more years - if not longer.” Additionally, Lund made a final request of her readers: “Every day you rise to face another tomorrow, I want you to think of me and recite one of my favorites, Psalms (118:24). ‘This is the day the Lord has made! Let us rejoice and be glad in it!’”
