= Emilio Gurruchaga =

Spanish sailor

Personal information
- Nationality: Spanish
- Born: 2 July 1934; San Sebastián, Spain
- Died: 5 May 2021 (aged 86); San Sebastián

Sport
- Sport: Sailing

Emilio Gurruchaga (2 July 1934 – 5 May 2021) was a Spanish sailor. He competed in the Star event at the 1960 Summer Olympics.
