= Indiana Football Hall of Fame =

Coordinates: 39°49′49″N 84°53′26″W

The Indiana Football Hall of Fame is a sports museum and hall of fame in Richmond, Indiana. It honors persons associated with high school, college and professional American football in Indiana. It also works to establish scholarships and endowments to promote football in the state of Indiana. The hall was founded in 1973 as an affiliate of the Indiana Football Coaches Association.

The museum was housed in a historic post office building at the corner of North 9th and A Streets. The physical museum permanently closed in 2021.

== Inductees ==
- 1993: Bill Siderewicz
- 2014: Mike Alstott
- Kyle Orton
- 2024: Mike Fulk
