= Poul Andersen (resistance member) =

Danish printer

- Born: Poul Dalby Andersen; April 19, 1922; Ringkøbing, Denmark
- Died: May 29, 2006 (aged 84); Los Angeles, California, United States
- Occupation(s): Danish resistance member, printer, newspaper publisher

Poul Dalby Andersen (April 19, 1922 – May 29, 2006) was a printer who served in the Danish resistance movement during World War II and later published one of the remaining two Danish-language newspapers in the United States.

== Background ==
Andersen was born in Ringkøbing, a small town in Ringkøbing-Skjern municipality on the west coast of Denmark. His grandfather was a co-founder of the town's daily newspaper. Andersen's father was a typesetter, and Andersen learned the printing trade in the newspaper's offices. Andersen came to the United States in 1949 and worked on an uncle's farm in Ohio. A friend encouraged him to move to Santa Monica, California. In 1950 Andersen was hired by the Los Angeles Times as a printer.

== Career ==
Andersen was a conversationalist and a soccer fanatic, two traits that helped him as a member of the Danish resistance.

"My husband was a chatterbox, and he loved soccer, so he could bicycle down to a neighboring town to play soccer and the Germans would never think twice about it," Judy Andersen told the Los Angeles Times. "He would ask the guards, 'What are they doing in the field there?' and learn that [the Germans] were building gun emplacements."

In 1975 Andersen bought Bien, a San Francisco-based Danish-language newspaper. Andersen moved the newspaper to Burbank, California, to allow him to work on the paper after completing his shift at the Times. Bien's circulation reached a high of 5,300 during Andersen's tenure as publisher.

Andersen continued to use a Linotype machine to set the type for each edition of Bien long after other newspapers had switched to computerized typesetting. In 1997 the California Newspaper Publishers Association said Bien was probably the last newspaper in California being printed with Linotype.

Andersen was knighted in 1982 by Queen Margrethe II of Denmark for his efforts in uniting the Danish American community. Andersen died in Los Angeles from complications of Alzheimer's disease.
