= Alfredo Del Francia =

Italian fencer (1944–2006)

Personal information
- Born: 7 June 1944 Rome, Italy
- Died: 9 May 2006 (aged 61)

Sport
- Sport: Fencing

Alfredo Del Francia (7 June 1944 – 9 May 2006) was an Italian fencer. He competed in the team foil events at the 1968 and 1972 Summer Olympics.
