= Judith Moore =

American author and essayist (1940–2006)

- Born: 1940; Oklahoma, U.S.
- Died: May 15, 2006 (aged 65–66); Berkeley, California
- Occupations: Journalist, essayist
- Writing career
- Genres: book reviews, memoir

Judith Moore (1940 – May 15, 2006) was an American author and essayist best known for her 2005 book Fat Girl: A True Story, published by Hudson Street Press.

== Biography ==
Moore was born in Oklahoma in 1940 and claimed to have become an obese child, weighing 112 pounds by second grade (); Fat Girl is a memoir of her childhood.

She moved to Florida as a teenager and graduated from The Evergreen State College in Olympia, Washington. She married and divorced twice, having two daughters.

For much of her adult life she lived in Berkeley, California. While living there in the early 1980s, Moore began to submit freelance book reviews and essays to weekly newspapers in the area, most frequently to the East Bay Express. She collected these pieces and published them in 1987 (under the SoHo Press imprint) as The Left Coast of Paradise: California and the American Heart. The book included interviews with Herbert Marcuse and novelist Leonard Michaels. Moore published a second book, Never Eat Your Heart Out, in 1998 (North Point Press, an imprint of Farrar Straus and Giroux). This book was about the relationship between food and her life.

From the mid-1980s onward, she wrote mostly for the San Diego Reader, a weekly publication where she sometimes served, somewhat controversially, as editor. She specialized in book reviews (especially food writing) and offbeat, whimsical feature subjects. Once she visited a San Diego sausage factory and described it in lurid detail, in order to test the cliché that no one wanted to see sausage being made.

In May 2006, Moore died of colon cancer after three years of treatment.

== Sources ==
- San Jose Mercury News, "Essayist Judith Moore Dies in Berkeley" |May 29 2006 [Dead Link]
- Contemporary Authors Online, Gale, 2006. Reproduced in Biography Resource Center. Farmington Hills, Mich.: Thomson Gale. 2006. Accessed May 29, 2006
