= Juan Ramón Salgado =

Honduran politician

Juan Ramón Salgado Cuevas (1961-2 May 2006) was a Liberal politician from Honduras. He was fatally shot by multiple unknown gunman in San Pedro Sula.

Salgado served as the deputy leader of the governing Liberal Party and was also the mayor of Trujillo.
