= Samuel Félix =

Mexican modern pentathlete

Personal information
- Born: Samuel Félix Miranda; 8 February 1977 Cubiri de la Loma, Sinaloa Municipality, Sinaloa, Mexico
- Died: 30 May 2006 (aged 29) Bakersfield, California, United States
- Height: 1.72 m (5 ft 7 1/2 in)
- Weight: 63 kg (139 lb)

Sport
- Country: Mexico
- Sport: Modern pentathlon
- Club: Edo

Samuel Félix Miranda (8 February 1977 – 30 May 2006) was a Mexican sportsman who competed in the Modern pentathlon at the 2000 Summer Olympics in Sydney.

== Biography ==
Félix came from Sinaloa and first started competing at the age of 14. Two elder siblings were also pentathletes, most notably his brother Alberto Félix, a Mexican representative at 1992 Summer Olympics. His first international event came in 1994 and he went on to compete at Pan American and World Championships level, culminating in his only appearance at the Olympic Games.

At the 2000 Summer Olympics, Félix was one of the 24 competitors that took part in the men's modern pentathlon. He finished in 11th position overall with 5165 points. His best performing discipline was the 3 km cross country run, in which he finished third with a time of 9:17.66.

=== Murder ===
Félix was shot following an altercation at his residence on Williams Street in Lamont, California on the night of 30 May 2006. According to the Kern County Sheriff's Department, he had been involved in an argument outside his apartment with a male described as being around 19 years old. During the confrontation, Félix was brandishing a large stick. Once the assailant pulled out a handgun, Félix ran into his apartment for protection and deadbolted the door, however the assailant was able to open the door enough to fire two shots inside. One of those shots hit Félix in the back. He died of his injuries an hour later at the Kern Medical Center in Bakersfield.
