= Sailing at the 1960 Summer Olympics – Star =

Sailing at the Olympics

Star at the Games of the XVII Olympiad
- Olympic Configuration 1960
- Venue: Naples
- Competitors: 53 from 26 nations
- Teams: 26

Medalists
1st place, gold medalist(s)		Timir Pinegin; Fyodor Shutkov	Soviet Union
2nd place, silver medalist(s)		Mario G. Quina; Josè Manuel Gentil Quina	Portugal
3rd place, bronze medalist(s)		William W. Parks; Robert Sherman Halperin	United States

The Star was a sailing event on the Sailing at the 1960 Summer Olympics program in Naples. Seven races were scheduled. 53 sailors, on 26 boats, from 26 nations competed.

== Results ==
Results of individual races
Pos	Sail no.	Boat name	Crew	Country	I		II		III		IV		V		VI		VII		Tot	Pts
Pos	Sail no.	Boat name	Crew	Country	Pos	Pts	Pos	Pts	Pos	Pts	Pos	Pts	Pos	Pts	Pos	Pts	Pos	Pts	Tot	Pts
Gold medal	SR–3802	Tornado	Timir Pinegin; Fyodor Shutkov	Soviet Union	1	1516	2	1215	1	1516	1	1516	3	1039	5	817^{†}	5	817	8436	7619
Silver medal	P–3954	Ma' Lindo	Mário Quina; José Manuel Quina	Portugal	3	1039	3	1039	8	613^{†}	2	1215	5	817	1	1516	3	1039	7278	6665
Bronze medal	US–3871	Shrew II	William W. Parks; Robert Sherman Halperin	United States	9	562^{†}	7	671	4	914	3	1039	2	1215	4	914	1	1516	6831	6269
4	I–3810	Merope III	Agostino Straulino; Carlo Rolandi	Italy	4	914	4	914	5	817	10	516^{†}	1	1516	2	1215	7	671	6563	6047
5	Z–4099	Ali Babà VI	Hans Bryner; Urs-Ulrich Bucher	Switzerland	6	738^{†}	5	817	2	1215	5	817	4	914	6	738	2	1215	6454	5716
6	BA–4262	Gem VII	Durward Knowles; Sloane E. Farrington	Bahamas	11	475^{†}	1	1516	3	1039	14	370	11	475	3	1039	6	738	5652	5282
7	G–4254	Bellatrix IX	Bruno Splieth; Eckart Wagner, Karsten Meyer	United Team of Germany	2	1215	9	562	13	402	4	914	6	738	DNF	101^{†}	4	914	4846	4745
8	Y–4058	Cha-Cha III	Mario Fafangel; Janko Kosmina	Yugoslavia	7	671	6	738	14	370^{†}	8	613	7	671	7	671	8	613	4347	3977
9	BL–4077	Pimm	Jorge Pontual; Cid Nascimento	Brazil	10	516	13	402^{†}	9	562	6	738	8	613	11	475	9	562	3868	3466
10	S–3883	Mari	Sune Carlsson; Per-Olof Karlsson	Sweden	8	613	8	613	12	437^{†}	11	475	10	516	9	562	12	437	3653	3216
11	F–3898	Frip IV	Georges Pisani; Noël Desaubliaux	France	21	194^{†}	12	437	7	671	12	437	12	437	8	613	10	516	3305	3111
12	M–4282	Olimpia	István Telegdy; István Jutasi	Hungary	12	437	15	340^{†}	6	738	7	671	13	402	15	340	11	475	3403	3063
13	RC–3792	Vesania	Jorge de Cárdenas; Carlos de Cárdenas Jr.	Cuba	15	340	11	475	11	475	18	261	9	562	DNF^{†}	101^{†}	16	312	2526	2425
14	L–3675	Bellatrix IX	Freddy Ehrström; Rolf Zachariassen	Finland	5	817	16	312	10	516	DNF	101^{†}	22	174	DNF	101	15	340	2361	2260
15	OE–4194	May-Be 1960	Harald Musil; Franz Eisl	Austria	14	370	10	516	15	340	9	562	20	215	DNF	101^{†}	19	237	2341	2240
16	MX–4294	Chamukina	Carlos Braniff; Mauricio de la Lama	Mexico	19	237	17	286	19	237	22	174^{†}	17	286	12	437	13	402	2059	1885
17	A–3701	Mizar	Roberto C. Mieres; Víctor Fragola	Argentina	17	286	22	174	17	286	23	154^{†}	14	370	14	370	18	261	1901	1747
18	KA–4196	Pakaria	Robert French; Jack Downey	Australia	13	402	21	194^{†}	20	215	21	194	21	194	10	516	20	215	1930	1736
19	TH–4163	Siames-Cat	Prince Bira Bhanubanda; Bumphen Chomvith	Thailand	22	174^{†}	14	370	21	194	16	312	19	237	20	215	17	286	1788	1614
20	GE–4228	Zefyros	Nicolaos Vlangalis; Spyros Makridakis	Greece	18	261	19	237	18	261	25	118^{†}	15	340	17	286	21	194	1697	1579
21	V–3929	Espuma del Mar	Daniel Camejo; Peter Camejo	Venezuela	23	154^{†}	23	154	23	154	15	340	18	261	13	402	22	174	1639	1485
22	E–4084	Pasodoble	José Ocejo; Emilio Gurruchaga	Spain	20	215	24	136^{†}	22	174	17	286	16	312	16	312	23	154	1589	1453
23	KC–3298	Scram	William Burgess; William West	Canada	25	118^{†}	25	118	16	312	13	402	24	136	21	194	24	136	1416	1298
24	K–4253	Twinkle	Roy Mitchell; Jean Mitchell	Great Britain	16	312	18	261	26	101^{†}	19	237	25	118	19	237	25	118	1384	1283
25	KM–2958	Merope	Paul Ripard; John Ripard	Malta	24	136	20	215	24	136	20	215	DSQ	0^{†}	DNF	101	14	370	1173	1173
26	J–3457	Danaldo	Mizuki Yamada; Yoshimatsu Sakaibara	Japan	26	101^{†}	26	101	25	118	24	136	23	154	18	261	26	101	972	871

Legend: DNF – Did not finish; DNS – Did not start; DSQ – Disqualified; † – Discarded race not counted in the overall result;
Gender: – male; – female;

=== Daily standings ===
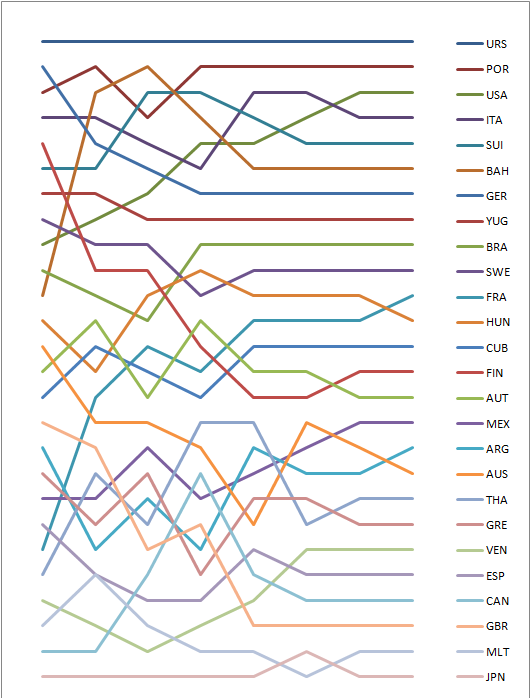
Graph showing the daily standings in the Star during the 1960 Summer Olympics

== Conditions at Naples ==
Of the total of three race areas were needed during the Olympics in Naples. Each of the classes was using the same scoring system. The center course was used for the Star.

Date	Race	Sea	Wind direction	Wind speed (m/s)
29 August 1960	I	Calm	SSW	4-5
30 August 1960	II	Calm	SW	3
31 August 1960	III	Slightly rough	W	6-8
1 September 1960	IV	Calm	SSW	3-4
5 September 1960	V	Calm	SSW	6-7
6 September 1960	VI	Sea force two	WSW	4-5
7 September 1960	VII	Sea force 1	WSW	6-7
