= Firmin De Coster =

Belgian footballer

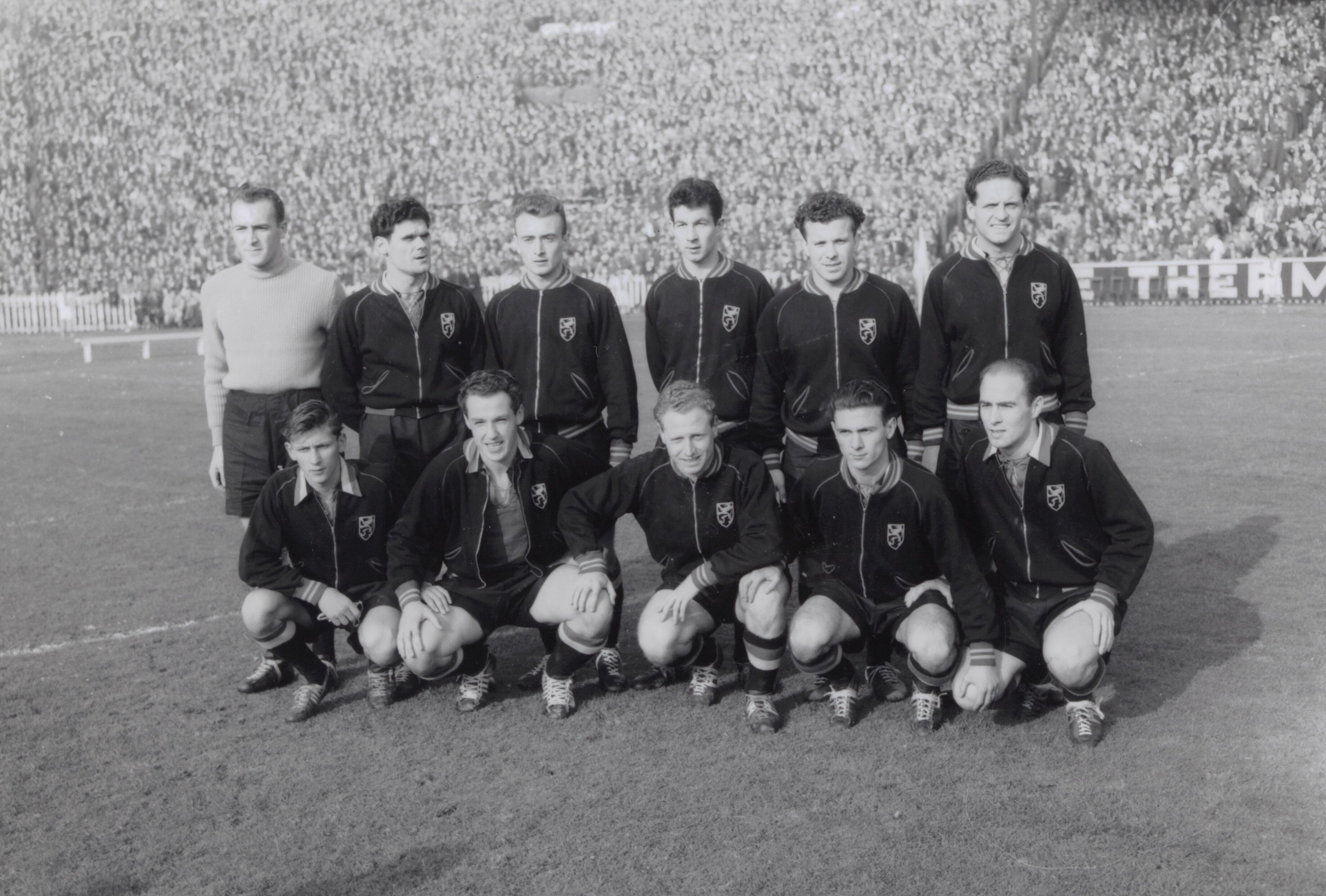
- De Coster with the Belgian team (1956)

Personal information
- Date of birth: 25 June 1930
- Date of death: 17 May 2006 (aged 75)

International career
Years	Team	Apps	(Gls)
1956	Belgium	1	(0)

Firmin De Coster (25 June 1930 – 17 May 2006) was a Belgian footballer. He played in one match for the Belgium national football team in 1956.
