= 1953 Baltimore Colts season =

Inaugural season for the current Colts franchise

- Owner: Carroll Rosenbloom (primary)
- General manager: Don "Red" Kellett
- Head coach: Keith Molesworth
- Home stadium: Memorial Stadium

Results
- Record: 3–9
- Division place: 5th NFL Western
- Playoffs: Did not qualify

The 1953 Baltimore Colts season was the first season for the second Colts franchise as a member club of the National Football League (NFL). The Colts had a record of 3 wins and 9 losses and finished fifth in the Western Conference for the year. The team relocated from Dallas, where they had played as the Dallas Texans.

== Background ==
The Baltimore Colts of the All-America Football Conference (AAFC) were one of three teams merged with the NFL in 1950, despite having suffered a woeful 1–11 season in 1949. Adding complexity to the prospects of a team with an obvious talent shortage, as the odd 13th team in the league the Colts were given a round-robin schedule in 1950, meeting every team but the Chicago Bears one time and allowed a standard home-and-away relationship only with the neighboring Washington Redskins.

A predictable debacle ensued, with the Colts again going 1–11 in 1950. Amidst a sea of red ink, the original AAFC Colts shut down operations, with the team's players distributed to the other 12 teams of the league via the 1951 NFL draft.

There would be no professional football in Baltimore during the 1951 and 1952 seasons.

With the original Dallas Texans franchise a major financial failure in their one and only season in Dallas, by the end of 1952 it became clear that a new 12th team would be needed by the NFL. On December 8, 1952, a drive to "Bring Back the Colts" was launched in Baltimore, with headquarters located at Baltimore Memorial Stadium. Doors were thrown open at 9 am and by midnight more than $25,000 towards the purchase of season tickets was pledged. This amount was matched on Day 2 and again on Day 3; at the end of six weeks more than $300,000 for 15,0000 season tickets was pledged, with over 99% of this figure ultimately collected.

This show of enthusiasm drew attention around the country and proved decisive. In January 1953, a Baltimore-based group led by Carroll Rosenbloom won the rights to a new Baltimore franchise to begin play later that year.

Rosenbloom's group was awarded the remains of the Texans organization, including the rights to its players. Among these players were future Hall of Fame defensive linemen Gino Marchetti and Art Donovan, who would comprise a nucleus for the new Colts franchise. Rosenbloom chose the blue and white color scheme used by the original Dallas Texans, while appropriating the bucking-horse-with-football logo used by the original AAFC Baltimore Colts franchise.

Despite using the Texans' colors and many of their players, the Colts did not and never have reckoned themselves as a continuation of the Texans franchise or their predecessors, the Boston/New York Yanks/Bulldogs. Likewise, the NFL reckons the Colts as a 1953 expansion team.

== Season highlights ==
In the season opener against the Chicago Bears on September 27, Colts' defensive back Bert Rechichar set an NFL record for the longest field goal (56 yards), breaking the previous unofficial record of 55 yards (set by drop kick by Paddy Driscoll in 1924). It stood for over seventeen years, until Tom Dempsey booted a 63-yarder in 1970.

The Colts opened the season strong, winning 3 of their first 5 contests — including two against the venerable Bears and a home win over neighboring Washington — before going into a tailspin in which they racked up 7 consecutive losses.

The 1953 Colts have the unusual distinction of having a losing record, despite having a league-leading 56 defensive takeaways.

== Offseason ==
=== Draft ===
1953 Baltimore Colts draft
Round	Pick	Player	Position	College	Notes
1	2	Billy Vessels	HB	Oklahoma	1952 Heisman Trophy winner; signed with Edmonton Eskimos (WIFL). Joined Colts in 1956.
2	14	Bernie Flowers	E	Purdue	signed with Ottawa Rough Riders (IRFU)
3	26	Buck McPhail	FB	Oklahoma	
4	39	Tom Catlin	LB	Oklahoma	
5	51	Jack Little	T	Texas A&M	
6	63	Jim Sears	DB	USC	
7	75	Bill Athey	G	Baylor	
8	87	Jim Prewett	T	Tulsa	
9	99	Bob Blair	E	TCU	
10	111	John Cole	B	Arkansas	
11	123	Gene Rossi	B	Cincinnati	
12	135	Kaye Vaughan	G	Tulsa	Signed with Ottawa Rough Riders (IRFU)
13	147	Bobby Moorhead	B	Georgia Tech	
14	159	Frank Continetti	G	George Washington	
15	171	Buddy Sutton	B	Arkansas	
16	183	Jim Currin	E	Dayton	
17	195	George Rambour	T	Dartmouth	
18	207	LeRoy Labat	B	LSU	
19	219	Bill Powell	B	California	
20	231	Pete Russo	T	Indiana	
21	243	Frank Kirby	T	Bucknell	
22	255	Merlin Gish	C	Kansas	
23	267	Mike Housepian	G	Tulane	
24	279	Monte Brethauer	DB	Oregon	
25	291	Joe Szombathy	E	Syracuse	
26	303	Scott Prescott	C	Minnesota	
27	315	Ray Graves	B	Texas A&M	
28	327	Joe Sabol	B	UCLA	
29	339	Jack Alessandrini	G	Notre Dame	
30	351	Tom Roche	T	Northwestern	
Made roster

== Regular season ==
=== Schedule ===
Game	Date	Opponent	Result	Record	Venue	Attendance	Recap	Sources
1	September 27	**Chicago Bears**	**W** 13–9	1–0	Memorial Stadium	23,715	Recap	
2	October 3	**Detroit Lions**	**L** 17–27	1–1	Memorial Stadium	25,159	Recap	
3	October 11	at **Chicago Bears**	**W** 16–14	2–1	Wrigley Field	35,316	Recap	
4	October 18	at **Green Bay Packers**	**L** 14–37	2–2	City Stadium	18,713	Recap	
5	October 25	Washington Redskins	**W** 27–17	3–2	Memorial Stadium	34,031	Recap	
6	October 31	**Green Bay Packers**	**L** 24–35	3–3	Memorial Stadium	33,797	Recap	
7	November 7	at **Detroit Lions**	**L** 7–17	3–4	Tiger Stadium	46,508	Recap	
8	November 15	at Philadelphia Eagles	**L** 14–45	3–5	Shibe Park	27,813	Recap	
9	November 22	**Los Angeles Rams**	**L** 13–21	3–6	Memorial Stadium	27,268	Recap	
10	November 29	**San Francisco 49ers**	**L** 21–38	3–7	Memorial Stadium	26,005	Recap	
11	December 5	at **Los Angeles Rams**	**L** 2–45	3–8	L.A. Memorial Coliseum	26,696	Recap	
12	December 13	at **San Francisco 49ers**	**L** 14–45	3–9	Kezar Stadium	23,432	Recap	
Note: Intra-conference opponents are in **bold** text.

=== Standings ===
NFL Western Conference
	W	L	T	PCT	CONF	PF	PA	STK
Detroit Lions	10	2	0	.833	8–2	271	205	W6
San Francisco 49ers	9	3	0	.750	8–2	372	237	W4
Los Angeles Rams	8	3	1	.727	7–3	366	236	W2
Chicago Bears	3	8	1	.273	2–7–1	218	262	L2
Baltimore Colts	3	9	0	.250	2–8	182	350	L7
Green Bay Packers	2	9	1	.182	2–7–1	200	338	L5

Note: Tie games were not officially counted in the standings until 1972.

== Coaching staff ==
- Head coach: Keith Molesworth
- Backfield coach: Nick Wasylik
- Line coach: Ray Richards
- Assistant Line coach and trainer: Otis Douglas

== Roster ==
Official team photo of the 1953 Baltimore Colts.

1953 Baltimore Colts final roster
Quarterbacks: 19 Jack Del Bello; 18 Dick Flowers; Running backs: 38 John Huzvar; 31 Buck McPhail; 20 George Taliaferro P/QB; 22 Buddy Young; Receivers: 86 Monte Brethauer FS; 82 Dan Edwards; 85 Mel Embree	Offensive linemen: 61 Dick Barwegen C; 68 Ernie Blandin T; 73 Joe Campanella; 50 Brad Ecklund C; 74 Ken Jackson G/T; 66 Bill Lange G; 72 Jack Little T; 75 Gino Marchetti T; Defensive linemen: 60 Sisto Averno MG; 70 Art Donovan DT; 77 Tom Finnin DT; 83 Barney Poole DE; 81 Art Spinney DE; 84 Elmer Wingate DE; 76 Jim Winkler DT/MG	Linebackers: 62 Alex Agase; 65 Bill Pellington; 64 Ed Sharkey; Defensive backs: 24 Larry Coutre CB; 21 Tom Keane SS/P; 26 Ed Mioduszewski CB/QB; 44 Bert Rechichar FS/WR/K; 25 Don Shula CB; 23 Carl Taseff CB/FS	Reserve list: 10 Fred Enke QB (IR); 40 Tommy Kalmanir RB (IR); 52 Zollie Toth RB (IR); ---- Dick Wilkins WR (Military); rookies in italics

== See also ==
- History of the Indianapolis Colts
- List of Indianapolis Colts seasons
