= 1953 Detroit Lions season =

NFL team season (won NFL Championship)

- Head coach: Buddy Parker
- Home stadium: Briggs Stadium

Results
- Record: 10–2
- Division place: 1st NFL Western
- Playoffs: Won NFL Championship (vs. Browns) 17–16
- All-Pros: 5: MG Les Bingaman; S Jack Christiansen; OG Lou Creekmur; OG Dick Stanfel; HB Doak Walker
- Pro Bowlers: 7: MG Les Bingaman S Jack Christiansen OG Lou Creekmur S Yale Lary QB Bobby Layne OG Dick Stanfel HB Doak Walker

The 1953 Detroit Lions season was the franchise's 24th season in the National Football League. The Lions won their second consecutive and third overall National Football League (NFL) championship. In their fourth year under head coach Buddy Parker, the Lions compiled a 10–2 record during the regular season, outscored opponents 271 to 205, finished in first place in the NFL's Western Division, and defeated the Cleveland Browns 17–16 in the NFL Championship Game at Briggs Stadium in Detroit.

The 1953 Lions ranked fifth in the NFL in scoring offense. The offense was led by quarterback Bobby Layne who compiled 2,431 yards of total offense (2,088 passing, 343 rushing) and 16 passing touchdowns. Halfback Doak Walker totaled 839 yards from scrimmage, (337 rushing, 502 receiving) and was the team's leading scorer with 93 points on five touchdowns, 12 field goals, and 27 extra points. For the fourth year in a row, Bob Hoernschemeyer was the team's leading rusher, contributed 764 yards from scrimmage (482 rushing, 282 receiving) and scored nine touchdowns.

The team also ranked second in the NFL in scoring defense. Defensive back Jack Christiansen led the NFL with 12 interceptions and 238 interception return yards. Eight members of the 1953 Lions were selected as first-team All-NFL players for the 1953 season: middle guard Les Bingaman, Christiansen, offensive guard Lou Creekmur, Hoernschemeyer, Layne, defensive tackle Thurman McGraw, guard Dick Stanfel, and Walker. Seven members of the team, Christiansen, Creekmur, safety Yale Lary, Layne, linebacker Joe Schmidt, guard Dick Stanfel, and Walker, were later inducted into the Pro Football Hall of Fame.

== Regular season ==
According to the team, a total of 21,606 season tickets were sold by the Lions for the 1953 campaign. The Lions played their home games in Briggs Stadium (Tiger Stadium), which had a regular listed seating capacity of 46,194, with an additional 7,000 bleacher seats for football to bring total capacity to 53,194.

=== Schedule ===
Week	Date	Opponent	Result	Record	Venue	Attendance
1	September 27	Pittsburgh Steelers	W 38–21	1–0	Briggs Stadium	44,587
2	October 3	at Baltimore Colts	W 27–17	2–0	Memorial Stadium	25,159
3	October 11	San Francisco 49ers	W 24–21	3–0	Briggs Stadium	58,079
4	October 18	Los Angeles Rams	L 19–31	3–1	Briggs Stadium	55,772
5	October 25	at San Francisco 49ers	W 14–10	4–1	Kezar Stadium	54,662
6	November 1	at Los Angeles Rams	L 24–37	4–2	Los Angeles Memorial Coliseum	93,751
7	November 7	Baltimore Colts	W 17–7	5–2	Briggs Stadium	46,208
8	November 15	at Green Bay Packers	W 14–7	6–2	City Stadium	20,834
9	November 22	at Chicago Bears	W 20–16	7–2	Wrigley Field	36,165
10	November 26	Green Bay Packers	W 34–15	8–2	Briggs Stadium	52,547
11	December 6	Chicago Bears	W 13–7	9–2	Briggs Stadium	58,056
12	December 13	at New York Giants	W 27–16	10–2	Yankee Stadium	28,390

- Saturday night (October 3, November 7), Thursday (November 26: Thanksgiving)

== Standings ==
NFL Western Conference
	W	L	T	PCT	CONF	PF	PA	STK
Detroit Lions	10	2	0	.833	8–2	271	205	W6
San Francisco 49ers	9	3	0	.750	8–2	372	237	W4
Los Angeles Rams	8	3	1	.727	7–3	366	236	W2
Chicago Bears	3	8	1	.273	2–7–1	218	262	L2
Baltimore Colts	3	9	0	.250	2–8	182	350	L7
Green Bay Packers	2	9	1	.182	2–7–1	200	338	L5

Note: Tie games were not officially counted in the standings until 1972.

== Postseason ==
Round	Date	Opponent	Result	Record	Venue	Attendance
Championship	December 27	Cleveland Browns	W 17–16	1–0	Briggs Stadium	54,577

== Roster ==
1953 Detroit Lions roster
Quarterbacks (QB): 19 Tom Dublinski; 22 Bobby Layne; Running backs (RB): 33 Ollie Cline; 26 Gene Gedman; 23 Jug Girard; 14 Bob Hoernschemeyer; 36 Bob Smith; 37 Doak Walker; Wide receivers (WR): 80 Cloyce Box; 87 Dorne Dibble; 82 Leon Hart; Tight ends (TE)	Offensive linemen (OL): 50 Charlie Ane T/C; 51 Vince Banonis C; 76 Lou Creekmur T/G/MG; 66 Harley Sewell G; 78 Ollie Spencer T; 63 Dick Stanfel G; Defensive linemen (DL): 65 Les Bingaman MG/G; 88 Jim Cain DE; 83 Jim Doran DE/WR; 85 Sonny Gandee DE; 73 Thurman McGraw DT; 74 Bob Miller DT/T; 75 John Prchlik DT	Linebackers (LB): 62 Jim Martin K/G; 56 Joe Schmidt; 53 LaVern Torgeson; Defensive backs (DB): 32 Lew Carpenter RB; 21 Carl Karilivacz CB/S; 24 Jack Christiansen S; 25 Jim David CB; 28 Yale Lary S/P; 40 Bob Smith CB/P; Special teams (ST)	Reserve: -- Stan Campbell G (Military); -- Gordon Cooper WR (Military); 42 Bob Dove DE (IR); 86 Blaine Earon DE (IR); 84 Gil Mains DE (IR); Rookies in italics

== Season summary ==
=== Week 1: Pittsburgh ===
Team	1	2	3	4	Total
Pittsburgh	7	7	0	7	21
• Detroit	7	17	7	7	38

- Date: September 27
- Location: Briggs Stadium, Detroit
- Game attendance: 44,587

On September 27, 1953, the Lions defeated the Pittsburgh Steelers, 38–21, before a crowd of 44,587 at Briggs Stadium. Lew Carpenter intercepted a Jim Finks pass and returned it 73 yards for the Lions' first touchdown in the first quarter. The Lions scored 17 points in the second quarter on a one-yard touchdown run by Gene Gedman, a 40-yard field goal by Doak Walker, and a 49-yard touchdown pass from Bobby Layne to Leon Hart. Walker returned a kickoff 60 yards and scored 14 points on a third-quarter touchdown pass from Layne, the second-quarter field goal, and five extra point kicks. Bob Hoernschemeyer scored Detroit's final touchdown on a 29-yard pass from Layne. Layne passed for 364 yards in the game. In his first regular season NFL game, rookie linebacker Joe Schmidt was, according to the Detroit Free Press, "making tackles all over the field" and a key in holding the Steelers to 96 rushing yards.

=== Week 2: at Baltimore ===
Team	1	2	3	4	Total
• Detroit	7	3	17	0	27
Baltimore	7	10	0	0	17

- Date: October 3
- Location: Memorial Stadium, Baltimore
- Game attendance: 25,159

On October 3, 1953, the Lions won, 27–17, in a close game with the Baltimore Colts in a Saturday night game in front of 25,159 spectators at Memorial Stadium in Baltimore. The Lions' passing attack had an off night as the Colts intercepted six of Detroit's 17 passes. Bob Hoernschemeyer scored a touchdown in the first quarter on a 49-yard run that the Detroit Free Press called "one of the best runs in Lion history". Doak Walker kicked a field goal in the second quarter to give the Lions a 10–7 lead, but the Colts responded with a touchdown and field goal to take a 17–10 lead at halftime. The Lions responded with 17 points in the third quarter. Yale Lary returned a punt 74 yards for another touchdown, and backup quarterback Tom Dublinski, taking over with the score tied at 17, ran for a touchdown and kicked a field goal.

=== Week 3: San Francisco ===
Team	1	2	3	4	Total
San Francisco	7	7	7	0	21
• Detroit	10	7	7	0	24

- Date: October 11
- Location: Briggs Stadium, Detroit
- Game attendance: 58,079

On October 11, 1953, the Lions defeated the San Francisco 49ers, 24–21, in front of a record crowd of 58,079 at Briggs Stadium. The victory broke a five-game losing streak against the 49ers. On the third play from scrimmage, the Lions scored on a 23-yard touchdown pass from Doak Walker to Cloyce Box. Walker also kicked a 23-yard field goal in the first quarter, and Bob Hoernschemeyer ran for a touchdown in the third quarter. Bobby Layne threw a 36-yard touchdown pass to Leon Hart in the third quarter, but the 49ers closed the Lions' lead to three points on a short run by Y. A. Tittle. Jim David and Jack Christiansen hit Tittle as he scored, resulting in a triple fracture of Tittle's cheekbone. Les Bingaman also blocked a San Francisco field goal attempt in the game.

=== Week 4: Los Angeles ===
Team	1	2	3	4	Total
• Los Angeles	7	10	7	7	31
Detroit	0	9	10	0	19

- Date: October 18
- Location: Briggs Stadium, Detroit
- Game attendance: 55,772

On October 18, 1953, the Lions lost to the Los Angeles Rams, 31–19, in front of a crowd of 55,772 at Briggs Stadium. The defeat broke a six-game winning streak for the Lions, dating back to November 1952. The 31 points allowed was the highest allowed by the Lions since the 1951 season. Woodley Lewis was the star for the Rams, returning punts for 22, 45, and 78 yards (the latter for a touchdown), and kickoffs for 30, 69, 25, and 16 yards. Detroit scored on two touchdown passes from Bobby Layne to Leon Hart (16 yards in the second quarter) and Dorne Dibble (36 yards in the third quarter) and two Doak Walker field goals of 40 and 35 yards.

=== Week 5: at San Francisco ===
Team	1	2	3	4	Total
• Detroit	0	7	0	7	14
San Francisco	7	3	0	0	10

- Date: October 25
- Location: Kezar Stadium, San Francisco
- Game attendance: 54,862

On October 25, 1953, the Lions defeated the San Francisco 49ers, 14–10, in front of 54,862 spectators at Kezar Stadium in San Francisco. The victory was the first by a Lions team in San Francisco. The 49ers took a 7–0 lead in the first quarter on a short run by Joe Perry and extended their lead on a field goal in the second quarter, but were held scoreless for the remainder of the game. Late in the second quarter, the Lions cut the 49ers lead to three points on 47-yard touchdown pass from Bobby Layne to Dorne Dibble. The Lions scored the winning touchdown in the fourth quarter on a 24-yard pass from Layne to Ollie Cline. The winning touchdown was set up by a fake punt on fourth down, with Yale Lary carrying the ball 21 yards to the San Francisco 24-yard line. Y. A. Tittle, who fractured his cheekbone two weeks earlier against the Lions, appeared briefly in the game and was intercepted on both of his passes. The 49ers outgained the Lions, 351 yards to 239 yards.

=== Week 6: a Los Angeles ===
Team	1	2	3	4	Total
Detroit	10	7	0	7	24
• Los Angeles	0	9	21	7	37

- Date: November 1
- Location: Los Angeles Memorial Coliseum
- Game attendance: 97,751

On November 1, 1953, the Lions lost for the second time to the Los Angeles Rams, 37–24, in front of 97,751 spectators at the Los Angeles Memorial Coliseum. The Lions took a 10–0 lead in the first quarter on 38-yard field goal by Doak Walker and a 92-yard interception return by Jack Christiansen. Bobby Layne threw a three-yard touchdown pass to Leon Hart in the second quarter, and the Lions led, 17–9, at halftime. The Rams scored 21 unanswered points in the third quarter on a 74-yard run by Skeets Quinlan and two interception returns for touchdown. Norm Van Brocklin extended the Rams' lead to 37–17 with a 54-yard touchdown pass to Vitamin Smith early in the fourth quarter. Bob Hoernschemeyer scored a late touchdown on a one-yard run.

=== Week 7: Baltimore ===
Team	1	2	3	4	Total
Baltimore	7	0	0	7	14
• Detroit	0	7	3	7	17

- Date: November 7
- Location: Briggs Stadium, Detroit
- Game attendance: 46,508

On Saturday, November 7, 1953, the Lions defeated the Baltimore Colts, 17–7, in front of a crowd of 46,508 at Briggs Stadium. The Colts took a 7–0 lead in the first quarter on a run by Carl Taseff but were held scoreless in the final three quarters. The Lions tied the game in the second quarter on a 10-yard pass from Bobby Layne to Bob Hoernschemeyer but missed an opportunity to tie when Layne fumbled at Baltimore's one-yard line. The Lions took the lead in the third quarter on a 14-yard field goal by Doak Walker and extended their lead in the fourth quarter as Layne threw an eight-yard pass to Leon Hart. The Detroit defense forced six turnovers, five interceptions of quarterback Fred Enke's passes (including three by Jack Christiansen) and a recovery of a John Huzvar fumble by Jim Cain. Enke completed only four of 15 passes for 69 yards.

=== Week 8: at Green Bay ===
Team	1	2	3	4	Total
• Detroit	0	7	0	7	14
Green Bay	0	0	0	7	7

- Date: November 15
- Location: City Stadium, Green Bay
- Game attendance: 20,834

On November 15, 1953, the Lions defeated the Green Bay Packers, 14–7, in front of 20,834 spectators at City Stadium in Green Bay. The Packers outgained the Lions, 394 yards to 303, but the Lions intercepted four passes (three by Yale Lary in the second half) to halt Green Bay's drives. Detroit's touchdowns came on passes by Bobby Layne – an 83-yard completion to Doak Walker in the second quarter and a 22-yard completion to Leon Hart in the fourth quarter. The second touchdown deflected off a defensive back's hands and was caught by Hart at knee level. Harley Sewell and Bob Forte were ejected from the game in the fourth quarter for fighting.

=== Week 9: at Chicago ===
Team	1	2	3	4	Total
• Detroit	3	7	3	7	20
Chicago	3	6	7	0	16

- Date: November 22
- Location: Wrigley Field, Chicago
- Game attendance: 36,165

On November 22, 1953, the Lions defeated the Chicago Bears, 20–16, in front of a crowd of 36,165 at Wrigley Field in Chicago. Doak Walker scored all 20 Detroit points, and the Lions intercepted four of George Blanda's passes. The teams traded field goals by Blanda and Walker in the first quarter, and each scored touchdowns in the second quarter, though the Bears missed their extra point. Bob Hoernschemeyer scored for the Lions on a one-yard run. In the third period, the Bears took a 16–10 lead on a 55-yard touchdown pass from Blanda to Bill McColl. Walker kicked his second field goal late in the third quarter, and the Lions took the lead in the fourth quarter after a long field goal attempt by Walker fell short, and Detroit center Vince Banonis downed the ball at the one-yard line. Blanda threw a pass from deep in Chicago territory, and Bob Smith recovered the ball and returned it to the six-yard line. Walker then scored the winning touchdown on a two-yard run. The Lions gained a season-high 447 yards in the game.

=== Week 10: Green Bay ===
Team	1	2	3	4	Total
Green Bay	15	0	0	0	15
• Detroit	7	0	14	13	34

- Date: November 26
- Location: Briggs Stadium, Detroit
- Game attendance: 52,607

On Thursday, November 26, 1953, in the annual Thanksgiving Day game at Briggs Stadium, the Lions defeated the Green Bay Packers, 34–15, before a crowd of 52,607. The game was played under the lights in snow squalls in what the Detroit Free Press dubbed the game a "comedy of errors". The teams combined for 13 turnovers – seven by the Lions (five on interceptions, two on fumbles) and six by the Packers (three on interceptions, three on fumbles). At one point, Tom Dublinski and Babe Parilli threw interceptions on three consecutive plays. After Joe Schmidt intercepted a Parilli pass early in the first quarter, Bob Hoernschemeyer scored on a short run, but the Packers then scored 15 unanswered points to take a 15–7 half time lead. The Lions responded with 27 unanswered points in the second half. The Lions' comeback began with the longest touchdown pass in team history – a 97-yard pass (65 yards in the air) from Bobby Layne to Cloyce Box early in the third quarter. Hoernschemeyer ran 41 yards for a touchdown later in the third quarter, and Gene Gedman ran four yards for the Lions final touchdown early in the fourth quarter. Jim Martin completed the scoring with two fourth-quarter field goals.

=== Week 11: Chicago ===
Team	1	2	3	4	Total
Chicago	0	0	0	7	7
• Detroit	3	10	0	0	13

- Date: December 6
- Location: Briggs Stadium, Detroit
- Game attendance: 58,056

On December 6, 1953, the Lions defeated the Bears, 13–7, in front of a crowd of 58,056, the second largest of the season, at Briggs Stadium. It was the first time the Lions had beaten the Bears twice in the same season since. The Lions took a 13–0 lead in the first half as Doak Walker kicked field goals of 41 and 36 yards, and Bobby Layne threw a 38-yard touchdown pass to Dorne Dibble. Walker's second field goal gave him a Lions' club record with 12 field goals for the season. Layne, playing with a sore arm, completed six of 17 passes for 137 yards. The Detroit Free Press credited the "sparkling play" of Lions' defensive halfbacks with the victory, as they intercepted five of George Blanda's passes. The defense also held the Bears to 54 rushing yards.

=== Week 12: at New York ===
Team	1	2	3	4	Total
• Detroit	7	7	6	7	27
New York	7	0	0	9	16

- Date: December 13
- Location: Polo Grounds, New York City
- Game attendance: 28,390

On December 13, 1953, the Lions clinched the NFL Western Division championship with a 27–16 victory over the New York Giants in front of 28,390 spectators at the Polo Grounds in New York. Bobby Layne threw two touchdown passes in the first half – a 25-yard completion to Leon Hart and a 34-yard completion to Doak Walker. Walker also ran 50 yards for a touchdown in the third quarter. The Giants mounted a comeback in the fourth quarter with a touchdown and a safety, closing the score to 20–16. The Giants threatened three more times in the fourth quarter, but the defense intercepted two passes and stopped Frank Gifford on a fourth-down play at the one-yard line. After a Bob Smith interception, Gene Gedman sealed the Lions' victory with a four-yard run touchdown run late in the fourth quarter. With five interceptions in the game, the Lions totaled 38 for the season – four behind the NFL record of 42.

=== NFL Championship Game ===
Team	1	2	3	4	Total
Cleveland	0	3	7	6	16
• Detroit	7	3	0	7	17

- Date: December 27
- Location: Briggs Stadium, Detroit
- Game attendance: 54,577

On December 27, 1953, the Lions played the Cleveland Browns in the 1953 NFL Championship Game at Briggs Stadium in Detroit. Playing before a crowd of 54,577, the Lions defeated the Browns, 17–16. The Lions took a 7–0 lead in the first quarter on a one-yard touchdown run by Doak Walker. Walker and Lou Groza both kicked field goals in the second quarter, and the Lions led, 10–3, at halftime. In the second half, the Browns scored 13 unanswered points and led, 16–10, with less than five minutes remaining in the fourth quarter. The Lions drove 80 yards for a touchdown, capped by a 33-yard pass from Bobby Layne to Jim Doran with two minutes left in the game. On the ensuing drive, Carl Karilivacz intercepted an Otto Graham pass to clinch the victory. The Lions' defensive backfield as a whole contributed to the victory, limiting Graham, a Pro Football Hall of Fame inductee, to two completions (and an equal number of interceptions) on 15 passes for a total of four passing yards. The Detroit Free Press called it Graham's "darkest day in eight years of pro ball."

== Awards, honors and league leaders ==
=== Team awards ===
At the end of the regular season, the Lions players voted offensive guard Dick Stanfel as the team's most valuable player.

=== All-NFL honors ===
The following eight Lions players won All-Pro honors from the Associated Press (AP), United Press International (UPI) and/or the New York Daily News:

- Les Bingaman – AP (first-team All-NFL); UPI (first-team All-NFL)
- Jack Christiansen – AP (first-team All-NFL); UPI (first-team All-NFL)
- Lou Creekmur – AP (first-team All-NFL); UPI (first-team All-NFL)
- Bob Hoernschemeyer – NY Daily News (first-team All-NFL); UPI (second-team All-NFL)
- Bobby Layne – UPI (second-team All-NFL)
- Thurman McGraw – NY Daily News (first-team All-NFL); UPI (second-team All-NFL)
- Dick Stanfel – AP (first-team All-NFL); UPI (first-team All-NFL)
- Doak Walker – AP (first-team All-NFL); UPI (second-team All-NFL)

=== Pro Bowl ===
In addition, seven Lions players were selected 1954 Pro Bowl:

- Les Bingaman
- Jack Christiansen
- Lou Creekmur
- Yale Lary
- Bobby Layne
- Dick Stanfel
- Doak Walker

=== NFL leaders ===
Several Lions players were also among the NFL leaders in various statistical categories, including the following:

- Jack Christiansen

12 interceptions (1st)
238 interception return yards (1st)

- Bob Hoernschemeyer

482 rushing yards (9th)
7 rushing touchdowns (3rd)
4.8 yards/rush (7th)

- Bobby Layne

2,431 yards total offense (3rd)
2,088 passing yards (6th)
16 passing touchdowns (5th)
21 passes intercepted (3rd)
45.8% pass completion (7th)

- Yale Lary

115 punt return yards (7th)
8.8 yards/punt return (4th)

- Bob Smith

41.2 yards/punt (8th)
119 interception return yards (7th)

- Doak Walker

93 points scored (3rd)
12 field goals (2nd)
27 extra points made (5th)

=== Pro Football Hall of Fame ===
Six members of the team were later inducted into the Pro Football Hall of Fame. They are:

- Bobby Layne (inducted 1967)
- Jack Christiansen (inducted 1970)
- Joe Schmidt (inducted 1973)
- Yale Lary (inducted 1979)
- Doak Walker (inducted 1986)
- Lou Creekmur (inducted 1996)
- Dick Stanfel (inducted 2016)
