= 1953 San Francisco 49ers season =

American football team season

- Owner: Tony Morabito
- General manager: Louis Spadia
- Head coach: Buck Shaw
- Home stadium: Kezar Stadium

Results
- Record: 9–3
- Division place: 2nd NFL Western
- Playoffs: Did not qualify

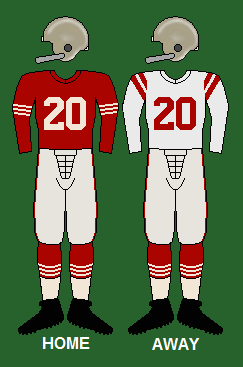
The uniform during the season

The 1953 San Francisco 49ers season was the franchise's 4th season in the National Football League and their 8th overall. They were coming off a 7–5 record in 1952.

The 49ers played consistent football all season long, never losing consecutive games throughout the season en route to a franchise-best 9–3 record. However, the 49ers lost both their games against the Detroit Lions, who finished the season 10–2 to win the Western Conference and earn a spot in the NFL Championship game.

Offensively, San Francisco was led by quarterback Y. A. Tittle, who threw for 2,121 yards and 20 TDs while completing 57.5% of his passes. Running back Joe Perry had another great season, rushing for 1,018 yards along with 10 TDs, while Hugh McElhenny rushed for 503 yards and 3 TDs, and caught 30 passes for 474 yards and 6 TDs. Wide receiver Billy Wilson caught a team-high 51 passes for 840 yards and 10 TDs.

== Offseason ==
=== NFL draft ===
1953 San Francisco 49ers draft
Round	Pick	Player	Position	College	Notes
1	1	Harry Babcock	End	Georgia	Bonus lottery pick
1	10	Tom Stolhandske	Linebacker	Texas	signed with Edmonton Eskimos (WIFU); played with 49ers in 1955.
2	21	George Morris	Center	Georgia Tech	played with 49ers in 1956.
3	32	Bob St. Clair * ^{†}	Tackle	Tulsa	
4	47	Ed Fullerton	Defensive back	Maryland	
5	58	Hal Miller	Tackle	Georgia Tech	
7	83	Paul Carr	Defensive back	Houston	
8	94	Doug Hogland	Guard	Oregon State	
9	105	Hal Ledyard	Quarterback	Chattanooga	
10	119	Pete Brown	Center	Georgia Tech	
11	130	Al Charlton	Back	Washington State	
12	141	Carson (Red) Leach	Guard	Duke	
13	155	Bill Earley	Back	Washington	
14	166	Tom Fletcher	Back	Arizona State	
15	177	Charley Genthner	Tackle	Texas	
16	191	Fred Durig	End	Bowling Green	
17	202	Hugh Latham	Tackle	San Diego State	
18	213	Stan Wacholz	End	San Jose State	
19	227	King DuClos	Tackle	UTEP	
20	238	Ray Huizinga	Tackle	Northwestern	
21	249	Ken Bahnsen	Fullback	North Texas State	
22	263	Laverne Robbins	Guard	Midwestern State	
23	274	Travis Hunt	Tackle	Alabama	
24	285	Ed Morgan	Back	Tennessee	
25	299	Ernie Stockert	End	UCLA	
26	310	Harley Cooper	Back	Arizona State	
27	321	Ralph McLeod	End	LSU	
28	335	Tom Novikoff	Back	Oregon	
29	346	Don Stillwell	End	USC	
Made roster † Pro Football Hall of Fame * Made at least one Pro Bowl during career

== Preseason ==
Week	Date	Opponent	Result	Record	Venue
1	August 15	Fort Ord	W 42–7	1–0	Charles C. Hughes Stadium
2	August 23	Cleveland Browns	L 7–20	1–1	Kezar Stadium
3	August 30	Washington Redskins	L 7–20	1–2	Kezar Stadium
4	September 3	at Los Angeles Rams	L 10–35	1–3	Los Angeles Memorial Coliseum
5	September 7	vs. Philadelphia Eagles	W 31–28	2–3	Alamo Stadium
6	September 13	Chicago Cardinals	T 14–14	2–3–1	Kezar Stadium
7	September 17	at New York Giants	L 21–28	2–4–1	Polo Grounds

== Schedule ==
Week	Date	Opponent	Result	Record	Venue	Attendance	Recap
1	September 27	Philadelphia Eagles	**W** 31–21	1–0	Kezar Stadium	25,000	Recap
2	October 4	**Los Angeles Rams**	**W** 31–30	2–0	Kezar Stadium	41,446	Recap
3	October 11	at **Detroit Lions**	**L** 21–24	2–1	Briggs Stadium	56,080	Recap
4	October 18	at **Chicago Bears**	**W** 35–28	3–1	Wrigley Field	36,909	Recap
5	October 25	**Detroit Lions**	**L** 10–14	3–2	Kezar Stadium	52,300	Recap
6	November 1	**Chicago Bears**	**W** 24–14	4–2	Kezar Stadium	26,308	Recap
7	November 8	at **Los Angeles Rams**	**W** 31–27	5–2	Los Angeles Memorial Coliseum	85,856	Recap
8	November 15	at Cleveland Browns	**L** 21–23	5–3	Cleveland Stadium	80,698	Recap
9	November 22	at **Green Bay Packers**	**W** 37–7	6–3	Milwaukee County Stadium	16,378	Recap
10	November 29	at **Baltimore Colts**	**W** 38–21	7–3	Memorial Stadium	26,005	Recap
11	December 6	**Green Bay Packers**	**W** 48–14	8–3	Kezar Stadium	31,337	Recap
12	December 13	**Baltimore Colts**	**W** 45–14	9–3	Kezar Stadium	23,932	Recap
Note: Intra-conference opponents are in **bold** text.

=== Game summaries ===
==== Week 1: vs. Philadelphia Eagles ====
Week 1: Philadelphia Eagles at San Francisco 49ers – Game summary

Quarter	1	2	3	4	Total
Eagles	7	0	7	7	**21**
**49ers**	14	3	7	7	**31**

at Kezar Stadium, San Francisco, California

- Date: September 8, 1946
- Game attendance: 25,000
- Boxscore

Game information

**First quarter**

- Joe Arenas 18 yard pass from Y. A. Tittle (Gordie Soltau kick). 49ers 7–0.
- Adrian Burk 1 yard run (Bobby Walston kick). Tied 7–7.
- Y. A. Tittle 1 yard run (Gordie Soltau kick). 49ers 14–7.

**Second quarter**

- Gordie Soltau 39 yard field goal. 49ers 17–7.

**Third quarter**

- Billy Wilson 39 yard pass from Y. A. Tittle (Gordie Soltau kick) 49ers 24–7.
- Bobby Walston 3 yard pass from Adrian Burk (Walston kick). 49ers 24–14.

**Fourth quarter**

- Billy Wilson 37 yard pass from Y. A. Tittle (Gordie Soltau kick). 49ers 31–14.
- Pete Pihos 10 yard pass from Bobby Thomason (Al Pollard kick). 49ers 31–24.

**Top passers**

- PHI –
- SF –

**Top rushers**

- PHI –
- SF –

**Top receivers**

- PHI –
- SF –

=== Standings ===
NFL Western Conference
	W	L	T	PCT	CONF	PF	PA	STK
Detroit Lions	10	2	0	.833	8–2	271	205	W6
San Francisco 49ers	9	3	0	.750	8–2	372	237	W4
Los Angeles Rams	8	3	1	.727	7–3	366	236	W2
Chicago Bears	3	8	1	.273	2–7–1	218	262	L2
Baltimore Colts	3	9	0	.250	2–8	182	350	L7
Green Bay Packers	2	9	1	.182	2–7–1	200	338	L5

Note: Tie games were not officially counted in the standings until 1972.

== Personnel ==
=== Roster ===
1953 San Francisco 49ers roster
Quarterbacks: 12 Hal Ledyard; 15 Jim Powers P; 14 Y. A. Tittle; Running backs: 22 Joe Arenas CB; 39 Hugh McElhenny; 49 Jim Monachino; 34 Joe Perry; 44 Pete Schabarum; Receivers: 88 Harry Babcock; 82 Gordy Soltau K; 84 Billy Wilson	Offensive linemen: 63 Bruno Banducci G; 67 Nick Feher G; 64 Doug Hogland T; 53 Bill Johnson C; 77 Hal Miller T; 69 Jerry Smith G; 79 Bob St. Clair T; Defensive linemen: 75 Al Carapella DT; 83 Clay Matthews DE; 62 Art Michalik MG; 73 Leo Nomellini DT; 87 Charley Powell DE; 89 Bob Van Doren DE	Linebackers: 33 Hardy Brown MLB; 56 Pete Brown MLB/C; 66 Don Burke OLB/MG; 54 Jack Manley OLB; 36 John Morton OLB; Defensive backs: 23 Rex Berry CB; 45 Fred Bruney S; 48 Billy Mixon CB/RB; 42 Lowell Wagner CB	Reserve lists: -- Bill Jessup WR (Military); -- Bob Toneff T/DT (Military)

Note: Rookies are placed in italics.

== Pro Bowl ==
San Francisco's players selected for the Pro Bowl:

Player	Position
Bill Johnson	Offensive line
Hugh McElhenny	Running back
Art Michalik	Linebacker
Leo Nomellini	Defensive line
Joe Perry	Running back
Gordie Soltau	Wide receiver
Y. A. Tittle	Quarterback
