= Teeuwen =

Teeuwen (Dutch pronunciation: [ˈteːu.ə(n)]) is a Dutch patronymic surname. Teeuw, Teeuwes, Tewis, Theeuwis etc. are archaic short forms of the given name Matthew/Mattheus. The surname has many variant forms, including Tewes and Theeuwes. People with the surname include:

- David Teeuwen (1970–2015), American editor and journalist
- Hans Teeuwen (born 1967), Dutch comedian, musician, actor and filmmaker
- Ingrid Teeuwen (born 1981), Dutch weightlifter
- Margje Teeuwen (born 1974), Dutch field hockey midfielder
- Mark Teeuwen (born 1966), Dutch academic and Japanologist

Variant forms

- Andries Teeuw (1921–2012), Dutch critic of Indonesian literature
- Anouk Teeuwe (born 1975), Dutch singer-songwriter and record producer known as Anouk
- Arjen Teeuwissen (born 1971), Dutch equestrian
- Len Teeuws (1927–2006), American football player
- Fred Teeven (born 1958), Dutch VVD politician
