= Theeuwes =

Theeuwes (Dutch pronunciation: [ˈteːu.əs]) is a Dutch patronymic surname. Theeuw, Teeuwes, Tewis, Theeuwis etc. are archaic short forms of the given name Matthew/Mattheus. The surname has many variant forms, including Teeuwen and Tewes. Notable people with the surname include:

- Jacques Theeuwes (born 1944), Dutch organizational theorist
- Janus Theeuwes (1886–1975), Dutch archer
- Jules Theeuwes (1944–2012), Belgian economist
- Lodewijk Theeuwes (fl.1560–1585), Flemish harpsichord maker
- Marcellin Theeuwes (1936–2019), Dutch Carthusian prior

Variant forms

- Arjen Teeuwissen (born 1971), Dutch equestrian
- Len Teeuws (1927–2006), American football player
- Ties Theeuwkens (born 1985), Dutch basketball player
- Frans Theuws (born 1953), Dutch historian, medievalist and archaeologist
- Thomas Thewes (1931–2008), American business executive
- Hans Thewissen (born c.1960), Dutch-born American paleontologist
- Rachelle Thiewes (born 1952), American jeweler and metal artist
