= Leon Hart =

American football player (1928–2002)

- Hart at the 1953 NFL Championship

No. 82
- Positions: End, Fullback

Personal information
- Born: November 2, 1928; Pittsburgh, Pennsylvania, U.S.
- Died: September 24, 2002 (aged 73); South Bend, Indiana, U.S.
- Listed height: 6 ft 5 in (1.96 m)
- Listed weight: 257 lb (117 kg)

Career information
- High school: Turtle Creek (Turtle Creek, Pennsylvania)
- College: Notre Dame (1946–1949)
- NFL draft: 1950: 1st round, 1st overall pick

Career history
- Detroit Lions (1950–1957)

Awards and highlights
- 3× NFL champion (1952, 1953, 1957); First-team All-Pro (1951); 2× Second-team All-Pro (1954, 1956); Pro Bowl (1951); 3× National champion (1946, 1947, 1949); Heisman Trophy (1949); Maxwell Award (1949); Associated Press Male Athlete of the Year (1949); SN Player of the Year (1949); Unanimous All-American (1949); Consensus All-American (1948); First-team All-American (1947)

Career NFL statistics
- Receptions: 174
- Receiving yards: 2,499
- Rushing yards: 612
- Rushing average: 4.3
- Total touchdowns: 32
- Stats at Pro Football Reference
- College Football Hall of Fame

Leon Joseph Hart (November 2, 1928 – September 24, 2002) was an American football player. He played college football for the Notre Dame Fighting Irish, winning the Heisman Trophy and Maxwell Award in 1949. He also received All-American honors in three consecutive years from 1947 to 1949. In his four years at Notre Dame, he helped the team to a 36–0–2 record with national championships in 1946, 1947, and 1949. He also played professional football for eight seasons, from 1950 to 1957, with the Detroit Lions of the National Football League (NFL).

Hart is the only lineman to win three college football national championships and three NFL championships. He is the most recent of only two linemen ever to win the Heisman Trophy. Also, he is one of five players, along with Angelo Bertelli, Cam Newton, Joe Burrow and Fernando Mendoza to win the Heisman Trophy, a national championship, and be the first overall pick in the NFL draft all in the same one-year span.

Hart was a pioneer for NFL player benefits, risking his pro career and initiating union talks targeting support for a reasonable standard of living for all players during the 1954 season, well before the eventual formulation of the NFLPA. He also spearheaded an initiative for the inclusion of players who retired prior to the 1959 season in the NFL pension plan.

== Early life ==
Hart was born in Pittsburgh in 1928 raised in nearby Turtle Creek, Pennsylvania, and attended Turtle Creek High School. He won varsity letters in football, basketball and baseball while in high school.

== College career ==
Hart attended the University of Notre Dame where he played college football at the end position, both offense and defense, for Frank Leahy's Fighting Irish football teams from 1946 to 1949. He received first-team All-American honors three times, from the Football Writers Association of America (FWAA) in 1947 and as a consensus first-team selection in 1948 and 1949. During his four years at Notre Dame, Hart caught 49 passes for 701 yards and 15 touchdowns, at that time a collegiate record. The Fighting Irish compiled a 46–0–2 record and won three national championships while Hart was a player.

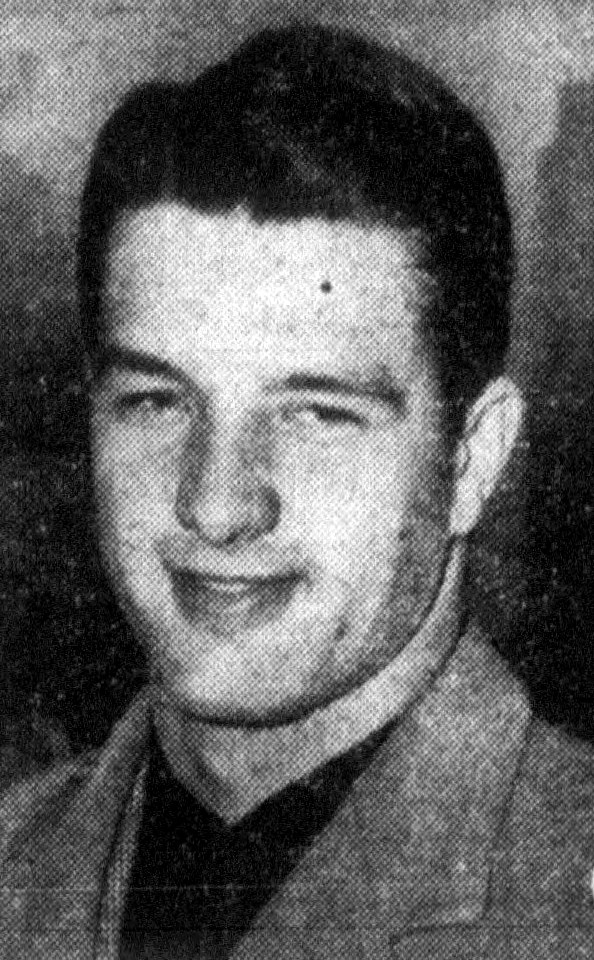
Leon Hart, circa 1953.

Hart began playing for Notre Dame as a 17-year-old freshman in 1946.

Hart was the captain of the 1949 Notre Dame team that compiled a perfect 10–0 record, outscored their opponents 360–86, and was recognized in the final AP Poll as the 1949 national champion. At the end of the 1949 season, Hart won both the Heisman Trophy and the Maxwell Award. He was also voted as the Associated Press Athlete of the Year award with 104 points, edging professional baseball player Jackie Robinson (55 points).

Hart graduated from Notre Dame in 1950 with a degree in mechanical engineering.

== Professional career ==
Hart was selected by the Detroit Lions with the first overall pick in the 1950 NFL draft. He signed a three-year contract with the Lions in February 1950 for a salary reported to be close to $20,000. He played for the Lions from 1950 to 1957, appeared in 92 games, and was a member of NFL championship teams in 1952, 1953, and 1957. During his eight-year NFL career, Hart gained 3,111 yards from scrimmage, caught 174 passes for 2,499 yards, and scored 32 touchdowns and 192 points.

== NFL career statistics ==
Legend
| | Won the NFL championship |
| | Led the league |
| **Bold** | Career high |

=== Regular season ===
| Year | Team | Games | | Receiving | | | | |
| Year | Team | GP | GS | Rec | Yds | Avg | Lng | TD |
|---|---|---|---|---|---|---|---|---|
| 1950 | DET | 12 | 12 | 31 | 505 | 16.3 | **66** | 1 |
| 1951 | DET | 12 | 12 | **35** | **544** | 15.5 | 33 | **12** |
| 1952 | DET | 11 | 10 | 32 | 376 | 11.8 | 24 | 4 |
| 1953 | DET | 12 | 12 | 25 | 472 | **18.9** | 49 | 7 |
| 1954 | DET | 12 | 10 | 24 | 377 | 15.7 | 40 | 0 |
| 1955 | DET | 11 | 8 | 9 | 54 | 6.0 | 14 | 1 |
| 1956 | DET | 11 | 7 | 14 | 116 | 8.3 | 29 | 1 |
| 1957 | DET | 11 | 0 | 4 | 55 | 13.8 | 22 | 0 |
| Career | | 92 | 71 | 174 | 2,499 | 14.4 | 66 | 26 |

=== Playoffs ===
| Year | Team | Games | | Receiving | | | | |
| Year | Team | GP | GS | Rec | Yds | Avg | Lng | TD |
|---|---|---|---|---|---|---|---|---|
| 1952 | DET | 2 | 2 | **6** | **101** | 16.8 | **24** | **1** |
| 1953 | DET | 1 | 1 | 0 | 0 | 0.0 | 0 | 0 |
| 1954 | DET | 1 | 0 | 1 | 19 | **19.0** | 19 | 0 |
| 1957 | DET | 2 | 0 | 0 | 0 | 0.0 | 0 | 0 |
| Career | | 6 | 3 | 7 | 120 | 17.1 | 24 | 1 |

== Family and later life ==
In February 1950, Hart married Lois Newyahr, his high school girlfriend, at St. Colman's Roman Catholic Church in Turtle Creek. After retiring from football, he lived in Birmingham, Michigan. He operated a business that manufactured equipment to balance tires.

Hart was inducted into the College Football Hall of Fame in 1973. He died in 2002 at St. Joseph Medical Center in South Bend, Indiana, at age 73. He was buried in the Cedar Grove Cemetery in Notre Dame, Indiana.
