= Jug Girard =

American football player (1927–1997)

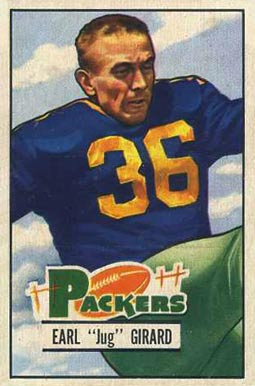
- Girard on a 1951 Bowman football card

No. 36, 23, 41
- Positions: End, back

Personal information
- Born: January 25, 1927; Marinette, Wisconsin, U.S.
- Died: January 17, 1997 (aged 69); Rochester Hills, Michigan, U.S.
- Listed height: 5 ft 11 in (1.80 m)
- Listed weight: 176 lb (80 kg)

Career information
- High school: Marinette
- College: Wisconsin
- NFL draft: 1948: 1st round, 7th overall pick

Career history
- Green Bay Packers (1948–1951); Detroit Lions (1952–1956); Pittsburgh Steelers (1957)

Awards and highlights
- 2× NFL champion (1952, 1953); First-team All-American (1944)

Career NFL statistics
- Punts: 397
- Punt yards: 15,927
- Longest punt: 72
- Rushing yards: 703
- Rushing average: 3.6
- Receptions: 109
- Receiving yards: 1,838
- Total touchdowns: 18
- Stats at Pro Football Reference

Earl Francis "Jug" Girard (January 25, 1927 – January 17, 1997) was an American professional football player. He played ten seasons in the National Football League (NFL) as an end, halfback, quarterback, punter, kickoff returner, defensive back, and punt returner. He played for the Green Bay Packers (1948–1951), Detroit Lions (1952–1956), and Pittsburgh Steelers (1957). He won two NFL Championships with the Lions in 1952 and 1953. He played college football at the University of Wisconsin in 1944 and 1947 and was selected as a first-team All-American halfback at age 17 in 1944.

== Early life ==
Girard was born and raised in Marinette, Wisconsin, at the mouth of Green Bay. He was a star athlete in multiple sports, including baseball, basketball, and football, in high school.

== Wisconsin and Army ==
While still in high school, Girard received offers to play baseball for five major league teams. Instead, he enrolled at the University of Wisconsin in the fall of 1944. Girard gained acclaim for his play at the halfback position. Before playing his first college game he was touted as the greatest passer ever to play for the Wisconsin Badgers football program. He lived up to the hype, as he became a star player as a 17-year-old freshman. At the end of the 1944 season, he was selected by Look magazine as a first-team All-American at the halfback position. He was also selected by the undefeated 1944 Ohio State Buckeyes football team as the most valuable player on the teams that the Buckeyes played against.

Girard's collegiate career was interrupted when he was inducted into the United States Army in April 1945. In November 1945, Girard was discharged from the Army, but reenlisted a day later to continue in the military for another year.

Girard returned to the University of Wisconsin as a student in January 1947, and rejoined the football team for the 1947 season. In a November 1947 game against Iowa, he returned two punts for touchdowns, one return of 63 yards and the other 85 yards.

== NFL career ==
=== Green Bay Packers ===
Girard was selected by the Green Bay Packers with the seventh pick in the first round of the 1948 NFL draft. He was also offered a $7,500 per year contract by the New York Yankees of the All-America Football Conference, indicating in early January 1948 that he intended to sign with that team. Two days later, Girard agreed to join the Packers for an undisclosed sum. Girard's mother refused to sign the contract with the Packers, and as a result Girard's formal signing with the Packers did not occur until his 21st birthday on January 25, 1948, at which time it was reported that he would be paid $8,000 for the 1948 season.

He appeared in 10 games for the Packers in 1948, punting eight times for a 40-yard average. He also played for the Green Bay Packers basketball team after the 1948 football season.

In April 1949, Girard was married to Joan Leddy. At the time, Girard was training in Florida with the Cleveland Indians minor league baseball team in Dayton, Ohio. Girard spent the summer of 1949 playing baseball for the Green Bay Bluejays, where he led the league with a .367 batting average, 122 hits, 34 extra base hits in 89 games. He was inducted into the Wisconsin State League Baseball Hall of Fame in 1952.

In late July 1949, he signed a contract to return to the Packers, but was allowed to complete the baseball season with the Bluejays before joining the Packers' training camp. After a disappointing rookie season in 1948, Girard emerged as a star for the Packers in 1949. He led the Packers, and ranked eighth in the NFL, with 881 passing yards. He also ranked seventh in the NFL in passer rating, led the NFL with three blocked punts, rushed for 198 yards, and led the NFL with 69 punts, including a career-long 72-yard punt. He also ranked ninth in the NFL with 1,079 yards of total offense (881 yards passing and 198 rushing).

In November 1949, Girard signed to play with the Oshkosh, Wisconsin, basketball team in the Wisconsin State Basketball League. He agreed to join the team at the end of the NFL season. In May 1950, he agreed to return to professional baseball, playing for the Cleveland Indians' minor league club in Cedar Rapids, Iowa. Less than a month later, Girard left the Cedar Rapids club, stating: "I've decided to give my full attention to pro football and give up baseball altogether. It's too hard on me to do both."

One day after retiring from professional baseball, Girard signed a contract to return to the Packers for the 1950 season. That fall, Girard was limited to the role of punter, appearing in 10 games, none as a starter. He punted 71 times for an average of 38.2 yards per punt.

In the summer of 1951, Girard made another attempt at professional baseball, playing for Wilkes-Barre in the Class A Eastern League. In July 1951, Girard signed his fourth one-year contract with the Packers. During the 1951 NFL season, Girard appeared in 12 games and punted 52 times for an average of 40.4 yards per punt. He also intercepted five passes and caught 10 passes, including two touchdown catches. On October 27, 1951, he caught four passes for 130 yards, including a 75-yard touchdown reception.

=== Detroit Lions ===
In July 1952, the Packers traded Girard to the Detroit Lions in exchange for Ed Berrang and Steve Dowden. In Girard's first season in Detroit, the 1952 Lions won the NFL Championship. Girard appeared in 11 game for the 1952 Lions, several as a starting halfback, replacing Doak Walker who was injured in the second game of the 1952 season. In his first game as a Lion playing in Green Bay, Girard scored two touchdowns in a 52–17 Lions victory.

Girard gained 538 yards from scrimmage and scored four touchdowns for the 1952 Lions, compiling 222 rushing yards and 316 receiving yards. When Walker returned to the starting lineup in mid-December 1952, Detroit head coach Buddy Parker said, "Jug Girard did a terrific job in place of Doak. There's nothing like having two top notch left halfbacks ready to go. Actually, I'd have a little trouble deciding which one to start. But since Jug's knee is banged up a little, the problem is settled. Doak will start."

During the summer of 1953, Girard returned to baseball as the manager of the Kaukauna, Wisconsin, team in the Fox River Valley Semi Pro League.

In late July 1953, Girard again signed to play for the Detroit Lions. He appeared in 11 games for the 1953 Lions, but his playing time was limited due to the return of Doak Walker to the lineup. Girard gained only 73 rushing yards and 24 receiving yards in 1953. Due to a knee injury, Girard was prescribed an "extra heavy right shoe" to wear during the 1953 season.

In 1954, Girard helped lead the Lions to the NFL Championship Game for the third consecutive year. He became one of Bobby Layne's favorite targets, leading the team with seven touchdown catches. In all, Girard caught 27 passes for 421 yards in 1954. He also returned 12 kickoffs for 248 yards and punted 63 times for a 41-yard average. On December 19, 1954, Girard caught the game-winning catch from Layne with 50 second remaining in the game to defeat the Cleveland Browns in the final regular season game.

Girard continued to play for the Lions in 1955 and 1956 as a punter and end. He gained 307 receiving yards in 1955, but his production fell in 1956. On December 2, 1956, Girard came into a game against the Chicago Bears on a fourth down play with nine yards to go. Girard lined up in punt formation, but he faked the punt and passed the ball 20 yards for first down to Dorne Dibble. It was his first completed pass for Detroit.

Girard was dubbed "Mr. Versatility" in Detroit, having played for the Lions as an offensive end (left and right), halfback (left and right), punter, kickoff specialist, punt returner, kickoff returner, and some defense as well.

=== Pittsburgh Steelers ===
In April 1957, Girard signed a contract with the Detroit Lions to play his tenth season in the NFL. However, in May 1957, the Lions sold Girard to the Baltimore Colts. Then, in September 1957, shortly before the start of the regular season, he was sold by the Colts to the Pittsburgh Steelers. During the 1957 NFL season, Girard played at left end and punter for the Steelers. He was the Steelers' #2 receiver, catching 21 passes for 419 yards and four touchdowns. He also punted 68 times for a 40.5 yard average.

Girard announced his retirement from football in 1958, but then attempted a comeback with the Steelers in August 1958.

== Later years and family ==
Girard lived in the Detroit area after retiring from football. He ran a bar called "The Lion's Den" and later worked as a manufacturer's representative. He died in Rochester Hills, Michigan, in 1997, at age 69.
