= Les Bingaman =

American football player and coach (1926–1970)

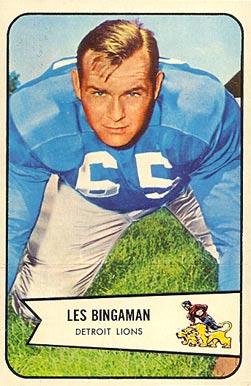
- Bingaman on a 1954 Bowman football card

No. 65
- Positions: Middle guard, tackle

Personal information
- Born: February 3, 1926; McKenzie, Tennessee, U.S.
- Died: November 20, 1970 (aged 44); Miami, Florida, U.S.
- Listed height: 6 ft 3 in (1.91 m)
- Listed weight: 272 lb (123 kg)

Career information
- High school: Lew Wallace (Gary, Indiana)
- College: Illinois (1944-1947)
- NFL draft: 1948: 3rd round, 15th overall pick

Career history

Playing
- Detroit Lions (1948–1954)

Coaching
- Detroit Lions (1960–1964) Defensive line coach; Miami Dolphins (1966-1969) Defensive line coach

Awards and highlights
- 2× NFL champion (1952, 1953); 4× First-team All-Pro (1951–1954); 2× Pro Bowl (1951, 1953; Second-team All-Big Ten (1945)

Career NFL statistics
- Games played: 80
- Games started: 57
- Fumble recoveries: 9
- Stats at Pro Football Reference

Lester Alonza "Bingo" Bingaman (February 3, 1926 – November 20, 1970) was an American professional football player for the Detroit Lions of the National Football League (NFL). He played college football for the Illinois Fighting Illini from 1944 to 1947 before playing for the Lions from 1948 to 1954. He earned trips to the Pro Bowl after the 1951 and 1953 seasons. He was also selected as a first-team All Pro player four consecutive years from 1951 to 1954. At times weighing as much as 350 pounds, Bingaman was the heaviest player in the NFL during his playing career. He later worked as an assistant coach for Detroit from 1960 to 1964 and for the Miami Dolphins from 1966 to 1969.

== Early life ==
Bingaman was born in 1926 in McKenzie, Tennessee, moved to Indiana, and attended Lew Wallace High School in Gary, Indiana.

== College football ==
Bingaman enrolled at the University of Illinois and played college football at the tackle position for the Fighting Illini football team from 1944 to 1947. He was the starting right tackle for the 1946 Illinois Fighting Illini football team that won the Big Ten Conference championship, was ranked #5 in the final AP Poll, and defeated #4 UCLA in the 1947 Rose Bowl.

== Professional football player ==
Bingaman was selected by the Detroit Lions in the third round (15th overall pick) of the 1948 NFL draft, signed with the Lions in June 1948, and played for the team, principally at the middle guard position on defense, for seven years from 1948 to 1954. He appeared in 78 NFL games and was selected as a second-team All Pro in 1950 and a first-team All Pro in 1951 (AP), 1952 (UP), 1953 (AP, UP), and 1954 (AP, UP, TSN). He was also chosen to play in the Pro Bowl after the 1951 and 1953 seasons. He was a member of the Lions' NFL championship teams in 1952 and 1953. In August 1954, he weighed in at 349-1/2 pounds, with the Lions having to use the scale at a grain elevator to capture his weight. According to one account published in 1960, he was "the biggest man who ever played professional football". At the end of the 1954 season, Bingaman announced that he was retiring at age 29, noting that it was "getting tougher every year to get in shape."

== Coaching career ==
After retiring as a player, Bingaman took a job working in public relations for Goebel Brewing Company in Detroit. He also owned a bar in Detroit. He testified in a 1957 drunk driving case against former teammate Bobby Layne that he had served Layne six or seven scotch and waters, but nevertheless believed that Layne "was very capable of driving." Layne was found not guilty. Bingaman also testified that the Scotch he served had "practically no alcoholic proof," prompting one Detroit columnist to write, "Greater love hath no man than he should ruin his business for a friend."

In 1959, he sold his bar, and in 1960, he was hired as an assistant coach by the Detroit Lions. He replaced Buster Ramsey as the Lions' defensive line coach under head coach George Wilson. He served for five years as the Lions' defensive line coach, leading a group that became known as the Fearsome Foursome (Roger Brown, Alex Karras, Darris McCord, and Sam Williams) and was acknowledged as one of the best defensive lines in the NFL. After the Lions compiled a 7–5–2 record in 1964, team owner William Clay Ford Sr. fired five assistant coaches, including Bingaman.

In February 1966, after spending 1965 working as an NFL scout, Bingaman was hired as an assistant coach by the Miami Dolphins. He rejoined his former boss, George Wilson, who took over as the Dolphins' head coach one week earlier. In January 1967, Bingaman rejected an offer from Joe Schmidt to return to the Lions, opting remain with George Wilson in Miami. On December 7, 1969, he collapsed on the sidelines during a game against the Denver Broncos. He had no pulse or heartbeat for three minutes and had to be revived with a shot of adrenaline injected into his heart. He was diagnosed as having suffered "an irregularity of the heart-beat which caused him to go into temporary shock."

After the 1969 season, George Wilson was fired by the Dolphins and replaced by Don Shula. In February 1970, Shula offered Bingaman "a position involving special assignments." He spent the year as a special assistant, scouting college players for the Dolphins.

== Family and death ==
Bingaman was married in 1949 and divorced in 1956. His wife alleged in the 1956 divorce proceedings that Bingaman "beat her, neglected her and made her feel unwanted." He later remarried, and he and his second wife, Betty, had a son, Lester Bingaman III.

Bingaman suffered from weight issues after retiring as a player. In 1963, he lost 86 pounds in four months, reducing to 225 pounds. He suffered congestive heart failure in early 1968 and began dieting anew. He then collapsed on the sideline of a Dolphins' game in December 1969. In November 1970, he died in his sleep from a heart attack at age 44.
