= 1953 Green Bay Packers season =

NFL team season

- Head coach: Gene Ronzani (10 games); Ray McLean (interim); Hugh Devore (interim)
- Home stadium: City Stadium; Milwaukee County Stadium

Results
- Record: 2–9–1
- Division place: 6th NFL Western
- Playoffs: Did not qualify

The 1953 Green Bay Packers season was their 35th season overall and their 33rd in the National Football League. The team finished with a 2–9–1 record under head coach Gene Ronzani and interim co-coaches Ray McLean, and Hugh Devore, and finished last in the newly named Western Conference.

Fourth-year head coach Ronzani led the team for the first ten games, but resigned after a nationally televised Thanksgiving Day loss, his eighth loss to the Detroit Lions in four seasons; McLean and Devore co-coached the last two games of the season, both losses. It was the only in-season coaching change in Packers history, until 2018. This season also marked the first season that the Packers played at the recently completed Milwaukee County Stadium.

== Offseason ==
=== NFL draft ===
Round	Pick	Player	Position	School/club team
1	7	Al Carmichael	Halfback	USC
2	19	Gil Reich	Back	Army/Kansas
3	31	Bill Forester	Linebacker	SMU
4	43	Gib Dawson	Halfback	Texas
5	55	Roger Zatkoff	Linebacker	Michigan
6	67	Bob Kennedy	Guard	Wisconsin
7	79	Jim Ringo	Center	Syracuse
8	91	Lauren Hargrove	Back	Georgia
9	103	Floyd Harrawood	Tackle	Tulsa
10	115	Vic Rimkus	Guard	Holy Cross
11	127	Joe Johnson	Halfback	Boston College
12	139	Dick Curran	Back	Arizona State
13	151	Bob Orders	Center	Army/West Virginia
14	163	Charley Wrenn	Tackle	TCU
15	175	Gene Helwig	Back	Tulsa
16	187	John Hlay	Fullback	Ohio State
17	199	Bill Georges	End	Texas
18	211	Jim Philee	Back	Bradley
19	223	Bill Lucky	Defensive tackle	Baylor
20	235	John Harville	Back	TCU
21	247	Bob Conway	Back	Alabama
22	259	Bill Turnbeaugh	Tackle	Auburn
23	271	Bill Murray	End	American International
24	283	James Haslam Jr.	Tackle	Tennessee
25	295	Ike Jones	End	UCLA
26	307	George Bozanic	Back	USC
27	319	Jim McConaughey	End	Houston
28	331	Zack Jordan	End	Colorado
29	343	John O'Brien	Guard	Boston College
30	355	Al Barry	Guard	USC

- Yellow indicates a future Pro Bowl selection
- Green indicates a future Pro Football Hall of Fame inductee

== Regular season ==
=== Schedule ===
Week	Date	Opponent	Result	Record	Venue	Attendance
1	September 27	Cleveland Browns	**L** 0–27	0–1	Milwaukee County Stadium	22,604
2	October 4	**Chicago Bears**	**L** 13–17	0–2	City Stadium	24,835
3	October 11	**Los Angeles Rams**	**L** 20–38	0–3	Milwaukee County Stadium	23,353
4	October 18	**Baltimore Colts**	**W** 37–14	1–3	City Stadium	18,713
5	October 24	at Pittsburgh Steelers	**L** 14–31	1–4	Forbes Field	22,918
6	October 31	at **Baltimore Colts**	**W** 35–24	2–4	Memorial Stadium	33,797
7	November 8	at **Chicago Bears**	**T** 21–21	2–4–1	Wrigley Field	39,889
8	November 15	**Detroit Lions**	**L** 7–14	2–5–1	City Stadium	20,834
9	November 22	**San Francisco 49ers**	**L** 7–37	2–6–1	Milwaukee County Stadium	16,378
10	November 26	at **Detroit Lions**	**L** 15–34	2–7–1	Briggs Stadium	52,607
11	December 6	at **San Francisco 49ers**	**L** 14–48	2–8–1	Kezar Stadium	31,337
12	December 12	at **Los Angeles Rams**	**L** 17–33	2–9–1	Los Angeles Memorial Coliseum	23,069
Note: Intra-conference opponents are in **bold** text.

=== Standings ===
NFL Western Conference
	W	L	T	PCT	CONF	PF	PA	STK
Detroit Lions	10	2	0	.833	8–2	271	205	W6
San Francisco 49ers	9	3	0	.750	8–2	372	237	W4
Los Angeles Rams	8	3	1	.727	7–3	366	236	W2
Chicago Bears	3	8	1	.273	2–7–1	218	262	L2
Baltimore Colts	3	9	0	.250	2–8	182	350	L7
Green Bay Packers	2	9	1	.182	2–7–1	200	338	L5

Note: Tie games were not officially counted in the standings until 1972.

== Roster ==
1953 Green Bay Packers final roster
Quarterbacks: 15 Babe Parilli; 18 Tobin Rote; Running backs: 20 Byron Bailey; 43 Don Barton S; 22 J. R. Boone CB; 42 Al Carmichael; 31 Fred Cone K; 26 Gib Dawson S; 37 Howie Ferguson; 24 Breezy Reid; Receivers: 86 Billy Howton; 87 Bob Mann; 81 Clive Rush P/S	Offensive linemen: 72 Dick Afflis T/MG; 62 Buddy Brown G; 73 Gus Cifelli T; 67 Dick Logan G; 61 Steve Ruzich G; 53 Dave Stephenson C; 68 Len Szafaryn T/G; Defensive linemen: 80 Carlton Elliott DE/WR; 69 Bill Forester MG/C; 77 Dave Hanner DT; 83 John Martinkovic DE; 70 Dick Wildung DT; 74 Roger Zatkoff DE/OLB	Linebackers: 8 Bob Forte; 66 Deral Teteak; 58 Clayton Tonnemaker; Defensive backs: 40 Ben Aldridge CB; 44 Bobby Dillon S; 48 Ace Loomis CB; 47 Val Joe Walker S	Reserve list: 88 George Hays DE (IR); 41 Marvin Johnson CB/S (IR); 51 Jim Ringo C (IR); Rookies in italics
