= 1953 Chicago Bears season =

NFL team season

- Owner: George Halas
- Head coach: George Halas
- Home stadium: Wrigley Field

Results
- Record: 3–8–1
- Division place: 4th NFL Western
- Playoffs: Did not qualify

The 1953 season was the Chicago Bears' 34th in the National Football League. The team failed to improve on their 5–7 record from 1952 and finished at 3–8–1 under head coach and owner George Halas, fourth place in the NFL's newly formed Western Conference. The Bears suffered consecutive losing seasons for the first time in the franchise's history. In the season finale, the Bears lost to the crosstown Cardinals, who were previously winless.

== Regular season ==
=== Schedule ===
| Week | Date | Opponent | Result | Record | Venue | Attendance |
|---|---|---|---|---|---|---|
| 1 | September 27 | at **Baltimore Colts** | **L** 9–13 | 0–1 | Memorial Stadium | 23,715 |
| 2 | October 4 | at **Green Bay Packers** | **W** 17–13 | 1–1 | City Stadium | 24,835 |
| 3 | October 11 | **Baltimore Colts** | **L** 14–16 | 1–2 | Wrigley Field | 35,316 |
| 4 | October 18 | **San Francisco 49ers** | **L** 28–35 | 1–3 | Wrigley Field | 36,909 |
| 5 | October 25 | at **Los Angeles Rams** | **L** 24–38 | 1–4 | L.A. Memorial Coliseum | 49,546 |
| 6 | November 1 | at **San Francisco 49ers** | **L** 14–24 | 1–5 | Kezar Stadium | 26,308 |
| 7 | November 8 | **Green Bay Packers** | **T** 21–21 | 1–5–1 | Wrigley Field | 39,889 |
| 8 | November 15 | at Washington Redskins | **W** 27–24 | 2–5–1 | Griffith Stadium | 21,392 |
| 9 | November 22 | **Detroit Lions** | **L** 16–20 | 2–6–1 | Wrigley Field | 36,165 |
| 10 | November 29 | **Los Angeles Rams** | **W** 24–21 | 3–6–1 | Wrigley Field | 31,626 |
| 11 | December 6 | at **Detroit Lions** | **L** 7–13 | 3–7–1 | Briggs Stadium | 58,056 |
| 12 | December 13 | Chicago Cardinals | **L** 17–24 | 3–8–1 | Wrigley Field | 38,059 |
Note: Intra-conference opponents are in **bold** text.

=== Standings ===
NFL Western Conference
| | W | L | T | PCT | CONF | PF | PA | STK |
|---|---|---|---|---|---|---|---|---|
| Detroit Lions | 10 | 2 | 0 | .833 | 8–2 | 271 | 205 | W6 |
| San Francisco 49ers | 9 | 3 | 0 | .750 | 8–2 | 372 | 237 | W4 |
| Los Angeles Rams | 8 | 3 | 1 | .727 | 7–3 | 366 | 236 | W2 |
| Chicago Bears | 3 | 8 | 1 | .273 | 2–7–1 | 218 | 262 | L2 |
| Baltimore Colts | 3 | 9 | 0 | .250 | 2–8 | 182 | 350 | L7 |
| Green Bay Packers | 2 | 9 | 1 | .182 | 2–7–1 | 200 | 338 | L5 |

Note: Tie games were not officially counted in the standings until 1972.

== Roster ==
Chicago Bears 1953 final roster
| Quarterbacks: 16 George Blanda; 10 Tommy O'Connell; Running backs: 32 Leon Campbell; 34 Kayo Dottley; 35 Bobby Jack Floyd; 89 John Hoffman CB; 25 Eddie Macon CB; 15 Fred Morrison P; 45 Billy Stone; Receivers: 43 Jim Dooley; 83 Bill McColl | Offensive linemen: 53 Billy Autrey C; 68 John Badaczewski G; 71 George Connor T; 70 Buddy Davis T; 72 Bill George G; 74 Kline Gilbert T; 51 Wayne Hansen C; 65 Johnny Hatley G; Defensive linemen: 73 Bill Bishop DT; 82 Dick Hensley DE/WR; 58 John Kreamcheck MG; 7 Ed Sprinkle DE; 86 Bill Wightkin DE/WR; 75 Fred Williams DT | Linebackers: 62 Frank Dempsey; 60 John Helwig; 23 Jerry Shipkey; 84 Bones Weatherly; Defensive backs: 46 Billy Anderson CB/WR; 6 Don Kindt S; 28 Loyd Lowe CB/WR; 22 S. J. Whitman S | Reserve list: -- Don Bingham RB (Military); -- Herman Clark MG (Military); -- Jack Hoffman DE (Military); -- Jimmy Lesane RB (Military); 48 Howie Livingston CB (IR); -- Brad Rowland RB (Military); -- Gene Schroeder WR (Military); Rookies in italics |
