= Jack Del Bello =

American football player (1927–2013)

No. 19
- Position: Quarterback

Personal information
- Born: December 9, 1927; Philadelphia, Pennsylvania, U.S.
- Died: August 23, 2013 (aged 85); Melbourne, Florida, U.S.
- Listed height: 6 ft 1 in (1.85 m)
- Listed weight: 190 lb (86 kg)

Career information
- High school: South Philadelphia
- College: Holy Cross, Miami (FL)
- NFL draft: 1951: undrafted

Career history
- Philadelphia Eagles (1953)*; Baltimore Colts (1953)
- * Offseason or practice squad member only

Career NFL statistics
- TD–INT: 1–5
- Passing yards: 229
- Passer rating: 25.9
- Stats at Pro Football Reference

Ameleto Vincent "Jack" Del Bello (December 9, 1927 – August 23, 2013) was an American professional football player who was a quarterback in the National Football League (NFL).

== Early life ==
Del Bello was born and grew up in South Philadelphia and attended South Philadelphia High School. As a senior, he helped lead the team to the 1945 Philadelphia City Championship at Franklin Field in front of 54,000 fans, throwing a touchdown pass and recovering a fumble on defense in an 18–13 win over West Philadelphia Catholic High School.

== College career ==
Del Bello played one year at the College of the Holy Cross before transferring to the University of Miami. He played quarterback, halfback, and defensive back for the Hurricanes. He led the Hurricanes in passing yards and points scored as a sophomore in 1948 and passes intercepted as a junior and as a senior. In his last collegiate game, Del Bello intercepted a pass that set up a scoring drive in the team's one-point loss to Clemson in the 1951 Orange Bowl.

== Professional career ==
Del Bello was drafted into the U.S. Army immediately after graduation. He was stationed at Fort Jackson and was the starting quarterback for the base's football team. After being discharged in 1953, Del Bello was signed by his hometown Philadelphia Eagles but was cut during training camp. He was signed by the Baltimore Colts in on October 21, 1953, after reserve quarterback Dick Flowers suffered a season-ending injury. Del Bello shared quarterbacking duties with starter George Taliaferro for the final four games of the Colts's inaugural season, completing 27 of 61 pass attempts for 229 yards with one touchdown and five interceptions.

== Post-football career ==
Del Bello retired from football after the 1953 season. He and his wife, Betty, accepted teaching positions in North Miami, Florida. Del Bello taught physical education and driver education and coached football at North Miami High School from 1954 to 1986. He died on August 23, 2013.
