= Jim Cain (defensive end) =

American gridiron football player (1927–2001)

No. 43, 53, 88, 73
- Position: Defensive end

Personal information
- Born: October 1, 1927; Eudora, Arkansas, U.S.
- Died: October 5, 2001 (aged 74)
- Listed height: 6 ft 1 in (1.85 m)
- Listed weight: 202 lb (92 kg)

Career information
- High school: Eudora
- College: Alabama (1945–1948)
- NFL draft: 1949: 7th round, 70th overall pick

Career history
- Chicago Cardinals (1949); Detroit Lions (1950, 1953–1955); Calgary Stampeders (1956)

Awards and highlights
- NFL champion (1953)

Career NFL statistics
- Games played: 60
- Games started: 48
- Fumble recoveries: 11
- Stats at Pro Football Reference

James Edgar Cain Jr. (October 1, 1927 – October 5, 2001) was an American professional football defensive end who played five seasons in the National Football League (NFL) with the Chicago Cardinals and Detroit Lions. He was selected by the Cardinals in the seventh round of the 1949 NFL draft after playing college football at the University of Alabama. Cain was also a member of the Calgary Stampeders of the Western Interprovincial Football Union (WIFU).

== Early life and college ==
James Edgar Cain Jr. was born on October 1, 1927, in Eudora, Arkansas. He attended Eudora High School in Eudora.

Cain was a four-year letterman for the Alabama Crimson Tide of the University of Alabama from 1945 to 1948. He caught eight passes for 88 yards in 1945 and seven passes for 98 yards in 1946.

== Professional career ==
Cain was selected by the Chicago Cardinals in the seventh round, with the 70th overall pick, of the 1949 NFL draft. He officially signed with the team on February 12, 1949. He played in all 12 games for the Cardinals during his rookie year in 1949, and recovered two fumbles.

In June 1950, Cain, Clarence Self, and Ray Stackhouse were traded to the Detroit Lions for Frank Tripucka. Cain started all 12 games for the Lions in 1950, recording one reception for eight yards and two fumble recoveries, one of which he returned for a touchdown. The Lions finished the 1950 season with a 6–6 record. Cain then served in the United States Army during the Korean War. He played in 12 games, starting 11, in 1953 and recovered three fumbles. He also started for the Lions in the 1953 NFL Championship Game, posting one sack, as Detroit beat the Cleveland Browns by a score of 17–16. Cain started all 12 games during the 1954 season, totaling two fumble recoveries. He also started in the NFL Championship Game for the second year in a row, but this time the Browns beat the Lions 56–10. Cain appeared in all 12 games again in 1955, starting 11, and recovered two fumbles. The Lions finished the 1955 season with a 3–9 record. Cain was waived by the Lions on August 16, 1956.

Cain then dressed in four games for the Calgary Stampeders of the Western Interprovincial Football Union during the 1956 season.

== Personal life ==
Cain died on October 5, 2001.
