= 1954 All-Pro Team =

Official list of the best NFL players in 1954

The 1954 All-Pro Team consisted of the best players at each position among players in the National Football League as chosen by various selectors.

The 1954 Cleveland Browns won the NFL championship. Five Cleveland players received first-team honors from at least one selector. Cleveland's honorees were: tackle Lou Groza, guard Abe Gibron; quarterback Otto Graham; defensive end Len Ford; and defensive tackle John Kissell.

Eight members of the Detroit Lions received first-team honors.

The All-Pro selectors included:

- Associated Press (AP)
- Newspaper Enterprise Association (NEA), "chosen by balloters from all cities in the circuit"
- United Press (UP)
- The Sporting News (TSN), selecting a single team of eleven players
- New York Daily News (NYDN)

Players receiving first-team honors from three of the five selectors are shown in bold.

== Offense ==
=== Ends ===
- **Pete Pihos**, Philadelphia Eagles (AP, UP-1, TSN, NYDN-2)
- **Harlon Hill**, Chicago Bears (NEA-1, UP-1, TSN, NYDN-1)
- **Bob Boyd**, Los Angeles Rams (AP, NEA-1, UP-2, NYDN-1)
- Dorne Dibble, Detroit Lions (NEA-2)
- Billy Wilson, San Francisco 49ers (NEA-2, UP-2, NYDN-2)

=== Tackles ===
- **Lou Creekmur**, Detroit Lions (AP, NEA-2, UP-1, TSN, NYDN-1)
- **Lou Groza**, Cleveland Browns (AP, NEA-1, UP-1, TSN, NYDN-1)
- Bob St. Clair, San Francisco 49ers (NEA-1, UP-2)
- Ken Snyder, Philadelphia Eagles (NEA-2, UP-2, NYDN-2)

=== Guards ===
- **Dick Stanfel**, Detroit Lions (AP, NEA-1, UP-1, NYDN-1)
- **Bruno Banducci**, San Francisco 49ers (AP, UP-1, TSN, NYDN-1)
- Abe Gibron, Cleveland Browns (NEA-1, UP-2)
- George Connor, Chicago Bears (UP-2)
- Duane Putnam, Los Angeles Rams (NEA-2)
- Marv Berschet, Washington Redskins (NEA-2)

=== Centers ===
- **Bill Walsh**, Pittsburgh Steelers (AP, NEA-1, UP-1, NYDN-2)
- Bill Johnson, San Francisco 49ers (NEA-2, NYDN-1)
- Frank Gatski, Cleveland Browns (UP-2)

=== Quarterbacks ===
- **Otto Graham**, Cleveland Browns (AP, NEA-2, UP-1, TSN [back], NYDN-1)
- Bobby Layne, Detroit Lions (AP-2, NEA-1, UP-2)
- Norm Van Brocklin, Los Angeles Rams (NYDN-2)

=== Halfbacks ===
- **Doak Walker**, Detroit Lions (AP, NEA-1, UP-1, TSN [back], NYDN-1)
- **Ollie Matson**, Chicago Cardinals (AP, NEA-1, UP-1, TSN [back], NYDN-1 [defensive halfback])
- Hugh McElhenny, San Francisco 49ers (NEA-2, UP-2, NYDN-1)
- John Henry Johnson, San Francisco 49ers (NEA-2, UP-2, NYDN-2)
- Billy Wells, Washington Redskins (NEA-2)

=== Fullbacks ===
- **Joe Perry**, San Francisco 49ers (AP, NEA-1, UP-1 TSN [back], NYDN-1)
- Dan Towler, Los Angeles Rams (NEA-2)
- Paul "Tank" Younger, Los Angeles Rams (UP-2)
- Bill Bowman, Detroit Lions (NYDN-2)

== Defense ==
=== Defensive ends ===
- **Len Ford**, Cleveland Browns (AP, NEA-1, UP-1, NYDN-1)
- **Norm Willey**, Philadelphia Eagles (AP, NEA-1, UP-1, NYDN-1)
- Ed Sprinkle, Chicago Bears (NEA-2)
- Andy Robustelli, Los Angeles Rams (NEA-2, UP-2, NYDN-2)
- Leon Hart, Detroit Lions (UP-2)
- John Martinkovic, Green Bay Packers (NYDN-2)

=== Defensive tackles ===
- **Leo Nomellini**, San Francisco 49ers (AP, NEA-1, UP-1, NYDN-1)
- Art Donovan, Baltimore Colts (AP, UP-1, NYDN-2)
- Ray Krouse, New York Giants (NEA-2, NYDN-1)
- John Kissell, Cleveland Browns (NEA-1)
- Dave Hanner, Green Bay Packers (NEA-2)
- Ernie Stautner, Pittsburgh Steelers (UP-2, NYDN-2)
- Don Colo, Cleveland Browns (UP-2)

=== Middle guards ===
- **Les Bingaman**, Detroit Lions (AP, NEA-2, UP-1, TSN [guard], NYDN-1)
- Dale Dodrill, Pittsburgh Steelers (AP, NEA-1, UP-2, NYDN-2)
- Bucko Kilroy, Philadelphia Eagles (UP-1)
- Mike McCormack, Cleveland Browns (UP-2)

=== Linebackers ===
- **Chuck Bednarik**, Philadelphia Eagles (AP, UP-1, TSN [center], NYDN-1)
- Roger Zatkoff, Green Bay Packers (UP-1, NEA-1)
- Joe Schmidt, Detroit Lions (AP, UP-2, NYDN-2)
- Wayne Robinson, Philadelphia Eagles (NEA-1)
- Clayton Tonnemaker, Green Bay Packers (UP-2, NYDN-1)
- Don Paul, Los Angeles Rams (NEA-2)
- LaVern Torgeson, Detroit Lions (NEA-2, NYDN-2)

=== Defensive halfbacks ===
- **Tom Landry**, New York Giants (AP, NEA-1, UP-1, NYDN-2)
- Jim David, Detroit Lions (AP-2, UP-1, NYDN-1)
- Night Train Lane, Chicago Cardinals (NEA-1, UP-2, NYDN-2)
- Warren Lahr, Cleveland Browns (NEA-2, UP-2)
- Tom Keane, Baltimore Colts (NEA-2)

=== Safeties ===
- **Jack Christiansen**, Detroit Lions (AP, NEA-1, UP-1, NYDN-1)
- Bobby Dillon, Green Bay Packers (AP [defensive halfback], NEA-1, NYDN-2)
- Emlen Tunnell, New York Giants (NEA-2, UP-2, NYDN-1)
- Jerry Norton, Philadelphia Eagles (NEA-2)
- Tommy James, Cleveland Browns (NYDN-2)
