= Bob Boyd (American football) =

American football player (1928–2009)

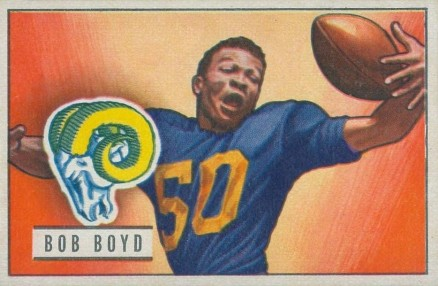
- Boyd on a 1951 Bowman football card

No. 80, 82
- Positions: End, defensive back

Personal information
- Born: March 7, 1928; Riverside, California, U.S.
- Died: May 17, 2009 (aged 81); California City, California, U.S.
- Listed height: 6 ft 2 in (1.88 m)
- Listed weight: 201 lb (91 kg)

Career information
- High school: Riverside Polytechnic
- College: Loyola (CA) (1947–1949)
- NFL draft: 1950: undrafted

Career history
- Los Angeles Rams (1950–1957)

Awards and highlights
- NFL champion (1951); First-team All-Pro (1954); Pro Bowl (1954); NFL receiving yards leader (1954); Loyola Marymount Hall of Fame (1986)

Career NFL statistics
- Receptions: 176
- Receiving yards: 3,611
- Receiving touchdowns: 28
- Stats at Pro Football Reference

Robert Barrett Boyd (March 7, 1928 – May 14, 2009) was an American professional football player who was an end and defensive back for eight seasons with the Los Angeles Rams of the National Football League (NFL). His most spectacular season was in 1954, when he caught 53 passes for 1,212 yards and 6 touchdowns.

While at Loyola Marymount University, Boyd won the 100-yard dash at the 1950 NCAA Championships.

== NFL career statistics ==
Legend
	Led the league
**Bold**	Career best

Year	Team	Games		Receiving					Fumbles
Year	Team	GP	GS	Rec	Yds	Avg	Lng	TD	Fumbles
1950	LAR	**12**	0	9	220	24.4	72	4	0
1951	LAR	**12**	7	9	128	14.2	28	1	0
1953	LAR	**12**	7	24	548	22.8	70	4	0
1954	LAR	**12**	**11**	**53**	**1,212**	**22.9**	**80**	6	2
1955	LAR	7	6	22	383	17.4	74	3	0
1956	LAR	**12**	4	30	586	19.5	61	**7**	**3**
1957	LAR	**12**	9	29	534	18.4	51	3	2
Career		79	44	176	3,611	20.5	80	28	7
