= Dick Stanfel =

American football player and coach (1927–2015)

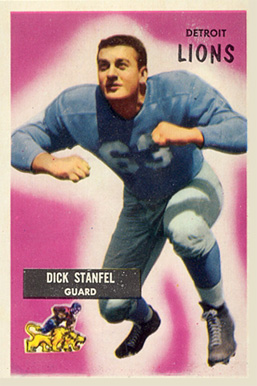
- Stanfel on 1955 Bowman football card

No. 63, 60
- Position: Guard

Personal information
- Born: July 20, 1927; San Francisco, California, U.S.
- Died: June 22, 2015 (aged 87); Libertyville, Illinois, U.S.
- Listed height: 6 ft 3 in (1.91 m)
- Listed weight: 236 lb (107 kg)

Career information
- High school: Commerce (San Francisco)
- College: San Francisco (1948–1950)
- NFL draft: 1951: 2nd round, 19th overall pick

Career history

Playing
- Detroit Lions (1952–1955); Washington Redskins (1956–1958)

Coaching
- Notre Dame (1959–1962) Line coach; California (1963) Offensive line coach; Philadelphia Eagles (1964–1970) Offensive line coach; San Francisco 49ers (1971–1974) Offensive line coach; San Francisco 49ers (1975) Offensive coordinator; New Orleans Saints (1976–1979) Offensive line coach; New Orleans Saints (1980) Interim head coach & offensive line coach; Chicago Bears (1981–1992) Offensive line coach; New Orleans Saints (1997–1998) Offensive line coach

Awards and highlights
- As a player: 2× NFL champion (1952, 1953); 5× First-team All-Pro (1953, 1954, 1956-1958); 5× Pro Bowl (1953, 1955–1958); NFL 1950s All-Decade Team; Pride of the Lions; Detroit Lions All-Time Team; First-team All-PCC (1950); As a coach: Super Bowl champion (XX)

Career NFL statistics
- Games played: 73
- Games started: 72
- Fumble recoveries: 3
- Stats at Pro Football Reference

Head coaching record
- Career: 1–3 (.250)
- Coaching profile at Pro Football Reference
- Pro Football Hall of Fame

Richard Anthony Stanfel (July 20, 1927 – June 22, 2015) was an American professional football player and coach in the National Football League (NFL). He played as a guard, and his college and professional career spanned more than 50 years from 1948 to 1998. He was inducted into the Pro Football Hall of Fame as a player in 2016. He was also named to the NFL 1950s All-Decade Team.

A native of San Francisco, Stanfel served in the United States Army and later played college football on both offense and defense for the San Francisco Dons from 1948 to 1950. He was selected as a first-team All-Coast defensive guard in 1950.

Stanfel was selected by the Detroit Lions with the 19th pick in the 1951 NFL draft, missed the 1951 season due to injury, and then played four seasons for the Detroit Lions from 1952 to 1955 and three seasons for the Washington Redskins from 1956 to 1958. He was a key offensive player on the Lions 1952 and 1953 NFL championship teams and was named the Most Valuable Player on the 1953 team. He was selected by the Associated Press as a first-team All-NFL player in five of his seven NFL seasons and played in five Pro Bowls.

Stanfel also spent more than 35 years as a football coach, principally as an offensive line coach. His coaching career included stints with the Notre Dame Fighting Irish (1959–1962), the California Golden Bears (1963), the Philadelphia Eagles (1964–1970), the San Francisco 49ers (1971–1975), the New Orleans Saints (1976–1980, 1997–1998), and the Chicago Bears (1981–1992). Bears head coach Mike Ditka called Stanfel the best offensive line coach in football after the Bears led the NFL in rushing three straight years and won Super Bowl XX.

== Early life and college ==
Stanfel was born in San Francisco in 1927 and attended the High School of Commerce there. At Commerce, he played on the football team as a blocking back. He enrolled at San Francisco Junior College in the fall of 1946 and played football while changing his position to guard. After a year of junior college, Stanfel served as a signal corpsman in the United States Army for a year-and-a-half.

After his military service, Stanfel attended the University of San Francisco (USF) where he played college football from 1948 to 1950 on both offense and defense for the San Francisco Dons football team under head coach Joe Kuharich. At USF, Stanfel was a blocker for Ollie Matson and a teammate of Gino Marchetti and Bob St. Clair. (All four went on to be inducted into the Pro Football Hall of Fame.) At the end of the 1950 season, Stanfel was selected by the Associated Press as a first-team defensive guard on the All-Coast football team, by the United Press as a first-team player on its independent conference all-star team, and as a member of the west team in the East–West Shrine Game. He was credited with opening numerous holes for Kyle Rote in the Shrine Game.

== Professional playing career ==
=== Detroit Lions ===
In January 1951, Stanfel was drafted by the Detroit Lions in the second round, 19th overall pick, of the 1951 NFL draft. He was the first player drafted by head coach Buddy Parker after he became the Lions' head coach. In August 1951, Stanfel was hit from the side in a scrimmage while practicing in Wisconsin for the Chicago College All-Star Game, seriously injuring his left knee. As a result of the injury, Stanfel underwent knee surgery and did not play during the 1951 season. Stanfel later recalled: "For a solid year I worked with weights, took exercises and swam to strengthen the knee."

After recuperating from his knee injury, Stanfel made his NFL debut for the 1952 Detroit Lions, a team that compiled a 9–3 record, ranked second in the NFL with an average of 28.7 points scored per game, and defeated the Cleveland Browns in the 1952 NFL Championship Game. In November 1952, after the Lions rushed for a season-high 321 yards against the Pittsburgh Steelers, the Detroit Free Press published an article crediting Stanfel as a key to the running game. Assistant coach Aldo Forte said, "Stanfel's play at guard was the chief contribution to our great running game. He loves to play football and enjoys the game the rougher it gets." George Wilson added: "We feel that Stanfel is one of the best, if not THE best offensive guard in pro football today. He's fast, rangy and can block extremely well. He not only holds the players out of there; he knocks them down and then goes hunting for more."

In his second NFL season, Stanfel played for the 1953 Lions team that repeated as NFL champion, compiling a 10–2 record and again defeating the Browns in the 1953 NFL Championship Game. At the end of the 1953 regular season, the Lions players voted Stanfel as the team's most valuable player. Assistant coach Forte in December 1953 called Stanfel the best guard in the NFL, and Stanfel said that the MVP honor was "the biggest thrill I've ever received in football." He was also selected as a Pro Bowl player and was named a first-team All-NFL player by both the Associated Press (AP) and United Press (UP).

In the spring of 1954, the Calgary Stampeders sought to lure Stanfel to the Canadian Football League with an offer to pay 20% more than his $7,000 salary with the Lions. Stanfel instead signed a new contract with the Lions in May 1954 for an estimated salary of $8,500. After a strong start to the 1954 season, Stanfel missed the last five games of the regular season with a back injury. In Stanfel's absence, the Lions lost to the Bears and played the Eagles to a tie. Stanfel returned to the lineup days before the NFL Championship Game. At the time of Stanfel's return, Lions head coach Buddy Parker called him "the best blocking back in the NFL." The 1954 Lions compiled a 9–2–1 record and won the NFL Western Conference championship before losing to the Browns in the 1954 NFL Championship Game. For the second consecutive season, Stanfel was selected as a first-team All-NFL player by both the AP and UP.

The 1955 Lions fell to 3–9, as Stanfel was injured twice, the later time suffering a spinal injury that took him out of the lineup for three weeks. Despite the injuries, Stanfel remained one of the top offensive linemen in the NFL and was chosen to play in his second Pro Bowl after the 1955 season.

=== Washington Redskins ===
In April 1956, the Lions traded Stanfel to the Washington Redskins in exchange for Dick Alban. Joe Kuharich, who had been Stanfel's college coach at USF, was hired as the Redskins' head coach in 1954 and engineered the trade to acquire his former All-Coast lineman. Stanfel played for Kuharich's Redskins for three seasons from 1956 to 1958. The Redskins did not register a winning season during Stanfel's tenure with the team, compiling records of 6–6 in 1956, 5–6–1 in 1957, and 4–7–1 in 1958. Despite the team's subpar performance, Stanfel earned first-team All-NFL honors from the AP and UP all three years he was with the Redskins. In December 1958, after the end of the season, Kuharich left the Redskins and took over as head coach of the Notre Dame Fighting Irish football team. Within days, the press began to speculate that Stanfel, who had suffered multiple injuries during the 1958 season, would take a coaching position with Kuharich at Notre Dame.

== Coaching career ==
=== Notre Dame ===
In January 1959, Stanfel retired as a player and was hired as an assistant line coach at Notre Dame under Joe Kuharich, who had been Stanfel's head coach both at USF and with the Redskins. He remained an assistant coach at Notre Dame for four years. Notre Dame compiled records of 5–5, 2–8, 5–5, and 5–5 in four years under Kuharich and Stanfel. Kuharich was the only head coach in Notre Dame football history to compile a losing record (17–23) over his career with the program.

=== California ===
In January 1963, Stanfel was hired as the offensive line coach for the California Golden Bears football team. He was an assistant at Cal under head coach Marv Levy. Levy resigned as Cal's head coach in December 1963, and Stanfel was rumored at the time to be a leading candidate to take over as the new head coach. Levy, who also coached with Stanfel on the Philadelphia Eagles' staff in 1969, later wrote about Stanfel: "When it came to teaching fundamental line techniques, Dick Stanfel had no peer. . . . Many people who played or who closely observed professional football in the 1950s . . . feel he is the best offensive lineman to have ever played the game."

=== Philadelphia Eagles ===
In March 1964, Stanfel renewed his professional relationship with Kuharich, who had been hired as the head coach of the Philadelphia Eagles. Kuharich hired Stanfel as the Eagles' offensive line coach. With quarterback Norm Snead joining Kuharich and Stanfel in moving from the Redskins to the Eagles in 1964, the Eagles initially ranked among the NFL's offensive leaders, finishing fourth in yards gained in 1965 and second in 1966. However, the defense lagged, and the Eagles compiled records of 6–8 and 5–9 in 1964 and 1965. In 1966, the team improved to 9–5, but fell to 6–7–1 in 1967 and 2–12 in 1968. Kuharich left the Eagles after the 1968 season, but Stanfel remained with the club through the 1970 season.

=== San Francisco 49ers ===
In February 1971, Stanfel returned to his home city as an assistant coach with the San Francisco 49ers under head coach Dick Nolan. He remained with the 49ers through the 1975 season, holding positions as offensive line coach and taking over in 1975 as the offensive coordinator. In the five years that Stanfel was on the staff, the 49ers compiled records of 9–5 in 1971, 8–5–1 in 1972, 5–9 in 1973, 6–8 in 1974, and 5–9 in 1975.

=== New Orleans Saints ===
In February 1976, Stanfel was hired as Hank Stram's offensive line coach with the New Orleans Saints. Dick Nolan, under whom Stanfel served in San Francisco, took over as the Saints' head coach in 1978. The Saints compiled records of 4–10 in 1976, 3–11 in 1977, 7–9 in 1978, and 8–8 in 1979. When the 1980 Saints lost their first 12 games, Nolan was fired and Stanfel took over as interim head coach for the final four games of the 1980 season. The Saints compiled a 1–3 record under Stanfel.

=== Chicago Bears ===
In February 1981, Stanfel was hired by Neill Armstrong as the offensive line coach for the Chicago Bears. He remained with the Bears when Mike Ditka took over as head coach in 1982. He remained with the Bears throughout Ditka's tenure with the team which lasted through the 1992 season. Stanfel was credited with helping to establish a solid offensive line that helped the 1985 Chicago Bears win Super Bowl XX. After the 1985 season, Ditka noted that the Bears had led the NFL in rushing for three straight years, gave credit to Stanfel, and called him "the best offensive line coach in football."

=== New Orleans Saints ===
When Ditka was hired as the head coach of the New Orleans Saints in 1997, he persuaded Stanfel, then 70 years old, to come out of retirement as the Saints' offensive line coach. Stanfel said at the time that it was his respect for Ditka that lured him back to coaching: "I respect the man. He's a hell of a coach. I think he's an honest person and a fair man, and he asked me to come back. . . . He's always been good to me, and we've coached a long time together. In fact, I coached him when he was a player a couple years (with the Eagles), so I think there's a feeling for the both of us . . ." Stanfel announced his retirement from the Saints in January 1999.

=== Head coaching record ===
Team	Year	Regular season					Postseason			
Team	Year	Won	Lost	Ties	Win %	Finish	Won	Lost	Win %	Result
NO	1980	1	3	0	.250	4th in NFC West	–	–	–	–
Total		1	3	0	.250					

== Later years and legacy ==
In 1969, Stanfel was selected as an offensive guard on the NFL's 1950s All-Decade Team. He was selected as a finalist for the Pro Football Hall of Fame in both 1993 and 2012, but failed to garner sufficient support.

Stanfel died at age 87 in June 2015 at his home in Libertyville, Illinois, a suburb of Chicago.

In February 2016, Stanfel was posthumously elected to the Hall of Fame. The induction ceremony took place in August 2016.
