= Hal Ledyard =

American gridiron football player (1931–1973)

No. 12, 85, 10
- Position: Quarterback

Personal information
- Born: July 7, 1931; Montgomery, Alabama, U.S.
- Died: April 21, 1973 (aged 41); Big Sur, California, U.S.
- Listed height: 6 ft 0 in (1.83 m)
- Listed weight: 185 lb (84 kg)

Career information
- High school: Chattanooga (Chattanooga, Tennessee)
- College: Tennessee-Chattanooga (1948–1952)
- NFL draft: 1953: 9th round, 104th overall pick

Career history
- San Francisco 49ers (1953); Ottawa Rough Riders (1956–1958); Winnipeg Blue Bombers (1961–1965); Saskatchewan Roughriders (1965)

Awards and highlights
- 2× Grey Cup champion (1961, 1962)

Career NFL statistics
- TD-INT: 0–1
- Stats at Pro Football Reference

Harold Ledyard (July 7, 1931 – April 21, 1973) was an American professional football player in the National Football League (NFL) and Canadian Football League (CFL).

After backing up future Pro Football Hall of Famer Y. A. Tittle in 1953, Ledyard joined the United States Army, where he played quarterback for the Fort Jackson base football team in 1955. Ledyard joined the Ottawa Rough Riders in 1956 and spent three seasons as the team's starting quarterback before being replaced by Frank Tripucka before the 1959 season. Ledyard signed with the Toronto Argonauts in 1959, but was waived before the season began.

Following his release, Ledyard joined the Sarnia Golden Bears of the Ontario Rugby Football Union, a semi-pro football league based in Canada. He threw for 1142 yards and eight touchdown passes and helped the team win the 1959 league championship. The following year he led all ORFU passers with 1402 yards and 15 touchdown passes, but Sarnia finished last in the league with a 3–7 record.

Ledyard returned to the CFL in 1961 with the Winnipeg Blue Bombers, splitting playing time with Dick Thornton and future Canadian Football Hall of Famer Ken Ploen. During his time in Winnipeg, Ledyard was known as "The best relief pitcher in football" due to his success relieving Ploen. He was a part of the Blue Bomber teams that won the 49th and 50th Grey Cups.

Hal Ledyard is the father of retired professional hockey player Grant Ledyard.

Ledyard died April 21, 1973, in a drowning accident at Big Sur.
