= Jack Manley =

American football player (1929–2014)

No. 54
- Position: Center / Linebacker

Personal information
- Born: September 20, 1929; Town Creek, Alabama
- Died: November 25, 2014 (aged 85); Rogersville, Alabama
- Listed height: 6 ft 3 in (1.91 m)
- Listed weight: 215 lb (98 kg)

Career information
- High school: Hazlewood (Town Creek, Alabama)
- College: Mississippi State

Career history
- San Francisco 49ers (1953)
- Stats at Pro Football Reference

Joseph Jackson Manley (September 20, 1929 – November 25, 2014) was an American football center who played for the San Francisco 49ers. He played college football at Mississippi State University, having previously attended Hazelwood High School in Alabama.
