= Dick Alban =

American football player (1929–2016)

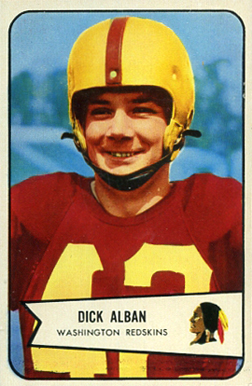

No. 42
- Position: Defensive back

Personal information
- Born: January 17, 1929; Hanover, Pennsylvania, U.S.
- Died: April 8, 2016 (aged 87); Newtown Township, Pennsylvania, U.S.
- Listed height: 6 ft 0 in (1.83 m)
- Listed weight: 193 lb (88 kg)

Career information
- High school: LaPorte (La Porte, Indiana)
- College: Northwestern
- NFL draft: 1952: 9th round, 103rd overall pick

Career history
- Washington Redskins (1952–1955); Pittsburgh Steelers (1956–1959)

Awards and highlights
- Pro Bowl (1954)

Career NFL statistics
- Interceptions: 30
- Fumble recoveries: 6
- Stats at Pro Football Reference

Richard Herbert Alban (January 17, 1929 – April 8, 2016) was an American professional football defensive back who played eight seasons for the Washington Redskins and Pittsburgh Steelers in the National Football League (NFL). Alban played college football at Northwestern University, where he was used at halfback and on defense.

Alban was selected in the ninth round of the 1952 NFL draft and started all 12 games for the Redskins his rookie year. His best season came in 1954, where he finished second in the league in interceptions with nine and was selected to his only Pro Bowl. He was traded to the Steelers in 1956 and retired after the 1959 campaign.

== Early life and college ==
Alban was born in Hanover, Pennsylvania, and attended La Porte High School in La Porte, Indiana, where he graduated in 1948. While in La Porte, Alban was named to the United Press International All-State football team in 1946 and 1947. For his accomplishments, Alban was later inducted to the Indiana Football Hall of Fame in 1980.

Alban played college football for Northwestern between 1949 and 1951. Alban joined a team that won the Rose Bowl the previous year. He was injured at the start of his first season, however, Alban caught a 29-yard touchdown pass from quarterback Don Burson in a 38–20 victory against Colgate University on November 12.

He teamed up with Chuck Hren at halfback for the 1951 campaign. He rushed for 101 yards, including a 69-yard carry for a touchdown during an October 20 victory over Navy. He was selected to participate as a member of the East squad in the East–West Shrine Game and as a member of the North squad at the Senior Bowl at years' end.

== Professional career ==
In 1954, Alban had nine interceptions and was selected to his only Pro Bowl. On April 24, 1956, Alban was traded to the Detroit Lions for Dick Stanfel. The Lions then traded him to the Pittsburgh Steelers for offensive tackle Dick Modzelewski. In 1958, Alban had five interceptions for 25 yards and a forced fumble. Three of the interceptions came in a 24–16 win against his old team the Redskins on November 2. He finished fourth in the league with six interceptions in 1959. During an October 11 loss against the Philadelphia Eagles, Alban returned an interception for 46 yards, the longest in his career. He announced his retirement at the end of the year.

He finished his career with 30 interceptions in 96 games played. He died on April 8, 2016, at the age of 87.

== Personal life ==
Alban later became an executive for an athletic clothing manufacturer in Memphis, Tennessee.
