= Don Barton =

American football player (1930–2006)

No. 28
- Position: Halfback

Personal information
- Born: May 29, 1930; Cisco, Texas, U.S.
- Died: July 16, 2006 (aged 76); Tyler, Texas, U.S.
- Listed height: 5 ft 11 in (1.80 m)
- Listed weight: 175 lb (79 kg)

Career information
- High school: Longview (TX)
- College: Texas

Career history
- Green Bay Packers (1953)

Awards and highlights
- 1950 Southwest Conference Champion

Career statistics
- Games played: 5
- Stats at Pro Football Reference

Donald Reid Barton (May 29, 1930 – July 16, 2006) was an American football player and coach who played halfback in the National Football League for the Green Bay Packers in 1953.

== Early life ==
Barton was born in Cisco, Texas in 1930. He attended Longview High School.

== College career ==
Barton played college football at Kemper Military School in 1948 and 1949 and then at the University of Texas in 1950 and 1951. In 1950 he helped the Longhorns win the Southwest Conference Championship, go to the Cotton Bowl and finish the season ranked #2 in the coaches poll.

He was also on the baseball team.

== Career ==
Barton played 5 games with the Green Bay Packers during the 1953 NFL season and gained 118 all-purpose yards running, receiving and returning the ball. At the end of the season he was released by the Packers.

== Later life ==
Following the 1953-54 season, Barton was drafted into the Army where he served as a 1st Lieutenant in the Fort Knox, Kentucky, Armored Division. Following his service he became a football coach.

Barton began his coaching career in Sherman as an Assistant Coach and from there went on to be a head coach in El Paso, Corpus Christi, Atlanta, and finally Robert E. Lee High School in Tyler. During his last year at Robert E. Lee, he became the Vice President of Texas High School Coaches Association. He then became the athletic director of Tyler Independent School District in 1973 and retired in 1988.

He died in 2006 in Tyler, Texas.
