= Grant Ledyard =

Canadian ice hockey player (born 1961)

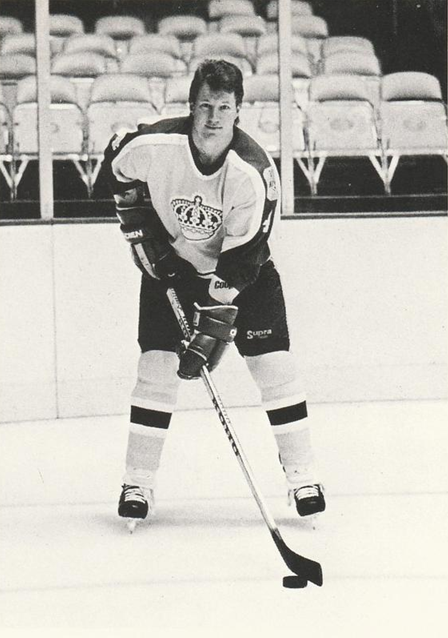
- Born: November 19, 1961 (age 64) Winnipeg, Manitoba, Canada
- Height: 6 ft 2 in (188 cm)
- Weight: 200 lb (91 kg; 14 st 4 lb)
- Position: Defence
- Shot: Left
- Played for: New York Rangers; Los Angeles Kings; Washington Capitals; Buffalo Sabres; Dallas Stars; Vancouver Canucks; Boston Bruins; Ottawa Senators; Tampa Bay Lightning
- National team: Canada
- Playing career: 1984–2002

Grant Stuart Ledyard (born November 19, 1961) is a Canadian former professional ice hockey defenceman. Beginning his career in 1984 as an undrafted free agent, Ledyard spent 18 seasons in the National Hockey League (NHL) as a journeyman; he played at least one game with nine NHL teams over the course of his career.

== Playing career ==
As a youth, Ledyard played in the 1974 Quebec International Pee-Wee Hockey Tournament with a minor ice hockey team from Winnipeg.

Ledyard made his NHL debut in the 1984–85 season with the New York Rangers. A journeyman, he played with nine NHL teams during his career. He spent the most time with the Buffalo Sabres and the Dallas Stars, four full seasons each. He also played for the Los Angeles Kings, Washington Capitals, Vancouver Canucks, Boston Bruins, Ottawa Senators, and Tampa Bay Lightning. His last NHL season came with the Lightning in the 2001–02 season. In his NHL career, Ledyard appeared in 1,028 regular season games. He scored 90 goals and added 276 assists. In addition, he played in 83 Stanley Cup playoff games, scoring 6 goals and tallying 12 assists.

== Personal life ==
Ledyard currently lives in the Buffalo area, and was recently awarded the head coach position of the Buffalo Junior Sabres.

In 2016, Ledyard and 12 other ex-NHL players joined a class action lawsuit against the NHL for failing to protect its players against brain injuries.

He is the son of former CFL and NFL football player Hal Ledyard.

== Career statistics ==
=== Regular season and playoffs ===
			Regular season					Playoffs
Season	Team	League	GP	G	A	Pts	PIM	GP	G	A	Pts	PIM
1979–80	Fort Garry Blues	MJHL	49	13	24	37	90	—	—	—	—	—
1980–81	Saskatoon Blades	WHL	71	9	28	37	148	—	—	—	—	—
1981–82	Fort Garry Blues	MJHL	63	25	45	70	150	—	—	—	—	—
1982–83	Tulsa Oilers	CHL	80	13	29	42	115	—	—	—	—	—
1983–84	Tulsa Oilers	CHL	58	9	17	26	71	9	5	4	9	10
1984–85	New Haven Nighthawks	AHL	36	6	20	26	18	—	—	—	—	—
1984–85	New York Rangers	NHL	42	8	12	20	53	3	0	2	2	4
1985–86	New York Rangers	NHL	27	2	9	11	20	—	—	—	—	—
1985–86	Los Angeles Kings	NHL	52	7	18	25	78	—	—	—	—	—
1986–87	Los Angeles Kings	NHL	67	14	23	37	93	5	0	0	0	10
1987–88	New Haven Nighthawks	AHL	3	2	1	3	4	—	—	—	—	—
1987–88	Los Angeles Kings	NHL	23	1	7	8	52	—	—	—	—	—
1987–88	Washington Capitals	NHL	21	4	3	7	14	14	1	0	1	30
1988–89	Washington Capitals	NHL	61	3	11	14	43	—	—	—	—	—
1988–89	Buffalo Sabres	NHL	13	1	5	6	8	5	1	2	3	2
1989–90	Buffalo Sabres	NHL	67	2	13	15	37	—	—	—	—	—
1990–91	Buffalo Sabres	NHL	60	8	23	31	46	6	3	3	6	10
1991–92	Buffalo Sabres	NHL	50	5	16	21	45	—	—	—	—	—
1992–93	Rochester Americans	AHL	5	0	2	2	8	—	—	—	—	—
1992–93	Buffalo Sabres	NHL	50	2	14	16	45	8	0	0	0	8
1993–94	Dallas Stars	NHL	84	9	37	46	42	9	1	2	3	6
1994–95	Dallas Stars	NHL	38	5	13	18	20	3	0	0	0	2
1995–96	Dallas Stars	NHL	73	5	19	24	20	—	—	—	—	—
1996–97	Dallas Stars	NHL	67	1	15	16	61	7	0	2	2	0
1997–98	Vancouver Canucks	NHL	49	2	13	15	14	—	—	—	—	—
1997–98	Boston Bruins	NHL	22	2	7	9	6	6	0	0	0	2
1998–99	Boston Bruins	NHL	47	4	8	12	33	2	0	0	0	2
1999–2000	Ottawa Senators	NHL	40	2	4	6	8	6	0	0	0	16
2000–01	Tampa Bay Lightning	NHL	14	2	2	4	12	—	—	—	—	—
2000–01	Dallas Stars	NHL	8	0	1	1	4	9	0	1	1	4
2001–02	Tampa Bay Lightning	NHL	53	1	3	4	12	—	—	—	—	—
2002–03	Brantford Blast	OHA-Sr.	6	0	4	4	0	—	—	—	—	—
2003–04	Brantford Blast	OHA-Sr.	16	2	12	14	20	—	—	—	—	—
NHL totals			1,028	90	276	366	766	83	6	12	18	96

=== International ===
Year	Team	Event	GP	G	A	Pts	PIM
1985	Canada	WC	3	0	1	1	0
1986	Canada	WC	10	0	2	2	10
Senior totals			13	0	3	3	10

== Awards and achievements ==
- MJHL First Team All-Star (1982)
- MJHL Top Defenceman (1982)
- MJHL Most Valuable Player (1982)
- Turnbull Cup MJHL Championship (1982)
- 1983-84 CHL Championship (Adams Cup) as a member of the Tulsa Oilers team coached by Tom Webster
- Played in the World Championships for Team Canada (1985 and 1986)
- Inducted into the Manitoba Sports Hall of Fame and Museum in 2005
- "Honoured Member" of the Manitoba Hockey Hall of Fame

== See also ==
- List of NHL players with 1,000 games played
