= Billy Autrey =

American football player (1933–2020)

Profile
- Position: Center

Personal information
- Born: January 17, 1933; Ridge, Texas
- Died: September 12, 2020 (aged 87); Waco, Texas
- Listed height: 6 ft 3 in (1.91 m)
- Listed weight: 220 lb (100 kg)

Career information
- High school: Marquez (TX)
- College: Stephen F. Austin

Career history
- Chicago Bears (1953)
- Stats at Pro Football Reference

William Rex Autrey (January 17, 1933 – September 12, 2020) was an American football player who played for Chicago Bears of the National Football League (NFL). He played college football at Stephen F. Austin State University.

He died on September 12, 2020, in Waco, Texas at age 87.
