= Woodland Hills Academy (Pennsylvania) =

- Turtle Creek High School
- U.S. National Register of Historic Places
- Pittsburgh Landmark – PHLF
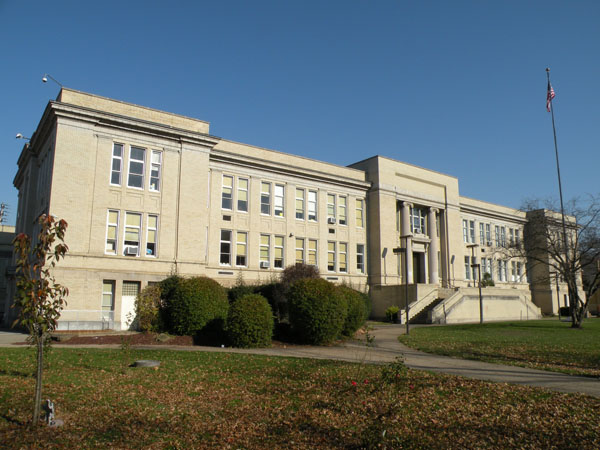

- Location within Pennsylvania Location within the United States
- Location: 126 Monroeville Avenue, Turtle Creek, Pennsylvania, USA
- Coordinates: 40°24′18″N 79°49′26″W
- Built: 1917
- Architect: George Henry Schwan
- Architectural style: Classical Revival
- NRHP reference No.: 07000880

Significant dates
- Added to NRHP: August 30, 2007
- Designated PHLF: 2009

The Woodland Hills Academy is an historic school in Turtle Creek, Pennsylvania, United States. Part of the Woodland Hills School District, this building was added to the National Register of Historic Places on August 30, 2007, and to the List of Pittsburgh History and Landmarks Foundation Historic Landmarks in 2009.

== History and notable features ==
Built in 1917 as the Turtle Creek High School, this historic school re-opened in 2009 as the Woodland Hills Academy. It currently serves students in kindergarten through grade eight.

The building was added to the National Register of Historic Places on August 30, 2007, and to the List of Pittsburgh History and Landmarks Foundation Historic Landmarks in 2009.

== Notable alumni ==
- Leon Hart, football player, Heisman Trophy winner and tight end for 1957 NFL champion Detroit Lions
- William McMillan, Olympic gold medalist.
- The Vogues
