= Dorne Dibble =

American football player (1929–2018)

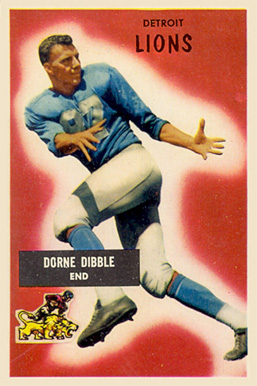
- Dibble on a 1955 Bowman football card

No. 84, 87
- Positions: End, defensive back

Personal information
- Born: April 16, 1929; Adrian, Michigan, U.S.
- Died: March 1, 2018 (aged 88); Northville, Michigan, U.S.
- Listed height: 6 ft 2 in (1.88 m)
- Listed weight: 195 lb (88 kg)

Career information
- High school: Adrian
- College: Michigan State
- NFL draft: 1951: 3rd round, 33rd overall pick

Career history
- Detroit Lions (1951, 1953–1957)

Awards and highlights
- 2× NFL champion (1953, 1957); First-team All-American (1950)

Career NFL statistics
- Receptions: 146
- Receiving yards: 2,552
- Receiving touchdowns: 19
- Stats at Pro Football Reference

Dorne Allen Dibble (April 16, 1929 – March 1, 2018) was an American professional football wide receiver for the Detroit Lions (1951, 1953–1957). He attended Michigan State.

Dibble was the Lions' third-round draft pick in 1951 after starring at Michigan State where he earned All-American honors as a defensive end his senior year. The Lions converted him to receiver and the switch paid instant dividends. Dibble tied Doak Walker's record for the most touchdown receptions by a rookie with six TD catches in 1951. Dibble also set the Lions' rookie record for yards per catch average that season at 20.4 – 30 catches for 613 yards.

Dibble served the 1952 season in the military, but came back to star for the Lions from 1953 to 1957 and helped the Detroit win the NFL Championships in 1953 and 1957. The Lions also went to the title game in 1954, the year Dibble led Detroit receivers and ranked fifth in the NFL with 46 receptions for 768 yards and six touchdowns.

In his career, Dibble had 146 receptions for 2,552 yards – a 17.5 yards-per-catch average – and 19 TDs.

Dibble died in Northville, Michigan, on March 1, 2018, of pneumonia at the age of 88.

== NFL career statistics ==
Legend
	Won the NFL championship
**Bold**	Career high

=== Regular season ===
Year	Team	Games		Receiving				
Year	Team	GP	GS	Rec	Yds	Avg	Lng	TD
1951	DET	12	11	30	613	**20.4**	47	**6**
1953	DET	12	1	16	274	17.1	47	3
1954	DET	12	12	**46**	**768**	16.7	45	**6**
1955	DET	8	6	14	179	12.8	44	2
1956	DET	12	12	32	597	18.7	**56**	2
1957	DET	12	3	8	121	15.1	23	0
		68	45	146	2,552	17.5	56	19

=== Playoffs ===
Year	Team	Games		Receiving				
Year	Team	GP	GS	Rec	Yds	Avg	Lng	TD
1953	DET	1	1	1	22	**22.0**	**22**	0
1954	DET	1	1	**4**	**63**	15.8	18	0
1957	DET	2	0	0	0	0.0	0	0
		4	2	5	85	17.0	22	0
