= Doug Hogland =

American football player (1931–2017)

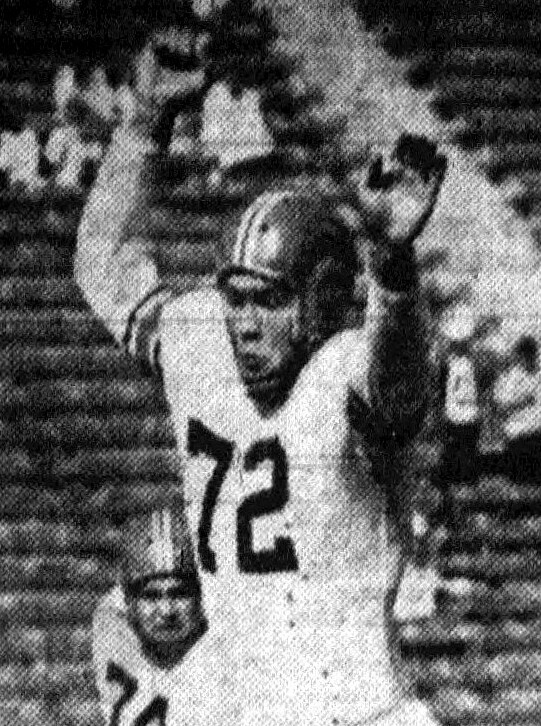
- Hogland during a game on October 13, 1951

No. 64
- Positions: Guard, tackle

Personal information
- Born: May 8, 1931; Farmington, New Mexico, U.S.
- Died: March 4, 2017 (aged 85); Tillamook, Oregon, U.S.
- Listed height: 6 ft 4 in (1.93 m)
- Listed weight: 245 lb (111 kg)

Career information
- High school: Bend (Bend, Oregon)
- College: Oregon State
- NFL draft: 1953: 8th round, 94th overall pick

Career history
- San Francisco 49ers (1953–1955); Chicago Cardinals (1956–1958); Detroit Lions (1958)

Career NFL statistics
- Games played: 72
- Games started: 58
- Fumble recoveries: 4
- Stats at Pro Football Reference

Matthew Douglas Hogland (May 8, 1931 – March 4, 2017) was an American professional football guard and tackle who played college football for Oregon State (1950–1952) and professional football in the National Football League (NFL) for the San Francisco 49ers (1953–1955), Chicago Cardinals (1956–1958), and Detroit Lions (1958). He appeared in a total of 72 NFL games, 58 of them as a starter.

== Early life ==
Hogland was born in 1931 in Farmington, New Mexico. He moved to Colorado as an infant and to Bend, Oregon, in 1942. He attended Bend High School, where he played both football and basketball and graduated in 1949. He then played college football at Oregon State from 1950 to 1952. He received the President's Trophy as Oregon State's best scholar/athlete.

== Professional career ==
He was selected by the San Francisco 49ers with the 94th overall pick in the 1953 NFL draft. He played for the Rams from 1953 to 1955, appearing in 36 games, including 33 as a starter.

In May 1956, Hogland was traded to the Chicago Cardinals in exchange for a 1957 draft choice. He played for the Cardinals from 1956 to 1958, appearing in 26 games, including 22 as a starter. He was traded to the Detroit Lions on October 11, 1958, and appeared in 10 games for the 1958 Lions, three as a starter.

== Personal life ==
After his playing career ended, Hogland worked as a teacher and coach at Tillamook High School. In 1971, he went to work for the Oregon Youth Authority.
