= Carl Karilivacz =

American football player (1930–1969)

No. 20, 21, 31
- Positions: Defensive back, halfback

Personal information
- Born: November 20, 1930; Glen Cove, New York, U.S.
- Died: August 30, 1969 (aged 38); Glen Cove, New York, U.S.
- Listed height: 6 ft 0 in (1.83 m)
- Listed weight: 188 lb (85 kg)

Career information
- High school: Glen Cove
- College: Syracuse
- NFL draft: 1953: 23rd round, 277th overall pick

Career history
- Detroit Lions (1953–1957); New York Giants (1958); Los Angeles Rams (1959–1960); Pittsburgh Steelers (1961)*
- * Offseason or practice squad member only

Awards and highlights
- 2× NFL champion (1953, 1957)

Career NFL statistics
- Interceptions: 13
- Fumble recoveries: 9
- Total touchdowns: 2
- Stats at Pro Football Reference

Carl Karilivacz (/kɛərɪˈlɛvɪtʃ/ kair-ih-LEV-itch; November 20, 1930 – August 30, 1969) was an American professional football player who was a defensive back for eight seasons in the National Football League (NFL) with the Detroit Lions, the New York Giants, and the Los Angeles Rams. He played college football at Syracuse.

== Professional career ==
=== Detroit Lions ===
Karilivacz was drafted in the 23rd round of the 1953 NFL draft by the Detroit Lions to play wide receiver. He was switched to defense during training camp.

Over five seasons with the Lions, he played in 58 games with 52 starts, including three championship games in 1953, 1954, and 1957. While the 1954 championship game ended in a loss, the other two resulted in the Lions, and Karilivacz, being crowned NFL champions.

=== New York Giants ===
Tom Landry, the player-coach of the New York Giants, had been looking for a player to play right cornerback and made a trade for Karilivacz on September 15, 1958, exchanging him for a 1959 fourth-round pick. The Lions later used this pick to select Bob Grottkau 46th overall.

Karilivacz played twelve games in his singular season with the Giants, scoring one touchdown on a 23-yard fumble return.

=== Los Angeles Rams ===
After the Giants acquired cornerback Dick Lynch, Karilivacz signed with the Los Angeles Rams. Over two seasons with the Rams, he played in 15 games with 7 starts.

=== Pittsburgh Steelers ===
Karilivacz spent a brief amount of time in the 1961 offseason with the Pittsburgh Steelers. He was released by the Steelers on September 12.

== Death ==
Karilivacz died at his home of a heart attack on August 30, 1969.
