= Tom Dublinski =

American gridiron football player (1930–2015)

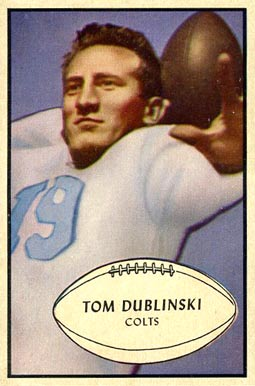
- Dublinski on a 1953 Bowman football card ("Colts" is an error)

No. 19, 91, 17, 9, 14
- Position: Quarterback

Personal information
- Born: August 8, 1930; Chicago, Illinois, U.S.
- Died: November 26, 2015 (aged 85); Salt Lake City, Utah, U.S.
- Listed height: 6 ft 2 in (1.88 m)
- Listed weight: 212 lb (96 kg)

Career information
- High school: Hinsdale Central (Hinsdale, Illinois)
- College: Utah
- NFL draft: 1952: 8th round, 93rd overall pick

Career history
- Detroit Lions (1952–1954); Toronto Argonauts (1955–1957); New York Giants (1958); Hamilton Tiger-Cats (1959); Denver Broncos (1960); Hamilton Tiger-Cats (1961); Toronto Argonauts (1962)

Awards and highlights
- 2× NFL champion (1952, 1953)

Career NFL statistics
- Passing attempts: 177
- Passing completions: 93
- Completion percentage: 52.5%
- TD–INT: 8–13
- Passing yards: 1,300
- Passer rating: 60.9
- Stats at Pro Football Reference

Thomas Eugene Dublinski (August 8, 1930 – November 26, 2015) was an American professional football player who was a quarterback for five seasons in the National Football League (NFL) from 1952 to 1960 for three different teams including the Detroit Lions. He also saw playing time in the Canadian Football League (CFL) with the Toronto Argonauts and Hamilton Tiger-Cats. He played college football for the Utah Utes. Dublinski died on November 26, 2015.
