= Tewe =

Tewe may refer to:

- Tewe is a dialect, see Manyika dialect
- Ralph Tewe, English MP in 1301 and 1302

== See also ==
- Tewes, surname page
