= John Huzvar =

American football player (1929–2007)

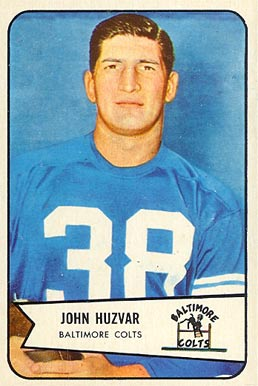
- Huzvar on a 1954 Bowman football card

No. 38
- Position: Fullback

Personal information
- Born: August 6, 1929; Carlisle, Pennsylvania, U.S.
- Died: March 9, 2007 (aged 77); Homestead, Florida, U.S.
- Listed height: 6 ft 4 in (1.93 m)
- Listed weight: 247 lb (112 kg)

Career information
- High school: Hershey (Hershey, Pennsylvania)
- College: North Carolina State

Career history
- Philadelphia Eagles (1952); Baltimore Colts (1953–1954)
- Stats at Pro Football Reference

John Francis Huzvar II (August 6, 1929 – March 9, 2007) was an American professional football player who played three seasons in the National Football League (NFL) with the Philadelphia Eagles and Baltimore Colts. He first enrolled at the University of Pittsburgh before transferring to North Carolina State University.

== Early life ==
Huzvar played high school football at Hershey High School in Hershey, Pennsylvania, receiving multiple varsity letters. He graduated in 1947.

== College career ==
Huzvar first played college football for the Pittsburgh Panthers and later transferred to play for the NC State Wolfpack.

== Professional career ==
Huzvar played in twelve games for the Philadelphia Eagles during the 1952 season. He then played in twenty games for the Baltimore Colts from 1953 to 1954. His career was cut short after he suffered a serious head injury while with the Colts.

== Personal life ==
Huzvar served in the United States Marine Corps. He was later an NFL scout for free agents. He was also inducted into the Central Pennsylvania Sports Hall of Fame.
