= 1953 Los Angeles Rams season =

NFL team season

- Head coach: Hamp Pool
- Home stadium: Los Angeles Memorial Coliseum

Results
- Record: 8–3–1
- Division place: 3rd NFL Western
- Playoffs: Did not qualify

Uniform
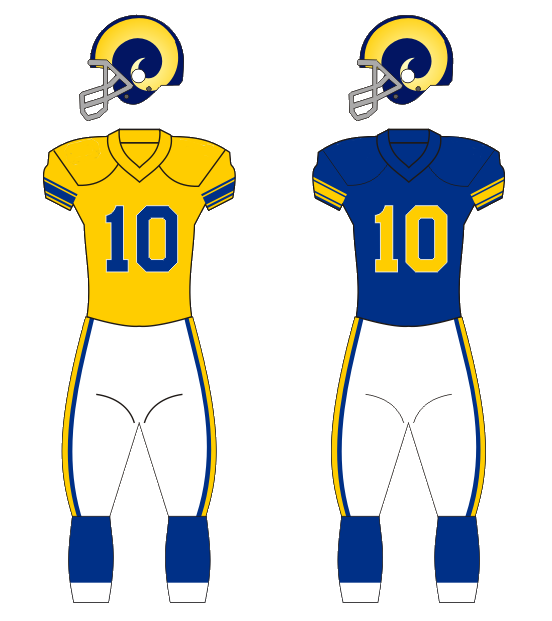

Coaching staff of the Rams in 1953.

The 1953 Los Angeles Rams season was the team's 16th year with the National Football League and the eighth season in Los Angeles.

== Schedule ==
Week	Date	Opponent	Result	Record	Venue	Attendance
1	September 27	New York Giants	**W** 21–7	1–0	Los Angeles Memorial Coliseum	49,579
2	October 4	at **San Francisco 49ers**	**L** 30–31	1–1	Kezar Stadium	43,922
3	October 11	at Green Bay Packers	**W** 38–20	2–1	Milwaukee County Stadium	23,353
4	October 18	at **Detroit Lions**	**W** 31–19	3–1	Briggs Stadium	55,772
5	October 25	**Chicago Bears**	**W** 38–24	4–1	Los Angeles Memorial Coliseum	49,546
6	November 1	**Detroit Lions**	**W** 37–24	5–1	Los Angeles Memorial Coliseum	93,751
7	November 8	**San Francisco 49ers**	**L** 27–31	5–2	Los Angeles Memorial Coliseum	85,865
8	November 15	at Chicago Cardinals	**T** 24–24	5–2–1	Comiskey Park	26,674
9	November 22	at **Baltimore Colts**	**W** 21–13	6–2–1	Memorial Stadium	27,268
10	November 29	at **Chicago Bears**	**L** 21–24	6–3–1	Wrigley Field	31,626
11	December 5	**Baltimore Colts**	**W** 45–2	7–3–1	Los Angeles Memorial Coliseum	26,656
12	December 12	**Green Bay Packers**	**W** 33–17	8–3–1	Los Angeles Memorial Coliseum	23,069
Note: Intra-conference opponents are in **bold** text.

=== Standings ===
NFL Western Conference
	W	L	T	PCT	CONF	PF	PA	STK
Detroit Lions	10	2	0	.833	8–2	271	205	W6
San Francisco 49ers	9	3	0	.750	8–2	372	237	W4
Los Angeles Rams	8	3	1	.727	7–3	366	236	W2
Chicago Bears	3	8	1	.273	2–7–1	218	262	L2
Baltimore Colts	3	9	0	.250	2–8	182	350	L7
Green Bay Packers	2	9	1	.182	2–7–1	200	338	L5

Note: Tie games were not officially counted in the standings until 1972.

== Final roster ==
1953 Los Angeles Rams roster
Quarterbacks (QB): 10 Rudy Bukich; 11 Norm Van Brocklin P; Running backs (RB): 23 Tom McCormick; 27 Brad Myers; 21 Skeet Quinlan; 47 Vitamin Smith; 32 Dan Towler; 35 Tank Younger LB; Wide receivers (WR): 82 Bob Boyd CB; 80 Tom Fears K; 40 Elroy Hirsch; Tight ends (TE)	Offensive linemen (OL): 71 Tom Dahms T; 67 Dick Daugherty G; 72 Bob Fry T; 63 John Hock G; 62 Bud McFadin G/MG; 50 Leon McLaughlin C; 61 Duane Putnam G; Defensive linemen (DL): 83 Larry Brink DE; 85 Gene Lipscomb DE; 84 Andy Robustelli DE; 74 Len Teeuws DT/T; 70 Charlie Toogood DT; 64 Stan West MG	Linebackers (LB): 58 Bob Griffin; 57 Don Paul; 65 Harland Svare; Defensive backs (DB): 29 Jack Dwyer CB; 88 Norb Hecker S/WR; 81 Night Train Lane CB; 20 Woodley Lewis S/CB/RB; 42 Herb Rich S; Special teams (ST)	Reserve: -- Bob Carey WR (Military); 79 Frank Fuller DT (Military); -- Les Richter LB (Military); 66 Harry Thompson G/DE (IR); Rookies in italics
