= Dick Flowers =

American football player (1927–2010)

No. 18
- Position: Quarterback

Personal information
- Born: August 13, 1927; South Bend, Indiana, U.S.
- Died: May 7, 2010 (aged 82); Mishawaka, Indiana, U.S.
- Listed height: 6 ft 0 in (1.83 m)
- Listed weight: 190 lb (86 kg)

Career information
- High school: South Bend Central (IN)
- College: Northwestern

Career history
- Green Bay Packers (1953)*; Baltimore Colts (1953)
- * Offseason or practice squad member only

Awards and highlights
- Second-team All-Big Ten (1950)

Career statistics
- Games played: 1
- Passing yards: 18
- Passer rating: 62.5
- Stats at Pro Football Reference

Richard R. Flowers (August 13, 1927 – May 7, 2010) was an American football quarterback who played for one season in the National Football League (NFL). He played for the Baltimore Colts in 1953. He played college football at Northwestern.

== College career ==
Flowers played college football at Northwestern University where was the backup quarterback in the 1949 Rose Bowl. In 1950, Flowers became the second quarterback in school history to pass for over 1,000 yards in a season.

== Military career ==
Following graduation, Flowers joined the United States Marine Corps and served in the Korean War.

== Professional career ==
Flowers signed with the Green Bay Packers after serving with the Marines in 1953. He was traded to the Baltimore Colts on August 27, 1953, in exchange for an undisclosed draft pick in 1954. He played in one game for the Colts, going 2–for–4 for 18 yards.
