= John Martinkovic =

American football player (1927–2018)

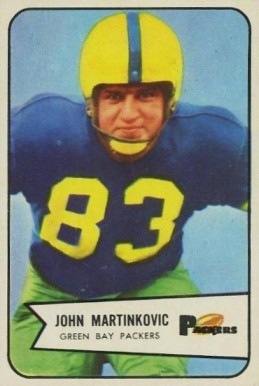
- Martinkovic on a 1954 Bowman football card

No. 39, 47, 83
- Positions: Defensive end, defensive tackle

Personal information
- Born: February 4, 1927; Hamilton, Ohio, U.S.
- Died: February 8, 2018 (aged 91); Allouez, Wisconsin, U.S.
- Listed height: 6 ft 3 in (1.91 m)
- Listed weight: 241 lb (109 kg)

Career information
- High school: Hamilton Catholic
- College: Xavier (OH) (1947–1950)
- NFL draft: 1951: 6th round, 65th overall pick

Career history
- Green Bay Packers (1951–1956); New York Giants (1957)

Awards and highlights
- 2× Second-team All-Pro (1954, 1956); 2× Pro Bowl (1953, 1955); Green Bay Packers Hall of Fame

Career NFL statistics
- Fumble recoveries: 11
- Total touchdowns: 2
- Stats at Pro Football Reference

John George Martinkovic (February 4, 1927 – February 8, 2018) was an American professional football player who was a defensive lineman in the National Football League for the Green Bay Packers and the New York Giants. He played college football and basketball for the Xavier Musketeers and was selected in the sixth round of the 1951 NFL draft by the Washington Redskins. He was inducted into the Green Bay Packers Hall of Fame in 1974. Martinkovic died on February 8, 2018, at the age of 91.
