= Len Teeuws =

American football player (1927–2006)

No. 74
- Positions: Defensive tackle, offensive tackle

Personal information
- Born: April 19, 1927; Oak Park, Illinois, U.S.
- Died: July 14, 2006 (aged 79); Indianapolis, Indiana, U.S.
- Listed height: 6 ft 5 in (1.96 m)
- Listed weight: 242 lb (110 kg)

Career information
- High school: Oak Park and River Forest
- College: Tulane (1950–1951)
- NFL draft: 1952: 25th round, 301st overall pick

Career history
- Los Angeles Rams (1952–1953); Chicago Cardinals (1954–1957); Indianapolis Warriors (1961)

Career NFL statistics
- Games played: 72
- Games started: 51
- Fumble recoveries: 6
- Stats at Pro Football Reference

Leonard Teeuws (April 19, 1927 – July 14, 2006) was an American professional football offensive tackle/defensive tackle in the National Football League. He played two seasons for the Los Angeles Rams (1952–1953) and four seasons for the Chicago Cardinals (1954–1957). Teeuws attended Tulane University.
