= Tewes =

Tewes is a surname and may refer to:

- Donald Edgar Tewes (1916–2012), American politician from Wisconsin
- Jan-Peter Tewes (born 1968), German field hockey player
- Lauren Tewes (born 1953), American actress
- Paul Tewes (contemporary), American political strategist
- Stefan Tewes (born 1967), German field hockey player

== See also ==
- Tewe (disambiguation)
