= 1953 NFL Championship Game =

Coordinates: 42.332°N 83.069°W

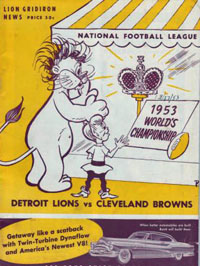
Cleveland Browns (Eastern) (11–1)	Detroit Lions (Western) (10–2)
16	17
Head coach: Paul Brown	Head coach: Buddy Parker
	1	2	3	4	Total
CLE	0	3	7	6	16
DET	7	3	0	7	17
- Date: December 27, 1953
- Stadium: Briggs Stadium; Detroit, Michigan
- Attendance: 54,577

TV in the United States
- Network: DuMont
- Announcers: Harry Wismer and Red Grange

Radio in the United States
- Network: Mutual
- Announcers: Earl Gillespie, Chris Schenkel

Location in the United States

The 1953 NFL Championship Game was the 21st annual championship game, held on December 27 at Briggs Stadium in Detroit.

The defending NFL champion Detroit Lions (10–2) of the Western Conference were led by quarterback Bobby Layne and running back Doak Walker, and the Cleveland Browns (11–1) of the Eastern Conference were led by head coach Paul Brown and quarterback Otto Graham. The game was a rematch of the previous year, which was won by the Lions, 17–7. This was the Browns' fourth consecutive NFL championship game appearance since joining the league in 1950, and they were favored by three points.

The Lions were attempting to become the third team in the championship game era (since 1933) to repeat as champions, following the Chicago Bears (1940, 1941) and Philadelphia Eagles (1948, 1949), and the fourth franchise in NFL history to repeat as champions.

The home underdog Lions rallied in the fourth quarter with a late touchdown and conversion to win by a single point, 17–16, to repeat as league champions. The two teams met the following year for a third consecutive title match-up, which was won by the Browns.

Ticket prices ranged from three to seven dollars.

== Game summary ==
The game proved to be a tight affair, as both teams turned the ball over four times each.

The Lions struck first with a Doak Walker touchdown, and both scored field goals in the second quarter and the Lions led at halftime, 10–3. The Browns took the lead on a Chick Jagade run in the third quarter while Lou Groza kicked two field goals as Cleveland took the lead on 13 straight points in the second half.

Trailing 16–10 with four minutes and 10 seconds of play remaining, the Lions started from their own 20-yard line and fought their way 80 yards in eight plays, the touchdown coming on a 33-yard pass from Bobby Layne to Jim Doran in the end zone, and Walker's extra point gave the Lions the lead.

Trailing 17–16, the Browns had one last chance; Ken Carpenter started the drive with a run to his own 28, but an Otto Graham pass intended for Pete Brewster was deflected by rookie defensive halfback Carl Karilivacz, who intercepted the throw, clinching the Lions their third title. Graham had a miserable game, finishing with a 0.0 passer rating on 2-of-15 passing while Detroit's Bobby Layne went 12-of-25 for 179 yards. The leading rusher of the game was Chick Jagade, who ran for 102 yards on 15 carries for Cleveland.

=== Scoring summary ===
Detroit Lions 17, Cleveland Browns 16

Quarter	1	2	3	4	Total
Browns	0	3	7	6	16
Lions	7	3	0	7	17

at Briggs Stadium, Detroit, Michigan

- Date: December 27, 1953
- Game time: 1:00 p.m. EST
- Pro-Football-Reference

Game information
- First quarter
  - DET – Doak Walker 1-yard run (Walker kick). Lions 7–0
- Second quarter
  - CLE – Lou Groza 13-yard field goal. Lions 7–3
  - DET – Doak Walker 23-yard field goal. Lions 10–3
- Third quarter
  - CLE – Chick Jagade 9-yard run (Groza kick). Tied 10–10
- Fourth quarter
  - CLE – Lou Groza 15-yard goal. Browns 13–10
  - CLE – Lou Groza 43-yard goal. Browns 16–10
  - DET – Jim Doran 33-yard pass from Bobby Layne (Walker kick) Lions 17–16

== Officials ==
- Referee: Ron Gibbs
- Umpire: Sam Wilson
- Head linesman: Dan Tehan
- Back judge: James Hamer
- Field judge: Carl Rebele
- Alternate: John Glascott
- Alternate: Yans Wallace

The NFL added the fifth official, the back judge, in 1947; the line judge arrived in 1965, and the side judge in 1978.

== Players' shares ==
The gross receipts for the game, including radio and television rights, were just under $359,000. Each player on the winning Lions team received $2,424, while Browns players made $1,654 each, the highest to date.

== Video ==
- "World's Championship Football Game: Cleveland Browns at Detroit Lions, 1953." Detroit Historical Society via YouTube.com (Color highlight film with audio.)
- 1953 NFL Championship Game – game footage (No audio.)
