= 1953 NFL season =

American football season

Regular season
- Duration: September 27 – December 13, 1953
- East Champions: Cleveland Browns
- West Champions: Detroit Lions

Championship Game
- Champions: Detroit Lions

NFL teams: West, East

The 1953 NFL season was the 34th regular season of the National Football League. The names of the American and National divisions were changed back to the Eastern and Western divisions.

The season ended on December 27 with the NFL Championship Game in which the Detroit Lions defeated the Cleveland Browns for the second year in a row.

== Draft ==
The 1953 NFL draft was held on January 22, 1953, at The Bellevue-Stratford Hotel in Philadelphia. With the first pick, the San Francisco 49ers selected defensive end Harry Babcock from Georgia.

== Major rule changes ==
The definition of illegal motion was clarified so that a player moving directly forward at the snap was to be considered illegally in motion.

== Enfranchisement of the new Baltimore Colts ==
A Baltimore, Maryland, group headed by Carroll Rosenbloom was granted an NFL expansion team and was given the roster & assets of the defunct Dallas Texans organization. The new expansion team was named the Baltimore Colts, after the unrelated original Baltimore Colts team that folded after the 1950 season. While the original Colts franchise used a green and silver color scheme, the new Colts franchise chose the blue and white color scheme used by the Texans.

The 12 teams of this NFL season continued for the rest of the decade of the 1950s. These would become known as "old-line" teams as they predated the 1960 launch of the American Football League (AFL).

== Division races ==
For 1953, the former American and National Divisions of the previous three seasons were renamed back to the Eastern and Western Divisions, respectively. The Western race saw the Rams beat the Lions twice, in Detroit (October 18) and in L.A. (November 1), and at the midway point in Week Six, the Rams were a full game ahead in the race. In Week Seven (November 8), the 49ers beat the Rams 31–27, and the Lions won their game, to put all three teams at 5–2–0. In Week Eight, the Lions beat Green Bay 14–7, while the Rams were tied 24–24 by the Cards, and the 49ers lost 23–21 to the Browns. As both teams won their remaining games, San Francisco was always a game behind Detroit.

In the Eastern, the Cleveland Browns won their first eleven games and led wire-to-wire, clinching a playoff spot by week 10. Their shot at a 12–0–0 regular season was spoiled by a 42–27 loss in the finale on December 13, and tarnished further by the championship game loss to the Lions two weeks later.

Week	Western	Record	Eastern	Record
1	4 teams	1–0–0	Tie (Cle, Was)	1–0–0
2	Tie (Det, SF)	2–0–0	Cleveland Browns	2–0–0
3	Detroit Lions	3–0–0	Cleveland Browns	3–0–0
4	3 teams	3–1–0	Cleveland Browns	4–0–0
5	Tie (Det, LA)	4–1–0	Cleveland Browns	5–0–0
6	Los Angeles Rams	5–1–0	Cleveland Browns	6–0–0
7	3 teams	5–2–0	Cleveland Browns	7–0–0
8	Detroit Lions	6–2–0	Cleveland Browns	8–0–0
9	Detroit Lions	7–2–0	Cleveland Browns	9–0–0
10	Detroit Lions	8–2–0	Cleveland Browns	10–0–0
11	Detroit Lions	9–2–0	Cleveland Browns	11–0–0
12	Detroit Lions	10–2–0	Cleveland Browns	11–1–0

== Final standings ==
NFL Eastern Conference
	W	L	T	PCT	CONF	PF	PA	STK
Cleveland Browns	11	1	0	.917	9–1	348	162	L1
Philadelphia Eagles	7	4	1	.636	6–3–1	352	215	W1
Washington Redskins	6	5	1	.545	6–3–1	208	215	L1
Pittsburgh Steelers	6	6	0	.500	5–5	211	263	W2
New York Giants	3	9	0	.250	3–7	179	277	L2
Chicago Cardinals	1	10	1	.091	0–10	190	337	W1

Note: Tie games were not officially counted in the standings until 1972.

NFL Western Conference
	W	L	T	PCT	CONF	PF	PA	STK
Detroit Lions	10	2	0	.833	8–2	271	205	W6
San Francisco 49ers	9	3	0	.750	8–2	372	237	W4
Los Angeles Rams	8	3	1	.727	7–3	366	236	W2
Chicago Bears	3	8	1	.273	2–7–1	218	262	L2
Baltimore Colts	3	9	0	.250	2–8	182	350	L7
Green Bay Packers	2	9	1	.182	2–7–1	200	338	L5

== NFL Championship Game ==
Detroit 17, Cleveland 16 at Briggs Stadium in Detroit, on December 27, 1953

== Attendance ==
A total of 2,164,585 fans attended the 72 regular season league games held in the 1953 season. Another 54,577 attended the league championship game, for a total attendance of 2,219,162, or 30,399 per game.

Eleven of the 12 teams in the league reported profitable financial operations, with only the Chicago Cardinals losing money — with this franchise said to have reduced its red ink "drastically" from its 1952 operations.

== League leaders ==
Statistic	Name	Team	Yards
Passing	Otto Graham	Cleveland	2,722
Rushing	Joe Perry	San Francisco	1,018
Receiving	Pete Pihos	Philadelphia	1,049

== Awards ==
- UPI NFL Most Valuable Player – Otto Graham, Cleveland Browns

== Coaching changes ==
=== Offseason ===
- Baltimore Colts: The expansion Colts team hired Keith Molesworth as their first head coach.
- Chicago Cardinals: Joe Kuharich was replaced by Joe Stydahar.

=== In-season ===
- Green Bay Packers: Gene Ronzani resigned after 10 games. Hugh Devore and Ray McLean served as co-head coaches for the rest of the season.

== Stadium changes ==
- The expansion Baltimore Colts move into Memorial Stadium, the lone Baltimore home of the original AAFC Colts team.
- The Green Bay Packers home games in Milwaukee moved from Marquette Stadium to Milwaukee County Stadium.
- Shibe Park, the home of the Philadelphia Eagles, was renamed Connie Mack Stadium.

== Additional sources ==
- NFL Record and Fact Book (ISBN 1-932994-36-X)
- NFL History 1951–1960 (Last accessed December 4, 2005)
- Total Football: The Official Encyclopedia of the National Football League (ISBN 0-06-270174-6)
