= 1952 Detroit Lions season =

NFL team season (won NFL Championship)

- Head coach: Buddy Parker
- Home stadium: Briggs Stadium

Results
- Record: 9–3
- Division place: 1st NFL National
- Playoffs: Won Conference Playoff (vs. Rams) 31–21; Won NFL Championship (at Browns) 17–7
- All-Pros: 3: E Cloyce Box; OG Lou Creekmur; QB Bobby Layne
- Pro Bowlers: 7: Cloyce Box, DE Lou Creekmur, OG Don Doll, S Pat Harder, FB Bob Hoernschemeyer, RB Bobby Layne, QB Bob Smith, DB

The 1952 Detroit Lions season was the franchise's 23rd season in the National Football League. The Lions won their second National Football League (NFL) championship, having won their first championship 17 years earlier in 1935. The team's co-captains were halfback Robert Hoernschemeyer and defensive tackle John Prchlik, and defensive end Jim Doran was selected as the team's most valuable player. In their third year under head coach Buddy Parker, the 1952 Lions compiled a 9–3 record during the regular season, finished in a tie with the Los Angeles Rams for first place in the NFL's National Conference, defeated the Rams in a tiebreaker game, and defeated the Cleveland Browns, 17–7, in the 1952 NFL Championship Game at Municipal Stadium in Cleveland.

The 1952 Lions outscored opponents 354 to 192 in 12 regular season games and ranked first in the NFL with an average of 29.5 points scored per game. The offense was led by quarterback Bobby Layne who ranked second in the NFL with 2,410 yards of total offense – 1,999 passing and 411 rushing. End Cloyce Box led the NFL with 15 touchdowns, including nine touchdown catches in the final three games of the regular season. For the third consecutive year, Bob Hoernschemeyer was the team's leading rusher with 457 yards and an average of 4.3 yards per carry. Jack Christiansen led the NFL with an average of 21.5 yards per punt return, returned two punts for touchdowns, and ranked fourth in the NFL with 731 punt and kick return yards.

The Lions' defense ranked first in the NFL in points allowed, allowing 16 points per game during the regular season. Defensive back Bob Smith ranked among the NFL leaders with a 90-yard interception return (2nd), nine interceptions (3rd), and 184 interception return yards (3rd). Smith was also the team's punter and ranked second in the NFL with an average of 44.7 yards per punt. Six players from the 1952 Lions team, Layne, Christiansen, halfback Doak Walker, defensive back Yale Lary, and offensive linemen Lou Creekmur and Dick Stanfel, were later inducted into the Pro Football Hall of Fame.

== Preseason ==
=== Summary ===
The 1951 Lions had compiled a 7–4–1 record and finished in a tie for second place in the NFL National Conference. The 1952 team was a veteran group, including quarterback Bobby Layne (fifth year in NFL, third in Detroit), fullback Pat Harder (seventh year in NFL, second in Detroit), halfbacks Doak Walker (third year in NFL, all in Detroit) and Bob Hoernschemeyer (seventh year in NFL, third in Detroit), ends Cloyce Box (third year in NFL, all in Detroit) and Leon Hart (third year in NFL, all in Detroit), defensive linemen Les Bingaman (fifth year in NFL, all in Detroit), John Prchlik (fourth year in NFL, all in Detroit), Thurman "Fum" McGraw (third year in NFL, all in Detroit), and defensive backs Don Doll (fourth year in NFL, all in Detroit), Jack Christiansen (second year in NFL, both in Detroit), and Bob Smith (fifth year in pro ball, fourth in Detroit).

The Lions won all six pre-season exhibition games as follows: (1) 28–13 over the Chicago Cardinals on August 18 at Amarillo, Texas; (2) 7–3 over Philadelphia Eagles at Little Rock, Arkansas; (3) 33–13 over the New York Giants on September 2; (4) 28–21 over the Cleveland Browns on September 6; (5) 21–14 over the Dallas Texans on September 12 at Dallas; and (6) 45–7 over the Washington Redskins on September 20. The Lions were considered a favorite for the NFL championship.

Week	Date	Opponent	Result	Record	Venue	Attendance	Sources
1	August 18	vs. Chicago Cardinals	W 28–13	1–0	Sandstrom Stadium	10,500	
2	August 23	vs. Philadelphia Eagles	W 7–3	2–0	War Memorial Stadium	24,000	
3	September 2	New York Giants	W 33–17	3–0	Briggs Stadium	36,853	
4	September 6	vs. Cleveland Browns	W 28–21	4–0	Archbold Stadium	26,000	
5	September 12	at Dallas Texans	W 21–14	5–0	Cotton Bowl	32,000	
6	September 20	vs. Washington Redskins	W 45–7	6–0	Oklahoma Memorial Stadium	40,000	
General source:

== Regular season ==
According to the team, a total of 17,554 season tickets were sold by the Lions for the 1952 campaign. The Lions played their home games in Briggs Stadium (Tiger Stadium), which had a regular listed seating capacity of 46,194, with an additional 7,000 bleacher seats for football to bring total capacity to 53,194.

Game	Date	Opponent	Result	Record	Venue	Attendance	Recap	Sources
1	September 28	at **San Francisco 49ers**	**L** 3–17	0–1	Kezar Stadium	54,761	Recap	
2	October 3	at **Los Angeles Rams**	**W** 17–14	1–1	L.A. Memorial Coliseum	42,743	Recap	
3	October 12	**San Francisco 49ers**	**L** 0–28	1–2	Briggs Stadium	56,822	Recap	
4	October 19	**Los Angeles Rams**	**W** 24–16	2–2	Briggs Stadium	40,152	Recap	
5	October 26	at **Green Bay Packers**	**W** 52–17	3–2	City Stadium	24,656	Recap	
6	November 2	Cleveland Browns	**W** 17–6	4–2	Briggs Stadium	56,029	Recap	
7	November 9	at Pittsburgh Steelers	**W** 31–6	5–2	Forbes Field	26,170	Recap	
8	November 16	**Dallas Texans**	**W** 43–13	6–2	Briggs Stadium	33,304	Recap	
9	November 23	at **Chicago Bears**	**L** 23–24	6–3	Wrigley Field	37,508	Recap	
10	November 27	**Green Bay Packers**	**W** 48–24	7–3	Briggs Stadium	39,101	Recap	
11	December 7	**Chicago Bears**	**W** 45–21	8–3	Briggs Stadium	50,410	Recap	
12	December 13	**Dallas Texans**	**W** 41–6	9–3	Briggs Stadium	12,252	Recap	
Notes: Intra-conference opponents are in **bold** text. November 27: Thanksgiving.

== Game summaries ==
=== Week 1: at San Francisco ===
Team	1	2	3	4	Total
Detroit	0	3	0	0	3
• San Francisco	7	0	7	3	17

- Date: September 28
- Location: Kezar Stadium, San Francisco
- Game attendance: 52,750

On September 28, 1952, the Lions lost the first game of the regular season to the San Francisco 49ers by a 17–3 score in heavy fog at Kezar Stadium in San Francisco. The loss was the fourth in a row for the Lions against the 49ers, dating back to the 1950 season. The Lions' offense was limited to a 21-yard field goal by Doak Walker in the second quarter. Detroit turned the ball over five times on three interceptions and two fumbles. Joe Perry rushed 19 times for 80 yards and scored the 49ers first touchdown.

=== Week 2: at Los Angeles ===
Team	1	2	3	4	Total
• Detroit	0	14	3	0	17
Los Angeles	0	7	7	0	14

- Date: October 3
- Location: Los Angeles Memorial Coliseum
- Game attendance: 42,743

On Friday, October 3, 1952, the Lions defeated the defending NFL champion Los Angeles Rams, 17–14, at the Los Angeles Memorial Coliseum. Bobby Layne threw two touchdown passes to Cloyce Box, the first set up by a Les Bingaman interception. The Lions led, 14–0, but the Rams scored later in the second quarter on a 20-yard run. Doak Walker kicked a 13-yard field goal in the third quarter that ended up providing the deciding margin.

=== Week 3: San Francisco ===
Team	1	2	3	4	Total
• San Francisco	0	14	7	7	28
Detroit	0	0	0	0	0

- Date: October 12
- Location: Briggs Stadium, Detroit
- Game attendance: 56,822

On October 12, 1952, the Lions lost, 28-0 for the fifth consecutive time to the San Francisco 49ers. The Lions did not convert a first down in the first half, totaled only 114 yards of offense in the game, and were shut out for the first time since October 1948. The game was played at Briggs Stadium in front of the largest home crowd (56,822) in Lions history to that point. Bob Latshaw in the Detroit Free Press called it "as inept an exhibition as has ever been seen in Briggs Stadium", as the 49ers "smother[ed] any semblance of a Detroit offense." Having been billed as a championship contender in the preseason, the Lions had a 1-2 record after three regular season games.

=== Week 4: Los Angeles ===
Team	1	2	3	4	Total
Los Angeles	6	7	3	0	16
• Detroit	0	7	14	3	24

- Date: October 19
- Location: Briggs Stadium, Detroit
- Game attendance: 40,152

On October 19, 1952, the Lions defeated the Los Angeles Rams, 24-16, in front of a crowd of 40,152 at Briggs Stadium. After the Lions' poor performance the prior week against the 49ers, the Detroit crowd booed the Lions as they came onto the field. The boos continued as the Rams took a 13-0 lead in the second quarter. From that point forward, the Lions outscored the Rams, 24 to 3. The comeback began with a 64-yard touchdown pass from Bobby Layne to Cloyce Box. The Lions scored two more touchdowns in the third quarter on a 29-yard interception return by LaVern Torgeson and a 10-yard touchdown pass from Bob Hoernschemeyer to Cloyce Box. Pat Harder added a field goal in the fourth quarter.

=== Week 5: at Green Bay ===
Team	1	2	3	4	Total
• Detroit	14	14	14	10	52
Green Bay	7	3	7	0	17

- Date: October 26
- Location: City Stadium, Green Bay
- Game attendance: 24,656

On October 26, 1952, the Lions defeated the Green Bay Packers, 52–17, before a crowd of 24,656 at City Stadium in Green Bay. The 52 points scored by the Lions tied the franchise's all-time, single-game scoring record. Bobby Layne threw three touchdown passes, and Bob Hoernschemeyer rushed for two touchdowns. Jug Girard caught two touchdown passes and gained 130 yards, 69 receiving and 61 rushing. The Lions also scored on a 46-yard interception return by Bob Smith and a 65-yard punt return by Jack Christiansen. The defense held the Packers to 53 rushing yards, recovered four fumbles, and intercepted five passes. Pat Harder scored nine points on a 16-yard field goal and six extra points.

=== Week 6: Cleveland ===
Team	1	2	3	4	Total
Cleveland	3	0	3	0	6
• Detroit	0	10	0	7	17

- Date: November 2
- Location: Briggs Stadium, Detroit
- Game attendance: 56,029

On November 2, 1952, the Lions defeated the Cleveland Browns, 17-6, in front of a crowd of 56,029 at Briggs Stadium. The game was the first meeting between the Lions and the Browns, the latter having joined the NFL in 1950. On defense, the Lions forced four turnovers, including three interceptions, and held the Browns to two Lou Groza field goals. On offense, Bobby Layne threw two touchdown passes to Leon Hart. Hart, playing on his 24th birthday, caught eight passes for 109 yards. Pat Harder also kicked a 43-yard field goal. Defensive end Jim Doran at one point sacked Cleveland quarterback Otto Graham on consecutive plays for losses totaling 36 yards. The Lions intercepted three passes and held the Browns to 12 rushing yards in the second half.

=== Week 7: at Pittsburgh ===
Team	1	2	3	4	Total
• Detroit	3	7	7	14	31
Pittsburgh	0	0	6	0	6

- Date: November 9
- Location: Forbes Field, Pittsburgh
- Game attendance: 26,170

On November 9, 1952, the Lions defeated the Pittsburgh Steelers, 31–6, before a crowd of 26,170 at Forbes Field in Pittsburgh. Usually a pass-oriented offense, the Lions adopted a different approach against the Steelers, rushing for a season-high 321 yards. Bob Hoernschemeyer rushed for 107 yards on 20 carries, and Jug Girard contributed 71 yards and two touchdowns on six carries. Bobby Layne completed only four of 17 passes for 70 yards, 46 of which came on a touchdown pass to Cloyce Box in the third quarter. On defense, the Lions held the Steelers to minus three yards rushing and intercepted two passes. Defensive halfback Bob Smith recovered a fumbled lateral that set up a field goal in the first quarter and returned an interception 90 yards late in the game.

=== Week 8: Dallas ===
Team	1	2	3	4	Total
Dallas	0	0	13	0	13
• Detroit	10	19	0	14	43

- Date: November 16
- Location: Briggs Stadium, Detroit
- Game attendance: 33,304

On November 16, 1952, the Lions defeated the Dallas Texans, 43–13, before a crowd of 33,304 at Briggs Stadium. The loss was the eighth straight for the Texans. In the first half, the Lions took a 29-0 lead on two Pat Harder field goals, a 58-yard punt return by Yale Lary, an eight-yard run by Bobby Layne, a 55-yard touchdown pass from Layne to Cloyce Box, and a safety when defensive end Sonny Gandee tackled Pittsburgh quarterback Frank Tripucka in the end zone. In the fourth quarter, Harder kicked his third field goal, and fullback Ollie Cline scored on a two-yard run.

=== Week 9: at Chicago ===
Team	1	2	3	4	Total
Detroit	3	13	0	7	23
• Chicago	10	0	7	7	24

- Date: November 23
- Location: Wrigley Field, Chicago
- Game attendance: 37,508

On November 23, 1952, the Lions lost to the Chicago Bears, 24–23, before a crowd of 37,508 at Wrigley Field in Chicago. Bob Hoernschemeyer scored two rushing touchdowns, and Pat Harder also kicked a 31-yard field goal for the Lions. The Lions led, 16–10, at halftime, but the Bears took the lead in the third quarter on a 59-yard touchdown pass from George Blanda to Billy Stone. The Lions retook the lead, 23–17, when Jack Christiansen returned a punt 79 yards for a touchdown in the fourth quarter. With nine seconds left in the game, Blanda threw a two-yard touchdown pass to Ed Sprinkle for the winning score.

=== Week 10: Green Bay ===
Team	1	2	3	4	Total
Green Bay	3	14	7	0	24
• Detroit	3	21	7	17	48

- Date: November 27
- Location: Briggs Stadium, Detroit
- Game attendance: 39,101

On Thanksgiving Day, November 27, 1952, the Lions defeated the Green Bay Packers, 48–24, before a crowd of 39,101 at Briggs Stadium. The Lions scored 100 points in two games against the Packers during the 1952 season. In the Thanksgiving game, the Lions scored on five touchdown passes – three thrown by Bobby Layne and three caught by Cloyce Box. Layne accounted for over 300 yards of total offense – 63 yards on 13 rushing carries and 249 yards on 16 of 30 passing. Box caught a total of nine passes for 155 yards. Pat Harder scored 17 points on a touchdown run, two field goals, and five extra points. On defense, the Lions forced eight turnovers, including six fumble recoveries.

=== Week 11: Chicago ===
Team	1	2	3	4	Total
Chicago	7	7	0	7	21
• Detroit	14	7	10	14	45

- Date: December 7
- Location: Briggs Stadium, Detroit
- Game attendance: 50,410

On December 7, 1952, the Lions defeated the Chicago Bears, 45–21, before a crowd of 50,410 at Briggs Stadium. The game was the Lions' first victory over the Bears in Detroit since 1945. Bobby Layne and Cloyce Box connected for three touchdown passes in the first half: for 29 and 28 yards in the first quarter and for 25 yards in the second quarter. Layne also threw an 11-yard pass to Jim Doran in the third quarter. In all, Layne completed 22 of 35 passes for 296 yards. Detroit's defense held the Bears to 37 rushing yards and 171 passing yards and intercepted six Chicago passes. Defensive back Jack Christiansen also played at running back, rushing for 54 yards and a touchdown on six carries.

=== Week 12: Dallas ===
Team	1	2	3	4	Total
Dallas	0	0	0	6	6
• Detroit	0	14	10	17	41

- Date: December 13
- Location: Briggs Stadium, Detroit
- Game attendance: 12,252

On Saturday, December 13, 1952, the Lions defeated the Dallas Texans, 41–6, before a small crowd of 12,252 at Briggs Stadium. With the win and the Rams' victory the following day, the Lions and Rams became co-champions of the NFL's National Conference. The game had originally been scheduled for December 14 in Dallas, but the NFL assumed control of the Texans one month earlier, and NFL commissioner Bert Bell decided that the Texans would play their remaining games "on the road."

Bobby Layne led the Lions to a 14–0 lead in the first half on touchdown passes of 18 yards (a flea flicker with Layne passing to Cloyce Box who immediately lateraled the ball to Pat Harder) and 77 yards to Cloyce Box. Layne was injured (strained knee ligament) shortly before halftime and did not return to the game. Jim Hardy took over at quarterback and led the Lions to 27 points in the second half, including two touchdown passes to Box of 40 and 41 yards. Jack Christiansen also ran 65 yards for a touchdown in the fourth quarter, the Lions' longest rushing play of the season. Layne completed 10 of 20 passes for 167 yards, and Hardy completed nine of 15 passes for 147 yards. Box caught a total of seven passes for 202 yards and three touchdowns, setting a new Lions' team record with 15 touchdown receptions in a season. Harder scored 17 points in the game on a touchdown, two field goals, and five extra points.

=== Playoff game – Los Angeles ===
Team	1	2	3	4	Total
Los Angeles	0	7	0	14	21
• Detroit	7	7	10	7	31

- Date: December 21
- Location: Briggs Stadium, Detroit
- Game attendance: 47,645

On December 21, 1952, the Lions defeated the Los Angeles Rams, 31–21, in a playoff game to decide who would advance to the NFL Championship Game. The Lions had beaten the Rams twice in the regular season and were a 1½-point favorite in the playoff. The playoff game was played in heavy fog and rain at Briggs Stadium before a crowd of 47,645. Pat Harder led both teams with 72 rushing yards on eight carries and scored 19 points on two touchdown runs in the first half, a 43-yard field goal in the third quarter, and four extra points. The Rams double-teamed and sometimes triple-teamed Cloyce Box, which opened the running game and allowed Leon Hart to have one of his best receiving days. Hart scored in the third quarter on a 24-yard pass from Doak Walker.

=== NFL Championship Game ===
Team	1	2	3	4	Total
• Detroit	0	7	7	3	17
Cleveland	0	0	7	0	7

- Date: December 28
- Location: Memorial Stadium, Cleveland
- Game attendance: 50,934

On December 28, 1952, the Lions defeated the Cleveland Browns, 17–7, in the 1952 NFL Championship Game at Memorial Stadium in Cleveland. The Lions had defeated the Browns in both a preseason game and in a regular season game and were favored by 3½ points.

Bobby Layne rushed for a touchdown in the second quarter, and the Lions led, 7–0, at halftime. In the third quarter, Doak Walker ran 67 yards for a touchdown to extend the Lions' lead to 14 points. Walker's touchdown in the championship game was his first of the 1952 season. The Detroit Free Press wrote: "The Doaker was the Walker of old as he twisted and turned, eluded tackler after tackler and ran 67 yards for the Lions' second touchdown." The Browns narrowed the lead to 14–7 on a seven-yard touchdown run by Chick Jagade in the third quarter. Pat Harder added a 36-yard field goal in the fourth quarter. The Browns' outgained the Lions 384 yards to 258 and had 22 first downs to 10 for Detroit. The Lions' defense mounted four goal-line stands against the Browns' offense led by Otto Graham, and Lou Groza missed three field goal attempts.

== Standings ==
NFL National Conference
	W	L	T	PCT	CONF	PF	PA	STK
Detroit Lions	9	3	0	.750	7–3	344	192	W3
Los Angeles Rams	9	3	0	.750	8–2	349	234	W8
San Francisco 49ers	7	5	0	.583	6–3	285	221	W1
Green Bay Packers	6	6	0	.500	3–6	295	312	L3
Chicago Bears	5	7	0	.417	4–6	245	326	W1
Dallas Texans	1	11	0	.083	1–9	182	427	L2

Note: Tie games were not officially counted in the standings until 1972.

== Roster ==
1952 Detroit Lions roster
Quarterbacks (QB): 1 Jim Hardy; 19 Tom Dublinski; 22 Bobby Layne; Running backs (RB): 14 Bob Hoernschemeyer; 23 Jug Girard; 33 Ollie Cline; 34 Pat Harder K; 37 Doak Walker K; 45 Byron Bailey; Wide receivers (WR): 80 Cloyce Box; 81 Bill Swiacki; 82 Leon Hart; Tight ends (TE)	Offensive linemen (OL): 51 Vince Banonis C; 62 Jim Martin G/MLB; 63 Dick Stanfel G; 66 Stan Campbell G/T; 70 Gus Cifelli T; 76 Lou Creekmur T; Defensive linemen (DL): 65 Les Bingaman MG; 74 Bob Miller DT/T; 73 Thurman McGraw DT; 75 John Prchlik DT; 83 Jim Doran DE/WR; 85 Sonny Gandee DE; 86 Blaine Earon DE	Linebackers (LB): 40 Bob Smith OLB/P; 53 LaVern Torgeson MLB; 60 Dick Flanagan OLB; Defensive backs (DB): 24 Jack Christiansen S/RB; 25 Jim David CB; 28 Yale Lary CB/P; 44 Don Doll S; 48 Jim Hill CB/S; Special teams (ST)	Reserve: -- Jim Cain DE (Military); -- Gordon Cooper WR (Military); -- Dorne Dibble WR (Military); 20 Clyde Scott RB (IR); 84 Pat Summerall DE (IR); Rookies in italics

== Awards, honors and league leaders ==
=== Team awards ===
At the end of the regular season, the Lions players selected defensive end Jim Doran as the team's most valuable player.

=== All-NFL honors ===
The following six Lions players won All-NFL honors from the Associated Press (AP), United Press International (UPI) and/or the New York Daily News:

- Cloyce Box (1st team Associated Press [AP])
- Lou Creekmur (1st team AP, United Press [UP], and New York Daily News [DN])
- Pat Harder (2nd team, AP)
- Bob Hoernschemeyer (1st team DN, 2nd team AP/UP)
- Bobby Layneis the basketball

(1st team AP, 2nd team DN)

- Bob Smith (1st team UP and DN, 2nd team AP)

=== Pro Bowl ===
The following seven Lions players were selected to play in the 1953 Pro Bowl:

- Cloyce Box
- Lou Creekmur
- Don Doll
- Pat Harder
- Bob Hoernschemeyer
- Bobby Layne
- Bob Smith

=== NFL leaders ===
Several Lions players were also among the NFL leaders in various statistical categories, including the following:

- Cloyce Box

15 touchdowns (1st)
15 receiving touchdowns (1st)
90 points scored (2nd)
924 receiving yards (4th)
22.0 yards per reception (4th)
77.0 receiving yards per game (4th)
924 yards from scrimmage (6th)
42 receptions (9th)

- Jack Christiansen

21.5 yards per punt return (1st)
2 punt returns for touchdown (T-1st)
79-yard punt return (4th)
731 punt and kick return yards (4th)
65-yard rush (7th)
322 punt return yards (5th)
25.6 yards per kick return (6th)
409 kick return yards (10th)

- Blaine Earon

5 fumbles recovered (T-2nd)

- Pat Harder

85 points scored (4th)
34 extra points made (2nd)
11 field goals made (T-2nd)
47.826 field goal percentage (6th)

- Bob Hoernschemeyer

457 rushing yards (5th)
4.3 yards per rushing attempt (5th)
45.7 rushing yards per game (6th)

- Yale Lary

25.3 yards per kick return (T-7th)
182 punt return yards (8th)
11.4 yards per punt return (8th)
53-yard interception return (8th)
58-yard punt return (9th)

- Bobby Layne

2,410 yards total offense (2nd)
20 passes intercepted (2nd)
139 passes completed (3rd)
1,999 passing yards (3rd)
19 passing touchdowns (3rd)
166.6 passing yards per game (3rd)
4.4 yards per rushing attempt (4th)
48.4 pass completion percentage (7th)
411 rushing yards (7th)

- Bob Smith

44.7 yards per punt (2nd)
90-yard interception return (2nd)
9 interceptions (3rd)
184 interception return yards (3rd)
2,729 punting yards (6th)

=== Pro Football Hall of Fame ===
Six members of the team were later inducted into the Pro Football Hall of Fame. They are:

- Bobby Layne (inducted 1967)
- Jack Christiansen (inducted 1970)
- Yale Lary (inducted 1979)
- Doak Walker (inducted 1986)
- Lou Creekmur (inducted 1996)
- Dick Stanfel (inducted 2016)
