= Jack Christiansen =

American football player and coach (1928–1986)

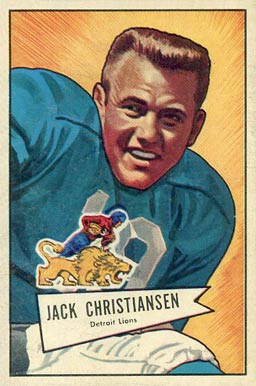
- Christiansen, c. 1952

No. 19, 24
- Positions: Safety, return specialist

Personal information
- Born: December 20, 1928; Sublette, Kansas, U.S.
- Died: June 29, 1986 (aged 57); Stanford, California, U.S.
- Listed height: 6 ft 1 in (1.85 m)
- Listed weight: 205 lb (93 kg)

Career information
- High school: Odd Fellows Orphanage (CO)
- College: Colorado A&M
- NFL draft: 1951: 6th round, 69th overall pick

Career history

Playing
- Detroit Lions (1951–1958)

Coaching
- San Francisco 49ers (1959–1963) Defensive backfield; San Francisco 49ers (1963-1967) Head coach; Stanford (1968–1971) Assistant coach; Stanford (1972–1976) Head coach; Kansas City Chiefs (1977) Running backs coach; Seattle Seahawks (1978–1982) Defensive backfield; Atlanta Falcons (1983) Secondary coach

Awards and highlights
- 3× NFL champion (1952, 1953, 1957); 6× First-team All-Pro (1952–1957); 5× Pro Bowl (1953–1957); 2× NFL interceptions leader (1953, 1957); NFL 100th Anniversary All-Time Team; NFL 1950s All-Decade Team; Pride of the Lions; Detroit Lions 75th Anniversary Team; Detroit Lions All-Time Team; Colorado Sports Hall of Fame; Colorado State Athletics Hall of Fame

Career NFL statistics
- Interceptions: 46
- Interception yards: 717
- Touchdowns: 3
- Stats at Pro Football Reference

Head coaching record
- Career: NFL: 26–38–3 (.410); NCAA: 30–22–3 (.573)
- Coaching profile at Pro Football Reference
- Pro Football Hall of Fame

Jack LeRoy Christiansen (December 20, 1928 – June 29, 1986) was an American professional football player who became a college and pro coach. He played professionally in the National Football League (NFL) for the Detroit Lions as a safety and return specialist from 1951 to 1958. He helped lead the Lions to three NFL championships in 1952, 1953, and 1957 and was a first-team All-NFL player in six of his eight years in the league. He led the NFL in interceptions in 1953 and 1957 and in punt returns for touchdown in 1951, 1952, 1954, and 1956. His eight career punt returns for touchdowns was an NFL record until 1989 and remains the fourth best in league history. He was inducted into the Pro Football Hall of Fame in 1970.

After retiring as a player, Christiansen served as a football coach for 25 years from 1959 to 1983, including stints as the head coach of the San Francisco 49ers, compiling a 26–38–3 record from 1963 to 1967, and at Stanford, where he compiled a 30–22–3 record from 1972 to 1976. He concluded his career as an assistant coach for the Kansas City Chiefs (1977), Seattle Seahawks (1978–1982), and Atlanta Falcons (1983).

== Early life and college ==
Christiansen was born in Sublette, Kansas, in 1928, and was raised an orphan at the Odd Fellows Orphanage in Cañon City, Colorado. He attended Colorado A&M in Fort Collins, where he received eight varsity letters in football, track, and baseball, won three Skyline Conference championships in the quarter mile, and received all-conference honors in football twice. He graduated with a bachelor's degree in 1951.

== Professional career ==
Christiansen was selected in the sixth round of the 1951 NFL draft, 69th overall, by the Detroit Lions. As a rookie in 1951, he appeared in all 12 games as a defensive halfback for the Lions. In his third NFL game, playing in front of "the largest crowd ever to see a football game in Detroit" (52,907 in attendance), he returned two punts for touchdowns (returns of 69 and 47 yards) against the Los Angeles Rams. Six weeks later, Christiansen repeated the feat, returning two punts for touchdowns (returns of 71 and 89 yards) against the Green Bay Packers on Thanksgiving Day in Detroit. He returned 18 punts for a total of 343 yards (19.1 yards per return), as the 1951 Lions compiled a 7–4–1 record and finished in second place in the NFL's Western Division.

In 1952, he helped lead the Lions to an NFL championship, the second in franchise history. Christiansen returned 15 punts for 322 yards and two touchdowns, and his average of 21.5 yards per punt return during the 1952 season remains an NFL record. His longest return in 1952 was for 79 yards with two minutes remaining against the Chicago Bears at Wrigley Field on November 23. Christiansen also played as a halfback on offense, rushing for 54 yards and a touchdown on nine carries against the Chicago Bears on December 7, and for 94 yards, including a 65-yard touchdown run, against the Dallas Texans on December 13. At the end of the season, Christiansen was selected by the Associated Press (AP) as a first-team All-NFL player.

In 1953, Christiansen helped lead the Lions to their second consecutive NFL championship. While his punt return numbers declined (eight returns for only 22 yards), he became a starter at left halfback and developed a reputation as one of the best pass defenders in the NFL. He led the NFL with 12 interceptions, 238 interception return yards, and a 93-yard interception return. Despite playing in only 11 games in 1953, his 12 interceptions remains tied for the fifth highest single-season tally in NFL history. At the end of the season, he was selected by the AP and United Press International (UPI) as a first-team All-NFL player and was invited to play in the Pro Bowl.

Christiansen became an integral part of the defensive backfield, a unit that would become known as "Chris's Crew," in tribute to his leadership. He continued this high standard of play, tying for the interception lead with 10 picks in 1957 to help the Lions win their third title in six years. His 46 career interceptions ranks fourth on the Lions' all-time list. As a punt returner, he had 85 returns for 1,084 yards, and his 12.8 average still stands as a Detroit record and is third all-time in NFL history.

He is tied with Lem Barney at 11 for the most return touchdowns in Detroit history. Christiansen still has the team record with eight punt return touchdowns. He was the first player in NFL history to record two punt return touchdowns in the same game.

After winning All-Pro six consecutive years from (1952–1957) and playing in five consecutive Pro Bowls beginning in 1954, Christiansen was inducted into the Pro Football Hall of Fame in 1970. He was an All-NFL defensive back for six-straight years, played in five Pro Bowls (opening the 1956 game with a 103-yard kickoff return) and led the league in interceptions twice.

== Coaching career ==
=== San Francisco 49ers ===
Christiansen as an assistant coach for the 49ers in 1961.

In January 1959, Christiansen announced that he was retiring as a player to accept a position as an assistant coach with the San Francisco 49ers under head coach Red Hickey. He served as a defensive backfield coach with the 49ers for four years, from 1959 to 1962. In late September 1963, with the 49ers in the midst of a 10-game losing streak, including all five pre-season games and the first three regular-season games of the 1963 season, Hickey resigned, and Christiansen, at age 34, took over as the 49ers' head coach. In that season's final 11 games, the 49ers won only twice, but held the distinction of being the only team to defeat the eventual NFL champion Chicago Bears.

Over the succeeding four years, San Francisco continued to struggle, with Christiansen's best season coming in 1965 when the team was 7–6–1. The 49ers began the 1967 season with five wins in their first six games, but won only two more games the remainder of the campaign, resulting in Christiansen's dismissal on December 20, ending his tenure with a record of 26–38–3.

=== Colorado State ===
In January 1968, Christiansen was hired by his alma mater, Colorado State, as a consultant to review and make recommendations concerning the university's athletic program.

=== Stanford ===
In April 1968, Christiansen was hired as an assistant coach under John Ralston at Stanford. During this period, Stanford pulled off consecutive Rose Bowl upsets of Ohio State and Michigan, both previously undefeated. In January 1972, Ralston left to coach the NFL's Denver Broncos, and Christiansen was promoted to head coach.

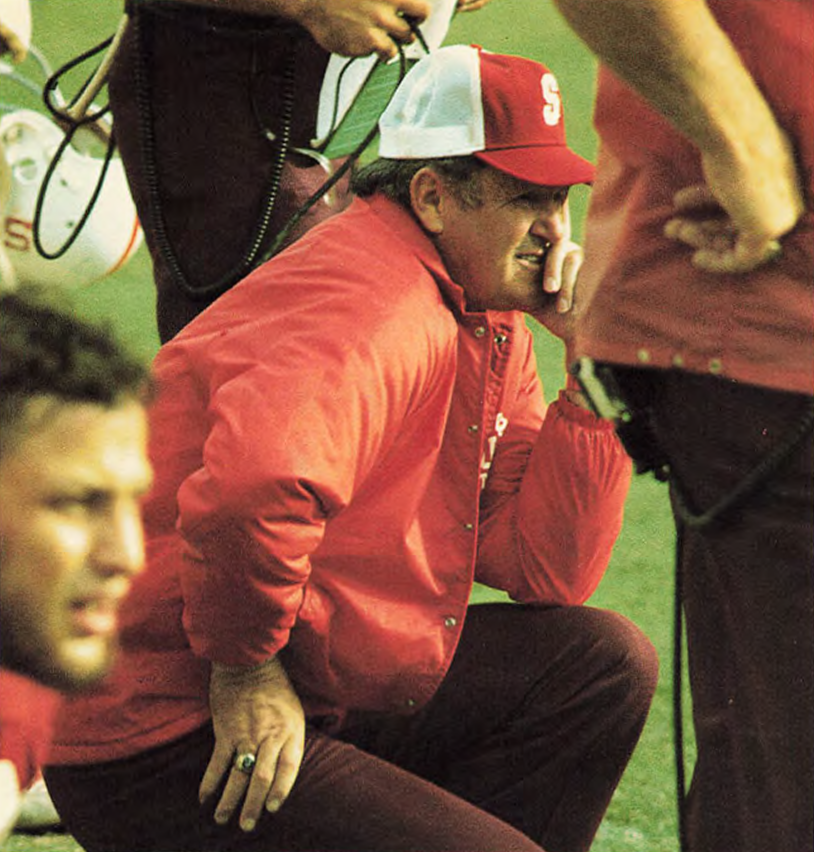
Christiansen at Stanford, c. 1976

Christiansen spent five years as Stanford's head coach, compiling a winning record each year and a 30–22–3 overall record. He was criticized for starting Mike Cordova rather than Guy Benjamin at quarterback during the 1975 season and for switching between quarterbacks during the 1976 season. One day prior to the final game of the 1976 season, Stanford announced that it was terminating Christiansen as its head coach.

=== Kansas City Chiefs ===
In March 1977, Christiansen was hired as an assistant coach, responsible for running backs, under Paul Wiggin with the Kansas City Chiefs. Wiggin was fired in the middle of the season, as the Chiefs compiled a 2–12 record.

=== Seattle Seahawks ===
In April 1978, Christiansen was hired by the Seattle Seahawks, replacing Bob Holloway as the team's defensive backfield coach. He spent five years as the Seahawks' defensive backfield coach, from 1978 to 1982.

=== Atlanta Falcons ===
In February 1983, Christiansen was hired by the Atlanta Falcons as its secondary coach. In January 1984, Christiansen resigned his position with the Falcons after being diagnosed with cancer.

== Honors, family, and later years ==
After his playing career ended, he received numerous honors, including the following:

- In 1967, he was inducted into the Colorado Sports Hall of Fame. He was the first Colorado State athlete to be so honored.
- In 1969, he was named as a starting safety on the NFL's 1950s All-Decade Team.
- In 1970, he was inducted into the Pro Football Hall of Fame.
- In 1977, he was selected by Pro Football Digest as the safety on its all-time all-pro football team of 25 players.
- In 1986, weeks prior to his death, he was inducted into the Michigan Sports Hall of Fame.
- In 1988, he was posthumously inducted into the Colorado State University Athletic Hall of Fame.
- In 1999, he was ranked number 86 on The Sporting News' list of the 100 Greatest Football Players.
- Also in 1999, he was selected as both a safety and punt returner on the Detroit Free Press' all-time Lions team.

Christiansen and his wife, Doris, had four daughters. He retired from coaching in 1984 after being diagnosed with cancer. He died in June 1986 at age 57 after undergoing surgery at Stanford Hospital in Palo Alto, California.

== Head coaching record ==
=== NFL ===
Team	Year	Regular season					Postseason			
Team	Year	Won	Lost	Ties	Win %	Finish	Won	Lost	Win %	Result
SF	1963	2	9	0	.182	7th in NFL Western	-	-	-	
SF	1964	4	10	0	.286	7th in NFL Western	-	-	-	
SF	1965	7	6	1	.536	4th in NFL Western	-	-	-	
SF	1966	6	6	2	.500	4th in NFL Western	-	-	-	
SF	1967	7	7	0	.500	3rd in NFL Coastal	-	-	-	
SF total		26	38	3	.410		-	-	-	
Total		26	38	3	.410		-	-	-	

=== College ===
Year	Team	Overall	Conference	Standing
Stanford Cardinals (Pacific-8 Conference) (1972–1976)
1972	Stanford	6–5	2–5	T–6th
1973	Stanford	7–4	5–2	3rd
1974	Stanford	5–4–2	5–1–1	2nd
1975	Stanford	6–4–1	5–2	T–3rd
1976	Stanford	6–5	5–2	3rd
Stanford:		30–22–3	22–12–1	
Total:		30–22–3		
