= Cloyce Box =

American football player and businessman (1923–1993)

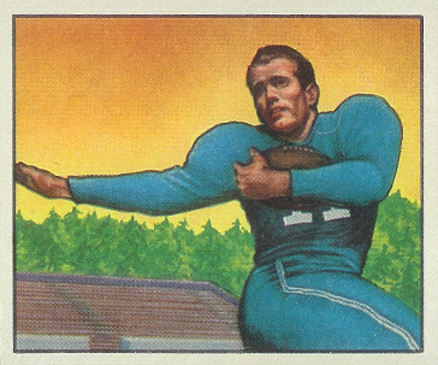
- Box on a 1950 Bowman football card

No. 11, 80
- Positions: End, halfback

Personal information
- Born: August 24, 1923; Hamilton, Texas, U.S.
- Died: October 27, 1993 (aged 70); Frisco, Texas, U.S.
- Listed height: 6 ft 4 in (1.93 m)
- Listed weight: 220 lb (100 kg)

Career information
- High school: Waco (Waco, Texas)
- College: Louisiana Tech; West Texas A&M (1946, 1948–1949)
- NFL draft: 1948: 20th round, 178th overall pick

Career history
- Detroit Lions (1949–1950, 1952–1954)

Awards and highlights
- 2× NFL champion (1952, 1953); First-team All-Pro (1952); Second-team All-Pro (1950); 2× Pro Bowl (1950, 1952); NFL receiving touchdowns leader (1952)

Career NFL statistics
- Receptions: 129
- Receiving yards: 2,665
- Receiving touchdowns: 32
- Stats at Pro Football Reference

Cloyce Kennedy Box (August 24, 1923 – October 27, 1993) was an American professional football player and businessman. He played five years in the National Football League (NFL) with the Detroit Lions, was a member of NFL championship teams in 1952 and 1953, was selected as a second-team All-Pro in 1950 and a first-team All-Pro in 1952, and played in the 1951 and 1953 Pro Bowl games. On December 3, 1950, he set Detroit team records with 12 catches, four touchdown receptions, 24 points, and 302 receiving yards. He later became successful in the oil and gas business in Texas.

== Early life ==
Box was born in 1923 in Hamilton, Texas. From 1938 to 1942, he attended Jonesboro High School in Jonesboro, Texas, where he and his twin brother Boyce Box were both star athletes. He never saw a game of football until he was 18 years old, having played basketball throughout his youth.

== College career ==
Box and his brother Boyce attended West Texas A&M University on basketball scholarships and helped the Buffaloes win a Border Conference championship in 1943 before being inducted into the United States Marine Corps. He attained the rank of captain during World War II. Box also attended Louisiana Tech University as part of the V-12 Navy College Training Program. When he returned from the Marine Corps in 1946, the West Texas A&M basketball program slumped, and Box ended up playing college football as a quarterback and halfback for the West Texas A&M Buffaloes football team from 1946 to 1948.

== Professional career ==
Box played professional football at the end and halfback positions in the National Football League (NFL) for five seasons with the Detroit Lions from 1949 to 1950 and 1952 to 1954. As a rookie in 1949, Box appeared in ten games, principally as a halfback. He rushed for 62 yards on 30 carries and caught 15 passes for 276 yards and four touchdowns. Box later recalled: "I probably was the worst halfback in the history of the league."

In 1950, Box's second year in the NFL, Detroit's coaches sought to take advantage of Box's speed and converted him into an end. Teaming up with Lions' quarterback Bobby Layne, Box appeared in 12 games and ranked among the league's leading receivers with 50 receptions (third), 1,009 receiving yards (second), 11 receiving touchdowns (second), 84.1 receiving yards per game (second), and 1,009 yards from scrimmage (second). On December 3, 1950, in a game against the Baltimore Colts, he set Detroit team records with 12 catches, four touchdown receptions, 24 points, and 302 receiving yards. His 302 receiving yards against the Colts was the second highest in NFL history at the time and currently ranks fifth in league history. After the 1950 season, Box was selected by the Associated Press (AP) as a second-team end on its All-Pro team.

In February 1951, with the Korean War ongoing, Box was recalled from inactive reserve status by the United States Marine Corps. He missed the entire 1951 season due to military service.

In June 1952, after being discharged from the Marine Corps, Box returned to the Lions. Box was the leading receiver on the 1952 Lions team that won the NFL championship, recording 15 touchdowns on 42 receptions for 924 yards. Box scored three touchdowns in three different games that season; no Lions player would do so again until 2025. On October 19, 1952, he led a comeback victory over the Los Angeles Rams, with touchdown catches covering 64 and 10 yards. He led the NFL with 15 receiving touchdowns, ranked second in the league with 90 points scored, and again ranked among the league leaders with 924 receiving yards (fourth), 22.0 yards per reception (fourth), and 924 yards from scrimmage (sixth). His yards per reception in 1952 are still the most ever in Lions team history while his 15 touchdowns remained a team record until 2011. In the 1952 NFL Championship Game, a 17–7 victory over the Cleveland Browns, Box was used mainly as a decoy but was credited with a key block on Doak Walker's 67-yard touchdown run. After the 1952 season, Box was selected by the AP as a first-team All Pro player and was selected to play in the 1953 Pro Bowl.

In 1953, the Lions won their second consecutive NFL championship, though Box's receiving statistics declined significantly with only 16 receptions for 403 yards. He was reportedly "robbed of his blinding speed by a leg injury", though he did manage a career-long 97-yard touchdown reception against the Green Bay Packers on Thanksgiving Day 1953 which would remain a Lions record until 1998. In the 1953 NFL Championship Game, he had four receptions for 54 yards.

In 1954, Box's final year in the NFL, he appeared in 11 games but caught only six passes for 53 yards. Over the course of his five years with the Lions, Box totaled 129 receptions for 2,665 yards and 32 touchdowns.

== Business career and later life ==
After retiring from football, Box had a long career in business. He began in 1954 as an assistant manager in the Dallas office of the George A. Fuller Company, eventually serving as chairman of the board. Box became president of the Oklahoma Cement Company and president and chairman of OKC Corporation, which later became known as the Box Energy Corporation.

Box later partnered with world renowned real estate developer Trammel Crow to form the BoxCrow Cement Company. By 1986, BoxCrow had invested $177 million ($420 million in 2020) to construct a modern, 1 million ton per-year Portland cement production plant in Midlothian, Texas just south of the Dallas-Fort Worth metroplex. The Midlothian plant is currently owned and operated by LafargeHolcim and has since expanded to produce over 2 million tons of cement per year.

Box also served as chairman of the board of regents for West Texas State University and the Texas Board of Penal Corrections. Box was also inducted into the West Texas State University Business Hall of Fame. His Cloyce Box Ranch was used as the original Southfork Ranch for the mini-series that became the first season of the television series Dallas.

In 1982, Box hosted a reunion for his 1952 Lions teammates at the site of Super Bowl XVI. At the time, the 1952 Lions were the last championship team that had not received a ring, so Box presented each of his teammates with championship rings that he paid for personally. That same winter, he established a trust fund for the purpose of helping former NFL players experiencing financial difficulty by contributing $1 million ($2.7 million in 2020) of his own money.

Box and his wife, Fern Virginia Box, had four sons: Don, Gary, Thomas and Douglas. Box later married his second wife Ashley Scott Box. They lived in Frisco, Texas, for more than 30 years. Box died of a heart attack at his home in Frisco in 1993, at the age of 70. At his funeral, Frank Gifford gave Box's eulogy while Kathie Lee Gifford sang at the service.

== NFL career statistics ==
Legend
	Won NFL championship
	Led the league
**Bold**	Career high

=== Regular season ===
Year	Team	Games		Receiving				
Year	Team	GP	GS	Rec	Yds	Avg	Lng	TD
1949	DET	10	4	15	276	18.4	43	4
1950	DET	**12**	**11**	**50**	**1,009**	20.2	82	11
1952	DET	**12**	8	42	924	22.0	77	**15**
1953	DET	**12**	**11**	16	403	**25.2**	**97**	2
1954	DET	11	0	6	53	8.8	14	0
Career		57	34	129	2,665	20.7	97	32
