= Robert Hoernschemeyer =

American football player (1925–1980)

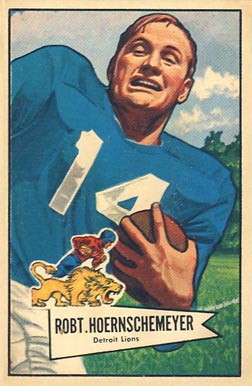
- Hoernschemeyer on a 1952 Bowman football card

No. 64, 90, 14
- Position: Running back

Personal information
- Born: September 25, 1925; Cincinnati, Ohio, U.S.
- Died: June 18, 1980 (aged 54); Detroit, Michigan, U.S.
- Listed height: 5 ft 11 in (1.80 m)
- Listed weight: 194 lb (88 kg)

Career information
- High school: Elder (Cincinnati)
- College: Indiana (1943-1944); Navy (1945)
- NFL draft: 1947: 11th round, 94th overall pick

Career history
- Chicago Rockets (1946-1947); Brooklyn Dodgers (1947–1948); Chicago Hornets (1949); Detroit Lions (1950–1955)

Awards and highlights
- 2× NFL champion (1952, 1953); 2× Second-team All-Pro (1952, 1953); 2× Pro Bowl (1951, 1952); Third-team All-American (1943); NCAA passing yards leader (1943); First-team All-Big Ten (1943); Second-team All-Big Ten (1944)

Career NFL/AAFC statistics
- Rushing yards: 4,548
- Rushing average: 4.3
- Rushing touchdowns: 27
- Receptions: 109
- Receiving yards: 1,139
- Receiving touchdowns: 11
- Passing yards: 4,302
- TD-INT: 42-56
- Stats at Pro Football Reference

Robert James "Hunchy" Hoernschemeyer (/ˈhɔːrnʃmaɪər/ HORNSH-my-ər; September 25, 1925 – June 18, 1980) was an American professional football player in the All-America Football Conference (AAFC) and National Football League (NFL). A native of Cincinnati, he played college football as a halfback for the Indiana Hoosiers football in 1943 and 1944 and as a quarterback for the Navy Midshipmen football team in 1945. He led the National Collegiate Athletic Association (NCAA) in both total offense and passing yards during the 1943 season.

He played professionally for 10 years in the AAFC and NFL. He played for the Chicago Rockets and Brooklyn Dodgers from 1946 to 1948 and was among the AAFC leaders in multiple offensive categories and, when the league folded in 1950, Hoernschemeyer held the league record with 6,218 yards of total offense (4,109 passing yards and 2,109 rushing yards). He then played six years in the NFL with the Detroit Lions from 1950 to 1955. He was the Lions' leading rusher for four consecutive years and was a member of the club's 1952 and 1953 NFL championship teams. He played in the 1951 and 1952 Pro Bowls and was selected as a second-team All-Pro player in 1952 and 1953.

The Professional Football Researchers Association named Hoernschemeyer to the PRFA Hall of Very Good Class of 2008.

== Early life ==
Hoernschemeyer was born in 1925 in Cincinnati, Ohio. He attended Cincinnati's Elder High School, where he became an all-city football player. During a 1942 game, he accounted for all 27 points scored by Elder, on touchdown runs of 21 and 41 yards, a touchdown pass, an interception return of 45 yards for a fourth touchdown and three extra points.

== College football ==
Hoernschemeyer enrolled at Indiana University. He began playing for Bo McMillin's Indiana Hoosiers football team at age 17 in 1943. He led the NCAA in 1943 with 1,648 yards of total offense and 1,133 passing yards.

In 1944, Hoernschemeyer was inducted into the United States Navy. He was assigned to the Bainbridge Navy Training Center in Maryland, but he was granted a "special order discharge" allowing him to return to Indiana in the fall of 1944, pending his entry into the United States Military Academy. He missed the first game of Indiana's 1944 season but returned to campus two days before the team's game against Illinois. He played only 18 minutes against Illinois. After returning to the starting lineup, he helped lead the 1944 Hoosiers to shutout victories over Michigan (20–0), Nebraska (54–0), Iowa (32–0), and Pittsburgh (47–0).

In the summer of 1945, Hoernschemeyer entered the Naval Academy. Playing at the quarterback position, he helped lead the 1945 Navy Midshipmen football team to a 7–1–1 record and a #3 ranking in the final AP Poll, with the only loss coming to #1 Army. He left the Naval Academy in February 1946 "due to academic deficiencies."

== Professional football ==
=== AAFC ===
In July 1946, Hoernschemeyer signed to play with the Chicago Rockets in the All-America Football Conference (AAFC). As a rookie, he ranked among the AAFC leaders with 1,266 passing yards (4th), 14 passing touchdowns (2nd), 375 rushing yards (9th), 366 punt and kick return yards (9th), and 3.4 yards per rushing attempt (5th).

After playing the first two games of the 1947 season with the Rockets, Hoernschemeyer was traded to the Brooklyn Dodgers in a three-team deal that sent the league's 1946 MVP Glenn Dobbs from the Dodgers to the Los Angeles Dons and 1943 Heisman Trophy winner Angelo Bertelli to the Rockets. Hoernschemeyer was again among the AAFC leaders in 1947 with 704 rushing yards (6th) and 926 passing yards (8th). On October 17, 1947, he broke two AAFC records in a game against the Buffalo Bills – an 84-yard run and 179 yards for the game.

He continued to play for the Brooklyn Dodgers in 1948. When the Dodgers merged with the New York Yankees in early 1949, Hoernschemeyer was assigned to the Chicago team by then known as the Hornets. Playing at the halfback position for the Hornets in 1949, he was among the AAFC leaders with 1,519 yards of total offense (5th), 1,063 passing yards (5th), 456 rushing yards (10th), and 373 kick return yards (4th).

When the AAFC folded, Hoernschemeyer, with five years experience, held the league record for total offense as a passer and rusher.

=== Detroit Lions ===
When the AAFC folded, Hoernschemeyer was selected by the Detroit Lions in a special draft of AAFC talent conducted in June 1950. In his first NFL season, he led the Lions with 471 rushing yards on 84 carries, and his average of 5.6 yards per carry was the third highest in the NFL. On Thanksgiving Day 1950, he set two Detroit club records, rushing for 198 yards and a 96-yard touchdown run against the New York Yankees. His 96-yard run remains tied for the sixth longest in NFL history.

He led the Lions in rushing again in 1951 with 678 yards (fourth most in the NFL) on 132 carries. He helped lead the 1951 Lions to a 7–4–1 record and second place in the NFL National Division. For the second year in a row, his biggest play occurred on Thanksgiving Day, this time an 85-yard run against the Green Bay Packers that proved to be the longest run of the year in the NFL. After the 1951 season, he was selected to play in the 1952 Pro Bowl.

In his third NFL season, he helped the 1952 Detroit Lions win the NFL championship. For the third consecutive season, he led the team in rushing yards (457). In the post-season, he rushed 18 times for 76 yards and a touchdown. After the 1952 season, Hoernschemeyer was selected as second-team All-Pro by both the Associated Press and United Press. He was also selected to play in the 1953 Pro Bowl.

In 1953, he led the Lions in rushing (482 yards) for the fourth consecutive year, helping the Lions win their second consecutive NFL championship. He was selected by the United Press as a second-team All-Pro player in 1953.

Hoernschemeyer remained with the Lions during the 1954 and 1955 seasons, but his production declined to 242 rushing yards in 1954 and 109 rushing yards in 1955. He suffered a shoulder separation against the Pittsburgh Steelers on November 13, 1955, ending his NFL career at age 30.

When he retired in 1955, he ranked 7th in yards from scrimmage (5,687) in NFL history.

== NFL/AAFC career statistics ==
Legend
	Won the NFL championship
	Led the league
**Bold**	Career high

=== Regular season ===
Year	Team	Games		Rushing					Receiving				
Year	Team	GP	GS	Att	Yds	Avg	Lng	TD	Rec	Yds	Avg	Lng	TD
1946	CHR	14	10	111	375	3.4	57	0	1	11	11.0	11	0
1947	CHR	2	2	5	2	0.4	-	0	1	4	4.0	4	1
1947	BDA	12	5	**147**	**702**	4.8	84	5	0	0	0.0	0	0
1948	BDA	14	6	110	574	5.2	61	3	11	173	**15.7**	42	**3**
1949	CHH	12	12	133	456	3.4	-	2	0	0	0.0	0	0
1950	DET	10	8	84	471	**5.6**	**96**	1	8	78	9.8	41	1
1951	DET	11	11	132	678	5.1	85	2	**23**	263	11.4	**48**	**3**
1952	DET	10	10	106	457	4.3	41	4	17	139	8.2	28	0
1953	DET	12	12	101	482	4.8	49	**7**	**23**	**282**	12.3	35	2
1954	DET	11	6	94	242	2.6	35	2	20	153	7.7	26	1
1955	DET	5	2	36	109	3.0	10	1	5	36	7.2	15	0
Career		113	84	1,059	4,548	4.3	96	27	109	1,139	10.4	48	11

=== Playoffs ===
Year	Team	Games		Rushing					Receiving				
Year	Team	GP	GS	Att	Yds	Avg	Lng	TD	Rec	Yds	Avg	Lng	TD
1952	DET	2	1	**18**	**76**	**4.2**	10	**1**	0	0	0.0	0	0
1953	DET	1	1	17	51	3.0	**16**	0	**2**	-2	-1.0	**1**	0
1954	DET	1	0	2	2	1.0	3	0	0	0	0.0	0	0
Career		4	2	37	129	3.5	16	1	2	-2	-1.0	1	0

== Later life ==
After retiring from football, Hoernschemeyer and former Lions teammate, Jug Girard, operated a bar known as the Lions Den on Detroit's east side. He owned the bar until 1966. In 1968, he began working for the Ford Motor Company where he remained until his death. Hoernschemeyer and his wife, Marybelle had a son and four daughters. In June 1980, after a 62-day hospitalization and a two-year fight with cancer, he died at St. Johns Hospital in Detroit at age 54.

== See also ==
- List of NCAA major college football yearly passing leaders
- List of NCAA major college football yearly total offense leaders
