= 1952 Green Bay Packers season =

NFL team season

- Head coach: Gene Ronzani
- Home stadium: City Stadium; Marquette Stadium

Results
- Record: 6–6
- Division place: 4th National
- Playoffs: Did not qualify

The 1952 Green Bay Packers season was their 34th season overall and their 32nd season in the National Football League. The team finished with a 6–6 record under third-year head coach Gene Ronzani for a fourth-place finish in the National Conference in 1952. After climbing to a 6–3 record, the Packers lost their final three games, but the .500 record was their best since 1947.

The Packers played their Milwaukee home games in Marquette Stadium during this season only, after using Wisconsin State Fair Park from 1934 through 1951. The new County Stadium became the venue in 1953, and hosted the Milwaukee home games through 1994, when they were discontinued.

Head coach Ronzani was a Marquette University alumnus (1933) and won nine varsity letters in college.

== Offseason ==
=== NFL draft ===
Round	Pick	Player	Position	School/club team
1	4	Babe Parilli	Quarterback	Kentucky
2	15	Billy Howton	Wide receiver	Rice
3	28	Bobby Dillon	Defensive back	Texas
5	52	Dave Hanner	Defensive tackle	Arkansas
6	63	Tom Johnson	Defensive tackle	Michigan
7	76	Bill Reichardt	Fullback	Iowa
8	87	Mel Becket	Center	Indiana
9	100	Deral Teteak	Linebacker	Wisconsin
10	111	Art Kleinschmidt	Guard	Tulane
10	116	Bud Roffler	Back	Washington State
11	124	Billy Burkhalter	Back	Rice
12	135	Bill Wilson	Tackle	Texas
13	148	Billy Hair	Back	Clemson
14	159	Jack Morgan	Tackle	Michigan State
15	172	Bobby Jack Floyd	Fullback	TCU
16	183	Johnny Coatta	Back	Wisconsin
17	196	Don Peterson	Back	Michigan
18	207	Howard Tisdale	Tackle	Stephen F. Austin
19	220	Johnny Pont	Tackle	Miami (OH)
20	231	Chuck Boerio	Linebacker	Illinois
21	244	Herb Zimmerman	Guard	TCU
22	255	Karl Kluckhohn	End	Colgate
23	268	Frank Kapral	Guard	Michigan State
24	279	John Schuetzner	End	South Carolina
25	292	Charlie LaPradd	Tackle	Florida
26	303	Charlie Stokes	Tackle	Tennessee
27	316	I. D. Russell	Back	SMU
28	327	Billy Barrett	Back	Notre Dame
29	340	Bill Stratton	Back	Lewis
30	351	Jack Fulkerson	Tackle	Southern Miss

- Yellow indicates a future Pro Bowl selection

== Regular season ==
=== Schedule ===
Week	Date	Opponent	Result	Record	Venue	Attendance
1	September 28	**Chicago Bears**	**L** 14–24	0–1	City Stadium	24,656
2	October 5	Washington Redskins	**W** 35–20	1–1	Marquette Stadium	9,657
3	October 12	**Los Angeles Rams**	**L** 28–30	1–2	Marquette Stadium	21,693
4	October 18	at **Dallas Texans**	**W** 24–14	2–2	Cotton Bowl	14,000
5	October 26	**Detroit Lions**	**L** 17–52	2–3	City Stadium	24,656
6	November 2	Philadelphia Eagles	**W** 12–10	3–3	Marquette Stadium	10,149
7	November 9	at **Chicago Bears**	**W** 41–28	4–3	Wrigley Field	41,751
8	November 16	at New York Giants	**W** 17–3	5–3	Polo Grounds	26,723
9	November 23	**Dallas Texans**	**W** 42–14	6–3	City Stadium	16,340
10	November 27	at **Detroit Lions**	**L** 24–48	6–4	Briggs Stadium	39,101
11	December 7	at **Los Angeles Rams**	**L** 27–45	6–5	Los Angeles Memorial Coliseum	49,822
12	December 14	at **San Francisco 49ers**	**L** 14–24	6–6	Kezar Stadium	17,579
Note: Intra-conference opponents are in **bold** text.

=== Game summaries ===
==== Week 7 ====
Team	1	2	3	4	Total
• Packers	7	10	7	17	41
Bears	7	0	7	14	28

- Date: November 9
- Location: Wrigley Field
- Game attendance: 41,751

Scoring summary
Q1	GB	Howton 19-yard pass from Parilli (Cone kick)	GB 7–0
Q1	CHI	Campbell 86-yard kickoff return (Blanda kick)	Tie 7–7
Q2	GB	Cone 1-yard run (Cone kick)	GB 14–7
Q2	GB	Cone 12-yard field goal	GB 17–7
Q3	GB	Cone 37-yard pass from Rote (Cone kick)	GB 24–7
Q3	CHI	Macon 89-yard kickoff return (Blanda kick)	GB 24–14
Q4	GB	Martinkovic ?-yard fumble return (Cone kick)	GB 31–14
Q4	GB	Reichardt 37-yard field goal	GB 34–14
Q4	GB	Mann 27-yard pass from Parilli (Cone kick)	GB 41–14
Q4	CHI	Schroeder 48-yard pass from Romanik (Blanda kick)	GB 41–21
Q4	CHI	Morrison 12-yard pass from Romanik (Blanda kick)	GB 41–28

== Standings ==
NFL National Conference
	W	L	T	PCT	CONF	PF	PA	STK
Detroit Lions	9	3	0	.750	7–3	344	192	W3
Los Angeles Rams	9	3	0	.750	8–2	349	234	W8
San Francisco 49ers	7	5	0	.583	6–3	285	221	W1
Green Bay Packers	6	6	0	.500	3–6	295	312	L3
Chicago Bears	5	7	0	.417	4–6	245	326	W1
Dallas Texans	1	11	0	.083	1–9	182	427	L2

Note: Tie games were not officially counted in the standings until 1972.

== Roster ==
1952 Green Bay Packers final roster
Quarterbacks: 15 Babe Parilli P; 18 Tobin Rote; Running backs: 3 Tony Canadeo; 33 Bobby Jack Floyd; 22 Billy Grimes; 26 Lindy Pearson; 37 Bill Reichardt K; 24 Breezy Reid; Receivers: 80 Carlton Elliott DE; 86 Billy Howton; 81 Jim Keane; 87 Bob Mann	Offensive linemen: 62 Dick Afflis T; 70 Steve Dowden T; 67 Dick Logan G; 50 Jay Rhodemyre C; 61 Steve Ruzich G; 73 Wash Serini G/T; 69 Dave Stephenson G/C; Defensive linemen: 63 Ray Bray MG; 76 Bob Dees DT; 77 Dave Hanner DT/T; 72 Tom Johnson DT/T; 83 John Martinkovic DE; 85 Abner Wimberly DE	Linebackers: 51 Hal Faverty OLB; 8 Bob Forte OLB; 66 Deral Teteak MLB; Defensive backs: 44 Bobby Dillon CB; 41 Marvin Johnson CB/S; 43 Ace Loomis CB; 20 Dan Sandifer S; 28 Clarence Self CB	Reserve: 31 Fred Cone RB (IR); 47 Dom Moselle S (IR); 75 Howie Ruetz DT (IR); -- Len Szafaryn T (Military); -- Clayton Tonnemaker LB (Military); Rookies in italics
