= Dick Flanagan =

American football player (1927–1997)

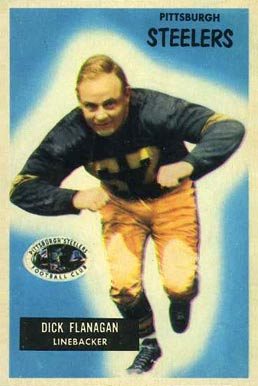
- Flanagan on a 1955 Bowman football card

No. 9, 74, 60, 57
- Positions: Linebacker, guard, center

Personal information
- Born: October 31, 1926; Sidney, Ohio, U.S.
- Died: September 23, 1997 (aged 70); Sidney, Ohio, U.S.
- Listed height: 6 ft 0 in (1.83 m)
- Listed weight: 216 lb (98 kg)

Career information
- High school: Sidney
- College: Ohio State
- NFL draft: 1948: 10th round, 83rd overall pick

Career history
- Chicago Bears (1948–1950); Detroit Lions (1950-1952); Pittsburgh Steelers (1953–1955)

Awards and highlights
- NFL champion (1952)

Career NFL statistics
- Games played: 84
- Games started: 53
- Fumble recoveries: 8
- Stats at Pro Football Reference

Richard E. Flanagan (October 31, 1927 – September 27, 1997) was a National Football League (NFL) center who played eight seasons. Flanagan played high school football for Sidney High School and college football for Ohio State University. He was selected 83rd overall by the Chicago Bears in the 10th round of the 1948 NFL draft. He played running back in college and his first year with the Bears. He also played linebacker and offensive guard during his professional career. Flanagan was a member of the Detroit Lions team that defeated the Cleveland Browns to win the 1952 NFL Championship.

== Honors ==
The Flanagan Sports Complex in Sidney is named after him.

The Sidney High School football MVP trophy is named after Flanagan and his jersey number has been retired by the school.
