= 1952 Chicago Bears season =

NFL team season

- Owner: George Halas
- Head coach: George Halas
- Home stadium: Wrigley Field

Results
- Record: 5–7
- Division place: 5th NFL National
- Playoffs: Did not qualify

The 1952 season was the Chicago Bears' 33rd in the National Football League. The team failed to improve on their 7–5 record from 1951 and finished at 5–7 under head coach and owner George Halas, fifth in the NFL's National Conference. In 1952, the club continued its downward trend from the class of the league.

== Regular season ==
=== Schedule ===
Week	Date	Opponent	Result	Record	Venue	Attendance
1	September 28	at **Green Bay Packers**	**W** 24–14	1–0	City Stadium	24,656
2	October 5	at Chicago Cardinals	**L** 10–21	1–1	Comiskey Park	34,697
3	October 12	**Dallas Texans**	**W** 38–20	2–1	Wrigley Field	35,429
4	October 19	**San Francisco 49ers**	**L** 16–40	2–2	Wrigley Field	46,338
5	October 26	at **Los Angeles Rams**	**L** 7–31	2–3	Los Angeles Memorial Coliseum	43,574
6	November 2	at **San Francisco 49ers**	**W** 20–17	3–3	Kezar Stadium	58,255
7	November 9	**Green Bay Packers**	**L** 28–41	3–4	Wrigley Field	41,751
8	November 16	**Los Angeles Rams**	**L** 24–40	3–5	Wrigley Field	40,737
9	November 23	**Detroit Lions**	**W** 24–23	4–5	Wrigley Field	37,508
10	November 27	at **Dallas Texans**	**L** 23–27	4–6	Rubber Bowl	3,000
11	December 7	at **Detroit Lions**	**L** 21–45	4–7	Briggs Stadium	50,410
12	December 14	Chicago Cardinals	**W** 10–7	5–7	Wrigley Field	32,578

Note: Intra-conference opponents are in bold text.

=== Game summaries ===
==== Week 1 ====
Team	1	2	3	4	Total
• Bears	3	0	7	14	24
Packers	0	7	0	7	14

- Date: September 28
- Location: City Stadium
- Game attendance: 24,656

Scoring summary
Q1	CHI	White 30 yard field goal	CHI 3–0
Q2	GB	Rote 5 yard run (Cone kick)	GB 7–3
Q3	CHI	Dottley 25 yard pass from Williams (Blanda kick)	CHI 10–3
Q4	CHI	Schroeder 16 yard pass from Williams (Blanda kick)	CHI 17–3
Q4	CHI	Dottley 44 yard run (Blanda kick)	CHI 24–3
Q4	GB	Howton 39 yard pass from Rote (Cone kick)	CHI 24–10

=== Standings ===
NFL National Conference
	W	L	T	PCT	CONF	PF	PA	STK
Detroit Lions	9	3	0	.750	7–3	344	192	W3
Los Angeles Rams	9	3	0	.750	8–2	349	234	W8
San Francisco 49ers	7	5	0	.583	6–3	285	221	W1
Green Bay Packers	6	6	0	.500	3–6	295	312	L3
Chicago Bears	5	7	0	.417	4–6	245	326	W1
Dallas Texans	1	11	0	.083	1–9	182	427	L2

Note: Tie games were not officially counted in the standings until 1972.

== Roster ==
Chicago Bears 1952 roster
Quarterbacks: 16 George Blanda K; 12 Steve Romanik; 9 Bob Williams; Running backs: 32 Leon Campbell OLB; 31 Emerson Cole; 41 Babe Dimancheff; 46 Chuck Hunsinger; 25 Eddie Macon CB; 15 Fred Morrison P; 45 Billy Stone S; 33 Wilford White K; Receivers: 83 Bill McColl; 88 Gene Schroeder S; 86 Bill Wightkin DE	Offensive linemen: 61 Dick Barwegen G; 71 George Connor T/MLB; 76 Bobby Cross T; 72 Bill George G/OLB; 51 Wayne Hansen C; 65 Bob Moser C/DT/LB; 66 Bulldog Turner T/C; Defensive linemen: 73 Bill Bishop DT; 74 Herman Clark MG; 82 Jack Hoffman DE; 7 Ed Sprinkle DE/WR; 75 Fred Williams DT	Linebackers: 67 Ed Bradley OLB; 40 Al Campana OLB/RB; 62 Frank Dempsey OLB/G; 89 John Hoffman OLB/WR; Defensive backs: 43 Jim Dooley CB/RB; 6 Don Kindt CB; 84 Bones Weatherly S	Reserve list: 34 Kayo Dottley RB (IR); 39 George Gulyanics CB (Retired); 49 Jimmy Lesane RB (Military); -- Brad Rowland RB (Military); Rookies in italics
