= Pat Harder =

American football player and official (1922–1992)

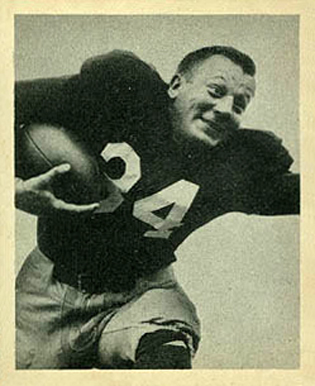
- Harder on a 1948 Bowman card

No. 34
- Positions: Fullback, linebacker

Personal information
- Born: May 6, 1922; Milwaukee, Wisconsin, U.S.
- Died: September 6, 1992 (aged 70); Waukesha, Wisconsin, U.S.
- Listed height: 5 ft 11 in (1.80 m)
- Listed weight: 203 lb (92 kg)

Career information
- High school: Washington (Milwaukee)
- College: Wisconsin (1940-1942)
- NFL draft: 1944: 1st round, 2nd overall pick

Career history
- Chicago Cardinals (1946–1950); Detroit Lions (1951–1953)

Awards and highlights
- 3× NFL champion (1947, 1952, 1953); UPI MVP (1947); 3× First-team All-Pro (1947–1949); 3× Second-team All-Pro (1946, 1950, 1952); 2× Pro Bowl (1950, 1952); 3× NFL scoring leader (1947–1949); NFL 1940s All-Decade Team; First-team All-American (1942); 2× First-team All-Big Ten (1941, 1942)

Career NFL statistics
- Rushing yards: 3,016
- Rushing average: 4.1
- Rushing touchdowns: 33
- Receptions: 92
- Receiving yards: 864
- Receiving touchdowns: 5
- Stats at Pro Football Reference
- College Football Hall of Fame

Marlin Martin "Pat" Harder (May 6, 1922 – September 6, 1992) was an American professional football player and official in the National Football League (NFL). He played as a fullback and kicker. Harder played college football for the Wisconsin Badgers and was inducted into the College Football Hall of Fame in 1993.

== Early life ==
After graduating from Washington High School, in Milwaukee, he enrolled in the University of Wisconsin–Madison. Playing fullback for the Badgers, Harder led the Big Ten Conference in rushing and scoring in 1941. In 1942, Harder was part of a team that went 8–1–1, including a 17–7 victory over the reigning national champion Ohio State Buckeyes, in which Harder scored 11 of the 17 points. Harder left Wisconsin to join the United States Marine Corps in 1943 to fight in World War II. Despite having a year of eligibility left when he left the Marines, Harder turned pro in 1946.

== Professional career ==
Harder was selected second overall in the 1944 NFL draft by the Chicago (now Arizona) Cardinals. Harder was part of the Cardinals' "Million Dollar Backfield" which also included quarterback Paul Christman and halfbacks Marshall Goldberg and Charley Trippi. He was the first player in league history to score over 100 points in three consecutive years, which he did from 1947 to 1949, leading the league all three years. In 1947, the Cardinals won the NFL Championship (the Cardinals' last as of 2025). In the championship game, Harder kicked four extra points to help defeat the Philadelphia Eagles, 28–21.

Harder was traded to the Detroit Lions in 1951. He helped the Lions win back-to-back NFL Championships in 1952 and 1953; in the two games of 1952, he was sent to kick three field goals and six extra points. He made all but one field goal. In the National Conference playoff game on December 21, he was both fullback and kicker. He scored two touchdown runs to start the first half and kicked the extra point on those runs and two touchdowns scored by his teammates to go with a field goal for a total of 19 points in the 31–21 victory. This set a new record for points scored by any player in a playoff game that was not surpassed until 1994.

Harder retired from professional football in 1953. Despite his late start, he was named as one of the three fullbacks to the National Football League 1940s All-Decade Team.

== NFL career statistics ==
Legend
| | Won the NFL championship |
| | Led the league |
| **Bold** | Career high |

=== Regular season ===
| Year | Team | Games | | Rushing | | | | | Receiving | | | | |
| Year | Team | GP | GS | Att | Yds | Avg | Lng | TD | Rec | Yds | Avg | Lng | TD |
|---|---|---|---|---|---|---|---|---|---|---|---|---|---|
| 1946 | CRD | 11 | 6 | 106 | 545 | **5.1** | 55 | 4 | 11 | 128 | 11.6 | 24 | 1 |
| 1947 | CRD | 12 | 7 | 113 | 371 | 3.3 | 45 | **7** | 9 | 78 | 8.7 | 21 | 0 |
| 1948 | CRD | 12 | 7 | **126** | **554** | 4.4 | **71** | 6 | 13 | 93 | 7.2 | 26 | 0 |
| 1949 | CRD | 11 | 9 | 106 | 447 | 4.2 | 42 | **7** | 12 | 100 | 8.3 | **44** | 1 |
| 1950 | CRD | 12 | 12 | 99 | 454 | 4.6 | 22 | 1 | 15 | 111 | 7.4 | 35 | 0 |
| 1951 | DET | 12 | 11 | 101 | 380 | 3.8 | 28 | 6 | **17** | **193** | 11.4 | 26 | **2** |
| 1952 | DET | 11 | 8 | 81 | 244 | 3.0 | 22 | 2 | 14 | 142 | 10.1 | 22 | 1 |
| 1953 | DET | 5 | 1 | 8 | 21 | 2.6 | 10 | 0 | 1 | 19 | **19.0** | 19 | 0 |
| Career | | 86 | 61 | 740 | 3,016 | 4.1 | 71 | 33 | 92 | 864 | 9.4 | 44 | 5 |

=== Playoffs ===
| Year | Team | Games | | Rushing | | | | | Receiving | | | | |
| Year | Team | GP | GS | Att | Yds | Avg | Lng | TD | Rec | Yds | Avg | Lng | TD |
|---|---|---|---|---|---|---|---|---|---|---|---|---|---|
| 1947 | CRD | 1 | 0 | 10 | 37 | 3.7 | - | 0 | 0 | 0 | 0.0 | 0 | 0 |
| 1948 | CRD | 1 | 1 | 11 | 30 | 2.7 | 5 | 0 | 0 | 0 | 0.0 | 0 | 0 |
| 1952 | DET | 2 | 2 | **16** | **100** | **6.3** | **20** | **2** | **3** | **24** | **8.0** | **11** | 0 |
| Career | | 4 | 3 | 37 | 167 | 4.5 | 20 | 2 | 3 | 24 | 8.0 | 11 | 0 |

== After retirement ==
Harder served as an NFL official from 1966 to 1982, working as the umpire on the crew of legendary referee Jim Tunney wearing uniform number 36 from 1966 through 1969, then number 88 from 1970 through 1978, and again in 1982. From 1979 to 1981, Harder wore uniform number 8, as officials during those seasons were numbered by position, rather than as an entire group.

The most famous game he worked came on December 23, 1972, when the Pittsburgh Steelers won their first playoff game on Franco Harris's Immaculate Reception against the Oakland Raiders. Harder was also an alternate, as was Tunney, for the 1967 NFL Championship game, famously known as the "Ice Bowl", when the Green Bay Packers defeated the Dallas Cowboys 21–17.

He also served as vice-president of a car leasing company in Milwaukee. He died in Waukesha, Wisconsin on September 6, 1992.

Harder was posthumously inducted into the College Football Hall of Fame in 1993. In 2005, he was named to the Professional Football Researchers Association Hall of Very Good in the association's third HOVG class.

The popular chant "Hit 'em again harder, harder, harder" was a University of Wisconsin cheer aimed at Pat Harder and can still be heard at high school and college games today.
