= Bob Smith (defensive back, born 1925) =

American football player (1925–2002)

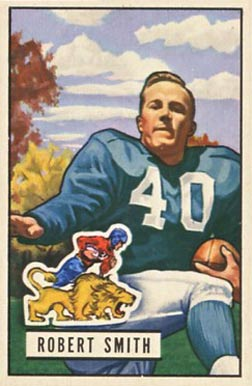
- Smith on a 1951 Bowman football card

No. 85, 62, 82, 40
- Positions: Defensive back, halfback, punter

Personal information
- Born: August 20, 1925; Ranger, Texas, U.S.
- Died: March 1, 2002 (aged 76); Flower Mound, Texas, U.S.
- Listed height: 6 ft 1 in (1.85 m)
- Listed weight: 191 lb (87 kg)

Career information
- High school: Will Rogers (Tulsa, Oklahoma)
- College: Tulsa (1943, 1945); Iowa (1946-1947)
- NFL draft: 1947: 24th round, 219th overall pick

Career history
- Buffalo Bills (1948); Brooklyn Dodgers (1948); Chicago Hornets (1949); Detroit Lions (1949–1954)

Awards and highlights
- 2× NFL champion (1952, 1953); First-team All-Pro (1953); Pro Bowl (1952)

Career NFL/AAFC statistics
- Punts: 196
- Punt yards: 8,306
- Interceptions: 33
- Total touchdowns: 3
- Stats at Pro Football Reference

James Robert Smith (August 20, 1925 – March 1, 2002) was an American professional football player who was a defensive back, halfback and punter. He played in the National Football League (NFL) for the Detroit Lions from 1949 to 1954. He played for NFL championship teams in Detroit in 1952 and 1953 and was selected as a first-team All Pro after the 1952 season. He also played in the All-America Football Conference (AAFC) for the Buffalo Bills (1948), Brooklyn Dodgers (1948), and Chicago Hornets (1949). Smith played college football for the Tulsa Golden Hurricane (1943, 1945), the Iowa Pre-Flight Seahawks (1944), and the Iowa Hawkeyes (1946–1947).

== Early life ==
Smith was born in Ranger, Texas, in 1925.

== College football ==
Smith played college football for the Iowa Pre-Flight Seahawks, Tulsa Golden Hurricane and Iowa Hawkeyes (1946–1947).

== Professional football ==
Smith was selected by the Washington Redskins in the 24th round (217th overall pick) of the 1947 NFL draft. He did not sign with the Redskins, instead opting in January 1948 to sign with the Buffalo Bills of the All-America Football Conference (AAFC), reportedly for $8,500. Smith appeared in only three games for the Bills, as he was traded by the Bills to the Brooklyn Dodgers in exchange for Al Akins. He appeared in 10 games for the Dodgers, intercepted three passes, had a 58-yard punt, the longest in the AAFC during the 1948 season.

In July 1949, Smith signed with the Chicago Hornets of the AAFC. He appeared in three games with the Hornets during their 1949 season.

Shortly before the start of the 1949 NFL season, the Detroit Lions acquired NFL rights to Smith from the Redskins. Smith signed with the Lions, left the Hornets, and appeared in all 12 games with the Lions during the 1949 season. In his first NFL season, he ranked among the league leaders with nine interceptions (fourth) and 218 interception return yards (third). On Thanksgiving Day 1949, he set an NFL record with a 102-yard return after intercepting a Sid Luckman pass in the end zone during a 28-7 loss to the Chicago Bears. Smith's interception return against the Bears remains the Lions record for longest interception return.

Smith spent the remainder of his football career with the Lions, remaining through the 1954 season and playing on NFL championship teams in 1952 and 1953. During the Lions' 1952 championship season, Smith recorded nine interceptions (third best in the NFL) and 184 interception return yards (third in the NFL). In addition to playing in the Lions' defensive backfield, he handled punting duties from 1950 to 1953. His 2,729 punting yards in 1952 ranked sixth in the NFL, and his average that year of 44.7 yards per punt was second best in the league. After the 1952 season, Smith was selected as a first-team All Pro player by the United Press and a second-team All Pro by the Associated Press. He was also invited to play in the 1953 Pro Bowl.

== Death ==
Smith died in Flower Mound, Texas, in 2002 at age 76.
