= Jim Hill (American football, born 1929) =

American football player (1929–2003)

No. 12, 48, 42
- Position: Defensive back

Personal information
- Born: July 21, 1929; Knoxville, Tennessee, U.S.
- Died: May 3, 2003 (aged 73); Maryville, Tennessee, U.S.
- Listed height: 6 ft 0 in (1.83 m)
- Listed weight: 188 lb (85 kg)

Career information
- High school: Maryville
- College: Tennessee (1947–1950)
- NFL draft: 1951: 15th round, 178th overall pick

Career history
- Detroit Lions (1951–1952); Ottawa Rough Riders (1955)*; Pittsburgh Steelers (1955)
- * Offseason or practice squad member only

Awards and highlights
- NFL champion (1952)

Career NFL statistics
- Games played: 33
- Games started: 14
- Interceptions: 2
- Fumble recoveries: 2
- Return yards: 2
- Stats at Pro Football Reference

James "Cowboy" Clifford Hill (July 21, 1929 – May 5, 2003) was an American professional football defensive back who played in the National Football League (NFL) with the Detroit Lions and Pittsburgh Steelers. He played college football for the Tennessee Volunteers. Hill also had a stint with the Ottawa Rough Riders in the Interprovincial Rugby Football Union (IRFU).

== Early life ==
Hill was born on July 21, 1929, in Knoxville, Tennessee. He attended Maryville High School in Maryville, Tennessee.

== College career ==
Hill played college football for the Tennessee Volunteers from 1947 to 1950. He was a three-year letterman from 1948 to 1950. In 1948, Hill rushed eight times for 55 yards and had one reception for seven yards. He also lettered in baseball and track.

== Professional career ==
=== Detroit Lions ===
Hill was selected in the 15th round, with the 178th overall selection, by the Detroit Lions in the 1951 NFL draft. On June 26, he signed with the team. In two seasons for the Lions, Hill had one interception, one fumble recovery and two punt return yards. On May 1, 1953, he became a free agent.

=== Ottawa Rough Riders ===
After Hill returned from service in the US Army Reserves, he was traded from the Lions to the Washington Redskins. Instead of signing with the Redskins, he opted to head north to Ottawa and signed with the Rough Riders of the Interprovincial Rugby Football Union (IRFU) on March 19, 1955. Hill was released prior to playing a game with the team.

=== Pittsburgh Steelers ===
Hill was signed by the Pittsburgh Steelers for the 1955 season and played in 12 games, starting in 11. He had one interception, one fumble recovery. On May 1, 1956, Hill became a free agent.
