= Deral Teteak =

American football player (1929–2014)

No. 66
- Positions: Guard, linebacker

Personal information
- Born: December 11, 1929; Oconto, Wisconsin, U.S.
- Died: December 18, 2014 (aged 85); Naples, Florida, U.S.
- Listed height: 5 ft 10 in (1.78 m)
- Listed weight: 210 lb (95 kg)

Career information
- High school: Oshkosh (Oshkosh, Wisconsin)
- College: Wisconsin
- NFL draft: 1952: 9th round, 100th overall pick

Career history
- Green Bay Packers (1952–1956)

Awards and highlights
- Pro Bowl (1952); Green Bay Packers Hall of Fame; First-team All-Big Ten (1951)

Career NFL statistics
- Interceptions: 6
- Fumble recoveries: 5
- Stats at Pro Football Reference

Deral Teteak (December 11, 1929 – December 18, 2014) was an American professional football player who was a guard and linebacker for the Green Bay Packers of the National Football League (NFL). He played college football for the Wisconsin Badgers. He was inducted into the Green Bay Packers Hall of Fame in 1987.

Teteak was born on December 11, 1929, the son of Miles Teteak and Aritha Hansen Teteak. He attended Oshkosh High School and the University of Wisconsin–Madison. After playing for the Packers, he worked as an assistant coach at the University of Wisconsin.

Teteak died on December 18, 2014, in a nursing home in Naples, Florida, at the age of 85. He was married for almost 60 years to his wife, Shirley. He had a son, Peter, and a daughter, Lynn.
