= Buddy Parker =

American football player and coach (1913–1982)

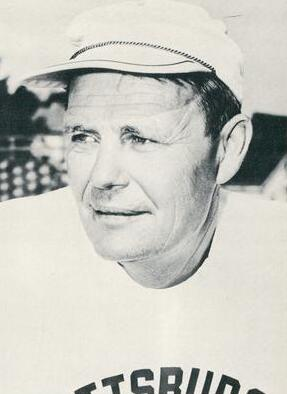

No. 4, 15
- Positions: Fullback, linebacker, defensive back

Personal information
- Born: December 16, 1913; Slaton, Texas, U.S.
- Died: March 22, 1982 (aged 68); Kaufman, Texas, U.S.
- Listed height: 6 ft 0 in (1.83 m)
- Listed weight: 193 lb (88 kg)

Career information
- High school: Kemp (TX)
- College: North Texas; Centenary

Career history

Playing
- Detroit Lions (1935–1936); Chicago Cardinals (1937–1943)

Coaching
- Chicago Cardinals (1949) Co-head coach; Detroit Lions (1951–1956) Head coach; Pittsburgh Steelers (1957–1964) Head coach

Awards and highlights
- As player: NFL champion (1935); As coach: 2× NFL champion (1952, 1953)

Career statistics
- Rushing yards: 489
- Rushing attempts: 180
- Rushing touchdowns: 4
- Stats at Pro Football Reference

Head coaching record
- Regular season: 104–75–9 (.577)
- Postseason: 3–1 (.750)
- Career: 107–76–9 (.581)
- Coaching profile at Pro Football Reference

Raymond Klein "Buddy" Parker (December 16, 1913 – March 22, 1982) was an American football player and coach in the National Football League (NFL), who served as head coach for the Chicago Cardinals, Detroit Lions, and Pittsburgh Steelers.

Parker is one of five eligible ex-NFL head coaches (along with Lou Saban, George Seifert, Tom Coughlin and Mike Shanahan) to win multiple league championships not in the Pro Football Hall of Fame. In 2023, he was a finalist as a coach/contributor for the class of 2024 but fell short of induction.

== Playing career ==
Born in Slaton, Texas, Parker grew up in Kemp, southeast of Dallas. He played collegiately for North Texas (in 1931) and for Centenary College in Louisiana for three years beginning in 1932.

Parker then signed with the Lions as a fullback in 1935, and during his first season, he helped the team capture the NFL championship. After one more year in the Motor City, he was traded to the Cardinals and spent the next seven seasons with Chicago, also seeing time on defense as a linebacker and defensive back. During the latter two years, he added the duties of backfield coach before becoming a full-time assistant in 1945.

== Coaching career ==
=== Chicago Cardinals ===
In 1947, the Cardinals captured their second (and only undisputed) NFL title, then lost in a blizzard in the following year's championship clash at Philadelphia. On February 3, 1949, Parker and Phil Handler were named co-head coaches of the Cardinals, replacing Jimmy Conzelman, who had left to work for a local advertising agency. The unique arrangement, which had Parker handling the offense and Handler the defense, quickly proved to be unworkable, and Handler was returned to the front office on October 25 with the Cardinals sporting a 2–4 record.

In the season's final six games, Parker's team won four games, but a 52–20 loss to the crosstown Bears was quickly followed by his surprise resignation on December 11. Publicly, he stated, "I'm tired of being a head coach. The duties are too demanding." Parker also reportedly was upset with his uncertain job status.

=== Detroit Lions ===
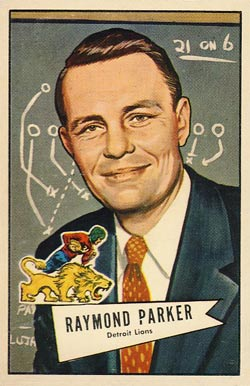
Parker on 1952 Bowman card

After first reconsidering his abrupt departure, Parker then signed as backfield coach of the Lions on January 21, 1950. However, after head coach Bo McMillin found himself in continuous battles with players during the ensuing campaign, he resigned on December 19, with Parker being promoted to the top job the following day.

Parker and quarterback Bobby Layne would popularize what became known as the two-minute offense, which allowed an offense to quicken the pace late in a game. In Parker's first year, he led the team to a 7–4–1 record, good for a second place tie in the Western Conference. It marked the start of a talent haul that would turn the team into a dominant force for much of the decade.

Parker's superstitions were legendary. None of his players wore the number 13 and always stayed at the Chicago Hilton hotel before games against either the Bears or Cardinals. That choice of lodging changed after the team was placed one year on the 13th floor and lost the game.

In 1952, the Lions defeated the Los Angeles Rams in a divisional tiebreaker playoff on December 21, then used a strong defensive effort to defeat the injury-plagued Cleveland Browns 17–7 on the road in the championship game. In 1953, the two teams again met for in the title game, with some late heroics by Layne and Jim Doran to squeeze out a 17–16 thriller in the December 27.

Putting together a 9–2–1 mark in 1954, the Lions and Browns met for the third straight year, but this time, Cleveland battered Detroit 56–10. The after-effects of the result lasted throughout the following year, when retirement and injuries plunged the Lions to a 3–9 last-place finish. Parker was able to make another run for the title in 1956, but the Lions dropped the season finale to the Bears, the key play coming when Layne was knocked out of the game with a concussion from a hit behind the play that Parker felt was both cheap and illegal. He even went as far as threatening to resign from the team in December of that year.

On July 26, 1957, Parker obtained quarterback Tobin Rote from Green Bay, a prescient move that would help the team when Layne broke his ankle and Rote then led the Lions to their third championship in six years. However, Parker was not around to enjoy the championship season after stunning the football world by resigning on August 12 during the team's preseason training camp dinner. In front of a large audience which expected him to deliver a keynote speech, Parker instead informed the audience that he was quitting. longtime assistant coach George Wilson was promoted the following day. George Plimpton wrote of this incident in his 1966 best-seller Paper Lion. In his resignation Parker cited an inability to control his players, but his struggle in obtaining a two-year contract from Lions' management also likely played a role.

=== Pittsburgh Steelers ===
After first reports had him replacing Baltimore Colts head coach Weeb Ewbank, Parker became the head coach of the Steelers on August 27, 1957, signing a five-year contract. During his first season, Parker led the team to a 6–6 mark and began making countless trades that left the team with few top draft choices over the next six years.

During the 1958 preseason, Parker attempted to get the players' attention by cutting five veterans, including Billy Wells, the team's leading rusher the previous season. He also reunited with Layne, trading for the signal caller on October 6. The price (quarterback Earl Morrall and two first round draft picks) was steep, but the immediate impact was evident: Pittsburgh improved to 7–4–1, their best record in a decade.

The next two years, the Steelers managed to compete at a .500 level, but dropped to 6–8 in 1961. The next year, the team finished second in the Eastern Conference with a 9–5 mark. During the latter year, the team challenged despite the retirement of Layne and the tragic off-season death of Eugene "Big Daddy" Lipscomb.

The aging team then began a decline that continued until the arrival of Chuck Noll in 1969. Pittsburgh finished 5–9 in 1964, and Parker signed a three-year deal on January 22, 1965, saying that the team was not that far away from a championship. He would change his mind when the team dropped its first four exhibition games, and repeated history by resigning on September 5, reportedly telling team owner Art Rooney, "I can't win with this bunch of stiffs."

== Legacy ==
Throughout his coaching career, Parker went 104–75–9 (.577), while going 3–1 in the postseason. He is one of 43 NFL coaches to have over 100 coaching regular season victories. For all coaches who started their career from 1920 to 1960, Parker was one of nine to win 100 games. As of 2026, he is one of only 26 head coaches to win two championships. The Professional Football Researchers Association named Parker to the PRFA Hall of Very Good Class of 2008.

In 2020, he was named a coaching finalist for the first time as a part of the Pro Football Hall of Fame's "Centennial Slate." He was again up for the class of 2021, but was among the coaches part of the final cut. In 2022, he was named a semifinalist by the coaches/contributors committee and was shortly named as one of the 12 finalists, the second time for Parker. He was chosen as the contributor finalist for the class of 2024; and needed 80% of the votes from the committee in a vote in January 2024 to receive induction. But on February 8, 2024, it was announced that Parker did not make it into the Hall of Fame.

== Later life ==
Parker never again coached, spending much of his remaining years in the real estate field, but he did receive job offers. In January 1966, he was under consideration for a Rams' assistant position under George Allen, then was a candidate for head coach of the Washington Redskins in December 1968. He was a special assistant under Bud Wilkinson on the 1978 St. Louis Cardinals.

In 1982, he underwent surgery for a ruptured ulcer on March 7 in Kaufman, Texas, but complications left him unconscious until his death fifteen days later.

== Head coaching record ==
Team	Year	Regular season					Postseason			
Team	Year	Won	Lost	Ties	Win %	Finish	Won	Lost	Win %	Result
CHI	1949	6	5	1	.545	3rd in NFL Western Division	-	-	-	-
CHI Total		6	5	1	.545		0	0	.000	-
DET	1951	7	4	1	.636	2nd in National Conference	-	-	-	-
DET	1952	9	3	0	.750	1st in National Conference	2	0	1.000	Won National Conference Playoff over Los Angeles Rams; Won NFL Championship over Cleveland Browns
DET	1953	10	2	0	.833	1st in Western Conference	1	0	1.000	Won NFL Championship over Cleveland Browns
DET	1954	9	2	1	.818	1st in Western Conference	0	1	.000	Lost NFL Championship to Cleveland Browns
DET	1955	3	9	0	.636	6th in Western Conference	-	-	-	-
DET	1956	9	3	0	.750	2nd in Western Conference	-	-	-	-
DET Total		47	23	2	.671		3	1	.750	
PIT	1957	6	6	0	.500	3rd in Eastern Conference	-	-	-	-
PIT	1958	7	4	1	.625	3rd in Eastern Conference	-	-	-	-
PIT	1959	6	6	0	.500	4th in Eastern Conference	-	-	-	-
PIT	1960	5	6	1	.458	5th in Eastern Conference	-	-	-	-
PIT	1961	6	8	0	.429	5th in Eastern Conference	-	-	-	-
PIT	1962	9	5	0	.643	2nd in Eastern Conference	-	-	-	-
PIT	1963	7	4	3	.636	4th in Eastern Conference	-	-	-	-
PIT	1964	5	9	0	.357	6th in Eastern Conference	-	-	-	-
PIT Total		51	47	6	.520		0	0	.000	-
Total		104	75	9	.581		3	1	.750	

== See also ==
- List of National Football League head coaches with 50 wins
