= Billy Howton =

American football player (1930–2025)

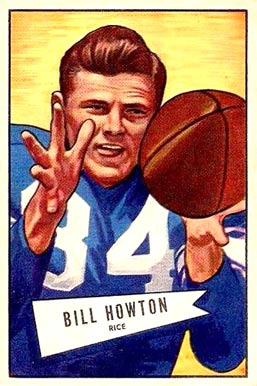
- 1952 Bowman football card

No. 86, 81
- Position: End

Personal information
- Born: July 3, 1930; Littlefield, Texas, U.S.
- Died: August 4, 2025 (aged 95); Houston, Texas, U.S.
- Listed height: 6 ft 2 in (1.88 m)
- Listed weight: 191 lb (87 kg)

Career information
- High school: Plainview (Plainview, Texas)
- College: Rice (1948–1951)
- NFL draft: 1952: 2nd round, 15th overall pick

Career history
- Green Bay Packers (1952–1958); Cleveland Browns (1959); Dallas Cowboys (1960–1963)

Awards and highlights
- 2× First-team All-Pro (1956, 1957); 4× Pro Bowl (1952, 1955–1957); 2× NFL receiving yards leader (1952, 1956); NFL receiving touchdowns leader (1956); 2× NFL yards per game leader (1952, 1956); Green Bay Packers Hall of Fame; First-team All-American (1951); First-team All-SWC (1951); Second-team All-SWC (1950)

Career NFL statistics
- Receptions: 503
- Receiving yards: 8,459
- Receiving touchdowns: 61
- Stats at Pro Football Reference

Billy Harris Howton (July 3, 1930 – August 4, 2025) was an American professional football player who was an end for 12 seasons in the National Football League (NFL) with the Green Bay Packers, Cleveland Browns, and expansion Dallas Cowboys. He was a two-time first-team All-Pro and four-time Pro Bowl selection with the Packers.

Howton played college football for the Rice Owls, earning first-team All-American honors in 1951. As an NFL rookie with Green Bay, he caught 13 touchdown passes, a rookie record that was tied but not broken until 1998. Howton caught a total 503 career passes for a total of 8,459 yards. In doing so, he surpassed then-leader Don Hutson to become the all-time leader in receptions and yardage. This made him the first receiver with 500 catches in pro football history. In over a half century since Howton's retirement, the dawn of improved passing has seen him drop into the top 50.

Despite his extensive credentials, he has yet to be named a finalist or semifinalist in Pro Football Hall of Fame balloting. He retired after the 1963 season, after four years with Dallas. In 2004, he was named to the Professional Football Researchers Association Hall of Very Good in the association's second HOVG class.

== Early life ==
Howton was born in Littlefield, Texas. He attended Plainview High School, where he lettered in football, basketball, and track and field.

Howton played college football at Rice Institute in Houston, where he was nicknamed "Red Fox" not only for his hair color, but also for the way he ran pass patterns, which made him a great offensive end, establishing a season record for average yards (22.6) on pass receptions.

At the 1948 track and field regional meet in Lubbock, he had a time of 14.3 in the high hurdle event, setting a record that stood for several decades. In 1951, he won the high hurdle event in a track meet against the Texas A&M Aggies. He was also a notable runner in the low hurdles.

In 1951, he finished his college football career with 64 catches for 1,289 yards and 12 touchdowns, on his way to earn the following honors:

- All-America.
- Southwest Conference MVP.
- All-SWC team.
- Won the George Martin Award for the second straight year (he also won it in 1950), which is given to Rice's most valuable football player.
- Played in the East–West Shrine Game.
- Played in the College All-Star Game in Chicago in August 1952.

In 1971, he was inducted into the Rice Athletic Hall of Fame.

== Professional career ==
=== Green Bay Packers ===
Howton was selected in the second round of the 1952 NFL draft, 15th overall, by the Green Bay Packers. As a rookie, he earned immediate comparisons with Hall of Famer Don Hutson, with his speed, sure hands, and big-play ability. He established himself as one of the best wide receivers in the NFL, with a league-leading 1,231 receiving yards. He also set a rookie record with 13 touchdowns, which would last until 1965 when the total number was broken by Gale Sayers. His touchdown reception mark lasted until 1998, when it was broken by Randy Moss.

Howton became one of the most successful wide receivers in Packers history, while playing seven seasons in losing teams (26–56–2). During his seven years in Green Bay, he led his teams in receiving yards for six straight seasons (1952–57), led the league in receiving yards two times (1952 and 1956) and touchdown receptions once (1956). He caught 303 passes for 5,581 yards with an 18.4 yard average, scored 43 touchdowns and earned All-Pro in two seasons (1956–57) and Pro Bowl honors in four seasons (1952 and 1955–57).

He caught 13 touchdown passes in his 1952 rookie season. In his fifth season in 1956, Howton caught seven passes for a total of 257 yards against the Los Angeles Rams.

He set team records that still stand today:

- Most receiving yards by a rookie with 1,231 yards in 1952
- Highest yardage game with 257 yards against the Los Angeles Rams in 1956.
- Two 200-plus receiving games - the only Packer receiver aside from Don Hutson, with four, to have more than one.

Howton was named the Packers' player representative and president of the NFL Players Association in 1958, and played a major role in establishing a pension fund for players, which was a debated topic with club owners at the time.

In January 1959, the Packers hired Vince Lombardi as head coach and general manager after the team's worst record ever (1–10–1) in 1958. In April, Lombardi traded Howton to the Cleveland Browns in exchange for defensive end Bill Quinlan and halfback Lew Carpenter. Lombardi desired receivers who could block, which was not Howton's strength.

Through the years, there has been speculation that his NFL Players Association ties were the real reason behind the trade.

Howton was inducted into the Green Bay Packers Hall of Fame in 1974.

=== Cleveland Browns ===
Howton played only one season in Cleveland, leading the team in receptions with 39, and experiencing what would be the only winning campaign of his NFL career. At the start of the 1960 season, he notified the Browns his intentions to retire.

The expansion Dallas Cowboys convinced him to play in his home state and traded a draft choice to the Browns in exchange for his rights.

=== Dallas Cowboys ===
Howton was acquired by the expansion Dallas Cowboys in 1960. That season the Cowboys recorded only a tie, which came against the New York Giants at Yankee Stadium on December 4, when a late touchdown pass from Eddie LeBaron to Howton finalized a 31–31 comeback, against a team that had made championship game appearances in three of the previous four years. Following the season, Howton signed a three-year contract.

The first win in franchise history came during the 1961 season opener against the Pittsburgh Steelers, 27–24, with Howton contributing a game-high 138 receiving yards and a touchdown.

During his time with the Cowboys, Howton remained a key starter in a league-leading offense, that was composed by Eddie LeBaron, Don Meredith, Don Perkins, Frank Clarke, Dick Bielski, and Lee Folkins. He led the Cowboys in receiving in 1961 (with a career-high of 56 catches) and again in 1962.

On September 29, 1963, Howton became the NFL's all-time receiving leader, after breaking Don Hutson's record for career receptions and receiving yards. He retired after the season ended.

== NFL career statistics ==
Legend
	Led the league
**Bold**	Career high

Year	Team	Games		Receiving				
Year	Team	GP	GS	Rec	Yds	Avg	Lng	TD
1952	GB	12	12	53	**1,231**	**23.2**	**90**	**13**
1953	GB	8	8	25	463	18.5	80	4
1954	GB	12	11	52	768	14.8	59	2
1955	GB	12	12	44	697	15.8	60	5
1956	GB	12	12	55	1,188	21.6	66	12
1957	GB	12	12	38	727	19.1	77	5
1958	GB	12	12	36	507	14.1	50	2
1959	CLE	12	12	39	510	13.1	36	1
1960	DAL	11	7	23	363	15.8	41	4
1961	DAL	**14**	**14**	**56**	785	14.0	53	4
1962	DAL	**14**	**14**	49	706	14.4	69	6
1963	DAL	11	7	33	514	15.6	44	3
Career		142	133	503	8,459	16.8	90	61

== Legacy ==
Howton left the league after 12 seasons with 503 catches, 8,459 yards, and 61 touchdowns. Howton was also the top receiver from those players in the 1952 NFL draft, which included future Hall of Famers such as Frank Gifford, Ollie Matson, and Hugh McElhenny. Howton was tied for fourth all-time in touchdowns with Pete Pihos. Of the six players with at least 60 receiving touchdowns in 1963, only Howton is not in the Hall of Fame. Howton has never been named a semifinalist for the Hall in a half-century since being eligible. Raymond Berry, who passed him as the all-time leader in receptions and touchdowns years after Howton retired, later stated, "I'll tell you a guy who is overlooked is Billy Howton. He was extremely professional in his pass routes. He knew what he was doing to maneuver and fake to get open. He would be effective going inside, going outside, effective going deep. He was an extremely dangerous receiver and had great technique." Other players differed in their assessment of Howton. Emlen Tunnell stated, "For my money, Howton is the toughest pass receiver to cover in the National League" while Night Train Lane stated, "Billy Howton of the Packers liked to run a post pattern but against me, he had to run it through me. He didn't like that."

In the first meeting of player representatives in December 1956, Howton was the representative present for the Packers, attending each meeting from 1956 to 1961 (one of three to attend all of those meetings) and serving as the first NFLPA President from 1958 to 1961. It was he who delivered an ultimatum to the owners in 1959 that led to the establishment of the NFL Player Retirement Plan rather than see the NFLPA deliver an antitrust suit to them. He later served as a representative of retired players at meetings and was also on the pension committee until 1970.

== Later life and legal issues ==
After his football career, Howton went into business. In 1981, he and two business partners were convicted of mail and wire fraud in federal court, for a scheme in which they defrauded $8 million in total from a number of institutions, including the University of Pittsburgh, Blue Cross of Florida, and several financial institutions. According to the prosecution, they promised to sell student loans to the institutions before investing the money in gold and then transferring it overseas. Howton was sentenced to five years in prison, of which he served two years before being released.

After his release, Howton moved to Madrid, Spain.

== Personal life and death ==
Howton had three children. He was married and divorced twice, to Sandra Bourgoin and then Sue Allen. He was later in a long-term relationship with Carmen Fanlo during his time in Spain; they were together for 30 years, until her death in 2019.

Howton died at a memory care home in Houston on August 4, 2025, at the age of 95.
