= Don Doll =

American football player and coach (1926–2010)

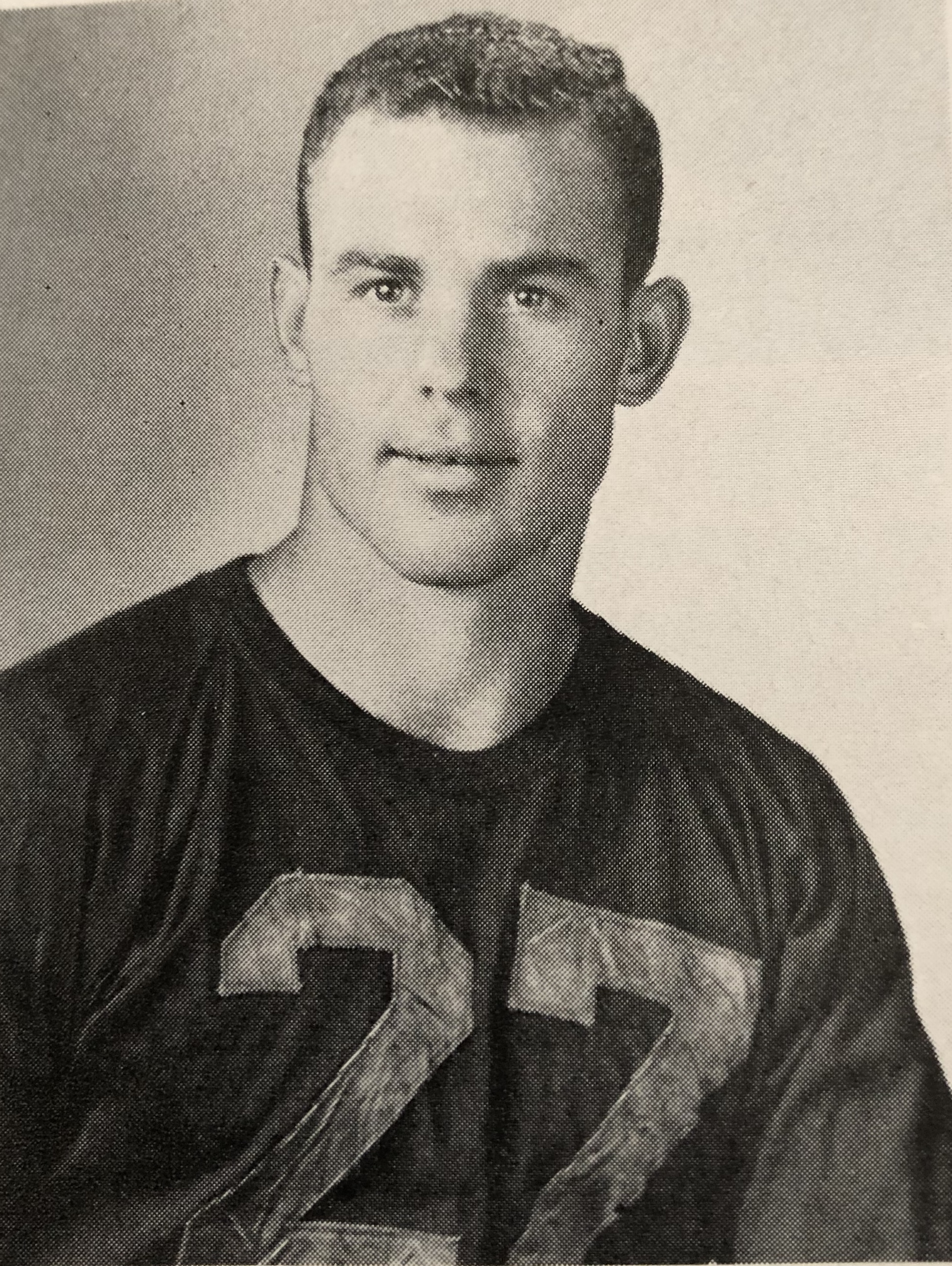
- Doll, c. 1948, from USC yearbook

No. 44, 46, 48
- Positions: Safety, return specialist

Personal information
- Born: August 29, 1926; Los Angeles, California, U.S.
- Died: September 22, 2010 (aged 84); San Juan Capistrano, California, U.S.
- Listed height: 5 ft 10 in (1.78 m)
- Listed weight: 185 lb (84 kg)

Career information
- High school: Grant Union (Sacramento, California)
- College: USC (1944, 1946–1948)
- NFL draft: 1948: 9th round, 67th overall pick

Career history

Playing
- Detroit Lions (1949–1952); Washington Redskins (1953); Los Angeles Rams (1954)

Coaching
- Washington (1955) Defensive backs coach; West Contra Costa (1956) Head coach; USC (1957–1958) Defensive backs coach; Notre Dame (1959–1962) Defensive backs coach; Detroit Lions (1963–1964) Defensive backs coach; Los Angeles Rams (1965) Defensive backs coach; Washington Redskins (1966–1970) Defensive backs coach; Green Bay Packers (1971–1973) Defensive backs coach; Baltimore Colts (1974) Defensive coordinator; Miami Dolphins (1975–1976) Linebackers coach; San Francisco 49ers (1977) Special assignments coach; Detroit Lions (1978–1985) Special teams coach; Detroit Lions (1986–1988) Tight ends coach

Awards and highlights
- NFL champion (1952); Second-team All-Pro (1951); 4× Pro Bowl (1950–1953); NFL kickoff return yards leader (1949); Detroit Lions 75th Anniversary Team; Detroit Lions All-Time Team; Third-team All-American (1947); 2× First-team All-PCC (1947, 1948); NFL record: Most interception return yards in a season by a rookie: 301

Career NFL statistics
- Interceptions: 41
- interception return yards: 617
- Total touchdowns: 3
- Stats at Pro Football Reference

Head coaching record
- Regular season: 2–7–0 (.222)
- Coaching profile at Pro Football Reference

Donald LeRoy Doll (August 29, 1926 – September 22, 2010), also known as Don Burnside, was an American professional football player and coach.

Doll played college football for the USC Trojans (1944, 1946–1948) and professionally in the National Football League (NFL) with the Detroit Lions (1949–1953), Washington Redskins (1954) and Los Angeles Rams (1955). He was selected to play in each of the first four Pro Bowls and was named the Most Valuable Player in the 1952 season Pro Bowl. He played safety on the 1952 Detroit Lions team that won the NFL championship. He tied an NFL record in 1949 with four interceptions in a single game and is the only player in NFL history to have 10 or more interceptions in each of three different seasons (1949, 1950 and 1953). When he retired at the end of the 1954 season, he was 2nd in the all-time list with 41 interceptions.

After retiring as a player, Doll worked as a football coach for 34 years, serving as the head coach at West Contra Costa Junior College in 1956 and as an assistant coach with the University of Washington (1955), USC (1957–1958), Notre Dame (1959–1962), Detroit Lions (1963–1964), Los Angeles Rams (1965), Washington Redskins (1966–1970), Green Bay Packers (1971–1973), Baltimore Colts (1974), Miami Dolphins (1975–1976), San Francisco 49ers (1977) and Detroit Lions (1978–1988). During his NFL career, he was associated with the game's legendary coaches, as a player for Curly Lambeau and an assistant coach under Vince Lombardi and Don Shula.

== Early life ==
Doll attended Grant Union High School in Sacramento, California, where he was an all-league quarterback. Doll was also named Cal-Hi Sports State Player of the Year for football in 1943. He is one of only four Sacramento-area players to earn the honor.

== USC and military service ==
Doll played halfback (both offensive and defensive) at the University of Southern California from 1944 to 1948, though he did not play in 1945 while serving in the military. He led the Trojans in rushing three times—in 1944, 1947 and 1948. He also led the team in receptions and scoring in 1948.

=== 1944 season ===
In July 1944, he joined the Trojans as a 17-year-old freshman halfback. He played the 1944 season under his birth name, Don Burnside. In the 1944 season opener against UCLA, Doll had an immediate impact. He played halfback on both offense and defense (the norm in 1944), intercepting a Bob Waterfield pass and returning it 16 yards to the UCLA 22-yard line. On the next play, the Trojans again gave the ball to Doll who ran 20 yards to the 2-yard line. Two plays later, Doll scored on a 1-yard run to give USC a 13–0 lead at halftime.

After the season opener, USC coach Jeff Cravath announced that Doll was being switched to the quarterback position for the second game of the season. Despite the experiment, Doll played principally at halfback during the 1944 season. Prior to the final regular season game (a re-match against UCLA), Al Wolf of the Los Angeles Times called him "S.C.'s 18-year-old freshman whiz."

The 1944 Trojans finished the season undefeated with an 8–0–2 record and defeated Tennessee 25–0 in the 1945 Rose Bowl. Doll played 43 minutes in the Rose Bowl and was the game's leading rusher. Los Angeles Times sports writer Braven Dyer wrote that Doll "shouldered the ball carrying burden almost single handedly" in the Rose Bowl.

=== U.S. Marine Corps ===
After playing in the Rose Bowl game, Doll was inducted into the United States Marine Corps. He served aboard the battleship USS Missouri and was an eyewitness to the Japanese surrender ceremony on the ship's deck on September 2, 1945.

=== 1946 season and name change ===
Doll was honorably discharged from the military in June 1946 and returned to USC in time for summer practice. In July 1946, Braven Dyer wrote that USC had found "a new backfield star." Dyer continued, "Fresh out of the Marines, the lad's name is Doll, Don Doll, that is." Doll had changed his surname from "Burnside" to "Doll" after being discharged from the military. Doll later explained the reasoning behind his decision:

My stepfather, Adna Doll, raised me and as soon as I was old enough (and, incidentally, had dough for the legal transfer) I changed my name to his because I was grateful for all Dad had done for me. I thought that if any honors came my way in football, I'd like to be known by his name.

However, Doll recalled that "sports writers had a field day" with his new name: "When I weaved downfield I was the 'Dancing Doll.' If I took too long on a play, I was the 'Mechanical Doll.'"

Doll played at the left halfback position for the 1946 Trojans. In the final game of the season, a 20–14 victory over Tulane in New Orleans, Doll had a key interception and return for 34 yards.

=== 1947 season ===
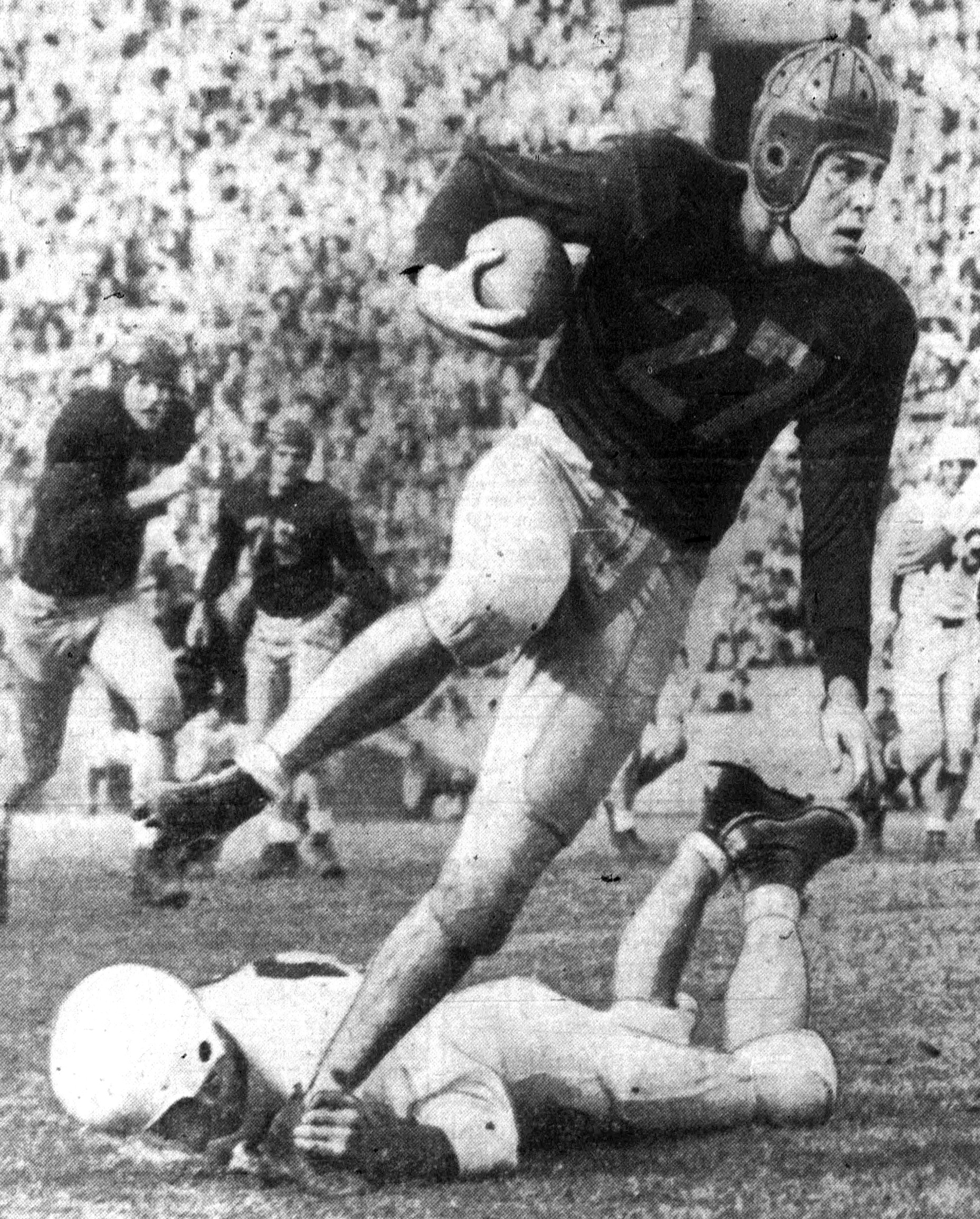
Doll during a game on November 8, 1947

In 1947, Doll added punting and punt and kickoff return duties to his role as a starting halfback. In October 1947, he was leading the Pacific Coast Conference with an average of 45 yards per punt; he was also leading the Conference with an average of 20 yards on punt returns. One of the highlights of the 1947 season for USC was a 32–0 victory in Columbus, Ohio, over a highly touted Ohio State team. Doll started the Trojans' scoring against the Buckeyes with a 42-yard touchdown run around the left end in the first quarter. Doll's longest gain of the season was a 95-yard kickoff return in a 21–0 victory over Cal.

At the end of the 1947 season, Doll was picked as a first-team back on the United Press All-Coast Conference team.

The 1947 Trojans won the Pacific Coast Conference championship and faced Michigan's famed "Mad Magicians" team in the 1948 Rose Bowl. USC lost the game 49–0, and Doll was one of the few USC players praised for his performance in the game. Sports writer Maxwell Stiles wrote, "Don Doll was a power in the secondary until he was forced out with what was reported to be a broken arm."

=== 1948 season ===
In 1948, Doll played his final season at the left halfback position for USC. He scored the Trojans' only touchdown on a 28-yard run in a 7–0 victory over Rice. The following week, Doll again scored USC's only touchdown, this time in an 8–7 loss to Oregon. He added two touchdowns in a 32–7 win over Washington.

At the end of the 1948 season, Doll was selected as a first-team halfback on the Associated Press All-Pacific Coast Team. He was also selected as the halfback and punter for the West team in the 1948 East–West Shrine Game.

== Professional football player ==
Doll was drafted by the Detroit Lions in the 9th round (67th overall pick) of the 1948 NFL draft. He signed a one-year contract with the team in February 1949. He played as a defensive back for the Lions for four years from 1949 to 1952. He was selected as an All-Pro player in his first three seasons in the NFL (1949–1951). He was also selected four times to play in the Pro Bowl (1950–1953).

At 5 feet, 11 inches, and 185 pounds, Doll was small for a professional football player. In a 1954 profile on Doll, a reporter noted, "Don, who's built like a bank clerk, piano tuner, soda jerk, errand boy or -- egad -- even a sports writer doesn't look any more like a pro gridder than your cousin Joe." Doll explained how he handled the disparity in size with the players he was required to tackle:

I just throw a shoulder into 'em and hit 'em low. If they are over two tons I aim for their shoelaces. If they're medium sized (around boxcar weight) I hit for the thighs. I'll admit I do not drive 'em back but I stop 'em where they are. ... My size is no detriment in football. I rate as the No. 1 asset the 'desire' to tackle. And I've plenty of that desire.

=== 1949 season ===
During his rookie season, Doll had 11 interceptions which he returned for 301 yards, including a 95-yard return for a touchdown against the Pittsburgh Steelers on October 8, 1949. His 301 return yards off interceptions set an NFL record that stood until 1961. His total still ranks 5th all-time in NFL history. Doll still holds the record for most interception return yards by a rookie, and it is one of the oldest remaining records in the NFL.

Doll also led the NFL in 1949 with 536 kickoff return yards. He also tied an NFL record on October 23, 1949, with four interceptions in a 24–7 win over the Chicago Cardinals.

=== 1950 season ===
In his second season in the NFL, Doll snagged 12 interceptions in 11 games, one interception short of the NFL record of 13 interceptions set by Dan Sandifer in 1948.

At the end of the 1950 season, Doll was selected as a first-team All-Pro for the second straight year and was also selected to appear in his first Pro Bowl.

=== 1951 and 1952 seasons ===
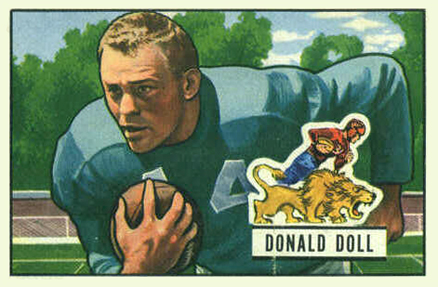
Doll on a 1951 Bowman football card

During the 1951 and 1952 seasons, Doll was selected to appear in his second and third Pro Bowls and received the George S. Halas Trophy as the Most Valuable Player in the 1952 season Pro Bowl. Doll played safety on the 1952 Detroit Lions team that won the NFL championship. Though the 1952 Lions team is remembered mostly for the offensive output of Bobby Layne, the defense included Doll and Les Bingaman and led the NFL in both scoring defense and rush defense.

In 2008, Doll was selected as a member of the Lions' 75th Season All-Time Team, recognizing him as "one of franchise's greatest players." He still holds Lions' team records for interceptions in a season (12) and interception return yards in a season (301).

=== 1953 season ===
At the start of the 1953 NFL season, Doll was traded by the Lions to the Washington Redskins, where he played under head coach Curly Lambeau. Doll totaled 10 interceptions for the 1953 season, making him the first player in NFL history to tally at least 10 interceptions in each of three seasons (11 in 1949, 12 in 1950 and 10 in 1953). Doll remains the only player in NFL history to accomplish this feat in three seasons. He was also selected for his fourth consecutive Pro Bowl. The Pro Bowl began with the 1950 NFL season, and Doll is one of the few players to have played in each of the first four Pro Bowls.

=== 1954 season ===
In January 1954, Doll was traded to the Los Angeles Rams in a three-team, multi-player deal that also sent Night Train Lane to the Chicago Cardinals. At the time of the trade, Doll, who lived at the time in San Gabriel, California, told the Los Angeles Times, "This is good news. I've wanted to play for the Rams since I got out of school." Doll concluded his playing career with the Rams and had five interceptions in 1954. When he retired at the end of the 1954 season, Doll was the NFL's all-time career leader with 41 interceptions.

== Coaching career ==
Doll retired from playing football in 1955 and worked for the next 34 years as a football coach.

In 1955, Doll was hired as an assistant coach at the University of Washington under head coach John Cherberg. Doll was put in charge of defensive backs for the Huskies. During his one year at Washington, the Huskies had the 10th best passing defense in the country, allowing only 60 yards per game in passing yards.

In 1956, Doll accepted a head coaching position at West Contra Costa Junior College.

In February 1957, Doll returned to USC as the Trojans' backfield coach under head coach Don Clark. At the time of his hiring, the Los Angeles Times called Doll "an all-time SC great" and "one of the top defensive backs in football history." Doll served as USC's backfield coach during the 1957 and 1958 seasons. He also served as an assistant on the College All-Star coaching staff in 1957 and 1958.

In February 1959, Doll was hired by Notre Dame as its backfield coach under head coach Joe Kuharich. Prior to the 1959 game between USC and Notre Dame, Braven Dyer warned in the Los Angeles Times that the man who had "mapped SC's secondary defense" was "now in the camp of the enemy." Notre Dame defeated USC in 1959 by a score of 16–6. Doll was Notre Dame's backfield coach throughout Kuharich's tenure which ended after the 1962 season.

In January 1963, Doll was hired by the Detroit Lions as their defensive backfield coach. Doll, who was then 36 years old, replaced Don Shula, who left the Lions coaching staff to become the head coach of the Baltimore Colts. Doll remained the Lions' defensive backfield coach through the 1963 and 1964 NFL seasons. At the end of the 1964 season, Doll was "swept out" of the Lions organization when team owner William Clay Ford "purged the coaching staff."

In January 1965, Doll was hired by the Los Angeles Rams as their defensive backfield coach under head coach Harland Svare. Doll remained with the Rams for only one season.

In 1966, Doll was hired as an assistant coach for the Washington Redskins under head coach Otto Graham. Doll remained with Redskins as the defensive backfield coach for five years and through three head coaches. In 1969, Vince Lombardi was hired as the Redskins' head coach. Doll served as an assistant coach under Lombardi during the 1969 NFL season, which was Lombardi's last as a coach. Doll also served under Redskins' head coach Bill Austin in 1970.

In February 1971, Doll was hired as defensive backfield coach for the Green Bay Packers under head coach Dan Devine. Doll remained with the Packers for three years from 1971 to 1973. He helped mold the Packers' backfield into what The New York Times called "one of the National Football League's stingiest pass defenses." In 1972, the Packers had the best pass defense in the NFL. In 1973, the defense lost All-Pro cornerback Willie Buchanon to a broken leg in the sixth game of the season, but still finished as the fifth best pass defense in the NFL. In January 1974, the Packers announced that Doll had resigned "because of personal problems", but it was later revealed that he was fired by Devine due to a personality conflict and disagreements over defensive strategy. On learning of Doll's departure, Willie Buchanon said, "It hurts to get news like this. Not only was he a very good coach, but he was someone who we could relate to and get along with. There aren't many people like that."

In February 1974, after undergoing hip surgery, Doll was hired by the Baltimore Colts as defensive coordinator and secondary coach. He served in Baltimore under head coaches Howard Schnellenberger (who was head coach for three games) and Joe Thomas. During the 1974 season, the Colts finished 2–12 and allowed 23.5 points per game, second worst in the NFL.

In February 1975, Doll resigned from his position with the Colts to accept a position as linebackers coach with Miami Dolphins under head coach Don Shula, who Doll had replaced in Detroit in 1963. Doll served as the Dolphins' linebackers coach during the 1975 and 1976 NFL seasons. The Dolphins finished 10–4 in 1975 and allowed 15.8 points per game, fourth best in the NFL. In 1976, the Dolphins dropped to 6–8, allowing 18.8 points per game, ranking 15th out of 28 teams. In January 1977, the Dolphins announced that they were restructuring the defensive coaching staff and would not renew Doll's contract.

In February 1977, Doll was hired as a special assignments coach with the San Francisco 49ers.

In February 1978, Doll returned to the Detroit Lions as special teams coach and film coordinator. In his second stint as an assistant coach for the Lions, Doll served 11 years from 1978 through 1988. Starting in 1986, he coached the team's tight ends. In 1988, after 10 years in one city, Doll noted, "It's kind of nice, staying in one place for a while."

== Later years, family and death ==
Doll was married in the early 1950s to Diana Davies, a graduate of UCLA. After their wedding, she became Diana Davies Doll, and Doll joked with a reporter in 1954 that he called her his "Triple-D Dynamo." Doll and his wife had five children, Steven, Wendy, Kevan, Heidi and Michael. In his later years, Doll lived with his wife in San Juan Capistrano, California.

Doll died at his home in San Juan Capistrano in September 2010 at age 84. He was survived by his wife Diana, five children, six grandchildren and one great-grandchild.

== Head coaching record ==
Year	Team	Overall	Conference	Standing	Bowl/playoffs
West Contra Costa Comets (Big Eight Conference) (1956)
1956	West Contra Costa	2–7	1–6	T–6th	
West Contra Costa:		2–7	1–6		
Total:		2–7			
