= Sonny Gandee =

American football player (1929–2013)

No. 85
- Positions: Linebacker, defensive end

Personal information
- Born: February 27, 1929; Akron, Ohio, U.S.
- Died: July 21, 2013 (aged 84); Grosse Ile, Michigan, U.S.
- Listed height: 6 ft 1 in (1.85 m)
- Listed weight: 216 lb (98 kg)

Career information
- High school: Garfield (Akron)
- College: Ohio State
- NFL draft: 1952: 9th round, 106th overall pick

Career history
- Dallas Texans (1952); Detroit Lions (1952–1956)

Awards and highlights
- 2× NFL champion (1952, 1953); Second-team All-Big Ten (1951)

Career NFL statistics
- Fumble recoveries: 11
- Interceptions: 4
- Touchdowns: 1
- Safeties: 1
- Stats at Pro Football Reference

Sherwin Kenneth "Sonny" Gandee, Sr. (February 27, 1929 – July 21, 2013) was an American professional football linebacker and defensive lineman. After playing college football for Ohio State, Gandee was selected by the Detroit Lions in 1952 NFL draft. He played for five seasons in the National Football League (NFL) for the Dallas Texans in two games during the 1952 season and for the Lions in 51 games from 1952 to 1957. He was a member of the Lions' 1952, 1953 and 1957 teams that won NFL championships.

== Early life ==
Gandee was born in 1929 in Akron, Ohio, and attended that city's Garfield High School. His father, Sherman Gandee, was a deputy sheriff in Summit County, Ohio. He had a twin brother, Sherman "Joe" Gandee, Jr.

== College football ==
Gandee attended Ohio State University and played college football as an end for the Ohio State Buckeyes football team in 1948, 1950, and 1951. He missed the 1949 season after sustaining a chipped vertebrae in his neck during a pre-season scrimmage. At the end of his senior season, he was selected to play in the 1951 East–West Shrine Game. He also played in the 1952 Senior Bowl.

== Professional football ==
Gandee was selected by the Detroit Lions in the ninth round (106th overall) of the 1952 NFL draft. He appeared in two games for the Dallas Texans and eight games for the Lions during the 1952 season. He remained with the Lions through the 1956 season and played on the club's NFL championship teams in 1952 and 1953.

== Family and later years ==
Gandee and his wife, Marilyn [Grecni] Gandee were married in 1949. they had a son and a daughter. After his first wife died in 2008, he was remarried to Jo Burgett-Amo.

After retiring from football, Gandee operated a restaurant in Wyandotte, Michigan, known as "Sonny Grandee's Celebrity House". He also worked in the automotive industry. He lived in Wyandotte for over 50 years and later lived in Gibraltar and Grosse Ile, Michigan.

Gandee died on July 21, 2013, in Grosse Ile, Michigan, at age 84.
