= Billy Stone (American football, born 1925) =

American football player (1925–2004)

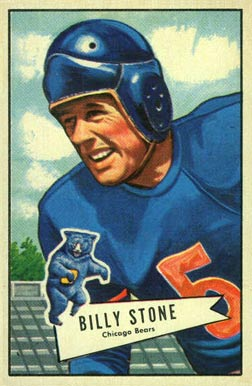
- Stone on a 1952 Bowman football card

No. 82, 5, 45
- Positions: Halfback, defensive back

Personal information
- Born: October 25, 1925; Peoria, Illinois, U.S.
- Died: May 16, 2004 (aged 78); Peoria, Illinois, U.S.
- Listed height: 6 ft 0 in (1.83 m)
- Listed weight: 191 lb (87 kg)

Career information
- High school: Lanphier (Springfield, Illinois)
- College: Bradley (1946–1948)
- NFL draft: 1949: 12th round, 120th overall pick
- Supplemental draft: 1951: 1st round, 10th overall pick

Career history

Playing
- Baltimore Colts (1949–1950); Chicago Bears (1951–1954)

Coaching
- Bradley (1955–1970) Head coach

Career NFL/AAFC statistics
- Rushing yards: 1,112
- Rushing average: 3.8
- Receptions: 143
- Receiving yards: 2,319
- Total touchdowns: 31
- Stats at Pro Football Reference

Head coaching record
- Career: 66–81–5 (.451)

William John Stone (October 25, 1925 – May 16, 2004) was an American professional football player who was a halfback and defensive back in the All-America Football Conference (AAFC) and the National Football League (NFL). He played college football for the Bradley Braves. Stone was selected by the Chicago Cardinals in the 12th round of the 1949 NFL draft. He was also chosen by the Chicago Bears in the first round of the 1951 NFL draft after the Baltimore Colts folded.

== NFL/AAFC career statistics ==
Legend
	Led the league
**Bold**	Career high

Year	Team	Games		Rushing					Receiving				
Year	Team	GP	GS	Att	Yds	Avg	Lng	TD	Rec	Yds	Avg	Lng	TD
1949	BCL	12	1	51	205	4.0	-	2	31	**621**	20.0	66	**6**
1950	BCL	8	5	14	113	**8.1**	**72**	1	12	324	**27.0**	**69**	4
1951	CHI	12	12	30	123	4.1	42	1	18	320	17.8	62	1
1952	CHI	10	10	50	196	3.9	48	2	13	283	21.8	59	2
1953	CHI	12	9	72	169	2.3	28	2	34	376	11.1	51	4
1954	CHI	12	11	**79**	**306**	3.9	23	**3**	**35**	395	11.3	42	3
Career		66	48	296	1,112	3.8	72	11	143	2,319	16.2	69	20

== Head coaching record ==
Year	Team	Overall	Conference	Standing
**Bradley Braves** (Independent) (1955–1970)
1955	Bradley	5–3–1		
1956	Bradley	7–2–1		
1957	Bradley	6–2–1		
1958	Bradley	3–4–1		
1959	Bradley	2–7		
1960	Bradley	3–7		
1961	Bradley	6–4		
1962	Bradley	4–6		
1963	Bradley	4–5		
1964	Bradley	6–4		
1965	Bradley	5–5		
1966	Bradley	6–4		
1967	Bradley	3–6–1		
1968	Bradley	4–6		
1969	Bradley	1–8		
1970	Bradley	1–8		
Bradley:		66–81–5		
Total:		65–81–5		
