= Gene Schroeder =

American football player (1929–2025)

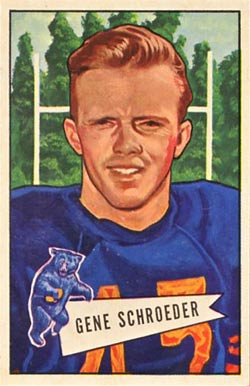
- Schroeder on a 1952 Bowman football card

No. 88
- Positions: End, defensive back

Personal information
- Born: March 3, 1929; Washington, D.C., U.S.
- Died: January 28, 2025 (aged 95); St. John, Indiana, U.S.
- Listed height: 6 ft 3 in (1.91 m)
- Listed weight: 192 lb (87 kg)

Career information
- High school: Anacostia (Washington, D.C.)
- College: Virginia
- NFL draft: 1951: 1st round, 12th overall pick

Career history
- Chicago Bears (1951–1952, 1954–1957)

Awards and highlights
- Pro Bowl (1952)

Career NFL statistics
- Receptions: 104
- Receiving yards: 1,870
- Touchdowns: 13
- Stats at Pro Football Reference

Gene Schroeder (March 3, 1929 – January 28, 2025) was an American professional football player who was a wide receiver for six seasons with the Chicago Bears of the National Football League (NFL). Schroeder played college football for the Virginia Cavaliers, and was a first-round pick in the 1951 NFL draft.https://www.pro-football-reference.com/players/M/McFaBu00.htm Schroeder moved to Crown Point, Indiana in 1975, where he retired. He died in St. John, Indiana, on January 28, 2025, at the age of 95.
