= 1952 Dallas Texans season =

NFL team season

1952 Dallas Texans (NFL) season
- Owner: Giles Miller and Connell Miller (first 7 games); NFL (last 5 games)
- Head coach: Jimmy Phelan
- Home stadium: Cotton Bowl

Results
- Record: 1–11
- Division place: 6th NFL National
- Playoffs: Did not qualify

The 1952 Dallas Texans season was the franchise's only season in the league while in Dallas after moving from New York, where they were previously known as the Yanks, and the continuation of the Boston Yanks and New York Bulldogs. The franchise continued to struggle immensely and lost their first nine games, finishing 1–11, the worst record in the 12-team league. After the season, the team became the Baltimore Colts.

After its seventh game, the franchise was returned to the NFL on November 14. The Texans' home game against the Chicago Bears was moved to Thanksgiving and to the Rubber Bowl in Akron, Ohio, and was their only victory. The final home game with the Lions was moved to Briggs Stadium in Detroit.

The NFL was unable to find a buyer for the team, and the franchise was folded. The NFL had a hole in their calendar where the Texans were originally and awarded a brand new franchise to the Colts in January of 1953. NFL says that they consider the Colts as a 1953 expansion team;it does not consider the Colts to be a continuation of the Yanks/Bulldogs/Yanks/Texans franchise. As the Colts were a new team with no players and the Texans players were available, many signed with the Colts although others signed with other NFL teams (see below) The physical assets were purchased by Carroll Rosenbloom in 1953, and became known as the Colts in Baltimore, Maryland, with Hall of Famers Gino Marchetti and Art Donovan amongst others signed with the Colts.

E Dick Wilkins went to the NY Giants, HB Bennie Aldridge finished the 1952 year in San Francisco, then went to Green Bay in 1953, DT Don Col went to Cleveland, DE Sonny Gandee went to Detroit, DE Keever Jankovich went to the Chicago Cardinals, HB Ray Pelfrey went to the NY Giants, DB Johnny Pettibon ended up in Cleveland after doing his military service and DB Will Sherman went to the Rams.

Professional football did not return to the "Big D" until 1960, with the addition of the Cowboys and the AFL's Texans (who relocated to Kansas City in 1963 and were rebranded as the Chiefs).

The Dallas Texans represent the most recent professional football team to fold.

== Regular season ==
=== Schedule ===
Game	Date	Opponent	Result	Record	Venue	Attendance	Recap	Sources
1	September 28	New York Giants	**L** 6–24	0–1	Cotton Bowl	17,499	Recap	
2	October 5	**San Francisco 49ers**	**L** 14–37	0–2	Cotton Bowl	12,566	Recap	
3	October 12	at **Chicago Bears**	**L** 20–38	0–3	Wrigley Field	35,429	Recap	
4	October 18	**Green Bay Packers**	**L** 14–24	0–4	Cotton Bowl	14,000	Recap	
5	October 26	at **San Francisco 49ers**	**L** 21–48	0–5	Kezar Stadium	26,887	Recap	
6	November 2	at **Los Angeles Rams**	**L** 20–42	0–6	Los Angeles Memorial Coliseum	30,702	Recap	
7	November 9	**Los Angeles Rams**	**L** 6–27	0–7	Cotton Bowl	10,000	Recap	
8	November 16	at **Detroit Lions**	**L** 13–43	0–8	Briggs Stadium	33,304	Recap	
9	November 23	at **Green Bay Packers**	**L** 14–42	0–9	City Stadium	16,340	Recap	
10	November 27	**Chicago Bears**	**W** 27–23	1–9	Rubber Bowl (Akron, OH)	3,000	Recap	
11	December 7	at Philadelphia Eagles	**L** 21–38	1–10	Shibe Park	18,376	Recap	
12	December 13	**Detroit Lions**	**L** 6–41	1–11	Briggs Stadium	12,252	Recap	
Note: Intra-division opponents are in **bold** text.

|} ^ game moved from Dallas

=== Standings ===
Program for the Texans' October 26 visit to Kezar Stadium to meet the 49ers.

NFL National Conference
	W	L	T	PCT	CONF	PF	PA	STK
Detroit Lions	9	3	0	.750	7–3	344	192	W3
Los Angeles Rams	9	3	0	.750	8–2	349	234	W8
San Francisco 49ers	7	5	0	.583	6–3	285	221	W1
Green Bay Packers	6	6	0	.500	3–6	295	312	L3
Chicago Bears	5	7	0	.417	4–6	245	326	W1
Dallas Texans	1	11	0	.083	1–9	182	427	L2

Note: Tie games were not officially counted in the standings until 1972.

== See also ==
- 1951 New York Yanks season
- 1953 Baltimore Colts season

== Roster ==
1952 Dallas Texans roster
Quarterbacks: 17 Bob Celeri P; 11 Frank Tripucka P; Running backs: 31 Dick Hoerner; 44 Hank Lauricella P; 20 George Taliaferro; 36 Zollie Toth; 21 Buddy Young; Receivers: 85 Ray Pelfrey; 88 Dick Wilkins	Offensive linemen: 50 Brad Ecklund C; 74 Ken Jackson T; 55 Keever Jankovich C/LB; 71 Jim Lansford T; 65 John Wozniak G; 66 Weldon Humble G/LB; Defensive linemen: 60 Sisto Averno MG; 73 Joe Campanella DT; 77 Don Colo DT; 70 Art Donovan DT; 78 Chubby Grigg MG/DT/K; 75 Gino Marchetti DE; 62 Barney Poole DE/G; 83 Art Tait DE; 79 Hamp Tanner DT	Linebackers: 35 Pat Cannamela K; 64 Keith Flowers; 65 Joe Reid; Defensive backs: 24 Billy Baggett S/RB; 21 Tom Keane S/WR; 23 John Petitbon CB; 80 Stan Williams CB/WR	Reserve list: 40 Jerry Davis S/CB (IR); 82 Dan Edwards WR (IR); -- Mike McCormack T (Military); rookies in italics
