= 1952 Los Angeles Rams season =

NFL team season

- Head coach: Hamp Pool
- Home stadium: Los Angeles Memorial Coliseum

Results
- Record: 9–3
- Division place: 2nd NFL National
- Playoffs: Lost Conference Playoff (at Lions) 21–31

Uniform
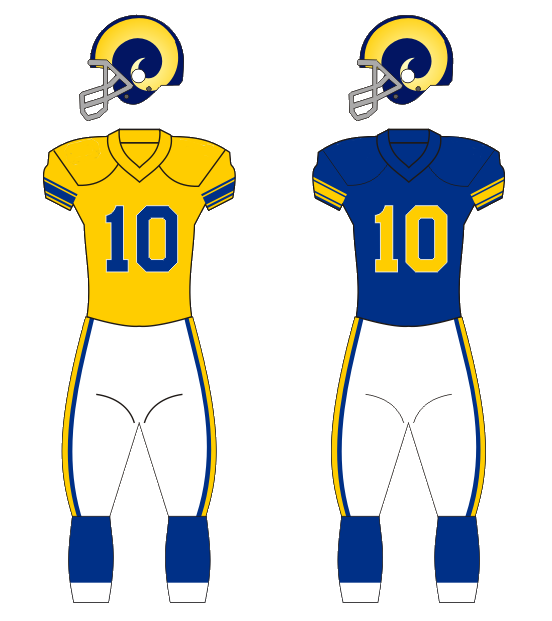

The 1952 Los Angeles Rams season was the team's 15th year with the National Football League and the seventh season in Los Angeles.

== Schedule ==
Week	Date	Opponent	Result	Record	Venue	Attendance
1	September 28	at Cleveland Browns	**L** 7–37	0–1	Cleveland Municipal Stadium	57,832
2	October 3	**Detroit Lions**	**L** 14–17	0–2	Los Angeles Memorial Coliseum	42,743
3	October 12	at **Green Bay Packers**	**W** 30–28	1–2	Marquette Stadium	21,693
4	October 19	at **Detroit Lions**	**L** 16–24	1–3	Briggs Stadium	40,152
5	October 26	**Chicago Bears**	**W** 31–7	2–3	Los Angeles Memorial Coliseum	43,574
6	November 2	**Dallas Texans**	**W** 42–20	3–3	Los Angeles Memorial Coliseum	30,702
7	November 9	at **Dallas Texans**	**W** 27–6	4–3	Cotton Bowl	10,000
8	November 16	at **Chicago Bears**	**W** 40–24	5–3	Wrigley Field	40,737
9	November 23	**San Francisco 49ers**	**W** 35–9	6–3	Los Angeles Memorial Coliseum	77,698
10	November 30	at **San Francisco 49ers**	**W** 34–21	7–3	Kezar Stadium	48,731
11	December 7	**Green Bay Packers**	**W** 45–27	8–3	Los Angeles Memorial Coliseum	49,822
12	December 14	Pittsburgh Steelers	**W** 28–14	9–3	Los Angeles Memorial Coliseum	74,130
Note: Intra-conference opponents are in **bold** text.

== Playoffs ==
Round	Date	Opponent	Result	Record	Venue	Attendance
Tiebreaker	December 21	at Detroit Lions	L 21–31	0–1	Briggs Stadium	47,645

== Standings ==
NFL National Conference
	W	L	T	PCT	CONF	PF	PA	STK
Detroit Lions	9	3	0	.750	7–3	344	192	W3
Los Angeles Rams	9	3	0	.750	8–2	349	234	W8
San Francisco 49ers	7	5	0	.583	6–3	285	221	W1
Green Bay Packers	6	6	0	.500	3–6	295	312	L3
Chicago Bears	5	7	0	.417	4–6	245	326	W1
Dallas Texans	1	11	0	.083	1–9	182	427	L2

Note: Tie games were not officially counted in the standings until 1972.

== Final roster ==
1952 Los Angeles Rams roster
Quarterbacks (QB): 7 Bob Waterfield K/P; 11 Norm Van Brocklin P; Running backs (RB): 23 Paul Barry; 31 Jack Myers LB; 21 Skeet Quinlan; 47 Vitamin Smith; 32 Dan Towler; Wide receivers (WR): 89 Bob Carey; 80 Tom Fears; 40 Elroy Hirsch; Tight ends (TE)	Offensive linemen (OL): 71 Tom Dahms T; 67 Dick Daugherty G; 63 Bill Lange G; 62 Bud McFadin G; 50 Leon McLaughlin C; 61 Duane Putnam G; 76 Don Simensen T/G; 74 Len Teeuws T/DT; 66 Harry Thompson G/DE; Defensive linemen (DL): 83 Larry Brink DE; 79 Ken Casner DT; 84 Andy Robustelli DE; 70 Charlie Toogood DT; 64 Stan West MG; 78 Jim Winkler DT/T	Linebackers (LB): 57 Don Paul; 35 Tank Younger; Defensive backs (DB): 29 Jack Dwyer CB; 88 Norb Hecker S/WR; 81 Night Train Lane CB; 20 Woodley Lewis S/RB; 42 Herb Rich S; 22 Jerry Williams CB/RB; Special teams (ST)	Reserve: -- Nick Bolkovac DT/K (Military); -- Bob Boyd WR (Military); 41 Glenn Davis RB (IR); -- John Hock G (Military); 10 Don Klosterman QB (IR); -- Les Richter LB (Military); Rookies in italics
