= 1953 Pro Bowl =

National Football League all-star game

1953 National–American Pro Bowl
American Conference	National Conference
7	27
Head coach: Paul Brown (Cleveland Browns)	Head coach: Buddy Parker (Detroit Lions)
	1	2	3	4	Total
American Conference	0	0	0	7	7
National Conference	14	0	3	10	27
- Date: January 10, 1953
- Stadium: Memorial Coliseum; Los Angeles, California
- MVP: Don Doll (Detroit Lions)
- Attendance: 34,208

TV in the United States
- Network: NBC
- Announcers: Bud Foster, Mark Scott

The 1953 Pro Bowl was the NFL's third annual all-star game which featured the league's outstanding performers from the 1952 season. The game was played on January 10, 1953, at the Los Angeles Memorial Coliseum in Los Angeles, California in front of 34,208 fans. The National Conference squad defeated the American Conference by a score of 27–7.

The National team was led by the Detroit Lions' Buddy Parker while Paul Brown of the Cleveland Browns coached the American stars. Detroit Lions defensive halfback Don Doll was named the game's outstanding player.
