= 1952 NFL Championship Game =

Coordinates: 41.506°N 81.700°W

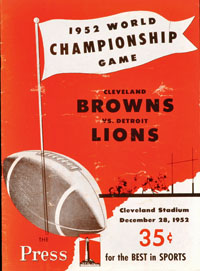
Detroit Lions (National) (9–3)	Cleveland Browns (American) (8–4)
17	7
Head coach: Buddy Parker	Head coach: Paul Brown
	1	2	3	4	Total
DET	0	7	7	3	17
CLE	0	0	7	0	7
- Date: December 28, 1952
- Stadium: Cleveland Municipal Stadium; Cleveland, Ohio
- Attendance: 50,934

TV in the United States
- Network: DuMont
- Announcers: Harry Wismer

Radio in the United States
- Network: Mutual

Location in the United States

The 1952 NFL Championship Game was the 20th annual championship game, held on December 28 at Cleveland Municipal Stadium in Cleveland, Ohio.

The Detroit Lions (9–3) were the National Conference champions and met the Cleveland Browns (8–4), champions of the American Conference. It was the first of three consecutive matchups in the title game between the Lions and Browns.

The Lions were led by quarterback Bobby Layne, running back Doak Walker, and head coach Buddy Parker, and the Browns were led by head coach Paul Brown and quarterback Otto Graham. It was the Browns' third consecutive NFL championship game appearance since joining the NFL in 1950. The Lions returned to the title game after 17 years, since their win in 1935.

The Lions finished the 1952 regular season tied with the Los Angeles Rams (9–3) for top of the National Conference. Even though the Lions won both meetings, the rules of the day called for a tiebreaker playoff game. The teams' third game was held at Briggs Stadium in Detroit on December 21, which the Lions also won, 31–21.

The Lions were 3½-point favorites in the title game, and won by ten points, 17–7, winning their first NFL title since 1935. This is one of only two road playoff game the Lions have won in their history as a franchise, with the only other one coming in 1957.

== Game summary ==
Detroit took the opening kickoff, failed to gain, and punted, with Renfro getting back 11 yards to the Browns' 41. A couple of offside penalties were costly, but the Browns still managed to reach the 18, as Graham was then tossed for an 11-yard loss and the threat ended with Lou Groza missing a field goal from the 25. Detroit then moved upfield, getting to the Cleveland 30, but also failed to score when Pat Harder was short and wide with a field goal bid from 37 yards out.

Punter Horace Gillom punted a short kick, which rolled out at midfield, with the Lions going 50 yards in seven plays. Layne started it with a pass to Cloyce Box for 10 yards to the 40 and then ran for 13 and another first down on the 27. Layne added nine more before Walker made a first down on the 16, from where Layne passed to Bill Swiacki for 14 yards to the three. After an offsides penalty, Layne would run the ball in for a touchdown and the Lions led at halftime, 7–0.

The second half started with the Browns moving steadily, until checked by David's interception. Detroit was halted on this chance with the ball, but clicked the next time when Walker broke away for the touchdown that boosted the lead to 14 points. A Cleveland third quarter touchdown narrowed the lead to 7, but a defensive stand from the Lions from their own 5 along with a late Pat Harder field goal sealed the victory and the Lions' first championship since 1935.

=== Scoring summary ===
Detroit Lions 17, Cleveland Browns 7

Quarter	1	2	3	4	Total
Lions	0	7	7	3	17
Browns	0	0	7	0	7

at Cleveland Municipal Stadium, Cleveland, Ohio

- Date: December 28, 1952
- Game time: 1 p.m. EST
- Pro-Football-Reference

Game information
- First quarter
  - no scoring
- Second quarter
  - DET – Bobby Layne 2-yard run (Pat Harder kick). Lions 7–0
- Third quarter
  - DET – Doak Walker 67-yard run (Pat Harder kick). Lions 14–0
  - CLE – Chick Jagade 7-yard run (Lou Groza kick). Lions 14–7
- Fourth quarter
  - DET – Pat Harder 36-yard field goal. Lions 17–7

== Officials ==
- Referee: Thomas Timlin
- Umpire: Samuel Wilson
- Head linesman: Charlie Berry
- Back judge: James Hamer
- Field judge: Lloyd Brazil

The NFL added the fifth official, the back judge, in 1947; the line judge arrived in 1965, and the side judge in 1978.

== Players' shares ==
The gross receipts for the game, including radio and television rights, were just over $314,000. Each player on the winning Lions team received $2,274, while Browns players made $1,712 each, the highest to date.

== See also ==
- 1952 NFL playoffs
