= 1952 Pittsburgh Steelers season =

NFL team season

- Head coach: Joe Bach
- Home stadium: Forbes Field

Results
- Record: 5–7
- Division place: 4th NFL American
- Playoffs: Did not qualify

The 1952 Pittsburgh Steelers season was the franchise's 20th in the National Football League they finished the season with a 5–7 record under head coach Joe Bach, who returned to the organization replacing John Michelosen.

The season was notable in that it was the last year the Steelers used the single-wing formation on offense, switching to the T formation the following year. The Steelers were the last NFL team to use the single-wing as their primary offensive formation.

== Regular season ==
=== Schedule ===
Week	Date	Opponent	Result	Record
1	September 28	Philadelphia Eagles	L 25–31	0–1
2	October 4	Cleveland Browns	L 20–21	0–2
3	October 12	at Philadelphia Eagles	L 21–26	0–3
4	October 19	Washington Redskins	L 24–28	0–4
5	October 26	at Chicago Cardinals	W 34–28	1–4
6	November 2	at Washington Redskins	W 24–23	2–4
7	November 9	Detroit Lions	L 6–31	2–5
8	November 16	at Cleveland Browns	L 28–29	2–6
9	November 23	Chicago Cardinals	W 17–14	3—6
10	November 30	New York Giants	W 63–7	4–6
11	December 7	at San Francisco 49ers	W 24–7	5–6
12	December 14	at Los Angeles Rams	L 14–28	5–7

=== Game summaries ===
==== Week 1 (Sunday September 28, 1952): Philadelphia Eagles ====
	1	2	3	4	Total
Eagles	14	3	7	7	31
Steelers	0	12	0	13	25

at Forbes Field, Pittsburgh, Pennsylvania

- Game time:
- Game weather:
- Game attendance: 22,501
- Referee:
- TV announcers:

Scoring drives:

- Philadelphia – Grant 84 pass from Burk (Walston kick)
- Philadelphia – Ziegler 4 pass from Burk (Walston kick)
- Pittsburgh – Finks 20 run (kick blocked)
- Philadelphia – FG Walston 32
- Pittsburgh – Modzelewski 1 run (kick blocked)
- Philadelphia – Ziegler 3 run (Walston kick)
- Pittsburgh – Finks 1 run (Kerkorian kick)
- Philadelphia – Pihos 25 pass from Burk (Walston kick)
- Pittsburgh – Mathews 27 pass from Finks (kick blocked)

==== Week 2 (Saturday October 4, 1952): Cleveland Browns ====
	1	2	3	4	Total
Browns	7	0	14	0	21
Steelers	6	7	7	0	20

at Forbes Field, Pittsburgh, Pennsylvania

- Game time:
- Game weather:
- Game attendance: 27,923
- Referee:
- TV announcers:

Scoring drives:

- Pittsburgh – Nickel 10 pass from Finks (kick failed)
- Cleveland – Motley 68 pass from Graham (Groza kick)
- Pittsburgh – Nickel 30 pass from Finks (Kerkorian kick)
- Pittsburgh – Finks 1 run (Kerkorian kick)
- Cleveland – Jones 17 pass from Graham (Groza kick)
- Cleveland – Howard 57 pass from Graham (Groza kick)

==== Week 3 (Sunday October 12, 1952): Philadelphia Eagles ====
	1	2	3	4	Total
Steelers	0	7	7	7	21
Eagles	3	10	0	13	26

at Shibe Park, Philadelphia, Pennsylvania

- Game time:
- Game weather:
- Game attendance: 18,648
- Referee:
- TV announcers:

'Scoring drives:

- Philadelphia – FG Walston 25
- Philadelphia – FG Walston 20
- Pittsburgh – Chandnois 93 kick return (Kerkorian kick)
- Philadelphia – Brewer 1 run (Walston kick)
- Pittsburgh – Mathews 25 pass from Finks (Kerkorian kick)
- Pittsburgh – Nickel 54 pass from Finks (Kerkorian kick)
- Philadelphia – Grant 17 pass from Enke (Walston kick)
- Philadelphia – FG Walston 24
- Philadelphia – FG Walston 19

==== Week 4 (Sunday October 19, 1952): Washington Redskins ====
	1	2	3	4	Total
Redskins	14	0	7	7	28
Steelers	7	10	0	7	24

at Forbes Field, Pittsburgh, Pennsylvania

- Game time:
- Game weather:
- Game attendance: 22,605
- Referee:
- TV announcers:

Scoring drives:

- Washington – Williams 62 punt return (LeBaron kick)
- Washington – Heath 1 run (LeBaron kick)
- Pittsburgh – Nickel 6 pass from Finks (Kerkorian kick)
- Pittsburgh – FG Kerkorian 36
- Pittsburgh – Hays 1 interception (Kerkorian kick)
- Washington – Taylor 11 pass from Gilmer (LeBaron kick)
- Pittsburgh – Nickel 36 pass from Finks (Kerkorian kick)
- Washington – Taylor 43 pass from LeBaron (LeBaron kick)

==== Week 5 (Sunday October 26, 1952): Chicago Cardinals ====
	1	2	3	4	Total
Steelers	0	20	7	7	34
Cardinals	0	0	7	21	28

at Comiskey Park, Chicago, Illinois

- Game time:
- Game weather:
- Game attendance: 20,395
- Referee:
- TV announcers:

Scoring drives:

- Pittsburgh – Chandnois 28 pass from Finks (Kerkorian kick)
- Pittsburgh – Mathews 70 punt return (kick blocked)
- Pittsburgh – Nickel 5 pass from Finks (Kerkorian kick)
- Pittsburgh – Sulima 13 pass from Finks (Kerkorian kick)
- Chicago Cardinals – Matson 33 pass from Panciera (Geri kick)
- Pittsburgh – Ferry 71 fumble run (Kerkorian kick)
- Chicago Cardinals – Matson 41 pass from Panciera (Geri kick)
- Chicago Cardinals – Matson 47 pass from Panciera (Geri kick)
- Chicago Cardinals – Cross 4 run (Geri kick)

==== Week 6 (Sunday November 2, 1952): Washington Redskins ====
	1	2	3	4	Total
Steelers	7	10	7	0	24
Redskins	7	0	0	16	23

at Griffith Stadium, Washington, DC

- Game time:
- Game weather:
- Game attendance: 25,866
- Referee:
- TV announcers:

Scoring Drives:

- Pittsburgh – Dodrill 35 blocked field goal return (Kerkorian kick)
- Washington – LeBaron 2 run (Rykovich kick)
- Pittsburgh – FG Kerkorian 23
- Pittsburgh – Mathews 70 punt return (Kerkorian kick)
- Pittsburgh – Rogel 1 run (Kerkorian kick)
- Washington – Safety, Finks tackled in end zone by Hennessey
- Washington – Taylor 40 pass from LeBaron (LeBaron kick)
- Washington – Justice 13 pass from LeBaron (Buksar kick)

==== Week 7 (Sunday November 9, 1952): Detroit Lions ====
	1	2	3	4	Total
Lions	3	7	7	14	31
Steelers	0	0	6	0	6

at Forbes Field, Pittsburgh, Pennsylvania

- Game time:
- Game weather:
- Game attendance: 26,170
- Referee:
- TV announcers:

Scoring drives:

- Detroit – FG Walker 16
- Detroit – Girard 1 run (Walker kick)
- Detroit – Box 46 pass from Layne (Walker kick)
- Pittsburgh – Rogel 3 run (kick failed)
- Detroit – Girard 31 run (Walker kick)
- Detroit – Bailey 9 run (Layne kick)

==== Week 8 (Sunday November 16, 1952): Cleveland Browns ====
	1	2	3	4	Total
Steelers	0	0	14	14	28
Browns	9	6	7	7	29

at Cleveland Municipal Stadium, Cleveland, Ohio

- Game time:
- Game weather:
- Game attendance: 34,973
- Referee:
- TV announcers:

Scoring drives:

- Cleveland – Lavelli 22 pass from Graham (Groza kick)
- Cleveland – Safety, Finks tackled in end zone by Young
- Cleveland – FG Groza 11
- Cleveland – FG Groza 34
- Cleveland – Lavelli 22 pass from Graham (Groza kick)
- Pittsburgh – Mathews 33 pass from Finks (Kerkorian kick)
- Pittsburgh – Butler 7 pass from Finks (Kerkorian kick)
- Cleveland – Graham 2 run (Groza kick)
- Pittsburgh – Mathews 38 pass from Finks (Kerkorian kick)
- Pittsburgh – Nickel 9 pass from Finks (Kerkorian kick)

==== Week 9 (Sunday November 23, 1952): Chicago Cardinals ====
	1	2	3	4	Total
Cardinals	0	7	0	7	14
Steelers	10	0	0	7	17

at Forbes Field, Pittsburgh, Pennsylvania

- Game time:
- Game weather:
- Game attendance: 18,330
- Referee:
- TV announcers:

Scoring drives:

- Pittsburgh – FG Kerkorian 23
- PIttsburgh – Modzelewski 6 run (Kerkorian kick)
- Chicago Cardinals – Paul 9 pass from Panciera (Geri kick)
- Pittsburgh – Finks 1 run (Kerkorian kick)
- Chicago Cardinals – Cross 38 pass from Panciera (Geri kick)

==== Week 10 (Sunday November 30, 1952): New York Giants ====
	1	2	3	4	Total
Giants	0	0	7	0	7
Steelers	14	14	7	28	63

at Forbes Field, Pittsburgh, Pennsylvania

- Game time:
- Game weather:
- Game attendance: 15,140
- Referee:
- TV announcers:

Scoring drives:

- Pittsburgh – Chandnois 91 kick return (Kerkorian kick)
- Pittsburgh – Chandnois 5 run (Kerkorian kick)
- Pittsburgh – Nickel 21 pass from Finks (Kerkorian kick)
- Pittsburgh – Mathews 42 pass from Finks (Kerkorian kick)
- Pittsburgh – Hensley 25 pass from Finks (Kerkorian kick)
- New York Giants – Stribling 55 lateral from Scott after 15 pass from Landry (Poole kick)
- Pittsburgh – Hensley 60 pass from Finks (Kerkorian kick)
- Pittsburgh – George Hays 3 run with blocked punt (Mathews kick)
- Pittsburgh – Butler 20 pass from Kerkorian (Kerkorian kick)
- Pittsburgh – Modzelewski 3 run (Kerkorian kick

Notes: Tom Landry was brought in as a 3rd string quarterback for New York to complete the game for the entire 2nd half.

==== Week 11 (Sunday December 7, 1952): San Francisco 49ers ====
	1	2	3	4	Total
Steelers	7	3	14	0	24
49ers	7	0	0	0	7

at Kezar Stadium, San Francisco, California

- Game time:
- Game weather:
- Game attendance: 13,886
- Referee:
- TV announcers:

Scoring drives:

- Pittsburgh – Rogel 3 run (Kerkorian kick)
- San Francisco – Soltau 6 pass from Albert (Soltau kick)
- Pittsburgh – FG Kerkorian 19
- Pittsburgh – Finks 1 run (Kerkorian kick)
- Pittsburgh – Chandnois 48 pass from Finks (Kerkorian kick)

==== Week 12 (Sunday December 14, 1952): Los Angeles Rams ====
	1	2	3	4	Total
Steelers	0	0	7	7	14
Rams	0	14	7	7	28

at Los Angeles Memorial Coliseum, Los Angeles, California

- Game time:
- Game weather:
- Game attendance: 71,130
- Referee:
- TV announcers:

Scoring drives:

- Los Angeles – Fears 10 pass from Van Brocklin (Waterfield kick)
- Los Angeles – Lane 42 interception return (Waterfield kick)
- Pittsburgh – Hogan 15 interception return (Kerkorian kick)
- Pittsburgh – Nickel 13 pass from Finks (Kerkorian kick)
- Los Angeles – Hirsch 65 pass from Van Brocklin (Waterfield kick)
- Los Angeles – Fears 5 pass from Van Brocklin (Waterfield kick)

== Standings ==
NFL American Conference
	W	L	T	PCT	CONF	PF	PA	STK
Cleveland Browns	8	4	0	.667	7–3	310	213	L1
Philadelphia Eagles	7	5	0	.583	6–4	252	271	L1
New York Giants	7	5	0	.583	5–4	234	231	W1
Pittsburgh Steelers	5	7	0	.417	4–5	300	273	L1
Chicago Cardinals	4	8	0	.333	3–7	172	221	L2
Washington Redskins	4	8	0	.333	4–6	240	287	W2

Note: Tie games were not officially counted in the standings until 1972.

== Roster ==
Official team photo of the 1952 Steelers squad. Note that the team had only one black player, #37 Jack Spinks.

1952 Pittsburgh Steelers roster
Quarterbacks (QB): 7 Jim Finks; 17 Gary Kerkorian K; Running backs (RB): 35 Tom Calvin; 49 Lynn Chandnois; 25 Ray Mathews; 39 Ed Modzelewski; 34 Fran Rogel; 37 Jack Spinks; Wide receivers (WR): 85 Dick Hensley; 81 Elbie Nickel; Tight ends (TE)	Offensive linemen (OL): 75 Dick Fugler T/DT; 65 George Hughes T; 66 Pete Ladygo G; 72 Earl Murray T/G; 77 John Schweder G/T/MG; 56 Bill Walsh C; Defensive linemen (DL): 82 George Hays DE; 60 Dale Dodrill MG; 78 Lou Ferry DT; 84 Bill McPeak DE; 70 Ernie Stautner DT; 50 George Tarasovic DE	Linebackers (LB): 63 Darrell Hogan MLB; 59 Lou Levanti MLB; 33 Jerry Shipkey OLB; 57 Frank Sinkovitz OLB/C; Defensive backs (DB): 27 Jim Brandt S; 80 Jack Butler CB/WR; 20 Howard Hartley CB; 24 Claude Hipps S/CB; Special teams (ST): 28 Pat Brady P	Reserve: 64 Rudy Andabaker G (Military); 14 Ed Kissell S (Military); 88 George Sulima WR (IR); Rookies in italics 31 active, 3 reserve, 0 practice squad
