= 1952 Philadelphia Eagles season =

NFL team season

- Owner: Happy Hundred
- Head coach: Jim Trimble
- Home stadium: Shibe Park

Results
- Record: 7–5
- Division place: 2nd (tied) NFL American
- Playoffs: Did not qualify

The 1952 Philadelphia Eagles season marked their 20th year in the National Football League (NFL). The team improved on their previous output of 4–8, winning seven games. The team failed to qualify for the playoffs for the third consecutive season.

== Off season ==
Head coach Wayne Millner took over, for ailing head coach Bo McMillin in 1951, would resign on September 8, 3 weeks before the 1952 season started, citing health as the reason for stepping down.

=== NFL draft ===
The 1952 NFL draft was held on January 17, 1952. Picks made by New York Yanks were assigned to the new Dallas Texans franchise. There were 12 teams picking for 32 rounds.

The Eagles made the 4th pick in each round and made 31 picks in the 32 rounds they had picks in. The New York Yanks had the Eagles pick in the 5th round.

The Los Angeles Rams received this year's lottery bonus pick. The Rams used it to pick Bill Wade a quarterback out of Vanderbilt University. The Eagles used their number-4 pick in the 1st round to take Johnny Bright a back of Drake University. Johnny Bright, was chosen before fellow backs and future NFL Pro Football Hall of Fame members Frank Gifford from University of Southern California and Hugh McElhenny out of University of Washington, passed up playing for the Eagles. Bright later commented:

I would have been their (the Eagles') first Negro player. There was a tremendous influx of Southern players into the NFL at that time, and I didn't know what kind of treatment I could expect.

=== Player selections ===
The table shows the Eagles selections and what picks they had that were traded away and the team that ended up with that pick. It is possible the Eagles' pick ended up with this team via another team that the Eagles made a trade with. Not shown are acquired picks that the Eagles traded away.

= Pro Bowler	= Hall of Famer	=Canadian Football Hall of Famer

Rd	Pick	Player	Position	School	Rd	Pick	Player	Position	School
1	5	Johnny Bright	Back	Drake	2	17	Jim Weatherall	Tackle	Oklahoma
3	29	Lum Snyder	Tackle	Georgia Tech	4	41	Chuck Ulrich	Tackle	Illinois
5	53	Pick Taken By	New York	Yanks	6	65	Dick Lemmon	Back	California
7	77	John Thomas	End	Oregon State	8	89	Wayne Robinson	Center	Minnesota
9	101	Maury Nipp	Guard	Loyola (CA)	10	113	Gerry McGinley	Guard	Pennsylvania
11	125	Ralph Goldston	Back	Youngstown State	12	137	Jack Blount	Tackle	Mississippi State
13	149	Ed Hamilton	Back	Kentucky	14	161	Bob Stringer	Back	Tulsa
15	173	Malcolm Schmidt	End	Iowa State	16	185	Jim Brewer	Guard	North Texas State
17	197	John Weigle	End	Oklahoma State	18	209	Ed Romanowski	Back	Scranton
19	221	Talbott Trammell	End	Washington & Lee	20	233	Bob Blaik	Back	Army/Colorado College
21	245	Les Wheeler	Guard	Abilene Christian	22	257	Johnny Turco	Back	Holy Cross
23	269	Maury Schnell	Back	Iowa State	24	281	Joe Tyrrell	Guard	Temple
25	293	Bob Kelley	Center	West Texas State	26	305	Bob Albert	Back	Bucknell
27	317	Chuck Hill	Back	New Mexico	28	329	Johnny Brewer	Back	Louisville
29	341	Tony "Zippy" Morocco	Back	Georgia	30	353	Don Stevens	Back	Illinois

== Regular season ==
=== Schedule ===
Game	Date	Opponent	Result	Record	Venue	Attendance	Recap	Sources
1	September 28	at **Pittsburgh Steelers**	**W** 31–25	1–0	Forbes Field	22,501	Recap	
2	October 4	**New York Giants**	**L** 7–31	1–1	Shibe Park	22,112	Recap	
3	October 12	**Pittsburgh Steelers**	**W** 26–21	2–1	Shibe Park	18,648	Recap	
4	October 19	**Cleveland Browns**	**L** 7–49	2–2	Shibe Park	27,874	Recap	
5	October 26	at **New York Giants**	**W** 14–10	3–2	Polo Grounds	21,458	Recap	
6	November 2	at Green Bay Packers	**L** 10–12	3–3	Marquette Stadium	10,149	Recap	
7	November 9	**Washington Redskins**	**W** 38–20	4–3	Shibe Park	16,932	Recap	
8	November 16	**Chicago Cardinals**	**W** 10–7	5–3	Shibe Park	18,908	Recap	
9	November 23	at **Cleveland Browns**	**W** 28–20	6–3	Cleveland Municipal Stadium	34,973	Recap	
10	November 30	at **Chicago Cardinals**	**L** 22–28	6–4	Comiskey Park	13,577	Recap	
11	December 7	Dallas Texans	**W** 38–21	7–4	Shibe Park	18,376	Recap	
12	December 14	at **Washington Redskins**	**L** 21–27	7–5	Griffith Stadium	22,468	Recap	
Note: Intra-division opponents are in **bold** text.

== Game recaps ==
=== Week 1: at the Pittsburgh Steelers ===
Week 1: Philadelphia Eagles 31 (1–0–0) at Pittsburgh Steelers 25 (0–1–0) – Game summary

Quarter	1	2	3	4	Total
Philadelphia Eagles	14	3	7	7	31
Pittsburgh Steelers	0	12	0	13	25

at Forbes Field in Pittsburgh, Pennsylvania

- Date: September 28, 1952
- Game time: EST
- Game attendance: 22,501
- Recap and Stats

Game information

1st

- Eagles Bud Grant 84-yard pass from Adrian Burk (Bobby Walston kick) Phila 7 – Pitt 0
- Eagles Frank Ziegler 4-yard pass from Adrian Burk (Bobby Walston kick) Phila 14 – Pitt 0

2nd

- Steelers Jim Finks 20-yard rush (kick failed) Phila 14 – Pitt 6
- Eagles Bobby Walston 32-yard field goal Phila 17 – Pitt 6
- Steelers Ed Modzelewski 1-yard rush (kick failed) Phila 17 – Pitt 12

3rd

- Eagles Frank Ziegler 3-yard rush (Bobby Walston kick) Phila 24 – Pitt 12

4th

- Steelers Jim Finks 1-yard rush (Gary Kerkorian kick) Phila 24 – Pitt 19
- Eagles Pete Pihos 25-yard pass from Adrian Burk (Bobby Walston kick) Phila 31 – Pitt 19
- Steelers Ray Mathews 27-yard pass from Jim Finks (kick failed) Phila 31 – Pitt 25

=== Week 2: vs New York Giants ===
Week 2: New York Giants 31 (2–0–0) vs Philadelphia Eagles 7 (1–1–0) – Game summary

Quarter	1	2	3	4	Total
New York Giants	7	14	7	3	31
Philadelphia Eagles	7	0	0	0	7

at Shibe Park in Philadelphia, Pennsylvania

- Date: October 4, 1952
- Game time: EST
- Game attendance: 22,512
- Recap and Stats

Game information

1st

- Giants Bob McChesney 18-yard pass from Frank Gifford (Ray Poole kick) Phila 7 – NY 0
- Eagles John Brewer 71-yard rush (Bobby Walston kick) Phila 7 – NY 7

2nd

- Giants Joe Scott 30-yard rush (Ray Poole kick) Phila 14 – NY 7
- Giants Bill Stribling 20-yard pass from Charlie Conerly (Ray Poole kick) Phila 21 – NY 7

3rd

- Giants Joe Scott 10-yard rush (Ray Poole kick) Phila 28 – NY 7

4th

- Giants Ray Poole 16-yard field goal Phila 31 – NY 7

=== Week 3: vs Pittsburgh Steelers ===
Week 2:Philadelphia Eagles 26 (2–1–0) vs Pittsburgh Steelers 21 (0–3–0) – Game summary

Quarter	1	2	3	4	Total
Pittsburgh Steelers	7	7	7	0	21
Philadelphia Eagles	3	10	0	13	26

at Shibe Park in Philadelphia, Pennsylvania

- Date: October 12, 1952
- Game time: ? pm EST
- Game attendance: 18,648
- Recap and Stats

Game information

1st

- Eagles Bobby Walston 25-yard field goal Pitt 0 – Phila 3

2nd

- Eagles Bobby Walston 20-yard field goal Pitt 0 – Phila 6
- Steelers Lynn Chandnois 93-yard kickoff return (Gary Kerkorian kick) Pitt 7 – Phila 6
- Eagles John Brewer 1-yard rush (Bobby Walston kick) Pitt 7 – Phila 13

3rd

- Steelers Ray Mathews 25-yard pass from Jim Finks (Gary Kerkorian kick) Pitt 14 – Phila 13

4th

- Steelers Elbie Nickel 54-yard pass from Jim Finks (Gary Kerkorian kick) Pitt 21 – Phila 13
- Eagles Bud Grant 17-yard pass from Fred Enke (Bobby Walston kick) Pitt 21 Phila 20
- Eagles Bobby Walston 24-yard field goal Pitt 21 – Phila 23
- Eagles Bobby Walston 19-yard field goal Pitt 21 – Phila 26

=== Week 4 vs Cleveland Browns ===
Week 4:Cleveland Browns 49 (3–1–0) at Philadelphia Eagles 7 (2–2–0) – Game summary

Quarter	1	2	3	4	Total
Cleveland Browns	14	7	21	7	49
Philadelphia Eagles	7	0	0	7	14

at Shibe Park in Philadelphia, Pennsylvania

- Date: October 19, 1952
- Game time: ? pm EST
- Game attendance: 27,874
- Recap and Stats

Game information

1st

- Browns Len Ford unknown-yard fumble return (Lou Groza kick) Cleve 7 – Phila 0
- Browns Pete Brewster 47-yard pass from Otto Graham (Lou Groza kick) Cleve 14 – Phila 0

2nd

- Browns Sherman Howard 35-yard pass from Otto Graham (Lou Groza kick) Cleve 21 – Phila 0

3rd

- Browns Dub Jones 63-yard pass from Otto Graham (Lou Groza kick) Cleve 28 – Phila 0
- Browns Mac Speedie 8-yard pass from Otto Graham (Lou Groza kick) Cleve 35 – Phila 0
- Browns Dub Jones 16-yard rush (Lou Groza kick) Cleve 42 – Phila 0

4th

- Browns Horace Gillom 11-yard pass from George Ratterman (Lou Groza kick) Cleve 49 – Phila 0
- Eagles Ralph Goldston 4-yard rush (Bobby Walston kick) Cleve 49 – Phila 7

=== Week 5 at New York Giants ===
Week 1: Philadelphia Eagles 37 (1–0–0) at New York Giants 25 (0–1–0) – Game summary

Quarter	1	2	3	4	Total
Philadelphia Eagles	0	14	0	0	14
New York Giants	3	0	7	0	10

at Polo Grounds in Upper Manhattan, New York City, New York

- Date: September 28, 1952
- Game time: ? PM EST
- Game attendance: 21,458
- Recap and Stats

Game information

1st

- Giants Ray Poole 30-yard field goal Phila 0 – NY 3

2nd

- Eagles Bibbles Bawel 52-yard punt return (Bobby Walston kick) Phila 7 – NY 3
- Eagles Bobby Walston 19-yard pass from Bobby Thomason (Bobby Walston kick) Phila 14 – NY 3

3rd

- Giants Bud Sherrod unknown-yard fumble return (Ray Poole kick) Phila 14 – NY 10

=== Week 6 at Green Bay Packers ===
Week 1: Green Bay 12 (3–3–0) vs Philadelphia Eagles 10 (3–3–0) – Game summary

Quarter	1	2	3	4	Total
Philadelphia Eagles	3	0	0	7	10
Green Bay Packers	6	0	0	6	12

at City Stadium in Green Bay, Wisconsin

- Date: November 2, 1952
- Game time: ? PM EST
- Game attendance: 10,149
- Recap and Stats

Game information

1st

- Eagles Bobby Walston 23-yard field goal Phila 3 – Green Bay 0
- Packers Breezy Reid 21-yard pass from Babe Parilli (kick failed) Phila 3 – Green Bay 6

4th

- Eagles Russ Craft 32-yard interception return (Bobby Walston kick) Phila 10 – Green Bay 6
- Packers John Martinkovic 5-yard blocked punt return (kick failed) Phila 10 – Green Bay 12

=== Week 7 vs Washington Redskins ===
Week 7:Philadelphia Eagles 38 (4–3–0) vs Washington Redskins 20 (4–3–0) – Game summary

Quarter	1	2	3	4	Total
Washington Redskins	0	7	6	7	20
Philadelphia Eagles	14	14	7	3	38

at Shibe Park in Philadelphia, Pennsylvania

- Date: November 9, 1952
- Game time: ? PM EST
- Game attendance: 16,932
- Recap and Stats

Game information

1st

- Eagles Don Stevens 56-yard punt return (Bobby Walston kick) 0 7
- Eagles Bud Grant 7-yard pass from Bobby Thomason (Bobby Walston kick) 0 14

2nd

- Redskins Johnny Williams 74-yard punt return (George Buksar kick) 7 14
- Eagles John Huzvar 1-yard rush (Bobby Walston kick) 7 21
- Eagles Mike Jarmoluk 16-yard fumble return (Bobby Walston kick) 7 28

3rd

- Eagles Bud Grant 4-yard pass from Bobby Thomason (Bobby Walston kick) 7 35
- Redskins Chuck Drazenovich 1-yard rush (kick failed) 13 35

4th

- Eagles Bobby Walston 26-yard field goal 13 38
- Redskins Hugh Taylor 55-yard pass from Harry Gilmer (George Buksar kick) 20 38

=== Week 8 vs Chicago Cardinals ===
Week 8: Philadelphia Eagles 10 (5–3–0) vs Chicago Cardinals 7 (3–5–0) – Game summary

Quarter	1	2	3	4	Total
Chicago Cardinals	0	7	0	0	7
Philadelphia Eagles	0	10	0	0	10

at Shibe Park in Philadelphia, Pennsylvania

- Date: November 16, 1952
- Game time: ? PM EST
- Game attendance: 18,406
- Recap and Stats

Game information

2nd

- Eagles Pete Pihos 12-yard fumble return (Bobby Walston kick) Chi 0 – Phila 7
- Cardinals Cliff Anderson 14-yard pass from Charlie Trippi (Joe Geri kick) Chi 7 – Phila 7
- Eagles Bobby Walston 20-yard field goal Chi 7 – Phila 10

=== Week 9 at Cleveland Browns ===
Week 9: Philadelphia Eagles 28 (4–3–0) at Cleveland Browns 20 (4–3–0) – Game summary

Quarter	1	2	3	4	Total
Philadelphia Eagles	14	0	0	14	28
Cleveland Browns	7	3	10	0	20

at Cleveland Stadium in Cleveland, Ohio

- Date: November 23, 1952
- Game time: ? PM EST
- Game attendance: 28,948
- Recap and Stats

Game information

1st

- Eagles Frank Ziegler 3-yard rush (Bobby Walston kick) Phila 7 – Cleve 0
- Eagles Bobby Walston 3-yard pass from Bobby Thomason (Bobby Walston kick)Phila 14 – Cleve 0
- Browns Mac Speedie 28-yard pass from Otto Graham (Lou Groza kick) Phila 14 – Cleve 7

2nd

- Browns Lou Groza 18-yard field goal Phila 14 – Cleve 10
- 3rd
- Browns Mac Speedie 48-yard pass from Otto Graham (Lou Groza kick) Phila 14 – Cleve 17
- Browns Lou Groza 19-yard field goal Phila 14 – Cleve 20

4th

- Eagles Ralph Goldston 2-yard rush (Bobby Walston kick) Phila 21 – Cleve 20
- Eagles Ralph Goldston 2-yard rush (Bobby Walston kick) Phila 28 – Cleve 20

=== Week 10 at Chicago Cardinals ===
Week 10:Chicago Cardinals 28 (4–6–0) vs Philadelphia Eagles 22 (6–4–0) – Game summary

Quarter	1	2	3	4	Total
Philadelphia Eagles	0	3	12	7	22
Chicago Cardinals	0	14	14	0	28

at Comiskey Park in Chicago, Illinois

- Date: November 30, 1952
- Game time: ? PM CST
- Game attendance: 13,577
- Recap and Stats

Game information

2nd

- Eagles – Bobby Walston 35-yard field goal PHIL 3 – 0
- Cardinals – Johnny Karras 4-yard pass from Charlie Trippi (Joe Geri kick) Tied 3 – 7
- Cardinals -Volney Peters 10-yard fumble return (Joe Geri kick) CHI C 3 – 14

3rd

- Eagles – Safety, Matson tackled in end zone by E. Van Buren CHI C 5 – 14
- Cardinals – Ollie Matson 13-yard rush (Joe Geri kick) CHI C 5 – 21
- Eagles – Bobby Walston 19-yard field goal CHI C 8 – 21
- Cardinals – Ollie Matson 79-yard kickoff return (Joe Geri kick) CHI C 8 – 28
- Eagles – Bobby Walston 8-yard pass from Adrian Burk (Bobby Walston kick) CHI C 15 – 28

4th

- Eagles – Bud Grant 30-yard pass from Bobby Thomason (Bobby Walston kick) CHI C 22 – 28

=== Week 11 vs Dallas Texans ===
Week 11: Philadelphia Eagles 38 (7–4–0) vs Dallas Texans 21 (0–10–0) – Game summary

Quarter	1	2	3	4	Total
Dallas Texans	0	7	0	14	21
Philadelphia Eagles	17	7	14	0	38

at Shibe Park in Philadelphia, Pennsylvania

- Date: December 7, 1952
- Game time: ? PM EST
- Game attendance: 18,376
- Recap and Stats

Game information

1st

- Eagles John Huzvar 5-yard rush (Bobby Walston kick) Dallas 0 – Phila 7
- Eagles Bud Grant 41-yard pass from Bobby Thomason (Bobby Walston kick) Dallas 0 – Phila 14
- Eagles Bobby Walston 29-yard field goal Dallas 0 – Phila 17

2nd

- Eagles Ebert Van Buren unknown-yard fumble return (Bobby Walston kick) Dallas 0 – Phila 24
- Texans Buddy Young 1-yard rush (Pat Cannamela kick) Dallas 7 – Phila 24

3rd

- Eagles Bud Grant 23-yard pass from Bobby Thomason (Bobby Walston kick) Dallas 7 – Phila 31
- Eagles Vic Sears 9-yard interception return (Bobby Walston kick) , Dallas 7 – Phila 38

4th

- Texans Stan Williams 24-yard fumble return (Pat Cannamela kick), Dallas 14 – Phila 38
- Texans Dick Wilkins 42-yard pass from Frank Tripucka (Pat Cannamela kick), Dallas 21 – Phila 38

=== Week 12 at Washington Redskins ===
Week 12: Washington Redskins 27 (4–8–0) vs Philadelphia Eagles 21 (7–5–0) – Game summary

Quarter	1	2	3	4	Total
Philadelphia Eagles	7	7	0	7	21
Washington Redskins	7	7	0	13	27

at Griffith Stadium in Washington, D.C.

- Date: December 14, 1952
- Game time: ? PM EST
- Game attendance: 22,468
- Recap and Stats

Game information

1st

- Eagles – Frank Ziegler 19-yard pass from Bobby Thomason (Bobby Walston kick)
- Redskins – Gene Brito 23-yard pass from Eddie LeBaron (George Buksar kick)

2nd

- Eagles – Al Pollard 2-yard rush (Bobby Walston kick)
- Redskins – Johnny Williams 38-yard interception return (George Buksar kick)

4th

- Eagles – Mike Jarmoluk 45-yard interception return (Bobby Walston kick)
- Redskins – Hugh Taylor 16-yard pass from Eddie LeBaron (George Buksar kick)
- Redskins – Eddie LeBaron 1-yard rush (kick failed)

=== Standings ===
NFL American Conference
	W	L	T	PCT	CONF	PF	PA	STK
Cleveland Browns	8	4	0	.667	7–3	310	213	L1
Philadelphia Eagles	7	5	0	.583	6–4	252	271	L1
New York Giants	7	5	0	.583	5–4	234	231	W1
Pittsburgh Steelers	5	7	0	.417	4–5	300	273	L1
Chicago Cardinals	4	8	0	.333	3–7	172	221	L2
Washington Redskins	4	8	0	.333	4–6	240	287	W2

Note: Tie games were not officially counted in the standings until 1972.

== Playoffs ==
With a record of 7–5, the Eagles fall one game back of Cleveland and failed to make the playoffs. The Detroit Lions and Los Angeles Rams would tie for the National Division title and had to play a Division Championship game before meeting Cleveland in the 1952 NFL Championship Game

== Roster ==
(All time List of Philadelphia Eagles players in franchise history)

= 1952 Pro Bowl	= Hall of Famer

NO.	Player	AGE	POS	GP	GS	WT	HT	YRS	College
	Jim Trimble	35	COACH	_{1952 record} 7–5–0	_{NFL-Eagles; Lifetime} 7–5–0			1st	Indiana University
81	Bibbles Bawel	22	DB	12	0	185	6–1	Rookie	Evansville
60	Chuck Bednarik+	27	LB-C	12	0	233	6–3	3	Pennsylvania
36	John Brewer	24	FB	12	0	230	6–4	Rookie	Louisville
10	Adrian Burk	25	QB	12	3	190	6–2	2	Baylor
33	Russ Craft*	33	DB-HB	12	0	178	5–9	6	Alabama
17	Fred Enke	28	QB	9	0	208	6–1	4	Arizona
53	Ken Farragut	24	C-LB	12	0	240	6–4	1	Mississippi
27	Neil Ferris	25	DB-HB	8	0	181	5–11	1	Loyola Marymount
22	Ralph Goldston	23	HB-DB	9	0	195	5–11	Rookie	Youngstown State
86	Bud Grant	25	E-DE	12	0	199	6–3	1	Minnesota
62	Bill Horrell	22	G	4	0	222	5–11	Rookie	Michigan State
38	John Huzvar	23	FB	12	0	247	6–4	Rookie	_{North Carolina State, and Pittsburgh}
78	Mike Jarmoluk	30	DT-T-MG	12	0	232	6–5	6	Temple
76	Bucko Kilroy	31	G-MG-T-DT	12	0	243	6–2	9	Temple
67	John Magee	29	G	12	0	220	5–10	4	_{La-Lafayette, and Rice}
68	Maury Nipp	22	G	10	0	219	6–0	Rookie	Loyola Marymount
89	Bob Oristaglio	28	DE-E	4	0	214	6–2		Pennsylvania
43	Jim Parmer	26	FB-HB	6	0	193	6–0	4	Oklahoma State
35	Pete Pihos+	29	E-DE	12	0	210	6–1	5	Indiana
21	Al Pollard	24	HB-FB	12	0	196	6–0	1	Army
62	Knox Ramsey	26	G	3	0	216	6–1	4	William & Mary
82	Joe Restic	25	E	3	0	180	6–2	Rookie	Villavova
52	Wayne Robinson	22	LB-C	12	0	225	6–2	Rookie	Minnesota
65	Dan Rogas	26	G-DT-T	10	0	230	6–1	1	Tulane
27	Clyde Scott	28	HB-DB	2	0	174	6–0	3	_{Arkansas, and Navy}
79	Vic Sears	34	T-DT	12	0	223	6–3	11	Oregon State
73	Lum Snyder	22	T	11	0	228	6–5	Rookie	Georgia Tech
20	Don Stevens	24	HB	11	0	176	5–9	Rookie	Illinois
44	Bob Stringer	23	LB-FB	12	0	197	6–1	Rookie	Tulsa
45	Joe Sutton	28	DB-HB	10	0	180	5–11	3	Temple
11	Bobby Thomason	24	QB	12	9	196	6–1	3	VMI
69	Joe Tyrrell	23	G	2	0	215	5–11	Rookie	Temple
31	Ebert Van Buren	28	DB-LB-FB-HB	12	0	210	6–2	1	LSU
83	Bobby Walston	24	E-HB-K	12	0	190	6–0	1	Georgia
63	Norm Willey	25	DE-G-E	12	0	224	6–2	2	Marshall
75	Frank Wydo	28	T-DT	12	12	225	6–4	5	Cornell
41	Frank Ziegler	29	HB-DB	11	0	175	5–11	3	Georgia Tech
88	Jack Zilly	31	DE-E	12	0	212	6–2	5	Notre Dame
	38 Players; Team Average	26.1		12		208.2	6–1.2	2.4	

== Postseason ==
At the end of the season, Bud Grant was offered a pay raise in his contract. He chose to play football in the CFL(Canadian Football League) instead. He had a career worthy of being named to the CFL's Hall of Fame as a player. Later on he made the Pro Football Hall of Fame as coach of the Minnesota Vikings.

== Awards and honors ==
Pro Bowl Players

- Chuck Bednarik and Pete Pihos both make the Pro Bowl 1st team.
- Russ Craft and Bucko Kilroy selected to the Pro-Bowl team as back-ups.

League leaders

- Bud Grant finishes 2nd in receptions with 56.
- Bud Grant finishes 2nd in receiving yards with 997 yds.
- Adrian Burk leads league in number of punts with 83 and 40.2 yds avg
- Bobby Walston finishes 2nd with 11 field goals made.
