= List of Pittsburgh Steelers team records =

NFL team sport records

This page details the Pittsburgh Steelers American football team and individual records ranging from most passing yards in a single season to all time coach winning percentages, since the franchise's inception on July 8, 1933.

== Individual single-season records ==
The most successful Pittsburgh Steelers players over the duration of its existence include the following. These records come from the Pittsburgh Steelers Media Guide pages 376–394.

=== Passing ===
- Most attempts: 675 Ben Roethlisberger (2018)
- Most completions: 452 Ben Roethlisberger (2018)
- Most yards: 5,129 Ben Roethlisberger (2018)
- Most touchdowns: 34 Ben Roethlisberger (2018)
- Highest passer rating: 104.1 Ben Roethlisberger (2007)
- Most touchdowns in two games: 12 Ben Roethlisberger (2014)

=== Rushing ===
- Most attempts: 390 Barry Foster (1992)
- Most yards: 1,690 Barry Foster (1992)
- Most touchdowns: 14 Franco Harris (1976)
- Most yards by rookie running back: 1,200 Najee Harris (2021)

=== Receiving ===
- Most receptions: 136 Antonio Brown (2015)
- Most receiving yards: 1,834 Antonio Brown (2015)
- Most receiving touchdowns: 15 Antonio Brown (2018)
- Longest reception: 97T (twice) JuJu Smith-Schuster (2017 & 2018)

=== Defensive ===
- Most tackles: 141 James Farrior (2003)
- Most sacks: 22.5 T. J. Watt (2021)
- Most interceptions: 11 Mel Blount (1975)
- Longest interception return: 96T Minkah Fitzpatrick (2019)
- Most safeties: 1 (multiple players)

=== Kicking ===
- Most punts: 97 Mark Royals (1994)
- Most punt yards: 3,944 Josh Miller (2000)
- Most field goals: 41 Chris Boswell (2024)
- Longest field goal: 60 Chris Boswell (2025)

=== Returning ===
==== Punt returns ====
- Most punt return yards: 656 Louis Lipps (1984)
- Most punt return touchdowns: 2 Antwaan Randle El (2003 & 2005), Louis Lipps (1985) and Ray Mathews (1952)
- Longest punt return: 90 Brady Keys (1964)

==== Kick returns ====
- Most kick return yards: 1,466 Stefan Logan (2009)
- Most kick return touchdowns: 2 Lynn Chandnois (1952)
- Longest kick return: 101 Don McCall (1969)

=== Coaching ===
- Most wins: 15 (16-game season) Bill Cowher (2004)

=== Miscellaneous ===
- Most points scored: 158 Chris Boswell (2024)

== Individual career-with-franchise records ==
The following lists Pittsburgh Steelers players who hold franchise career records in major statistical categories.

=== Passing leaders ===
- Passing yards: 64,088 Ben Roethlisberger (2004–2021), 27,989 Terry Bradshaw (1970–1983), 13,328 Kordell Stewart (1995–2002), 12,867 Neil O'Donnell (1991–1995), 10,104 Bubby Brister (1986–1992)
- Passing touchdowns: 418 Ben Roethlisberger (2004–2021), 212 Terry Bradshaw (1970–1983), 70 Kordell Stewart (1995–2002), 68 Neil O'Donnell (1991–1995), 66 Bobby Layne (1958–1962)

=== Rushing leaders ===
- Rushing yards: 11,950 Franco Harris (1972–1983), 10,571 Jerome Bettis (1996–2005), 5,378 Willie Parker (2004–2009), 5,336 Le'Veon Bell (2013–2018), 4,381 John Henry Johnson (1960–1965)
- Rushing touchdowns: 91 Franco Harris (1972–1983), 78 Jerome Bettis (1996–2005), 35 Le'Veon Bell (2013–2018), 35 Kordell Stewart (1995–2002), 32 Terry Bradshaw (1970–1983)

=== Receiving leaders ===
- Receiving touchdowns: 85 Hines Ward (1998–2011), 74 Antonio Brown (2010–2018), 63 John Stallworth (1974–1987), 51 Lynn Swann (1974–1982), 45 Heath Miller (2005–2016)
- Receiving yards: 12,083 Hines Ward (1998–2011), 11,207 Antonio Brown (2010–2018), 8,723 John Stallworth (1974–1987), 6,569 Heath Miller (2005–2016), 6,018 Louis Lipps (1984–1991)
- Receptions: 1,000 Hines Ward (1998–2011), 837 Antonio Brown (2010–2018), 592 Heath Miller (2005–2016), 537 John Stallworth (1974–1987), 358 Louis Lipps (1984-1991)

=== Defensive leaders ===
- Tackles: 740 James Farrior (2002–2011), 679 Lawrence Timmons (2007–2016), 677 Carnell Lake (1989–1998), 659 Greg Lloyd (1988–1997), 644 Rod Woodson (1987–1996), 639 Levon Kirkland (1992–2000), 583 Troy Polamalu (2003–2014), 564 James Harrison (2002–2017), 518 Ike Taylor (2003–2014), 448 Ryan Clark (2006–2013), 448 Darren Perry (1992–1998)
- Sacks: 115 T. J. Watt (2017–present), 92 Cameron Heyward (2011–present), 80.5 James Harrison (2002–2017), 78 L. C. Greenwood (1969–1981), 77.5 Joe Greene (1969–1981), 77 Jason Gildon (1994–2003), 60 Joey Porter (1999–2006), 59 Keith Willis (1981–1991), 57 LaMarr Woodley (2007–2013), 55 Dwight White (1971–1980)
- Interceptions: 57 Mel Blount (1970–1983), 52 Jack Butler (1951–1959), 51 Donnie Shell (1974–1987), 38 Rod Woodson (1987–1996), 37 Dwayne Woodruff (1979–1990), 36 Mike Wagner (1971–1980), 32 Jack Ham (1971–1982), Darren Perry (1992–1998) and Troy Polamalu (2003–2014), 28 Jack Lambert (1974–1984)

=== Kicking leaders ===
- Field goals made: 309 Gary Anderson (1982–1994), 302 Chris Boswell (2015–present), 204 Jeff Reed (2002–2010), 146 Roy Gerela (1971–1978), 124 Shaun Suisham (2010–2015)
- 50 yds+: 52 Chris Boswell (2015–present), 8 Gary Anderson (1982–1994) and Jeff Reed (2002–2010), 4 Kris Brown (1999–2001), 3 Shaun Suisham (2010–2015)

=== Returning ===
==== Punt returning ====
- Most punt return yards: 2,362 Rod Woodson (1987–1996), 1,759 Antonio Brown (2010–2018), 1,650 Antwaan Randle El (2002–2010), 1,259 Theo Bell (1976–1980), 1,212 Louis Lipps (1984–1991)
- Most punt return touchdowns: 4 Antonio Brown (2010–2018) and Antwaan Randle El (2002–2010), 3 Louis Lipps (1984–1991) and Ray Mathews (1951–1959) and 2 Rod Woodson (1987–1996)

==== Kick returning ====
- Most kick return yards: 4,894 Rod Woodson (1987–1996), 2,866 Larry Anderson (1978–1981), 2,720 Lynn Chandnois (1950–1956), 2,086 Dwight Stone (1987–1994), 1,771 Will Blackwell (1997–2001)
- Most kick return touchdowns: 3 Lynn Chandnois (1950–1956), 2 Rod Woodson (1987–1996) and Will Blackwell (1997–2001) and 13 other players have 1, the most recent being JuJu Smith-Schuster (2017–2021)

=== Coaching ===
- Wins: 193 Chuck Noll (1969–1991), 193 Mike Tomlin (2007–2025), 149 Bill Cowher (1992–2006)
- Win percentage: .628 Mike Tomlin (2007–2025), .623 Bill Cowher (1992–2006), .591 Jock Sutherland (1946–1947)
- Playoff wins: 16 Chuck Noll (1969–1991), 12 Bill Cowher (1992–2006), 8 Mike Tomlin (2007–2025)
- Most consecutive seasons .500 or above to start a career: 19 Mike Tomlin (2007–2025)

=== Miscellaneous records ===
- Most points scored: 1,343 Gary Anderson (1982–1994), 1,250 Chris Boswell (2015–present), 919 Jeff Reed (2002–2010), 731 Roy Gerela (1971–1978), 600 Franco Harris (1972–1983)
- Most games played: 249 Ben Roethlisberger (2004–2021), 228 Cameron Heyward (2011–present), 220 Mike Webster (1974–1990) 217 Hines Ward (1998–20011), 201 Donnie Shell (1974–1987), 200 Mel Blount (1970–1983), 197 Gary Anderson (1982–1994)
- Most touchdowns scored: 100 Franco Harris (1972–1983), 86 Hines Ward (1998–2011), 80 Jerome Bettis (1996–2005), 79 Antonio Brown (2010–2018), 64 John Stallworth (1974–1987)
- Most two-point conversions made: 5 Hines Ward (1998–2011), 4 Antonio Brown (2010–2018), 3 Heath Miller (2005–2015) and Charles Johnson (1994–1998), 2 JuJu Smith-Schuster (2017–2021), James Conner (2017–2020), Mewelde Moore (2008–2011) and Markus Wheaton (2013–2016)

== Team records ==
=== 1933–present ===
- Most points scored in a season: 436 Steelers (2014 season), 428 Steelers (2018 season), 423 Steelers (2015 season), 416 Steelers (1979 season) and Steelers (2020 season)
- Largest point differential in a season: 211 Steelers (1975 season), 204 Steelers (1976 season), 168 Steelers (1972 season), 161 Steelers (1978 season), 154 Steelers (1979 season)
- Largest point deficit overcome in a game: 21 (Baltimore Ravens Oct. 5 1997), 21 (Buffalo Bills Dec. 15, 1985), 21 (Chicago Cardinals Oct. 11, 1953), 18 (Cincinnati Bengals Nov. 19, 1995) and 17 (Indianapolis Colts Dec. 27 2020)
- Best W/L percentage against another team: .857 Carolina Panthers (6–1), .853 Atlanta Falcons (14–2–1), .818 Tampa Bay Buccaneers (9–2), .769 Indianapolis Colts (20–6), .750 New York Jets (18–6)

== Individuals with NFL records ==
=== Offense ===
The following are records that are held by QB Ben Roethlisberger (2004–2021):

- Most career 500-yard passing games: 4
- Most completions in a regular or postseason game: 47
- Most passing yards in a relief appearance: 379
- Most passing yards in consecutive postseason games: 970
- Most TD passes in a two-game span: 12
- Only player with consecutive games of 6+ TD passes

The following are records that are held by FB Franco Harris (1972–1984):

- Most career playoff touches: 451
- Most career playoff rushing attempts: 400

Most receptions without a TD: 86 Diontae Johnson (2019–present)

=== Defense ===
- Most INTs returned for TDs: 12 Rod Woodson (5 with Steelers, 5 with Ravens, 2 with Raiders)

=== Special teams ===
- Most FGs in a single playoff game: 6 Chris Boswell

=== Coaching ===
- Most consecutive seasons .500 or above to start an NFL career: 19 Mike Tomlin (2007–2025)
- Most consecutive Super Bowl wins: 2 (twice) Chuck Noll (1974 and 1975, 1978 and 1979) (tied with Vince Lombardi, Don Shula, Jimmy Johnson, Mike Shanahan, Bill Belichick, and Andy Reid)
- Most times winning consecutive Super Bowls: 2 Chuck Noll (1974 and 1975, 1978 and 1979)

== Team NFL records ==
=== Single-season ===
- Second most games won (2004 tied) and third most games won in a season by a franchise (1978 tied)
- Most rushing TD's since merger (33 in 1976)
- Most seasons with a player leading the NFL in sacks (3, T. J. Watt)
- Most AFC games with a 100+ yard rusher (Barry Foster, 1992)
- Highest passer rating and highest completion percentage by a rookie (Ben Roethlisberger, 2004)
- Most punt returns in a season (71 in 1976) and second most punt returns in a season (67 in 1974)
- Tied for fewest fair catches in a season (0 in 1977)
- Tied for most opponent fumbles recovered by an AFC player (Jack Lambert, 1976)
- Tied for most touchdowns after fumble recovery (Jim Bradshaw, 1964)
- Most road wins in a season, postseason included (9 games, 2005)
- One of two sixth-seeded teams (along with the Green Bay Packers) to ever win the Super Bowl (Super Bowl XL)

=== All-time ===
- Most consecutive non-losing seasons to begin coaching career (19, Mike Tomlin)
- Most consecutive games with a sack (75)
- Tied (New England Patriots) most Super Bowl wins (six)
- Most conference championship games played in [AFC] (15 – all with AFC) – The San Francisco 49ers have most appearances with 16
- Most conference championship games hosted [AFC or NFC] (8)
- Second most division titles won by any team in the history of the NFL (20 – second only to Dallas's 21) (all with AFC Central & North)
- Most post-merger regular season games won (486)
- Highest post-merger winning percentage [regular season & playoffs] (61.1%)
- Highest post-merger regular season winning percentage (61%)
- Quarterback with lowest interception percentage for a career (Neil O'Donnell)
- Most consecutive games with a touchdown reception among AFC teams (11) Buddy Dial, 1959–1960
- Most post-merger seasons leading league in fewest total yards allowed (5 tied)
- Most post-merger seasons leading league in fewest rushing yards allowed (6)
- Most seasons leading AFC in fewest passing yards allowed (6)
- Most post-merger seasons leading AFC in sacks (3)
- Player with most AFC games played, most NFL career points, most seasons with 100+ points, most FG attempts and FGs made (Gary Anderson)
- Player with most AFC interceptions and most NFL yards gained and most NFL touchdowns after interception (Rod Woodson)
