= 1952 Chicago Cardinals season =

American football team season

- Head coach: Joe Kuharich
- Home stadium: Comiskey Park

Results
- Record: 4–8
- Division place: 5th (tied) NFL American
- Playoffs: Did not qualify

The 1952 Chicago Cardinals season marked the 33rd year the team was in the National Football League (NFL). The team improved on their previous output of 3–9, winning four games and failing to qualify for the playoffs for the fourth consecutive season.

== Schedule ==
Game	Date	Opponent	Result	Record	Venue	Attendance	Recap	Sources
1	September 29	**Washington Redskins**	**L** 7–23	0–1	Comiskey Park	17,837	Recap	
2	October 5	Chicago Bears	**W** 21–10	1–1	Comiskey Park	34,697	Recap	
3	October 12	at **Washington Redskins**	**W** 17–6	2–1	Griffith Stadium	24,600	Recap	
4	October 19	at **New York Giants**	**W** 24–23	3–1	Polo Grounds	41,182	Recap	
5	October 26	**Pittsburgh Steelers**	**L** 28–34	3–2	Comiskey Park	20,395	Recap	
6	November 2	**New York Giants**	**L** 6–28	3–3	Comiskey Park	27,195	Recap	
7	November 9	at **Cleveland Browns**	**L** 13–28	3–4	Cleveland Municipal Stadium	34,097	Recap	
8	November 16	at **Philadelphia Eagles**	**L** 7–10	3–5	Shibe Park	18,908	Recap	
9	November 23	at **Pittsburgh Steelers**	**L** 14–17	3–6	Forbes Field	18,330	Recap	
10	November 30	**Philadelphia Eagles**	**W** 28–22	4–6	Comiskey Park	13,577	Recap	
11	December 7	**Cleveland Browns**	**L** 0–10	4–7	Comiskey Park	24,541	Recap	
12	December 14	at Chicago Bears	**L** 7–10	4–8	Wrigley Field	32,578	Recap	
Note: Intra-conference opponents are in **bold** text.

== Standings ==
Program for the first of two 1952 rumbles with cross-town rivals, the Chicago Bears.

NFL American Conference
	W	L	T	PCT	CONF	PF	PA	STK
Cleveland Browns	8	4	0	.667	7–3	310	213	L1
Philadelphia Eagles	7	5	0	.583	6–4	252	271	L1
New York Giants	7	5	0	.583	5–4	234	231	W1
Pittsburgh Steelers	5	7	0	.417	4–5	300	273	L1
Chicago Cardinals	4	8	0	.333	3–7	172	221	L2
Washington Redskins	4	8	0	.333	4–6	240	287	W2

Note: Tie games were not officially counted in the standings until 1972.

== Personnel ==
=== Staff / Coaches ===
1952 Chicago Cardinals staff
Front office: Principal / Majority Owner – Violet Bidwill Wolfner; General Manager – Walter Wolfner; Coaching staff: Head Coach – Joe Kuharich; Assistant Coaches: Assistant Coach - Mike Nixon; Assistant Coach - Dick Evans; Assistant Coach - Bill Daddio	Special Teams Coaches: None - N/A; Strength & Conditioning: None - N/A

=== Roster ===
Official team photo of the 1952 Chicago Cardinals.

1952 Chicago Cardinals roster
Quarterbacks (QB): 9 Don Panciera CB; 2 Charley Trippi P; Running backs (RB): 7 Elmer Angsman; 20 Billy Cross; 37 Joe Geri K/P; 44 Johnny Karras; 36 Ralph Pasquariello; 24 Emil Sitko; 40 Wally Triplett; Wide receivers (WR): 84 Cliff Anderson; 80 Don Stonesifer; Tight ends (TE)	Offensive linemen (OL): 72 Bill Fischer G; 73 Mike Mergen T; 69 Mike Sikora G/DE; 50 Jack Simmons C/LB; 68 Fred Wallner G; Defensive linemen (DL): 82 Tom Bienemann DE; 42 Bob Dove DE; 57 Jerry Groom DT/C; 71 Don Joyce MG/T; 61 Tony Klimek DE; 76 Volney Peters DT/T; 60 Gordon Polofsky MG; 85 Ralph Thomas DE	Linebackers (LB): 34 John Panelli; 47 Eli Popa; 51 Leo Sanford G; Defensive backs (DB): 49 Roy Barni S; 33 Ollie Matson CB/RB; 22 Don Paul CB/RB; 87 Ray Ramsey S/CB/WR; 31 Bill Svoboda S; 21 S. J. Whitman CB; Special teams (ST)	Reserve: 70 Jack Jennings T (IR); 66 Ed Listopad G (Military); 81 Fran Polsfoot WR (IR); -- Leo Sugar DE (Military); Rookies in italics
