= 1952 NFL playoffs =

American football tournament

- Dates: December 21–28, 1952
- Season: 1952
- Teams: 3
- Games played: 2
- NFL Championship Game site: Cleveland Municipal Stadium; Cleveland, Ohio
- Defending champions: Los Angeles Rams
- Champion: Detroit Lions (2nd title)
- Runner-up: Cleveland Browns
- Conference runners-up: Los Angeles Rams; Philadelphia Eagles
NFL playoffs
← 1950	1957 →

The 1952 National Football League season resulted in a tie for the National Conference championship between the Detroit Lions and Los Angeles Rams, requiring a one-game playoff. This conference championship game was played on December 21 at Briggs Stadium in Detroit; the winner then traveled to play the American Conference champion Cleveland Browns on December 28 in the NFL Championship Game. The Lions won both games, 31–21 over the Rams and 17–7 at Cleveland.

== Tournament bracket ==
National Conference playoff			NFL Championship
			A	Cleveland	7
N	Los Angeles	21	N	Detroit	17
N	Detroit	31

== National Conference championship ==
Detroit Lions 31, Los Angeles Rams 21

Quarter	1	2	3	4	Total
Rams	0	7	0	14	21
Lions	7	7	10	7	31

at Briggs Stadium in Detroit, Michigan

- Date: December 21, 1952
- Pro-Football-Reference

Game information

Scoring

- First quarter
- DET – Pat Harder 12-yard run (Harder kick). Lions 7–0
- Second quarter
- DET – Pat Harder 4-yard run (Harder kick). Lions 14–0
- LA – Tom Fears 14-yard pass from Norm Van Brocklin (Bob Waterfield kick). Lions 14–7
- Third quarter
- DET – Leon Hart 24-yard pass from Doak Walker (Harder kick) Lions 21–7
- DET – Pat Harder 43-yard field goal. Lions 24–7
- Fourth quarter
- LA – Dan Towler 5-yard run (Waterfield kick). Lions 24–14
- LA – Vitamin Smith 56-yard punt return (Waterfield kick). Lions 24–21
- DET – Bob Hoernschemeyer 9-yard run (Harder kick). Lions 31–21

Top passers

- LA – Norm Van Brocklin – 15/19, 166 yards, 1 TD
- DET – Bobby Layne – 9/21, 144 yards, 4 INT

Top rushers

- LA – Skeet Quinlan – 6 rushes, 60 yards
- DET – Pat Harder – 8 rushes, 72 yards, 2 TD

Top receivers

- LA – Tom Fears – 7 receptions, 76 yards, 1 TD
- DET – Leon Hart – 5 receptions, 86 yards, 1 TD

The Rams and Lions had matched up two times in the 1952 season, with Detroit having won each time (17–14, 24–16). The defending champion Rams did not have the services of rookie sensation Night Train Lane, who injured his ankle in the season finale. Three-point favorites at home in muddy fog, Detroit prevailed over the Rams to return to the NFL Championship for the first time in 17 years. Pat Harder had two touchdown runs to bolster a 14–7 lead before kicking extra points on two Lions touchdowns in the second half to go with a field goal, with Bob Hoernschemeyer closing out the scoring for good on a 9-yard run. Detroit had four interceptions from Bobby Layne, but Los Angeles lost two fumbles and suffered a late fourth quarter interception thrown by Bob Waterfield while being outgained in both rushing and passing. Harder set a new record for point scored by one player in a playoff game with 19, eclipsing the old record of 18 held by Andy Farkas (1943). Paul Hornung would tie the record in 1961 before it was later broken in 1995.

== NFL Championship game ==
The 1952 NFL Championship Game was held in Cleveland and was won by the Lions, 17–7.
