= Fran Rogel =

American football player (1927–2002)

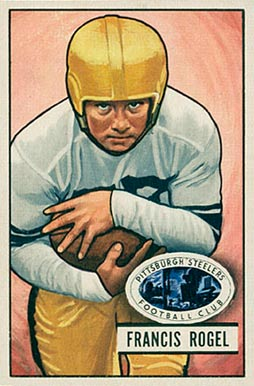
- Rogel on a 1951 Bowman football card

No. 27, 34, 33, 85
- Position: Fullback

Personal information
- Born: December 12, 1927; North Braddock, Pennsylvania, U.S.
- Died: June 3, 2002 (aged 74); Gibsonia, Pennsylvania, U.S.
- Listed height: 5 ft 11 in (1.80 m)
- Listed weight: 203 lb (92 kg)

Career information
- College: PennWest; Penn State
- NFL draft: 1950: 8th round, 100th overall pick

Career history
- Pittsburgh Steelers (1950–1957); Hamilton Tiger-Cats (1958)

Awards and highlights
- Pro Bowl (1956); Second-team All-American (1948)

Career NFL statistics
- Rushing yards: 3,271
- Rushing average: 3.6
- Receptions: 150
- Receiving yards: 1,087
- Total touchdowns: 19
- Stats at Pro Football Reference

Francis Stephen Rogel (December 12, 1927 – June 3, 2002) was an American professional football player who was a fullback for the Pittsburgh Steelers of the National Football League (NFL). He played college football for the Penn State Nittany Lions. He also played professionally for the Hamilton Tiger-Cats of the Canadian Football League (CFL).

== Collegiate career ==
Unable to enroll at Penn State due to the college's post-World War II policy of giving admissions priority to returning veterans, Rogel spent the 1946 season playing at the California State Teachers College. Along with other top-tier talent awaiting admission, he helped propel the Vulcans football team to a 9-0-0 record.

Rogel continued on to Penn State, where he was a star fullback and linebacker for three seasons. He was the Nittany Lions' leading rusher each of those seasons and was on the 1948 Cotton Bowl Classic team which tied Southern Methodist, 13-13.

== NFL and CFL ==
Rogel was selected by the Steelers in the eighth round (#100 overall) in the 1950 NFL draft. He did not miss a game his eight seasons with the team (1950–1957).

Rogel's style of play was characterized by "Hey Diddle Diddle, Rogel up the middle" — a popular cheer by Steelers fans. Head coach Walt Kiesling, a conservative-minded coach, started nearly every game by running the same play: "Rogel up the middle." One day, owner Art Rooney suggested to Kiesling to throw it instead. Not wanting to be undermined by Rooney, Kiesling had one of his lineman intentionally go offsides so it could nullify the play. Sure enough, against the rival Cleveland Browns, quarterback Jim Finks threw a touchdown pass that was nullified by the penalty. The following play after the penalty would be "Rogel up the middle."

Rogel was a Pro Bowl selection in 1956. By the time of his retirement following the 1957 season, he was the Steelers' leading career rusher with 3,271 yards. Rogel also played briefly in the Canadian Football League.

In 1959 Rogel was the playing coach of the Sarnia Golden Bears in the semi-pro ORFU. Because of his running style he was nicknamed "twinkle toes".

For eight years during the 1960s, Rogel was head football coach at North Braddock Scott High School and for eight years in the 1970s he was head coach at Highlands High School in Natrona Heights, PA. His teams made one playoff appearance.

== NFL career statistics ==
Legend
**Bold**	Career high

Year	Team	Games		Rushing					Receiving				
Year	Team	GP	GS	Att	Yds	Avg	Lng	TD	Rec	Yds	Avg	Lng	TD
1950	PIT	12	0	92	418	**4.5**	40	**3**	**24**	**304**	**12.7**	**64**	**1**
1951	PIT	12	3	109	385	3.5	51	**3**	10	59	5.9	24	0
1952	PIT	12	5	84	230	2.7	14	**3**	12	140	11.7	26	0
1953	PIT	12	10	137	527	3.8	**58**	2	19	95	5.0	19	0
1954	PIT	12	12	111	415	3.7	16	1	18	51	2.8	16	**1**
1955	PIT	12	12	**168**	**588**	3.5	19	2	**24**	222	9.3	28	0
1956	PIT	12	12	131	476	3.6	40	2	23	88	3.8	13	0
1957	PIT	12	10	68	232	3.4	23	1	20	128	6.4	18	0
		96	64	900	3,271	3.6	58	17	150	1,087	7.2	64	2

== Death ==
Rogel died of Parkinson's disease at age 74 on June 3, 2002, in Richland, Pennsylvania.
