= Ray Mathews =

American football player and coach (1929–2015)

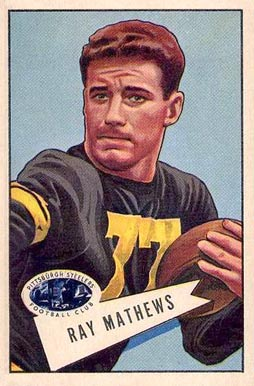
- Mathews on a 1952 Bowman football card

No. 44, 25, 22
- Positions: Halfback, end

Personal information
- Born: February 26, 1929; Dayton, Pennsylvania, U.S.
- Died: December 20, 2015 (aged 86); Mercer, Pennsylvania, U.S.
- Listed height: 6 ft 0 in (1.83 m)
- Listed weight: 185 lb (84 kg)

Career information
- High school: McKeesport Area (McKeesport, Pennsylvania)
- College: Clemson
- NFL draft: 1951: 7th round, 81st overall pick

Career history

Playing
- Pittsburgh Steelers (1951–1959); Dallas Cowboys (1960)

Coaching
- Calgary Stampeders (1961); Rhode Island Steelers (1966); Washington Redskins (1968)

Awards and highlights
- 2× Pro Bowl (1952, 1955); Pittsburgh Steelers Legends team; Pittsburgh Steelers Hall of Honor; Second-team All-SoCon (1949)

Career NFL statistics
- Rushing yards: 1,057
- Rushing average: 3.5
- Receptions: 233
- Receiving yards: 3,963
- Total touchdowns: 43
- Stats at Pro Football Reference

Raymond Dyral Mathews (February 26, 1929 – December 20, 2015) was an American professional football player who was a halfback and end in the National Football League (NFL) for the Pittsburgh Steelers and the Dallas Cowboys. He played college football for the Clemson Tigers.

== Early life ==
Mathews attended McKeesport Area High School, before moving on to Clemson University, where he played baseball and football. He was the starting halfback in a backfield that included Fred Cone.

The 1948 team finished undefeated and beat the University of Missouri, 24-23, in the 1949 Gator Bowl.

As a senior, he was a part of another undefeated season and played in the 1951 Orange Bowl, beating the University of Miami 15–14. He made an acrobatic reception for one of the touchdowns.

In 1978, he was inducted into the Clemson Athletic Hall of Fame.

== Professional career ==
=== Pittsburgh Steelers ===
Mathews was selected by the Pittsburgh Steelers in the seventh round (81st overall) of the 1951 NFL draft. He was mostly a backup to running back Fran Rogel. Because of his speed, he was switched to wide receiver in 1956. He was also used as a kickoff and punt returner.

He was the team's leading rusher in 1952, with 315 yards on 66 carries. He led the team in receiving in three straight seasons (1954-1956). He finished his Steelers career after appearing in 108 games with 230 receptions for 3,919 yards and 34 touchdowns, while rushing for 1,057 yards and five touchdowns on 300 carries. He also held the franchise records for longest reception (78 yards) and most touchdowns in a game (4). In 2007, he was named to the Pittsburgh Steelers Legends team.

=== Dallas Cowboys ===
Mathews was selected by the Dallas Cowboys in the 1960 NFL expansion draft. He was the team captain for the first game in franchise history. He appeared in 6 games as a reserve player, while reuniting with former college teammate Fred Cone.

== NFL career statistics ==
Legend
**Bold**	Career high

Year	Team	Games		Rushing					Receiving				
Year	Team	GP	GS	Att	Yds	Avg	Lng	TD	Rec	Yds	Avg	Lng	TD
1951	PIT	12	4	21	37	1.8	15	0	0	0	0.0	0	0
1952	PIT	12	11	66	**315**	4.8	**36**	0	33	543	16.5	50	5
1953	PIT	12	12	65	260	4.0	31	**2**	27	346	12.8	77	4
1954	PIT	12	12	**80**	242	3.0	24	**2**	**44**	652	14.8	**78**	**6**
1955	PIT	12	12	57	187	3.3	23	1	42	**762**	18.1	61	**6**
1956	PIT	12	12	3	-11	-3.7	2	0	31	540	17.4	64	5
1957	PIT	12	10	3	-1	-0.3	6	0	15	369	**24.6**	64	4
1958	PIT	12	11	4	24	**6.0**	14	0	25	525	21.0	65	4
1959	PIT	12	7	1	4	4.0	4	0	13	182	14.0	56	0
1960	DAL	6	2	0	0	0.0	0	0	3	44	14.7	20	0
		114	93	300	1,057	3.5	36	5	233	3,963	17.0	78	34

== Personal life ==
Early in the 1950s, he played four seasons of minor-league baseball in the St. Louis Browns farm system.

After retiring as a player, he was a high school coach for five seasons at Braddock, Pennsylvania, an assistant coach for the Washington Redskins and the Calgary Stampeders. On December 20, 2015, he died of complications from dementia.
