= 1952 Washington Redskins season =

NFL team season

- Owner: George Preston Marshall
- General manager: Dick McCann
- Head coach: Curly Lambeau
- Home stadium: Griffith Stadium

Results
- Record: 4–8
- Division place: 5th (tied) NFL American
- Playoffs: Did not qualify

The 1952 Washington Redskins season was the franchise's 21st season in the National Football League (NFL) and their 15th in Washington, D.C. the team failed to improve on their 5–7 record from 1951 and finished 4–8.

Although the NFL formally desegregated in 1946, many teams were slow to allow black athletes to compete even after the formal barrier had fallen. None were less willing to desegregate than the Washington Redskins, who sought to be the "home team" for a vast Southern market. The Redskins would remain the last bastion of racial segregation in the NFL, refusing to include a single black player on their roster until 1962.

== Preseason ==
Week	Date	Opponent	Result	Record	Venue	Attendance
1	August 17	at San Francisco 49ers	L 0–35	0–1	Kezar Stadium	35,234
2	August 21	at Los Angeles Rams	L 23–45	0–2	Los Angeles Memorial Coliseum	88,110
3	September 5	vs. Dallas Texans	L 14–27	0–3	Alamo Stadium (San Antonio, TX)	19,075
4	September 14	vs. Green Bay Packers	L 7–13	0–4	Blues Stadium (Kansas City, MO)	7,238
5	September 20	vs. Detroit Lions	L 7–45	0–5	Oklahoma Memorial Stadium (Norman, OK)	40,000

== Schedule ==
Week	Date	Opponent	Result	Record	Venue	Attendance	Recap
1	September 29	at **Chicago Cardinals**	**W** 23–7	1–0	Comiskey Park	17,837	Recap
2	October 5	at Green Bay Packers	**L** 20–35	1–1	Marquette Stadium	9,657	Recap
3	October 12	**Chicago Cardinals**	**L** 6–17	1–2	Griffith Stadium	24,600	Recap
4	October 19	at **Pittsburgh Steelers**	**W** 28–24	2–2	Forbes Field	22,604	Recap
5	October 26	at **Cleveland Browns**	**L** 15–19	2–3	Cleveland Municipal Stadium	32,496	Recap
6	November 2	**Pittsburgh Steelers**	**L** 23–24	2–4	Griffith Stadium	25,866	Recap
7	November 9	at **Philadelphia Eagles**	**L** 20–38	2–5	Shibe Park	16,932	Recap
8	November 16	San Francisco 49ers	**L** 17–23	2–6	Griffith Stadium	28,997	Recap
9	November 23	**New York Giants**	**L** 10–14	2–7	Griffith Stadium	21,125	Recap
10	November 30	**Cleveland Browns**	**L** 24–48	2–8	Griffith Stadium	22,679	Recap
11	December 7	at **New York Giants**	**W** 27–17	3–8	Polo Grounds	21,237	Recap
12	December 14	**Philadelphia Eagles**	**W** 27–21	4–8	Griffith Stadium	22,468	Recap
Note: Intra-conference opponents are in **bold** text.

=== Standings ===
NFL American Conference
	W	L	T	PCT	CONF	PF	PA	STK
Cleveland Browns	8	4	0	.667	7–3	310	213	L1
Philadelphia Eagles	7	5	0	.583	6–4	252	271	L1
New York Giants	7	5	0	.583	5–4	234	231	W1
Pittsburgh Steelers	5	7	0	.417	4–5	300	273	L1
Chicago Cardinals	4	8	0	.333	3–7	172	221	L2
Washington Redskins	4	8	0	.333	4–6	240	287	W2

Note: Tie games were not officially counted in the standings until 1972.

== Personnel ==
=== Roster ===
1952 Washington Redskins roster
Quarterbacks (QB): 33 Sammy Baugh; 14 Eddie LeBaron P; Running backs (RB): 34 Jack Cloud LB; 12 Harry Gilmer QB/S; 32 Leon Heath; 22 Charlie Justice P; 25 John Papit; 20 Julie Rykovich; Wide receivers (WR): 80 Gene Brito; 84 Hugh Taylor; Tight ends (TE)	Offensive linemen (OL): 60 Buddy Brown G; 65 Jim Clark G; 53 Al DeMao C/LB; 72 Joe Moss T; 74 Laurie Niemi T/DT; 61 Gene Pepper G; 56 Dick Woodard C/LB; Defensive linemen (DL): 82 Ed Berrang DE; 75 Ed Ecker DT; 88 Jerry Hennessy DE; 76 Paul Lipscomb DT; 55 Jim Ricca MG/T; 79 John Yonakor DE/DT	Linebackers (LB): 39 George Buksar K/FB; 36 Chuck Drazenovich FB; 68 Knox Ramsey G; 89 Joe Tereshinski WR/DE; Defensive backs (DB): 42 Dick Alban CB; 40 Bill Cox S/P/WR; 26 Andy Davis CB; 44 Harry Dowda CB/RB; 43 Johnny Williams S/RB; Special teams (ST)	Reserve: -- Al Dorow QB (Military); -- Rob Goode RB (Military); -- Hall Haynes S (Military); 70 Lou Karras T (IR); -- Chet Ostrowski DE (Military); -- Vic Thomas T (Military); -- Cas Witucki G (Military); -- Walt Yowarsky DE (Military); Rookies in italics
