= George Hays (American football) =

American football player (1924–2007)

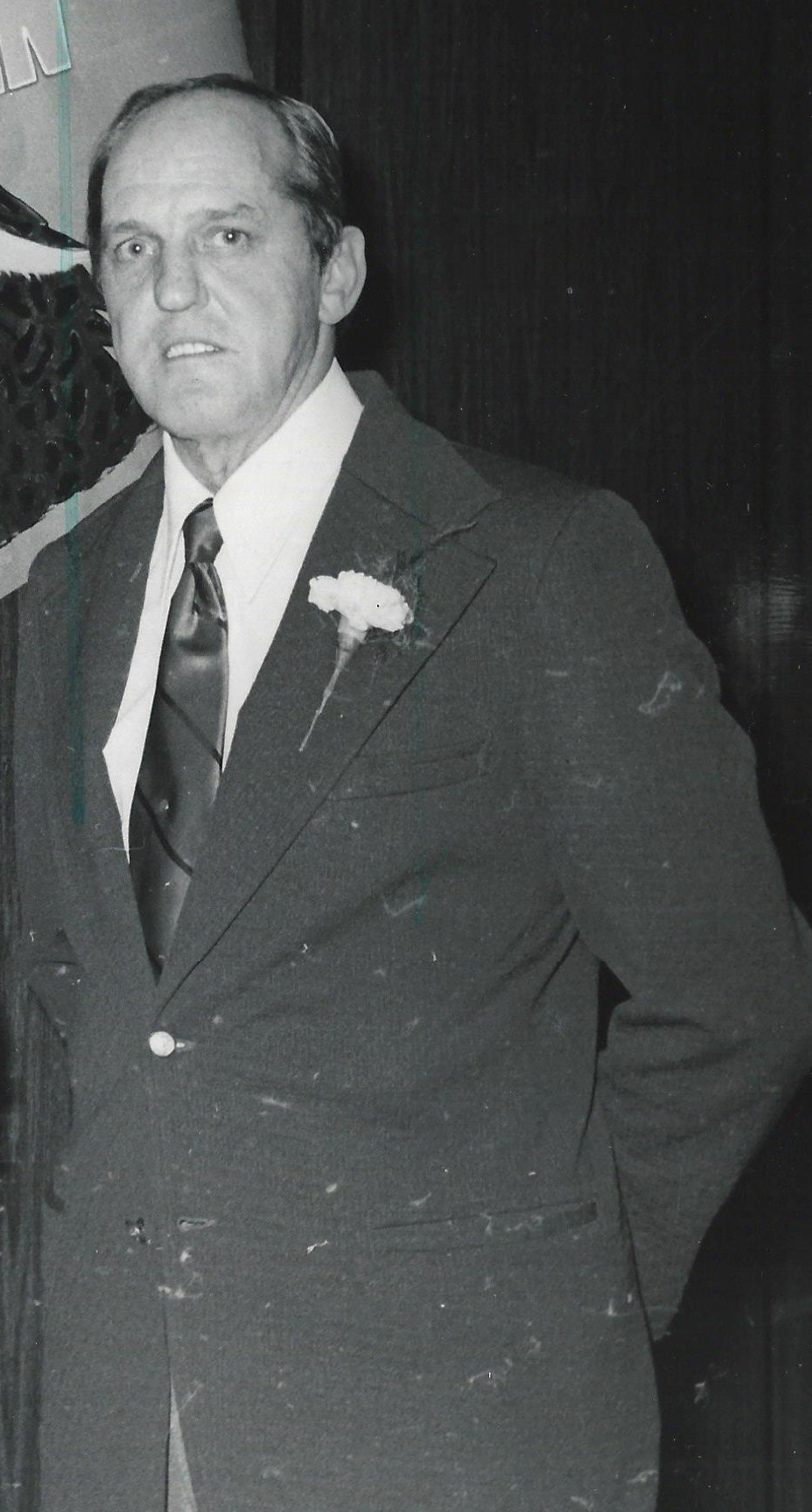
- Coach George Hays 1977

No. 80, 75, 82, 88
- Position: Defensive end

Personal information
- Born: August 29, 1924; Glassport, Pennsylvania, U.S.
- Died: April 20, 2007 (aged 82); Elizabeth Township, Pennsylvania, U.S.
- Listed height: 6 ft 2 in (1.88 m)
- Listed weight: 211 lb (96 kg)

Career information
- High school: Glassport (Pennsylvania)
- College: St. Bonaventure

Career history
- Pittsburgh Steelers (1950–1952); Green Bay Packers (1953)

Career statistics
- Games played: 44
- Interceptions: 1
- Fumbles recovered: 3
- Stats at Pro Football Reference

George Hays (August 29, 1924 – April 20, 2007) was a defensive end in the National Football League.

== Biography ==
Hays was born George William Hays in Glassport, Pennsylvania. Hays was inducted into the Mon Valley Sports Hall of Fame on December 16, 1977, at the Big Ten Banquet.

== Career ==
George Hays served in the US Army during World War II. He played football at the collegiate level at St. Bonaventure University. Then he spent three seasons (1950–1952) with the Pittsburgh Steelers, before playing his final season with the Green Bay Packers in 1953. He played as a defensive end for both teams.

After his NFL career, he worked as a school teacher for the Elizabeth Forward School District. He also taught at Glassport High School, Monessen City School District, and Braddock High School. All four districts are located in southwestern Pennsylvania. He was also a football coach for the University of Dayton.

In 2001, Hays was given an Honorable Mention on the Steelers Depot's All-Undrafted team for the Defensive End position.
