= Bob Stringer =

American football player (1929–1998)

No. 44
- Positions: Fullback, linebacker, safety

Personal information
- Born: October 8, 1929; Shawnee, Oklahoma, U.S.
- Died: September 18, 1998 (aged 68)
- Listed height: 6 ft 1 in (1.85 m)
- Listed weight: 197 lb (89 kg)

Career information
- High school: Shawnee
- College: Tulsa
- NFL draft: 1952: 14th round, 161st overall pick

Career history
- Philadelphia Eagles (1952–1953); Calgary Stampeders (1957)*
- * Offseason or practice squad member only

Career NFL statistics
- Interceptions: 2
- Rushing yards: 10
- Rushing average: 3.3
- Receptions: 1
- Receiving yards: 4
- Stats at Pro Football Reference

Robert Jean Stringer (October 8, 1929 – September 18, 1998) was an American professional football player who was a fullback, linebacker, and safety who played two seasons in the National Football League (NFL) for the Philadelphia Eagles. He played college football for the Tulsa Golden Hurricane and was selected by the Eagles in the 14th round (161st overall) of the 1952 NFL draft.

== Early life and education ==
Stringer was born on October 8, 1929, in Shawnee, Oklahoma. He attended Shawnee High School there, graduating in c. 1948. After his graduation, Stringer played college football for The University of Tulsa. Though he did not see action during his freshman year of 1948, he was on their varsity roster in the next three seasons.

== Professional career ==
After finishing his education, Stringer was selected in the 14th round (161st overall) of the 1952 NFL draft by the Philadelphia Eagles. He made their final roster, playing the fullback and linebacker positions. Overall, in the 1952 season, he appeared in all twelve games, but was not a starter in any. On defense, he made one interception, returning it nine yards, and recovered one fumble.

Offensively in 1952, Stringer recorded two rushes, gaining five yards. He also made his only career reception, on a four-yard pass in the season finale, a 21–27 loss against the Washington Redskins. On special teams, he returned one kickoff twenty-two yards. The Eagles finished the season with a 7–5 record, placing second in the NFL American Conference.

Stringer returned to the team for their 1953 season, shifting his position to right safety on defense. He again appeared in all twelve games, but saw no time as a starter. He made one interception on defense, returning it seven yards, and made one rush offensively, gaining five yards. He also returned one kickoff for eleven yards.

Stringer left the Eagles in 1954 to serve in the United States Army. He did not return to the team.

== Death ==
Stringer died on September 18, 1998, at the age of 68.
