= Gary Kerkorian =

American football and rugby league player (1930–2000)

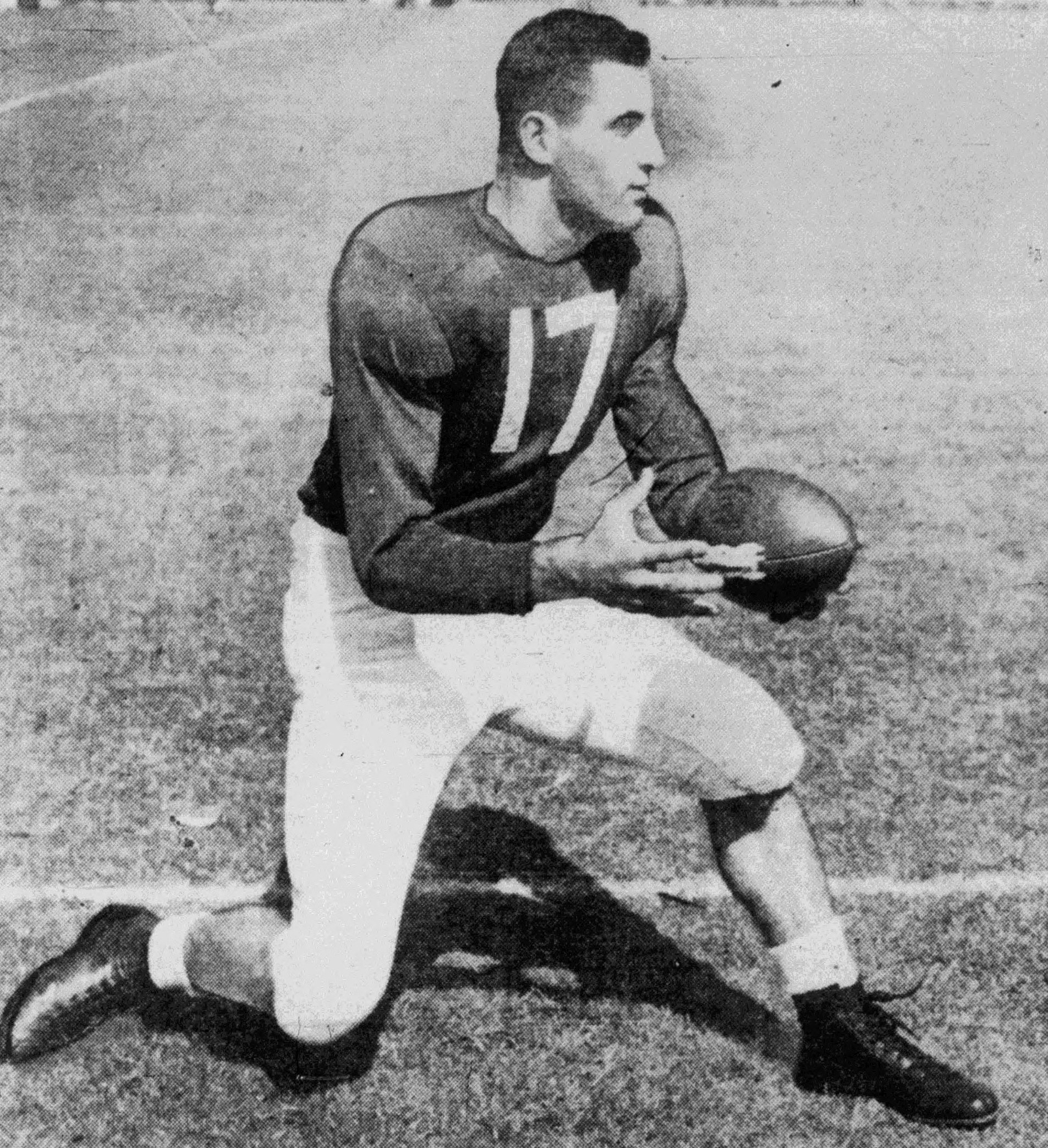
- Kerkorian, circa 1951

No. 17, 18
- Position: Quarterback

Personal information
- Born: January 14, 1930; Los Angeles, California, U.S.
- Died: May 22, 2000 (aged 70); Fresno, California, U.S.
- Listed height: 5 ft 11 in (1.80 m)
- Listed weight: 185 lb (84 kg)

Career information
- High school: Inglewood (Inglewood, California)
- College: Stanford
- NFL draft: 1952: 19th round, 222nd overall pick

Career history
- Pittsburgh Steelers (1952); Baltimore Colts (1954–1956)

Awards and highlights
- First-team All-American (1951); First-team All-PCC (1951)

Career NFL statistics
- Passing attempts: 259
- Passing completions: 139
- Completion percentage: 53.7%
- TD–INT: 12–18
- Passing yards: 1,862
- Passer rating: 63.2
- Stats at Pro Football Reference

Gary Ray Kerkorian (January 14, 1930 – May 22, 2000) was an American professional football player who was a quarterback for four seasons in the National Football League (NFL).

== College career ==
Born into an Armenian family, Kerkorian attended Inglewood High School in Los Angeles County, and then was a quarterback at Stanford University, where he was a three-year starter. At the end of his senior season of 1951, he held every Stanford passing record and was named a first-team All-American, leading the Indians to a 9-1 record, the Pac-8 championship, and a Rose Bowl berth. He is a member of the Stanford Athletic Hall of Fame.

== NFL career ==
He was selected by the Pittsburgh Steelers in the 19th round of the 1952 NFL draft, and saw duty as both a quarterback and placekicker.

He was traded to the Baltimore Colts and emerged as the starting quarterback for the 1954 season, though the Colts' record was a dismal 3-9. The Colts won the lottery bonus pick for the 1955 NFL draft, giving them the first overall draft pick. They selected George Shaw, a quarterback from the University of Oregon, and Kerkorian was soon relegated to backup duty. (Coincidentally, Shaw was the younger brother of Tom Shaw, whom Kerkorian had replaced as starting Stanford quarterback in 1949.) The following year, the Colts acquired rookie Johnny Unitas, and Kerkorian slipped to third string.

== Rugby League ==
Between the 1952 and 1953 NFL seasons, Kerkorian toured with the United States national rugby league team to Australia, where he played the 5/8 position and kicked many goals.

== After football ==
Kerkorian left football after the 1955 season to attend law school at Georgetown University. After an injury to Unitas in 1958, the Colts called Kerkorian back from law school as a possible replacement, but he did not play.

Kerkorian worked as an attorney in California, and was named a Superior Court Judge in Fresno, California in 1990. He retired in January 2000, and died a few months later.
