= Rudy Andabaker =

American football player (1928–2016)

Profile
- Position: OG

Personal information
- Born: August 1, 1928; Donora, Pennsylvania, U.S.
- Died: September 25, 2016 (aged 88); Bridgeville, Pennsylvania, U.S.

Career information
- College: Pitt
- NFL draft: 1952: undrafted

Career history
- Pittsburgh Steelers (1952, 1954)

Career NFL statistics
- Games: 10
- Stats at Pro Football Reference

Rudolph Edward "Rudy" Andabaker (August 1, 1928 – September 25, 2016) was a professional American football offensive guard in the National Football League (NFL).
