= Bill Horrell =

American football player (1930–2019)

No. 62
- Position: Guard

Personal information
- Born: March 15, 1930; New Kensington, Pennsylvania, U.S.
- Died: April 7, 2019 (aged 89)
- Listed height: 5 ft 11 in (1.80 m)
- Listed weight: 222 lb (101 kg)

Career information
- High school: New Kensington
- College: Michigan State

Career history
- Philadelphia Eagles (1952)
- Stats at Pro Football Reference

William George Horrell (March 15, 1930 – April 7, 2019) was an American football quarterback who played for the Philadelphia Eagles. He played college football at Michigan State University, having previously attended New Kensington High School.

Horrell died on April 7, 2019, at the age of 89.
