= Dick Hensley =

American football player (1927–2015)

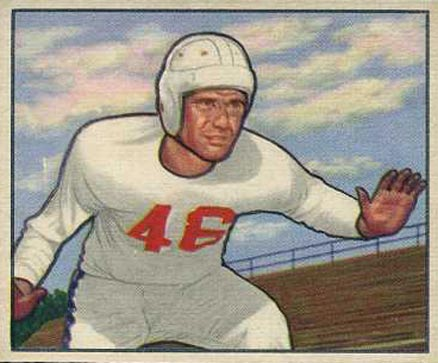
- Hensley on a 1950 Bowman football card

No. 85, 42, 82
- Position: End / Defensive end

Personal information
- Born: September 8, 1927; Williamson, West Virginia, U.S.
- Died: March 7, 2015 (aged 87); Huntington, West Virginia, U.S.
- Listed height: 6 ft 4 in (1.93 m)
- Listed weight: 213 lb (97 kg)

Career information
- High school: Williamson
- College: Kentucky (1945–1948)
- NFL draft: 1949: 11th round, 106th overall pick

Career history
- New York Giants (1949); Richmond Rebels (1950); Chicago Bears (1952)*; Pittsburgh Steelers (1952); Chicago Bears (1953); Orlando Broncos (1963)
- * Offseason or practice squad member only

Career NFL statistics
- Receptions: 19
- Receiving yards: 358
- Touchdowns: 2
- Stats at Pro Football Reference

Richard Earl Hensley (September 8, 1927 – March 7, 2015) was an American professional football end who played three seasons in the National Football League (NFL) with the New York Giants, Pittsburgh Steelers and Chicago Bears. He was selected by the Giants in the eleventh round of the 1949 NFL draft after playing college football at the University of Kentucky.

== Early life and college ==
Richard Earl Hensley' was born on September 8, 1927, in Williamson, West Virginia. He attended Williamson High School in Williamson.

He lettered for the Kentucky Wildcats from 1945 to 1947.

== Professional career ==
Hensley was selected by the New York Giants in the 11th round, with the 106th overall pick, of the 1949 NFL draft. He played in 11 games during his rookie year in 1949, catching three passes for 24 yards. In 1950, he was place on the reserve list due to military service. He also played in eight games, starting three, for the Richmond Rebels of the American Football League during the 1950 season and scored three receiving touchdowns. He became an NFL free agent in May 1951.

Hensley signed with the Chicago Bears in 1952. On September 14, 1952, he was traded to the Pittsburgh Steelers. He played in 11 games, starting three, for the Steelers during the 1952 season, recording 12 receptions for 217 yards and two touchdowns.

On September 7, 1953, Hensley was traded back to the Bears. He appeared in 11 games, starting one, in 1953, totaling four receptions for 117 yards, one fumble recovery and one safety. He became a free agent in May 1954.

In 1963, he played for the Orlando Broncos of the Southern Football League. He was also a defensive coach for the Broncos that season.

== Later life ==
Hensley died on March 7, 2015, in Huntington, West Virginia.
