= Tom Shaw (American football) =

American football player (1928–2017)

Profile
- Position: Quarterback

Personal information
- Born: December 11, 1928; Portland, Oregon, U.S.
- Died: December 23, 2017 (aged 89)

Career information
- High school: Grant (Portland, Oregon)
- College: Stanford

Thomas Leonard Shaw (December 11, 1928 – December 23, 2017) was an American football quarterback.

== Football career ==
Shaw was born in Portland, Oregon, where, as a high school football quarterback, he led Grant High School to back-to-back state football championships in 1946 and 1947. Shaw also played basketball and baseball for Grant and was inducted into the Portland Interscholastic League Hall of Fame in 2005.

Shaw played college baseball and football for Stanford University, and was the starting quarterback for the 1948 season. Shaw was the backup to Gary Kerkorian for the 1949 and 1950 seasons. (Kerkorian, in turn, would become the backup to Shaw's younger brother George for the NFL's Baltimore Colts in 1955.)
