= Maury Nipp =

American football player (1930–2019)

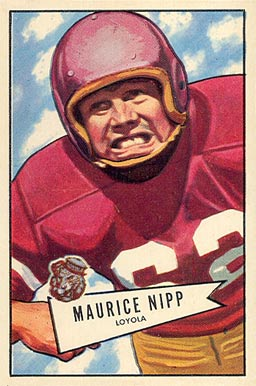
- Nipp on a 1952 Bowman football card

No. 68
- Position: Guard

Personal information
- Born: March 31, 1930; Yankton, South Dakota, U.S.
- Died: March 7, 2019 (aged 88)
- Listed height: 6 ft 0 in (1.83 m)
- Listed weight: 219 lb (99 kg)

Career information
- High school: Excelsior (Norwalk, California)
- College: Loyola (1948–1951)
- NFL draft: 1952: 9th round, 101st overall pick

Career history
- Philadelphia Eagles (1952–1953, 1956); Washington Redskins (1957)*
- * Offseason or practice squad member only

Career NFL statistics
- Games played: 25
- Games started: 21
- Fumble recoveries: 1
- Stats at Pro Football Reference

Maurice Herman Nipp (March 31, 1930 – March 7, 2019) was an American professional football player who was a guard for three seasons with the Philadelphia Eagles of the National Football League (NFL). He was selected by the Eagles in the ninth round of the 1952 NFL draft. Nipp played college football for the Loyola Lions.

== Early life ==
Maurice Herman Nipp was born in Yankton, South Dakota on March 31, 1930. He attended Excelsior High School in Norwalk, California.

== College career ==
Nipp was a member of the Loyola Lions of Loyola University of Los Angeles from 1948 to 1951. He was the captain of the 1951 Lions, the final team in school history. He was inducted into the school's athletics hall of fame in 1987. In 1987, the Los Angeles Times noted that Nipp was "probably the best lineman in Loyola history".

== Professional career ==
Nipp was selected by the Philadelphia Eagles in the ninth round, with the 101st overall pick, of the 1952 NFL draft. He was released by the Eagles later that year but re-signed on October 14, 1952. He played in ten games, starting seven, for the Eagles during the 1952 season. Nipp started all 12 games for the Eagles in 1953, recording one fumble recovery. The team finished the year second in the Eastern Conference with a 7–4–1 record. Nipp then served two years in the United States Air Force, returning to the Eagles in 1956. He appeared in three games, starting two, that season before being placed on injured reserve. He became a free agent after the 1956 season.

He signed with the Washington Redskins on March 17, 1957. He was released later in 1957.

== Death ==
Nipp died on March 7, 2019, at the age of 88.
