= 1952 New York Giants season =

NFL team season

- Owner: Tim Mara
- Head coach: Steve Owen
- Home stadium: Polo Grounds

Results
- Record: 7–5
- Division place: T-2nd NFL American
- Playoffs: Did not qualify

The 1952 New York Giants season was the franchise's 28th season in the National Football League. The Giants finished tied for second place with the Philadelphia Eagles. The teams win loss record was 7 wins and 5 losses.

== Schedule ==
Game	Date	Opponent	Result	Record	Venue	Attendance	Recap	Sources
1	September 28	at Dallas Texans	**W** 24–6	1–0	Cotton Bowl	17,499	Recap	
2	October 4	at **Philadelphia Eagles**	**W** 31–7	2–0	Shibe Park	18,648	Recap	
3	October 12	at **Cleveland Browns**	**W** 17–9	3–0	Cleveland Municipal Stadium	51,858	Recap	
4	October 19	**Chicago Cardinals**	**L** 23–24	3–1	Polo Grounds	41,182	Recap	
5	October 26	**Philadelphia Eagles**	**L** 10–14	3–2	Polo Grounds	21,458	Recap	
6	November 2	at **Chicago Cardinals**	**W** 28–6	4–2	Comiskey Park	27,195	Recap	
7	November 9	San Francisco 49ers	**W** 23–14	5–2	Polo Grounds	54,230	Recap	
8	November 16	Green Bay Packers	**L** 3–17	5–3	Polo Grounds	26,723	Recap	
9	November 23	at **Washington Redskins**	**W** 14–10	6–3	Griffith Stadium	21,125	Recap	
10	November 30	at **Pittsburgh Steelers**	**L** 7–63	6–4	Forbes Field	15,140	Recap	
11	December 7	**Washington Redskins**	**L** 17–27	6–5	Polo Grounds	21,237	Recap	
12	December 14	**Cleveland Browns**	**W** 37–34	7–5	Polo Grounds	41,610	Recap	
Note: Intra-conference opponents are in **bold** text.

== Standings ==
NFL American Conference
	W	L	T	PCT	CONF	PF	PA	STK
Cleveland Browns	8	4	0	.667	7–3	310	213	L1
Philadelphia Eagles	7	5	0	.583	6–4	252	271	L1
New York Giants	7	5	0	.583	5–4	234	231	W1
Pittsburgh Steelers	5	7	0	.417	4–5	300	273	L1
Chicago Cardinals	4	8	0	.333	3–7	172	221	L2
Washington Redskins	4	8	0	.333	4–6	240	287	W2

Note: Tie games were not officially counted in the standings until 1972.

== Roster ==
1952 New York Giants roster
Quarterbacks (QB): 42 Charlie Conerly; Running backs (RB): 16 Frank Gifford S; 31 Eddie Price; 44 Kyle Rote; 30 Joe Scott; 20 George Thomas; 87 Bob Wilkinson; Wide receivers (WR): 89 Bob Hudson; 88 Bob McChesney; 80 Kelley Mote; 81 Bill Stribling; Tight ends (TE)	Offensive linemen (OL): 65 Ray Beck G; 79 Tex Coulter T/C; 78 Al DeRogatis T; 67 George Kennard G; 66 Hal Mitchell T; 53 John Rapacz C; 21 Joe Sulaitis G/LB; 72 Dick Yelvington T; Defensive linemen (DL): 75 Bill Albright DT; 60 Jon Baker MG; 86 Jim Duncan DE; 70 Ray Krouse DT; 82 Ray Poole DE/K; 83 Bud Sherrod DE; 73 Arnie Weinmeister DT	Linebackers (LB): 52 John Cannady C; 35 Pat Knight; Defensive backs (DB): 12 John Amberg CB/S/RB; 49 Tom Landry S/P/QB; 38 Don Menasco CB; 22 Harmon Rowe CB; 45 Emlen Tunnell S; Special teams (ST)	Reserve: -- Bill Austin G (Military); 47 Fred Benners QB (IR); -- Randy Clay RB/CB (Military); -- Tom Finnin DT (Military); Rookies in italics

== See also ==
- List of New York Giants seasons
