= Lynn Chandnois =

American football player (1925–2011)

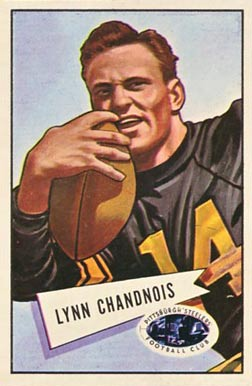
- Chandnois on a 1952 Bowman football card

No. 14, 49
- Position: Back

Personal information
- Born: February 24, 1925; Fayette, Michigan, U.S.
- Died: April 19, 2011 (aged 86); Flint, Michigan, U.S.
- Listed height: 6 ft 2 in (1.88 m)
- Listed weight: 198 lb (90 kg)

Career information
- High school: Flint Central
- College: Michigan State
- NFL draft: 1950: 1st round, 8th overall pick

Career history
- Pittsburgh Steelers (1950–1956)

Awards and highlights
- 2× Pro Bowl (1952-1953); First-team All-American (1949)

Career NFL statistics
- Rushing yards: 1,934
- Rushing average: 3.3
- Receptions: 162
- Receiving yards: 2,012
- Total touchdowns: 26
- Stats at Pro Football Reference

Lynn Chandnois (February 24, 1925 – April 19, 2011) was an American professional football player for the Pittsburgh Steelers of the National Football League (NFL). He played college football for the Michigan State Spartans, earning first-team All-American honors in 1949. He won the NFL Player of the Year award for the Steelers in 1952, and played twice in the Pro Bowl.

== Biography ==
=== Early life ===
Lynn Chandnois was born in the Upper Peninsula of Michigan on February 24, 1925. He moved to Flint, Michigan, to live with an aunt and attend school. Chandnois earned All-State honors at Flint Central High School in basketball and football.

After graduating in 1944, he joined the United States Naval Air Corps and served for two years where he achieved the rank of Aviation Machinist's Mate 3rd Class Petty Officer.

=== Collegiate career ===
Chandnois a 6 ft. 2 in. 195 lb halfback, defensive back and kick returner attended Michigan State University and was a four-year football standout for the Spartans. He also played basketball for one year. He ranks first in career interceptions (20) and interception return yardage (384), and was the team's MVP in 1948 and an All-American in 1949. He was the State of Michigan's Outstanding Amateur Athlete in 1950.

=== Professional career ===
He was selected by the Pittsburgh Steelers in the first round (eighth overall) of the 1950 NFL draft. He played in seven NFL seasons with the Steelers from 1950 to 1956.

=== Death and legacy ===
Lynn died on April 19, 2011, in Flint, Michigan, survived by his wife Paulette, daughters Lynda Harris of Grand Blanc, Michigan, and Suzanne Arnold of Prescott, Arizona.

Only Gale Sayers has a higher lifetime NFL kickoff return average.

== NFL career statistics ==
Legend
**Bold**	Career high

Year	Team	Games		Rushing					Receiving				
Year	Team	GP	GS	Att	Yds	Avg	Lng	TD	Rec	Yds	Avg	Lng	TD
1950	PIT	12	4	71	216	3.0	17	0	7	158	**22.6**	51	0
1951	PIT	12	8	108	332	3.1	34	2	28	**440**	15.7	**55**	**4**
1952	PIT	12	9	97	298	3.1	25	1	28	370	13.2	48	2
1953	PIT	12	11	**123**	**470**	**3.8**	**38**	3	**43**	412	9.6	**55**	0
1954	PIT	11	1	45	147	3.3	15	1	22	176	8.0	23	0
1955	PIT	9	9	105	353	3.4	23	**5**	27	385	14.3	51	0
1956	PIT	5	3	44	118	2.7	28	4	7	71	10.1	17	1
		73	45	593	1,934	3.3	38	16	162	2,012	12.4	55	7
