= Billy Cross (American football) =

American gridiron football player (1929–2013)

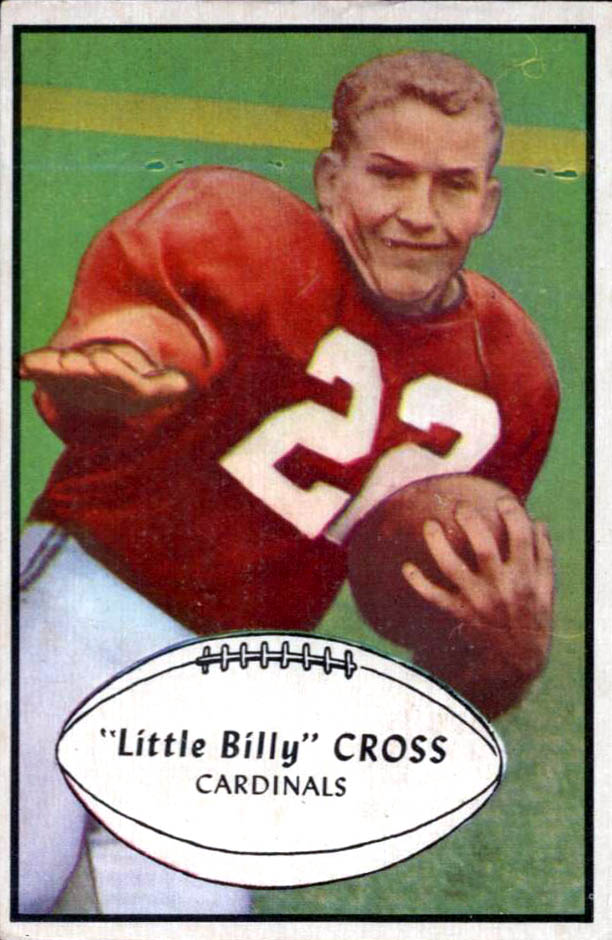
- Cross on a 1953 Bowman football card

No. 90, 20, 93
- Position: Running back

Personal information
- Born: May 3, 1929; Fry, Texas, U.S.
- Died: July 5, 2013 (aged 84); Canadian, Texas, U.S.
- Listed height: 5 ft 6 in (1.68 m)
- Listed weight: 151 lb (68 kg)

Career information
- High school: Canadian
- College: West Texas A&M (1947–1950)
- NFL draft: 1951: 24th round, 283rd overall pick

Career history
- Chicago Cardinals (1951–1953); Toronto Argonauts (1954)

Awards and highlights
- IRFU All-Star: 1954

Career NFL statistics
- Rushing yards: 826
- Rushing average: 4.7
- Receptions: 52
- Receiving yards: 841
- Total touchdowns: 12
- Stats at Pro Football Reference

William Jarrel Cross (May 3, 1929 – July 5, 2013) was an American professional football player who was a halfback for three seasons for the Chicago Cardinals of the National Football League (NFL).

== Early life ==
Billy Cross was born May 3, 1929, in Fry, Texas. He attended high school in Canadian, Texas, where he was a star athlete in three sports, earning four athletic letters each in football, basketball, and track and field.

During high school his track specialty was as a jumper, going to the Texas state meet for both the high jump and long jump.

== College career ==
Cross' exploits were particularly apparent on the gridiron. He attended West Texas State College (today's West Texas A&M University) where the speedy back set the school record for rushing — 2,474 yards gained, with an average of 9.2 yards per carry. This record would stand until 1968, when it was broken by future Miami Dolphins halfback Mercury Morris.

His best collegiate season with the Buffaloes was 1950, when Cross teamed up with his backfield running mate Charles Wright to rush for 2,400 yards, a new single-season record for a rushing tandem.

== Professional career ==
Cross played for the Chicago Cardinals of the National Football League (NFL) for three seasons — 1951, 1952, and 1953. Cross played both left and right halfback during his time with the Cardinals, gaining more than 800 yards both as a runner and a receiver and scoring a total of 12 touchdowns.

Ahead of the 1951 season, the diminutive 5'6" Cross was touted as the smallest player in the National Football League. What Cross lacked in size he made up in speed, earning the nickname "The Canadian Comet" — a reference to the name of the town in Texas from whence he came. Ironically, The Canadian Comet would finish his career playing in Canada the country, finishing his career as an all-star in the Interprovincial Rugby Football Union with the Toronto Argonauts in 1954.

== Life after football ==
After his time in professional football, Cross became an educator, teaching back home in Canadian from 1968 until 1989. He married the former Joyce Bebee in Shattuck, Oklahoma in 1972. Together the couple had five children.

== Death and legacy ==
Cross died in Canadian, Texas on July 5, 2013. He was 84 years old at the time of his death. He is memorialized with a statue at Canadian's Wildcats stadium, installed in August 2012.
