= Don Panciera =

American gridiron football player (1927–2012)

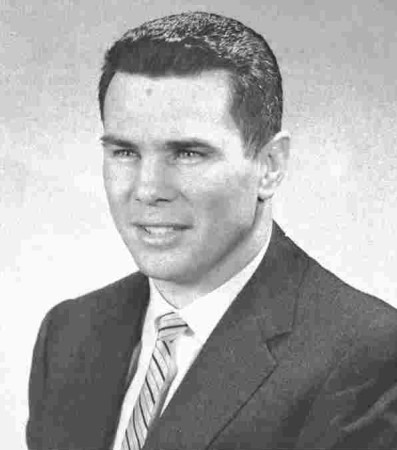

No. 60, 28, 9
- Positions: Quarterback, halfback, defensive back

Personal information
- Born: June 23, 1927; Westerly, Rhode Island, U.S.
- Died: February 9, 2012 (aged 84); Westerly, Rhode Island, U.S.
- Listed height: 6 ft 1 in (1.85 m)
- Listed weight: 192 lb (87 kg)

Career information
- High school: La Salle Academy (Providence, Rhode Island)
- College: Boston College (1946); San Francisco (1947–1948)
- NFL draft: 1949: 4th round, 41st overall pick

Career history
- New York Yankees (1949); Detroit Lions (1950); Chicago Cardinals (1952); Toronto Argonauts (1953); Ottawa Rough Riders (1954)*
- * Offseason or practice squad member only

Awards and highlights
- Second-team All-Eastern (1946)

Career NFL/AAFC statistics
- Passing attempts: 246
- Passing completions: 86
- Completion percentage: 35.0%
- TD–INT: 10–25
- Passing yards: 1,383
- Passer rating: 28.6
- Stats at Pro Football Reference

Donald Matthew Panciera (June 23, 1927 – February 9, 2012) was an American football quarterback, halfback, and defensive back in the All-America Football Conference (AAFC) and the National Football League (NFL). He played for the New York Yankees (AAFC), the Detroit Lions, and the Chicago Cardinals. He played college football for the Boston College Eagles and the San Francisco Dons.

== Early life ==
Panciera was a two time first-team All-State quarterback honors for La Salle Academy in 1944 and 1945. He quarterbacked La Salle teams to some of the school's greatest seasons. As a senior in 1945 he led the Maroon to an undefeated season and a trip to New Orleans for a special high school bowl game at Tulane Stadium.

== College career ==
He was a starting quarterback for Boston College and the University of San Francisco.

== Professional career ==
Despite being selected by the Philadelphia Eagles in the fourth round of the 1949 NFL draft, Panciera joined the New York Yankees of the All-America Football Conference who selected him in the sixth round of the 1949 AAFC Draft. In 12 games, he completed 51 of 150 passes for 5 touchdowns and 16 interceptions. The conference folded after the 1949 season, so in 1950 Panciera played defensive back for the Detroit Lions, recording 1 interception in 4 games. In 1952, he joined the Chicago Cardinals of the National Football League. In 8 games he completed 35 of 96 passes for 582 yards, 5 touchdowns, and 9 interceptions.

In 1953, Panciera joined the Toronto Argonauts of the Interprovincial Rugby Football Union, but appeared in only 1 game. He signed with the Ottawa Rough Riders in 1954 but was later released after being beat out by Johnny Gramling.

== Personal life ==
After his playing days he served as an assistant coach at the University of Dayton for three years and Boston College for a year. In 1960, he began working for General Motors in New England and in 1970 was awarded a GM dealership in Wakefield, Rhode Island.
