= 1952 Cleveland Browns season =

NFL team season

- Owner: Mickey McBride
- General manager: Paul Brown
- Head coach: Paul Brown
- Home stadium: Cleveland Stadium

Results
- Record: 8–4
- Division place: 1st NFL American
- Playoffs: Lost NFL Championship (vs. Lions) 7–17
- All-Pros: 6: DE Len Ford (1st team); DG Bill Willis (1st team); T Lou Groza (1st team); C Frank Gatski (1st team); QB Otto Graham (2nd team); E Mac Speedie (2nd team)
- Pro Bowlers: Dub Jones, HB; Horace Gillom, E Lou Groza, LT; Otto Graham, QB; Len Ford, DE; Bill Willis, LB; Abe Gibron, G Mac Speedie, E

The 1952 Cleveland Browns season was the team's third season with the National Football League and seventh season overall. They were 8–4 in the regular season and won the American Conference. Cleveland hosted the NFL Championship Game, but lost 17–7 to the Detroit Lions.

== Exhibition schedule ==
Week	Date	Opponent	Result	Record	Venue	Attendance
1	August 23	at Green Bay Packers	W 21–14	1–0	City Stadium	22,215
2	August 29	Chicago Bears	W 14–7	2–0	Cleveland Municipal Stadium	37,976
3	September 6	vs. Detroit Lions	L 21–28	2–1	Archbold Stadium	26,000
4	September 13	vs. San Francisco 49ers	L 31–35	2–2	Rubber Bowl	30,119

== Regular season ==
=== Schedule ===
Week	Date	Opponent	Result	Record	Venue	Attendance	Recap
1	September 28	Los Angeles Rams	**W** 37–7	1–0	Cleveland Municipal Stadium	57,832	Recap
2	October 4	at **Pittsburgh Steelers**	**W** 21–20	2–0	Forbes Field	27,923	Recap
3	October 12	**New York Giants**	**L** 9–17	2–1	Cleveland Municipal Stadium	51,858	Recap
4	October 19	at **Philadelphia Eagles**	**W** 49–7	3–1	Shibe Park	27,874	Recap
5	October 26	**Washington Redskins**	**W** 19–15	4–1	Cleveland Municipal Stadium	32,496	Recap
6	November 2	at Detroit Lions	**L** 6–17	4–2	Briggs Stadium	56,029	Recap
7	November 9	**Chicago Cardinals**	**W** 28–13	5–2	Cleveland Municipal Stadium	34,097	Recap
8	November 16	**Pittsburgh Steelers**	**W** 29–28	6–2	Cleveland Municipal Stadium	34,973	Recap
9	November 23	**Philadelphia Eagles**	**L** 20–28	6–3	Cleveland Municipal Stadium	28,948	Recap
10	November 30	at **Washington Redskins**	**W** 48–24	7–3	Griffith Stadium	22,679	Recap
11	December 7	at **Chicago Cardinals**	**W** 10–0	8–3	Comiskey Park	24,541	Recap
12	December 14	at **New York Giants**	**L** 34–37	8–4	Polo Grounds	41,610	Recap
Note: Intra-division opponents are in **bold** text.

=== Game summaries ===
==== Week 1 ====
The Browns avenged their December championship game loss to Los Angeles with a 37–7 romp over the Rams at Cleveland Stadium. The Browns took a 23–0 halftime lead and never headed. Ken Carpenter rushed for 145 yards on 16 carries and the Browns defense limited Rams quarterbacks Norm Van Brocklin and Bob Waterfield to a combined six completions in 27 attempts.

==== Week 4 ====
Despite being without injured wide receiver Dante Lavelli and Carpenter and then losing defensive end Bob Gain to a broken jaw, the Browns had little problem pounding the Eagles 49–7 in Philadelphia. It is Cleveland's 5th win over Philadelphia in as many meetings. Otto Graham threw for 290 yards and four touchdowns and even backup quarterback George Ratterman got into the act, throwing an 11-yard touchdown pass to Horace Gillom.

==== Week 6 ====
In the first-ever regular season meeting between the Detroit Lions and the Browns, the Lions won 17–6, at Briggs Stadium. The Lions led 10–6, when a Graham pass intended for Ray Renfro was picked off by Detroit's Jack Christiansen. On the Lions next play from scrimmage, Bob Hoernschemeyer ran for 41 yards, setting up a Bobby Layne to Leon Hart touchdown pass.

==== Week 10 ====
The Browns took a one-game lead in the Eastern Conference with a 48–24 win at Washington. Chick Jagade ran for 127 yards on 16 carries, including a 17-yard touchdown scamper on a draw play. Carpenter also had a big day returning punts including one for 53 yards and a touchdown.

==== Week 12 ====
Needing a win in the season finale to clinch the American Conference Title, the Browns (8–3) traveled to the Polo Grounds in New York City, but lost to the Giants, 37–34. Charlie Conerly fired four touchdown passes for the Giants while Graham threw three interceptions. The Browns clinched anyway when Washington upset Philadelphia.

=== Standings ===
NFL American Conference
	W	L	T	PCT	CONF	PF	PA	STK
Cleveland Browns	8	4	0	.667	7–3	310	213	L1
Philadelphia Eagles	7	5	0	.583	6–4	252	271	L1
New York Giants	7	5	0	.583	5–4	234	231	W1
Pittsburgh Steelers	5	7	0	.417	4–5	300	273	L1
Chicago Cardinals	4	8	0	.333	3–7	172	221	L2
Washington Redskins	4	8	0	.333	4–6	240	287	W2

Note: Tie games were not officially counted in the standings until 1972.

== NFL Championship Game ==
Round	Date	Opponent	Result	Record	Venue	Attendance	Recap
Championship	December 28	Detroit Lions	L 7–17	0–1	Cleveland Municipal Stadium	50,934	Recap

== Roster and coaching staff ==
1951 Cleveland Browns roster
Quarterbacks: 14 Otto Graham; 16 George Ratterman; Running backs: 22 Rex Bumgardner CB; 20 Ken Carpenter; 32 Chick Jagade OLB; 40 Dub Jones; 36 Marion Motley MLB; 26 Ray Renfro; Receivers: 83 Pete Brewster; 84 Horace Gillom P/DE; 86 Dante Lavelli; 88 Mac Speedie	Offensive linemen: 52 Frank Gatski C; 64 Abe Gibron G/T; 76 Lou Groza T/K; 62 Lin Houston G; 72 Derrell Palmer T/DT; 78 John Sandusky T; 68 Ed Sharkey G; 65 Joe Skibinski G; Defensive linemen: 80 Len Ford DE; 74 Bob Gain DT/K; 79 Jerry Helluin DT; 70 John Kissell DT; 60 Bill Willis MG; 82 George Young DE	Linebackers: 20 Hal Herring OLB; 34 Walt Michaels OLB; 23 Tommy Thompson MLB/C; Defensive backs: 42 Tommy James CB; 24 Warren Lahr CB; 15 Bert Rechichar S; 44 Don Shula CB/S	Reserve list: -- Ken Gorgal S (Military); 44 Sherman Howard RB (IR); -- Art Spinney WR (Military); -- Carl Taseff RB (Military); Head Coach: Paul Brown; Assistants: Howard Brinker (Ends); Blanton Collier (Backfield); Weeb Ewbank (Tackles); Fritz Heisler (Guards); rookies in italics
