= Green Bay Packers home games in Milwaukee =

Though the city currently has no National Football League (NFL) team, Milwaukee is considered a home market for the Green Bay Packers. The team split its home schedule between Green Bay and Milwaukee from 1933 through 1994, with the majority of the Milwaukee games at County Stadium.

The Packers played games in Milwaukee to attract more fans and revenue while the team's then-official home, City Stadium at East High School, remained inadequate compared to other NFL venues. Threats by the league to relocate the Packers permanently to Milwaukee caused the team to replace it with a new City Stadium in 1957, which was renamed Lambeau Field in 1965. The Packers regularly renovated and enlarged the venue and by 1995, expansions to Lambeau Field combined with changing league economics made it feasible for the team to remain in Green Bay full time.

The 1939 Championship between the Packers and the New York Giants was played at State Fair Park, currently known as the Milwaukee Mile. The Packers won in a 27–0 shutout. A 1931 championship against the Portsmouth Spartans was also scheduled for Milwaukee, but was called off. The Packers' final post-season game in Milwaukee was the 1967 Western Conference championship game against the Los Angeles Rams, which the Packers won 28–7. They went on to capture their last NFL Championship (Ice Bowl) and Super Bowl victory under head coach Vince Lombardi.

Reflecting their time in Milwaukee, the Packers maintain two separate season ticket plans: Gold package holders, made up largely of former Milwaukee season ticket holders, have a three-game package consisting of the annual Midwest Shrine preseason contest plus the second and fifth regular-season home games each year; Green package holders (made up of original Green Bay ticket holders) attend the annual Bishop's Charities preseason game and the remaining six of the first eight regular-season contests. The ninth regular season home game (hosted by National Football Conference teams in even numbered seasons only) is alternated between Green and Gold package holders. Green package holders have right of first refusal to playoff tickets, followed by Gold package holders, who otherwise have priority to purchase tickets elsewhere in Lambeau Field if their usual seats are unavailable.

== History ==
Although City Stadium in Green Bay was the Packers' official home field, starting in 1933, they began to play some of their home games in Milwaukee to attract more fans and revenue. After hosting one game at Borchert Field in 1933, the Packers played two or three home games each year in Milwaukee, at Wisconsin State Fair Park from 1934 to 1951, Marquette Stadium in 1952, and Milwaukee County Stadium from 1953–1994. Since then, the Packers have played all home games in Green Bay permanently.

A quarter-mile dirt track formerly located in the infield of the Milwaukee Mile racetrack at the state fairgrounds was also used as a football stadium, informally known as the "Dairy Bowl". It hosted the Green Bay Packers from 1934 through 1951, including the NFL championship game in 1939, a 27–0 shutout of the New York Giants on December 10 to secure a fifth league title.

Marquette Stadium hosted three games during the 1952 season; Packers games in Milwaukee were moved to nearby County Stadium when it opened in 1953.

During this period, the issue of a new stadium in Green Bay began to surface. City Stadium was an inadequate facility, seating only 25,000. Players also had to use the locker rooms at the local high school. The Packers' status in Green Bay became unstable. With City Stadium greatly outdated, and more and more opponents asking for their games against the Packers to be played in Milwaukee, the NFL required the Packers to build a new stadium if they wanted to stay in Green Bay. The Packers and the city of Green Bay complied, building a brand-new 32,000-seat stadium, naming it New City Stadium (currently known as Lambeau Field). The new stadium was dedicated in a 1957 game against the Chicago Bears, with many celebrities attending, including actor James Arness, NFL commissioner Bert Bell, vice president (and future U.S. president) Richard Nixon, and Bears coach George Halas. The Packers won the game, 21–17, but finished the season 3–9.

The Packers played two to four home games per year at Milwaukee County Stadium from 1953 to 1994, Milwaukee County Stadium hosted at least one pre-season game annually during this time as well (except 1983), including the Upper Midwest Shrine Game. By 1995, multiple renovations to Lambeau Field made it more lucrative for the Packers to play their full home slate in Green Bay again for the first time since 1932. Former Milwaukee ticket holders were offered tickets at Lambeau to one pre-season game and the second and fifth home games of the regular season schedule, in what is referred to as the "Gold package." Meanwhile, the "Green package" (for the original Green Bay ticket holders) consisted of the other preseason home game and the six remaining regular season home games. This ticket package arrangement was presented by team president Bob Harlan, and of all the Milwaukee ticket holders that were offered the "Gold" package, 97% of them accepted. Harlan considered the package a thank you to Milwaukee and their fans. As Harlan reasoned, "These fans, their parents, and their grandparents, supported and kept this franchise alive for over 60 years. This team couldn't have existed without Milwaukee."

Milwaukee County Stadium was partly responsible for Lambeau Field's existence, as it was not only intended to lure an MLB team to Milwaukee (which it successfully did in when the Boston Braves moved to Milwaukee from 1953 to 1965 before moving again to Atlanta; and again in 1970, when the Seattle Pilots moved to Milwaukee and became the Brewers), but also to lure the Packers to Milwaukee full-time. As originally constructed, Milwaukee County Stadium was double the size of the Packers' then-home, New City Stadium.

The Minnesota Vikings (15 times) were the Packers' most frequent foe at Milwaukee County Stadium, as the Packers would traditionally host at least one divisional rival from the NFC Central in Milwaukee each season. Only once, however, did the Packers play the Chicago Bears, their primary rivals, in a regular-season game in Milwaukee, defeating the Bears 20–3 in 1974. On November 26, 1989, a Milwaukee County Stadium record crowd of 55,592 saw the Packers beat the Vikings, 20–19. The Packers' final game in Milwaukee was a 21–17 victory over the Atlanta Falcons on December 18, 1994; with 14 seconds left, the winning 9-yard touchdown run was scored by quarterback Brett Favre. Despite no longer playing games in the city, the Packers flagship newspaper and radio remained the Milwaukee Journal Sentinel and Milwaukee-based WTMJ-AM, respectively, until the Packers ended their broadcast agreement with WTMJ in 2022, ending a 93-year broadcast relationship. The Milwaukee Journal Sentinel still remains the Packers' flagship newspaper.

The Packers hosted one NFL playoff game at Milwaukee County Stadium, in 1967, defeating the Los Angeles Rams 28–7 in the Western Conference championship game. It was the first year that the NFL playoffs expanded to four teams, and Green Bay had home field advantage for both rounds, then awarded by rotation. Each subsequent playoff game has been played at Lambeau Field.

Following the unsuccessful effort to lure the Packers to Milwaukee full-time, in 1965 city officials tried to lure an American Football League (AFL) expansion team to play at Milwaukee County Stadium, but Packers head coach Vince Lombardi invoked the team's exclusive lease as well as sign an extension to keep some home games in Milwaukee through 1976. Nonetheless, city officials still pursued an AFL franchise, possibly to play at Marquette Stadium, but the AFL–NFL merger effectively quashed any chances of Milwaukee landing its own team.

Milwaukee County Stadium was built primarily for baseball, creating issues for football games. The playing surface was just barely large enough to fit a football field, which ran parallel with the first base line. The south end zone extended onto the warning track in right field, while the north end zone extended into foul territory on the third-base side. Both teams occupied the east sideline on the outfield side, separated by a piece of tape, to give the majority of seats an unobstructed view. At its height, it seated less than 56,000 for football—just over the NFL's minimum seating capacity—and many seats had obstructed views or were far from the field. Over the years, upgrades and seat expansion primarily benefited Milwaukee's baseball teams.

== Home television stations ==
During WISN, channel 12's time with CBS, it served as the default home station for the NFL's Green Bay Packers for the Milwaukee market, and airing the team's first two Super Bowl appearances (also the first two Super Bowl games in NFL history); it was succeeded and preceded in this stead by WITI.

In early 1994, WITI 6 was named as the market's new Fox affiliate as a result of a deal between the station's owner New World Communications and Fox as part of the network's decision to upgrade affiliates in certain markets after it acquired the broadcast rights to the National Football Conference of the NFL. For a short time between September and November 1994, WCGV carried Green Bay Packers games in the market through the network's NFC package as a lame-duck affiliate, though without any pre-game programming, the only break in network coverage by WITI of the team since the 1977 affiliation switch between WISN and WITI, which took place in the off-season.

== See also ==
- List of Green Bay Packers stadiums
