= Marquette Stadium =

Stadium in Milwaukee, Wisconsin, US

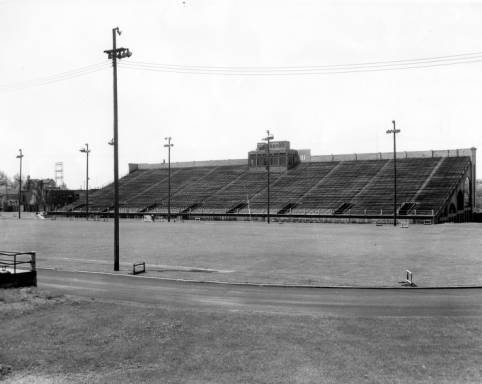
- Marquette Stadium in 1925

- Location in the United States Location in Wisconsin
- Interactive map of Marquette Stadium
- Address: N. 36th & W. Clybourn St.
- Location: Milwaukee, Wisconsin, U.S.
- Coordinates: 43°02′09″N 87°57′39″W
- Owner: Marquette University
- Operator: Marquette University
- Capacity: 20,000 to 30,000
- Surface: Natural grass

Construction
- Opened: 1924
- Demolished: 1976
- Cost: $175,000 ($3.29 million in 2025)

Tenants
- Marquette Golden Avalanche (1924–60); Green Bay Packers (1952); Marquette University High School (1960–74); Milwaukee Panthers (1973–74)

Marquette Stadium was an outdoor athletic stadium in Milwaukee, Wisconsin, United States. Opened in 1924, the stadium hosted Marquette University sports programs, including the Golden Avalanche football team and the university's track and field team. It had a seating capacity of 24,000, which could be expanded to 30,000 with temporary bleachers. Marquette Stadium hosted the National Football League's (NFL) Green Bay Packers for three games during the 1952 season. Starting in 1933, the Packers split their home games between Green Bay, Wisconsin, and Milwaukee, using Wisconsin State Fair Park until 1951. Milwaukee County Stadium was not complete in time for the 1952 season, so the Packers played one season at Marquette Stadium.

In 1960, Marquette discontinued its football program, citing financial challenges. The stadium continued to be used for collegiate athletic events, although the bleachers were demolished in 1976. In 1998, the land was sold to Marquette University High School, who then developed it into athletic fields called Quad Park. Quad Park hosts soccer and track and field, among other sports.

== History ==
=== Construction ===
Demand for a stadium at Marquette University grew in the early 1920s. A student-led campaign to construct a stadium started by at least 1922 and was renewed in March 1923 after the purchase of eight acres of property at Milwaukee's circus grounds by alumni for $40,000 ($755,859 in 2025). The student campaign was tasked with raising $30,000 ($566,895 in 2025) as their share of the purchase of the property. By January 1924, the purchase was finalized and Judge Michael S. Sheridan was identified to lead a campaign to raise funds for the construction of the stadium, which at the time was projected to have a capacity of 65,000. The groundbreaking for the stadium occurred in May 1924; seating capacity was reduced to a projected 50,000, although the initial concrete grandstand would only hold 20,000. This first section cost $175,000 ($3.29 million in 2025) and included the playing field, a practice field, seating, locker rooms, ticket booths, and other support facilities. At its completion, it was still expected to be expanded to a full build out of 50,000 seats.

=== College and high school use ===
The stadium was formally dedicated on October 18, 1924. Marquette hosted John Carroll College for a football game, with Marquette winning 10–3. The stadium would host the Golden Avalanche football team for 36 years until the program was cancelled by the school due to financial concerns. The university also utilized the stadium for other athletic competitions, including track and field and soccer.

In track and field, the stadium hosted a notable match-up between two future United States Olympians: Ralph Metcalfe and Jesse Owens. In a 1934 Amateur Athletic Union (AAU) meet, Metcalfe beat Owens in the 100 yard dash, while Owens beat Metcalfe in the long jump. Owens and Metcalfe both were chosen for the 1936 United States Olympic team and competed in Berlin.

After Marquette cancelled its football program, Marquette University High School used the stadium for football games until the end of 1974. In addition to hosting Marquette University High School, the stadium also was the location of a game between Milwaukee Pulaski High School and Bay View High School that was notable due to its large crowd size of about 19,500 fans. In 1951, Marquette conferred an honorary doctoral degree to General Douglass MacArthur, who was born in Milwaukee. Thousands of people gathered to witness MacArthur's visit, while about 22,000 people attended the conferment ceremony in Marquette Stadium.

By the late 1960s, the stadium was criticized for being in poor condition as it hosted high school football games. The Milwaukee Panthers football team used the stadium for its home games in at least 1973 and 1974. In September 1976, it was announced that the grandstand was demolished due to its age, vandalism, and other security challenges. The field was retained, and continued to be used during the demolition process, which lasted through to 1977. Following the demolition, the site remained in use by both the college and the high school for track and field, soccer, and intramural sports.

=== Green Bay Packers ===
The NFL's Green Bay Packers began splitting their home games between Green Bay, Wisconsin, and Milwaukee in 1933, first playing at Wisconsin State Fair Park. Milwaukee County Stadium was originally conceived as a baseball facility for Milwaukee's Minor League Baseball team, but became home to the Milwaukee Braves when they moved from Boston. During the facility's construction in 1952, the Green Bay Press-Gazette noted that team officials were hopeful the stadium would be finished in time for the upcoming 1952 NFL season. However, the stadium was not ready in time, while Wisconsin State Fair Park was not available because some bleachers had been removed. As an emergency solution, the Packers were provided Marquette Stadium to play their Milwaukee home games. The Packers had played at least one game at Marquette Stadium before; in 1942, they played an exhibition game against a United States Army all-star team.

The Packers played three regular season games at Marquette that season, winning two and losing one; there also was one exhibition match played prior to the start of the season. Attendance peaked at about 21,000 in their loss against the Los Angeles Rams. Two of the games were notable: the Packers' victory against the Redskins came against former Packers co-founder and head coach Curly Lambeau, while their loss against the Rams saw them blow a 28–6 lead in the final 12 minutes of the game. Starting in 1953, the Packers played a few home games a year at Milwaukee County Stadium until 1994, when they moved all their home games back to Lambeau Field in Green Bay.

== Refurbishment ==
In 1998, the property was sold by Marquette to Marquette University High School, which is located a few blocks from the site. The site was redeveloped into a track and field and soccer complex called Quad Park, which support the high school's athletic programs. The current field is slightly west of the original that was within Marquette Stadium. The Quad has hosted Wisconsin Interscholastic Athletic Association (WIAA) sporting events.

== See also ==
- List of Green Bay Packers stadiums
- Green Bay Packers home games in Milwaukee

| Preceded by State Fair Park | Milwaukee Home of the Green Bay Packers; 1952 | Succeeded by County Stadium |
