= 1952 NFL season =

American football season

Regular season
- Duration: September 28 – December 14, 1952
- American Conf. Champions: Cleveland Browns
- National Conf. Champions: Detroit Lions (playoff)

Championship Game
- Champions: Detroit Lions

NFL teams: National, American

The 1952 NFL season was the 33rd regular season of the National Football League. Prior to the season, New York Yanks owner Ted Collins sold his team back to the NFL. A few days later, an ownership group in Dallas, Texas, purchased the Yanks from the NFL, relocated them to Dallas, Texas, and renamed them the Dallas Texans.

However, the new Dallas Texans went 1–11, and were sold back to the league midway through the season. For the team's last five games, the league operated the Texans as a road team, becoming the final traveling team to date in NFL history, using Hershey, Pennsylvania, as a home base. One of their final two "home" games were held at the Rubber Bowl in Akron, Ohio, the other one played at Briggs Stadium in Detroit, Michigan. After the season ended, the Texans folded, becoming the final NFL team to do so, however, all of the 1952 Dallas Texans players and assets were given to Carroll Rosenbloom for the following year, becoming the expansion Baltimore Colts, choosing the blue and white color scheme worn by the Texans, and the assets of the Dayton Triangles franchise ultimately never missing a season in some form. This left Dallas without a professional football franchise until the births of the NFL Dallas Cowboys and the AFL version of the Dallas Texans in 1960.

The Detroit Lions defeated the Cleveland Browns in the NFL Championship Game.

This was the last NFL season prior to the introduction of regular season overtime in 1974 that there were no ties in the regular season.

== Draft ==
The 1952 NFL draft was held on January 17, 1952, at Philadelphia's Hotel Statler. With the first pick, the Los Angeles Rams selected quarterback Bill Wade from Vanderbilt University.

== Major rule changes ==
- Offensive players will not be called for illegal motion as long as they do not move forward prior to the snap.
- The penalty for offensive pass interference is 15 yards from the previous spot, unless the result on a fourth-down play is a touchback.
- A player who commits a palpably (obviously) unfair act is ejected from the game.

== Regular season ==
=== Highlights ===
- In Week One (September 28), the Cleveland Browns hosted a rematch of their 1951 title game loss to the Rams, which had taken place in Los Angeles. That 24–17 loss was avenged with a 37–7 win for the Browns. The original Dallas Texans played their first game after their relocation from New York where they had been the New York Yanks/Bulldogs from 1949-1951, but a crowd of only 17,499 turned out to watch the visiting Giants. The Texans scored first, on a pass from George Taliaferro to Buddy Young, two of the few African American players in the NFL at that time. The Giants scored the rest of the points in a 24–6 win.
- Week Three (October 12) the Giants beat the Browns 17–9, and the 49ers shut out the Lions 28–0, as both stayed unbeaten on the road.
- Week Four (October 19) saw the 49ers stay unbeaten with a 40–18 win over the Bears, while the Chicago Cardinals spoiled the Giants' home opener, 24–23.
- San Francisco's streak finally ended on November 2 in Week Six when the Bears visited. The 49ers were leading, 17–10 in the 4th quarter, when Frankie Albert made an unnecessary gamble in a 4th and 4 on his own 31-yard line, trying to gain yardage on a fake punt. Chicago took over on downs and tied the game three plays later, and George Blanda's 48-yard field goal gave them a 20–17 win.
- In Week Seven (November 9), the 49ers lost in New York, 23–14, while Detroit beat Pittsburgh 31–6 and Cleveland beat the Cardinals 28–13. Both division races were tied, with the Giants and Browns in the American, and the Lions joining the 49ers in the National, all with 5–2–0 records. In Dallas, only 10,000 turned out in a drizzle to watch the Texans fall to 0–7–0 in a 27–6 loss to the Rams. It proved to be the Texans' last Cotton Bowl date, and the last pro football game played in the state of Texas until 1960. After losses of $250,000 and failed attempts to get refinancing, the team's 16 stockholders surrendered the franchise three days later, the league took over its operations, and the remaining games in Dallas were moved.
- In Week Eight (November 16) the Browns had a 22–0 lead over Pittsburgh and then withstood a four-touchdown passing attack by Jim Finks in a 29–28 win. A safety, caused when Finks had been sacked in the end zone earlier, was the margin of victory. With the Giants' 17–3 loss to Green Bay, Cleveland took over first place in the American Division. Meanwhile, Detroit and San Francisco both won to stay tied in the National.
- Week Nine (November 23) saw a seven-way tie for the NFL's best record, with more than half of the teams at 6–3–0, and only three games left in the season. The 5–3 Rams beat the 6–2 49ers 35–9, and the 5–3 Eagles beat the 6–2 Browns 28–20. The 3–5 Bears upset the visiting 6–2 Lions, 24–23, after George Blanda passed to Ed Sprinkle with 8 seconds to play. In addition, the 5–3 Giants and the 5–3 Packers won their games against Washington (14–10) and Dallas (42–14) respectively.
- This oddity only lasted a few days. Week Ten began on Thanksgiving Day, as the Lions beat the Packers 48–24. The same day, November 27, the 0–9–0 Texans played the Bears in Akron, Ohio after Dallas and Chicago were both unavailable. The Texans blew an 18-point lead, but with 0:34 to play, Frank Tripucka scored and the NFL's orphaned team registered its only win, 27–23. About 3,000 Ohioans watched the game, compared to 14,800 who packed the stadium earlier that day to watch a high school game. On November 30, the Rams and 49ers, both 6–3–0, met for the second straight week, this time in San Francisco, and the L.A. team won 34–21. The NFL's two other 6–3 teams, the Eagles and the Giants, both lost on the road. The Cards beat Philly 28–22. The 3–6 Steelers, however, handed the Giants their worst defeat ever, beginning with a 91-yard return of the opening kickoff by Lynn Chandnois and ending 63–7. With that, the Browns were alone in the American race, while the Lions and Rams were tied in the National.
- The Browns, Lions and Rams won again in Week Eleven, as did Philadelphia, but the Giants were eliminated with a 27–17 loss to Washington.
- In the final games of the regular season (December 14) in Week Twelve, Detroit won 41–6 in the final game for the original Dallas Texans, and the Rams beat Pittsburgh 28–14, tying both for the National Division title at 9–3–0, and forcing a playoff. In the American Division, the 7–4 Eagles were hoping for the 8–3 Browns to lose, and Cleveland fell in New York, 37–34, despite a fourth quarter comeback attempt. Playing against the last place (2–8) Redskins, the Eagles had a 21–14 lead in the fourth quarter, but Eddie LeBaron crossed the goal line with 0:18 to play, for Washington's only home win in 1952, and handing the Browns the division title.

=== Division races ===
Week	National		American	
1	Tie (Bears, S.F)	1–0–0	4 teams (Cle, NYG, Phi, Was)	1–0–0
2	San Francisco 49ers	2–0–0	Tie (Cle, NYG)	2–0–0
3	San Francisco 49ers	3–0–0	New York Giants	3–0–0
4	San Francisco 49ers	4–0–0	3 teams (Cards, Cle., NYG)	3–1–0
5	San Francisco 49ers	5–0–0	Cleveland Browns	4–1–0
6	San Francisco 49ers	5–1–0	Cleveland Browns	4–2–0
7	Tie (Lions, 49ers)	5–2–0	Tie (Browns, Giants)	5–2–0
8	Tie (Lions, 49ers)	6–2–0	Cleveland Browns	6–2–0
9	4 teams (Det., GB, LA, SF)	6–3–0	3 teams (Cle., NYG, Phi)	6–3–0
10	Tie (Det., LA)	7–3–0	Cleveland Browns	7–3–0
11	Tie (Det., LA)	8–3–0	Cleveland Browns	8–3–0
12	(tie) Detroit Lions	9–3–0	Cleveland Browns	8–4–0
12	Los Angeles Rams	9–3–0		

== Final standings ==
NFL American Conference
	W	L	T	PCT	CONF	PF	PA	STK
Cleveland Browns	8	4	0	.667	7–3	310	213	L1
Philadelphia Eagles	7	5	0	.583	6–4	252	271	L1
New York Giants	7	5	0	.583	5–4	234	231	W1
Pittsburgh Steelers	5	7	0	.417	4–5	300	273	L1
Chicago Cardinals	4	8	0	.333	3–7	172	221	L2
Washington Redskins	4	8	0	.333	4–6	240	287	W2

Note: Tie games were not officially counted in the standings until 1972.

NFL National Conference
	W	L	T	PCT	CONF	PF	PA	STK
Detroit Lions	9	3	0	.750	7–3	344	192	W3
Los Angeles Rams	9	3	0	.750	8–2	349	234	W8
San Francisco 49ers	7	5	0	.583	6–3	285	221	W1
Green Bay Packers	6	6	0	.500	3–6	295	312	L3
Chicago Bears	5	7	0	.417	4–6	245	326	W1
Dallas Texans	1	11	0	.083	1–9	182	427	L2

== Playoffs ==
The Lions hosted and won the National Division playoff. The Browns hosted the NFL Championship Game but were defeated by the Lions.

National Division playoff			NFL Championship
			A	Cleveland	7
N	Los Angeles	21	N	Detroit	17
N	Detroit	31

== League leaders ==
Statistic	Name	Team	Yards
Passing	Otto Graham	Cleveland	2816
Rushing	Dan Towler	Los Angeles	894
Receiving	Billy Howton	Green Bay	1231

== Coaching changes ==
=== Offseason ===
- Chicago Cardinals: Joe Kuharich became the new Cardinals head coach. Curly Lambeau resigned after 10 games into 1951. Phil Handler and Cecil Isbell then served as co-head coaches for the final two games of the 1951 season.
- Dallas Texans: The team retained the services of their head coach James Phelan when they relocated from New York to Dallas.
- Philadelphia Eagles: Jim Trimble became the new head coach. Bo McMillin retired after two games into 1951 after he was diagnosed with terminal stomach cancer. Wayne Millner served as interim for the rest of that season.
- Pittsburgh Steelers: John Michelosen was replaced by Joe Bach.
- Washington Redskins: Curly Lambeau became the new head coach. Herman Ball was fired after three games into 1951. Dick Todd served as interim for the rest of the season.

=== In-season ===
- Los Angeles Rams: Joe Stydahar resigned after one game into the season and was replaced by Hamp Pool.

== Stadium changes ==
- The Dallas Texans played their first four regular season home games at the Cotton Bowl in Dallas, their fifth home game at the Rubber Bowl in Akron, Ohio, and their sixth and last home game at the Detroit Lions' Briggs Stadium in Detroit, Michigan.
- The Green Bay Packers home games in Milwaukee moved from Wisconsin State Fair Park to Marquette Stadium.
