= List of NFL team records =

This is a list of records set by various teams in various categories in the National Football League (NFL).

== Championships ==
- Most Super Bowl wins, 6

Pittsburgh Steelers 1974–75, 1978–79, 2005, 2008
New England Patriots 2001, 2003–04, 2014, 2016, 2018

- Most consecutive Super Bowl wins, 2

Green Bay Packers 1966–67
Miami Dolphins 1972–73
Pittsburgh Steelers 1974–75, 1978–79
San Francisco 49ers 1988–89
Dallas Cowboys 1992–93
Denver Broncos 1997–98
New England Patriots 2003–04
Kansas City Chiefs 2022–23

- Most Super Bowl appearances, 12

New England Patriots 1985, 1996, 2001, 2003–04, 2007, 2011, 2014, 2016–18, 2025

- Most consecutive Super Bowl appearances, 4

Buffalo Bills 1990–93

- Most league championships, 13

Green Bay Packers 1929–31, 1936, 1939, 1944, 1961–62, 1965–67, 1996, 2010

- Most consecutive league championships, 3

Green Bay Packers 1929–31, 1965–67

- Most league championship game appearances, 19

New York Giants 1933–35, 1938–39, 1941, 1944, 1946, 1956, 1958–59, 1961–63, 1986, 1990, 2000, 2007, 2011

- Most consecutive league championship game appearances, 6

Cleveland Browns 1950–55

- Most conference championship game appearances, 19

San Francisco 49ers 1970–71, 1981, 1983–84, 1988–90, 1992–94, 1997, 2011–13, 2019, 2021–23

- Most consecutive conference championship game appearances, 8

New England Patriots 2011–18

== Games won ==
- Highest winning percentage for regular season, .571 (819–611–39)

Green Bay Packers 1921–2025

- Highest winning percentage for regular season and postseason combined, .586 (856–639–38)

Green Bay Packers 1921–2025

- Most games won (regular season only), franchise history, 819

Green Bay Packers 1921–2025

- Most games won (including playoffs), franchise history, 856

Green Bay Packers 1920–2025

- Most games won (regular season only), since 1970 merger, 534

Pittsburgh Steelers: 1970–2025

- Most games won (including playoffs), since 1970 merger, 570

Pittsburgh Steelers: 1970–2025

- Most consecutive winning seasons, franchise history, 20

Dallas Cowboys: 1965–1985

== Losses ==
- Lowest all-time winning percentage for regular season, current franchises, .412 (326–466–1)

Tampa Bay Buccaneers, 1976–2024

- Lowest all-time winning percentage for postseason, .364 (12–21)

Los Angeles Chargers, 1960–2025

- Lowest all-time winning percentage, combined regular season and postseason, .414 (338–479–1)

Tampa Bay Buccaneers, 1976–2025

- Longest losing streak, multiple seasons, 26 games

Tampa Bay Buccaneers: 1976–1977

== Tie games ==
- Most ties in a season, 6

Chicago Bears: 1932

- Most consecutive ties, 3

Chicago Bears: 1932

- Most ties all-time, 42

Chicago Bears: 1920–2025

== Scoring ==
- Most games scoring 50+ points, season, 3

New York Giants: 1950
Los Angeles Rams: 1950
San Diego Chargers: 1963 (including a playoff win)
Dallas Cowboys: 1966
Minnesota Vikings: 1969
Denver Broncos: 2013

- Most points overcome to win game, 33

Minnesota Vikings vs Indianapolis Colts, December 17, 2022 (trailed 0–33, won 39–36, OT)

- Worst point differential, 16-game season, −274

Baltimore Colts: 1981

== Offense ==
=== Yards gained ===
- Most seasons leading league yards gained, 12

Chicago Bears: 1932, 1934–35, 1939, 1941–1944, 1947, 1949, 1955–56

- Most consecutive seasons leading league yards gained, 4

Chicago Bears: 1941–1944
San Diego Chargers: 1980–1983

- Most yards gained, season, 7,474

New Orleans Saints: 2011

- Fewest yards gained, 16-game season, 3,374

Seattle Seahawks: 1992

- Fewest yards gained, season, 1,150

Cincinnati Reds: 1933

- Most yards gained, single team, game, 726

Miami Dolphins vs Denver Broncos, Sep 24, 2023

- Fewest yards gained, single team, game, −7

Seattle Seahawks vs Los Angeles Rams, Nov 4, 1979

- Most yards gained, both teams, game, 1,151

New England Patriots (613) vs Philadelphia Eagles (538), Feb 4, 2018 (Super Bowl LII)

- Fewest yards gained, both teams, game, 30

Chicago Cardinals (14) vs Detroit Lions (16), Sep 15, 1940

- Most consecutive games, 500 or more yards gained, 3

San Diego Chargers: 1982
San Francisco 49ers: 1998
New England Patriots: 2011

- Most consecutive games, 450 or more yards gained, 4

Houston Oilers: 1961
Miami Dolphins: 1984
Kansas City Chiefs: 2004
New England Patriots: 2011

- Most consecutive games, 400 or more yards gained, 11

San Diego Chargers: 1982–83

- Most consecutive games, 350 or more yards gained, 17

New England Patriots : 2011–2012

- Most consecutive games, 300 or more yards gained, 36

Minnesota Vikings: 2002–2004

=== Passing ===
- Most passes attempted, season, 751

Tampa Bay Buccaneers: 2022

- Fewest passes attempted, season, 102

Cincinnati Reds: 1933

- Fewest passes attempted, 12-game season, 187

New York Giants: 1950

- Fewest passes attempted, 14-game season, 205

Chicago Bears: 1972

- Fewest passes attempted, 16-game season, 336

Los Angeles Raiders: 1990

- Most passes attempted, game, 70

New England Patriots vs Minnesota Vikings, Nov 13, 1994

- Fewest passes attempted, game, 0 (zero)

Green Bay Packers vs Portsmouth Spartans, Oct 8, 1933
Detroit Lions vs Cleveland Rams, Sep 10, 1937
Pittsburgh Steelers vs Brooklyn Dodgers, Nov 16, 1941
Pittsburgh Steelers vs Los Angeles Rams, Nov 13, 1949
Cleveland Browns vs Philadelphia Eagles, Dec 3, 1950

- Most passes attempted, both teams, game, 112

New England Patriots (70) vs Minnesota Vikings (42), Nov 13, 1994

- Fewest passes attempted, both teams, game, 4

Chicago Cardinals (1) vs Detroit Lions (3), Nov 3, 1935
Detroit Lions (0) vs Cleveland Rams (4), Sep 10, 1937

- Most passes completed, season, 499

Tampa Bay Buccaneers: 2022

- Fewest passes completed, season, 25

Cincinnati Reds: 1933

- Fewest passes completed, 12-game season, 66

New York Yanks: 1949

- Fewest passes completed, 14-game season, 78

Chicago Bears: 1972

- Fewest passes completed, 16-game season, 151

Tampa Bay Buccaneers: 1978

- Most passes completed, game, 47

Arizona Cardinals vs San Francisco 49ers, Nov 16, 2025

- Fewest passes completed, single team, game, 0

By many NFL teams; last time: Buffalo Bills vs New York Jets, Sep 29, 1974

- Most passes completed, both teams, game, 85

Detroit Lions (41) vs Tennessee Titans (44) (OT), Sep 23, 2012

- Fewest passes completed, both teams, game, 1

Chicago Cardinals (0) vs Philadelphia Eagles (1), Nov 8, 1936
Detroit Lions (0) vs Cleveland Rams (1), Sep 10, 1937
Chicago Cardinals (0) vs Detroit Lions (1), Sep 15, 1940
Brooklyn Dodgers (0) vs Pittsburgh Steelers (1), Nov 29, 1942

- Most seasons leading league, net passing yards, 10

San Diego Chargers: 1965, 1968, 1971, 1978–83, 1985

- Most consecutive seasons leading league, net passing yards, 6

San Diego Chargers: 1978–83

- Most net passing yards gained, season, 5,444

Denver Broncos: 2013

- Fewest net passing yards gained, 14-game season, 997

Buffalo Bills: 1973

- Fewest net passing yards gained, 16-game season, 1,660

Kansas City Chiefs: 1979

- Most net passing yards gained, single team, game, 541

Los Angeles Rams (vs New York Yanks, Sep 28, 1951)

- Fewest net passing yards gained, single team, game, −53

Denver Broncos (vs Oakland Raiders, Sep 10, 1967)

- Most net passing yards gained, both teams, game, 971

Green Bay Packers (469) vs Detroit Lions (502), Jan 1, 2012

- Fewest net passing yards gained, both teams, game, −11

Green Bay Packers (−10) vs Dallas Cowboys (−1), Oct 24, 1965

- Most consecutive games passing for 300+ yards, single team, 8

Indianapolis Colts, 2014

- Most seasons leading league, fewest times sacked, 10

Miami Dolphins: 1973, 1982–90

- Most consecutive seasons leading league, fewest times sacked, 9

Miami Dolphins: 1982–90

- Most times sacked, season, 104

Philadelphia Eagles: 1986

- Fewest times sacked, season, 7

Miami Dolphins: 1988

- Most times sacked, single team, game, 12

Pittsburgh Steelers (vs Dallas Cowboys, Nov 20, 1966)
Baltimore Colts (vs St. Louis Cardinals, Oct 26, 1980)
Detroit Lions (vs Chicago Bears, Dec 16, 1984)
Houston Oilers (vs Dallas Cowboys, Sep 29, 1985)
Philadelphia Eagles (vs New York Giants, Sep 30, 2007)

- Most times sacked, both teams, game, 18

Green Bay Packers (10) vs San Diego Chargers (8), Sep 24, 1978

- Most seasons leading league, in completion percentage, 14

San Francisco 49ers: 1952, 1957–58, 1965, 1981, 1983, 1987, 1989, 1992–97

- Most consecutive seasons leading league, completion percentage, 6

San Francisco 49ers: 1992–97

- Highest completion percentage, season, 71.3

New Orleans Saints (662 attempts, 472 completions): 2011

- Highest completion percentage, game, 96.7

Tennessee Titans (22 completions, 23 attempts) vs Houston Texans, Nov 26, 2018

- Lowest completion percentage, season, 22.9

Philadelphia Eagles (170–39) 1936

- Most touchdowns passing, season, 55

Denver Broncos: 2013

- Fewest touchdowns, passing, season, 0 (zero)

Cincinnati Reds: 1933
Pittsburgh Steelers: 1945

- Fewest touchdowns, passing, 14-game season, 3

Tampa Bay Buccaneers: 1977

- Fewest touchdowns, passing, 16-game season, 5

Tampa Bay Buccaneers: 1995

- Most touchdowns, passing, single team, game, 7

Chicago Bears (vs New York Giants, Nov 14, 1943)
Cleveland Browns (vs Los Angeles Dons, Oct 14, 1949)
Philadelphia Eagles (vs Washington Redskins, Oct 17, 1954)
Houston Oilers (vs New York Titans, Nov 19, 1961)
Houston Oilers (vs New York Titans, Oct 14, 1962)
New York Giants (vs Washington Redskins, Oct 28, 1962)
Minnesota Vikings (vs Baltimore Colts, Sep 28, 1969)
San Diego Chargers (vs Oakland Raiders, Nov 22, 1981)
Denver Broncos (vs Baltimore Ravens, Sep 5, 2013)
Philadelphia Eagles (vs Oakland Raiders, Nov 3, 2013)
New Orleans Saints (vs New York Giants, Nov 1, 2015)

- Most touchdowns, passing, both teams, game, 13

New Orleans Saints (7) vs New York Giants (6), Nov 1, 2015

- Most consecutive games, one or more passing touchdowns, 54

New Orleans Saints October 18, 2009–November 25, 2012

- Most consecutive games, no passing touchdowns, 10

Brooklyn Dodgers November 1, 1942–October 17, 1943

- Most consecutive games, no passing touchdowns, current franchises, 9

Pittsburgh Steelers October 7, 1945–December 2, 1945

- Most consecutive games, no passing touchdowns, since 1950, 8

Tampa Bay Buccaneers October 1, 1995–November 26, 1995

- Most interceptions thrown, team, season, 48

Houston Oilers: 1962

- Most interceptions returned for touchdowns by opponents, season, 8

Miami Dolphins: 2004

- Fewest interceptions thrown, team, season, 2

New England Patriots: 2016

- Most interceptions thrown, single team, game, 9

Detroit Lions (vs Green Bay Packers, Oct 24, 1943)
Pittsburgh Steelers (vs Philadelphia Eagles, Dec 12, 1965)

- Most interceptions thrown, both teams, game, 13

Denver Broncos (8) vs Houston Oilers (5), Dec 2, 1962

- Most consecutive pass attempts without an interception, 379

Washington Redskins December 2, 2007–November 3, 2008

- Most consecutive pass attempts at home without an interception, 291

New England Patriots December 29, 2002–September 9, 2004

- Consecutive pass attempts on the road without an interception, 446

New England Patriots December 27, 2015–October 5, 2017

- Most consecutive games without allowing an interception returned for a touchdown, 110

Los Angeles Rams October 21, 1973–November 30, 1980

=== Rushing ===
- Most seasons leading league, rushing, 12

Chicago Bears: 1932, 1934–35, 1939–1942, 1951, 1955–56, 1968, 1977, 1983–1986

- Most consecutive seasons leading league, rushing, 4

Chicago Bears (2): 1939–1942, 1983–1986

- Most rushing attempts, season, 681

Oakland Raiders: 1977

- Fewest rushing attempts, season, 211

Philadelphia Eagles: 1982 (9 game, strike-shortened season)

- Fewest rushing attempts, 16-game season, 304

Detroit Lions, 2006

- Most rushing attempts, single team, game, 72

Chicago Bears (vs Brooklyn Dodgers) Oct 20, 1935

- Fewest rushing attempts, single team, game, 5

Tampa Bay Buccaneers (vs New Orleans Saints) Nov 8, 2020

- Most rushing attempts, both teams, game, 108

Chicago Cardinals (70) vs Green Bay Packers (38), Dec 5, 1948

- Fewest rushing attempts, both teams, game, 16

Chicago Cardinals (6) vs Boston Redskins (10), Oct 29, 1933

- Most yards gained rushing, season, 3,296

Baltimore Ravens, 2019

- Fewest yards gained rushing, season, 298

Philadelphia Eagles, 1940

- Fewest yards gained rushing, 14-game season, 978

New York Jets, 1963

- Fewest yards gained rushing, 16-game season, 1,062

San Diego Chargers, 2000

- Most yards gained rushing, single team, game, 426

Detroit Lions (vs Pittsburgh Pirates) Nov 4, 1934

- Most yards gained rushing, single team, game, since 1951, 407

Cincinnati Bengals (vs Denver Broncos) Oct 22, 2000

- Fewest yards gained rushing, single team, game, −53

Detroit Lions (vs Chicago Cardinals) Oct 17, 1943

- Most yards gained rushing, both teams, game, 595

Los Angeles Rams (371) vs New York Yanks (224), Nov 18, 1951

- Fewest yards gained rushing, both teams, game, −15

Detroit Lions (−53) vs Chicago Cardinals (38) Oct 17, 1943

- Highest average gain, rushing, season, 5.74

Cleveland Browns, 1963

- Lowest average gain, rushing, season, 0.94

Philadelphia Eagles, 1940

- Most touchdowns, rushing, season, 36

Green Bay Packers, 1962

- Fewest touchdowns, rushing, season, 1

Brooklyn Dodgers, 1934

- Fewest touchdowns, rushing, 16-game season, 2

New York Jets, 1995
Arizona Cardinals, 2005

- Most touchdowns, rushing, both teams, game, 9

Rock Island Independents (9) vs Evansville Crimson Giants (0) Oct 15, 1922
Racine Legion (9) vs Louisville Brecks (0), Nov 5, 1922

- Most touchdowns, rushing, both teams, game, since 1940, 9

Baltimore Ravens vs Cleveland Browns, Dec 14, 2020
Minnesota Vikings vs New Orleans Saints, Dec 25, 2020

- Most consecutive games, one or more rushing touchdowns, 24

San Diego Chargers December 21, 2003 – October 16, 2005

- Most consecutive games, no rushing touchdowns, 13

San Diego Chargers October 15, 2012 – September 15, 2013

=== First downs ===
- Most seasons leading league, first downs, 9

Chicago Bears: 1935, 1939, 1941, 1943, 1945, 1947–1949, 1955

- Most consecutive seasons leading league first downs, 4

San Diego Chargers: 1980–1983

- Most first downs, season, 444

New England Patriots: 2012

- Fewest first downs, 16-game season, 176

Cleveland Browns: 2000

- Fewest first downs, season, 51

Cincinnati Reds: 1933

- Most first downs, single team, game, regulation time, 40

New Orleans Saints (vs Dallas Cowboys) Nov 10, 2013

- Fewest first downs, single team, game, 0 (zero)

New York Giants (vs Green Bay Packers) Oct 1, 1933
Pittsburgh Pirates (vs Boston Redskins) Oct 29, 1933
Philadelphia Eagles (vs Detroit Lions) Sep 20, 1935
New York Giants (vs Washington Redskins) Sep 27, 1942
Denver Broncos (vs Houston Oilers) Sep 3, 1966

- Most first downs, both teams, game, 64

Kansas City Chiefs (32) vs Seattle Seahawks (32), Nov 24, 2002

- Fewest first downs, both teams, game, 7

Chicago Cardinals (2) vs Detroit Lions (5), Sep 15, 1940

- Most first downs, rushing, season, 181

New England Patriots: 1978

- Fewest first downs, rushing, season, 36

Cleveland Rams: 1942
Boston Yanks: 1944

- Most first downs, rushing, game, 25

Philadelphia Eagles vs Washington Redskins, Dec 2, 1951

- Fewest first downs, rushing, single team, game, 0 (zero)

Several Teams; Last Time: Carolina Panthers (vs San Diego Chargers) Dec 17, 2000

- Most first downs, rushing, both teams, game, 36

Philadelphia Eagles (25) vs Washington Redskins (11), Dec 2, 1951

- Fewest first downs, rushing, both teams, game, 2

Houston Oilers (0) vs Denver Broncos (2), Dec 2, 1962
New York Jets (1) vs St. Louis Rams (1), Dec 3, 1995
Miami Dolphins (1) vs San Diego Chargers (1), Dec 19, 1999
New Orleans Saints (1) vs Baltimore Ravens (1), Dec 19, 1999

- Most first downs, passing, season, 280

New Orleans Saints: 2011

- Fewest first downs, passing, season,18

Pittsburgh Steelers: 1941

- Most first downs, passing, single team, game, 29

New York Giants (vs Cincinnati Bengals) Oct 13, 1985

- Fewest first downs, passing, single team, game, 0 (zero)

By Several Teams; Last Time: Cleveland Browns (vs Jacksonville Jaguars) Dec 3, 2000

- Most first downs, passing, both teams, game, 47

Detroit Lions (20) vs Green Bay Packers (27), Jan 1, 2012

- Fewest first downs, passing, both teams, game, 0 (zero)

Brooklyn Dodgers vs Pittsburgh Steelers, Nov 29, 1942

- Most first downs gained, penalty, season, 43

Denver Broncos: 1994

- Fewest first downs, penalty, season, 2

Brooklyn Dodgers: 1940

- Most first downs, penalty, game, 11

Denver Broncos vs Houston Oilers, Oct 6, 1985

- Most first downs, penalty, both teams, game, 13

Baltimore Ravens (5) vs New England Patriots (8), Sep 23, 2012

== Defense ==
=== Points allowed ===
- Most seasons leading league, fewest points allowed, 11

New York Giants: 1927, 1935, 1938–39, 1941, 1958–59, 1961, 1990, 1993

- Most consecutive seasons leading league, fewest points allowed, 5

Cleveland Browns: 1953–1957

- Most consecutive seasons leading league, fewest points allowed (since 1970 merger), 4

Seattle Seahawks: 2012–2015

- Fewest points allowed, season, 7 (Note: The 1920 Akron Pros allowed just 7 points in the 11-game season that ended with them being voted the NFL's first national championship team.)

Akron Pros: 1920

- Fewest points allowed, season (13-game season), 20

New York Giants: 1927

- Fewest points allowed, season (since 1932), 44

Chicago Bears: 1932

- Fewest points allowed, 14-game season, 129

Atlanta Falcons: 1977

- Fewest points allowed, 16-game season, 165

Baltimore Ravens: 2000

- Fewest points allowed on the road, 8 road game season, since 1940, 64

Philadelphia Eagles: 2001

- Fewest points allowed at home, 8 home game season, since 1940, 61

Chicago Bears: 2005

- Fewest points allowed at home, 7 home game season, since 1940, 45

Los Angeles Rams: 1977

- Fewest points allowed at home, 6 home game season, since 1940, 37

New York Giants: 1944

- Most points allowed, season, 534

Carolina Panthers: 2024

- Most points allowed, 14-game season, 501

New York Giants: 1966

- Most points allowed on the road, season (7-game season), 321

New York Giants: 1966

- Most points allowed at home, season, 292

Detroit Lions: 2008

- Most shutouts, season, 10

Pottsville Maroons: 1926
New York Giants: 1927

- Most shutouts, season (since 1940), 5

Pittsburgh Steelers: 1976
New York Giants: 1944

- Fewest points allowed in 1st quarter, season, 3

Los Angeles Rams: 1974

- Fewest points allowed in 1st quarter, 16-game season, 6

Pittsburgh Steelers: 1978

- Fewest points allowed in 2nd quarter, season, 19

Cleveland Browns: 1951

- Fewest points allowed in 2nd quarter, 16-game season, 31

Chicago Bears: 2001

- Fewest points allowed in 3rd quarter, season, 6

Detroit Lions: 1934

- Fewest points allowed in 3rd quarter, 16-game season, 9

Miami Dolphins: 2000

- Fewest points allowed in 4th quarter, season, 7

New York Giants: 1944

- Fewest points allowed in 4th quarter, 16-game season, 26

Denver Broncos: 1978

=== Touchdowns allowed ===
- Fewest touchdowns allowed, season (since 1932), 6

Chicago Bears: 1932
Brooklyn Dodgers: 1933

- Fewest touchdowns allowed, 16-game season, 18

Baltimore Ravens: 2000

- Most touchdowns allowed, season, 68

Baltimore Colts: 1981
Detroit Lions: 2020

- Most consecutive games allowing one or more touchdowns, 133

Denver Broncos September 9, 1960–October 26, 1969

- Most consecutive games without allowing a touchdown, current franchises, 7

Detroit Lions: 1934

- Most consecutive games without allowing a touchdown, since 1935, 5

Pittsburgh Steelers: 1976
Baltimore Ravens: 2000

- Most consecutive quarters without allowing a touchdown, since 1935, 22

Pittsburgh Steelers: 1976

- Fewest touchdowns allowed, 3rd quarter, season, 0

Miami Dolphins: 2000
Detroit Lions: 1934

- Fewest touchdowns allowed, rushing, season, 2

Detroit Lions: 1934
Dallas Cowboys: 1968
Minnesota Vikings: 1971

- Fewest touchdowns allowed, rushing, 16-game season, 3

San Francisco 49ers: 2011

- Most touchdowns allowed, rushing, season, 36

Oakland Raiders: 1961

- Most consecutive games, allowing one or more rushing touchdowns, 27

Chicago Rockets/Chicago Hornets: September 26, 1947 – September 9, 1949

- Most consecutive games, allowing one or more rushing touchdowns, current franchises, 23

Minnesota Vikings: September 17, 1961 – November 11, 1962

- Most consecutive games without allowing a rushing touchdown, 16

Buffalo Bills: October 24, 1964 – October 31, 1965

- Fewest touchdowns allowed, passing, season, 1

Portsmouth Spartans: 1932
Philadelphia Eagles: 1934

- Most touchdowns allowed, passing, national football league, season, 45

New Orleans Saints: 2015

- Fewest touchdowns allowed, passing, 16-game season, 6

Indianapolis Colts: 2008

- Fewest touchdowns allowed, passing, 14-game season, 5

Miami Dolphins: 1973

- Most consecutive games, allowing one or more passing touchdowns, 34

St. Louis Cardinals: December 11, 1983-December 21, 1985

- Most consecutive games without allowing a passing touchdown, 8

Green Bay Packers: December 19, 1971-October 29, 1972
Cleveland Browns: December 26, 1987-October 16, 1988

=== First downs allowed ===
- Fewest first downs allowed season, 77

Detroit Lions: 1935

- Most first downs allowed season, 415

Detroit Lions: 2020

- Fewest first downs allowed, 16-game season, 206

Philadelphia Eagles: 1991

- Fewest first downs allowed, rushing, season, 35

Chicago Bears: 1942

- Most first downs allowed, rushing, season, 179

Detroit Lions: 1985

- Fewest first downs allowed, passing, season, 33

Chicago Bears: 1943

- Most first downs allowed, passing, season, 253

Detroit Lions: 2020
Seattle Seahawks: 2020

- Fewest first downs allowed, penalty, season, 1

Boston Yanks: 1944

- Most first downs allowed, penalty, season, 56

Kansas City Chiefs: 1998

=== Yards allowed ===
- Most seasons leading league, fewest yards allowed, 8

Chicago Bears: 1942–43, 1948, 1958, 1963, 1984–1986

- Most consecutive seasons leading league, fewest yards allowed, 3

Boston/Washington Redskins: 1935–1937
Chicago Bears: 1984–1986

- Fewest yards allowed, season, 1,539

Chicago Cardinals: 1934

- Fewest yards allowed, 14-game season, 2,720

Minnesota Vikings: 1969

- Fewest yards allowed, 16-game season, 3,549

Philadelphia Eagles: 1991

- Most yards allowed, season, 7,042

New Orleans Saints: 2012

- Most yards allowed, 14-game season, 5,593

Minnesota Vikings: 1961

- Most seasons leading league, fewest rushing yards allowed, 11

Chicago Bears: 1937, 1939, 1942, 1946, 1949, 1963, 1984–85, 1987–88, 2018

- Most consecutive seasons leading league, fewest rushing yards allowed, 4

Dallas Cowboys: 1966–1969

- Fewest yards allowed, rushing, season, 519

Chicago Bears: 1942

- Fewest yards allowed, rushing, 14-game season, AFL, 918

Buffalo Bills: 1964

- Fewest yards allowed, rushing, 16-game season, 970

Baltimore Ravens, 2000

- Most yards allowed, rushing, 14-game season, 2,971

Kansas City Chiefs: 1977

- Most yards allowed, rushing, 16-game season, 3,228

Buffalo Bills: 1978

- Most seasons leading league, fewest passing yards allowed, 10

Green Bay Packers: 1947–48, 1962, 1964–1968, 1996, 2005

- Most consecutive seasons leading league, fewest passing yards allowed, 5

Green Bay Packers: 1964–1968

- Fewest yards allowed, passing, season, 545

Philadelphia Eagles: 1934

- Fewest yards allowed, passing, 14-game season, 1,290

Miami Dolphins: 1973

- Fewest yards allowed, passing, 16-game season, 1,960

Buffalo Bills: 1978

- Most yards allowed, passing, 16-game season, 4,796

Green Bay Packers: 2011

- Most yards allowed, passing, 14-game season, 3,674

Dallas Cowboys: 1962

=== Sacks ===
- Most seasons leading league sacks, 8

Pittsburgh Steelers: 1994, 2001, 2010, 2017, 2018, (Note: Tied for league lead with the Kansas City Chiefs) 2019, 2020, 2021

- Most consecutive seasons leading league sacks, 5

Pittsburgh Steelers: 2017–2021

- Most sacks, season, 72

Chicago Bears: 1984

- Fewest sacks, season, 10

Kansas City Chiefs: 2008

- Most sacks, single team, game, 12

Dallas Cowboys (vs Pittsburgh Steelers) Nov 20, 1966
St. Louis Cardinals (vs Baltimore Colts) Oct 26, 1980
Chicago Bears (vs Detroit Lions) Dec 16, 1984
Dallas Cowboys (vs Houston Oilers) Sep 29, 1985
New York Giants (vs Philadelphia Eagles) Sep 30, 2007

- Most sacks, single team, half, 9

New York Giants (vs Chicago Bears) Oct 3, 2010

- Most combined sacks (both teams), game, 18

Green Bay Packers (8) vs San Diego Chargers (10), Sep 24, 1978

- Most combined sacks (both teams), half, 11

New York Giants (9) vs Chicago Bears (2), Oct 3, 2010

- Most opponents yards lost attempting to pass, season, 665

Oakland Raiders: 1967

- Fewest opponents yards lost attempting to pass, season, 72

Jacksonville Jaguars: 1995

- Most sacks allowed, season, 104

Philadelphia Eagles: 1986

- Fewest sacks allowed, season, 7

Miami Dolphins: 1988

== Special teams ==
=== Blocked field goal returns ===
- Most consecutive games without a blocked field goal return for a touchdown, 1004

Pittsburgh Steelers: November 2, 1952–2021 (ongoing)

- Most consecutive games without allowing a blocked field goal return for a touchdown, 926

Cleveland Browns: October 17, 1948–November 30, 2015

- Most consecutive games blocking a field goal return for a touchdown, 2

San Francisco 49ers: 2008

- Most blocked field goals returned for a touchdown, season, 2

New England Patriots: 2014
San Francisco 49ers: 2008
Dallas Cowboys: 1965

=== Kick returns ===
- Most seasons leading league kick returns (average return), 8

Washington Redskins: 1942, 1947, 1962–63, 1973–74, 1981, 1995

- Most consecutive seasons leading league kick returns (average return), 3

Denver Broncos: 1965–1967

- Most kickoff returns, season, 89

Cleveland Browns: 1999

- Fewest kickoff returns, season, 17

New York Giants: 1944

- Most kickoff returns, single team, game, 12

New York Giants (vs Washington Redskins) Nov 27, 1966

- Most kickoff returns, both teams, game, 19

New York Giants (12) vs Washington Redskins (7), Nov 27, 1966

- Most yards, kickoff returns, season, 2,296

Arizona Cardinals: 2000

- Fewest yards, kickoff returns, season, 282

New York Giants: 1940

- Most yards, kickoff returns, game, 367

Baltimore Ravens (vs Minnesota Vikings) Dec 13, 1998

- Most yards, kickoff returns, both teams, game, 560

Detroit Lions (362) vs Los Angeles Rams (198), Oct 29, 1950

- Highest average, kickoff returns, season, 29.9

Kansas City Chiefs (44–1,316): 2013

- Lowest average, kickoff returns, season, 14.7

New York Jets (46–675): 1993

- Most touchdowns, kickoff returns, season, 6

Buffalo Bills: 2004

- Most touchdowns, kickoff returns, game, 2

Chicago Bears (vs Green Bay Packers) Sep 22, 1940
Chicago Bears (vs Green Bay Packers) Nov 9, 1952
Philadelphia Eagles (vs Dallas Cowboys) Nov 6, 1966
Green Bay Packers (vs Cleveland Browns) Nov 12, 1967
Los Angeles Rams (vs Green Bay Packers) Nov 24, 1985
New Orleans Saints (vs Los Angeles Rams) Oct 23, 1994
Baltimore Ravens (vs Minnesota Vikings) Dec 13, 1998
Chicago Bears (vs St. Louis Rams) Dec 11, 2006
Miami Dolphins (vs New York Jets) Nov 1, 2009
Cleveland Browns (vs Kansas City Chiefs) Dec 20, 2009
Seattle Seahawks (vs San Diego Chargers) Sep 26, 2010

- Most touchdowns, kickoff returns, both teams, game, 3

Baltimore Ravens (2) vs Minnesota Vikings (1), Dec 13, 1998

- Fewest opponents kickoff returns, season, 10

Brooklyn Dodgers: 1943

- Most opponents kickoff returns, season, 93

Indianapolis Colts: 2003

- Fewest yards allowed, kickoff returns, season, 225

Brooklyn Dodgers 1943

- Most yards allowed, kickoff returns, season, 2,115

St. Louis Rams: 1999

- Lowest average allowed, kickoff returns, season, 14.3

Cleveland Browns (71 returns, 1,018 yd): 1980

- Highest average allowed, kickoff returns, season, 29.5

New York Jets (47 returns, 1,386 yd): 1972

- Most touchdowns allowed, kickoff returns, season, 4

Minnesota Vikings: 1998

- Most consecutive games without allowing a kickoff return for a touchdown, 265

Cleveland Browns: September 14, 1986–November 28, 2004 (no Cleveland Browns franchise 1996–98, due to team relocation and renamed to Baltimore Ravens)

- Most consecutive games without a kickoff return for a touchdown, 498

Tampa Bay Buccaneers: September 12, 1976–December 9, 2007

=== Punting ===
- Most seasons leading league punting (average distance), 7

Denver Broncos: 1962–1964, 1966–67, 1982, 1999

- Most consecutive seasons leading league punting (average distance), 4

Washington Redskins: 1940–1943

- Most punts, season, 114

Chicago Bears: 1981
Houston Texans: 2002

- Fewest punts, season, 23

San Diego Chargers: 1982

- Fewest punts, 16-game season, 34

Houston Oilers: 1990

- Most punts, game, 17

Chicago Bears (vs Green Bay Packers) Oct 22, 1933

- Fewest punts, game, 0 (zero)

By many teams; last time: Seattle Seahawks vs Dallas Cowboys, Nov 30, 2023 (both teams with 0 punts)

- Most punts, both teams, game, 31

Chicago Bears (17) vs Green Bay Packers (14), Oct 22, 1933

- Fewest punts, both teams, game, 0 (zero)

Buffalo Bills vs San Francisco 49ers, Sep 13, 1992
Green Bay Packers vs Chicago Bears, September 28, 2014
New Orleans Saints vs Green Bay Packers, October 26, 2014
Kansas City Chiefs vs Philadelphia Eagles, October 3, 2021
Seattle Seahawks vs Dallas Cowboys, November 30, 2023

- Highest average distance, punting, season, 47.6

Detroit Lions (56 attempts, 2,664 yd): 1961

- Lowest average distance, punting, season, 32.7

Card-Pitt (60 attempts, 1,964 yd): 1944

=== Punt returns ===
- Most seasons leading league punt returns (average return), 9

Detroit Lions: 1943–1945, 1951–52, 1962, 1966, 1969, 1991

- Most consecutive seasons leading league (average return), 3

Detroit Lions: 1943–1945

- Most punt returns, season, 71

Pittsburgh Steelers: 1976 (14-game season)
Tampa Bay Buccaneers: 1979
Los Angeles Raiders: 1985

- Fewest punt returns, season, 10

New York Jets: 2020

- Most punt returns, single team, game, 12

Philadelphia Eagles (vs Cleveland Browns) Dec 3, 1950

- Most punt returns, both teams, game, 17

Philadelphia Eagles (12) vs Cleveland Browns (5) Dec 3, 1950

- Most fair catches, season, 34

Baltimore Colts: 1971

- Fewest fair catches, season, 0

San Diego Chargers: 1975
New England Patriots: 1976
Tampa Bay Buccaneers: 1976
Pittsburgh Steelers: 1977
Dallas Cowboys: 1982

- Most yards, punt returns, season, 875

Green Bay Packers: 1996

- Fewest yards, punt returns, season, 27

St. Louis Cardinals: 1965

- Most yards, punt returns, single team, game, 231

Detroit Lions (vs San Francisco 49ers) Oct 6, 1963

- Fewest yards, punt returns, single team, game, −28

Washington Redskins (vs Dallas Cowboys) Dec 11, 1966

- Most yards, punt returns, both teams, game, 282

Los Angeles Rams (219) vs Atlanta Falcons (63), Oct 11, 1981

- Fewest yards, punt returns, both teams, game, −18

Buffalo Bills (−18) vs Pittsburgh Steelers (0), Oct 29, 1972

- Highest average, punt returns, season, 20.2

Chicago Bears (27–546) 1941

- Lowest average, punt returns, season, 1.2

St. Louis Cardinals (23–27) 1965

- Most touchdowns, punt returns, season, 5

Chicago Cardinals: 1959

- Most touchdowns, punt returns, single team, game, 2

Detroit Lions (vs Los Angeles Rams) Oct 14, 1951
Detroit Lions (vs Green Bay Packers) Nov 22, 1951
Chicago Cardinals (vs Pittsburgh Steelers) Nov 1, 1959
Chicago Cardinals (vs New York Giants) Nov 22, 1959
New York Titans (vs Denver Broncos) Sep 24, 1961
Denver Broncos (vs Cleveland Browns) Sep 26, 1976
Los Angeles Rams (vs Atlanta Falcons) Oct 11, 1981
St. Louis Cardinals (vs Tampa Bay Buccaneers) Dec 21, 1986
Los Angeles Rams (vs Atlanta Falcons) Dec 27, 1992
Cleveland Browns (vs Pittsburgh Steelers) Oct 24, 1993
San Diego Chargers (vs Cincinnati Bengals) Nov 2, 1997
Denver Broncos (vs Carolina Panthers) Nov 9, 1997
Baltimore Ravens (vs Seattle Seahawks) Dec 7, 1997
Baltimore Ravens (vs New York Jets) Dec 24, 2000
New Orleans Saints (vs Minnesota Vikings) Oct 6, 2008

- Most touchdowns, punt returns, both teams, game, 2

Philadelphia Eagles (1) vs Washington Redskins (1), Nov 9, 1952
Kansas City Chiefs (1) vs Buffalo Bills (1), Sep 11, 1966
Baltimore Colts (1) vs New England Patriots (1), Nov 18, 1979
Los Angeles Raiders (1) vs Philadelphia Eagles (1) (OT), Nov 30, 1986
Cincinnati Bengals (1) vs Green Bay Packers (1), Sep 20, 1992
Oakland Raiders (1) vs Seattle Seahawks (1), Nov 15, 1998
Seattle Seahawks (1) vs St. Louis Rams (1), Sep 13, 2015

- Fewest opponents punt returns, season, 7

Washington Redskins: 1962
San Diego Chargers: 1982

- Most opponents punt returns, season, 71

Tampa Bay Buccaneers: 1976
Tampa Bay Buccaneers: 1977

- Fewest yards allowed, punt returns, season, 22

Green Bay Packers: 1967

- Fewest yards allowed, punt returns, 16-game season, 46

New Orleans Saints 2020

- Most yard touchdowns, 34

St. Louis Cardinals: December 11, 1983–December 21, 1985

- Most consecutive games without allowing a passing touchdown, 8

Green Bay Packers: December 19, 1971–October 29, 1972
Cleveland Browns: December 26, 1987–October 16, 1988

== Turnovers ==
- Most turnovers, season, 63

San Francisco 49ers: 1978

- Most takeaways, season, 63

Seattle Seahawks: 1984

- Fewest turnovers, season, 8

New Orleans Saints: 2019

- Best turnover margin, season, +43

Washington Redskins: 1983

- Worst turnover margin, season, –30

Chicago Rockets: 1948 (AAFC record)
Pittsburgh Steelers: 1965

- Most consecutive games without a turnover, 8

Kansas City Chiefs: 2024

- Most consecutive games without a takeaway, 8

Tampa Bay Buccaneers: 2018

- Most turnovers, single team, game, 12

Detroit Lions (vs Chicago Bears), Nov 22, 1942
Chicago Cardinals (vs Philadelphia Eagles), Sep 24, 1950
Pittsburgh Steelers (vs Philadelphia Eagles), Dec 12, 1965

- Most turnovers, both teams, game, 17

Detroit Lions (12) vs Chicago Bears (5), Nov 22, 1942
Boston Yanks (9) vs Philadelphia Eagles (8), Dec 8, 1946

- Fewest takeaways (opponents' turnovers), season, 4

New York Jets: 2025

- Most takeaways (opponents' turnovers), season, 66

San Diego Chargers: 1961

- Most takeaways (opponents' turnovers), game, 12

Chicago Bears (vs Detroit Lions) Nov 22, 1942
Philadelphia Eagles (vs Chicago Cardinals) Sep 24, 1950
Philadelphia Eagles (vs Pittsburgh Steelers) Dec 12, 1965

=== Fumbles ===
- Most fumbles, season, 56

Chicago Bears: 1938
San Francisco 49ers: 1978

- Fewest fumbles, season, 6

New Orleans Saints: 2011

- Most fumbles, game, 10

Phil-Pitt Steagles (vs New York Giants) Oct 9, 1943
Detroit Lions (vs Minnesota Vikings) Nov 12, 1967
Kansas City Chiefs (vs Houston Oilers) Oct 12, 1969
San Francisco 49ers (vs Detroit Lions) Dec 17, 1978

- Most fumbles, both teams, game, 14

Washington Redskins (8) vs Pittsburgh Pirates (6), Nov 14, 1937
Chicago Bears (7) vs Cleveland Rams (7), Nov 24, 1940
St. Louis Cardinals (8) vs New York Giants (6), Sep 17, 1961
Kansas City Chiefs (10) vs Houston Oilers (4), Oct 12, 1969

- Most fumble return yards, single team, game, 180

Philadelphia Eagles (vs New York Giants) September 25, 1938

- Most fumbles lost, season, 36

Chicago Cardinals: 1959

- Fewest fumbles lost, season, 2

Kansas City Chiefs: 2002

- Most fumbles lost, single team, game, 8

St. Louis Cardinals (vs Washington Redskins) Oct 25, 1976
Cleveland Browns (vs Pittsburgh Steelers) Dec 23, 1990

- Most fumbles recovered, own and opponents', season, 58

Minnesota Vikings (27 own, 31 opp): 1963

- Fewest fumbles recovered, own and opponents', season, 8

New Orleans Saints (1 own, 7 opp): 2011

- Most fumbles recovered, own and opponents', game, 10

Denver Broncos (vs Buffalo Bills (5 own, 5 opp)) Dec 13, 1964
Pittsburgh Steelers (vs Houston Oilers (5 own, 5 opp)) Dec 9, 1973
Washington Redskins vs (St. Louis Cardinals (2 own, 8 opp)) Oct 25, 1976

- Most own fumbles recovered, season, 37

Chicago Bears: 1938

- Fewest own fumbles recovered, season, 1

New Orleans Saints: 2011

- Most opponents' fumbles recovered, season, 31

Minnesota Vikings: 1963

- Fewest opponents' fumbles recovered, season, 3

Los Angeles Rams: 1974
Green Bay Packers: 1995

- Most opponents' fumbles recovered, game, 8

Washington Redskins (vs St. Louis Cardinals) Oct 25, 1976
Pittsburgh Steelers (vs Cleveland Browns) Dec 23, 1990

- Most fumbles returned for touchdowns by opponents, season, 6

Cincinnati Bengals: 1986

- Most touchdowns, fumbles recovered, own and opponents', season, 7

Arizona Cardinals (3 own, 4 opp): 2010

- Most touchdowns, own fumbles recovered, season, 3

Arizona Cardinals: 2010

- Most touchdowns, opponents' fumbles recovered, season, 4

Detroit Lions 1937
Chicago Bears: 1942
Boston Yanks: 1948
Los Angeles Rams: 1952
San Francisco 49ers: 1965
Denver Broncos: 1984
St. Louis Cardinals: 1987
Minnesota Vikings: 1989
Atlanta Falcons: 1991
Philadelphia Eagles: 1995
New Orleans Saints: 1998
Kansas City Chiefs: 1999
Arizona Cardinals: 2010

- Most touchdowns, fumbles recovered, own and opponents game, 2

By many teams

- Most touchdowns, fumbles recovered, both teams, own and opponents', game, 3

Detroit Lions (2) vs Minnesota Vikings (1) (2 own, 1 opp), Dec 9, 1962
Green Bay Packers (2) vs Dallas Cowboys (1) (3 opp) ,Nov 28, 1964
Oakland Raiders (2) vs Buffalo Bills (1) (3 opp), Dec 24, 1967
Oakland Raiders (2) vs Philadelphia Eagles (1) (3 opp), Sep 24, 1995
Tennessee Titans (2) vs Pittsburgh Steelers (1), Jan 2, 2000

- Most touchdowns, own fumbles recovered, game, 2

Miami Dolphins (vs New England Patriots), Sep 1, 1996

- Most touchdowns, opponents' fumbles recovered, game, 2

Detroit Lions (vs Cleveland Rams), Nov 7, 1937
Philadelphia Eagles (vs New York Giants), Sep 25, 1938
Chicago Bears (vs Washington Redskins), Nov 28, 1948
New York Giants (vs Pittsburgh Steelers), Sep 17, 1950
Cleveland Browns (vs Dallas Cowboys), Dec 3, 1961
Cleveland Browns (vs New York Giants), Oct 25, 1964
Green Bay Packers (vs Dallas Cowboys), Nov 29, 1964
San Francisco 49ers (vs Detroit Lions), Nov 14, 1965
Oakland Raiders (vs Buffalo Bills), Dec 24, 1967
New York Giants (vs Green Bay Packers), Sep 19, 1971
Washington Redskins (vs San Diego Chargers), Sep 16, 1973
New Orleans Saints (vs San Francisco 49ers), Oct 19, 1975
Cincinnati Bengals (vs Pittsburgh Steelers), Oct 14, 1979
Atlanta Falcons (vs Detroit Lions), Oct 5, 1980
Kansas City Chiefs (vs Oakland Raiders), Oct 5, 1980
New England Patriots (vs Baltimore Colts), Nov 23, 1980
Denver Broncos (vs Green Bay Packers), Oct 15, 1984
Miami Dolphins (vs Kansas City Chiefs), Oct 11, 1987
St. Louis Cardinals (vs New Orleans Saints), Oct 11, 1987
Minnesota Vikings (vs Atlanta Falcons), Dec 10, 1989
Philadelphia Eagles (vs Phoenix Cardinals), Nov 24, 1991
Cincinnati Bengals (vs Seattle Seahawks), Sep 6, 1992
Oakland Raiders (vs Philadelphia Eagles), Sep 24, 1995
Pittsburgh Steelers (vs New England Patriots), Dec 16, 1995
New England Patriots (vs San Diego Chargers), Dec 1, 1996
Tennessee Titans (vs Pittsburgh Steelers), Jan 2, 2000
Chicago Bears (vs Minnesota Viking) Oct 19, 2008
Dallas Cowboys (vs Philadelphia Eagles) Dec 28, 2008
San Francisco 49ers (vs St. Louis Rams) Oct 4, 2009
Arizona Cardinals (vs New Orleans Saints) Oct 10, 2010
Baltimore Ravens (vs New York Jets) Oct 2, 2011
Jacksonville Jaguars (vs Tampa Bay Buccaneers) Dec 11, 2011
New England Patriots (vs New York Jets), Nov 22, 2012
Jacksonville Jaguars (vs New York Giants), Nov 30, 2014
Atlanta Falcons (vs Houston Texans), Oct 4, 2015
Arizona Cardinals (vs Green Bay Packers), Dec 27, 2015
Dallas Cowboys (vs Buffalo Bills), Jan 31, 1993 (Super Bowl XXVII)

- Most touchdowns, opponents' fumbles recovered, both teams, game, 3

Green Bay Packers (2) vs Dallas Cowboys (1), Nov 29, 1964
Oakland Raiders (2) vs Buffalo Bills (1), Dec 24, 1967
Oakland Raiders (2) vs Philadelphia Eagles (1), Sep 24, 1995
Tennessee Titans (2) vs Pittsburgh Steelers (1), Jan 2, 2000

- Most consecutive games, no fumbles returned for touchdown (by defense), 119

San Francisco 49ers: September 18, 1949–October 25, 1959

- Most consecutive games, without allowing a fumble returned for touchdown, 153

Miami Dolphins: September 7, 2008–October 26, 2017

- Fewest opponents' fumbles, season, 11

Cleveland Browns: 1956
Baltimore Colts: 1982
Tennessee Oilers: 1998

- Most opponents' fumbles, season, 50

Minnesota Vikings: 1963
San Francisco 49ers: 1978

=== Interceptions (Note: This section is for passes intercepted by defense. For interceptions thrown by offense, see the "Passing" section above.) ===
- Most seasons leading league interceptions, 11

New York Giants: 1933, 1937–1939, 1944, 1948, 1951, 1954, 1961, 1997, 2013

- Most consecutive seasons leading league interceptions, 5

Kansas City Chiefs: 1966–1970

- Most passes intercepted (by defense), season, 49

San Diego Chargers: 1961

- Most yards returning interceptions, season, 503

Chicago Bears: 1986

- Fewest passes intercepted (by defense), season, 0

New York Jets: 2025

- Most passes intercepted (by defense), single team, game, 9

Green Bay Packers (vs Detroit Lions): October 24, 1943
Philadelphia Eagles (vs Pittsburgh Steelers): Dec 12, 1965

- Most consecutive games, one or more interception returned for touchdown (by defense), 5

Cleveland Browns: December 3, 1946–September 21, 1947

- Most consecutive games, one or more interceptions (by defense), 46

Los Angeles/San Diego Chargers: 1960–63

- Most consecutive games, no interception returned for touchdown (by defense), 118

Houston Oilers: October 16, 1979–September 20, 1987

- Most consecutive games, no interceptions (by defense), 17

New York Jets: September 7, 2025–December 23, 2025

- Most yards returning interceptions, season, 929

San Diego Chargers: 1961

- Fewest yards returning interceptions, season, –2

Cleveland Browns: 2024

- Most yards returning interceptions, single team, game, 325

Seattle Seahawks (vs Kansas City Chiefs): Nov 4, 1984

- Most yards returning interceptions, both teams, game, 356

Seattle Seahawks (325) vs Kansas City Chiefs (31): Nov 4, 1984

- Most touchdowns, returning interceptions, season, 9

San Diego Chargers: 1961

- Most touchdowns returning interceptions, game, 4

Seattle Seahawks (vs Kansas City Chiefs): Nov 4, 1984

- Most touchdowns returning interceptions, both teams, game, 4

Philadelphia Eagles (3) vs Pittsburgh Steelers (1): Dec 12, 1965
Seattle Seahawks (4) vs Kansas City Chiefs (0): Nov 4, 1984

== Penalties ==
- Most seasons leading league, fewest penalties, 13

Miami Dolphins: 1968, 1976–1984, 1986, 1990–91

- Most consecutive seasons leading league, fewest penalties, 9

Miami Dolphins: 1976–1984

- Most seasons leading league, most penalties, 16

Chicago Bears: 1941–1944, 1946–1949, 1951, 1959–1961, 1963, 1965, 1968, 1976

- Most consecutive seasons leading league, most penalties, 4

Chicago Bears: 1941–1944, 1946–1949
L.A./Oakland Raiders: 1993–1996

- Fewest penalties, season, 19

Detroit Lions: 1937

- Fewest penalties, 14-game season, 36

Minnesota Vikings: 1961

- Fewest penalties, 16-game season, 55

Atlanta Falcons: 2012

- Most penalties, season, 163

Oakland Raiders: 2011

- Most penalties, both teams, game, 37

Cleveland Browns (21) vs Chicago Bears (16), Nov 25, 1951

- Most penalties, single team, game, 23

Oakland Raiders, vs Tampa Bay Buccaneers, Oct 30, 2016

- Most seasons leading league, fewest yards penalized, 13

Miami Dolphins: 1967–68, 1973, 1977–1984, 1990–91

- Most consecutive seasons leading league, fewest yards penalized, 8

Miami Dolphins: 1977–1984

- Most seasons leading league, most yards penalized, 15

Chicago Bears: 1935, 1937, 1939–1944, 1946–47, 1949, 1951, 1961–62, 1968

- Most consecutive seasons leading league, most yards penalized, 6

Chicago Bears: 1939–1944

- Fewest yards penalized, season, 139

Detroit Lions: 1937

- Most yards penalized, season, 1,415

Seattle Seahawks: 2013

- Most yards penalized, single team, game, 212

Tennessee Titans (vs Baltimore Ravens) Oct 10, 1999

- Most yards penalized, both teams, game, 374

Cleveland Browns (209) vs Chicago Bears (165), Nov 25, 1951

== Other ==
- Team with the worst start to win multiple playoff games, 4–7

Jacksonville Jaguars, 1996

- Consecutive games without losing by more than 10 points (including the playoffs), 95

Seattle Seahawks, October 30, 2011–December 10, 2016

== See also ==
- List of NFL individual records
- List of Super Bowl records
