= 1951 Cleveland Browns season =

NFL team season

- Owner: Mickey McBride
- General manager: Paul Brown
- Head coach: Paul Brown
- Home stadium: Cleveland Stadium

Results
- Record: 11–1
- Division place: 1st NFL American
- Playoffs: Lost NFL Championship (at Rams) 17–24
- All-Pros: Len Ford; Otto Graham; Dub Jones; Bill Willis
- Pro Bowlers: Ken Carpenter, HB; Dante Lavelli, E Lou Groza, LT; Tony Adamle, LB; Len Ford, DE; Otto Graham, QB; Dub Jones, HB; Bill Willis, LB

The 1951 Cleveland Browns season was the team's second season with the National Football League. Dub Jones set an NFL record with six touchdowns in one game versus the Chicago Bears.

== Offseason and roster moves ==
Cleveland won the NFL championship in 1950, its first year in the league after four seasons in the defunct All-America Football Conference. Head coach Paul Brown made a number of roster moves in the offseason, including bringing in fullback Chick Jagade, end Bob Oristaglio and defensive backs Don Shula and Carl Taseff.

=== NFL draft selections ===
1951 Cleveland Browns draft
Round	Pick	Player	Position	College	Notes
1	14	Ken Konz *	Halfback	LSU	Career delayed by service in the Korean War; Pro Bowl (1955)
2	18	Bucky Curtis	End	Vanderbilt	
3	38	Jerry Helluin	Tackle	Tulane	Career delayed by service in the Korean War
4	39	Bob Oristaglio	End	Pennsylvania	
4	41	Bob Smith	Halfback	Texas A&M	
4	50	Art Donovan * ^{†}	Tackle	Boston College	5× Pro Bowl (1953, 1954, 1955, 1956, 1957); Hall of Fame class of 1968
5	62	Ace Loomis	Halfback	Wisconsin-La Crosse	
6	74	Dan Rogas	Guard	Tulane	
7	82	Irv Holdash	Center	North Carolina	
7	86	Walt Michaels *	Halfback	Washington and Lee	5× Pro Bowl (1955, 1956, 1957, 1958, 1959)
8	88	Art Spinney *	End	Boston College	2× Pro Bowl (1959, 1960)
8	98	Max Clark	Halfback	Houston	
9	105	Burl Toler	Guard	San Francisco	
9	110	Don Shula ^{†}	Halfback	John Carroll	Hall of Fame class of 1997
10	123	Chet Gierula	Guard	Maryland	
11	135	Bernie Curtis	Halfback	Syracuse	
12	142	Milan Sellers	Halfback	Florida State	
12	147	Stew Kirtley	End	Morehead State	
13	159	Bob Voskuhl	Center	Georgetown (KY)	
14	171	Rudy Cernoch	Tackle	Northwestern	
15	183	Joe Skibinski	Guard	Purdue	
16	195	Ed Pasky	Halfback	South Carolina	
17	207	Leroy Ka-Ne	Halfback	Dayton	
18	219	Rube DeRoin	Center	Oklahoma State	
19	231	Ray Solari	Guard	California	
20	243	Jack Crocher	Halfback	Tulsa	
21	255	Ray Stone	End	Texas	
22	267	Carl Taseff	Cornerback	John Carroll	
23	279	Johnny Champion	Halfback	Southern Methodist	
24	291	Wayne Benner	Halfback	Florida State	
25	303	John Knispel	Tackle	Wisconsin–La Crosse	
26	315	Fred Williams *	Tackle	Arkansas	4× Pro Bowl (1952, 1953, 1958, 1959)
27	327	Jack Jones	Halfback	Livingston	
28	339	Roger Thrift	Halfback	East Carolina	
29	351	Bill Driver	Halfback	Florida State	
30	362	Sisto Averno	Guard	Muhlenberg	
Made roster † Pro Football Hall of Fame * Made at least one Pro Bowl during career

== Roster and coaching staff ==
1951 Cleveland Browns roster
Quarterbacks: 60 Otto Graham; Running backs: 90 Rex Bumgardner; 84 Ken Carpenter CB; 70 Emerson Cole OLB; 72 Chick Jagade; 86 Dub Jones; 76 Marion Motley OLB; 98 Carl Taseff; Receivers: 59 Horace Gillom P/DE; 56 Dante Lavelli; 58 Mac Speedie	Offensive linemen: 22 Frank Gatski C; 38 Bob Gaudio G; 34 Abe Gibron G; 46 Lou Groza T/K; 32 Lin Houston G; 44 Lou Rymkus T; Defensive linemen: 53 Len Ford DE; 48 Chubby Grigg DT; 45 John Kissell DT; 50 Bob Oristaglio DE/WR; 42 Derrell Palmer DT/T; 49 John Sandusky DT/T; 30 Bill Willis MG; 52 George Young DE	Linebackers: 74 Tony Adamle OLB; 35 Alex Agase MLB/MG; 20 Hal Herring MLB; 23 Tommy Thompson OLB/C; Defensive backs: 82 Tommy James CB; 80 Warren Lahr CB; 62 Cliff Lewis S/QB; 96 Don Shula CB/S	Reserve list: -- Ken Gorgal S (Military); 94 Don Phelps RB (IR); -- Art Spinney WR (Military); Head Coach: Paul Brown; Assistants: Blanton Collier (Backfield); Weeb Ewbank (Tackles); Fritz Heisler (Guards); Tim Temerario (Ends); rookies in italics

== Preseason ==
Week	Date	Opponent	Result	Record	Venue	Attendance
1	August 17	College All-Stars	W 38–7	1–0	Soldier Field	92,180
2	August 25	New York Yanks	W 52–0	2–0	Rubber Bowl	25,820
3	September 4	at Detroit Lions	L 20–21	2–1	Briggs Stadium	35,165
4	September 9	at Chicago Bears	W 32–21	3–1	Wrigley Field	67,342
5	September 14	Los Angeles Rams	W 7–6	4–1	Cleveland Municipal Stadium	38,851

== Regular season schedule ==
Week	Date	Opponent	Result	Record	Venue	Attendance	Recap
1	September 30	at San Francisco 49ers	**L** 10–24	0–1	Kezar Stadium	52,219	Recap
2	October 7	at Los Angeles Rams	**W** 38–23	1–1	Los Angeles Memorial Coliseum	67,186	Recap
3	October 14	**Washington Redskins**	**W** 45–0	2–1	Cleveland Municipal Stadium	33,968	Recap
4	October 21	**Pittsburgh Steelers**	**W** 17–0	3–1	Cleveland Municipal Stadium	32,409	Recap
5	October 28	**New York Giants**	**W** 14–13	4–1	Cleveland Municipal Stadium	56,947	Recap
6	November 4	at **Chicago Cardinals**	**W** 34–17	5–1	Comiskey Park	19,742	Recap
7	November 11	**Philadelphia Eagles**	**W** 20–17	6–1	Cleveland Municipal Stadium	36,571	Recap
8	November 18	at **New York Giants**	**W** 10–0	7–1	Polo Grounds	52,215	Recap
9	November 25	Chicago Bears	**W** 42–21	8–1	Cleveland Municipal Stadium	40,969	Recap
10	December 2	**Chicago Cardinals**	**W** 49–28	9–1	Cleveland Municipal Stadium	30,550	Recap
11	December 9	at **Pittsburgh Steelers**	**W** 28–0	10–1	Forbes Field	24,229	Recap
12	December 16	at **Philadelphia Eagles**	**W** 24–9	11–1	Shibe Park	16,263	Recap
Note: Intra-division opponents are in **bold** text.

== Playoffs ==
Round	Date	Opponent	Result	Record	Venue	Attendance	Recap
Championship	December 23	at Los Angeles Rams	L 17–24	0–1	Los Angeles Memorial Coliseum	57,540	Recap

== Standings ==
NFL American Conference
	W	L	T	PCT	CONF	PF	PA	STK
Cleveland Browns	11	1	0	.917	9–0	331	152	W11
New York Giants	9	2	1	.818	7–2–1	254	161	W4
Washington Redskins	5	7	0	.417	4–5	183	296	L1
Pittsburgh Steelers	4	7	1	.364	3–5–1	183	235	W1
Philadelphia Eagles	4	8	0	.333	3–6	234	264	L2
Chicago Cardinals	3	9	0	.250	0–8	210	287	W1

Note: Tie games were not officially counted in the standings until 1972.

== Awards and records ==
- Otto Graham, NFL MVP
