= Joe Scott (American football) =

American football player (1926–2016)

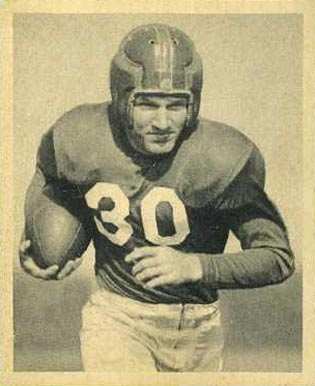
- Scott on a 1948 Bowman football card

No. 50, 30, 99
- Positions: Halfback, defensive back, end

Personal information
- Born: March 17, 1926; Murchison, Texas, U.S.
- Died: June 30, 2016 (aged 90); Athens, Texas, U.S.
- Listed height: 6 ft 1 in (1.85 m)
- Listed weight: 198 lb (90 kg)

Career information
- High school: Athens
- College: Texas A&M (1944, 1946); San Francisco (1947)
- NFL draft: 1948: 2nd round, 12th overall pick

Career history
- New York Giants (1948–1953); Montreal Alouettes (1953)

Career NFL statistics
- Rushing yards: 1,218
- Rushing average: 3.8
- Receptions: 79
- Receiving yards: 1,203
- Total touchdowns: 22
- Stats at Pro Football Reference

Joseph Oscar Scott Jr. (March 17, 1926 – June 30, 2016) was an American professional football player who played running back for six seasons for the New York Giants. He was born in Murchison, Texas, and died in Athens, Texas, where he lived in 2016.

== NFL career statistics ==
Legend
**Bold**	Career high

=== Regular season ===
Year	Team	Games		Rushing					Receiving				
Year	Team	GP	GS	Att	Yds	Avg	Lng	TD	Rec	Yds	Avg	Lng	TD
1948	NYG	10	6	48	198	4.1	20	2	17	235	13.8	43	**2**
1949	NYG	8	6	70	224	3.2	13	**6**	15	111	7.4	24	1
1950	NYG	10	2	72	322	**4.5**	**48**	2	9	240	**26.7**	**61**	1
1951	NYG	12	11	**94**	**367**	3.9	37	1	**23**	**356**	15.5	57	**2**
1952	NYG	8	4	38	107	2.8	30	3	14	251	17.9	35	1
1953	NYG	3	1	0	0	0.0	0	0	1	10	10.0	10	0
Career		51	30	322	1,218	3.8	48	14	79	1,203	15.2	61	7

=== Playoffs ===
Year	Team	Games		Rushing					Receiving				
Year	Team	GP	GS	Att	Yds	Avg	Lng	TD	Rec	Yds	Avg	Lng	TD
1950	NYG	1	1	3	-2	-0.7	-	0	0	0	0.0	0	0
Career		1	1	3	-2	-0.7	-	0	0	0	0.0	0	0

== See also ==
- Joe Scott Statistics
