= Ebert Van Buren =

American football player (1924–2019)

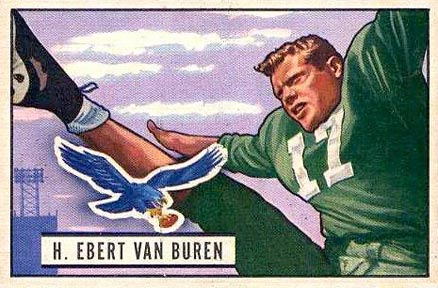
- Van Buren on a 1951 Bowman football card

No. 17, 31
- Positions: Fullback, halfback

Personal information
- Born: December 6, 1924; Tela, Honduras
- Died: June 14, 2019 (aged 94); Monroe, Louisiana, U.S.
- Listed height: 6 ft 2 in (1.88 m)
- Listed weight: 210 lb (95 kg)

Career information
- High school: Metairie (Louisiana, U.S.)
- College: LSU
- NFL draft: 1951: 1st round, 7th overall pick

Career history
- Philadelphia Eagles (1951–1953)

Awards and highlights
- LSU Athletic Hall of Fame

Career NFL statistics
- Rushing yards: 61
- Rushing average: 2.7
- Interceptions: 2
- Fumble recoveries: 5
- Stats at Pro Football Reference

Harry Ebert Van Buren (December 6, 1924 – June 14, 2019) was an American football fullback and halfback who played in the National Football League (NFL), He was drafted by the Philadelphia Eagles in 1951 and played in the 1951 through 1953 seasons. He went to Louisiana State University. He was the brother of Steve Van Buren, with whom he played during the 1951 season with the Eagles. Van Buren was inducted into the LSU Athletic Hall of Fame in 2015 and died in June 2019 at the age of 94.
