= Lloyd McDermott (gridiron football) =

American football player (1925–1964)

No. 74, 64, 68
- Position: Tackle

Personal information
- Born: December 20, 1925; Covington, Kentucky, U.S.
- Died: January 16, 1964 (aged 38); Covington, Kentucky, U.S.
- Listed height: 6 ft 3 in (1.91 m)
- Listed weight: 240 lb (109 kg)

Career information
- High school: Covington Holmes
- College: Kentucky
- NFL draft: 1950: 6th round, 79th overall pick

Career history
- Detroit Lions (1950); Chicago Cardinals (1950-1951); Ottawa Rough Riders (1952)

Career NFL statistics
- Interceptions: 1
- Fumble recoveries: 1
- Stats at Pro Football Reference

Lloyd Ivan "Big Mac" McDermott (December 20, 1925 – January 16, 1964) was an American football tackle and guard. He played college football for Kentucky from 1946 to 1949 and professional football for the Detroit Lions (1950), Chicago Cardinals (1950-1951), and Ottawa Rough Riders (1952).

== Early life ==
McDermott was born in 1925 in Covington, Kentucky. He served in the United States Marine Corps during World War II.

== College football ==
After the war, McDermott played college football at the tackle position for the Kentucky Wildcats from 1946 to 1949. As a senior, he helped lead the 1949 Kentucky Wildcats football team to a 9–2 record in the regular season and a berth in the 1950 Orange Bowl. Kentucky head coach Bear Bryant in 1949 said of McDermott, "the opposition will experience a lot of trouble trying to move that man-mountain out of position."

== Professional football ==
McDermott played professional football in the National Football League (NFL) in 1950 and 1951. He started the 1950 season with the Detroit Lions. After appearing in two games at right guard for the Lions, he was sold to the Chicago Cardinals in late September. He appeared in 11 games at left tackle for the Cardinals in 1950 and 12 games at right tackle, all as a starter, in 1951.

In July 1952, McDermott signed with the Ottawa Rough Riders of the Interprovincial Rugby Football Union (now known as the Canadian Football League). He played in 11 games for Ottawa during the 1952 season.

== Later life ==
McDermott later coached football and basketball at Covington Holmes High School. He died in 1964 at age 38 in Covington, Kentucky.
