= Rob Goode =

American football player (1927–2007)

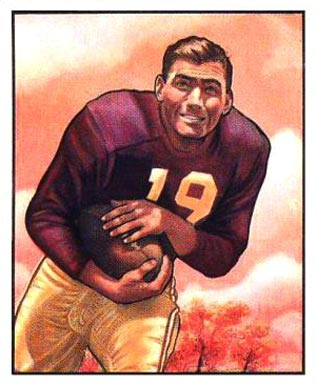
- Goode on a 1950 Bowman football card

No. 21, 39, 38
- Position: Running back

Personal information
- Born: June 5, 1927; Roby, Texas, U.S.
- Died: June 9, 2007 (aged 80); Fort Worth, Texas, U.S.
- Listed height: 6 ft 4 in (1.93 m)
- Listed weight: 222 lb (101 kg)

Career information
- High school: Bastrop (Bastrop, Texas)
- College: Texas A&M (1945-1948)
- NFL draft: 1949: 1st round, 8th overall pick

Career history
- Washington Redskins (1949–1951, 1954–1955); Philadelphia Eagles (1955)

Awards and highlights
- 2× Pro Bowl (1951, 1954); NFL rushing touchdowns leader (1951); First-team All-SWC (1945)

Career NFL statistics
- Rushing yards: 2,531
- Rushing average: 4.2
- Receptions: 53
- Receiving yards: 640
- Total touchdowns: 18
- Stats at Pro Football Reference

Robert Leslie Goode (June 5, 1927 – June 9, 2007) was an American professional football player who was a running back for the Washington Redskins and the Philadelphia Eagles of the National Football League (NFL). He played college football for the Texas A&M Aggies and was selected by the Redskins in the first round of the 1949 NFL draft. He was also selected by the Chicago Bears in the 15th round of the 1948 NFL draft and the Buffalo Bills (AAFC) in the 16th round of the 1949 AAFC draft.

== NFL career statistics ==
Legend
	Led the league
**Bold**	Career high

Year	Team	Games		Rushing					Receiving				
Year	Team	GP	GS	Att	Yds	Avg	Lng	TD	Rec	Yds	Avg	Lng	TD
1949	WAS	12	7	61	261	4.3	54	2	16	**279**	**17.4**	54	0
1950	WAS	12	7	136	560	4.1	**80**	5	**19**	160	8.4	**56**	**1**
1951	WAS	12	11	**208**	**951**	**4.6**	33	**9**	3	45	15.0	26	0
1954	WAS	12	8	108	462	4.3	44	0	4	4	1.0	10	0
1955	WAS	3	2	7	23	3.3	7	0	1	15	15.0	15	0
1955	PHI	8	4	76	274	3.6	36	0	10	137	13.7	50	0
		59	39	596	2,531	4.2	80	16	53	640	12.1	56	1
