= 1951 Washington Redskins season =

NFL team season

- Owner: George Preston Marshall
- General manager: Dick McCann
- Head coach: Dick Todd; Herman Ball
- Home stadium: Griffith Stadium

Results
- Record: 5–7
- Division place: 3rd NFL American
- Playoffs: Did not qualify

The 1951 Washington Redskins season was the franchise's 20th season in the National Football League (NFL) and their 14th in Washington, D.C. The team improved on their 3–9 record from 1950 and finished 5–7.

Although the NFL formally desegregated in 1946, many teams were slow to allow black athletes to compete even after the formal barrier had fallen. None were less willing to desegregate than the Washington Redskins, who sought to be the "home team" for a vast Southern market. The Redskins would remain the last bastion of racial segregation in the NFL, refusing to include a single black player on their roster until 1962.

== Preseason ==
Week	Date	Opponent	Result	Record	Venue	Attendance
1	August 15	at Los Angeles Rams	L 14–58	0–1	Los Angeles Memorial Coliseum	91,985
2	August 19	at San Francisco 49ers	L 14–45	0–2	Kezar Stadium	27,280
3	August 31	vs. Detroit Lions	W 10–7	1–2	Sandie Stadium (Amarillo, TX)	12,000
4	September 8	vs. New York Giants	W 14–10	2–2	Legion Field (Birmingham, AL)	20,000
5	September 14	vs. New York Yanks	W 52–14	3–2	State Fair Stadium (Shreveport, LA)	10,000
6	September 19	vs. Chicago Bears	L 19–21	3–3	Blues Stadium (Kansas City, MO)	8,212
7	September 23	Green Bay Packers	L 7–14	3–4	George Washington Stadium (Alexandria, VA)	6,000

== Regular season ==
=== Schedule ===
Game	Date	Opponent	Result	Record	Venue	Attendance	Recap	Sources
1	September 30	at Detroit Lions	**L** 17–35	0–1	Briggs Stadium	27,831	Recap	
2	October 7	**New York Giants**	**L** 14–35	0–2	Griffith Stadium	23,800	Recap	
3	October 14	at **Cleveland Browns**	**L** 0–45	0–3	Cleveland Municipal Stadium	33,968	Recap	
4	October 21	**Chicago Cardinals**	**W** 7–3	1–3	Griffith Stadium	22,960	Recap	
5	October 28	at **Philadelphia Eagles**	**W** 27–23	2–3	Shibe Park	20,437	Recap	
6	November 4	Chicago Bears	**L** 0–27	2–4	Griffith Stadium	21,737	Recap	
7	November 11	at **New York Giants**	**L** 14–28	2–5	Polo Grounds	21,242	Recap	
8	November 18	at **Pittsburgh Steelers**	**W** 22–7	3–5	Forbes Field	15,060	Recap	
9	November 25	Los Angeles Rams	**W** 31–21	4–5	Griffith Stadium	26,307	Recap	
10	December 2	**Philadelphia Eagles**	**L** 21–35	4–6	Griffith Stadium	23,738	Recap	
11	December 9	at **Chicago Cardinals**	**W** 20–17	5–6	Comiskey Park	9,459	Recap	
12	December 16	**Pittsburgh Steelers**	**L** 10–20	5–7	Griffith Stadium	18,096	Recap	
Note: Intra-conference opponents are in **bold** text.

== Standings ==
NFL American Conference
	W	L	T	PCT	CONF	PF	PA	STK
Cleveland Browns	11	1	0	.917	9–0	331	152	W11
New York Giants	9	2	1	.818	7–2–1	254	161	W4
Washington Redskins	5	7	0	.417	4–5	183	296	L1
Pittsburgh Steelers	4	7	1	.364	3–5–1	183	235	W1
Philadelphia Eagles	4	8	0	.333	3–6	234	264	L2
Chicago Cardinals	3	9	0	.250	0–8	210	287	W1

Note: Tie games were not officially counted in the standings until 1972.

== Roster ==
1951 Washington Redskins final roster
Quarterbacks: 33 Sammy Baugh; 52 Harry Gilmer S; Running backs: 44 Harry Dowda; 35 Bill Dudley K/P; 21 Rob Goode; 24 Leon Heath; 15 John Papit; 20 George Thomas; Receivers: 80 Gene Brito; 28 Hugh Taylor	Offensive linemen: 60 Buddy Brown G; 47 Laurie Niemi T; 84 Jim Peebles T/DE; 61 Gene Pepper T/DT; 63 Herb Siegert G/LB; 56 Harry Ulinski C; 62 Cas Witucki G; Defensive linemen: 57 John Badaczewski MG; 48 Bob Hendren DE; 70 Lou Karras DT; 76 Paul Lipscomb DT/T; 75 Jim Ricca MG/C; 72 Jim Staton DT; 37 Joe Tereshinski DE/LB/WR; 85 Walt Yowarsky DE	Linebackers: 39 George Buksar; 53 Al DeMao C; 36 Chuck Drazenovich FB; 34 Ed Quirk; Defensive backs: 14 Bill Cox S/P; 29 Jack Dwyer CB; 12 Neil Ferris CB; 26 Ed Salem S/QB; Reserve list: -- Nick Bolkovac DT (Military); -- Rob Goode RB (Military); -- Hall Haynes P/S/RB (Military); -- Eddie LeBaron QB (Military); -- Vic Thomas T (Military); rookies in italics
