= Bob Williams (quarterback) =

American football player (1930–2016)

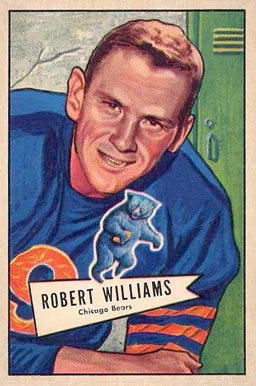
- Williams on a 1952 Bowman football card

No. 9,8
- Position: Quarterback

Personal information
- Born: January 2, 1930; Cumberland, Maryland, U.S.
- Died: May 26, 2016 (aged 86); Timonium, Maryland, U.S.
- Listed height: 6 ft 1 in (1.85 m)
- Listed weight: 197 lb (89 kg)

Career information
- College: Notre Dame
- NFL draft: 1951: 1st round, 2nd overall pick

Career history
- Chicago Bears (1951–1952, 1955)

Awards and highlights
- National champion (1949); Consensus All-American (1949); First-team All-American (1950); Nils V. "Swede" Nelson Award (1950)

Career NFL statistics
- Passing attempts: 160
- Passing completions: 74
- Completion percentage: 46.3%
- TD–INT: 10–12
- Passing yards: 981
- Passer rating: 55.8
- Stats at Pro Football Reference
- College Football Hall of Fame

Robert Allen Williams (January 2, 1930 – May 26, 2016) was an American professional football player who was a quarterback for the Chicago Bears of the National Football League (NFL). He played college football at Notre Dame.

A two-time All-American and national champion in 1949, Williams was inducted into the College Football Hall of Fame in 1988.

== Early life ==
Williams graduated from Loyola Blakefield High School in Towson, Maryland in 1948.

== College career ==
Williams attended Notre Dame on an athletic scholarship, where, as a nineteen-year-old junior quarterback, he guided Notre Dame to an undefeated season with 10 wins and no losses. Williams won the National Championship for Frank Leahy's 1949 team.

Williams finished fifth in voting for the Heisman Trophy in 1949 and sixth in 1950.

Bob Williams holds the school mark for highest passing efficiency rating for a season (minimum 50 completions) with a 159.1 rating in 1949, when he was 83 of 147 for 1,374 yards and 16 TD's. Williams was first team on the 1949 College Football All-America Team and the 1950 College Football All-America Team. He was awarded the Nils V. "Swede" Nelson Award in 1950.

== Professional career ==
Williams was the second overall selection in the 1951 NFL draft by the Chicago Bears.

Williams saw action in 8 games during the 1951 Chicago Bears season, going 11-for-34 with one touchdown pass, against two interceptions.

In 1952, his second year in the league, Williams moved into a starting role for the Bears, starting 7 of the team's 11 games. He won 3 and lost 4 of these contests, going 45-for-87 passing (a 51.7% completion percentage), with 6 touchdowns and 5 interceptions.

Unfortunately for Williams, he was drafted into the US Navy in 1953, which caused him to be unavailable for the 1953 and 1954 Bears seasons.

By the time Williams returned from military service, the Bears had moved along to a new starting quarterback. A return was made to the team for the 1955 season, with Williams seeing action in 10 games in a reserve role. Williams' year was statistically unmemorable, going 15-for-40 passing (37.5% completion rate) with 3 touchdowns, against 5 interceptions. Williams retired from the professional game following the 1955 season.

The Pittsburgh Steelers were interested in bringing Williams back to the field, and team owner Art Rooney gained permission from George Halas and the Bears to discuss possible terms. Under the reserve clause, Williams remained property of the Bears, although the Steelers hoped to convince Williams to return before working out a trade. Rooney spoke with Williams for an hour, but Williams stated that he did not wish to relocate on account of his growing family, which ultimately counted six children; Susan, Barbara, Anita, Robert, Mark, and James.

== Life after football ==
Following his NFL career, Williams became the sales manager for the Opfer-Dickinson Company, a real estate development firm in Maryland.

== Death and legacy ==
Williams died on May 26, 2016, at Mercy Ridge retirement home in Timonium, Maryland from Parkinson's disease, aged 86.

Baltimore sportswriter John Steadman remembered Williams as "Baltimore's most famous home-grown football product" and one of Notre Dame's "finest quarterbacks in history, a name to be linked with those of Frank Carideo, Angelo Bertelli, and John Lujack.

Williams was inducted into the College Football Hall of Fame in 1988.

== See also ==
- List of NCAA major college football yearly passing leaders
