= 1951 New York Giants season =

NFL team season

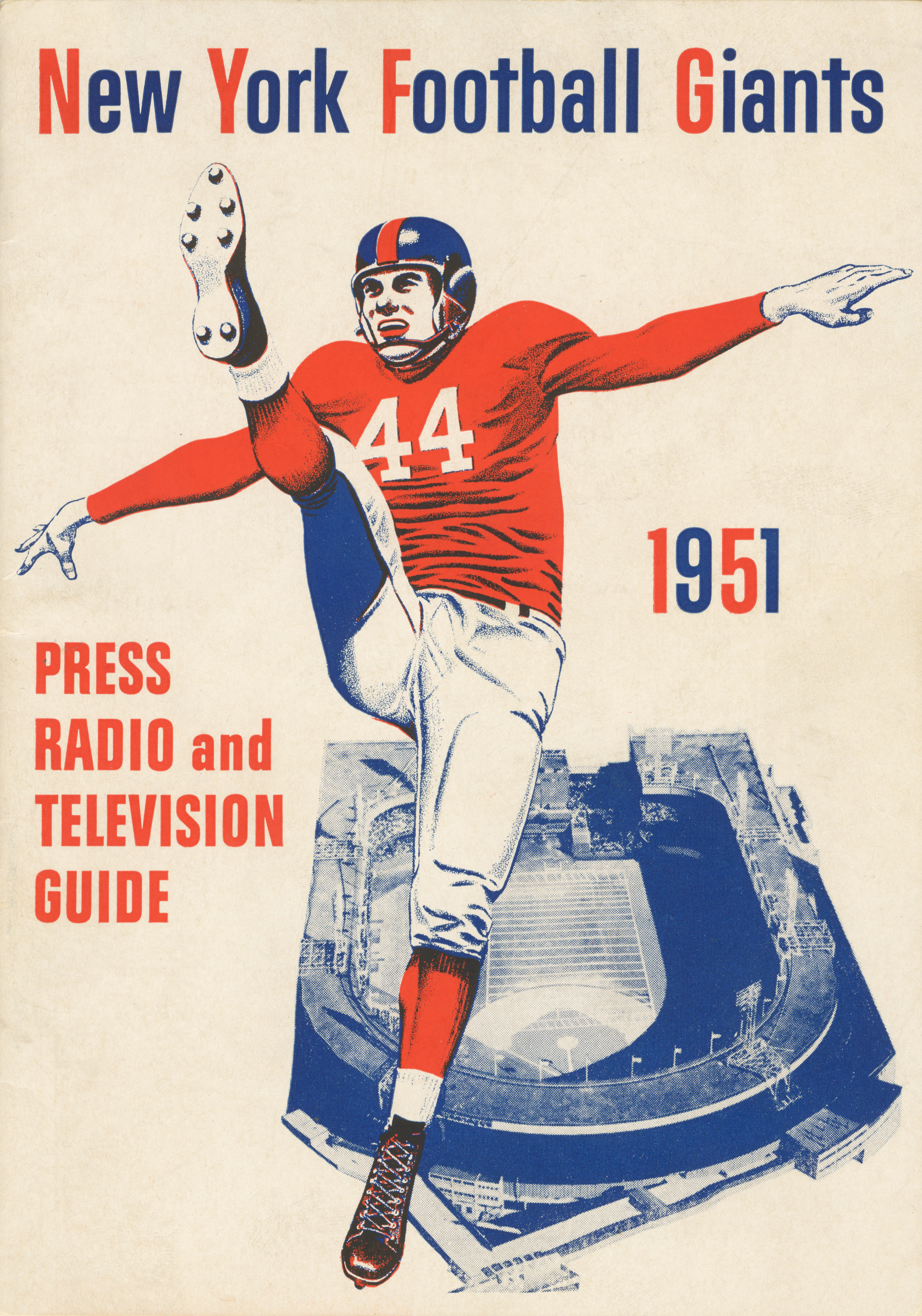
- Owner: Tim Mara
- Head coach: Steve Owen
- Home stadium: Polo Grounds

Results
- Record: 9–2–1
- Division place: 2nd NFL American
- Playoffs: Did not qualify

The 1951 New York Giants season was the franchise's 27th season in the National Football League. They finished at 9–2–1, with both losses against the Cleveland Browns.

The season finale with the neighboring Yanks at Yankee Stadium drew less than 6,700, played on an icy field with a game time temperature of 17 °F (−8 °C). It was the Yanks' final game ever.

== Regular season ==
=== Schedule ===
| Game | Date | Opponent | Result | Record | Venue | Attendance | Recap | Sources |
|---|---|---|---|---|---|---|---|---|
| 1 | October 1 | at **Pittsburgh Steelers** | **T** 13–13 | 0–0–1 | Forbes Field | 27,984 | Recap | |
| 2 | October 7 | at **Washington Redskins** | **W** 35–14 | 1–0–1 | Griffith Stadium | 23,800 | Recap | |
| 3 | October 14 | **Chicago Cardinals** | **W** 28–17 | 2–0–1 | Polo Grounds | 28,095 | Recap | |
| 4 | October 21 | **Philadelphia Eagles** | **W** 26–24 | 3–0–1 | Polo Grounds | 28,656 | Recap | |
| 5 | October 28 | at **Cleveland Browns** | **L** 13–14 | 3–1–1 | Cleveland Municipal Stadium | 56,947 | Recap | |
| 6 | November 4 | New York Yanks | **W** 37–31 | 4–1–1 | Polo Grounds | 25,682 | Recap | |
| 7 | November 11 | **Washington Redskins** | **W** 28–14 | 5–1–1 | Polo Grounds | 21,242 | Recap | |
| 8 | November 18 | **Cleveland Browns** | **L** 0–10 | 5–2–1 | Polo Grounds | 52,215 | Recap | |
| 9 | November 25 | at **Chicago Cardinals** | **W** 10–0 | 6–2–1 | Comiskey Park | 11,892 | Recap | |
| 10 | December 2 | **Pittsburgh Steelers** | **W** 14–0 | 7–2–1 | Polo Grounds | 19,196 | Recap | |
| 11 | December 9 | at **Philadelphia Eagles** | **W** 23–7 | 8–2–1 | Shibe Park | 19,322 | Recap | |
| 12 | December 16 | at New York Yanks | **W** 27–17 | 9–2–1 | Yankee Stadium | 6,658 | Recap | |
Note: Intra-conference opponents are in **bold** text.

=== Standings ===
NFL American Conference
| | W | L | T | PCT | CONF | PF | PA | STK |
|---|---|---|---|---|---|---|---|---|
| Cleveland Browns | 11 | 1 | 0 | .917 | 9–0 | 331 | 152 | W11 |
| New York Giants | 9 | 2 | 1 | .818 | 7–2–1 | 254 | 161 | W4 |
| Washington Redskins | 5 | 7 | 0 | .417 | 4–5 | 183 | 296 | L1 |
| Pittsburgh Steelers | 4 | 7 | 1 | .364 | 3–5–1 | 183 | 235 | W1 |
| Philadelphia Eagles | 4 | 8 | 0 | .333 | 3–6 | 234 | 264 | L2 |
| Chicago Cardinals | 3 | 9 | 0 | .250 | 0–8 | 210 | 287 | W1 |

Note: Tie games were not officially counted in the standings until 1972.

== Roster ==
1951 New York Giants roster
| Quarterbacks (QB): 42 Charlie Conerly P; 20 Travis Tidwell; Running backs (RB): 41 Forrest Griffith S; 34 Bob Jackson; 31 Eddie Price; 35 Bosh Pritchard; 44 Kyle Rote CB; 30 Joe Scott; Wide receivers (WR): 89 Bob Hudson; 88 Bob McChesney; 80 Kelley Mote DE; 87 Bob Wilkinson DE; Tight ends (TE) | Offensive linemen (OL): 75 Bill Albright G/T; 65 Fritz Barzilauskas G; 79 Tex Coulter T; 77 Herb Hannah T; 67 Duke Maronic G; 62 Earl Murray G; 53 John Rapacz C; 21 Joe Sulaitis G; Defensive linemen (DL): 60 Jon Baker DG; 78 Al DeRogatis DT; 86 Jim Duncan DE; 70 Ray Krouse DG; 82 Ray Poole DE/K; 73 Arnie Weinmeister DT | Linebackers (LB): 52 John Cannady; 51 Dick Woodard C; Defensive backs (DB): 12 John Amberg CB/RB/S; 49 Tom Landry CB/P; 22 Harmon Rowe CB; 83 Otto Schnellbacher S; 45 Emlen Tunnell S; Special teams (ST) | Reserve: -- Bill Austin G (Military); -- Randy Clay RB/CB (Military); -- Tom Finnin DT (Military); 81 Bill Stribling WR (IR); Rookies in italics |

== See also ==
- List of New York Giants seasons
