= Bob Oristaglio =

American football player (1924–1995)

No. 56, 57, 50, 89
- Positions: Defensive end, end

Personal information
- Born: April 6, 1924; Philadelphia, Pennsylvania, U.S.
- Died: February 14, 1995 (aged 70); York, Pennsylvania, U.S.
- Listed height: 6 ft 2 in (1.88 m)
- Listed weight: 214 lb (97 kg)

Career information
- High school: Southeast Catholic (Philadelphia)
- College: Penn (1946–1948)
- NFL draft: 1951: 4th round, 39th overall pick

Career history
- Buffalo Bills (1949); Baltimore Colts (1950); Cleveland Browns (1951); Philadelphia Eagles (1952)

Career NFL/AAFC statistics
- Receptions: 16
- Receiving yards: 168
- Touchdowns: 1
- Stats at Pro Football Reference

Bob Oristaglio (April 6, 1924 – February 14, 1995) was an American professional football defensive end. He played for the Buffalo Bills in 1949, the Baltimore Colts in 1950, the Cleveland Browns in 1951 and for the Philadelphia Eagles in 1952. He was selected by the Browns in the fourth round (39th overall) of the 1951 NFL draft.
