= 1951 Chicago Cardinals season =

American football team season

- Head coach: Phil Handler, Cecil Isbell, and Curly Lambeau
- Home stadium: Comiskey Park

Results
- Record: 3–9
- Division place: 6th NFL American
- Playoffs: Did not qualify

The 1951 Chicago Cardinals season marked the 32nd year the team was in the National Football League (NFL). The team failed to improve on their previous output of 5–7, winning only three games and failed to qualify for the playoffs for the third consecutive season.

== Schedule ==
Week	Date	Opponent	Result	Record	Venue	Attendance
1	September 30	**Philadelphia Eagles**	**L** 14–17	0–1	Comiskey Park	16,129
2	October 7	Chicago Bears	**W** 28–14	1–1	Comiskey Park	33,781
3	October 14	at **New York Giants**	**L** 17–28	1–2	Polo Grounds	28,095
4	October 21	at **Washington Redskins**	**L** 3–7	1–3	Griffith Stadium	22,960
5	October 28	**Pittsburgh Steelers**	**L** 14–28	1–4	Comiskey Park	14,773
6	November 4	**Cleveland Browns**	**L** 17–34	1–5	Comiskey Park	19,742
7	November 11	at Los Angeles Rams	**L** 21–45	1–6	Los Angeles Memorial Coliseum	29,996
8	November 18	at San Francisco 49ers	**W** 27–21	2–6	Kezar Stadium	19,658
9	November 25	**New York Giants**	**L** 0–10	2–7	Comiskey Park	11,892
10	December 2	at **Cleveland Browns**	**L** 28–49	2–8	Cleveland Municipal Stadium	30,550
11	December 9	**Washington Redskins**	**L** 17–20	2–9	Comiskey Park	9,459
12	December 16	at Chicago Bears	**W** 24–14	3–9	Wrigley Field	15,085
Note: Intra-conference opponents are in **bold** text.

== Standings ==
Program for the October 7 game against the cross-town rival Chicago Bears.

NFL American Conference
	W	L	T	PCT	CONF	PF	PA	STK
Cleveland Browns	11	1	0	.917	9–0	331	152	W11
New York Giants	9	2	1	.818	7–2–1	254	161	W4
Washington Redskins	5	7	0	.417	4–5	183	296	L1
Pittsburgh Steelers	4	7	1	.364	3–5–1	183	235	W1
Philadelphia Eagles	4	8	0	.333	3–6	234	264	L2
Chicago Cardinals	3	9	0	.250	0–8	210	287	W1

Note: Tie games were not officially counted in the standings until 1972.

== Personnel ==
=== Staff / Coaches ===
1951 Chicago Cardinals staff
Front office: Principal / Majority Owner – Violet Bidwill Wolfner; General Manager – Ray Bennigsen; Coaching staff: Head Coach – Curly Lambeau (2–8, fired after 10 games); Interim Head Coach – Cecil Isbell (1–1 remainder of season); Assistant Coaches: Backfield Coach / Assistant Head Coach – Cecil Isbell; Line Coach / Assistant Head Coach – Phil Handler; Defensive Assistant Coach – Buster Ramsey	Special Teams Coaches: None – N/A

Official team photo of the 1951 Chicago Cardinals.

1951 Chicago Cardinals roster
Quarterbacks (QB): 44 Joe Gasparella; 22 Jim Hardy; 62 Charley Trippi P; Running backs (RB): 7 Elmer Angsman; 89 Billy Cross; 17 Lindy Lauro; 36 Ralph Pasquariello; 24 Emil Sitko; Wide receivers (WR): 41 Fran Polsfoot P; 80 Don Stonesifer; Tight ends (TE)	Offensive linemen (OL): 55 Ed Bagdon G; 72 Bill Fischer T; 50 Jack Jennings T; 70 Knox Ramsey G; 32 Jack Simmons C; 18 Fred Wallner G/LB; Defensive linemen (DL): 60 Tom Bienemann DE; 42 Bob Dove DE; 82 Lou Ferry DT; 66 Jerry Hennessy DE; 11 Don Joyce DT; 64 Lloyd McDermott DT; 68 Cliff Patton MG/K; 51 Tom Wham DE	Linebackers (LB): 57 Jerry Groom C; 34 John Panelli FB; 73 Leo Sanford; Defensive backs (DB): 31 Jerry Davis CB/S/RB; 53 Tony Klimek CB; 37 Don Paul CB/RB; 87 Ray Ramsey S/WR; 67 Bill Svoboda S/RB; 21 S. J. Whitman CB; Special teams (ST)	Reserve: -- John Hock DT (Military); 8 Frank Tripucka QB (IR); Rookies in italics
