= 1951 Philadelphia Eagles season =

NFL team season

- Owner: Happy Hundred
- Head coach: Bo McMillin 2–0 and Wayne Millner 2–8
- Home stadium: Shibe Park

Results
- Record: 4–8
- Division place: 5th NFL American
- Playoffs: Did not qualify

The 1951 Philadelphia Eagles season was their 19th in the league. The team failed to improve on their previous output of 6–6, winning only four games. The team failed to qualify for the playoffs for the second consecutive season.

== Off Season ==
The Eagle hired Bo McMillin who took on the challenge of returning the Philadelphia Eagles to their previous glory was hired on February 8, 1951. However, after just two games (both wins), McMillin underwent surgery for what was believed to be ulcer troubles. The verdict was far worse: stomach cancer, which ended his coaching career. Assistant coach Wayne Miller took over as head coach for the rest of the year. He would resign weeks before the 1952 season citing health as the reason for stepping down.

=== NFL draft ===
The 1951 NFL draft was held on January 18–19, 1951. This draft would be for players coming out of college and because Baltimore Colts folded after the 1950 season. The NFL placed their players in the 1951 NFL draft. The draft was 30 rounds with eleven teams picking. There was a total of 362 players drafted. 27 former Colts players were drafted including Y. A. Tittle by San Francisco 49ers.

The Eagles would rotate getting the 5th, 6th and 7th picks through the rounds as a results of their 6–6 record in 1950, tying them with Pittsburgh and Detroit.

With the lottery bonus pick as the #1 pick of the draft, the New York Giants choose Kyle Rote a Halfback from Southern Methodist University The 2nd pick in the draft was made by the Chicago Bears. This was the Baltimore Colts 1st round pick that would have had, that was earlier traded to Chicago. With this pick they choose Bob Williams a Quarterback from the Notre Dame.

With their 1st pick as the 7th selection in the 1st round the Eagles choose, Ebert Van Buren, brother of Steve Van Buren, a Fullback/Halfback out of LSU.

=== Player selections ===
The table shows the Eagles selections and what picks they had that were traded away and the team that ended up with that pick. It is possible the Eagles' pick ended up with this team via another team that the Eagles made a trade with. Not shown are acquired picks that the Eagles traded away.

= Pro Bowler	= Hall of Famer

Rd	Pick	Player	Position	School	Rd	Pick	Player	Position	School
1	7	Ebert Van Buren	Back	LSU	1	8	Chet Mutryn^{(From Detroit Lions)}	Back	Xavier
2	21	Pick Taken by	Washington	Redskins	3	32	Al Bruno	End	Kentucky
4	43	Fran Nagle	Back	Nebraska	5	57	Jack Dwyer	Back	Loyola (CA)
6	68	Ken Farragut	Center	Mississippi	7	79	Frank Boydston	Back	Baylor
8	93	Jack Richards	End	Arkansas	9	104	Denny Doyle	Guard	Tulane
10	116	Louis Schaufele	Back	Arkansas	11	130	Bob Pope	Tackle	Kentucky
12	141	Henry Rich	Back	Arizona State	13	152	Pete Mastellone	Center	Miami (FLA)
14	166	Bobby Walston	End	Georgia	15	177	Bobby North	Back	Georgia Tech
16	188	Hal Hatfield	End	USC	17	202	Hal Waggoner	Back	Tulane
18	213	Bill Weeks	Back	Iowa State	19	224	Jack Bove	Tackle	West Virginia
20	238	John Glorioso	Back	Missouri	21	249	Neal Franklin	Tackle	SMU
22	260	Jack Rucker	Back	Mississippi State	23	274	Jack Bighead	End	Pepperdine
24	285	Tony Kotowski	End	Mississippi State	25	296	Glenn Drahn	Back	Iowa
26	310	Billy Stewart	Back	Mississippi State	27	321	Bob Winship	Tackle	Rice
28	332	Marv Stendel	End	Arkansas	29	346	Roscoe Hansen	Tackle	North Carolina
30	357	John "Model-T" Ford	Quarterback	Hardin–Simmons					.

== Regular season ==
=== Schedule ===
Game	Date	Opponent	Result	Record	Venue	Attendance	Recap	Sources
1	September 30	at **Chicago Cardinals**	**W** 17–14	1–0	Comiskey Park	16,129	Recap	
2	October 6	San Francisco 49ers	**W** 21–14	2–0	Shibe Park	23,432	Recap	
3	October 14	at Green Bay Packers	**L** 24–37	2–1	City Stadium	18,489	Recap	
4	October 21	at **New York Giants**	**L** 24–26	2–2	Polo Grounds	28,656	Recap	
5	October 28	**Washington Redskins**	**L** 23–27	2–3	Shibe Park	20,437	Recap	
6	November 4	at **Pittsburgh Steelers**	**W** 34–13	3–3	Forbes Field	19,649	Recap	
7	November 11	at **Cleveland Browns**	**L** 17–20	3–4	Cleveland Stadium	36,571	Recap	
8	November 18	Detroit Lions	**L** 10–28	3–5	Shibe Park	25,350	Recap	
9	November 25	**Pittsburgh Steelers**	**L** 13–17	3–6	Shibe Park	15,537	Recap	
10	December 2	at **Washington Redskins**	**W** 35–21	4–6	Griffith Stadium	23,738	Recap	
11	December 9	**New York Giants**	**L** 7–23	4–7	Shibe Park	19,342	Recap	
12	December 16	**Cleveland Browns**	**L** 9–24	4–8	Shibe Park	16,263	Recap	
Note: Intra-conference opponents are in **bold** text.

== Game recaps ==
=== Game 2 vs San Francisco 49ers ===
Week 1: Philadelphia Eagles (2–0–0) vs San Francisco 49ers (1–1–0)

Quarter	1	2	3	4	Total
49ers	7	0	0	7	14
Eagles	7	0	7	7	21

at Shibe Park in Philadelphia, Pennsylvania

- Date: October 6, 1951
- Game time: 1:00 p.m. EST
- Game weather: degrees, wind mph

Game information

1st quarter

- 49ers – Verl Lillywhite 60 yard rush (Gordie Soltau kick), 49ers 7 – 0
- Eagles – Jim Parmer 4 yard rush (Bobby Walston kick), Tied 7 – 7

2nd quarter

- No Scoring

3rd quarter

- Eagles – Clyde Scott 49 yard pass from Adrian Burk (Bobby Walston kick), Eagles 14 – 7

4th quarter

- Eagles – Clyde Scott 28 yard pass from Adrian Burk (Bobby Walston kick), Eagles 21 – 7
- 49ers – Verl Lillywhite 11 yard pass from Y.A. Tittle (Gordie Soltau kick), Eagles 21–14

Team Stats

- First downs – SF 14 – Phila 13
- Rush-yards-TDs – SF 37–174–1 – Phila 34–97–1
- Comp-Att-Yd-TD-INT – SF 11–24–109–1–2 – Phila 14–28–239–2–2
- Sacked-yards – SF 2–20 – Phila 1–11
- Net pass yards – SF 89 – Phila 228
- Total yards – SF 263 – Phila 325
- Fumbles-lost – SF 3–2 – Phila 3–1
- Turnovers – SF 4 – Phila 3
- Penalties-yards – SF 3–35 – Phila 5–35

American Conference Standing

- Philadelphia (2–0–0)
- New York (1–0–1)
- Chicago Cards & Cleveland Browns (1–1–0)
- Pittsburgh (0–1–1)
- Washington (0–2–0)

=== Game 9 vs Pittsburgh Steelers ===
Week 1: Philadelphia Eagles (3–6–0) vs Pittsburgh Steelers (3–5–1)

Quarter	1	2	3	4	Total
Steelers	10	7	0	0	17
Eagles	0	6	0	7	13

at Shibe Park in Philadelphia, Pennsylvania

- Date: November 25, 1951
- Game time: 1:00 p.m. EST
- Game weather: degrees, wind mph

Game information

1st quarter

- Steelers – Joe Geri 24 yard field goal, Steelers 3 – 0
- Steelers – Fran Rogel 1 yard rush (Joe Geri kick), Steelers 10 – 0

2nd quarter

- Eagles – Pete Pihos 16 yard pass from Adrian Burk (kick failed) Steelers 10 – 6
- Steelers – Lynn Chandnois 37 yard pass from Chuck Ortmann (Joe Geri kick) Steelers 17 – 6

3rd quarter

- No Scoring

4th quarter

- Eagles – Jim Parmer 15 yard rush (Bobby Walston kick), Steelers 17 – 13

Team Stats

- First downs – Pitt 17 – Phila 18
- Rush-yards-TDs – Pitt 38–156–1 – Phila 46–164–1
- Comp-Att-Yd-TD-INT – Pitt 13–29–167–1–3 – Phila 11–28–145–1–4
- Sacked-yards – Pitt 0–0 – Phila 1–9
- Net pass yards – Pitt 167 – Phila 136
- Total yards – Pitt 323 – Phila 300
- Fumbles-lost – Pitt 1–0 – Phila 2–1
- Turnovers – Pitt 3 – Phila 5
- Penalties-yards – Pitt 4–30 – Phila 5–57

American Conference Standing

- Cleveland Browns (8–1–0)
- New York (6–2–1)
- Washington (4–5–0)
- Pittsburgh (3–5–1)
- Philadelphia (3–6–0)
- Chicago Cards (2–7–0)

=== Game 12 vs Cleveland Browns ===
The Eagles lost for the 4th time to the former AAFC member. They were out played by the American Conference champions Cleveland Browns, as they could only manage a net passing yard total of 8 yards for the game on 9 completions. The Eagles forced the Browns to turn the ball over 4 times, and sacked Otto Graham in the end zone for a safety as the only bright points of the game for the Eagles.

Week 1: Philadelphia Eagles (4–8) vs Cleveland Browns (11–1)

Quarter	1	2	3	4	Total
Browns	7	3	7	7	24
Eagles	0	0	2	7	9

at Shibe Park in Philadelphia, Pennsylvania

- Date: December 16, 1951
- Game time: 1:00 p.m. EST
- Game weather: degrees, wind mph

Game information

1st quarter

- Browns – Dante Lavelli 12 yard pass from Otto Graham (Lou Groza kick), Browns 7 – 0

2nd quarter

- Browns – Lou Groza 21 yard field goal Browns 10 – 0

3rd quarter

- Browns – Carl Taseff 1 yard rush (Lou Groza kick) Browns 17 – 0
- Eagles – Safety, Graham tackled in end zone by Stickel Browns 17 – 2

4th quarter

- Browns – Rex Bumgardner 18 yard pass from Otto Graham (Lou Groza kick) Browns 24 – 2
- Eagles – Bobby Walston 11 yard pass from Adrian Burk (Bobby Walston kick), Browns 24 – 9

Team Stats

- First downs – Cleve 15 – Phila 9
- Rush-yards-TDs – Cleve 32–96–1 – Phila 30–65–0
- Comp-Att-Yd-TD-INT – Cleve 12–29–179–2–1 – Phila 9–24–96–1–0
- Sacked-yards – Cleve 4–32 – Phila 10–88
- Net pass yards – Cleve 147 – Phila 8
- Total yards – Cleve 243 – Phila 73
- Fumbles-lost – Cleve 3–3 – Phila 5–2
- Turnovers – Cleve 4 – Phila 2
- Penalties-yards – Cleve 8–74 – Phila 2–10

American Conference Standing

- Cleveland Browns (8–1–0)
- New York (6–2–1)
- Washington (4–5–0)
- Pittsburgh (3–5–1)
- Philadelphia (3–6–0)
- Chicago Cardinals (2–7–0)

== Standings ==
Program for the November 25 game with the visiting Pittsburgh Steelers.

NFL American Conference
	W	L	T	PCT	CONF	PF	PA	STK
Cleveland Browns	11	1	0	.917	9–0	331	152	W11
New York Giants	9	2	1	.818	7–2–1	254	161	W4
Washington Redskins	5	7	0	.417	4–5	183	296	L1
Pittsburgh Steelers	4	7	1	.364	3–5–1	183	235	W1
Philadelphia Eagles	4	8	0	.333	3–6	234	264	L2
Chicago Cardinals	3	9	0	.250	0–8	210	287	W1

Note: Tie games were not officially counted in the standings until 1972.

== Playoffs ==
The Philadelphia eagles finished with a 4–8–0 record and failed to make it to the 1951 NFL Championship Game. The game was played between the Cleveland Browns and Los Angeles Rams in Los Angeles on December 23, 1951, with an attendance of 59,475.

== Roster ==
(All time List of Philadelphia Eagles players in franchise history)

= 1951 Pro Bowl	= Hall of Famer

NO.	Player	AGE	POS	GP	GS	WT	HT	YRS	College
	Bo McMillin	56	Coach	2	_{record} 2–0	163	5–9	1st	Centre
	Wayne Millner	38	Coach	10	_{record} 2–8	189	6–1	1st	Notre Dame
80	Neill Armstrong	25	E-DB	12		189	6–2	4	Oklahoma State
74	Walt Barnes	33	G	12		238	6–1	3	LSU
60	Chuck Bednarik+	26	LB-C	12		233	6–3	2	Pennsylvania
10	Adrian Burk	24	QB-Punter	12	12	190	6–2	1	Baylor
36	Gerry Cowhig	30	LB-FB-DB	11		215	6–2	4	Notre Dame
33	Russ Craft	32	DB-HB	12		178	5–9	5	Alabama
53	Ken Farragut	23	C-LB	11		240	6–4	Rookie	Mississippi
64	Mario Giannelli	31	MG-G	10		265	6–0	3	Boston College
86	Bud Grant	24	E-DE	12		199	6–3	Rookie	Minnesota
89	John Green	30	DE-E	1	0	192	6–1	4	Tulsa
73	Roscoe Hansen	22	T-DT	9		215	6–3	Rookie	North Carolina
78	Mike Jarmoluk	29	DT-T-MG	12		232	6–5	5	Temple
76	Bucko Kilroy	30	G-MG-T-DT	12		243	6–2	8	_{Notre Dame; Temple}
52	Vic Lindskog+	37	C	11		203	6–1	7	Stanford
88	Jay MacDowell	32	T-DE	12		217	6–2	5	Washington
39	Bill Mackrides	26	QB	6		182	5–11	4	Nevada-Reno
67	John Magee	28	G	12		220	5–10	3	_{La-Lafayette, Rice}
49	Pat McHugh	32	DB-HB	8		166	5–11	4	Georgia Tech
81	Red O'Quinn	26	DB-E	5		195	6–2	1	Wake Forest
43	Jim Parmer	25	FB-HB	11		193	6–0	3	_{Oklahoma State, Texas A&M}
35	Pete Pihos	28	E-DE	12		210	6–1	4	Indiana
21	Al Pollard	23	HB-FB	6		196	6–0	Rookie	_{Army, Loyola Marymount}
30	Bosh Pritchard	32	HB	6		164	5–11	9	Georgia Tech, VMI
11	John Rauch	24	QB-DB	4		195	6–1	2	Georgia
40	Frank Reagan	32	B	12		182	5–11	10	Pennsylvania
68	Ray Romero	24	G	7		213	5–11	Rookie	Kansas State
31	Dan Sandifer	24	DB-HB	12		190	6–1	3	LSU
27	Clyde Scott	27	HB-DB	12		174	6–0	2	Arkansas, Navy
79	Vic Sears	33	T-DT	12		223	6–3	10	Oregon State
72	Dick Steere	24	G	5		240	6–4	Rookie	Drake
75	Walt Stickel	29	T-DT	11		247	6–3	5	_{Pennsylvania; Tulsa}
45	Joe Sutton	27	DB-HB	11		180	5–11	2	Temple
17	Ebert Van Buren	27	DB-LB-FB-HB	12		210	6–2	Rookie	LSU
15	Steve Van Buren	31	HB	10		200	6–0	7	LSU
83	Bobby Walston	23	E-HB-K	12		190	6–0	Rookie	Georgia
44	Norm Willey	24	DE-G-E	11		224	6–2	1	Marshall
70	Al Wistert	31	G-T-DT	12		214	6–1	8	Michigan
41	Frank Ziegler	28	HB-DB	12	0	175	5–11	2	Georgia Tech
	38 Players; Team Average	27.8		12		206.1	6–1.0	3.4	

- Bo McMillin resigned after 2nd game because of stomach cancer
- Bud Grant is also in Canadian Football Hall of Fame

== Postseason ==
- Wayne Millner resigns before 1952 season after training camp
