= Don Murry =

American football player (1899–1951)

No. 18
- Positions: Tackle, end, guard

Personal information
- Born: October 5, 1899; Taylorville, Illinois, U.S.
- Died: June 30, 1951 (aged 51); Chicago, Illinois, U.S.
- Listed height: 6 ft 2 in (1.88 m)
- Listed weight: 191 lb (87 kg)

Career information
- High school: Taylorville (IL), Edgerton (WI)
- College: Wisconsin

Career history
- Racine Legion (1922–1924); Chicago Bears (1925–1932)

Awards and highlights
- NFL champion (1932)

Career statistics
- Games played: 112
- Games started: 75
- Touchdowns: 1
- Stats at Pro Football Reference

Donald Franklin Murry (October 5, 1899 – June 30, 1951) was an American professional football guard for the Racine Legion and Chicago Bears of the National Football League (NFL).
