= 1951 Pittsburgh Steelers season =

NFL team season

- Head coach: John Michelosen
- Home stadium: Forbes Field

Results
- Record: 4–7–1
- Division place: 4th NFL American
- Playoffs: Did not qualify

The 1951 Pittsburgh Steelers season was the franchise's 19th in the National Football League.

== Regular season ==
=== Schedule ===
Week	Date	Opponent	Result	Record
1	October 1	New York Giants	T 13–13	0–0–1
2	October 7	at Green Bay Packers	L 33–35	0–1–1
3	October 14	San Francisco 49ers	L 24–28	0–2–1
4	October 21	at Cleveland Browns	L 0–17	0–3–1
5	October 28	at Chicago Cardinals	W 28–14	1–3–1
6	November 4	Philadelphia Eagles	L 13–34	1–4–1
7	November 11	Green Bay Packers	W 28–7	2–4–1
8	November 18	Washington Redskins	L 7–22	2–5–1
9	November 25	at Philadelphia Eagles	W 17–13	3–5–1
10	December 2	at New York Giants	L 0–14	3–6–1
11	December 9	Cleveland Browns	L 0–28	3–7–1
12	December 16	at Washington Redskins	W 20–10	4–7–1

=== Game summaries ===
==== Week 1 (Monday October 1, 1951): New York Giants ====
	1	2	3	4	Total
Giants	3	7	3	0	13
Steelers	3	7	3	0	13

at Forbes Field, Pittsburgh, Pennsylvania

- Game time:
- Game weather:
- Game attendance: 27,984
- Referee:
- TV announcers:

Scoring drives:

- Pittsburgh – FG Geri 31
- New York Giants – FG Poole 11
- New York Giants – Scott 56 pass from Tidwell (Poole kick)
- Pittsburgh – Geri 1 run (Geri kick)
- Pittsburgh – FG Geri 26
- New York Giants – FG Poole 21

==== Week 2 (Sunday October 7, 1951): Green Bay Packers ====
	1	2	3	4	Total
Steelers	0	23	10	0	33
Packers	21	7	0	7	35

at City Stadium, Green Bay, Wisconsin

- Game time:
- Game weather:
- Game attendance: 8,324
- Referee:
- TV announcers:

Scoring drives:

- Green Bay – Grimes 18 run (Cone kick)
- Green Bay – Mann 40 pass from Rote (Cone kick)
- Green Bay – Pelfrey 20 pass from Thomason (Cone kick)
- Green Bay – Rote 1 run (Cone kick)
- Pittsburgh – Chandnois 33 pass from Ortmann (Geri kick)
- Pittsburgh – Chandnois 2 run (Geri kick)
- Pittsburgh – Rogel 1 run (Geri kick)
- Pittsburgh – Safety, Cloud tackled by Mehelich in end zone
- Pittsburgh – Finks 25 interception (Geri kick)
- Pittsburgh – FG Geri 26
- Green Bay – Mann 16 pass from Rote (Cone kick)

==== Week 3 (Sunday October 14, 1951): San Francisco 49ers ====
	1	2	3	4	Total
49ers	7	0	21	0	28
Steelers	0	10	0	14	24

at Forbes Field, Pittsburgh, Pennsylvania

- Game time:
- Game weather:
- Game attendance: 27,307
- Referee:
- TV announcers:

'Scoring drives:

- San Francisco – Cason 65 interception (Soltau kick)
- Pittsburgh – Nickel 77 pass from Geri (Geri kick)
- Pittsburgh – FG Geri 16
- San Francisco – Monachino 7 run (Soltau kick)
- San Francisco – Perry 4 pass from Albert (Soltau kick)
- San Francisco – Schabarum 8 run (Soltau kick)
- Pittsburgh – Chandnois 8 pass from Mathews (Geri kick)
- Pittsburgh – Nickel 22 pass from Mathews (Geri kick)

==== Week 4 (Sunday October 21, 1951): Cleveland Browns ====
	1	2	3	4	Total
Steelers	0	0	0	0	0
Browns	0	10	7	0	17

at Cleveland Municipal Stadium, Cleveland, Ohio

- Game time:
- Game weather:
- Game attendance: 32,409
- Referee:
- TV announcers:

Scoring drives:

- Cleveland – Gillom 38 fumble run (Groza kick)
- Cleveland – FG Groza 25
- Cleveland – Lahr 27 interception (Groza kick)

==== Week 5 (Sunday October 28, 1951): Chicago Cardinals ====
	1	2	3	4	Total
Steelers	0	7	0	21	28
Cardinals	0	0	14	0	14

at Comiskey Park, Chicago, Illinois

- Game time:
- Game weather:
- Game attendance: 14,773
- Referee:
- TV announcers:

Scoring drives:

- Pittsburgh – Jansante 46 pass from Geri (Geri kick)
- Chicago Cardinals – Cross 1 run (Patton kick)
- Chicago Cardinals – Cross 7 run (Patton kick)
- Pittsburgh – Geri 49 pass from Chandnois (Geri kick)
- Pittsburgh – Nickel 33 pass from Ortmann (Geri kick)
- Pittsburgh – Butler 52 interception (Geri run)

==== Week 6 (Sunday November 4, 1951): Philadelphia Eagles ====
	1	2	3	4	Total
Eagles	0	14	13	7	34
Steelers	3	7	3	0	13

at Forbes Field, Pittsburgh, Pennsylvania

- Game time:
- Game weather:
- Game attendance: 19,649
- Referee:
- TV announcers:

Scoring Drives:

- Pittsburgh – FG Geri 22
- Pittsburgh – Shipkey 20 interception (Geri kick)
- Philadelphia – Walston 26 pass from Burk (Waltson kick)
- Philadelphia – Pihos 12 pass from Burk (Walston kick)
- Pittsburgh – FG Geri 40
- Philadelphia – S. Van Buren 2 run (kick failed)
- Philadelphia – Cowhig 25 fumble run (Walston kick)
- Philadelphia – Sandifer 30 pass from Burk (Walston kick)

==== Week 7 (Sunday November 11, 1951): Green Bay Packers ====
	1	2	3	4	Total
Packers	0	0	0	7	7
Steelers	14	7	0	7	28

at Forbes Field, Pittsburgh, Pennsylvania

- Game time:
- Game weather:
- Game attendance: 20,080
- Referee:
- TV announcers:

Scoring drives:

- Pittsburgh – Chandnois 13 run (Geri kick)
- Pittsburgh – Nuzum 3 run (Geri kick)
- Pittsburgh – Geri 3 run (Geri kick)
- Pittsburgh – Minarik 35 pass from Chandnois (Geri kick)
- Green Bay – Mann 20 pass from Rote (Cone kick)

==== Week 8 (Sunday November 18, 1951): Washington Redskins ====
	1	2	3	4	Total
Redskins	0	6	3	13	22
Steelers	0	7	0	0	7

at Forbes Field, Pittsburgh, Pennsylvania

- Game time:
- Game weather:
- Game attendance: 15,060
- Referee:
- TV announcers:

Scoring drives:

- Washington – Goode 2 run (kick blocked)
- Pittsburgh – Mathews 68 punt return (Geri kick)
- Washington – FG Dudley 30
- Washington – FG Dudley 37
- Washington – FG Dudley 37
- Washington – Goode 10 run (Dudley kick)

==== Week 9 (Sunday November 25, 1951): Philadelphia Eagles ====
	1	2	3	4	Total
Steelers	10	7	0	0	17
Eagles	0	6	0	7	13

at Shibe Park, Philadelphia, Pennsylvania

- Game time:
- Game weather:
- Game attendance: 15,537
- Referee:
- TV announcers:

Scoring drives:

- Pittsburgh – FG Geri 24
- Pittsburgh – Rogel 1 run (Geri kick)
- Philadelphia – Pihos 16 pass from Burk (kick blocked)
- Pittsburgh – Chandnois 37 pass from Ortmann (Geri kick)
- Philadelphia – Parmer 15 run (Walston kick)

==== Week 10 (Sunday December 2, 1951): New York Giants ====
	1	2	3	4	Total
Steelers	0	0	0	0	0
Giants	0	7	0	7	14

at Polo Grounds, New York, New York

- Game time:
- Game weather:
- Game attendance: 19,196
- Referee:
- TV announcers:

Scoring drives:

- New York Giants – Landry 9 fumble run (Poole kick)
- New York Giants – Schnellbacher 46 interception (Poole kick)

==== Week 11 (Sunday December 9, 1951): Cleveland Browns ====
	1	2	3	4	Total
Browns	0	21	0	7	28
Steelers	0	0	0	0	0

at Forbes Field, Pittsburgh, Pennsylvania

- Game time:
- Game weather:
- Game attendance: 24,229
- Referee:
- TV announcers:

Scoring drives:

- Cleveland – Carpenter 24 run (Groza kick)
- Cleveland – Motley 8 run (Groza kick)
- Cleveland – Lavelli 7 pass from Graham (Groza kick)
- Cleveland – Taseff 3 run (Groza kick)

==== Week 13 (Sunday December 16, 1951): Washington Redskins ====
	1	2	3	4	Total
Steelers	0	0	0	20	20
Redskins	3	7	0	0	10

at Griffith Stadium, Washington, DC

- Game time:
- Game weather:
- Game attendance: 18,969
- Referee:
- TV announcers:

Scoring drives:

- Washington – FG Dudley 15
- Washington – Tereshinski 16 pass from Baugh (Dudley kick)
- Pittsburgh – Chandnois 40 pass from Finks (Geri kick)
- Pittsburgh – Rogel 3 run (Geri kick)
- Pittsburgh – Geri 4 run (kick failed)

== Standings ==
NFL American Conference
	W	L	T	PCT	CONF	PF	PA	STK
Cleveland Browns	11	1	0	.917	9–0	331	152	W11
New York Giants	9	2	1	.818	7–2–1	254	161	W4
Washington Redskins	5	7	0	.417	4–5	183	296	L1
Pittsburgh Steelers	4	7	1	.364	3–5–1	183	235	W1
Philadelphia Eagles	4	8	0	.333	3–6	234	264	L2
Chicago Cardinals	3	9	0	.250	0–8	210	287	W1

Note: Tie games were not officially counted in the standings until 1972.

== Roster ==
1951 Pittsburgh Steelers final roster
Running backs: 14 Lynn Chandnois; 35 Joe Geri K/P; 25 Dick Hendley; 44 Ray Mathews S; 22 Jerry Nuzum; 27 Fran Rogel; 30 Truett Smith; Receivers: 82 Henry Minarik; 81 Elbie Nickel	Offensive linemen: 73 Lou Allen T; 65 George Hughes G; 72 Paul Lea T; 55 Tony Momsen C; 62 Dick Tomlinson G; 56 Bill Walsh C; 79 Frank Wydo T; Defensive linemen: 60 Dale Dodrill MG; 75 George Hays DE/DT; 86 Tom Jelley DE/WR; 84 Bill McPeak DE; 78 Carl Samuelson DT; 70 Ernie Stautner DT; 68 John Schweder MG	Linebackers: 63 Darrell Hogan MLB; 42 Joe Hollingsworth OLB/FB; 33 Jerry Shipkey OLB/FB; 57 Frank Sinkovitz OLB; Defensive backs: 80 Jack Butler CB; 11 Howard Hartley CB; 7 Jim Finks S/CB/RB; 49 Chuck Ortmann S/RB; Reserve: 86 Charley Mehelich DE (NF-Ill.); -- Walt Szot DT (Military); Rookies in italics
