= Ace Loomis =

American football player (1928–2003)

No. 7, 43, 48
- Positions: Defensive back, halfback

Personal information
- Born: June 12, 1928; Dubuque, Iowa, U.S.
- Died: September 11, 2003 (aged 75); Santa Fe, New Mexico, U.S.
- Listed height: 6 ft 1 in (1.85 m)
- Listed weight: 190 lb (86 kg)

Career information
- High school: Merrillan
- College: Wisconsin–La Crosse
- NFL draft: 1951: 5th round, 62nd overall pick

Career history
- Green Bay Packers (1951–1953)

Career NFL statistics
- Interceptions: 12
- Fumble recoveries: 5
- Total touchdowns: 1
- Stats at Pro Football Reference

Ace Darl Loomis (June 12, 1928 – September 11, 2003) was an American professional football defensive back and halfback in the National Football League (NFL) who played for the Green Bay Packers. Loomis was selected in the fifth round of the 1951 NFL draft out of the University of Wisconsin–La Crosse by the Cleveland Browns. He played three years for the Packers and retired in 1953.
