= 1951 Chicago Bears season =

NFL team season

- Owner: George Halas
- Head coach: George Halas
- Home stadium: Wrigley Field

Results
- Record: 7–5
- Division place: 4th NFL National
- Playoffs: Did not qualify

The 1951 season was the Chicago Bears' 32nd in the National Football League. The team failed to improve on their 9–3 record from 1950 and finished at 7–5 under head coach and owner George Halas, fourth in the NFL's National Conference, but only a game behind winner Los Angeles, the eventual league champion. This season was a drop off from the previous season's tiebreaker playoff appearance.

The Bears lost twice to the crosstown Cardinals, who won just three games. The season finale was played in frigid conditions at Wrigley Field and cost the Bears a share of the conference title.

== Regular season ==
=== Schedule ===
Week	Date	Opponent	Result	Record	Venue	Attendance
1	September 30	at **Green Bay Packers**	**W** 31–20	1–0	City Stadium	24,666
2	October 7	at Chicago Cardinals	**L** 14–28	1–1	Comiskey Park	33,781
3	October 14	**New York Yanks**	**W** 24–21	2–1	Wrigley Field	37,697
4	October 21	**San Francisco 49ers**	**W** 13–7	3–1	Wrigley Field	42,296
5	October 28	at **Detroit Lions**	**W** 28–23	4–1	Briggs Stadium	34,778
6	November 4	at Washington Redskins	**W** 27–0	5–1	Griffith Stadium	21,737
7	November 11	**Detroit Lions**	**L** 28–41	5–2	Wrigley Field	43,709
8	November 18	**Green Bay Packers**	**W** 24–13	6–2	Wrigley Field	36,771
9	November 25	at Cleveland Browns	**L** 21–42	6–3	Cleveland Municipal Stadium	40,969
10	December 2	**Los Angeles Rams**	**L** 17–42	6–4	Wrigley Field	50,286
11	December 9	at **New York Yanks**	**W** 45–21	7–4	Yankee Stadium	13,075
12	December 16	Chicago Cardinals	**L** 14–24	7–5	Wrigley Field	15,085
Note: Intra-conference opponents are in **bold** text.

=== Game summaries ===
==== Week 1 ====
Team	1	2	3	4	Total
• Bears	10	7	7	7	31
Packers	0	6	7	7	20

- Date: September 30
- Location: City Stadium, Green Bay, Wisconsin
- Game attendance: 24,666

Scoring summary
Q1	CHI	White 8 yard run (Lujack kick)	CHI 7–0
Q1	CHI	Blanda 46 yard field goal	CHI 10–0
Q2	CHI	Rykovich 1 yard run (Lujack kick)	CHI 17–0
Q2	GB	Mann 12 yard pass from Thomason	CHI 17–6
Q3	CHI	Dottley 1 yard run (Lujack kick)	CHI 24–6
Q3	GB	Cloud 1 yard pass from Thomason (Cone kick)	CHI 24–13
Q4	CHI	Hunsinger 5 yard run (Lujack kick)	CHI 31–13
Q4	GB	Cloud 1 yard run (Cone kick)	CHI 31–20

=== Standings ===
NFL National Conference
	W	L	T	PCT	CONF	PF	PA	STK
Los Angeles Rams	8	4	0	.667	7–2	392	261	W1
San Francisco 49ers	7	4	1	.636	5–2–1	255	205	W3
Detroit Lions	7	4	1	.636	5–4–1	336	259	L1
Chicago Bears	7	5	0	.583	6–2	286	282	L1
Green Bay Packers	3	9	0	.250	1–8	254	375	L7
New York Yanks	1	9	2	.100	1–7–2	241	382	L2

Note: Tie games were not officially counted in the standings until 1972.

== Roster ==
Chicago Bears 1951 roster
Quarterbacks: 32 Johnny Lujack CB; 12 Steve Romanik; 9 Bob Williams; Running backs: 57 J. R. Boone; 34 Kayo Dottley; 39 George Gulyanics; 46 Chuck Hunsinger; 15 Fred Morrison P; 11 Julie Rykovich; 33 Wilford White K; Receivers: 29 John Hoffman LB; 20 Jim Keane	Offensive linemen: 26 Dick Barwegen G; 81 George Connor T/LB; 40 Frank Dempsey G/DT/LB; 55 Bob Moser C/MG; 23 Wash Serini G; 68 Jerry Stautberg G; 35 Paul Stenn T; 66 Bulldog Turner C; Defensive linemen: 82 Ray Bray MG/G; 89 Les Cowan DT/DE; 24 Fred Davis DT/T; 14 Wayne Hansen DT; 7 Ed Sprinkle DE/WR; 53 Bill Wightkin DE/WR	Linebackers: 22 George Blanda K; 31 Stu Clarkson; Defensive backs: 6 Don Kindt CB/FB; 37 Red O'Quinn S; 86 Brad Rowland CB/RB; 88 Gene Schroeder S/WR; 45 Billy Stone S/RB	Reserve list: 10 Al Campana CB/RB (IR); 58 Ed Neal MG (IR); Rookies in italics
