= 1951 Green Bay Packers season =

NFL team season

- Head coach: Gene Ronzani
- Home stadium: City Stadium; Wisconsin State Fair Park

Results
- Record: 3–9
- Division place: 5th National
- Playoffs: Did not qualify

The 1951 Green Bay Packers season was their 33rd season overall and their 31st season in the National Football League. The team finished with a 3–9 record under second-year coach Gene Ronzani for a fifth-place finish in the National Conference. The Packers lost the final seven games of the season.

The Packers played their Milwaukee home games in Wisconsin State Fair Park for the final time, a venue they had used since 1934. Marquette Stadium was used for one season in 1952 and the new County Stadium was the host venue from 1953 through 1994.

The Packers' 478 passing attempts (39.8 per game) in 1951 are the most by an NFL team in the 1950s.

== Offseason ==
=== NFL draft ===
Round	Pick	Player	Position	School/club team
1	5	Bob Gain	Tackle	Kentucky
2	16	Albin Collins	Halfback	LSU
3	27	Fred Cone	Running back	Clemson
5	52	Wade Stinson	Back	Kansas
6	63	Sig Holowenko	Tackle	John Carroll
7	77	Bill Sutherland	End	St. Vincent
9	99	Dick McWilliams	Tackle	Michigan
10	114	Bob Noppinger	Tackle	Georgetown
11	125	George Rooks	Back	Morgan State
12	136	Carl Kreager	Center	Michigan
13	150	Ed Stephens	Back	Missouri
14	161	Ray Bauer	End	Montana
15	172	Joe Ernst	Back	Tulane
16	186	William Afflis	Offensive tackle	Nevada
17	197	Ray Pelfrey	Wide receiver	Eastern Kentucky
18	208	Ed Petela	Back	Boston College
19	222	Jim Liber	Back	Xavier
20	233	Dick Johnson	Tackle	Virginia
21	244	Art Edling	End	Minnesota
22	258	Art Felker	End	Marquette
23	269	Tubba Chamberlain	Guard	Wisconsin–Eau Claire
24	280	Dick Christie	Back	Nebraska–Omaha
25	294	Monte Charles	Back	Hillsdale
26	305	Bill Miller	Tackle	Ohio State
27	316	Bob Bossons	Center	Georgia Tech
28	330	Bill Ayre	Back	Abilene Christian
29	341	Ralph Fieler	End	Miami (FL)
30	352	Ed Withers	Back	Wisconsin

- Yellow indicates a future Pro Bowl selection

== Regular season ==
=== Schedule ===
Week	Date	Opponent	Result	Record	Venue	Attendance
1	September 30	**Chicago Bears**	**L** 20–31	0–1	City Stadium	24,666
2	October 7	Pittsburgh Steelers	**W** 35–33	1–1	State Fair Park	8,324
3	October 14	Philadelphia Eagles	**W** 37–24	2–1	City Stadium	18,489
4	October 21	**Los Angeles Rams**	**L** 0–28	2–2	State Fair Park	21,393
5	October 28	at **New York Yanks**	**W** 29–27	3–2	Yankee Stadium	7,351
6	November 4	**Detroit Lions**	**L** 17–24	3–3	City Stadium	18,800
7	November 11	at Pittsburgh Steelers	**L** 7–28	3–4	Forbes Field	20,080
8	November 18	at **Chicago Bears**	**L** 13–24	3–5	Wrigley Field	36,771
9	November 22	at **Detroit Lions**	**L** 35–52	3–6	Briggs Stadium	32,247
10	December 2	**New York Yanks**	**L** 28–31	3–7	City Stadium	14,297
11	December 9	at **San Francisco 49ers**	**L** 19–31	3–8	Kezar Stadium	15,121
12	December 16	at **Los Angeles Rams**	**L** 14–42	3–9	Los Angeles Memorial Coliseum	23,698
Note: Intra-conference opponents are in **bold** text.

== Standings ==
NFL National Conference
	W	L	T	PCT	CONF	PF	PA	STK
Los Angeles Rams	8	4	0	.667	7–2	392	261	W1
San Francisco 49ers	7	4	1	.636	5–2–1	255	205	W3
Detroit Lions	7	4	1	.636	5–4–1	336	259	L1
Chicago Bears	7	5	0	.583	6–2	286	282	L1
Green Bay Packers	3	9	0	.250	1–8	254	375	L7
New York Yanks	1	9	2	.100	1–7–2	241	382	L2

Note: Tie games were not officially counted in the standings until 1972.

== Roster ==
1951 Green Bay Packers final roster
Quarterbacks: 38 Tobin Rote; 28 Bobby Thomason; Running backs: 3 Tony Canadeo; 66 Fred Cone K; 22 Billy Grimes; 93 Dom Moselle S; 80 Breezy Reid; Receivers: 40 Carlton Elliott DE; 23 Val Jansante; 31 Bob Mann; 79 Dick Moje; 8 Ray Pelfrey P	Offensive linemen: 21 Ray DiPierro G; 55 Ed Ecker T/DT; 90 Leon Manley T; 85 Jay Rhodemyre C; 34 Joe Spencer T; 44 Dave Stephenson G; Defensive linemen: 15 Dick Afflis MG; 39 John Martinkovic DE; 49 Dan Orlich DE/WR; 75 Howie Ruetz DT; 45 Dick Wildung DT/T; 16 Abner Wimberly DE/WR	Linebackers: 35 Walt Michaels MLB/G; 86 Bill Schroll OLB; 17 Carl Schuette LB/C; 77 Bob Summerhays OLB; Defensive backs: 65 Rip Collins CB; 25 Harper Davis S; 36 Jug Girard P/S/CB/RB; 7 Ace Loomis CB; 74 Rebel Steiner CB	Reserve: 33 Buddy Burris G/MG (IR); 82 Jack Cloud RB (IR); -- Bob Forte OLB/RB/P (Military); 46 Hamilton Nichols G (IR); -- Len Szafaryn G (Military); -- Clayton Tonnemaker LB/C (Military); Rookies in italics
