= 1951 Detroit Lions season =

NFL team season

- Head coach: Buddy Parker
- Home stadium: Briggs Stadium

Results
- Record: 7–4–1
- Division place: T-2nd NFL National
- Playoffs: Did not qualify

The 1951 Detroit Lions season was their 22nd in the league. It was the first season under Buddy Parker as head coach. They were 7–4–1, tied for second in the National Conference, a half game behind the Los Angeles Rams. A loss at San Francisco in the regular season finale cost the Lions the conference title, and they failed to qualify for the playoffs for a sixteenth consecutive season. The team improved on their previous season's output of 6–6.

In their 52–35 win over the Green Bay Packers on Thanksgiving, Detroit became the first team in NFL history to score three touchdowns of 70 yards or more in one quarter (a run and two punt returns in the third period). It was the first of thirteen consecutive appearances for the Packers in Detroit on Thanksgiving, through 1963.

== Regular season ==
According to the team, a total of 10,094 season tickets were sold by the Lions for the 1951 campaign. The Lions played their home games in Briggs Stadium (Tiger Stadium), which had a regular listed seating capacity of 46,194, with an additional 7,000 bleacher seats for football to bring total capacity to 53,194.

=== Schedule ===
Week	Date	Opponent	Result	Record	Venue	Attendance
1	September 30	Washington Redskins	**W** 35–17	1–0	Briggs Stadium	27,831
2	October 8	**New York Yanks**	**W** 37–10	2–0	Briggs Stadium	24,194
3	October 14	**Los Angeles Rams**	**L** 21–27	2–1	Briggs Stadium	50,567
4	October 21	**New York Yanks**	**T** 24–24	2–1–1	Briggs Stadium	21,807
5	October 28	**Chicago Bears**	**L** 23–28	2–2–1	Briggs Stadium	34,778
6	November 4	at **Green Bay Packers**	**W** 24–17	3–2–1	City Stadium	18,165
7	November 11	at **Chicago Bears**	**W** 41–28	4–2–1	Wrigley Field	43,709
8	November 18	at Philadelphia Eagles	**W** 28–10	5–2–1	Shibe Park	25,098
9	November 22	**Green Bay Packers**	**W** 52–35	6–2–1	Briggs Stadium	32,247
10	December 2	**San Francisco 49ers**	**L** 10–20	6–3–1	Briggs Stadium	45,757
11	December 9	at **Los Angeles Rams**	**W** 24–22	7–3–1	Los Angeles Memorial Coliseum	52,937
12	December 16	at **San Francisco 49ers**	**L** 17–21	7–4–1	Kezar Stadium	26,465
Note: Intra-conference opponents are in **bold** text

- Monday night (October 8), Thursday (November 22: Thanksgiving)

== Standings ==
NFL National Conference
	W	L	T	PCT	CONF	PF	PA	STK
Los Angeles Rams	8	4	0	.667	7–2	392	261	W1
San Francisco 49ers	7	4	1	.636	5–2–1	255	205	W3
Detroit Lions	7	4	1	.636	5–4–1	336	259	L1
Chicago Bears	7	5	0	.583	6–2	286	282	L1
Green Bay Packers	3	9	0	.250	1–8	254	375	L7
New York Yanks	1	9	2	.100	1–7–2	241	382	L2

Note: Tie games were not officially counted in the standings until 1972.

== Roster ==
Detroit Lions 1951 roster
Quarterbacks: 22 Bobby Layne; 24 Fred Enke; Running backs: 30 Ollie Cline; 16 Pete D'Alonzo; 34 Pat Harder K; 14 Bob Hoernschemeyer; 42 Lindy Pearson; 30 Doak Walker K; Receivers: 84 Dorne Dibble CB; 82 Leon Hart DE; 88 Bill Swiacki	Linemen/Linebackers: 51 Vince Banonis C/LB; 85 Ed Berrang DE; 65 Les Bingaman C/MG; 70 Gus Cifelli T; 76 Lou Creekmur G; 83 Jim Doran DE/WR; 74 Dick Flanagan LB/G; 67 Barry French G/T; 72 Floyd Jaszewski T/DT; 55 Jack Lininger LB; 89 Jim Martin T/DE; 73 Thurman McGraw DT; 63 Bob Momsen MG; 75 John Prchlik DT; 64 Dan Rogas G; 53 LaVern Torgeson LB/C	Defensive backs: 19 Jack Christiansen S; 44 Don Doll S; 12 Jim Hill CB/S; 35 Art Murakowski S; 11 Clarence Self CB; 40 Bob Smith CB/P; Reserve lists: -- Cloyce Box WR (Military); -- Jim Cain DE (Military); -- Dick Stanfel G (IR); -- Wally Triplett RB/CB (Military); rookies in italics
