= 1951 NFL season =

American football season

Regular season
- Duration: September 28 – December 16, 1951
- American Conf. Champions: Cleveland Browns
- National Conf. Champions: Los Angeles Rams

Championship Game
- Champions: Los Angeles Rams

NFL teams: National, American

The 1951 NFL season was the 32nd regular season of the National Football League. Before the season, Baltimore Colts owner Abraham Watner faced financial difficulties, and thus folded his team and gave its player contracts back to the league for $50,000. However, many Baltimore fans started to protest the loss of their team. Supporting groups such as its fan club and its marching band remained in operation and worked for the team's revival, which eventually led to a new, more lucrative Baltimore expansion team named the Colts in 1953.

For the first time, the NFL Championship Game was televised across the nation. The DuMont Television Network paid $75,000 to broadcast the game. Viewers coast-to-coast watched the Los Angeles Rams defeat the Cleveland Browns 24–17.

== Draft ==
The 1951 NFL draft was held from January 18–19, 1951 at Chicago's Blackstone Hotel. With the first pick, the New York Giants selected halfback Kyle Rote from Southern Methodist University.

== Major rule changes ==
- No offensive tackle, guard, or center would be eligible to catch or touch a forward pass.
- Aluminum shoe cleats are banned.

== Deaths ==
- June 30 - Don Murry, age 51. Played Offensive Line for the Racine Legion and Chicago Bears in an NFL career that lasted from 1922-1932.

== Regular season ==
=== Highlights ===
- In Week One (September 30), the defending champions, the Cleveland Browns, opened with a loss, falling to their old AAFC rival in San Francisco, 24–10; the Giants tied the Steelers 13–13 in a Monday night game on national radio.
- Week Four (October 21) in Detroit, the Lions had a 24–17 win cancelled when the New York Yanks tied the game, which would be important later.
- In Week Five (October 28), The Browns beat the Giants 14–13 on a missed extra point, putting Cleveland half a game ahead to lead the American Division. In Detroit, the Bears' Ed Sprinkle blocked a punt that Bill Wightkin fell on in the end zone for a 28–23 victory, while the Rams lost 44–17 to the 49ers, giving the Bears the lead in the National.
- Week Seven (November 11) saw the Browns trailing the Eagles at home before preserving their American Division lead with a 20–17 win. The Rams' 45–21 win over the Cardinals, and the Bears' 41–28 loss to the Lions, gave the Rams and Bears 5–2–0 records.
- In Week Eight (November 18), the Giants hosted a rematch with the Browns and lost again, 10–0; the Giants would finish 9–2–1, with both losses courtesy of the 11–1–0 Browns.
- Week Nine began with a Thursday night game in Detroit, in which the Lions beat Green Bay, 52–35, to raise its record to 6–2–1. On (November 25), the Browns beat the Bears, 42–21, in Cleveland. The Browns were penalized 22 times, but still salvaged the victory. Consequently, the 22 in-game infractions committed by the Browns made Cleveland the first NFL team to win a game, despite being penalized that many times. The Rams also lost, 31–21, at Washington, and both fell to 6–3–0, giving the Lions the National Division lead. Meanwhile, the New York Yanks played spoiler again, tying the 49ers, 10–10, while staying winless at 0–7–2. As with Detroit's earlier tie with the Yanks, the 49ers would regret having a win taken away later.
- In Week Ten (December 2), the 49ers beat the Lions 20–10, while the Rams triumphed over the Bears 42–17, giving L.A. the top spot in a tight National Division race. The New York Yanks finally won a game, 31–28 at Green Bay.
- In the penultimate regular games of the season in Week Eleven December 9, the Lions held the Rams to field goals five times, and the lone L.A. touchdown wasn't enough to keep Detroit from winning 24–22. Meanwhile, wins by the Bears and the 49ers made a four team National Division race, with Lions (7–3–1) in front of the Rams and Bears (both 7–4–0) and the 49ers (6–4–1) with one game left. But for the tying scores that had been made by the mediocre Yanks, the Lions and 49ers would have been 8–3 and 7–4.
- Detroit, which had lost at home to San Francisco a week before, would face them again on the coast on December 16 in Week Twelve. The Lions led by 3 points in San Francisco with one quarter left, but lost the game 21–17, along with the National Division title as both teams finished 7–4–1. The Bears were stunned by the Cardinals, 24–14, finishing 7–5–0. The Los Angeles Rams, who had been tied with the Green Bay 14–14 at halftime, poured on four touchdowns in the second half for a 42–14 win, an 8–4–0 record, and the right to host Cleveland in the 1951 NFL championship. At Yankee Stadium, only 6,658 spectators turned out to watch the last game ever for the New York Yanks, who lost to the crosstown Giants 27–17.

=== Division races ===
| Week | National | | American | |
|---|---|---|---|---|
| 1 | 4 teams (Bears, DET, LA, SF) | 1–0–0 | Philadelphia Eagles | 1–0–0 |
| 2 | Detroit Lions | 2–0–0 | Philadelphia Eagles | 2–0–0 |
| 3 | 5 teams (Bears, Det., GB, L.A., S.F.) | 2–1–0 | New York Giants | 2–0–1 |
| 4 | Tie (Bears, Rams) | 3–1–0 | New York Giants | 3–0–1 |
| 5 | Chicago Bears | 4–1–0 | Cleveland Browns | 4–1–0 |
| 6 | Chicago Bears | 5–1–0 | Cleveland Browns | 5–1–0 |
| 7 | Tie (Bears, Rams) | 5–2–0 | Cleveland Browns | 6–1–0 |
| 8 | Tie (Bears, Rams) | 6–2–0 | Cleveland Browns | 7–1–0 |
| 9 | Detroit Lions | 6–2–1 | Cleveland Browns | 8–1–0 |
| 10 | Los Angeles Rams | 7–3–0 | Cleveland Browns | 9–1–0 |
| 11 | Detroit Lions | 7–3–1 | Cleveland Browns | 10–1–0 |
| 12 | Los Angeles Rams | 8–4–0 | Cleveland Browns | 11–1–0 |

== Final standings ==
NFL American Conference
| | W | L | T | PCT | CONF | PF | PA | STK |
|---|---|---|---|---|---|---|---|---|
| Cleveland Browns | 11 | 1 | 0 | .917 | 9–0 | 331 | 152 | W11 |
| New York Giants | 9 | 2 | 1 | .818 | 7–2–1 | 254 | 161 | W4 |
| Washington Redskins | 5 | 7 | 0 | .417 | 4–5 | 183 | 296 | L1 |
| Pittsburgh Steelers | 4 | 7 | 1 | .364 | 3–5–1 | 183 | 235 | W1 |
| Philadelphia Eagles | 4 | 8 | 0 | .333 | 3–6 | 234 | 264 | L2 |
| Chicago Cardinals | 3 | 9 | 0 | .250 | 0–8 | 210 | 287 | W1 |

Note: Tie games were not officially counted in the standings until 1972.

NFL National Conference
| | W | L | T | PCT | CONF | PF | PA | STK |
|---|---|---|---|---|---|---|---|---|
| Los Angeles Rams | 8 | 4 | 0 | .667 | 7–2 | 392 | 261 | W1 |
| San Francisco 49ers | 7 | 4 | 1 | .636 | 5–2–1 | 255 | 205 | W3 |
| Detroit Lions | 7 | 4 | 1 | .636 | 5–4–1 | 336 | 259 | L1 |
| Chicago Bears | 7 | 5 | 0 | .583 | 6–2 | 286 | 282 | L1 |
| Green Bay Packers | 3 | 9 | 0 | .250 | 1–8 | 254 | 375 | L7 |
| New York Yanks | 1 | 9 | 2 | .100 | 1–7–2 | 241 | 382 | L2 |

== NFL Championship Game ==
Los Angeles 24, Cleveland 17 at Los Angeles Memorial Coliseum, Los Angeles, December 23, 1951

== League leaders ==
| Statistic | Name | Team | Yards |
|---|---|---|---|
| Passing | Bobby Layne | Detroit | 2403 |
| Rushing | Eddie Price | New York Giants | 971 |
| Receiving | Elroy Hirsch | Los Angeles | 1495 |

== Awards ==
- UPI NFL Most Valuable Player – Otto Graham, Cleveland Browns

== Coaching changes ==
=== Offseason ===
- Detroit Lions: Bo McMillin was replaced by Buddy Parker.
- New York Yanks: Red Strader was replaced by James Phelan.
- Philadelphia Eagles: Greasy Neale was replaced by Bo McMillin.

=== In-season ===
- Chicago Cardinals: Curly Lambeau resigned after 10 games. Phil Handler and Cecil Isbell served as co-head coaches for the final two games of the season.
- Philadelphia Eagles: Bo McMillin retired after two games after he was diagnosed with terminal stomach cancer. Wayne Millner served as interim for the rest of the season.
- Washington Redskins: Herman Ball was fired after three games. Dick Todd served as interim for the rest of the season.

== Deaths ==
=== January ===
- January 16- Pid Purdy, age 46, Running Back and Placekicker for the Green Bay Packers from 1926-1927.

=== June ===
- June 30- Don Murry, age 51, Guard and End for the Racine Legion and Chicago Bears from 1922-1932
