= 1951 New York Yanks season =

National Football League team season

- Head coach: Jimmy Phelan
- Home stadium: Yankee Stadium

Results
- Record: 1–9–2
- Division place: 6th NFL National
- Playoffs: Did not qualify

The 1951 New York Yanks season was their second as the Yanks (previously being the New York Bulldogs), and their final season in New York before the franchise was sold and moved to Dallas. The team failed to achieve their previous season's record of 7–5, winning just one game while tying two. They played eight of their twelve games on the road, including seven of the first eight. The sole victory came at Green Bay in early December. The final game against the neighboring Giants drew less than 6,700, played on an icy field with game time temperature of 17 °F (−8 °C).

The baseball Yankees had the rights to Yankee Stadium, so the football Yanks were forced to move their first two home games (weeks 1 and 2) onto the road, which were both night games. The World Series concluded in six games on October 10 and the first home football game came in week five on October 28.

After the season, the franchise was sold to a consortium from Dallas, where they became the Texans, using the blue and white color scheme and carrying on the franchise's legacy of the Dayton Triangles, the final remaining Ohio League member.

== Regular season ==
=== Schedule ===
| Week | Date | Opponent | Result | Record | Venue | Attendance | Recap |
|---|---|---|---|---|---|---|---|
| 1 | September 28 | **Los Angeles Rams** | **L** 14–54 | 0–1 | Los Angeles Memorial Coliseum | 30,315 | Recap |
| 2 | October 8 | **Detroit Lions** | **L** 10–37 | 0–2 | Briggs Stadium | 24,194 | Recap |
| 3 | October 14 | at **Chicago Bears** | **L** 21–24 | 0–3 | Wrigley Field | 37,697 | Recap |
| 4 | October 21 | at **Detroit Lions** | **T** 24–24 | 0–3–1 | Briggs Stadium | 21,807 | Recap |
| 5 | October 28 | **Green Bay Packers** | **L** 27–29 | 0–4–1 | Yankee Stadium | 7,351 | Recap |
| 6 | November 4 | at New York Giants | **L** 31–37 | 0–5–1 | Polo Grounds | 25,682 | Recap |
| 7 | November 11 | at **San Francisco 49ers** | **L** 14–19 | 0–6–1 | Kezar Stadium | 25,538 | Recap |
| 8 | November 18 | at **Los Angeles Rams** | **L** 21–48 | 0–7–1 | Los Angeles Memorial Coliseum | 34,717 | Recap |
| 9 | November 25 | **San Francisco 49ers** | **T** 10–10 | 0–7–2 | Yankee Stadium | 10,184 | Recap |
| 10 | December 2 | at **Green Bay Packers** | **W** 31–28 | 1–7–2 | City Stadium | 14,297 | Recap |
| 11 | December 9 | **Chicago Bears** | **L** 21–45 | 1–8–2 | Yankee Stadium | 13,075 | Recap |
| 12 | December 16 | New York Giants | **L** 17–27 | 1–9–2 | Yankee Stadium | 6,658 | Recap |
Note: Intra-conference opponents are in **bold** text.

=== Standings ===
NFL National Conference
| | W | L | T | PCT | CONF | PF | PA | STK |
|---|---|---|---|---|---|---|---|---|
| Los Angeles Rams | 8 | 4 | 0 | .667 | 7–2 | 392 | 261 | W1 |
| San Francisco 49ers | 7 | 4 | 1 | .636 | 5–2–1 | 255 | 205 | W3 |
| Detroit Lions | 7 | 4 | 1 | .636 | 5–4–1 | 336 | 259 | L1 |
| Chicago Bears | 7 | 5 | 0 | .583 | 6–2 | 286 | 282 | L1 |
| Green Bay Packers | 3 | 9 | 0 | .250 | 1–8 | 254 | 375 | L7 |
| New York Yanks | 1 | 9 | 2 | .100 | 1–7–2 | 241 | 382 | L2 |

Note: Tie games were not officially counted in the standings until 1972.

== Roster ==
New York Yanks 1950 roster
| Quarterbacks: 17 Bob Celeri; 25 George Ratterman; Running backs: 46 Sherman Howard; 20 George Taliaferro P/CB; 86 Zollie Toth; 76 Buddy Young; Receivers: 4 Dan Edwards; 7 Dan Garza; 66 Bill O'Connor | Offensive linemen: 44 Sisto Averno G; 21 Johnny Clowes G; 34 Joe Domnanovich C; 22 Brad Ecklund C; 71 Mike McCormack T; 47 Paul Mitchell T; 65 John Wozniak G; Defensive linemen: 12 Bruce Alford DE/WR; 35 Jim Champion MG; 36 Don Colo DT; 39 Art Donovan DT; 84 Barney Poole DE; 16 Breck Stroschein DE; 51 Art Tait DE | Linebackers: 15 Duke Iversen; 62 Harvey Johnson K; 45 Ross Nagel; Defensive backs: 31 Ben Aldridge CB; 3 Paul Crowe CB/RB; 10 Joe Golding S; 61 Bobbie Griffin CB/S; 33 Darrel Meisenheimer S; rookies in italics |
