= List of Green Bay Packers Associated Press All-Pro selections =

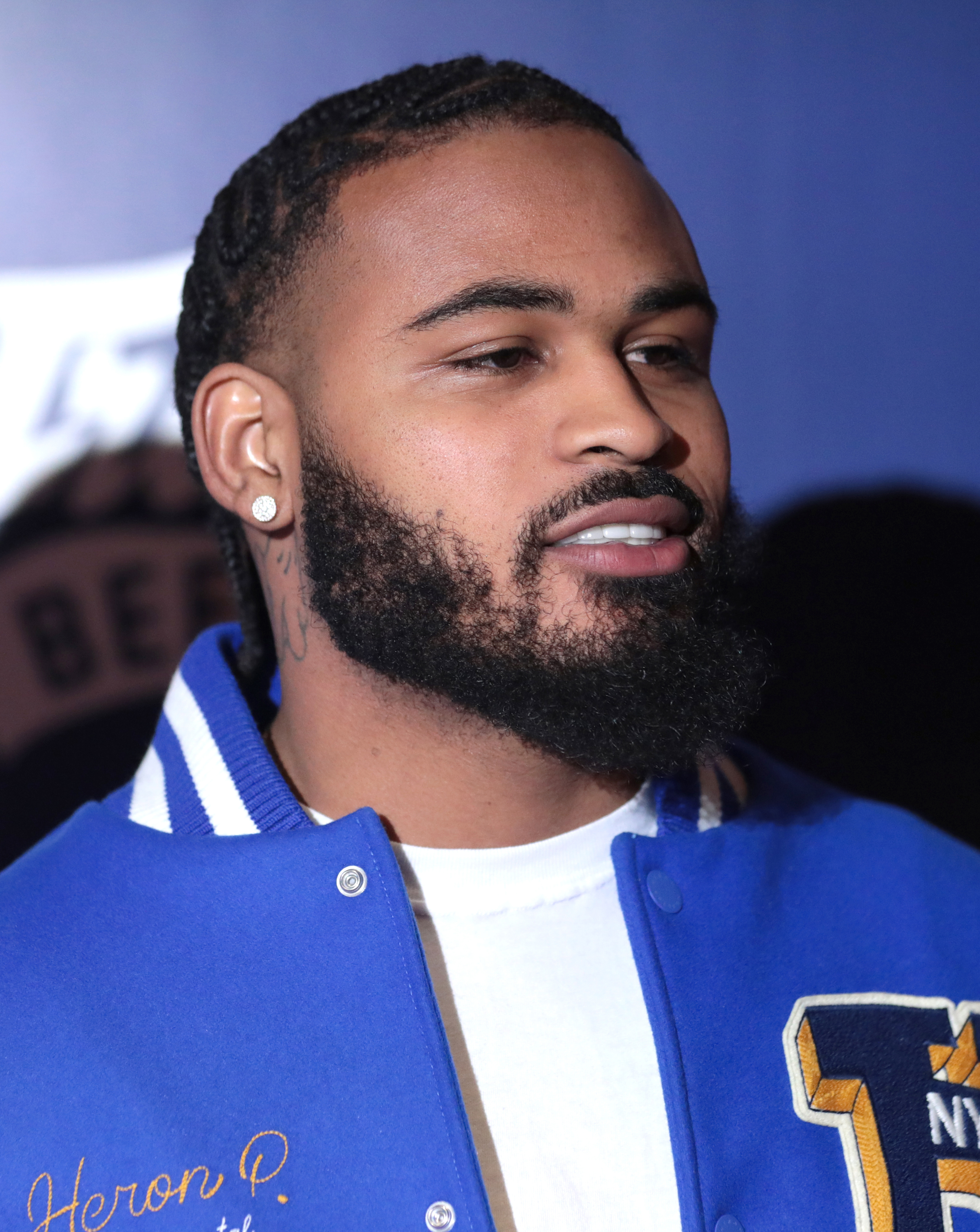
Keisean Nixon was chosen for back-to-back first-team selections in 2022 and 2023 as a kick returner.

The Green Bay Packers are a professional American football team based in Green Bay, Wisconsin. The Packers have competed in the National Football League (NFL) since 1921, two years after their original founding by Curly Lambeau and George Whitney Calhoun. They are members of the North Division of the National Football Conference (NFC) and play their home games at Lambeau Field in central Wisconsin.

Various news agencies selected All-Pro teams dating back to the first season of the NFL in 1921 (then known as the American Professional Football Association). These teams identified the best players at each position as determined by each group. Starting in 1931, the NFL compiled its own All-Pro team, although this ended in 1942. Notable All-Pro teams were compiled each season by the Associated Press (AP), the United Press International (UPI), Newspaper Enterprise Association (NEA), Sporting News, and the Pro Football Writers of America (PFWA), among other groups. The NEA All-Pro team ended in 1992 and the UPI All-Pro team was discontinued in 1997. Current All-Pro teams include AP, PFWA, and SN, as well as an All-Pro team developed by the NFL Players Association, which began in 2022. The most widely recognized All-Pro team is AP's, which is selected by a group of AP sportswriters. The All-Pro recognition is considered more prestigious than selection to a Pro Bowl, due to its exclusivity and its use of professional sportswriters for the selection process. The AP All-Pro Team includes a first team and second team, identifying the pre-eminent positional selections and their respective back-ups.

The Packers have had selections for AP All-Pro every year since 1940, except for sixteen seasons. The Packers' first AP All-Pro selection was future Pro Football Hall of Famer Don Hutson in 1940. The 1962 AP All-Pro Team included 14 Packers, the most that the team has ever had selected. Forrest Gregg, the Hall of Fame tackle, holds the Packers' team record for most AP All-Pro selections with eight total, while Gregg is tied with his Hall of Fame teammate Jim Ringo, a center, for the most AP All-Pro first-team selections with seven. The most recent AP All-Pro selections for the Packers were safety Xavier McKinney and defensive end Micah Parsons for the 2025 AP All-Pro Team.

== Selections ==
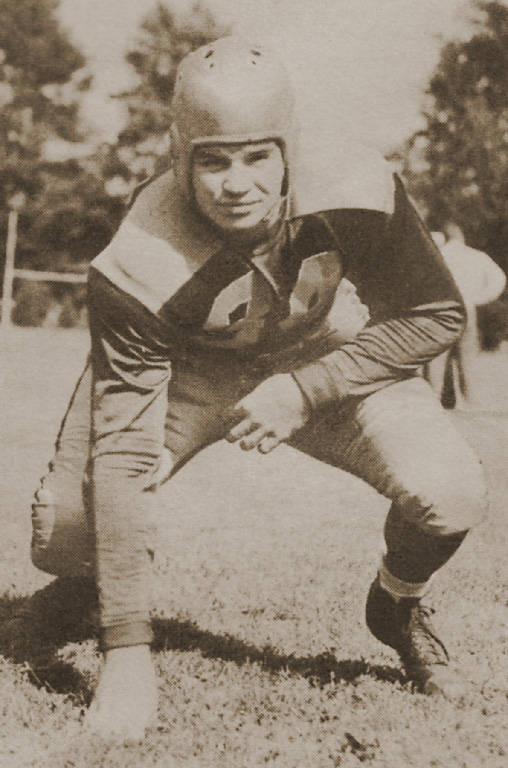
Chet Adams was selected for just one AP All-Pro team with the Packers in 1943.

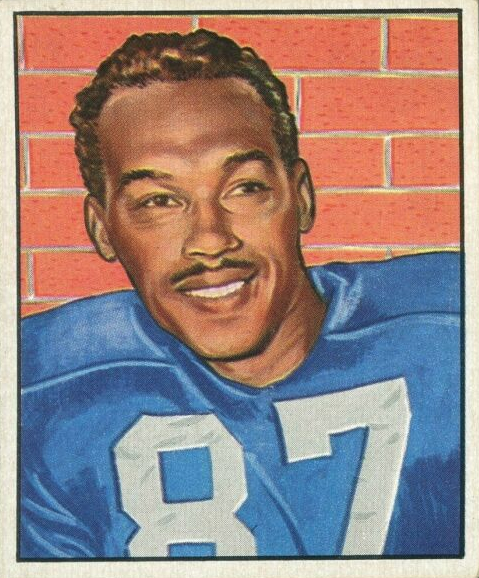
Bob Mann's only AP All-Pro selection with the Packers was in 1951.

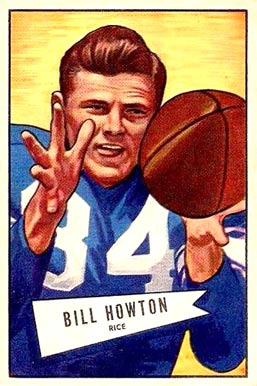
Billy Howton was a three-time AP All-Pro for the Packers.

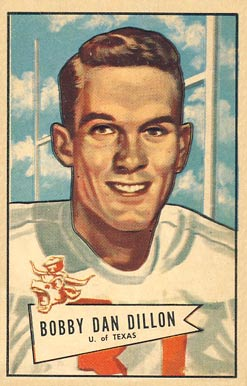
Bobby Dillon was a five-time AP All-Pro for the Packers.

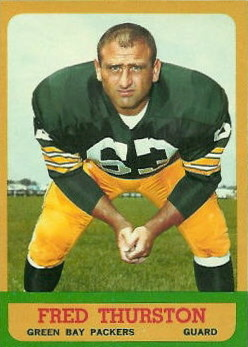
Fuzzy Thurston was selected to back-to-back AP All-Pro Teams in 1961 and 1962.

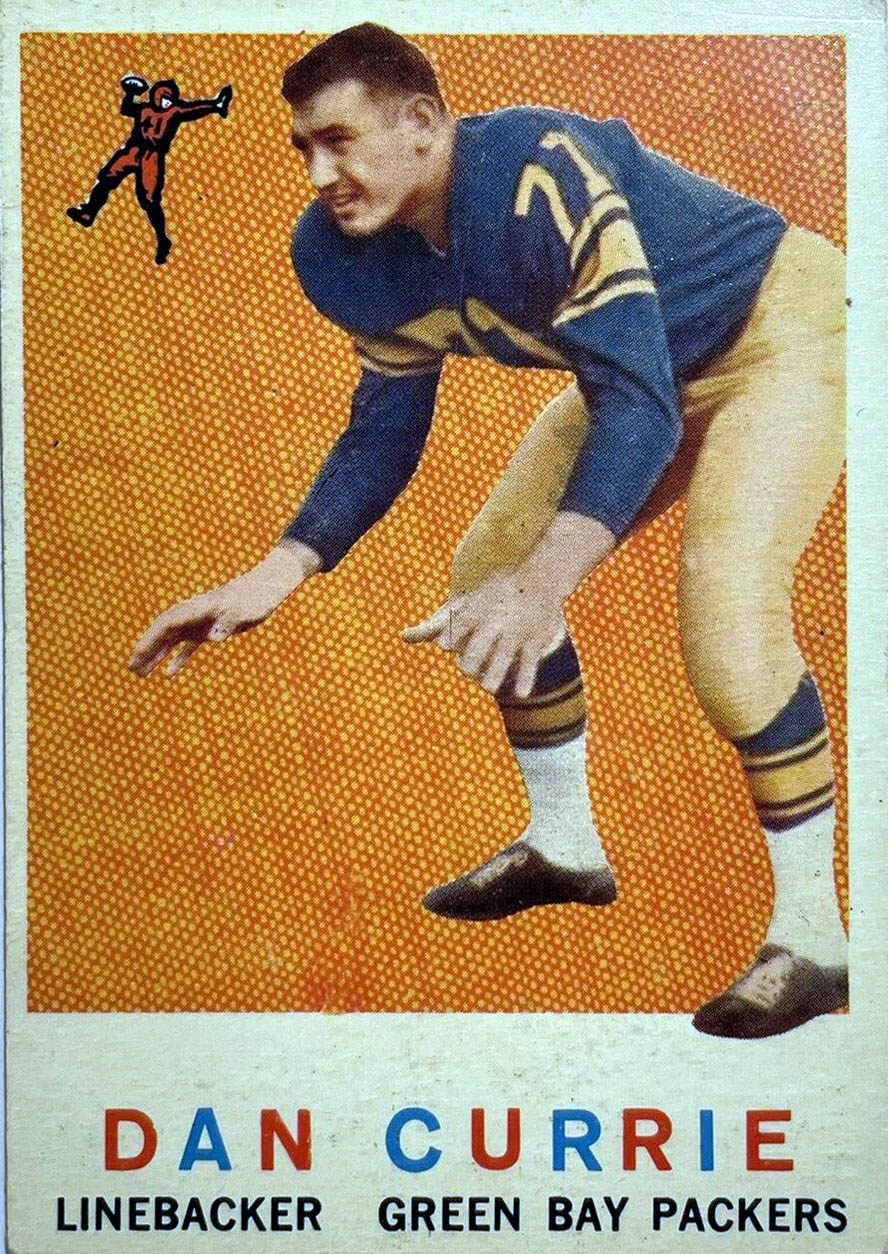
Dan Currie was selected to back-to-back AP All-Pro Teams in 1962 and 1963.

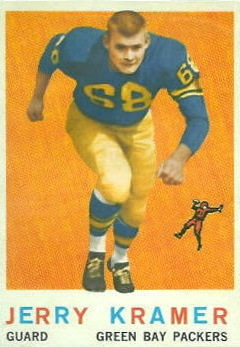
Jerry Kramer was selected to six AP All-Pro Teams while with the Packers, including five first-team selections.

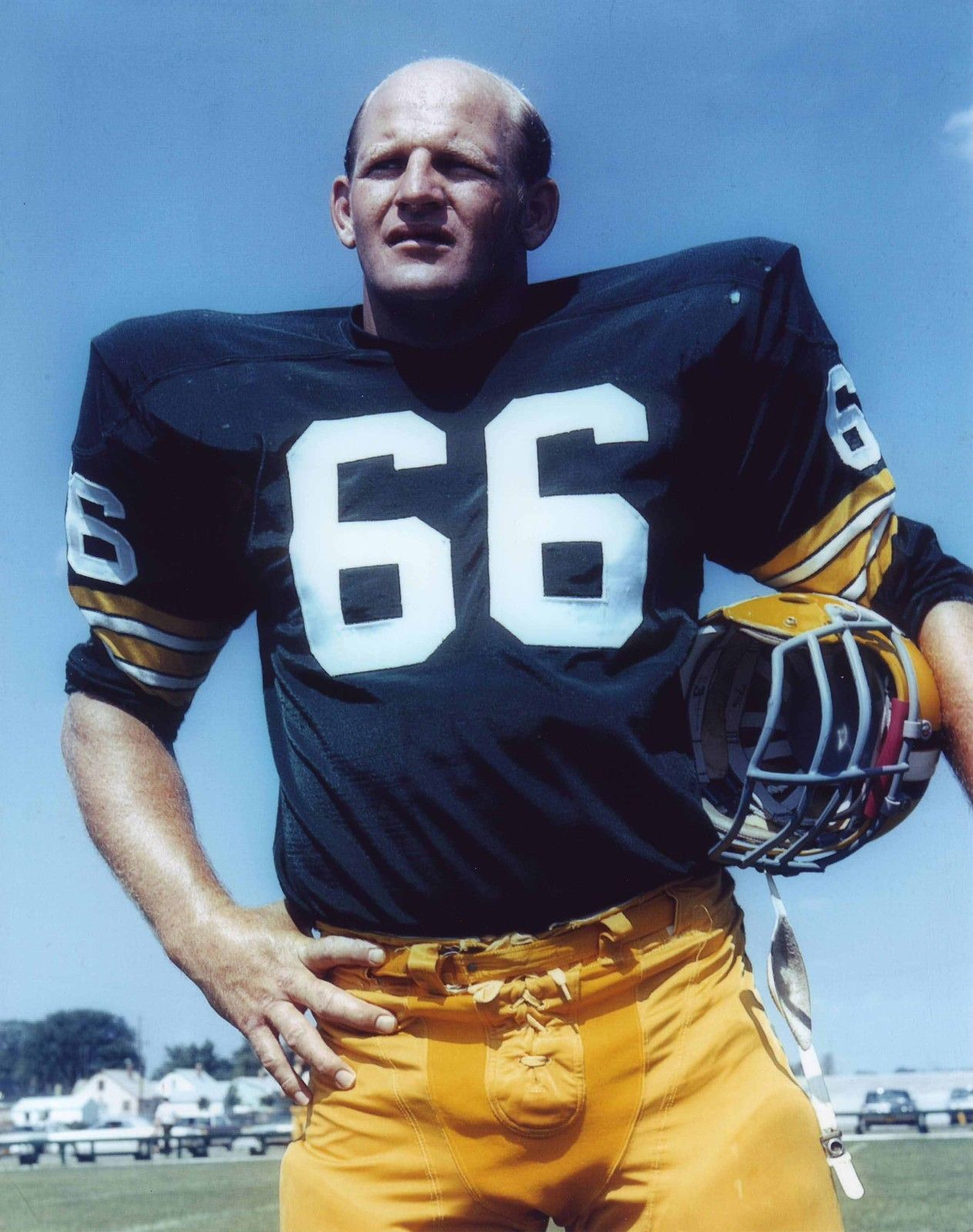
Ray Nitschke was selected to five AP All-Pro Teams, including four first-team selections.

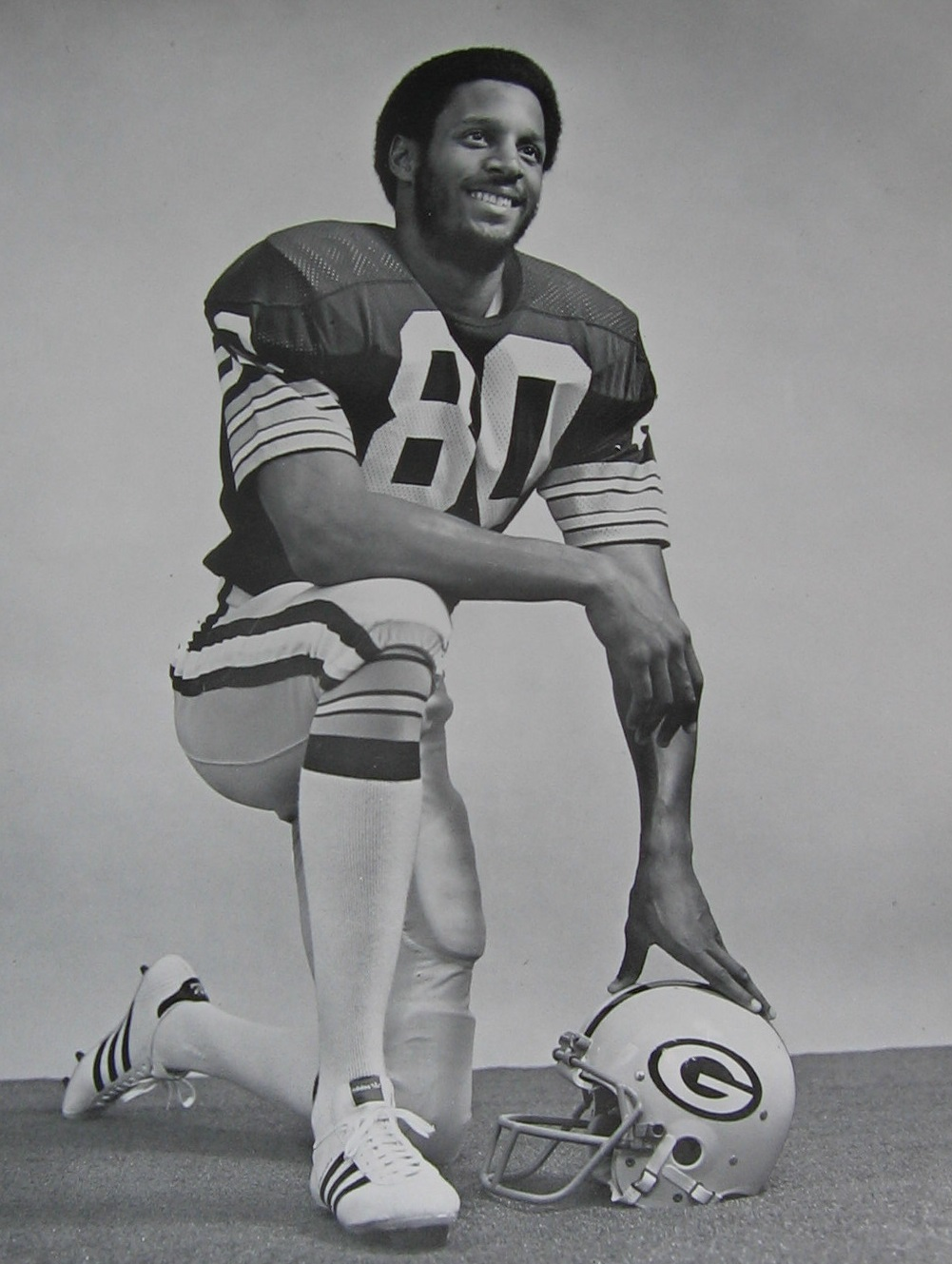
James Lofton was selected to four straight AP All-Pro Teams in the 1980s.

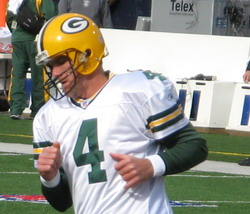
Brett Favre was selected to six total AP All-Pro Teams, tied with three other players for third-most in team history.

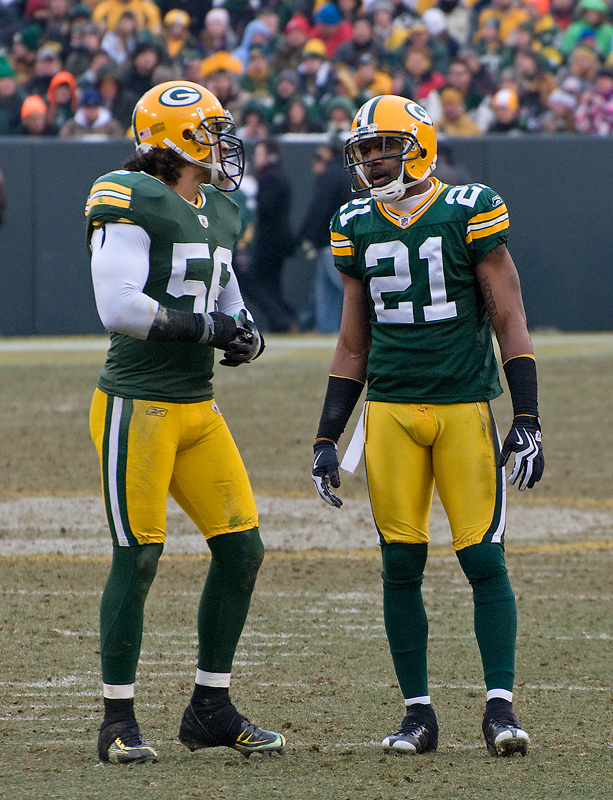
Nick Barnett (left) and Charles Woodson (right) were both selected to AP All-Pro teams while with the Packers. Barnett was selected once, while Woodson was selected three times.

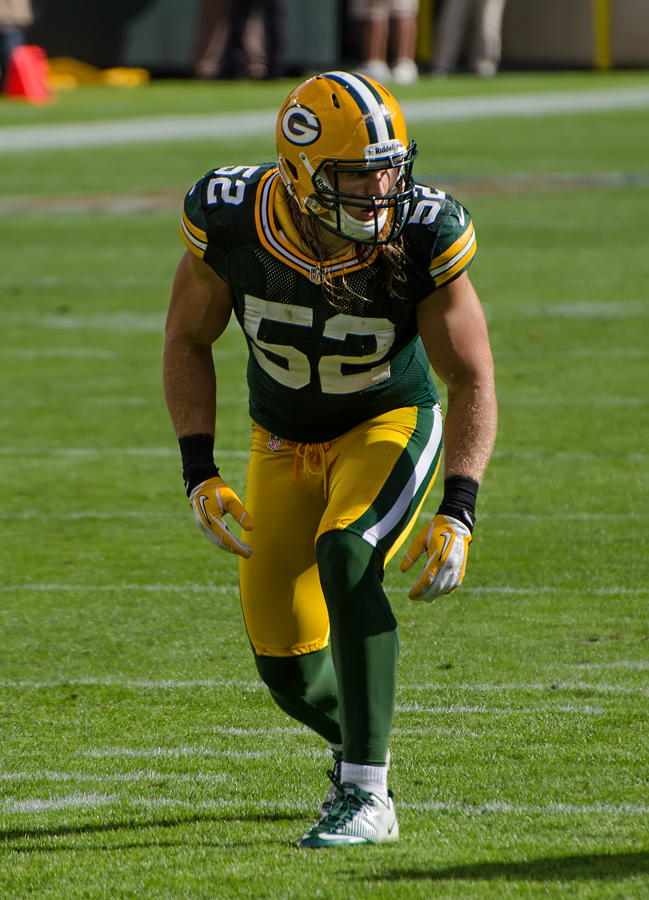
Clay Matthews III was a two-time AP All-Pro with the Packers.

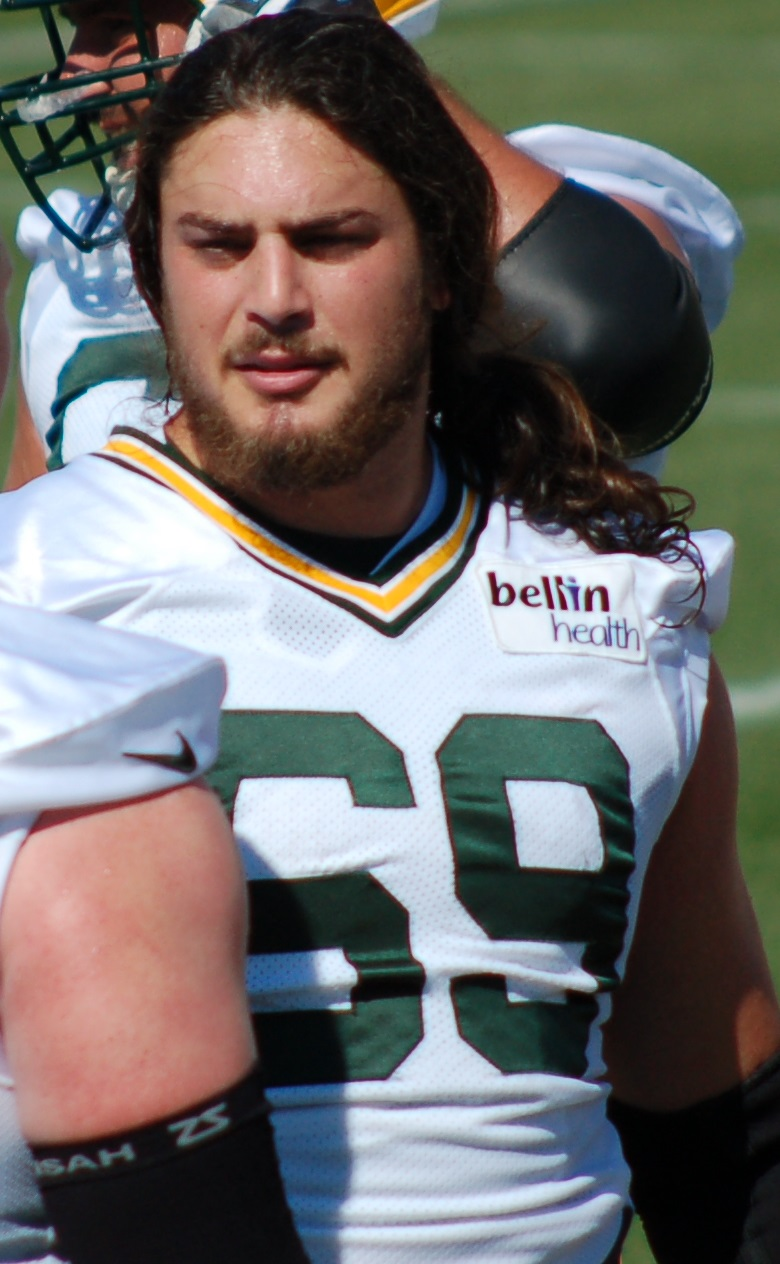
David Bakhtiari was selected to five straight AP All-Pro teams.

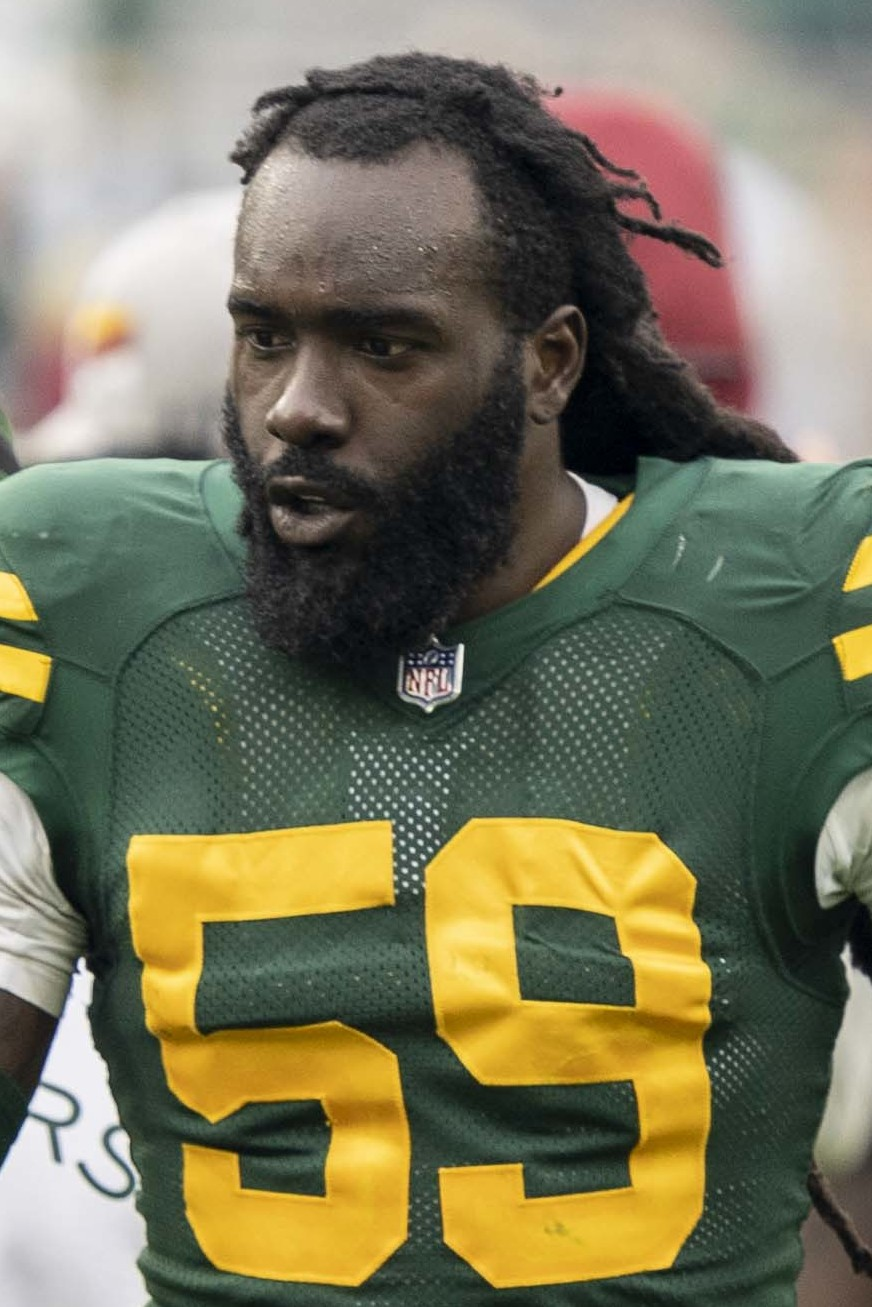
De'Vondre Campbell's first-team AP All-Pro selection in 2021 was his only one with the Packers.

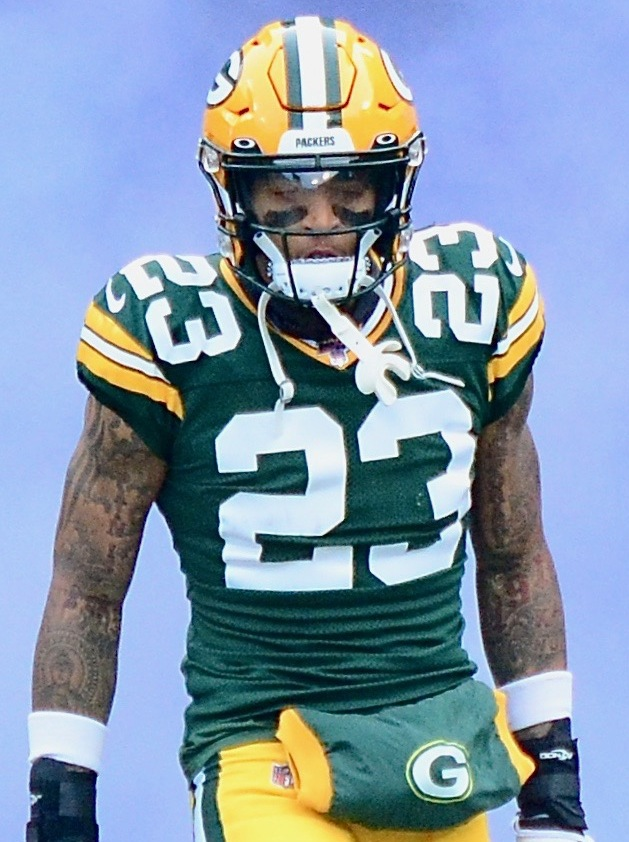
Jaire Alexander was selected to two AP All-Pro Teams, both as a second-team selection.

Key
| † | Selected as the NFL MVP for that season |

Green Bay Packers All-Pro selections by year
| Season | All-Pro Team | Number of Packers selected | | | Players (# of total All-Pros with Packers) | Position (Note: The position for which the player was selected as an All-Pro.) | Team | Refs |
| Season | All-Pro Team | Total | Team | | Players (# of total All-Pros with Packers) | Position | Team | Refs |
| Season | All-Pro Team | Total | First | Second | Players (# of total All-Pros with Packers) | Position | Team | Refs |
|---|---|---|---|---|---|---|---|---|
| 1940 | 1940 | 1 | 1 | 0 | Don Hutson (1) | End | First | |
| 1941 | 1941 | 4 | 2 | 2 | Clarke Hinkle (1) | Fullback | Second | |
| 1941 | 1941 | 4 | 2 | 2 | Don Hutson (2) † | End | First | |
| 1941 | 1941 | 4 | 2 | 2 | Cecil Isbell (1) | Tailback | First | |
| 1941 | 1941 | 4 | 2 | 2 | Pete Tinsley (1) | Right guard | Second | |
| 1942 | 1942 | 3 | 1 | 2 | Charles Goldenberg (1) | Right guard | Second | |
| 1942 | 1942 | 3 | 1 | 2 | Don Hutson (3) † | End | First | |
| 1942 | 1942 | 3 | 1 | 2 | Cecil Isbell (2) | Tailback | Second | |
| 1943 | 1943 | 4 | 2 | 2 | Chet Adams (1) | Tackle | Second | |
| 1943 | 1943 | 4 | 2 | 2 | Charley Brock (1) | Center | Second | |
| 1943 | 1943 | 4 | 2 | 2 | Tony Canadeo (1) | Tailback | First | |
| 1943 | 1943 | 4 | 2 | 2 | Don Hutson (4) | End | First | |
| 1944 | 1944 | 1 | 1 | 0 | Don Hutson (5) | End | First | |
| 1945 | 1945 | 2 | 2 | 0 | Charley Brock (2) | Center | First | |
| 1945 | 1945 | 2 | 2 | 0 | Don Hutson (6) | End | First | |
| 1946 | 1946 | 1 | 1 | 0 | Ted Fritsch (1) | Fullback | First | |
| 1947 | 1947 | 0 | 0 | 0 | None | N/A | N/A | |
| 1948 | 1948 | 0 | 0 | 0 | None | N/A | N/A | |
| 1949 | 1949 | 1 | 0 | 1 | Tony Canadeo (2) | Left halfback | Second | |
| 1950 | 1950 | 1 | 0 | 1 | Clayton Tonnemaker (1) | Middle linebacker | Second | |
| 1951 | 1951 | 1 | 0 | 1 | Bob Mann (1) | Left end | Second | |
| 1952 | 1952 | 0 | 0 | 0 | Billy Howton (1) | Right end | Second | |
| 1953 | 1953 | 0 | 0 | 0 | None | N/A | N/A | |
| 1954 | 1954 | 3 | 1 | 2 | Bobby Dillon (1) | Safety | First | |
| 1954 | 1954 | 3 | 1 | 2 | Clayton Tonnemaker (2) | Middle linebacker | Second | |
| 1954 | 1954 | 3 | 1 | 2 | Roger Zatkoff (1) | Right linebacker | Second | |
| 1955 | 1955 | 4 | 2 | 2 | Bobby Dillon (2) | Safety | First | |
| 1955 | 1955 | 4 | 2 | 2 | Howie Ferguson (1) | Fullback | Second | |
| 1955 | 1955 | 4 | 2 | 2 | Tobin Rote (1) | Quarterback | Second | |
| 1955 | 1955 | 4 | 2 | 2 | Roger Zatkoff (2) | Right linebacker | First | |
| 1956 | 1956 | 3 | 1 | 2 | Bobby Dillon (3) | Safety | Second | |
| 1956 | 1956 | 3 | 1 | 2 | Billy Howton (2) | Right end | First | |
| 1956 | 1956 | 3 | 1 | 2 | Tobin Rote (2) | Quarterback | Second | |
| 1957 | 1957 | 3 | 3 | 0 | Bobby Dillon (4) | Safety | First | |
| 1957 | 1957 | 3 | 3 | 0 | Billy Howton (3) | Right end | First | |
| 1957 | 1957 | 3 | 3 | 0 | Jim Ringo (1) | Center | First | |
| 1958 | 1958 | 2 | 2 | 0 | Bobby Dillon (5) | Safety | First | |
| 1958 | 1958 | 2 | 2 | 0 | Jim Ringo (2) | Center | First | |
| 1959 | 1959 | 3 | 1 | 2 | Paul Hornung (1) | Left halfback | Second | |
| 1959 | 1959 | 3 | 1 | 2 | Forrest Gregg (1) | Right tackle | Second | |
| 1959 | 1959 | 3 | 1 | 2 | Jim Ringo (3) | Center | First | |
| 1960 | 1960 | 8 | 6 | 2 | Bill Forester (1) | Right linebacker | First | |
| 1960 | 1960 | 8 | 6 | 2 | Forrest Gregg (2) | Right tackle | First | |
| 1960 | 1960 | 8 | 6 | 2 | Paul Hornung (2) | Left halfback | First | |
| 1960 | 1960 | 8 | 6 | 2 | Henry Jordan (1) | Defensive tackle | First | |
| 1960 | 1960 | 8 | 6 | 2 | Jerry Kramer (1) | Right guard | First | |
| 1960 | 1960 | 8 | 6 | 2 | Jim Ringo (4) | Center | First | |
| 1960 | 1960 | 8 | 6 | 2 | Jim Taylor (1) | Fullback | Second | |
| 1960 | 1960 | 8 | 6 | 2 | Jesse Whittenton (1) | Cornerback | Second | |
| 1961 | 1961 | 6 | 5 | 1 | Bill Forester (2) | Right linebacker | First | |
| 1961 | 1961 | 6 | 5 | 1 | Paul Hornung (3) † | Left halfback | First | |
| 1961 | 1961 | 6 | 5 | 1 | Henry Jordan (2) | Defensive tackle | First | |
| 1961 | 1961 | 6 | 5 | 1 | Jim Ringo (5) | Center | First | |
| 1961 | 1961 | 6 | 5 | 1 | Fuzzy Thurston (1) | Right guard | First | |
| 1961 | 1961 | 6 | 5 | 1 | Jesse Whittenton (2) | Cornerback | Second | |
| 1962 | 1962 | 14 | 10 | 4 | Herb Adderley (1) | Left cornerback | First | |
| 1962 | 1962 | 14 | 10 | 4 | Dan Currie (1) | Left linebacker | First | |
| 1962 | 1962 | 14 | 10 | 4 | Willie Davis (1) | Left defensive end | First | |
| 1962 | 1962 | 14 | 10 | 4 | Bill Forester (3) | Right linebacker | First | |
| 1962 | 1962 | 14 | 10 | 4 | Forrest Gregg (3) | Right tackle | First | |
| 1962 | 1962 | 14 | 10 | 4 | Henry Jordan (3) | Defensive tackle | First | |
| 1962 | 1962 | 14 | 10 | 4 | Jerry Kramer (2) | Right guard | First | |
| 1962 | 1962 | 14 | 10 | 4 | Ron Kramer (1) | Tight end | First | |
| 1962 | 1962 | 14 | 10 | 4 | Ray Nitschke (1) | Middle linebacker | Second | |
| 1962 | 1962 | 14 | 10 | 4 | Jim Ringo (6) | Center | First | |
| 1962 | 1962 | 14 | 10 | 4 | Bart Starr (1) | Quarterback | Second | |
| 1962 | 1962 | 14 | 10 | 4 | Jim Taylor (2) † | Fullback | First | |
| 1962 | 1962 | 14 | 10 | 4 | Fuzzy Thurston (2) | Right guard | Second | |
| 1962 | 1962 | 14 | 10 | 4 | Willie Wood (1) | Free safety | Second | |
| 1963 | 1963 | 9 | 5 | 4 | Herb Adderley (2) | Left cornerback | First | |
| 1963 | 1963 | 9 | 5 | 4 | Dan Currie (2) | Left linebacker | Second | |
| 1963 | 1963 | 9 | 5 | 4 | Forrest Gregg (4) | Right tackle | First | |
| 1963 | 1963 | 9 | 5 | 4 | Henry Jordan (4) | Right defensive tackle | First | |
| 1963 | 1963 | 9 | 5 | 4 | Jerry Kramer (3) | Right guard | First | |
| 1963 | 1963 | 9 | 5 | 4 | Ron Kramer (2) | Tight end | Second | |
| 1963 | 1963 | 9 | 5 | 4 | Tom Moore (1) | Halfback | Second | |
| 1963 | 1963 | 9 | 5 | 4 | Jim Ringo (7) | Center | First | |
| 1963 | 1963 | 9 | 5 | 4 | Jim Taylor (3) | Fullback | Second | |
| 1964 | 1964 | 7 | 5 | 2 | Herb Adderley (3) | Left cornerback | Second | |
| 1964 | 1964 | 7 | 5 | 2 | Willie Davis (2) | Left defensive end | First | |
| 1964 | 1964 | 7 | 5 | 2 | Forrest Gregg (5) | Right tackle | First | |
| 1964 | 1964 | 7 | 5 | 2 | Henry Jordan (5) | Right defensive tackle | First | |
| 1964 | 1964 | 7 | 5 | 2 | Ray Nitschke (2) | Middle linebacker | First | |
| 1964 | 1964 | 7 | 5 | 2 | Bart Starr (2) | Quarterback | Second | |
| 1964 | 1964 | 7 | 5 | 2 | Willie Wood (2) | Free safety | First | |
| 1965 | 1965 | 5 | 4 | 1 | Herb Adderley (4) | Left cornerback | Second | |
| 1965 | 1965 | 5 | 4 | 1 | Willie Davis (3) | Left defensive end | First | |
| 1965 | 1965 | 5 | 4 | 1 | Forrest Gregg (6) | Left guard | First | |
| 1965 | 1965 | 5 | 4 | 1 | Ray Nitschke (3) | Middle linebacker | First | |
| 1965 | 1965 | 5 | 4 | 1 | Willie Wood (3) | Free safety | First | |
| 1966 | 1966 | 9 | 8 | 1 | Herb Adderley (5) | Left cornerback | Second | |
| 1966 | 1966 | 9 | 8 | 1 | Lee Roy Caffey (1) | Right linebacker | First | |
| 1966 | 1966 | 9 | 8 | 1 | Willie Davis (4) | Left defensive end | First | |
| 1966 | 1966 | 9 | 8 | 1 | Forrest Gregg (7) | Right tackle | First | |
| 1966 | 1966 | 9 | 8 | 1 | Henry Jordan (6) | Right defensive tackle | First | |
| 1966 | 1966 | 9 | 8 | 1 | Jerry Kramer (4) | Right guard | First | |
| 1966 | 1966 | 9 | 8 | 1 | Ray Nitschke (4) | Middle linebacker | First | |
| 1966 | 1966 | 9 | 8 | 1 | Bart Starr (3) † | Quarterback | First | |
| 1966 | 1966 | 9 | 8 | 1 | Willie Wood (4) | Strong safety | First | |
| 1967 | 1967 | 8 | 7 | 1 | Herb Adderley (6) | Left cornerback | Second | |
| 1967 | 1967 | 8 | 7 | 1 | Willie Davis (5) | Left defensive end | First | |
| 1967 | 1967 | 8 | 7 | 1 | Forrest Gregg (8) | Right tackle | First | |
| 1967 | 1967 | 8 | 7 | 1 | Bob Jeter (1) | Right cornerback | First | |
| 1967 | 1967 | 8 | 7 | 1 | Jerry Kramer (5) | Right guard | First | |
| 1967 | 1967 | 8 | 7 | 1 | Ray Nitschke (5) | Middle linebacker | First | |
| 1967 | 1967 | 8 | 7 | 1 | Dave Robinson (1) | Outside linebacker | First | |
| 1967 | 1967 | 8 | 7 | 1 | Willie Wood (5) | Strong safety | First | |
| 1968 | 1968 | 3 | 1 | 2 | Jerry Kramer (6) | Right guard | Second | |
| 1968 | 1968 | 3 | 1 | 2 | Dave Robinson (2) | Outside linebacker | First | |
| 1968 | 1968 | 3 | 1 | 2 | Willie Wood (6) | Free safety | Second | |
| 1969 | 1969 | 2 | 2 | 0 | Herb Adderley (7) | Cornerback | First | |
| 1969 | 1969 | 2 | 2 | 0 | Dave Robinson (3) | Outside linebacker | First | |
| 1970 | 1970 | 1 | 1 | 0 | Gale Gillingham (1) | Right guard | First | |
| 1971 | 1971 | 1 | 1 | 0 | John Brockington (1) | Fullback | First | |
| 1972 | 1972 | 2 | 2 | 0 | Ken Ellis (1) | Right cornerback | First | |
| 1972 | 1972 | 2 | 2 | 0 | Chester Marcol (1) | Placekicker | First | |
| 1973 | 1973 | 0 | 0 | 0 | None | N/A | N/A | |
| 1974 | 1974 | 2 | 2 | 0 | Ted Hendricks (1) | Left linebacker | First | |
| 1974 | 1974 | 2 | 2 | 0 | Chester Marcol (2) | Placekicker | First | |
| 1975 | 1975 | 0 | 0 | 0 | None | N/A | N/A | |
| 1976 | 1976 | 0 | 0 | 0 | None | N/A | N/A | |
| 1977 | 1977 | 0 | 0 | 0 | None | N/A | N/A | |
| 1978 | 1978 | 1 | 1 | 0 | Willie Buchanon (1) | Left cornerback | First | |
| 1979 | 1979 | 0 | 0 | 0 | None | N/A | N/A | |
| 1980 | 1980 | 1 | 0 | 1 | James Lofton (1) | Wide receiver | Second | |
| 1981 | 1981 | 1 | 1 | 0 | James Lofton (2) | Wide receiver | First | |
| 1982 | 1982 | 1 | 0 | 1 | James Lofton (3) | Wide receiver | Second | |
| 1983 | 1983 | 1 | 0 | 1 | James Lofton (4) | Wide receiver | Second | |
| 1984 | 1984 | 0 | 0 | 0 | None | N/A | N/A | |
| 1985 | 1985 | 0 | 0 | 0 | None | N/A | N/A | |
| 1986 | 1986 | 0 | 0 | 0 | None | N/A | N/A | |
| 1987 | 1987 | 0 | 0 | 0 | None | N/A | N/A | |
| 1988 | 1988 | 1 | 0 | 1 | Tim Harris (1) | Right outside linebacker | Second | |
| 1989 | 1989 | 3 | 2 | 1 | Don Majkowski (1) | Quarterback | Second | |
| 1989 | 1989 | 3 | 2 | 1 | Tim Harris (2) | Right outside linebacker | First | |
| 1989 | 1989 | 3 | 2 | 1 | Sterling Sharpe (1) | Wide receiver | First | |
| 1990 | 1990 | 0 | 0 | 0 | None | N/A | N/A | |
| 1991 | 1991 | 0 | 0 | 0 | None | N/A | N/A | |
| 1992 | 1992 | 1 | 1 | 0 | Sterling Sharpe (2) | Wide receiver | First | |
| 1993 | 1993 | 3 | 3 | 0 | LeRoy Butler (1) | Strong safety | First | |
| 1993 | 1993 | 3 | 3 | 0 | Chris Jacke (1) | Placekicker | First | |
| 1993 | 1993 | 3 | 3 | 0 | Sterling Sharpe (3) | Wide receiver | First | |
| 1994 | 1994 | 1 | 0 | 1 | Reggie White (1) | Left defensive end | Second | |
| 1995 | 1995 | 2 | 2 | 0 | Brett Favre (1) † | Quarterback | First | |
| 1995 | 1995 | 2 | 2 | 0 | Reggie White (2) | Left defensive end | First | |
| 1996 | 1996 | 3 | 2 | 1 | LeRoy Butler (2) | Strong safety | First | |
| 1996 | 1996 | 3 | 2 | 1 | Brett Favre (2) † | Quarterback | First | |
| 1996 | 1996 | 3 | 2 | 1 | Reggie White (3) | Left defensive end | Second | |
| 1997 | 1997 | 2 | 2 | 0 | LeRoy Butler (3) | Strong safety | First | |
| 1997 | 1997 | 2 | 2 | 0 | Brett Favre (3) † | Quarterback | First | |
| 1998 | 1998 | 4 | 3 | 1 | LeRoy Butler (4) | Strong safety | First | |
| 1998 | 1998 | 4 | 3 | 1 | Antonio Freeman (1) | Wide receiver | First | |
| 1998 | 1998 | 4 | 3 | 1 | Roell Preston (1) | Wide receiver | Second | |
| 1998 | 1998 | 4 | 3 | 1 | Reggie White (4) | Left defensive end | First | |
| 1999 | 1999 | 0 | 0 | 0 | None | N/A | N/A | |
| 2000 | 2000 | 1 | 1 | 0 | Darren Sharper (1) | Free safety | First | |
| 2001 | 2001 | 2 | 0 | 2 | Brett Favre (4) | Quarterback | Second | |
| 2001 | 2001 | 2 | 0 | 2 | Ahman Green (1) | Running back | Second | |
| 2002 | 2002 | 2 | 0 | 2 | Brett Favre (5) | Quarterback | Second | |
| 2002 | 2002 | 2 | 0 | 2 | Darren Sharper (2) | Free safety | Second | |
| 2003 | 2003 | 1 | 0 | 1 | Marco Rivera (1) | Right guard | Second | |
| 2004 | 2004 | 1 | 1 | 0 | William Henderson (1) | Fullback | First | |
| 2005 | 2005 | 0 | 0 | 0 | None | N/A | N/A | |
| 2006 | 2006 | 1 | 0 | 1 | Aaron Kampman (1) | Defensive end | Second | |
| 2007 | 2007 | 4 | 0 | 4 | Nick Barnett (1) | Inside linebacker | Second | |
| 2007 | 2007 | 4 | 0 | 4 | Brett Favre (6) | Quarterback | Second | |
| 2007 | 2007 | 4 | 0 | 4 | Al Harris (1) | Defensive end | Second | |
| 2007 | 2007 | 4 | 0 | 4 | Aaron Kampman (2) | Defensive end | Second | |
| 2008 | 2008 | 2 | 0 | 2 | Nick Collins (1) | Safety | Second | |
| 2008 | 2008 | 2 | 0 | 2 | Charles Woodson (1) | Cornerback | Second | |
| 2009 | 2009 | 2 | 1 | 1 | Nick Collins (2) | Safety | Second | |
| 2009 | 2009 | 2 | 1 | 1 | Charles Woodson (2) | Cornerback | First | |
| 2010 | 2010 | 3 | 1 | 2 | Nick Collins (3) | Safety | Second | |
| 2010 | 2010 | 3 | 1 | 2 | Clay Matthews III (1) | Outside linebacker | First | |
| 2010 | 2010 | 3 | 1 | 2 | Charles Woodson (3) | Cornerback | Second | |
| 2011 | 2011 | 2 | 1 | 1 | John Kuhn (1) | Fullback | Second | |
| 2011 | 2011 | 2 | 1 | 1 | Aaron Rodgers (1) † | Quarterback | First | |
| 2012 | 2012 | 2 | 0 | 2 | Clay Matthews III (2) | Outside linebacker | Second | |
| 2012 | 2012 | 2 | 0 | 2 | Aaron Rodgers (2) | Quarterback | Second | |
| 2013 | 2013 | 2 | 0 | 2 | Eddie Lacy (1) | Running back | Second | |
| 2013 | 2013 | 2 | 0 | 2 | Josh Sitton (1) | Guard | Second | |
| 2014 | 2014 | 4 | 2 | 2 | John Kuhn (2) | Fullback | First | |
| 2014 | 2014 | 4 | 2 | 2 | Jordy Nelson (1) | Wide receiver | Second | |
| 2014 | 2014 | 4 | 2 | 2 | Aaron Rodgers (3) † | Quarterback | First | |
| 2014 | 2014 | 4 | 2 | 2 | Josh Sitton (2) | Guard | Second | |
| 2015 | 2015 | 1 | 0 | 1 | Josh Sitton (3) | Guard | Second | |
| 2016 | 2016 | 2 | 0 | 2 | David Bakhtiari (1) | Tackle | Second | |
| 2016 | 2016 | 2 | 0 | 2 | Ha Ha Clinton-Dix (1) | Safety | Second | |
| 2017 | 2017 | 1 | 0 | 1 | David Bakhtiari (2) | Tackle | Second | |
| 2018 | 2018 | 1 | 1 | 0 | David Bakhtiari (3) | Tackle | First | |
| 2019 | 2019 | 1 | 0 | 1 | David Bakhtiari (4) | Tackle | Second | |
| 2020 | 2020 | 6 | 5 | 1 | Davante Adams (1) | Wide receiver | First | |
| 2020 | 2020 | 6 | 5 | 1 | Jaire Alexander (1) | Cornerback | Second | |
| 2020 | 2020 | 6 | 5 | 1 | David Bakhtiari (5) | Tackle | First | |
| 2020 | 2020 | 6 | 5 | 1 | Corey Linsley (1) | Center | First | |
| 2020 | 2020 | 6 | 5 | 1 | Aaron Rodgers (4) † | Quarterback | First | |
| 2020 | 2020 | 6 | 5 | 1 | Za'Darius Smith (1) | Outside linebacker | First | |
| 2021 | 2021 | 3 | 3 | 0 | Davante Adams (2) | Wide receiver | First | |
| 2021 | 2021 | 3 | 3 | 0 | De'Vondre Campbell (1) | Inside linebacker | First | |
| 2021 | 2021 | 3 | 3 | 0 | Aaron Rodgers (5) † | Quarterback | First | |
| 2022 | 2022 | 2 | 1 | 1 | Jaire Alexander (2) | Cornerback | Second | |
| 2022 | 2022 | 2 | 1 | 1 | Keisean Nixon (1) | Kick returner | First | |
| 2023 | 2023 | 1 | 1 | 0 | Keisean Nixon (2) | Kick returner | First | |
| 2024 | 2024 | 1 | 1 | 0 | Xavier McKinney (1) | Safety | First | |
| 2025 | 2025 | 2 | 1 | 1 | Xavier McKinney (2) | Safety | Second | |
| 2025 | 2025 | 2 | 1 | 1 | Micah Parsons (1) | Defensive end | First | |

== Most selections ==
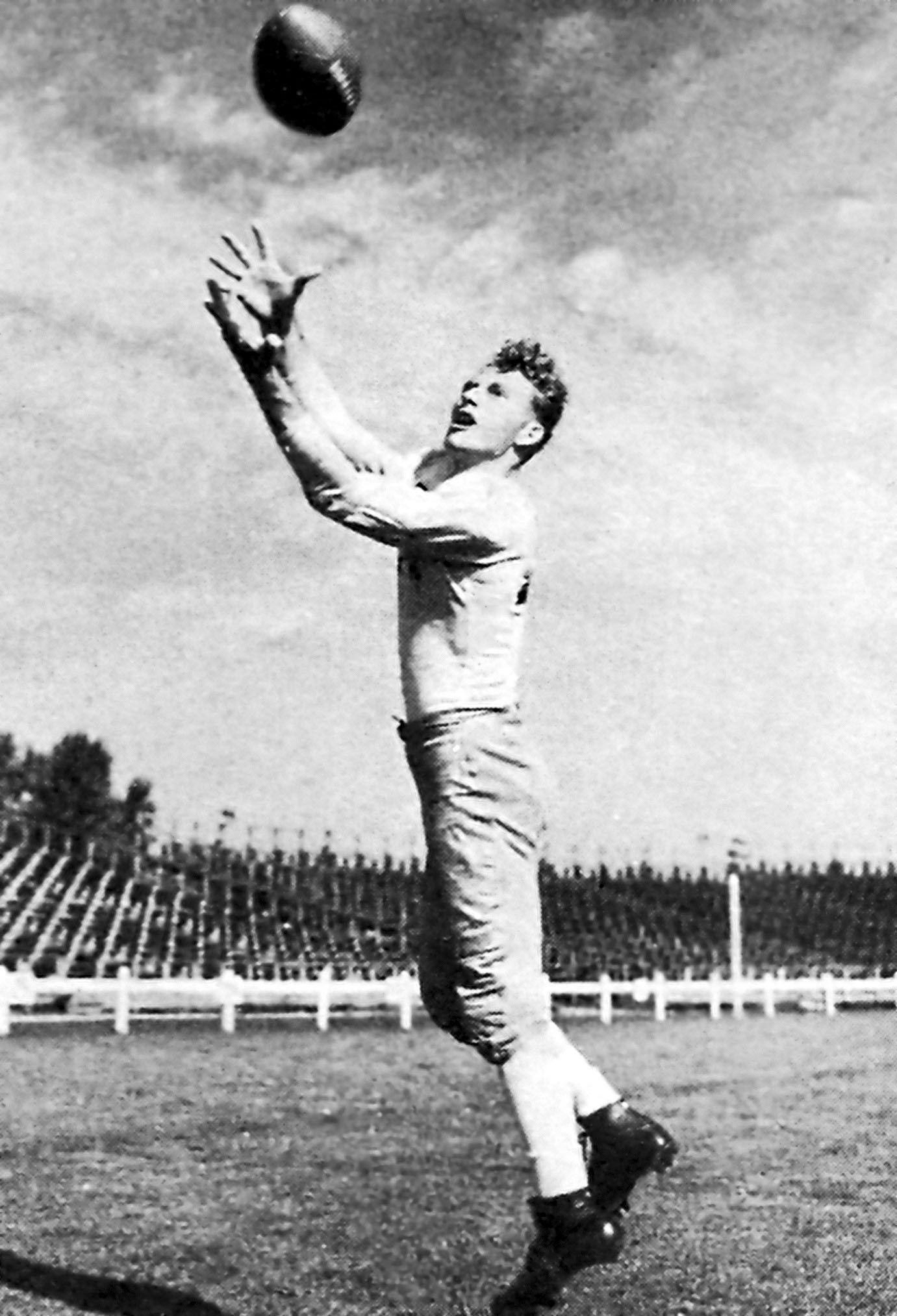
Don Hutson's six AP All-Pro selections were all on the first team.

Green Bay Packers players with the most All-Pro selections while part of the team
| Player | Position (Note: The position which the player is most known for.) | All-Pros | | | Refs |
| Player | Position | Total | Team | | Refs |
| Player | Position | Total | First | Second | Refs |
|---|---|---|---|---|---|
| Forrest Gregg | Tackle | 8 | 7 | 1 | |
| Herb Adderley | Cornerback | 7 | 3 | 4 | |
| Jim Ringo | Center | 7 | 7 | 0 | |
| Brett Favre | Quarterback | 6 | 3 | 3 | |
| Don Hutson | End | 6 | 6 | 0 | |
| Henry Jordan | Defensive tackle | 6 | 6 | 0 | |
| Jerry Kramer | Guard | 6 | 5 | 1 | |
| Willie Wood | Safety | 6 | 4 | 2 | |
| David Bakhtiari | Tackle | 5 | 2 | 3 | |
| Willie Davis | Defensive end | 5 | 5 | 0 | |
| Bobby Dillon | Safety | 5 | 4 | 1 | |
| Ray Nitschke | Linebacker | 5 | 4 | 1 | |
| Aaron Rodgers | Quarterback | 5 | 4 | 1 | |
| LeRoy Butler | Safety | 4 | 4 | 0 | |
| James Lofton | Wide receiver | 4 | 1 | 3 | |
| Reggie White | Defensive end | 4 | 2 | 2 | |

== See also ==
- Lists of Green Bay Packers players
