= 1946 All-Pro Team =

Official list of the best NFL players in 1946

The 1946 All-Pro Team consisted of American football players who were chosen by various selectors for the All-Pro team for the 1946 NFL and AAFC seasons. Teams were selected by, among others, the Associated Press (AP), the United Press (UP), Pro Football Illustrated, and the New York Daily News (NYDN). The AP selections included players from the National Football League (NFL) and All-America Football Conference; the UP, PFI, and NYDN selections were limited to players from the NFL.

== NFL All-Pros ==
Position	Player	Team	Selector(s)
Quarterback	Bob Waterfield	Los Angeles Rams	AP-1 [back], UP-1
Quarterback	Sid Luckman	Chicago Bears	AP-2
Halfback	Bill Dudley	Pittsburgh Steelers	UP-1, PFI-1, AP-2
Halfback	Frank Filchock	New York Giants	UP-1
Back	Glenn Dobbs	Brooklyn Dodgers	AP-1
Back	Spec Sanders	New York Yankees	AP-1
Halfback	Hugh Gallarneau	Chicago Bears	PFI-1
Fullback	Ted Fritsch	Green Bay Packers	AP-1 [back], UP-1, PFI-1
End	Jim Benton	Los Angeles Rams	AP-1, UP-1, PFI-1
End	Jim Poole	New York Giants	AP-1, PFI-1
End	Ken Kavanaugh	Chicago Bears	UP-1
Tackle	Bruiser Kinard	New York Yankees	AP-1
Tackle	Al Wistert	Philadelphia Eagles	AP-1, UP-1, PFI-1
Tackle	Jim White	New York Giants	UP-1, AP-2
Tackle	John Adams	Washington Redskins	PFI-1
Guard	Riley Matheson	Los Angeles Rams	AP-1, UP-1, PFI-1
Guard	Bill Radovich	Los Angeles Dons	AP-1
Guard	Augie Lio	Philadelphia Eagles	UP-1
Guard	Ray Bray	Chicago Bears	PFI-1
Guard	Len Younce	New York Giants	AP-2
Center	Bulldog Turner	Chicago Bears	AP-1, UP-1
Center	Charley Brock	Green Bay Packers	PFI-1
