= 1945 All-Pro Team =

Official list of the best NFL players in 1945

The 1945 All-Pro Team consisted of American football players who were chosen by various selectors for the All-Pro team for the 1945 football season. Teams were selected by, among others, the Associated Press (AP), the United Press (UP), the International News Service (INS), Pro Football Illustrated, and the New York Daily News (NYDN).

== Selections ==
Position	Player	Team	Selector(s)
Quarterback	Bob Waterfield	Cleveland Rams	AP-1 [back], UP-1, INS-2, PFI-1, NYDN-1
Quarterback	Sammy Baugh	Washington Redskins	UP-1, INS-1, PFI-2, NYDN-1
Halfback	Steve Van Buren	Philadelphia Eagles	AP-1 [back], UP-1, INS-1, PFI-1, NYDN-1
Halfback	Steve Bagarus	Washington Redskins	AP-1
Halfback	Jim Gillette	Cleveland Rams	INS-1
Halfback	Fred Gehrke	Cleveland Rams	PFI-1
Halfback	Bob Margarita	Chicago Bears	NYDN-1
Fullback	Frank Akins	Washington Redskins	UP-2, INS-1, PFI-1, NYDN-2
Fullback	Bob Westfall	Detroit Lions	AP-1
Fullback	Ted Fritsch	Green Bay Packers	UP-1
End	Don Hutson	Green Bay Packers	AP-1, UP-1, INS-2, PFI-1, NYDN-1
End	Jim Benton	Cleveland Rams	AP-1, UP-2, INS-2, PFI-1, NYDN-1
End	Steve Pritko	Cleveland Rams	UP-1, INS-1
End	Joe Aguirre	Washington Redskins	INS-1
Tackle	Al Wistert	Philadelphia Eagles	AP-1, UP-1, INS-1, PFI-1, NYDN-1
Tackle	Emil Uremovich	Detroit Lions	UP-1, PFI-2, NYDN-1
Tackle	Frank Cope	New York Giants	AP-1
Tackle	Eberle Schultz	Cleveland Rams	INS-1
Tackle	John Adams	Washington Redskins	PFI-1
Guard	Riley Matheson	Cleveland Rams	AP-1, UP-1, INS-2, PFI-1, NYDN-1
Guard	Bill Radovich	Detroit Lions	AP-1, UP-1, INS-1, NYDN-2
Guard	Augie Lio	Boston Yanks	INS-1, NYDN-1
Guard	Stan Batinski	Detroit Lions	PFI-1
Center	Charley Brock	Green Bay Packers	AP-1, UP-1, INS-1, PFI-1, NYDN-1
