= Jim Benton (American football) =

American football player and coach (1916–2001)

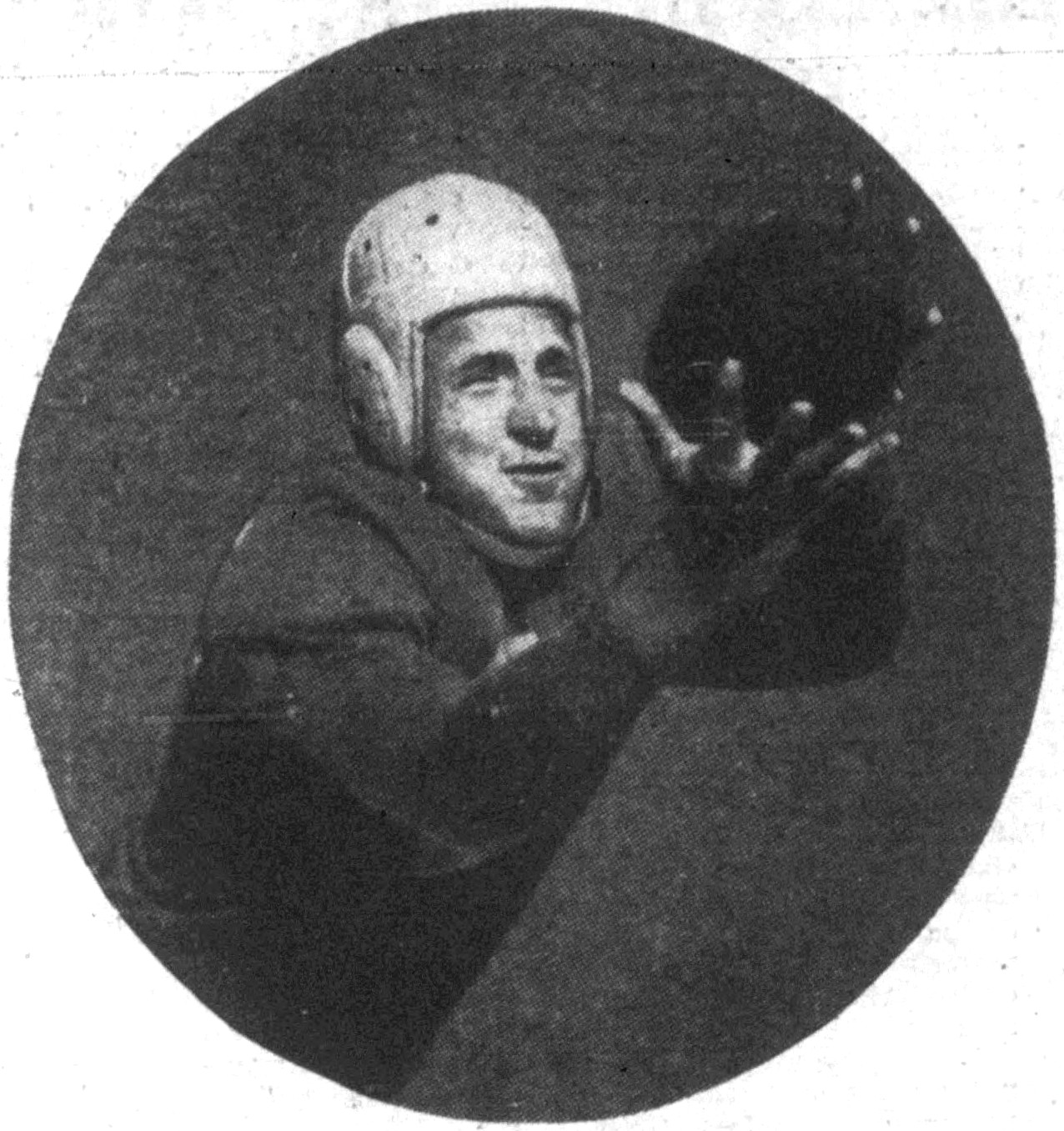
- Benton, circa 1947

No. 26, 30, 12, 49
- Position: End

Personal information
- Born: September 25, 1916; Carthage, Arkansas, U.S.
- Died: March 28, 2001 (aged 84); Pine Bluff, Arkansas, U.S.
- Listed height: 6 ft 3 in (1.91 m)
- Listed weight: 200 lb (91 kg)

Career information
- High school: Fordyce (AR)
- College: Arkansas (1934-1937)
- NFL draft: 1938: 2nd round, 11th overall pick

Career history

Playing
- Cleveland Rams (1938–1940, 1942); Chicago Bears (1943); Cleveland / Los Angeles Rams (1944–1947)

Coaching
- Los Angeles Rams (1948) Wide receivers coach; Arkansas–Monticello (1951–1953) Head coach

Awards and highlights
- 2× NFL champion (1943, 1945); 2× First-team All-Pro (1945, 1946); Pro Bowl (1939); NFL receiving touchdowns leader (1939); 2× NFL receiving yards leader (1945, 1946); NFL receptions leader (1946); NFL 1940s All-Decade Team; First-team All-American (1937); Second-team All-American (1936); 2× First-team All-SWC (1936, 1937); Helms Athletic Foundation Hall of Fame (1960); PRFA Hall of Very Good (2005); Arkansas Razorbacks All-Century Team; Arkansas Sports Hall of Fame; Univ. of Arkansas Sports Hall of Honor

Career NFL statistics
- Receptions: 288
- Receiving yards: 4,801
- Receiving touchdowns: 45
- Stats at Pro Football Reference

James Warren "Big Jim" Benton (September 25, 1916 – March 28, 2001) was an American professional football player. He played professionally in the National Football League (NFL) with the Cleveland / Los Angeles Rams and the Chicago Bears between 1938 and 1947. Benton was the first NFL receiver to gain more than 300 yards in a game, a record that stood for 40 years. He was selected for the National Football League 1940s All-Decade Team.

== College career ==
In 1934, he began his college career at Arkansas and set receiving records unheard of at the time. In 1936, Arkansas defeated Texas 6–0 on a Benton touchdown reception and won its first official Southwest Conference (SWC) championship. In spite of his sophomore year statistics not being included, he finished his career with 83 receptions for 1,303 yards and 12 touchdowns. Despite fewer games and shorter period of sports eligibility compared to today (as well as less emphasis on passing in the era), his receiving statistics stand as the 12th-best career total among Razorbacks. His 48 receptions remained a SWC record until 1963 and an Arkansas record until 1971. In spite of playing more than 70 years ago, he still ranks among the career receiving leaders in the history of Arkansas football.

Benton was selected to several All-America teams following the 1937 season when he led the NCAA in receptions. In 1937, he set the NCAA record in pass receiving with 48 catches for 814 yards and 7 touchdowns. He was all SWC in 1936 and 1937. In 1937, he received the Houston Post Award as the outstanding player of the year in the Southwest Conference, was named first-team All American by the North American Newspaper Alliance and was a member of the College All Star team. He was selected to the Arkansas All-Century team in 1994.

Benton also lettered in basketball for the Razorbacks in 1937 and 1938, with the team winning the 1938 Southwest Conference title.

== Professional career ==
Benton began his NFL career in 1938 with the Cleveland Rams, after being drafted number 11 in the second round. He had a nine-year career, all with the Rams except for one year with the Chicago Bears. In 1941, he dropped out of pro football to coach high school football at Fordyce, Arkansas but returned to the Rams in 1942.

In his first season with the Rams, he led the league with 19.9 average yards per catch, and was third in both receiving yards and touchdowns. He was named to the 1939 Pro Bowl team after leading the league with seven touchdown receptions.

In 1943 due to the depletion of players called to military service, the Rams disbanded, and Benton who had been rejected for military service due to a heart murmur, was loaned to the Chicago Bears. During the season, he caught two touchdown passes to help Sid Luckman set the NFL single game record of seven touchdowns in defeating the New York Giants and caught a touchdown pass in Chicago's world championship victory over the Washington Redskins.

In 1944, back with the Rams, Benton made NFL history by catching 8 consecutive passes for 3 touchdowns against the Cardinal-Steelers. At season's end, he was the second ranked receiver behind fellow Arkansas native Don Hutson.

In 1945, in spite of playing only nine games, Benton ended the season leading the NFL with 1,087 yards receiving. He had 45 receptions and eight touchdowns. He averaged 118.6 yards receiving a game with his longest reception for 84 yards and a touchdown. He went over 100 yards receiving in six of his nine games. His most notable game was on Thanksgiving Day against the Detroit Lions, catching ten Bob Waterfield passes for 303 yards, helping the Rams win the divisional title. This broke Hutson's single game record and stood as the NFL single game record for over 40 years. Benton had nine receptions for 125 yards and a touchdown in the Rams 15–14 victory over the Redskins in the NFL Championship game. Benton's 1945 performance ranks 7th all time in fewest receptions for 1,000 yards.

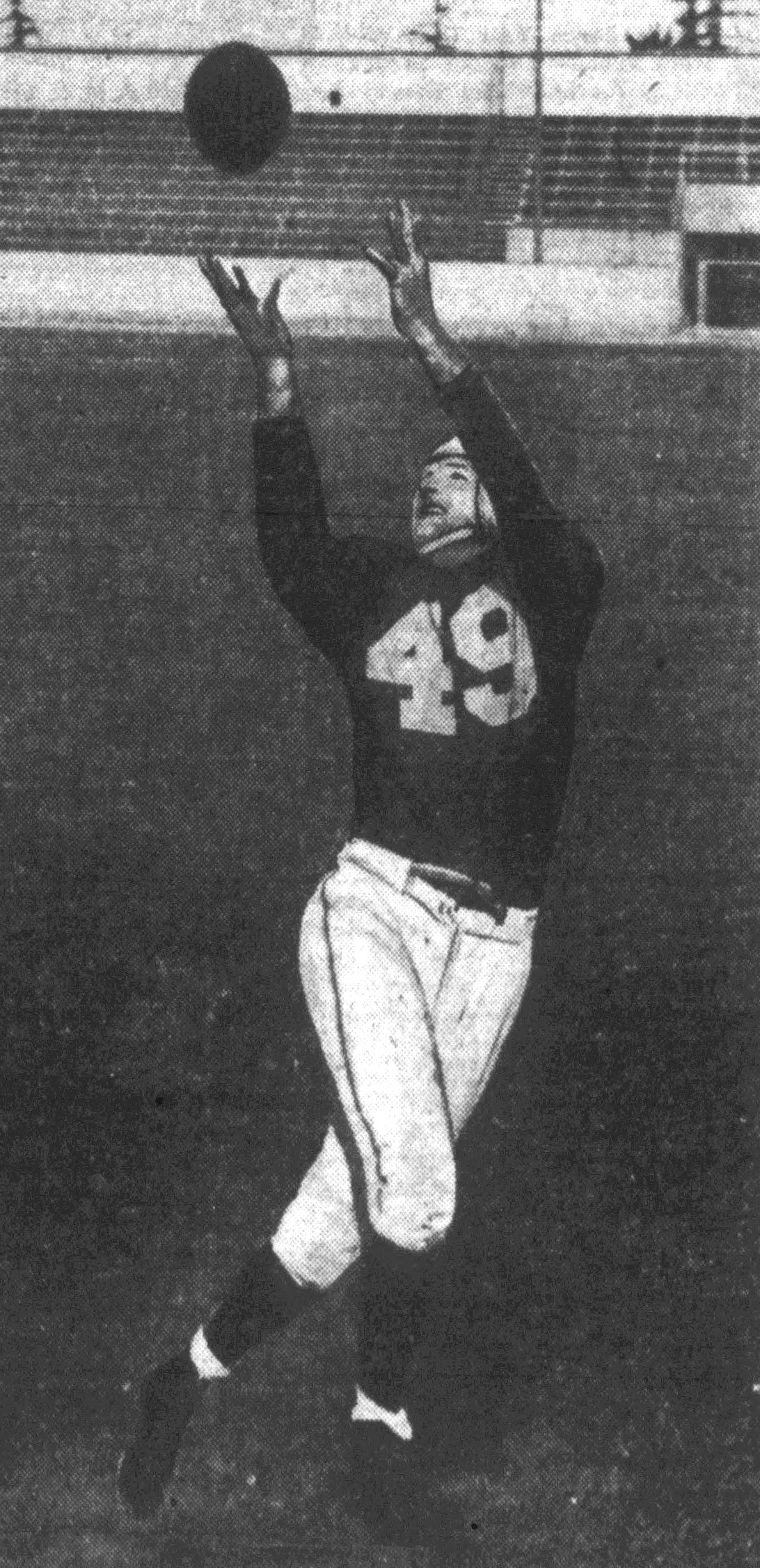
Benton, circa 1947

In 1946, Benton led the NFL with 63 receptions and with 981 yards receiving. During the season his most notable game was against the New York Giants when he had twelve receptions for 202 yards.

Benton was the top ranked NFL receiver in 1945 and 1946. He was consensus all-NFL in 1945 and 1946 and second-team All Pro in 1939 and 1944. He was ranked among the NFL's top five receivers in six of his nine seasons.

When he retired in 1947, Benton was the second leading receiver in pro football history with 288 receptions for 4,801 yards and 45 touchdowns. He and Hutson were the only receivers to lead the league in receiving multiple times. He had at least 11 games over 100 yards receiving (according to The ESPN Pro Football Encyclopedia Second Edition), including a 300-yard game and a 200-yard game. He averaged 533 yards per season and 55 yards per game. Benton played on two world championships, 1943 with the Chicago Bears and 1945 with the Cleveland Rams. He led every major receiving category in the NFL at least once. After having retired over 70 years ago, he remains in the career top 15 major receiving category for the Rams franchise.

In 2005, he was named to the Professional Football Researchers Association Hall of Very Good in the association's third HOVG class.

In 2008, sports historian, writer, statistician, and archivist Sean Lahman had Benton ranked as 54th best wide receiver in the history of the NFL in his award-winning book "The Pro Football Historical Abstract / A Hardcore Fan's Guide to All-Time Player Rankings".

In 2010, ESPN.COM rated Jim Benton's 10 catches for 303 yards on Thanksgiving Day against the Detroit Lions as the greatest regular season receiving performance in NFL history.

== NFL career statistics ==
Legend
	Led the league
	NFL champion
**Bold**	Career high

Year	Team	Games		Receiving					Fumbles
Year	Team	GP	GS	Rec	Yds	Avg	Lng	TD	Fumbles
1938	CLE	**11**	9	21	418	19.9	—	5	—
1939	CLE	**11**	**11**	27	388	14.4	—	7	—
1940	CLE	10	5	22	351	16.0	—	3	—
1942	CLE	9	7	23	345	15.0	45	1	—
1943	CHI	9	7	13	235	18.1	55	3	—
1944	CLE	10	4	19	505	12.9	36	6	—
1945	CLE	9	4	45	**1,067**	**23.7**	**84**	**8**	**2**
1946	LAR	**11**	4	**63**	981	15.6	57	6	1
1947	LAR	**11**	4	35	511	14.6	43	6	1
Career		91	55	288	4,801	16.7	84	45	4

== Coaching career ==
In 1948, Benton helped coach the Ram receivers, including future Hall of Famer Tom Fears. Also, in later years, at the request of George Halas, he helped coach the Bears' receivers.

From 1951 to 1953, Benton was head football coach at Arkansas Agricultural and Mechanical College—now known University of Arkansas at Monticello— leading the team to their first ever Arkansas Intercollegiate Conference (AIC) title in 1953 with a record of 7–1. He was named the AIC coach of the year in 1953 by the Arkansas Democrat.

After coaching, Benton went into the oil business.

== Hall of Fame ==
Benton was inducted into the Dallas County Sports Hall of Fame, the UAM Sports Hall of Fame, The Arkansas Sports Hall of Honor, The Arkansas Sports Hall of Fame, and, in 1997 was named a Living Legend of Southeast Conference football. He was named to the Arkansas Razorback All Century Team, the Rams All Time Team and the Pro Football Hall of Fame 1940s All Decade Team.

== Head coaching record ==
Year	Team	Overall	Conference	Standing	Bowl/playoffs
**Arkansas A&M Boll Weevils** (Arkansas Intercollegiate Conference) (1951–1953)
1951	Arkansas A&M	8–2			
1952	Arkansas A&M	3–4–1	2–2–1	T–3rd	
1953	Arkansas A&M	7–1		1st	
Arkansas A&M:		18–7–1			
Total:		18–7–1			
National championship Conference title Conference division title or championship game berth

== See also ==
- List of NCAA major college football yearly receiving leaders
