= Stan Batinski =

American football player (1917–1990)

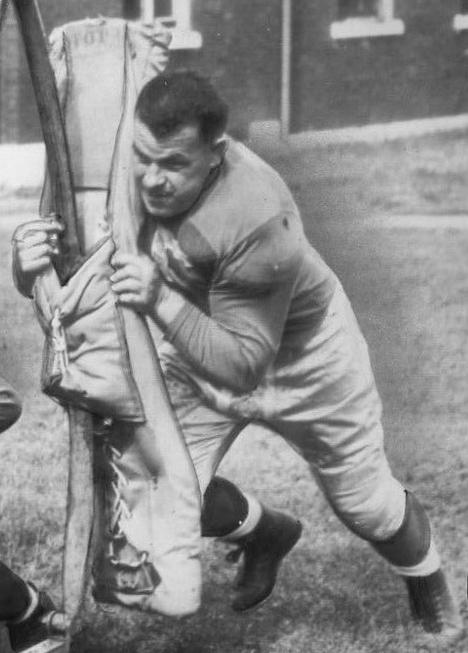
- Batinski in 1946

Profile
- Position: Guard

Personal information
- Born: March 4, 1917; Greenfield, Massachusetts
- Died: January 29, 1990 (aged 72); Greenfield, Massachusetts
- Listed height: 5 ft 10 in (1.78 m)
- Listed weight: 215 lb (98 kg)

Career information
- High school: Greenfield (Greenfield, Massachusetts)
- College: Temple

Career history
- 1941, 1943–1947: Detroit Lions
- 1948: Boston Yanks
- 1949: New York Bulldogs

Stanley "Bull" Batinski (March 4, 1917 – January 29, 1990) was an American football player.

A native of Greenfield, Massachusetts, Batinksi attended Greenfield High School and played college football for Temple University from 1938 to 1940.

He played professional football in the National Football League as guard and tackle for the Detroit Lions (1941, 1943–1947), Boston Yanks (1948), and New York Bulldogs (1949). He appeared in 81 games, 46 as a starter, and was selected by Pro Football Illustrated as a first-team guard on the 1945 All-Pro Team. He missed the 1942 season while serving in the U.S. Army, but returned to the Lions after receiving a medical discharge in February 1943.
