= NFL 1940s All-Decade Team =

Official list of the NFL's best players in the 1940s

This is a list of all NFL players who had outstanding performances throughout the 1940s and have been compiled together into this fantasy group. The team was selected by voters of the Pro Football Hall of Fame retroactively in 1969 to mark the league's 50th anniversary.

All information can be referenced at the Hall of Fame website
| Position | Player | Team(s) | Years | Hall of Fame class |
|---|---|---|---|---|
| Quarterback | Sammy Baugh | Washington Redskins | 1937–52 | 1963 |
| Quarterback | Sid Luckman | Chicago Bears | 1939–50 | 1965 |
| Quarterback | Bob Waterfield | Cleveland/Los Angeles Rams | 1945–52 | 1965 |
| Halfback | Tony Canadeo | Green Bay Packers | 1941–44, 1946–52 | 1974 |
| Halfback | Bill Dudley | Pittsburgh Steelers | 1942, 1945–46 | 1966 |
| Halfback | Bill Dudley | Detroit Lions | 1947–49 | 1966 |
| Halfback | Bill Dudley | Washington Redskins | 1950–51, 1953 | 1966 |
| Halfback | George McAfee | Chicago Bears | 1940–41, 1945–1950 | 1966 |
| Halfback | Charley Trippi | Chicago Cardinals | 1947–55 | 1968 |
| Halfback | Steve Van Buren | Philadelphia Eagles | 1944–51 | 1965 |
| Halfback | Byron White | Pittsburgh Steelers | 1938 | Not Inducted |
| Halfback | Byron White | Detroit Lions | 1940–41 | Not Inducted |
| Fullback | Pat Harder | Chicago Cardinals | 1946–50 | Not Inducted |
| Fullback | Pat Harder | Detroit Lions | 1951–53 | Not Inducted |
| Fullback | Marion Motley | Cleveland Browns^{[1]} | 1946–53 | 1968 |
| Fullback | Marion Motley | Pittsburgh Steelers | 1955 | 1968 |
| Fullback | Bill Osmanski | Chicago Bears | 1939–43, 1946–47 | Not Inducted |
| End | Jim Benton | Cleveland/Los Angeles Rams | 1938–40,1942, 1944–47 | Not Inducted |
| End | Jim Benton | Chicago Bears | 1943 | Not Inducted |
| End | Jack Ferrante | Philadelphia Eagles | 1941, 1944–50 | Not Inducted |
| End | Ken Kavanaugh | Chicago Bears | 1940–41, 1945–50 | Not Inducted |
| End | Dante Lavelli | Cleveland Browns^{[1]} | 1946–56 | 1975 |
| End | Pete Pihos | Philadelphia Eagles | 1947–55 | 1970 |
| End | Mac Speedie | Cleveland Browns^{[1]} | 1946–52 | 2020 |
| End | Ed Sprinkle | Chicago Bears | 1944–55 | 2020 |
| Tackle | Al Blozis | New York Giants | 1942–44 | Not Inducted |
| Tackle | George Connor | Chicago Bears | 1948–55 | 1975 |
| Tackle | Bucko Kilroy | Phil-Pitt Steagles^{[2]} | 1943 | Not Inducted |
| Tackle | Bucko Kilroy | Philadelphia Eagles | 1945–55 | Not Inducted |
| Tackle | Buford "Baby" Ray | Green Bay Packers | 1938–48 | Not Inducted |
| Tackle | Vic Sears | Philadelphia Eagles | 1941–42, 1945–53 | Not Inducted |
| Tackle | Vic Sears | Phil-Pitt Steagles^{[2]} | 1943 | Not Inducted |
| Tackle | Al Wistert | Phil-Pitt Steagles^{[2]} | 1943 | Not Inducted |
| Tackle | Al Wistert | Philadelphia Eagles | 1944–51 | Not Inducted |
| Guard | Bruno Banducci | Philadelphia Eagles | 1944–45 | Not Inducted |
| Guard | Bruno Banducci | San Francisco 49ers^{[1]} | 1946–54 | Not Inducted |
| Guard | Bill Edwards | New York Giants | 1940–42 | Not Inducted |
| Guard | Garrard "Buster" Ramsey | Chicago Cardinals | 1946–51 | Not Inducted |
| Guard | Bill Willis | Cleveland Browns^{[1]} | 1946–53 | 1977 |
| Guard | Len Younce | New York Giants | 1941, 1943–44, 1946–48 | Not Inducted |
| Center | Charley Brock | Green Bay Packers | 1939–47 | Not Inducted |
| Center | Clyde "Bulldog" Turner | Chicago Bears | 1940–52 | 1966 |
| Center | Alex Wojciechowicz | Detroit Lions | 1938–46 | 1968 |
| Center | Alex Wojciechowicz | Philadelphia Eagles | 1946–50 | 1968 |

Notes:

^{1} Team belonged to both the National Football Conference and the All-America Football Conference at different times
^{2} The Philadelphia Eagles and Pittsburgh Steelers were merged into one team for the 1943 season due to World War II
^{3} Four-time finalist to be inducted into the Pro Football Hall of Fame
