= Frank Cope =

American football player (1915–1990)

No. 36, 1
- Position: Offensive tackle

Personal information
- Born: November 19, 1915; Anaconda, Montana, U.S.
- Died: October 8, 1990 (aged 74); San Jose, California, U.S.
- Listed height: 6 ft 2 in (1.88 m)
- Listed weight: 225 lb (102 kg)

Career information
- High school: Hayward (CA)
- College: Santa Clara (1934-1937)
- NFL draft: 1938: undrafted

Career history
- New York Giants (1938–1947)

Awards and highlights
- NFL champion (1938); 2× First-team All-Pro (1944, 1945); 2× NFL All-Star Game (1938, 1940); NFL 1930s All-Decade Team; 81st Greatest New York Giant of All Time

Career NFL statistics
- Games played: 98
- Games started: 61
- Fumble recoveries: 6
- Stats at Pro Football Reference

Francis Wallace Cope (November 19, 1915 – October 8, 1990) was an American professional football offensive tackle in the National Football League (NFL) for the New York Giants. He attended Santa Clara University. Cope played in 98 games while starting 61 of them. He played in six playoff games for the Giants (1938, 1939, 1941, 1943, 1944, 1946).

Cope is one of ten players that were named to the National Football League 1930s All-Decade Team that have not been inducted into the Pro Football Hall of Fame.
