= 1944 All-Pro Team =

Official list of the best NFL players in 1944

The 1944 All-Pro Team consisted of American football players who were chosen by various selectors for the All-Pro team for the 1944 football season. Teams were selected by, among others, the Associated Press (AP), the United Press (UP), the International News Service (INS), Pro Football Illustrated, and the New York Daily News (NYDN).

== Selections ==
Position	Player	Team	Selector(s)
Quarterback	Sid Luckman	Chicago Bears	AP, INS-1, PFI, NYDN-1
Quarterback	Roy Zimmerman	Philadelphia Eagles	UP-1
Halfback	Steve Van Buren	Philadelphia Eagles	AP-1
Halfback	Frank Sinkwich	Detroit Lions	AP [back], UP-1, INS-1 [back], PFI, NYDN-1
Halfback	Ward Cuff	New York Giants	UP-1, PFI
Fullback	Bill Paschal	New York Giants	AP [back], UP-1, INS-1 [back], PFI, NYDN-1
Back	John Grigas	Card-Pitts	INS-1, NYDN-1
End	Don Hutson	Green Bay Packers	AP, UP-1, INS-1, PFI, NYDN-1
End	Joe Aguirre	Washington Redskins	AP, UP-1, INS-1, PFI, NYDN-1
Tackle	Al Wistert	Philadelphia Eagles	AP, UP-1, INS-1, NYDN-1
Tackle	Frank Cope	New York Giants	UP-1, INS-1, PFI
Tackle	Bruiser Kinard	Brooklyn Tigers	AP, NYDN-1
Tackle	Baby Ray	Green Bay Packers	PFI
Guard	Len Younce	New York Giants	AP, UP-1, INS-1, PFI, NYDN-1
Guard	Riley Matheson	Cleveland Rams	AP, UP-1, PFI, NYDN-1
Guard	Augie Lio	Boston Yanks	INS-1
Center	Bulldog Turner	Chicago Bears	AP, UP-1, INS-1, NYDN-1
Center	Alex Wojciechowicz	Detroit Lions	PFI
