= Bob Waterfield =

American football player and coach (1920–1983)

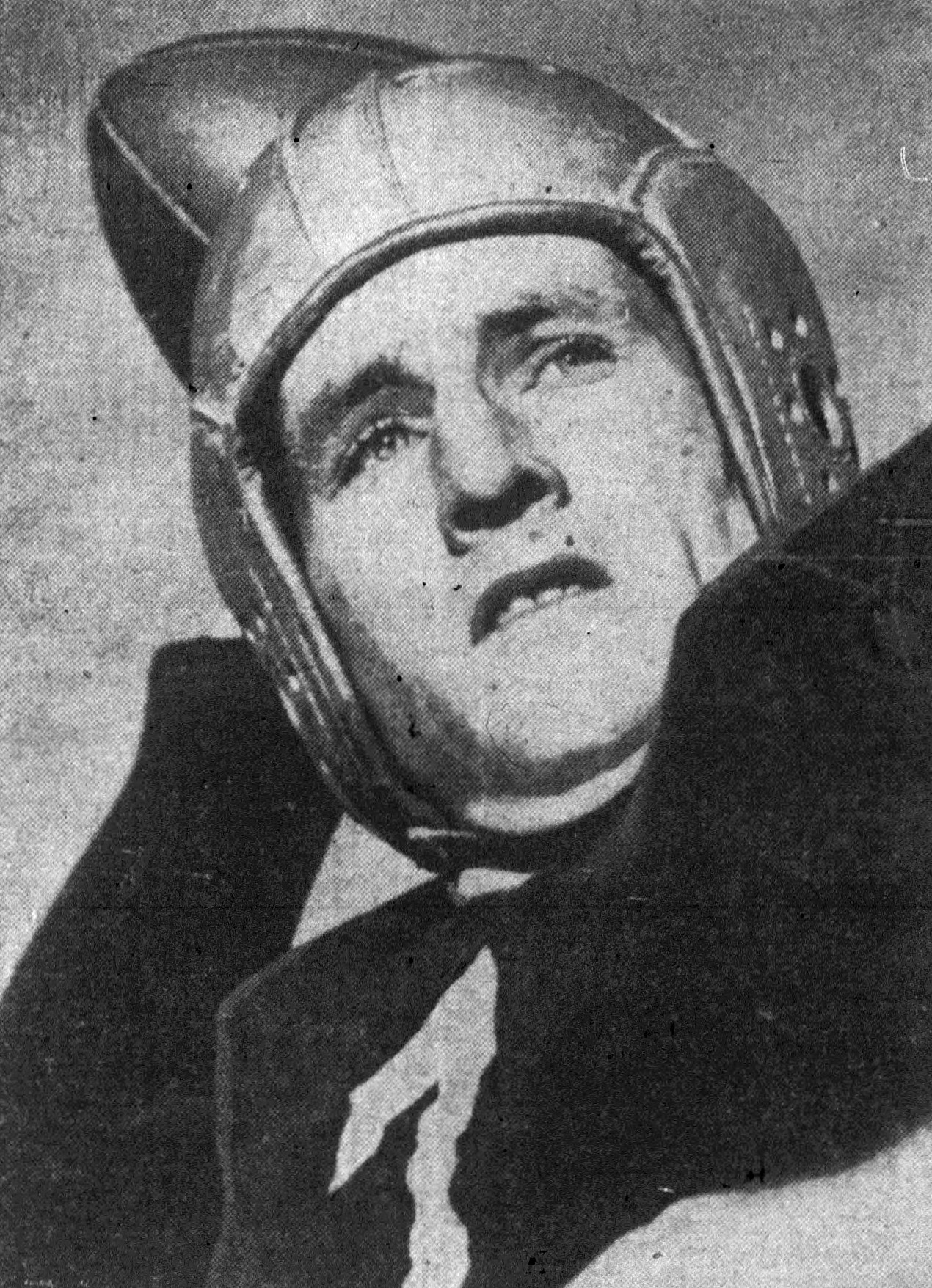
- Waterfield c. 1947

No. 7
- Positions: Quarterback, safety, kicker, punter

Personal information
- Born: July 26, 1920; Elmira, New York, U.S.
- Died: March 25, 1983 (aged 62); Burbank, California, U.S.
- Listed height: 6 ft 1 in (1.85 m)
- Listed weight: 200 lb (91 kg)

Career information
- High school: Van Nuys (Los Angeles, California)
- College: UCLA (1941–1942, 1944)
- NFL draft: 1944: 5th round, 42nd overall pick

Career history

Playing
- Cleveland / Los Angeles Rams (1945–1952)

Coaching
- Los Angeles Rams (1954–1955) Kickers coach; Los Angeles Rams (1958) Quarterbacks coach; Los Angeles Rams (1960–1962) Head coach

Awards and highlights
- 2× NFL champion (1945, 1951); NFL Most Valuable Player (1945); 3× First-team All-Pro (1945, 1946, 1949); 2× Second-team All-Pro (1950, 1951); 2× Pro Bowl (1950, 1951); 2× NFL passing touchdowns leader (1945, 1946); NFL completion percentage leader (1946); NFL passer rating leader (1951); NFL 1940s All-Decade Team; St. Louis Football Ring of Fame; Los Angeles Rams No. 7 retired; First-team All-PCC (1942); Second-team All-PCC (1944)

Career NFL statistics
- TD–INT: 97–128
- Passing yards: 11,849
- Passer rating: 61.6
- Completion percentage: 50.3%
- Interceptions made: 20
- Field goals made: 60
- Punting yards: 13,364
- Points scored: 573
- Stats at Pro Football Reference

Head coaching record
- Career: 9–24–1 (.279)
- Coaching profile at Pro Football Reference
- Pro Football Hall of Fame

Robert Stanton Waterfield (July 26, 1920 – March 25, 1983) was an American professional football player and coach in the National Football League (NFL). A skilled player, he played in the NFL for eight seasons, primarily as a quarterback, but also as a safety, kicker, punter and sometimes return specialist with the Cleveland / Los Angeles Rams. He played college football for the UCLA Bruins. He was inducted into the Pro Football Hall of Fame in 1965. His No. 7 jersey was retired by the Rams in 1952. He was also a motion picture actor and producer.

Born in Elmira, New York, Waterfield moved to Los Angeles as an infant. He played college football for the UCLA Bruins in 1941, 1942, and 1944. In 1942, he led UCLA to a Pacific Coast Conference championship and its first Rose Bowl and was selected as the quarterback on the All-Pacific Coast team.

From 1945 to 1952, he played quarterback for the Cleveland Rams in the NFL. He led the Rams to NFL championships in 1945 and 1951 and was selected as the NFL's most valuable player in 1945. He was the first-team All-Pro quarterback in 1945, 1946, and 1949. Known as one of the best passers, punters, and kickers in the NFL, he set NFL career place-kicking records with 315 extra points and 60 field goals, as well as a single-season record with 54 extra points in 1950, and a single-game record with five field goals in a game.

Waterfield was married to movie actress Jane Russell from 1943 to 1968. During the 1950s, Waterfield also worked in the motion picture business, initially as an actor and later as a producer. He remained involved in football as an assistant coach during the 1950s and served as the head coach of the Rams from 1960 to 1962.

== Early life ==
Waterfield was born in Elmira, New York, in 1920, the son of Staton "Jack" Waterfield (1891–1930) and Frances (Gallagher) Waterfield (1895–1963). In approximately 1921, his family moved to Los Angeles and settled in Van Nuys in the San Fernando Valley. In 1930, when Waterfield was nine years old, his father, who had become the owner and manager of Van Nuys Transfer and Storage Company, died. Waterfield attended Van Nuys High School where he was a star football player.

== UCLA and military service ==
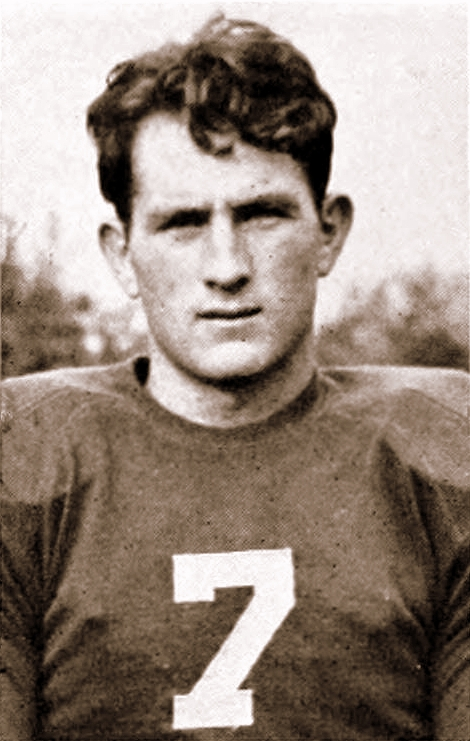
Waterfield in 1942, from the 1943 UCLA yearbook

Waterfield enrolled at the University of California, Los Angeles (UCLA) where he played college football for the Bruins in 1941, 1942, and 1944. During the 1942 regular season, he led the Pacific Coast Conference in passing, completing 53 of 125 passes for 1,033 yards and 12 touchdowns. He also averaged 40 yards on 60 punts and broke the UCLA school record by appearing in 557 of 600 minutes in UCLA's 10 games. He led the 1942 Bruins to the Pacific Coast Conference football championship and was selected as the first-team quarterback on the 1942 All-Pacific Coast football team. In the 1943 Rose Bowl, the Bruins lost to Georgia; the game was scoreless into the fourth quarter when Waterfield's punt was blocked for a safety. Georgia added a touchdown to post a 9–0 win.

In April 1943, Waterfield was married to Jane Russell. Two weeks later, he was inducted into the United States Army and sent to Fort Benning for officer candidate school. He was commissioned as a lieutenant and played quarterback for the 1943 176th Infantry Spirits football team at Fort Benning.

In June 1944, Waterfield was honorably discharged from the Army due to a knee injury. He returned to college, played for the 1944 UCLA football team, and was selected by the Associated Press as a second-team back on the 1944 All-Pacific Coast football team.

In the East–West Shrine Game played on January 1, 1945, Waterfield led the West team with his passing and kicking to a come-from-behind victory. Hailed as a triple-threat star, he had punts of 87, 75, and 59 yards in the game. He caught the winning touchdown pass with three minutes remaining in the game. At the end of his college career, Al Wolf of the Los Angeles Times called him "one of the finest kickers and passers in Coast history."

== Cleveland/Los Angeles Rams ==
Waterfield was drafted by the Cleveland Rams in the fifth round (42nd overall pick) of the 1944 NFL draft. He signed with the Rams in June 1945.

=== 1945 season ===
As a rookie, Waterfield won the starting quarterback job and led the 1945 Rams team to the NFL championship with a 9–1 record. Waterfield led the NFL with 1,627 yards of total offense, 14 touchdown passes and an average of 9.4 yards per attempt. He also led the league with 17 interceptions. As a defensive back, he intercepted 6 passes.

On Thanksgiving Day 1945, Waterfield completed 12 of 21 passes for a season-high 329 yards in a 28–21 victory over the Detroit Lions. Jim Benton caught 10 of Waterfield's passes for an NFL record of 303 receiving yards in a single game.

On December 16, 1945, in the 1945 NFL Championship Game, Waterfield led the Rams to a 15–14 victory over Sammy Baugh's Washington Redskins in below zero weather in Cleveland. One sports writer opined that Waterfield "literally" beat the Redskins "singlehanded." Waterfield was responsible for both Cleveland touchdowns on passes of 37 and 44 yards, and his punts kept the Redskins pinned deep in their territory. Rams owner Dan Reeves announced that, before the game, Waterfield had signed a three-year contract for $20,000 per year, which made him the highest-paid player in pro football.

After the season, Waterfield received the Joe F. Carr Trophy as the NFL's Most Valuable Player, outpacing Steve Van Buren by a tally of 65 points to 38. In this balloting Waterfield became the first unanimous choice for the NFL's MVP honor. He was also a consensus pick as the first-team quarterback on the 1945 All-Pro Team.

=== 1946 season ===
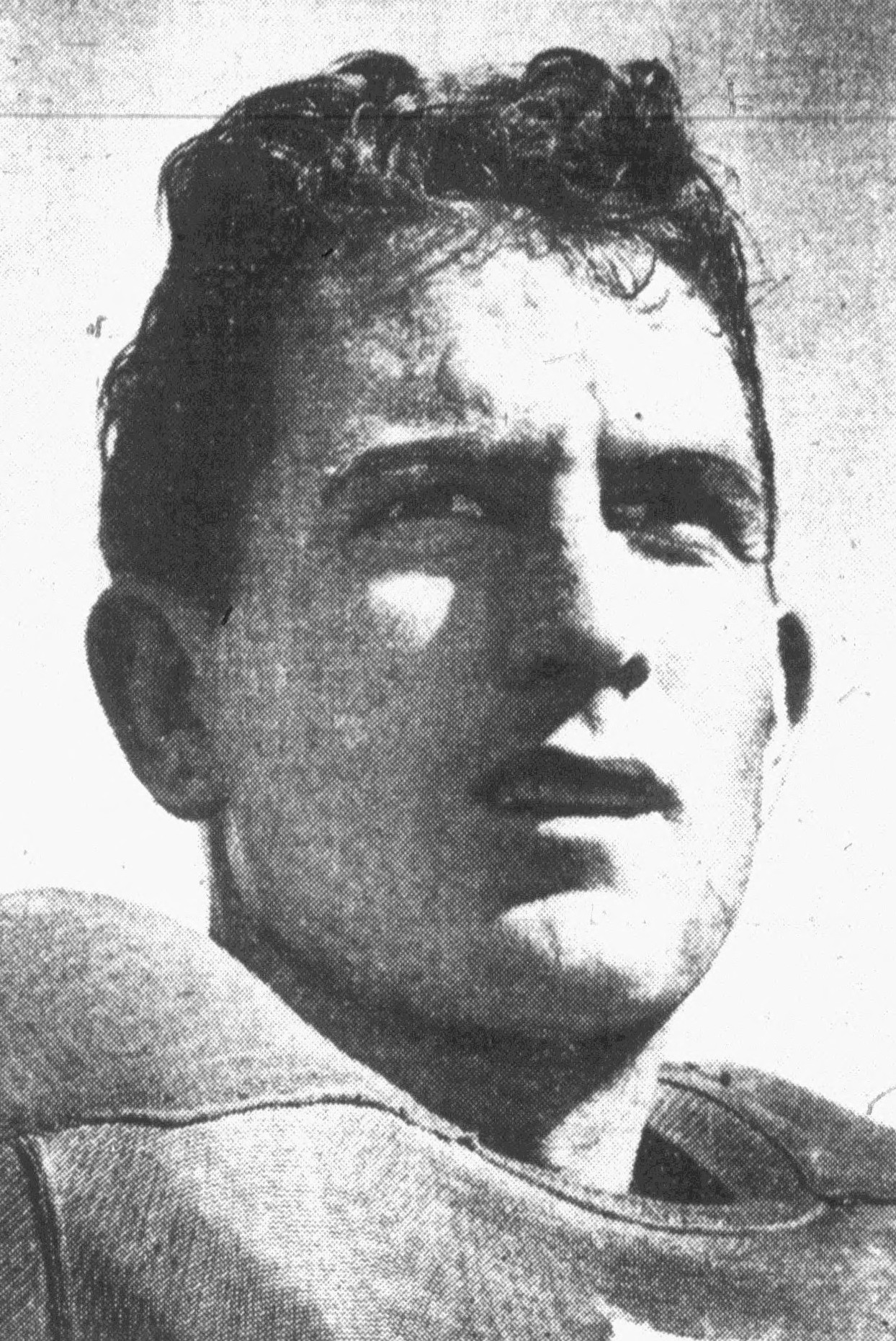
Waterfield, circa 1946

In January 1946, less than a month after winning Cleveland's first NFL championship, the Rams announced that they would move to Los Angeles for the 1946 NFL season. In their first season in Los Angeles, the Rams compiled a 6–4–1 record and finished in second place in the NFL's Western Division. Waterfield firmly established himself as one of the NFL's multi-talented players. As a passer, he led the NFL in pass attempts (251), completions (127), and passing touchdowns (17) and ranked second with 1,747 passing yards and a 67.6 passer rating. He was also the league's second leading scorer (61 points). He led the NFL with 37 extra points out of 37 attempts and field goal percentage (66.7%) and finished third in the league with an average of 44.7 yards per punt. At the end of the season, he was selected by both the Associated Press (AP) and the United Press (UP) as the first-team quarterback on the 1946 All-Pro Team.

=== 1947 and 1948 seasons ===
In 1947, the Rams dropped to fourth place in the NFL's West Division, and Waterfield did not rank among the league's leaders in any passing category except interceptions. He did, however, lead the NFL with seven field goals and had an 86-yard punt that was the longest in the NFL during the 1947 season. In 1948, the Rams finished in third place in the West. Waterfield ranked among the NFL leaders with 15.6 yards per pass completion (first), 14 passing touchdowns (fourth), and 18 interceptions (third), and for the second year had the longest punt in the league, this one measuring 88 yards. On October 4, 1948, Waterfield led the Rams to a 28–28 tie with the NFL champion-to-be Philadelphia Eagles; the Rams trailed, 28–0, in the third quarter, but Waterfield completed 17 of 35 passes for 263 yards and three touchdowns to lead the comeback.

In his first four NFL seasons, Waterfield also played defense and intercepted 20 passes.

=== 1949 season ===
Waterfield and Rams returned to the NFL's elite during the 1949 season. The Rams won the NFL's Western Division championship with an 8–2–2 record and lost to the Philadelphia Eagles in the 1949 NFL Championship Game. In 12 regular season games, Waterfield compiled career highs and ranked among the NFL leaders with 154 completed passes (third), 296 pass attempts (fourth), 2,168 passing yards (second), and 24 interceptions (first). For the third time in his career, he was selected as the quarterback on the 1948 All-Pro Team, receiving first-team honors from the AP and UP.

=== 1950 season ===
In 1950, Norm Van Brocklin was drafted in the fourth round by the Rams. He and Waterfield each started six games that season. Waterfield's 57.3% completion percentage was the best in the NFL for the 1950 season. The 1950 Rams compiled a 9–3 record, won the National Conference championship, defeated the Chicago Bears in a divisional playoff game, and lost to the Cleveland Browns in the 1950 NFL Championship Game. In the playoff game against the Bears, Waterfield came off the bench suffering from the flu and completed 14 of 21 passes for 280 yards, including touchdown passes of 68, 28, and 22 yards to Tom Fears; Waterfield also kicked a 43-yard field goal and three extra points in the game. After the game, George Halas called the Rams "the finest passing team I've ever played against." On the first play from scrimmage in the 1950 NFL Championship Game, Waterfield threw an 82-yard touchdown pass to Glenn Davis, but the Browns prevailed, 30–28.

=== 1951 season ===
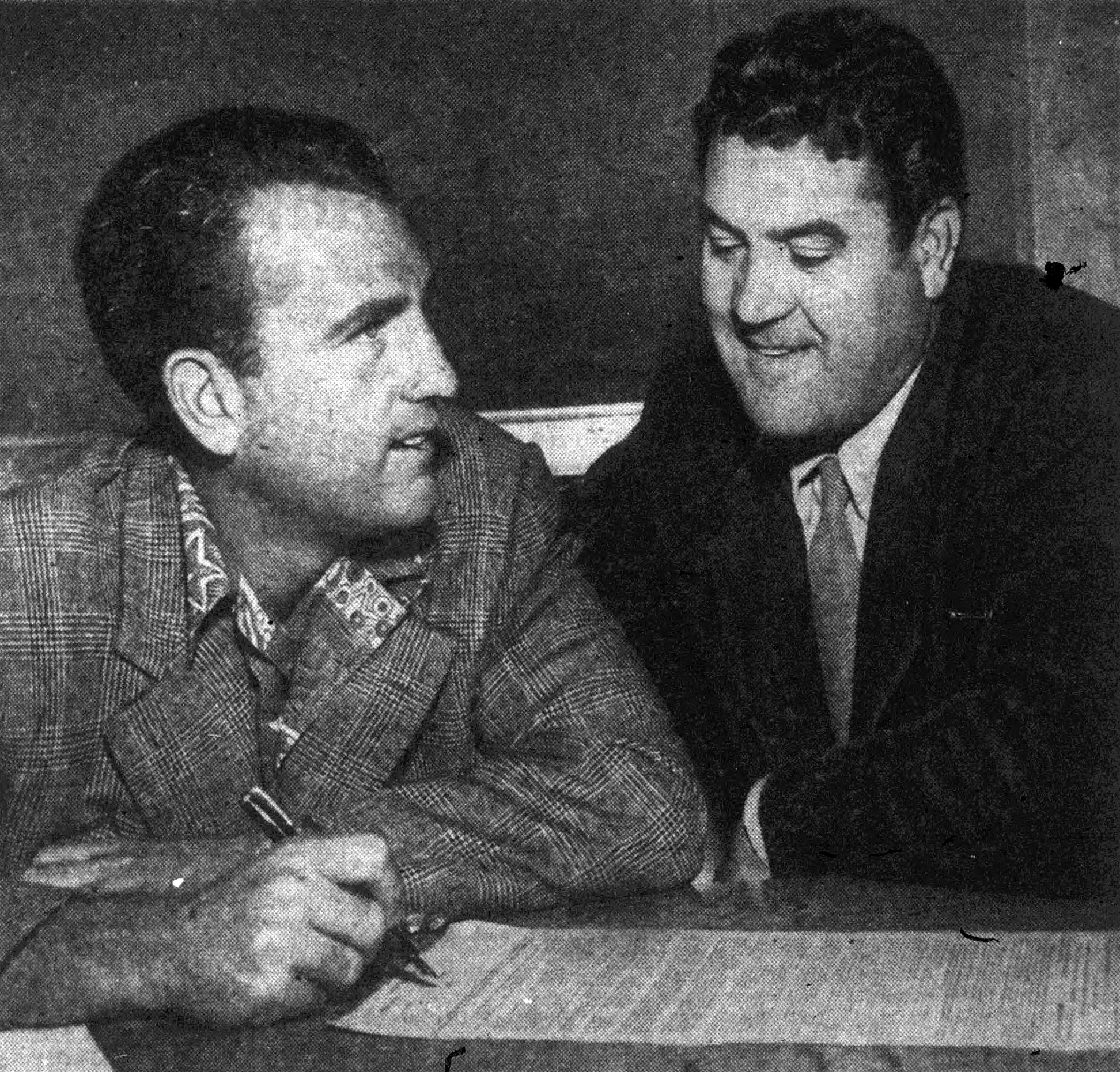
Waterfield (left) signs a 1951 contract with the Los Angeles Rams as head coach Joe Stydahar (right) looks on.

During the off-season following the 1950 season, Waterfield tried his hand at an acting career. He starred with Johnny Weissmuller in "Jungle Manhunt" (also known as "Jungle Jim in the Forbidden Land"), playing the part of a football player stranded in the jungle.

In the fall of 1951, Waterfield resumed his role as the Rams' regular starting quarterback, starting 10 of the Rams' 12 games at the position. He led the 1951 Rams to an 8–4 record and the NFL championship. During the 1951 season, Waterfield led the NFL with an 81.8 passer rating, an average of 17.8 yards per completion, and 13 field goals made. He ranked second in the league with 98 points scored. He also had the longest pass in the NFL during the 1951 season, a 91-yard touchdown pass to Elroy Hirsch in a 42–17 victory over the Chicago Bears. At the end of the 1951 season, Waterfield played in his second Pro Bowl and was selected by the UP as the second-team quarterback (behind Otto Graham) on the 1951 All-Pro Team.

=== 1952 season ===
In 1952, Waterfield shared the Rams' quarterback job with Norm Van Brocklin, each starting six games.

On December 1, 1952, he announced his plan to retire at the end of the season. He was honored with Bob Waterfield Day for the Rams' final home game on December 14, 1952. The Rams retired Waterfield's No. 7 jersey and presented Waterfield with gifts in pregame ceremonies.

The Rams compiled a 9–3 record, tied for best in the National Conference with the Detroit Lions. In the divisional playoff on December 21, he alternated with Van Brocklin on throws and kicked three extra points but threw a late interception as Detroit won 31–21.

=== Career accomplishments ===
At the time of his retirement in December 1952, Waterfield held four NFL career records (315 extra points and 60 field goals), a single-season record with 54 extra points in 1950, and a single-game record with five field goals in a game, and was tied for another single-game record with nine extra points in a game.

During eight seasons with the Rams, he led the team to two NFL championships and four divisional championships. He averaged 42.4 yards as a punter, and he completed 814 passes for 11,849 yards and 97 touchdowns.

== Motion picture producer and football coach ==
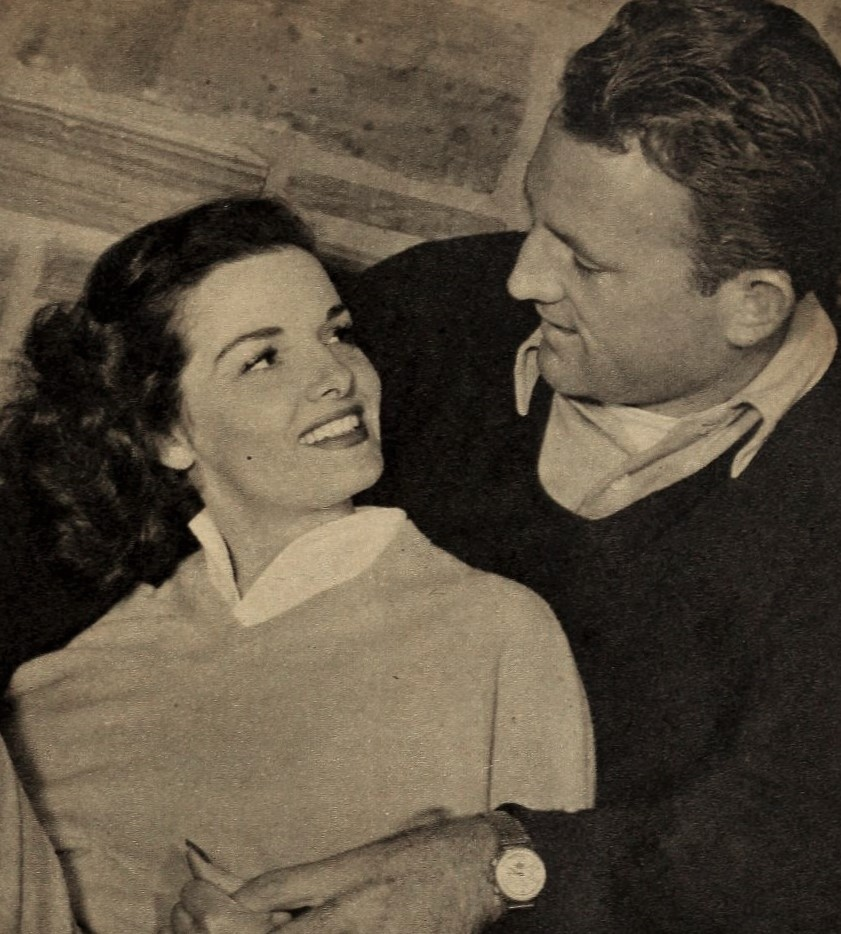
Waterfield with Jane Russell, 1952

In 1954, Waterfield went into business with his wife, movie star Jane Russell, forming Russ-Field Productions to produce motion pictures. Waterfield and Russell had begun dating when she was still a Van Nuys High School student. The couple's productions included Run for the Sun (1956) and The King and Four Queens (1956).

Waterfield also worked as the kicking coach for the Rams in 1954 and again in 1955, working with Rams' linebacker Les Richter on his placekicking. In 1957, he also worked as an assistant coach for the Toronto Argonauts in the Canadian Football League.

In June 1958, Waterfield returned to the NFL as an assistant coach for the Rams. He was assigned to develop the team's quarterbacks. He developed Bill Wade into an outstanding quarterback in 1958, but Waterfield left the team after the 1958 season.

Sid Gillman resigned as the Rams head coach after the team went 2–10 in 1959. In January 1960, Waterfield signed a five-year contract to take over as the Rams' head coach. After two seasons with four wins each, the third season in 1962 was even less successful and he resigned after the eighth game with just one win. Waterfield's overall record as the Rams' head coach was 9–24–1 (.289). He was later a team scout and a rancher near Van Nuys.

== Honors and awards ==
Waterfield received numerous awards and honors for his football career, including the following:

- He was selected as the first-team quarterback on the 1945, 1946, and 1949 All-Pro Teams.
- In 1945, he received the Joe F. Carr Trophy as the NFL's most valuable player.
- He was selected twice to play in the Pro Bowl (1950, 1951).
- In 1952, his jersey No. 7 was retired by the Los Angeles Rams.
- In 1965, he was elected to the Pro Football Hall of Fame as part of the third class of inductees.
- In 1969, he was selected as a quarterback on the NFL 1940s All-Decade Team.

== Family and later years ==
On April 24, 1943, Waterfield married actress Jane Russell, his sweetheart from Van Nuys High School who had subsequently gained fame as a pin-up girl. The couple eloped to Las Vegas shortly after Waterfield entered the military. They adopted three children, Thomas, Tracy, and Robert John, during the 1950s. Russell filed for divorce in February 1967, charging him with abuse, and Waterfield counterclaimed accusing Russell of habitual intemperance and excessive drinking. The divorce was granted in July 1968, with custody of the two oldest children being granted to Russell and custody of the youngest to Waterfield. He married Janet Ann Green in 1970.

After an extended illness, Waterfield died of respiratory failure on March 25, 1983, at the age of 62, five weeks before his former teammate Van Brocklin. He had been in the intensive care unit at St. Joseph Medical Center in Burbank for two weeks prior to his death.

== Head coaching record ==
Team	Year	Regular season					Postseason			
Team	Year	Won	Lost	Ties	Win %	Finish	Won	Lost	Win %	Result
LAR	1960	4	7	1	.375	6th in NFL West	–	–	–	–
LAR	1961	4	10	0	.286	6th in NFL West	–	–	–	–
LAR	1962	1	7	0	.125	7th in NFL West	–	–	–	–
Los Angeles Total		9	24	1	.279		–	–	–	–
