= Charley Brock =

American football player (1916–1987)

- Brock in 1940

No. 29
- Positions: Center, Halfback, Fullback

Personal information
- Born: March 15, 1916; Columbus, Nebraska, U.S.
- Died: May 25, 1987 (aged 71); Green Bay, Wisconsin, U.S.
- Listed height: 6 ft 2 in (1.88 m)
- Listed weight: 207 lb (94 kg)

Career information
- High school: Columbus (NE) Kramer
- College: Nebraska (1935-1938)
- NFL draft: 1939: 3rd round, 24th overall pick

Career history

Playing
- Green Bay Packers (1939–1947)

Coaching
- Green Bay Packers (1949) Defense coach

Awards and highlights
- 2× NFL champion (1939, 1944); First-team All-Pro (1945); 3× Pro Bowl (1939, 1940, 1942); NFL 1940s All-Decade Team; Green Bay Packers Hall of Fame; First-team All-American (1937); Third-team All-American (1938); 2× First-team All-Big Six (1937, 1938); Second-team All-Big Six (1936)

Career NFL statistics
- Games played: 92
- Games started: 47
- Interceptions: 20
- Stats at Pro Football Reference

Charley Jacob Brock (March 15, 1916 – May 25, 1987) was born in Columbus, Nebraska, and was a standout American football player. A two-way star for the Green Bay Packers, Brock excelled as both center and linebacker during his nine-year NFL career from 1939 to 1947. Selected in the third round of the 1939 NFL draft, he quickly established himself as a cornerstone of the Packers' championship teams in 1939 and 1944.

A key contributor to the Packers’ NFL titles in 1939 and 1944, Brock earned praise from Packers coach Curly Lambeau, who called him the best center in football, even above icons like Bulldog Turner. His standout 1945 season saw him named First-Team All-Pro, and he was a three-time Pro Bowl selection (1939, 1940, 1942). Brock’s career stats also include 230 interception return yards and multiple touchdowns from turnovers, showcasing his playmaking ability.

Offensively, he was a reliable center, anchoring the line for Green Bay’s Notre Dame Box offense under Lambeau. Defensively, he was a ball-hawking linebacker, amassing 20 official career interceptions—plus eight more in his rookie year before the NFL tracked the stat. His knack for takeaways was uncanny; he famously snatched the ball from opponents’ hands, including a game-winning touchdown against the Chicago Cardinals in 1942.

He was inducted into the Green Bay Packers Hall of Fame in 1973. After retiring in 1948, Brock briefly coached with the Packers in 1949 and later at the college level. Brock died on May 25, 1987, at age 71.
