= Ted Fritsch =

American athlete (1920–1979)

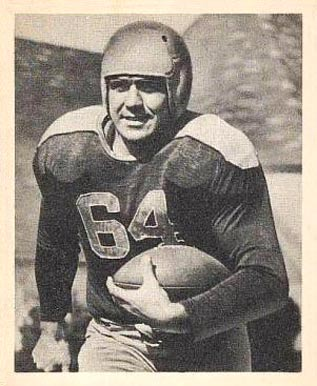
- Fritsch on a 1948 Bowman football card

No. 64
- Position: Running back

Personal information
- Born: October 31, 1920; Spencer, Wisconsin, U.S.
- Died: October 4, 1979 (aged 58); Green Bay, Wisconsin, U.S.
- Listed height: 5 ft 10 in (1.78 m)
- Listed weight: 210 lb (95 kg)

Career information
- High school: Spencer
- College: Wisconsin–Stevens Point (1937–1940)
- NFL draft: 1942: undrafted

Career history
- Green Bay Packers (1942–1950)

Awards and highlights
- NFL champion (1944); 2× Second-team All-Pro (1945, 1946); NFL rushing touchdowns leader (1946); NFL scoring leader (1946); Green Bay Packers Hall of Fame

Career NFL statistics
- Rushing yards: 2,200
- Rushing average: 3.5
- Receptions: 25
- Receiving yards: 227
- Total touchdowns: 35
- Stats at Pro Football Reference

Theodore Leo Fritsch (October 31, 1920 – October 4, 1979) was an American baseball, basketball, and football player who played running back for the National Football League (NFL)'s Green Bay Packers from 1942 to 1950. He also played two seasons for the Oshkosh All-Stars of the National Basketball League (NBA). Fritsch also played as an outfielder for the Portsmouth Cubs, Nashville Vols, and Los Angeles Angels minor league baseball teams in 1944. He attended Spencer High School in Spencer, WI and the High School's football field was named after him. Notre Dame de la Baie High School's football field in Green Bay is also named after him. Fritsch died in 1979 of a heart attack. He was inducted into the Green Bay Packers Hall of Fame. Fritsch was the head coach at Premontre High School in Green Bay.

His son, Ted Fritsch, Jr., also played in the NFL in the 1970s.

Fullback Ted Fritsch (64) moves in to lay a block for teammate Joe Laws against the Chicago Bears, 1942.

== NFL career statistics ==
Legend
| | Won the NFL championship |
| | Led the league |
| **Bold** | Career high |

=== Regular season ===
| Year | Team | Games | | Rushing | | | | | Receiving | | | | |
| Year | Team | GP | GS | Att | Yds | Avg | Lng | TD | Rec | Yds | Avg | Lng | TD |
|---|---|---|---|---|---|---|---|---|---|---|---|---|---|
| 1942 | GNB | 11 | 8 | 74 | 323 | 4.4 | **55** | 0 | **9** | 60 | 6.7 | 31 | 0 |
| 1943 | GNB | 10 | 6 | 54 | 169 | 3.1 | 14 | 4 | 2 | 55 | **27.5** | 32 | 0 |
| 1944 | GNB | 9 | 7 | 94 | 322 | 3.4 | 18 | 4 | 3 | 5 | 1.7 | 13 | 0 |
| 1945 | GNB | 10 | 9 | 89 | 282 | 3.2 | 31 | 7 | 3 | 13 | 4.3 | 9 | 0 |
| 1946 | GNB | 11 | 8 | **128** | **444** | 3.5 | 32 | **9** | 2 | 13 | 6.5 | 12 | **1** |
| 1947 | GNB | 12 | 12 | 68 | 247 | 3.6 | 48 | 6 | 0 | 0 | 0.0 | 0 | 0 |
| 1948 | GNB | 12 | 11 | 37 | 173 | **4.7** | 30 | 0 | 0 | 0 | 0.0 | 0 | 0 |
| 1949 | GNB | 12 | 8 | 69 | 227 | 3.3 | 27 | 1 | 6 | **81** | 13.5 | **35** | 0 |
| 1950 | GNB | 12 | 0 | 7 | 13 | 1.9 | 5 | 0 | 0 | 0 | 0.0 | 0 | 0 |
| | | 99 | 69 | 620 | 2,200 | 3.5 | 55 | 31 | 25 | 227 | 9.1 | 35 | 1 |

=== Playoffs ===
| Year | Team | Games | | Rushing | | | | | Receiving | | | | |
| Year | Team | GP | GS | Att | Yds | Avg | Lng | TD | Rec | Yds | Avg | Lng | TD |
|---|---|---|---|---|---|---|---|---|---|---|---|---|---|
| 1944 | GNB | 1 | 1 | 17 | 58 | 3.4 | 15 | 1 | 1 | 26 | 26.0 | 26 | 1 |
| | | 1 | 1 | 17 | 58 | 3.4 | 15 | 1 | 1 | 26 | 26.0 | 26 | 1 |
