= Bulldog Turner =

American football player and coach (1919–1998)

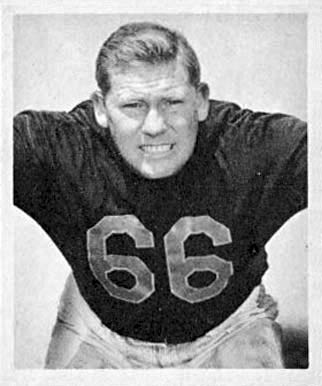
- Turner's 1948 Bowman Gum football card

No. 66, 29
- Positions: Center, linebacker

Personal information
- Born: March 10, 1919; Plains, Texas, U.S.
- Died: October 30, 1998 (aged 79); Gatesville, Texas, U.S.
- Listed height: 6 ft 1 in (1.85 m)
- Listed weight: 237 lb (108 kg)

Career information
- High school: Newman (Sweetwater, Texas)
- College: Hardin–Simmons (1937–1939)
- NFL draft: 1940: 1st round, 7th overall pick

Career history

Playing
- Chicago Bears (1940–1952)

Coaching
- Chicago Bears (1952) Assistant coach; Baylor (1953) Assistant coach; Chicago Bears (1954–1957) Assistant coach; New York Titans (1962) Head coach

Awards and highlights
- 4× NFL champion (1940, 1941, 1943, 1946); 7× First-team All-Pro (1941–1944, 1946–1948); 4× Pro Bowl (1940, 1941, 1950, 1951); NFL interceptions leader (1942); NFL 1940s All-Decade Team; Chicago Bears No. 66 retired; 100 greatest Bears of All-Time; Third-team All-American (1939); First-team Little All-American (1939)

Career NFL statistics
- Games played: 138
- Games started: 127
- Interceptions: 17
- Interception yards: 298
- Fumble recoveries: 5
- Total touchdowns: 4
- Stats at Pro Football Reference

Head coaching record
- Career: 5–9 (.357)
- Coaching profile at Pro Football Reference
- Pro Football Hall of Fame
- College Football Hall of Fame

Clyde Douglas "Bulldog" Turner (March 10, 1919 – October 30, 1998) was an American professional football player and coach in the National Football League (NFL). He was elected, as a player, to the College Football Hall of Fame in 1960 and the Pro Football Hall of Fame in 1966. He was also selected in 1969 to the NFL 1940s All-Decade Team.

Turner played college football as a center at Hardin–Simmons University from 1937 to 1939 and was selected as a Little All-American in 1939. After being selected by the Chicago Bears in the first round of the 1940 NFL draft, he played professional football for the Bears, principally as a center on offense and linebacker on defense, for 13 years from 1940 to 1952. He was selected as a first-team All-Pro eight times (1940–1944, 1946–1948) and was a member of Bears teams that won NFL championships in 1940, 1941, 1943, and 1946.

After his playing career was over, Turner held assistant coaching positions with Baylor University (1953) and the Chicago Bears (1954–1957). He was the head coach of the New York Titans of the American Football League (AFL) during the 1962 AFL season.

== Early life ==
Turner was born in Plains, Texas, in 1919, the son of Willie Lloyd Turner (1895–1973) and Ida Fay (Rushing) Turner (1893–1984). He attended Sweetwater High School in Sweetwater, Texas. He played high school football for Sweetwater High at age 15 in 1934.

== College career ==
Turner enrolled at Hardin–Simmons University in Abilene, Texas, in 1936 at age 17. As a freshman, he weighed 172 pounds and "showed no outward signs of developing into a football player." By the fall of his sophomore year, Turner had gained 18 pounds and won the job as the starting center on the Hardin–Simmons Cowboys football team. By his senior year, he had increased his weight to 235 pounds.

Early in his career at Hardin–Simmons, Turner and teammate A. J. Roy encouraged each other in practice sessions by referring to each other by nicknames. Turner was given the nickname "Bulldog", and Roy was known as "Tiger". Turner later recalled his college experience as follows: "We got room, board and tuition, but we had to buy our own books and we were supposed to take care of two jobs. I had to sweep out the gym and wait tables, but I kind of farmed out the sweeping after a while. It was tough but I loved it. And the more I played, the more I liked the game."

In September 1938, Turner first gained national attention when Associated Press photographer Jimmy Laughead, playing off Turner's strength and his background growing up in West Texas Hereford cattle country, took his picture posing with a 240-pound calf around his shoulders. Turner later recalled posing with the calf: "That day about did me in. I don't think I've ever been so tired in my life."

Turner played center for Hardin–Simmons for three years, and during that time, the football team compiled records of 8–0–1 in 1937, 8–2 in 1938, 7–1–1 in 1939. At the end of the 1939 season, Turner was selected by the New York Sun as the first-team center on the 1939 College Football All-America Team. He was also named to the Associated Press "Little All-America" team. He played in post-season all-star games including the East–West Shrine Game on January 1, 1940, and the Chicago College All-Star Game on August 29, 1940.

== Professional playing career ==
In December 1939, Turner was selected by the Chicago Bears with the seventh overall pick in the first round of the 1940 NFL draft. He was the only lineman selected in the first ten picks. In June 1940, Turner signed a three-year contract with the Bears.

While Turner was in college, he was the subject of recruitment efforts by George Richards, the owner of the Detroit Lions. An NFL investigation concluded that Richards had tampered with Turner by paying for Turner's dental work, giving him $100, and advising him to announce publicly that he would not play professional football so as to dissuade other teams from drafting him. The NFL fined the Lions $5,000 for the violation.

As a rookie, Turner, at age 21, appeared in 11 games, nine of them as the starting center, for the 1940 Chicago Bears team that compiled an 8–3 record and defeated the Washington Redskins, 73–0, in the NFL Championship Game. In the championship game, Turner intercepted a Sammy Baugh pass and returned it 29 yards for a touchdown. At the end of the 1940 season, he was selected as a first-team All-Pro by the Chicago Herald-American and as a second-team All-Pro by the National Football League (NFL), United Press (UP), and International News Service (INS). He was one of only two rookies (Don Looney was the other) to receive All-Pro honors in 1940.

In 1941, Turner appeared in all 11 games, 10 as a starter, for the 1941 Bears that compiled a 10–1 and again won the NFL championship. Turner was selected as the All-Pro center, receiving first-team honors on the so-called "official" All-Pro team selected by a committee of professional football writers for the NFL, as well as All-Pro teams selected by the Associated Press (AP), UP, Collyer's Eye (CE), the New York Daily News (NYDN), and the Chicago Herald American. The consensus selection of Turner as the NFL's top center marked a transition from Mel Hein, who had been a consensus All-Pro at the position for the prior nine years. Turner was a unanimous All-Pro pick by the UP sports writers.

In 1942, Turner started all 11 games and helped the Bears win the NFL Western Division title with an 11–0 record, though the team lost to the Washington Redskins in the 1942 NFL Championship Game. Turner led the NFL with eight interceptions in 1942. He scored two touchdowns, one on an interception return and the other on a fumble recovery and return. At the end of the 1942 season, Turner was selected as the first-team center on the All-Pro team by the NFL, AP, INS, and NYDN. Jack Mahon of the INS wrote that Turner "was in a class by himself at center this season." Though invited to play in the Pro Bowl, he was unable to do so due to a throat infection.

In 1943, Turner started all 10 games and helped the Bears win their third NFL championship in four years. He was selected as a first-team All-Pro by the AP, UP, INS, NYDN, and Pro Football Illustrated (PFI). He was a unanimous pick by the AP sports writers.

In 1944, Turner appeared in all 10 games for the Bears team that compiled a 6–3–1 record and finished in second place in the NFL Western Division. On December 3, 1944, Turner was shifted into the backfield late in a game against Card-Pitt; he had a 48-yard run for the only rushing touchdown of his career. He was selected as a first-team All-Pro by the AP, UP, INS, and NYDN. In his first five seasons with the Bears, he appeared in 58 consecutive games, played all 60 minutes in eight of those games, and won three NFL championships.

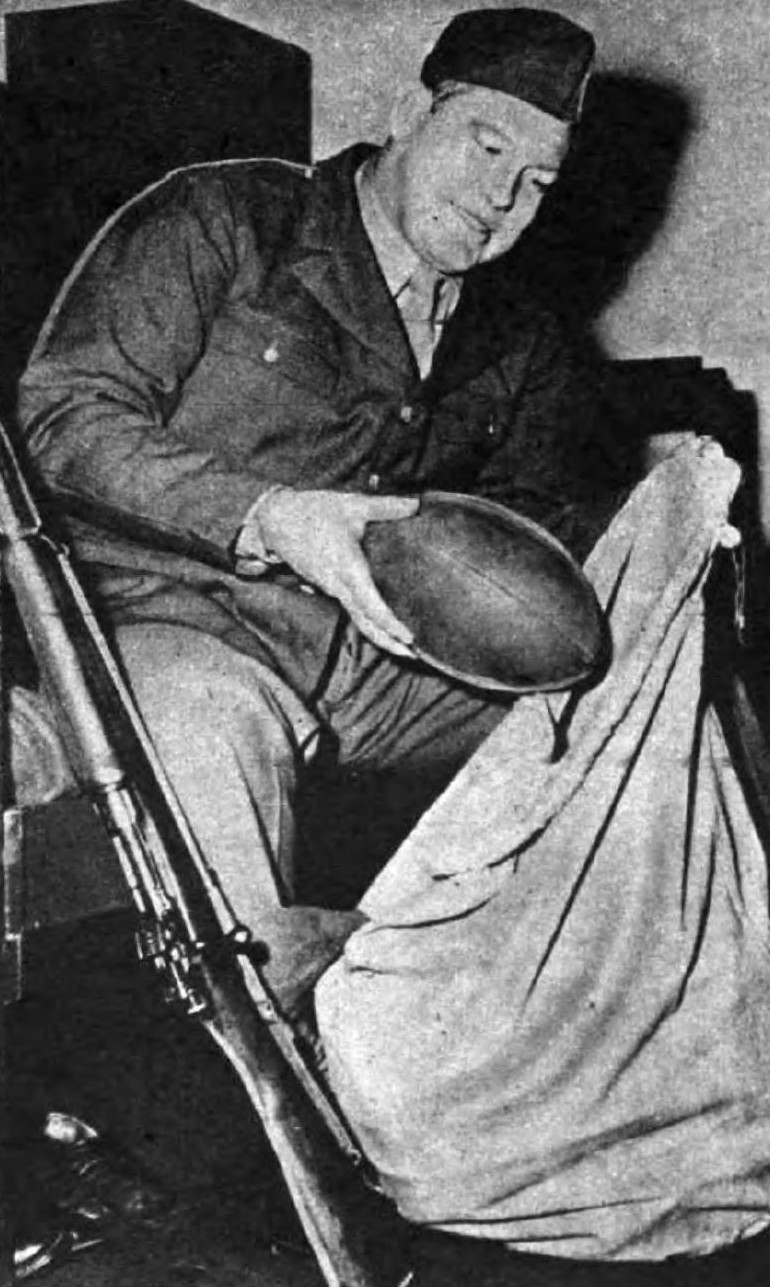
At United States Army Air Forces basic training, 1945

In January 1945, Turner was inducted into the United States Army Air Forces and was assigned as a physical training instructor. In 1945, he played for the Second Air Force Superbombers football team in Colorado Springs, Colorado. He was granted furlough to play two games for the Bears and then returned to the Superbombers team where he finished the 1945 football season. At the end of the season, Turner was the leading pick on the All-Army Air Forces conference football team.

In March 1946, Turner rejected offers to play in the All-America Football Conference and signed a contract to return to the Bears. He appeared in all 11 games, and helped lead the 1946 Bears to another NFL championship. At the end of the season, Turner was selected as a first-team All-Pro by the AP, UP, and NYDN.

In 1947, Turner appeared in all 12 games for a Bears team that compiled an 8–4 record and finished in second place in the NFL Western Division. During the 1947 season, Turner intercepted a Sammy Baugh pass and returned it 96 yards for a touchdown, a moment that Turner later selected as the highlight of his career. At the end of the season, he was picked as a first-team All-Pro by the AP, NYDN, and PFI.

In 1948, Turner again appeared in all 12 games for the Bears team that compiled a 10–2 record and again finished in second place in the NFL Western Division. For the eighth and final time, Turner was selected as a first-team All-Pro center, receiving first-team honors from AP, UP, PFI, and The Sporting News.

Turner continued to play for the Bears for four more years, appearing in all 12 games each year from 1949 to 1952. In his final year, he played at the offensive tackle position. In 13 NFL seasons, Turner appeared in 138 regular season games and seven post-season games. He intercepted 17 passes in the regular season and four more in five NFL championship games. He was selected as a first-team All-Pro in eight of his 13 seasons.

Turner was big for his day (6 ft 1 in (1.85 m), 237 lb (108 kg)); however, he was smart and very fast. Turner later boasted about his talent as a blocker: "I was such a good blocker, that the men they put in front of me – and some were stars who were supposed to be making a lot of tackles – they would have their coaches saying, 'why ain't you making any tackles?' they'd say, 'that bum Turner is holding.' Well that wasn't true. . . . I could handle anybody that they'd put in front of me." According to George Halas, Turner was "perhaps the smartest player" he had in 40 years as the Bears' coach, a player who "knew every assignment for every player on every player." Teammate George Musso once said of Turner, "Who knows what kind of player he would have been if he ever got to rest during a game?"

== Coaching career ==
=== Assisting coaching ===
During the 1952 NFL season, Turner was both a player for the Bears and an assistant coach responsible for instructing the guards and centers.

In January 1953, after retiring as a player, Turner was hired as an assistant line coach at Baylor University in Waco, Texas. He had a ranch in nearby Gatesville, and was responsible for coaching the offensive centers and defensive linebackers. He resigned his post at Baylor in February 1954.

Turner was an assistant coach for the Bears from 1954 to 1957. He worked from the pressbox and communicated by telephone to George Halas about weaknesses he had observed in opponents' defenses. He gave up his job with the Bears in 1958 to devote his full efforts to his ranch in Texas.

=== New York Titans ===
In December 1961, Turner was hired as the head coach of the New York Titans of the American Football League. Despite a pre-season injury to All-AFL fullback Bill Mathis, whose 846 rushing yards was second best in the 1961 AFL season, the Titans opened the season with a 2–1 record. However, owner Harry Wismer was broke and unable to pay the players, who refused to practice and went on a two-day strike. Wismer threatened to put the entire team on waivers, and his erratic behavior, including hastily placing six starters on waivers after a loss and threatening to sue the Denver Broncos after quarterback Lee Grosscup was injured on a hard tackle, caused the Titans to be described as "the kookiest franchise in professional football." Even with financial assistance from other AFL clubs, the Titans' payroll deficiencies continued, and Turner had to expend energy just enticing his team to suit up. The team drew only 36,161 spectators to seven home games and finished with a 5–9 record. The team was sold in March 1963 and became the New York Jets. Turner was fired that same month.

== Honors ==
Turner received numerous honors for his accomplishments as a football player. His honors include the following:

- In 1951, he was inducted into the Helms Athletic Foundation's Professional Football Hall of Fame. He was the second Texan to be so honored, following Sammy Baugh.
- When Turner ended his playing career, the Bears retired his jersey No. 66. As of 1964, only six numbers had been retired by the Bears: Turner (No. 66); Bronko Nagurski (No. 3); George McAfee (No. 5); Sid Luckman (No. 42); Bill Hewitt (No. 58); and Red Grange (No. 77).
- In 1960, he was inducted into the National Football Foundation's Hall of Fame (later renamed the College Football Hall of Fame).
- In 1961, he was inducted into the Texas Sports Hall of Fame.
- In 1966, he was inducted into the Pro Football Hall of Fame. He was selected as part of the fourth class of inductees and was the third center (following Mel Hein and George Trafton) to be so honored.
- In 1969, as part of the NFL's 50th anniversary, the Pro Football Hall of Fame selected all-decade teams for each of the league's first five decades. Turner was selected as a center on the NFL 1940s All-Decade Team.
- Also in 1969, Turner was selected by a panel of the Football Writers Association of America to the All-Southwest football team of the preceding 50 years.
- In 1975, he was selected to the Texas All-Pro football team, made up of professional football players who once played college football in Texas. Turner was the "biggest landslide winner on the team."
- In 1979, he was selected as one of the inaugural inductees into the Hardin-Simmons Athletic Hall of Fame.
- ESPN rated Turner No. 7 on its list of the 50 greatest Chicago Bears.

== Family and later years ==
Turner was married twice. His first wife was Helen W. Turner with whom he had a daughter, Patricia. He was later married to Gladys Webber (1925–1988) on July 4, 1948.

In 1950, Turner purchased a 1,200-acre ranch in Pidcoke, Coryell County, Texas, for $54,000. He moved from Chicago to the ranch on a full-time basis in April 1958.

After spending 1962 in New York as coach of the New York Titans, he returned to his ranch and began racing horses. In 1965, he purchased a second ranch in New Mexico to pursue his interest in breeding horses. He also raced his horses at Sunland Park and Ruidoso Downs in New Mexico.

In the 1970s, Turner moved to Omaha, Nebraska, where he took a job as a manager for Interstate Steel Co. In 1974, while on a business trip to Chicago, he suffered a stroke at age 55. In the 1980s, Turner developed further health problems, including diabetes, cancer, and heart disease requiring installation of a pacemaker. His wife, Gladys, also contracted lung cancer, and the couple lived in a house trailer on their Texas ranch. Suffering financial troubles, he qualified in 1987 for an NFL pension of $780 per month.

His wife died in October 1988 after 40 years of marriage. In his later years, Turner also suffered from emphysema, and in March 1998, he was diagnosed with lung cancer. He died at age 79 at his ranch near Gatesville, Texas. He was buried in Greenbriar Cemetery in Gatesville.

== Head coaching record ==
=== NFL ===
Team	Year	Regular season					Postseason			
Team	Year	Won	Lost	Ties	Win %	Finish	Won	Lost	Win %	Result
NYJ	1962	5	9	0	.357	4th in AFL East	-	-	-	
Total		5	9	0	.357					
