= Riley Matheson =

American gridiron football player (1914–1987)

No. 28, 16, 11, 83, 37
- Position: Offensive tackle

Personal information
- Born: December 12, 1914; Shannon, Texas, U.S.
- Died: June 1987 (aged 72); Paraguay
- Listed height: 6 ft 2 in (1.88 m)
- Listed weight: 207 lb (94 kg)

Career information
- High school: Headrick (OK)
- College: Cameron (1935-1936); UTEP (1937-1938)
- NFL draft: 1939: undrafted

Career history
- Cleveland Rams (1939); Columbus Bullies (1939); Cleveland Rams (1940–1942); Detroit Lions (1943); Cleveland / Los Angeles Rams (1944–1947); San Francisco 49ers (1948); Calgary Stampeders (1949–1950)

Awards and highlights
- NFL champion (1945); 2× CFL All-Star (1949, 1950); 6× First-team All-Pro (1941-1942, 1944-1947)

Career NFL statistics
- Games played: 97
- Games started: 58
- Fumble recoveries: 3
- Stats at Pro Football Reference

Riley M. Matheson (December 12, 1914 – June 1987) was an American professional football player who was an offensive lineman for ten seasons in the National Football League (NFL) for the Cleveland / Los Angeles Rams, the Detroit Lions, and the San Francisco 49ers.

Born on December 12, 1914, in Shannon, Texas. After attending high school in Oklahoma then attended college at Cameron Junior College (now Cameron University) in Lawton, Oklahoma, and later transferred to Texas-El Paso (UTEP), known then as Texas College of Mines and Metallurgy. He was an all-conference player at both schools before beginning his professional career.

Riley Matheson established himself as a key player for the Cleveland Rams from 1940 to 1942, anchoring the offensive line as a guard. In 1941 he was United Press All-NFL Team and second-team All-NFL on the official NFL team. The following season he was first-team All-NFL on the Associated Press squad.

In 1943, when the Rams halted operations for a season due to World War II, he suited up for the Detroit Lions. Returning to Cleveland in 1944, Matheson hit his stride, earning selections to both the Associated Press and United Press All-NFL Teams in 1944 and 1945. Beyond his role as a guard, he showcased his versatility and leadership by calling defensive signals from the linebacker position. Matheson was a cornerstone of the Rams’ 1945 NFL Championship victory.

After the Rams moved to Los Angeles in 1946 Matherson continued to be an All-Pro making All-NFL that season and also in 1947. From 1944 through 1947 the Rams led the NFL in yards per rush and twice led the NFL in rushing yards.

Often calling the signals for the Rams’ defense, he had an ability to read plays that some people consider to be almost supernatural. New York Giants scout Jack Lavelle once stated, “Matheson has a sixth sense or something. He’s fast and strong. Riley must make 90 percent of the Ram tackles, or so it seems.” Los Angeles writers were equally effusive. Ned Cronin of the Los Angeles Daily News called him “one of the best defensive guards to ever grace a National League roster,” while Maxwell Stiles of the Los Angeles Daily Mirror dubbed him “one of the finest defensive linemen or linebackers I’ve ever seen.”

During his tenure with the Rams, fans and teammates adored him so much that they organized a “Riley Matheson Day” while he was still an active player—an unheard-of honor. He received a new station wagon, cash from the Rams’ faithful, and a gold watch from his teammates.

After eight seasons with the Rams and a stint with the Lions, Matheson joined the San Francisco 49ers in 1948 and was briefly playing in the rival All-America Football Conference (AAFC), where he earned second-team All-AAFC honors while playing linebacker for the Niners. His adaptability shone again when he closed his career with the Canadian Football League’s Calgary Stampeders, earning All-Star nods in both 1949 and 1950.

In 1949 the International News Service named Matheson to its All-Time NFL team as one of the guards, along with Hall of Fame guard Dan Fortmann

In 2010, the Professional Football Researchers Association named him to its Hall of Very Good, a nod to his excellence, but it’s a consolation prize compared to Canton. The Professional Football Researchers Association named Matheson to the PRFA Hall of Very Good Class of 2010.

For his career, Matheson was first-team All-NFL six times (five by the Associated Press), second-team All-NFL once (1943)and second-team All-AAFC once and w, and all-Western conference in the CFL twice. He played 97 games in the NFL and 24 in the CFL. He finished his pro career with 14 interceptions.
