= Augie Lio =

American football player (1918–1989)

- Augie in 1947

No. 61, 73, 41, 62, 37
- Positions: Guard, tackle

Personal information
- Born: April 30, 1918; East Boston, Massachusetts, U.S.
- Died: September 3, 1989 (aged 71); Clifton, New Jersey, U.S.
- Listed height: 6 ft 0 in (1.83 m)
- Listed weight: 234 lb (106 kg)

Career information
- High school: Passaic (Passaic, New Jersey)
- College: Georgetown (1937-1940)
- NFL draft: 1941: 4th round, 30th overall pick

Career history
- Detroit Lions (1941–1943); Boston Yanks (1944–1945); Philadelphia Eagles (1946); Baltimore Colts (1947)

Awards and highlights
- 4× Second-team All-Pro (1943-1946); 2× Pro Bowl (1941, 1942); First-team All-American (1940)

Career NFL/AAFC statistics
- Games played: 72
- Games started: 58
- Fumble recoveries: 5
- Stats at Pro Football Reference
- College Football Hall of Fame

Agostino Salvatore "Augie" Lio (April 30, 1918 – September 3, 1989) was an American professional football offensive lineman in the National Football League (NFL) for the Detroit Lions, Boston Yanks, and the Philadelphia Eagles. He also played in the All-America Football Conference (AAFC) for the Baltimore Colts. He was inducted to the College Football Hall of Fame in 1979.

== Biography ==
Lio as a collegian at Georgetown University.

Lio played high school football at Passaic High School in Passaic, New Jersey. He then played college football at Georgetown University and was selected as a first-team All-American in 1940 by the Hearst newspapers, the Central Press Association, Collier's Weekly, and the New York Sun. He was drafted in the fourth round of the 1941 NFL draft.

After retiring from football in 1947 Lio spent the next 37 years at The Herald & News of Passaic, N.J. as a sports editor, columnist and writer covering the NY Giants.
