= NFL 100th Anniversary All-Time Team =

Selection of American football players and coaches

The National Football League 100th Anniversary All-Time Team was voted on by a panel consisting of media members, former players and league personnel in 2019 to honor the greatest players of the first 100 years of the National Football League (NFL).

When the team was announced, members Tom Brady, Larry Fitzgerald, and Adam Vinatieri were the only active players and Bill Belichick the only active head coach. It also included Rob Gronkowski, who was retired in 2019, but returned to NFL play in 2020 and 2021. Brady was the sole remaining active player when he retired after the 2022 NFL season. Johnny Unitas, Jim Brown, Gale Sayers, Don Hutson, Gino Marchetti, and Dick "Night Train" Lane are also part of the NFL 50th Anniversary All-Time Team and the NFL 75th Anniversary All-Time Team. Chuck Bednarik is on the 50th and 100th Anniversary teams and the 75th Anniversary Two Way Team.

== Selection ==
The team was chosen by a panel of 26 voters—coaches, team and front office executives, former players and members of the media—between April and June 2018. New England Patriots head coach Bill Belichick and Pro Football Hall of Fame head coach and former color commentator John Madden, both voters, were in charge of looking over film and issuing a report to the committee on players in the early years of the league. There was a vote to trim the list to 160 in mid-May 2018, after considering the "Golden Era" players recommended by Belichick and Madden. Another debate was held in May with the final votes due on June 15, 2018.

Players were selected at each position group, and were voted in no order. There were 10 quarterbacks, 12 running backs, 10 wide receivers, 5 tight ends, 7 tackles, 7 guards, 4 centers, 7 defensive ends, 7 defensive tackles, 6 outside linebackers, 6 middle/inside linebackers, 7 cornerbacks, 6 safeties, 2 kickers, 2 punters, 2 kick/punt returners, and 10 coaches selected to the team. No long snappers were selected.

The roster was unveiled over six weeks on NFL Network by host Rich Eisen alongside Cris Collinsworth from NBC Sports and Belichick.

== All-Time Team ==
Bold denotes a unanimous selection.

=== Offense ===
Position	Player	Team(s) played for	Accolades
QB	Sammy Baugh	Washington Redskins (1937–1952)	Hall of Fame (1963), NFL 75th Anniversary All-Time Team, NFL 1940s All-Decade Team, 2× NFL champion (1937, 1942), 5× NFL All-Star (1938–1942), (Note: The NFL All-Star Game was a predecessor of the Pro Bowl that was played five times between January 1939 and December 1942. The NFL All-Star Game was played after the NFL Championship Game, with the NFL champion playing against a team consisting of All-Stars from other NFL teams.) 4× First-team All-Pro (1937, 1940, 1942, 1943), Pro Bowler (1951)
QB	**Tom Brady**	New England Patriots (2000–2019); Tampa Bay Buccaneers (2020–2022)	NFL 2000s All-Decade Team, NFL 2010s All-Decade Team, 7× Super Bowl champion (XXXVI, XXXVIII, XXXIX, XLIX, LI, LIII, LV), 5× Super Bowl MVP (XXXVI, XXXVIII, XLIX, LI, LV), 3× AP NFL Most Valuable Player (2007, 2010, 2017), 2× NFL Offensive Player of the Year (2007, 2010), NFL Comeback Player of the Year (2009), 3× First-team All-Pro (2007, 2010, 2017), 15× Pro Bowler (2001, 2004, 2005, 2007, 2009–2018, 2021)
QB	John Elway	Denver Broncos (1983–1998)	Hall of Fame (2004), NFL 1990s All-Decade Team, 2× Super Bowl champion (XXXII, XXXIII), Super Bowl MVP (XXXIII), AP NFL Most Valuable Player (1987), NFL Man of the Year (1992), 9× Pro Bowler (1986, 1987, 1989, 1991, 1993, 1994, 1996–1998)
QB	Brett Favre	Atlanta Falcons (1991); Green Bay Packers (1992–2007); New York Jets (2008); Minnesota Vikings (2009–2010)	Hall of Fame (2016), NFL 1990s All-Decade Team, Super Bowl champion (XXXI), 3× AP NFL Most Valuable Player (1995–1997), 3× First-team All-Pro (1995–1997), 11× Pro Bowler (1992, 1993, 1995–1997, 2001–2003, 2007–2009)
QB	**Otto Graham**	Cleveland Browns (1946–1955) (Note: The Browns competed in the All-America Football Conference from 1946 to 1949.)	Hall of Fame (1965), NFL 75th Anniversary All-Time Team, NFL 1950s All-Decade Team, 3x NFL champion (1950, 1954, 1955), 3x UPI NFL Most Valuable Player (1951, 1953, 1955), 4x First-team All-Pro (1951, 1953–1955), 5× Pro Bowler (1950–1954)
QB	Peyton Manning	Indianapolis Colts (1998–2011); Denver Broncos (2012–2015)	Hall of Fame (2021), NFL 2000s All-Decade Team, 2× Super Bowl champion (XLI, 50), Super Bowl MVP (XLI), 5× AP NFL Most Valuable Player (2003, 2004, 2008, 2009, 2013), 2× NFL Offensive Player of the Year (2004, 2013), NFL Man of the Year (2005), NFL Comeback Player of the Year (2012), 7× First-team All-Pro (2003–2005, 2008, 2009, 2012, 2013), 14× Pro Bowler (1999, 2000, 2002–2010, 2012–2014)
QB	Dan Marino	Miami Dolphins (1983–1999)	Hall of Fame (2005), AP NFL Most Valuable Player (1984), NFL Offensive Player of the Year (1984), NFL Man of the Year (1998), NFL Comeback Player of the Year (1994), 3× First-team All-Pro (1984–1986), 9× Pro Bowler (1983–1987, 1991, 1992, 1994, 1995)
QB	**Joe Montana**	San Francisco 49ers (1979–1992); Kansas City Chiefs (1993–1994)	Hall of Fame (2000), NFL 75th Anniversary All-Time Team, NFL 1980s All-Decade Team, 4× Super Bowl champion (XVI, XIX, XXIII, XXIV), 3× Super Bowl MVP (XVI, XIX, XXIV), 2× AP NFL Most Valuable Player (1989, 1990), NFL Offensive Player of the Year (1989), NFL Comeback Player of the Year (1986), 3× First-team All-Pro (1987, 1989, 1990), 8× Pro Bowler (1981, 1983–1985, 1987, 1989, 1990, 1993)
QB	Roger Staubach	Dallas Cowboys (1969–1979)	Hall of Fame (1985), NFL 1970s All-Decade Team, 2× Super Bowl champion (VI, XII), Super Bowl MVP (VI), NFL Man of the Year (1978), 6× Pro Bowl (1971, 1975–1979)
QB	**Johnny Unitas**	Baltimore Colts (1956–1972); San Diego Chargers (1973)	Hall of Fame (1979), NFL 50th Anniversary All-Time Team, NFL 75th Anniversary All-Time Team, NFL 1960s All-Decade Team, Super Bowl champion (V), 3× NFL champion (1958, 1959, 1968), 3× AP NFL Most Valuable Player (1959, 1964, 1967), NFL Man of the Year (1970), 5× First-team All-Pro (1958, 1959, 1964, 1965, 1967), 10× Pro Bowl (1957–1964, 1966, 1967)
RB	**Jim Brown**	Cleveland Browns (1957–1965)	Hall of Fame (1971), NFL 50th Anniversary All-Time Team, NFL 75th Anniversary All-Time Team, NFL 1960s All-Decade Team, NFL Rookie of the Year (1957), 3× AP NFL Most Valuable Player (1957, 1958, 1965), 8× First-team All-Pro (1957–1961, 1963–1965), 9× Pro Bowler (1957–1965), NFL champion (1964)
RB	Earl Campbell	Houston Oilers (1978–1984); New Orleans Saints (1984–1985)	Hall of Fame (1991), NFL 1970s All-Decade Team, NFL Offensive Rookie of the Year (1978), AP NFL Most Valuable Player (1979), 3× NFL Offensive Player of the Year (1978–1980), 3× First-team All-Pro (1978–1980), 5× Pro Bowler (1978–1981, 1983)
RB	Dutch Clark	Portsmouth Spartans/Detroit Lions (1931–1938)	Hall of Fame (1963), NFL 1930s All-Decade Team, 6× First-team All-Pro (1931, 1932, 1934–1937), NFL champion (1935)
RB	Eric Dickerson	Los Angeles Rams (1983–1987); Indianapolis Colts (1987–1991); Los Angeles Raiders (1992); Atlanta Falcons (1993)	Hall of Fame (1999), NFL 1980s All-Decade Team, NFL Offensive Rookie of the Year (1983), NFL Offensive Player of the Year (1986), 5× First-team All-Pro (1983, 1984, 1986–1988), 6× Pro Bowler (1983, 1984, 1986–1989)
RB	Lenny Moore	Baltimore Colts (1956–1967)	Hall of Fame (1975), NFL 1950s All-Decade Team, NFL Rookie of the Year (1956), NFL Comeback Player of the Year (1964), 5× First-team All-Pro (1958–1961, 1964), 7× Pro Bowler (1956, 1958–1962, 1964), 2× NFL champion (1958, 1959)
RB	Marion Motley	Cleveland Browns (1946–1953); Pittsburgh Steelers (1955)	Hall of Fame (1968), NFL 75th Anniversary All-Time Team, NFL 1940s All-Decade Team, 2× First-team All-Pro (1948, 1950), Pro Bowler (1950), NFL champion (1950)
RB	**Walter Payton**	Chicago Bears (1975–1987)	Hall of Fame (1993), NFL 75th Anniversary All-Time Team, NFL 1970s All-Decade Team, NFL 1980s All-Decade Team, AP NFL Most Valuable Player (1977), NFL Offensive Player of the Year (1977), NFL Man of the Year (1977), 7× First-team All-Pro (1976–1980, 1984, 1985), 9× Pro Bowler (1976–1980, 1983–1986), Super Bowl champion (XX)
RB	Barry Sanders	Detroit Lions (1989–1998)	Hall of Fame (2004), NFL 1990s All-Decade Team, NFL Offensive Rookie of the Year (1989), AP NFL Most Valuable Player (1997), 2× NFL Offensive Player of the Year (1994, 1997), 6× First-team All-Pro (1989–1991, 1994, 1995, 1997), 10× Pro Bowler (1989–1998)
RB	Gale Sayers	Chicago Bears (1965–1971)	Hall of Fame (1977), NFL 50th Anniversary All-Time Team, NFL 75th Anniversary All-Time Team, NFL 1960s All-Decade Team, NFL Rookie of the Year (1965), NFL Comeback Player of the Year (1969), 5× First-team All-Pro (1965–1969), 4× Pro Bowler (1965–1967, 1969)
RB	O. J. Simpson	Buffalo Bills (1969–1977) (Note: The Bills competed in the American Football League from 1960 to 1969.); San Francisco 49ers (1978–1979)	Hall of Fame (1985), NFL 75th Anniversary All-Time Team, NFL 1970s All-Decade Team, AP NFL Most Valuable Player (1973), NFL Offensive Player of the Year (1973), 5× First-team All-Pro (1972–1976), 5× Pro Bowler (1972–1976)
RB	Emmitt Smith	Dallas Cowboys (1990–2002); Arizona Cardinals (2003–2004)	Hall of Fame (2010), NFL 1990s All-Decade Team, NFL Offensive Rookie of the Year (1990), AP NFL Most Valuable Player (1993), 4× First-team All-Pro (1992–1995), 8× Pro Bowler (1990–1995, 1998, 1999), 3× Super Bowl champion (XXVII, XXVIII, XXX), Super Bowl MVP (XXVIII)
RB	Steve Van Buren	Philadelphia Eagles (1944–1951)	Hall of Fame (1965), NFL 75th Anniversary All-Time Team, NFL 1940s All-Decade Team, 6× First-team All-Pro (1944–1949), 2× NFL champion (1948, 1949)
WR	Lance Alworth	San Diego Chargers (1962–1970) (Note: The Chargers competed in the American Football League from 1960 to 1969.); Dallas Cowboys (1971–1972)	Hall of Fame (1978), NFL 75th Anniversary All-Time Team, AFL Player of the Year (1963), Super Bowl champion (VI), AFL champion (1963), 6× First-team All-AFL (1963–1968), 7× AFL All-Star (1963–1969)
WR	**Raymond Berry**	Baltimore Colts (1955–1967)	Hall of Fame (1973), NFL 75th Anniversary All-Time Team, NFL 1950s All-Decade Team, 4× First-team All-Pro (1957–1960), 6× Pro Bowler (1958–1961, 1963, 1964), 2× NFL champion (1958, 1959)
WR	Larry Fitzgerald	Arizona Cardinals (2004–2020)	Hall of Fame (2026), NFL 2010s All-Decade Team, NFL Man of the Year (2016), First-team All-Pro (2008), 11× Pro Bowler (2005, 2007–2013, 2015–2017)
WR	Marvin Harrison	Indianapolis Colts (1996–2008)	Hall of Fame (2016), NFL 2000s All-Decade Team, 3× First-team All-Pro (1999, 2002, 2006), 8× Pro Bowler (1999–2006), Super Bowl champion (XLI)
WR	Elroy Hirsch	Chicago Rockets (1946–1948) (Note: The Rockets competed in the All-America Football Conference from 1946 to 1949.); Los Angeles Rams (1949–1957)	Hall of Fame (1968), NFL 50th Anniversary All-Time Team, NFL 1950s All-Decade Team, 2× First-team All-Pro (1951, 1953), 3× Pro Bowler (1951–1953), NFL champion (1951)
WR	**Don Hutson**	Green Bay Packers (1935–1945)	Hall of Fame (1963), NFL 50th Anniversary All-Time Team, NFL 75th Anniversary All-Time Team, NFL 1930s All-Decade Team, 2× NFL Most Valuable Player (1941, 1942), 8× First-team All-Pro (1938–1945), 4× NFL All-Star (1939–1942), 3× NFL champion (1936, 1939, 1944)
WR	Steve Largent	Seattle Seahawks (1976–1989)	Hall of Fame (1995), NFL 1980s All-Decade Team, NFL Man of the Year (1988), First-team All-Pro (1985), 7× Pro Bowler (1978, 1979, 1981, 1984–1987)
WR	Randy Moss	Minnesota Vikings (1998–2004, 2010); Oakland Raiders (2005–2006); New England Patriots (2007–2010); Tennessee Titans (2010); San Francisco 49ers (2012)	Hall of Fame (2018), NFL 2000s All-Decade Team, NFL Offensive Rookie of the Year (1998), NFL Comeback Player of the Year (2007), 4× First-team All-Pro (1998, 2000, 2003, 2007), 6× Pro Bowler (1998–2000, 2002, 2003, 2007)
WR	**Jerry Rice**	San Francisco 49ers (1985–2000); Oakland Raiders (2001–2004); Seattle Seahawks (2004)	Hall of Fame (2010), NFL 75th Anniversary All-Time Team, NFL 1980s All-Decade Team, NFL 1990s All-Decade Team, 2× NFL Offensive Player of the Year (1987, 1993), 10× First-team All-Pro (1986–1990, 1992–1996), 13× Pro Bowler (1986–1996, 1998, 2002), 3× Super Bowl champion (XXIII, XXIV, XXIX), Super Bowl MVP (XXIII)
WR	Paul Warfield	Cleveland Browns (1964–1969, 1976–1977); Miami Dolphins (1970–1974)	Hall of Fame (1983), NFL 1970s All-Decade Team, 6× First-team All-Pro (1964, 1968, 1969, 1971–1973), 8× Pro Bowler (1964, 1968–1974), 2× Super Bowl champion (VII, VIII), NFL champion (1964)
TE	Mike Ditka	Chicago Bears (1961–1966); Philadelphia Eagles (1967–1968); Dallas Cowboys (1969–1972)	Hall of Fame (1988), NFL Rookie of the Year (1961), 2× First-team All-Pro (1963–1964), 5× Pro Bowler (1961–1965), NFL champion (1963), Super Bowl champion (VI)
TE	Tony Gonzalez	Kansas City Chiefs (1997–2008); Atlanta Falcons (2009–2013)	Hall of Fame (2019), NFL 2000s All-Decade Team, 6× First-team All-Pro (1999–2001, 2003, 2008, 2012), 14× Pro Bowler (1999–2008, 2010–2013)
TE	Rob Gronkowski	New England Patriots (2010–2018); Tampa Bay Buccaneers (2020–2021)	NFL 2010s All-Decade Team, NFL Comeback Player of the Year (2014), 4× First-team All-Pro (2011, 2014, 2015, 2017), 5× Pro Bowler (2011, 2012, 2014, 2015, 2017), 4× Super Bowl champion (XLIX, LI, LIII, LV)
TE	**John Mackey**	Baltimore Colts (1963–1971); San Diego Chargers (1972)	Hall of Fame (1992), NFL 50th Anniversary All-Time Team, NFL 1960s All-Decade Team, 3× First-team All-Pro (1966–1968), 4× Pro Bowler (1963, 1966–1968), NFL champion (1968), Super Bowl champion (V)
TE	Kellen Winslow	San Diego Chargers (1979–1987)	Hall of Fame (1995), NFL 1980s All-Decade Team, 3× First-team All-Pro (1980–1982), 5× Pro Bowler (1980–1983, 1987)
OT	Rosey Brown	New York Giants (1953–1965)	Hall of Fame (1974), NFL 75th Anniversary All-Time Team, NFL 1950s All-Decade Team, 6× First-team All-Pro (1956–1959, 1961, 1962), 9× Pro Bowler (1955–1960, 1962, 1964, 1965), NFL champion (1956)
OT	Forrest Gregg	Green Bay Packers (1956, 1958–1970); Dallas Cowboys (1971)	Hall of Fame (1977), NFL 75th Anniversary All-Time Team, NFL 1960s All-Decade Team, 7× First-team All-Pro (1960, 1962–1967), 9× Pro Bowler (1959–1964, 1966–1968), 5× NFL champion (1961, 1962, 1965–1967), 3× Super Bowl champion (I, II, VI)
OT	Cal Hubbard	New York Giants (1927–1928, 1936); Green Bay Packers (1929–1933, 1935); Pittsburgh Pirates (1936)	Hall of Fame (1963), NFL 50th Anniversary All-Time Team, NFL 75th Anniversary All-Time Team, NFL 1920s All-Decade Team, 4× First-team All-Pro (1927, 1931–1933), 4× NFL champion (1927, 1929–1931)
OT	Walter Jones	Seattle Seahawks (1997–2009)	Hall of Fame (2014), NFL 2000s All-Decade Team, 4× First-team All-Pro (2001, 2004, 2005, 2007), 9× Pro Bowler (1999, 2001–2008)
OT	**Anthony Muñoz**	Cincinnati Bengals (1980–1992)	Hall of Fame (1998), NFL 75th Anniversary All-Time Team, NFL 1980s All-Decade Team, NFL Man of the Year (1991), 9× All-Pro (1981–1983, 1985–1990), 11× Pro Bowler (1981–1991)
OT	Jonathan Ogden	Baltimore Ravens (1996–2007)	Hall of Fame (2013), NFL 2000s All-Decade Team, 4× First-team All-Pro (1997, 2000, 2002, 2003), 11× Pro Bowler (1997–2007), Super Bowl champion (XXXV)
OT	Art Shell	Oakland/Los Angeles Raiders (1968–1982) (Note: The Raiders competed in the American Football League from 1960 to 1969.)	Hall of Fame (1989), NFL 1970s All-Decade Team, 2× First-Team All-Pro (1974, 1977), 8× Pro Bowler (1972–1978, 1980), 2× Super Bowl champion (XI, XV)
OG	Larry Allen	Dallas Cowboys (1994–2005); San Francisco 49ers (2006–2007)	Hall of Fame (2013), NFL 1990s All-Decade Team, NFL 2000s All-Decade Team, 7× First-team All-Pro (1995–2001), 11× Pro Bowler (1995–2001, 2003–2006), Super Bowl champion (XXX)
OG	Dan Fortmann	Chicago Bears (1936–1943)	Hall of Fame (1965), NFL 1930s All-Decade Team, 7× First-team All-Pro (1937–1943), 3× NFL All-Star (1940–1942), 3× NFL champion (1940, 1941, 1943)
OG	John Hannah	New England Patriots (1973–1985)	Hall of Fame (1991), NFL 75th Anniversary All-Time Team, NFL 1970s All-Decade Team, NFL 1980s All-Decade Team, 10× First-team All-Pro (1976–1985), 9× Pro Bowler (1976, 1978–1985)
OG	Bruce Matthews	Houston/Tennessee Oilers/Titans (1983–2001)	Hall of Fame (2007), NFL 1990s All-Decade Team, 9× First-team All-Pro (1988–1993, 1998–2000), 14× Pro Bowler (1988–2001)
OG	Randall McDaniel	Minnesota Vikings (1988–1999); Tampa Bay Buccaneers (2000–2001)	Hall of Fame (2009), NFL 1990s All-Decade Team, 9× First-team All-Pro (1990–1998), 12× Pro Bowler (1989–2000)
OG	**Jim Parker**	Baltimore Colts (1957–1967)	Hall of Fame (1973), NFL 75th Anniversary All-Time Team, NFL 1950s All-Decade Team, 9× First-team All-Pro (1957–1965), 8x Po Bowler (1958–1965), 2× NFL champion (1958, 1959)
OG	Gene Upshaw	Oakland Raiders (1967–1981)	Hall of Fame (1987), NFL 1970s All-Decade Team, 3× First-team All-Pro (1970, 1974, 1977), 2× First-team All-AFL (1968, 1969), 6× Pro Bowler (1972–1977), AFL All-Star (1968), 2× Super Bowl champion (XI, XV)
C	Mel Hein	New York Giants (1931–1945)	Hall of Fame (1963), NFL 75th Anniversary All-Time Team, NFL 1930s All-Decade Team, NFL Most Valuable Player (1938), 8× First-team All-Pro (1933–1940), 4× NFL All-Star (1938–1941), 2× NFL champion (1934, 1938)
C	Jim Otto	Oakland Raiders (1960–1974)	Hall of Fame (1980), AFL All-Time Team, 2× First-team All-Pro (1970, 1971), 10× First-team All-AFL (1960–1969), 3× Pro Bowler (1970–1972), 9× AFL All-Star (1961–1969)
C	Dwight Stephenson	Miami Dolphins (1980–1987)	Hall of Fame (1998), NFL 1980s All-Decade Team, NFL Man of the Year (1985), 5× First-team All-Pro (1983–1987), 5× Pro Bowler (1983–1987)
C	Mike Webster	Pittsburgh Steelers (1974–1988); Kansas City Chiefs (1989–1990)	Hall of Fame (1997), NFL 75th Anniversary All-Time Team, NFL 1970s All-Decade Team, NFL 1980s All-Decade Team, 7× First-team All-Pro (1978–1984), 9× Pro Bowler (1978–1985, 1987), 4× Super Bowl champion (IX, X, XIII, XIV)

=== Defense ===
Position	Player	Team(s) played for	Accolades
DE	Doug Atkins	Cleveland Browns (1953–1954); Chicago Bears (1955–1966); New Orleans Saints (1967–1969)	Hall of Fame (1982), NFL 1960s All-Decade Team, 4× First-team All-Pro (1958, 1960, 1961, 1963), 8× Pro Bowler (1957–1963, 1965), 2× NFL champion (1954, 1963)
DE	Bill Hewitt	Chicago Bears (1932–1936); Philadelphia Eagles (1937–1939); Steagles (1943)	Hall of Fame (1971), NFL 1930s All-Decade Team, 6× First-team All-Pro (1932–1934, 1936–1938), 2× NFL champion (1932, 1933)
DE	**Deacon Jones**	Los Angeles Rams (1961–1971); San Diego Chargers (1972–1973); Washington Redskins (1974)	Hall of Fame (1980), NFL 75th Anniversary All-Time Team, NFL 1960s All-Decade Team, 2× NFL Defensive Player of the Year (1967, 1968), 5x First-team All-Pro (1965–1969), 8× Pro Bowler (1964–1970, 1972)
DE	**Gino Marchetti**	Dallas Texans (1952); Baltimore Colts (1953–1964, 1966)	Hall of Fame (1972), NFL 50th Anniversary All-Time Team, NFL 75th Anniversary All-Time Team, NFL 1950s All-Decade Team, 9× First-team All-Pro (1956–1964), 11× Pro Bowler (1954–1964), 2× NFL champion (1958, 1959)
DE	Lee Roy Selmon	Tampa Bay Buccaneers (1976–1984)	Hall of Fame (1995), NFL 1980s All-Decade Team, 1979 NFL Defensive Player of the Year, 3x First-team All-Pro (1979, 1980, 1982), 6× Pro Bowler (1979–1984)
DE	Bruce Smith	Buffalo Bills (1985–1999); Washington Redskins (2000–2003)	Hall of Fame (2009), NFL 1990s All-Decade Team, 2× NFL Defensive Player of the Year (1990, 1996), 8× First-team All-Pro (1987, 1988, 1990, 1993–1997), 11× Pro Bowler (1987–1990, 1992–1998)
DE	Reggie White	Philadelphia Eagles (1985–1992); Green Bay Packers (1993–1998); Carolina Panthers (2000)	Hall of Fame (2006), NFL 75th Anniversary All-Time Team, NFL 1980s All-Decade Team, NFL 1990s All-Decade Team, 2× NFL Defensive Player of the Year (1987, 1998), 8× First-team All-Pro (1986–1991, 1995, 1998), 13× Pro Bowler (1986–1998), Super Bowl champion (XXXI)
DT	Buck Buchanan	Kansas City Chiefs (1963–1975) (Note: The Chiefs competed in the American Football League from 1960 to 1969.)	Hall of Fame (1990), American Football League All-Time Team, 6× First-team All-AFL (1964–1969), 2× Pro Bowler (1970, 1971), 6× AFL All-Star (1964–1969), Super Bowl champion (IV)
DT	Joe Greene	Pittsburgh Steelers (1969–1981)	Hall of Fame (1987), NFL 75th Anniversary All-Time Team, NFL 1970s All-Decade Team, NFL Defensive Rookie of the Year (1969), 2× NFL Defensive Player of the Year (1972, 1974), NFL Man of the Year (1979), 5× First-team All-Pro (1972–1974, 1977, 1979), 10× Pro Bowler (1969–1976, 1978, 1979), 4× Super Bowl champion (IX, X, XIII, XIV)
DT	**Bob Lilly**	Dallas Cowboys (1961–1974)	Hall of Fame (1980), NFL 75th Anniversary All-Time Team, NFL 1960s All-Decade Team, NFL 1970s All-Decade Team, 7× First-team All-Pro (1964–1969, 1971), 11× Pro Bowler (1962, 1964–1973), Super Bowl champion (VI)
DT	Merlin Olsen	Los Angeles Rams (1962–1976)	Hall of Fame (1982), NFL 75th Anniversary All-Time Team, NFL 1960s All-Decade Team, NFL 1970s All-Decade Team, NFL Rookie of the Year (1962), 5× First-team All-Pro (1966–1970), 14× Pro Bowler (1962–1975)
DT	**Alan Page**	Minnesota Vikings (1967–1978); Chicago Bears (1978–1981)	Hall of Fame (1988), NFL 1970s All-Decade Team, AP NFL Most Valuable Player (1971), 2× NFL Defensive Player of the Year (1971, 1973), 6× First-team All-Pro (1969–1971, 1973–1975), 9× Pro Bowler (1968–1976)
DT	John Randle	Minnesota Vikings (1990–2000); Seattle Seahawks (2000–2003)	Hall of Fame (2010), NFL 1990s All-Decade Team, 6× First-team All-Pro (1993–1998), 7× Pro Bowler (1993–1998, 2001)
DT	Randy White	Dallas Cowboys (1975–1988)	Hall of Fame (1994), NFL 1980s All-Decade Team, 9× First-team All-Pro (1977–1985), 9× Pro Bowler (1977–1985), Super Bowl champion (XII), Super Bowl MVP (XII)
OLB	Chuck Bednarik	Philadelphia Eagles (1949–1962)	Hall of Fame (1967), NFL 75th Anniversary All-Time Team, NFL 50th Anniversary All-Time Team, NFL 1950s All-Decade Team, 10× First-team All-Pro (1950–1957, 1960, 1961), 8× Pro Bowler (1950–1954, 1956, 1957, 1960), 2× NFL champion (1949, 1960)
OLB	Bobby Bell	Kansas City Chiefs (1963–1974)	Hall of Fame (1983), NFL 1970s All-Decade Team, AFL All-Time Team, NFL Defensive Player of the Year (1969), First-team All-Pro (1970), 5× First-team All-AFL (1965–1969), 3× Pro Bowler (1970–1972), 6× AFL All-Star (1964–1969), Super Bowl champion (IV)
OLB	Derrick Brooks	Tampa Bay Buccaneers (1995–2008)	Hall of Fame (2014), NFL 2000s All-Decade Team, NFL Man of the Year (2000), NFL Defensive Player of the Year (2002), 5× First-team All-Pro (1999, 2000, 2002, 2004, 2005), 11× Pro Bowler (1997–2006, 2008), Super Bowl champion (XXXVII)
OLB	Jack Ham	Pittsburgh Steelers (1971–1982)	Hall of Fame (1988), NFL 75th Anniversary All-Time Team, NFL 1970s All-Decade Team, NFL Defensive Player of the Year (1975), 6× First-team All-Pro (1974–1979), 8× Pro Bowler (1973–1980), 4× Super Bowl champion (IX, X, XIII, XIV)
OLB	Ted Hendricks	Baltimore Colts (1969–1973); Green Bay Packers (1974); Oakland/Los Angeles Raiders (1975–1983)	Hall of Fame (1990), NFL 75th Anniversary All-Time Team, NFL 1970s All-Decade Team, NFL 1980s All-Decade Team, 4× First-team All-Pro (1971, 1974, 1980, 1982), 8× Pro Bowler (1971–1974, 1980–1983), 4× Super Bowl champion (V, XI, XV, XVIII)
OLB	**Lawrence Taylor**	New York Giants (1981–1993)	Hall of Fame (1999), NFL 75th Anniversary All-Time Team, NFL 1980s All-Decade Team, NFL Defensive Rookie of the Year (1981), AP NFL Most Valuable Player (1986), 3× NFL Defensive Player of the Year (1981, 1982, 1986), 10× First-team All-Pro (1981–1989), (Note: In 1983, Taylor was named an All-Pro outside linebacker by the AP, the NEA, the PFWA and Pro Football Weekly, and an All-Pro inside linebacker by The Sporting News.) 10× Pro Bowler (1981–1990), 2× Super Bowl champion (XXI, XXV)
MLB	**Dick Butkus**	Chicago Bears (1965–1973)	Hall of Fame (1979), NFL 75th Anniversary All-Time Team, NFL 1960s All-Decade Team, NFL 1970s All-Decade Team, 2× NFL Defensive Player of the Year (1969, 1970), 6× First-team All-Pro (1965, 1967–1970, 1972), 8× Pro Bowler (1965–1972)
MLB	Jack Lambert	Pittsburgh Steelers (1974–1984)	Hall of Fame (1990), NFL 75th Anniversary All-Time Team, NFL 1970s All-Decade Team, NFL 1980s All-Decade Team, NFL Defensive Rookie of the Year (1974), NFL Defensive Player of the Year (1976), 6× First-team All-Pro (1976, 1979–1983), 9× Pro Bowler (1975–1983), 4× Super Bowl champion (IX, X, XIII, XIV)
MLB	Willie Lanier	Kansas City Chiefs (1967–1977)	Hall of Fame (1986), NFL 75th Anniversary All-Time Team, NFL Man of the Year (1972), 8× First-team All-Pro (1968–1975), 2× All-AFL (1968, 1969), 6× Pro Bowler (1970–1975), 2× AFL All-Star (1968, 1969), Super Bowl champion (IV)
MLB	Ray Lewis	Baltimore Ravens (1996–2012)	Hall of Fame (2018), NFL 2000s All-Decade Team, 2x NFL Defensive Player of Year (2000, 2003), 7× First-team All-Pro (1999–2001, 2003, 2004, 2008, 2009), 13× Pro Bowler (1997–2001, 2003, 2004, 2006–2011), 2× Super Bowl champion (XXXV, XLVII), Super Bowl MVP (XXXV)
MLB	Joe Schmidt	Detroit Lions (1953–1965)	Hall of Fame (1973), NFL 1950s All-Decade Team, 8× First-team All-Pro (1954–1959, 1961, 1962), 10× Pro Bowler (1954–1963), 2× NFL champion (1953, 1957)
MLB	Junior Seau	San Diego Chargers (1990–2002); Miami Dolphins (2003–2005); New England Patriots (2006–2009)	Hall of Fame (2015), NFL 1990s All-Decade Team, NFL Defensive Player of the Year (1992), NFL Man of the Year (1994), 8× First-team All-Pro (1991–1996, 1998, 2000), 12× Pro Bowler (1991–2002)
CB	**Mel Blount**	Pittsburgh Steelers (1970–1983)	Hall of Fame (1989), NFL 75th Anniversary All-Time Team, NFL 1980s All-Decade Team, NFL Defensive Player of the Year (1975), 2× First-team All-Pro (1975, 1981), 5× Pro Bowler (1975, 1976, 1978, 1979, 1981), 4× Super Bowl champion (IX, X, XIII, XIV)
CB	Willie Brown	Denver Broncos (1963–1966) (Note: The Broncos competed in the American Football League from 1960 to 1969.); Oakland Raiders (1967–1978)	Hall of Fame (1984), NFL 1970s All-Decade Team, AFL All-Time Team, 2× First-team All-Pro (1971, 1973), 3× First-team All-AFL (1964, 1968, 1969), 4× Pro Bowler (1970–1973), 5× AFL All-Star (1964, 1965, 1967–1969), 3× Super Bowl champion (XI, XV, XVIII)
CB	Darrell Green	Washington Redskins (1983–2002)	Hall of Fame (2008), NFL 1990s All-Decade Team, NFL Man of the Year (1996), 4× First-team All-Pro (1986, 1987, 1990, 1991), 7× Pro Bowler (1984, 1986, 1987, 1990, 1991, 1996, 1997), 2× Super Bowl Champion (XXII, XXVI)
CB	**Mike Haynes**	New England Patriots (1976–1982); Los Angeles Raiders (1983–1989)	Hall of Fame (1997), NFL 75th Anniversary All-Time Team, NFL 1980s All-Decade Team, NFL Defensive Rookie of the Year (1976), 2× First-team All-Pro (1984, 1985), 9× Pro Bowler (1976–1980, 1982, 1984–1986), Super Bowl champion (XVIII)
CB	**Dick "Night Train" Lane**	Los Angeles Rams (1952–1953); Chicago Cardinals (1954–1959); Detroit Lions (1960–1965)	Hall of Fame (1974), NFL 50th Anniversary All-Time Team, NFL 75th Anniversary All-Time Team, NFL 1950s All-Decade Team, 7× First-team All-Pro (1956, 1957, 1959–1963), 7× Pro Bowler (1954–1956, 1958, 1960–1962)
CB	Deion Sanders	Atlanta Falcons (1989–1993); San Francisco 49ers (1994); Dallas Cowboys (1995–1999); Washington Redskins (2000); Baltimore Ravens (2004–2005)	Hall of Fame (2011), NFL 1990s All-Decade Team, NFL Defensive Player of the Year (1994), 9× First-team All-Pro (1991–1999), 8× Pro Bowler (1991–1994, 1996–1999), 2× Super Bowl champion (XXIX, XXX)
CB	Rod Woodson	Pittsburgh Steelers (1987–1996); San Francisco 49ers (1997); Baltimore Ravens (1998–2001); Oakland Raiders (2002–2003)	Hall of Fame (2009), NFL 75th Anniversary All-Time Team, NFL 1990s All-Decade Team, NFL Defensive Player of the Year (1993), 6× First-team All-Pro (1989, 1990, 1992–1994, 2002), 11× Pro Bowler (1989–1994, 1996, 1999–2002), Super Bowl champion (XXXV)
S	Jack Christiansen	Detroit Lions (1951–1958)	Hall of Fame (1970), NFL 1950s All-Decade Team, 6× First-team All-Pro (1952–1957), 5× Pro Bowler (1953–1957), 3× NFL champion (1952, 1953, 1957)
S	Ken Houston	Houston Oilers (1967–1972) (Note: The Oilers competed in the American Football League from 1960 to 1969.); Washington Redskins (1973–1980)	Hall of Fame (1986), NFL 75th Anniversary All-Time Team, NFL 1970s All-Decade Team, 2× First-team All-Pro (1975, 1978), 12× Pro Bowler (1968–1979)
S	**Ronnie Lott**	San Francisco 49ers (1981–1990); Los Angeles Raiders (1991–1992); New York Jets (1993–1994)	Hall of Fame (2000), NFL 75th Anniversary All-Time Team, NFL 1980s All-Decade Team, 8× First-team All-Pro (1981, 1983, 1986–1991), 10× Pro Bowler (1981–1984, 1986–1991), 4× Super Bowl champion (XVI, XIX, XXIII, XXIV)
S	Ed Reed	Baltimore Ravens (2002–2012); Houston Texans (2013); New York Jets (2013)	Hall of Fame (2019), NFL 2000s All-Decade Team, NFL Defensive Player of the Year (2004), 5× First-team All-Pro (2004, 2006–2008, 2010), 9× Pro Bowler (2003, 2004, 2006–2012), Super Bowl champion (XLVII)
S	Emlen Tunnell	New York Giants (1948–1958); Green Bay Packers (1959–1961)	Hall of Fame (1967), NFL 50th Anniversary All-Time Team, NFL 1950s All-Decade Team, 6× First-team All-Pro (1949, 1951, 1952, 1954–1956), 9× Pro Bowler (1950–1957, 1959), 2× NFL champion (1956, 1961)
S	Larry Wilson	St. Louis Cardinals (1960–1972)	Hall of Fame (1978), NFL 75th Anniversary All-Time Team, NFL 1960s All-Decade Team, NFL 1970s All-Decade Team, NFL Defensive Player of the Year (1966), 6× First-team All-Pro (1963, 1966–1970), 8× Pro Bowler (1962, 1963, 1965–1970)

=== Special teams ===
Position	Player	Team(s) played for	Accolades
K	Jan Stenerud	Kansas City Chiefs (1967–1979); Green Bay Packers (1980–1983); Minnesota Vikings (1984–1985)	Hall of Fame (1991), NFL 75th Anniversary All-Time Team, 4× First-team All-Pro (1970, 1971, 1974, 1984), 2× First-team All-AFL (1968–1969), 4× Pro Bowler (1970, 1971, 1975, 1984), 2× AFL All-Star (1968, 1969), Super Bowl champion (IV)
K	Adam Vinatieri	New England Patriots (1996–2005); Indianapolis Colts (2006–2019)	Hall of Fame (2026), NFL 2000s All-Decade Team, 3× First-team All-Pro (2002, 2004, 2014), 3× Pro Bowler (2002, 2004, 2014), 4× Super Bowl champion (XXXVI, XXXVIII, XXXIX, XLI)
P	Ray Guy	Oakland/Los Angeles Raiders (1973–1986)	Hall of Fame (2014), NFL 75th Anniversary All-Time Team, NFL 1970s All-Decade Team, 6× First-team All-Pro (1973–1978), 7× Pro Bowler (1973–1978, 1980), 3× Super Bowl champion (XI, XV, XVIII)
P	Shane Lechler	Oakland Raiders (2000–2012); Houston Texans (2013–2017)	NFL 2000s All-Decade Team, NFL 2010s All-Decade Team, 6× First-team All-Pro (2000, 2003, 2004, 2008–2010), 7× Pro Bowler (2001, 2004, 2007–2011)
KR	Devin Hester	Chicago Bears (2006–2013); Atlanta Falcons (2014–2015); Baltimore Ravens (2016); Seattle Seahawks (2016)	Hall of Fame (2024), NFL 2000s All-Decade Team, NFL 2010s All-Decade Team, 3x NFL Alumni Special Teams Player of the Year (2006–2007, 2010), 3× First-team All-Pro (2006, 2007, 2010), 4× Pro Bowler (2006, 2007, 2010, 2014)
PR	Billy "White Shoes" Johnson	Houston Oilers (1974–1980); Atlanta Falcons (1982–1987); Washington Redskins (1988)	NFL 75th Anniversary All-Time Team, NFL 1970s All-Decade Team, NFL 1980s All-Decade Team, NFL Comeback Player of the Year (1983), 3× First-team All-Pro (1975, 1977, 1983), 3× Pro Bowler (1975, 1977, 1983)

=== Head coaches ===
Coach	Team(s) coached	Accolades
Bill Belichick	Cleveland Browns (1991–1995); New England Patriots (2000–2023)	NFL 2000s All-Decade Team, NFL 2010s All-Decade Team, 3× AP NFL Coach of the Year (2003, 2007, 2010), 2× Pro Football Weekly NFL Coach of the Year (2003, 2007), 2× Sporting News NFL Coach of the Year (2003, 2007), Maxwell Club NFL Coach of the Year (2007), 6× Super Bowl champion (XXXVI, XXXVIII, XXXIX, XLIX, LI, LIII)
Paul Brown	Cleveland Browns (1946–1962); Cincinnati Bengals (1968–1975) (Note: The Bengals competed in the American Football League from 1968 to 1969.)	Hall of Fame (1967), 3× Sporting News Coach of the Year (1949, 1951, 1953), 3× UPI Coach of the Year (1957, 1969, 1970), AP NFL Coach of the Year (1970), 4× AAFC champion (1946–1949), 3× NFL champion (1950, 1954, 1955)
Joe Gibbs	Washington Redskins (1981–1992, 2004–2007)	Hall of Fame (1996), 3× Sporting News NFL Coach of the Year (1982, 1983, 1991), 2× AP NFL Coach of the Year (1982, 1983), 2× Pro Football Weekly NFL Coach of the Year (1982, 1983), UPI NFC Coach of the Year (1982), 3× Super Bowl champion (XVII, XXII, XXVI)
George Halas	Decatur Staleys / Chicago Staleys / Chicago Bears (1920–1929, 1933–1942, 1946–1955, 1958–1967)	Hall of Fame (1963), 2× AP NFL Coach of the Year (1963, 1965), 2× Sporting News NFL Coach of the Year (1963, 1965), 2× UPI NFL Coach of the Year (1963, 1965), 6× NFL champion (1921, 1933, 1940, 1941, 1946, 1963)
Curly Lambeau	Green Bay Packers (1919–1949) (Note: The Packers did not join the National Football League until 1921.); Chicago Cardinals (1950–1951); Washington Redskins (1952–1953)	Hall of Fame (1963), 6× NFL champion (1929–1931, 1936, 1939, 1944)
Tom Landry	Dallas Cowboys (1960–1988)	Hall of Fame (1990), 2× UPI NFL Coach of the Year (1966, 1975), AP NFL Coach of the Year (1966), Sporting News NFL Coach of the Year (1966), 2× Super Bowl champion (VI, XII)
Vince Lombardi	Green Bay Packers (1959–1967); Washington Redskins (1969)	Hall of Fame (1971), AP NFL Coach of the Year (1959), Sporting News NFL Coach of the Year (1961), UPI NFL Coach of the Year (1959), 5× NFL champion (1961, 1962, 1965–1967), 2× Super Bowl champion (I, II)
Chuck Noll	Pittsburgh Steelers (1969–1991)	Hall of Fame (1993), NFL 1970s All-Decade Team, NFL 1980s All-Decade Team, Maxwell Club NFL Coach of the Year (1989), UPI AFC Coach of the Year (1972), 4× Super Bowl champion (IX, X, XIII, XIV)
Don Shula	Baltimore Colts (1963–1969); Miami Dolphins (1970–1995)	Hall of Fame (1997), NFL 1970s All-Decade Team, 4× AP NFL Coach of the Year (1964, 1967, 1968, 1972), 4× Sporting News NFL Coach of the Year (1964, 1968, 1970, 1972), 3× Pro Football Weekly Coach of the Year (1968, 1970, 1972), 3× UPI Coach of the Year (1964, 1968, 1971), NFL champion (1968), 2× Super Bowl champion (VII, VIII)
Bill Walsh	San Francisco 49ers (1979–1988)	Hall of Fame (1993), NFL 1980s All-Decade Team, 2× UPI NFC Coach of the Year (1981, 1984), AP NFL Coach of the Year (1981), Pro Football Weekly NFL Coach of the Year (1981), Sporting News NFL Coach of the Year (1981), 3× Super Bowl champion (XVI, XIX, XXIII)

== Finalists ==
=== Quarterbacks ===
On December 21 and December 22, 2019, quarterbacks Joe Montana and Tom Brady were announced as the first two quarterbacks to make it to the 100th Anniversary All-Time Team. On December 23, 2019, the remaining 20 finalists for the 100th Anniversary All-Time Team were announced. They included Troy Aikman, Sammy Baugh, Terry Bradshaw, Drew Brees, John Elway, Brett Favre, Dan Fouts, Otto Graham, Bobby Layne, Sid Luckman, Peyton Manning, Dan Marino, Joe Namath, Aaron Rodgers, Bart Starr, Roger Staubach, Fran Tarkenton, Johnny Unitas, Norm Van Brocklin, and Steve Young.

=== Running backs ===
On November 18, 2019, 24 running back finalists were announced. The finalists included Marcus Allen, Jerome Bettis, Jim Brown, Earl Campbell, Earl "Dutch" Clark, Eric Dickerson, Tony Dorsett, Marshall Faulk, Harold "Red" Grange, Franco Harris, Hugh McElhenny, Lenny Moore, Marion Motley, Bronko Nagurski, Walter Payton, Adrian Peterson, Barry Sanders, Gale Sayers, O. J. Simpson, Emmitt Smith, Jim Taylor, Thurman Thomas, LaDainian Tomlinson, and Steve Van Buren.

=== Wide receivers ===
On December 16, 2019, 24 wide receivers were announced as finalists for the 100th Anniversary All-Time Team. They included Lance Alworth, Raymond Berry, Fred Biletnikoff, Cris Carter, Tom Fears, Larry Fitzgerald, Marvin Harrison, Bob Hayes, Elroy "Crazylegs" Hirsch, Don Hutson, Michael Irvin, Calvin Johnson, Charlie Joiner, Steve Largent, Dante Lavelli, James Lofton, Don Maynard, Randy Moss, Terrell Owens, Pete Pihos, Jerry Rice, John Stallworth, Charley Taylor, and Paul Warfield.

=== Tight ends ===
On December 9, 2019, 12 tight end finalists were announced, including Dave Casper, Mike Ditka, Antonio Gates, Tony Gonzalez, Rob Gronkowski, Ron Kramer, John Mackey, Ozzie Newsome, Charlie Sanders, Shannon Sharpe, Kellen Winslow, and Jason Witten.

=== Offensive linemen ===
On December 9, 2019, 40 offensive linemen were announced as finalists. Sixteen of the 40 finalists were tackles, including Bob "The Boomer" Brown, Roosevelt "Rosey" Brown, Lou Creekmur, Dan Dierdorf, Forrest Gregg, Cal Hubbard, Walter Jones, Ron Mix, Anthony Muñoz, Jonathan Ogden, Orlando Pace, Willie Roaf, Art Shell, Bob St. Clair, Joe Thomas, and Ron Yary. Fifteen of the 40 finalists were guards, including Larry Allen, Joe DeLamielleure, Dan Fortmann, John Hannah, Jerry Kramer, Larry Little, Tom Mack, Bruce Matthews, Randall McDaniel, Mike Michalske, Mike Munchak, Jim Parker, Will Shields, Dick Stanfel, and Gene Upshaw. Nine of the 40 finalists were centers, including Dermontti Dawson, Mel Hein, Jim Langer, Jim Otto, Jim Ringo, Dwight Stephenson, Mick Tingelhoff, Clyde "Bulldog" Turner and Mike Webster.

=== Defensive linemen ===
On November 25, 2019, 33 defensive linemen were announced as finalists. Seventeen of the 33 defensive linemen were defensive ends, including Doug Atkins, Willie Davis, Carl Eller, Len Ford, Bill Hewitt, Deacon Jones, Howie Long, Gino Marchetti, Julius Peppers, Andy Robustelli, Lee Roy Selmon, Bruce Smith, Michael Strahan, DeMarcus Ware, J. J. Watt, Reggie White, and Jack Youngblood. Sixteen of the 33 defensive linemen were defensive tackles, including Junious "Buck" Buchanan, Curley Culp, Art Donovan, "Mean" Joe Greene, Cortez Kennedy, Bob Lilly, Gene "Big Daddy" Lipscomb, Leo Nomellini, Merlin Olsen, Alan Page, John Randle, Warren Sapp, Tom Sestak, Ernie Stautner, Randy White, and Bill Willis.

=== Linebackers ===
On November 25, 2019, 25 linebacker finalists were announced. The finalists included Chuck Bednarik, Bobby Bell, Derrick Brooks, Dick Butkus, Harry Carson, Bill George, Kevin Greene, Jack Ham, Ted Hendricks, Clarke Hinkle, Sam Huff, Luke Kuechly, Jack Lambert, Willie Lanier, Ray Lewis, Von Miller, Ray Nitschke, Dave Robinson, Joe Schmidt, Junior Seau, Mike Singletary, Lawrence Taylor, Derrick Thomas, Brian Urlacher, and Dave Wilcox.

=== Defensive backs ===
On December 2, 2019, 30 defensive back finalists were announced. Sixteen of the 30 defensive back finalists were cornerbacks, including Herb Adderley, Champ Bailey, Lem Barney, Mel Blount, Willie Brown, Darrell Green, Mike Haynes, Jimmy Johnson, Dick "Night Train" Lane, Patrick Peterson, Mel Renfro, Darrelle Revis, Deion Sanders, Aeneas Williams, Charles Woodson, and Rod Woodson. Fourteen of the 30 defensive back finalists were safeties, including Jack Christiansen, Brian Dawkins, Kenny Easley, Ken Houston, Paul Krause, Yale Lary, Ronnie Lott, Troy Polamalu, Ed Reed, Johnny Robinson, Donnie Shell, Emlen Tunnell, Larry Wilson, and Willie Wood.

=== Special teamers ===
On December 2, 2019, 12 special teams finalists were announced. Four of the 12 special team finalists were kickers, including Morten Andersen, Lou Groza, Jan Stenerud, and Adam Vinatieri. Four of the 12 special team finalists were punters, including Ray Guy, Yale Lary, Shane Lechler, and Jerrel Wilson. Four of the 12 special team finalists were return specialists, including Mel Gray, Devin Hester, Billy "White Shoes" Johnson, and Brian Mitchell.

=== Coaches ===
On November 20, 2019, 20 head coaches were announced as finalists, including Bill Belichick, Paul Brown, Guy Chamberlin, Tony Dungy, Weeb Ewbank, Joe Gibbs, Sid Gillman, Bud Grant, George Halas, Curly Lambeau, Tom Landry, Marv Levy, Vince Lombardi, John Madden, Chuck Noll, Steve Owen, Bill Parcells, Fritz Pollard, Don Shula, and Bill Walsh.

== Selection panel ==
Members of the 26 person panel were:

League voters

- Joel Bussert: Former NFL Vice President of Player Personnel and NFL historian
- Joe Horrigan: 42-year Pro Football Hall of Fame executive
- Chris Willis: NFL Films historian

Coaches

- Bill Belichick: Six-time Super Bowl-winning head coach
- Tony Dungy: Pro Football Hall of Famer and Super Bowl-winning head coach
- Dick LeBeau: Pro Football Hall of Fame defensive back and two-time Super Bowl-winning defensive coordinator
- John Madden: Pro Football Hall of Famer and Super Bowl-winning head coach
- Don Shula: Pro Football Hall of Famer and two-time Super Bowl-winning head coach
- Dick Vermeil: Pro Football Hall of Famer and Super Bowl-winning head coach

General managers

- Ernie Accorsi: 19-year NFL general manager
- Gil Brandt: Pro Football Hall of Famer and two-time Super Bowl-winning front office executive
- Charley Casserly: Super Bowl-winning general manager
- Bill Polian: Pro Football Hall of Famer and Super Bowl-winning general manager
- Ron Wolf: Pro Football Hall of Famer and three-time Super Bowl-winning general manager

Players

- Dan Fouts: Pro Football Hall of Fame quarterback and veteran broadcaster
- Ron Jaworski: Former NFL quarterback and veteran broadcaster
- Ozzie Newsome: Pro Football Hall of Fame tight end and two-time Super Bowl-winning general manager
- Art Shell: Pro Football Hall of Fame offensive tackle, two-time Super Bowl champion and former head coach

Media

- Dave Anderson: Pulitzer Prize-winning columnist with The New York Times who covered the NFL for more than 50 years
- Judy Battista: NFL Media national columnist and reporter
- Jarrett Bell: Pro Football Hall of Fame voter and USA Today NFL columnist
- Chris Berman: ESPN anchor since 1979
- Rick Gosselin: Pro Football Hall of Fame voter and former Dallas Morning News columnist
- Peter King: Pro Football Hall of Fame voter and veteran sportswriter
- Don Pierson: Author and veteran sportswriter
- Charean Williams: Pro Football Hall of Fame voter, veteran sportswriter and president of the Pro Football Writers Association

== See also ==
- NFL All-Decade Teams
- NFL 50th Anniversary All-Time Team
- NFL 75th Anniversary All-Time Team
- The Top 100: NFL's Greatest Players
