= NFL All-Decade Teams =

The National Football League (NFL) All-Decade Teams are honorary teams named by members of the Pro Football Hall of Fame selection committee.

NFL All-Decade Teams include:

- NFL 1920s All-Decade Team
- NFL 1930s All-Decade Team
- NFL 1940s All-Decade Team
- NFL 1950s All-Decade Team
- NFL 1960s All-Decade Team
- NFL 1970s All-Decade Team
- NFL 1980s All-Decade Team
- NFL 1990s All-Decade Team
- NFL 2000s All-Decade Team
- NFL 2010s All-Decade Team

== See also ==
- American Football League All-Time Team
- Sports Illustrated NFL All-Decade Team (2009)
- NFL 50th Anniversary All-Time Team
- NFL 75th Anniversary All-Time Team
- NFL 100th Anniversary All-Time Team
- The Top 100: NFL's Greatest Players
