= NFL 50th Anniversary All-Time Team =

1969 list of American football players

The National Football League 50th Anniversary All-Time Team was selected in 1969 by Pro Football Hall of Fame voters from each franchise city of the National Football League (NFL) to honor the greatest players of the first 50 years of the league. A total of 16 players were named, including 15 position winners and one special "legend" category for Jim Thorpe, who was described "as the star that never diminishes." At the time, all but three of the players had played in 20 prior years; four were on NFL rosters at the time of the selections: Johnny Unitas, Gale Sayers, John Mackey, and Ray Nitschke. Additionally, two runners-up were also named for each of the 15 positions.

Seven of the sixteen players from the 50th Anniversary All-Time Team also made the NFL 75th Anniversary All-Time Team: Johnny Unitas, Jim Brown, Gale Sayers, Don Hutson, Gino Marchetti, Ray Nitschke, and Dick "Night Train" Lane.

Eleven of the sixteen players from the 50th Anniversary All-Time Team also made the NFL 100th Anniversary All-Time Team: Johnny Unitas, Jim Brown, Gale Sayers, Don Hutson, Elroy Hirsch, John Mackey, Cal Hubbard, Chuck Bednarik, Gino Marchetti, Dick "Night Train" Lane, and Emlen Tunnell.

With Jerry Kramer making the Hall of Fame class of 2018, all members of the 50th Anniversary All-Time Team have been inducted into the Pro Football Hall of Fame.

== Offense ==
Position	Player	Team(s) played for
Legend (Note: Special category)	Jim Thorpe	Canton Bulldogs (1915–1917, 1919–1920); Cleveland Indians (1921); Oorang Indians (1922–1923); Rock Island Independents (1924); New York Giants (1925); Rock Island Independents (1925); Tampa Cardinals (1926); Canton Bulldogs (1926); Chicago Cardinals (1928)
QB	Johnny Unitas (Note: Active at time of selection)	Baltimore Colts (1956–1972); San Diego Chargers (1973)
FB	Jim Brown	Cleveland Browns (1957–1965)
HB	Gale Sayers	Chicago Bears (1965–1971)
SE	Don Hutson	Green Bay Packers (1935–1945)
FL	Elroy Hirsch	Chicago Rockets (1946–1948); Los Angeles Rams (1949–1957)
TE	John Mackey	Baltimore Colts (1963–1971); San Diego Chargers (1972)
OT	Cal Hubbard	New York Giants (1927–1928, 1936); Green Bay Packers (1929–1933, 1935); Pittsburgh Pirates (1936)
G	Jerry Kramer	Green Bay Packers (1958–1968)
C	Chuck Bednarik	Philadelphia Eagles (1949–1962)

== Defense ==
Position	Player	Team(s) played for
DE	Gino Marchetti	Dallas Texans (1952); Baltimore Colts (1953–1964, 1966)
DT	Leo Nomellini	San Francisco 49ers (1950–1963)
LB	Ray Nitschke	Green Bay Packers (1958–1972)
CB	Night Train Lane	Los Angeles Rams (1952–1953); Chicago Cardinals (1954–1959); Detroit Lions (1960–1965)
S	Emlen Tunnell	New York Giants (1948–1958); Green Bay Packers (1959–1961)

== Special teams ==
Position	Player	Team(s) played for
PK	Lou Groza	Cleveland Browns (1946–1967)

== Runners-up ==
Two runners-up were selected for each of the 15 positions as follows:

QB: Sammy Baugh and Norm Van Brocklin; FB: Bronko Nagurski and Joe Perry; HB: Harold Grange and Hugh McElhenny; SE: Raymond Berry and Dante Lavelli; FL: Boyd Dowler and Lenny Moore; TE: Mike Ditka and Ron Kramer; OT: Forrest Gregg and Joe Stydahar; G: Dan Fortmann and Jim Parker; C: Mel Hein and Alex Wojciechowicz; DE: Len Ford and Deacon Jones; DT: Art Donovan and Ernie Stautner; LB: Joe Schmidt and Clyde Turner; CB: Herb Adderley and Jack Butler, S: Jack Christiansen and Larry Wilson; PK: Ernie Nevers and Ken Strong.

== See also ==
- NFL 75th Anniversary All-Time Team
- NFL 100th Anniversary All-Time Team
- NFL All-Decade Teams
- The Top 100: NFL's Greatest Players
