= Gary Zimmerman =

American football player (born 1961)

No. 65
- Position: Offensive tackle

Personal information
- Born: December 13, 1961 (age 64); Fullerton, California, U.S.
- Listed height: 6 ft 6 in (1.98 m)
- Listed weight: 294 lb (133 kg)

Career information
- High school: Walnut (Walnut, California)
- College: Oregon (1980–1983)
- Supplemental draft: 1984: 1st round, 3rd overall pick

Career history
- Los Angeles Express (1984–1985); Minnesota Vikings (1986–1992); Denver Broncos (1993–1997)

Awards and highlights
- Super Bowl champion (XXXII); 3× First-team All-Pro (1987, 1988, 1996); 2× Second-team All-Pro (1993, 1995); 7× Pro Bowl (1987–1989, 1992, 1994–1996); NFL 1980s All-Decade Team; NFL 1990s All-Decade Team; 50 Greatest Vikings; Denver Broncos Ring of Fame; Morris Trophy (1983); 2× USFL All-Star (1984, 1985); USFL All-Time Team; First-team All-American (1983); First-team All-Pac-10 (1983)

Career NFL statistics
- Games played: 184
- Games started: 184
- Fumble recoveries: 4
- Stats at Pro Football Reference
- Pro Football Hall of Fame

Gary Wayne Zimmerman (born December 13, 1961) is an American former professional football player who was a Hall of Fame offensive tackle in the National Football League (NFL) and United States Football League (USFL). He earned a Super Bowl ring with the Denver Broncos (Super Bowl XXXII).

Zimmerman was born in Fullerton, California and played scholastically at Walnut High School in the San Gabriel Valley of California. He played collegiately at Oregon, and was a first-team All-American as a senior. He was inducted into the Oregon Sports Hall of Fame in 2002.

Zimmerman played for the Minnesota Vikings from 1986 to 1992 and for the Denver Broncos from 1993 to 1997. He won Super Bowl XXXII with the Broncos against the Green Bay Packers. He was selected to the Pro Bowl seven times and was an All-Pro selection eight times. He was inducted into the Pro Football Hall of Fame in 2008.

== Professional career ==
=== Los Angeles Express ===
In 1984, Zimmerman was drafted in the second round (36th overall) by the Los Angeles Express in the 1984 USFL draft. He subsequently signed with the Express on February 13, 1984, and went on to play in 17 games that season, starting all 17 at left tackle. His Express teammate was future Pro Football Hall of Famer, QB Steve Young. The Express lost in the USFL Semi-Finals to the Arizona Wranglers to end a 10–8 regular season. In 1985, Zimmerman suited up again with the Express, playing in 18 games (starting 17) with a 3-15 club that ended up out of the USFL playoff picture.

=== Minnesota Vikings ===
After the USFL folded in August 1986, Zimmerman joined the Minnesota Vikings after they obtained his rights from the New York Giants who drafted him in the 1984 NFL Supplemental Draft of USFL and CFL Players.

During his time in the NFL, Zimmerman was famous for his refusal to interact with the media. This disdain for the sports press came about due to an early incident in his NFL career, after comments made by Zimmerman (which stated both the offense and defense didn't play well enough) were construed to be comments that the defense didn't play well enough that led to teammates ostracizing him for speaking ill of his teammates' performance; this led Zimmerman to decide to boycott the sports media as a result, refusing to do interviews or engage in any sort of interaction with them for the rest of his career.

=== Denver Broncos ===
Zimmerman ultimately left the Vikings for the Broncos in 1993, and stayed with the team from 1993 to 1997. He would be part of the team's first Super Bowl-winning squad, winning the game in 1997 and was "in spirit" for the 1998 season. Arriving as the veteran player in 1993 to an offense that was made up of mostly rookies, Zimmerman became the de facto leader of the Broncos offensive line on and off the field. Zimmerman started the Denver offensive line tradition of not speaking to the media. It became a long running tradition that would continue on a full decade after his retirement in 1997. In 2007 the NFL created “The Broncos O-line rule" in response, requiring all players to talk to the media.

He played in 184 NFL games, starting 169 of them.

On February 2, 2008, he was elected to the Pro Football Hall of Fame.

Zimmerman joins Reggie White, Sam Mills, Steve Young, Jim Kelly, Marv Levy, George Allen, Bill Polian, and Sid Gillman as former USFL/AFL league members who are enshrined in the Pro Football Hall of Fame.
