= Chris Doleman =

American football player (1961–2020)

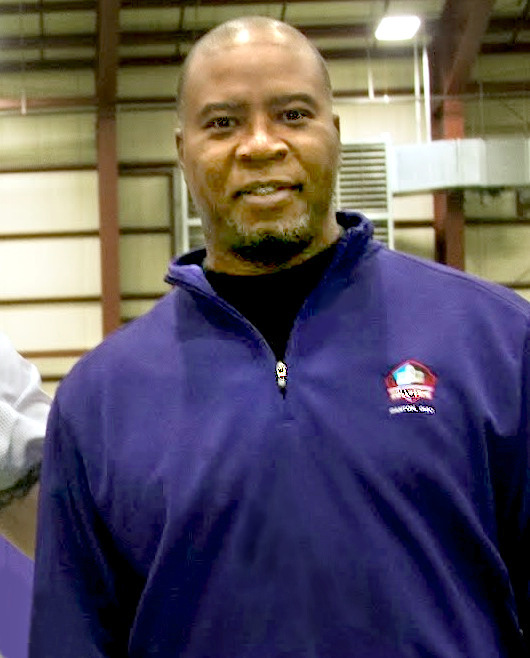
- Doleman in 2013

No. 56
- Position: Defensive end

Personal information
- Born: October 16, 1961; Indianapolis, Indiana, U.S.
- Died: January 28, 2020 (aged 58); Duluth, Georgia, U.S.
- Listed height: 6 ft 5 in (1.96 m)
- Listed weight: 289 lb (131 kg)

Career information
- High school: William Penn (York, Pennsylvania)
- College: Pittsburgh (1981–1984)
- NFL draft: 1985: 1st round, 4th overall pick

Career history
- Minnesota Vikings (1985–1993); Atlanta Falcons (1994–1995); San Francisco 49ers (1996–1998); Minnesota Vikings (1999)

Awards and highlights
- 3× First-team All-Pro (1987, 1989, 1992); 2× Second-team All-Pro (1990, 1993); 8× Pro Bowl (1987–1990, 1992, 1993, 1995, 1997); NFL sacks leader (1989); NFL 1990s All-Decade Team; PFWA All-Rookie Team (1985); Minnesota Vikings Ring of Honor; 50 Greatest Vikings; Second-team All-East (1983); Sugar Bowl champion (1981)

Career NFL statistics
- Tackles: 975
- Sacks: 150.5
- Safeties: 2
- Forced fumbles: 44
- Fumble recoveries: 24
- Interceptions: 8
- Defensive touchdowns: 3
- Stats at Pro Football Reference
- Pro Football Hall of Fame

Christopher John Doleman (October 16, 1961 – January 28, 2020) was an American professional football defensive end who played in the National Football League (NFL). He spent the majority of his career with the Minnesota Vikings, and also played for the Atlanta Falcons and the San Francisco 49ers. Doleman was an eight-time Pro Bowl selection and three-time first-team All-Pro, recording 150.5 career sacks. He is a member of the Pro Football Hall of Fame class of 2012.

== Early life ==
Doleman attended William Penn Senior High School in York, Pennsylvania, and graduated in 1980. He spent a postgraduate year at Valley Forge Military Academy in 1981.

== College career ==
Doleman played football collegiately at the University of Pittsburgh. He was a star linebacker and defensive end for the Pitt Panthers from 1981 to 1984. He ended his career at Pitt with 25 sacks which was good for third all-time at the time of his departure. That total still ranks sixth in the Pitt annals.

== Professional career ==
Doleman was selected by the Minnesota Vikings in the first round (4th overall) of the 1985 NFL draft. He began his NFL career as an outside linebacker (OLB) in the Vikings' 3–4 defense, but for the 1987 season (Doleman's third season) the team decided to switch to a 4–3 defense, which resulted in him being moved from his spot at OLB up to the defensive line to play as a defensive end. The move paid off for Doleman, who recorded 21 sacks in the 1989 season, the highest total recorded that season and the fourth-highest total ever. The 21 sacks in a single season was a Vikings record until Jared Allen recorded 22 sacks in 2011. Doleman later played for the Atlanta Falcons and the San Francisco 49ers before returning to the Vikings in 1999 for his final season.

He was a first-team All-Pro in 1987, 1989 and 1992. He garnered second-team All-Pro selections in 1990 and 1993.

In 2012, Doleman was elected to the Pro Football Hall of Fame.

== NFL career statistics ==
Legend
	Led the league
**Bold**	Career high

Year	Team	Games		Tackles				Interceptions						Fumbles		
Year	Team	GP	GS	Cmb	Solo	Ast	Sck	Int	Yds	Avg	Lng	TD	PD	FF	FR	Yds
1985	MIN	16	13	**113**	—	—	0.5	1	5	5.0	5	0	0	0	3	0
1986	MIN	16	9	49	—	—	3.0	1	**59**	**59.0**	**59**	**1**	0	2	0	0
1987	MIN	12	12	57	—	—	11.0	0	0	0.0	0	0	0	**6**	0	0
1988	MIN	16	16	58	—	—	8.0	0	0	0.0	0	0	0	2	0	0
1989	MIN	16	16	94	—	—	**21.0**	0	0	0.0	0	0	0	5	**5**	7
1990	MIN	16	16	92	—	—	11.0	1	30	30.0	30	0	0	4	0	0
1991	MIN	16	16	101	—	—	7.0	0	0	0.0	0	0	0	1	2	7
1992	MIN	16	16	64	—	—	14.5	1	27	27.0	27	**1**	0	**6**	3	0
1993	MIN	16	16	68	—	—	12.5	1	−3	−3.0	−3	0	0	3	1	0
1994	ATL	14	7	30	26	4	7.0	1	2	2.0	2	0	0	1	0	0
1995	ATL	16	16	51	36	**15**	9.0	0	0	0.0	0	0	0	1	2	0
1996	SF	16	16	54	**45**	9	11.0	**2**	1	0.5	1	0	0	4	3	**13**
1997	SF	16	16	46	39	7	12.0	0	0	0.0	0	0	0	3	1	0
1998	SF	16	16	45	31	14	15.0	0	0	0.0	0	0	0	4	2	0
1999	MIN	14	12	53	41	12	8.0	0	0	0.0	0	0	**2**	2	2	7
Career		232	213	975	218	61	150.5	8	121	15.1	59	2	2	44	24	34

== Personal life and death ==
On January 25, 2018, Doleman had brain surgery for a condition which was later diagnosed as glioblastoma. On January 28, 2020, Doleman died from the disease at the age of 58. He was honored prior to kickoff at Super Bowl LIV five days later.
