= Walter Jones (American football) =

American football player (born 1974)

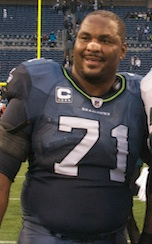
- Jones in 2008

No. 71
- Position: Offensive tackle

Personal information
- Born: January 19, 1974 (age 52); Aliceville, Alabama, U.S.
- Listed height: 6 ft 5 in (1.96 m)
- Listed weight: 325 lb (147 kg)

Career information
- High school: Aliceville
- College: Holmes CC (1993–1994); Florida State (1995–1996)
- NFL draft: 1997: 1st round, 6th overall pick

Career history
- Seattle Seahawks (1997–2008)

Awards and highlights
- 4× First-team All-Pro (2001, 2004, 2005, 2007); 2× Second-team All-Pro (2006, 2008); 9× Pro Bowl (1999, 2001–2008); NFL 2000s All-Decade Team; NFL 100th Anniversary All-Time Team; PFWA All-Rookie Team (1997); Seattle Seahawks 35th Anniversary team; Seattle Seahawks Top 50 players; Seattle Seahawks Ring of Honor; Seattle Seahawks No. 71 retired; Second-team All-American (1996); Second-team All-ACC (1996)

Career NFL statistics
- Games played: 180
- Games started: 180
- Fumble recoveries: 3
- Stats at Pro Football Reference
- Pro Football Hall of Fame

Walter Junior Jones (born January 19, 1974) is an American former professional football player who was an offensive tackle in the National Football League (NFL) for 12 seasons. Born in Alabama, he played college football for the Florida State Seminoles.

Jones played his entire professional career with the Seattle Seahawks, where he was a seven-time All-Pro selection and eventual NFL 2000s All-Decade Team honoree. Starting in each of his 180 games in Seattle, the Seahawks attempted more than 5,500 passes with Jones on the field, while Jones gave up a total of only 23 quarterback sacks, and was penalized for holding just nine times. Jones is considered one of the greatest offensive tackles of all time, having made nine Pro Bowls and six All-Pro teams. On February 1, 2014, Jones was selected to the Pro Football Hall of Fame in his first year of eligibility.

== College career ==
Jones attended Holmes Community College for two seasons, where he was named Mississippi Junior College Player of the Year by the Jackson Clarion-Ledger in 1994. Then 6′5″ (1.96 m) and 265 pounds (120 kg), Jones played both offensive tackle and tight end. He allowed one sack in two seasons.

After transferring to Florida State University, Jones played for coach Bobby Bowden's Seminoles teams in 1995 and 1996. He had to redshirt the 1995 season. As a junior in 1996, Jones started 11 games and the Sugar Bowl for the Seminoles and allowed one sack, subsequently earning second-team All-ACC honors. He decided to forgo his final year of college eligibility and enter the 1997 NFL draft.

== Professional career ==
Pre-draft measurables
Height	Weight	Arm length	Hand span	40-yard dash	10-yard split	20-yard split	20-yard shuttle	Three-cone drill	Vertical jump	Broad jump
6 ft 4 7/8 in (1.95 m)	301 lb (137 kg)	34 1/2 in (0.88 m)	9 7/8 in (0.25 m)	5.09 s	1.84 s	3.05 s	4.73 s	8.23 s	30.5 in (0.77 m)	9 ft 0 in (2.74 m)
All values from NFL Combine

Jones was drafted by the Seahawks in the first round with the sixth overall pick in the 1997 NFL draft. He started every game in which he played, beginning with his rookie season. Jones was a member of the 2005 Seahawks team that lost Super Bowl XL to the Pittsburgh Steelers. In 2006, Jones topped the list of the 101 best NFL players by the Sporting News.

Jones was a nine-time Pro Bowl selection and seven-time All-Pro. Jones was perhaps the best at his position in the NFL during the early part of the decade, exemplified by being voted to the NFL's 2000s All-Decade Team. From 1998 through 2000, he helped Ricky Watters achieve three consecutive 1,000-yard seasons for the Seahawks and, later, paved the way for Shaun Alexander's NFL record-setting success.

Jones was recognized by John Madden as the best player in the NFL in 2004 in a broadcast. Madden recognized Jones in numerous broadcasts as the best left tackle in the NFL and possibly one of the best of all time.

Seahawks coach Mike Holmgren has called Jones the best offensive player he had ever coached.

On Thanksgiving 2008, Jones succumbed to a knee injury playing against the Cowboys in his 180th and final game. The injury required microfracture surgery to repair and immediately ended his season. Jones tried to play again in 2009 but was unsuccessful. On October 28, 2009, Jones was placed on injured reserve by the Seahawks. In a press conference the same day, Jones stated his intention to play in 2010. On April 29, 2010, Jones announced on his Twitter account that he would retire.

The Seahawks announced the retirement of his number, 71, and governor Christine Gregoire declared April 30 to be "Walter Jones Day" in the state of Washington.

On December 5, 2010, in a game versus the Carolina Panthers, in front of a crowd of over 66,000, the Seahawks honored the career of Jones by retiring his #71 jersey. This was only the second player number (#80 Steve Largent was the first) to be retired by the Seahawks (they have also retired #12 in honor of the fans).

On January 8, 2011, Jones lifted the 12th Man flag at Qwest Field before the Seahawks' wild card matchup against the New Orleans Saints. The 7–9 Seahawks went on to defeat the defending Super Bowl champion Saints 41–36.

On February 2, 2014, Jones served as the Seahawks' honorary captain at Super Bowl XLVIII at MetLife Stadium in East Rutherford, New Jersey, prior to their 43–8 victory over the Broncos. This coincided with his election onto the Pro Football Hall of Fame. He also helped former Giant and fellow Hall of Famer Michael Strahan toss the coin to end the pregame ceremonies.
