= Mike Haynes (cornerback) =

American football player (born 1953)

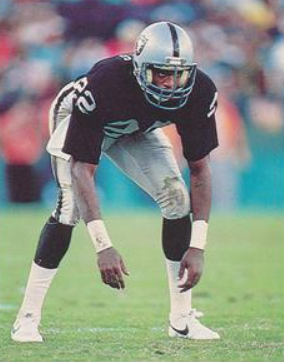

No. 40, 22
- Position: Cornerback

Personal information
- Born: July 1, 1953 (age 73); Denison, Texas, U.S.
- Listed height: 6 ft 2 in (1.88 m)
- Listed weight: 192 lb (87 kg)

Career information
- High school: John Marshall (Los Angeles, California)
- College: Arizona State (1972–1975)
- NFL draft: 1976: 1st round, 5th overall pick

Career history
- New England Patriots (1976–1982); Los Angeles Raiders (1983–1989)

Awards and highlights
- Super Bowl champion (XVIII); NFL Defensive Rookie of the Year (1976); 2× First-team All-Pro (1984, 1985); 6× Second-team All-Pro (1976–1980, 1982); 9× Pro Bowl (1976–1980, 1982, 1984–1986); NFL 1980s All-Decade Team; NFL 75th Anniversary All-Time Team; NFL 100th Anniversary All-Time Team; PFWA All-Rookie Team (1976); New England Patriots All-1970s Team; New England Patriots 35th Anniversary Team; New England Patriots 50th Anniversary Team; New England Patriots Hall of Fame; New England Patriots No. 40 retired; First-team All-American (1975); Arizona State Sun Devils No. 40 retired

Career NFL statistics
- Interceptions: 46
- Interception yards: 688
- Total touchdowns: 5
- Stats at Pro Football Reference
- Pro Football Hall of Fame
- College Football Hall of Fame

Michael James Haynes (born July 1, 1953) is an American former professional football player who was a cornerback in the National Football League (NFL) for the New England Patriots and the Los Angeles Raiders. Regarded as one of the greatest cornerbacks of all time, he used his speed, physicality, quickness and range to become both an elite defensive back and an outstanding punt returner. Haynes was inducted into the College Football Hall of Fame in 2000 and the Pro Football Hall of Fame in 1997. He was also named to the NFL 75th Anniversary All-Time Team in 1994, as well the NFL 100th Anniversary All-Time Team in 2019 for his accomplishments during his 14-year career.

Voted NFL Defensive Rookie of the Year in 1976, Haynes would go to be a nine-time Pro Bowler and two-time first-team All-Pro throughout his career, in addition to six selections as a second-team All-Pro (including five consecutive from 1976 to 1980). He was also named to the NFL 1980s All-Decade Team. His younger brother Reggie was a tight end for the Washington Redskins.

== Early life ==
Haynes went to T.S. King Middle School, as stated by him in the 2012 recognition for his Hall of Fame (NFL) awards. Haynes played cornerback at John Marshall High School in Los Angeles. The team on which he played chose two all star players to represent Marshall, which would eventually lead to his further career. In addition to football, Haynes also participated in track and field and currently holds the long jump record at John Marshall. During his senior year in 1971, Haynes started both ways on offense (QB) and defense (cornerback). However, Marshall went 0–7–1 in the Northern League in 1971 and tied Belmont 20–20 in his final game. In a show of his athletic accomplishments, John Marshall High School named the school football stadium in his honor when he was inducted into the school football hall of fame in 1986.

In his final regular season track meet, Haynes had to run the final leg of the mile relay, then rest before completing his final long jump effort. The opposing team (archrival Belmont), believing they had won the league championship, loaded their bus and went home. Haynes rested, then leaped 23'5", a school record that still stands, winning the event, the meet and the league championship with it.

== College career ==
At Arizona State, Haynes was a three-time All-Western Athletic Conference selection, and a two-time All-America selection. In his four seasons, Haynes intercepted 17 passes, including a nation-leading 11 interceptions in his junior season of 1974. He also set a school record that same year by returning 46 punts, and scored two touchdowns on punt returns in 1975. In 2000, he was inducted into the College Football Hall of Fame.

== Professional career ==
=== New England Patriots ===
Haynes was selected fifth overall in the first round in the 1976 NFL draft by the New England Patriots. He enjoyed a sensational rookie year with the Patriots with eight interceptions, three fumble recoveries, and an AFC-leading 608 yards on 45 punt returns. That year, Haynes gave the Patriots their first-ever touchdowns on punt returns with 89-yard and 62-yard returns. He earned a Pro Bowl invitation as a rookie, the first of nine Pro Bowl bids. He also won NFL Defensive Rookie of the Year honors. The 1976 Patriots had an 11–3 record and clinched a playoff berth for the first time in 13 years, losing to Oakland in the first round. In 1978, Haynes recorded 6 interceptions, one of which was returned for a touchdown against the Baltimore Colts. The Patriots won their division but lost to Houston in the playoffs.

Haynes recorded 28 interceptions and 1,159 yards on 111 returns, a 10.4-yard average during his seven years with the Patriots. He started his career with 58 consecutive starts before being sidelined with a rib injury late in 1979.

Haynes was inducted into the Patriots Hall of Fame in 1994, and his number 40 was retired as well. He was named to the Patriots' All-1970s Team, the 35th Anniversary Team named in 1994, as well as the 50th Anniversary Team named in 2009. He makes sporadic appearances involving the team to this day.

=== Los Angeles Raiders ===
Haynes played out his option with the Patriots in 1982, and in November 1983, his contract was awarded to the Los Angeles Raiders in a settlement that gave the Patriots a No. 1 draft choice in 1984 and a No. 2 pick in 1985. After playing the last five regular season games, he started in the Raiders' Super Bowl XVIII victory, notching one interception, two pass breakups and one tackle. His partner in the Raiders' secondary was Lester Hayes, and the tandem was quickly recognized as one of the best cornerback duos in league history. Washington Redskins general manager Bobby Beathard later said that Haynes tipped the balance heavily in the Raiders' favor. The Raiders and Redskins had played in the regular season when Haynes was still a Patriot, and his addition gave the Raiders the luxury of having two shutdown corners.

In seven seasons with the Raiders, Haynes returned only one punt but he added 18 interceptions to give him a career total of 46 which were returned for 688 yards and two touchdowns, including a team-record 97-yard return against Miami in 1984. Haynes finished that season with a league-leading 220 interception return yards. He also had 12 career fumble recoveries. Haynes was an All-Pro choice in 1977, 1978, 1982, 1984 and 1985 and an All-AFC pick eight times. On special teams, he totaled 112 punt returns for 1,168 yards and two scores.

In 1997, he was elected to the Pro Football Hall of Fame. In 1999, he was ranked number 93 on The Sporting News' list of the 100 Greatest Football Players. He is ranked number 49 on the NFL Network Top 100 Greatest Players.

== Personal life ==
Haynes's nephew is basketball player Justin Bibbs.
