= NFL 75th Anniversary All-Time Team =

1994 list of American football players

The National Football League 75th Anniversary All-Time Team was chosen by a selection committee of media and league personnel in 1994 to honor the greatest players of the first 75 years of the National Football League (NFL). Five players on the list were on NFL rosters at the time of the selections: Joe Montana, Jerry Rice, Rod Woodson, Reggie White, and Ronnie Lott. Gale Sayers was named to the team as both a halfback and kickoff returner. Every player is a member of the Pro Football Hall of Fame, except for Billy "White Shoes" Johnson.

== Offense ==
Position	Player	Team(s) played for
QB	Sammy Baugh	Washington Redskins (1937–1952)
QB	Otto Graham	Cleveland Browns (1946–1955) (Note: The Browns competed in the All-America Football Conference from 1946 to 1949.)
QB	Johnny Unitas	Pittsburgh Steelers (1955); Baltimore Colts (1956–1972); San Diego Chargers (1973)
QB	Joe Montana	San Francisco 49ers (1979–1992); Kansas City Chiefs (1993–1994)
FB	Jim Brown	Cleveland Browns (1957–1965)
FB	Marion Motley	Cleveland Browns (1946–1953); Pittsburgh Steelers (1955)
FB	Bronko Nagurski	Chicago Bears (1930–1937, 1943)
HB	Walter Payton	Chicago Bears (1975–1987)
HB	Gale Sayers	Chicago Bears (1965–1971)
HB	O. J. Simpson	Buffalo Bills (1969–1977); San Francisco 49ers (1978–1979)
HB	Steve Van Buren	Philadelphia Eagles (1944–1951)
WR	Lance Alworth	San Diego Chargers (1962–1970); Dallas Cowboys (1971–1972)
WR	Raymond Berry	Baltimore Colts (1955–1967)
WR	Don Hutson	Green Bay Packers (1935–1945)
WR	Jerry Rice	San Francisco 49ers (1985–2000); Oakland Raiders (2001–2004); Seattle Seahawks (2004)
TE	Mike Ditka	Chicago Bears (1961–1966); Philadelphia Eagles (1967–1968); Dallas Cowboys (1969–1972)
TE	Kellen Winslow	San Diego Chargers (1979–1987)
OT	Roosevelt Brown	New York Giants (1953–1965)
OT	Forrest Gregg	Green Bay Packers (1956, 1958–1970); Dallas Cowboys (1971)
OT	Anthony Muñoz	Cincinnati Bengals (1980–1992)
G	John Hannah	New England Patriots (1973–1985)
G	Jim Parker	Baltimore Colts (1957–1967)
G	Gene Upshaw	Oakland Raiders (1967–1981)
C	Mel Hein	New York Giants (1931–1945)
C	Mike Webster	Pittsburgh Steelers (1974–1988); Kansas City Chiefs (1989–1990)

== Defense ==
Position	Player	Team(s) played for
DE	Deacon Jones	Los Angeles Rams (1961–1971); San Diego Chargers (1972–1973); Washington Redskins (1974)
DE	Gino Marchetti	Dallas Texans (1952); Baltimore Colts (1953–1964, 1966)
DE	Reggie White	Philadelphia Eagles (1985–1992); Green Bay Packers (1993–1998); Carolina Panthers (2000)
DT	"Mean" Joe Greene	Pittsburgh Steelers (1969–1981)
DT	Bob Lilly	Dallas Cowboys (1961–1974)
DT	Merlin Olsen	Los Angeles Rams (1962–1976)
LB	Dick Butkus	Chicago Bears (1965–1973)
LB	Jack Ham	Pittsburgh Steelers (1971–1982)
LB	Ted Hendricks	Baltimore Colts (1969–1973); Green Bay Packers (1974); Oakland/Los Angeles Raiders (1975–1983)
LB	Jack Lambert	Pittsburgh Steelers (1974–1984)
LB	Willie Lanier	Kansas City Chiefs (1967–1977)
LB	Ray Nitschke	Green Bay Packers (1958–1972)
LB	Lawrence Taylor	New York Giants (1981–1993)
CB	Mel Blount	Pittsburgh Steelers (1970–1983)
CB	Mike Haynes	New England Patriots (1976–1982); Los Angeles Raiders (1983–1989)
CB	Dick "Night Train" Lane	Los Angeles Rams (1952–1953); Chicago Cardinals (1954–1959); Detroit Lions (1960–1965)
CB	Rod Woodson	Pittsburgh Steelers (1987–1996); San Francisco 49ers (1997); Baltimore Ravens (1998–2001); Oakland Raiders (2002–2003)
S
S	Ronnie Lott	San Francisco 49ers (1981–1990); Los Angeles Raiders (1991–1992); New York Jets (1993–1994)
S	Larry Wilson	St. Louis Cardinals (1960–1972)
S	Ken Houston	Houston Oilers (1967–1972); Washington Redskins (1973–1980)

== Special teams ==
Position	Player	Team(s) played for
P	Ray Guy	Oakland/Los Angeles Raiders (1973–1986)
PK	Jan Stenerud	Kansas City Chiefs (1967–1979); Green Bay Packers (1980–1983); Minnesota Vikings (1984–1985)
PR	Billy "White Shoes" Johnson	Houston Oilers (1974–1980); Atlanta Falcons (1982–1987); Washington Redskins (1988)
KR	Gale Sayers	Chicago Bears (1965–1971)

== 75th Anniversary All-Two-Way Team ==
Position	Player	Team(s) played for
Quarterback, Defensive Halfback, Punter	Sammy Baugh	Washington Redskins (1937–1952)
Center, Linebacker	Chuck Bednarik	Philadelphia Eagles (1949–1962)
Quarterback, Defensive Halfback, Punter	Earl "Dutch" Clark	Portsmouth Spartans (1931–1932); Detroit Lions (1934–1938)
Tackle, Defensive tackle	George Connor	Chicago Bears (1948–1955)
Guard, Defensive tackle	Dan Fortmann	Chicago Bears (1936–1943)
Center, Linebacker	Mel Hein	New York Giants (1931–1945)
Tackle, Defensive tackle, Punter	Wilbur "Pete" Henry	Canton Bulldogs (1920–1923, 1925–1926); New York Giants (1927); Pottsville Maroons (1927–1928)
End, Defensive Halfback	Bill Hewitt	Chicago Bears (1932−1936); Philadelphia Eagles (1937−1939); Steagles (1943)
Fullback, Linebacker, Kicker	Clarke Hinkle	Green Bay Packers (1932–1941)
Tackle, Defensive tackle	Cal Hubbard	New York Giants (1927–1928, 1936); Green Bay Packers (1929–1933, 1935); Pittsburgh Pirates (1936)
End, Defensive Halfback	Don Hutson	Green Bay Packers (1935–1945)
Back, Defensive back	George McAfee	Chicago Bears (1940–1941, 1945–1950)
Fullback, Linebacker	Marion Motley	Cleveland Browns (1946–1953); Pittsburgh Steelers (1955)
Guard-Tackle, Defensive tackle	George Musso	Chicago Bears (1933–1944)
Fullback, Linebacker	Bronko Nagurski	Chicago Bears (1930–1937, 1943)
Halfback, Defensive Halfback	Ernie Nevers	Duluth Eskimos (1926–1927); Chicago Cardinals (1929–1931)
Defensive end, Tight end	Pete Pihos	Philadelphia Eagles (1947–1955)
Tackle, Defensive tackle	Joe Stydahar	Chicago Bears (1936–1942, 1945–1946)
Running back, Defensive back	Steve Van Buren	Philadelphia Eagles (1944–1951)

== See also ==
- NFL 50th Anniversary All-Time Team
- NFL 100th Anniversary All-Time Team
- NFL All-Decade Teams
- The Top 100: NFL's Greatest Players
