= Cal Hubbard =

American football player and coach, baseball umpire (1900–1977)

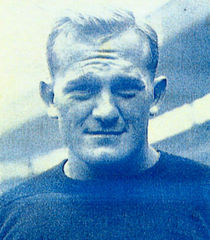

No. 41, 39, 40, 38, 27, 51, 35, 60
- Position: Tackle

Personal information
- Born: October 31, 1900; Keytesville, Missouri, U.S.
- Died: October 17, 1977 (aged 76); St. Petersburg, Florida, U.S.
- Listed height: 6 ft 2 in (1.88 m)
- Listed weight: 253 lb (115 kg)

Career information
- High school: Glasgow (Glasgow, Missouri)
- College: Centenary (1922–1924); Geneva (1925–1926)

Career history

Playing
- New York Giants (1927–1928); Green Bay Packers (1929–1933, 1935); New York Giants (1936); Pittsburgh Pirates (1936)

Coaching
- Texas A&M (1934) Line coach; Geneva (1942) Head coach

Awards and highlights
- 4× NFL champion (1927, 1929–1931); 4× First-team All-Pro (1927, 1931–1933); NFL 1920s All-Decade Team; NFL 50th Anniversary All-Time Team; NFL 75th Anniversary All-Time Team; NFL 100th Anniversary All-Time Team; Green Bay Packers Hall of Fame; 66th greatest New York Giant of all-time; Grantland Rice's All-Time All-America; Centenary College Athletic Hall of Fame; Louisiana Sports Hall of Fame; Missouri Sports Hall of Fame; Baseball Hall of Fame; Helms Foundation Hall of Fame

Career NFL statistics
- Games played: 105
- Games started: 77
- Stats at Pro Football Reference
- Pro Football Hall of Fame
- College Football Hall of Fame

Robert Calvin Hubbard (October 31, 1900 – October 17, 1977) was an American professional football player and Major League Baseball (MLB) umpire. After playing college football at Centenary College and Geneva College, Hubbard played in the National Football League (NFL) between 1927 and 1936 for the New York Giants, Green Bay Packers and Pittsburgh Pirates, playing the bulk of his career with the Packers. Hubbard is credited as being one of the inventors of the football position of linebacker.

He was also an umpire in the American League (AL) from 1936 to 1951, then worked as an umpire supervisor until 1969. George Halas affectionately called Hubbard the "Big Umpire."

To date, Hubbard is the only person to be enshrined in both the Pro Football Hall of Fame and Baseball Hall of Fame. He is also a member of the College Football Hall of Fame.

== Early life and college ==
Cal Hubbard was born in Keytesville, Missouri to parents Robert P. and Sarah "Sallie" (Ford) Hubbard. He grew up in modest means as the son of a small family farmer. Cal graduated from Keytesville High School, but because the school had no football team he also attended one year at Glasgow High School in nearby Glasgow, which did offer football. Already tall and weighing 200 pounds as a 14-year-old, Hubbard displayed natural athletic gifts. He aspired to attend the United States Military Academy at West Point, New York; however a physical discovered he had flat feet, eliminating him from eligibility.

From an early age Hubbard was involved with sports. He umpired pickup baseball games at the age of 18. Hubbard chose to attend a college or university that offered football, selecting Chillicothe Business College in Chillicothe, Missouri while also continuing to work around his family farm. A chance meeting in 1922 with Bo McMillin, the new football coach at Centenary College in Shreveport, Louisiana, led Hubbard to enroll and play football there from 1922 to 1924. Hubbard was the school's first All-American. Georgia Tech coach Bill Alexander once watched Centenary when it was in town to play Oglethorpe. "Bo, this Oglethorpe bunch has fast backs, but the line is light and green. If you turn that Hubbard loose, he might kill some of them. Have Cal 'hurt his knee', why don't you, and let him sit on the bench?"

When McMillin moved on to suburban Pittsburgh's Geneva College, Hubbard followed him and played there in 1926 (after a year of ineligibility for switching schools in 1925). Geneva opened the season with an upset of Harvard.

In an era when 6-foot players were considered tall, Hubbard was noted for remarkable speed for a player of his size, listed officially at 6-foot-2, 253 pounds but as high as 6-foot-5 in Packers' sources. He starred as a tackle and end, playing off the 7-man line in a style similar to that of a modern linebacker. Hubbard completed his college education in 1927, earning a Bachelor of Arts degree from Geneva College.

== Professional career ==
=== Football career ===
Hubbard moved on to the National Football League in 1927, signing with the New York Giants for a salary of US$150 per game. Playing alongside Steve Owen his rookie year, he helped the Giants defense allow opponents to score just 20 total points all season as they won the league championship. For his efforts Hubbard won all-league honors by the press the following year. But with a lifelong dislike for big cities, he didn't feel comfortable in New York and a 1928 road game in Green Bay led him to request a trade to the Packers, threatening to retire otherwise.

Under Packers coach Curly Lambeau, Hubbard and the team won the NFL title in each of his first three years there (1929–1931). The 1929 team surrendered just 22 points. Lambeau had Hubbard play in the line, ending his "linebacker" days. The NFL named its first official All-League team in 1931 with Cal Hubbard being one of that inaugural list. He was chosen for the honor again in 1932 and 1933. Mel Hein said Hubbard was "probably the greatest tackle I ever played against."

Once while playing the Chicago Bears with Ukrainian fullback Bronko Nagurski, the Bears prepared to punt. Hubbard went to the halfback Red Grange and said: "I promise not to try to block the kick, Red, but get out of the way so I can get a shot at that Polack." Grange, glad not to try to block Hubbard for once, obliged. Cal tore through the line, slammed into Nagurski and bounced off. Rising slowly, he turned to Grange and said: "Hey, Red, don't do me any more favors."

Hubbard stepped away from professional football following the 1933 season, taking a job as the line coach at Texas A&M in 1934. However, he was persuaded to return to play after that one year on the sidelines, returning to Green Bay in 1935. The Giants wooed him back to start 1936 with them, but he played only six games the entire season, five for the Giants and a final game for the Pittsburgh Pirates, the future Steelers. Hubbard returned to football coaching briefly, serving as head coach of his alma mater Geneva College in 1941 and 1942. He was among the initial class of inductees to the Pro Football Hall of Fame in 1963. In a 1969 poll by the Hall of Fame committee, Hubbard was voted the NFL's greatest tackle of all time.

=== Baseball career ===
Cal Hubbard
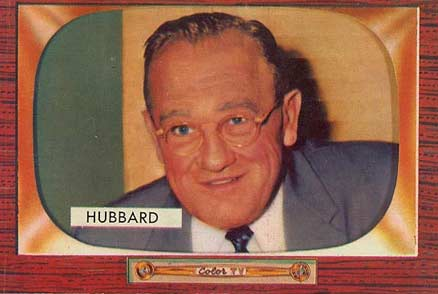
- Hubbard's 1955 Bowman baseball card
- American League Umpire (1936–1951)

Member of the National

Baseball Hall of Fame
- Induction: 1976
- Election method: Veterans Committee

Even while Hubbard's football career was going full-force, he began to focus on a second career in baseball officiating. From 1928 onward he spent his football off-season umpiring in minor league baseball. By 1936 Hubbard had been called up to the major leagues, umpiring in the American League from 1936 to 1951, a contemporary with the likes of Yogi Berra. Soon recognized as one of the game's best officials, he was selected to work in the 1938 World Series, followed by Series appearances in 1942, 1946 and 1949. In addition, he umpired in the All-Star Game in 1939, 1944 and 1949, behind the plate for half of the 1939 and 1944 midsummer classics.

Hubbard found the then-common practice of officials moving to different positions on the field during a game to be confusing and hampered accuracy when making calls. Applying his football experience to baseball, he devised a system where each official had clearly defined duties and also added an additional official to the crew. This was the foundation on which MLB established new officiating standards in 1952.

While he was hunting during the 1951 off-season, a ricocheting pellet from a friend's shotgun blast accidentally struck Hubbard in the right eye. The damage was extensive enough to force his retirement from baseball officiating. However, the American League soon hired him as an assistant supervisor for league officiating crews, and in 1954 he became the top supervisor, a position he would hold until retiring in 1969.

== Final years ==
Never a fan of big cities, Hubbard had moved to Milan, Missouri, in 1944. He left in 1945 but moved back in 1948 for good. Milan was a small town much like his native Keytesville, which is about 50 miles to the south on Missouri Route 5. A lifelong avid fisherman and hunter, the rural areas of Sullivan and neighboring counties offered ample opportunity. Hubbard stayed involved in community affairs, especially children's sports, as much as his schedule would allow. In honor of his efforts the football field at Milan High School is named Cal Hubbard Field.

Hubbard developed emphysema in the last few years of his life, so doctors suggested that he move away from the cold weather in Missouri. He relocated in 1976 to St. Petersburg, Florida. In recognition of his contributions to the game as an umpire and supervisor, Cal Hubbard was elected to the Baseball Hall of Fame in 1976, only the fifth umpire to be so honored up to that time.

Hubbard died due to cancer October 17, 1977, in St. Petersburg. He is buried in the Oakwood Cemetery, Milan, Missouri. He was survived by wife Mildred and two sons, Dr. Robert Hubbard, and William "Bill" Hubbard.

== Awards and honors ==
- Member, Missouri Sports Hall of Fame (inducted 1954)
- Charter Member, Pro Football Hall of Fame (inducted 1963)
- Member, College Football Hall of Fame (inducted 1962)
- Member, Louisiana Sports Hall of Fame (inducted 1965)
- Member, Helms Foundation Hall of Fame (inducted 1969)
- Member, Green Bay Packers Hall of Fame (inducted 1970)
- Named to All-Time All-Professional football team (1970)
- Member, National Baseball Hall of Fame (inducted 1976)
- Member, Beaver County Sports Hall of Fame (Beaver County, Pennsylvania) (inducted 1976)
- Member, Centenary College Athletic Hall of Fame (inducted posthumously, 1990)
- Named to the Grantland Rice All-Time, All-American football team
- Cal Hubbard Field (football) at Milan High School in Milan, Missouri is named in his honor.
- Cal Hubbard Field (baseball) at Keytesville, Missouri High School is named in his honor.

== Head coaching record ==
Year	Team	Overall	Conference	Standing	Bowl/playoffs
Geneva Covenanters (Independent) (1942)
1942	Geneva	6–3			
Geneva:		6–3			
Total:		6–3			
