= Reggie Haynes =

American football player (born 1954)

No. 89
- Position: Tight end

Personal information
- Born: September 15, 1954 (age 72); Denison, Texas, U.S.
- Listed height: 6 ft 2 in (1.88 m)
- Listed weight: 229 lb (104 kg)

Career information
- High school: John Marshall (CA)
- College: UNLV
- NFL draft: 1977: 7th round, 189th overall pick

Career history
- Washington Redskins (1977–1979); San Diego Chargers (1980)*
- * Offseason or practice squad member only

Career NFL statistics
- Receptions: 2
- Receiving yards: 32
- Stats at Pro Football Reference

Reginald Eugene Haynes (born September 15, 1954) is an American former professional football player who was a tight end in the National Football League (NFL) for the Washington Redskins. He played college football for the UNLV Rebels and was selected in the seventh round of the 1977 NFL draft. His older brother Mike was a cornerback for the New England Patriots and Los Angeles Raiders.
