= 1970 All-Pro Team =

Official list of the best NFL players in 1970

The following is a list of players that were named to the Associated Press All-Pro Team, the Newspaper Enterprise Association All-Pro team and the Pro Football Writers Association, and Pro Football Weekly All-Pro teams in 1970. Both first- and second- teams are listed for the NEA, and PFWA teams. These are the four All-Pro teams that are included in the Total Football II: The Official Encyclopedia of the National Football League and compose the consensus All-Pro team for 1970.

== Teams ==
Offense
Position	First team	Second team
Quarterback	John Brodie, San Francisco 49ers (AP, NEA, PFWA, PFW)	Fran Tarkenton, New York Giants (PFWA-2)
Running back	Larry Brown, Washington Redskins (AP, NEA, PFWA, PFW); Ron Johnson, New York Giants (AP, PFWA, PFW); MacArthur Lane, St. Louis Cardinals (NEA)	Mel Farr, Detroit Lions (NEA-2); Floyd Little, Denver Broncos (PFWA-2); Ron Johnson, New York Giants (NEA-2); MacArthur Lane, St. Louis Cardinals (PFWA-2)
Wide receiver	Gene Washington, San Francisco 49ers (AP, NEA, PFWA, PFW); Dick Gordon, Chicago Bears (AP, NEA, PFWA, PFW)	Paul Warfield, Miami Dolphins (NEA-2); Fred Biletnikoff, Oakland Raiders (PFWA-2); Warren Wells, Oakland Raiders (NEA-2); Marlin Briscoe, Buffalo Bills (PFWA-2)
Tight end	Charlie Sanders, Detroit Lions (AP, NEA, PFWA, PFW)	Bob Trumpy, Cincinnati Bengals (NEA-2); Raymond Chester, Oakland Raiders (PFWA-2)
Tackle	Bob Brown, Los Angeles Rams (AP, NEA, PFWA, PFW); Jim Tyrer, Kansas City Chiefs (AP, NEA, PFWA, PFW)	Winston Hill, New York Jets (NEA-2, PFWA-2); Ron Yary, Minnesota Vikings (PFWA-2); Ernie McMillan, St. Louis Cardinals (NEA-2)
Guard	Gene Upshaw, Oakland Raiders (AP, PFWA, PFW); Gale Gillingham, Green Bay Packers (AP, NEA); Tom Mack, Los Angeles Rams (PFW); Walt Sweeney, San Diego Chargers (NEA); Gene Hickerson, Cleveland Browns (PFWA)	Irv Goode, St. Louis Cardinals (NEA-2); Gale Gillingham, Green Bay Packers (PFWA-2); Tom Mack, Los Angeles Rams (NEA-2, PFWA-2)
Center	Jim Otto, Oakland Raiders (AP, NEA); Mick Tingelhoff, Minnesota Vikings (PFWA, PFW)	Ed Flanagan, Detroit Lions (PFWA-2); Mick Tingelhoff, Minnesota Vikings (NEA-2)

Special teams
Position	First team	Second team
Kicker	Jan Stenerud, Kansas City Chiefs (AP, PFWA)	George Blanda, Oakland Raiders (PFWA-2)
Punter	Dave Lewis, Cincinnati Bengals (AP, PFWA)	David Lee, Baltimore Colts (PFWA-2)

Defense
Position	First team	Second team
Defensive end	Carl Eller, Minnesota Vikings (AP, NEA, PFWA, PFW); Rich Jackson, Denver Broncos (AP, NEA, PFWA); Deacon Jones, Los Angeles Rams (PFW)	Bubba Smith, Baltimore Colts (PFWA-2); Claude Humphrey, Atlanta Falcons (NEA-2); Deacon Jones, Los Angeles Rams (NEA-2, PFWA-2)
Defensive tackle	Alan Page, Minnesota Vikings (AP, NEA, PFWA, PFW); Merlin Olsen, Los Angeles Rams (AP, NEA, PFWA, PFW)	Bob Lilly, Dallas Cowboys (NEA-2, PFWA-2); Manny Fernandez, Miami Dolphins (NEA-2); John Elliott, New York Jets (PFWA-2)
Middle linebacker	Dick Butkus, Chicago Bears (AP, NEA, PFWA, PFW)	Willie Lanier, Kansas City Chiefs (NEA-2, PFWA-2)
Outside linebacker	Bobby Bell, Kansas City Chiefs (AP, NEA, PFWA, PFW); Chuck Howley, Dallas Cowboys (AP, PFWA, PFW); Dave Wilcox, San Francisco 49ers (NEA)	Andy Russell, Pittsburgh Steelers (NEA-2); Paul Naumoff, Detroit Lions (PFWA-2); Gus Otto, Oakland Raiders (PFWA-2); Chuck Howley, Dallas Cowboys (NEA-2)
Cornerback	Jimmy Johnson, San Francisco 49ers (AP, NEA, PFWA, PFW); Willie Brown, Oakland Raiders (PFWA, PFW); Jim Marsalis, Kansas City Chiefs (AP, PFW); Roger Wehrli, St. Louis Cardinals (NEA)	Lem Barney, Detroit Lions (NEA-2); Dick LeBeau, Detroit Lions (PFWA-2); Willie Brown, Oakland Raiders (NEA-2); Jim Marsalis, Kansas City Chiefs (PFWA-2)
Safety	Johnny Robinson, Kansas City Chiefs (AP, NEA, PFWA, PFW); Larry Wilson, St. Louis Cardinals (AP, NEA, PFWA, PFW)	Ken Houston, Houston Oilers (NEA-2); Willie Wood, Green Bay Packers (NEA-2); Carl Lockhart, New York Giants (PFWA-2); Dave Grayson, Oakland Raiders (PFWA-2)

== Key ==
- AP = Associated Press All-Pro team
- PFWA = Pro Football Writers Association All-Pro team
- NEA = Newspaper Enterprise Association All-Pro team
- NEA-2 Newspaper Enterprise Association Second-team All-Pro
- PFW = Pro Football Weekly All-Pro team
- t = players tied in votes.
