= 1993 All-Pro Team =

Official list of the best NFL players in 1993

The 1993 All-Pro Team is composed of the National Football League players that were named to the Associated Press, Pro Football Writers Association, and The Sporting News All-Pro Teams in 1993. Both first and second teams are listed for the AP team. These are the three teams that are included in Total Football II: The Official Encyclopedia of the National Football League. In 1993 the Pro Football Writers Association and Pro Football Weekly combined their All-pro teams, a practice with continues through 2008.

== Teams ==
Offense
Position	First team	Second team
Quarterback	Steve Young, San Francisco 49ers (AP, PFWA); Troy Aikman, Dallas Cowboys (TSN)	John Elway, Denver Broncos (AP-2)
Running back	Jerome Bettis, Los Angeles Rams (AP, PFWA); Emmitt Smith, Dallas Cowboys (AP, PFWA, TSN); Barry Sanders Detroit Lions (TSN)	Barry Sanders, Detroit Lions (AP-2); Thurman Thomas, Buffalo Bills (AP-2)
Wide receiver	Sterling Sharpe, Green Bay Packers (AP, PFWA, TSN); Jerry Rice, San Francisco 49ers (AP, PFWA, TSN)	Michael Irvin, Dallas Cowboys (AP-2); Andre Rison, Atlanta Falcons (AP-2)
Tight end	Shannon Sharpe, Denver Broncos (AP, PFWA, TSN)	Brent Jones, San Francisco 49ers (AP-2)
Tackle	Erik Williams, Dallas Cowboys (AP, PFWA, TSN); Harris Barton, San Francisco 49ers (AP, PFWA, TSN)	Gary Zimmerman, Denver Broncos (AP-2); Richmond Webb, Miami Dolphins (AP-2)
Guard	Randall McDaniel, Minnesota Vikings (AP, PFWA, TSN); Steve Wisniewski, Los Angeles Raiders (PFWA, TSN); Chris Hinton, Atlanta Falcons (AP)	Mike Munchak, Houston Oilers (AP-2); Steve Wisniewski, Los Angeles Raiders (AP-2)
Center	Bruce Matthews, Houston Oilers (PFWA, TSN); Dermontti Dawson, Pittsburgh Steelers (AP)	Bruce Matthews, Houston Oilers (AP-2)

Special teams
Position	First team	Second team
Kicker	Norm Johnson, Atlanta Falcons (PFWA); Chris Jacke, Green Bay Packers (AP); Jason Hanson, Detroit Lions (TSN)	Norm Johnson, Atlanta Falcons (AP-2)
Punter	Greg Montgomery, Houston Oilers (AP, PFWA, TSN)	Rich Camarillo, Phoenix Cardinals (AP-2)
Kick Returner	Eric Metcalf, Cleveland Browns (AP); Tyrone Hughes, New Orleans Saints (PFWA); Mel Gray, Detroit Lions (TSN)	Tyrone Hughes, New Orleans Saints (AP-2)
Punt Returner	Eric Metcalf, Cleveland Browns (PFWA, TSN)	
Special Teams	Steve Tasker, Buffalo Bills (PFWA)	

Defense
Position	First team	Second team
Defensive end	Neil Smith, Kansas City Chiefs (AP, PFWA); Bruce Smith, Buffalo Bills (AP, PFWA, TSN); Reggie White, Green Bay Packers (TSN)	Chris Doleman, Minnesota Vikings (AP-2); Reggie White, Green Bay Packers (AP-2)
Defensive tackle	Cortez Kennedy, Seattle Seahawks (AP, PFWA, TSN); John Randle, Minnesota Vikings (AP, PFWA); Michael Dean Perry, Cleveland Browns (TSN)	Henry Thomas, Minnesota Vikings (AP-2); Michael Dean Perry, Cleveland Browns (AP-2)
Inside linebackers	Hardy Nickerson, Tampa Bay Buccaneers (AP, PFWA, TSN); Junior Seau, San Diego Chargers (AP, PFWA, TSN)	Ken Norton Jr., Dallas Cowboys (AP-2); Michael Brooks, New York Giants (AP-2)
Outside linebacker	Renaldo Turnbull, New Orleans Saints (AP); Greg Lloyd, Pittsburgh Steelers (AP, PFWA); Rickey Jackson, New Orleans Saints (TSN); Seth Joyner, Philadelphia Eagles (PFWA); Darryl Talley, Buffalo Bills (TSN)	Rickey Jackson, New Orleans Saints (AP-2); Derrick Thomas, Kansas City Chiefs (AP-2)
Cornerback	Rod Woodson, Pittsburgh Steelers (AP, PFWA, TSN); Deion Sanders, Atlanta Falcons (AP, PFWA, TSN)	Nate Odomes, Buffalo Bills (AP-2); Eric Allen, Philadelphia Eagles (AP-2)
Safety	Marcus Robertson, Houston Oilers (AP, TSN); LeRoy Butler, Green Bay Packers (AP, TSN); Eugene Robinson, Seattle Seahawks (PFWA)	Eugene Robinson, Seattle Seahawks (AP-2); Tim McDonald, San Francisco 49ers (AP-2)

== Key ==
- AP = Associated Press first-team All-Pro
- AP-2 = Associated Press second-team All-Pro
- PFWA = Pro Football Writers Association All-NFL
- TSN = The Sporting News All-Pro
