= Willie Roaf =

American football player (born 1970)

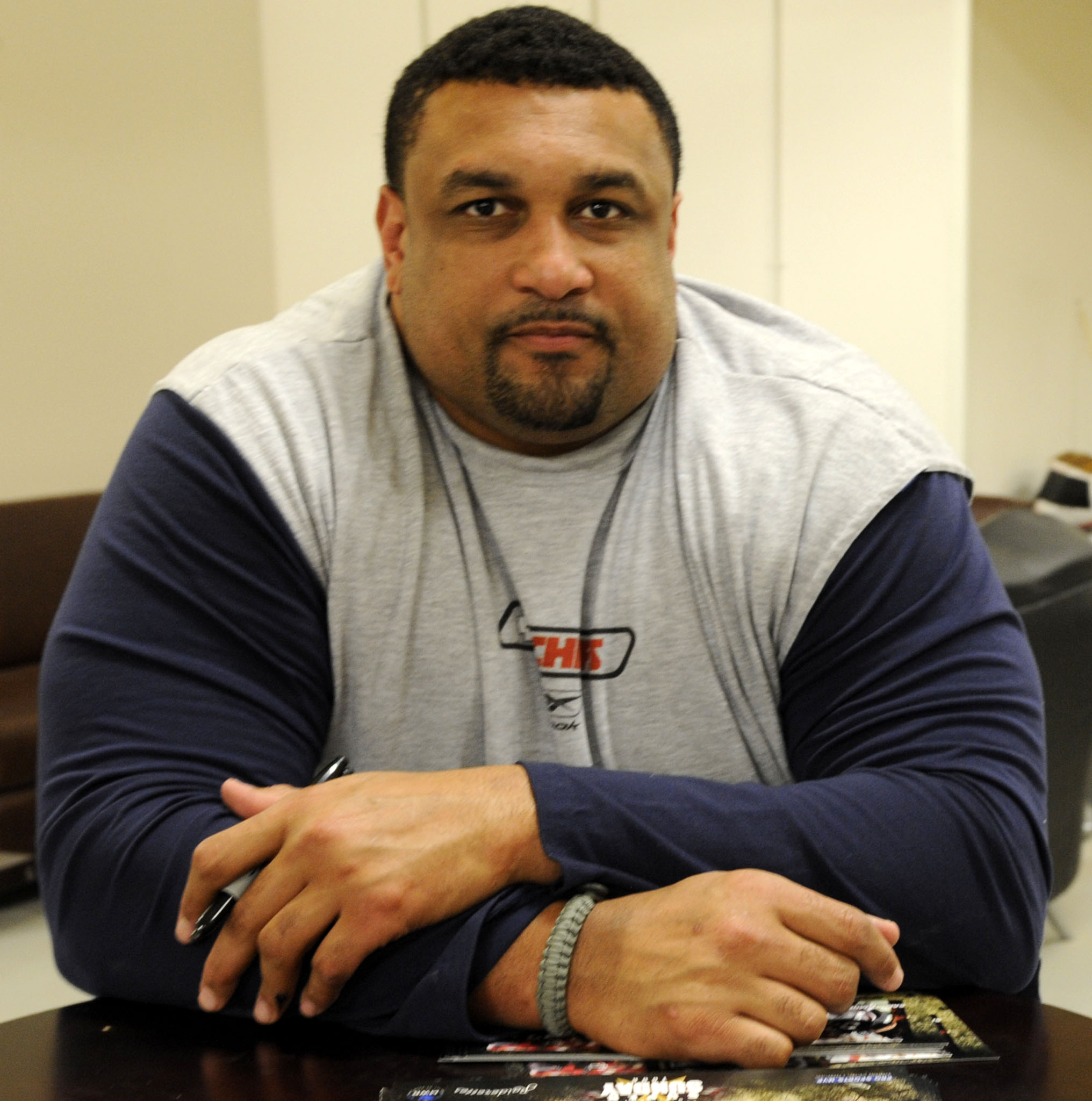
- Roaf in 2008

No. 77
- Position: Offensive tackle

Personal information
- Born: April 18, 1970 (age 56); Pine Bluff, Arkansas, U.S.
- Listed height: 6 ft 5 in (1.96 m)
- Listed weight: 320 lb (145 kg)

Career information
- High school: Pine Bluff
- College: Louisiana Tech (1989–1992)
- NFL draft: 1993: 1st round, 8th overall pick

Career history
- New Orleans Saints (1993–2001); Kansas City Chiefs (2002–2005)

Awards and highlights
- 4× First-team All-Pro (1994, 1995, 2003, 2004); 5× Second-team All-Pro (1996, 1997, 2000, 2002, 2005); 11× Pro Bowl (1994–2000, 2002–2005); NFL 1990s All-Decade Team; NFL 2000s All-Decade Team; PFWA All-Rookie Team (1993); New Orleans Saints Hall of Fame; New Orleans Saints Ring of Honor; Consensus All-American (1992); First-team All-South Independent (1991)

Career NFL statistics
- Games played: 189
- Games started: 189
- Fumble recoveries: 4
- Stats at Pro Football Reference
- Pro Football Hall of Fame
- College Football Hall of Fame

William Layton Roaf (born April 18, 1970), nicknamed "Nasty", is an American former professional football player who was an offensive tackle in the National Football League (NFL) for 13 seasons. He played college football for Louisiana Tech Bulldogs, where he earned consensus All-American honors. He was a first-round pick in the 1993 NFL draft, and played professionally for the New Orleans Saints and Kansas City Chiefs of the NFL. An 11-time Pro Bowl selection and nine-time All-Pro, he was enshrined in the Pro Football Hall of Fame in 2012 and the College Football Hall of Fame in 2014.

== Early life ==
Roaf was born in Pine Bluff, Arkansas. He graduated from Pine Bluff High School, where he played for the Pine Bluff Zebras high school football and basketball teams. He was lightly recruited out of high school, and even considered pursuing basketball instead of football in college.

His father, Clifton George Roaf, was a dentist and his mother, Andree Layton Roaf, was the first black woman to serve on the Arkansas Supreme Court. His sister, Phoebe Alison Roaf, is the bishop of the Episcopal Church in West Tennessee since 2019.

== College career ==
Roaf received an athletic scholarship to attend Louisiana Tech University, where he had an outstanding career for the Bulldogs from 1989 to 1992. Known for his blocking ability and his considerable speed for his size, he was recognized as a consensus first-team All-American, and was also a finalist in his senior year for the Outland Trophy for the best offensive lineman in college. Roaf made appearances in the Hula Bowl and the East–West Shrine Game.

== Professional career ==
Pre-draft measurables
Height	Weight	Arm length	Hand span	40-yard dash	10-yard split	20-yard split	20-yard shuttle	Vertical jump	Broad jump	Bench press
6 ft 4 1/2 in (1.94 m)	308 lb (140 kg)	34 7/8 in (0.89 m)	10 3/4 in (0.27 m)	5.03 s	1.76 s	2.92 s	4.82 s	24.0 in (0.61 m)	9 ft 4 in (2.84 m)	25 reps
All values from NFL Combine

He began his professional football career with the NFL's New Orleans Saints, who selected him with the eighth pick of the first round in the 1993 NFL draft. The draft pick was acquired from the Detroit Lions for the rights to Pat Swilling. Roaf played nine seasons for the Saints; he was named to seven Pro Bowls, and won a spot on both the NFL 1990s All-Decade Team and the 2000s All-Decade Team, making him the most awarded player in Saints history. Roaf suffered a season-ending injury in 2001 and then was traded to the Kansas City Chiefs in March 2002 for a conditional draft choice. He played four more seasons with the Chiefs, and was selected for the Pro Bowl in each of those four years, for a total of 11 Pro Bowl selections. His election to the Pro Football Hall of Fame was announced on February 4, 2012. Roaf played a pivotal role in the run block on the offense with the most rushing touchdowns back to back seasons in NFL history. #1,4 & 5.

On July 28, 2006, Roaf told the Kansas City Star that he was retiring from football. General manager Carl Peterson said he was holding out hoping that Roaf would reverse his decision, but Roaf said he was "solid" on retirement. In 2009 Roaf took his first coaching job, as the offensive line coach at Santa Monica College in Santa Monica, California.

Roaf has been elected to Sports Halls of Fame for Louisiana Tech Athletics (in 2003), Arkansas (in 2007), Louisiana (in 2009), Greater New Orleans (in 2012), and the New Orleans Saints (in 2008). East West Shrine (2018) He was elected to the Pro Football Hall of Fame on February 4, 2012, in his second year of eligibility. Roaf went into the Saints Ring of Honor (2013) Arkansas Black Hall of Fame along with his mother, a legacy inductee. (2013) Roaf was elected to the College Football Hall of Fame in 2014. Roaf is also in the Kansas Chiefs Chiefs Hall of Honor (2011), was an NFL 100th Anniversary Team finalist (2019), and has been inducted to the Missouri Sports Hall of Fame (2022). In 2026, he was named the number 7 player on the Independence Bowl's 50th Anniversary All-Time Team.

== Personal life ==
Roaf has two sisters and one brother. His sister Phoebe Alison Roaf is the Episcopal Bishop for the Diocese of West Tennessee.

Roaf has four children and one step daughter. He is married to Angela Hernandez Roaf.
