= The Top 100: NFL's Greatest Players =

Sports television series

The Top 100: NFL's Greatest Players was a ten-part television series that set out to determine the top 100 greatest NFL players of all time. It was presented by the NFL Network in 2010. The series was based on a list of the top 100 National Football League players of all time, as compiled by a "blue-ribbon" panel assembled by the NFL Network. The members of the panel were current and former NFL coaches, players, executives, and members of the media. Each episode, broadcast each Thursday from September 3 to November 4, 2010, introduced a group of 10 players from the list, with each nominee player presented and advocated for by a separate noteworthy individual in the world of sports and entertainment. It started with the players ranked 100 through 91, and moving up the list each week.

The final episode, premiering on November 4, 2010, introduced the top 10 players of all time according to the panel. Jerry Rice was chosen as the top player of all time, with Jim Brown as the second choice.

== Appearances by team ==
No.	Team
9	Dallas Cowboys
8	Chicago Bears
8	Green Bay Packers
8	Los Angeles/St. Louis Rams
7	Baltimore/Indianapolis Colts
7	Oakland/Los Angeles Raiders
7	Pittsburgh Steelers
5	Cleveland Browns
5	New York Giants
5	San Francisco 49ers
3	Baltimore Ravens
3	Detroit Lions
3	Kansas City Chiefs
3	Minnesota Vikings
3	New England Patriots
3	Philadelphia Eagles
3	San Diego Chargers
2	Buffalo Bills
2	Chicago Cardinals
2	Houston Oilers/Tennessee Titans
2	Miami Dolphins
2	Tampa Bay Buccaneers
2	Washington Redskins
1	Atlanta Falcons
1	Canton Bulldogs
1	Cincinnati Bengals
1	Denver Broncos
1	New York Jets

== See also ==
- NFL Top 100
- List of Pro Football Hall of Fame inductees
- National Football League 75th Anniversary All-Time Team
- National Football League 100th Anniversary All-Time Team
- National Football League All-Decade Teams
