= 1988 Pro Bowl =

National Football League all-star game

1988 NFL Pro Bowl
NFC	AFC
6	15
Head coach: Jerry Burns (Minnesota Vikings)	Head coach: Marty Schottenheimer (Cleveland Browns)
	1	2	3	4	Total
NFC	0	6	0	0	6
AFC	0	7	6	2	15
- Date: February 7, 1988
- Stadium: Aloha Stadium; Honolulu, Hawaii
- MVP: Bruce Smith (Buffalo Bills)
- Referee: Dick Hantak
- Attendance: 50,113

TV in the United States
- Network: ESPN
- Announcers: Mike Patrick & Roy Firestone

The 1988 Pro Bowl was the NFL's 38th annual all-star game which featured the outstanding performers from the 1987 season. The game was played on Sunday, February 7, 1988, at Aloha Stadium in Honolulu, Hawaii before a crowd of 50,113. The final score was AFC 15, NFC 6.

Marty Schottenheimer of the Cleveland Browns led the AFC team against an NFC team coached by Minnesota Vikings head coach Jerry Burns. The referee was Dick Hantak.

Bruce Smith of the Buffalo Bills was named the game's MVP. Players on the winning AFC team received $10,000 apiece while the NFC participants each took home $5,000.

== AFC roster ==
The players representing the AFC were:

=== Offense ===
Position	Starter(s)	Reserve(s)
Quarterback	7 John Elway, Denver	13 Dan Marino, Miami; 7 Jim Kelly, Buffalo; 19 Bernie Kosar, Cleveland
Running back	32 Marcus Allen, L.A. Raiders	29 Eric Dickerson, Indianapolis; 28 Curt Warner, Seattle; 30 Mike Rozier, Houston
Fullback	34 Kevin Mack, Cleveland	
Wide receiver	88 Al Toon, N.Y. Jets; 88 Carlos Carson, Kansas City	80 Steve Largent, Seattle; 86 Stanley Morgan, New England
Tight end	80 Kellen Winslow, San Diego	46 Todd Christensen, L.A. Raiders
Offensive tackle	78 Anthony Muñoz, Cincinnati; 63 Cody Risien, Cleveland	74 Jim Lachey, San Diego; 75 Chris Hinton, Indianapolis
Offensive guard	54 Keith Bishop, Denver; 65 Mike Munchak, Houston	66 Ron Solt, Indianapolis
Center	53 Ray Donaldson, Indianapolis	52 Mike Webster, Pittsburgh

=== Defense ===
Position	Starter(s)	Reserve(s)
Defensive end	74 Howie Long, L. A. Raiders; 73 Bruce Smith, Buffalo	79 Jacob Green, Seattle
Defensive tackle	63 Bill Maas, Kansas City	69 Tim Krumrie, Cincinnati; 79 Bob Golic, Cleveland
Outside linebacker	56 Andre Tippett, New England; 56 Duane Bickett, Indianapolis	57 Clay Matthews Jr., Cleveland
Inside linebacker	77 Karl Mecklenburg, Denver; 50 Fredd Young, Seattle	56 John Offerdahl, Miami
Cornerback	31 Frank Minnifield, Cleveland; 29 Hanford Dixon, Cleveland	29 Albert Lewis, Kansas City
Free safety	20 Deron Cherry, Kansas City	
Strong safety	45 Kenny Easley, Seattle Seahawks	25 Keith Bostic, Houston

=== Special teams ===
Position	Starter(s)	Reserve(s)
Punter	2 Ralf Mojsiejenko, San Diego	
Placekicker	1 Dean Biasucci, Indianapolis	
Kick returner	89 Gerald McNeil, Cleveland	
Special Teamer	89 Steve Tasker, Buffalo	

== NFC roster ==
The players representing the NFC were:

=== Offense ===
Position	Starter(s)	Reserve(s)
Quarterback	16 Joe Montana, San Francisco	15 Neil Lomax, St. Louis
Running back	42 Gerald Riggs, Atlanta	33 Roger Craig, San Francisco; 36 Reuben Mayes, New Orleans; 34 Herschel Walker, Dallas
Fullback	24 Ron Wolfley, St. Louis	
Wide receiver	80 Jerry Rice, San Francisco; 82 Mike Quick, Philadelphia	84 Gary Clark, Washington; 81 Anthony Carter, Minnesota
Tight end	83 Steve Jordan, Minnesota	89 Mark Bavaro, N.Y. Giants; 85 Hoby Brenner, New Orleans
Offensive tackle	65 Gary Zimmerman, Minnesota; 78 Jackie Slater, Los Angeles Rams	67 Luis Sharpe, St. Louis
Offensive guard	79 Bill Fralic, Atlanta; 60 Dennis Harrah, Los Angeles Rams	63 Brad Edelman, New Orleans
Center	63 Jay Hilgenberg, Chicago	56 Doug Smith, Los Angeles Rams

=== Defense ===
Position	Starter(s)	Reserve(s)
Defensive end	92 Reggie White, Philadelphia; 56 Chris Doleman, Minnesota	71 Charles Mann, Washington
Defensive tackle	95 Michael Carter, San Francisco	76 Steve McMichael, Chicago
Outside linebacker	58 Carl Banks, N. Y. Giants; 58 Wilber Marshall, Chicago	56 Lawrence Taylor, N. Y. Giants
Inside linebacker	50 Mike Singletary, Chicago; 53 Harry Carson, N. Y. Giants	55 Scott Studwell, Minnesota; 51 Sam Mills, New Orleans
Cornerback	28 Darrell Green, Washington; 25 Jerry Gray, L. A. Rams	44 Dave Waymer, New Orleans
Free safety	42 Ronnie Lott, San Francisco	
Strong safety	47 Joey Browner, Minnesota	22 Dave Duerson, Chicago

=== Special teams ===
Position	Starter(s)	Reserve(s)
Punter	5 Jim Arnold, Detroit	
Placekicker	7 Morten Andersen, New Orleans Saints	
Kick returner	36 Vai Sikahema, St. Louis	
