= NFL 1980s All-Decade Team =

Official list of the NFL's best players in the 1980s

The NFL 1980s All-Decade Team was chosen by voters of the Pro Football Hall of Fame. The team was composed of outstanding performers in the National Football League in the 1980s. The squad consists of first- and second-team offensive, defensive and special teams units, as well as a first- and second-team head coaches.

Jerry Rice, Anthony Muñoz, and Lawrence Taylor were the only unanimous choices, being named on all 26 ballots. John Hannah was next with 25 votes, followed by Joe Montana at 24½ votes, Walter Payton at 23½ votes, and Ronnie Lott with 23 votes.

Walter Payton, John Hannah, Mike Webster, Ted Hendricks, Jack Lambert, Billy "White Shoes" Johnson, Rick Upchurch, and Chuck Noll had been previously named to the 1970s All-Decade Team. Jerry Rice, Gary Zimmerman, Bruce Smith, Reggie White, Ronnie Lott, Morten Andersen, Gary Anderson, and Sean Landeta were also later named to the 1990s All-Decade Team.

== Offense ==
| * | Elected into the Pro Football Hall of Fame | ¤ | ~ | Hall of Fame Finalist |

| Position | First Team | Votes | Hall of Fame? | Second Team | Votes | Hall of Fame? |
|---|---|---|---|---|---|---|
| Quarterback | Joe Montana* (San Francisco 49ers) | 24½ | Yes | Dan Fouts* (San Diego Chargers) | 1 | Yes |
| Running back | Walter Payton* (Chicago Bears) | 23½ | Yes | Roger Craig* (San Francisco 49ers) | 5 | Yes |
| Running back | Eric Dickerson* (Los Angeles Rams, Indianapolis Colts) | 18 | Yes | John Riggins* (Washington Redskins) | 3 | Yes |
| Wide receiver | Jerry Rice* (San Francisco 49ers) | 26 | Yes | James Lofton* (Green Bay Packers, Los Angeles Raiders, Buffalo Bills) | 2 | Yes |
| Wide receiver | Steve Largent* (Seattle Seahawks) | 22 | Yes | Art Monk* (Washington Redskins) | 2 | Yes |
| Tight end | Kellen Winslow* (San Diego Chargers) | 18½ | Yes | Ozzie Newsome* (Cleveland Browns) | 2 | Yes |
| Tackle | Anthony Muñoz* (Cincinnati Bengals) | 26 | Yes | Gary Zimmerman* (Minnesota Vikings) | 7 | Yes |
| Tackle | Jimbo Covert* (Chicago Bears) | 8 | Yes | Joe Jacoby (Washington Redskins) | 5 | 3 time finalist |
| Guard | John Hannah* (New England Patriots) | 25 | Yes | Bill Fralic (Atlanta Falcons) | 4 | No |
| Guard | Russ Grimm* (Washington Redskins) | 16 | Yes | Mike Munchak* (Houston Oilers) | 3 | Yes |
| Center | Dwight Stephenson* (Miami Dolphins) | 13 | Yes | Mike Webster* (Pittsburgh Steelers, Kansas City Chiefs) | 10 | Yes |

== Defense ==
| Position | First Team | Votes | Hall of Fame? | Second Team | Votes | Hall of Fame? |
|---|---|---|---|---|---|---|
| Defensive end | Reggie White* (Philadelphia Eagles) | 22 | Yes | Lee Roy Selmon (Tampa Bay Buccaneers) | 3 | Yes |
| Defensive end | Howie Long* (Los Angeles Raiders) | 21 | Yes | Bruce Smith* (Buffalo Bills) | 3 | Yes |
| Defensive tackle | Randy White* (Dallas Cowboys) | 22 | Yes | Keith Millard (Minnesota Vikings) | 7 | No |
| Defensive tackle | Dan Hampton* (Chicago Bears) | 12 | Yes | Dave Butz (Washington Redskins) | 3 | No |
| Middle linebacker | Mike Singletary* (Chicago Bears) | 21½ | Yes | Jack Lambert* (Pittsburgh Steelers) | 4 | Yes |
| Outside linebacker | Lawrence Taylor* (New York Giants) | 26 | Yes | Andre Tippett* (New England Patriots) | 6 | Yes |
| Outside linebacker | Ted Hendricks* (Los Angeles Raiders) | 18 | Yes | Carl Banks (New York Giants) | 1 | No |
| Outside linebacker | Ted Hendricks* (Los Angeles Raiders) | 18 | Yes | John Anderson (Green Bay Packers) | 1 | No |
| Cornerback | Mike Haynes* (New England Patriots, Los Angeles Raiders) | 13 | Yes | Frank Minnifield (Cleveland Browns) | 7 | No |
| Cornerback | Mel Blount* (Pittsburgh Steelers) | 9 | Yes | Lester Hayes (Los Angeles Raiders) | 4 | 4 time finalist |
| Safety | Ronnie Lott* (San Francisco 49ers) | 23 | Yes | Deron Cherry (Kansas City Chiefs) | 5 | No |
| Safety | Kenny Easley* (Seattle Seahawks) | 22½ | Yes | Nolan Cromwell (Los Angeles Rams) | 4 | No |
| Safety | Kenny Easley* (Seattle Seahawks) | 22½ | Yes | Joey Browner (Minnesota Vikings) | 4 | No |

== Special teams ==
| Position | First Team | Votes | Hall of Fame? | Second Team | Votes | Hall of Fame? |
|---|---|---|---|---|---|---|
| Kicker | Morten Andersen* (New Orleans Saints) | 12 | Yes | Gary Anderson (Pittsburgh Steelers) | 4 | No |
| Kicker | Morten Andersen* (New Orleans Saints) | 12 | Yes | Eddie Murray (Detroit Lions) | 4 | No |
| Punter | Sean Landeta (New York Giants) | 8 | No | Reggie Roby (Miami Dolphins) | 6 | No |
| Kick Returner | Mike Nelms (Washington Redskins) | 7½ | No | Rick Upchurch (Denver Broncos) | 5 | No |
| Punt Returner | Billy "White Shoes" Johnson (Atlanta Falcons, Washington Redskins) | 13 | No | John Taylor (San Francisco 49ers) | 3 | No |

== Coach ==
| Position | First Team | Votes | Hall of Fame? | Second Team | Votes | Hall of Fame? |
|---|---|---|---|---|---|---|
| Coach | Bill Walsh* (San Francisco 49ers) | 19 | Yes | Chuck Noll* (Pittsburgh Steelers) | 3 | Yes |
