= NFL 2010s All-Decade Team =

Official list of the NFL's best players in the 2010s

The National Football League 2010s All-Decade Team is composed of outstanding performers in the National Football League in the ten years spanning 2010–2019. Only a player or coach's performance during the decade was used as criteria for voting.

Tom Brady, Adrian Peterson, Joe Thomas, Marshal Yanda, J. J. Watt, Aaron Donald, Von Miller, and Justin Tucker were all unanimous selections. Tom Brady, Julius Peppers, Shane Lechler, Devin Hester and Bill Belichick had been previously named to the Pro Football Hall of Fame's 2000s All-Decade Team.

== The team ==
Note 1: Only teams for which a player played in a game from 2010 to 2019 are listed. Teams with whom a player signed but never played or for whom he played only prior to 2010 or after 2019 are not listed.
Note 2: Under "Hall of Fame" if a year is listed, i.e., "e-2026", that is the year player is eligible for the Pro Football Hall of Fame.
Note 3: Players listed as active may include free agents. They will no longer be listed as active if they remain a free agent for an entire season.

^	Elected into the Pro Football Hall of Fame	¤	Finalist information updated through 2026 selection

=== Offense ===
Position	Player	Hall of Fame
Quarterback	Tom Brady* (New England Patriots)	e-2028
Quarterback	Aaron Rodgers (Green Bay Packers)	Active
Running back	Frank Gore (San Francisco 49ers, Indianapolis Colts, Miami Dolphins, Buffalo Bills)	1 time finalist
Running back	Marshawn Lynch (Buffalo Bills, Seattle Seahawks, Oakland Raiders)	No
Running back	LeSean McCoy (Philadelphia Eagles, Buffalo Bills, Kansas City Chiefs)	No
Running back	Adrian Peterson* (Minnesota Vikings, New Orleans Saints, Arizona Cardinals, Washington Redskins, Seattle Seahawks)	e-2027
Wide receiver	Antonio Brown (Pittsburgh Steelers, New England Patriots)	e-2027
Wide receiver	Larry Fitzgerald^ (Arizona Cardinals)	Yes
Wide receiver	Calvin Johnson^ (Detroit Lions)	Yes
Wide receiver	Julio Jones (Atlanta Falcons)	e-2029
Tight end	Rob Gronkowski (New England Patriots)	e-2027
Tight end	Travis Kelce (Kansas City Chiefs)	Active
Flex	Darren Sproles (San Diego Chargers, New Orleans Saints, Philadelphia Eagles)	No
Tackle	Jason Peters (Philadelphia Eagles)	e-2029
Tackle	Tyron Smith (Dallas Cowboys)	e-2030
Tackle	Joe Staley (San Francisco 49ers)	No
Tackle	Joe Thomas*^ (Cleveland Browns)	Yes
Guard	Jahri Evans (New Orleans Saints, Green Bay Packers)	3 time finalist
Guard	Logan Mankins (New England Patriots, Tampa Bay Buccaneers)	No
Guard	Zack Martin (Dallas Cowboys)	e-2030
Guard	Marshal Yanda* (Baltimore Ravens)	2 time finalist
Center	Alex Mack (Cleveland Browns, Atlanta Falcons)	e-2027
Center	Maurkice Pouncey (Pittsburgh Steelers)	No

=== Defense ===
Position	Player	Hall of Fame
Defensive end	Calais Campbell (Arizona Cardinals, Jacksonville Jaguars)	Active
Defensive end	Cameron Jordan (New Orleans Saints)	Active
Defensive end	Julius Peppers^ (Chicago Bears, Green Bay Packers, Carolina Panthers)	Yes
Defensive end	J. J. Watt* (Houston Texans)	e-2028
Defensive tackle	Geno Atkins (Cincinnati Bengals)	No
Defensive tackle	Fletcher Cox (Philadelphia Eagles)	e-2029
Defensive tackle	Aaron Donald* (St. Louis/Los Angeles Rams)	Active
Defensive tackle	Ndamukong Suh (Detroit Lions, Miami Dolphins, Los Angeles Rams, Tampa Bay Buccaneers)	e-2028
Linebacker
Linebacker	Chandler Jones (New England Patriots, Arizona Cardinals)	e-2029
Linebacker	Luke Kuechly^ (Carolina Panthers)	Yes
Linebacker	Khalil Mack (Oakland Raiders, Chicago Bears)	Active
Linebacker	Von Miller* (Denver Broncos)	Active
Linebacker	Bobby Wagner (Seattle Seahawks)	Active
Linebacker	Patrick Willis^ (San Francisco 49ers)	Yes
Cornerback	Patrick Peterson (Arizona Cardinals)	e-2029
Cornerback	Darrelle Revis^ (New York Jets, Tampa Bay Buccaneers, New England Patriots, Kansas City Chiefs)	Yes
Cornerback	Richard Sherman (Seattle Seahawks, San Francisco 49ers)	e-2027
Defensive back	Chris Harris Jr. (Denver Broncos)	e-2028
Defensive back	Tyrann Mathieu (Arizona Cardinals, Houston Texans, Kansas City Chiefs)	e-2030
Safety	Eric Berry (Kansas City Chiefs)	No
Safety	Earl Thomas (Seattle Seahawks, Baltimore Ravens)	No
Safety	Eric Weddle (San Diego Chargers, Baltimore Ravens, Los Angeles Rams)	e-2027

=== Special teams ===
Position	Player	Hall of Fame
Kicker	Stephen Gostkowski (New England Patriots)	No
Kicker	Justin Tucker* (Baltimore Ravens)	e-2030
Punter	Johnny Hekker (St. Louis/Los Angeles Rams)	Active
Punter	Shane Lechler (Oakland Raiders, Houston Texans)	No
Kick returner	Devin Hester^ (Chicago Bears, Atlanta Falcons, Baltimore Ravens, Seattle Seahawks)	Yes
Kick returner	Cordarrelle Patterson (Minnesota Vikings, Oakland Raiders, New England Patriots, Chicago Bears)	e-2030
Punt returner	Tyreek Hill (Kansas City Chiefs)	Active
Punt returner	Darren Sproles (San Diego Chargers, New Orleans Saints, Philadelphia Eagles)	No

=== Coach ===
Position	Name	Hall of Fame
Coach	Bill Belichick (New England Patriots)	1 time finalist
Coach	Pete Carroll (Seattle Seahawks)	e-2028

^{*} -- denotes a unanimous selection
