= NFL 1990s All-Decade Team =

Official list of the NFL's best players in the 1990s

The NFL 1990s All-Decade Team was chosen by voters of the Pro Football Hall of Fame. The team was composed of outstanding performers in the National Football League in the 1990s.

The squad consists of first- and second-team offensive, defensive and special teams units, as well as a first- and second-team head coaches. Only a person's performance in the 1990s was used as criteria for voting.

Bruce Matthews, Jerry Rice, Barry Sanders, Bruce Smith and Reggie White were unanimous choices. Deion Sanders and Mel Gray were the only players to make the team at two positions. Sanders was named first-team cornerback and punt returner while Gray made the second team as both a kick and punt returner. Morten Andersen, Gary Anderson, Sean Landeta, Ronnie Lott, Gary Zimmerman, Jerry Rice, Bruce Smith, and Reggie White were first named to the 1980s All-Decade Team. Larry Allen, Warren Sapp, and Willie Roaf were also named to the 2000s All-Decade Team.

== Offense ==
*	Elected into the Pro Football Hall of Fame	¤	Finalist information updated through 2025 selection

Position	First Team	Hall of Fame?	Second Team	Hall of Fame?
Quarterback	John Elway* (Denver Broncos)	Yes	Brett Favre* (Green Bay Packers)	Yes
Running back	Barry Sanders* (Detroit Lions)	Yes	Thurman Thomas* (Buffalo Bills)	Yes
Running back	Emmitt Smith* (Dallas Cowboys)	Yes	Terrell Davis* (Denver Broncos)	Yes
Wide receiver	Jerry Rice* (San Francisco 49ers)	Yes	Michael Irvin* (Dallas Cowboys)	Yes
Wide receiver	Cris Carter* (Minnesota Vikings)	Yes	Tim Brown* (Los Angeles / Oakland Raiders)	Yes
Tight end	Shannon Sharpe* (Denver Broncos)	Yes	Ben Coates (New England Patriots)	No
Tackle	Willie Roaf* (New Orleans Saints)	Yes	Tony Boselli* (Jacksonville Jaguars)	Yes
Tackle	Gary Zimmerman* (Minnesota Vikings, Denver Broncos)	Yes	Richmond Webb (Miami Dolphins)	No
Guard	Bruce Matthews* (Houston / Tennessee Oilers / Titans)	Yes	Larry Allen* (Dallas Cowboys)	Yes
Guard	Randall McDaniel* (Minnesota Vikings)	Yes	Steve Wisniewski (Los Angeles / Oakland Raiders)	No
Center	Dermontti Dawson* (Pittsburgh Steelers)	Yes	Mark Stepnoski (Dallas Cowboys, Houston / Tennessee Oilers)	No

== Defense ==
Position	First Team	Hall of Fame?	Second Team	Hall of Fame?
Defensive end	Bruce Smith* (Buffalo Bills)	Yes	Chris Doleman* (Minnesota Vikings, Atlanta Falcons, San Francisco 49ers)	Yes
Defensive end	Reggie White* (Philadelphia Eagles, Green Bay Packers)	Yes	Neil Smith (Kansas City Chiefs, Denver Broncos)	No
Defensive tackle	Cortez Kennedy* (Seattle Seahawks)	Yes	Warren Sapp* (Tampa Bay Buccaneers)	Yes
Defensive tackle	John Randle* (Minnesota Vikings)	Yes	Bryant Young* (San Francisco 49ers)	Yes
Linebacker	Junior Seau* (San Diego Chargers)	Yes	Hardy Nickerson (Pittsburgh Steelers, Tampa Bay Buccaneers)	No
Linebacker	Derrick Thomas* (Kansas City Chiefs)	Yes	Cornelius Bennett (Buffalo Bills, Atlanta Falcons, Indianapolis Colts)	No
Linebacker	Kevin Greene* (Los Angeles Rams, Pittsburgh Steelers, Carolina Panthers, San Francisco 49ers)	Yes	Levon Kirkland (Pittsburgh Steelers)	No
Cornerback	Deion Sanders* (Atlanta Falcons, San Francisco 49ers, Dallas Cowboys)	Yes	Darrell Green* (Washington Redskins)	Yes
Cornerback	Rod Woodson* (Pittsburgh Steelers, San Francisco 49ers, Baltimore Ravens)	Yes	Aeneas Williams* (Phoenix / Arizona Cardinals)	Yes
Safety	Steve Atwater* (Denver Broncos, New York Jets)	Yes	Carnell Lake (Pittsburgh Steelers, Jacksonville Jaguars)	No
Safety	LeRoy Butler* (Green Bay Packers)	Yes	Ronnie Lott* (San Francisco 49ers, Los Angeles Raiders, New York Jets)	Yes

== Special teams ==
Position	First Team	Hall of Fame?	Second Team	Hall of Fame?
Kicker	Morten Andersen* (New Orleans Saints, Atlanta Falcons)	Yes	Gary Anderson (Pittsburgh Steelers, Philadelphia Eagles, San Francisco 49ers, Minnesota Vikings)	No
Punter	Darren Bennett (San Diego Chargers)	No	Sean Landeta (New York Giants, Los Angeles / St. Louis Rams, Tampa Bay Buccaneers, Green Bay Packers, Philadelphia Eagles)	No
Kick Returner	Michael Bates (Seattle Seahawks, Cleveland Browns, Carolina Panthers)	No	Mel Gray (New Orleans Saints, Detroit Lions, Houston / Tennessee Oilers, Philadelphia Eagles)	No
Punt Returner	Deion Sanders* (Atlanta Falcons, San Francisco 49ers, Dallas Cowboys)	Yes	Mel Gray (New Orleans Saints, Detroit Lions, Houston / Tennessee Oilers, Philadelphia Eagles)	No

== Coach ==
Position	First Team	Hall of Fame?	Second Team	Hall of Fame?
Coach	Bill Parcells* (New York Giants, New England Patriots, New York Jets)	Yes	Marv Levy* (Buffalo Bills)	Yes
