= NFL 2000s All-Decade Team =

Official list of the NFL's best players in the 2000s

THE NFL 2000s All-Decade Team is composed of outstanding performers in the National Football League in the ten years spanning 2000–2009. Only a player or coach's performance in the 2000s is used as criteria for voting.

The full team was announced on January 31, 2010 during the pregame show for the 2010 Pro Bowl. The names of the twelve all-decade honorees who participated in the 2010 Pro Bowl had been released earlier in the week.

Willie Roaf, Larry Allen, and Warren Sapp were previously named to the 1990s All-Decade Team. Tom Brady, Julius Peppers, Shane Lechler, Devin Hester and Bill Belichick were later named to the 2010s All-Decade Team.

== Selection process ==
The team is chosen by members of the Hall of Fame Selection Committee. This committee consists of one media member from each NFL market (two for New York/New Jersey owing to the market's two teams), a representative from the Pro Football Writers of America and 11 "at-large" delegates (primarily national sportswriters) for a total of 44 voters. These voters are asked to select two coaches and a total of 54 players, broken out as follows: two quarterbacks, four running backs, two fullbacks, four wide receivers, two tight ends, four offensive tackles, four guards, two centers, four defensive ends, four defensive tackles, six linebackers, four cornerbacks, four safeties, two placekickers, two punters, two kick returners, two punt returners.

Among the voters who have revealed their individual selections for the team are Alex Marvez (Fox Sports), Rick Gosselin (The Dallas Morning News), and Peter King (Sports Illustrated).

== The team ==
Note 1: Players are listed alphabetically within first and second teams
Note 2: Only teams for which a player played in a game from 2000–2009 are listed. Teams with whom a player signed but never played or for whom he played only prior to 2000 or after 2009 are not listed.
Note 3: Under "Hall of Fame?" if a year is listed, i.e., "e-2022", that is the year player is eligible for the Pro Football Hall of Fame.

=== Offense ===
^	Elected into the Pro Football Hall of Fame	¤	Finalist information updated through 2026 selection

Position	First Team	Hall of Fame?	Second Team	Hall of Fame?
Quarterback	Tom Brady (New England Patriots)	e-2028	Peyton Manning^ (Indianapolis Colts)	Yes
Running back	Edgerrin James^ (Indianapolis Colts, Arizona Cardinals, Seattle Seahawks)	Yes	Shaun Alexander (Seattle Seahawks, Washington Redskins)	No
Running back	LaDainian Tomlinson^ (San Diego Chargers)	Yes	Jamal Lewis (Baltimore Ravens, Cleveland Browns)	No
Fullback	Lorenzo Neal (Tennessee Titans, Cincinnati Bengals, San Diego Chargers, Baltimore Ravens)	No	Tony Richardson (Kansas City Chiefs, Minnesota Vikings, New York Jets)	No
Wide receiver	Marvin Harrison^ (Indianapolis Colts)	Yes	Torry Holt (St. Louis Rams, Jacksonville Jaguars)	7 time finalist
Wide receiver	Randy Moss^ (Minnesota Vikings, Oakland Raiders, New England Patriots)	Yes	Terrell Owens^ (San Francisco 49ers, Philadelphia Eagles, Dallas Cowboys, Buffalo Bills)	Yes
Tight end	Tony Gonzalez^ (Kansas City Chiefs, Atlanta Falcons)	Yes	Antonio Gates (San Diego Chargers)	Yes
Tackle	Walter Jones^ (Seattle Seahawks)	Yes	Orlando Pace^ (St. Louis Rams, Chicago Bears)	Yes
Tackle	Jonathan Ogden^ (Baltimore Ravens)	Yes	Willie Roaf^ (New Orleans Saints, Kansas City Chiefs)	Yes
Guard	Alan Faneca^ (Pittsburgh Steelers, New York Jets)	Yes	Larry Allen^ (Dallas Cowboys, San Francisco 49ers)	Yes
Guard	Steve Hutchinson^ (Seattle Seahawks, Minnesota Vikings)	Yes	Will Shields^ (Kansas City Chiefs)	Yes
Center	Kevin Mawae^ (Seattle Seahawks, New York Jets, Tennessee Titans)	Yes	Olin Kreutz (Chicago Bears)	No

=== Defense ===
Position	First Team	Hall of Fame?	Second Team	Hall of Fame?
Defensive end	Dwight Freeney^ (Indianapolis Colts)	Yes	Julius Peppers^ (Carolina Panthers)	Yes
Defensive end	Michael Strahan^ (New York Giants)	Yes	Jason Taylor^ (Miami Dolphins, Washington Redskins)	Yes
Defensive tackle	Warren Sapp^ (Tampa Bay Buccaneers, Oakland Raiders)	Yes	La'Roi Glover (New Orleans Saints, Dallas Cowboys, St. Louis Rams)	No
Defensive tackle	Richard Seymour^ (New England Patriots, Oakland Raiders)	Yes	Kevin Williams (Minnesota Vikings)	1 time finalist
Linebacker	Derrick Brooks^ (Tampa Bay Buccaneers)	Yes	Joey Porter (Pittsburgh Steelers, Miami Dolphins)	No
Linebacker	Ray Lewis^ (Baltimore Ravens)	Yes	Zach Thomas^ (Miami Dolphins, Dallas Cowboys)	Yes
Linebacker	Brian Urlacher^ (Chicago Bears)	Yes	DeMarcus Ware^ (Dallas Cowboys)	Yes
Cornerback	Champ Bailey^ (Washington Redskins, Denver Broncos)	Yes	Ronde Barber^ (Tampa Bay Buccaneers)	Yes
Cornerback	Charles Woodson^ (Oakland Raiders, Green Bay Packers)	Yes	Ty Law^ (New England Patriots, New York Jets, Kansas City Chiefs, Denver Broncos)	Yes
Safety	Brian Dawkins^ (Philadelphia Eagles, Denver Broncos)	Yes	Troy Polamalu^ (Pittsburgh Steelers)	Yes
Safety	Ed Reed^ (Baltimore Ravens)	Yes	Darren Sharper (Green Bay Packers, Minnesota Vikings, New Orleans Saints)	No

=== Special teams ===
Position	First Team	Hall of Fame?	Second Team	Hall of Fame?
Kicker	Adam Vinatieri (New England Patriots, Indianapolis Colts)	Yes	David Akers (Philadelphia Eagles)	No
Punter	Shane Lechler (Oakland Raiders)	No	Brian Moorman (Buffalo Bills)	No
Kick Returner	Josh Cribbs (Cleveland Browns)	No	Dante Hall (Kansas City Chiefs, St. Louis Rams)	No
Punt Returner	Dante Hall (Kansas City Chiefs, St. Louis Rams)	No	Devin Hester^ (Chicago Bears)	Yes

=== Coach ===
Position	First Team	Hall of Fame?	Second Team	Hall of Fame?
Coach	Bill Belichick (New England Patriots)	1 time finalist	Tony Dungy^ (Tampa Bay Buccaneers, Indianapolis Colts)	Yes

== See also ==
- Sports Illustrated NFL All-Decade Team (2009)
