= List of Cleveland Browns Pro Bowl selections =

This is a list of Cleveland Browns players who were elected to the Pro Bowl.

The year indicates when the game was played, not the season that it followed.

== 1951–1995 ==
Year	Player
1951	Otto Graham
1951	Lou Groza
1951	Bill Willis
1951	Mac Speedie
1951	Marion Motley
1951	Tony Adamle
1951	Weldon Humble
1952	Tony Adamle
1952	Otto Graham
1952	Ken Carpenter
1952	Len Ford
1952	Lou Groza
1952	Dub Jones
1952	Dante Levelli
1952	Bill Willis
1953	Len Ford
1953	Abe Gibron
1953	Horace Gillom
1953	Bill Willis
1953	Otto Graham
1953	Lou Groza
1954	Len Ford
1954	Abe Gibron
1954	Otto Graham
1954	Lou Groza
1954	Harry Jagade
1954	Tommy James
1954	Dante Lavelli
1954	Ray Renfro
1955	Don Colo
1955	Len Ford
1955	Frank Gatski
1955	Abe Gibron
1955	Otto Graham
1955	Lou Groza
1955	Ken Konz
1955	Dante Lavelli
1956	Darrel Brewster
1956	Don Colo
1956	Abe Gibron
1956	Lou Groza
1956	Ken Konz
1956	Fred Morrison
1957	Darrel Brewster
1957	Mike McCormack
1957	Walt Michaels
1957	Don Paul
1958	Jim Brown
1958	Bob Gain
1958	Lou Groza
1958	Mike McCormack
1958	Walt Michaels
1958	Don Paul
1958	Ray Renfro
1959	Jim Brown
1959	Don Colo
1959	Bob Gain
1959	Lou Groza
1959	Walt Michaels
1959	Don Paul
1959	Jim Ray Smith
1960	Jim Brown
1960	Bob Gain
1960	Lou Groza
1960	Art Hunter
1960	Walt Michaels
1960	Jim Ray Smith
1961	Jim Brown
1961	Mike McCormack
1961	Bobby Mitchell
1961	Bernie Parrish
1961	Milt Plum
1961	Ray Renfro
1961	Jim Ray Smith
1962	Jim Brown
1962	Bob Gain
1962	Mike McCormack
1962	John Morrow
1962	Milt Plum
1962	Jim Ray Smith
1963	Jim Brown
1963	Galen Fiss
1963	Bob Gain
1963	Bill Glass
1963	Mike McCormack
1963	Jim Ray Smith
1964	Jim Brown
1964	Galen Fiss
1964	Bill Glass
1964	John Morrow
1964	Bernie Parrish
1964	Dick Schafrath
1965	Jim Brown
1965	Bill Glass
1965	Jim Houston
1965	Dick Medzelewski
1965	Frank Ryan
1965	Dick Schafrath
1965	Paul Warfield
1966	Jim Brown
1966	Gary Collins
1966	Gene Hickerson
1966	Jim Houston
1966	Frank Ryan
1966	Dick Schafrath
1966	Paul Wiggin
1966	John Wooten
1967	Johnny Brewer
1967	Gary Collins
1967	Ernie Green
1967	Gene Hickerson
1967	Leroy Kelly
1967	Milt Morin
1967	Dick Schafrath
1967	Paul Wiggin
1968	Bill Glass
1968	Ernie Green
1968	Gene Hickerson
1968	Walter Johnson
1968	Leroy Kelly
1968	Milt Morin
1968	Dick Schafrath
1968	Paul Wiggin
1969	Erich Barnes
1969	Gene Hickerson
1969	Walter Johnson
1969	Ernie Kellermann
1969	Leroy Kelly
1969	Milt Morin
1969	Dick Schafrath
1969	Paul Warfield
1970	Jack Gregory
1970	Gene Hickerson
1970	Fred Hoaglin
1970	Jim Houston
1970	Walter Johnson
1970	Leroy Kelly
1970	Bill Nelsen
1970	Paul Warfield
1971	Gene Hickerson
1971	Jim Houston
1971	Leroy Kelly
1972	Leroy Kelly
1972	Milt Morin
1974	Greg Pruitt
1974	Clarence Scott
1974	Jerry Sherk
1975	Greg Pruitt
1975	Jerry Sherk
1976	Jerry Sherk
1977	Greg Pruitt
1977	Jerry Sherk
1978	Greg Pruitt
1979	Thom Darden
1980	Tom DeLeone
1980	Mike Pruitt
1981	Joe DeLemielleure
1981	Tom DeLeone
1981	Doug Dieken
1981	Mike Pruitt
1981	Brian Sipe
1982	Ozzie Newsome
1983	Chip Banks
1984	Chip Banks
1985	Ozzie Newsome
1986	Chip Banks
1986	Bob Golic
1986	Kevin Mack
1986	Clay Matthews
1986	Ozzie Newsome
1987	Chip Banks
1987	Hanford Dixon
1987	Bob Golic
1987	Frank Minnifield
1987	Cody Risien
1988	Hanford Dixon
1988	Bob Golic
1988	Bernie Kosar
1988	Kevin Mack
1988	Clay Matthews
1988	Gerald McNeil
1988	Frank Minnifield
1988	Cody Risien
1989	Hanford Dixon
1989	Clay Matthews
1989	Frank Minnifield
1990	Mike Johnson
1990	Clay Matthews
1990	Frank Minnifield
1990	Michael Dean Perry
1990	Webster Slaughter
1991	Mike Johnson
1991	Michael Dean Perry
1992	Michael Dean Perry
1994	Eric Metcalf
1994	Michael Dean Perry
1995	Rob Bernett
1995	Leroy Hoard
1995	Pepper Johnson
1995	Eric Metcalf
1995	Michael Dean Perry
1995	Eric Turner

The Cleveland Browns were inactive during the 1996, 1997, and 1998 NFL seasons.

== 1999–present ==
From the reactivation of the Browns franchise in 1999 to the present

Year	Player	Position
2002	Jamir Miller	LB
2008	Derek Anderson	QB
2008	Braylon Edwards	WR
2008	Kellen Winslow II	TE
2008	Ryan Pontbriand	LS
2008	Joe Thomas	OT
2008	Josh Cribbs	KR
2009	Joe Thomas	OT
2009	Shaun Rogers	DT
2009	Ryan Pontbriand	LS
2010	Joe Thomas	OT
2010	Josh Cribbs	KR
2011	Joe Thomas	OT
2011	Alex Mack	C
2012	Joe Thomas	OT
2013	Joe Thomas	OT
2013	Phil Dawson	K
2014	Joe Thomas	OT
2014	Josh Gordon	WR
2014	Jordan Cameron	TE
2014	Alex Mack	C
2014	Joe Haden	CB
2014	T. J. Ward	S
2015	Joe Thomas	OT
2015	Joe Haden	CB
2015	Donte Whitner	S
2015	Tashaun Gipson	S
2016	Joe Thomas	OT
2016	Gary Barnidge	TE
2016	Alex Mack	C
2017	Joe Thomas	OT
2018	Joe Schobert	LB
2019	Myles Garrett	DE
2019	Denzel Ward	CB
2019	Jarvis Landry	WR
2019	Joel Bitonio	G
2020	Joel Bitonio	G
2020	Nick Chubb	RB
2020	Jarvis Landry	WR
2021	Joel Bitonio	G
2021	Nick Chubb	RB
2021	Myles Garrett	DE
2022	Joel Bitonio	G
2022	Nick Chubb	RB
2022	Myles Garrett	DE
2022	Denzel Ward	CB
2022	Wyatt Teller	G
2023	Joel Bitonio	G
2023	Nick Chubb	RB
2023	Myles Garrett	DE
2023	Wyatt Teller	G
2024	Joel Bitonio	G
2024	Amari Cooper	WR
2024	Myles Garrett	DE
2024	David Njoku	TE
2024	Jeremiah Owusu-Koramoah	LB
2024	Wyatt Teller	G
2024	Denzel Ward	CB
2025	Jerry Jeudy	WR
2025	Myles Garrett	DE
2025	Denzel Ward	CB
2026	Shedeur Sanders	QB
2026	Myles Garrett	DE
2026	Denzel Ward	CB
