= Tony Adamle =

American football player (1924–2000)

- Adamle on a 1951 football card

No. 74, 54
- Positions: Linebacker, fullback

Personal information
- Born: May 15, 1924; Fairmont, West Virginia, U.S.
- Died: October 7, 2000 (aged 76); Kent, Ohio, U.S.
- Listed height: 6 ft 0 in (1.83 m)
- Listed weight: 215 lb (98 kg)

Career information
- High school: Collinwood (Cleveland, Ohio)
- College: Ohio State (1942, 1946)
- NFL draft: 1947: 12th round, 105th overall pick

Career history
- Chicago Bears (1947)*; Cleveland Browns (1947-1951, 1954)
- * Offseason or practice squad member only

Awards and highlights
- 3× AAFC champion (1947, 1948, 1949); 2× NFL champion (1950, 1954); First-team All-Pro (1951); 2× Pro Bowl (1950, 1951); Cleveland Browns Legends

Career NFL/AAFC statistics
- Rushing yards: 255
- Rushing average: 4.3
- Receptions: 2
- Receiving yards: 35
- Interceptions: 7
- Fumble recoveries: 6
- Stats at Pro Football Reference

Anthony Adamle (May 15, 1924 – October 7, 2000) was an American professional football player who was a linebacker and fullback in the All-America Football Conference (AAFC) and the National Football League (NFL). He played his entire career for the Cleveland Browns before retiring to pursue a medical degree.

Adamle grew up in Cleveland, Ohio, and was a star fullback on his Collinwood High School football team. He attended Ohio State University in 1942, but his college career was cut short by World War II. After a stint in the United States Army Air Force, Adamle returned to finish his education at Ohio State in 1946. He soon dropped out of school, however, and joined the Browns. Cleveland won AAFC championships in each of Adamle's first three years, after which the league folded and the Browns were absorbed by the more established NFL. Cleveland continued to succeed in the NFL, winning the 1950 championship and advancing to the 1951 championship but losing to the Los Angeles Rams. Adamle left the Browns after the 1951 season to pursue a medical degree, but he came out of retirement briefly in 1954 as the Browns won another NFL championship.

Adamle left football for good after the season, earning a medical degree from Western Reserve University in Cleveland in 1956. He settled with his family in Kent, Ohio, where he ran a medical practice until his death in 2000. He was a team physician for his local high school and for Kent State University for more than 35 years. Adamle's son Mike played in the NFL as a fullback in the 1970s before retiring and becoming a sports broadcaster.

== Early life ==
Adamle was born in Fairmont, West Virginia, to immigrants from Slovenia. His family moved to Cleveland when he was a child, and he attended Collinwood High School on the city's east side. Adamle was a standout fullback on his high school team and made a Cleveland-area All-Star squad in 1941 that matched up against a team of stars from Florida. He was "without question the best high school player I have ever seen," one Cleveland sports editor said after he was chosen as an all-star. He was also named an All-Ohio player by the Associated Press and United Press International and earned three varsity letters in football in high school.

== College and military career ==
Adamle attended Ohio State University and was on the 1942 Ohio State Buckeyes freshman team, but left school prior to the 1943 season to fight in World War II. After serving in the U.S. Air Force in the Mediterranean Theatre of War, he returned to Ohio State for the team's 1946 season—his only season with the varsity Buckeyes. Playing as a center in a November game against the Northwestern Wildcats, Adamle intercepted a Frank Aschenbrenner pass in the third quarter and returned it 38 yards. He had another interception in the fourth quarter of the 39–27 Buckeyes victory. Ohio State finished the season with a 4–3–2 record and Adamle was selected to play in the College All-Star Game, a now-defunct matchup between the National Football League (NFL) champion and a selection of the best college players from around the country.

== Professional career ==
Adamle was eligible to play for the Buckeyes again in 1947, but decided to leave school and join the Cleveland Browns of the All-America Football Conference (AAFC). Adamle had been selected with the 105th pick in the 1947 NFL draft by the Chicago Bears, and he told Cleveland head coach Paul Brown, who coached Ohio State's varsity team between 1941 and 1943, that he would join the Bears if the Browns did not sign him. "I would be a pretty sick fellow today, knowing what I do about Tony, if George Halas had gotten him," Brown said before the season began.

Adamle's decision to drop out was controversial because of rules that under normal circumstances would have barred him from playing professionally before graduating. The interruption of the war had forced the suspension of the rule to account for players' military service, however, and he was allowed to leave college. The Browns denied that they encouraged Adamle to drop out. Adamle may have been convinced to join the Browns by Gene Fekete, Dante Lavelli, Lou Groza and Bill Willis, four Browns players who were back at Ohio State to finish their studies after the 1946 season.

With the Browns starting in the team's 1947 season, Adamle played as a fullback. He competed with Marion Motley at the position, and said he was "not working to be a second-stringer". Adamle was a straight-talker and was not afraid to stand up to Brown, a cold disciplinarian who was the team's coach between 1946 and 1962. Brown was impressed with Adamle's candor and held him in respect. Before the seventh game of the 1947 season, a matchup against the Chicago Rockets that October, Adamle replaced Motley as the team's starting fullback. Brown said that while he had not given up on Motley, a big back who had anchored the offense in the Browns' early years, the former starter had "made a few mistakes lately that hurt us" and thought competition would be helpful. Adamle, who was about 15 pounds lighter than Motley, started for a brief time as part of an offense led by quarterback Otto Graham, registering 23 carries for 95 yards on the season, a career-high. The Browns went on to finish the 1947 season with a 12–1–1 record and win the AAFC championship game against the New York Yankees. Adamle returned to Ohio State in the offseason to continue his studies.

By the team's following season, Adamle was being used mostly on defense as a left-side linebacker, and Motley was again the primary fullback. Cleveland had a perfect season in 1948, winning all of its games and beating the Buffalo Bills in the championship. Adamle had 88 rushing yards and a touchdown that year.

Adamle filled in for an injured Motley at fullback for several games the following year while continuing to play as a linebacker. He had 64 rushing yards and made four interceptions, a career-high. Cleveland again won the AAFC championship in 1949, but the league then folded and the Browns were absorbed by the more established NFL.

Cleveland's success continued in the NFL in its 1950 season as Adamle was named team captain, replacing Lou Saban following his retirement. The team won the 1950 NFL Championship Game, and Adamale was one of seven Browns players chosen to play in the first Pro Bowl, football's all-star game. He led the NFL with five fumble recoveries that year and was also named a second-team All-Pro by the New York Daily News.

Adamle was again one of eight Browns chosen for the Pro Bowl after Cleveland's 1951 season, when the team reached the championship game but lost to the Los Angeles Rams. He was named a first-team All-Pro by United Press International and the New York Daily News after the season, when he had one interception and one fumble recovery. He was used mainly as an outside linebacker in Cleveland's 5-3 defense later in his career, only attempting three rushes in the 1950s. Adamle finished college at Kent State University in 1950, earning a bachelor's degree, and received a master's degree in education from Western Reserve University in Cleveland in 1951.

Upset by Brown's criticisms of the defense in the 1951 championship game, Adamle left the Browns before the next season to enter medical school. Brown nevertheless traded the rights to Adamle to the Green Bay Packers as part of a deal that brought defensive back Ace Loomis to Cleveland. "We know Adamle is determined to enter medical school and informed the Packers it is very unlikely he would play any more football," Brown said. The Packers hoped to get him to play part-time while he was in school. Adamle spent most of 1952 working as an orderly at Glenville Hospital in Cleveland, entering Western Reserve's medical school in September.

Adamle came out of retirement to play for the Browns at 30 years old in October 1954. He had been working as a scout for the Chicago Cardinals and was in his third year of medical school; he agreed to come back on the condition that he would only practice once a week so he could continue his studies. The Browns had advanced to the NFL championship game in both of the seasons he did not play, but lost both times to the Detroit Lions. In Cleveland's 1954 season, the team reached the championship game and beat the Lions, 56–10.

== Medical career ==
Adamle quit football for good after the season and focused on his medical career. In 1956, he received his medical degree from Western Reserve in Cleveland, now known as Case Western Reserve University. He settled in Kent, Ohio, where he ran a medical practice for the rest of his life. He also served as the team doctor for Theodore Roosevelt High School and Kent State University for more than 35 years. Adamle specialized in knee and neck injuries, and published articles about cold therapy and the use of Vitamin C in sports medicine. The Ohio High School Athletic Association named him the state's Outstanding Team Physician in 1983.

== Later life and death ==
Adamle died in 2000 after a seven-year battle with cancer. His son, Mike Adamle, was a running back at Roosevelt High School and Northwestern University, and played professionally as a fullback for the Kansas City Chiefs, New York Jets and Chicago Bears in the 1970s before becoming a sports broadcaster.
