= Horace Gillom =

American football player (1921–1985)

- Gillom on a 1951 football card

No. 59, 84
- Positions: Punter, end

Personal information
- Born: March 3, 1921; Roanoke, Alabama, U.S.
- Died: October 28, 1985 (aged 64); Los Angeles, California, U.S.
- Listed height: 6 ft 1 in (1.85 m)
- Listed weight: 221 lb (100 kg)

Career information
- High school: Massillon Washington (Massillon, Ohio)
- College: Ohio State, Nevada

Career history
- Cleveland Browns (1947–1956)

Awards and highlights
- 3× NFL champion (1950, 1954, 1955); 3× AAFC champion (1947–1949); Pro Bowl (1952); Cleveland Browns Legends; First-team All-PCC (1946)

Career statistics
- Punts: 492
- Punting yards: 21,206
- Punting average: 43.8
- Stats at Pro Football Reference

Horace Albert "Big Horse" Gillom (March 3, 1921 – October 28, 1985) was an American professional football player who was a punter and end in the All-America Football Conference (AAFC) and National Football League (NFL). He played ten seasons for the Cleveland Browns between 1947 and 1956. Horace Gillom became the first African American punter in NFL history. Cleveland head coach Paul Brown, who coached Gillom in high school, college and professionally, called him his best all-around high school player and once said there "has never been a better punter than Horace".

Growing up in Ohio, Gillom played for Brown on the football team at Massillon Washington High School, where he excelled as an end, linebacker and punter. In Gillom's three seasons between 1938 and 1940, Massillon won all of its games and captured two High School Football National Championships. Gillom followed Brown to Ohio State University in 1941, playing on the school's freshman football team before dropping out because of poor grades. He then entered the U.S. Army and served for three years in World War II. Upon his discharge, Gillom enrolled at the University of Nevada, Reno to finish his college career. He led the country in scoring in 1946 but left the school after the season, again because of poor grades.

Gillom signed with the Browns, an AAFC team coached by Brown, in 1947. He handled all of the team's punting chores and played as a utility end on both offense and defense. Gillom's Cleveland teams won three straight AAFC championships before the league dissolved and the Browns were absorbed by the NFL. The Browns won the NFL championship in 1950 and repeated in 1954 and 1955. Gillom was a consistent punter, never averaging below 41.2 yards per kick in a season. His abilities declined in his later years, however, and he was released during the 1956 season. Gillom attempted a comeback in 1961 with the New York Titans of the American Football League, but failed to make the team. He moved to Los Angeles and worked as a security guard for the rest of his life. Gillom died of a heart attack in 1985. He was named in 2007 as a Cleveland Browns Legend, a grouping of the team's best-ever players.

Gillom contributed to the evolution of punting by standing further back from the center than was usual at the time to give himself more room to make kicks. His kicks were also high, which gave the coverage team more time to get down the field and stop punt returns. Gillom's distance from center and emphasis on hang time were followed by later generations of punters.

== Early life ==
Gillom grew up in Massillon, Ohio and attended Massillon Washington High School. He was a star end on the Massillon football team like his older brother Odell, but was also a linebacker and punter. Bud Houghton, who coached him when he was in junior high school, said Gillom needed a step and a half more than usual to get his punts off, but he was the best he had ever seen once he made the kick. Houghton moved Gillom 15 yards behind the snapper instead of the usual 10, which gave him the room he needed. Gillom was a favorite of Massillon High football coach Paul Brown, who said in his autobiography that there "has never been a better punter than Horace."

Gillom played for the Massillon Tigers between 1938 and 1940, a period during which the team won all of its games and two High School Football National Championships. Gillom, who also played basketball and other sports, earned All-Ohio honors at Massillon and was one of several black players on the team at a time when many northern high schools excluded them. Brown's policy was to use his best players, regardless of race. Gillom set school records for points scored in a season and touchdown passes caught in a season. His record of 108 points in a season still stands.

== College and military service ==
Brown became Ohio State's head football coach in 1941 and recruited Gillom to the school. Gillom played on Ohio State's freshman team that year as an end opposite Dante Lavelli. Gillom was expected to move up to the varsity team the following year as a blocking back, but was kicked out of school in January for failing to maintain his grades. Brown later said Gillom did not fail any courses and was back at Ohio State doing "some extra reading in history that he can make up", but his struggles with classwork ultimately kept him off the Ohio State team in 1942. Gillom enlisted in the U.S. Army during World War II before he played on the varsity team.

Gillom fought in the European Theatre of World War II and participated in the Battle of the Bulge near the end of the war. He was discharged after three years of service, having earned three Bronze Star Medals. By that time, Brown had become the head coach of the Cleveland Browns, a team in the new All-America Football Conference (AAFC). Brown wanted Gillom on the team, but changed his approach after signing fullback Marion Motley in 1946. Motley, a black star who played in high school for Massillon rival Canton, joined the Browns from the University of Nevada, Reno, where former Canton coach Jim Aiken was head coach. As compensation for drawing Motley away, Brown arranged for Gillom to go to Nevada for the 1946 season. Gillom led the nation in punting at Nevada that year, but left the school in December because of poor grades.

== Cleveland Browns ==
Gillom signed with the Browns in early 1947, making him the third black player to join the team after Bill Willis and Motley. Before the season started, he played in the College All-Star Game, a now-defunct matchup between the National Football League (NFL) champion and a selection of the best college players from around the country. Gillom played well in the game as the All-Stars beat the Chicago Bears, 16–0. With the Browns, Gillom was used mostly as a punter and a defensive end. Gillom became the first African American punter in NFL history. He came in second in the AAFC in punting average in his rookie season at 44.6 yards as Cleveland finished the regular season with a 12–1–1 record and beat the New York Yankees to win the AAFC championship. "Gillom had such a powerful leg and kicked the ball so far; before that punters used to line up 10, 12 yards behind the center", running back Sherman Howard later said. "He started the 15-yard drop. And with Horace, he would kick it so high that by the time guys got down, the ball was coming down, so most guys had to fair catch." Horace Gillom was a versatile American football player in the National Football League (NFL). Not only did he excel as the first full-time African American punter in the NFL he was also a reliable receiver (end).

The following season, Gillom saw time as an offensive end when regular Dante Lavelli broke his leg and was sidelined for seven games. Cleveland won all of its games in 1948, recording professional football's first perfect season and beating the Buffalo Bills in the championship game. The Browns won the championship again in 1949, but the AAFC dissolved after the season and the Browns were absorbed by the more established NFL. Gillom's salary was $6,000 ($81,189 in 2025 dollars) in the Browns' last AAFC year.

The 1950 season was another strong one for Cleveland. The team finished the regular season with a 10–2 record, tied with the New York Giants for first place in the American Conference. This set up a playoff with the Giants to secure a spot in the championship game against the Los Angeles Rams. Cleveland won 8–3, thanks in part to Gillom's punts. His kicks repeatedly gave the Giants poor field position and pinned them near their own end zone. The Browns went on to win the championship against the Rams on a last-minute Lou Groza field goal. Gillom finished second in the league in punting average, with 43.2 yards.

Cleveland reached the championship game in the following three seasons but lost each time, once to the Rams and twice to the Detroit Lions. Gillom led the NFL in punting in 1951, with a 45.5-yard average. He again led the league the following season, averaging 45.7 yards per punt, and was selected for the Pro Bowl, football's all-star game. Gillom was second in the NFL in punting average in 1953. During his years with the Browns, Gillom's long, high punts and his habit of standing further back from center than was usual set a precedent followed by many of his successors at the position. His kicks had a long hang time, which allowed teammates to get further downfield to defend the punt return. "We didn't just go back 40 yards, we went back 50, 60 yards because he just kicked it so damn far and so high", Otto Schnellbacher, who played against the Browns with the Yankees and Giants, later said. Gillom's positioning behind the center gave him more space to kick but also put more distance between him and the opposing linemen, reducing the likelihood of a block.

The Browns reached the championship game in 1954 and beat the Lions for a second NFL title. Gillom had the league's second-longest punting average for the second year in a row. Another championship followed in 1955. Despite his consistency, Gillom's punting slipped in his last years, and by 1956 he had to compete with rookies for a spot on the roster. At 35, he was Cleveland's oldest player and suffered from a sore back. He made the team but was released toward the end of the season in November. When he left the game, his career punting average of 43.8 yards was the second-best in NFL history behind Sammy Baugh's 45.1 yards. He never averaged below 41.2 yards per punt and was among the top three punters in his league in six of the eight years when he punted full-time. Because his punts were so long and high, opponents' punt returns were limited. He punted more than 400 times from the start of his career before one was returned for a touchdown. He was also a serviceable end, making 43 receptions when he played the position for periods in 1948 and 1949. Brown lauded his diverse abilities, calling him "the best all around athlete I coached at Massillon" and saying he was "successful at everything he did".

== Later life and death ==
Gillom attempted a return to football in 1961, trying out for a spot on the New York Titans of the American Football League, a circuit formed the previous year. He was released, however, before playing in a game. He moved to Los Angeles in the 1964 and worked at the city's recreation department as a security guard. He was a "trouble chaser" who patrolled the city's parks without a uniform or weapon. "Any playground having trouble they call on me", he said in 1970. "The last one was a gang fight two weeks ago at a pool in Highland Park."

Gillom lived in Los Angeles for the rest of his life. He died in 1985 of a heart attack suffered while working as a security guard at a hospital. He had a son and a daughter with his wife, Mamie. Gillom was named a Browns Legend in 2007, an honor given by the team to the best players in its history. He was inducted into Stark County, Ohio's high school football hall of fame in 2009. Gillom still holds the Browns record for longest punt, at 80 yards, and is second in career punting yards behind Don Cockroft.
