= Bill Willis =

American football player (1921–2007)

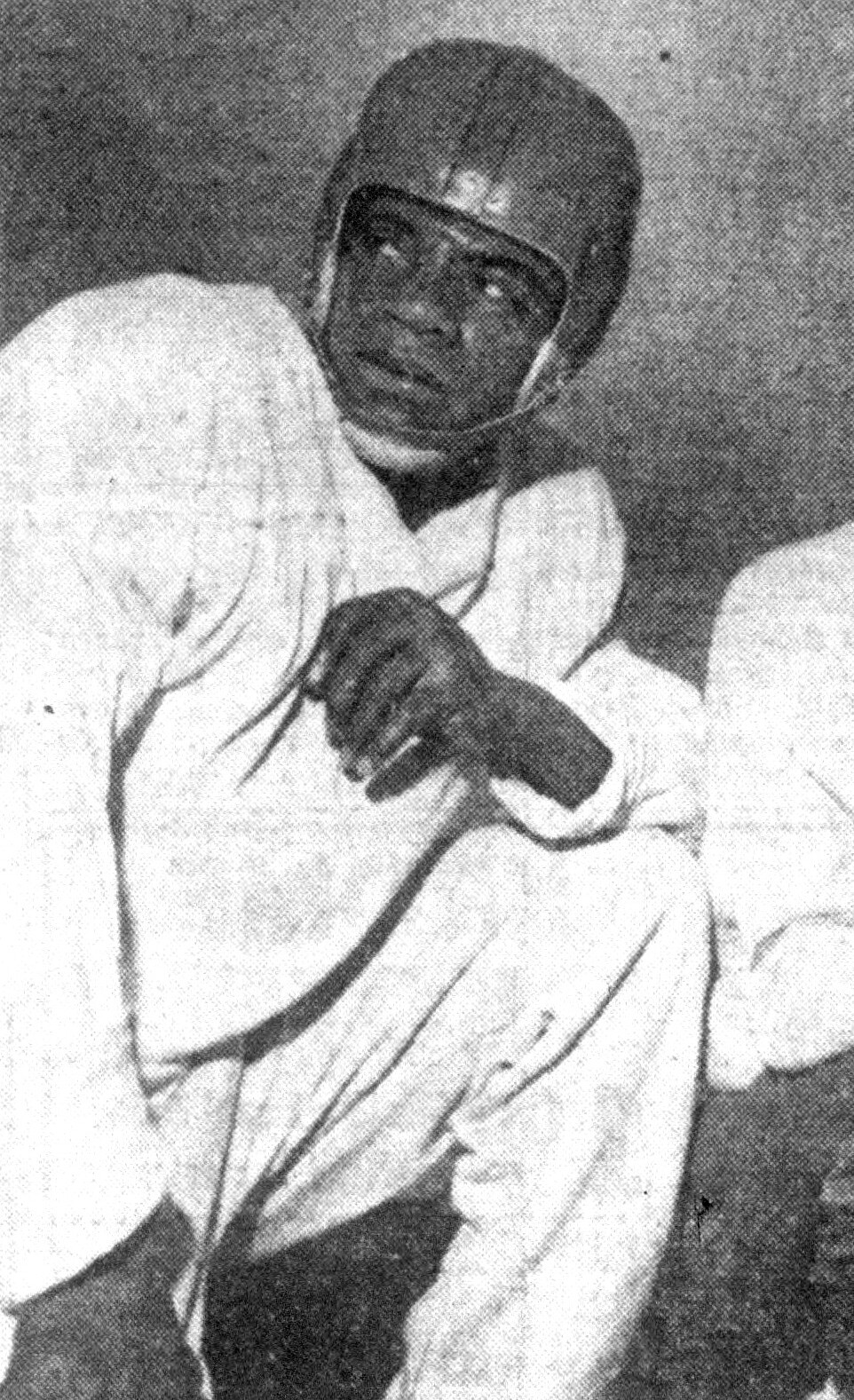
- Willis in 1951

No. 30, 45, 60
- Positions: Middle guard, guard

Personal information
- Born: October 5, 1921; Georgia, U.S.
- Died: November 27, 2007 (aged 86); Columbus, Ohio, U.S.
- Listed height: 6 ft 2 in (1.88 m)
- Listed weight: 213 lb (97 kg)

Career information
- High school: East (Columbus)
- College: Ohio State (1942–1944)
- NFL draft: 1946: undrafted

Career history

Playing
- Cleveland Browns (1946–1953)

Coaching
- Kentucky State (1945) Head coach

Awards and highlights
- NFL champion (1950); 4× AAFC champion (1946–1949); 6× First-team All-Pro (1947, 1948, 1950–1953); First-team All-AAFC (1946); Second-team All-Pro (1949); 3× Pro Bowl (1950–1952); NFL 1940s All-Decade Team; Cleveland Browns Ring of Honor; National champion (1942); First-team All-American (1944); 2× First-team All-Big Ten (1943, 1944); Ohio State Buckeyes No. 99 retired; Ohio State Buckeyes No. 0 honored

Career NFL/AAFC statistics
- Games played: 99
- Games started: 63
- Fumble recoveries: 2
- Interceptions: 1
- Stats at Pro Football Reference
- Pro Football Hall of Fame
- College Football Hall of Fame

William Karnet Willis (October 5, 1921 – November 27, 2007) was an American professional football player who was a middle guard and guard for eight seasons with the Cleveland Browns of the All-America Football Conference (AAFC) and the National Football League (NFL). Known for his quickness and strength despite his small stature, Willis was one of the dominant defensive football players of the 1940s and early 1950s. He was named an All-Pro in every season of his career and reached the NFL's Pro Bowl in three of the four seasons he played in the league. His techniques and style of play were emulated by other teams, and his versatility as a pass-rusher and coverage man influenced the development of the modern-day linebacker position. When he retired, Cleveland coach Paul Brown called him "one of the outstanding linemen in the history of professional football".

Willis was one of the first two African Americans to play professional football in the modern era, signing with the Browns and playing a game in September 1946 along with Marion Motley, a contest which took place months before Jackie Robinson broke the color barrier in the Major League Baseball (MLB) with the Brooklyn Dodgers.

Born in Georgia but raised in Columbus, Ohio, Willis attended Ohio State University, where he joined the track and football teams. He was part of a Buckeyes football team that won the school's first national championship in 1942. After graduating in 1944, Willis heard about a new AAFC club in Cleveland led by his old Ohio State coach, Paul Brown. He got a tryout and made the team. With Willis as a defensive anchor, the Browns won all four AAFC championships between 1946 and 1949, when the league dissolved. The Browns were then absorbed by the NFL, where Willis continued to succeed. Cleveland won the NFL championship in 1950.

Willis retired in 1954 to focus on helping troubled youth, first as Cleveland's assistant recreation commissioner and later as the chairman of the Ohio Youth Commission. He remained in that position until his death in 2007. Willis was inducted into both the College Football Hall of Fame and Pro Football Hall of Fame in the 1970s. He married Odessa Porter and had three sons, William Jr., Clement and Dan.

== Early life ==
William Karnet Willis was born in Georgia on October 5, 1921, the son of Clement and Williana "Anna" Willis. The family moved to Columbus, Ohio, about 1922. His father died of pneumonia on April 10, 1923, and he was raised by his grandfather and mother amid the financial hardships of the Great Depression. He ran dashes and threw the shot put on the track team and played on the football team at Columbus East High School. He worried about being compared to his older brother Claude, who had been an All-State fullback at the same school a few years earlier, Willis eschewed the backfield to play tackle and end. He had a successful three years on the high school team, winning Honorable Mention All-State honors as a senior. After graduating from high school, Willis took a year off and worked. Willis's high school coach wrote to Paul Brown, the Ohio State University football coach, saying the school should recruit him because he matched the type of player Brown liked: large, but more importantly, quick. He enrolled at Ohio State in 1941.

== College career ==
Willis was small for a lineman at 202 pounds (92 kg), and despite signing up to play for Brown he was initially expected to focus on track and the 60-yard and 100-yard dashes. Brown, however, brought him onto the football team as a sophomore in 1942. Willis played middle guard, a defensive position opposite the center. That year, the Buckeyes posted a 9–1 record and won the Big Ten Conference. The team was voted national champion by the Associated Press, a first for the school.

Willis strikes an intimidating middle guard pose ahead of the 1943 Ohio State season.

Before the following season, scores of Ohio State players left the school to join the military as American involvement in World War II intensified. Willis volunteered for the U.S. Army, but was classified as 4-F, or only available for service in case of a national emergency, due to varicose veins. With many stars gone, however, Brown fielded a team composed mostly of 17-year-olds who were not yet eligible for military service. The "Baby Bucks", as they were called, fell to 3–6, although Willis was named a first-team All Conference selection in the Big Ten.

By the 1944 season, Brown had joined the military and was coaching a team at Great Lakes Naval Training Station outside Chicago. Under his substitute, coach Carroll Widdoes, the Buckeyes completed an undefeated season. Willis was named to the United Press International and Look magazine All-America teams. He played in the 1944 College All-Star Game at Chicago, and was named the game's outstanding player.

== Professional career ==
A professional football career was unlikely for Willis when he graduated from Ohio State in 1945. While the exclusion of black players was not a written rule, no African-American had played in the National Football League since 1933. The gentlemen's agreement had been in effect ever since segregationist George Preston Marshall entered the league as owner of the Boston Redskins. In his physical prime but with no real prospect of playing professionally, Willis took a job as the head football coach at Kentucky State College in the fall of 1945. Kentucky State, an historically black school, played against other small black schools near its campus in Frankfort.

Willis, however, still wanted to play football. "My heart was not really in coaching", he later said. He read that Paul Brown was coaching a team in the newly formed All-America Football Conference (AAFC), and he gave Brown a call. Brown said he would get back to Willis on a possible tryout. In the meantime, Willis was recruited by the Montreal Alouettes, a team in the Canadian Football League. Not hearing back from Brown, he planned to go play in Canada. Willis was about to leave for Montreal when Paul Hornung, a sportswriter for the Columbus Dispatch, called with a message from Brown. Hornung told Willis to go for a tryout in Bowling Green, Ohio, where the new team, the Cleveland Browns, was holding its training camp.

Willis went to the camp and impressed Brown with his speed and reflexes, as he had at Ohio State. Brown lined him up against center Mo Scarry in practice on his first day. Willis beat him every time. Scarry complained that Willis was coming across the line before he snapped the ball. On one snap, Scarry stepped on quarterback Otto Graham's foot as he backpedaled to handle Willis. Brown took a look himself: Willis was not offside. He was getting a jump by watching for the center's fingers to tighten on the ball. "He was quick", said Alex Agase, who later joined the Browns as a guard. "I don't think there was anybody as quick at that position, or any position for that matter. He came off that ball with that ball as quick as anything you would want to see."

Willis made the team, and 10 days later the Browns signed a second African-American player, fullback Marion Motley. Willis played middle guard for the Browns, lining up opposite the center but often dropping back into coverage to defend the pass. He had a playing style and physique similar to that of the modern-day linebacker. For Brown, signing Willis and Motley was nothing unusual. Brown had black players on his teams from the time he coached at Massillon Washington High School in Massillon, Ohio. The coach did not care about race one way or the other; he wanted to field the best team he could. "I never considered football players black or white, nor did I keep or cut a player just because of his color", Brown wrote in his autobiography. In joining the Browns in 1946, Willis and Motley were two of four professional football players who broke the color barrier in 1946, a year before Jackie Robinson became Major League Baseball's first black player in the modern era. Brown later added other black players to the team, including Horace Gillom and Len Ford.

With the Browns, Willis became an anchor on defense as the team dominated the AAFC. The team won each of the league's four championship games before the AAFC folded and the Browns, along with two other teams, were absorbed by the National Football League (NFL) following the 1949 season. Willis was named to all-AAFC teams in every year of its existence.

While the team was a success, Willis and Motley contended with their share of racism. They were taunted, stepped on and insulted on the field. Off-the-field incidents also occurred. In their first season in 1946, Willis and Motley did not travel to a game against the Miami Seahawks after they received threatening letters and Miami officials said they would invoke a Florida law that forbade black players from competing against whites. Another time, a hotel where the team was staying asked Willis and Motley to leave. Brown threatened to move the entire team, and the hotel's management backed down. Willis and Motley were forced to stay in a separate hotel for a 1949 AAFC all-star game in Houston, Texas.

The Browns' success continued when the team entered the NFL in 1950. In a playoff game that year against the New York Giants, Willis caught up with running back Gene "Choo-Choo" Roberts on a breakaway reception in the fourth quarter to prevent the touchdown and ensure a Browns victory. "I knew it meant the ball game", he said. "I just had to catch him." The Browns beat the Giants 8–3 and went on to win the NFL championship in 1950. Willis was one of seven Browns players chosen for the first-ever Pro Bowl that year.

The 1951 and 1952 seasons were equally successful for Willis, although the Browns lost in the NFL championship to the Los Angeles Rams and Detroit Lions. He was an all-pro selection and was named to the Pro Bowl in both years. In 1953, when the Browns lost a third championship game in a row, Willis was named an all-pro but did not make the Pro Bowl.

Both Willis and Motley retired after the 1953 season. Willis was 32 years old and had played eight seasons for the Browns, earning all-pro honors every year he played. He was the best player on a strong defense that was crucial to Cleveland's success in the AAFC and NFL. He was also the embodiment of what Brown looked for in his players: speed and intelligence instead of size. At around 210 pounds, he was small for a lineman, even in his era. Willis's play as a powerful but quick middle guard influenced the development of the modern linebacker position. "In my opinion Bill ranks as one of the outstanding linemen in the history of professional football", Brown said when he retired. "He certainly was the fastest and many coaches use his technique as a model in teaching line play."

== Later career and death ==
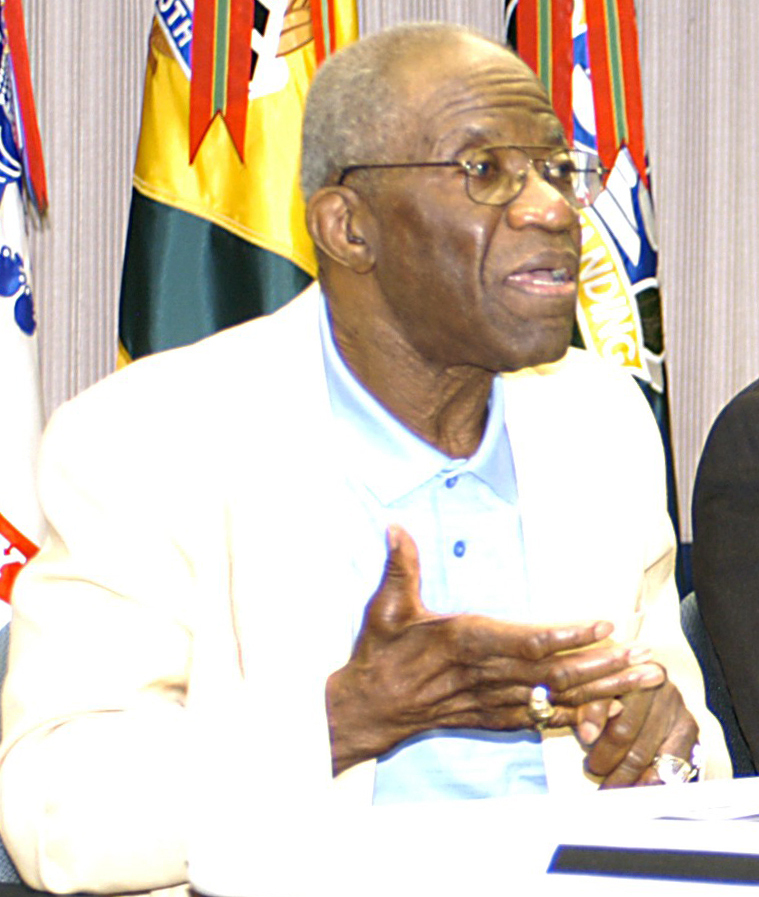
Willis speaking at a Black History Month event in 2007

Willis retired because he wanted to concentrate on other activities; he had become a popular figure in Ohio and worked with youth in Cleveland and Columbus. He accepted a $6,570-a-year job as Cleveland's assistant recreation commissioner. "This is the type of work I want to do, working with kids", he said. By the late 1970s, he was the chairman of the Ohio Youth Commission, a state agency created to combat criminality among young people. He died in 2007. He was married to Odessa Porter until her death in 2002. The couple had three sons, William Jr., Clement and Dan.

== Honors and legacy ==
Willis was inducted into the College Football Hall of Fame in 1971. In 1977, he was inducted as a charter member of the Ohio State Varsity O Hall of Fame. He was elected the same year to the Pro Football Hall of Fame. Ohio State University honored Willis on November 3, 2007, by retiring his #99 jersey. Willis was named as a finalist for the NFL 100 All-Time Team at the defensive lineman position.

In 2020, Ohio State designated the #0 jersey (the Block O jersey) to be worn in recognition of Willis. A new OSU player will wear the number each season.
