= 1948 All-Pro Team =

Official list of the best NFL players in 1948

The 1948 All-Pro Team consisted of American football players who were chosen by various selectors for the All-Pro team for the 1948 football season. Teams were selected by, among others, the Associated Press (AP), the United Press (UP), The Sporting News, and the New York Daily News. The AP and Sporting News selections included players from the National Football League (NFL) and All-America Football Conference; the UP selections were limited to players from the NFL.

== Selections ==
Position	Player	Team	Selector(s)
Quarterback	Otto Graham	Cleveland Browns	AP-1, TSN-2
Quarterback	Sammy Baugh	Washington Redskins	AP-2, UP-1, TSN-2
Quarterback	Tommy Thompson	Philadelphia Eagles	AP-2
Halfback	Steve Van Buren	Philadelphia Eagles	AP-1, UP-1, TSN-1
Halfback	Charley Trippi	Chicago Cardinals	AP-1, UP-1, TSN-1
Fullback	Marion Motley	Cleveland Browns	AP-1, TSN-1
Fullback	Pat Harder	Chicago Cardinals	UP-1
End	Mac Speedie	Cleveland Browns	AP-1, TSN-1
End	Malcolm Kutner	Chicago Cardinals	AP-1, UP-1, TSN-1
End	Pete Pihos	Philadelphia Eagles	UP-1
Tackle	Dick Huffman	Los Angeles Rams	AP-1, UP-1, TSN-1
Tackle	Bob Reinhard	Los Angeles Dons	AP-1
Tackle	Al Wistert	Philadelphia Eagles	UP-1, TSN-1
Guard	Buster Ramsey	Chicago Cardinals	AP-1, UP-1, TSN-1
Guard	Dick Barwegan	Baltimore Colts	AP-1, TSN-2
Guard	Ray Bray	Chicago Bears	UP-1
Guard	Bill Willis	Cleveland Browns	TSN-1
Center	Bulldog Turner	Chicago Bears	AP-1, UP-1, TSN-1
