= Šušteršič =

Šušteršič is a Slovenian surname. Notable people with the surname include:

- Ivan Šusteršič (1863–1925), Slovenian lawyer and politician
- Izidor Šušteršič (born 1977), Slovenian snowboarder
- Matic Šušteršič (1980–2005), Slovenian sprinter

== See also ==
- Ed Sustersic (1922–1967), American football player
