= Dante Lavelli =

American football player (1923–2009)

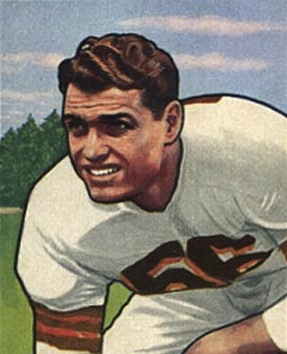
- Lavelli on a 1950 football card

No. 56, 86
- Position: End

Personal information
- Born: February 23, 1923; Hudson, Ohio, U.S.
- Died: January 20, 2009 (aged 85); Cleveland, Ohio, U.S.
- Listed height: 6 ft 0 in (1.83 m)
- Listed weight: 191 lb (87 kg)

Career information
- High school: Hudson
- College: Ohio State (1942)
- NFL draft: 1947: 12th round, 103rd overall pick

Career history
- Cleveland Browns (1946–1956)

Awards and highlights
- 3× NFL champion (1950, 1954, 1955); 4× AAFC champion (1946–1949); 3× First-team All-Pro (1946, 1947, 1953); 2× Second-team All-Pro (1948, 1949); 3× Pro Bowl (1951, 1953, 1954); AAFC receptions co-leader (1946); AAFC receiving yards leader (1946); NFL 1940s All-Decade Team; Cleveland Browns Ring of Honor; National champion (1942)

Career AAFC/NFL statistics
- Receptions: 386
- Receiving yards: 6,488
- Receiving touchdowns: 62
- Military career
- Allegiance: United States
- Branch: U.S. Army
- Service years: 1942–1945
- Unit: 28th Infantry Division
- Conflicts: World War II: European Theater; Normandy Invasion; Battle of the Bulge; Siege of Bastogne
- Stats at Pro Football Reference
- Pro Football Hall of Fame

Dante Bert Joseph Lavelli (February 23, 1923 – January 20, 2009), nicknamed "Gluefingers", was an American professional football player. An end, he played for the Cleveland Browns in the All-America Football Conference (AAFC) and the National Football League (NFL) from 1946 to 1956. Starring alongside quarterback Otto Graham, fullback Marion Motley, kicker Lou Groza and fellow receiver Mac Speedie, Lavelli was an integral part of a Browns team that won seven championships during his 11-season career. Lavelli was known for his sure hands and improvisations on the field. He was also renowned for making catches in critical situations, earning the nickname "Mr. Clutch". Browns head coach Paul Brown once said of him: "Lavelli had one of the strongest pairs of hands I've ever seen, when he went up for a pass with a defender, you could almost always count on him coming back down with the ball."

Lavelli grew up in Hudson, Ohio, and played football, baseball and basketball at his local high school. After graduating, he enrolled at Ohio State University, where he played only a handful of games before he was drafted for service in the U.S. Army during World War II. Returning in 1945 after serving in Europe, he joined the Browns in the team's first-ever season in the AAFC. Helped by Lavelli's play, the Browns won each of the AAFC's championships before the league dissolved in 1949 and the team was absorbed by the NFL. Cleveland continued to succeed in the NFL, winning championships in 1950, 1954 and 1955. Lavelli, who helped found the National Football League Players Association toward the end of his career, retired after the 1956 season.

After retiring from football, Lavelli held a variety of coaching and scouting jobs and was active in NFL alumni affairs. He also ran a furniture store in Rocky River, Ohio. He was elected to the Pro Football Hall of Fame in 1975. He died in a Cleveland hospital in 2009.

== Early life ==
Lavelli was born and grew up in Hudson, Ohio, a small town in the northeastern part of the state. Both of his parents were Italian immigrants. His father Angelo Lavelli was a blacksmith who made shoes for horses on nearby farms. As a child, he practiced catching by throwing baseballs against walls and trying to catch them when they bounced back. He liked to have friends throw ping-pong balls at him to see if he could catch them.

Lavelli was a standout as a running back at Hudson High School and developed a reliable set of hands. Lavelli's Hudson High Explorers football team had three undefeated seasons and won three county championships. He also played baseball and basketball in high school.

Notre Dame offered Lavelli a scholarship, and he committed to attend the school. After he had a chance encounter with Eddie Prokop, however, an able running back who was a fifth-string player for Notre Dame, Lavelli was convinced to look elsewhere. "If Eddie Prokop were a fifth-string player, I was not one to sit on anyone's bench," he later said. Lavelli enrolled at Ohio State University in 1941 after learning that Paul Brown was appointed the football team's new head coach. Brown had developed a sterling reputation as the high school coach at Massillon Washington High School in Massillon, Ohio, losing only eight games in nine years there. Lavelli's catching ability had made him a star infielder in high school, and the Detroit Tigers of Major League Baseball recruited him to play second base in the low minor leagues. He refused the invitation, opting to concentrate on football.

== College career and military service ==
On arrival at Ohio State, Lavelli roomed with Les Horvath and Don McCafferty and played on the freshman team under coach Trevor Rees. Brown switched Lavelli to end (the position is now called wide receiver). His playing time with the football team was limited, however, due to injury. He became a first-string end as a sophomore in 1942, but was ailing from a charley horse in his thigh and sat out the first game of the season against a Fort Knox military team. He had recovered by the third game of the season and started in a game against Southern California. Lavelli was hit in the knee while grabbing for a pass near the end of the game, however, and broke a bone. He was sidelined for the rest of the season. The Buckeyes won the college football national championship that year.

After the 1942 season, Lavelli was drafted by the U.S. Army as American involvement in World War II intensified. After basic training and a number of other specialized courses on land-sea assaults, he was sent with the 28th Infantry Division to fight in the European Theatre of World War II. There his division landed on Omaha Beach, part of the Allied invasion of Germany-occupied France in 1944. He was involved with American forces in Germany's Battle of the Bulge offensive and in the Siege of Bastogne later the same year. One in five members of his division was killed in battle.

== Professional career ==
After returning from the war, Lavelli was again offered a chance to play baseball with the Tigers. He saw a matchup in late 1945 between the National Football League's New York Giants and Washington Redskins and noticed that a former teammate at Ohio State named Sam Fox was an end for the Giants. "I thought if he could make the grade, so could I," Lavelli later said. When Paul Brown offered him a chance to play on a new professional team he was coaching in the All-America Football Conference (AAFC) in 1946, Lavelli jumped at the opportunity. He was given a $500 bonus ($8,255 in today's dollars) for signing with the team, called the Cleveland Browns.

Lavelli attended the Browns' first training camp in 1946. Competition was fierce for a spot on the roster, but Lavelli was one of the men who made it. He was up against a number of National Football League veterans and former college stars. "The toughest game I ever played in was the first intrasquad scrimmage game," he said later. "Nobody talked to each other for two days." He joined an offense that featured quarterback Otto Graham, fullback Marion Motley, placekicker Lou Groza and fellow end Mac Speedie. Lavelli quickly became Graham's top passing target and led the AAFC in receiving as a rookie with 40 receptions and 843 yards. The Browns made it to the league championship that season, and Lavelli caught the game-winning touchdown in a 14–9 victory over the AAFC's New York Yankees. The victory "didn't mean so much then, but as time goes on, it builds," Lavelli said in 2008.

The Browns won the AAFC championship again in 1947. Lavelli finished second in the league in receiving behind his teammate Speedie. Both Lavelli and Speedie were named to all-AAFC teams, as they had been in 1946. Lavelli broke his leg in a preseason game in 1948 and sat out seven weeks. He came back later in the year and helped Cleveland finish a perfect season, catching a touchdown pass in a 31–21 win over the AAFC's Brooklyn Dodgers in the championship game. In a game against the Los Angeles Dons the following year, Lavelli caught four touchdowns and had 209 receiving yards, an AAFC record. In 1949 Cleveland won the AAFC championship for the fourth year in a row. The AAFC dissolved before the 1950 season and three of its teams, including the Browns, were absorbed by the more established National Football League (NFL). Lavelli was the AAFC's all-time leader in yards per catch and second in receiving yards behind Speedie.

As the Browns won in the AAFC, Lavelli continued his studies at Ohio State between seasons and got his degree in 1949. He married Joy Wright of Brecksville, Ohio that year.

When Cleveland entered the NFL in 1950, questions lingered about whether the team could sustain its early dominance. The Browns, however, began the season by beating the two time defending NFL champions, the Philadelphia Eagles. Dante Lavelli recalls, "The game I'll never forget is the first game we played in the National Football League. We beat the Philadelphia Eagles, 35-10. We went back to Cleveland the next day and waiting for us was something else we could be proud of. The press has asked Bert Bell, commissioner of the NFL, what he thought of the game. 'The Browns are the greatest football club I ever saw,' he said."

The team finished with a 10–2 regular-season record and reached the championship game after winning a playoff game against the New York Giants. In the championship against the Los Angeles Rams, Lavelli caught 11 passes – then a record for a title game – and had two touchdown receptions. The Browns won the game 30–28.

Cleveland reached the NFL championship game the following year but lost to the Rams. The 1952 and 1953 seasons followed a similar pattern: the Browns made it to the championship game but lost both times to the Detroit Lions. Lavelli was named to the Pro Bowl in 1951 and 1953. He was seventh in the NFL in receiving yards in 1951, with 586. He gained 783 receiving yards in 1953, the fifth-highest total in the league.

Paul, Otto Graham, Mac Speedie and I developed several passing options that were new to football and later would be copied by other teams. The most famous of these was "the come back toward the passer" option. After it appeared that a pass pattern was not going to be successful, the End would break his pass pattern and turn back toward his passer. It would take another second or so for Otto to hold the ball before passing it, but it proved a valuable addition for our offense.

— Dante Lavelli, as quoted in Expanding Your Horizons: Collegiate Football's Greatest Team

Over the years, Lavelli developed a reputation for making big plays when they counted most, as he had done with his touchdown reception in the Browns' first championship game in 1946. He was nicknamed "Mr. Clutch" in a Pittsburgh Steelers scouting report, although "Gluefingers" – a name bestowed upon him by Browns announcer Bob Neal – was more widely used. He practiced with Graham tirelessly to refine routes and was not afraid to run over the middle, where he risked a pounding from defenders when the ball came his way. "Dante was the greatest guy at catching a ball in a crowd that I have ever seen," Brown once said. Among other innovations, he and Graham also mastered sideline patterns at a time when few teams used them.

The Browns won another championship in 1954, thanks in part to a strong regular-season performance from Lavelli. Lavelli led the team in receiving that year and made the Pro Bowl after the Browns beat the Lions for their second NFL title. A third NFL championship followed in 1955. In the championship game against the Rams, Lavelli caught a touchdown in the second quarter and scored a second time on a 50-yard pass just before the end of the first half. The Browns won 38–14.

Lavelli initially planned to retire in 1955 but came back for a final year in 1956, when the Browns posted a 5–7 record, the team's first-ever losing season. In his 11-year career, Lavelli caught 386 passes for 6,488 yards and 62 touchdowns. He was a confident receiver, former teammates said in later years. He could often be heard calling for Graham to throw him the ball while running routes. He was also known for his ability to improvise on the field. In a 1955 game against the Eagles in slippery conditions, he caught the winning touchdown with less than a minute left by swinging around the goalpost with his arm to get open.

During his Browns career, Lavelli was involved in the creation of the National Football League Players Association. The concept of a union to represent players in league matters was hatched in Lavelli's basement in 1954. Lavelli and two teammates, Abe Gibron and George Ratterman, met every Wednesday to discuss the union. They approached Creighton Miller, a Cleveland lawyer and former Notre Dame star who had worked briefly as an assistant coach with the Browns, for help. The union was founded at a meeting before the NFL championship game in 1956. The following year, the players got $50 per exhibition game, a $5,000 minimum salary, injury pay and medical care. The union is now the primary representative of players in labor negotiations and disputes with the NFL.

== Later life and death ==
After retiring from football, Lavelli ran an appliance business on Cleveland's west side. From 1961 through 1963, he served as an assistant to Graham, who was coaching college stars in the annual College All-Star Game. Lavelli was also an assistant coach with the Browns and a scout for the Chicago Bears. He later owned a furniture store in Rocky River, Ohio and had an interest in two bowling alleys. He had a hand in founding the NFL Alumni Association, a charitable organization.

Lavelli was elected to the Pro Football Hall of Fame in 1975, joining former teammates Graham, Motley and Groza and coach Paul Brown. Later in life, he golfed and attended NFL alumni events and lobbied to get the NFL to recognize his and other players' AAFC statistics. The NFL refused to incorporate AAFC statistics into its own when the league dissolved and the Browns became part of the NFL, in contrast to the NFL's recognition of statistics from the American Football League (AFL) following the AFL-NFL merger. Lavelli called it a "double standard". He died in 2009 at 85 at Fairview Hospital in Cleveland and is buried in St. Mary's Cemetery, Hudson, OH. He and his wife Joy had three children, four grandchildren, and four great-grandsons. Hudson High's stadium is named in honor of him.

The Akron Community Foundation established a Dante Lavelli Scholarship Fund in 2010 to help Hudson High athletes pay for college. "He was one of the best I’d ever seen," Willie Davis, a defensive end who played for the Browns shortly after Lavelli retired, said. "He set the mold with his running patterns and catching the ball." After Lavelli retired, Graham praised his abilities and remembered his eagerness to get his hands on the ball. "He was always coming into the huddle and telling me he was open and that I should throw to him," Graham said. "He wasn't saying that to be a big shot. He just loved to play. If he was open by a few inches, he'd be yelling, 'Otto, Otto.' Many a time when I was stuck and heard that voice I would throw it in his direction and darned if he didn't come down with it. He had fantastic hands."

== Career statistics ==
Legend
	Led the league
	Won the NFL championship
**Bold**	Career high

Year	Team	Games		Receiving					Rushing					Fumbles	
Year	Team	GP	GS	Rec	Yds	Avg	Lng	TD	Att	Yds	Avg	Lng	TD	Fum	Lost
1946	CLE	**14**	8	40	**843**	**21.1**	63	8	**1**	**14**	**14.0**	**14**	0	0	0
1947	CLE	13	6	**49**	799	16.3	**72**	**9**	—	—	—	—	—	0	0
1948	CLE	8	7	25	463	18.5	54	5	**1**	9	9.0	9	0	0	0
1949	CLE	9	7	28	475	17.0	67	7	—	—	—	—	—	0	0
1950	CLE	12	**12**	37	565	15.3	43	5	—	—	—	—	—	**2**	**2**
1951	CLE	12	**12**	43	586	13.6	47	6	—	—	—	—	—	0	0
1952	CLE	8	5	21	336	16.0	41	4	—	—	—	—	—	0	0
1953	CLE	12	**12**	45	783	17.4	55	6	—	—	—	—	—	1	1
1954	CLE	12	**12**	47	802	17.1	64	7	—	—	—	—	—	0	0
1955	CLE	12	**12**	31	492	15.9	49	4	—	—	—	—	—	0	0
1956	CLE	11	11	20	344	17.2	68	1	—	—	—	—	—	1	1
Career		123	104	386	6,488	16.8	72	62	2	23	11.5	14	0	4	4

Source: Pro-Football-Reference.com
