= Ernie Zalejski =

American football player and coach (1925–2012)

No. 89
- Positions: Defensive back, Halfback

Personal information
- Born: November 23, 1925; South Bend, Indiana, U.S.
- Died: August 5, 2012 (aged 86); South Bend, Indiana, U.S.
- Listed height: 6 ft 0 in (1.83 m)
- Listed weight: 185 lb (84 kg)

Career information
- High school: Washington (South Bend)
- College: Notre Dame (1946–1949)
- NFL draft: 1950: 5th round, 62nd overall pick

Career history

Playing
- Chicago Bears (1950)*; Baltimore Colts (1950); Washington Redskins (1951)*; Dallas Texans (1952)*; BC Lions (1954)*
- * Offseason or practice squad member only

Coaching
- Joliet Catholic High School (1954–1958) Head coach

Awards and highlights
- 3× National champion (1946, 1947, 1949)

Career NFL statistics
- Interceptions: 2
- Fumble recoveries: 2
- Return yards: 118
- Stats at Pro Football Reference

Head coaching record
- Career: 24–13–4 (.634)

Ernest Raymond Zalejski (November 23, 1925 – August 5, 2012) was an American professional football back who played one season with the Baltimore Colts of the National Football League (NFL). He was selected by the Chicago Bears in the fifth round of the 1950 NFL draft after playing college football at the University of Notre Dame.

== Early life ==
Zalejski played high school football at Washington High School in South Bend, Indiana, earning all-state honors three times from 1942 to 1944. He was named Most Valuable Player of the North Indiana Conference in 1944. He also won two state championships in 1943 and 1944.

== Military career ==
Zalejski joined the United States Army after graduating from high school in 1945. He served in the Philippines and was in the U.S. occupation force in Japan. He was then shortly stationed in Seattle before being discharged and enrolling at the University of Notre Dame.

== College career ==
Zalejski played for the Notre Dame Fighting Irish from 1946 to 1949. The Fighting Irish won 39 games and were undefeated during his time there. They were also national champions in 1946, 1947 and 1949. Zalejski was named to the Blue Gray All Star Game in 1949.

== Professional career ==
Zalejski was selected by the Chicago Bears of the NFL with the 62nd pick in the fifth round of the 1950 NFL draft. He officially signed with the team on June 29, 1950.

On September 9, 1950, Zalejski, George Blanda, Bob Perina, Tank Crawford, and Bob Jensen were traded to the Baltimore Colts for Dick Barwegan. Zalejski played in eleven games for the Colts during the 1950 season.

Zalejski signed with the Washington Redskins in 1951. He was later released on September 24, 1951.

Zalejski was signed by the Dallas Texans on May 6, 1952, but later released on August 18, 1952.

He signed with the BC Lions of the Western Interprovincial Football Union in 1954 but was later released.

== Coaching career ==
Zalejski served as head coach at Joliet Catholic High School from 1954 to 1958, accumulating a record of 24–13–4. He retired from coaching in 1959.

== Personal life ==
Zalejski was inducted into the Indiana Football Hall of Fame in 1984 and the South Bend Hall of Fame in 2004. He was also area manager of the U.S. Saving Bonds Division of the U.S. Treasury Department.
