= 1950 All-Pro Team =

Official list of the best NFL players in 1950

The 1950 All-Pro Team consisted of American football players chosen by various selectors for the All-Pro team of the National Football League (NFL) for the 1950 NFL season. Teams were selected by, among others, the Associated Press (AP), the United Press (UP), and the New York Daily News.

== Selections ==
Position	Player	Team	Selector(s)
Quarterback	Johnny Lujack	Chicago Bears	AP-1, UP-1, NYDN-1
Quarterback	Bob Waterfield	Los Angeles Rams	AP-2
Quarterback	Otto Graham	Cleveland Browns	UP-2
Quarterback	George Ratterman	New York Yanks	NYDN-2
Halfback	Doak Walker	Detroit Lions	AP-1, UP-1
Halfback	Joe Geri	Pittsburgh Steelers	AP-1, UP-1, NYDN-1
Halfback	Johnny Strzykalski	San Francisco 49ers	AP-2
Fullback	Marion Motley	Cleveland Browns	AP-1, UPI-1, NYDN-1
Fullback	Dick Hoerner	Los Angeles Rams	AP-2
End	Tom Fears	Los Angeles Rams	AP-1, UP-1, NYDN-1
End	Mac Speedie	Cleveland Browns	UP-1, NYDN-1, AP-2
End	Dan Edwards	New York Yanks	AP-1
End	Cloyce Box	Detroit Lions	AP-2
Tackle	George Connor	Chicago Bears	AP-1, UP-1
Tackle	Arnie Weinmeister	New York Giants	AP-1, UP-1, NYDN-1
Tackle	Dick Huffman	Los Angeles Rams	AP-2
Tackle	Bob Reinhard	Los Angeles Rams	AP-2
Guard	Dick Barwegan	Chicago Bears	AP-1, UP-1, NYDN-1
Guard	Joe Signaigo	New York Yanks	AP-1
Guard	Bill Willis	Cleveland Browns	UP-1, NYDN-1
Guard	Buster Ramsey	Chicago Cardinals	AP-2
Tackle	Ray Bray	Chicago Bears	AP-2
Center	Chuck Bednarik	Philadelphia Eagles	AP-1
Center	Clayton Tonnemaker	Green Bay Packers	UP-1, NYDN-1, AP-2
Center	John Rapacz	New York Giants	NYDN-1, UPI-2
