= Vince Banonis =

American football player (1921–2010)

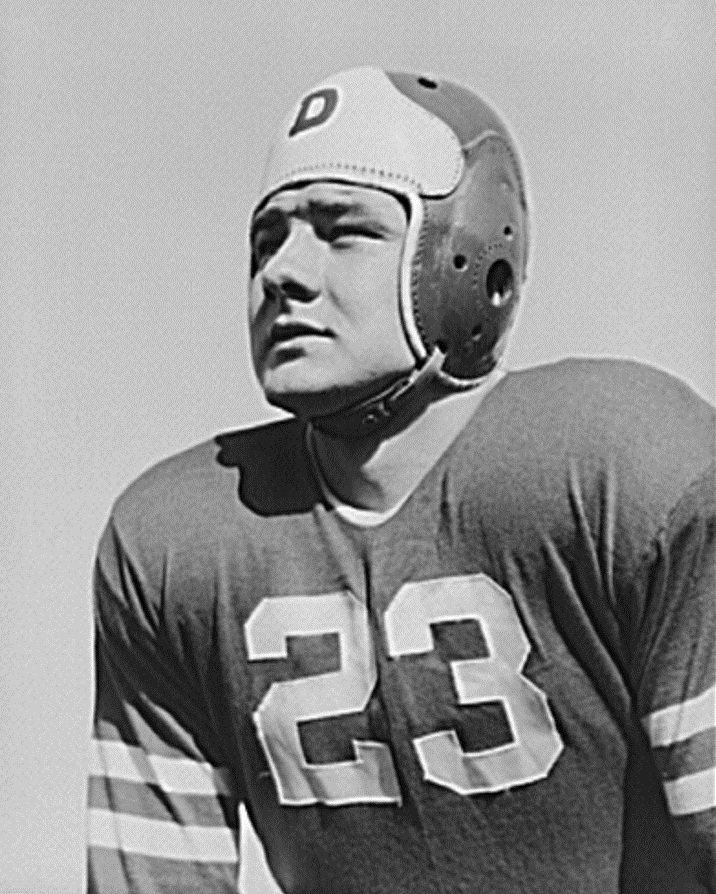
- Banonis in 1941

No. 11, 42, 32, 51
- Positions: Center, tackle, linebacker

Personal information
- Born: April 9, 1921; Detroit, Michigan, U.S.
- Died: October 23, 2010 (aged 89); Southfield, Michigan, U.S.
- Listed height: 6 ft 1 in (1.85 m)
- Listed weight: 230 lb (104 kg)

Career information
- High school: Catholic Central (Redford, Michigan)
- College: Detroit (1938–1941)
- NFL draft: 1942: 4th round, 29th overall pick

Career history
- Chicago Cardinals (1942); Card-Pitt (1944); Chicago Cardinals (1946–1950); Detroit Lions (1951–1953)

Awards and highlights
- 3× NFL champion (1947, 1952, 1953); 2× All-Pro (1947, 1949); First-team All-American (1941)

Career NFL statistics
- Interceptions: 14
- Fumble recoveries: 5
- Touchdowns: 2
- Stats at Pro Football Reference
- College Football Hall of Fame

Vincent Joseph Banonis (April 9, 1921 – October 23, 2010) was an American professional football player. He played college football at the University of Detroit where he was selected as a first-team All-American in 1940. He also played in the National Football League (NFL) for the Chicago Cardinals from 1942 to 1950, and for the Detroit Lions from 1951 to 1953. He was a first-team All-NFL player three times and played on three NFL championship teams. He was inducted into the Michigan Sports Hall of Fame in 1975 and the College Football Hall of Fame in 1986.

== Early life ==
Banonis was born on April 9, 1921, in Detroit, Michigan, to a family of Lithuanian origin. He attended Detroit Catholic Central High School. He was the center and captain for Catholic Central team that won a Detroit city championship.

== College football ==
Banonis enrolled at the University of Detroit in 1938 and played at the center position (on both offense and defense) for head coach Gus Dorais' Detroit Titans football team from 1939 to 1941. In 1939, Detroit's line coach, Bud Boeringer, who had been an All-American center at Notre Dame, told reporters that he had never had a better candidate for center than Banonis. He was reported to be "almost uncanny at diagnosing plays" on defense and to be "particularly strong on forward pass defense." At the end of the 1941 season, Banonis was chosen as a first-round All-American by Collier's Weekly (selected by Grantland Rice), International News Service, and Paramount News. He was also chosen as a second-team All-American by the Newspaper Enterprise Association.

== Professional football ==
Banonis was selected by the Chicago Cardinals in the fourth round of the 1942 NFL draft with the 29th overall pick. Banonis appeared in 11 games for the 1942 Cardinals and intercepted two passes that season.

Banonis' football career was interrupted for three years by wartime service in the United States Navy during World War II. He returned to the Cardinals in 1946 and remained with the club through the 1950 season. During his time with the Cardinals, he was selected as a first-team All-NFL player three times (1947, by UPI, 1948, by Chicago Herald Am. and NY Daily News, and 1949, by Int. News Service) and a second-team All-NFL player three times (1946, by NY Daily News, 1948, by Sporting News and UPI, and 1949, by UPI). He intercepted 11 passes from 1946 to 1949 and led the NFL with 83 return yards on two fumble recoveries in 1947. He was a member of the 1947 Cardinals team that won the NFL championship.

In July 1950, Banonis' younger brother, Vic Banonis, was signed by the Cardinals after playing college football at Georgetown. However, his brother did not appear in any regular season games in the NFL.

In 1951, Banonis was traded by the Cardinals to the Detroit Lions in exchange for offensive lineman Jack Simmons. Banonis appeared in 36 games at center for the Lions from 1951 to 1953 and played on the Lions' NFL championship teams in 1952 and 1953. The Lions signed center Joe Schmidt in 1953, and Banonis appeared in his last professional football game that year at age 32.

== Later life ==
Banonis has been inducted into the Michigan Sports Hall of Fame (1975) and the College Football Hall of Fame (1986). He died in 2010 at age 89 at Providence Hospital in Southfield, Michigan. He was buried at the Holy Sepulchre Cemetery in Southfield.
