= Bob Reinhard =

American football player (1920–1996)

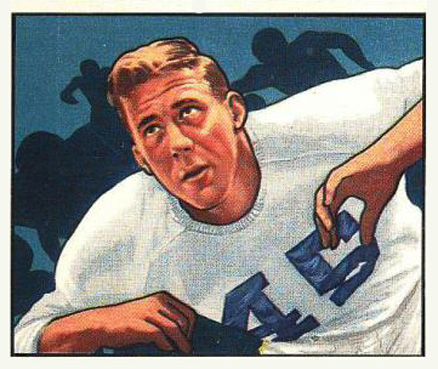
- Reinhard on a 1950 Bowman football card

No. 45, 75
- Positions: Tackle, Fullback, Punter

Personal information
- Born: October 17, 1920; Hollywood, California, U.S.
- Died: August 2, 1996 (aged 75); Salem, Oregon, U.S.
- Listed height: 6 ft 4 in (1.93 m)
- Listed weight: 234 lb (106 kg)

Career information
- High school: Glendale (Glendale, California)
- College: California (1938–1941)
- NFL draft: 1942: 5th round, 34th overall pick

Career history
- Los Angeles Dons (1946–1949); Los Angeles Rams (1950)

Awards and highlights
- 2× Second-team All-Pro (1948, 1950); First-team All-AAFC (1948); 2× Second-team All-AAFC (1946, 1949); 2× First-team All-American (1940, 1941); 2× First-team All-PCC (1940, 1941)

Career NFL + AAFC statistics
- Games played: 66
- Starts: 58
- Punting yards: 3,479
- Total touchdowns: 3
- Stats at Pro Football Reference

Robert Richard Reinhard (October 17, 1920 – August 2, 1996) was an American professional football player who played four seasons with the Los Angeles Dons of the All-America Football Conference (AAFC) and one season with the Los Angeles Rams of the National Football League (NFL). He was selected by the Chicago Cardinals of the National Football League (NFL) in the fifth round of the 1942 NFL draft after playing college football at the University of California, Berkeley.

== Early life ==
Robert Richard Reinhard was born on October 17, 1920, in Hollywood, California. He attended Glendale High School in Glendale, California.

== College career ==
Reinhard was a member of the California Golden Bears of the University of California, Berkeley from 1938 to 1941 and a three-year letterman from 1939 to 1941. He was named first-team All-PCC by the Associated Press (AP) and United Press (UP) in both 1940 and 1941. He earned AP first-team All-American honors in both 1940 and 1941 as well, while being named a second-team All-American by the UP in 1941. Reinhard was inducted into the school's athletics hall of fame in 1990.

== Professional career ==
Reinhard as a member of the Los Angeles Dons in 1946.

Reinhard was selected by the Chicago Cardinals in the fifth round, with the 34th overall pick, of the 1942 NFL draft. However, he never signed with the Cardinals as his football career was interrupted by a stint in the United States Navy during World War II. After the war, he signed with the Los Angeles Dons of the All-America Football Conference (AAFC) in 1946. He started all 14 games for the Dons at left tackle during the 1946 season, punting 44 times for 1,996 yards (45.4 average) and scoring one blocked kick/missed field goal return touchdown. He was named second-team All-AAFC by both the AAFC and New York Daily News for the 1946 season. Reinhard played in all 14 games, starting 11, in 1947, recording 28 punts for 1,279 yards (an AAFC-leading 45.7 average), 41 carries for 150 yards, three catches for 34 yards and one touchdown, and one interception. He started all 14 games at left tackle for the second season in 1948, punting six times for 204 yards and catching four passes for 54 yards. For his performance during the 1948 season, he earned AP, AAFC, New York Daily News, and United Press International (UPI) first-team All-AAFC honors, and second-team Sporting News All-NFL/AAFC recognition. Reinhard started all 12 games at left tackle for the Dons during the AAFC's final season in 1949, garnering first-team All-AAFC honors from the AAFC, and second-team All-AAFC accolades from the AP and New York Daily News.

On June 2, 1950, the Cardinals traded Reinhard's NFL rights to the Los Angeles Rams for Gerard Cowhig, Bob Shaw, and Tom Keane. Reinhard appeared in all 12 games, starting seven, for the Rams during his final pro season in 1950, earning New York Daily News first-team All-Pro, and AP and UPI second-team All-Pro honors. He also started two playoffs games for the Rams that year. He became a free agent after the season.

== Personal life ==
Reinhard's brother Bill Reinhard also played for the Dons from 1947 to 1948. Bob died on August 2, 1996, in Salem, Oregon.
