= George Connor (American football) =

American football player (1925–2003)

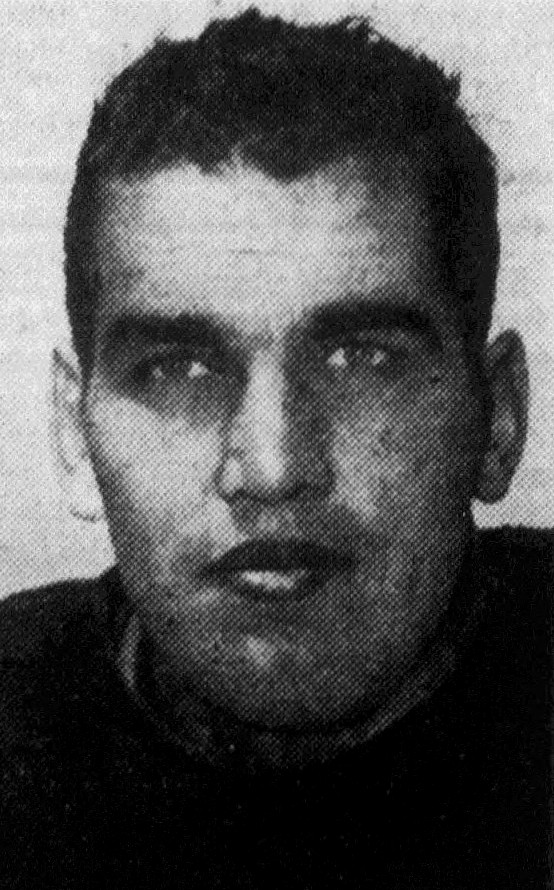
- Connor, circa 1951

No. 81, 71
- Positions: Tackle, guard, linebacker

Personal information
- Born: January 21, 1925; Chicago, Illinois, U.S.
- Died: March 31, 2003 (aged 78); Chicago, Illinois, U.S.
- Listed height: 6 ft 3 in (1.91 m)
- Listed weight: 240 lb (109 kg)

Career information
- High school: De La Salle (Chicago)
- College: Holy Cross (1942-1943); Notre Dame (1946-1947)
- NFL draft: 1946: 1st round, 5th overall pick

Career history

Playing
- Chicago Bears (1948–1955)

Coaching
- Chicago Bears (1956–1957) Assistant coach

Awards and highlights
- 4× First-team All-Pro (1950–1953); 2× Second-team All-Pro (1949, 1955); 4× Pro Bowl (1950–1953); NFL 1940s All-Decade Team; NFL 75th Anniversary All-Time Team; 100 greatest Bears of All-Time; 2× National champion (1946, 1947); Outland Trophy (1946); 2× Consensus All-American (1946, 1947); Second-team All-American (1943); 2× First-team All-Eastern (1942, 1943)

Career NFL statistics
- Games played: 91
- Games started: 78
- Interceptions: 7
- Interception yards: 66
- Fumble recoveries: 10
- Defensive touchdowns: 1
- Stats at Pro Football Reference
- Pro Football Hall of Fame
- College Football Hall of Fame

George Leo Connor (January 21, 1925 – March 31, 2003) was an American professional football player for the Chicago Bears of the National Football League (NFL) from 1948 to 1955. He played offensive tackle on offense, and linebacker on the defensive side of the ball.

Connor attended both the College of the Holy Cross and the University of Notre Dame. He won the first Outland Trophy as the best college lineman in 1946. Sportswriter Grantland Rice once observed Connor was "the closest thing to a Greek God since Apollo". He is a member of both the Pro Football Hall of Fame and of the College Football Hall of Fame.

== Biography ==
=== Early life and college ===
George Connor was born in Chicago, and was not expected to survive infancy, weighing only three pounds at his premature birth. He played two years of college football at Holy Cross and was a second-team All-America selection by the Associated Press in 1943. He then served in the United States Navy during World War II. After the war, Connor was drafted in the first round, fifth overall by the New York Giants in 1946, but instead transferred to the University of Notre Dame to be closer to his ill father. He was twice a consensus All-American as a tackle for the Notre Dame Fighting Irish football team, in 1946 and 1947. He won the first Outland Trophy as the nation's best college interior lineman in 1946. Connor was a key component of Notre Dame's 1946 and 1947 national championship teams, and was the captain of the unbeaten 1947 team.

=== Professional career ===
After graduating, Connor received an offer from the Cleveland Browns of the All-America Football Conference, but chose to sign with his hometown Chicago Bears in 1948 for $13,000 a year guaranteed for three years, a high salary at the time for a lineman. He played for the Bears from 1948 through 1955. In eight seasons, he was named a first-team All-Pro five times, and was an invitee to the first four Pro Bowls.

At first exclusively a tackle on defense, in a game in 1949 Bears head coach George Halas ordered Connor to stand upright outside the end in an attempt to thwart the running of Philadelphia Eagles halfback Steve Van Buren. The plan worked, as Connor held Van Buren in check and the Bears handed the Eagles their only loss of the season. "We always set high standards for George Connor and he exceeded them," said Halas. He became one of the first big, mobile linebackers in the NFL.

Connor retired during training camp in 1956, still bothered by a knee injury sustained in 1954.

=== Honors and later life ===
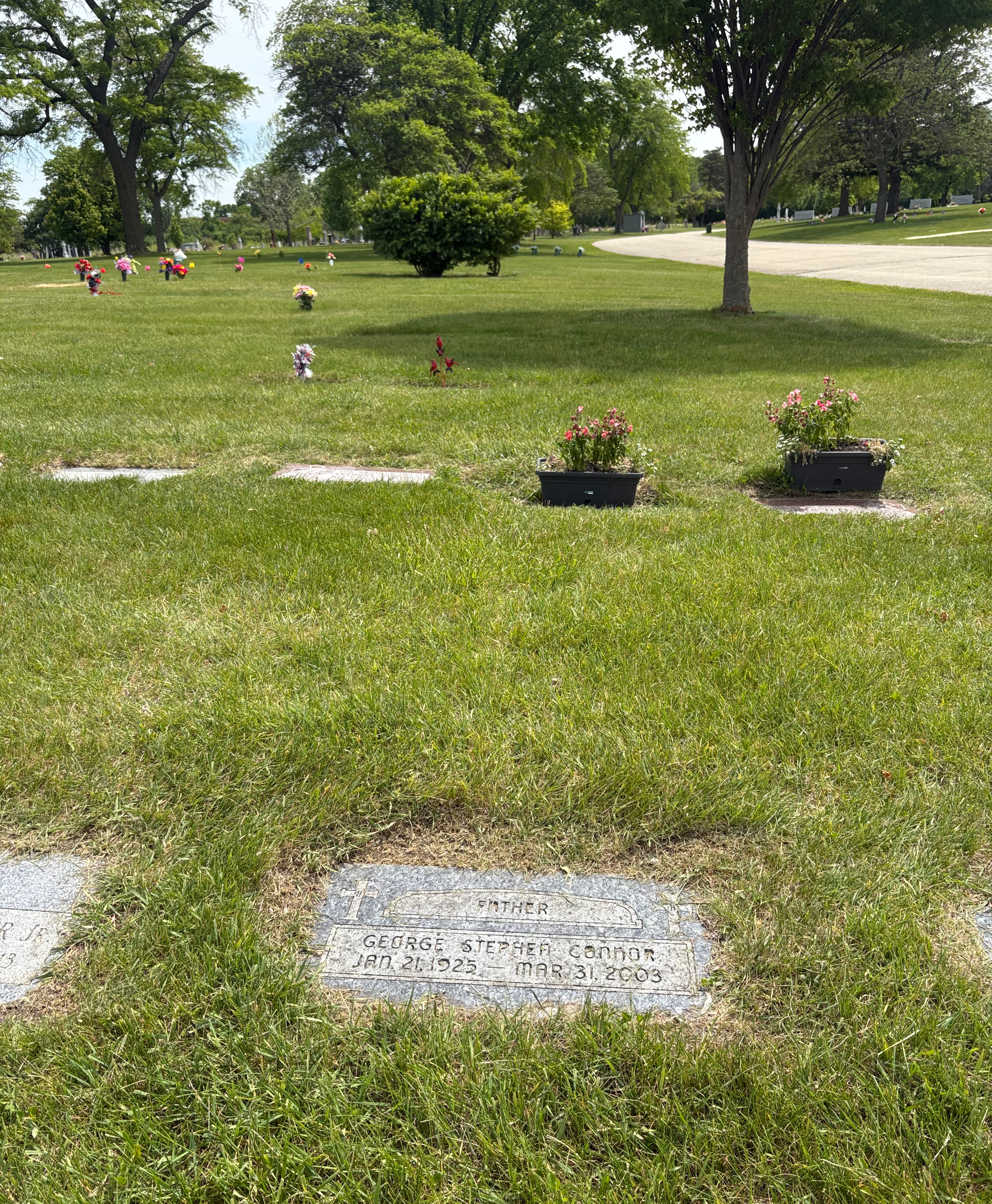
Connor's grave at All Saints Cemetery

In 1963, Connor was inducted into the College Football Hall of Fame. He was enshrined in the Pro Football Hall of Fame with the class of 1975. He is a member of the National Football League 1940s All-Decade Team, selected by the Pro Football Hall of Fame committee in 1969 to honor the best players of the 1940s.

For several years Connor was a color commentator for NFL telecasts on CBS, working Green Bay Packers games in 1958, Chicago Bears games from 1959 to 1967, and various regional games in 1968.

Connor worked as a manufacturers' representative in Chicago after his retirement from the NFL. He died in Evanston, Illinois on March 31, 2003, aged 78 after a long illness. He was buried at All Saints Cemetery in Des Plaines.
