= Dick Barwegen =

American football player (1921–1966)

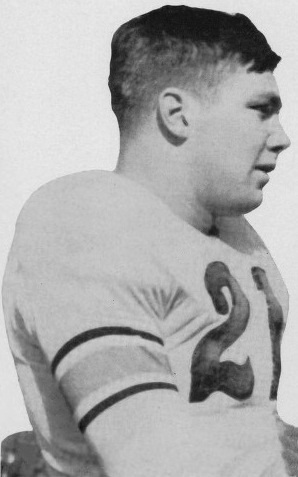
- Barwegan from 1944 Purdue yearbook

No. 31, 21, 6, 26, 61, 41
- Position: Guard

Personal information
- Born: December 25, 1921; Chicago, Illinois, U.S.
- Died: September 3, 1966 (aged 44); Baltimore, Maryland, U.S.
- Listed height: 6 ft 1 in (1.85 m)
- Listed weight: 227 lb (103 kg)

Career information
- High school: Fenger Academy (Chicago)
- College: Purdue (1941–1943, 1946)
- NFL draft: 1945: 6th round, 44th overall pick

Career history
- New York Yankees (1947); Baltimore Colts (1948–1949); Chicago Bears (1950–1952); Baltimore Colts (1953–1954); Ottawa Rough Riders (1955)

Awards and highlights
- 4× First-team All-Pro (1948–1951); Second-team All-Pro (1947); 4× Pro Bowl (1950–1953); NFL 1950s All-Decade Team; 100 greatest Bears of All-Time; 2× First-team All-Big Ten (1943, 1946)

Career NFL/AAFC statistics
- Games played: 92
- Games started: 83
- Fumble recoveries: 3
- Stats at Pro Football Reference

Richard J. Barwegen (December 25, 1921 – September 3, 1966) was an American professional football player who was an offensive lineman for five seasons in the National Football League (NFL). He was selected to four Pro Bowls during his career. He is one of only four members of the NFL 1950s All-Decade Team to not be in the Pro Football Hall of Fame. The Professional Football Researchers Association named Barwegan to the PRFA Hall of Very Good Class of 2008.

== Career ==
Barwegen was drafted in the sixth round of the 1945 NFL draft by the Brooklyn Tigers, who soon merged with the Boston Yanks, though he never played a down with them, playing with the AAFC New York Yankees before playing for the first incarnation of the Baltimore Colts for two seasons, long enough for them to join the NFL. But Barwegen was traded by Abe Watner to the Bears for George Blanda, Bob Perina, Ernie Zalejski, Jimmy "Tank" Crawford, and Bob Jensen. After three seasons with the Bears, he played with the new incarnation of the Baltimore Colts in their first season and went to his fourth straight Pro Bowl, his last. After one more season with the Colts, he left to play with the Ottawa Rough Riders, before retiring. Barwegan was 2nd Team AAFC All Pro in 1947, consensus 1st Team AAFC All Pro in 1948 and 1949, consensus 1st Team NFL All Pro in 1950 and 1951, and 2nd Team NFL All Pro in 1952.
