= 1949 All-Pro Team =

Official list of the best NFL players in 1949

The 1949 All-Pro Team consisted of American football players who were chosen by various selectors for the All-Pro team for the 1949 football season. Teams were selected by, among others, the Associated Press (AP), the United Press (UP), and the New York Daily News. The AP selections included players from the National Football League (NFL) and All-America Football Conference; the UP and NYDN selections were limited to players from the NFL.

== Selections ==
Position	Player	Team	Selector(s)
Quarterback	Bob Waterfield	Los Angeles Rams	AP-1 [back], UP-1
Quarterback	Otto Graham	Cleveland Browns	AP-1
Quarterback	Tommy Thompson	Philadelphia Eagles	UP-2
Halfback	Steve Van Buren	Philadelphia Eagles	AP-1, UP-1
Halfback	Tony Canadeo	Green Bay Packers	UP-1
Halfback	Gene Roberts	New York Giants	UP-2
Halfback	Elmer Angsman	Chicago Cardinals	UP-2
Fullback	Chet Mutryn	Buffalo Bills	AP-1
Fullback	Pat Harder	Chicago Cardinals	UP-1
Fullback	Dick Hoerner	Los Angeles Rams	UP-2
End	Pete Pihos	Philadelphia Eagles	AP-1, UP-1
End	Mac Speedie	Cleveland Browns	AP-1
End	Tom Fears	Los Angeles Rams	UP-1
End	Ed Sprinkle	Chicago Bears	UP-2
End	Jim Keane	Chicago Bears	UP-2
Tackle	Dick Huffman	Los Angeles Rams	AP-1, UP-1
Tackle	Arnie Weinmeister	New York Yankees	AP-1
Tackle	Vic Sears	Philadelphia Eagles	UP-1
Tackle	George Connor	Chicago Bears	UP-2
Tackle	Dick Wildung	Green Bay Packers	UP-2
Guard	Buster Ramsey	Chicago Cardinals	AP-1, UP-1
Guard	Dick Barwegan	Baltimore Colts	AP-1
Guard	Ray Bray	Chicago Bears	UP-1
Guard	Frank Kilroy	Philadelphia Eagles	UP-2
Guard	Cliff Patton	Philadelphia Eagles	UP-2
Center	Fred Naumetz	Los Angeles Rams	AP-1, UP-1
Center	Vince Banonis	Chicago Cardinals	UP-2
