= Arnie Weinmeister =

Canadian gridiron football player (1923–2000)

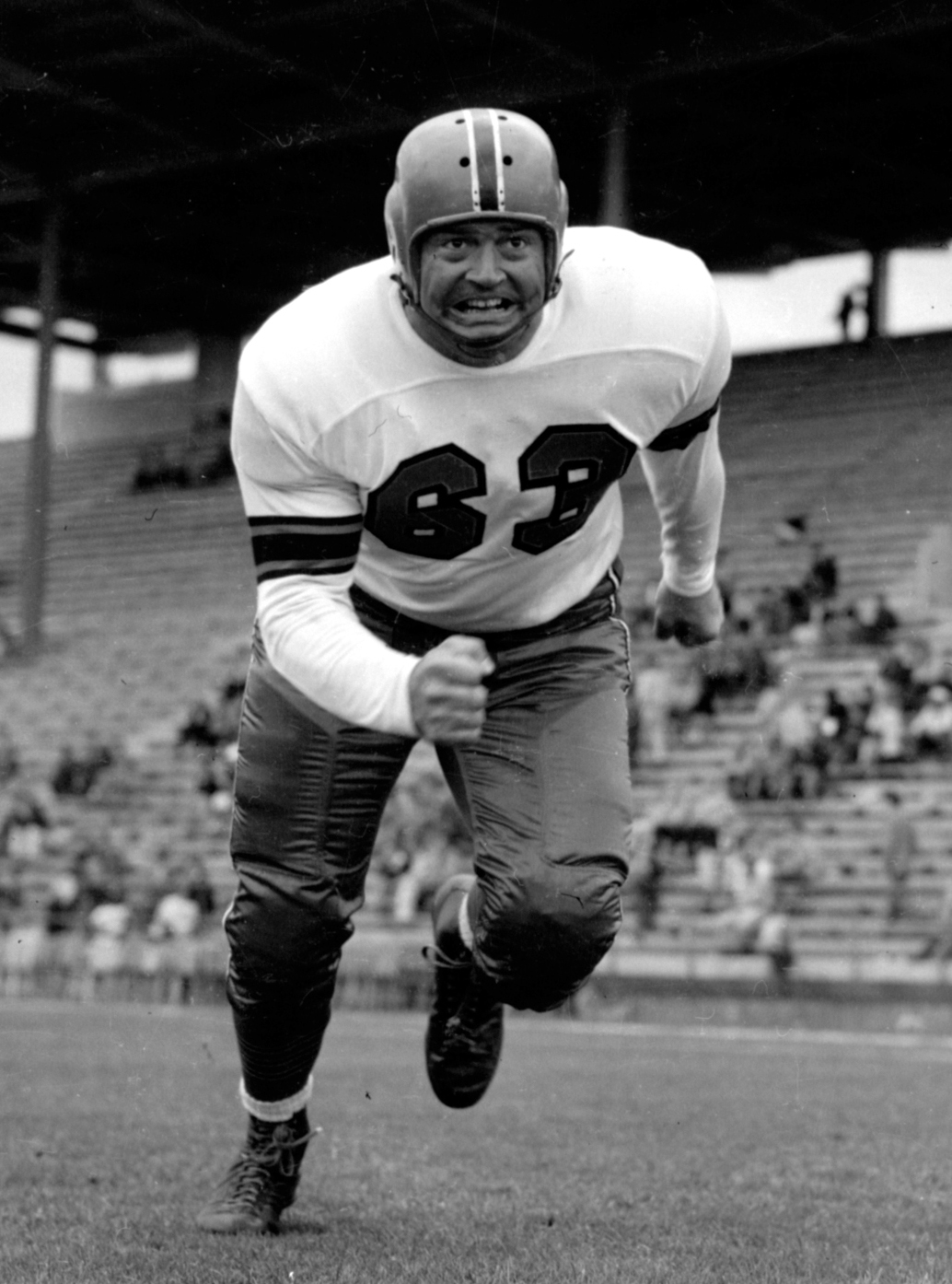
- Weinmeister with the BC Lions in 1954

No. 44, 73, 63
- Position: Defensive tackle

Personal information
- Born: March 23, 1923; Rhein, Saskatchewan, Canada
- Died: June 28, 2000 (aged 77); Seattle, Washington, U.S.
- Listed height: 6 ft 4 in (1.93 m)
- Listed weight: 235 lb (107 kg)

Career information
- High school: Jefferson (Portland, Oregon)
- College: Washington (1941–1942, 1946–1947)
- NFL draft: 1945: 17th round, 166th overall pick

Career history
- New York/Brooklyn-New York Yankees (1948–1949); New York Giants (1950–1953); BC Lions (1954–1955)

Awards and highlights
- 4× First-team All-Pro (1950–1953); 4× Pro Bowl (1950–1953); First-team All-AAFC (1949); Second-team All-AAFC (1948); 21st greatest New York Giant of all-time

Career NFL/AAFC statistics
- Games played: 71
- Games started: 65
- Fumble recoveries: 8
- Stats at Pro Football Reference
- Pro Football Hall of Fame

Arnold George Weinmeister (March 23, 1923 – June 28, 2000) was a Canadian professional football player who was a defensive tackle in the All-America Football Conference (AAFC), National Football League (NFL), and Western Interprovincial Football Union (WIFU). Renowned for his speed as a lineman, he went to four Pro Bowls in a six-year combined tenure in the AAFC and NFL. Weinmeister was inducted into the Pro Football Hall of Fame in 1984, becoming the second Canadian to receive the honor; his six seasons is among the shortest for an inductee. He also played in the WIFU in Canada for two seasons.

== Early life ==
He was born in Rhein, Saskatchewan. His family moved from the village to Portland, Oregon before eventually settling in Seattle, Washington.

Weinmeister was a two-time All-City tackle in high school, and played end, fullback and tackle during a 4-year tenure at the University of Washington which was interrupted by four years of army service. He was scouted by New York Yankees (AAFC) head coach Ray Flaherty while playing fullback.

== Professional career ==
Weinmeister turned professional in 1948 and was a two-way tackle for the New York Yankees in the All-America Football Conference until 1949. He mostly played defensive tackle for the New York Giants from 1950 to 1953. During his final season in New York, he served as the team captain. In 1949, Weinmeister won second-team All-AAFC as a rookie followed by first-team All-AAFC honors, was voted All-NFL Choice for four consecutive years (1950–1953), and was selected to play in the NFL's Pro Bowl every year from 1950 to 1953.

He was on the inaugural roster for the BC Lions in 1954, having accepted their offer of $15,000, $3,000 more than the Giants paid him. He played for the team for two seasons. He is one of five Saskatchewan natives to make it to the NFL (the other four being Jon Ryan, Rueben Mayes, Ben Heenan, and Brett Jones).

In 1984, Weinmeister was announced as part of the class for the Pro Football Hall of Fame; Weinmeister publicly thanked Tom Landry, who was a vocal advocate for Weinmeister. In 2024, in celebration of the 100th season of the Giants, the team announced the top 100 players in franchise history, with Weinmeister being ranked 21st.

== Personal life ==
After he retired from football, Weinmeister became an organizer for the International Brotherhood of Teamsters, having joined the Teamsters as a warehouseman in college. By the 1980s, he was the director of the Seattle-based Western Conference of Teamsters and served as the union's vice president. He was also president of Joint Council 28, covering locals in Washington, northern Idaho and Alaska, and was secretary-treasury of Local 117 in Seattle before retiring in 1992; the Justice Department filed a lawsuit to try to remove senior leadership such as Weinmeister in 1988 that tried to link the group to organized crime but he stayed in office.

Weinmeister had four children with his first wife and later married Joey. He died of congestive heart failure on June 28, 2000 at the age of 77.
