= Dick Huffman =

American football player (1923–1992)

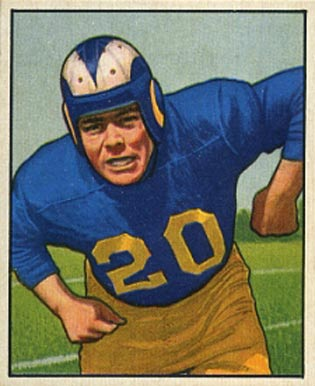
- Huffman on a 1950 Bowman football card

No. 20, 65, 60
- Position: Tackle

Personal information
- Born: March 27, 1923; Charleston, West Virginia, U.S.
- Died: September 13, 1992 (aged 69); Charleston, West Virginia, U.S.
- Listed height: 6 ft 2 in (1.88 m)
- Listed weight: 255 lb (116 kg)

Career information
- High school: Charleston
- College: Tennessee (1942, 1946)
- NFL draft: 1945: 9th round, 81st overall pick

Career history
- Los Angeles Rams (1947–1950); Winnipeg Blue Bombers (1951–1955); Calgary Stampeders (1956–1957)

Awards and highlights
- 3× First-team All-Pro (1947–1949); Second-team All-Pro (1950); Pro Bowl (1950); 6× CFL West All-Star (1952–1957); Consensus All-American (1946); First-team All-SEC (1946)

Career NFL statistics
- Games played: 47
- Games started: 46
- Fumble recoveries: 6
- Stats at Pro Football Reference
- Canadian Football Hall of Fame

Richard Maxwell Huffman (March 27, 1923 – September 13, 1992) was an American professional football player who was a tackle in the National Football League (NFL) and the Canadian Western Interprovincial Football Union (WIFU).

A 9th round selection (81st overall pick) of the 1945 NFL draft, Huffman played four seasons for the Los Angeles Rams (1947–1950). He then went to the WIFU (a precursor to the CFL's Western Conference) where he played for seven seasons for the Winnipeg Blue Bombers (1951–1955) and the Calgary Stampeders (1956–1957).

While still playing pro football, he began a career as a professional wrestler in the offseason.

In 1987, he was inducted into the Canadian Football Hall of Fame.
