= Block O =

Ohio State University student organisation

- Established: 1938
- Founders: Clancy Isaac
- Location: Columbus, Ohio
- Website: www.blocko.org

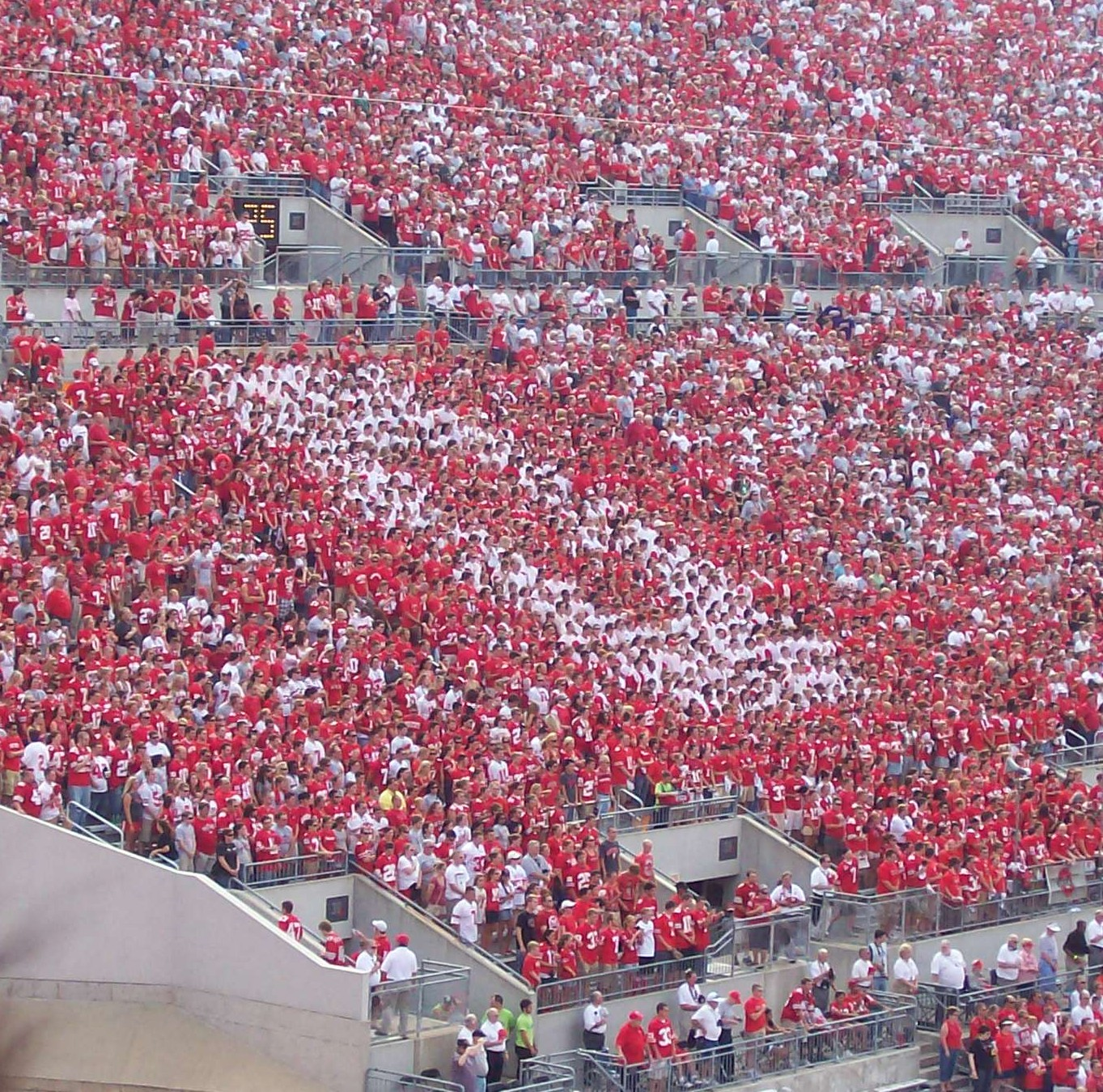
Block O at a 2007 Buckeyes football game

Block O is a student organization on the campus of Ohio State University and also serves as the official student cheering section of the Ohio State Buckeyes. Founded in 1938, Block O has grown to become the largest student organization on the campus of the Ohio State University.

== History ==
Block O was founded in 1938 by OSU cheerleader Clancy Isaac. Prior to stadium renovations, Block O resided in the north end zone of Ohio Stadium, but has since been relocated to section 39A which is in the south stands. In 2008, Block O North returned, which resided in section 1A/2A. Block O North featured the use of capes while Block O South performed card stunts. In 2025, they were rejoined in the south end zone as one group.

Block O sections of the stadium are for students only and annually sell out their 2,083 ticket allotment within minutes of ticket sales window opening. While seating is limited to this number, membership in the organization exceeds 2,500 students. Block "O" leads Ohio Stadium in many cheers and songs including Stadium OHIO and the O-H-I-O cheer, which was also started by Clancy Isaac.

Since its inception, Block O has added several extensions to help meet student demand for other Ohio State sports. These groups include the Buckeye Nuthouse (men's basketball), Buckeye Sluggers (baseball), Knucklebucks (men's ice hockey), Connor's Crew (men's soccer), Block O Volleyball, Block O Gymnastics, Block O Tennis, Block O Lacrosse, Block O women's basketball, and Block O Wrestling.
