= Izidor Šušteršič =

Slovenian snowboarder (born 1977)

Izidor Šušteršič (born 18 February 1977) is a Slovenian snowboarder. He competed at the 2006 Winter Olympics in Turin, Italy, and at the 2010 Winter Olympics in Vancouver, Canada, where he finished 21st and 25th in Parallel Giant Slalom, respectively. Šušteršič also qualified for the 2014 Winter Olympics in Sochi, Russia.
