= Bob Jensen (American football) =

American football player (1925–2015)

- Jensen c. 1949

No. 57, 54
- Positions: End, defensive end

Personal information
- Born: December 29, 1925; Chicago, Illinois, U.S.
- Died: October 8, 2015 (aged 89); Rancho Mirage, California, U.S.
- Listed height: 6 ft 2 in (1.88 m)
- Listed weight: 220 lb (100 kg)

Career information
- High school: Lane Tech (Chicago)
- College: Iowa State (1946–1947)
- NFL draft: 1948: 13th round, 109 (Note: He was re-drafted by the Washington Redskins in 1951 / Round: 10 / Pick: 113)th overall pick

Career history
- Chicago Rockets / Hornets (1948–1949); Baltimore Colts (1950)

Career AAFC/NFL statistics
- Receptions: 22
- Receiving yards: 290
- Receiving touchdowns: 1
- Stats at Pro Football Reference

Robert Peter Jensen (December 29, 1925 – October 8, 2015) was an American football end and defensive end who played for three seasons in the All-America Football Conference (AAFC) and then in the National Football League (NFL).

== Early life ==
Jensen was born in 1925 in Chicago, Illinois, and attended Lane Tech College Prep High School. He was captain of the Lane Tech football team and selected for all-Chicago honors in 1943. He served in the U.S. Navy after high school.

== College career ==
After the Navy, he attended Iowa State University—then known as Iowa State College of Agriculture and Mechanic Arts—and played college football for the Iowa State Cyclones in 1946 and 1947. In 1947, he ranked fifth in the Big Six Conference with 11 receptions for 212 yards.

== Professional career ==
He was selected by the Boston Yanks in the 13th round with the 109th overall pick of the 1948 NFL draft, but he instead took a job with the Carnegie Illinois Steel Company upon graduation. He signed in July 1948 with the Chicago Rockets of the All-America Football Conference (AAFC). He played for the Rockets and the Chicago Hornets in 1948 and 1949, and in the National Football League (NFL) for the Baltimore Colts during the 1950 season. He appeared in a total of 34 AAFC and NFL games and had 22 receptions for 290 yards and one touchdown.

== Death ==
He died in 2015 at age 89 in Rancho Mirage, California.
