= Marion Motley =

American football player (1920–1999)

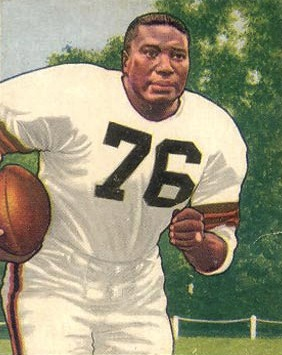
- Motley on a 1950 Bowman football card

No. 76, 36
- Positions: Fullback, linebacker

Personal information
- Born: June 5, 1920; Leesburg, Georgia, U.S.
- Died: June 27, 1999 (aged 79); Cleveland, Ohio, U.S.
- Listed height: 6 ft 1 in (1.85 m)
- Listed weight: 232 lb (105 kg)

Career information
- High school: Canton McKinley (Canton, Ohio)
- College: South Carolina State (1939–1940); Nevada (1941–1942)
- NFL draft: 1946: undrafted

Career history
- Cleveland Browns (1946–1953); Pittsburgh Steelers (1955)

Awards and highlights
- NFL champion (1950); 4× AAFC champion (1946–1949); 2× First-team All-Pro (1948, 1950); 2× Second-team All-Pro (1946, 1947); Pro Bowl (1950); NFL rushing yards leader (1950); AAFC rushing yards leader (1948); AAFC rushing touchdowns co-leader (1949); NFL 1940s All-Decade Team; NFL 75th Anniversary All-Time Team; NFL 100th Anniversary All-Time Team; Cleveland Browns Ring of Honor; Nevada Wolf Pack No. 41 retired; NFL record: Highest yards per carry over 1,000 rushing attempts (5.7)

Career AAFC/NFL statistics
- Rushing yards: 4,720
- Rushing average: 5.7
- Rushing touchdowns: 31
- Receptions: 85
- Receiving yards: 1,107
- Receiving touchdowns: 7
- Military career
- Allegiance: United States
- Branch: United States Navy
- Service years: 1944–1945
- Unit: Great Lakes Naval Station
- Stats at Pro Football Reference
- Pro Football Hall of Fame

Marion Motley (June 5, 1920 – June 27, 1999) was an American professional football player who was a fullback and linebacker for the Cleveland Browns in the All-America Football Conference (AAFC) and the National Football League (NFL). He was a leading blocker and rusher in the late 1940s and early 1950s, and ended his career with an average of 5.7 yards per carry, a record for running backs that still stands. A versatile player who possessed both quickness and size, Motley was a force on both offense and defense. Fellow Hall of Fame fullback Joe Perry once called Motley "the greatest all-around football player there ever was".

Motley was also one of the first two African-Americans to play professional football in the modern era, breaking the color barrier along with teammate Bill Willis in September 1946, when the two played their first game for the Browns.

Motley grew up in Canton, Ohio. He played football through high school and at Nevada from 1940 to 1942, before enlisting in the military during World War II. While training in the U.S. Navy in 1944, he played for a service team coached by Paul Brown. Following the war, he then went back to work in Canton. Paul Brown invited Motley to try out for the Cleveland Browns, a team he was coaching in the newly formed AAFC pro football league. Motley made the Browns in 1946, and became a cornerstone of Cleveland's success in the late 1940s. The team won four AAFC championships before the league dissolved, and the Browns were absorbed by the more established NFL. Motley was the AAFC's leading rusher in 1948, and the NFL leader in 1950, when the Browns won another championship.

Motley and fellow black teammate Bill Willis contended with racism throughout their careers. Although the color barrier was broken in all major American sports by 1950, the men endured shouted insults on the field and racial discrimination off of it. "They found out that while they were calling us niggers and alligator bait, I was running for touchdowns and Willis was knocking the shit out of them", Motley once said. "So they stopped calling us names and started trying to catch up with us." Focused exclusively on winning, Brown did not tolerate racism within the team.

Slowed by knee injuries, Motley left the Browns after the 1953 season. He attempted a comeback in 1955 as a linebacker for the Pittsburgh Steelers but was released before the end of the year. He then pursued a coaching career, but was turned away by the Browns and other teams he approached. He attributed his trouble finding a job in football to racial discrimination, questioning whether teams were ready to hire a black coach. Motley was elected to the Pro Football Hall of Fame in 1968.

== Early years and college career ==
Motley was born in Leesburg, Georgia, and raised in Canton, Ohio, where his family moved when he was three years old. After going to elementary and junior high schools in Canton, Motley attended Canton McKinley High School, where he played on the football and basketball teams. He was especially good as a football fullback, and the McKinley Bulldogs posted a win–loss record of 25–3 during his tenure there. The team's three losses all came against Canton's chief rivals, a Massillon Washington High School team led by coach Paul Brown.

After he graduated, Motley enrolled in 1939 at South Carolina State College, a historically black school in Orangeburg, South Carolina. He transferred before his sophomore year to the University of Nevada, where he was a star on the football team between 1941 and 1943. As a punishing fullback for the Wolf Pack, Motley played against powerful West Coast teams including USF, Santa Clara, and St. Mary's. He suffered a knee injury in 1943 and returned to Canton to work after dropping out of school.

== Military and professional career ==
As United States involvement in World War II intensified, Motley joined the U.S. Navy in 1944 and was sent to the Great Lakes Naval Training Station. There he played for the Great Lakes Navy Bluejackets, a military team coached by Paul Brown, who was serving in the Navy during an extended leave from his job as head coach of Ohio State University's football team. Motley played fullback and linebacker at Great Lakes, and was an important component of the team's offense and defense. The highlight of his time at Great Lakes was a 39–7 victory over Notre Dame in 1945. Motley was eligible for discharge before the game – it was the final match of the season and the last military game of World War II – but he stayed on to play. Motley put up an impressive performance, thanks in part to Brown's experimentation with a new play: a delayed handoff later called the draw play.

After the war, Motley went back to Canton and began working at a steel mill, planning to return to Reno in 1946 to finish his college degree. That summer, however, Paul Brown was coaching a team in the new All-America Football Conference (AAFC) called the Cleveland Browns. Motley wrote to Brown asking for a tryout, but Brown declined, saying he already had all the fullbacks he needed. At the beginning of August, however, Brown invited Bill Willis, another African-American star, to try out for the team at its training camp in Bowling Green, Ohio. Ten days later, Brown invited Motley to come, too. "I think they felt [Willis] needed a roommate," Motley later said. "I don't think they felt I'd make the team. I'm glad I was able to fool them."

Both Motley and Willis made the team and became two of the first African-Americans to play professional football in the modern era. The Los Angeles Rams of the National Football League had signed the only other black players in pro football earlier that year: Kenny Washington and Woody Strode. The four men broke football's color barrier a seven months before Jackie Robinson was promoted from the Class AAA Montreal Royals to join the Brooklyn Dodgers in 1947. Motley felt the Browns would likely be his only opportunity to make a career of football. "I knew this was the one big chance in my life to rise above the steel mill existence, and I really wanted to take it," he said.

Motley was signed to a contract worth $4,500 a year ($74,296 in 2025 dollars). With the Browns, he joined a potent offense led by quarterback Otto Graham, tackle and placekicker Lou Groza and receivers Dante Lavelli and Mac Speedie. He was a force to be reckoned with in the AAFC, and helped the team win every championship in the league's four years of existence between 1946 and 1949. He had a combination of quickness and power – he was listed at 238 pounds – that helped him plow through tacklers. He was also an able pass blocker and played on defense as a linebacker. Motley rushed for an average of 8.2 yards per carry in his first season. His forte was the trap play, a scheme where a defensive lineman was allowed to come across the line of scrimmage unblocked, opening up space for Motley to run. He led the league in rushing in 1948 as the Browns posted a perfect 15–0 record. He was the AAFC's all-time rushing leader when the league folded after the 1949 season and the Browns were absorbed into the more established National Football League (NFL). The Browns had a 47–4–3 overall regular-season win-loss-tie record during the AAFC years as Motley rushed for a total of 3,024 yards. In five AAFC playoff games for the Browns (all victories), Motley ran for a combined total of 453 yards with five touchdowns, recording 100-yard games in the Championship twice.

Like other black players in the 1940s and 1950s, Motley faced racist attitudes both on and off the field. Paul Brown would not tolerate discrimination within the team; he wanted to win and would not let anything get in his way. Motley and Willis, however, were sometimes stepped on and called names during games. "Sometimes I wanted to just kill some of those guys, and the officials would just stand right there," Motley said many years later. "They'd see those guys stepping on us and heard them saying things and just turn their backs. That kind of crap went on for two or three years until they found out what kind of players we were." Motley and Willis did not travel to one game against the Miami Seahawks in the Browns' early years after they received threatening letters. Another time in Miami, Motley and Willis were told they were not welcome at the hotel where the team was staying. Brown threatened to relocate the entire team, and the hotel's management backed down.

Attitudes toward race in America began to change after the war, which had caused social and political upheaval and prompted people to think about the future with more ambition and confidence. Although progress was slow and racially motivated hostility continued for many years, the color barrier was broken in all major sports by 1950. Many of Motley and Willis's teammates on the Browns were used to playing with black players in college, where teams were integrated across most of the country. The presence of Motley and Willis, meanwhile, contributed to strong attendance at many of the Browns' early games as large black audiences came to watch them. By one estimate, 10,000 black fans saw the Browns play their first game.

Aided by Motley's swiftness and size, the Browns won the NFL championship in 1950, their first season in the league. In October 1950, Motley set an NFL record that stood for more than 52 years when he averaged over 17 yards per rush against the Pittsburgh Steelers, with 188 yards on 11 carries. In December 2002, quarterback Michael Vick of the Atlanta Falcons rushed for 173 yards on 10 carries against the Minnesota Vikings, eclipsing Motley's average. Motley also had a 69-yard rushing and 33-yard receiving touchdowns in the game. While Motley did not factor in the Browns' championship game win against the Los Angeles Rams, he led the league in rushing with 810 yards in 1950 despite averaging fewer than 12 carries per game. He was a unanimous first-team All-Pro selection.

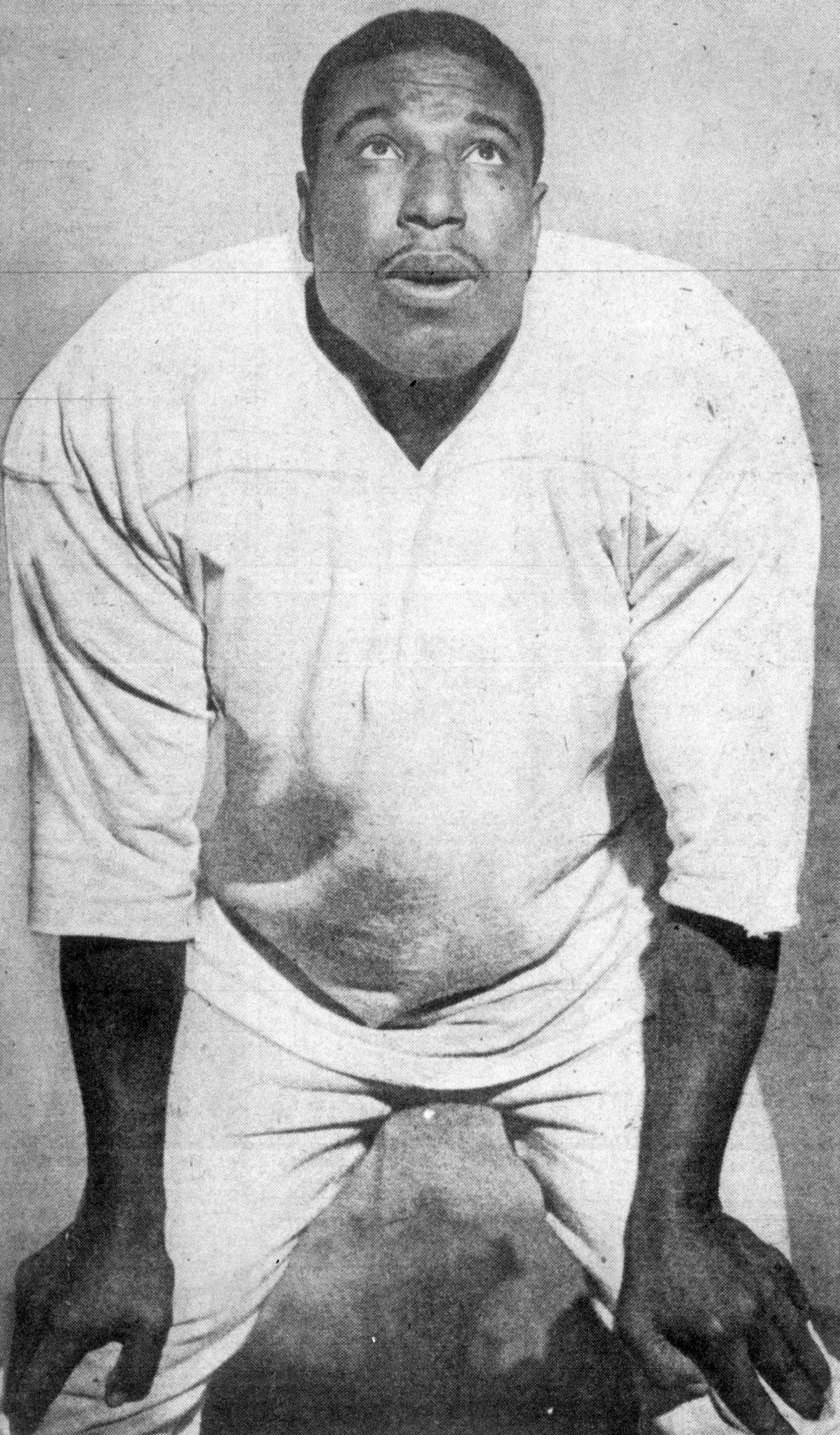
Motley in 1951

By the 1951 season, Motley started to feel the physical effects of his hard-hitting, up-the-middle running style. He suffered a knee injury in training camp, and he was getting older; by the time the season was in full swing, he was 31. Motley only ran for 273 yards and one touchdown that year, an uncharacteristically low total. Despite Motley's troubles, the Browns made the championship game again after winning the American Conference with an 11–1 record. Cleveland, however, lost the title game to the Rams, 24–17. Motley had just five carries and 23 yards.

Motley's knees continued to bother him in 1952. While he showed occasional signs of his old form that season, it became clear to the Browns' coaching staff that he was no longer in his prime. Motley finished the year with 444 yards of rushing and 4.3 yards per carry, a career low. The Browns finished with an 8–4 record but still captured the conference title and secured another spot in the NFL championship game. Motley performed well in that matchup against the Detroit Lions, rushing for 95 yards. The Browns, however, lost 17–7.

The 1953 season was no better for Motley, whose effectiveness was again limited by injury. Cleveland finished with an 11–1 record and faced Detroit in the championship for the second year in a row. As Motley's production declined, the Browns relied on Otto Graham's passing to Lavelli and receiver Ray Renfro, who also lined up as a running back. Motley did not participate in the championship game that year, another loss to the Lions.

Motley thought he could come back and play a ninth season in 1954, and showed up to training camp to prove it. Paul Brown, however, thought otherwise. Dogged by injuries and 34 years old, Motley quit before the season began, after Brown said he would otherwise be cut from the team. "Marion realized that his knee was weak and did not feel that it was coming around," Brown said at the time. "He was one of the truly fine fullbacks in his prime, the type that comes along once in a lifetime. I certainly never will forget some of his runs and I imagine Cleveland football fans feel the same."

Motley took the 1954 season off and attempted a comeback in 1955 after the Browns, who still had rights to Motley under his contract, traded him to the Pittsburgh Steelers for Ed Modzelewski. In Pittsburgh he played seven games as a linebacker, but the Steelers released him before the end of the season. In his eight years in the AAFC and NFL, Motley had rushed for 4,720 yards and averaged 5.7 yards per carry. His career rushing average is still an all-time record for running backs.

== Later life and death ==
After ending his playing career for good, Motley asked Brown about a coaching job with the team. Brown, however, rejected his overtures, saying Motley should instead look for work at a steel mill – the very career football was his ticket out of. Unable to find coaching opportunities in the NFL, he worked as a whisky salesman in the early 1960s. He got occasional scouting assignments from the Browns, but as the Civil Rights Movement began to coalesce in 1965, he issued a statement saying he had been refused a permanent coaching position by the team numerous times. He applied for a coaching job in 1964, he wrote, and was told that there were no vacancies. The Browns then hired Bob Nussbaumer as an assistant. "When I heard of the hiring of a new assistant, I began to wonder if the full reason is whether or not the time is ripe to hire a Negro coach in Cleveland on the professional level," he wrote. Art Modell, the Browns' owner, responded by saying the team filled its coaching positions based on ability and experience, not race. "We are represented by scouts at every major Negro school. And we now have 12 Negroes signed for the 1965 season," he said.

Motley asked Otto Graham for a job with the Washington Redskins when Graham was head coach there in the late 1960s, but he was again turned away. Motley also signed on to coach an all-girl professional football team called the Cleveland Dare Devils in 1967. By 1969, the team had only played a few exhibition games as Cleveland theatrical agent Syd Freedman struggled to drum up interest in a women's league. Later in life, Motley worked for the U.S. postal service in Cleveland, Harry Miller Excavating in Suffield, Ohio, the Ohio Lottery and for the Ohio Department of Youth Services in Akron. He died in 1999, at age 79, of prostate cancer.

== Honors and legacy ==
In 1968, Motley became the second black player voted into the Pro Football Hall of Fame, located in his hometown of Canton. Having played successfully as a fullback and pass blocker on offense and as a linebacker on defense, he is seen as one of the best all-around players in football history. Blanton Collier, an assistant who took over as the team's head coach after Paul Brown's firing in 1963, said Motley "had no equal as a blocker. He could run with anybody for 30 yards or so. And this man was a great, great linebacker."

Most of Motley's runs were trap plays up the middle, but he had the speed to run outside. "There's no telling how much yardage I might have made if I ran as much as some backs do now," he once said. Running back Jim Brown surpassed Motley's rushing records in the early 1960s, but many of Motley's coaches and fellow players regarded Motley as the better player, in part because of his strength as a blocker. "There is no comparison between Jim Brown and Marion Motley," Graham said at a luncheon in Canton in 1964. "Motley was the greatest all-around fullback."

In his books The Thinking Man's Guide to Pro Football and The New Thinking Man's Guide To Pro Football, football writer Paul Zimmerman of Sports Illustrated called Motley the best player in the history of the sport. He was named to the NFL's 75th Anniversary All-Time Team in 1994.

In November 2019, Motley was selected as one of the twelve running backs on the NFL 100 All-Time Team.

== NFL career statistics ==
Legend
	Won NFL Championship or AAFC Championship
	Led the league
	NFL or AAFC record
**Bold**	Career high

Year	Team	Games		Rushing						Receiving					Fumbles	
Year	Team	GP	GS	Att	Yds	Avg	Y/G	Lng	TD	Rec	Yds	Avg	Lng	TD	Fum	FR
1946	CLE	13	10	73	601	**8.2**	46.2	**76**	5	10	188	**18.8**	63	1	0	0
1947	CLE	**14**	12	146	889	6.1	63.5	50	**8**	7	73	10.4	–	1	0	0
1948	CLE	**14**	**14**	**157**	**964**	6.1	**68.9**	–	5	13	192	14.8	**78**	**2**	–	–
1949	CLE	11	10	113	570	5.0	51.8	–	**8**	**15**	191	12.7	–	0	–	–
1950	CLE	12	12	140	810	5.8	67.5	69	3	11	151	13.7	41	1	**5**	**3**
1951	CLE	11	10	61	273	4.5	24.8	26	1	10	52	5.2	34	0	1	0
1952	CLE	12	10	104	444	4.3	37.0	59	1	13	**213**	16.4	68	**2**	2	1
1953	CLE	12	0	32	161	5.0	13.4	34	0	6	47	7.8	23	0	1	0
1955	PIT	6	0	2	8	4.0	1.3	8	0	0	0	0.0	0	0	0	0
Career		105	78	828	4,720	5.7	45.0	76	31	85	1,107	13.0	78	7	9	4
