= Mac Speedie =

American football player (1920–1993)

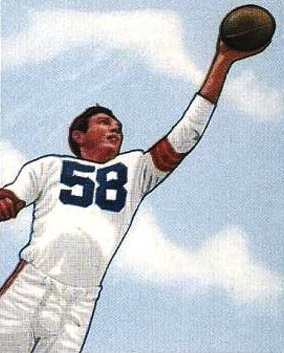
- Speedie on a 1950 Bowman football card

No. 58, 88, 75, 70
- Position: End

Personal information
- Born: January 12, 1920; Odell, Illinois, U.S.
- Died: March 5, 1993 (aged 73); Laguna Hills, California, U.S.
- Listed height: 6 ft 3 in (1.91 m)
- Listed weight: 203 lb (92 kg)

Career information
- High school: South (Salt Lake City, Utah)
- College: Utah (1938–1941)
- NFL draft: 1942: 15th round, 135th overall pick

Career history

Playing
- Cleveland Browns (1946–1952); Saskatchewan Roughriders (1953–1954); BC Lions (1955)

Coaching
- Houston Oilers (1960–1961) Ends coach; Denver Broncos (1964–1966) Head coach

Awards and highlights
- As a player: NFL champion (1950); 4× AAFC champion (1946–1949); 3× First-team All-Pro (1947–1949); 2× Second-team All-Pro (1950, 1952); 2× Pro Bowl (1950, 1952); 2× WIFU All-Star (1953–1954); 3× AAFC receptions leader (1947–1949); AAFC receiving yards leader (1947, 1949); NFL receptions leader (1952); NFL 1940s All-Decade Team; Cleveland Browns Ring of Honor; As a coach: AFL champion (1960); AAFC record: Most receiving yards in a season: 1,146 (1947)

Career AAFC/NFL statistics
- Receptions: 349
- Receiving yards: 5,602
- Receiving touchdowns: 33
- Stats at Pro Football Reference

Head coaching record
- Career: 6–19–1 (.250)
- Coaching profile at Pro Football Reference
- Pro Football Hall of Fame

Mac Curtis Speedie (January 12, 1920 – March 5, 1993) was an American professional football end who played for the Cleveland Browns in the All-America Football Conference (AAFC) and the National Football League (NFL) for seven years before joining the Saskatchewan Roughriders in Canada. He later served for two years as head coach of the American Football League's Denver Broncos. A tall and quick runner whose awkward gait helped him deceive defenders and get open, Speedie led his league in receptions four times during his career and was selected as a first-team All-Pro six times. His career average of 800 yards per season was not surpassed until two decades after his retirement, and his per-game average of 50 yards went unequalled for 20 years after he left the game.

Speedie grew up in Utah, where he overcame Perthes Disease to become a standout as a hurdler on his high school track team and a halfback on the football team. He attended the University of Utah, where he continued to excel at track and football before entering the military in 1942 during World War II. He spent four years in the service before joining the Browns in 1946, where he played as an end opposite quarterback Otto Graham, fullback Marion Motley and fellow receiver Dante Lavelli. The Browns, a new team in the AAFC, won the league championship every year between 1946 and 1949. The Browns merged into the NFL in 1950 after the AAFC disbanded, and Speedie continued to succeed as the team won another league championship. After two more years with the Browns, however, Speedie left the team for the Western Interprovincial Football Union (WIFU) amid a conflict with Paul Brown, Cleveland's head coach. He played two full seasons in the WIFU and one game in a third season before leaving professional football.

Speedie was hired in 1960 as an end coach for the Houston Oilers in the American Football League (AFL). The Oilers won the AFL championship that year, but Speedie left in 1961 after the head coach, former teammate Lou Rymkus, was fired. He then took a job as an assistant for the AFL's Denver Broncos and was promoted to head coach in 1964. His two-year run with the team was unsuccessful, however. After his resignation in 1966, Speedie became a scout for the Broncos, a job he kept until his retirement in 1982. He was inducted into the Pro Football Hall of Fame of 2020.

== Early life ==
Speedie was born in Odell, Illinois, but attended high school in Utah. As a child he had Perthes Disease, a condition where growth or loss of bone mass in the hip joint affects blood supply to the area. He had to wear a brace for four years to correct the condition; one of his legs came out shorter than the other. Despite his struggle with the disease, Speedie became a star athlete at South High School in Salt Lake City, playing football, basketball and track. He was the center on the school's basketball team and was named to a list of Salt Lake's best athletes as a halfback on the football team. Getting out of the braces "was like turning a frisky colt out to pasture after a year in a box stall", Speedie once said. "I had such a backlog of athletic ambition that I wanted to play football, basketball, and track all at one time."

== College and military career ==
After graduating from high school, Speedie attended the University of Utah, where he majored in geology and continued to excel as an athlete. He played football and basketball and was a top college hurdler in track. As an end on the Utah Redskins football team, he won all-conference honors in 1939, 1940 and 1941. In track, he finished second in a high hurdles event where the winner, Rice University's Fred Wolcott, set an NCAA record.

Like many college athletes, Speedie joined the military as America's involvement in World War II intensified following the attack on Pearl Harbor at the end of 1941. He entered the U.S. Army after graduating in 1942. Speedie was stationed at Fort Warren in Wyoming and played for the base's Broncos military team.

== Professional career ==
=== Cleveland Browns ===
Speedie was drafted by the National Football League's Detroit Lions in the 15th round of the 1942 draft. Fred Mandel, the owner of the Lions, visited him at Fort Warren and offered a contract worth $2,800 a year. Speedie wanted to sign immediately, but Mandel preferred to wait until after the war. By the time the war drew to a close in 1945, however, Speedie was considering signing with the Chicago Rockets, a team in the new All-America Football Conference (AAFC). He was pursued by the Rockets after playing well against a team at Marine Corps Air Station El Toro from which many of the Rockets' players were drawn. Speedie was also spotted by Paul Brown, who had been the head coach of a military team at Great Lakes Naval Station that played against the Broncos. Brown, who was starting a new AAFC team called the Cleveland Browns, sent a friend named Jackie Ranen to sign Speedie for $7,000 in 1946.

With the Browns, Speedie quickly became an important part of an offensive attack that featured quarterback Otto Graham, fullback Marion Motley and fellow receiver Dante Lavelli. He was enthusiastic, energetic and fast, posing a challenge for defenders assigned to cover him. He had an unusual running style because of his bout with Perthes Disease, which Lavelli said "gave him an odd gait in which he could fake plays without even trying". Speedie caught the first touchdown in the AAFC's existence in the Browns' opening game against the Miami Seahawks, a 44–0 win. The Browns ended the regular season with a 12–2 record, winning the AAFC West division and earning a spot in the league championship. During the week before the championship game against the New York Yankees, Speedie and two teammates, Lou Rymkus and team captain Jim Daniell were arrested after an argument with Cleveland police. Daniell was driving a car with Rymkus and Speedie as passengers as they waited for Speedie's wife to return on a flight from Utah. A police car was blocking Daniell's way, and he honked the horn, leading to the confrontation and arrests. Brown kicked Daniell off of the team, but Speedie and Rymkus were not punished by the team; they were, however, held in custody for several hours and charged with creating a disturbance.

The Browns went on to win the championship game in 1946, helped by Speedie's six catches for 71 yards. Speedie led the league in yards per catch, with 23.5, and scored seven touchdowns. After the season, he was named along with several teammates to the AAFC's all-league team.

The 1947 season was another strong one for Speedie. In a game against the Buffalo Bills, he tied a professional football record by catching a throw from Graham and running 99 yards for a touchdown. He finished the season as the league leader in receptions and receiving yards as the Browns won another championship. His 67 catches and 1,146 receiving yards, in fact, were the second-best in pro football history after Don Hutson of the Green Bay Packers, who caught for 1,211 yards in 1940. Speedie was named by news outlets as a first-team All-Pro. Speedie's success in 1947 came as he, Graham and Lavelli gelled as a passing and receiving unit, having studied hours of tape and worked on their technique and coordination. Speedie studied how defensive backs moved their feet and tried to break into the open by exploiting mis-steps. They experimented with screen passes and made modifications to common receiving routes to exploit the weaknesses of defenses.

The Browns had a perfect season the following year, winning the championship for a third straight time. Speedie led the league in receiving and was named an All-Pro again. The 1949 season brought another championship and another All-Pro season for Speedie, who led the league in receptions for the third year in a row. He had 228 receiving yards in a game against the Yankees, which remains a Browns record. Tom Landry, a Yankees cornerback who went on to coach the Dallas Cowboys, was assigned to cover Speedie and called it "the most embarrassing athletic performance of my entire life". The AAFC dissolved after the 1949 season and the Browns, along with two other teams, were absorbed by the more established NFL. Speedie was the AAFC's all-time leader in receptions and receiving yards, with 3,554.

Cleveland's success continued in the NFL in 1950, silencing skeptics who thought the team stood out only because of the poor quality of competition in the AAFC. After beating the two-time defending NFL champion Philadelphia Eagles in the first game of the season, the Browns advanced to the championship game, where they beat the Los Angeles Rams 30–28 on a last-second Lou Groza field goal. Speedie had 548 receiving yards during the season and was selected for the NFL's first-ever Pro Bowl.

The Browns reached the NFL championship game in 1951 and 1952, but lost both times. Speedie led the NFL in receiving in 1951 and was named a first-team All Pro, but he did not play in the championship game due to an injury. He was selected for the Pro Bowl for a second time in 1952. After that season, however, he left the Browns to join the Saskatchewan Roughriders of the Western Interprovincial Football Union (WIFU) under acrimonious circumstances. Speedie had an independent streak that did not sit well with Brown, whose domineering coaching style grated against many of the men who played for him. "He was one of the ones that Paul Brown picked on quite a bit", recalled former teammate Ken Carpenter. "He'd get on Speedie's case for no particular reason." Speedie showed his displeasure by bringing a skunk to training camp in 1952 and calling it "Paul". Brown told Speedie he did not think it was very funny, to which Speedie responded that it was a nocturnal animal and was named after Paul Revere.

The Roughriders offered Speedie double his Browns salary as the Canadian leagues tried to make names for themselves by signing top-level NFL players. Paul Brown refused to match the offer, and Speedie, who was making $11,000 per year with the Browns, joined the Canadian team for the 1953 season. Brown then threatened to sue Speedie for violating his existing contract with the team, saying the Browns had exercised an option to extend the deal after it expired in the summer of 1953. "This was a case of jumping a contract, pure and simple, as this young man morally and ethically had a contract with us", Brown said at the time. Speedie later said that Brown "told me when I jumped leagues that he was going to get even with me".

=== Western Interprovincial Football Union ===
Speedie, by then 33 years old, joined the Roughriders despite the threat of legal action. He had a league-leading seven touchdowns in 1953, and 576 receiving yards the following season. He was named a WIFU All-Star in both of his seasons with the Roughriders. Speedie was sent to the WIFU's BC Lions in 1955, but played only one game for the club. Speedie hurt his left knee and was declared out for the season. He had suffered a hairline leg fracture and underwent surgery on torn ligaments in his knee and ankle. He was expected to scout for the Lions as he recovered. After the injury, Speedie was cut from the Lions' roster and did not play professional football again.

At the end of his career, Speedie was one of the most prolific receivers of his era. He averaged more than 800 receiving yards a season during his seven years in the AAFC and NFL, a mark that was not surpassed for 20 years after he left the game. His career average of 49.9 receptions per season stood for 25 years. He was named to the National Football League 1940s All-Decade Team and was selected by news outlets as a first-team All-Pro six times. The authors of the official NFL encyclopedia named him one of the league's 300 greatest-ever players.

== Coaching career ==
Speedie resurfaced in 1960, when he was named the end coach for the new American Football League's Houston Oilers under former teammate and Oilers head coach Lou Rymkus. The Oilers won the AFL championship in 1960, but Rymkus was fired after the team got off to a slow start the following year. Team owner Bud Adams urged Speedie to stay on the staff, but Speedie resigned out of loyalty to Rymkus.

The AFL's Denver Broncos hired Speedie the following year as an end coach. He served under head coach Jack Faulkner, who replaced Frank Filchock that season and was voted AFL Coach of the Year for turning the team around and posting a 7–7 record. Faulkner led the team to a 2–11–1 season in 1963, however, and Speedie replaced him the following year as the Broncos went on a 14-game losing streak.

In Speedie's first game leading the team, the Broncos ended the losing streak with a 33–27 upset victory over the Kansas City Chiefs. Two weeks later, Speedie suspended placekicker Gene Mingo and defensive back Willie West for "conduct detrimental to the club", reportedly as a result of a late-night party at a hotel. The team posted a 2–7–1 record under Speedie, and he was signed to a two-year contract after the season.

In his first full season as the Broncos' coach in 1965, Speedie's team posted a 4–10 record. After two losses to begin the 1966 season, Speedie resigned and assistant Ray Malavasi took over. He said the move was in the best interest of the club. Speedie had a 6–19–1 record as the Broncos' coach. He then accepted a scouting position with the organization and was based out of his home in Laguna Hills, California. He held the post until his retirement in 1982.

== Later life and death ==
Speedie had a brief and cold reunion with Brown in 1977, when the two met at the annual East–West Shrine Game, a college all-star game. Speedie introduced himself to Brown, only to be told, "Yes, I know. You're the one who went to Canada." Speedie's friends and former teammates lobbied repeatedly for his inclusion in the Pro Football Hall of Fame, but Speedie believed that his conflict with Brown was keeping him out even as numerous former teammates, including Otto Graham, Dante Lavelli and Marion Motley were inducted. He was placed on an old-timers' list of nominees for induction into the hall in the mid-1980s, but ultimately was passed over. "Quite honestly, I think Paul Brown is the reason" for Speedie's exclusion, Graham said in 1991. "Paul wasn't the type of guy you crossed. He would never forget it."

While he was passed over for professional football's hall of fame during his lifetime, Speedie was inducted into the Utah Sports Hall of Fame in 1972 and the University of Utah's Crimson Club hall of fame in 1986. He died in California in 1993.

On January 15, 2020, Speedie was elected to the Pro Football Hall of Fame Class of 2020.

== NFL career statistics ==
Legend
	Won the NFL championship or AAFC Championship
	Led the league
**Bold**	Career high

Year	Team	Games		Receiving				
Year	Team	GP	GS	Rec	Yds	Avg	Lng	TD
1946	CLE	**14**	10	24	564	**23.5**	79	**7**
1947	CLE	**14**	9	**67**	**1,146**	17.1	**99**	6
1948	CLE	12	11	58	816	14.1	56	4
1949	CLE	12	11	62	1,028	16.6	–	**7**
1950	CLE	12	**12**	42	548	13.0	45	1
1951	CLE	10	9	34	589	17.3	51	3
1952	CLE	12	**12**	62	911	14.7	50	5
Career		86	74	349	5,602	16.1	99	33
