= 1947 All-Pro Team =

Official list of the best NFL players in 1947

The 1947 All-Pro Team consisted of American football players who were chosen by various selectors for the All-Pro team for the 1947 football season. Teams were selected by, among others, the Associated Press (AP), the United Press (UP), Pro Football Illustrated, and the New York Daily News (NYDN). The AP selections included players from the National Football League (NFL) and All-America Football Conference; the UP, PFI, and NYDN selections were limited to players from the NFL.

== Selections ==
Position	Player	Team	Selector(s)
Quarterback	Sid Luckman	Chicago Bears	AP-1, UP-1, PFI-1, NYDN-1
Quarterback	Otto Graham	Cleveland Browns	AP-1
Quarterback	Sammy Baugh	Washington Redskins	AP-2
Halfback	Steve Van Buren	Philadelphia Eagles	AP-1, UP-1, PFI-1, NYDN-1
Halfback	Bill Dudley	Detroit Lions	PFI-1, NYDN-1
Back	Spec Sanders	New York Yankees	AP-1
Fullback	Pat Harder	Chicago Cardinals	UP-1, PFI-1, NYDN-1
End	Mac Speedie	Cleveland Browns	AP-1
End	Bruce Alford	New York Yankees	AP-1
End	Ken Kavanaugh	Chicago Bears	UP-1, NYDN-1
End	Malcolm Kutner	Chicago Cardinals	UP-1, PFI-1
End	Val Jansante	Pittsburgh Steelers	NYDN-1
End	Larry Craig	Green Bay Packers	PFI-1
Tackle	Al Wistert	Philadelphia Eagles	AP-1, UP-1, NYDN-1
Tackle	Fred Davis	Chicago Bears	UP-1, PFI-1, NYDN-1
Tackle	Dick Huffman	Los Angeles Rams	AP-1
Tackle	Stan Mauldin	Chicago Cardinals	PFI-1
Guard	Riley Matheson	Los Angeles Rams	AP-1, NYDN-1
Guard	Bruno Banducci	San Francisco 49ers	AP-1
Guard	Dick Wildung	Green Bay Packers	UP-1, NYDN-1
Guard	Red Moore	Pittsburgh Steelers	UP-1
Guard	Buster Ramsey	Chicago Cardinals	PFI-1, NYDN-1
Center	Bulldog Turner	Chicago Bears	AP-1, PFI-1, NYDN-1
Center	Vince Banonis	Chicago Cardinals	UP-1
