= List of Washington State Cougars in the NFL draft =

This is a list of Washington State Cougars selected in the NFL draft.

== Key ==
B	Back	K	Kicker	NT	Nose tackle
C	Center	LB	Linebacker	FB	Fullback
DB	Defensive back	P	Punter	HB	Halfback
DE	Defensive end	QB	Quarterback	WR	Wide receiver
DT	Defensive tackle	RB	Running back	G	Guard
E	End	T	Offensive tackle	TE	Tight end

== Selections ==
Year	Round	Pick	Player	Team	Position
1936	4	33	Ed Brett	Chicago Cardinals	E
1936	6	50	Ted Christofferson	Chicago Bears	B
1937	1	2	Ed Goddard	Brooklyn Dodgers	B
1937	9	84	Dwight Scheyer	New York Giants	T
1937	10	97	Kay Bell	Detroit Lions	T
1938	10	88	Bob Grimstead	New York Giants	T
1938	11	91	Al Hoptowit	Cleveland Rams	T
1939	16	148	Dick Farman	Washington Redskins	T
1939	22	198	Al Cruver	Washington Redskins	B
1941	20	187	Earl Stone	New York Giants	C
1942	7	53	Billy Sewell	Philadelphia Eagles	B
1943	4	27	Bob Kennedy	Philadelphia Eagles	B
1943	6	48	Nick Susoeff	Green Bay Packers	E
1943	11	91	Dick Renfro	Detroit Lions	B
1943	14	126	Jay Stoves	New York Giants	B
1943	24	221	Will Remington	Detroit Lions	C
1943	30	290	Frank Akins	Washington Redskins	B
1944	6	53	Al Akins	Cleveland Rams	B
1944	8	68	Rod Giske	Detroit Lions	G
1944	29	303	Bill Gustafson	Washington Redskins	T
1944	31	320	Buster Hollingbery	Washington Redskins	C
1945	22	229	Vern Oliver	New York Giants	C
1945	28	296	Jim Thompson	Green Bay Packers	B
1946	24	230	Bill Lippincott	Los Angeles Rams	B
1947	20	177	Darrell Waller	Boston Yanks	B
1947	21	188	Elmo Bond	Washington Redskins	T
1947	26	239	Francis Bocoka	Washington Redskins	E
1947	27	252	Dick Abrams	Chicago Cardinals	B
1949	2	18	Laurie Niemi	Washington Redskins	T
1949	7	63	Jerry Williams	Los Angeles Rams	B
1950	3	35	Fran Polsfoot	Chicago Cardinals	E
1950	4	47	Don Paul	Chicago Cardinals	B
1950	7	84	Jerry Houghton	Washington Redskins	T
1950	21	274	Marv Cross	Philadelphia Eagles	B
1950	24	307	Bob Gambold	Chicago Cardinals	B
1951	5	58	LaVern Torgeson	Detroit Lions	C
1951	19	225	Gordy Hanson	Detroit Lions	T
1952	10	116	Bud Roffler	Green Bay Packers	B
1952	25	298	By Bailey	Detroit Lions	B
1953	1	12	Ed Barker	Los Angeles Rams	E
1953	6	71	Don Steinbrunner	Cleveland Browns	E
1953	11	129	Al Charlton	San Francisco 49ers	B
1953	11	133	Elmer Messenger	Detroit Lions	G
1953	17	204	Harland Svare	Los Angeles Rams	E
1953	22	255	Hal Lokovsek	Chicago Cardinals	T
1954	4	49	Howard McCants	Detroit Lions	E
1954	7	76	Wayne Berry	New York Giants	B
1954	11	133	Milt Schwenk	Detroit Lions	T
1954	30	351	Terry Campbell	Green Bay Packers	B
1955	10	118	Duke Washington	Philadelphia Eagles	B
1955	23	274	Tom Gunnari	San Francisco 49ers	E
1955	27	317	Bob Peringer	Green Bay Packers	E
1955	27	319	Bruce Nevitt	Los Angeles Rams	C
1956	16	192	Arnie Pelluer	Los Angeles Rams	E
1956	23	276	Al Paulson	Los Angeles Rams	B
1957	30	360	Don Gest	New York Giants	E
1958	2	22	Bob Newman	San Francisco 49ers	B
1958	22	259	Bill Steiger	Los Angeles Rams	E
1958	23	276	Dan Verhey	Cleveland Browns	T
1958	28	326	Dave Crowell	Green Bay Packers	G
1959	30	359	Carl Ketchie	Cleveland Browns	B
1960	6	63	Gail Cogdill	Detroit Lions	WR
1960	6	66	Don Ellersick	Los Angeles Rams	E
1961	5	61	Keith Lincoln	Chicago Bears	B
1962	9	126	Peter Schenck	Green Bay Packers	B
1962	17	236	Mike Martin	Philadelphia Eagles	T
1962	20	275	Herm McKee	Baltimore Colts	B
1963	4	50	Hugh Campbell	San Francisco 49ers	E
1963	6	81	Dave Mathieson	Chicago Bears	QB
1964	12	162	Kenny Graham	Baltimore Colts	DB
1964	13	178	Glenn Baker	Pittsburgh Steelers	T
1965	1	9	Clancy Williams	Los Angeles Rams	RB
1965	19	254	Dale Ford	San Francisco 49ers	RB
1967	2	37	Rich Sheron	New York Jets	TE
1967	6	138	Bud Norris	Miami Dolphins	TE
1967	11	271	Bob Trygstad	Minnesota Vikings	DT
1968	5	112	Dave Middendorf	Cincinnati Bengals	G
1969	7	172	Steve Van Sinderen	San Francisco 49ers	T
1970	15	374	Jim Vest	New Orleans Saints	DE
1970	15	388	Fred Moore	Oakland Raiders	WR
1970	17	422	Richard Smith	Cincinnati Bengals	RB
1972	4	81	Bernard Jackson	Cincinnati Bengals	DB
1972	14	351	John van Reenen	San Diego Chargers	DE
1973	9	225	Ty Paine	New York Giants	QB
1974	6	152	Robin Sinclair	Cincinnati Bengals	DB
1974	8	190	Ken Grandberry	Chicago Bears	RB
1974	9	212	Tom Wickert	Miami Dolphins	G
1975	3	60	Andrew Jones	New Orleans Saints	RB
1975	3	61	Geoff Reece	Los Angeles Rams	C
1975	10	257	Joe Danelo	Miami Dolphins	K
1976	10	275	Robin Ross	San Francisco 49ers	T
1976	13	370	Mark Young	Oakland Raiders	T
1976	14	383	Mark Husfloen	Atlanta Falcons	DE
1976	15	405	Dan Smith	Seattle Seahawks	T
1978	1	19	Ken Greene	St. Louis Cardinals	DB
1978	4	87	Don Schwartz	New Orleans Saints	DB
1978	6	164	Mike Levenseller	Oakland Raiders	WR
1978	7	174	Dan Doornink	New York Giants	RB
1978	8	219	Don Hover	Washington Redskins	LB
1978	8	220	Gavin Hendrick	San Diego Chargers	P
1978	12	312	Eason Ramson	Green Bay Packers	TE
1978	12	318	Mark Patterson	Detroit Lions	DB
1979	1	3	Jack Thompson	Cincinnati Bengals	QB
1980	4	108	Bob Gregor	San Diego Chargers	DB
1980	11	292	Tali Ena	Seattle Seahawks	RB
1980	12	307	Ray Williams	Detroit Lions	WR
1980	12	309	Tyrone Gray	St. Louis Cardinals	WR
1981	4	91	Scott Pelluer	Dallas Cowboys	LB
1981	9	230	Samoa Samoa	Cincinnati Bengals	RB
1981	9	236	Jim Whatley	Seattle Seahawks	WR
1981	9	246	Mike Wilson	Dallas Cowboys	WR
1981	10	267	Allan Kennedy	Washington Redskins	T
1982	5	138	Paul Sorensen	Cincinnati Bengals	DB
1982	6	140	Pat Beach	Baltimore Colts	TE
1982	8	197	Ken Collins	New England Patriots	LB
1982	11	288	Jeff Keller	Atlanta Falcons	WR
1983	11	285	Steve Sebahar	Philadelphia Eagles	C
1983	12	311	Clete Casper	Los Angeles Rams	QB
1984	1	13	Keith Millard	Minnesota Vikings	DE
1984	3	62	Eric Williams	Detroit Lions	DT
1984	11	292	Charlie Flager	New England Patriots	G
1985	8	224	Milford Hodge	New England Patriots	DT
1985	12	334	Dan Lynch	Denver Broncos	G
1986	2	46	Erik Howard	New York Giants	DT
1986	3	57	Rueben Mayes	New Orleans Saints	RB
1986	6	146	Mark Rypien	Washington Redskins	QB
1986	10	261	Junior Tautalatasi	Philadelphia Eagles	RB
1987	2	36	Ricky Reynolds	Tampa Bay Buccaneers	DB
1987	5	128	Kitrick Taylor	Kansas City Chiefs	WR
1987	7	171	Kerry Porter	Buffalo Bills	RB
1987	8	202	Michael James	Houston Oilers	WR
1988	3	74	James Hasty	New York Jets	DB
1988	7	190	Brian Forde	New Orleans Saints	LB
1988	8	201	Darryl Franklin	Los Angeles Rams	WR
1988	11	304	Richard Calvin	Denver Broncos	RB
1989	3	59	Mike Utley	Detroit Lions	G
1989	8	221	Chris Dyko	Chicago Bears	T
1989	11	293	Artie Holmes	New York Jets	DB
1989s	1	2	Timm Rosenbach	Phoenix Cardinals	QB
1990	1	20	Steve Broussard	Atlanta Falcons	RB
1990	5	112	Tony Savage	New York Jets	DT
1990	6	161	Tim Stallworth	Los Angeles Rams	WR
1990	7	182	Dan Grayson	Pittsburgh Steelers	LB
1990	8	204	Doug Wellsandt	Cincinnati Bengals	TE
1990	11	302	Tim Downing	New York Giants	DE
1992	2	56	Jason Hanson	Detroit Lions	K
1992	5	126	Michael Wright	New York Giants	DB
1992	9	238	Anthony Prior	New York Giants	DB
1992	11	289	Augustin Olobia	Cleveland Browns	WR
1993	1	1	Drew Bledsoe	New England Patriots	QB
1993	4	99	Lewis Bush	San Diego Chargers	LB
1993	7	169	Clarence Williams	Denver Broncos	TE
1995	1	13	Mark Fields	New Orleans Saints	LB
1995	3	93	Don Sasa	San Diego Chargers	DT
1995	3	95	Torey Hunter	Houston Oilers	DB
1995	7	241	Chad Eaton	Arizona Cardinals	DT
1996	7	210	Chris Hayes	New York Jets	DB
1997	2	57	James Darling	Philadelphia Eagles	LB
1997	3	81	Scott Sanderson	Houston Oilers	T
1997	5	139	Chad Carpenter	Arizona Cardinals	WR
1998	1	2	Ryan Leaf	San Diego Chargers	QB
1998	2	31	Leon Bender	Oakland Raiders	DT
1998	2	56	Dorian Boose	New York Jets	DT
1998	7	197	Jason McEndoo	Seattle Seahawks	T
1999	7	242	Dee Moronkola	Jacksonville Jaguars	DB
2000	7	241	Rob Meier	Jacksonville Jaguars	DT
2001	4	116	Milton Wynn	St. Louis Rams	WR
2002	2	38	Raonall Smith	Minnesota Vikings	LB
2002	2	41	Lamont Thompson	Cincinnati Bengals	DB
2003	1	11	Marcus Trufant	Seattle Seahawks	DB
2003	4	126	Rien Long	Tennessee Titans	DT
2004	3	82	Devard Darling	Baltimore Ravens	WR
2004	4	125	Jason David	Indianapolis Colts	DB
2004	5	143	Erik Coleman	New York Jets	DB
2005	3	76	Karl Paymah	Denver Broncos	DB
2005	6	211	Calvin Armstrong	Philadelphia Eagles	T
2005	7	231	Hamza Abdullah	Tampa Bay Buccaneers	DB
2006	5	145	Jerome Harrison	Cleveland Browns	RB
2007	3	76	Jason Hill	San Francisco 49ers	WR
2007	5	165	Eric Frampton	Oakland Raiders	DB
2008	7	223	Alex Brink	Houston Texans	QB
2009	6	194	Brandon Gibson	Philadelphia Eagles	WR
2011	6	203	Zack Williams	Carolina Panthers	C
2013	7	236	Marquess Wilson	Chicago Bears	WR
2014	1	27	Deone Bucannon	Arizona Cardinals	DB
2015	3	96	Xavier Cooper	Cleveland Browns	DT
2015	4	123	Vince Mayle	Cleveland Browns	WR
2016	5	151	Joe Dahl	Detroit Lions	G
2017	7	221	Shalom Luani	Oakland Raiders	DB
2018	5	138	Cole Madison	Green Bay Packers	G
2018	6	199	Luke Falk	Tennessee Titans	QB
2019	1	22	Andre Dillard	Philadelphia Eagles	T
2019	6	178	Gardner Minshew	Jacksonville Jaguars	QB
2020	6	212	Dezmon Patmon	Indianapolis Colts	WR
2022	3	72	Abraham Lucas	Seattle Seahawks	T
2022	7	243	Jaylen Watson	Kansas City Chiefs	DB
2023	3	85	Daiyan Henley	Los Angeles Chargers	LB
2024	4	133	Jaden Hicks	Kansas City Chiefs	DB
2024	5	154	Brennan Jackson	Los Angeles Rams	DE
2024	5	157	Chau Smith-Wade	Carolina Panthers	DB
2025	3	69	Kyle Williams	New England Patriots	WR

== See also ==
- List of Washington State University people
