= 1953 Pittsburgh Steelers season =

NFL team season

- Head coach: Joe Bach
- Home stadium: Forbes Field

Results
- Record: 6–6
- Division place: 4th NFL Eastern
- Playoffs: Did not qualify

The 1953 Pittsburgh Steelers season marked the franchise's 21st year in the National Football League (NFL). The club finished with a record of 6 wins and 6 losses, 4th place in the league's Eastern Conference.

== Regular season ==
=== Schedule ===
Game	Date	Opponent	Result	Record	Venue	Attendance	Recap	Sources
1	September 27	at Detroit Lions	L 21–38	0–1				
2	October 3	New York Giants	W 24–14	1–1				
3	October 11	Chicago Cardinals	W 31–28	2–1				
4	October 17	at Philadelphia Eagles	L 7–23	2–2				
5	October 24	Green Bay Packers	W 31–14	3–2				
6	November 1	Philadelphia Eagles	L 7–35	3–3				
7	November 8	at Cleveland Browns	L 16–34	3–4				
8	November 15	at New York Giants	W 14–10	4–4				
9	November 22	Cleveland Browns	L 16–20	4–5				
10	November 29	Washington Redskins	L 9–17	4–6				
11	December 6	at Chicago Cardinals	W 21–17	5–6				
12	December 13	at Washington Redskins	W 14–13	6–6				

=== Game summaries ===
==== Week 1 (Sunday September 27, 1953): Detroit Lions ====
	1	2	3	4	Total
Steelers	7	7	0	7	21
Lions	7	17	7	7	38

at Briggs Stadium, Detroit, Michigan

- Game time:
- Game weather:
- Game attendance: 20,675
- Referee:
- TV announcers:

Scoring drives:

- Detroit – Carpenter 73 interception (Walker kick)
- Pittsburgh – Nickel 14 pass from Finks (Bolkovac kick)
- Detroit – Gedman 1 run (Walker kick)
- Detroit – FG Walker 40
- Pittsburgh – Mathews 1 fumble run (Bolkovac kick)
- Detroit – Hart 49 pass from Layne (Walker kick)
- Detroit – Walker 8 pass from Hoernschmeyer (Walker kick)
- Detroit – Hoernschemeyer 29 pass from Layne (Walker kick)
- Pittsburgh – Nickel 15 pass from Marchibroda (Bolkovac kick)

==== Week 2 (Saturday October 3, 1953): New York Giants ====
	1	2	3	4	Total
Giants	7	7	0	0	14
Steelers	7	3	0	14	24

at Forbes Field, Pittsburgh, Pennsylvania

- Game time:
- Game weather:
- Game attendance: 31,500
- Referee:
- TV announcers:

Scoring drives:

- New York Giants – Clay 2 pass from Conerly (Clay kick)
- Pittsburgh – Chandnois 93 kick return (Bolkovac kick)
- New York Giants – Long 55 pass from Conerly (Clay kick)
- Pittsburgh – FG Bolkovac 35
- Pittsburgh – Nickel 4 pass from Finks (Bolkovac kick)
- Pittsburgh – Bolkovac 14 fumble run (Bolkovac kick)

==== Week 3 (Sunday October 11, 1953): Chicago Cardinals ====
	1	2	3	4	Total
Cardinals	7	14	7	0	28
Steelers	0	7	7	17	31

at Forbes Field, Pittsburgh, Pennsylvania

- Game time:
- Game weather:
- Game attendance: 25,953
- Referee:
- TV announcers:

Scoring drives:

- Chicago Cardinals – Olszewski 1 run (Summerall kick)
- Pittsburgh – Rogel 1 run (Bolkovac kick)
- Chicago Cardinals – Nagler 34 pass from Root (Summerall kick)
- Chicago Cardinals – Nagler 6 pass from Root (Summerall kick)
- Chicago Cardinals – Stonesifer 3 pass from Trippi (Summerall kick)
- Pittsburgh – Mathews 19 pass from Finks (Bolkovac kick)
- Pittsburgh – Rogel 4 run (Bolkovac kick)
- Pittsburgh – Barker 4 pass from Finks (Bolkovac kick)
- Pittsburgh – FG Bolkovac 28

==== Week 4 (Saturday October 17, 1953): Philadelphia Eagles ====
	1	2	3	4	Total
Steelers	0	0	7	0	7
Eagles	0	0	6	17	23

at Connie Mack Stadium, Philadelphia, Pennsylvania

- Game time:
- Game weather:
- Game attendance: 18,681
- Referee:
- TV announcers:

Scoring drives:

- Philadelphia – Pihos 28 pass from Burk (kick blocked)
- Pittsburgh – Mathews 23 pass from Finks (Bolkovac kick)
- Philadelphia – FG Walston 11
- Philadelphia – Giancanelli 16 pass from Thomason (Walston kick)
- Philadelphia – Ziegler 1 run (Walston kick)

==== Week 5 (Saturday October 24, 1953): Green Bay Packers ====
	1	2	3	4	Total
Packers	0	0	7	7	14
Steelers	7	10	14	0	31

at Forbes Field, Pittsburgh, Pennsylvania

- Game time:
- Game weather:
- Game attendance: 22,918
- Referee:
- TV announcers:

Scoring Drives:

- Pittsburgh – Finks 4 run (Bolkovac kick)
- Pittsburgh – FG Bolkovac 40
- Pittsburgh – Chandnois 6 run (Bolkovac kick)
- Pittsburgh – Brandt 2 run (Bolkovac kick)
- PIttsburgh – Brandt 1 run (Bolkovac kick)
- Green Bay – Parilli 1 run (Cone kick)
- Green Bay – Cone 5 pass from Rote (Cone kick)

==== Week 6 (Sunday November 1, 1953): Philadelphia Eagles ====
	1	2	3	4	Total
Eagles	14	7	0	14	35
Steelers	0	7	0	0	7

at Forbes Field, Pittsburgh, Pennsylvania

- Game time:
- Game weather:
- Game attendance: 27,547
- Referee:
- TV announcers:

Scoring Drives:

- Philadelphia – Gianganelli 7 run (Walston kick)
- Philadelphia – Williams 48 run (Walston kick)
- Philadelphia – Walston 21 pass from Thomason (Walston kick)
- Pittsburgh – Mathews 11 pass from Finks (Bolkovac kick)
- Philadelphia – Pihos 26 pass from Thomason (Walston kick)
- Philadelphia – Giancanelli 8 pass from Thomason (Walston kick)

==== Week 7 (Sunday November 8, 1953): Cleveland Browns ====
	1	2	3	4	Total
Steelers	9	7	0	0	16
Browns	0	24	0	10	34

at Cleveland Municipal Stadium, Cleveland, Ohio

- Game time:
- Game weather:
- Game attendance: 35,592
- Referee:
- TV announcers:

Scoring Drives:

- Pittsburgh – FG Bolkovac 27
- Pittsburgh – Mathews 2 run (kick failed)
- Cleveland – Carpenter 7 run (Groza kick)
- Cleveland – FG Groza 20
- Cleveland – Renfro 44 run (Groza kick)
- Pittsburgh – Mathews 77 pass from Finks (Bolkovac kick)
- Cleveland – Renfro 79 blocked field goal return (Groza kick)
- Cleveland – Lavelli 17 pass from Graham (Groza kick)
- Cleveland – FG Groza 14

==== Week 8 (Sunday November 15, 1953): New York Giants ====
	1	2	3	4	Total
Steelers	7	0	0	7	14
Giants	0	0	7	3	10

at Polo Grounds, New York, New York

- Game time:
- Game weather:
- Game attendance: 20,411
- Referee:
- TV announcers:

Scoring Drives:

- Pittsburgh – Dodrill 16 fumble run (Bolkovac kick)
- New York Giants – Gifford 6 pass from Conerly (Gifford kick)
- New York Giants – FG Clay 20
- Pittsburgh – Butler 33 pass from Finks (Bolkovac kick)

==== Week 9 (Sunday November 22, 1953): Cleveland Browns ====
	1	2	3	4	Total
Browns	7	10	3	0	20
Steelers	9	0	0	7	16

at Forbes Field, Pittsburgh, Pennsylvania

- Game time:
- Game weather:
- Game attendance: 32,904
- Referee:
- TV announcers:

Scoring Drives:

- Cleveland – Renfro 54 pass from Graham (Groza kick)
- Pittsburgh – Finks 1 run (Bolkovac kick)
- Pittsburgh – Safety, Lahr tackled in end zone by Mathews
- Cleveland – FG Groza 50
- Cleveland – Brewster 31 pass from Graham (Groza kick)
- Cleveland – FG Groza 41
- Pittsburgh – Mathews 1 run (Bolkovac kick)

==== Week 10 (Sunday November 29, 1953): Washington Redskins ====
	1	2	3	4	Total
Redskins	0	7	0	10	17
Steelers	2	0	0	7	9

at Forbes Field, Pittsburgh, Pennsylvania

- Game time:
- Game weather:
- Game attendance: 17,206
- Referee:
- TV announcers:

Scoring Drives:

- Pittsburgh – Safety, Heath tackled by Ferry in end zone
- Washington – Taylor 5 pass from LeBaron (Dudley kick)
- Pittsburgh – Chandnois 5 run (Bolkovac kick)
- Washington – FG Dudley 41
- Washington – Rykovich 5 pass from LeBaron (Dudley kick)

==== Week 11 (Sunday December 6, 1953): Chicago Cardinals ====
	1	2	3	4	Total
Steelers	0	0	7	14	21
Cardinals	7	0	3	7	17

at Comiskey Park, Chicago, Illinois

- Game time:
- Game weather:
- Game attendance: 14,138
- Referee:
- TV announcers:

Scoring Drives:

- Chicago Cardinals – Olszewski 1 run (Summerall kick)
- Chicago Cardinals – FG Summerall 12
- Pittsburgh – Brandt 1 run (Bolkovac kick)
- Pittsburgh – Nickel 6 pass from Mackrides (Bolkovac kick)
- Pittsburgh – Mackrides 2 run (Bolkovac kick)
- Chicago Cardinals – Paul 5 pass from Romanik (Summerall kick)

==== Week 12 (Sunday December 13, 1953): Washington Redskins ====
	1	2	3	4	Total
Steelers	0	0	0	14	14
Redskins	7	3	3	0	13

at Griffith Stadium, Washington, DC

- Game time:
- Game weather:
- Game attendance: 22,057
- Referee:
- TV announcers:

Scoring Drives:

- Washington – Dekker 34 pass from LeBaron
- Washington – FG Dudley 39
- Washington – FG Dudley 20
- Pittsburgh – Chandnois 23 lateral from Mathews (Bolkovac kick)
- Pittsburgh – Butler 5 interception (Bolkovac kick)

=== Standings ===
NFL Eastern Conference
	W	L	T	PCT	CONF	PF	PA	STK
Cleveland Browns	11	1	0	.917	9–1	348	162	L1
Philadelphia Eagles	7	4	1	.636	6–3–1	352	215	W1
Washington Redskins	6	5	1	.545	6–3–1	208	215	L1
Pittsburgh Steelers	6	6	0	.500	5–5	211	263	W2
New York Giants	3	9	0	.250	3–7	179	277	L2
Chicago Cardinals	1	10	1	.091	0–10	190	337	W1

Note: Tie games were not officially counted in the standings until 1972.

== Roster ==
1953 Pittsburgh Steelers roster
Quarterbacks (QB): 7 Jim Finks; 13 Bill Mackrides; Running backs (RB): 27 Jim Brandt S; 49 Lynn Chandnois; 39 Leo Elter; 25 Ray Mathews S; 33 Fran Rogel; Wide receivers (WR): 89 Ed Barker S; 81 Elbie Nickel; 88 George Sulima; Tight ends (TE)	Offensive linemen (OL): 72 Bob Gaona T; 65 George Hughes T; 64 Marv McFadden G; 66 John Schweder G/MG; 61 Lou Tepe C; 56 Bill Walsh C; Defensive linemen (DL): 83 John Alderton DE; 60 Dale Dodrill MG; 78 Lou Ferry DT; 84 Bill McPeak DE; 77 Tom Palmer DT; 70 Ernie Stautner DT; 82 George Tarasovic DE	Linebackers (LB): 57 Dick Flanagan OLB; 63 Darrell Hogan MLB; 62 Marv Matuszak OLB; Defensive backs (DB): 80 Jack Butler CB/WR; 35 Tom Calvin S/RB; 26 Art DeCarlo CB; 24 Claude Hipps S; Special teams (ST): 89 Nick Bolkovac K/DT; 18 Pat Brady P	Reserve: -- Rudy Andabaker G (Military); -- Ed Kissell S/K (Military); -- Pete Ladygo G (IR); 14 Ted Marchibroda QB (Military); -- Ed Modzelewski RB (Military); Rookies in italics
