= 1953 Cleveland Browns season =

NFL team season

- Head coach: Paul Brown
- Home stadium: Cleveland Stadium

Results
- Record: 11–1
- Division place: 1st Eastern
- Playoffs: Lost NFL Championship (at Lions) 16–17
- All-Pros: 8: DE Len Ford (1st team); QB Otto Graham (1st team); E Dante Lavelli (1st team); T Lou Groza (1st team); C Frank Gatski (1st team); G Bill Willis (1st team); LB Tommy Thompson (1st team); CB Warren Lahr (2nd team)
- Pro Bowlers: Ray Renfro, F Tommy James, DB; Chick Jagade, FB; Warren Lahr, CB; Lou Groza, LT; Otto Graham, QB; Len Ford, DE; Abe Gibron, G Dante Lavelli, E

The 1953 Cleveland Browns season was the team's fourth season with the National Football League. Their start of eleven wins before losing their last game was the closest to a true perfect season in the NFL until the 1972 Miami Dolphins. After that fifteen-point loss at Philadelphia, the Browns met the Detroit Lions in the NFL Championship Game for the second straight year; the Lions won again, this time by a point at home.

This was the second of two NFL seasons that coach Paul Brown would win eleven games. It would be seventy years before another (Kevin Stefanski) would win eleven games in two seasons coaching the Browns, by which time the NFL regular season schedule had expanded from twelve to seventeen games.

== Preseason ==
Week	Date	Opponent	Result	Record	Venue	Attendance
1	August 23	at San Francisco 49ers	W 20–7	1–0	Kezar Stadium	36,273
2	August 28	at Los Angeles Rams	L 9–27	1–1	L.A. Memorial Coliseum	21,440
3	September 4	at Detroit Lions	T 24–24	1–1–1	Briggs Stadium	39,985
4	September 7	vs. Baltimore Colts	W 23–21	2–1–1	Rubber Bowl	20,000
5	September 11	at Chicago Bears	W 20–14	3–1–1	Wrigley Field	36,796
6	September 19	Green Bay Packers	W 21–13	4–1–1	Cleveland Stadium	22,336

== Regular season ==
=== Schedule ===
Week	Date	Opponent	Result	Record	Venue	Attendance	Sources
1	September 27	at Green Bay Packers	**W** 27–0	1–0	County Stadium	22,604	
2	October 4	at **Chicago Cardinals**	**W** 27–7	2–0	Comiskey Park	24,374	
3	October 10	**Philadelphia Eagles**	**W** 37–13	3–0	Cleveland Stadium	45,802	
4	October 18	at **Washington Redskins**	**W** 30–14	4–0	Griffith Stadium	33,963	
5	October 25	at **New York Giants**	**W** 7–0	5–0	Polo Grounds	30,773	
6	November 1	**Washington Redskins**	**W** 27–3	6–0	Cleveland Stadium	47,845	
7	November 8	**Pittsburgh Steelers**	**W** 34–16	7–0	Cleveland Stadium	35,592	
8	November 15	San Francisco 49ers	**W** 23–21	8–0	Cleveland Stadium	80,698	
9	November 22	at **Pittsburgh Steelers**	**W** 20–16	9–0	Forbes Field	32,904	
10	November 29	**Chicago Cardinals**	**W** 27–16	10–0	Cleveland Stadium	24,499	
11	December 6	**New York Giants**	**W** 62–14	11–0	Cleveland Stadium	40,235	
12	December 13	at **Philadelphia Eagles**	**L** 27–42	11–1	Connie Mack Stadium	38,654	
Note: Intra-division opponents are in **bold** text.

=== Game summaries ===
==== Week 1 at Milwaukee ====
In the first-ever regular season meeting between Cleveland and Green Bay, the Browns rolled up 376 yards and Otto Graham completed 18 of 24 yards to highlight a 27–0 season opening win in at the new County Stadium in Milwaukee. The Browns yield 159 yards and allow the Packers to penetrate Cleveland territory just four times.

==== Week 5 at New York ====
Graham scores the game's only touchdown on a 4-yard run in the second period as the Browns beat the Giants, 7–0, on a muddy Polo Grounds field. Graham, who attempts only five passes as the inclement conditions, scores after an offsides penalty on Lou Groza's missed field goal attempt gives the Browns a critical first down.

==== Week 6 vs. Washington ====
The undefeated Browns make life miserable for Redskins quarterback Eddie LeBaron by intercepting four passes in a 27–3 win at Cleveland Stadium. Tommy James ties his own Browns record with three as Cleveland scores 24 points off turnovers.

==== Week 8 vs. San Francisco ====
A Cleveland Stadium crowd of 80,698 watches the Browns dispatch longtime rival San Francisco, 23–21. With the Browns leading 10–0, Graham is knocked out of bounds by defensive back Fred Bruney and elbowed in the face by linebacker Art Michalik, who opens a gash that requires 15 stitches and nearly incites a riot. Graham returns for the third quarter wearing a clear plastic protective bar in front of his face, a device that will evolve into today's face mask. Showing little effect from his injury, Graham leads the Browns to 13 second half points and the victory.

==== Week 11 vs. New York ====
The Browns improve to 11–0 by winning a 62–14 laugher over the Giants at Cleveland Stadium. George Ratterman starts in place of Graham and completes 15-of-27 passes for 235 yards and four touchdowns. Graham plays briefly and completes 3-of-4 passes, two for touchdowns. Pete Brewster catches seven passes for 182 yards and three touchdowns in the most productive game of his career.

=== Standings ===
Program for the Week 3 home game against the divisional rival Philadelphia Eagles.

NFL Eastern Conference
	W	L	T	PCT	CONF	PF	PA	STK
Cleveland Browns	11	1	0	.917	9–1	348	162	L1
Philadelphia Eagles	7	4	1	.636	6–3–1	352	215	W1
Washington Redskins	6	5	1	.545	6–3–1	208	215	L1
Pittsburgh Steelers	6	6	0	.500	5–5	211	263	W2
New York Giants	3	9	0	.250	3–7	179	277	L2
Chicago Cardinals	1	10	1	.091	0–10	190	337	W1

Note: Tie games were not officially counted in the standings until 1972.

== NFL Championship Game ==
Round	Date	Opponent	Result	Record	Venue	Attendance	Sources
Championship	December 27	at Detroit Lions	L 16–17	0–1	Briggs Stadium	54,577	

== Roster ==
1953 Cleveland Browns roster
Quarterbacks: 14 Otto Graham; 16 George Ratterman; Running backs: 20 Ken Carpenter; 30 Sherman Howard CB; 32 Chick Jagade; 40 Dub Jones; 36 Marion Motley LB; 26 Ray Renfro; 46 Billy Reynolds; Receivers: 88 Pete Brewster; 84 Horace Gillom P/DE; 86 Dante Lavelli	Offensive linemen: 66 Gene Donaldson G; 52 Frank Gatski C; 64 Abe Gibron G; 76 Lou Groza T/K; 62 Lin Houston G; 65 Chuck Noll G; 78 John Sandusky T; Defensive linemen: 83 Doug Atkins DE; 70 Don Colo DT; 80 Len Ford DT; 79 Jerry Helluin MG; 72 Derrell Palmer DT; 74 Don Steinbrunner MG/DT/T; 60 Bill Willis MG; 82 George Young DE	Linebackers: 65 Tom Catlin; 34 Walt Michaels; Defensive backs: 15 Ken Gorgal S; 42 Tommy James CB; 22 Ken Konz S; 24 Warren Lahr CB	Reserve lists: -- Harold Bradley MG (Military); -- Bob Gain DT (Military); -- Mike McCormack T (Military); -- Joe Skibinski G (Military); 54 Tommy Thompson LB (IR); rookies in italics

== Awards and records ==
- Otto Graham, NFL MVP
