= Elbie Nickel =

American football player (1922–2007)

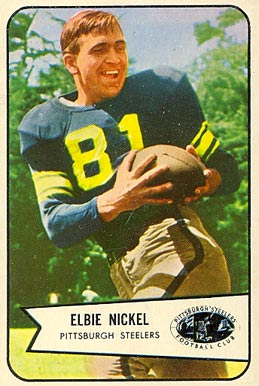

No. 81
- Position: Tight end

Personal information
- Born: December 28, 1922; Fullerton, Kentucky, U.S.
- Died: February 27, 2007 (aged 84); Chillicothe, Ohio, U.S.
- Listed height: 6 ft 1 in (1.85 m)
- Listed weight: 196 lb (89 kg)

Career information
- High school: McKell (South Shore, Kentucky)
- College: Cincinnati (1940-1942, 1946)
- NFL draft: 1947: 17th round, 149th overall pick

Career history
- Pittsburgh Steelers (1947–1957)

Awards and highlights
- 3× Pro Bowl (1952, 1953, 1956); Pittsburgh Steelers All-Time Team; Pittsburgh Steelers Legends team; Pittsburgh Steelers Hall of Honor

Career NFL statistics
- Receptions: 329
- Receiving yards: 5,131
- Touchdowns: 37
- Stats at Pro Football Reference

Elbert Everett "Elbie" Nickel (December 28, 1922 – February 27, 2007) was an American professional football player who was a tight end in the National Football League (NFL). He played 11 seasons for the Pittsburgh Steelers (1947–1957).

== Early life ==
Nickel starred in three sports at the University of Cincinnati – he was an end on the football team, a top scorer on the basketball team and a pitcher-outfielder in baseball. His education was put on hold by Army service in World War II. Nickel returned to the University of Cincinnati at the conclusion of World War II and was part of the 1946 University of Cincinnati football team that played in the 1947 Sun Bowl where the University of Cincinnati defeated Virginia Tech. This was the first bowl game for the University of Cincinnati.

== Professional career ==
Entering the 1947 NFL Draft, Nickel was listed at 6'1" and 196 lbs, minuscule for a tight end nowadays, but the game was different back then, and the Steelers would take Nickel in the 17th round with the 149th overall pick. Nickel's career with the Steelers almost didn't happen, since he received an offer from the local Cincinnati Reds to play baseball, but Nickel opted to sign with Pittsburgh and play football instead of baseball. Generally considered one of the best tight ends in Steelers' history, Nickel recorded 329 career receptions as a tight end and is now second in career receptions by a Steelers' tight end behind Heath Miller (592). Nickel was selected to the Pro Bowl three times, 1952, 1953 and 1956. In conjunction with the 2007 celebration of the 75th anniversary of the Steelers, Nickel was selected as one of 33 players on the Pittsburgh Steelers All-Time Team.

== Honors ==
Nickel was selected to the Pittsburgh Steelers' Hall of Honor in 2019 along with tight end, tackle Larry Brown, coach Bill Cowher and wide receiver Hines Ward. In 2022, Nickel was inducted into the Kentucky Pro Football Hall of Fame.

== NFL career statistics ==
Legend
	Led the league
**Bold**	Career high

=== Regular season ===
Year	Team	Games		Receiving				
Year	Team	GP	GS	Rec	Yds	Avg	Lng	TD
1947	PIT	11	1	1	10	10.0	10	0
1948	PIT	12	7	22	324	14.7	35	1
1949	PIT	12	10	26	633	**24.3**	52	3
1950	PIT	12	12	22	527	24.0	65	4
1951	PIT	12	12	28	447	16.0	**77**	3
1952	PIT	12	12	55	**884**	16.1	54	**9**
1953	PIT	12	12	**62**	743	12.0	40	4
1954	PIT	12	12	40	584	14.6	52	5
1955	PIT	12	12	36	488	13.6	30	2
1956	PIT	12	12	27	376	13.9	47	5
1957	PIT	12	4	10	115	11.5	31	1
Career		131	106	329	5,131	15.6	77	37
