= Chick Jagade =

American football player (1926–1968)

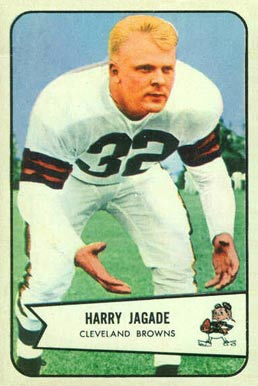
- Jagade on a 1954 Bowman football card

No. 76, 72, 32, 30
- Position: Fullback

Personal information
- Born: December 9, 1926; Chicago, Illinois, U.S.
- Died: November 24, 1968 (aged 41); Washington Island, Wisconsin, U.S.
- Listed height: 6 ft 0 in (1.83 m)
- Listed weight: 220 lb (100 kg)

Career information
- High school: Leyden (Franklin Park, Illinois)
- College: Indiana (1944, 1946–1948)
- NFL draft: 1948: 14th round, 118th overall pick

Career history

Playing
- Baltimore Colts (1949); Cleveland Browns (1951–1953); Chicago Bears (1954–1955)

Coaching
- Chicago Bears (1956) Fullbacks coach

Awards and highlights
- Second-team All-Pro (1953); 2× Pro Bowl (1953, 1954)

Career NFL/AAFC statistics
- Rushing yards: 1,728
- Rushing average: 4.2
- Receptions: 68
- Receiving yards: 628
- Total touchdowns: 14
- Stats at Pro Football Reference

Harry Charles "Chick" Jagade Jr. (December 9, 1926 – November 24, 1968) was an American professional football player who was a fullback in the All-America Football Conference (AAFC) and National Football League (NFL). He played college football as a fullback and linebacker for the Indiana Hoosiers. Jagade broke into professional football in the AAFC in 1949 playing for the Baltimore Colts before embarking on a five year career in the NFL as a member of the Cleveland Browns and Chicago Bears.

== Early life ==
Harry Jagade Jr. — commonly known by the nickname "Chick" — was born December 9, 1926, in Chicago, Illinois. He attended Leyden High School in Franklin Park, Illinois, a suburb of Chicago. His father, Harry C. Jagade Sr., was the plant manager of a Chicago tool and die firm.

Jagade was a four sport athlete in high school, earning athletic letters for four years in football, four years in baseball, and two each in basketball and track and field. An infielder on the baseball diamond, Jagade served as a team captain and helped lead his squad to conference championships in 1942 and 1943. He was named as an All-Conference star in track, setting new conference records both in the speed sport of hurdles and the power sport of shot put, as well as sharing three records with teammates as part of the Heyden High relay team.

His performance on the football field was superlative, earning him honors during his 1943 senior season as an All-Conference and Illinois All-State player and recognition as Most Valuable Player of the year.

== College career ==
Entering the Indiana University Bloomington in 1944, Jagade continued on his path as a multi-sport athlete, earning an athletic scholarship for football but also participating in track and field and baseball for the school. He would earn two athletic letters as a member of the Indiana Hoosiers baseball team.

On the football field Jagade played offensively as a fullback — primarily a blocking and short-yardage running position under head coach Bo McMillan's scheme — and defensively as a linebacker. He was extremely proficient on both sides of the ball.

Jagade did not play college football in 1945. His college career was interrupted with Jagade's March 1945 induction into the military associated with America's ongoing engagement in World War II, still in its final months.

He returned to Indiana in 1946, playing out his sophomore year after a one year delay.

Although best known as a tough fullback, Jagade also won laurels for his defensive work, winning a trophy as Outstanding Player of the 1947 Indiana–Purdue game, an upset win for the Hoosiers, for his linebacking prowess in the contest.

Jagade was lauded by his new head coach, Clyde Smith, after scoring a winning touchdown against the Iowa Hawkeyes during his senior season. "At least five of those Iowa players had a clear shot at Chick, but he was in one of those Jagade moods — he just wouldn't be stopped," Smith said. "He combines that brute strength of his with confidence and courage. No one else on our football team could have made that 35-yard run for the winning touchdown; anyone else would have been stopped on the 20 yard line."

Jagade returned to Indiana for the school's 1948 season but was immediately sidelined by a knee injury that limited his playing time and effectiveness. He nevertheless retained a reputation as a particularly tough runner, called by one observer a runner "with few peers for head-on destructive power."

Jagade capped his college career by being named a participant in the 1949 College All-Star Game in Chicago.

== Professional career ==
Chick Jagade featured as a team star on the cover of a 1949 Baltimore Colts program.

Chick Jagade was selected in the fourteenth round of the 1948 NFL draft, held in December 1947 (one year ahead of his eventual graduation), by the Washington Redskins. He never played with the Redskins, however, instead returning to Indiana for 1948 before signing with the Baltimore Colts of the rival All-America Football Conference (AAFC) ahead of the 1949 season.

He had the honor of scoring the first points of the year against the San Francisco Forty Niners, running a trap play over the left guard to break a 45-yard touchdown run. Jagade's run set a new team record for the longest running play from scrimmage, a record previously held by teammate Lou Gambino. Jagade would see action in 10 games for the Colts during the 1949 AAFC season, starting in three and scoring two touchdowns.

Jagade was out of football in 1950, the year in which the Korean War began.

A return was made to professional football in 1951. From 1951 through 1953, Jagade played for the Cleveland Browns, the four-time AAFC champions who had joined the National Football League (NFL) in 1950. In his first season under the legendary head coach Paul Brown, Jagade was confined to a reserve role, seeing action in 11 games without a single start. He only carried the ball 7 times in the year, gaining 22 of his 30 total yards on one play.

While he came off the bench in 1952, Jagade was the starting fullback for Cleveland during the 1953 Browns season, gaining 344 yards and scoring 4 touchdowns on the ground, while adding another 193 yards on 20 passes caught.

As a member of the Browns, Jagade played in both the 1952 and 1953 NFL Championship Games. He was named a member of the 1953 Pro Bowl team for his performance.

For the 1954 and 1955 seasons Jagade returned home to Chicago as a member of the Chicago Bears. He was once again cast in a starting role, appearing in 23 of the 24 games the Bears played in those seasons, with 21 starts over that period. His career best in rushing yardage came in 1954, when he gained 498 yards on the ground, although his 3.2 yards per carry average that season was topped by all five of his other seasons in the league.

He remained with the team in 1956 in the role of player-coach.

== NFL/AAFC career statistics ==
Legend
	Led the league
**Bold**	Career high

=== Regular season ===
Year	Team	Games		Rushing					Receiving				
Year	Team	GP	GS	Att	Yds	Avg	Lng	TD	Rec	Yds	Avg	Lng	TD
1949	BCL	10	3	33	174	5.3	-	2	8	44	5.5	-	0
1951	CLE	11	0	7	30	4.3	22	0	0	0	0.0	-	0
1952	CLE	12	3	57	373	**6.5**	30	2	9	**203**	**22.6**	**47**	**1**
1953	CLE	12	12	86	344	4.0	23	**4**	20	193	9.7	37	0
1954	CHI	11	10	**157**	**498**	3.2	46	3	**24**	172	7.2	26	0
1955	CHI	12	11	72	309	4.3	**51**	2	7	16	2.3	15	0
		68	39	412	1,728	4.2	51	13	68	628	9.2	47	1

=== Playoffs ===
Year	Team	Games		Rushing					Receiving				
Year	Team	GP	GS	Att	Yds	Avg	Lng	TD	Rec	Yds	Avg	Lng	TD
1951	CLE	1	0	0	0	0.0	0	0	0	0	0.0	0	0
1952	CLE	1	1	**15**	**104**	**6.9**	29	**1**	0	0	0.0	0	0
1953	CLE	1	1	**15**	102	6.8	**30**	**1**	**1**	**18**	**18.0**	**18**	0
		3	2	30	206	6.9	30	2	1	18	18.0	18	0

== Life after football ==
After retirement from football, Jagade lived in Glenview, Illinois with his wife, the former Ada Lee Bozarth, whom he married in 1949, and the couple's three children.

Even during his career as a professional football player, Jagade worked in the off-season as superintendent of a tool and die factory on the northwest side of Chicago.

== Death and legacy ==
On November 24, 1968, Jagade was hunting with friends on Washington Island, located in Wisconsin just off the peninsula at the northern tip of Green Bay. Jagade successfully shot a deer and was dragging it out from where it had fallen when he was stricken with a fatal heart attack. He was pronounced dead at the scene.

Chick Jagade was 41 years old at the time of his death.

Deadly heart attacks seem to have run in the Jagade family, with Chick's father, Harry C. Jagade Sr., suddenly dying of the same ailment almost exactly twenty years earlier when he was visiting the University of Indiana campus in Bloomington in May 1948 for a "Cream and Crimson Day" athletics celebration.
