= Warren Lahr =

American football player (1923–1969)

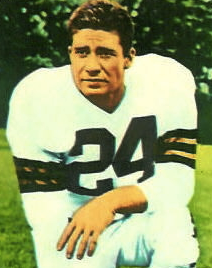
- Lahr on a 1954 football card

No. 80, 24
- Position: Safety

Personal information
- Born: September 5, 1923; Mount Zion, Pennsylvania, U.S.
- Died: January 19, 1969 (aged 45); Aurora, Ohio, U.S.
- Listed height: 5 ft 11 in (1.80 m)
- Listed weight: 189 lb (86 kg)

Career information
- High school: West Wyoming (West Wyoming, Pennsylvania)
- College: Western Reserve (1941-1942, 1946-1947)
- NFL draft: 1947: 32nd round, 294th overall pick

Career history
- Cleveland Browns (1949–1959)

Awards and highlights
- 3× NFL champion (1950, 1954, 1955); AAFC champion (1949); First-team All-Pro (1951); 4× Second-team All-Pro (1952–1955); Pro Bowl (1953); Cleveland Browns Legends

Career NFL/AAFC statistics
- Interceptions: 44
- Fumble recoveries: 4
- Total touchdowns: 6
- Stats at Pro Football Reference

Warren Emmett Lahr (September 5, 1923 – January 19, 1969) was an American professional football player who was a safety who played for the Cleveland Browns for 11 seasons, mainly in the 1950s. When he retired, he had the most career interceptions in Browns team history with 44.

Lahr grew up in Pennsylvania and starred on the West Wyoming High School football team. After graduating in 1941, he attended Western Reserve University in Cleveland, Ohio and played football for the Red Cats as a reserve in 1942. He then served for three years in the U.S. Navy during World War II. He returned to Western Reserve in 1946 and became a star for the team as a left halfback for two seasons.

Lahr was selected by the Pittsburgh Steelers of the National Football League (NFL) in the 1947 draft. However, he signed with the Browns of the rival All-America Football Conference (AAFC). Lahr sat out the 1948 season with an injured knee, but quickly became a regular on defense the following season. He stayed with the Browns through 1959, a period during which the team won one AAFC championship and three NFL championships after merging into that league in 1950.

Lahr has the second-most career interceptions in Browns history, trailing only Thom Darden, who passed him with his 45th and final interception in 1981. After leaving the Browns, Lahr settled in Aurora, Ohio and served as a color commentator for Browns games between 1963 and 1967. He died of a heart attack in 1969 at the age of 45.

== Early life and college ==
Lahr Grew up in West Wyoming, Pennsylvania, a small town in the eastern part of the state. He attended West Wyoming High School, where he was a standout on the football team. However, West Wyoming did not have a strong team, and Lahr's only college scholarship offer came from Western Reserve University, a small school in Cleveland, Ohio. Lahr graduated in 1941 and enrolled at Western Reserve.

Lahr began as a reserve player under Western Reserve head coach Tom Davies in 1942, when he was a sophomore. He played halfback for the Western Reserve Red Cats. However, his college career was interrupted by three years of service in the U.S. Navy during World War II. Lahr returned to Western Reserve in 1946 and had a successful junior season as a left halfback. The Red Cats went undefeated against the three other rival Cleveland schools of the Big Four Conference, and Lahr was named to the 11-member All-Big Four city all-star team after the season. He also won the school's Jack Dempsey Adam Hat trophy for his performance.

Lahr figured prominently in Western Reserve's offense as a senior in 1947. He was switched from halfback to quarterback midway through the season. However, the team was less successful than the previous year.

After the season, officials at the Mid-American Conference, of which Western Reserve was a member, ruled that Lahr and other players who had served in the war could have an extra year of eligibility to play football. Lahr had exhausted his eligibility by playing in 1942, 1946 and 1947, but was not expected to have enough course credits to graduate until 1949. However, Lahr decided to forgo his extra year at Western Reserve and signed with the Cleveland Browns, a professional team in the All-America Football Conference (AAFC) coached by Paul Brown. Lahr was also selected by the National Football League's Pittsburgh Steelers late in the NFL draft.

== Professional career ==
Lahr came to the Browns in 1948 as a third-string quarterback, but had to sit out while recovering from a knee injury he suffered before the season began. The Browns went undefeated in 1948 and won a third straight AAFC championship.

Lahr's first playing time with the team came in 1949, when Cleveland again won the AAFC championship. Brown came close to cutting Lahr when he made a mistake on defense during a preseason game against the San Francisco 49ers. However, Lahr made the team and started the year as a left halfback. He was switched to safety in the middle of the season and played primarily on defense after Browns starter Cliff Lewis was injured. Substituting for Lewis, Lahr quickly became a regular starter on defense and finished the year with four interceptions. One of his interceptions came at the end of a divisional playoff game against the Buffalo Bills and helped the Browns retain a 24–21 lead.

The AAFC dissolved after the 1949 season and the Browns were absorbed by the NFL. Lahr stayed with the team after the transition and was a mainstay of the defensive backfield throughout the 1950s, playing opposite Tommy James. The Browns won the NFL championship in their first year in the league, when Lahr recorded eight interceptions, including two he ran back for touchdowns. He had two interceptions in the Browns' 30–28 win over the Los Angeles Rams in the championship game.

Lahr continued to play mainly as a defensive left halfback in the following seasons, although he spent time at safety in 1952 and his final season in 1959. The Browns advanced to the NFL championship each year between 1951 and 1953, but lost once to the Rams and twice to the Detroit Lions. Lahr was named a first-team All-Pro by sportswriters in 1951, when he had five interceptions and returned two of them for touchdowns. His blown coverage on a late-game touchdown catch by Jim Doran of the Lions in the 1953 championship was a major factor in the Browns loss. He was nevertheless named to the Pro Bowl after the season, having made five interceptions and returned them for 119 yards. The Browns repeated as NFL champions in 1954 and 1955 behind a strong defense and an offensive attack led by quarterback Otto Graham. Lahr was named a first-team All-Pro for the second time in 1956.

Cleveland reached the NFL championship in 1957, losing to the Lions, and made the playoffs in 1958. Lahr stayed with the Browns through the 1959 season, when he was switched from defensive halfback to safety. He had 44 interceptions in his Browns career, which stood as the record for most team interceptions by a Browns player until it was later broken by Thom Darden. He also ran back five interceptions for touchdowns, which remains a team record.

== Later life and death ==
After retiring from football, Lahr settled in Aurora, Ohio and served as the color commentator alongside announcer Ken Coleman and Frank Glieber for Browns games broadcast on WJW channel 8 in Cleveland between 1963 and 1967. He was dropped when CBS made changes to its broadcasting lineup in 1968, but continued to work on preseason games. He also worked as a sales agent for Lax Industries in Cleveland and ran a sporting goods business with his close friend Ed Lewis, the athletic director at Adelbert College, which was part of Western Reserve.

Lahr died unexpectedly of a heart attack in 1969, when he was 45 years old. He had recently passed a physical examination, but had come down with the flu the previous week. He and his wife, Rowena, had five daughters. In 2008, Lahr was named a Browns Legend, an honor given by the franchise to a selection of the best players in its history.
