= 1953 Washington Redskins season =

National Football League team season

- Owner: George Preston Marshall
- General manager: Dick McCann
- Head coach: Curly Lambeau
- Home stadium: Griffith Stadium

Results
- Record: 6–5–1
- Division place: 3rd NFL Eastern
- Playoffs: Did not qualify

The 1953 Washington Redskins season was the franchise's 22nd season in the National Football League (NFL) and their 16th in Washington, D.C. The team improved on their 4–8 record from 1952 and finished 6–5–1.

Although the NFL formally desegregated in 1946, many teams were slow to allow black athletes to compete even after the formal barrier had fallen. None were less willing to desegregate than the Washington Redskins, who sought to be the "home team" for a vast Southern market. The Redskins would remain the last bastion of racial segregation in the NFL, refusing to include a single black player on their roster until 1962.

== Preseason ==
Week	Date	Opponent	Result	Record	Venue	Attendance
1	August 19	at Los Angeles Rams	L 7–20	0–1	Los Angeles Memorial Coliseum	82,678
2	August 30	at San Francisco 49ers	L 0–7	0–2	Kezar Stadium	25,874
3	September 5	at Green Bay Packers	W 13–6	1–2	City Stadium	16,425
4	September 9	vs. Pittsburgh Steelers	L 14–21	1–3	Carolina Stadium (Columbia, SC)	22,000
5	September 13	vs. Detroit Lions	L 17–31	1–4	Civic Stadium (Buffalo, NY)	23,088
6	September 20	at Baltimore Colts	L 3–9	1–5	Baltimore Memorial Stadium	22,800

== Regular season ==
=== Schedule ===
Week	Date	Opponent	Result	Record	Venue	Attendance	Recap
1	September 27	at **Chicago Cardinals**	**W** 24–13	1–0	Comiskey Park	16,055	Recap
2	October 2	at **Philadelphia Eagles**	**T** 21–21	1–0–1	Connie Mack Stadium	19,099	Recap
3	October 11	**New York Giants**	**W** 13–9	2–0–1	Griffith Stadium	26,241	Recap
4	October 18	**Cleveland Browns**	**L** 14–30	2–1–1	Griffith Stadium	33,963	Recap
5	October 25	at Baltimore Colts	**L** 17–27	2–2–1	Memorial Stadium	34,031	Recap
6	November 1	at **Cleveland Browns**	**L** 3–27	2–3–1	Cleveland Municipal Stadium	47,845	Recap
7	November 8	**Chicago Cardinals**	**W** 28–17	3–3–1	Griffith Stadium	19,654	Recap
8	November 15	Chicago Bears	**L** 24–27	3–4–1	Griffith Stadium	21,392	Recap
9	November 22	at **New York Giants**	**W** 24–21	4–4–1	Polo Grounds	16,887	Recap
10	November 29	at **Pittsburgh Steelers**	**W** 17–9	5–4–1	Forbes Field	17,026	Recap
11	December 6	**Philadelphia Eagles**	**W** 10–0	6–4–1	Griffith Stadium	21,579	Recap
12	December 13	**Pittsburgh Steelers**	**L** 13–14	6–5–1	Griffith Stadium	22,057	Recap
Note: Intra-conference opponents are in **bold** text.

== Standings ==
NFL Eastern Conference
	W	L	T	PCT	CONF	PF	PA	STK
Cleveland Browns	11	1	0	.917	9–1	348	162	L1
Philadelphia Eagles	7	4	1	.636	6–3–1	352	215	W1
Washington Redskins	6	5	1	.545	6–3–1	208	215	L1
Pittsburgh Steelers	6	6	0	.500	5–5	211	263	W2
New York Giants	3	9	0	.250	3–7	179	277	L2
Chicago Cardinals	1	10	1	.091	0–10	190	337	W1

Note: Tie games were not officially counted in the standings until 1972.

== Personnel ==
=== Roster ===
1953 Washington Redskins roster
Quarterbacks (QB): 14 Eddie LeBaron P; 18 Jack Scarbath; Running backs (RB): 45 Sam Baker P; 29 Paul Barry; 35 Bill Dudley; 12 Harry Gilmer QB/S; 32 Leon Heath; 22 Charlie Justice; 25 John Papit; 20 Julie Rykovich; Wide receivers (WR): 83 Paul Dekker; 82 Fran Polsfoot; 84 Hugh Taylor; Tight ends (TE)	Offensive linemen (OL): 62 Don Boll T; 65 Jim Clark T/G; 53 Al DeMao C; 61 Gene Pepper G; 50 Harry Ulinski C/LB; 63 Cas Witucki G; Defensive linemen (DL): 80 Gene Brito DE/WR; 76 Paul Lipscomb DT/DE; 70 Dick Modzelewski DT; 74 Laurie Niemi DT/DE; 55 Jim Ricca MG/T; 89 Joe Tereshinski DE/LB	Linebackers (LB): 34 Jack Cloud FB; 36 Chuck Drazenovich FB; 68 Knox Ramsey G; Defensive backs (DB): 42 Dick Alban CB; 46 Don Doll S; 44 Harry Dowda CB; 23 Hall Haynes CB/S; 43 Johnny Williams S; Special teams (ST)	Reserve: -- Bill Cox S/WR (Military); -- Al Dorow QB (Military); -- Rob Goode RB (Military); 79 Bill Hegarty T (IR); 88 Jerry Hennessy DE (IR); -- Chet Ostrowski DE (Military); -- Vic Thomas T (Military); -- Walt Yowarsky DE (Military); Rookies in italics
