= 1953 Philadelphia Eagles season =

NFL team season

- Owner: Happy Hundred
- Head coach: Jim Trimble
- Home stadium: Shibe Park

Results
- Record: 7–4–1
- Division place: 2nd NFL Eastern
- Playoffs: Did not qualify

The 1953 Philadelphia Eagles season was their 21st in the league. The team improved on their previous output of 7–5, going 7–4–1. The team failed to qualify for the playoffs for the fourth consecutive season.

== Off Season ==
At the end of the 1952 season, 2-year player Bud Grant is offered a pay raise in his contract. He chooses to play football in the CFL(Canadian Football League) instead. He would have a career worthy of being named to the CFL's Hall of Fame as a player. Later on he would make the Pro Football Hall of Fame as coach of the Minnesota Vikings.

The Eagles held training camp at Hershey Park Stadium in Hershey, PA for the 3rd straight year.

Matt Guokas, Sr. is hired to be the PA announcer for the Eagles. Guokas played basketball for Saint Joseph's Hawks in college and the Philadelphia Warriors in the NBA. After losing his right leg in an automobile accident, Guokas turned to broadcasting, and he served as an announcer for the N Philadelphia Eagles for 32 years from 1953 to 1985.

=== NFL draft ===
The 1953 NFL draft was held on January 22, 1953. There was 30 rounds in the draft with 12 teams picking. The San Francisco 49ers received this year's Lottery bonus pick. With this pick they chose Harry Babcock an end out of University of Georgia.

The 1952 expansion team Dallas Texans (NFL) folded during the 1952 season and then became the Baltimore Colts on January 23, 1953. The Colts had the number 1 pick and choose Heisman Trophy winner Billy Vessels a Halfback out of University of Oklahoma.

With a 7–5 record in 1952 the Eagles got the 7th, 8th or 9th pick in the 30 rounds. With trading away their 1st round pick the Eagles 1st selection was the 7th pick in the 2nd round, 20th overall, they chose Al Conway a Back out of Army and William Jewell College. He did not play due to injury and ended up as an official in the American Football League and an official in the NFL for 28 years.

=== Player selections ===
The table shows the Eagles selections and what picks they had that were traded away and the team that ended up with that pick. It is possible the Eagles' pick ended up with this team via another team that the Eagles made a trade with. Not shown are acquired picks that the Eagles traded away.

| = Pro Bowler | = Hall of Famer |

| Rd | Pick | Player | Position | School | Rd | Pick | Player | Position | School |
|---|---|---|---|---|---|---|---|---|---|
| 1 | 7 | ^{Pick Traded to Los; Angeles Rams} | | | 2 | 20 | Al Conway | Back | Army and William Jewell College |
| 3 | 34 | Don Johnson | Back | California | 4 | 45 | George Mrkonic | Guard | Kansas |
| 5 | 56 | Eddie Bell | End | Pennsylvania | 5 | 61 | Rex Smith^{(pick from Detroit Lions)} | End | Illinois |
| 6 | 70 | ^{Pick Traded to Chicago Cardinals} | | | 7 | 76 | Jack Erickson^{pick from Chicago Cardinals} | Tackle | Army/Beloit |
| 7 | 81 | Ray Malavasi | Guard | Army/Mississippi State | 8 | 92 | Jess Richardson | Tackle | Alabama |
| 9 | 106 | Roger French | End | Minnesota | 10 | 117 | Tom Brookshier | Back | Colorado |
| 11 | 128 | Bob Pollard | Back | Penn State | 12 | 142 | George Porter | Tackle | San Jose State |
| 13 | 153 | Ray Westort | Guard | Utah | 14 | 164 | Roy Bailey | Back | Tulane |
| 15 | 178 | Willie Irvin | End | Florida A&M | 16 | 189 | Bud Wallace | Back | North Carolina |
| 17 | 200 | Tony Rados | Back | Penn State | 18 | 214 | Marv Trauth | Tackle | Mississippi |
| 19 | 225 | Pete Bachouros | Back | Illinois | 20 | 236 | Rollie Arns | Center | Iowa State |
| 21 | 250 | Hal Brooks | Tackle | Washington & Lee | 22 | 261 | Laurie LeClaire | Back | Michigan |
| 23 | 272 | Jeff Knox | End | Georgia Tech | 24 | 286 | Eli Romero | Back | Wichita State |
| 25 | 297 | Johnny Michels | Guard | Tennessee | 26 | 308 | Harvey Achziger | Tackle | Colorado State |
| 27 | 322 | Earl Hersh | Back | West Chester | 28 | 333 | Joe Gratson | Back | Penn State |
| 29 | 344 | Ralph Paolone | Back | Kentucky | 30 | 357 | Chuck Hren | Back | Northwestern |

== Schedule ==
| Game | Date | Opponent | Result | Record | Venue | Attendance | Recap | Sources |
|---|---|---|---|---|---|---|---|---|
| 1 | September 27 | at San Francisco 49ers | L 21–31 | 0–1 | Kezar Stadium | 44,587 | Recap | |
| 2 | October 2 | Washington Redskins | T 21–21 | 0–1–1 | Shibe Park | 19,099 | Recap | |
| 3 | October 10 | at Cleveland Browns | L 13–37 | 0–2–1 | Cleveland Stadium | 48,502 | Recap | |
| 4 | October 17 | Pittsburgh Steelers | W 23–7 | 1–2–1 | Pitt Stadium | 18,681 | Recap | |
| 5 | October 25 | at Chicago Cardinals | W 56–17 | 2–2–1 | Comiskey Park | 22,064 | Recap | |
| 6 | November 1 | at Pittsburgh Steelers | W 35–7 | 3–2–1 | Forbes Field | 27,547 | Recap | |
| 7 | November 8 | New York Giants | W 30–7 | 4–2–1 | Shibe Park | 24,331 | Recap | |
| 8 | November 15 | Baltimore Colts | W 45–14 | 5–2–1 | Memorial Stadium | 27,813 | Recap | |
| 9 | November 21 | Chicago Cardinals | W 38–0 | 6–2–1 | Shibe Park | 19,402 | Recap | |
| 10 | November 29 | at New York Giants | L 28–37 | 6–3–1 | Polo Grounds | 20,294 | Recap | |
| 11 | December 6 | at Washington Redskins | L 0–10 | 6–4–1 | Griffith Stadium | 21,579 | Recap | |
| 12 | December 13 | Cleveland Browns | W 42–27 | 7–4–1 | Shibe Park | 38,654 | Recap | |

== Standings ==
Program for the October 17 game with the Pittsburgh Steelers.

NFL Eastern Conference
| | W | L | T | PCT | CONF | PF | PA | STK |
|---|---|---|---|---|---|---|---|---|
| Cleveland Browns | 11 | 1 | 0 | .917 | 9–1 | 348 | 162 | L1 |
| Philadelphia Eagles | 7 | 4 | 1 | .636 | 6–3–1 | 352 | 215 | W1 |
| Washington Redskins | 6 | 5 | 1 | .545 | 6–3–1 | 208 | 215 | L1 |
| Pittsburgh Steelers | 6 | 6 | 0 | .500 | 5–5 | 211 | 263 | W2 |
| New York Giants | 3 | 9 | 0 | .250 | 3–7 | 179 | 277 | L2 |
| Chicago Cardinals | 1 | 10 | 1 | .091 | 0–10 | 190 | 337 | W1 |

Note: Tie games were not officially counted in the standings until 1972.

== Game recaps ==
=== Week 1 @ San Francisco ===
Week 1: Philadelphia Eagles 21 (0–1–0) at San Francisco 49ers 31 (1–0–0) – Game summary

| Quarter | 1 | 2 | 3 | 4 | Total |
|---|---|---|---|---|---|
| Philadelphia Eagles | 7 | 0 | 7 | 7 | 21 |
| San Francisco 49ers | 14 | 3 | 7 | 7 | 31 |

at Kezar Stadium, San Francisco, California

- Date: September 27, 1953
- Game time: ? PM PST
- Game attendance: 27,819
- Recap and Stats

Game information

1st

- 49ers – Joe Arenas 18-yard pass from Y.A. Tittle (Gordie Soltau kick)
- Eagles – Adrian Burk 1-yard rush (Bobby Walston kick)
- 49ers – Y.A. Tittle 1-yard rush (Gordie Soltau kick)

2nd

- 49ers – Gordie Soltau 39-yard field goal

3rd

- 49ers – Billy Wilson 39-yard pass from Y.A. Tittle (Gordie Soltau kick)
- Eagles – Bobby Walston 3-yard pass from Adrian Burk (Bobby Walston kick)

4th

- 49ers – Billy Wilson 37-yard pass from Y.A. Tittle (Gordie Soltau kick)
- Eagles – Pete Pihos 10-yard pass from Bobby Thomason (Al Pollard kick)

=== Week 2 vs Washington ===
The Eagles inability to hold onto the ball allows the Washington Redskins to tie them at 21 – 21. The Eagles allowed 4 interceptions and would lose 1 fumble as they allowed Washington to gain 182 yards on 9 completions. The Eagles also hurt their cause by having 10 penalties for 99 yards called against them.

Week 2:Philadelphia Eagles 21 (0–1–1) vs Washington Redskins 21 (1–1–0) – Game summary

| Quarter | 1 | 2 | 3 | 4 | Total |
|---|---|---|---|---|---|
| Washington Redskins | 7 | 7 | 7 | 0 | 21 |
| Philadelphia Eagles | 7 | 7 | 0 | 7 | 21 |

at Shibe Park, Philadelphia, PA

- Date: October 2, 1953
- Game time: ? PM EST
- Game attendance: 19,099
- Recap and Stats

Game information

1st

- Eagles – Pete Pihos 6-yard pass from Adrian Burk (Bobby Walston kick) Phila 7 – 0
- Redskins – Laurie Niemi unknown-yard fumble return (Bill Dudley kick) Tied 7 – 7

2nd

- Eagles – Pete Pihos 10-yard pass from Bobby Thomason (Bobby Walston kick) Phila 14 – 7
- Redskins – Hugh Taylor 24-yard pass from Jack Scarbath (Bill Dudley kick) Tied 14 – 14

3rd

- Redskins – Hugh Taylor 61-yard pass from Jack Scarbath (Bill Dudley kick) Wash 21 – 14

4th

- Eagles – Adrian Burk 1-yard rush (Bobby Walston kick) Tied 21 – 21

=== Week 3 @ Cleveland Browns ===
Week 3: Philadelphia Eagles 13 (0–2–1) at Cleveland Browns 37 (3–0–0) – Game summary

| Quarter | 1 | 2 | 3 | 4 | Total |
|---|---|---|---|---|---|
| Philadelphia Eagles | 6 | 0 | 7 | 0 | 13 |
| Cleveland Browns | 6 | 7 | 14 | 10 | 37 |

at Cleveland Stadium in Cleveland, Ohio

- Date: October 10, 1953
- Game time: ? PM EST
- Game attendance: 45,802
- Recap and Stats

Game information

1st

- Browns – Lou Groza 20-yard field goal Cleve 3 – 0
- Browns – Lou Groza 16-yard field goal Cleve 6 – 0
- Eagles – Frank Ziegler 1-yard rush (kick failed) Tied 6 – 6

2nd

- Browns – Chick Jagade 14-yard rush (Lou Groza kick) Cleve 13 – 6
- Browns – Dante Lavelli 25-yard pass from Otto Graham (Lou Groza kick) Cleve 20 – 6

3rd

- Eagles – Adrian Burk 32-yard rush (Bobby Walston kick) Cleve 20 – 13
- Browns – Chick Jagade 13-yard rush (Lou Groza kick) Cleve 27 – 13

4th

- Browns – Lou Groza 27-yard field goal Cleve 30 – 13
- Browns – Jerry Helluin 42-yard fumble return (Lou Groza kick) Cleve 37 – 13

=== Week 4 vs Pittsburgh Steelers ===
Week 4: Philadelphia Eagles 26 (1–2–1) vs Pittsburgh Steelers 7 (2–2–0) – Game summary

| Quarter | 1 | 2 | 3 | 4 | Total |
|---|---|---|---|---|---|
| Pittsburgh Steelers | 0 | 0 | 7 | 0 | 7 |
| Philadelphia Eagles | 0 | 0 | 6 | 17 | 23 |

at Shibe Park, Philadelphia, PA

- Date: October 17, 1953
- Game time: ? PM EST
- Game attendance: 18,681
- Recap and Stats

Game information

3rd

- Eagles – Pete Pihos 28-yard pass from Adrian Burk (kick failed) Phila 6 – 0
- Steelers – Ray Mathews 23-yard pass from Jim Finks (Nick Bolkovac kick) Pitt 7 – 6

4th

- Eagles – Bobby Walston 11-yard field goal Phila 9 – 7
- Eagles – Hal Giancanelli 16-yard pass from Bobby Thomason (Bobby Walston kick) Phila 16 – 7
- Eagles – Frank Ziegler 1-yard rush (Bobby Walston kick) Phila 23 – 7

=== Week 5 @ Chicago Cardinals ===
Week 5:Philadelphia Eagles 56 (4–6–0) at Chicago Cardinals 17 (6–4–0) – Game summary

| Quarter | 1 | 2 | 3 | 4 | Total |
|---|---|---|---|---|---|
| Philadelphia Eagles | 7 | 21 | 7 | 21 | 56 |
| Chicago Cardinals | 3 | 0 | 0 | 14 | 17 |

at Comiskey Park, Chicago, IL

- Date: October 25, 1953
- Game time: ? PM CST
- Game attendance: 22,064
- Recap and Stats

Game information

1st

- Cardinals – Pat Summerall 28-yard field goal Chi C 3 – 0
- Eagles – Toy Ledbetter 34-yard pass from Bobby Thomason (Bobby Walston kick) Phila 7 – 3

2nd

- Eagles – Jim Parmer 1-yard rush (Bobby Walston kick) Phila 14 – 3
- Eagles – Frank Ziegler 52-yard rush (Bobby Walston kick) Phila 21 – 3
- Eagles – Pete Pihos 6-yard pass from Adrian Burk (Bobby Walston kick) Phila 28 – 3

3rd

- Eagles – Hal Giancanelli 28-yard pass from Bobby Thomason (Bobby Walston kick) Phila 35 – 3

4th

- Cardinals – Charlie Trippi 8-yard pass from Jim Root (Pat Summerall kick) Phila 35 – 10
- Cardinals – Billy Cross 51-yard pass from Jim Root (Pat Summerall kick) Phila 35 – 17
- Eagles – Jim Parmer 7-yard rush (Bobby Walston kick) Phila 42 – 17
- Eagles – Tom Scott unknown-yard fumble return (Bobby Walston kick) Phila 49 – 17
- Eagles – John Brewer 9-yard rush (Bobby Walston kick) Phila 56 – 17

=== Week 6 @ Pittsburgh Steelers ===
Week 6:Philadelphia Eagles 35 (3–2–1) at Pittsburgh Steelers 7 (3–3–0) – Game summary

| Quarter | 1 | 2 | 3 | 4 | Total |
|---|---|---|---|---|---|
| Philadelphia Eagles | 14 | 7 | 0 | 14 | 35 |
| Pittsburgh Steelers | 0 | 7 | 0 | 0 | 7 |

at Pitt Stadium, Pittsburgh, PA

- Date: November 1, 1953
- Game time: ? PM EST
- Game attendance: 27,547
- Recap and Stats

Game information

1st

- Eagles Hal Giancanelli 7-yard rush (Bobby Walston kick) Phila 7 – 0
- Eagles Jerry Williams 48-yard rush (Bobby Walston kick) Phila 14 – 0

2nd

- Eagles Bobby Walston 21-yard pass from Bobby Thomason (Bobby Walston kick) Phila 21 – 0
- Steelers Ray Mathews 11-yard pass from Jim Finks (Nick Bolkovac kick) Phila 21 – 7

4th

- Eagles Pete Pihos 26-yard pass from Bobby Thomason (Bobby Walston kick) Phila 28 – 7
- Eagles Hal Giancanelli 8-yard pass from Bobby Thomason (Bobby Walston kick) Phila 35 – 7

=== Week 7 vs New York Giants ===
Week 7: Philadelphia Eagles 30 (4–2–0) vs New York Giants 7 (2–5–0) – Game summary

| Quarter | 1 | 2 | 3 | 4 | Total |
|---|---|---|---|---|---|
| New York Giants | 0 | 0 | 0 | 7 | 7 |
| Philadelphia Eagles | 3 | 14 | 6 | 7 | 30 |

at Shibe Park, Philadelphia, PA

- Date: November 8, 1953
- Game time: ? PM EST
- Game attendance: 24,331
- Recap and Stats

Game information

1st

- Eagles – Bobby Walston 15-yard field goal Phila 0 – 3

2nd

- Eagles – Bobby Walston 62-yard pass from Bobby Thomason (Bobby Walston kick) Phila 0 – 10
- Eagles – Pete Pihos 32-yard pass from Bobby Thomason (Bobby Walston kick) Phila 0 –

3rd

- Eagles – Pete Pihos 8-yard pass from Bobby Thomason (kick failed) Phila 0 – 23

4th

- Eagles – Bobby Walston 13-yard pass from Bobby Thomason (Bobby Walston kick) Phila 0 – 30
- Giants – Frank Gifford 32-yard pass from Charlie Conerly (Frank Gifford kick) Phila 7 – 30

=== Week 8 vs Baltimore Colts ===
Week 8: Philadelphia Eagles 45 (5–2–1) at Baltimore Colts 14 (3–5–0) – Game summary

| Quarter | 1 | 2 | 3 | 4 | Total |
|---|---|---|---|---|---|
| Baltimore Colts | 7 | 0 | 0 | 7 | 14 |
| Philadelphia Eagles | 7 | 14 | 0 | 24 | 45 |

at Shibe Park, Philadelphia, PA

- Date: November 15, 1953
- Game time: ? PM EST
- Game attendance: 27,813
- Recap and Stats

Game information

1st

- Colts – Buddy Young 104-yard kickoff return (Buck McPhail kick) Balti 7 – 0
- Eagles – Hal Giancanelli 47-yard pass from Bobby Thomason (Bobby Walston kick) Tied 7 – 7

2nd

- Eagles – Pete Pihos 56-yard pass from Bobby Thomason (Bobby Walston kick) Phila 7 – 14
- Eagles – Don Johnson 24-yard pass from Bobby Thomason (Bobby Walston kick) Phila 7 – 21

4th

- Eagles – Don Johnson 3-yard rush (Bobby Walston kick) Phila 7 – 28
- Eagles – Don Johnson 66-yard rush (Bobby Walston kick) Phila 7 – 35
- Eagles – Bobby Walston 22-yard field goal Phila 7 – 38
- Colts – Bert Rechichar 66-yard pass from Jack Del Bello (Buck McPhail kick) Phila 14 – 38
- Eagles – Chuck Bednarik 26-yard interception return (Bobby Walston kick) Phila 14 – 45

=== Week 9 vs Chicago Cardinals ===
Week 9: Philadelphia Eagles 38 (6–2–1) vs Chicago Cardinals (0–8–1) 0 (4–3–0) – Game summary

| Quarter | 1 | 2 | 3 | 4 | Total |
|---|---|---|---|---|---|
| Chicago Cardinals | 0 | 0 | 0 | 0 | 0 |
| Philadelphia Eagles | 14 | 10 | 7 | 7 | 38 |

at Shibe Park, Philadelphia, PA

- Date: November 21, 1953
- Game time: ? PM EST
- Game attendance: 19,402
- Recap and Stats

Game information

1st

- Eagles – Frank Ziegler 1-yard rush (Bobby Walston kick) Phila 0 – 7
- Eagles – Hal Giancanelli 37-yard pass from Bobby Thomason (Bobby Walston kick) Phila 0 – 14

2nd

- Eagles – Bobby Walston 27-yard field goal Phila 0 – 17
- Eagles – Jerry Williams 1-yard rush (Bobby Walston kick) Phila 0 – 24

3rd

- Eagles – Jerry Williams 4-yard rush (Bobby Walston kick) Phila 0 – 31

4th

- Eagles – Don Johnson 2-yard rush (Bobby Walston kick) Phila 0 – 38

=== Week 10 @ New York Giants ===
Week 10: Philadelphia Eagles 28 (6–3–1) at New York Giants 37 (7–3–0) – Game summary

| Quarter | 1 | 2 | 3 | 4 | Total |
|---|---|---|---|---|---|
| Philadelphia Eagles | 7 | 7 | 14 | 0 | 28 |
| New York Giants | 7 | 7 | 13 | 10 | 37 |

at Polo Grounds, New York, NY

- Date: November 29, 1953
- Game time: ? PM EST
- Game attendance: 20,294
- Recap and Stats

Game information

1st

- Giants – Frank Gifford 8-yard rush (Randy Clay kick) NY G 0 – 7
- Eagles – Frank Ziegler 2-yard rush (Bobby Walston kick) NY G 7 – 7

2nd

- Giants – Kyle Rote 1-yard rush (Randy Clay kick) NY G 7 – 14
- Eagles – Jerry Williams 33-yard pass from Bobby Thomason (Bobby Walston kick) NY G 14 – 14

3rd

- Giants – Kyle Rote 30-yard pass from Charlie Conerly (Randy Clay kick) NY G 14 – 21
- Eagles – Don Johnson 21-yard pass from Bobby Thomason (Bobby Walston kick) NY G 21 – 21
- Giants – Kyle Rote 25-yard pass from Charlie Conerly (kick failed) NY G 21 – 27
- Eagles – Don Johnson 63-yard rush (Bobby Walston kick) NY G 28 – 27

4th

- Giants – Eddie Price 31-yard pass from Charlie Conerly (Randy Clay kick) NY G 28 – 34
- Giants – Randy Clay 17-yard field goal NY G 28 – 37

=== Week 11 @ Washington Redskins ===
Week 11:Philadelphia Eagles 21 (6–4–1) at Washington Redskins 21 (6–4–1) – Game summary

| Quarter | 1 | 2 | 3 | 4 | Total |
|---|---|---|---|---|---|
| Philadelphia Eagles | 0 | 0 | 0 | 0 | 0 |
| Washington Redskins | 0 | 0 | 0 | 10 | 10 |

at Griffith Stadium, Washington, D.C.

- Date: December 6, 1953
- Game time: ? PM EST
- Game attendance: 21,579
- Recap and Stats

Game information

4th

- Redskins – Bill Dudley 15-yard field goal Wash 3 – 0
- Redskins – Harry Dowda 23-yard interception return (Bill Dudley kick) Wash 10 – 0

=== Week 12 vs Cleveland Browns ===
The Eagles give the Cleveland Browns their only loss of the regular season in the final week of the season. Cleveland would have 3 turn overs during the game.

Week 12: Philadelphia Eagles 42 (7–4–1) vs Cleveland Browns 27 (11–1–0) – Game summary

| Quarter | 1 | 2 | 3 | 4 | Total |
|---|---|---|---|---|---|
| Cleveland Browns | 10 | 3 | 7 | 7 | 27 |
| Philadelphia Eagles | 0 | 14 | 14 | 14 | 42 |

at Shibe Park, Philadelphia, Pennsylvania

- Date: December 13, 1953
- Game time: ? pm EST
- Game attendance: 38,654
- Recap and Stats

Game information

1st

- Browns – Ray Renfro 11-yard rush (Lou Groza kick) Cleve 7 – Phila 0
- Browns Lou Groza 19-yard field goal Cleve 10 – Phila 0

2nd

- Eagles Pete Pihos 15-yard pass from Bobby Thomason (Bobby Walston kick) Cleve 10 – Phila 7
- Eagles Bobby Thomason 1-yard rush (Bobby Walston kick) Cleve 10 – Phila 14
- Browns Lou Groza 24-yard field goal Cleve 13 – Phila 14

3rd

- Browns Ken Carpenter 8-yard pass from Otto Graham (Lou Groza kick) Cleve 20 – Phila 14
- Eagles Toy Ledbetter 14-yard pass from Bobby Thomason (Bobby Walston kick) Cleve 20 – Phila 21
- Eagles Don Johnson 2-yard rush (Bobby Walston kick) Cleve 20 – Phila 28

4th

- Eagles Toy Ledbetter 3-yard rush (Bobby Walston kick) Cleve 20 – Phila 35
- Eagles Bobby Walston 17-yard pass from Bobby Thomason (Bobby Walston kick) Cleve 20 – Phila 42
- Browns Dante Lavelli 17-yard pass from George Ratterman (Lou Groza kick) Cleve 27 – Phila 42

== Playoffs ==
With a record of 7–4–1 the Eagles finish behind Cleveland and fail to make the playoffs. The Detroit Lions won the National Division and played the Cleveland Browns in the 1953 NFL Championship Game.

(All time List of Philadelphia Eagles players in franchise history)

| = 1953 Pro Bowl | = Hall of Famer |

- + = Pro Bowl starter

| NO. | Player | AGE | POS | GP | GS | WT | HT | YRS | College |
|---|---|---|---|---|---|---|---|---|---|
| | Jim Trimble | 35 | COACH | _{1953 record} 7–3–1 | _{NFL-Eagles; Lifetime} 14–9–1 | | | 2nd | Indiana University |
| 60 | Chuck Bednarik + | 28 | C-LB | 12 | 0 | 233 | 6–3 | 4 | Pennsylvania |
| 36 | John Brewer | 25 | FB | 6 | 0 | 230 | 6–4 | 1 | Louisville |
| 45 | Tom Brookshier | 22 | DB | 11 | 0 | 196 | 6–0 | Rookie | Colorado |
| 10 | Adrian Burk | 26 | QB | 10 | 4 | 190 | 6–2 | 3 | Baylor |
| 33 | Russ Craft | 34 | DB-HB | 12 | 0 | 178 | 5–9 | 7 | Alabama |
| 53 | Ken Farragut | 25 | C-LB | 12 | 0 | 240 | 6–4 | 2 | Mississippi |
| 14 | Bob Gambold | 24 | QB | 3 | 0 | 215 | 6–4 | Rookie | Washington State |
| 27 | Hal Giancanelli | 24 | HB | 12 | 0 | 182 | 5–10 | Rookie | Loyola Marymount |
| 88 | Bob Hudson | 23 | DB-LB-E | 12 | 0 | 225 | 6–4 | 2 | Clemson |
| 81 | Willie Irvin | 23 | DE-E | 3 | 0 | 203 | 6–3 | Rookie | Florida A&M |
| 78 | Mike Jarmoluk | 31 | DT-T-MG | 12 | 0 | 232 | 6–5 | 7 | Temple |
| 40 | Don Johnson | 22 | HB | 12 | 0 | 187 | 6–0 | Rookie | California |
| 76 | Bucko Kilroy | 32 | G-MG-T-DT | 12 | 0 | 243 | 6–2 | 10 | Temple |
| 25 | Toy Ledbetter | 26 | HB | 10 | 0 | 198 | 5–10 | 3 | Oklahoma State |
| 67 | John Magee | 30 | G | 12 | 0 | 220 | 5–10 | 5 | _{La-Lafayette and Rice} |
| 61 | John Michels | 22 | G | 11 | 0 | 200 | 5–11 | Rookie | Tennessee |
| 72 | George Mrkonic | 24 | T-DT | 10 | 0 | 225 | 6–2 | Rookie | Kansas |
| 68 | Maury Nipp | 23 | G | 12 | 0 | 219 | 6–0 | 1 | Loyola Marymount |
| 43 | Jim Parmer | 27 | FB-HB | 12 | 0 | 193 | 6–0 | 5 | Oklahoma State |
| 35 | Pete Pihos + | 30 | E-DE | 12 | 0 | 210 | 6–1 | 6 | Indiana |
| 21 | Al Pollard | 25 | HB-FB | 12 | 0 | 196 | 6–0 | 2 | _{Army and Loyola Marymount} |
| 65 | Jess Richardson | 23 | DT | 12 | 0 | 261 | 6–2 | Rookie | Alabama |
| 52 | Wayne Robinson | 23 | LB-C | 11 | 0 | 225 | 6–2 | 1 | Minnesota |
| 85 | Bob Schnelker | 25 | E | 8 | 0 | 214 | 6–3 | Rookie | Bowling Green |
| 82 | Tom Scott | 23 | DE-LB | 12 | 0 | 218 | 6–2 | Rookie | Virginia |
| 79 | Vic Sears | 35 | T-DT | 12 | 0 | 223 | 6–3 | 12 | Oregon State |
| 73 | Lum Snyder | 23 | T | 12 | 0 | 228 | 6–5 | 1 | Georgia Tech |
| 44 | Bob Stringer | 24 | LB-FB | 12 | 0 | 197 | 6–1 | 1 | Tulsa |
| 11 | Bobby Thomason | 25 | QB | 12 | 8 | 196 | 6–1 | 4 | VMI |
| 31 | Ebert Van Buren | 29 | DB-LB-FB-HB | 12 | 0 | 210 | 6–2 | 2 | LSU |
| 83 | Bobby Walston | 25 | E-HB-K | 12 | 0 | 190 | 6–0 | 2 | Georgia |
| 86 | Norm Willey | 26 | DE-G-E | 12 | 0 | 224 | 6–2 | 3 | Marshall |
| 49 | Jerry Williams | 30 | DB-HB | 12 | 0 | 175 | 5–10 | 4 | _{Idaho and Washington State} |
| 75 | Frank Wydo | 29 | T-DT | 12 | 12 | 225 | 6–4 | 6 | Cornell |
| 41 | Frank Ziegler | 30 | HB-DB | 12 | 0 | 175 | 5–11 | 4 | Georgia Tech |
| | 35 Players; Team Average | | | 12 | | | | | |

- Jerry Williams will become head coach of Eagles for the 1969 season

== Postseason ==
Philadelphia finished second in last 2 seasons to the Cleveland Browns, with that Trimble is awarded a three-year contract after the team's second straight runner-up finish in 1953.

== Awards and honors ==
Pro Bowl

The Eagles placed 6 players on the 1953 Pro Bowl team. Chuck Bednarik is named MVP of the Pro Bowl.

Chuck Bednarik (Center – Linebacker)
Ken Farragut (Center – Linebacker)
Bucko Kilroy (Lineman)
Pete Pihos (End)
Lum Snyder (Tackle)
Bobby Thomason (Quarterback)

League leaders

Bobby Thomason finished 2nd in passing attempts and passing yards to George Blanda
Bobby Thomason finished 3rd in pass completions
Pete Pihos leads league in receptions, receiving yards and receiving TDs
Chuck Bednarik ties for lead in interceptions returned for TD
