= Sherman Howard (American football) =

American football player (1924–2019)

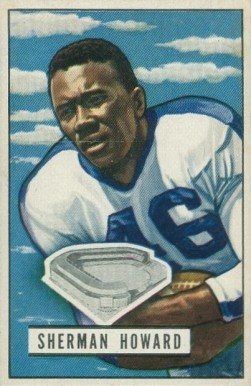
- Howard on a 1951 Bowman football card

No. 76, 46, 44, 30
- Positions: Halfback, defensive back

Personal information
- Born: November 28, 1924; New Orleans, Louisiana, U.S.
- Died: December 5, 2019 (aged 95); Richton Park, Illinois, U.S.
- Listed height: 5 ft 11 in (1.80 m)
- Listed weight: 193 lb (88 kg)

Career information
- High school: Wendell Phillips Academy (Chicago, Illinois)
- College: Iowa (1946); Nevada (1947–1948)
- NFL draft: 1949: undrafted

Career history
- New York Yankees (1949); New York Yanks (1950–1951); Cleveland Browns (1952–1953)

Career NFL/AAFC statistics
- Rushing yards: 1,301
- Rushing average: 4.0
- Receptions: 45
- Receiving yards: 968
- Total touchdowns: 22
- Stats at Pro Football Reference

Sherman John Howard (November 28, 1924 – December 5, 2019) was an American professional football player. He played professionally as a halfback for four seasons in the National Football League (NFL) with the New York Yanks and Cleveland Browns. At the time of his death, Howard was considered to be both the oldest living African American NFL player and the oldest living Cleveland Brown. Prior to his NFL career, Howard served in the U.S. Army during World War II. After his NFL career Howard was both a high school coach and teacher. Howard resided in a suburb of Chicago. He died in December 2019 at the age of 95.

== NFL/AAFC career statistics ==
Legend
	Led the league
**Bold**	Career high

=== Regular season ===
Year	Team	Games		Rushing					Receiving				
Year	Team	GP	GS	Att	Yds	Avg	Lng	TD	Rec	Yds	Avg	Lng	TD
1949	NYY	12	6	**117**	**459**	3.9	**79**	3	1	24	**24.0**	24	0
1950	NYY	12	0	71	362	5.1	60	3	12	278	23.2	40	**5**
1951	NYY	12	12	94	343	3.6	31	**4**	**21**	**447**	21.3	**75**	3
1952	CLE	5	4	34	95	2.8	22	0	11	219	19.9	57	3
1953	CLE	12	0	7	42	**6.0**	34	0	0	0	0.0	0	0
		53	22	323	1,301	4.0	79	10	45	968	21.5	75	11

=== Playoffs ===
Year	Team	Games		Rushing					Receiving				
Year	Team	GP	GS	Att	Yds	Avg	Lng	TD	Rec	Yds	Avg	Lng	TD
1949	NYY	1	0	**16**	**37**	**2.3**	-	**1**	0	0	0.0	0	0
1953	CLE	1	0	0	0	0.0	0	0	0	0	0.0	0	0
		2	0	16	37	2.3	-	1	0	0	0.0	0	0
