= 1953 New York Giants season =

NFL team season

- Owner: Tim Mara
- Head coach: Steve Owen
- Home stadium: Polo Grounds

Results
- Record: 3–9
- Division place: 5th NFL Eastern
- Playoffs: Did not qualify

The 1953 New York Giants season was the franchise's 29th season in the National Football League. The Giants were looking to improve on their 7–5 record from the previous season. However, the Giants hit rock bottom in 1953, losing their first three games of the season on their way to a disappointing 3–9 record and in 5th place in their division. The season included a 62–14 loss to the Cleveland Browns, the 62 points being the second most points surrendered in franchise history at the time as they had given up 63 points the year before in 1952 to the Pittsburgh Steelers, until it was surpassed by the 1966 team that gave up 72 points to Washington in the highest scoring game in NFL history.

Head coach Steve Owen was fired at the end of the season. After his departure, rumors emerged that future legendary coach Vince Lombardi was a candidate to replace him as the next head coach. However, the Giants ultimately settled on Jim Lee Howell as their next coach, while Lombardi was hired as co-offensive coordinator.

== Schedule ==
Game	Date	Opponent	Result	Record	Venue	Attendance	Recap	Sources
1	September 27	at Los Angeles Rams	**L** 7–21	0–1	Los Angeles Memorial Coliseum	49,579	Recap	
2	October 3	at **Pittsburgh Steelers**	**L** 14–24	0–2	Forbes Field	31,500	Recap	
3	October 11	at **Washington Redskins**	**L** 9–13	0–3	Griffith Stadium	26,241	Recap	
4	October 18	**Chicago Cardinals**	**W** 21–7	1–3	Polo Grounds	30,301	Recap	
5	October 25	**Cleveland Browns**	**L** 0–7	1–4	Polo Grounds	30,773	Recap	
6	November 1	at **Chicago Cardinals**	**W** 23–20	2–4	Comiskey Park	17,499	Recap	
7	November 8	at **Philadelphia Eagles**	**L** 7–30	2–5	Connie Mack Stadium	24,331	Recap	
8	November 15	**Pittsburgh Steelers**	**L** 10–14	2–6	Polo Grounds	20,411	Recap	
9	November 22	**Washington Redskins**	**L** 21–24	2–7	Polo Grounds	16,887	Recap	
10	November 29	**Philadelphia Eagles**	**W** 37–28	3–7	Polo Grounds	20,294	Recap	
11	December 6	at **Cleveland Browns**	**L** 14–62	3–8	Cleveland Municipal Stadium	40,235	Recap	
12	December 13	Detroit Lions	**L** 16–27	3–9	Polo Grounds	28,390	Recap	
Note: Intra-conference opponents are in **bold** text.

== Standings ==
NFL Eastern Conference
	W	L	T	PCT	CONF	PF	PA	STK
Cleveland Browns	11	1	0	.917	9–1	348	162	L1
Philadelphia Eagles	7	4	1	.636	6–3–1	352	215	W1
Washington Redskins	6	5	1	.545	6–3–1	208	215	L1
Pittsburgh Steelers	6	6	0	.500	5–5	211	263	W2
New York Giants	3	9	0	.250	3–7	179	277	L2
Chicago Cardinals	1	10	1	.091	0–10	190	337	W1

Note: Tie games were not officially counted in the standings until 1972.

== Roster ==
1953 New York Giants roster
Quarterbacks (QB): 42 Charlie Conerly; Running backs (RB): 34 Butch Avinger P; 12 Randy Clay CB/K; 24 Sonny Grandelius; 31 Eddie Price; 44 Kyle Rote; Wide receivers (WR): 82 Cliff Anderson; 80 Ray Pelfrey; 81 Bill Stribling; Tight ends (TE)	Offensive linemen (OL): 60 Bill Austin G; 79 Rosey Brown T; 78 Dewayne Douglas T; 67 George Kennard G; 65 Chet Lagod G; 53 John Rapacz C; 66 Jack Stroud G; 72 Dick Yelvington T; Defensive linemen (DL): 75 Bill Albright DG; 86 Jim Duncan DE; 70 Ray Krouse DT; 63 Bob Peviani DG; 61 Joe Ramona DG; 21 Joe Sulaitis DE; 73 Arnie Weinmeister DT; 51 Dick Woodard DE/DT/LB	Linebackers (LB): 52 John Cannady; 55 Ray Wietecha C; Defensive backs (DB): 16 Frank Gifford S/RB/K; 49 Tom Landry CB/P; 22 Buford Long CB/S/RB; 38 Don Menasco CB; 47 Leo Miles S/CB; 45 Emlen Tunnell S; Special teams (ST)	Reserve: -- Ray Beck G (Military); 17 Arnie Galiffa QB (IR); 35 Merwin Hodel RB (IR); -- Pat Knight LB (IR); -- Hal Mitchell T (Military); Rookies in italics

== New York Giants coaching vacancy ==
Before the end of the 1953 season, the New York Daily News had a headline in their paper that Vince Lombardi was the top candidate to become the Giants new head coach. Although Giants co-owner Wellington Mara was a classmate of Lombardi at Fordham University, the Giants were actually interested in Army head coach, Colonel Red Blaik. Blaik had declined the job, but recommended Lombardi, who was his offensive co-ordinator at Army. Despite being Red Blaik's top aide, Vince Lombardi was anxious and frustrated. Three other Army assistants, including Murray Warmath were now head coaches. In June, Lombardi had turned forty years old. Lombardi would be hired as the offensive co-ordinator for the 1954 season.

== See also ==
- List of New York Giants seasons
