= 1953 Chicago Cardinals season =

American football team season

- Head coach: Joe Stydahar
- Home stadium: Comiskey Park

Results
- Record: 1–10–1
- Division place: 6th NFL Eastern
- Playoffs: Did not qualify

The 1953 Chicago Cardinals season marked the 34th year the team was in the National Football League (NFL). The team failed to improve on their previous output of 4–8, winning only one game, the final game of the season. They thus failed to qualify for the playoffs for the fifth consecutive season.

== Schedule ==
| Week | Date | Opponent | Result | Record | Venue | Attendance |
|---|---|---|---|---|---|---|
| 1 | September 27 | **Washington Redskins** | **L** 13–24 | 0–1 | Comiskey Park | 16,055 |
| 2 | October 4 | **Cleveland Browns** | **L** 7–27 | 0–2 | Comiskey Park | 24,374 |
| 3 | October 11 | at **Pittsburgh Steelers** | **L** 28–31 | 0–3 | Forbes Field | 25,935 |
| 4 | October 18 | at **New York Giants** | **L** 7–21 | 0–4 | Polo Grounds | 30,301 |
| 5 | October 25 | **Philadelphia Eagles** | **L** 17–56 | 0–5 | Comiskey Park | 22,064 |
| 6 | November 1 | **New York Giants** | **L** 20–23 | 0–6 | Comiskey Park | 17,499 |
| 7 | November 8 | at **Washington Redskins** | **L** 17–28 | 0–7 | Griffith Stadium | 19,654 |
| 8 | November 15 | Los Angeles Rams | **T** 24–24 | 0–7–1 | Comiskey Park | 26,674 |
| 9 | November 21 | at **Philadelphia Eagles** | **L** 0–38 | 0–8–1 | Connie Mack Stadium | 19,402 |
| 10 | November 29 | at **Cleveland Browns** | **L** 16–27 | 0–9–1 | Cleveland Municipal Stadium | 24,499 |
| 11 | December 6 | **Pittsburgh Steelers** | **L** 17–21 | 0–10–1 | Comiskey Park | 14,138 |
| 12 | December 13 | at Chicago Bears | **W** 24–17 | 1–10–1 | Wrigley Field | 38,059 |
Note: Intra-conference opponents are in **bold** text.

== Standings ==
NFL Eastern Conference
| | W | L | T | PCT | CONF | PF | PA | STK |
|---|---|---|---|---|---|---|---|---|
| Cleveland Browns | 11 | 1 | 0 | .917 | 9–1 | 348 | 162 | L1 |
| Philadelphia Eagles | 7 | 4 | 1 | .636 | 6–3–1 | 352 | 215 | W1 |
| Washington Redskins | 6 | 5 | 1 | .545 | 6–3–1 | 208 | 215 | L1 |
| Pittsburgh Steelers | 6 | 6 | 0 | .500 | 5–5 | 211 | 263 | W2 |
| New York Giants | 3 | 9 | 0 | .250 | 3–7 | 179 | 277 | L2 |
| Chicago Cardinals | 1 | 10 | 1 | .091 | 0–10 | 190 | 337 | W1 |

Note: Tie games were not officially counted in the standings until 1972.

== Personnel ==
=== Staff / Coaches ===
1953 Chicago Cardinals staff
| Front office: Principal Owner - Violet Bidwill Wolfner; Managing Director - Walter Wolfner; Head coaches: Head Coach – Joe Stydahar; Assistant Coach - Mike Nixon; Offensive coaches: Backfield Coach - Skip Stahley; Ends Coach - Dick Gallagher; Line Coach - Ernie Jorge | Defensive coaches: Defensive Line Coach - Ernie Jorge |

=== Roster ===
Official team photo of the 1953 Chicago Cardinals.

1953 Chicago Cardinals roster
| Quarterbacks (QB): 12 Steve Romanik; 9 Jim Root; Running backs (RB): 47 Al Campana CB; 20 Billy Cross; 33 Johnny Olszewski; 37 Jack Spinks; 2 Charley Trippi P; Wide receivers (WR): 84 Gern Nagler; 80 Don Stonesifer; Tight ends (TE) | Offensive linemen (OL): 72 Bill Fischer G/T; 73 Tom Higgins T/DE; 66 Ed Husmann G; 70 Jack Jennings T; 50 Jack Simmons C/P; 61 Dave Suminski G; 64 Jerry Watford G; Defensive linemen (DL): 82 Tom Bienemann DE; 68 Nick Chickillo MG; 78 George Gilchrist DT/MG; 57 Jerry Groom DT; 71 Don Joyce DT/MG; 76 Volney Peters DT; 81 George Schmidt DE; 83 Pat Summerall DE/K | Linebackers (LB): 39 Tony Curcillo MLB/FB; 34 John Panelli MLB; 51 Leo Sanford OLB; 31 Bill Svoboda OLB; Defensive backs (DB): 49 Roy Barni CB; 41 Willie Carter S; 22 Don Paul CB/RB; 24 Jim Psaltis S; 87 Ray Ramsey CB/WR; Special teams (ST) | Reserve: -- Ogden Compton QB (Military); -- Ed Listopad G (Military); -- Ollie Matson RB (Military); 36 Ralph Pasquariello RB (IR); -- Leo Sugar DE (Military); -- Ralph Thomas DE (Military); -- Fred Wallner G/LB (Military); Rookies in italics |
