= Willie Irvin =

American football player (1930–2026)

No. 81
- Positions: Defensive end, end

Personal information
- Born: January 3, 1930; St. Augustine, Florida, U.S.
- Died: March 21, 2026 (aged 96); West Palm Beach, Florida, U.S.
- Listed height: 6 ft 3 in (1.91 m)
- Listed weight: 203 lb (92 kg)

Career information
- College: Florida A&M
- NFL draft: 1953: 15th round, 179th overall pick

Career history
- Philadelphia Eagles (1953)

Career NFL statistics
- Fumble recoveries: 1
- Stats at Pro Football Reference

Willie James Irvin (January 3, 1930 – March 21, 2026) was an American professional football player who was a defensive back in the National Football League (NFL) for the Philadelphia Eagles. He played college football for the Florida A&M Rattlers.

== Biography ==
Prior to the NFL, in 1949 Willie Irvin attended Florida A&M University (then known as Florida A & M College) on a football scholarship where he was coached by the legendary Jake "The Snake" Gaither, one of the most winning coaches in the history of college football.

Coach Gaither was known for not playing freshmen, however, during his freshman year Willie Irvin was sent into a game to replace an injured end by Assistant Coach Hansel "Tootie" Tookes. Known by the nickname "Big Train", on his first play, Willie Irvin made an interception, ran 55 yards to score a touchdown and was a starter for that time on. In 1995, Wilie Irvin was inducted into FAMU's Sports Hall of Fame for football.

Although he attended FAMU on a football scholarship, Willie Irvin also played on the basketball team. He and three teammates Thomas "Butch" Hogan, Charles "Trick Shot" White, and John "Turk" Culyer made FAMU history by defeating Alabama State in the 1952 Southern Intercollegiate Athletic Conference (SIAC) Tournament. Due to FAMU players having fouled out, Willie Irvin (who had four personal fouls himself) and his three teammates played for more than 13 minutes with only four men on the court. After playing into double overtime, the four-man team defeated Alabama State 71–67. Willie Irvin and his three teammates were inducted into FAMU's Sports Hall of Fame in 2001 as the "Famed Final Four of 1952," at which time Jake Gaither stated that "this was the greatest display of determination by any Rattlers squad."

For his athletic achievements, Willie Irvin was also inducted into the Palm Beach County, Florida Sports Hall of Fame.

Upon graduating from FAMU in 1953, Willie Irvin was selected by the Philadelphia Eagles where he played as a defensive back until he was drafted by the Army.

After being honorably discharged from the Army, Willie Irvin got his master's degree and became a coach, teacher and eventually a career school administrator at Twin Lakes High School, later retiring from the school system after 34 years.

Irvin died in West Palm Beach on March 21, 2026, at the age of 96.
