= Jim Brandt =

American football player (born 1929)

No. 27, 84
- Position: Defensive back / Halfback

Personal information
- Born: May 19, 1929; Fargo, North Dakota, U.S.
- Died: November 18, 2020 (aged 91); Rochester, Minnesota, U.S.
- Listed height: 6 ft 1 in (1.85 m)
- Listed weight: 205 lb (93 kg)

Career information
- High school: Bold (Olivia, Minnesota)
- College: St. Thomas (1947–1950)
- NFL draft: 1951: 12th round, 140th overall pick

Career history
- Pittsburgh Steelers (1952–1954); Montreal Alouettes (1955)

Career NFL statistics
- Rushing yards: 188
- Rushing average: 3.1
- Receptions: 3
- Receiving yards: 24
- Total touchdowns: 4
- Stats at Pro Football Reference

James Richard "Popcorn" Brandt (May 19, 1929 – November 18, 2020) was an American professional football player who played three seasons with the Pittsburgh Steelers of the National Football League (NFL). He was selected by the Steelers in the 12th round of the 1951 NFL draft. He played college football at the College of St. Thomas. He was also a member of the Montreal Alouettes of the Western Interprovincial Football Union.

== Early life and college ==
James Richard Brandt was born on May 19, 1929, in Fargo, North Dakota. He attended Bold High School in Olivia, Minnesota.

Brandt was a member of the St. Thomas Tommies of the College of St. Thomas from 1947 to 1950. He was on the freshmam football team in 1947 and the main roster from 1948 to 1950. He graduated with a Bachelor of Arts in 1951. Brandt was inducted into the St. Thomas Athletics Hall of Fame as part of the first class in 1974.

== Professional career ==
Brandt was selected by the Pittsburgh Steelers in the 12th round, with the 140th overall pick, of the 1951 NFL draft. After spending a year in the United States Army, he signed with the Steelers on April 26, 1952. He played in nine games, starting one, for the Steelers during the 1952 season, recording one kick return for 24 yards. Brandt appeared in all 12 games, starting nine, in 1953, totaling 42 carries for 106 yards and three touchdowns, two catches for 15 yards, six kick returns for 135 yards, and six punt returns for 34 yards. The Steelers finished the year with a 6–6 record. He played in all 12 games again in 1954, rushing 19 times for 82 yards and one touchdown while also catching one pass for nine yards. Brandt became a free agent after the season and re-signed with the Steelers on June 6, 1955. He was released on September 20, 1955.

Brandt played in one game for the Montreal Alouettes of the Western Interprovincial Football Union in 1955, rushing nine times for 37 yards.

== Personal life ==
Brandt died on November 28, 2020 in Rochester, Minnesota.
