= Tommy James (American football) =

American football player (1923–2007)

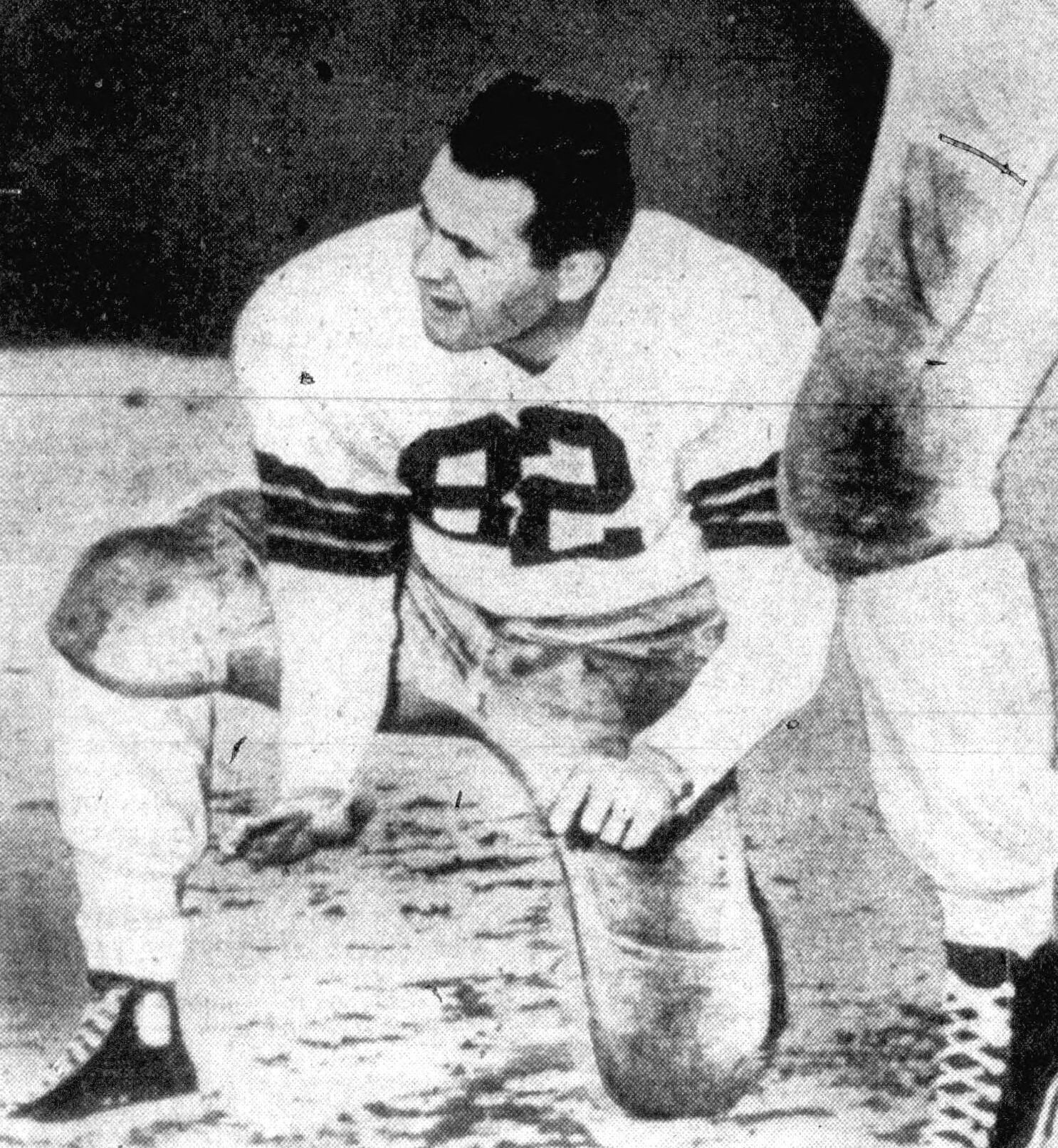
- James in 1950

No. 22, 82, 42, 20
- Positions: Defensive back, Punter

Personal information
- Born: September 16, 1923; Canton, Ohio, U.S.
- Died: February 7, 2007 (aged 83); Massillon, Ohio, U.S.
- Listed height: 5 ft 10 in (1.78 m)
- Listed weight: 185 lb (84 kg)

Career information
- High school: Massillon Washington
- College: Ohio State (1942, 1946)
- NFL draft: 1947: 17th round, 146th overall pick

Career history
- Detroit Lions (1947); Cleveland Browns (1948-1955); Baltimore Colts (1956)

Awards and highlights
- 2× AAFC champion (1948, 1949); 3× NFL champion (1950, 1954, 1955); Second-team All-Pro (1954); Pro Bowl (1953); Cleveland Browns Legends; National champion (1942)

Career NFL/AAFC statistics
- Interceptions: 34
- Fumble recoveries: 5
- Total touchdowns: 2
- Stats at Pro Football Reference

Thomas Laverne James Jr. (September 16, 1923 – February 7, 2007) was an American professional football player who was a defensive back and punter in the National Football League (NFL) and All-America Football Conference (AAFC) from 1947 to 1956, primarily for the Cleveland Browns. He was born in Canton, Ohio, and attended Massillon Washington High School, where he played as a back on the football team under head coach Paul Brown. James was a key part of a Massillon team that went undefeated in 1940. After graduating, he followed Brown to play college football for the Ohio State Buckeyes and played there as a halfback. Ohio State won its first national championship in 1942 when James was on the team.

After a three-year stint in the U.S. Army during World War II, James returned to play a final season at Ohio State in 1946. He then signed with the Detroit Lions of the NFL, where he stayed for a year before rejoining Brown, who had become head coach of the Cleveland Browns in the AAFC. James spent eight seasons in Cleveland, playing as a defensive halfback on five championship teams, including two in the AAFC in the late 1940s and three in the NFL in the 1950s. He left football after playing briefly for the Baltimore Colts in 1956. Later in life, he worked as a salesman at a trucking company. He died in 2007.

== High school and college ==
James grew up in Genoa, a small community in between Canton, Ohio, and Massillon, Ohio. The oldest of five children, one of his younger brothers included Don James, a Hall of Fame coach for Kent State and the University of Washington. He attended grammar school there through the eighth grade, but the town did not have a high school and students could choose to attend either Massillon Washington High School or the rival Canton McKinley High School. James at first decided to attend Canton, but Bud Houghton, an assistant coach of Massillon's football team, saw him playing in an informal scrimmage on a street corner and convinced him to come to Massillon. He played football there for three years under head coach Paul Brown. Playing as a back, James was part of a Massillon team that went undefeated in 1940. He scored a touchdown in a 28–0 victory over Toledo's Waite High School, the biggest game of the year; Massillon came into the matchup having won 30 games in a row, while Waite had won 18 straight.

James attended Ohio State University starting in 1941, the same year Brown was hired as the school's head football coach. He played on the freshman team in his first year, moving to the varsity team in 1942. Ohio State finished the season with a 9–1 win–loss record and won its first-ever college football national championship. James, who played as a halfback, was injured in a late-season game against the University of Illinois. This caused him to miss Ohio State's annual game against arch-rival Michigan, but he returned for the final game of the season against Iowa Pre-Flight, a military squad. James ran for a 54-yard touchdown on that game's first play and later added a punt return for a touchdown as Ohio State won 41–12.

James enlisted in the U.S. Army in 1943 and served for three years during World War II. He returned to Ohio State in 1946 and played on the varsity team again. The Buckeyes finished with a 4–3–2 record under coach Paul Bixler.

== Professional career ==
James signed with the National Football League's (NFL) Detroit Lions in 1947. He was still eligible to play in college at the time, but wartime rules allowed him to skip to the professional ranks and play for the Lions, who had selected him in the 1947 NFL draft. James broke his arm in the second game of the season, and he sat on the sidelines for the rest of the year. Detroit did not renew his contract, and the Cleveland Browns of the All-America Football Conference (AAFC), a team coached by Paul Brown, picked him up. He started at right defensive halfback in 1948 opposite Tommy Colella and intercepted four passes as the Browns went 15–0 and won the All-America Football Conference championship. Brown was pleasantly surprised by his abilities on defense. "Tommy always was a pretty good man on defense at Massillon and Ohio State", he said in 1948. "But his play this year has even surprised those of us who knew him in high school and college. I think we're definitely improved at defensive right half over last year."

James continued to be a key defensive player for the Browns in 1949, when the team won another AAFC championship behind a staunch defense and an offense led by quarterback Otto Graham and fullback Marion Motley. The AAFC dissolved after the season, however, and the Browns moved to the NFL. Cleveland's first year in the NFL was the best of James's career: he intercepted nine passes, setting a club record that stood until 1978. The team finished the season with a 10–2 record and beat the Los Angeles Rams to win the NFL championship. James made an interception in the game. He also held the ball for placekicker Lou Groza on the game-winning field goal with under a minute to play.

Cleveland reached the championship in each of the ensuing three years, but lost each time, once to the Rams and twice to the Detroit Lions. James intercepted five passes and recovered two fumbles in 1953 and was selected for the Pro Bowl, the NFL's annual all-star game. The Browns went on to win the NFL championship again in 1954 and 1955. James was moved from defensive halfback to safety in 1955 later in his career and was hampered by injuries.

Brown released the 33-year-old James on waivers before the 1956 season, which allowed other teams to pick up his contract. Brown said it was "one of the toughest things I've had to do in football" because of the effort James put out. James had worked in the offseason as a sporting goods salesman and had an offer to join a trucking firm, but said he wanted to continue his football career for one more year. He was picked up by the Baltimore Colts but left the team in October after injuring his shoulder. He ended his NFL career with 34 interceptions, all with the Browns, tying him for eighth place in team history.

== Later life and death ==
After his football career, James worked in the trucking business as a salesman, retiring at age 69. He had three sons, Tom, who resides in Michigan, Robert, who also went into the trucking business, and Mike who became the head track coach at Massillon Washington. James died in 2007 of congestive heart failure.
