= Don Steinbrunner =

American football player (1932–1967)

- Born: April 5, 1932; Bellingham, Washington, U.S.
- Died: July 20, 1967 (aged 35) near Quang Ngai City, Kon Tum Province, South Vietnam
- Military career
- Allegiance: United States
- Branch: U.S. Air Force
- Service years: 1954–1967
- Rank: Major
- Conflicts: Vietnam War †
- Awards: Distinguished Flying Cross; Purple Heart
- Football career

No. 56
- Position: Tackle

Personal information
- Listed height: 6 ft 3 in (1.91 m)
- Listed weight: 220 lb (100 kg)

Career information
- High school: Mount Baker Senior High
- College: Washington State
- NFL draft: 1953: 6th round, 71st overall pick

Career history
- Cleveland Browns (1953)

Awards and highlights
- First-team All-PCC (1951)
- Stats at Pro Football Reference

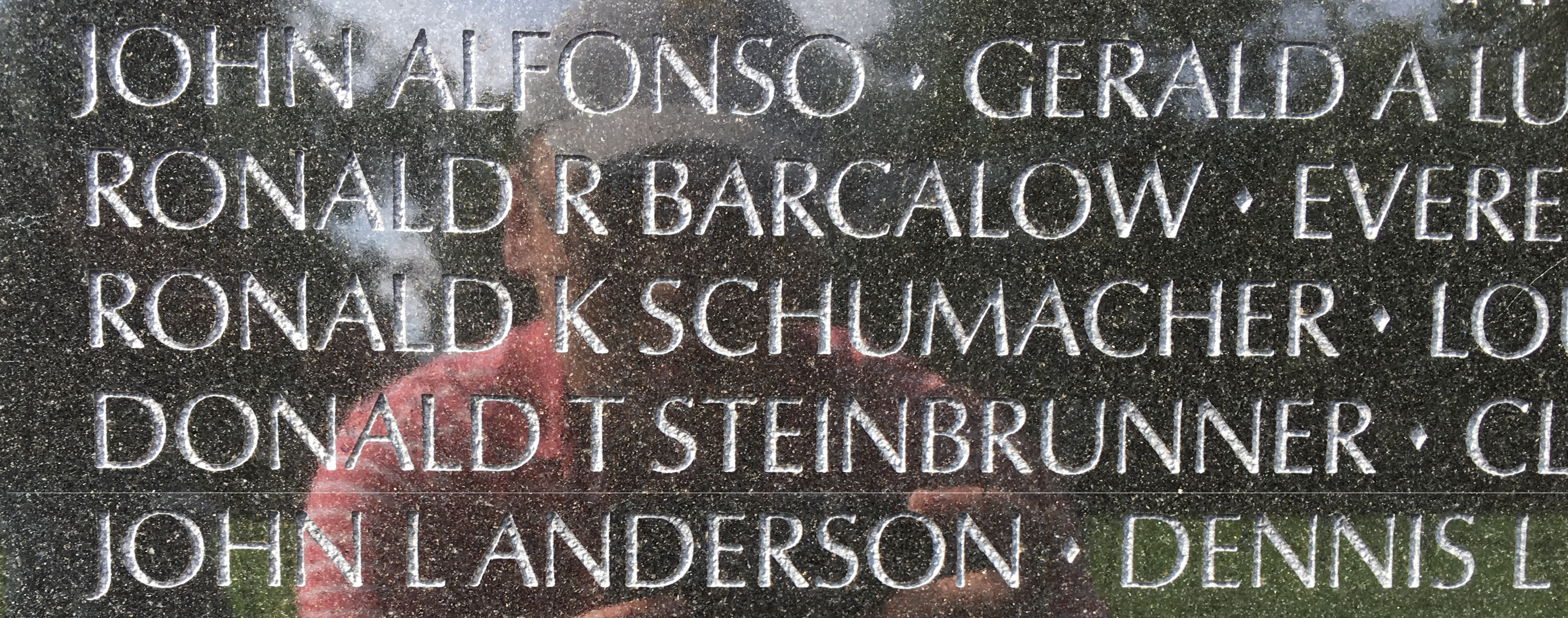
Steinbrunner's name (fourth row) on the Vietnam Veterans Memorial

Donald Thomas Steinbrunner (April 5, 1932 – July 20, 1967) was an American football offensive tackle who was one of only two American professional football players to die in the Vietnam War.

== Early life ==
Born in Bellingham, Washington, Steinbrunner was an all-state athlete in football and basketball at Mount Baker High School, and graduated in 1949. He played both sports at Washington State College in Pullman, and was the captain of both teams. He was also a member of ROTC in college.

== NFL career ==
Steinbrunner was selected in the sixth round of the 1953 NFL draft by the Cleveland Browns. He was an offensive tackle with the Browns in 1953, initially cut in training camp but brought back after the fourth game, and the Browns won the Eastern Conference with an 11–1 regular season record. Steinbrunner played in the 1953 NFL Championship Game at Briggs Stadium in Detroit, but the Browns lost 17–16 to the Lions.

== Military service ==
Steinbrunner left his professional football career in 1954 after only eight regular season games to fulfill his military requirement. With a lingering knee injury from his collegiate days and the Browns winning consecutive NFL titles in 1954 and 1955, he later opted to stay in the service. He joined the U.S. Air Force, first in the air police and later as a navigator, and in between was an assistant football coach for four seasons at the U.S. Air Force Academy in Colorado Springs.

Steinbrunner was sent to Vietnam in 1966, and after an injury was offered a safer assignment, which he refused. Major Steinbrunner's plane, a C-123 Provider, was shot down by small-arms fire on July 20, 1967, during a defoliation mission spraying Agent Orange on the jungle forest canopy, killing all five crewmen aboard. He was posthumously awarded a Purple Heart and the Distinguished Flying Cross.

Long unrecognized as the first NFL player to be killed in action in the Vietnam War, Steinbrunner was honored by the Browns on November 14, 2004. Buffalo Bills' guard Bob Kalsu, a first lieutenant in the U.S. Army with the 101st Airborne Division, was killed in action on July 21, 1970.

== See also ==
- Elmer Gedeon and Harry O'Neill – the two Major League Baseball players killed in World War II.
- Pat Tillman – NFL player killed in Afghanistan in 2004.
- Tim James – Basketball player who left his professional sports career and enlisted in the United States Army on September 12, 2008.
