= Nick Bolkovac =

American football player (1928–2015)

No. 75
- Positions: Defensive tackle, offensive tackle

Personal information
- Born: March 20, 1928; McKees Rocks, Pennsylvania, U.S.
- Died: October 29, 2015 (aged 87); Youngstown, Ohio, U.S.
- Listed height: 6 ft 1 in (1.85 m)
- Listed weight: 230 lb (104 kg)

Career information
- High school: Woodrow Wilson (Youngstown)
- College: Pittsburgh (1947–1950)
- NFL draft: 1951: 30th round, 354th overall pick

Career history
- Pittsburgh Steelers (1953–1954)

Awards and highlights
- Second-team All-American (1948); Second-team All-Eastern (1950)

Career NFL statistics
- Field goals made: 7
- Field goal attempts: 16
- Field goal %: 43.8
- Fumble recoveries: 1
- Total touchdowns: 1
- Stats at Pro Football Reference

Nicholas Frank Bolkovac (March 20, 1928 – October 29, 2015) was an American professional football offensive and defensive tackle in the National Football League (NFL) for the Pittsburgh Steelers. He played college football at the University of Pittsburgh and was drafted in the 30th round of the 1951 NFL draft by the Washington Redskins. He founded the "Pitt Rocks", an alumni organization for Pitt football players who played between 1940 and 1960. He died from "lung complications" in 2015.
