= 1954 Pro Bowl =

National Football League all-star game

1954 East–West Pro Bowl
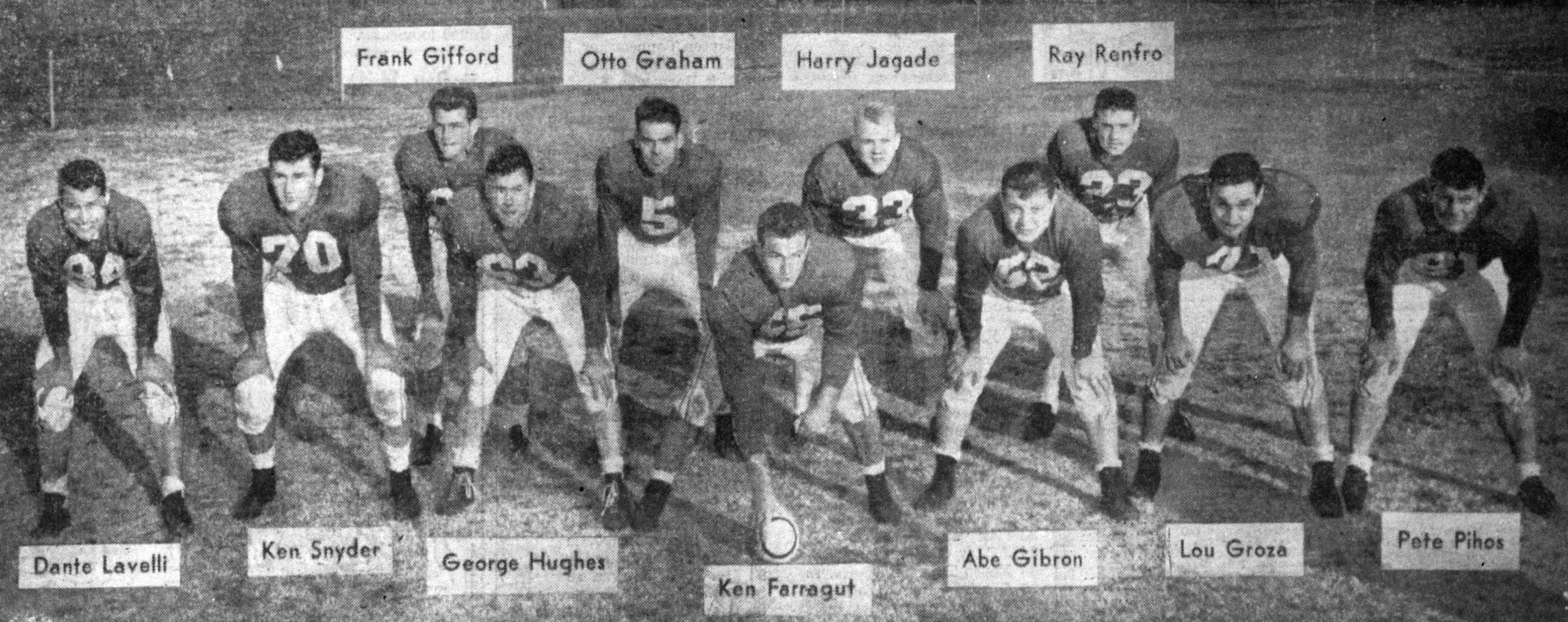
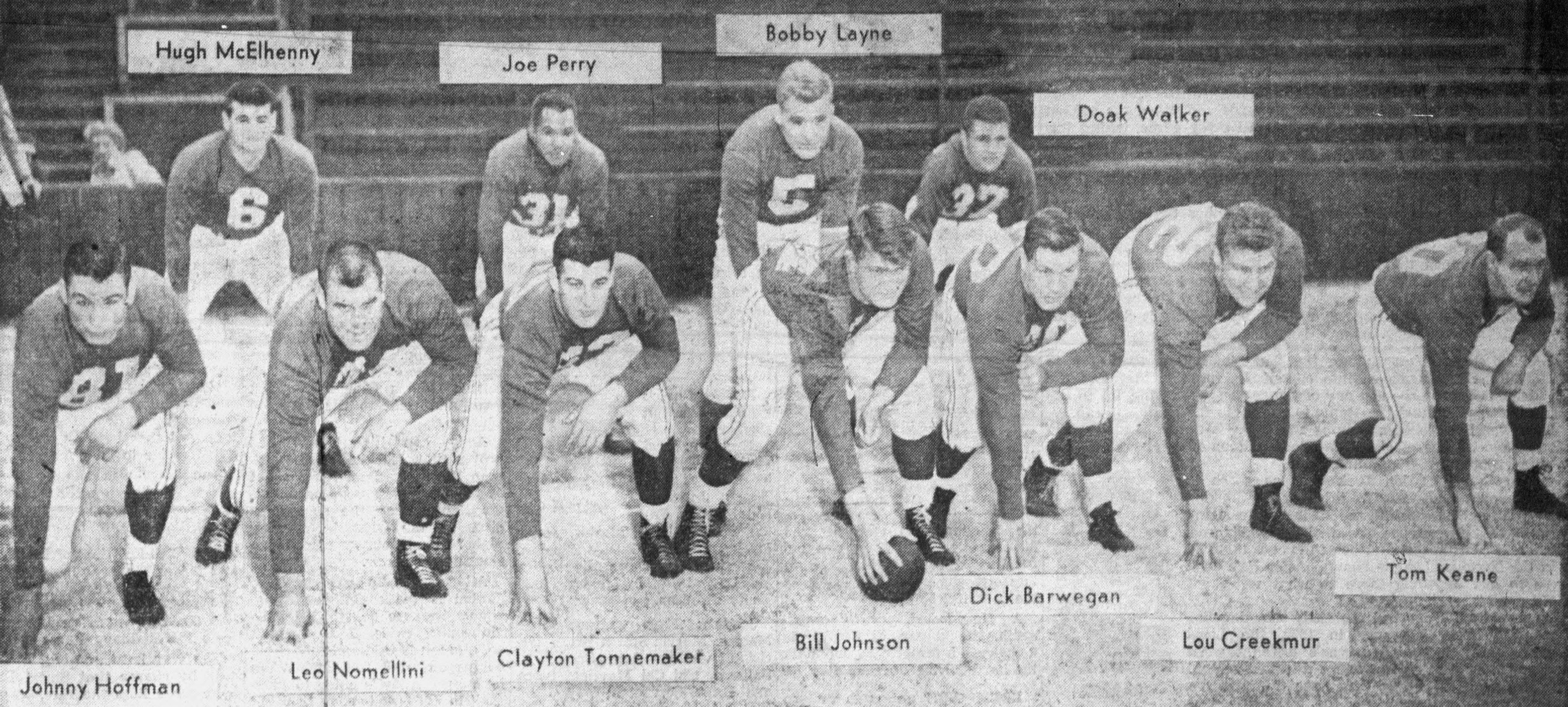
- Eastern Conference Pro Bowl team (top); Western Conference Pro Bowl team (bottom)
Eastern Conference	Western Conference
20	9
Head coach: Paul Brown (Cleveland Browns)	Head coach: Buddy Parker (Detroit Lions)
	1	2	3	4	Total
Eastern Conference	3	0	10	7	20
Western Conference	0	2	0	7	9
- Date: January 17, 1954
- Stadium: Memorial Coliseum; Los Angeles, California
- MVP: Chuck Bednarik (Philadelphia Eagles)
- Attendance: 44,214

TV in the United States
- Network: DuMont
- Announcers: Tom Harmon, Red Grange

The 1954 Pro Bowl was the National Football League's (NFL) fourth annual all-star game which featured the league's outstanding performers from the 1953 season. The game was played on January 17, 1954, at the Los Angeles Memorial Coliseum in Los Angeles, California in front of 44,214 fans. The East squad defeated the West by a score of 20–9.

The West team was led by the Detroit Lions' Buddy Parker while Paul Brown of the Cleveland Browns coached the East squad. Philadelphia Eagles linebacker Chuck Bednarik was named the game's outstanding player.
