= 1950 NFL draft =

National Football League draft

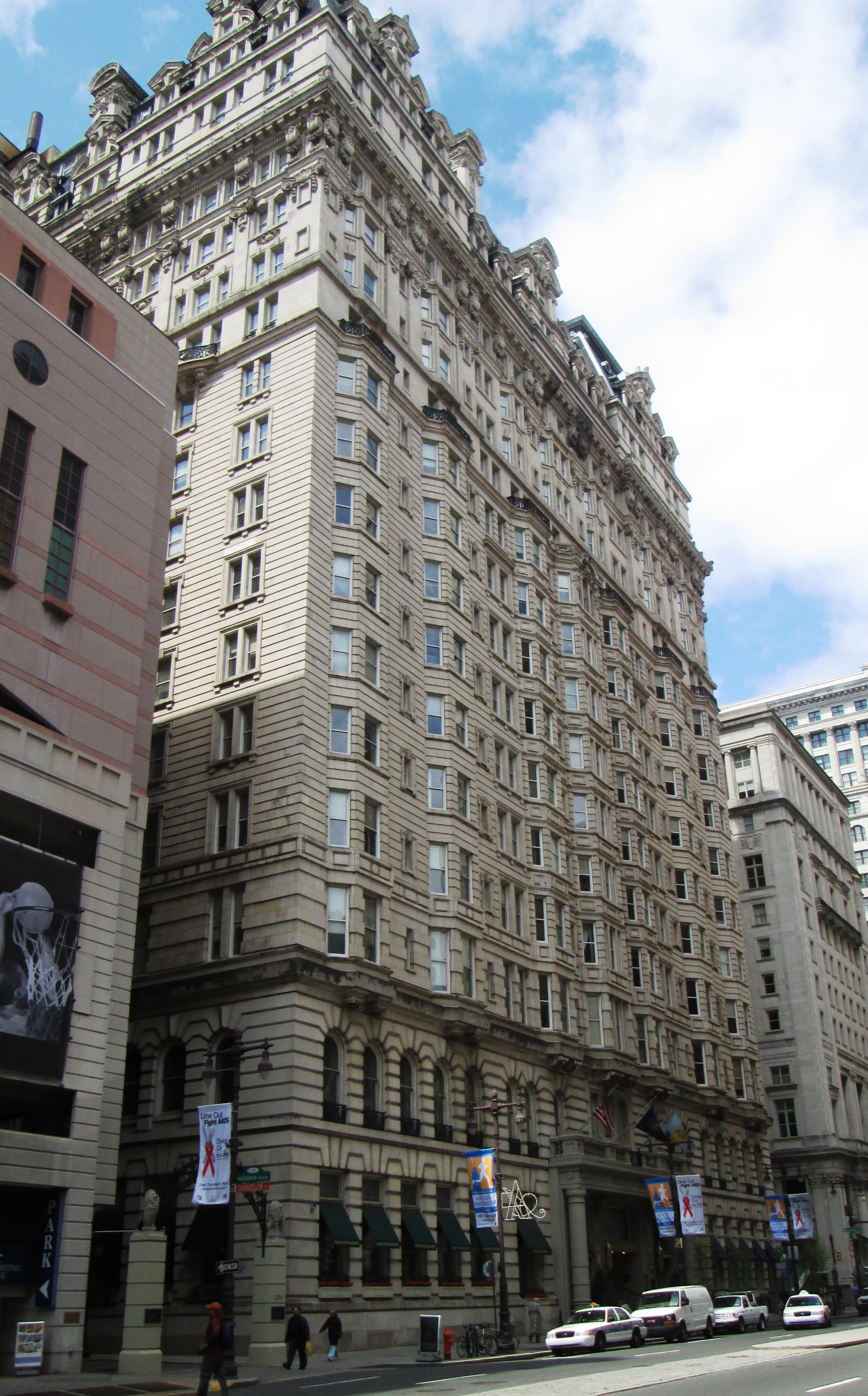
- The Bellevue–Stratford (location of the draft), photographed in 2013

General information
- Date: January 20–21, 1950
- Location: The Bellevue-Stratford Hotel in Philadelphia, Pennsylvania

Overview
- 391 total selections in 30 rounds
- League: NFL
- First selection: Leon Hart, E Detroit Lions
- Most selections (34): Chicago Bears
- Fewest selections (27): New York Giants
- Hall of Famers: 5: OT Leo Nomellini; WR Bud Grant; DT Ernie Stautner; OT Lou Creekmur; DT Art Donovan

The 1950 NFL draft was held January 20–21, 1950, at the Bellevue-Stratford Hotel in Philadelphia. With the league absorbing the Baltimore Colts, Cleveland Browns, and San Francisco 49ers from the All-America Football Conference, these three teams were combined with the other NFL clubs in a single ranking to determine the order of the draft.

This was the fourth year that the first overall pick was a bonus pick determined by lottery, with the previous three winners (Chicago Bears in 1947, Washington Redskins in 1948, and Philadelphia Eagles in 1949) ineligible from the draw; it was won by the Detroit Lions, who selected end Leon Hart.

== Player selections ==
†	=Pro Bowler (Note: Players are identified as Pro Bowlers if they were selected for the Pro Bowl at any time in their career.)
‡	=Hall of Famer (Note: Players are identified as a Hall of Famer if they have been inducted into the Pro Football Hall of Fame.)

Positions key
B	Back	BB	Blocking back	C	Center
E	End	FB	Fullback	G	Guard
OT	Offensive tackle	TB	Tailback	WB	Wingback

Rnd.	Pick	Team	Player	Pos.	College	Notes
1	1	Detroit Lions	Leon Hart ^{†}	E	Notre Dame	Bonus lottery pick;
1	2	Baltimore Colts	Adrian Burk ^{†}	QB	Baylor	
1	3	Chicago Bears	Chuck Hunsinger	HB	Florida	From New York Bulldogs
1	4	Green Bay Packers	Clayton Tonnemaker ^{†}	C	Minnesota	
1	5	Detroit Lions	Joe Watson	C	Rice	
1	6	Washington Redskins	George Thomas	B	Oklahoma	
1	7	New York Giants	Travis Tidwell	B	Auburn	
1	8	Pittsburgh Steelers	Lynn Chandnois ^{†}	B	Michigan State	
1	9	Los Angeles Rams	Ralph Pasquariello	B	Villanova	From Chicago Cardinals
1	10	Chicago Bears	Fred Morrison ^{†}	B	Ohio State	
1	11	San Francisco 49ers	Leo Nomellini^{‡}^{†}	T	Minnesota	
1	12	Los Angeles Rams	Stan West ^{†}	G	Oklahoma	
1	13	Cleveland Browns	Ken Carpenter ^{†}	B	Oregon	
1	14	Philadelphia Eagles	Bud Grant^{‡}	E	Minnesota	
2	15	Baltimore Colts	Leon Campbell	B	Arkansas	
2	16	New York Bulldogs	Art Weiner	E	North Carolina	
2	17	Green Bay Packers	Tobin Rote ^{†}	QB	Rice	
2	18	Cleveland Browns	John Sandusky	T	Villanova	
2	19	Washington Redskins	Hall Haynes	B	Santa Clara	
2	20	New York Giants	Eddie Price ^{†}	B	Tulane	
2	21	Chicago Cardinals	Jack Jennings	T	Ohio State	
2	22	Pittsburgh Steelers	Ernie Stautner^{‡}^{†}	DT	Boston College	
2	23	San Francisco 49ers	Don Campora	T	Pacific	
2	24	Chicago Bears	Kayo Dottley ^{†}	B	Ole Miss	
2	25	Los Angeles Rams	Bob Fuchs	C	Missouri	
2	26	Cleveland Browns	Jim Martin ^{†}	E	Notre Dame	
2	27	Detroit Lions	Thurman "Fum" McGraw ^{†}	T	Colorado A&M	
3	28	Baltimore Colts	Don Colo ^{†}	T	Brown	
3	29	Chicago Cardinals	Bill Svoboda ^{†}	B	Tulane	
3	30	Green Bay Packers	Gordy Soltau ^{†}	E	Minnesota	
3	31	Detroit Lions	Art Murakowski	B	Northwestern	
3	32	Washington Redskins	Lou Karras	T	Purdue	
3	33	New York Giants	Randy Clay	B	Texas	
3	34	Pittsburgh Steelers	George Hughes ^{†}	G	William & Mary	
3	35	Chicago Cardinals	Fran Polsfoot ^{†}	E	Washington State	
3	36	Chicago Bears	Steve Romanik	B	Villanova	
3	37	San Francisco 49ers	Ray Collins ^{†}	T	LSU	
3	38	Los Angeles Rams	Don Murray	T	Penn State	
3	39	Cleveland Browns	Jimmy Joe Robinson	B	Pittsburgh	
3	40	Philadelphia Eagles	Bob Sanders	B	Oregon	
4	41	Baltimore Colts	Earl Murray	G	Purdue	
4	42	New York Bulldogs	Zollie Toth ^{†}	B	LSU	
4	43	Green Bay Packers	Larry Coutre	B	Notre Dame	
4	44	Detroit Lions	Ernie Kiely	G	Texas Western	
4	45	Washington Redskins	Harry Ulinski ^{†}	C	Kentucky	
4	46	New York Giants	Porter Payne	G	Georgia	
4	47	Chicago Cardinals	Don Paul ^{†}	B	Washington State	
4	48	Chicago Bears	Tom Novak	C	Nebraska	
4	49	San Francisco 49ers	Morris Bailey	E	TCU	
4	50	Chicago Bears	Dom Papaleo	G	Boston College	
4	51	Los Angeles Rams	Ben H. Procter	E	Texas	
4	52	Cleveland Browns	Red Wilson	C	Wisconsin	
4	53	Philadelphia Eagles	Bob McChesney	E	Hardin–Simmons	
5	54	Baltimore Colts	Jack Halliday	G	SMU	
5	55	New York Bulldogs	Mike Swistowicz	B	Notre Dame	
5	56	Pittsburgh Steelers	Tom Rowe	E	Dartmouth	
5	57	Detroit Lions	Hal Fitkin	B	Dartmouth	
5	58	Washington Redskins	Frank Spaniel	B	Notre Dame	
5	59	New York Giants	Forrest Griffith	B	Kansas	
5	60	Pittsburgh Steelers	Lou Allen	T	Duke	
5	61	Chicago Cardinals	Carl Kiilsgaard	T	Idaho	
5	62	Chicago Bears	Ernie Zalejski	B	Notre Dame	
5	63	San Francisco 49ers	Harry Kane	C	Pacific	
5	64	Los Angeles Rams	Dick McKissack	B	SMU	
5	65	Cleveland Browns	Don Phelps	B	Kentucky	
5	66	Philadelphia Eagles	Mike Kaysserian	B	Detroit	
6	67	Baltimore Colts	Herb Rich	B	Vanderbilt	
6	68	New York Bulldogs	Ben Aldridge	B	Oklahoma A&M	
6	69	Green Bay Packers	Jack Cloud	B	William & Mary	
6	70	Detroit Lions	Floyd Jaszewski	T	Minnesota	
6	71	Washington Redskins	Gene Pepper	G	Missouri	
6	72	Chicago Bears	Gaspar Perricone	B	Northwestern	
6	73	Chicago Cardinals	Warren Wood	G	Puget Sound	
6	74	Pittsburgh Steelers	Ed Mattson	B	Trinity (TX)	
6	75	San Francisco 49ers	Don Van Pool	E	Oklahoma A&M	
6	76	Chicago Bears	Wayne Hansen ^{†}	C	Texas Western	
6	77	Los Angeles Rams	Orville Langrell	T	Oklahoma City	
6	78	Cleveland Browns	Ken Gorgal	B	Purdue	
6	79	Philadelphia Eagles	Lloyd McDermott	T	Kentucky	
7	80	Baltimore Colts	Art Bok	B	Dayton	
7	81	New York Bulldogs	Don Narrell	T	TCU	
7	82	Green Bay Packers	Leon Manley	G	Oklahoma	
7	83	Detroit Lions	Bill Leverman	B	St. Edward's	
7	84	Washington Redskins	Jerry Houghton	T	Washington State	
7	85	Chicago Cardinals	Billy Gay	B	Notre Dame	
7	86	Pittsburgh Steelers	Truett Smith	B	Mississippi State	
7	87	Chicago Cardinals	Ed Bagdon	G	Michigan State	
7	88	Chicago Bears	Rollin Prather	E	Kansas State	
7	89	San Francisco 49ers	Lindy Berry	B	TCU	
7	90	Los Angeles Rams	Cliff Coggin	E	Mississippi Southern	
7	91	Cleveland Browns	Win Carter	E	Missouri	
7	92	Philadelphia Eagles	Mel Olix	B	Miami (OH)	

=== Round 8 ===
Pick #	NFL team	Player	Position	College
93	Baltimore Colts	Dick Harris	Center	Texas
94	New York Bulldogs	Jack Archer	Back	TCU
95	Green Bay Packers	Harry Szulborski	Back	Purdue
96	Detroit Lions	Ralph McAlister	Back	Minnesota
97	Washington Redskins	John Rohde	End	Pacific
98	New York Giants	Ebert Van Buren	Back	LSU
99	Chicago Cardinals	John Hock	Tackle	Santa Clara
100	Pittsburgh Steelers	Fran Rogel	Back	Penn State
101	San Francisco 49ers	Ellery Williams	End	Santa Clara
102	Chicago Bears	Sam Nevills	Tackle	Oregon
103	Los Angeles Rams	Woodley Lewis	Back	Oregon
104	Cleveland Browns	Russ Frizzell	Tackle	Tulsa
105	Philadelphia Eagles	Dick O'Hanlon	Tackle	Ohio State

=== Round 9 ===
Pick #	NFL team	Player	Position	College
106	Baltimore Colts	Bill Bass	Back	Arkansas
107	Chicago Bears	Floyd Reid	Back	Georgia
108	Green Bay Packers	Roger Wilson	End	South Carolina
109	Detroit Lions	Ed Wood	Guard	Detroit
110	Washington Redskins	Don Winslow	Tackle	Iowa
111	New York Giants	Vince Cisterna	End	Northern Arizona
112	Pittsburgh Steelers	Max Druen	Tackle	Tulane
113	Chicago Cardinals	Vito Ragazzo	End	William & Mary
114	Chicago Bears	Dick Braznell	Back	Missouri
115	San Francisco 49ers	Pete Zinach	Back	West Virginia
116	Los Angeles Rams	Les Cowan	End	McMurry
117	Cleveland Browns	Jim Duncan	End	Wake Forest
118	Philadelphia Eagles	Bobby Wilson	Back	Ole Miss

=== Round 10 ===
Pick #	NFL team	Player	Position	College
119	Baltimore Colts	Errol Fry	Guard	Texas
120	New York Bulldogs	Melvin Lyle	End	LSU
121	Green Bay Packers	Bob Mealey	Tackle	Minnesota
122	Detroit Lions	Roland Malcolm	Back	Gustavus Adolphus
123	Washington Redskins	Eddie LeBaron	Quarterback	Pacific
124	New York Giants	Bob Wilkinson	End	UCLA
125	Chicago Cardinals	Walt Grothaus	Center	Notre Dame
126	Chicago Cardinals	Milt Lavigne	Back	Southeastern Louisiana
127	San Francisco 49ers	Bob Celeri	Back	California
128	Chicago Bears	Al Wahl	Tackle	Michigan
129	Los Angeles Rams	Jay Van Noy	Back	Utah State
130	Cleveland Browns	Frank O'Pella	Back	William & Mary
131	Philadelphia Eagles	Ernie Johnson	Back	UCLA

=== Round 11 ===
Pick #	NFL team	Player	Position	College
132	Baltimore Colts	Joe Romanosky	Tackle	St. Bonaventure
133	New York Bulldogs	Roger McAuley	Guard	TCU
134	Green Bay Packers	Gene Lorendo	End	Georgia
135	Detroit Lions	Jack Wilson	Tackle	Ohio State
136	Washington Redskins	Dan Brown	End	Villanova
137	Los Angeles Rams	Jay Roundy	Back	USC
138	Pittsburgh Steelers	Charley Williams	End	Sam Houston State
139	Chicago Cardinals	J. D. Ison	End	Baylor
140	Chicago Bears	John Helwig	Guard	Notre Dame
141	San Francisco 49ers	Harley Dow	Tackle	San Jose State
142	Los Angeles Rams	Fred Stuvek	Guard	West Virginia
143	Cleveland Browns	Bob Plotz	Guard	Pittsburgh
144	Philadelphia Eagles	Bobby Lantrip	Back	Rice

=== Round 12 ===
Pick #	NFL team	Player	Position	College
145	Baltimore Colts	Bill Dey	Back	Dartmouth
146	New York Bulldogs	Andy Hillhouse	End	Texas A&M
147	Green Bay Packers	Andy Pavich	End	Denver
148	Detroit Lions	Bucky Walters	Tackle	Brown
149	Washington Redskins	Bill Chauncey	Back	Iowa State
150	New York Giants	Ray Wietecha	Center	Northwestern
151	Chicago Cardinals	Frank Wallheiser	End	Western Kentucky
152	Chicago Cardinals	Bob Sharpe	Guard	Davidson
153	San Francisco 49ers	Don Burke	Back	USC
154	Chicago Bears	Kenny Roof	Back	Oklahoma A&M
155	Los Angeles Rams	John Lunney	Guard	Arkansas
156	Cleveland Browns	Emerson Cole	Back	Toledo
157	Philadelphia Eagles	Frank Mahoney	End	Brown

=== Round 13 ===
Pick #	NFL team	Player	Position	College
158	Baltimore Colts	Ray Stone	End	Texas
159	New York Bulldogs	Jack Morton	Back	West Virginia
160	Green Bay Packers	Carlton Elliott	End	Virginia
161	Detroit Lions	Jim Ryan	Back	San Francisco
162	Washington Redskins	Clay Davis	Center	Oklahoma A&M
163	New York Giants	Joe Kelly	Center	Wisconsin
164	Pittsburgh Steelers	Negley Norton	Tackle	Penn State
165	Chicago Cardinals	Jerry Hennessy	End	Santa Clara
166	Chicago Bears	Frank Dempsey	Tackle	Florida
167	San Francisco 49ers	Bimbo Cecconi	Back	Pittsburgh
168	Los Angeles Rams	Tom Winbigler	Back	College of Idaho
169	Cleveland Browns	Rupe Wright	Guard	Baylor
170	Philadelphia Eagles	Norm Willey	Back	Marshall

=== Round 14 ===
Pick #	NFL team	Player	Position	College
171	Baltimore Colts	Mitch Smiarowski	Center	St. Bonaventure
172	New York Bulldogs	Ed Carmichael	Guard	Oregon State
173	Green Bay Packers	Fred Leon	Tackle	Nevada
174	Detroit Lions	Cliff Squires	Center	Nebraska Wesleyan
175	Washington Redskins	Lyle Button	Tackle	Illinois
176	New York Giants	Gene Fritz	Tackle	Minnesota
177	Chicago Cardinals	Dee Andros	Guard	Oklahoma
178	Pittsburgh Steelers	James W. Kynes	Center	Florida
179	San Francisco 49ers	Tom Payne	End	Santa Clara
180	Chicago Bears	Al Hover	Guard	LSU
181	Los Angeles Rams	Bill Trautwein	Tackle	Ohio State
182	Cleveland Browns	Packard Harrington	Center	St. Mary's (CA)
183	Philadelphia Eagles	Billy Hix	End	Arkansas

=== Round 15 ===
Pick #	NFL team	Player	Position	College
184	Baltimore Colts	Art Spinney	End	Boston College
185	New York Bulldogs	Norm Messeroll	Tackle	Tennessee
186	Green Bay Packers	Gene Huebern	Center	Baylor
187	Detroit Lions	Tom Worthington	Back	Northwestern
188	Washington Redskins	Alex Loyd	End	Oklahoma A&M
189	New York Giants	Bill Roberson	Tackle	Stephen F. Austin
190	Pittsburgh Steelers	Harry Russell	Back	San Jose State
191	Chicago Cardinals	Al Langford	Back	Howard Payne
192	Chicago Bears	Jimmy Glisson	Back	Tulane
193	San Francisco 49ers	Leo Crampsey	End	St. Bonaventure
194	Los Angeles Rams	Dave Stephenson	Center	West Virginia
195	Cleveland Browns	Ted Meland	Guard	Oregon
196	Philadelphia Eagles	Herb Carey	Back	Dartmouth

=== Round 16 ===
Pick #	NFL team	Player	Position	College
197	Baltimore Colts	Dave Fisher	Back	Southwestern Louisiana
198	New York Bulldogs	Bill Stetter	Center	Holy Cross
199	Green Bay Packers	Frank Kuzma	Back	Minnesota
200	Detroit Lions	Jerry Greiner	Center	Detroit
201	Washington Redskins	Charlie Justice	Back	North Carolina
202	New York Giants	Bob Jackson	Back	North Carolina A&T
203	Chicago Cardinals	Harry Bierman	End	Furman
204	Pittsburgh Steelers	Bernie Barkouskie	Guard	Pittsburgh
205	San Francisco 49ers	Charley Shaw	Guard	Oklahoma A&M
206	Chicago Bears	Ed Bradley	End	Wake Forest
207	Los Angeles Rams	Jim Maloney	End	Fordham
208	Cleveland Browns	Art King	Guard	Ball State
209	Philadelphia Eagles	Jim Marck	Tackle	Xavier

=== Round 17 ===
Pick #	NFL team	Player	Position	College
210	Baltimore Colts	Ralph Murphy	Guard	Rice
211	New York Bulldogs	Joe Dean Tidwell	Back	Hardin
212	Green Bay Packers	Hal Otterback	Guard	Wisconsin
213	Detroit Lions	Connie Callahan	Back	Morningside
214	Washington Redskins	Jim Cullom	Guard	California
215	New York Giants	Steve Hatfield	Back	Shippensburg
216	Pittsburgh Steelers	Al Bodine	Back	Georgia
217	Chicago Cardinals	Tom Palmer	Tackle	Wake Forest
218	Chicago Bears	Ray Janaszek	Back	Dayton
219	San Francisco 49ers	Cliff Van Meter	Back	Tulane
220	Los Angeles Rams	Harry Neugold	Tackle	RPI
221	Cleveland Browns	Hal McKinney	Guard	Missouri Valley
222	Philadelphia Eagles	Jerry Taylor	Center	Mississippi State

=== Round 18 ===
Pick #	NFL team	Player	Position	College
223	Baltimore Colts	Charley Schoolmaster	Center	Western Michigan
224	New York Bulldogs	Jim Champion	Tackle	Mississippi State
225	Green Bay Packers	Arnold Galiffa	Quarterback	Army
226	Detroit Lions	Don Stansauk	Tackle	Denver
227	Washington Redskins	Alvin Duke	Back	Arkansas
228	New York Giants	George Roman	Tackle	Western Reserve
229	Chicago Cardinals	Ray Espenan	End	Notre Dame
230	Pittsburgh Steelers	Kenneth Powell	End	North Carolina
231	San Francisco 49ers	Ralph Genito	Back	Kentucky
232	Chicago Bears	Rupert Andrews	Back	Stanford
233	Los Angeles Rams	Bobby Collier	Tackle	SMU
234	Cleveland Browns	Joe Travue	Back	Louisville
235	Philadelphia Eagles	Ed Tunnicliff	Back	Northwestern

=== Round 19 ===
Pick #	NFL team	Player	Position	College
236	Baltimore Colts	Bill Waddail	Back	Auburn
237	New York Bulldogs	Bob Griffin	Back	Baylor
238	Green Bay Packers	Earl Rowan	Tackle	Hardin–Simmons
239	Detroit Lions	Gus Cifelli	Tackle	Notre Dame
240	Washington Redskins	Ed White	End	Alabama
241	New York Giants	Fritz Barzilauskas	Guard	Yale
242	Pittsburgh Steelers	Frank Gaul	Tackle	Notre Dame
243	Chicago Cardinals	Loran Day	Back	Northwestern
244	Chicago Bears	Billy Bye	Back	Minnesota
245	San Francisco 49ers	Forest Klein	Guard	California
246	Los Angeles Rams	John Smith	End	Arizona
247	Cleveland Browns	Butch Songin	Quarterback	Boston College
248	Philadelphia Eagles	Darrell Robinson	End	Oregon

=== Round 20 ===
Pick #	NFL team	Player	Position	College
249	Baltimore Colts	Sheldon Dunlap	Guard	Cincinnati
250	New York Bulldogs	Darrell Royal	Back	Oklahoma
251	Green Bay Packers	Jim Howe	Back	Kentucky
252	Detroit Lions	Fred Davis	End	Maryland
253	Washington Redskins	George Bayer	Tackle	Washington
254	New York Giants	Joe Tangaro	Tackle	Utah
255	Chicago Cardinals	Webb Halbert	Back	Iowa State
256	Pittsburgh Steelers	Mike DeNoia	Back	Scranton
257	San Francisco 49ers	Jack Nix	End	USC
258	Chicago Bears	Tank Crawford	Guard	Ole Miss
259	Los Angeles Rams	Bill Young	Back	Hillsdale
260	Cleveland Browns	John Hackney	Guard	Murray State
261	Philadelphia Eagles	Merv Pregulman	Guard	Michigan

=== Round 21 ===
Pick #	NFL team	Player	Position	College
262	Baltimore Colts	Tom Phillips	Back	Baldwin Wallace
263	New York Bulldogs	Bud French	Back	Kansas
264	Green Bay Packers	Gene Evans	Back	Wisconsin
265	Detroit Lions	George Brewer	Back	Oklahoma
266	Washington Redskins	Casimir Witucki	Guard	Indiana
267	New York Giants	Bill Stribling	End	Ole Miss
268	Pittsburgh Steelers	Dick Tomlinson	Guard	Kansas
269	Chicago Cardinals	Howard Blumhardt	Back	South Dakota
270	Chicago Bears	Bob Angie	Back	Iowa State
271	San Francisco 49ers	Guerin Alker	Center	Loyola (CA)
272	Los Angeles Rams	Bill Klein	End	Hanover
273	Cleveland Browns	Leroy Vogts	Guard	Washington University
274	Philadelphia Eagles	Marv Cross	Back	Washington State

=== Round 22 ===
Pick #	NFL team	Player	Position	College
275	Baltimore Colts	Chip Armstrong	Center	Occidental
276	New York Bulldogs	R. V. Johnson	Tackle	St. Mary's (CA)
277	Green Bay Packers	Chuck Beatty	Center	Penn State
278	Detroit Lions	Jim Tate	Tackle	Purdue
279	Washington Redskins	John deLaurentis	Tackle	Waynesburg
280	New York Giants	Bob DeMoss	Back	Purdue
281	Chicago Cardinals	Jim Lipinski	Tackle	Fairmont State
282	Pittsburgh Steelers	Stan Burak	Back	George Washington
283	San Francisco 49ers	Billy Wilson	End	San Jose State
284	Chicago Bears	Jim Byler	Guard	NC State
285	Los Angeles Rams	Doug Barber	Back	Dakota Wesleyan
286	Cleveland Browns	Jim Dowling	Guard	Santa Clara
287	Philadelphia Eagles	Jim Hague	End	Ohio State

=== Round 23 ===
Pick #	NFL team	Player	Position	College
288	Baltimore Colts	Harry Weittlaufer	End	Penn
289	New York Bulldogs	Dick Sheffield	End	Tulane
290	Green Bay Packers	George Mattey	Guard	Ohio State
291	Detroit Lions	Irv Heller	Tackle	Boston University
292	Washington Redskins	Joe Zuravleff	End	Northwestern
293	New York Giants	Warren Davis	Center	Colgate
294	Pittsburgh Steelers	Walt Kerulis	End	Illinois
295	Chicago Cardinals	Bill Montgomery	Back	Fresno State
296	Chicago Bears	Bill Bigham	Tackle	Hardin
297	San Francisco 49ers	Jim Williams	End	Rice
298	Los Angeles Rams	Jim Bird	Tackle	USC
299	Cleveland Browns	Dom Moselle	Back	UW–Superior
300	Philadelphia Eagles	Al Lesko	Tackle	St. Bonaventure

=== Round 24 ===
Pick #	NFL team	Player	Position	College
301	Baltimore Colts	Bill Petroski	Tackle	Holy Cross
302	New York Bulldogs	Bill DeYoung	Back	Stanford
303	Green Bay Packers	Don Delph	Back	Dayton
304	Detroit Lions	Jim McDowell	Guard	William & Mary
305	Washington Redskins	Buster Tilton	Tackle	Nevada
306	New York Giants	Tom Finnin	Tackle	Detroit
307	Chicago Cardinals	Bob Gambold	Back	Washington State
308	Pittsburgh Steelers	John Weaver	Guard	Miami (OH)
309	San Francisco 49ers	Bill Wyman	Tackle	Rice
310	Chicago Bears	Walt Polenske	Back	Pacific
311	Los Angeles Rams	Joe Joiner	End	Austin
312	Cleveland Browns	Jack Woodland	Back	Bowling Green
313	Philadelphia Eagles	Tom DeSylvia	Guard	Oregon State

=== Round 25 ===
Pick #	NFL team	Player	Position	College
314	Baltimore Colts	Jim Pepper	Guard	Syracuse
315	New York Bulldogs	Steve Dotur	Guard	Oregon
316	Green Bay Packers	Frank Waters	Back	Michigan State
317	Detroit Lions	Gene Glick	Back	Michigan State
318	Washington Redskins	Art Stewart	Back	Southeastern State
319	New York Giants	Ken Beiersdorf	Back	Minnesota
320	Pittsburgh Steelers	Bob Numbers	Center	Lehigh
321	Chicago Cardinals	Lee Truman	Back	Kentucky
322	Chicago Bears	Perry Samuels	Back	Texas
323	San Francisco 49ers	Bob Dunn	Guard	Dayton
324	Los Angeles Rams	Dan Towler	Back	Washington & Jefferson
325	Cleveland Browns	Jim Brasher	Center	Maryland
326	Philadelphia Eagles	Jim Eagles	Center	North Texas State

=== Round 26 ===
Pick #	NFL team	Player	Position	College
327	Baltimore Colts	Geno Mazzanti	Back	Arkansas
328	New York Bulldogs	Red Noonan	Back	Alabama
329	Green Bay Packers	Claude Radtke	End	Lawrence
330	Detroit Lions	Bobby Coy Lee	Back	Texas
331	Washington Redskins	Earl Roth	Back	Maryland
332	New York Giants	Carl Copp	Tackle	Vanderbilt
333	Chicago Cardinals	Jim Pittman	Back	Mississippi State
334	Pittsburgh Steelers	Nick Vaccaro	Back	Florida
335	San Francisco 49ers	Jim Powers	Back	USC
336	Chicago Bears	George Sella	Back	Princeton
337	Los Angeles Rams	Otto Haldy	Tackle	Mankato State
338	Cleveland Browns	Charley Toogood	Tackle	Nebraska
339	Philadelphia Eagles	Rod Franz	Guard	California

=== Round 27 ===
Pick #	NFL team	Player	Position	College
340	Baltimore Colts	Mitford Johnson	Back	Baylor
341	New York Bulldogs	Chuck Olson	End	Washington
342	Green Bay Packers	Bill Osborne	Back	Nevada
343	Detroit Lions	Elbert Johnson	End	Texas Tech
344	Washington Redskins	Ed Lee	Tackle	Kansas
345	New York Giants	Art Sweet	Back	Baylor
346	Pittsburgh Steelers	Elmer Kreiser	End	Bloomsburg State
347	Chicago Cardinals	Tom Bienemann	End	Drake
348	Chicago Bears	Hook Davis	Back	Hardin–Simmons
349	San Francisco 49ers	Ken Johnson	Guard	Pacific
350	Los Angeles Rams	Hal Kilman	Tackle	TCU
351	Cleveland Browns	Dick Gray	Back	Oregon State
352	Philadelphia Eagles	Bill Martin	Back	USC

=== Round 28 ===
Pick #	NFL team	Player	Position	College
353	Baltimore Colts	John Adcock	Tackle	Auburn
354	New York Bulldogs	Ed Petty	Center	Hardin–Simmons
355	Green Bay Packers	Herm Hering	Back	Rutgers
356	Detroit Lions	Johnny Karras	Back	Illinois
357	Washington Redskins	Ralph Shoaf	Back	West Virginia
358	New York Giants	Don McAuliffe	Back	Michigan State
359	Chicago Cardinals	Sonny Jones	Back	Wyoming
360	Pittsburgh Steelers	Jerry Diehl	Back	Idaho
361	San Francisco 49ers	Charley Hall	Back	Arizona
362	Chicago Bears	Jim Kenary	Back	Harvard
363	Los Angeles Rams	Junior Morgan	End	San Jose State
364	Cleveland Browns	Billy Pyle	Back	Texas
365	Philadelphia Eagles	Don Burson	Back	Northwestern

=== Round 29 ===
Pick #	NFL team	Player	Position	College
366	Baltimore Colts	Snakey Graham	Back	Penn
367	New York Bulldogs	Ed Jasonek	Back	Furman
368	Green Bay Packers	Ben Zaranka	End	Kentucky
369	Detroit Lions	Russ Steger	Back	Illinois
370	Washington Redskins	Johnny Lundin	Guard	Minnesota
371	New York Giants	Mike Boyda	Back	Washington & Lee
372	Pittsburgh Steelers	Carl DePasqua	Back	Pittsburgh
373	Chicago Cardinals	Bill Montagne	Back	California
374	Chicago Bears	Fred Nadherny	Back	Yale
375	San Francisco 49ers	Bob Whelan	Back	Boston University
376	Los Angeles Rams	Bob Heck	Back	Pacific
377	Cleveland Browns	Bob Schnelker	End	Bowling Green
378	Philadelphia Eagles	Wes Curtier	Tackle	Richmond

=== Round 30 ===
Pick #	NFL team	Player	Position	College
379	Baltimore Colts	Tom Blake	Guard	Cincinnati
380	New York Bulldogs	John Poulos	Back	Pacific
381	Green Bay Packers	Ray Mallouf†	Back	SMU
382	Detroit Lions	Rube DeRoin	Center	Oklahoma A&M
383	Washington Redskins	Bob Noppinger	End	Georgetown
384	New York Giants	Hamp Tanner	Tackle	Georgia
385	Chicago Cardinals	Vick Banonis	Center	Georgetown
386	Pittsburgh Steelers	Ed Hudak	Tackle	Notre Dame
387	San Francisco 49ers	Bob Stillwell	End	USC
388	Chicago Bears	Allen Markert	Tackle	Minnesota
389	Los Angeles Rams	Bill Lange	Guard	Dayton
390	Cleveland Browns	Jim Massey	Back	Detroit
391	Philadelphia Eagles	Dud Parker	Back	Baylor

= Pro Bowler	= Hall of Famer

† Ray Mallouf was an NFL veteran, originally selected in the 1941 NFL draft, who had already played four seasons for the Chicago Cardinals and one season for the New York Giants. The Giants released Mallouf just before the 1950 draft.

== Hall of Famers ==
- Art Donovan, defensive tackle from Boston College taken in the 3rd round of the 1950 AAFC dispersal draft by the Baltimore Colts.

Inducted: Professional Football Hall of Fame class of 1968.

- Leo Nomellini, tackle from Minnesota taken 1st round 11th overall by the San Francisco 49ers.

Inducted: Professional Football Hall of Fame class of 1969.

- Ernie Stautner, defensive tackle from Boston College taken 2nd round 22nd overall by the Pittsburgh Steelers.

Inducted: Professional Football Hall of Fame class of 1969.

- Bud Grant, end from Minnesota taken 1st round 14th overall by the Philadelphia Eagles.

Inducted: Professional Football Hall of Fame class of 1994 as a coach, not a player.

- Lou Creekmur, tackle from William & Mary taken in the 2nd round of the 1950 AAFC dispersal draft by the Detroit Lions.

Inducted: Professional Football Hall of Fame class of 1996.

== Notable undrafted players ==
^{†}	= Pro Bowler

Original NFL team	Player	Pos.	College	Notes
Los Angeles Rams	Bob Boyd ^{†}	CB	Loyola (CA)	
New York Bulldogs	Sherman Howard	HB	Nevada	
Philadelphia Eagles	Toy Ledbetter	HB	Oklahoma A&M	
