= 1951 Pro Bowl =

National Football League all-star game

1951 National–American Pro Bowl
- Official program
American Conference	National Conference
28	27
Head coach: Paul Brown (Cleveland Browns)	Head coach: Joe Stydahar (Los Angeles Rams)
	1	2	3	4	Total
American Conference	7	7	14	0	28
National Conference	7	13	7	0	27
- Date: January 14, 1951
- Stadium: Memorial Coliseum; Los Angeles, California
- MVP: Otto Graham (Cleveland Browns)
- Attendance: 53,676

TV in the United States
- Network: not televised

The 1951 Pro Bowl was the National Football League's inaugural Pro Bowl which featured the league's outstanding performers from the 1950 season. The game was played on Sunday, January 14, 1951, at the Los Angeles Memorial Coliseum in Los Angeles, California in front of 53,676 fans, with the American Conference squad defeating the National Conference by a score of 28–27.

Players were selected by a vote of each conferences coaches along with the sports editors of the newspapers in the Los Angeles area, where the game was contested.

The National team was led by the Los Angeles Rams' Joe Stydahar while Paul Brown of the Cleveland Browns coached the American stars. The same two coaches had faced each other three weeks earlier in the 1950 NFL Championship Game in which Brown's team had also defeated Stydahar's. Both coaches employed the T formation offense in the Pro Bowl.

Cleveland Browns quarterback Otto Graham was named the game's outstanding player.

== Background ==
The NFL's annual Pro-Bowl game began according to the model of the league's other annual exhibition, the Chicago Charities College All-Star Game, initiated in 1934 under the auspices of the Chicago Tribune. This game, played in the summer ahead of the league's pre-season slate of exhibition games, pitted a select team of college all-stars coming into the league against the NFL's champion of the previous year. With proceeds of the game dedicated to charity, the Chicago College All-Star Game had become an institution, drawing vast audiences and priming fans for the football season to come.

Coupon soliciting the purchase of tickets for the first Pro-Bowl Game, with prices ranging from $2.50 to $5.00.

The Pro-Bowl was initially envisioned as a comparable post-season spectacle, held in sunny Southern California in January in the capacious Los Angeles Memorial Coliseum following conclusion of the regular season and World Championship Game. With the size of the NFL boosted in 1950 from 10 teams to 13 through absorption of three teams from the All-America Football Conference, the time seemed right for an exhibition contest between the year's stars of the NFL's two newly realigned conferences.

As with the Chicago game, newspapers were to play a prominent role in the game's organization, with the Los Angeles Newspaper Publishers' Association the chief organizing body. The Los Angeles Times had already sponsored NFL All-Star games after the 1938, 1939, and 1940 seasons, with the eruption of World War II bringing an end to this first series of January games.

The decision was made to relaunch the All-Star games under the "Pro Bowl" moniker by the league's 13 owners, meeting in Philadelphia over the first weekend of June 1950. Three organizations submitted bids to host the event — the Los Angeles Newspaper Publishers' Association, the Al Malaikah Shrine of Los Angeles, and promoters from Houston, Texas — with NFL Commissioner Bert Bell expressing the view that the league was "morally obligated" to return to the Los Angeles newspaper publishers over the other potential sponsors.

Bell specified that provision must be made that each participating player should receive at least $500 plus traveling expenses for the game to be formally approved by the league office. The door was left open by Bell to co-sponsorship of the event by the publishers and the Shriners, with a July 1 deadline for a working agreement to be hashed out. Ultimately, no such joint sponsorship followed.

== Rosters ==
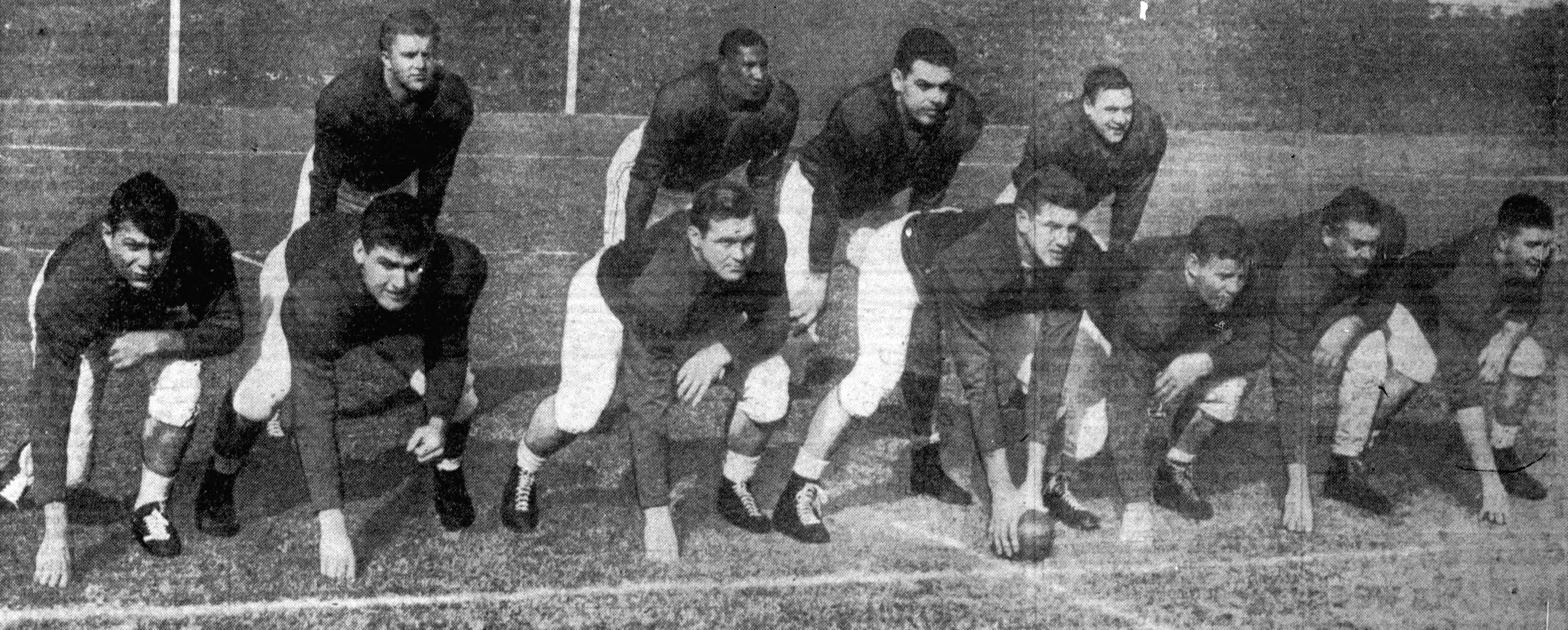
Members of the 1951 American Conference offense. Backs (L to R): Geri, Motley, Graham, and Dudley. Linemen (L to R): Pihos, DeRogatis, Barnes, Bednarik, Fischer, Weinmeister, and Speedie.

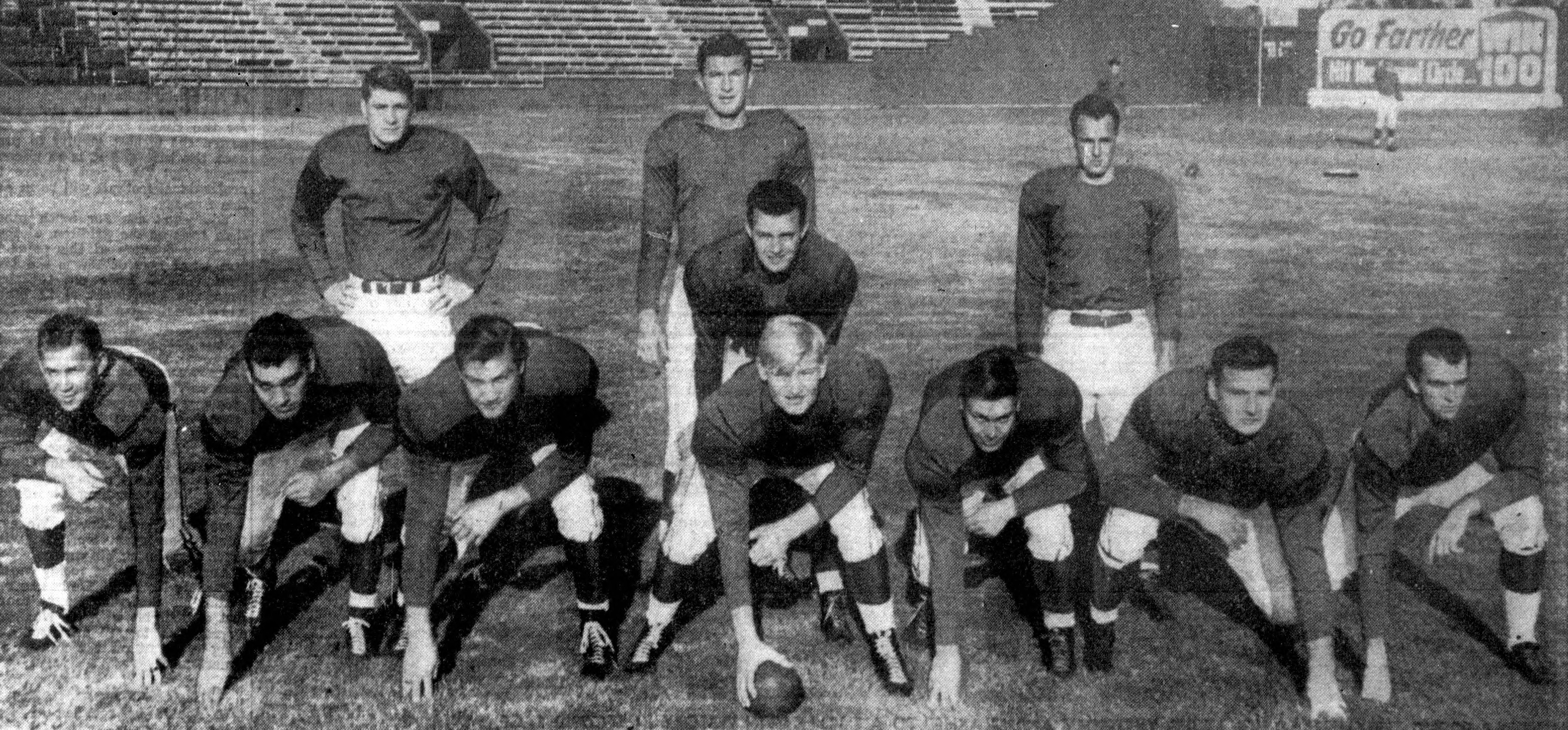
Members of the 1951 National Conference offense. Backs (L to R): Grimes, Hoerner, Van Brocklin, and Davis. Linemen (L to R): Edwards, Connor, Creekmur, Ecklund, Barwegan, Davis, and Fears.

The 31-man Pro Bowl squads consisted of the following players:

American Conference	Position	National Conference
Charlie Conerly^{[a]} – Giants; Harry Gilmer – Redskins; Otto Graham – Browns; Jim Hardy – Cardinals	Quarterback	Frankie Albert – 49ers Johnny Lujack – Bears; Norm Van Brocklin – Rams; Bob Waterfield – Rams
Elmer Angsman – Cardinals; Bill Dudley – Redskins; Joe Geri – Steelers; Gene Roberts – Giants; Otto Schnellbacher – Giants; Emlen Tunnell – Giants	Halfback	Glenn Davis – Rams; Don Doll – Lions; Billy Grimes – Packers; Woodley Lewis – Rams; Spec Sanders – Yanks; Johnny Strzykalski – 49ers Doak Walker – Lions
Tony Adamle – Browns; Pat Harder – Cardinals; Marion Motley – Browns; Jerry Shipkey – Steelers	Fullback	Dick Hoerner – Rams; Zollie Toth – Yanks; Norm Standlee – 49ers
John Green – Eagles; Pete Pihos – Eagles; Ray Poole^{[a]} – Giants; Bob Shaw – Cardinals; Mac Speedie – Browns; Bob Dove^{[b]} – Cardinals	End	Cloyce Box –Lions; Larry Brink – Rams; Dan Edwards – Yanks; Tom Fears – Rams; Ed Sprinkle – Bears
Al DeRogatis – Giants; Lou Groza – Browns; Paul Lipscomb – Redskins; Arnie Weinmeister – Giants; Al Wistert – Eagles	Tackle	George Connor – Bears; Fred Davis – Bears; Dick Huffman – Rams; Thurman McGraw – Lions; Leo Nomellini – 49ers
Walt Barnes – Eagles; Bill Fischer – Cardinals; Weldon Humble – Browns; Bill Willis – Browns	Guard	Dick Barwegan – Bears; Ray Bray – Bears; Lou Creekmur – Lions; Visco Grgich – 49ers
Chuck Bednarik – Eagles; John Cannady – Giants; Bill Walsh – Steelers	Center	Ed Neal – Packers; Clayton Tonnemaker^{[a]} – Packers; Bulldog Turner – Bears; Brad Ecklund^{[b]} – Yanks

Roster Notes:

^{a} Selected but did not play
^{b} Replacement selection due to injury or vacancy

== Number of selections by team ==
Note: these numbers include players selected to the team but unable to play as well as replacements for these players, so there are more than 31 players in each conference.

American Team	Selections
New York Giants	8
Cleveland Browns	7
Chicago Cardinals	6
Philadelphia Eagles	5
Pittsburgh Steelers	3
Washington Redskins	3

National Team	Selections
Los Angeles Rams	8
Chicago Bears	7
Detroit Lions	5
San Francisco 49ers	5
New York Yanks	4
Green Bay Packers	3
Baltimore Colts	0
