= 1950 Washington Redskins season =

NFL team season

- Owner: George Preston Marshall
- General manager: Dick McCann
- Head coach: Herman Ball
- Home stadium: Griffith Stadium

Results
- Record: 3–9
- Division place: 6th NFL American
- Playoffs: Did not qualify

The 1950 Washington Redskins season was the franchise's 19th season in the National Football League (NFL) and their 7th in Washington, D.C. The team failed to improve on their 4–7–1 record from 1949 and finished 3–9.

Although the NFL formally desegregated in 1946, many teams were slow to allow black athletes to compete even after the formal barrier had fallen. None were less willing to desegregate than the Washington Redskins, who sought to be the "home team" for a vast Southern market. The Redskins would remain the last bastion of racial segregation in the NFL, refusing to include a single black player on their roster until 1962.

== Preseason ==
| Game | Date | Opponent | Result | Record | Venue | Attendance | Sources |
|---|---|---|---|---|---|---|---|
| 1 | August 16 | at Los Angeles Rams | W 17–14 | 1–0 | Los Angeles Memorial Coliseum | 90,135 | |
| 2 | August 20 | at San Francisco 49ers | W 31–12 | 2–0 | Kezar Stadium | 49,777 | |
| 3 | August 26 | vs. Chicago Cardinals | W 31–7 | 3–0 | University of Denver Stadium (Denver, CO) | 17,000 | |
| 4 | August 30 | vs. Detroit Lions | W 28–24 | 4–0 | Cotton Bowl (Dallas, TX) | 50,000 | |
| 5 | September 7 | vs. New York Yanks | W 24–7 | 5–0 | Blues Stadium (Kansas City, MO) | 13,143 | |
Note: All night games except August 20.

== Regular season ==
Tickets for individual games for the 1950 season went on sale simultaneously one week before the start of the season. Seats in the grandstands, field stands, and lower boxes were available for $3.60 per game, with premium seats in the upper boxes, sideline boxes, and field boxes priced at $5.00, amusement tax included. Season ticket booklets for the six game package were priced at $19.80 and $25.20 for the two price tiers and gave the purchaser best available seats for the 1950 season and a first chance at upgrading location in 1951.

The 1950 season saw the admission of three new teams into the NFL from the defunct All-America Football Conference — the Cleveland Browns, Baltimore Colts, and San Francisco 49ers. This necessitated a restructuring of the league into an American and National Conference, consisting of 6 and 7 teams, respectively. Twelve of these teams played a 12-game slate featuring five home-and-home contests with conference opponents, with the Colts the odd-team out playing one game against each of the other 12 teams in the league. In an effort to build local rivalries, the Redskins gave up their game with the Chicago Cardinals and the Colts gave up their game with the Chicago Bears so that the two Chicago teams could play home-and-home games while the neighboring Redskins and Colts could do likewise.

=== Schedule ===
| Game | Date | Opponent | Result | Record | Venue | Attendance | Recap | Sources |
|---|---|---|---|---|---|---|---|---|
| 1 | September 17 | at Baltimore Colts | **W** 38–14 | 1–0 | Memorial Stadium | 26,267 | Recap | |
| 2 | September 24 | at Green Bay Packers | **L** 21–35 | 1–1 | Wisconsin State Fair Park | 14,109 | Recap | |
| 3 | October 1 | **Pittsburgh Steelers** | **L** 7–26 | 1–2 | Griffith Stadium | 25,008 | Recap | |
| 4 | October 8 | **New York Giants** | **L** 17–21 | 1–3 | Griffith Stadium | 19,288 | Recap | |
| — | Bye | | | | | | | |
| 5 | October 22 | **Chicago Cardinals** | **L** 28–38 | 1–4 | Griffith Stadium | 27,856 | Recap | |
| 6 | October 29 | at **Philadelphia Eagles** | **L** 3–35 | 1–5 | Shibe Park | 33,707 | Recap | |
| 7 | November 5 | at New York Giants | **L** 21–24 | 1–6 | Polo Grounds | 23,909 | Recap | |
| 8 | November 12 | **Philadelphia Eagles** | **L** 0–33 | 1–7 | Griffith Stadium | 29,407 | Recap | |
| 9 | November 19 | at **Cleveland Browns** | **L** 14–20 | 1–8 | Cleveland Municipal Stadium | 21,908 | Recap | |
| 10 | November 26 | Baltimore Colts | **W** 38–28 | 2–8 | Griffith Stadium | 21,275 | Recap | |
| 11 | December 3 | at **Pittsburgh Steelers** | **W** 24–7 | 3–8 | Forbes Field | 19,741 | Recap | |
| 12 | December 10 | **Cleveland Browns** | **L** 21–45 | 3–9 | Griffith Stadium | 30,143 | Recap | |
Note: Intra-conference opponents are in **bold** text.

== Standings ==
NFL American Conference
| | W | L | T | PCT | CONF | PF | PA | STK |
|---|---|---|---|---|---|---|---|---|
| Cleveland Browns | 10 | 2 | 0 | .833 | 8–2 | 310 | 144 | W6 |
| New York Giants | 10 | 2 | 0 | .833 | 8–2 | 268 | 150 | W6 |
| Pittsburgh Steelers | 6 | 6 | 0 | .500 | 5–5 | 180 | 195 | W1 |
| Philadelphia Eagles | 6 | 6 | 0 | .500 | 4–6 | 254 | 141 | L4 |
| Chicago Cardinals | 5 | 7 | 0 | .417 | 3–6 | 233 | 287 | L1 |
| Washington Redskins | 3 | 9 | 0 | .250 | 1–8 | 232 | 326 | L1 |

Note: Tie games were not officially counted in the standings until 1972.

== Roster ==
1950 Washington Redskins final roster
| Quarterbacks: 33 Sammy Baugh; 52 Harry Gilmer; Running backs: 35 Bill Dudley K/P/S; 21 Rob Goode CB; 22 Charlie Justice; 20 George Thomas; Receivers: 28 Hugh Taylor; 37 Joe Tereshinski DE | Linemen: 57 John Badaczewski MG; 18 Ed Berrang DE/WR; 81 Dan Brown DE; 82 Roland Dale DE; 53 Al DeMao C/LB; 87 Clyde Goodnight DE/WR; 48 Bob Hendren T/DT; 71 Jerry Houghton T; 70 Lou Karras T; 76 Paul Lipscomb DT/T; 61 Gene Pepper DT/G; 63 Herb Siegert G/LB; 16 John Steber G; 56 Harry Ulinski C/LB; 62 Cas Witucki G | Linebackers: 25 Hardy Brown; 36 Chuck Drazenovich FB; 34 Ed Quirk C; Defensive backs: 22 Harry Dowda CB/RB; 23 Hall Haynes S/P/RB; 99 Eddie Saenz S/RB; 27 Joe Bartos CB/RB; Reserve list: -- Eddie LeBaron QB (Military); 47 Laurie Niemi T/DT (IR); 32 Pete Stout FB/LB (IR); rookies in italics |
