= 1950 Philadelphia Eagles season =

NFL team season

- Owner: Happy Hundred
- Head coach: Greasy Neale
- Home stadium: Shibe Park

Results
- Record: 6–6
- Division place: 3rd (tied) NFL American
- Playoffs: Did not qualify
- Pro Bowlers: MG Walt Barnes; DE John Green; RT Al Wistert; RE Pete Pihos; LB/C Chuck Bednarik

The 1950 Philadelphia Eagles season was their 18th in the league. The team failed to improve on their previous output of 11–1, winning only six games. The team failed to qualify for the playoffs for the first time in four seasons.

== Off season ==
The National Football League and the All-America Football Conference came to an agreement. The Baltimore Colts, Cleveland Browns, and San Francisco 49ers would join the older NFL. The Philadelphia Eagles would meet the Cleveland Browns in a Saturday night game to open the 1950 season in Philadelphia Municipal Stadium instead of Shibe Park for more seating. On September 16, 1950, a crowd of 71,237 turned out in Philadelphia to watch as the Browns won 35–10.

=== NFL draft ===
The 1950 NFL draft was held on January 20–21, 1950. The former AAFC teams got to pick with the NFL teams and the Detroit Lions won the lottery pick. They used it to select Leon Hart, who played end at the University of Notre Dame. With an 11–1 record in the 1949 season and Cleveland at 9–1–2, the Eagles picked last in each round.

The Eagles first draft pick went to University of Minnesota for football and basketball. He chose and played for the Minneapolis Lakers in the NBA during the 1950 season. He would join the Eagles in 1951 but left the Eagles after two seasons over money to play in Canadian Football League. He would later go into the Canadian Football Hall of Fame in 1983 and the Pro Football Hall of Fame as a coach in 1994.

=== Player selections ===
The table shows the Eagles selections and what picks they had that were traded away and the team that ended up with that pick. It is possible the Eagles' pick ended up with this team via another team that the Eagles made a trade with. Not shown are acquired picks that the Eagles traded away.

| = Pro Bowler | = NFL Hall of Famer | =Canadian Football Hall of Famer |

| Rd | Pick | Player | Position | School |
|---|---|---|---|---|
| 1 | 14 | Bud Grant^{(Also Pro Football Hall of Fame member as Vikings coach)} | End | Minnesota |
| 2 | 27 | _{Pick Taken by Detroit Lions} | | |
| 3 | 40 | Bob Sanders | Back | Oregon |
| 4 | 53 | Bob McChesney | End | Hardin–Simmons |
| 5 | 66 | Mike Kaysserian | Back | University of Detroit |
| 6 | 79 | Lloyd McDermott | Tackle | Kentucky |
| 7 | 92 | Mel Olix | Back | Miami (OH) |
| 8 | 105 | Dick O'Hanlon | Tackle | Ohio State |
| 9 | 118 | Bobby Wilson | Back | Mississippi |
| 10 | 131 | Ernie Johnson | Back | UCLA |
| 11 | 144 | Bobby Lantrip | Back | Rice |
| 12 | 157 | Frank Mahoney | End | Brown |
| 13 | 170 | Norm "Wildman" Willey | Back | Marshall |
| 14 | 183 | Billy Hix | End | Arkansas |
| 15 | 196 | Herb Carey | Back | Dartmouth |
| 16 | 209 | Jim Marck | Tackle | Xavier |
| 17 | 222 | Jerry Taylor | Center | Mississippi |
| 18 | 235 | Ed Tunnicliff | Back | Northwestern |
| 19 | 248 | Darrell Robinson | End | Oregon |
| 20 | 261 | BenJamin Nixx | Guard | Michigan |
| 21 | 274 | Marv Cross | Back | Washington State |
| 22 | 287 | Jim Hague | End | Ohio State |
| 23 | 300 | Al Lesko | Tackle | St. Bonaventure |
| 24 | 313 | Tom DeSylvia | Guard | Oregon State |
| 25 | 326 | Jim Eagles | Center | North Texas State |
| 26 | 339 | Rod Franz | Guard | California |
| 27 | 352 | Bill Martin | Back | USC |
| 28 | 365 | Don Burson | Back | Northwestern University |
| 29 | 378 | Wes Curtier | Tackle | Richmond |
| 30 | 391 | Dud Parker | Back | Baylor |

=== 1950 AAFC dispersal draft ===
The NFL and AAFC were rivals for four years. In 1949 it was agreed to allow three teams from the AAFC to join the NFL; there was an AAFC dispersal draft of players done. Below are whom the Eagles selected in the draft. The National Football League held the dispersal draft on June 2, 1950. The draft order was determined by the order of finish of the 1949 season. Because Green Bay and Baltimore were the weakest teams they were given extra picks: two picks each between rounds 3 and 4, one between rounds 5 and 6, 7 and 8 and between 9 and 10.

| Round | Pick | Player | Position | School | AAFC Team |
| 1 | 13 | Lindell Pearson | Halfback | Oklahoma | |
| 2 | 26 | Jerry Krall | Fullback | Ohio State | Los Angeles Dons |
| 3 | 39 | George Pastre | Tackle | | Los Angeles Dons |
| 4 | 56 | Paul Gibson | End | North Carolina St. | Buffalo Bills |
| 5 | 69 | Joseph Sutton | Halfback | Temple | Buffalo Bills |
| 6 | 84 | Hosea Rodgers | Fullback | Alabama and North Carolina | Los Angeles Dons |
| 7 | 97 | Don Panciera | Quarterback | Boston College and San Francisco | New York Yankees |
| 8 | 112 | Caleb Washington | Center | | Brooklyn Dodgers |
| 9 | 125 | Carmen Falcone | Quarterback | | |
| 10 | 140 | Gil Johnson | Quarter/Half Back | SMU | New York Yankees |

== Schedule ==
| Game | Date | Opponent | Result | Record | Venue | Attendance | Recap | Sources |
|---|---|---|---|---|---|---|---|---|
| 1 | September 16 | **Cleveland Browns** | **L** 10–35 | 0–1 | Philadelphia Municipal Stadium | 71,237 | Recap | |
| 2 | September 24 | at **Chicago Cardinals** | **W** 45–7 | 1–1 | Comiskey Park | 24,914 | Recap | |
| — | Bye | | | | | | | |
| 3 | October 7 | Los Angeles Rams | **W** 56–20 | 2–1 | Shibe Park | 24,134 | Recap | |
| 4 | October 15 | at Baltimore Colts | **W** 24–14 | 3–1 | Municipal Stadium | 14,413 | Recap | |
| 5 | October 22 | at **Pittsburgh Steelers** | **W** 17–10 | 4–1 | Forbes Field | 35,662 | Recap | |
| 6 | October 29 | **Washington Redskins** | **W** 35–3 | 5–1 | Shibe Park | 33,707 | Recap | |
| 7 | November 5 | **Pittsburgh Steelers** | **L** 7–9 | 5–2 | Shibe Park | 24,629 | Recap | |
| 8 | November 12 | at **Washington Redskins** | **W** 33–0 | 6–2 | Griffith Stadium | 29,407 | Recap | |
| 9 | November 19 | **Chicago Cardinals** | **L** 10–14 | 6–3 | Shibe Park | 28,368 | Recap | |
| 10 | November 26 | at **New York Giants** | **L** 3–7 | 6–4 | Polo Grounds | 24,093 | Recap | |
| 11 | December 3 | at **Cleveland Browns** | **L** 7–13 | 6–5 | Cleveland Stadium | 37,490 | Recap | |
| 12 | December 10 | **New York Giants** | **L** 7–9 | 6–6 | Shibe Park | 26,440 | Recap | |
Note: Intra-conference opponents are in **bold** text.

== Roster ==
(All time List of Philadelphia Eagles players in franchise history)

| = 1950 Pro Bowl Selection | = Hall of Famer |

- + After name means 1st team selection

| NO. | Player | AGE | POS | GP | GS | WT | HT | YRS | College |
|---|---|---|---|---|---|---|---|---|---|
| | Greasy Neale | 59 | Coach | | | | | 10th | West Virginia Wesleyan |
| 80 | Neill Armstrong | 24 | E-DB | 12 | 0 | 189 | 6–2 | 3 | Oklahoma State |
| 74 | Walt Barnes | 32 | G | 12 | 0 | 238 | 6–1 | 2 | LSU |
| 60 | Chuck Bednarik+ | 25 | LB-C | 12 | 0 | 233 | 6–3 | 1 | Pennsylvania |
| 21 | Bill Boedeker | 26 | HB | 1 | 0 | 192 | 5–11 | 4 | DePaul |
| 33 | Russ Craft | 31 | DB-HB | 12 | 0 | 178 | 5–9 | 4 | Alabama |
| 83 | Jack Ferrante | 34 | E-DE | 12 | 0 | 197 | 6–1 | 9 | none |
| 64 | Mario Giannelli | 30 | MG-G | 12 | 0 | 265 | 6–0 | 2 | Boston College |
| 89 | John Green* | 29 | DE-E | 12 | 0 | 192 | 6–1 | 3 | Tulsa |
| 85 | Billy Hix | 21 | E | 11 | 0 | 215 | 6–2 | Rookie | Arkansas |
| 78 | Mike Jarmoluk | 28 | DT-T-MG | 12 | 0 | 232 | 6–5 | 4 | Temple |
| 76 | Bucko Kilroy | 29 | G-MG-T-DT | 12 | 0 | 243 | 6–2 | 7 | _{Notre Dame, and Temple} |
| 21 | Toy Ledbetter | 23 | HB | 10 | 0 | 198 | 5–10 | Rookie | Oklahoma State |
| 52 | Vic Lindskog | 36 | C | 12 | 0 | 203 | 6–1 | 6 | Stanford |
| 88 | Jay McDowell | 31 | T-DE | 12 | 0 | 217 | 6–2 | 4 | Washington |
| 39 | Bill Mackrides | 25 | QB | 8 | 0 | 182 | 5–11 | 3 | Nevada-Reno |
| 67 | John Magee | 27 | G | 12 | 0 | 220 | 5–10 | 2 | La-Lafayette, Rice |
| 61 | Duke Maronic | 29 | G | 12 | 0 | 209 | 5–9 | 6 | none |
| 49 | Pat McHugh | 31 | DB-HB | 12 | 0 | 166 | 5–11 | 3 | Georgia Tech |
| 36 | Joe Muha | 29 | FB-LB | 11 | 0 | 205 | 6–1 | 4 | VMI |
| 32 | Jack Myers | 26 | FB-QB-LB | 12 | 0 | 200 | 6–2 | 2 | UCLA |
| 43 | Jim Parmer | 24 | FB-HB | 10 | 0 | 193 | 6–0 | 2 | _{Oklahoma State, and Texas A&M} |
| 65 | Cliff Patton | 27 | G-LB | 12 | 0 | 243 | 6–2 | 4 | TCU |
| 35 | Pete Pihos* | 27 | E-DE | 12 | 0 | 210 | 6–1 | 3 | Indiana |
| 40 | Frank Reagan | 31 | B | 12 | 0 | 182 | 5–11 | 9 | Pennsylvania |
| 31 | Dan Sandifer | 23 | DB-HB | 5 | 0 | 190 | 6–1 | 2 | LSU |
| 27 | Clyde Scott | 26 | HB-DB | 1 | 0 | 174 | 6–0 | 1 | _{Arkansas, and Navy} |
| 79 | Vic Sears | 32 | T-DT | 12 | 0 | 223 | 6–3 | 9 | Oregon State |
| 72 | Walt Stickel | 28 | T-DT | 12 | 0 | 247 | 6–3 | 4 | _{Pennsylvania, and Tulsa} |
| 45 | Joe Sutton | 26 | DB-HB | 9 | 0 | 180 | 5–11 | 1 | Temple |
| 11 | Tommy Thompson | 34 | QB | 12 | 12 | 192 | 6–1 | 10 | Tulsa |
| 15 | Steve Van Buren | 30 | HB | 10 | 0 | 200 | 6–0 | 6 | LSU |
| 44 | Norm Willey | DE-G-E | 23 | 12 | 0 | 224 | 6–2 | Rookie | Marshall |
| 70 | Al Wistert | G-T-DT | 30 | 11 | 0 | 214 | 6–1 | 7 | Michigan |
| 53 | Alex Wojciechowicz | 35 | C-LB-E | 7 | 0 | 217 | 5–11 | 12 | Fordham |
| 41 | Frank Ziegler | 27 | HB-DB | 12 | 0 | 175 | 5–11 | 1 | Georgia Tech |
| | 35 Players; Team Average | 28.3 | | 12 | | 206.8 | 6–0.6 | 4.0 | |

== Standings ==
Program for the Eagles' October 29 home game against the Washington Redskins.

NFL American Conference
| | W | L | T | PCT | CONF | PF | PA | STK |
|---|---|---|---|---|---|---|---|---|
| Cleveland Browns | 10 | 2 | 0 | .833 | 8–2 | 310 | 144 | W6 |
| New York Giants | 10 | 2 | 0 | .833 | 8–2 | 268 | 150 | W6 |
| Pittsburgh Steelers | 6 | 6 | 0 | .500 | 5–5 | 180 | 195 | W1 |
| Philadelphia Eagles | 6 | 6 | 0 | .500 | 4–6 | 254 | 141 | L4 |
| Chicago Cardinals | 5 | 7 | 0 | .417 | 3–6 | 233 | 287 | L1 |
| Washington Redskins | 3 | 9 | 0 | .250 | 1–8 | 232 | 326 | L1 |

Note: Tie games were not officially counted in the standings until 1972.
