= Jim Lipinski =

American football player (1926–2011)

- Jim Lipinski, 1951

No. 64, 71
- Positions: Tackle, defensive tackle

Personal information
- Born: February 25, 1926; Monongah, West Virginia, U.S.
- Died: May 28, 2011 (aged 85); Sarasota, Florida, U.S.
- Listed height: 6 ft 4 in (1.93 m)
- Listed weight: 238 lb (108 kg)

Career information
- High school: Monongah
- College: Fairmont State (1946–1949)
- NFL draft: 1950: 22nd round, 281st overall pick

Career history
- Chicago Cardinals (1950); Calgary Stampeders (1951)

Career NFL statistics
- Games played: 1
- Stats at Pro Football Reference

James Victor Lipinski Sr. (February 25, 1926 – May 28, 2011) was an American professional football tackle and defensive tackle.

Lipinski was born in 1927 in Monongah, West Virginia, and attended Monongah High School. He served in the Navy during World War II.

After the war, Lipinski played college football for Fairmont University from 1946 to 1949. He also played basketball and baseball at Fairmont, earning a total of 12 varsity letters.

He was offered a contract to play professional baseball for the Boston Braves but instead opted to play professional football in the National Football League (NFL). In April 1950, he signed with the Chicago Cardinals. He appeared in one game for the Cardinals during the 1950 season.

In June 1951, he moved to Calgary with his wife Loreene and son Jimmy to play for the Calgary Stampeders in the Canadian Football League. He appeared in 13 games for the Stampeders during their 1951 season.

After retiring as a player, Lipinski coached at Dalton High School, Washington Court House, and Cuyahoga Falls. He died in 2011 in Sarasota, Florida.
