= Sam Nevills =

American gridiron football player (1925–2005)

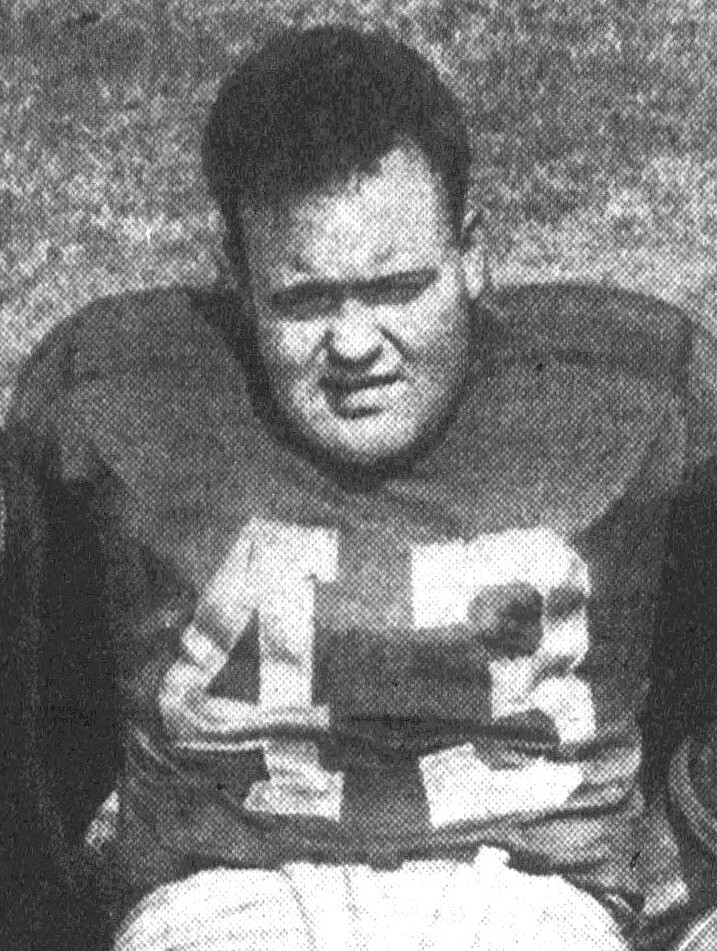
- Nevills, circa 1951

Profile
- Position: T

Personal information
- Born: July 19, 1925; Waterloo, Iowa, U.S.
- Died: March 28, 2005 (aged 79)
- Listed height: 6 ft 3 in (1.91 m)
- Listed weight: 240 lb (109 kg)

Career information
- College: Oregon
- NFL draft: 1950: 8th round, 102nd overall pick

Career history
- 1952–1953: Winnipeg Blue Bombers

Samuel Joseph Nevills (July 19, 1925 – March 28, 2005) was an American professional football player who played for the Winnipeg Blue Bombers. He played college football at Purdue University and the University of Oregon.
