= George Nicksich =

American football player (1928–1985)

- George Nicksich, 1957

Profile
- Positions: Middle guard, linebacker, guard

Personal information
- Born: May 5, 1928; Monessen, Pennsylvania
- Died: January 17, 1985 (aged 56); Monessen, Pennsylvania
- Listed height: 6 ft 0 in (1.83 m)
- Listed weight: 225 lb (102 kg)

Career information
- High school: Monessen (PA)
- College: St. Bonaventure

Career history
- Pittsburgh Steelers (1950)

Career statistics
- Games: 12
- Stats at Pro Football Reference

George "Jook" Nicksich (May 5, 1928 – January 17, 1985) was an American football player who played the middle guard, linebacker, and guard positions.

A native of Monessen, Pennsylvania, he played college football for St. Bonaventure.

He then played professional football in the National Football League (NFL) for the Pittsburgh Steelers during the 1950 season. He appeared in a total of 12 NFL games, all of them as a starter. He intercepted three passes for 31 yards. He was named rookie defensive lineman of the year in 1950, but he suffered a knee injury that ended his playing career.

After his football career ended, Nicksich operated a tavern in Monessen, Pennsylvania. The building was demolished in an urban renewal project, and he became a guard at the county jail in Monessen. Shortly after leaving his job as a guard at the jail, he was arrested in April 1968 for an alleged unarmed bank robbery. He handed a teller a note that said, "This is a stickup. Put the money in the bag and be quiet." He was given a bag with $5,890 and was arrested shortly after leaving the bank. After a psychological evaluation, he was found mentally unfit to stand trial in June 1968.

Nicksich died of liver failure in 1985 at Westmoreland Hospital in Greensburg, Pennsylvania.
