= Billy Hix =

American football player (1929–1974)

No. 85
- Positions: End, defensive end

Personal information
- Born: January 18, 1929; Batesville, Arkansas, U.S.
- Died: September 24, 1974 (aged 45)
- Listed height: 6 ft 2 in (1.88 m)
- Listed weight: 215 lb (98 kg)

Career information
- High school: Batesville
- College: Arkansas
- NFL draft: 1950: 14th round, 183rd overall pick

Career history
- Philadelphia Eagles (1950)

Career NFL statistics
- Receptions: 2
- Receiving yards: 25
- Stats at Pro Football Reference

William Stewart "Sleepy" Hix (January 18, 1929 – September 24, 1974) was an American professional football end who played principally at defensive end. He played college football for Arkansas from 1946 to 1949 and professional football for the Philadelphia Eagles in 1950.

== Early life ==
A native of Batesville, Arkansas, he played college football for the Arkansas Razorbacks from 1946 to 1949. He played principally at defensive end for Arkansas, though he also played some on offense during the 1949 season.

== Professional football ==
Hix was selected by the Philadelphia Eagles in the 14th round (183rd overall pick) of the 1950 NFL draft. In April 1951, Hix signed a contract with the Eagles. He was described as "one of the finest end prospects to come up to the NFL in several years." He appeared in 11 games for the Eagles, principally as a defensive end, during the 1950 season. Philadelphia coach Greasy Neale also experimented with using Hix on offense despite Hix's only evaluation that "I can't play any good on offense." He caught two passes for 25 yards during the 1950 season.

While playing for the Eagles, Hix was given the nickname "Sleepy" due to his sleeping more than any other player on the team. Asked about the nickname, he told The Philadelphia Inquirer: "Shucks, man. I'm a growing boy. I need that sleep to store up my energy."

== Military service and later years ==
Hix served as a second lieutenant in the Army infantry reserve corps. In August 1950, Hix was ordered to report for physical examination. In April 1951, after signing a 1951 contract with the Eagles, Hix was ordered to active duty with the Army.

Hix died in 1974.
