= 1950 New York Giants season =

NFL team 26th season

- Owner: Tim Mara
- Head coach: Steve Owen
- Home stadium: Polo Grounds

Results
- Record: 10–2
- Division place: 2nd NFL American
- Playoffs: Lost Conference Playoff (at Browns) 3–8
- Pro Bowlers: LH Gene Roberts; RT Al DeRogatis; QB Charlie Conerly; RLB John Cannady; SS Emlen Tunnell; DE Ray Poole; FS Otto Schnellbacher; DT Arnie Weinmeister

The 1950 New York Giants season was the franchise's 26th season in the National Football League. The team had eight selections to the inaugural Pro Bowl, tied for the most among all teams. The Giants finished tied for 1st place with the Cleveland Browns with a record of 10 wins and 2 losses. In the Conference Playoff the Giants lost to the Browns 8–3.

== Schedule ==
Week	Date	Opponent	Result	Record	Venue	Attendance	Recap	Sources
1	September 17	at **Pittsburgh Steelers**	**W** 18–7	1–0	Forbes Field	24,699	Recap	
Bye
2	October 1	at **Cleveland Browns**	**W** 6–0	2–0	Cleveland Stadium	37,647	Recap	
3	October 8	at **Washington Redskins**	**W** 21–17	3–0	Griffith Stadium	19,288	Recap	
4	October 15	**Pittsburgh Steelers**	**L** 6–17	3–1	Polo Grounds	21,725	Recap	
5	October 22	**Cleveland Browns**	**W** 17–13	4–1	Polo Grounds	41,734	Recap	
6	October 29	at **Chicago Cardinals**	**L** 3–17	4–2	Comiskey Park	23,964	Recap	
7	November 5	**Washington Redskins**	**W** 24–21	5–2	Polo Grounds	23,909	Recap	
8	November 12	**Chicago Cardinals**	**W** 51–21	6–2	Polo Grounds	22,380	Recap	
9	November 19	at Baltimore Colts	**W** 55–20	7–2	Municipal Stadium	14,573	Recap	
10	November 26	**Philadelphia Eagles**	**W** 7–3	8–2	Polo Grounds	24,093	Recap	
11	December 3	New York Yanks	**W** 51–7	9–2	Polo Grounds	41,630	Recap	
12	December 10	at **Philadelphia Eagles**	**W** 9–7	10–2	Shibe Park	26,440	Recap	
Note: Intra-conference opponents are in **bold** text.

== Playoffs ==
Round	Date	Opponent	Result	Record	Venue	Attendance	Recap	Sources
Divisional	December 17	at Cleveland Browns	L 3–8	0–1	Cleveland Stadium	33,054	Recap	

== Standings ==
NFL American Conference
	W	L	T	PCT	CONF	PF	PA	STK
Cleveland Browns	10	2	0	.833	8–2	310	144	W6
New York Giants	10	2	0	.833	8–2	268	150	W6
Pittsburgh Steelers	6	6	0	.500	5–5	180	195	W1
Philadelphia Eagles	6	6	0	.500	4–6	254	141	L4
Chicago Cardinals	5	7	0	.417	3–6	233	287	L1
Washington Redskins	3	9	0	.250	1–8	232	326	L1

Note: Tie games were not officially counted in the standings until 1972.

== Roster ==
1950 New York Giants final roster
Quarterbacks: 42 Charlie Conerly P; 20 Travis Tidwell; Running backs: 12 Randy Clay CB; 34 Bob Jackson; 16 Jim Ostendarp; 31 Eddie Price; 35 Gene Roberts; 30 Joe Scott; Receivers: 88 Bob McChesney; 80 Kelley Mote DE; 81 Bill Swiacki; 85 Ellery Williams	Linemen/Linebackers: 75 Bill Austin G/T; 60 Jon Baker MG/G; 52 John Cannady LB; 78 Al DeRogatis DT/T; 86 Jim Duncan DE; 74 Don Ettinger G/T; 66 John Mastrangelo T; 61 Bill Milner LB/G; 82 Ray Poole DE/WR/K; 53 John Rapacz C/LB; 79 George Roman T; 70 John Sanchez T/DT; 87 Leo Skladany DE; 21 Joe Sulaitis G; 73 Arnie Weinmeister DT/T; 77 Jim White T/DT; 51 Dick Woodard C/LB	Defensive backs: 49 Tom Landry CB/P; 22 Harmon Rowe CB; 83 Otto Schnellbacher S; 45 Emlen Tunnell S; Reserve list: -- Tom Finnin DT (Military); 41 Forrest Griffith RB (IR); 40 Jack Salscheider RB/CB (IR); rookies in italics

== See also ==
- List of New York Giants seasons
