= Tom Palmer (American football) =

American football player (1929–1980)

No. 77
- Position: Defensive tackle

Personal information
- Born: August 12, 1929; Wildwood, New Jersey, U.S.
- Died: February 3, 1980 (aged 50); Kingsport, Tennessee, U.S.
- Listed height: 6 ft 2 in (1.88 m)
- Listed weight: 240 lb (109 kg)

Career information
- High school: Collingswood (Collingswood, New Jersey)
- College: Wake Forest
- NFL draft: 1950: 17th round, 217th overall pick

Career history
- Chicago Cardinals (1950)*; Los Angeles Rams (1953)*; Pittsburgh Steelers (1953–1954)
- * Offseason or practice squad member only
- Stats at Pro Football Reference

Thomas Palmer (August 12, 1929 – February 3, 1980) was an American professional football defensive tackle who played for the Pittsburgh Steelers of the National Football League (NFL). He played college football for the Wake Forest Demon Deacons and was selected by the Chicago Cardinals in the 17th round of the 1950 NFL draft.

== Early life ==
Thomas Palmer was born on August 12, 1929, in Wildwood, New Jersey. Raised in Collingswood, New Jersey, he attended Collingswood High School.

== College career ==
Palmer played college football for the Wake Forest Demon Deacons. He was a two-year varsity letterman at right tackle from 1948 to 1949.

== Professional career ==
Palmer was selected by the Chicago Cardinals in the 17th round, with the 217th overall pick, of the 1950 NFL draft. He signed with the team on May 17, 1950. He was released three weeks into training camp. After not receiving interest from any other NFL teams, Palmer decided to join the United States Army. He served during the Korean War.

On September 20, 1952, in an exhibition game between Fort Jackson and the Philadelphia Eagles, Palmer had an impressive performance. Some members of the Los Angeles Rams' coaching staff were in attendance and wanted to sign Palmer but did not have a blank contract. The Rams acquired a contract form from the Eagles, who were also interested in Palmer, by lying and saying that they were going to sign one of their own draft picks who were playing for the Fort Jackson team. The Rams signed Palmer to a futures contract before the Eagles were able to sign him. He continued playing with Fort Jackson during the 1952 season, and was named to the All-Army first football team in December 1952.

On September 20, 1953, the Rams traded Palmer to the Pittsburgh Steelers for an eighth-round pick in the 1955 NFL draft. He played in 11 of 12 games, starting five, at defensive tackle for the Steelers in 1953. He appeared in the first seven games of the 1954 season, starting three, before being placed on injured reserve on November 10, 1954. Palmer was released on September 19, 1955, before the start of the 1955 regular season.

== Personal life ==
Palmer worked in the cost accounting department of the Tennessee Eastman Company for 22 years. He died on February 3, 1980, at Holston Valley Community Hospital in Kingsport, Tennessee.
