= 1950 Pittsburgh Steelers season =

NFL team season

- Owner: Rooney family
- Head coach: John Michelosen
- Home stadium: Forbes Field

Results
- Record: 6–6
- Division place: 3rd (tied) American
- Playoffs: Did not qualify
- All-Pros: Joe Geri (1st team)
- Pro Bowlers: 3: HB Joe Geri; FB Jerry Shipkey; C Bill Walsh

Program for the Steelers' December 3 game against Sammy Baugh and the visiting Washington Redskins.

The 1950 Pittsburgh Steelers season was the franchise's 18th season in the National Football League (NFL). It was the team's third season under head coach John Michelosen who had led the team to a combined 10–13–1 record over the previous two years.

Despite finishing last in the league in scoring, the team compiled a 6–6 record which left them tied for third place among the six teams in the NFL's American Conference. The Steelers were the league's only team that employed the single wing; most of the league's other franchises had switched to the T formation.

== Regular season ==
=== Schedule ===
| Week | Date | Opponent | Result | Record | Venue | Recap |
|---|---|---|---|---|---|---|
| 1 | September 17 | **New York Giants** | **L** 7–18 | 0–1 | Forbes Field | Recap |
| 2 | September 24 | at Detroit Lions | **L** 7–10 | 0–2 | Briggs Stadium | Recap |
| 3 | October 1 | at **Washington Redskins** | **W** 26–7 | 1–2 | Griffith Stadium | Recap |
| 4 | October 7 | **Cleveland Browns** | **L** 17–30 | 1–3 | Forbes Field | Recap |
| 5 | October 15 | at **New York Giants** | **W** 17–6 | 2–3 | Polo Grounds | Recap |
| 6 | October 22 | **Philadelphia Eagles** | **L** 10–17 | 2–4 | Forbes Field | Recap |
| 7 | October 29 | at **Cleveland Browns** | **L** 7–45 | 2–5 | Cleveland Stadium | Recap |
| 8 | November 5 | at **Philadelphia Eagles** | **W** 9–7 | 3–5 | Shibe Park | Recap |
| 9 | November 12 | Baltimore Colts | **W** 17–7 | 4–5 | Forbes Field | Recap |
| 10 | Bye | | | | | |
| 11 | November 23 | at **Chicago Cardinals** | **W** 28–17 | 5–5 | Comiskey Park | Recap |
| 12 | December 3 | **Washington Redskins** | **L** 7–24 | 5–6 | Forbes Field | Recap |
| 13 | December 10 | **Chicago Cardinals** | **W** 28–7 | 6–6 | Forbes Field | Recap |
Note: Intra-conference opponents are in **bold** text.

== Standings ==
NFL American Conference
| | W | L | T | PCT | CONF | PF | PA | STK |
|---|---|---|---|---|---|---|---|---|
| Cleveland Browns | 10 | 2 | 0 | .833 | 8–2 | 310 | 144 | W6 |
| New York Giants | 10 | 2 | 0 | .833 | 8–2 | 268 | 150 | W6 |
| Pittsburgh Steelers | 6 | 6 | 0 | .500 | 5–5 | 180 | 195 | W1 |
| Philadelphia Eagles | 6 | 6 | 0 | .500 | 4–6 | 254 | 141 | L4 |
| Chicago Cardinals | 5 | 7 | 0 | .417 | 3–6 | 233 | 287 | L1 |
| Washington Redskins | 3 | 9 | 0 | .250 | 1–8 | 232 | 326 | L1 |

Note: Tie games were not officially counted in the standings until 1972.

=== Game summaries ===
==== Week 1 (Sunday September 17, 1950): New York Giants ====
| | 1 | 2 | 3 | 4 | Total |
|---|---|---|---|---|---|
| Giants | 0 | 2 | 0 | 16 | 18 |
| Steelers | 0 | 0 | 7 | 0 | 7 |

at Forbes Field, Pittsburgh, Pennsylvania

- Game time: 2:00 pm
- Game weather: Clear, mid- to high-sixties
- Game attendance: 24,699
- Referee: John Glascott (University of Pennsylvania)
- Radio announcer: Joe Tucker (WPIT)
- TV announcer: not televised

Scoring Drives:

- New York Giants – Safety, Hartley tackled in end zone by Roberts
- Pittsburgh – Shipkey 1 run (Geri kick)
- New York Giants – Safety, punt snapped out of end zone
- New York Giants – Landry 37 fumble run (Poole kick)
- New York Giants – DeRogatis fumble recovery in end zone (Poole kick)

==== Week 2 (Sunday September 24, 1950): Detroit Lions ====
| | 1 | 2 | 3 | 4 | Total |
|---|---|---|---|---|---|
| Steelers | 0 | 0 | 7 | 0 | 7 |
| Lions | 0 | 0 | 0 | 10 | 10 |

at University of Detroit Stadium, Detroit, Michigan

- Game time: 2:00 pm
- Game weather: cold and dreary
- Game attendance: 18,707
- Referee: Yans Wallace
- Radio announcer: Joe Tucker (WPIT)
- TV announcer: not televised

Scoring Drives:

- Pittsburgh – Nickel 43 pass from Gage (Geri kick)
- Detroit – Walker 11 pass from Layne (Walker kick)
- Detroit – FG Walker 20

==== Week 3 (Sunday October 1, 1950): Washington Redskins ====
| | 1 | 2 | 3 | 4 | Total |
|---|---|---|---|---|---|
| Steelers | 3 | 7 | 7 | 9 | 26 |
| Redskins | 7 | 0 | 0 | 0 | 7 |

at Griffith Stadium, Washington, DC

- Game time: 2:00pm
- Game weather: Hot, sunny
- Game attendance: 25,008
- Referee: Sam Giangreco
- Radio announcer: Joe Tucker (WPIT)
- TV announcer: not televised

Scoring Drives:

- Washington – Taylor 70 pass from Gilmer (Dudley kick)
- Pittsburgh – FG Geri 40
- Pittsburgh – Gage 5 run (Geri kick)
- Pittsburgh – Nickel 28 pass from Geri (Geri kick)

==== Week 4 (Saturday October 7, 1950): Cleveland Browns ====
| | 1 | 2 | 3 | 4 | Total |
|---|---|---|---|---|---|
| Browns | 7 | 14 | 2 | 7 | 30 |
| Steelers | 3 | 0 | 7 | 7 | 17 |

at Forbes Field, Pittsburgh, Pennsylvania

- Game time: evening
- Game weather:
- Game attendance: 35,399
- Referee:
- TV announcers:

Scoring Drives:

- Pittsburgh – Geri 30-yard FG
- Cleveland – Graham 1 run (Groza kick)
- Cleveland – Graham 1 run (Groza kick)
- Cleveland – Jones 7 run (Groza kick)
- Cleveland – Safety, Chandnois tackled in end zone by Kissell
- Pittsburgh – Seabright 13 pass from Geri (Geri kick)
- Cleveland – Jones 48 run (Groza kick)
- Pittsburgh – Shipkey 1 run (Geri kick)

==== Week 5 (Sunday October 15, 1950): New York Giants ====
| | 1 | 2 | 3 | 4 | Total |
|---|---|---|---|---|---|
| Steelers | 7 | 3 | 0 | 7 | 17 |
| Giants | 0 | 0 | 6 | 0 | 6 |

at Polo Grounds, New York, New York

- Game time:
- Game weather:
- Game attendance: 21,725
- Referee:
- TV announcers:

Scoring Drives:

- Pittsburgh – Nickel 58 pass from Geri (Geri kick)
- Pittsburgh – FG Geri 21
- New York Giants – Scott 33 pass from Conerly (kick failed)
- Pittsburgh – Shipkey 1 run (Geri kick)

==== Week 6 (Sunday October 22, 1950): Philadelphia Eagles ====
| | 1 | 2 | 3 | 4 | Total |
|---|---|---|---|---|---|
| Eagles | 0 | 0 | 7 | 10 | 17 |
| Steelers | 0 | 0 | 10 | 0 | 10 |

at Forbes Field, Pittsburgh, Pennsylvania

- Game time: 2:00pm
- Game weather:
- Game attendance: 35,662
- Referee:
- TV announcers:

Scoring Drives:

- Philadelphia – Willey 41 interception (Patton kick)
- Pittsburgh – Rogel 64 pass from Geri (Geri kick)
- Pittsburgh – FG Geri 24
- Philadelphia – FG Patton 23
- Philadelphia – Van Buren 5 run (Patton kick)

==== Week 7 (Sunday October 29, 1950): Cleveland Browns ====
| | 1 | 2 | 3 | 4 | Total |
|---|---|---|---|---|---|
| Steelers | 0 | 0 | 0 | 7 | 7 |
| Browns | 7 | 10 | 14 | 14 | 45 |

at Cleveland Municipal Stadium, Cleveland, Ohio

- Game time:
- Game weather:
- Game attendance: 40,714
- Referee:
- TV announcers:

Scoring Drives:

- Cleveland – Graham 1 run (Groza kick)
- Cleveland – FG Groza 13
- Cleveland – Motley 33 pass from Graham (Groza kick)
- Cleveland – Motley 69 run (Groza kick)
- Cleveland – Phelps 14 run (Groza kick)
- Pittsburgh – Gage 29 pass from Gasparella (Geri kick)
- Cleveland – Jones 80 pass from Graham (Groza kick)
- Cleveland – Gillom 38 pass from Lewis (Groza kick)

==== Week 8 (Sunday November 5, 1950): Philadelphia Eagles ====
| | 1 | 2 | 3 | 4 | Total |
|---|---|---|---|---|---|
| Steelers | 3 | 3 | 3 | 0 | 9 |
| Eagles | 0 | 7 | 0 | 0 | 7 |

at Shibe Park, Philadelphia, Pennsylvania

- Game time:
- Game weather:
- Game attendance: 24,629
- Referee:
- TV announcers:

Scoring Drives:

- Pittsburgh – FG Geri 11
- Philadelphia – Van Buren 1 run (Patton kick)
- Pittsburgh – FG Geri 36
- Pittsburgh – FG Geri 13

==== Week 9 (Sunday November 12, 1950): Baltimore Colts ====
| | 1 | 2 | 3 | 4 | Total |
|---|---|---|---|---|---|
| Colts | 0 | 0 | 7 | 0 | 7 |
| Steelers | 10 | 7 | 0 | 0 | 17 |

at Forbes Field, Pittsburgh, Pennsylvania

- Game time:
- Game weather:
- Game attendance: 24,141
- Referee:
- TV announcers:

Scoring Drives:

- Pittsburgh – FG Geri 37
- PIttsburgh – Rogel 15 run (Geri kick)
- Pittsburgh – Gage 1 run (Geri kick)
- Baltimore – Spaniel 15 run (Grossman kick)

==== Week 11 (Thursday November 23, 1950): Chicago Cardinals ====
| | 1 | 2 | 3 | 4 | Total |
|---|---|---|---|---|---|
| Steelers | 7 | 7 | 7 | 7 | 28 |
| Cardinals | 3 | 0 | 0 | 14 | 17 |

at Comiskey Park, Chicago, Illinois

- Game time:
- Game weather:
- Game attendance: 11,622
- Referee:
- TV announcers:

Scoring Drives:

- Pittsburgh – Geri 5 run (Geri kick)
- Chicago Cardinals – FG Harder 18
- Pittsburgh – Geri 4 run (Geri kick)
- Pittsburgh – Nuzum 1 run (Geri kick)
- Pittsburgh – Gage 13 run (Geri kick)
- Chicago Cardinals – Shaw 45 pass from Hardy (Harder kick)
- Chicago Cardinals – Polsfoot 22 pass from Hardy (Harder kick)

==== Week 12 (Sunday December 3, 1950): Washington Redskins ====
| | 1 | 2 | 3 | 4 | Total |
|---|---|---|---|---|---|
| Redskins | 7 | 10 | 0 | 7 | 24 |
| Steelers | 0 | 0 | 0 | 7 | 7 |

at Forbes Field, Pittsburgh, Pennsylvania

- Game time:
- Game weather:
- Game attendance: 19,741
- Referee:
- TV announcers:

Scoring Drives:

- Washington – Dudley 96 punt return (Dudley kick)
- Washington – Saenz 34 pass from Baugh (Dudley kick)
- Washington – FG Dudley 15
- Washington – Goode 5 run (Dudley kick)
- Pittsburgh – Nickel 65 pass from Geri (Geri kick)

==== Week 13 (Sunday December 10, 1950): Chicago Cardinals ====
| | 1 | 2 | 3 | 4 | Total |
|---|---|---|---|---|---|
| Cardinals | 7 | 0 | 0 | 0 | 7 |
| Steelers | 0 | 14 | 7 | 7 | 28 |

at Forbes Field, Pittsburgh, Pennsylvania

- Game time:
- Game weather:
- Game attendance: 18,301
- Referee:
- TV announcers:

Scoring Drives:

- Chicago Cardinals – Shaw 7 pass from Hardy (Harder kick)
- Pittsburgh – Rogel 40 run (Geri kick)
- Pittsburgh – Geri 33 pass from Gasparella (Geri kick)
- Pittsburgh – Nuzum 10 lateral from Nickel after 68 pass from Geri (Geri kick)
- Pittsburgh – Gage 48 pass from Gasparella (Geri kick)

== Roster ==
1950 Pittsburgh Steelers final roster
| Backs: 56 Bob Balog LB; 14 Lynn Chandnois RB; 7 Jim Finks CB/RB; 77 Bobby Gage RB/CB/S; 48 Joe Gasparella RB; 35 Joe Geri RB/K/P; 11 Howard Hartley CB/RB; 42 Joe Hollingsworth LB/FB; 44 Shorty McWilliams S/P/RB; 22 Jerry Nuzum RB; 27 Fran Rogel FB; 66 Don Samuel RB/CB; 33 Charley Seabright FB; 49 Jerry Shipkey LB/FB; 57 Frank Sinkovitz LB; 30 Truett Smith RB; Receivers: 54 Val Jansante; 81 Elbie Nickel | Linemen: 65 Lou Allen T; 28 Bob Davis DE; 80 George Hays DE; 73 Darrell Hogan DG; 40 George Hughes G; 37 Bill McPeak DE; 55 Charley Mehelich DE/WR; 88 George Nicksich DG; 86 Carl Samuelson DT/T; 63 Ernie Stautner DT; 89 Walt Szot DT; 62 Dick Tomlinson G; 46 Bill Walsh C; 75 Jack Wiley DT/T; 79 Frank Wydo T/DT; Rookies in italics |
