= Jack Jennings (American football) =

American football player (1927–1993)

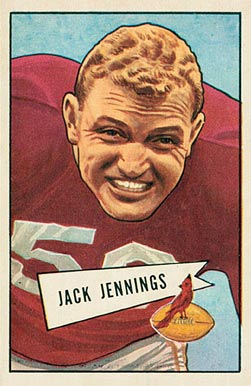
- Jennings on a 1952 Bowman football card

No. 9, 50, 70, 65
- Position: Offensive tackle

Personal information
- Born: February 23, 1926; Columbus, Ohio, U.S.
- Died: June 11, 1993 (aged 67); Rocky River, Ohio, U.S.
- Listed height: 6 ft 4 in (1.93 m)
- Listed weight: 245 lb (111 kg)

Career information
- High school: North High School
- College: Ohio State
- NFL draft: 1950: 2nd round, 21st overall pick

Career history
- Chicago Cardinals (1950–1957)

Career NFL statistics
- Games played: 90
- Games started: 87
- Fumble recoveries: 2
- Stats at Pro Football Reference

Jack Weldon Jennings (February 23, 1927 – June 11, 1993) was an American professional football player who was an offensive lineman for eight seasons for the Chicago Cardinals.
