= Floyd Jaszewski =

American football player (1927–2010)

No. 72
- Position: Offensive tackle

Personal information
- Born: June 5, 1927; Minneapolis, Minnesota, U.S.
- Died: April 17, 2010 (aged 82); Cape Coral, Florida, U.S.
- Listed height: 6 ft 4 in (1.93 m)
- Listed weight: 230 lb (104 kg)

Career information
- High school: Edison (Minneapolis)
- College: Minnesota (1946–1949)
- NFL draft: 1950: 6th round, 70th overall pick

Career history
- Detroit Lions (1950–1951)

Career NFL statistics
- Games played: 24
- Games started: 17
- Fumble recoveries: 3
- Stats at Pro Football Reference

Floyd Roman Jaszewski (June 5, 1927 – April 17, 2010) was an American professional football tackle. He played for the Detroit Lions from 1950 to 1951.

He died on April 17, 2010, in Cape Coral, Florida at age 82.
