= Toy Ledbetter =

American football player (1927–1995)

Toy W. Ledbetter
No. 21, 25
- Position: Halfback

Personal information
- Born: October 30, 1927; Morris, Oklahoma, U.S.
- Died: July 25, 1995 (aged 67); Denver, Colorado, U.S.
- Listed height: 5 ft 10 in (1.78 m)
- Listed weight: 198 lb (90 kg)

Career information
- High school: Durant (Durant, Oklahoma)
- College: Oklahoma State
- NFL draft: 1950: undrafted

Career history
- Philadelphia Eagles (1950, 1953–1955)

Career NFL statistics
- Rushing yards: 729
- Rushing average: 3.5
- Receptions: 39
- Receiving yards: 498
- Total touchdowns: 11
- Stats at Pro Football Reference

Toy Willie Ledbetter (October 30, 1927 – July 25, 1995) was an American professional football player who was a running back for four seasons for the Philadelphia Eagles.
