= 1950 Los Angeles Rams season =

NFL team season

- Head coach: Joe Stydahar
- Home stadium: Los Angeles Memorial Coliseum

Results
- Record: 9–3
- Division place: 1st NFL National
- Playoffs: Won Conference Playoff (vs. Bears) 24–14; Lost NFL Championship (at Browns) 28–30
- Pro Bowlers: QB Norm Van Brocklin; FS Woodley Lewis; HB Glenn Davis; DE Larry Brink; QB Bob Waterfield; FB Dick Hoerner; DT Dick Huffman; E Tom Fears

Uniform
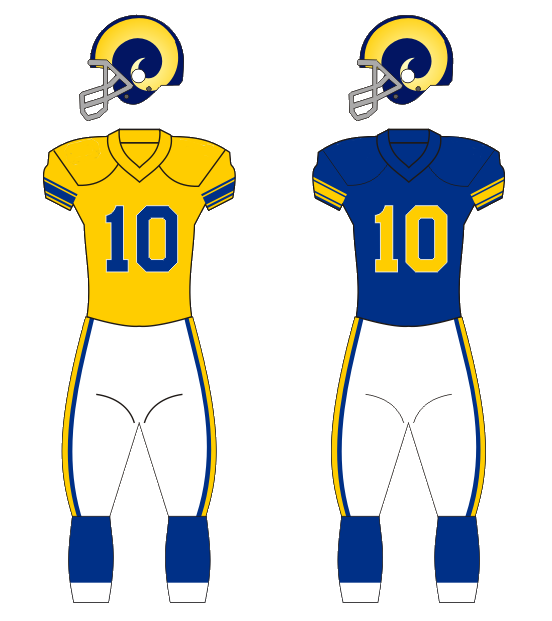

The 1950 Los Angeles Rams season was the team's 13th year with the National Football League and the fifth season in Los Angeles.

The 1950 Rams hold the NFL's all-time record for average points per game, scoring 38.8 points per contest. They also hold the record for most points in a three-game span, with 165 points between October 15 and 29. They are the only team in modern NFL history to score 60-or-more points twice in a season. They did so in consecutive games, in Weeks Six (70) and Seven (65).

Los Angeles's 466 points scored in 1950 are the most scored by any team in the 1950s, and more than 70 points more than the next-closest team (which is, incidentally, the 1951 Rams). In the 1951 Pro Bowl, the first all-star game for the league in nine years, the Rams tied for the most selections with eight players.

== Before the season ==
=== Draft ===
1950 Los Angeles Rams draft
Round	Pick	Player	Position	College	Notes
1	9	Ralph Pasquariello	FB	Villanova	
1	12	Stan West *	G	Oklahoma	
2	25	Bob Fuchs	C	Missouri	
3	38	Don Murray	T	Penn State	
4	51	Ben Procter	E	Texas	
5	64	Dick McKissack	DB	SMU	
6	77	Orville Langrell	T	Oklahoma City	
7	90	Cliff Coggin	E	Mississippi Southern	
8	103	Woodley Lewis	DB	Oregon	
9	116	Les Cowan	DT	McMurry	
10	129	Jay Van Noy	B	Utah State	
11	137	Jay Roundy	B	USC	
11	142	Fred Stuveck	G	West Virginia	
12	155	John Lunny	G	Arkansas	
13	168	Tom Winbigler	B	College of Idaho	
14	181	Bill Trautwein	T	Ohio State	Returned to Ohio State
15	194	Dave Stephenson	G	West Virginia	
16	207	Jim Maloney	E	Fordham	
17	220	Harry Neugold	T	RPI	
18	233	Bobby Collier	T	SMU	Played for Rams in 1951
19	246	Johnny Smith	E	Arizona	
20	259	Bill Young	B	Hillsdale	
21	272	Bill Klein	E	Hanover	
22	285	Doug Barber	B	Dakota Wesleyan	
23	298	Jim Bird	T	USC	
24	311	Joe Joiner	E	Austin	
25	324	Dan Towler *	FB	Washington & Jefferson	
26	337	Otto Haldy	T	Mankato State	
27	350	Hal Kilman	T	TCU	
28	363	Junior Morgan	E	San Jose State	
29	376	Bob Heck	B	Pacific	
30	389	Bill Lange	G	Dayton	Played with Rams 1951–52
Made roster * Made at least one Pro Bowl during career

== Regular season ==
=== Schedule ===
Game	Date	Opponent	Result	Record	Venue	Attendance	Recap	Sources
1	September 17	**Chicago Bears**	**L** 20–24	0–1	L.A. Memorial Coliseum	21,000	Recap	
2	September 22	**New York Yanks**	**W** 45–28	1–1	L.A. Memorial Coliseum	23,768	Recap	
3	October 1	at **San Francisco 49ers**	**W** 35–14	2–1	Kezar Stadium	27,262	Recap	
4	October 7	at Philadelphia Eagles	**L** 20–56	2–2	Shibe Park	24,134	Recap	
5	October 15	at **Detroit Lions**	**W** 30–28	3–2	Briggs Stadium	35,589	Recap	
6	October 22	**Baltimore Colts**	**W** 70–27	4–2	L.A. Memorial Coliseum	16,026	Recap	
7	October 29	**Detroit Lions**	**W** 65–24	5–2	L.A. Memorial Coliseum	27,475	Recap	
8	November 5	**San Francisco 49ers**	**W** 28–21	6–2	L.A. Memorial Coliseum	33,234	Recap	
9	November 12	at **Green Bay Packers**	**W** 45–14	7–2	Wisconsin State Fair Park	20,456	Recap	
10	November 19	at **New York Yanks**	**W** 43–35	8–2	Yankee Stadium	42,673	Recap	
11	November 26	at **Chicago Bears**	**L** 14–24	8–3	Wrigley Field	43,678	Recap	
12	December 3	**Green Bay Packers**	**W** 51–14	9–3	L.A. Memorial Coliseum	39,323	Recap	
Note: Intra-conference opponents are in **bold** text.

=== Standings ===
Program for the September 22 game against the New York Yanks.

NFL National Conference
	W	L	T	PCT	CONF	PF	PA	STK
Los Angeles Rams	9	3	0	.750	9–2	466	309	W1
Chicago Bears	9	3	0	.750	8–2	279	207	W1
New York Yanks	7	5	0	.583	7–4	366	367	W1
Detroit Lions	6	6	0	.500	5–6	321	285	L1
San Francisco 49ers	3	9	0	.250	3–8	213	300	W1
Green Bay Packers	3	9	0	.250	2–9	244	406	L2
Baltimore Colts	1	11	0	.083	1–4	213	462	L5

Note: Tie games were not officially counted in the standings until 1972.

== Playoffs ==
Round	Date	Opponent	Result	Venue	Attendance	Recap
Conference	December 17	Chicago Bears	W 24–14	Los Angeles Memorial Coliseum	83,501	Recap
NFL Championship	December 24	at Cleveland Browns	L 28–30	Cleveland Stadium	29,751	Recap

== Roster ==
1950 Los Angeles Rams roster
Quarterbacks: 25 Norm Van Brocklin P; 7 Bob Waterfield K/P; Running backs: 9 Paul Barry; 41 Glenn Davis; 31 Dick Hoerner; 24 Tommy Kalmanir; 36 Ralph Pasquariello; 77 Vitamin Smith; 32 Dan Towler; Receivers: 80 Bob Boyd; 55 Tom Fears; 40 Elroy Hirsch CB	Linemen/Linebackers: 66 Gil Bouley DT/T; 63 Larry Brink DE; 86 Ed Champagne T/MG; 58 Jack Finlay G; 20 Dick Huffman DT/T; 27 Milan Lazetich G/MG; 22 Fred Naumetz MLB/C; 57 Don Paul OLB; 45 Bob Reinhard T/DT; 79 Bill Smyth DE/WR; 21 Art Statuto C; 34 Dave Stephenson G; 44 Harry Thompson G; 35 Vic Vasicek G/OLB; 11 Stan West MG; 13 Tank Younger OLB/FB; 56 Jack Zilly DE	Defensive backs: 30 Woodley Lewis CB; 10 Tom Keane CB/WR; 33 Jerry Williams S/RB; Reserve lists: -- Bill Lange G (Military); -- Dick McKissack LB (DNR); 17 George Sims CB (Military); -- Bobby Thomason QB (Retired); rookies in italics
