= Joe Bartos =

American football player (1926–1989)

No. 27
- Positions: Halfback, defensive back

Personal information
- Born: November 18, 1926; Lorain, Ohio, U.S.
- Died: March 11, 1989 (aged 62); Bridgeport, Connecticut, U.S.
- Listed height: 6 ft 2 in (1.88 m)
- Listed weight: 194 lb (88 kg)

Career information
- High school: Lorain (OH)
- College: Navy

Career history
- Washington Redskins (1950)

Career statistics
- Games played: 12
- Stats at Pro Football Reference

Joseph Stephen Bartos Jr. (November 18, 1926 – March 11, 1989) was an American professional football halfback and defensive back in the National Football League (NFL) for the Washington Redskins. In his later career, he was an aerospace engineer and defense industry executive based in Connecticut.

== Early life, education, and football ==
Bartos was born in Lorain, Ohio, the son of Joseph Bartos and Anna Elizabeth Murin Bartos. He played college football at the United States Naval Academy. where he earned a bachelor's degree in 1947. He played one season of professional football, as a member of the 1950 Washington Redskins. He left the Redskins to serve in the Korean War. After the war he attended the University of Maryland for graduate studies in mathematics and financial management. He was decorated with a Silver Star and a Purple Heart for his service in Korea.

== Career ==
Bartos was an electrical engineer who did research at the Washington Navy Yard and the Naval Ordnance Laboratory From 1958 to 1963 he worked at Space Technology Laboratories in Redondo Beach, California, on ICBM systems. In 1959 he received the Navy's Meritorious Civilian Service Award for his engineering work. He was an executive of the aerospace corporation Avco beginning in 1963, and was based at the company's Greenwich, Connecticut, headquarters from 1980.

Bartos was a member of the American Defense Preparedness Association and the Washington Redskins Alumni Association. He was president and board member of the Boys' Club of Bridgeport, Connecticut, and active in other civic groups.

== Personal life ==
Bartos married Marjorie Phillips and had four children. He died in 1989, at the age of 62, in Bridgeport, Connecticut.
