= Jerry Houghton =

American football player (1926–2002)

No. 71, 15
- Positions: Offensive tackle, linebacker

Personal information
- Born: April 18, 1926; Yakima, Washington, U.S.
- Died: June 1, 2002 (aged 76); Bellevue, Washington, U.S.
- Listed height: 6 ft 2 in (1.88 m)
- Listed weight: 226 lb (103 kg)

Career information
- High school: Zillah (Zillah, Washington)
- College: Washington State
- NFL draft: 1950: 7th round, 84th overall pick

Career history
- Washington Redskins (1950); Chicago Cardinals (1951)

Career NFL statistics
- Games played: 14
- Fumble recoveries: 1
- Stats at Pro Football Reference

Gerald Haines Houghton (April 18, 1926 – June 1, 2002) was an American professional football offensive tackle in the National Football League (NFL) for the Washington Redskins and Chicago Cardinals. He played college football at Washington State University and was selected 84th overall by the Redskins in the seventh round of the 1950 NFL draft.
