= Tom Finnin =

American football player (1927–2003)

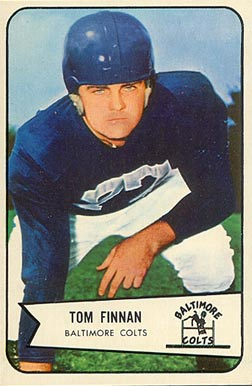
- Finnin on a 1954 Bowman football card

No. 77, 76, 71
- Position: Defensive tackle

Personal information
- Born: September 28, 1927; Chicago, Illinois, U.S.
- Died: June 22, 2003 (aged 75); Chicago, Illinois, U.S.
- Listed height: 6 ft 2 in (1.88 m)
- Listed weight: 262 lb (119 kg)

Career information
- High school: St. Augustine High School; St. Ignatius College Prep
- College: Detroit Mercy
- NFL draft: 1950: 24th round, 306th overall pick

Career history
- Baltimore Colts (1953–1956); Chicago Cardinals (1957); Green Bay Packers (1957)

Career NFL statistics
- Games played: 55
- Games started: 47
- Fumble recoveries: 2
- Stats at Pro Football Reference

Thomas R. Finnin (September 28, 1927 – June 22, 2003) was an American professional football defensive tackle in the National Football League (NFL).

== Biography ==
Finnin was born on September 28, 1927, in Chicago, Illinois.

== Career ==
Finnin was drafted in the 24th round of the 1950 NFL draft by the New York Giants. He would later play four seasons with the Baltimore Colts before splitting his final season with the Chicago Cardinals and Green Bay Packers. He played at the collegiate level at the University of Detroit Mercy.

== Later life ==
After being drafted by New York, Finnin went on to serve in the Korean War. When he returned from Korea he was traded to the Baltimore Colts. During his time at Baltimore he became a Chicago police officer in the off season. He continued his police career to become a 33-year veteran of the Chicago Police. Finnin died at the age of 75 on June 22, 2003.
