= Les Cowan =

American football player (1925–1979)

No. 89
- Positions: Defensive tackle, defensive end

Personal information
- Born: December 24, 1925; Stamford, Texas, U.S.
- Died: March 9, 1979 (aged 53); Weatherford, Texas, U.S.
- Listed height: 6 ft 5 in (1.96 m)
- Listed weight: 235 lb (107 kg)

Career information
- High school: Hamlin (Hamlin, Texas)
- College: McMurry
- NFL draft: 1950: 9th round, 116th overall pick

Career history
- Chicago Bears (1951)

Career NFL statistics
- Fumble recoveries: 2
- Stats at Pro Football Reference

Les Cowan (December 24, 1925 – March 9, 1979) was an American professional football defensive tackle and defensive end. He was selected by the Los Angeles Rams in the ninth round (116th overall) of the 1950 NFL draft. He played for the Chicago Bears in 1951.
