= Ernie Johnson (American football) =

American football and rugby player (1926–2010)

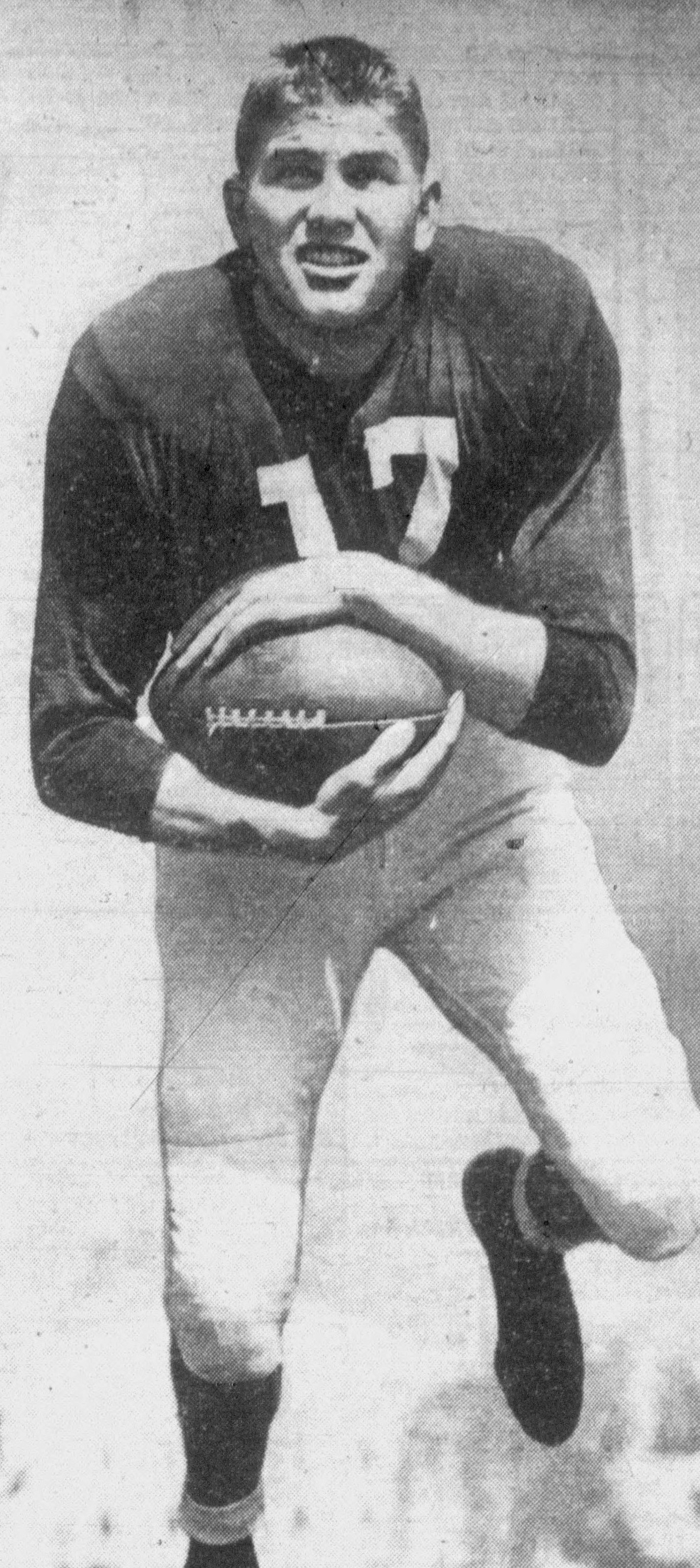
- Born: Ernest Cowan Johnson; January 29, 1926; Berkeley, California, U.S.
- Died: June 13, 2010 (aged 84); Sacramento, California, U.S.
- Education: UCLA
- Known for: American football, basketball, rugby

Ernest Cowan Johnson (January 29, 1926 – June 13, 2010) was an American college football and college basketball player. He was four-letter football player at the University of California, Los Angeles (UCLA) from 1946 to 1949. As a running back, he led the team in scoring during his first season. His final season was the first of head coach Red Sanders, who made Johnson the single-wing tailback. As at UCLA, Johnson played basketball under coach John Wooden from 1948 to 1950 seasons and also played rugby. He was selected by the Philadelphia Eagles in the 1950 NFL draft, but never played in the National Football League (NFL).

In 1999, Johnson was inducted into the UCLA Athletics Hall of Fame.
