= Frank Spaniel =

American football player (1928–1994)

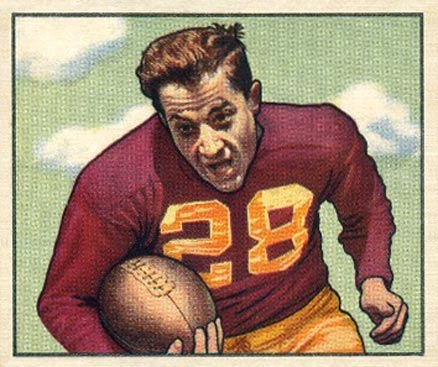
- Spaniel on a 1950 Bowman football card

No. 26, 83, 85
- Position: Halfback

Personal information
- Born: May 21, 1928; Vandergrift, Pennsylvania, U.S.
- Died: October 25, 1994 (aged 66); Vandergrift, Pennsylvania, U.S.
- Listed height: 5 ft 10 in (1.78 m)
- Listed weight: 185 lb (84 kg)

Career information
- College: Notre Dame
- NFL draft: 1950: 5th round, 58th overall pick

Career history
- Washington Redskins (1950); Baltimore Colts (1950)

Awards and highlights
- 2× National champion (1947, 1949)

Career NFL statistics
- Rushing yards: 22
- Rushing average: 1.5
- Receptions: 5
- Receiving yards: 84
- Total touchdowns: 2
- Stats at Pro Football Reference

Francis James Spaniel Jr. (May 21, 1928 – October 25, 1994) was an American professional football halfback in the National Football League (NFL) for the Baltimore Colts and the Washington Redskins. He played college football at the University of Notre Dame and was drafted in the fifth round of the 1950 NFL draft.

== College career ==
In his senior season at Notre Dame, Spaniel amassed 496 yards and 6.2 yards per carry as he helped the Fighting Irish win the 1949 national championship.
