= Don Narrell =

American gridiron football player (1928–2016)

Profile
- Position: Tackle

Personal information
- Born: December 27, 1928; Mitchell County, Texas, U.S.
- Died: April 3, 2016 (aged 87); Lubbock, Texas, U.S.
- Listed height: 6 ft 5 in (1.96 m)
- Listed weight: 245 lb (111 kg)

Career information
- High school: Loraine (TX)
- College: Texas Christian
- NFL draft: 1950: 7th round, 81st overall pick

Career history
- 1950: Edmonton Eskimos

Douglas Narrell (December 27, 1928 – April 3, 2016) was an American professional football player who played for the Edmonton Eskimos. He previously college football at Texas Christian University.
