= Dan Brown (American football) =

American football player (1925–1995)

No. 81
- Position: Defensive end

Personal information
- Born: August 26, 1925; Philadelphia, Pennsylvania, U.S.
- Died: June 17, 1995 (aged 69); Havertown, Pennsylvania, U.S.
- Listed height: 6 ft 1 in (1.85 m)
- Listed weight: 200 lb (91 kg)

Career information
- High school: West Catholic (Philadelphia)
- College: Villanova
- NFL draft: 1950: 11th round, 136th overall pick

Career history
- Washington Redskins (1950)

Career NFL statistics
- Fumble recoveries: 1
- Stats at Pro Football Reference

Daniel Joseph Brown (August 26, 1925 – June 17, 1995) was an American professional football defensive end in the National Football League (NFL) for the Washington Redskins. He played college football at Villanova University and was drafted in the eleventh round of the 1950 NFL draft.
