= 1950 Baltimore Colts season =

National Football League team season

1950 Baltimore Colts (1947–1950) season
- Head coach: Clem Crowe
- Home stadium: Baltimore Municipal Stadium

Results
- Record: 1–11
- Division place: 13th NFL
- Playoffs: Did not qualify

The 1950 Baltimore Colts season was their fifth and final season as a professional football franchise, their fourth in Baltimore, and their only season in the National Football League.

As the "odd" 13th team in the league, the 1950 Colts did not play home-and-away games with all their conference rivals, as did the rest of the league, but rather played one game each against the entire league — with the exception they did not play the Chicago Bears, in favor of home-and-away contests against the Washington Redskins, their geographically closest rival. This change allowed the two Chicago teams to continue to develop their own local rivalry with similar home-and-away games.

After falling to defeat seven consecutive times in the preseason, the 1950 Colts matched their previous season's record of 1–11, failing to qualify for the playoffs for the second consecutive year.

The 1950 Colts hold the dubious distinction of being the only team in NFL history to allow more than 50 points in four different games in a single season. The 462 points (38.5 points-per-game) the Colts surrendered is the most of any NFL team in the decade of the 1950s. In their Week 6 loss to the Rams, the Colts became one of only three teams in NFL history to surrender 70 or more points in a regular season contest.

The Baltimore Colts returned to the NFL in 1953.

== Preseason games ==
Game	Date	Opponent	Result	Venue	Attendance	Source
0	August 8	Intersquad game		Baltimore Memorial Stadium		
1	August 13	Pittsburgh Steelers	L 27–30	Baltimore Memorial Stadium	26,000	
2	August 19	at Cleveland Browns	L 7–34	Nippert Stadium (Cincinnati)	21,500	
3	August 24	Chicago Bears	L 17–21	Baltimore Memorial Stadium	17,000	
4	August 30	San Francisco 49ers	L 14–27	Baltimore Memorial Stadium	6,000	
5	September 2	at Los Angeles Rams	L 21–70	Alamo Stadium (San Antonio)	16,380	
6	September 4	at New York Yanks	L 17–42	Fairgrounds Stadium (Shreveport, LA)	22,500	
7	September 10	at Green Bay Packers	L 14–16	Wisconsin State Fair Park (Milwaukee)	17,191	

== Schedule ==
Week	Date	Opponent	Result	Record	Venue	Attendance	Recap	Sources
1	September 17	Washington Redskins	**L** 14–38	0–1	Baltimore Memorial Stadium	26,267	Recap	
2	September 24	Cleveland Browns	**L** 0–31	0–2	Baltimore Memorial Stadium	15,201	Recap	
3	October 2	at Chicago Cardinals	**L** 13–55	0–3	Comiskey Park	14,439	Recap	
4	Bye							
5	October 15	Philadelphia Eagles	**L** 14–24	0–4	Baltimore Memorial Stadium	14,413	Recap	
6	October 22	at **Los Angeles Rams**	**L** 27–70	0–5	Los Angeles Memorial Coliseum	16,025	Recap	
7	October 29	at **San Francisco 49ers**	**L** 14–17	0–6	Kezar Stadium	14,800	Recap	
8	November 5	**Green Bay Packers**	**W** 41–21	1–6	Baltimore Memorial Stadium	12,981	Recap	
9	November 12	at Pittsburgh Steelers	**L** 7–17	1–7	Forbes Field	24,141	Recap	
10	November 19	New York Giants	**L** 20–55	1–8	Baltimore Memorial Stadium	14,573	Recap	
11	November 26	at Washington Redskins	**L** 28–38	1–9	Griffith Stadium	21,275	Recap	
12	December 3	**Detroit Lions**	**L** 21–45	1–10	Baltimore Memorial Stadium	12,058	Recap	
13	December 10	at **New York Yanks**	**L** 14–51	1–11	Yankee Stadium	6,836	Recap	
Note: Intra-conference opponents are in **bold** text.

== Standings ==
Program for the October 15 game against the visiting Philadelphia Eagles.

NFL National Conference
	W	L	T	PCT	CONF	PF	PA	STK
Los Angeles Rams	9	3	0	.750	9–2	466	309	W1
Chicago Bears	9	3	0	.750	8–2	279	207	W1
New York Yanks	7	5	0	.583	7–4	366	367	W1
Detroit Lions	6	6	0	.500	5–6	321	285	L1
San Francisco 49ers	3	9	0	.250	3–8	213	300	W1
Green Bay Packers	3	9	0	.250	2–9	244	406	L2
Baltimore Colts	1	11	0	.083	1–4	213	462	L5

Note: Tie games were not officially counted in the standings until 1972.

== Coaching staff ==
- Head coach: Clem Crowe
- Backfield coach: Joel Hunt
- End coach: Wayne Millner
- Line coach: Rocco Pirro

== Roster ==
Quarterbacks

- 63 Y. A. Tittle
- 68 Adrian Burk P

Running backs

- 88 Rip Collins CB
- 81 Chet Mutryn
- 83 Frank Spaniel
- 76 Jim Spavital

Receivers

- 56 Hal Crisler
- 55 Johnny North
- 51 Paul Salata

Offensive lineman

- 41 Ernie Blandin T
- 33 Ken Cooper G/MG
- 35 Barry French T/DT
- 30 Earl Murray G/T
- 37 John Schweder G
- 22 Joel Williams C

Defensive lineman

- 32 Sisto Averno MG/G
- 45 Don Colo DT/T
- 49 Art Donovan DT
- 54 Bob Jensen DE
- 57 Bob Oristaglio DE/WR

Linebackers

- 73 Hardy Brown MLB
- 77 George Buksar OLB/FB
- 34 Ed King MLB/OLB
- 72 Veto Kissell OLB/FB/K

Defensive backs

- 86 Bob Livingstone S/RB
- 80 Chick Maggioli CB
- 87 Herb Rich CB
- 82 Billy Stone CB/RB
- 89 Ernie Zalejski S/RB

Reserve list

- 78 Leon Campbell FB (IR)
- 52 Bob Nowaskey LB (IR)
- 59 Jim Owens WR/DE (IR)
- 53 Art Spinney WR (Military)

rookies in italics

Baltimore Memorial Stadium with its faintly chalked lines over a dirt baseball infield — a far cry from a modern NFL stadium. Opening day, 1950. The crowd of 26,267 would be the largest of the year for the money-losing first Colts franchise.
