= Charlie Conerly =

American football player (1921–1996)

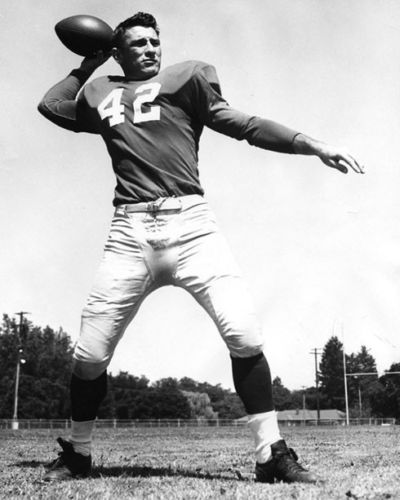
- Conerly with the New York Giants in 1948

No. 42
- Position: Quarterback

Personal information
- Born: September 19, 1921; Clarksdale, Mississippi, U.S.
- Died: February 13, 1996 (aged 74); Memphis, Tennessee, U.S.
- Listed height: 6 ft 1 in (1.85 m)
- Listed weight: 185 lb (84 kg)

Career information
- High school: Clarksdale
- College: Ole Miss (1942, 1946–1947)
- NFL draft: 1945: 13th round, 127th overall pick

Career history
- New York Giants (1948–1961)

Awards and highlights
- NFL champion (1956); NFL MVP – NEA (1959); 2× Second-team All-Pro (1956, 1959); 2× Pro Bowl (1950, 1956); NFL passer rating leader (1959); New York Giants Ring of Honor; New York Giants No. 42 retired; 13th greatest New York Giant of all-time; Consensus All-American (1947); SEC Player of the Year (1947); 2× First-team All-SEC (1946, 1947)

Career NFL statistics
- Passing attempts: 2,833
- Passing completions: 1,418
- Completion percentage: 50.1%
- TD–INT: 173–167
- Passing yards: 19,488
- Passer rating: 68.2
- Stats at Pro Football Reference
- College Football Hall of Fame

Charles Albert Conerly Jr. (September 19, 1921 – February 13, 1996) was an American professional football player who was a quarterback in the National Football League (NFL) for the New York Giants from 1948 through 1961. Conerly played college football for the Ole Miss Rebels and was inducted into the College Football Hall of Fame in 1966. He was married to Perian Conerly, a sports columnist for The New York Times.

== College career ==
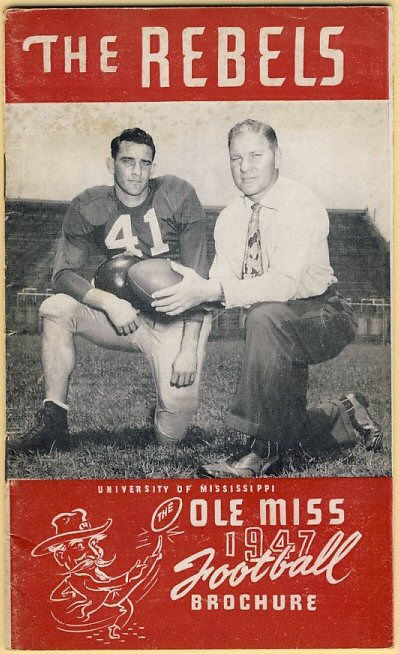
1947 Ole Miss media guide featuring Charlie Conerly (left) and coach Johnny Vaught (right).

Conerly attended and played college football at the University of Mississippi (Ole Miss). He started at Ole Miss in 1942, but left to serve as a Marine in the South Pacific during World War II where he fought in the Battle of Guam.

He returned to Mississippi in 1946 and led the team to their first Southeastern Conference (SEC) championship in 1947. During that season, he led the nation in pass completions with 133, rushed for nine touchdowns and passed for 18 more, was a consensus All-American selection, and was named Player of the Year by the Helms Athletic Foundation. As an outstanding quarterback playing for the Rebels, Conerly earned consensus All-America recognition in 1947 when he led the Rebels to a record of 9–2, including a 13–9 win over TCU in the Delta Bowl at Crump Stadium in Memphis, Tennessee.

Conerly's 1947 squad had upset wins over Kentucky (14–7 in Oxford), Florida (14–6 in Jacksonville, Florida), LSU (20–18 in Baton Rouge), and Tennessee (43–13 in Memphis). He placed fourth in the Heisman Trophy balloting and was a two-time All SEC performer. He was named Player of the Year and Back of the Year of the SEC in 1947. He set numerous school records and still ranked 12th in 2008 in career total offense with 3,076 yards. He was ranked 12th in career passing with 2,313 yards and 26 TDs.

Conerly also played baseball at Ole Miss, where he hit .467 in 1948 and was offered a professional contract.

== Professional career ==
Conerly was drafted in the 13th round of the 1945 NFL draft by the Washington Redskins. He played his entire career with the New York Giants as a quarterback, where he was a two-time Pro Bowl selection in 1950 and 1956 and was NFL's Most Valuable Player in 1959 by the Newspaper Enterprise Association. Conerly was named NFL "Rookie of the Year" in 1948, a season when he set many Giants rookie franchise records that still stand. He led the Giants to three NFL Championship games in four seasons (1956, 1958–1959), including a 47–7 victory over the Chicago Bears in the 1956 NFL Championship Game. During his professional career, he earned the alliterative nickname "Chucking Charlie Conerly".

=== Giants franchise records ===
As of 2017's NFL off-season, Charlie Conerly held at least 10 Giants franchise records, including:

- Most completions (rookie season): 162 (1948)
- Most pass attempts (rookie season): 299 (1948)
- Most passing yards (rookie season): 2,175 (1948)
- Most passing touchdowns (rookie season): 22 (1948)
- Most intercepted (game): 5 (1951-10-14 CRD and 1953-12-13 DET; tied with Jeff Rutledge and Eli Manning)
- Highest passer rating (rookie season): 84.0 (1948)
- Most yards/pass attempt (season): 8.79 (1959)
- Most yards/pass attempt (playoff career): 8.53
- Most yards/pass attempt (playoff season): 10.48 (1958)
- Most passing yards/game (rookie season): 181.3 (1948)
- Most passing touchdowns by a quarterback vs. The Washington Redskins/Football Team/Commanders

=== NFL career statistics ===
Legend
	NEA NFL MVP
	Won NFL championship
	Led the league
**Bold**	Career high

Year	Team	Games			Passing								
Year	Team	GP	GS	Record	Cmp	Att	Pct	Yds	Avg	TD	Int	Lng	Rtg
1948	NYG	12	4	−	**162**	299	54.2	**2,175**	7.3	**22**	13	65	84.0
1949	NYG	12	12	6−6	152	**305**	49.8	2,138	7.0	17	20	**85**	64.1
1950	NYG	11	8	6−2	56	132	42.4	1,000	7.6	8	7	43	67.1
1951	NYG	12	11	9−2	93	189	49.2	1,277	6.8	10	22	69	49.3
1952	NYG	11	11	7−4	82	169	48.5	1,090	6.4	13	10	70	70.4
1953	NYG	12	11	3−8	143	303	47.2	1,711	5.6	13	**25**	60	44.9
1954	NYG	10	10	6−4	103	210	49.0	1,439	6.9	17	11	68	76.7
1955	NYG	12	4	1−3	98	202	48.5	1,310	6.5	13	13	71	64.2
1956	NYG	12	0	−	90	174	51.7	1,143	6.6	10	7	48	75.0
1957	NYG	12	8	6–2	128	232	55.2	1,712	7.4	11	11	70	74.9
1958	NYG	10	6	4–2	88	184	47.8	1,199	6.5	10	9	44	66.8
1959	NYG	10	9	**8–1**	113	194	**58.2**	1,706	**8.8**	14	4	77	**102.7**
1960	NYG	12	7	5–1–1	66	134	49.3	954	7.1	8	7	70	70.9
1961	NYG	**13**	4	2–2	44	106	41.5	634	6.0	7	8	37	52.2
Career		161	105	63–37–1	1,418	2,833	50.1	19,488	6.9	173	167	85	68.2

== Later life and honors ==
Conerly portrayed the "Marlboro Man" in commercials after playing for the Giants. Conerly and his wife, Perian (author of the book, Backseat Quarterback) retired to his hometown of Clarksdale, Mississippi, where he spent his final days. Conerly owned shoe stores throughout the Mississippi Delta. On December 13, 1959, Perian appeared on an episode of What's My Line?. Her line was she wrote a football column for newspapers.

Conerly was inducted into the Mississippi Sports Hall of Fame in 1966 and the Ole Miss Athletic Hall of Fame in 1987. He is also a member of the Ole Miss Team of the Century (1893–1992). Conerly is the namesake of the football award, the Conerly Trophy, given annually to the top college player in the State of Mississippi. The Professional Football Researchers Association named Conerly to the PRFA Hall of Very Good Class of 2006. He is a seven-time Pro Football Hall of Fame finalist, but has yet to be elected as a member of the Hall.

== Illness and death ==
Conerly underwent triple-bypass heart surgery on September 19, 1995, his birthday. He died on February 13, 1996, of heart failure following a long illness, his wife told The New York Times. He was also survived by his sisters.

== See also ==
- List of NCAA major college football yearly passing leaders
- History of the New York Giants (1925–78)
- Ole Miss Rebels
