= 1950 Chicago Cardinals season =

American football team season

- Head coach: Curly Lambeau
- Home stadium: Comiskey Park (I)

Results
- Record: 5–7
- Division place: 5th NFL American
- Playoffs: Did not qualify

The 1950 Chicago Cardinals season marked the 31st year the team was in the National Football League (NFL). The team failed to improve on their previous output of 6–5–1, winning only five games and failing to qualify for the playoffs for the second consecutive season.

== Schedule ==
Week	Date	Opponent	Result	Record	Venue	Attendance	Recap
1	Bye						
2	September 24	**Philadelphia Eagles**	**L** 7–45	0–1	Comiskey Park	24,914	Recap
3	October 2	Baltimore Colts	**W** 55–13	1–1	Comiskey Park	14,439	Recap
4	October 8	at Chicago Bears	**L** 6–27	1–2	Wrigley Field	48,025	Recap
5	October 15	at **Cleveland Browns**	**L** 24–34	1–3	Cleveland Stadium	33,774	Recap
6	October 22	at **Washington Redskins**	**W** 38–28	2–3	Griffith Stadium	27,856	Recap
7	October 29	**New York Giants**	**W** 17–3	3–3	Comiskey Park	23,964	Recap
8	November 5	**Cleveland Browns**	**L** 7–10	3–4	Comiskey Park	38,456	Recap
9	November 12	at **New York Giants**	**L** 21–51	3–5	Polo Grounds	22,380	Recap
10	November 19	at **Philadelphia Eagles**	**W** 14–10	4–5	Shibe Park	28,368	Recap
11	November 23	**Pittsburgh Steelers**	**L** 17–28	4–6	Comiskey Park	11,622	Recap
12	December 3	Chicago Bears	**W** 20–10	5–6	Comiskey Park	31,919	Recap
13	December 10	at **Pittsburgh Steelers**	**L** 7–28	5–7	Forbes Field	18,301	Recap
Note: Intra-conference opponents are in **bold** text.

== Standings ==
NFL American Conference
	W	L	T	PCT	CONF	PF	PA	STK
Cleveland Browns	10	2	0	.833	8–2	310	144	W6
New York Giants	10	2	0	.833	8–2	268	150	W6
Pittsburgh Steelers	6	6	0	.500	5–5	180	195	W1
Philadelphia Eagles	6	6	0	.500	4–6	254	141	L4
Chicago Cardinals	5	7	0	.417	3–6	233	287	L1
Washington Redskins	3	9	0	.250	1–8	232	326	L1

Note: Tie games were not officially counted in the standings until 1972.

== Personnel ==
=== Staff / Coaches ===
1950 Chicago Cardinals staff
Front office: Principal / Majority Owner – Violet Bidwill Wolfner; General Manager – Ray Bennigsen; Coaching staff: Head Coach – Curly Lambeau; Assistant Coaches: Backfield Coach / Assistant Head Coach - Cecil Isbell; Ends Coach - Billy Dewell; Line Coach / Assistant Head Coach - Phil Handler	Special Teams Coaches: None - N/A

=== Roster ===
Official 1950 Cardinals team photo.

1950 Chicago Cardinals Roster
Quarterbacks: 21 Jim Hardy P; 8 Frank Tripucka P; Running backs: 7 Elmer Angsman; 87 Babe Dimancheff; 34 Pat Harder K; 90 Vic Schwall; 62 Charley Trippi; 33 Vinnie Yablonski K; Receivers: 41 Fran Polsfoot; 60 Bob Shaw	Linemen/Linebackers: 68 Plato Andros DG/G/T; 75 Ray Apolskis DG; 55 Ed Bagdon DG/G; 32 Vince Banonis LB/C; 57 Bill Blackburn LB/C; 9 Gerard Cowhig LB; 42 Bob Dove DE; 72 Bill Fischer T/DT; 82 John Goldsberry T/DT; 66 Jerry Hennessy DE; 11 John Hock DT; 50 Jack Jennings T; 64 Lloyd McDermott DT; 18 George Petrovich G; 20 Buster Ramsey G; 70 Knox Ramsey DT; 51 Tom Wham DE	Defensive backs: 31 Jerry Davis CB; 80 Malcolm Kutner CB/WR; 37 Don Paul CB/RB; 61 Ray Ramsey CB; 67 Bill Svoboda S; 44 Mike Swistowicz CB; Reserve: 99 Bob Nussbaumer CB/S (IR); rookies in italics
