= 1950 New York Yanks season =

National Football League team season

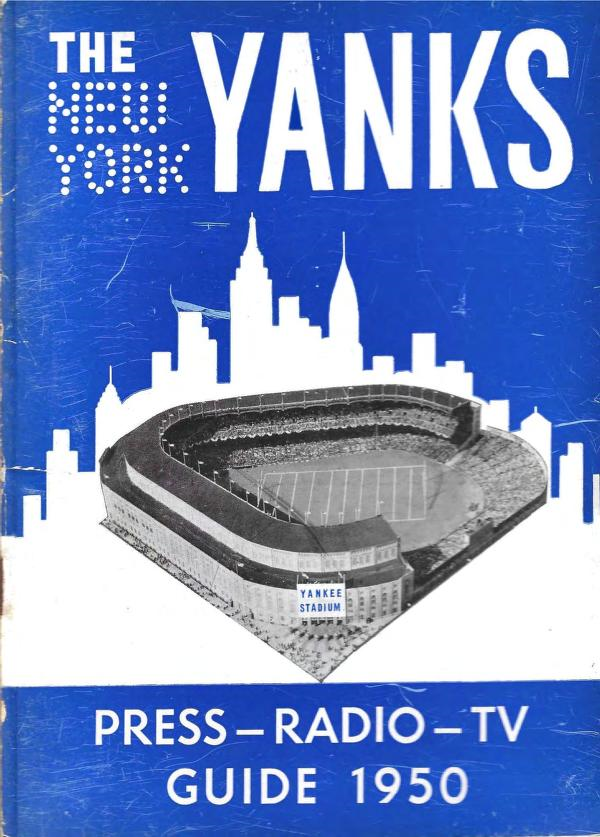
- Head coach: Red Strader
- Home stadium: Yankee Stadium

Results
- Record: 7–5
- Division place: 3rd NFL National
- Playoffs: Did not qualify

The 1950 New York Yanks season was their first as the Yanks (previously being the New York Bulldogs, Boston Yanks, Brooklyn Dodgers and original founding APFA member and Ohio League franchise Dayton Triangles).

The team improved on their previous season's output of 1–10–1, winning seven games. Their games were particularly high scoring; in seven of their twelve games, forty or more points were scored by a single team.

== Offseason ==
=== Draft ===
1950 New York Yanks draft
Round	Pick	Player	Position	College	Notes
2	16	Art Weiner	End	North Carolina	
4	42	Zollie Toth *	Fullback	LSU	
5	55	Mike Swistowicz	Halfback	Notre Dame	
6	68	Ben Aldridge	Defensive back	Oklahoma A&M	
7	81	Don Narrell	Tackle	TCU	Signed with Edmonton Eskimos (WIFU)
8	94	Jack Archer	Back	TCU	
10	120	Melvin Lyle	End	LSU	
11	133	Roger McAuley	Guard	TCU	
12	146	Andy Hillhouse	End	Texas A&M	
13	159	Jack Morton	Back	West Virginia	
14	172	Ed Carmichael	Guard	Oregon State	
15	185	Norm Meseroll	Tackle	Tennessee	
16	198	Bill Stetter	Center	Holy Cross	
17	211	Joe Dean Tidwell	Back	Midwestern State	
18	224	Jim Champion	Linebacker	Mississippi State	
19	237	Bobbie Griffin	Defensive back	Baylor	Made roster in 1951
20	250	Darrell Royal	Back	Oklahoma	
21	263	Bud French	Back	Kansas	
22	276	R.V. Johnson	Tackle	Saint Mary's (CA)	
23	289	Dick Sheffield	End	Tulane	
24	302	Bill DeYoung	Back	Stanford	
25	315	Steve Dotur	Guard	Oregon	
26	328	Red Noonan	Back	Alabama	
27	341	Chuck Olson	End	Washington	
28	354	Ed Petty	Center	Hardin–Simmons	
29	367	Ed Jasonek	Back	Furman	
30	380	John Poulos	Back	Pacific	
Made roster * Made at least one Pro Bowl during career

== Schedule ==
Week	Date	Opponent	Result	Record	Venue	Recap
1	September 17	at **San Francisco 49ers**	**W** 21–17	1–0	Kezar Stadium	Recap
2	September 22	at **Los Angeles Rams**	**L** 28–45	1–1	Los Angeles Memorial Coliseum	Recap
3	September 29	**Detroit Lions**	**W** 44–21	2–1	Yankee Stadium	Recap
4	October 8	at **Green Bay Packers**	**W** 44–31	3–1	City Stadium	Recap
5	October 12	**San Francisco 49ers**	**W** 29–24	4–1	Yankee Stadium	Recap
6	October 19	**Green Bay Packers**	**W** 35–17	5–1	Yankee Stadium	Recap
7	October 29	**Chicago Bears**	**W** 38–27	6–1	Yankee Stadium	Recap
8	Bye					
9	November 12	at **Chicago Bears**	**L** 20–28	6–2	Wrigley Field	Recap
10	November 19	**Los Angeles Rams**	**L** 35–43	6–3	Yankee Stadium	Recap
11	November 23	at **Detroit Lions**	**L** 14–49	6–4	Briggs Stadium	Recap
12	December 3	at New York Giants	**L** 7–51	6–5	Polo Grounds	Recap
13	December 10	**Baltimore Colts**	**W** 51–14	7–5	Yankee Stadium	Recap
Note: Intra-conference opponents are in **bold** text.

== Standings ==
Program for the September 22 game against the Los Angeles Rams.

NFL National Conference
	W	L	T	PCT	CONF	PF	PA	STK
Los Angeles Rams	9	3	0	.750	9–2	466	309	W1
Chicago Bears	9	3	0	.750	8–2	279	207	W1
New York Yanks	7	5	0	.583	7–4	366	367	W1
Detroit Lions	6	6	0	.500	5–6	321	285	L1
San Francisco 49ers	3	9	0	.250	3–8	213	300	W1
Green Bay Packers	3	9	0	.250	2–9	244	406	L2
Baltimore Colts	1	11	0	.083	1–4	213	462	L5

Note: Tie games were not officially counted in the standings until 1972.

== Roster ==
New York Yanks 1950 roster
Quarterbacks: 61 George Ratterman; 18 John Rauch; Running backs: 31 Ben Aldridge CB; 46 Sherman Howard; 20 George Taliaferro; 86 Zollie Toth; 76 Buddy Young; Receivers: 4 Dan Edwards; 66 Art Weiner	Linemen/Linebackers: 12 Bruce Alford DE/WR; 38 George Brown G; 35 Jim Champion MG/DT; 21 Johnny Clowes MG/G; 34 Joe Domnanovich C/MLB; 22 Brad Ecklund C; 36 Nate Johnson T/DT; 85 Bob Kennedy OLB; 56 Lou Kusserow LB/FB; 59 Paul Mitchell DT; 44 John Nolan T/DT; 84 Barney Poole DE/WR; 47 Martin Ruby T/DT; 16 Jack Russell DE/WR; 51 Ed Sharkey MLB/G; 24 Joe Signaigo G/OLB; 83 Carroll Vogelaar T/DT; 65 John Wozniak G; 50 John Yonakor DE	Defensive backs: 10 Joe Golding CB; 17 Pete Layden CB; 81 Spec Sanders S/P; Special teams: 71 Chet Adams K	Reserve list: 15 Duke Iversen LB (IR); rookies in italics
