= 1950 Detroit Lions season =

NFL team season

- Head coach: Bo McMillin
- Home stadium: Briggs Stadium

Results
- Record: 6–6
- Division place: 4th NFL National
- Playoffs: Did not qualify

The 1950 Detroit Lions season was their 21st in the league. The team improved on their previous season's output of 4–8, winning six games. They failed to qualify for the playoffs for the 15th consecutive season.

== Regular season ==
According to the team, a total of 8,685 season tickets were sold by the Lions for the 1950 campaign. The Lions played their home games in Briggs Stadium (Tiger Stadium), which had a regular listed seating capacity of 46,194, with an additional 7,000 bleacher seats for football to bring total capacity to 53,194.

=== Schedule ===
Game	Date	Opponent	Result	Record	Venue	Attendance	Recap	Sources
1	September 17	at **Green Bay Packers**	**W** 45–7	1–0	City Stadium	20,285	Recap	
2	September 24	Pittsburgh Steelers	**W** 10–7	2–0	Briggs Stadium	19,600	Recap	
3	September 29	at **New York Yanks**	**L** 21–44	2–1	Yankee Stadium	11,096	Recap	
4	October 8	**San Francisco 49ers**	**W** 24–7	3–1	Briggs Stadium	26,000	Recap	
5	October 15	**Los Angeles Rams**	**L** 28–30	3–2	Briggs Stadium	28,000	Recap	
6	October 22	at **San Francisco 49ers**	**L** 27–28	3–3	Kezar Stadium	26,252	Recap	
7	October 29	at **Los Angeles Rams**	**L** 24–65	3–4	Los Angeles Memorial Coliseum	21,700	Recap	
8	November 5	**Chicago Bears**	**L** 21–35	3–5	Briggs Stadium	32,000	Recap	
—	Bye							
9	November 19	**Green Bay Packers**	**W** 24–21	4–5	Briggs Stadium	18,000	Recap	
10	November 23	**New York Yanks**	**W** 49–14	5–5	Briggs Stadium	28,000	Recap	
11	December 3	at **Baltimore Colts**	**W** 45–21	6–5	Memorial Stadium	12,058	Recap	
12	December 10	at **Chicago Bears**	**L** 3–6	6–6	Wrigley Field	34,604	Recap	
Note: Intra-conference opponents are in **bold** text. Thanksgiving: Thursday, November 23.

=== Standings ===
Program for the October 15 game against the Los Angeles Rams.

NFL National Conference
	W	L	T	PCT	CONF	PF	PA	STK
Los Angeles Rams	9	3	0	.750	9–2	466	309	W1
Chicago Bears	9	3	0	.750	8–2	279	207	W1
New York Yanks	7	5	0	.583	7–4	366	367	W1
Detroit Lions	6	6	0	.500	5–6	321	285	L1
San Francisco 49ers	3	9	0	.250	3–8	213	300	W1
Green Bay Packers	3	9	0	.250	2–9	244	406	L2
Baltimore Colts	1	11	0	.083	1–4	213	462	L5

Note: Tie games were not officially counted in the standings until 1972.

== Roster ==
1950 Detroit Lions roster
Quarterbacks (QB): 24 Fred Enke; 22 Bobby Layne; Running backs (RB): 33 Ollie Cline; 81 Rex Grossman; 14 Bob Hoernschemeyer; 16 Dante Magnani CB; 42 Lindy Pearson; 37 Doak Walker K/P; Wide receivers (WR): 80 Cloyce Box; 81 John Greene; 82 Leon Hart DE/OLB; 89 Dick Rifenburg; Tight ends (TE)	Offensive linemen (OL): 64 Howie Brown G; 71 Chet Bulger T; 70 Gus Cifelli T; 76 Lou Creekmur G; 74 Dick Flanagan G; 72 Floyd Jaszewski G; 53 Jack Simmons C; 60 Joe Soboleski G; Defensive linemen (DL): 65 Les Bingaman MG; 88 Jim Cain DE; 84 Barney Hafen DE; 73 Thurman McGraw DT; 75 John Prchlik DT	Linebackers (LB): 57 Jack Lininger MLB/C; 33 John Panelli OLB/FB; 36 Bill Schroll OLB/FB; 51 Joe Watson OLB/C; Defensive backs (DB): 44 Don Doll CB; 28 Don Panciera S; 48 Clarence Self S/RB; 40 Bob Smith CB/P; Special teams (ST)	Reserve: 18 Wally Triplett RB/CB (Military); 17 Jerry Krall RB (IR); Rookies in italics

== See also ==
- 1950 in Michigan
