= Len Ford =

American football player (1926–1972)

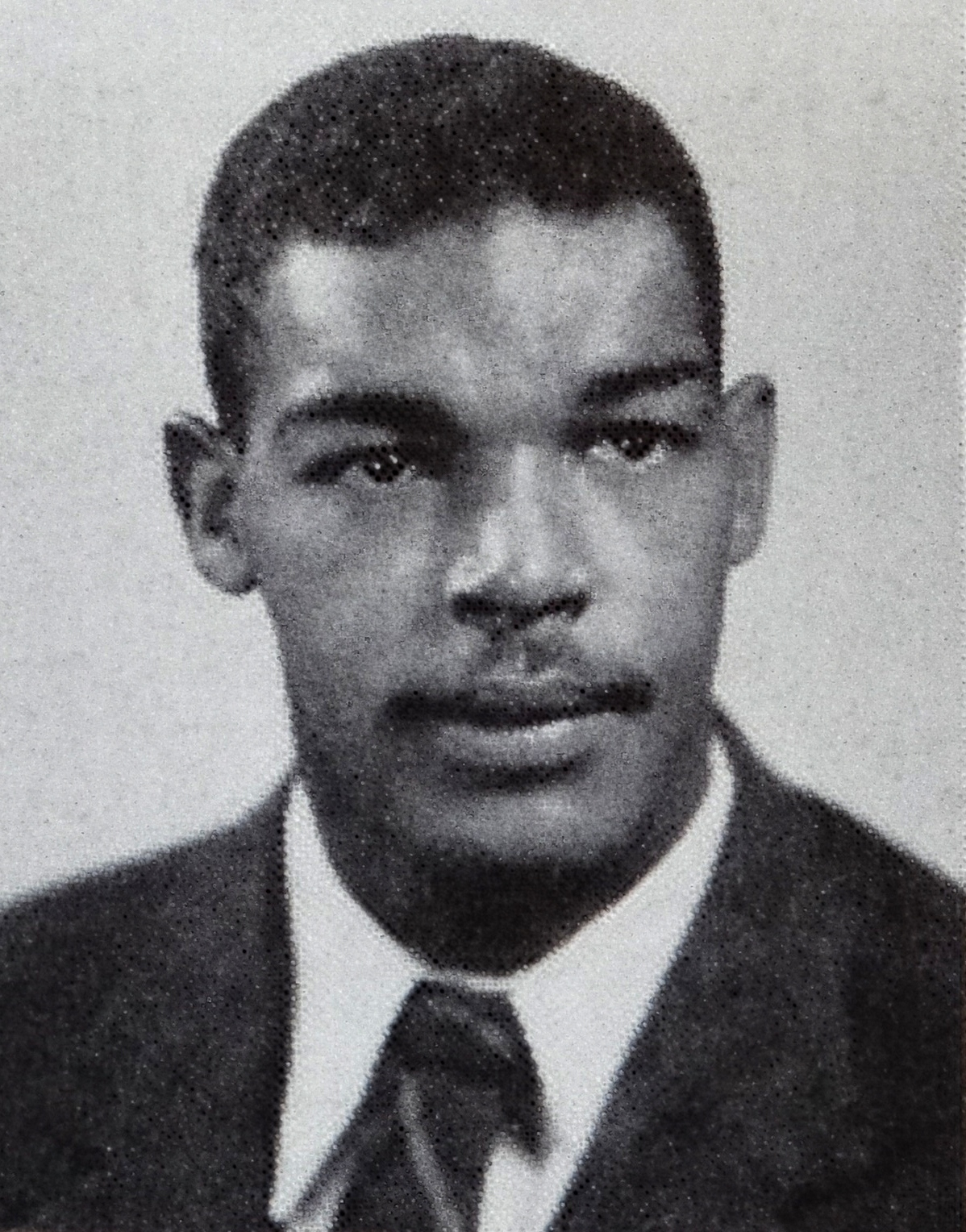
- Ford from the 1948 Michiganensian

No. 50, 53, 80, 83
- Positions: Defensive end, end

Personal information
- Born: February 18, 1926; Washington, D.C., U.S.
- Died: March 14, 1972 (aged 46); Detroit, Michigan, U.S.
- Listed height: 6 ft 4 in (1.93 m)
- Listed weight: 245 lb (111 kg)

Career information
- High school: Armstrong (Washington, D.C.)
- College: Morgan State (1944); Michigan (1945–1947)
- NFL draft: 1948: undrafted

Career history
- Los Angeles Dons (1948–1949); Cleveland Browns (1950–1957); Green Bay Packers (1958)

Awards and highlights
- 3× NFL champion (1950, 1954, 1955); 4× First-team All-Pro (1951–1954); 4× Pro Bowl (1951–1954); NFL 1950s All-Decade Team; Cleveland Browns Ring of Honor; National champion (1947); Second-team All-American (1947); Third-team All-American (1946); Second-team All-Big Nine (1947)

Career NFL/AAFC statistics
- Interceptions: 3
- Fumble recoveries: 20
- Receptions: 67
- Receiving yards: 1,175
- Total touchdowns: 9
- Stats at Pro Football Reference
- Pro Football Hall of Fame

Leonard Guy Ford Jr. (February 18, 1926 – March 14, 1972) was an American professional football player who was an offensive and defensive end from 1948 to 1958. He played college football for the University of Michigan and professional football for the Los Angeles Dons, Cleveland Browns and Green Bay Packers. He was inducted into the Pro Football Hall of Fame in 1976 and the University of Michigan Athletic Hall of Honor in 1996.

Ford was an all-city athlete at his high school in Washington, D.C., and attended Morgan State University after graduating in 1944. After a brief stint in the U.S. Navy the following year, he transferred to Michigan, where he played on the Michigan Wolverines football team as an offensive and defensive end. He played for Michigan from 1945 to 1947 and was a member of the undefeated 1947 team that has been selected as the best team in the history of Michigan football.

Ford was passed over in all 32 rounds of the 1948 NFL draft, but was selected by the Los Angeles Dons of the rival All-America Football Conference (AAFC), where he played for two seasons as an offensive and defensive end. After the AAFC dissolved in 1949, Ford played eight seasons as a defensive end for the Cleveland Browns. During those eight seasons, the Browns advanced to the NFL championship game seven times, won three championships, and allowed the fewest points in the NFL six times. Ford was one of the dominant defensive players of his era, having a rare combination of size and speed that helped him disrupt opposing offenses and force fumbles. He was selected as a first-team All-NFL player five times and played in four Pro Bowls. He was also one of two defensive ends named to the National Football League 1950s All-Decade Team.

Ford was traded to the Packers in 1958, but played there just one season before retiring. He worked for the Detroit recreation department from 1963 to 1972. He suffered a heart attack and died in 1972 at age 46.

== Early life ==
Ford was born in Washington, D.C., in 1926. His father, Leonard G. Ford Sr., was a Virginia native who was employed as a "skilled laborer" by the federal government in 1920 and as a printing operator at the Government Printing Office in 1940. His mother, Geraldine, was also a Virginia native who worked as a social worker in a settlement house in 1940. Ford had an older sister, Anita, and a younger brother, Claude.

As a teenager, Ford attended Armstrong Technical High School, where he played football, basketball and baseball. As a high school athlete, he aspired to play fullback in football, but he later recalled, "I started to grow, and I grew right out of the backfield." He was chosen by local sportswriters as an all-city athlete in all three sports in his senior year, and he served as captain of all three teams for one season each.

After he graduated in 1944, Theodore McIntyre, Ford's high school football coach, suggested he attend Morgan State University, a historically black college in Baltimore, Maryland. Ford played for the Morgan State Bears football team for one year under head coach Edward P. Hurt, while also starring as the center on the school's basketball team. The basketball team won its league's championship in 1944. Ford left Morgan State and joined the U.S. Navy in 1945, but stayed in the service only briefly as World War II came to an end.

== College career ==
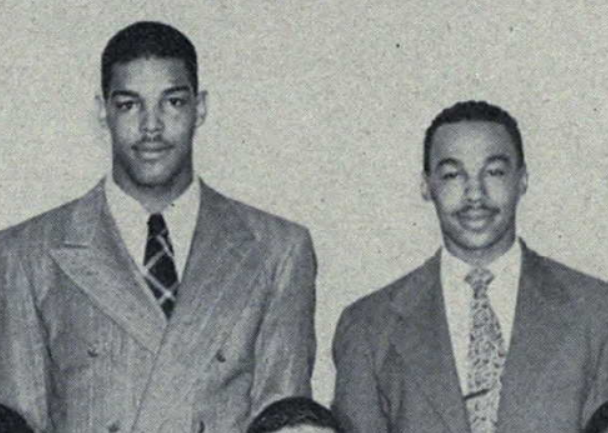
Ford (at left) and Bob Mann of Omega Psi Phi both went on to play in the NFL.

After the war, Ford transferred to the University of Michigan to play football in a bigger program than Morgan State's. He wanted to "get a shot at playing in the Rose Bowl one day", he later said. While attending Michigan, he was a member of Omega Psi Phi, an all-black fraternity whose membership also included Bob Mann, another Michigan end who went on to play in the NFL.

=== 1945 and 1946 seasons ===
In 1945, Ford was Michigan's tallest player at 6 feet 5 inches (196 cm) and 190 pounds. Ford played as a backup at the left end for the 1945 Michigan football team that compiled a 7–3 win–loss record under head coach Fritz Crisler. When Ford caught a pass from Wally Teninga in Michigan's 26–0 victory over Minnesota in early November 1945, The New York Times took note and referred to Ford as "a six-foot, five-inch giant."

As a junior in 1946, Ford had gained 16 pounds and weighed 206 pounds. That year, Ford and Bob Mann shared the left end position, with Ford starting four games and Mann two. The 1946 Michigan team finished with a 6–2–1 record. During the 1946 season, Ford established himself as a tenacious tackler on defense and was also a receiving threat as an end on offense. In the first game of the 1946 season, a 21–0 victory over Indiana, Ford recovered an Indiana fumble and then scored the game's second touchdown on a 17-yard pass from Pete Elliott, "leaping high in the air to grab the pigskin with one hand from the two backs guarding him in the end zone." Later in the season, he scored a touchdown against Wisconsin on an end-around, a play Michigan employed frequently with Ford. Ford also developed a reputation for forcing opponent fumbles with his technique of "punching at the ball".

=== 1947 season ===
By 1947, Ford had grown to 215 pounds, 25 pounds heavier than he had weighed in 1945. Led by All-American halfbacks Bob Chappuis and Bump Elliott, the undefeated 1947 Michigan team has been selected as the best team in the history of Michigan football. Nicknamed the "Mad Magicians", the Michigan squad finished with a 10–0 record, capped by a 49–0 victory in the Rose Bowl over USC on New Year's Day. Ford started only one game in 1947, as Bob Mann was the starting left end in eight of Michigan's 10 games. Even with reduced playing time, Ford caught a 35-yard touchdown pass in the first game of the season and had two receptions for 82 yards in the 55–0 win over Michigan State. He scored again in a game against Pitt. Ford's defensive performance was credited with shutting down Ohio State in the final game of the 1947 season. After the Wolverines' 21–0 victory over the Buckeyes, The Michigan Daily wrote:

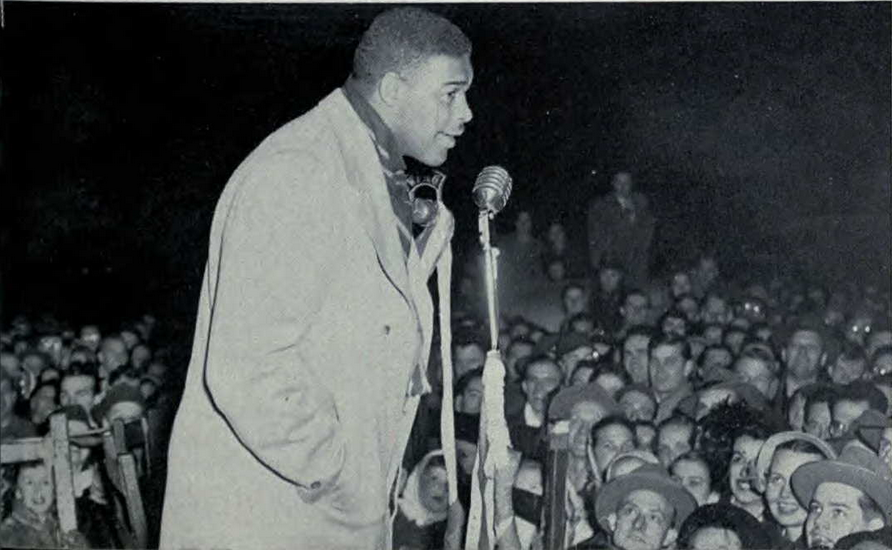
Ford speaks to fans in Michigan after victory in 1948 Rose Bowl

For the defense it was big Len Ford, who sparked a forward wall that never let the Bucks threaten. His end was practically impregnable. He smashed Ohio interference time and again, he continually harassed Dick Slager and Pandel Savic, the Ohio passers, and he made life miserable for Pete Perini, blocking one punt and rushing the Buckeye punter on nearly all of his kicks.

Michigan finished first in the AP Poll and won the 1947 college football national championship, sharing the honor with Notre Dame, which had been first in the polls before the Rose Bowl. After the 1947 season, the Associated Press (AP) selected Ford as a third-team All-American end and named teammate Bob Mann as a second-team All-American end. The AP also named Ford a second-team all-Big Nine Conference end. In the summer of 1948, he accepted an invitation to play for the college team in the College All-Star Game, a now-defunct annual matchup between the champion of the professional National Football League (NFL) and a selection of the country's best college players.

== Professional career ==
=== Los Angeles Dons ===
Despite his accomplishments in college, Ford was passed over in all 32 rounds of the 1948 NFL draft during a time when most professional teams did not employ blacks. (The following year, George Taliaferro became the first black player to be selected in an NFL draft.) He was selected, however, by the Los Angeles Dons of the rival All-America Football Conference (AAFC) in the third round of the 1948 AAFC Draft. He signed with the Dons in April 1948.

Playing as a right end opposite Joe Aguirre, Ford had 31 catches for 598 yards and seven touchdowns in 1948. As was the case at Michigan, Ford also worked on defense and was one of the AAFC's most successful pass-rushers. The Dons, meanwhile, finished the regular season with a 7–7 record, good for third place in the AAFC West. Ford played basketball in the off-season for the New York Renaissance, an all-black professional team in the National Basketball League. He did not play basketball at Michigan, the Big Ten Conference having maintained racial segregation of basketball until 1950.

Ford had 36 catches for 577 yards and one touchdown in 1949, while the Dons fell to 4–8. The AAFC struggled financially during Ford's time with the Dons. Its teams competed with NFL franchises for fans' attention and player talent – the Dons shared a city with the NFL's Los Angeles Rams. By late 1949, team owners came to an agreement under which the Cleveland Browns, San Francisco 49ers and Baltimore Colts joined the NFL and the rest of the league's teams, including the Dons, folded.

=== Cleveland Browns ===
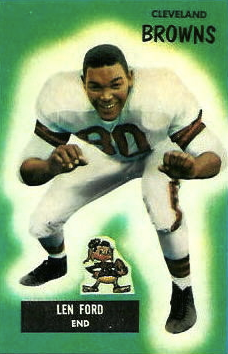
Ford pictured on a 1955 football card, while with the Browns

==== 1950 season ====
After the AAFC disbanded, the Browns selected Ford in the second round of the 1950 AAFC dispersal draft, created to reallocate former Dons, Buffalo Bills and Chicago Hornets players. Ford signed with the Browns in July 1950.

Cleveland head coach Paul Brown converted Ford into solely a defensive end as two-platoon systems gained popularity after 1950. Ford bulked up to 260 pounds and quickly became a fixture of Cleveland's defense alongside linebacker Bill Willis and defensive back Warren Lahr. He was one of five black players for Cleveland – the others were Willis, punter Horace Gillom and fullbacks Emerson Cole and Marion Motley – at a time when many other teams had never signed a black player. The Browns, in fact, had roughly a third of the black players in the NFL on their roster. Cleveland sports writer Chuck Heaton later recalled that Ford was "a leader, particularly with the black players on the squad."

Led by an offense that featured Motley, quarterback Otto Graham and ends Mac Speedie and Dante Lavelli, the 1950 Browns finished the regular season with a 10–2 record and won the 1950 NFL Championship Game over the Los Angeles Rams.

In a mid-October game against the Chicago Cardinals, an elbow by Pat Harder broke Ford's nose, cheekbone, and maxilla (upper jaw), knocked out two teeth, loosened several teeth and chipped another. Ford, who had been fighting with Harder throughout the game, punched him following the play, resulting in a penalty, his ejection from the game and a $50 ($669 in 2025 dollars) fine. NFL commissioner Bert Bell withdrew the fine when the damage to Ford's face was revealed. Ford's facial injuries were so severe that a plastic surgery procedure was required, "virtually rebuilding the big end's face." The Browns' long-time team doctor, Vic Ippolito, described Ford's injuries as "a sickening sight."

Ford started only four regular-season games in 1950 because of the injury. However, he asked to be reinstated for the 1950 NFL Championship Game. Head coach Paul Brown agreed to allow Ford to suit up after receiving approval from the team doctor and arranging for a special mask to be built to protect Ford from further injury. Ford had been on a liquid diet until late November and dropped from 240 to 215 pounds, though he was back up to 223 pounds shortly before the championship game. As the championship game got underway, Ford sat on the bench as the Rams moved the ball 82 yards down the field for a touchdown. Browns head coach Paul Brown knew the defense had to tighten, and he called on Ford to enter the game. The Cleveland Plain Dealer later called this "one of Len Ford's great moments." Paul Brown stated that Ford "showed me that day he really was a man." Brown later recalled that Ford was the team's "only real hope of plugging a hole" and recalled one sequence as a defining moment in the game:

I'll always remember one three-play sequence where he threw Vitamin Smith for a 14-yard loss on a reverse, sacked [Bob] Waterfield for another big loss and finally smothered Glenn Davis on an end run. That turned the game around for us.

The Browns' defense held the Rams scoreless in the fourth quarter, and the Browns won the championship game by a 30–28 score in their first season in the league.

==== 1951 season ====
Ford continued to excel as a pass-rusher in 1951, when the Browns again advanced to the NFL Championship Game but lost to the Rams. He recovered four fumbles during the season and was named a first-team All-Pro by both the Associated Press (AP) and the United Press International (UPI). He was also named to the Pro Bowl, the NFL's all-star game. Ford's dominating play allowed Brown to assign him to two offensive linemen, giving Cleveland the latitude to put four men on the line and use three linebackers in what is now known as the 4–3 defense. Cleveland's defensive coach Blanton Collier later recalled the thinking behind moving Ford: "We knew we had to get him in closer where his talents as a pass rusher could best be utilized, so we moved both tackles in and dropped the linebackers off the outside. It may have been the beginning of today's 4–3 defense." Collier also noted that "Len was very aggressive and had that touch of meanness in him that you find in most defensive players."

==== 1952 season ====
The 1952 Browns had eight regular-season wins and won the NFL's East Division, but lost to the Detroit Lions in the 1952 NFL Championship Game. Ford, meanwhile, extended his run of dominance against opposing offenses in an era before the quarterback sack was a recorded statistic. For the second consecutive year, he was named a first-team All-Pro by both the AP and UPI and was selected for the Pro Bowl.

==== 1953 season ====
The 1953 Browns compiled an 11–1 record and again advanced to the NFL Championship Game, losing to the Detroit Lions. For the third consecutive year, Ford was named a first-team All-Pro by both the AP and UPI and was selected for the Pro Bowl.

==== 1954 season ====
Willis and Motley retired after the 1953 season, but Ford and Don Colo continued to anchor the defense alongside Lahr in the secondary. The 1954 Browns lost two of their first three games, but finished the season with a 9–3 record and returned to win the 1954 NFL Championship Game over the Lions. Ford had two interceptions in the Browns' 56–10 win over the Lions, including one which he returned 45 yards to set a new NFL playoff record. Ford recovered a career-high five fumbles in 1954, and he was selected as a first-team All-Pro by the AP and UPI for the fourth year in a row. He was also selected to play in his fourth consecutive Pro Bowl.

==== 1955 season ====
The 1955 Browns compiled a 9–2–1 record in 1955 and won the 1955 NFL Championship Game against the Los Angeles Rams, helped by a strong defensive effort and six interceptions of quarterback Norm Van Brocklin. Ford was selected as a first-team All-Pro by the UPI, the Newspaper Enterprise Association (NEA) and the New York Daily News. He was named a second-team All-Pro by the AP.

==== 1956 and 1957 seasons ====
Graham and many of the players that had helped propel the Browns to a series of championship game appearances retired before the 1956 season. The 1956 team finished 5–7 that year, their first losing record.

By 1957, there was speculation that Ford, then age 31, might not make the Browns' roster. Ford arrived at training camp well above his playing weight, and rookie Bob Mischak was given Ford's spot in August. When Mischak withdrew from the team, the spot was awarded to another rookie, Paul Wiggin. Ford worked to shed pounds during training camp and worked to train the young defensive players, including Wiggin and Bill Quinlan. Rookie running back Jim Brown recalled that Ford pulled him aside during the 1957 training camp and gave him advice on dealing with the Browns' head coach Paul Brown. Ford advised the rookie to keep his mouth shut and do as the coach set during practice and waiting until game day: "Run it your way in the game and hope it works, and if it does, don't say anything. Just make your yardage and act like it was a mistake."

Ford was slowed for several weeks during the 1957 season by a severely bruised shoulder, but the Browns, led by Jim Brown, reached the 1957 NFL Championship Game, losing to the Lions. Cleveland's defense allowed the fewest points in the NFL in six of Ford's eight seasons with the team.

=== Green Bay Packers ===
In May 1958, the Browns traded Ford to the Green Bay Packers in exchange for a draft choice. Green Bay coach Ray McLean said at the time that he acquired Ford for his talent at putting pressure on the quarterback and noted that "he's one of the toughest guys in the league to block because of his speed, size and agility." The 1958 Green Bay team won just one game in Ford's lone season there. Ford suffered multiple broken fingers before the last game of the 1958 season, and, because he was unable to play, the Packers refused to pay Ford the final $916.66 due on his contract. In 1961, Ford sued the Packers in Wayne County Circuit Court in Detroit to collect the $916.66 plus $10,000 for alleged damage to his reputation caused by the Packers' releasing him.

=== Career statistics and legacy ===
Ford recovered 20 fumbles in his career, an NFL record at the time he retired as a player. He was successful in part because of his combination of quickness and size. Few players of his era who were as tall and big as he was could move as fast; only Larry Brink of the Rams was close to him in proportions.

In 1969, Ford placed second in voting for the greatest defense end in NFL history. He was edged out by Gino Marchetti. He and Marchetti were selected as the defensive ends on the National Football League 1950s All-Decade Team.

In 1976, Ford was posthumously inducted into the Pro Football Hall of Fame. He was selected for induction by the 27-man media board that had responsibility for selections at that time.

He was also inducted into the University of Michigan Athletic Hall of Honor in 1996.

== Family and later years ==
In 1951, Ford married Geraldine Bledsoe Ford (1926–2003), who was a lawyer in the 1950s, and in the mid-1960s became the first black woman to serve as a judge in Michigan. They had two daughters, Anita and Deborah, and divorced in 1959.

While playing in the NFL, Ford worked during the off-season in a Detroit real estate office. He developed a reputation for being "cagey with the dollar" and told Jet magazine in 1955: "In what other sport can a boy just graduated from college make $5,000 in his first six months, then have a half-year left to make more money?" After retiring from football, Ford attended the Detroit College of Law for a year-and-a-half, but never received a law degree. From 1963 until his death, Ford worked as the assistant director at Considine Recreation Center, the largest recreation center in Detroit. At the time of his death 16 months later, he was described in obituaries as the assistant recreation director for the City of Detroit.

Sports writer Chuck Heaton wrote that Ford's life was "pretty much down hill" after he retired from professional football. Heaton recalled that, in his later years, Ford seemed in poor physical condition, "only a shadow of the mighty end he once was." Ford still aspired to obtain his law license, but, according to Heaton, "appeared to have lost the drive which made him such a great football player." Don Newcombe, who became good friends with Ford, was more blunt. Interviewed in 1980, Newcombe said that Ford's life was "decimated" because of alcohol. Newcombe added: "He became a wino, stumbling around in alleys. He gave up his life for alcohol."

Ford suffered a heart attack in early March 1972 and died the following week at Detroit General Hospital. He was age 46 at the time of his death. He was buried at Lincoln Memorial Cemetery in Suitland, MD.
