= Paul "Tank" Younger =

American football player (1928–2001)

Tank Younger
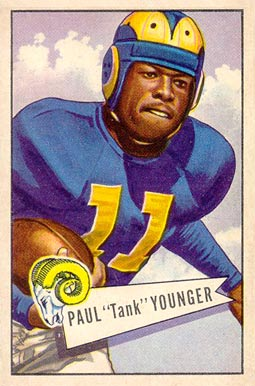
- Younger on a 1952 Bowman football card

No. 13, 11, 35
- Positions: Fullback, halfback, linebacker

Personal information
- Born: June 25, 1928; Grambling, Louisiana, U.S.
- Died: September 15, 2001 (aged 73); Inglewood, California, U.S.
- Listed height: 6 ft 3 in (1.91 m)
- Listed weight: 225 lb (102 kg)

Career information
- High school: Grambling State U. Lab. (LA)
- College: Grambling State (1945–1948)
- NFL draft: 1949: undrafted

Career history
- Los Angeles Rams (1949–1957); Pittsburgh Steelers (1958)

Awards and highlights
- NFL champion (1951); First-team All-Pro (1951); 2× Second-team All-Pro (1952, 1954); 4× Pro Bowl (1951–1953, 1955)

Career NFL statistics
- Rushing yards: 3,640
- Rushing average: 4.7
- Receptions: 100
- Receiving yards: 1,167
- Total touchdowns: 35
- Stats at Pro Football Reference
- College Football Hall of Fame

Paul Lawrence "Tank" Younger (June 25, 1928 – September 15, 2001) was an American professional football player who was a fullback, halfback, and linebacker in the National Football League (NFL) from 1949 through 1958 with the Los Angeles Rams and Pittsburgh Steelers. Younger played on four Rams teams that went to NFL championship games (winning in 1951); played in four NFL All-Star Games (Pro Bowls); and was first or second team All-Pro three times, first as a linebacker and later as a running back.

He played college football for Grambling State University, leading all college football players with 25 touchdowns as a freshman in 1945, and graduated with the most touchdowns scored by a player in college football history (60), up to that time (1948). He was the first NFL player to have come from an historically black college and university (HBCU), and was the first African American to become an NFL front-office administrator (scout and executive with the Rams until 1975). Younger also became the NFL’s first black assistant general manager (with the San Diego Chargers from 1975 to 1986).

== Early life ==
Younger was born on June 25, 1928, in Grambling, Louisiana. He was one of five children born to Corbett and Callie Younger. His family moved to Los Angeles in 1940. Younger's godfather Dr. Ralph Waldo Emerson Jones was Grambling College's president. Jones encouraged Younger's family to have Younger return to Grambling for his education in high school and college, while spending summers with his family in Los Angeles. While residing in Grambling for his schooling Younger lived with Dr. Jones, and Younger’s godmother Fidelia O. Johnson.

Younger attended Grambling State University Laboratory High School, where he played football under future College Football Hall of Fame head coach Eddie Robinson in 1943 and 1944, during his junior and senior years in high school. Robinson would become Younger's college coach as well.

== College career ==
Younger attended Grambling College of Louisiana (now Grambling State University), where he was a two-way player on the school's football team at offensive tackle, running back and linebacker. Eddie Robinson coached Younger at Grambling from 1945 to 1948. Over his 55 years as Grambling's coach, Robinson sent numerous players on to play and star in the NFL, such as Pro Football Hall of Fame players Willie Davis, Buck Buchanan, Willie Brown and Charlie Joiner. Younger was Robinson's first star player.

Younger started off as an offensive tackle at Grambling, and coach Robinson would use Younger on end-around plays from the tackle position that often led to touchdowns. Robinson later came to recognize that Younger's skills better suited him to play running back. Younger also played linebacker on defense. In 1945, as a freshman, Younger led the nation in scoring with 25 touchdowns. It is reported that he scored 23 of these touchdowns from his tackle position, running on end-around plays. He helped lead Grambling to a 19–6 victory over Lane College in the January 1946 Flower Bowl.

Grambling's sports information director Collie Nicholson gave Younger the nickname "Tank". Nicholson said, “It was just after World War II . . . I was watching him run over everybody he couldn't run around. I'd been a Marine in the South Pacific, and it reminded me of what I saw those tanks doing down there”. He was also known as the "Grambling Galloper".

In his junior year (1947), Younger was a team co-captain. He rushed for 1,207 yards and scored 18 touchdowns, averaging 9.8 yards per carry. He also completed 43 of 73 pass attempts, including 11 passing touchdowns. Younger led all HBCU schools in scoring. His 1,207 rushing yards led all college rushers. Younger led Grambling to a victory over Bethune-Cookman in the December 1947 Lions Bowl, played in Ruston, Louisiana. He played in the January 1, 1948 Vulcan Bowl against Wilberforce State College (now Wilberforce University). During Grambling's 27–21 loss, Younger passed for a touchdown and had a touchdown reception. He was named to the Pittsburgh Courier All-America team for the 1947 college football season.

Defenses focused more on Younger during his senior season (1948). He still had 601 rushing yards on 72 carries (8.3 yards per carry), leading Grambling to the No. 2 ranking among black college teams. In a mid-November game against undefeated Prairie View, he led Grambling to a 34–12 win, scoring two rushing touchdowns (the 58th and 59th touchdowns of his college career). Grambling defeated Texas College, 26–20, in the December 1948 Lions Bowl; but Younger had a badly sprained ankle and was only in the game for a single play.

After his senior season in 1948, he was voted Black College Football's Player of the Year, and was again named a member of Pittsburgh Courier All-America team. When Younger graduated from Grambling, his NCAA career total of 60 touchdowns (scored mostly on punt returns and end-around plays) was an all-time record for touchdowns scored by a single player.

== Professional career ==
It has been stated that NFL teams generally did not scout at black colleges during the time Younger played at Grambling. The Los Angeles Rams and their scout Eddie Kotal were the exception, pioneering the scouting of black colleges. Kotal saw Younger play in the January 1, 1948 Vulcan Bowl. After the game, Kotal asked Younger if he had ever thought of playing professional football, to which Younger responded he had not. In 1949, Younger was drafted by the Brooklyn Dodgers of the All-America Football Conference, who later merged with the All-America Conference's New York Yankees. The Yankees, however, made no effort to sign Younger. He also had been contacted by the Rams and Detroit Lions, but went undrafted by any NFL team.

=== Los Angeles Rams ===
After Younger went undrafted by any NFL teams, Kotal, who had kept in contact with Younger, went to Grambling to pursue Younger into coming to play for the Rams. After meeting with Dr. Jones, coach Robinson and Younger, Younger signed with the Los Angeles Rams in 1949 as a free agent for $6,000 (a sum Robinson insisted upon, telling Kotal if the Rams did not think Younger was worth it they could cut him before the season started). Younger became the first NFL player from an HBCU school.

When playing in the South for exhibition games in 1949, Younger and his black teammates could not stay in the same hotels as their white teammates. Before one exhibition game in San Antonio, he was refused entry into the stadium, as it was not believable to those in charge that he could have been an NFL player. Younger did not experience any hostility from his Rams' teammates, which helped his transition into the NFL. Younger said that Rams' teammate Don Paul's acceptance and respectful treatment of Younger set the tone for the entire team's positive attitude towards him. In one game during the regular season early in Younger's career, an opposing defensive back kept making racial slurs and obscene gestures towards Younger after he would be tackled. Rams' teammate Dick Huffman, a 255 lb (115 kg) All-Pro offensive tackle told Younger to keep his cool and Huffman would take care of the situation. Huffman knocked the opposing player out of the game.

Younger made the team in 1949, and Rams' head coach Clark Shaughnessy started Younger at running back and linebacker in the first game of the Rams' 1949 season. He played at right halfback in 1949, starting eight games. As a rookie, he rushed for 191 yards on 52 carries, and caught seven passes for 119 yards. He played in the 1949 NFL Championship Game, won by the Philadelphia Eagles, 14–0. He caught one pass in that game.

In the second game of his career, against the Green Bay Packers, Younger was blocking on a running play when he was hit with a forearm in the face by the Packers' 6 ft 4 in (1.93 m) 290 lb (131.5 kg) Ed Neal, who was known for his particularly powerful arms and was considered arguably the strongest man in the NFL. At the time, NFL players did not wear any kind of face protection. There was no assertion reported that Neal did this with any intention to injure Younger. Younger's nose was seriously injured and he was badly bloodied. He was also knocked unconscious for a considerable time. It has been reported that violence of this play led to the Rams and then other NFL teams introducing the crossbar face mask into the league. Younger played the next week against the Chicago Bears, though reportedly without a face mask.

In 1950, now under head coach Joe Stydahar, Younger primarily played at left linebacker and only had eight rushing attempts, two of which were for touchdowns. He was one of the NFL's top linebackers that season. He was the starting right linebacker in the Rams 24–14 playoff victory over the Chicago Bears in 1950, and 30–28 loss to the Cleveland Browns in the 1950 NFL Championship Game. The Rams lost on a last-minute field goal.

In 1950, Younger also became part of the Rams renowned "Bull Elephant" backfield (with "Deacon" Dan Towler and Dick Hoerner). During a 1950 game on a muddy field, Stydahar got the idea to use the three big running backs simultaneously in the backfield. This formation became known as the Bull Elephant backfield; each runner weighing at least 225 pounds (102 kg) (or at least 220 lb in Hoerner's case). The 200 lb (90.7 kg) Rams' quarterback Bob Waterfield was sometimes included as part of the Bull Elephant backfield.

The Rams won the NFL championship in 1951. Younger played both running back on offense and left linebacker on defense that season, averaging 50 minutes per game. He had 223 yards on 36 rushing attempts (6.2 yards per carry) with one rushing touchdown; and 72 receiving yards on five receptions. Younger also had one interception that season. Younger was selected to play in the January 1952 NFL All-Star Game (later known as the Pro Bowl), and was named first-team All-Pro at linebacker by the Associated Press (AP).

Each of the three Bull Elephants averaged over six yards per carry in 1951. The Rams defeated the Cleveland Browns 24–17 in the 1951 NFL Championship Game, with Younger rushing for 20 yards, Towler for 36 yards (with one touchdown) and Hoerner for five yards (with one touchdown). This was the last game for the Bull Elephants as a trio, with Hoerner being traded to the Dallas Texans before the 1952 season.

In 1952, Younger played at fullback and left linebacker. He rushed for 331 yards on 63 carries, with one touchdown; and had 73 yards on 12 receptions. He had two interceptions on defense. He was again selected to play in the Pro Bowl, and was named second-team All-Pro by United Press International (UPI). In 1953, Younger was primarily used at fullback. He started five games, and rushed for 350 yards in 84 carries, with eight rushing touchdowns. He also had 259 yards on 20 receptions, with one receiving touchdown. He was selected for the third consecutive year to play in the Pro Bowl.

In 1954, Younger had his best rushing season to date in his career. He rushed for a team-leading 610 yards, and his 6.7 yards per carry average was a career-high and led all NFL runners that season. He played in and started only eight games that season, missing the last four games after suffering a season-ending dislocated knee during a November game against the Chicago Cardinals. He rushed the ball only four times in that game, including a 75-yard touchdown run, before the season-ending injury. Younger rushed for over 100 yards in each of the three preceding games, including a 186-yard game against the Chicago Bears and a 140-yard game against the Detroit Lions. While he could not play in the Pro Bowl because of this injury, he was still selected second-team All-Pro by the AP and UPI, as a running back.

In 1955, Younger missed four games with a dislocated wrist and a neck injury. He started seven of the eight games in which he appeared. Younger had career highs in rushing yards (644) and carries (138). He also had five rushing touchdowns. He led the NFL with a 80.5 yards per game rushing average. However, his yards per carry went from 6.7 in 1954 to 4.7 in 1955. After missing the 1954 Pro Bowl because of injury, he was selected to play in the Pro Bowl for the fourth time in five years in 1955. The Rams reached the 1955 NFL Championship Game, once again playing the Cleveland Browns, in a 38–14 loss; with the injured Younger unable to play in the game.

In 1956, Younger started 10 of the 12 games in which he appeared. He rushed for 518 yards on 4.5 yards per carry, with three rushing touchdowns. He also had 268 receiving yards on 18 receptions. His 786 total yards from scrimmage was a career high. In 1957, he started eight games, rushing for 401 yards, with a 4.2 yards per carry average and three rushing touchdowns. He had eight receptions for 61 yards. This was his final season with the Rams.

Younger played 100 games with the Rams over nine years. He is the tenth-leading rusher in Rams history with 3,296 yards (through 2025). He averaged 4.7 yards per carry, with 34 rushing touchdowns. He had 84 receptions for 979 yards. He also had three interceptions.

=== Pittsburgh Steelers ===
In July 1958, the Rams traded Younger to the Pittsburgh Steelers for a high draft choice. Rams general manager Pete Rozelle stated that Younger was in good physical condition, but the Rams had an abundance of talented running backs. During his one season with the Steelers, Younger started seven games. He had 344 rushing yards, with a 3.9 yards per carry average and three rushing touchdowns. He also had 16 receptions for 188 yards. Younger retired after his one season with the Steelers. He has stated, "I could have played two or three more years . . . but football always was a fun game to me. When I got to the point where football was no longer fun, I quit".

In his ten-year professional career with the Rams and the Steelers, Younger was named to the Pro Bowl four times (1951, 1952, 1953, and 1955), rushed for 3,640 yards on 770 carries, caught 100 passes for 1,167 yards, scored 35 touchdowns (34 rushing, 1 receiving), and intercepted three passes on defense (also throwing an interception on his only NFL pass attempt in 1957). He was said to be 6 ft 3 in (1.91 m) 225 lb (102 kg) during his NFL career.

== Football scout and executive ==
After his playing career, Younger reportedly worked for the Rams from 1959 to 1975. He reportedly became a part-time scout for the Rams in 1964, before becoming a fulltime scout in 1967. He later became a player personnel specialist for the Rams. Younger became the NFL's first black assistant general manager in 1975, with the San Diego Chargers, a position he held through December 30, 1986 when the Chargers let him go. During that time the Chargers won four division titles. Younger returned to the Rams in June 1987 as an "administrative assistant-consultant", originally hired to assist in contract negotiations and personnel evaluation. Younger retired from the Rams in 1995 after holding a variety of administrative positions.

In 1972, Younger was the Rams' representative at the induction of Eddie Kotal into the University of Wisconsin–Stevens Point S Club Hall of Fame. Younger honored Kotal for Kotal's contributions in bringing African American players into the NFL.

== Legacy and honors ==
Younger was the first black player from an HBCU college to play in the NFL. Younger recalled that on leaving Grambling for the NFL, coach "Robinson told me I had to make it. He told me if I failed, black college football would fail". Robinson considered Younger the best football player among all the black college players, and if the best of the black college players could not make an NFL team, it could be used as an excuse to exclude players from black schools in the future. Younger and Robinson worked together during the summer of 1949 to get Younger in the best physical and mental condition of his life, in preparation for the Rams' 1949 training camp, and making the Rams' roster. Years later, Robinson chose Younger to present him for Robinson's induction into the Louisiana Sports Hall of Fame.

Jack Teele, like Younger a Chargers and Rams team executive, in describing Younger's place as a pioneering black player in the NFL said Younger "was perfectly suited to play such a role. To Tank, racial differences really didn’t exist much; you were either a good guy or a bad guy". Grambling and future NFL Hall of Fame defensive end Willie Davis said that for the black players from HBCU schools following Younger into the NFL "the identity and awareness of players (from Historically Black Colleges and Universities) was well established basically by Tank Younger's performance".

Younger became the first black player to play in an NFL All-Star Game (the Pro Bowl). He was the last NFL player to have been selected an All-Pro as both an offensive and defensive player (at linebacker and running back). Younger became the league's first black executive (with the Rams) and first black assistant general manager (with the San Diego Chargers). He reportedly was in the NFL as a player, scout and/or executive for 46 years.

In 1989, the Los Angeles Football Classic Foundation created the Paul "Tank" Younger Award to honor players who attended HBCU schools and gained prominence in the NFL. The first recipient was Hall of Fame receiver Jerry Rice. The Fritz Pollard Alliance also presents a Paul "Tank" Younger Award for promoting diversity and equality in the NFL. The award is given annually to "the persons who have displayed outstanding work throughout the years both on and off the field in helping to level the playing field in the NFL".

In 2000, Younger was inducted into the College Football Hall of Fame. In 1999, he was the first African American inducted into the Louisiana Sports Hall of Fame. In 1993, Younger and Walter Payton were the two running backs named to the black college football 100th-year all-star team. In 2010, he was included as an inaugural member of the Black College Football Hall of Fame. In 1969, the Louisiana Sportswriters Association selected Younger to the Louisiana Collegiate All-Time Football Team.

Although his Grambling No. 22 had not been officially at the time of his death in 2001, no Grambling player had been assigned that number since Younger graduated. After his death in September 2001, each of Grambling's players wore the No. 22 on their helmets to honor Younger.

The Professional Football Researchers Association named Younger to the PRFA Hall of Very Good Class of 2007. In 2025, he was one of the players under consideration for induction into the Pro Football Hall of Fame in the Seniors category, but was not selected. Sportscaster and commentator Howard Cossell said of Younger "His heroics have never been properly recognized . . . He opened the door to a new talent source and gave pro football a new dimension. Tank Younger was a great player . . . No matter what criteria they use in the selection process, the NFL has diluted its Hall of Fame in bypassing Younger". Sportswriter and Grambling documentarian Jerry Izenberg wrote after Younger's death "Ironically he is not a member of the Pro Football Hall of Fame, to the everlasting shame of the voters. One can only guess that most of them do not understand that without Tank there might not have been a Junious "Buck" Buchanan, a Willie Davis, a Walter Payton, an Otis Taylor and so many others". In addition Cossell and Izenberg, Younger's inclusion in the Hall of Fame has been supported by, among others, Pulitzer Prize winner Jim Murray, Hall of Fame writer Murray Olderman, Beano Cook, and Brad Pye.

== Personal life and death ==
Younger was drafted into the United States Army in January 1951. Younger was known for his humor, friendly and gregarious nature towards people from all walks of life, and affection for children. Younger's wife Lucille was a pediatrician.

Younger died of cancer on September 15, 2001, in Inglewood, California. He was survived by Lucille Younger and their three children.

== NFL career statistics ==
Legend
	Won the NFL championship
	Led the league
**Bold**	Career high

=== Regular season ===
Year	Team	Games		Rushing					Receiving				
Year	Team	GP	GS	Att	Yds	Avg	Lng	TD	Rec	Yds	Avg	Lng	TD
1949	RAM	12	8	52	191	3.7	16	0	7	119	**17.0**	33	0
1950	RAM	12	12	8	28	3.5	6	2	0	0	0.0	0	0
1951	RAM	12	12	36	223	6.2	24	1	5	72	14.4	52	0
1952	RAM	12	12	63	331	5.3	38	1	12	73	6.1	12	0
1953	RAM	12	3	84	350	4.2	39	**8**	**20**	259	13.0	48	**1**
1954	RAM	8	8	91	610	**6.7**	**75**	**8**	8	76	9.5	21	0
1955	RAM	8	7	**138**	**644**	4.7	54	5	6	51	8.5	13	0
1956	RAM	12	10	114	518	4.5	33	3	18	**268**	14.9	**54**	0
1957	RAM	12	9	96	401	4.2	29	3	8	61	7.6	16	0
1958	PIT	12	8	88	344	3.9	36	3	16	188	11.8	51	0
		112	89	770	3,640	4.7	75	34	100	1,167	11.7	54	1

=== Playoffs ===
Year	Team	Games		Rushing					Receiving				
Year	Team	GP	GS	Att	Yds	Avg	Lng	TD	Rec	Yds	Avg	Lng	TD
1949	RAM	1	0	0	0	0.0	0	0	**1**	**6**	**6.0**	**6**	0
1950	RAM	2	2	0	0	0.0	0	0	0	0	0.0	0	0
1951	RAM	1	1	**4**	**20**	**5.0**	**14**	0	0	0	0.0	0	0
1952	RAM	1	1	**4**	14	3.5	13	0	0	0	0.0	0	0
		5	4	8	34	4.3	14	0	1	6	6.0	6	0
