= Elroy Hirsch =

American football player and executive (1923–2004)

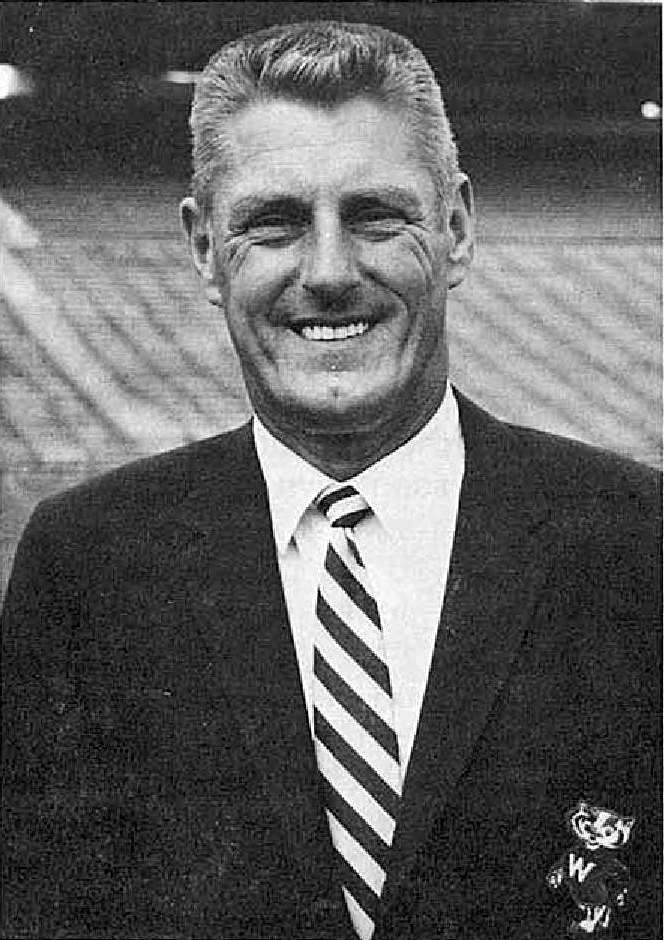
- Hirsch as Wisconsin's athletic director in 1977

No. 80, 40
- Positions: Halfback, end, flanker

Personal information
- Born: June 17, 1923; Wausau, Wisconsin, U.S.
- Died: January 28, 2004 (aged 80); Madison, Wisconsin, U.S.
- Listed height: 6 ft 2 in (1.88 m)
- Listed weight: 190 lb (86 kg)

Career information
- High school: Wausau
- College: Wisconsin (1941-1942); Michigan (1943-1944)
- NFL draft: 1945: 1st round, 5th overall pick

Career history

Playing
- Chicago Rockets (1946–1948); Los Angeles Rams (1949–1957)

Operations
- Los Angeles Rams (1960–1969) General manager; Wisconsin (1969–1987) Athletic director

Awards and highlights
- NFL champion (1951); 2× First-team All-Pro (1951, 1953); 3× Pro Bowl (1951–1953); NFL receptions leader (1951); NFL receiving yards leader (1951); NFL receiving touchdowns leader (1951); NFL scoring leader (1951); NFL 1950s All-Decade Team; NFL 50th Anniversary All-Time Team; NFL 100th Anniversary All-Time Team; St. Louis Football Ring of Fame; First-team All-Big Ten (1942); Second-team All-Big Ten (1943); Wisconsin Badgers No. 40 retired

Career NFL/AAFC statistics
- Receptions: 387
- Receiving yards: 7,029
- Receiving touchdowns: 60
- Stats at Pro Football Reference
- Pro Football Hall of Fame
- College Football Hall of Fame

Elroy Leon "Crazy Legs" Hirsch (June 17, 1923 – January 28, 2004) was an American professional football player, sport executive, and actor. He was inducted into the Pro Football Hall of Fame in 1968 and the College Football Hall of Fame in 1974. He was a first-team All-Pro in 1951 and 1953, was named to the National Football League (NFL) 1950s All-Decade Team and also was selected as a member of the NFL 50th Anniversary All-Time Team in 1969 and the NFL 100th Anniversary All-Time Team in 2019.

A native of Wausau, Wisconsin, Hirsch played college football as a halfback at the University of Wisconsin and the University of Michigan, helping to lead both the 1942 Badgers and the 1943 Wolverines to number-three rankings in the final AP Polls. He received the nickname "Crazylegs" (sometimes "Crazy Legs") for his unusual running style.

Hirsch served in the United States Marine Corps from 1944 to 1946 and then played professional football in the All-America Football Conference (AAFC) for the Chicago Rockets from 1946 to 1948 and in the NFL for the Los Angeles Rams from 1949 to 1957. During the 1951 season, Hirsch helped lead the Rams to the NFL championship and tied or broke multiple NFL records with 1,495 receiving yards, an average of 124.6 receiving yards per game (still the third-highest season average in NFL history), and 17 touchdown receptions.

Hirsch had a brief career as a motion picture actor in the 1950s and served as the general manager for the Rams from 1960 to 1969 and as the athletic director for the University of Wisconsin from 1969 to 1987.

== Early life ==
Hirsch was born in Wausau, Wisconsin in 1923. He was the adopted son of German-Norwegian parents, Otto and Mayme Hirsch. His father was a foreman in an iron works.

Hirsch was a star football player at Wausau High School in 1939 and 1940. He also played baseball and basketball in high school.

== College football ==
=== Wisconsin ===
Hirsch enrolled at the University of Wisconsin in the fall of 1941 and played on the school's freshman football team. As a sophomore, Hirsch starred as a halfback for the 1942 Wisconsin Badgers football team that compiled an 8–1–1 record, defeated reigning national champion Ohio State (17–7), lost only one game to Iowa (0–6), tied with Notre Dame (7–7), and was ranked No. 3 in the final AP Poll. At the end of the season, Hirsch was selected by the Associated Press (AP) as a first-team halfback on the 1942 All-Big Ten Conference football team. In the three years prior to 1942, Wisconsin's football team had gone 8–15–1, and the program had been in decline since 1932. During the 1942 season, Hirsch's only season with the Wisconsin football team, he was a triple-threat man who totaled 767 rushing yards on 141 carries, completed 18 passes for 226 yards, punted four times for an average of 48.8 yards, intercepted six passes, and returned 15 punts for 182 yards. He rushed for a high of 174 yards against Missouri.

=== Nickname ===
Hirsch acquired the "Crazylegs" nickname because of his unusual running style in which his legs twisted as he ran. According to one version, after watching Hirsch play in an October 17, 1942, game against the Great Lakes Navy Bluejackets, sportswriter Francis J. Powers of Chicago Daily News wrote: "His crazy legs were gyrating in six different directions, all at the same time; he looked like a demented duck." According to another version, he acquired the nickname in high school when fans in Wausau watched "the tall, slim Hirsch" run as "his legs seemed to whirl in several directions."

Hirsch's father later recalled: "We lived two miles from school. Elroy ran to school and back, skipping and crisscrossing his legs in the cement blocks of the sidewalks. He said it would make him shiftier." Hirsch himself recalled: "I've always run kind of funny because my left foot points out to the side and I seem to wobble." He embraced his nickname, saying in interviews, "Anything's better than 'Elroy'."

In the 1970s, Hirsch filed a lawsuit asserting legal ownership of the "Crazylegs" name. He sued S. C. Johnson & Son for its marketing a shaving gel for women's legs under the brand name "Crazylegs". In a 1997 decision, the Wisconsin Supreme Court held that Hirsch's complaint set forth a viable claim for invasion of Hirsch's common law right of privacy.

=== Michigan ===
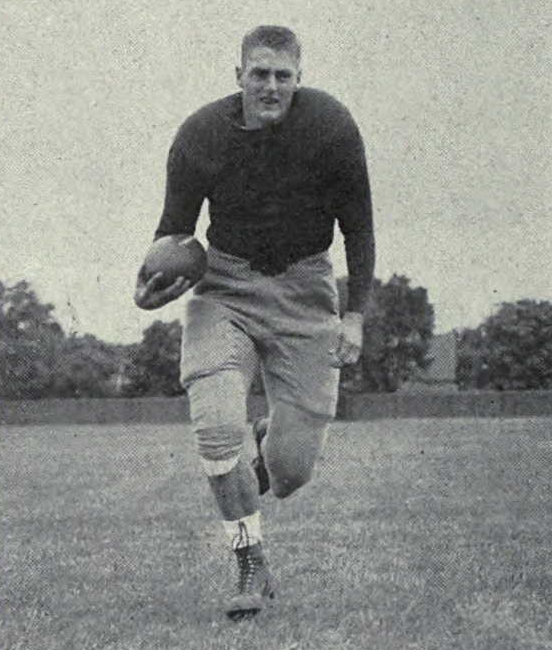
Hirsch from 1944 Michigan yearbook

In January 1943, Hirsch enlisted in the United States Marine Corps and was transferred to the University of Michigan as part of the V-12 Navy College Training Program. In early September 1943, he broke the record at Michigan's Marine Corps training center, completing a 344-yard obstacle course in one minute and 31 seconds. He was the starting left halfback in the first seven games of the season for Fritz Crisler's 1943 Michigan Wolverines football team that compiled an 8–1 record and was ranked No. 3 in the final AP Poll. After watching Hirsch in pre-season practice, Associated Press football writer Jerry Liska referred to "squirming Elroy Hirsch" as "Wisconsin's gold-plated wartime gift to Michigan." Hirsch and Bill Daley (a V-12 transfer from Minnesota) became Michigan's most powerful offensive weapons during the 1943 season and were dubbed Michigan's "lend-lease backs."

In his first game for Michigan, Hirsch returned the opening kickoff 50 yards, scored two touchdowns and intercepted a pass. He scored five touchdowns in Michigan's first three games and threw for a touchdown in the fourth game against Notre Dame. On October 11, 1943, Hirsch scored three touchdowns, including a 61-yard reverse around the right end, and intercepted a pass to help Michigan to its first victory over Minnesota since 1932. Due to a shoulder injury, he appeared only briefly as a backup to kick for extra points in the final two games of the season, but he still led the Wolverines in passing, punt returns, and scoring.

During the 1943–1944 academic year, Hirsch also won varsity letters in basketball (as a center), track (as a broad jumper), and baseball (as a pitcher), becoming the first Michigan athlete to letter in four sports in a single year. He averaged 7.3 points per game for the 1943–44 Michigan Wolverines men's basketball team, compiled a 6–0 record as a pitcher for the Michigan baseball team, placed third in the long jump in the 1944 indoor championship, and led all three teams to Big Ten Conference championships. On May 13, 1944, Hirsch starred in two sports in the same day, winning the broad jump with a distance of 24 feet, 2 1/4 inches at a track meet in Ann Arbor, Michigan, and then traveling to Columbus, Ohio, where he pitched a one-hitter to give Michigan's baseball team a 5–0 victory over Ohio State.

== Marine Corps ==
In June 1944, Hirsch and 23 other Michigan athletes were transferred to the Marine Corps Recruit Depot at Parris Island, South Carolina. In the fall of 1944, Hirsch was assigned to Marine Corps Base Camp Lejeune where he played for the base football team. In the spring of 1945, he was stationed at Marine Corps Base Quantico in Virginia. He was commissioned a second lieutenant in May 1945.

Hirsch remained with the Marine Corps in the fall of 1945 and played for the Marine Corps football team at the Marine Corps Air Station El Toro in California. In September 1945, he scored four touchdowns for the El Toro Flying Marines in a game against the Los Angeles Bulldogs.

== Professional football career ==
=== College All-Stars ===
Hirsch was discharged from the military in May 1946. On August 23, 1946, he led the college all-star team to a 16–0 victory over the NFL champion Los Angeles Rams in the Chicago College All-Star Game. Hirsch was named the game's outstanding player, and the Los Angeles Times described his performance in the game as a "one-man show" after he scored the game's only touchdowns, including a 68-yard touchdown sprint, for the college squad. Hirsch later described the game as his greatest athletic thrill.

=== Chicago Rockets ===
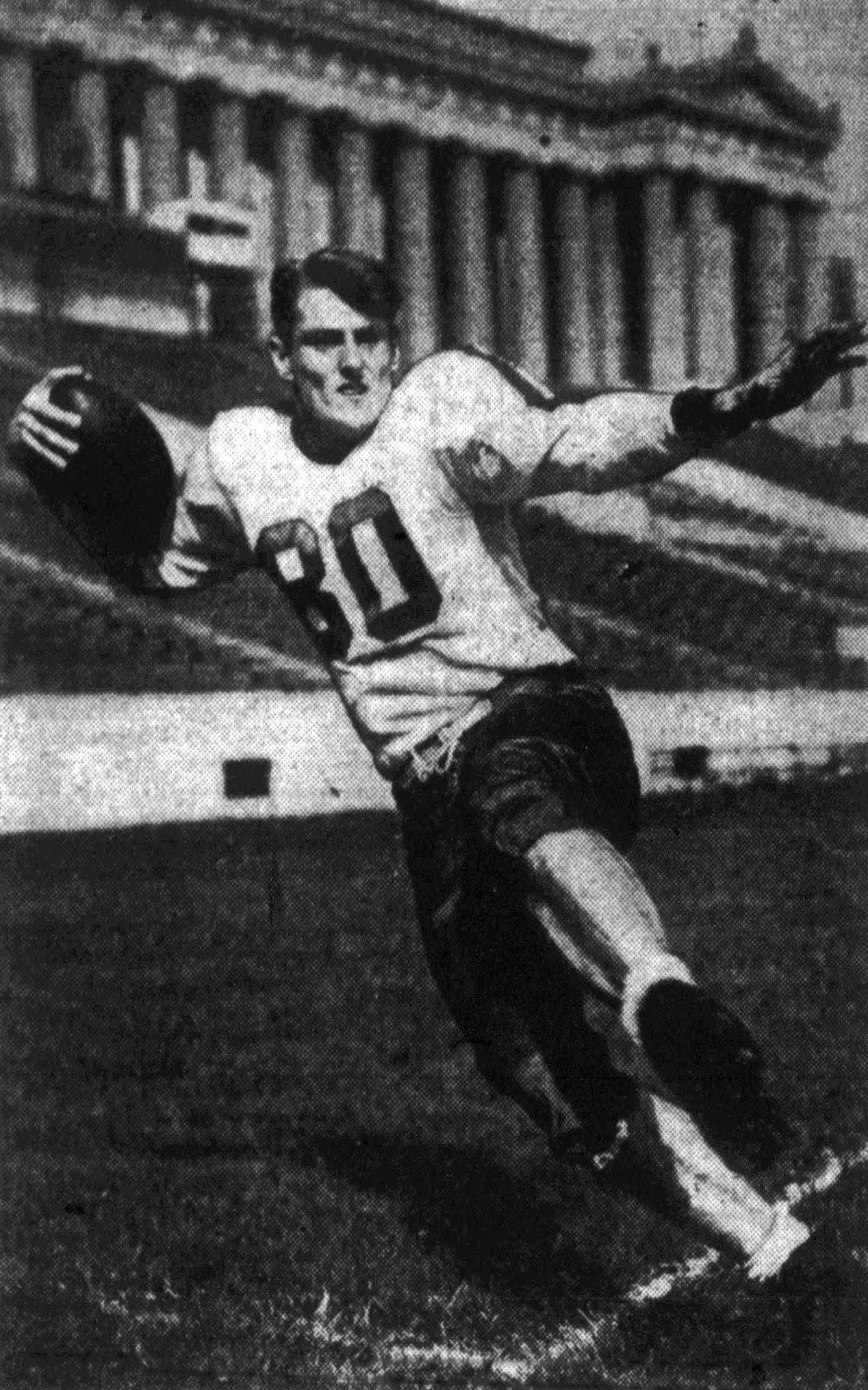
Hirsch at Soldier Field as a member of the Chicago Rockets in 1946

In January 1945, the Cleveland Rams selected Hirsch in the first round (fifth overall pick) of the 1945 NFL draft. In May, he announced that he would not sign a contract with the Rams, stating that he intended to return to the University of Wisconsin after his discharge from the military.

He ultimately opted not to play in the NFL, instead playing for the Chicago Rockets of the All-America Football Conference (AAFC). Hirsch chose the Rockets because they were coached by Dick Hanley, who had been Hirsch's coach with the El Toro Marines team. Hirsch played three seasons with the Rockets from 1946 to 1948. During those three years, the Rockets compiled a 7–32 record and won only one game in each of the 1947 and 1948 seasons. Hirsch later said the decision to sign with the Rockets was the worst decision he ever made.

In a remarkable display of versatility, Hirsch appeared in all 14 games for the Rockets in 1946, contributing 1,445 yards: 384 kickoff return yards and one touchdown; 347 receiving yards and three receiving touchdowns; 235 punt return yards and one touchdown; 226 rushing yards and one rushing touchdown; 156 passing yards and one passing touchdown; and 97 return yards on six interceptions.

In September 1947, Hirsch caught a 76-yard touchdown pass for an AAFC record. However, injuries limited Hirsch to five games in 1947. He was described in December 1947 as probably "the highest paid waterboy in pro football."

In the fifth game of the 1948 season, Hirsch sustained a fracture on the right side of his skull after being kicked in the head during a game against the Cleveland Browns. Hirsch did not return to action during the 1948 season, totaling 101 receiving yards and 93 rushing yards in five games.

=== Los Angeles Rams ===
In June 1949, Hirsch alleged that the Hornets (the Chicago Rockets were renamed the Hornets in 1949) had breached a contractual obligation to pay him a bonus and sought a release to allow him to play for the Green Bay Packers. However, the Los Angeles Rams held Hirsch's NFL rights having selected him in the 1945 NFL Draft, and Hirsch was therefore unable to sign with the Packers. Instead, he signed with the Rams in July 1949. Hirsch earned $20,000 a year from the Rams, following a bidding war with the Hornets. However, after the 1949 season, the AAFC folded, and the Rams reduced his salary with the competition from the AAFC gone. During his career with the Rams, Hirsch never again attained the salary level he was paid as a rookie.

Rams head coach Clark Shaughnessy played Hirsch at the end position. In his first game for the Rams, a 27–24 victory over the Detroit Lions, Hirsch scored two touchdowns, including a 19-yard touchdown reception from Norm Van Brocklin. Over the course of the 1949 season, Hirsch tallied 326 receiving yards, 287 rushing yards, and 55 return yards on two interceptions. During the 1949 season, Hirsch also became one of the first NFL players to wear a plastic helmet. After Hirsch sustained a second head injury (having previously suffered a skull fracture in 1948), Rams coach Shaughnessy had a special, 11-ounce helmet designed for Hirsch, using a strong, light plastic that had been used previously in the construction of fighter planes.

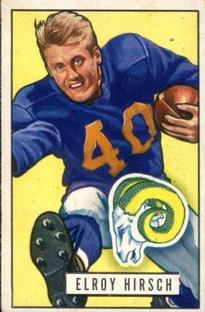
1951 Bowman card of Hirsch

In the opening game of the 1951 season, Norm Van Brocklin passed for an NFL record 554 yards, including 173 yards and four touchdown passes to Hirsch. During the season, Hirsch, Van Brocklin, Bob Waterfield, and Tom Fears (all four of whom have been inducted into the Pro Football Hall of Fame) led the Rams to an 8–4 record and a victory over the Cleveland Browns in the 1951 NFL Championship Game. Easily the best year of his career, Hirsch tied or broke multiple NFL receiving records in 1951. These records include:

- Hirsch set a new NFL record with 1,495 receiving yards. Despite the fact that the NFL season consisted of only 12 games in 1951, Hirsch's single-season receiving record stood for nearly 20 years, until the merger of the AFL and the NFL.
- Hirsch's average of 124.6 receiving yards per game also set a new NFL record. Through the end of the 2015 NFL season, only two players have exceeded this record.
- Hirsch also had 17 touchdown receptions in 1951, tying an NFL record set by Don Hutson in 1942. Despite the expansion of the NFL schedule to 16 games, the Hirsch/Hutson mark of 17 touchdown catches lasted until the 1980s, and only four players through the end of the 2015 NFL season have exceeded the mark.
- On his 17 touchdown catches, Hirsch averaged 51.2 yards, including a 91-yard reception that was the longest of the year in the NFL. For this reason, Bob Oates of the Los Angeles Times wrote that, even in the era of Jerry Rice, Hirsch "remains the greatest long-distance receiving threat of all time."
- Hirsch's 66 receptions also led the NFL in 1951 and was the fifth highest total in NFL history to that date.

After the 1951 season, Hirsch finished second behind Otto Graham in voting conducted by the United Press (UP) for the NFL Player of the Year award. He was also selected as a first-team All-Pro player by both the Associated Press (AP) and the UP. He was also selected to play in the Pro Bowl each year from 1951 to 1953. Hirsch had another strong season in 1953, leading the NFL with a career-high average of 23.6 yards per reception. He also finished second in the NFL with 941 receiving yards in 1953 and was selected as a first-team All-Pro by the AP and a second-team All-Pro by the UP.

Hirsch continued to play for the Rams through the 1957 season. He announced his retirement as a player at age 34 in January 1958. In nine years with the Rams, Hirsch totaled 343 receptions for 6,299 yards and 53 touchdowns. He also gained 317 rushing yards with the Rams.

== NFL and AAFC career statistics ==
Legend
	Led the league
	NFL champion
**Bold**	Career high

=== Regular season ===
Year	Team	Games	Receiving					Rushing					Fumbles
Year	Team	GP	Rec	Yds	Avg	Lng	TD	Att	Yds	Avg	Lng	TD	Fumbles
1946	CHR	**14**	27	347	12.9	68	3	**87**	226	2.6	—	**1**	0
1947	CHR	5	10	282	**28.2**	76	3	23	51	2.2	—	**1**	0
1948	CHR	5	7	101	14.4	—	1	23	93	4.0	—	0	0
1949	LAR	12	22	326	14.8	48	4	68	**287**	4.2	**51**	**1**	**4**
1950	LAR	12	42	687	16.4	58	7	2	19	**9.5**	15	0	0
1951	LAR	12	**66**	**1,495**	22.7	**91**	**17**	1	3	3.0	3	0	0
1952	LAR	10	25	590	23.6	84	4	0	0	—	—	0	0
1953	LAR	12	61	941	15.4	70	4	1	-6	-6.0	-6	0	2
1954	LAR	12	35	720	20.6	66	3	1	6	6.0	6	0	1
1955	LAR	9	25	460	18.4	72	2	0	0	—	—	0	0
1956	LAR	12	35	603	17.2	76	6	0	0	—	—	0	0
1957	LAR	12	32	477	14.9	45	6	1	8	8.0	8	0	0
Career		127	387	7029	18.9	91	60	207	687	3.3	51	3	7

== Television, radio, and movie career ==
Poster for the 1953 film Crazylegs

After retiring from football, Hirsch accepted a job with Union Oil to replace Bob Richards as the sports director of Union Oil Co.'s 76 Sports Club and the host of its Thursday evening sports television show. He also hosted a daily sports commentary show on KNX radio from 1961 to 1967.

During the 1950s, Hirsch also starred in several motion pictures, including the following:

- Crazylegs, a motion picture released in November 1953 focusing on Hirsch's life as a football player at Wausau High School and the Universities of Wisconsin and Michigan. Hirsch played himself as the lead in the film. Los Angeles Times movie critic John L. Scott wrote of Hirsch's performance: "Hirsch as an actor is both likable and believable. He does very well in his first film assignment." Hirsch's appearance in Crazylegs has been credited with expanding his fame beyond sports fans and making him "a star in the eyes of the general public."
- Unchained, a prison drama released in July 1955 and shot at a correctional facility in Chino, California. Hirsch played the lead as a prisoner in a prison without bars or armed guards. In the film, Hirsch's character planned an escape but changed his mind due to the influence of another prisoner. The film is notable for introducing its theme song, "Unchained Melody" which was sung by Todd Duncan.
- Zero Hour!, an airline disaster movie released in November 1957. Hirsch played the role of the pilot who became incapacitated (along with the co-pilot and many passengers) after eating tainted fish served as part of the flight's meal service. Zero Hour! was later used as the basis (including much of the original dialogue) for the Zucker brothers' parody film Airplane! (1980), with Kareem Abdul-Jabbar playing the co-pilot.

Hirsch also appeared as himself in a 1956 episode of the Captain Midnight television series in a spot advertising Ovaltine milk flavoring. He was also featured in 1965 in episode 29 of The Munsters television show, entitled "Herman the Rookie." In his appearance, he is seen on the street discussing the Rams' need for a punter when a football kicked by Herman hits him in the face.

== Administrative career ==
=== Los Angeles Rams ===
In March 1960, Hirsch signed a three-year contract to serve as the general manager of the Los Angeles Rams; he replaced Pete Rozelle as the Rams' general manager after Rozelle was hired as NFL commissioner. The Rams began the 1960s in the lower tier of the NFL, compiling a losing record each year from 1959 to 1965. As general manager, he was in charge of scouting, the college draft, and negotiating player and coach contracts. During his tenure as general manager, the team drafted numerous talented players, including quarterback Roman Gabriel (first-round pick in 1961), Deacon Jones (14th-round pick in 1961), and Merlin Olsen (first-round pick in 1962), player who helped the Rams improve to 11–1–2 in 1967 and 10–3–1 in 1968. In 1963, after Dan Reeves acquired outright ownership of the Rams, Hirsch's title was changed to assistant to the president. He continued to serve as Reeves' assistant through the 1968 season.

=== University of Wisconsin ===
In February 1969, Hirsch was hired away from the Rams to serve as the athletic director at the University of Wisconsin. Within four years, he had raised home attendance at football games from an average of 43,000 to 70,000 per game. During his tenure as athletic director, the number of sports offered by the UW athletics department doubled and the Badgers won national titles in ice hockey, men's and women's crew, and men's and women's cross country. However, the program also had problems with recruiting violations and a fundraising controversy. Hirsch announced his resignation as Wisconsin's athletic director in December 1986; the resignation became effective at the end of June 1987. In July 1987, he was hired to do color commentary on radio broadcasts of Wisconsin football games.

== Legacy and honors ==
During his pro football career, Hirsch had 387 receptions for 7,029 yards and 60 touchdowns. In a film profile of Hirsch produced by the NFL Films, Michael MacCambridge, author of America's Game, described Hirsch as "the first true flanker deep threat" and stated:

We talk today about yards after the catch, but he would get acres of yards after the catch because he was so elusive in the open field. When the ball was up in the air, he looked like Willie Mays in center field. He could adjust and wind up catching the ball over his shoulder in stride about as well as anyone. If you take a look at the offensive stats in pro football then, he was not just the best in the league, he was head and shoulders above his competitors.

NFL executive Bill Granholm recalled that it was Hirsch's ability to make the overhead or over-the-shoulder catch that set him apart: "He would run down the field with his chin high in the air – with his head all the way back. Under a long pass, he didn't look left or right as they do today – he looked up and back at the ball as it came to him over his head... [H]e put his head between the ball and the defensive back. That's how he caught so many bombs."

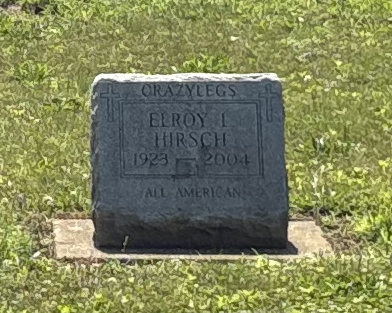
Hirsch's grave at Pine Grove Cemetery

Hirsch was inducted into both the Pro Football Hall of Fame (inducted 1968) and the College Football Hall of Fame (inducted 1974). In September 1969, at the time of the NFL's 50th anniversary, Hirsch was one of 16 players named to the all-time All-Pro team selected by the Pro Football Hall of Fame. He was also named to the NFL's 1950s All-Decade Team (as a flanker) in August 1969. He has also received many other honors, including the following:

- He was inducted into the Wisconsin Athletic Hall of Fame in 1964.
- In January 1983, Hirsch tossed the honorary coin at the start of Super Bowl XVII. He was the third former player to be so honored, following Red Grange and Bobby Layne.
- Hirsch was inducted into the University of Michigan Athletic Hall of Honor in 1984.
- In September 1986, Hirsch was selected by Los Angeles fans as a first-team receiver on the Rams' All-Time Team. He received the seventh highest total in the voting.
- In September 1987, Oakland Avenue, a short street located just south of Camp Randall Stadium in Madison, Wisconsin, was renamed "Crazylegs Lane" in Hirsch's honor.
- In November 1987, the University of Wisconsin retired Hirsch's jersey number 40. Hirsch's jersey was only the third to be retired at Wisconsin.
- In July 1988, Hirsch was inducted into the National High School Sports Hall of Fame based on his accomplishments as a football and basketball player at Wausau High School.
- In August 1999, Hirsch was ranked number 89 on The Sporting News' list of the 100 Greatest Football Players.
- In May 2005, Hirsch was honored with a bronze plaque in the Los Angeles Memorial Coliseum's "Court of Honor".
- In 2021, The Athletic listed him as the 94th greatest player ever.

Hirsch is also the namesake of the Crazylegs Classic, an annual eight-kilometer running race from the Wisconsin State Capitol to Camp Randall Stadium with proceeds benefiting the University of Wisconsin athletics programs.

== Family and later years ==
Hirsch married his high school sweetheart, Ruth Stahmer (1923–2011), in June 1946. They remained married until Hirsch's death 58 years later. They had a son, Win Steven (1949–2009), and a daughter, Patricia Caroline (later Patricia Hirsch-Malmquist), born in approximately 1957.

Hirsch died of natural causes at an assisted living home in Madison, Wisconsin in January 2004 at age 80. He was buried at Pine Grove Cemetery in Wausau.
