= Dick Hoerner =

American football player (1922–2010)

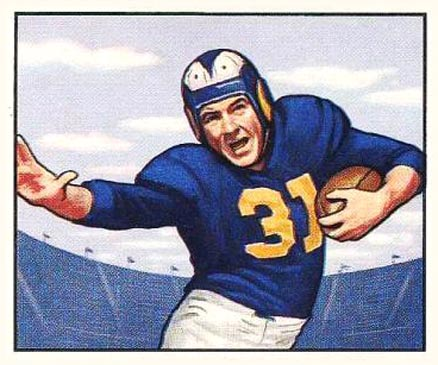
- Hoerner on a 1950 Bowman football card

No. 31
- Position: Fullback

Personal information
- Born: July 25, 1922; Dubuque, Iowa, U.S.
- Died: December 11, 2010 (aged 88); Fullerton, California, U.S.
- Listed height: 6 ft 4 in (1.93 m)
- Listed weight: 220 lb (100 kg)

Career information
- High school: Dubuque
- College: Iowa (1942, 1946)
- NFL draft: 1945: 17th round, 169th overall pick

Career history
- Los Angeles Rams (1947–1951); Dallas Texans (1952)

Awards and highlights
- NFL champion (1951); Second-team All-Pro (1950); Pro Bowl (1950); First-team All-Big Nine (1946)

Career NFL statistics
- Rushing yards: 2,172
- Rushing average: 4.3
- Receptions: 80
- Receiving yards: 1,180
- Total touchdowns: 34
- Stats at Pro Football Reference

Lester Junior "Dick" Hoerner (July 25, 1922 – December 11, 2010) was an American professional football player who was a fullback for the Los Angeles Rams of the National Football League (NFL) from 1947 to 1951. He played college football for the Iowa Hawkeyes in 1942 and 1946. He helped lead the Rams to three consecutive NFL championship games from 1949 to 1951, played for the 1951 Los Angeles Rams team that won the 1951 NFL Championship Game, and was selected to play in the inaugural 1951 Pro Bowl. He was the Rams' all-time leading rusher at the end of his playing career with the team. He concluded his professional football career as a member of the Dallas Texans in 1952.

== Iowa ==
A native of Dubuque, Iowa, Hoerner was a state track champion while attending Dubuque High School. He also led Dubuque to Mississippi Valley Conference championships in 1939 and 1940 and was twice selected as an All-Iowa player. He enrolled at the University of Iowa in 1941 and played for the Iowa Hawkeyes football team as a sophomore in 1942. He ran 88 yards for a touchdown against Fritz Crisler's 1942 Michigan Wolverines. In May 1943, Hoerner was inducted into the U.S. Army. After missing three years due to war-time service, including service overseas in the field artillery, Hoerner returned to the Hawkeyes football team in 1946.

== Los Angeles Rams ==
Hoerner was selected by the Los Angeles Rams in the 17th round of the 1945 NFL draft and played for the team from 1947 through 1951. After he signed with the Rams, the Los Angeles Times touted his potential: "When you find a 6-foot, 4-inch, 220-pounder that can move, you have something. But when you run across one who is downright fast, can handle himself like a 160-pounder and can kick and pass to boot, they you have Lester (Dick) Hoerner, the Los Angeles Rams' great fullback prospect." As a rookie in 1947, he was sidelined by a broken foot in an October 1947 game against the Chicago Cardinals. In 1948, Hoerner was the Ram's leading rusher with 354 yards and average of 4.7 yards per carry that ranked 4th in the NFL. In a November 1948 game against the New York Giants, he tied a club record with three rushing touchdowns and was described as "unstoppable." Hoerner also played linebacker for the Rams. In December 1948, the Los Angeles Times wrote that Hoerner was a "6 foot 4 inch speedster" and "a murderous line backer."

In June 1949, Hoerner signed a 1949 contract with the Rams. The Los Angeles Times reported that he was both the fastest man on the team and "by far the hardest hitting." The Times noted that Hoerner had been "coveted by more rival National Football League clubs than any other member of the Los Angeles Rams." He helped lead the Rams to the 1949 NFL Championship Game, led all fullbacks in rushing during the 1949 NFL season and ranked among the league's leaders in rushing yards (6th, 582 yards) and yards from scrimmage (7th, 795 yards).

In 1950, Hoerner helped lead the Rams to their second consecutive NFL championship game. He scored 11 touchdowns, the second highest total in the NFL, and was selected to play in the inaugural 1951 Pro Bowl. He also totaled 827 yards from scrimmage in 1950, with 381 rushing yards and 446 receiving yards. In November 1950, Frank Finch of the Los Angeles Times wrote: "Many stars have twinkled for the Rams this season, but none more brilliantly than Dick Hoerner. Off the field the 220-yard Ram fullback wears glasses, but on the field he wears a mean expression with a disposition to match." In the 1950 NFL Championship Game, Hoerner scored two touchdowns and accounted for 86 of the Rams' 106 rushing yards, but the Rams lost in a close game to the Cleveland Browns by the score of 30–28. After the 1950 season, the Los Angeles Times wrote that, although he had been dogged by injuries in 1947 and 1948, "the giant Hoerner has been probably the hardest running fullback in the league since."

In his final year with the Rams, Hoerner helped lead the 1951 Rams to the NFL championship as part of the Rams' famed "Bull Elephant" backfield along with Paul "Tank" Younger and "Deacon" Dan Towler. Hoerner rushed for 569 yards in 1951, ranking 7th in the NFL. He also averaged 6.1 yards per carry, the 4th best average in the league, and scored a touchdown in the 1951 NFL Championship Game against the Cleveland Browns. Tank Younger, who in 1949 became the first NFL player from a historically black college, recalled that Hoerner pitched in unselfishly to help Younger learn Clark Shaughnessy's offensive system, even though they were both competing for the same position. Interviewed in 1970, Younger noted, "I used to go up to Dick's room every afternoon to study the offensive formation and the terminology. Dick helped me a great deal."

After five seasons with the Rams, Hoerner was the team's all-time career leader with 2,020 rushing yards. He also held the Rams' record for most rushing attempts in a season (455 attempts in 1949) and ranked second in team history in touchdowns scored in a single season behind Elroy "Crazy Legs" Hirsch.

== Dallas Texans ==
In June 1952, Hoerner was traded to the Dallas Texans as part of an 11-for-1 deal that sent Les Richter to the Rams. The trade was described as "unquestionably the biggest shift of pigskin personnel in National Football League history." When Hoerner returned to Los Angeles as a member of the Texans, he expressed his desire to prove that the Rams had erred in trading him:

"Hoerner gladly would sacrifice his right arm all the way up to the armpit to squash a few Rams and score a couple of touchdowns by way of informing the Ram high command that they were plain loco when they cut him loose. And as an added incentive to make his personal crusade, the terrible-tempered neo-Texan has all the warm affection for his old backfield coach, J. Hampton Pool, that a cobra has for a mongoose."

The Texans compiled a record of 1–11–0 in 1952, and Hoerner rushed for 162 yards and a career-low 2.9 yards per carry. After only one season, the Dallas Texans moved to Baltimore to become the Colts, and Hoerner signed in the spring of 1953 with the Detroit Lions. However, Hoerner retired from football in July 1953 before appearing in any regular season games with the Lions.

== NFL career statistics ==
Legend
	Won the NFL championship
	Led the league
**Bold**	Career high

=== Regular season ===
Year	Team	Games		Rushing					Receiving				
Year	Team	GP	GS	Att	Yds	Avg	Lng	TD	Rec	Yds	Avg	Lng	TD
1947	RAM	4	0	30	124	4.1	23	2	1	20	**20.0**	20	0
1948	RAM	12	5	76	354	4.7	23	4	18	227	12.6	45	**2**
1949	RAM	12	12	**155**	**582**	3.8	37	6	17	213	12.5	29	0
1950	RAM	12	11	95	381	4.0	**64**	**10**	**26**	**446**	17.2	48	1
1951	RAM	12	10	94	569	**6.1**	43	6	8	102	12.8	21	1
1952	DTX	11	5	56	162	2.9	14	2	10	172	17.2	**54**	0
		63	43	506	2,172	4.3	64	30	80	1,180	14.8	54	4

=== Playoffs ===
Year	Team	Games		Rushing					Receiving				
Year	Team	GP	GS	Att	Yds	Avg	Lng	TD	Rec	Yds	Avg	Lng	TD
1949	RAM	1	1	7	10	1.4	-	0	**1**	**19**	**19.0**	**19**	0
1950	RAM	2	2	**31**	**104**	**3.4**	**24**	**2**	**1**	9	9.0	9	0
1951	RAM	1	1	5	5	1.0	4	1	**1**	13	13.0	13	0
		4	4	43	119	2.8	24	3	3	41	13.7	19	0

== Later life ==
After retiring from football, Hoerner went into business in Southern California where he specialized in turning around struggling businesses, taking them "out of the red and into the black." Hoerner died in December 2010 at age 88 after suffering a stroke. He was survived by his wife, Kathy, daughters, Cecilia Hoerner, Leslie Hoerner, and Louise Hubbard, five grandchildren and four great-grandchildren.
