= Bull Elephant backfield =

American football running back group

The "Bull Elephant" backfield were the American football running backs of the 1950s Los Angeles Rams. The line consisted of Dick Hoerner, Paul "Tank" Younger and "Deacon" Dan Towler. This line helped name the 1951 Rams as the fourth best offense in the history of the NFL and the number one best offense in the history of the NFL for the 1950 Rams by Sports Central.

Towler and Hirsch noted the success of the idea in later years. Tower recalled years later: "The idea for the Bull Elephants came during the 1950 season. We were playing in a sea of mud and the coaches alternated backfields hoping to rest us. The coach then realized he had three fullbacks of equal running ability and saw what a powerful weapon he would have with two 200-pounders leading a third."

Hirsch added: "I'll never forget the picture we created with the Bulls' plays -- like one we called 27-M-Sockem. I took the defensive end outside, the tackle turned the defensive tackle in, and Hoerner and Younger, shoulder to shoulder, flew head-on at the linebacker, with Towler, shifty as a scatback, carrying the ball behind them. It was an awesome sight and good for 15 yards almost any time."
