= 1951 All-Pro Team =

Official list of the best NFL players in 1951

The 1951 All-Pro Team consisted of American football players in the National Football League (NFL) chosen as best at their position for the 1951 NFL season. Several rival journalistic organizations named All-Pro teams in 1951, there was no official league honor by that designation.

== Background ==
The 1951 NFL All-Pro Team is something of a misnomer. This was not an official league-sponsored honor, nor was the team a single entity. In fact, several different rival journalistic institutions — all independent of the NFL — each named their own All-Pro Teams following the conclusion of play in the 1951 NFL season.

The first of the three most important 1951 All-Pro teams was announced on December 19 by the United Press (UP). With the NFL's permanent adoption of the free substitution rule on January 23, 1950, it was clear by this date to virtually all observers that "the days of the 30- and 60-minute player" were "apparently doomed." Consequently full offensive and defensive units were named by the UP for the first time — a 22-man roster.

Offensively, the UP followed the conventional lineup of the day, selecting two ends, two offensive tackles, two guards, a center, a quarterback, two halfbacks, and a fullback.

On the defensive side the UP selected two defensive ends, two defensive tackles, two middle guards, two linebackers, two defensive halfbacks, and one safety.

First- and second-team squads were named for each of these positions. No specialist players such as kickers, punters, or kick returners were named.

The rival Associated Press (AP), making its selections via a poll of "AP sportswriters in each city where the pros played," announced its elections early in January 1952. The 1951 season similarly marked the first time that both offensive and defensive teams were named by the AP. No "second team" was named, rather a more expansive "honorable mention" list was published.

The third, and least prestigious, of the major All-Pro teams was chosen by the staff of the New York Daily News.

== Selections ==
The All-Pro selections were dominated by players from the Cleveland Browns (nine first-team honorees including Otto Graham and Lou Groza), New York Giants (seven honorees including Emlen Tunnell), Los Angeles Rams (six first-team honorees including Elroy Hirsch), and Detroit Lions (four first-team honorees including Doak Walker).

Consensus first-team All-Pros (13) marked with bold type.

Offensive selections
Position	Player	Team	Selector(s)
Quarterback	Otto Graham	Cleveland Browns	AP-1, UP-1, NYDN-1
Quarterback	Bob Waterfield	Los Angeles Rams	UP-2, NYDN-2
Halfback	Doak Walker	Detroit Lions	AP, UP-1, NYDN-1
Halfback	Dub Jones	Cleveland Browns	AP, UP-1, NYDN-1
Halfback	Joe Geri	Pittsburgh Steelers	UP-2, NYDN-1
Fullback	Dan Towler	Los Angeles Rams	UP-1, NYDN-1
Fullback	Eddie Price	New York Giants	AP, UP-2
Fullback	John "Kayo" Dottley	Chicago Bears	UP-2
End	Elroy Hirsch	Los Angeles Rams	AP, UP-1, NYDN-1
End	Dante Lavelli	Cleveland Browns	UP-1, NYDN-1
End	Leon Hart	Detroit Lions	AP, UP-1 [def. end]
Tackle	George Connor	Chicago Bears	AP, UP-1 [def. tackle], NYDN-1
Tackle	Tex Coulter	New York Giants	UP-1, NYDN-1
Tackle	Lou Groza	Cleveland Browns	UP-1, NYDN-1
Tackle	Leo Nomellini	San Francisco 49ers	AP
Guard	Lou Creekmur	Detroit Lions	AP, UP-1, NYDN-1
Guard	Dick Barwegen	Chicago Bears	AP, UP-1, NYDN-1
Center	Frank Gatski	Cleveland Browns	UP-1, NYDN-1
Center	Vic Lindskog	Philadelphia Eagles	AP

Defensive selections
Position	Player	Team	Selector(s)
Defensive end	Len Ford	Cleveland Browns	AP, UP-1, NYDN-1
Defensive end	Larry Brink	Los Angeles Rams	AP
Defensive tackle	Arnie Weinmeister	New York Giants	AP, UP-1, NYDN-1
Defensive tackle	Al Derogatis	New York Giants	AP
Defensive guard	Bill Willis	Cleveland Browns	AP, UP-1, NYDN-1
Defensive guard	Les Bingaman	Detroit Lions	AP
Defensive guard	Jon Baker	New York Giants	UP-1
Defensive guard	Stan West	Los Angeles Rams	UP-2
Linebacker	Chuck Bednarik	Philadelphia Eagles	AP, UP-1, NYDN-1
Linebacker	Tony Adamle	Cleveland Browns	UP-1, NYDN-1
Linebacker	Paul "Tank" Younger	Los Angeles Rams	AP
Defensive halfback	Otto Schnellbacher	New York Giants	AP, UP-1, NYDN-1
Defensive halfback	Warren Lahr	Cleveland Browns	UP-1, NYDN-1
Defensive halfback	Jerry Shipkey	Pittsburgh Steelers	AP
Safety	Emlen Tunnell	New York Giants	AP, UP-1, NYDN-1

=== AP Honorable Mentions ===
Offense

- Ends - Francis Polsfoot (Cardinals); Bob Mann (Packers); Dante Lavelli (Browns); Bob Walston (Eagles).
- Tackles - Bill Fischer (Cardinals); Paul Lipscomb (Redskins); Lou Groza (Browns).
- Guards - Abe Gibron (Browns); Bruno Banducci (49ers); Casimir Witucki (Redskins).
- Center - Frank Gatski (Browns).
- Backs - Bob Waterfield (Rams); Bob Hoernschemeyer (Lions); Dan Towler (Rams); Rob Goode (Redskins); Joe Geri (Steelers); Joe Perry (49ers); John Dottley (Bears); Bob Celeri (Yanks).

Defense

- Defensive Ends - Ed Sprinkle (Bears); Ray Poole Giants.
- Defensive Tackles - John Kissell (Browns); Mike McCormack (Yanks).
- Middle Guards - Visco Grgich (49ers); Alex Agase (Browns).
- Linebackers - Tony Adamle (Browns); Tommy Thompson (Browns).
- Defensive Halfbacks - Howard Hartley (Steelers); Don Doll (Lions); Harry Gilmer (Redskins); Jack Christiansen (Lions).
- Safety - Buddy Young (Yanks).
