= Dick Daugherty =

American football player (1929–2009)

- Bruce Long and Dick Daugherty in 1959

No. 67, 50
- Positions: Guard, center, linebacker

Personal information
- Born: March 31, 1929; Moundsville, West Virginia, U.S.
- Died: March 10, 2009 (aged 79); Tucson, Arizona, U.S.
- Listed height: 6 ft 1 in (1.85 m)
- Listed weight: 219 lb (99 kg)

Career information
- College: Oregon
- NFL draft: 1951: 18th round, 217th overall pick

Career history
- Los Angeles Rams (1951–1953, 1956–1958)

Awards and highlights
- NFL champion (1951); Pro Bowl (1957)

Career NFL statistics
- Games played: 69
- Games started: 59
- Fumble recoveries: 6
- Total touchdowns: 2
- Stats at Pro Football Reference

Richard Lee Daugherty (March 31, 1929 – March 10, 2009) was an offensive lineman and linebacker who played six seasons in the National Football League (NFL) for the Los Angeles Rams.
