= Vitamin Smith =

American football player (1923–2000)

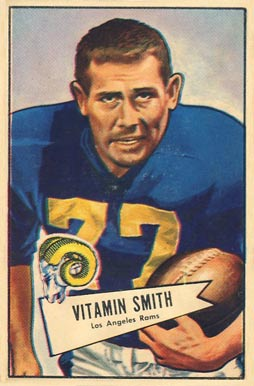
- Smith on a 1952 Bowman football card

No. 77, 47
- Position: Halfback

Personal information
- Born: October 30, 1923; Sweetwater, Texas, U.S.
- Died: February 14, 2000 (aged 76); Lake Dallas, Texas, U.S.
- Listed height: 5 ft 8 in (1.73 m)
- Listed weight: 179 lb (81 kg)

Career information
- High school: Sweetwater; Ventura (CA)
- College: Abilene Christian (1946–1948)
- NFL draft: 1949: undrafted

Career history
- Los Angeles Rams (1949–1953)

Awards and highlights
- NFL champion (1951); NFL kickoff return yards leader (1950)

Career NFL statistics
- Rushing yards: 669
- Receiving yards: 1,025
- Kick return yards: 1,453
- Punt return yards: 814
- Total touchdowns: 23
- Stats at Pro Football Reference

Verda T. "Vitamin" Smith Jr. (October 30, 1923 – February 14, 2000) was a National Football League (NFL) running back for the Los Angeles Rams from 1949 through 1953.

Smith served in the United States Army and participated in the Battle of Normandy before enrolling at Abilene Christian University where he sprinted, threw javelin and played college football for the Wildcats. In the NFL, Smith was a return specialist. In 1950, he set a record by returning three kicks for touchdowns in a single season. That record would stand until 1967.

Verda T. Smith married Myra Pearce, daughter of Mr. and Mr.s Herman F. Pearce, in Ventura, California on August 15, 1946. He was a student at Abilene Christian College at the time.

== NFL career statistics ==
Legend
	Won the NFL championship
**Bold**	Career high

=== Regular season ===
Year	Team	Games		Rushing					Receiving				
Year	Team	GP	GS	Att	Yds	Avg	Lng	TD	Rec	Yds	Avg	Lng	TD
1949	RAM	12	4	40	117	2.9	26	2	5	63	12.6	24	1
1950	RAM	12	4	51	**250**	**4.9**	25	1	**16**	**279**	17.4	**67**	**4**
1951	RAM	12	9	52	143	2.8	**31**	1	**16**	278	17.4	**67**	1
1952	RAM	12	10	**57**	133	2.3	20	**3**	**16**	254	15.9	56	3
1953	RAM	11	3	8	26	3.3	21	0	6	151	**25.2**	54	3
		59	30	208	669	3.2	31	7	59	1,025	17.4	67	12

=== Playoffs ===
Year	Team	Games		Rushing					Receiving				
Year	Team	GP	GS	Att	Yds	Avg	Lng	TD	Rec	Yds	Avg	Lng	TD
1949	RAM	1	1	6	11	1.8	-	0	2	11	5.5	-	0
1950	RAM	2	2	7	**23**	**3.3**	**15**	0	**4**	**81**	**20.3**	**38**	0
1951	RAM	1	0	**9**	15	1.7	8	0	1	18	18.0	18	0
1952	RAM	1	1	4	-8	-2.0	2	0	0	0	0.0	0	0
		5	4	26	41	1.6	15	0	7	110	15.7	38	0
