= Joe Reid (American football) =

American football player (1929–2020)

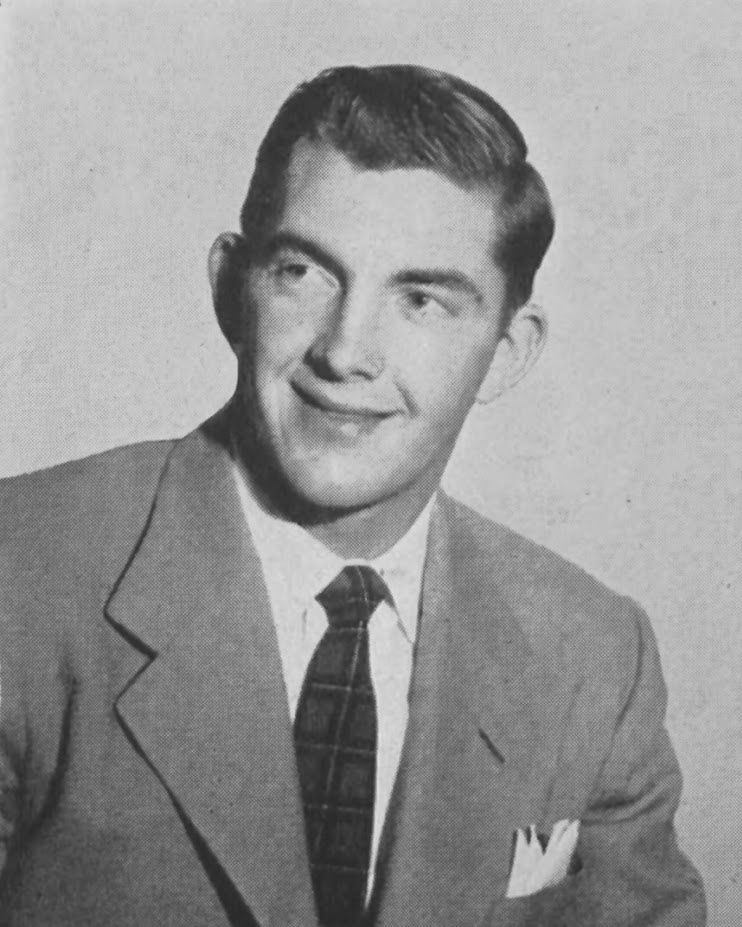

No. 52
- Positions: Linebacker, center

Personal information
- Born: March 18, 1929; Meridian, Mississippi, U.S.
- Died: March 5, 2020 (aged 90); Houston, Texas, U.S.
- Listed height: 6 ft 3 in (1.91 m)
- Listed weight: 225 lb (102 kg)

Career information
- High school: Meridian
- College: LSU (1947–1950)
- NFL draft: 1951: 13th round, 156th overall pick

Career history
- Los Angeles Rams (1951); Dallas Texans (1952)

Awards and highlights
- NFL champion (1951)

Career NFL statistics
- Interceptions: 1
- Fumble recoveries: 2
- Stats at Pro Football Reference

Joseph Edmondson Reid (March 18, 1929 – March 5, 2020) was an American professional football linebacker who played for the Los Angeles Rams and Dallas Texans. He played college football at Louisiana State University, having previously attended Meridian High School. He would later receive an MBA from Harvard Business School.

== Biography ==
In 1972, Reid joined the Superior Oil Company as a vice-president. He became a senior vice-president in 1974 and in 1978 was appointed president. In 1980 he succeeded Howard Keck as chief executive officer, and in 1981 relinquished the presidency to become chairman of the board. Additionally, he served as chairman of Falconbridge Nickel Mines and McIntyre Mines, two Canadian companies controlled by Superior. Reid resigned from Superior in September 1981 amid speculation that the board blamed him for the recent resignation of several key executives. After he was fired, the company reached an agreement that would see him paid $25,000 per month through June 1985, and then receive $100,000 per annum for life upon turning 60.
