= Dan Towler =

American football player (1928–2001)

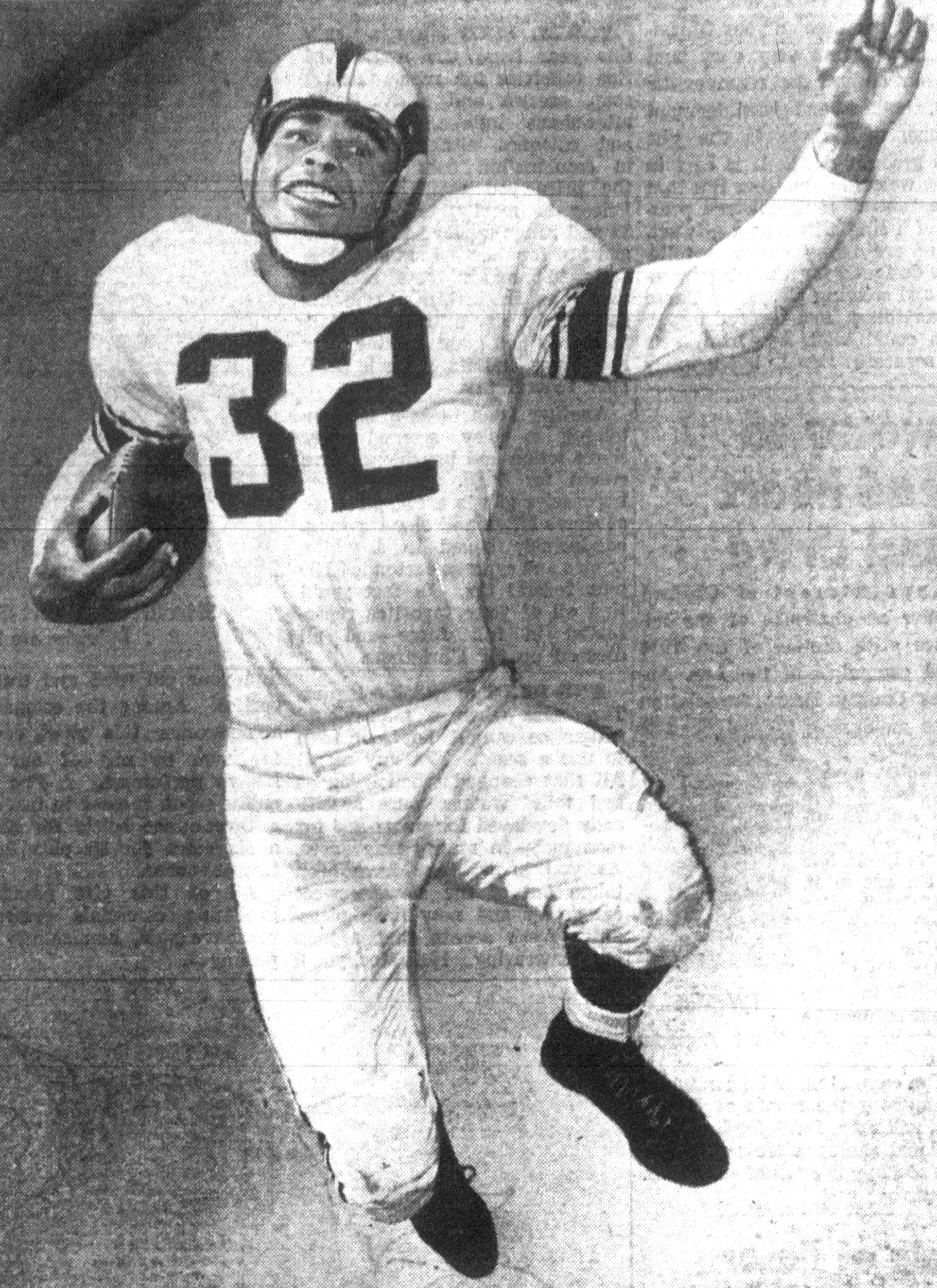
- Towler, circa 1953

No. 32
- Position: Halfback

Personal information
- Born: March 6, 1928; Donora, Pennsylvania, U.S.
- Died: August 1, 2001 (aged 73); Pasadena, California, U.S.
- Listed height: 6 ft 2 in (1.88 m)
- Listed weight: 225 lb (102 kg)

Career information
- College: Washington & Jefferson (1946–1949)
- NFL draft: 1950: 25th round, 324th overall pick

Career history
- Los Angeles Rams (1950–1955)

Awards and highlights
- NFL champion (1951); First-team All-Pro (1952); 3× Second-team All-Pro (1951, 1953, 1954); 4× Pro Bowl (1951–1954); NFL rushing yards leader (1952); 2× NFL rushing touchdowns leader (1952, 1954)

Career NFL statistics
- Rushing yards: 3,493
- Rushing average: 5.2
- Receptions: 62
- Receiving yards: 665
- Total touchdowns: 44
- Stats at Pro Football Reference

Daniel Lee "Deacon" Towler (March 6, 1928 – August 1, 2001) was an American professional football player. He played in the National Football League (NFL) as a fullback for the Los Angeles Rams from 1950 through 1955. Towler was selected to play in the Pro Bowl four consecutive seasons (being the most valuable player in the January 1952 game); was named a first- or second-team All-Pro in four seasons; and was on the 1951 Rams' NFL championship team. He led the NFL in rushing yards one season and rushing touchdowns in two seasons. He was in the top four in total rushing yards over four consecutive NFL seasons, and was second in yards per carry in three consecutive seasons. He once rushed for over 200 yards in a single game.

Towler attended Washington & Jefferson College where he was a cum laude graduate in theology. As a member of the school's football team he was third in the nation in scoring in 1948, and was an Associated Press second-team Little All-American that year. He is a member of the National Association of Intercollegiate Athletics (NAIA) Hall of Fame.

Towler's stated primary objective throughout his life was to serve in the ministry. During his playing career with the Rams, he and the team had an agreement under which the Rams gave Towler the leeway to study at the University of Southern California's school of religion, unhindered by having to meet certain otherwise mandatory team obligations. After six years, Towler obtained a Master's Degree in theology from USC. He also later obtained a doctorate in education from USC.

Towler retired from professional football after the 1955 season, and became the minister of a church in Pasadena for the following decade. After that, among other things, Towler served as a chaplain, and assistant to the president, at California State University, Los Angeles. He also was the six-term president of the Los Angeles County Board of Education, among numerous other positions he served in over the years in the religious, charitable, educational, academic, and public sectors.

== Early life ==
Towler was born on March 6, 1928, in Donora, Pennsylvania, to William (a minister) and Evelyn Towler. Towler's mother died in 1942. He was one of nine children. Towler was raised in a religious family, and began reading the Bible at seven-years old, which became a daily ritual after that in his life. It was also around this time that he first developed the intention to become a minister.

Towler attended Donora High School, graduating in 1946. He was known as "Deacon" Dan Towler in high school, as the other students knew he wanted to become a minister. As a high school student he had already become a public speaker.

Donora won Class AA high school championships in 1944 and 1945. As a senior in 1945, playing fullback, the reportedly 217 lb (98.4 kg) or 195 lb (88.5 kg) Fowler scored 24 touchdowns and had a conference record 152 total points. He was twice selected All-State in football.

The 1944 Donora team had a 9–0 record, and won the Western Pennsylvania Interscholastic Athletic League (WPIAL) title. They outscored their opponents 324–44 during that season. The 1945 team was likewise 9–0, won the WPIAL title, and outscored their opponents 279–13.

Towler was also a forward on the school's basketball team, an outfielder on its baseball team, and was a sprinter and threw the shot put on Donora's track and field team. The 1944 basketball team won the WPIAL championship and finished second in Pennsylvania.

== College Career ==
Towler attended Washington & Jefferson College (W&J) where he graduated cum laude. He was on the dean's list as a student. His decision to attend W&J was based upon it having theology courses that he could pursue in preparation for seminary studies, with the goal of becoming a minister.

Towler played on the school's football team as a running back from 1946 to 1949; and was also a kick returner and placekicker. Going into his senior season, he was said to be 6 ft 3 in (1.91 m) 240 lb (108.9 kg), and able to run the 100-yard dash in 9.8 seconds. He was part of the "Four Gazelles" backfield (Towler, Jack Sourbeer, Walt Cooper and Russ Hughes), that was considered at one time to have the fastest group of four running backs in college football in 1948, as each could run the 100-yard dash in 10.2 seconds or less.

As a freshman at W&J, Towler scored 60 points. He then scored 74 points in eight games as a sophomore, including a 95-yard kickoff return for a touchdown. In the first game of his junior season (1948), Towler scored five touchdowns, including an 85-yard return of the opening kickoff, and kicked four extra points. Overall in 1948, Towler had 20 touchdowns and 13 extra point conversions for 133 points in only eight games. He was reported at the time to have been the leading scorer in the East and third leading scorer in the nation; having been the leading scorer in all of college football until the final week of the 1948 college season. It has also been stated that he led the nation in scoring in 1948. His 16.6 points per game led the nation in scoring average per game.

Towler suffered a leg injury in the last game of the 1948 season. His leg problems continued throughout the 1949 season, and the team had a losing year. He attempted to play, but was hobbled and could not play more than 15 minutes in a game if he did appear in a game.

It has been stated that Towler was a two-time Little All-American. The Associated Press named him a second-team Little All-American in December 1948. He was twice selected All-Pennsylvania, in 1947 and 1948. It has also been reported he was a college All-State selection in 1946 as well. He continued to be known as "Deacon" during his college playing time, as he had been in high school.

Towler was interested in becoming a professional football player, but only if he could continue seminary studies in the off-season or even during the football season.

== Professional Career ==
The Los Angeles Rams selected Towler in the 25th round of the 1950 NFL draft, 324th overall. During his entire career (1950 to 1955), the NFL played 12-game seasons. As a rookie in 1950, he started one game at fullback. On the season, he had 130 yards rushing on 46 carries, with six rushing touchdowns. The Rams' starting fullback in the other 11 games was Dick Hoerner. Rams' linebacker Paul "Tank" Younger was also used as a fullback at times in 1950, with eight rushing attempts.

During a 1950 game on a muddy field, head coach Joe Stydahar got the idea to use the three fullbacks simultaneously in the backfield, which formation became known as the "Bull Elephant backfield"; each runner weighing at least 225 pounds (102 kg) (or at least 220 lb in Hoerner's case). The Rams defeated the Chicago Bears in a divisional playoff game that season, 24–14. Towler had two rushing attempts and one reception in that game. The Rams lost to the Cleveland Browns 30–28 in the 1950 NFL championship game. Towler did not record any offensive statistics in the game.

In 1951, Towler started five games as a fullback, but led the team with 126 carries, 854 yards and a 6.8 yards per carry average. His six rushing touchdowns tied for the team lead with Hoerner (a starter in 10 games), who had 569 yards on 94 carries. Younger's offensive role increased that season, with 223 yards on 36 carries. Each of the three "Bull Elephants" averaged over six yards per carry that season. Hoerner was traded to the Dallas Texans before the 1952 season, ending their two year association.

In the 1951 season, Towler was third in the NFL in total rushing yards, and second in yards per carry behind Tobin Rote's 6.9 yards per carry. The Rams defeated the Cleveland Browns in the 1951 NFL Championship Game, 24–17. In that game, Fowler rushed for 36 yards in 16 carries, with one touchdown. He was selected to play in the January 1952 NFL All-Star Game (now the Pro Bowl). United Press International (UPI) named him first-team All-Pro, and the Associated Press (AP) named him second-team All-Pro that season. He was the January 12, 1952 Pro Bowl’s most valuable player.

Fowler was the NFL's leading rusher in 1952 with 894 yards, and also led the NFL in rushing touchdowns, with 10. His 5.7 yards per carry was second in the NFL that season to Hugh McElhenny (7.0 yards per carry). He was again selected to play in the Pro Bowl, and both the AP and UPI named him first-team All-Pro. The Rams lost in the divisional round of the 1952 NFL playoffs to the Detroit Lions. Towler had 54 yards on 13 carries for one touchdown, and a 21-yard reception in that game. The Lions were the eventual NFL champions that year.

In 1953, Towler started nine games. He had 879 yards on 152 carries, with seven rushing touchdowns. He also had 11 receptions for 125 yards and one receiving touchdown. He was selected to play in the Pro Bowl for the third consecutive season, and he was a first-team UPI All-Pro. In 1953, the AP only selected one team of offensive and defensive All-Pros, and Towler was not named to that team. Towler was, however, one of five other offensive players who received an honorable mention for All-Pro from the AP for the 1953 season. His 5.8 yards per carry was second in the NFL. He was also second in rushing yards and tied for third in rushing touchdowns (just behind Tank Younger who had eight that season).

In a November 1953 game against the Baltimore Colts, Towler rushed for a career game-high 205 yards on only 14 carries; including a 73-yard touchdown run. Towler also had runs of 32, 31 and 25 yards in that game. He later said, "Our right halfback was hurt, so I was moved from fullback to right half, and wasn't familiar with it. I was taking tosses from the quarterback and going every which way but the right way. I ran the wrong way on practically every play and it was the best running game I ever had".

Towler started seven games in 1954. He had 599 yards on 149 carries. His career-high 11 rushing touchdowns led the NFL that season. He was fourth in the NFL in total rushing yards (11 behind Tank Younger who was third). His 4.0 yards per carry was his lowest average since his rookie season. He was selected to play in the Pro Bowl for a fourth straight season. Towler was named second-team All-Pro by the AP and Newspaper Enterprise Association.

In 1955, Towler only started three games. He missed nine starts because of a knee condition that persisted during the season. He finished the regular season with 137 yards on 43 carries, with three rushing touchdowns. For the third time in six years, the Rams played the Cleveland Browns for the NFL championship. With Tank Younger unable to play, Towler started at fullback for the Rams in that game, which Cleveland won. Towler had 64 yards in 14 rushing attempts, in his last professional football game.

Towler retired after six seasons to become a Methodist minister. During his six seasons with the Rams he started 36 games, appearing in 67. He had 3,493 yards in 672 rushing attempts, with 43 touchdowns and a 5.2 yards per carry average. He also had 662 receptions for 665 yards. At the time he retired, his 5.2 yards per carry was eighth highest in NFL history.

== Legacy and honors ==
The football statistics website Football Nation calls Towler "the greatest running back you don't know," and "a bright, shining star who lit up the NFL for an oh-so-brief but spectacular three-year period unlike any before or since." "[F]or a three-year period in the early 1950s," says Football Nation, "Towler was the closest thing the NFL has ever produced to an unstoppable ball carrier".

Towler was selected as a member of the National Association of Intercollegiate Athletics (NAIA) Hall of Fame in 1957. In 1999, Towler was inducted into Washington & Jefferson’s Athletics Hall of Fame. In 2000, he was inducted into the Pennsylvania Sports Hall of Fame. He was inducted into the Washington Greene Hall of Fame in 1999. He was a president of the NFL Alumni Los Angeles chapter. The Professional Football Researchers Association named Towler to the PFRA Hall of Very Good Class of 2006.

== Personal life ==
During college at W&J, while studying theology, Towler preached at church services. Towler attended the school of religion at the University of Southern California (USC) during the six years he played for the Rams, graduating with honors in earning a master's degree. He considered himself a full-time student and part-time football player. Towler had an agreement with Rams' owner Dan Reeves that his studies took priority over football, and if there was a conflict between school and team meetings, he would attend classes. As in high school and college he continued to be known as "Deacon" during his playing career with the Rams. He preached in churches once a month during his playing career. Beginning in his rookie season, Towler led the Rams in a team prayer before each game, a rare practice at that time. He was one of the original directors of the Fellowship of Christian Athletes, and was a life member of its National Board of Trustees.

After retiring from football, Towler was named pastor of the Lincoln Avenue Methodist Church in Pasadena, California, where he served for a decade. He went from making $14,000 or $16,000 for his final season to making $3,600 as a pastor. He later earned a doctorate in education in 1969 at USC or 1972, while also expressing no regret for quitting football when he did.

After serving at the Lincoln Avenue Church, he became a director of the Wesley Foundation and served as a chaplain at California State University, Los Angeles (Cal State). He was a special assistant to the president of Cal State for 19 years. While working at Cal State in the University Development Office, Towler began a program establishing support groups for the university and organized the Black Support Group and the Asian Support Group. Towler also developed the Support Group Council. He also was involved in a range of efforts to establish funding for athletic programs at Cal State. Towler founded the Dan Towler Education Foundation, raising funds to provide financial assistance for gifted, needy, and minority college students who were studying medicine, nursing, religion and education.

Towler became a member of the Claremont School of Theology's (Claremont) Board of Trustees in 1975. He served as a director of the National School Boards Association and the California School Boards Association. He was the six-term president of the Los Angeles County Board of Education. After retiring from football, he became a voluntary statistician for the Associated Press, covering USC and Los Angeles Rams games (until that team moved to St. Louis in 1995). In 1987, he was appointed by the California State Senate to its Child Abuse Task Force. He also did ministry work behind the Iron Curtain.

Among other honors and awards outside of football, from academic institutions Towler received an honorary Doctor of Humane Letters from Washington & Jefferson; the Distinguished Alumnus Award from Claremont; the Outstanding Alumnus Award from USC; and Cal State's Distinguished Achievement Award. For his public service, Towler received awards from the Los Angeles County Board of Supervisors, the cities of Pasadena and Los Angeles, the California Coalition of Black School Board Members, and the California Youth Homes.

== Death ==
Towler died in his sleep on August 1, 2001 at the age of 73 in his Pasadena home. He was survived by his wife Rosalind (who he married in 1952) and his daughter Roslyn.

== NFL career statistics ==
Legend
	Won the NFL championship
	Led the league
**Bold**	Career high

=== Regular season ===
Year	Team	Games		Rushing					Receiving				
Year	Team	GP	GS	Att	Yds	Avg	Lng	TD	Rec	Yds	Avg	Lng	TD
1950	RAM	12	1	46	130	2.8	34	6	8	63	7.9	17	0
1951	RAM	12	5	126	854	**6.8**	**79**	6	**16**	**257**	**16.1**	46	0
1952	RAM	12	11	**156**	**894**	5.7	44	10	11	68	6.2	13	0
1953	RAM	12	9	152	879	5.8	73	7	11	125	11.4	**49**	**1**
1954	RAM	12	7	149	599	4.0	24	**11**	10	127	12.7	36	0
1955	RAM	7	3	43	137	3.2	14	3	6	25	4.2	11	0
Career		67	36	672	3,493	5.2	79	43	62	665	10.7	49	1

=== Playoffs ===
Year	Team	Games		Rushing					Receiving				
Year	Team	GP	GS	Att	Yds	Avg	Lng	TD	Rec	Yds	Avg	Lng	TD
1950	RAM	2	0	2	2	1.0	2	0	**1**	7	7.0	7	0
1951	RAM	1	1	**16**	36	2.3	9	**1**	0	0	0.0	0	0
1952	RAM	1	1	13	54	4.2	**17**	**1**	**1**	**21**	**21.0**	**21**	0
1955	RAM	1	1	14	**64**	**4.6**	15	0	**1**	7	7.0	7	0
Career		5	3	45	156	3.5	17	2	3	35	11.7	21	0
