= Jack Finlay (American football) =

American football player (1921–2014)

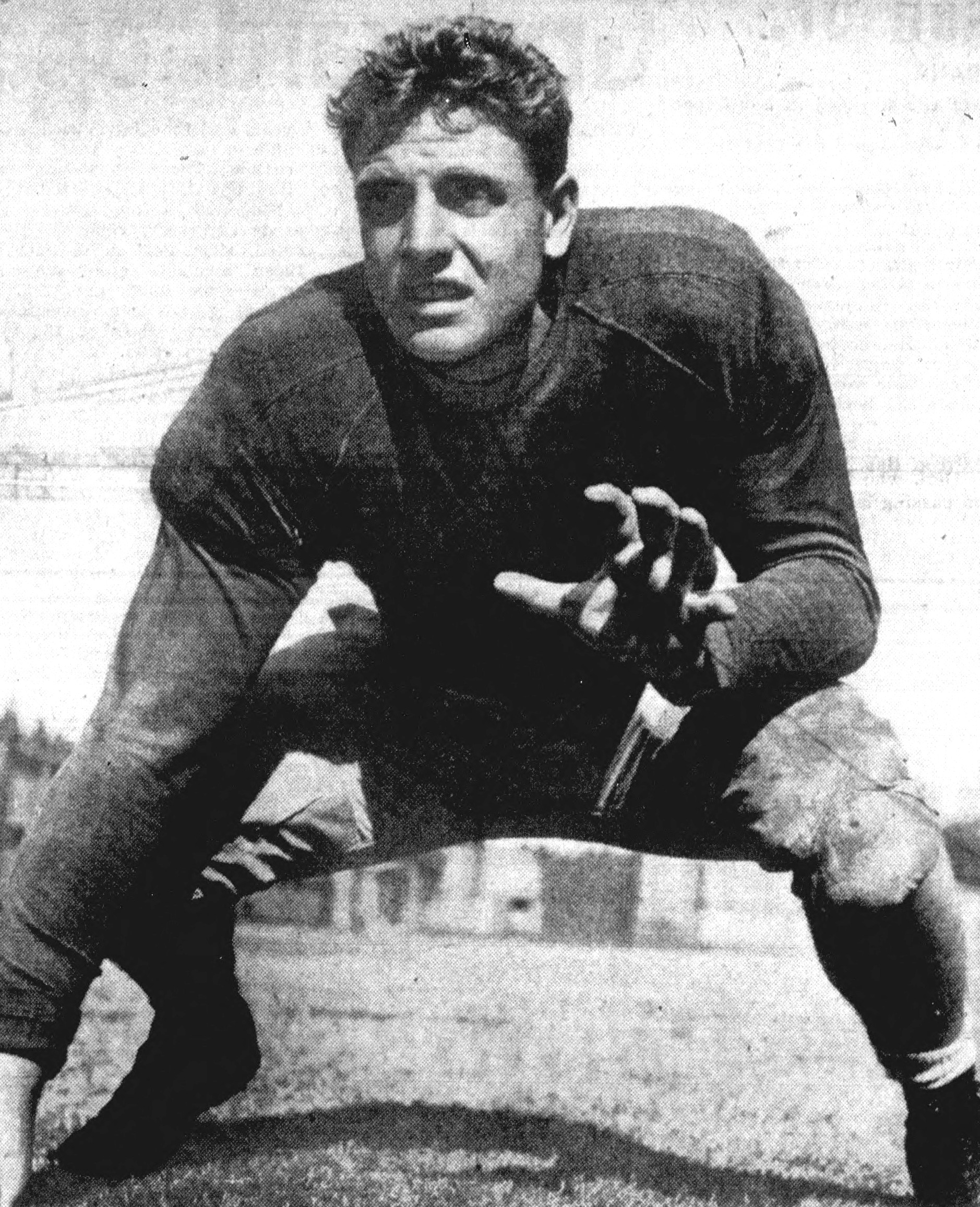
- Finlay in 1950

No. 68
- Position: Guard

Personal information
- Born: September 8, 1921; Los Angeles, California, U.S.
- Died: March 6, 2014 (aged 92); Rancho Mirage, California, U.S.

Career information
- College: UCLA

Career history
- Los Angeles Rams (1947–1951)

Awards and highlights
- NFL champion (1951)

Career statistics
- Games played: 55
- Games started: 2
- Fumble recoveries: 3

Jack Alexander Finlay (September 8, 1921 – March 6, 2014) was an American professional football player who was a guard for five seasons for the Los Angeles Rams. He was born in Los Angeles.
