= 1951 Los Angeles Rams season =

NFL team season

- Owner: Dan Reeves; Edwin W. Pauley
- General manager: Chile Walsh
- Head coach: Joe Stydahar
- Home stadium: Los Angeles Memorial Coliseum

Results
- Record: 8–4
- Division place: 1st NFL National
- Playoffs: Won NFL Championship (vs. Browns) 24–17
- Pro Bowlers: 8: Larry Brink, DE; Elroy Hirsch, WR; Don Paul, LB; Dan Towler, RB; Norm Van Brocklin, QB; Bob Waterfield, QB/K/P; Stan West, MG; Tank Younger, FB/LB

Uniform
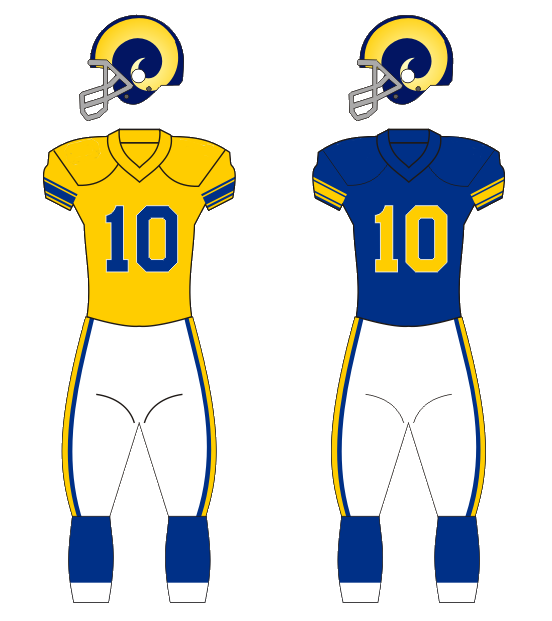

The 1951 Los Angeles Rams season was the team's 14th year in the National Football League and the sixth season in Los Angeles. In 1951, the Rams had an up-and-down season, never winning more than three games in a row, but were able to win eight games and clinch the National Conference after defeating the Green Bay Packers during Week 12 of the season. Los Angeles also led the National Football League in attendance for the second time while in Southern California; the first of 10 consecutive seasons leading the league in attendance. The Rams' largest crowd during the 1951 campaign was 67,186 against the Cleveland Browns during Week 2.

After their 8–4 campaign, Los Angeles won the National Conference and advanced to their third NFL Championship Game in a row and faced the powerhouse Cleveland Browns. The Rams ended up winning their second NFL Championship in seven seasons, and their first in Los Angeles. The 1951 NFL Championship was also the State of California's first major professional championship and was the Rams' only title while in Southern California, until Super Bowl LVI, 70 years later. The Rams would advance to the championship round four more times (1955, Super Bowl XIV, Super Bowl LIII, and Super Bowl LVI).

The Rams scored 391 points, the second-most of any NFL team in the 1950s (although significantly less than the highest-scoring team of the decade, the 1950 Rams). Los Angeles led the league in total points, total yards, passing yards, and was third in the league in rushing. Ram quarterbacks Bob Waterfield and Norm Van Brocklin led the National Football League in quarterback rating, with both in the top three in yards per completion. Elroy "Crazy Legs" Hirsch led in nearly every receiving category (receptions, receiving yards, receiving touchdowns, yards per reception, yards per game, and points scored). While the Rams' offensive statistics were stellar, Los Angeles' defense was middle-of-the pack in the NFL with 261 points and 3,879 yards given up.

== Offseason ==
=== NFL draft ===
1951 Los Angeles Rams Draft
Round	Selection	Player	Position	College	Notes
1	11	Bud McFadin	G	Texas	
2	36	Herb Rich	B	Vanderbilt	
3	35	Charlie Toogood	T	Nebraska	
4	48	George Kinek	B	Tulane	
5	59	Tony Momsen	C	Michigan	
6	72	Norb Hecker	E	Baldwin–Wallace	
7	83	Alan Egler	B	Colgate	
8	96	Hugo Primiani	T	Boston University	
9	107	Nolan Lang	B	Oklahoma	
10	121	Roland Kirkby	B	Washington	
11	132	John Natyshak	B	Tampa	
12	145	Don Hardey	B	Pacific	
13	156	Joe Reid	C	Louisiana State	
14	169	Rob McCoy	B	Georgia Tech	
15	180	Obie Posey	B	Southern	
16	193	Bill Robertson	E	Memphis State	
17	204	Hal Riley	E	Baylor	
18	217	Dick Daugherty	G	Oregon	
19	228	Andy Robustelli	DE	Arnold	
20	241	Jim Nutter	B	Wichita State	
21	252	Earl Stelle	B	Oregon	
22	265	Billy Baggett	B	Louisiana State	
23	276	Dean Thomas	T	Michigan State	
24	289	Harry Abeltin	T	Colgate	
25	300	Jackie Calvert	T	Clemson	
26	313	Howie Ruetz	T	Loras	
27	324	Al Brosky	B	Illinois	
28	337	Sterling Wingo	B	Virginia Tech	
29	348	Earl Jackson	B	Texas Tech	
30	361	Alvin Hanley	B	Kentucky State	

== Preseason ==
=== Schedule ===
Week	Opponent	Result	Record	Venue
1	vs. 11th Naval	W 55–2	1–0	Balboa Stadium
2	Washington Redskins	W 58–14	2–0	Los Angeles Memorial Coliseum
3	Chicago Bears	W 42–14	3–0	Los Angeles Memorial Coliseum
4	vs. Philadelphia Eagles	W 31–26	4–0	War Memorial Stadium
5	vs. Chicago Cardinals	L 36–21	4–1	Ute Stadium
6	at Cleveland Browns	L 6–7	4–2	Cleveland Stadium
7	at New York Giants	W 23–21	5–2	Polo Grounds

== Regular season ==
=== Schedule ===
Week	Date	Opponent	Result	Record	Venue	Recap
1	September 28	at **New York Yanks**	**W** 52–14	1–0	Los Angeles Memorial Coliseum	Recap
2	October 7	Cleveland Browns	**L** 23–38	1–1	Los Angeles Memorial Coliseum	Recap
3	October 14	at **Detroit Lions**	**W** 27–21	2–1	Briggs Stadium	Recap
4	October 21	at **Green Bay Packers**	**W** 28–0	3–1	State Fair Park	Recap
5	October 28	at **San Francisco 49ers**	**L** 17–44	3–2	Kezar Stadium	Recap
6	November 4	**San Francisco 49ers**	**W** 23–16	4–2	Los Angeles Memorial Coliseum	Recap
7	November 11	Chicago Cardinals	**W** 45–21	5–2	Los Angeles Memorial Coliseum	Recap
8	November 18	**New York Yanks**	**W** 48–21	6–2	Los Angeles Memorial Coliseum	Recap
9	November 25	at Washington Redskins	**L** 21–31	6–3	Griffith Stadium	Recap
10	December 2	at **Chicago Bears**	**W** 42–17	7–3	Wrigley Field	Recap
11	December 9	**Detroit Lions**	**L** 22–24	7–4	Los Angeles Memorial Coliseum	Recap
12	December 16	**Green Bay Packers**	**W** 42–14	8–4	Los Angeles Memorial Coliseum	Recap
Note: Intra-conference opponents are in **bold** text.

=== Week 1 ===
Week one of the 1951 season for the Los Angeles Rams was an exercise in complete domination over the hapless New York Yanks at the Los Angeles Coliseum. Los Angeles jumped out to a 34–0 lead before allowing a New York touchdown in the second quarter and would have likely held the Yanks to only 7 points if it were not for a 30-yard fumble return in the fourth quarter. Ram quarterback Norm Van Brocklin sliced up the New York defense, throwing for 554 yards with five touchdown passes and three different Los Angeles receivers also had over 100 yards receiving. This was the first of two home for the Rams against the now-defunct Yanks, who had to play eight of their 12 games on the road.

Week One: New York Yanks (0–0) at Los Angeles Rams (0–0)

Quarter	1	2	3	4	Total
Yanks	0	7	0	7	**14**
**Rams**	21	13	7	13	**54**

at Los Angeles Memorial Coliseum, Los Angeles, California

- Date: Friday, September 28
- Game attendance: 30,315 (29.82% full)
- Pro-Football-Reference.com

Game information

First Quarter

- LA – Elroy Hirsch 41-yard pass from Norm Van Brocklin (Tom Fears kick) – **Rams 7–0**
- LA – Dick Hoerner 22-yard rush (Tom Fears kick) – **Rams 14–0**
- LA – Vitamin Smith 67-yard pass from Norm Van Brocklin (Tom Fears kick) – **Rams 21–0**

Second Quarter

- LA – Norm Van Brocklin 1 yard rush (Tom Fears kick) – **Rams 28–0**
- LA – Elroy Hirsch 47-yard pass from Norm Van Brocklin (PAT failed) – **Rams 34–0**
- NYY – Buddy Young 79-yard punt return (Harvey Johnson kick) – **Rams 34–7**

Third Quarter

- LA – Elroy Hirsch 26-yard pass from Norm Van Brocklin (Tom Fears kick) – **Rams 41–7**

Fourth Quarter

- NYY – Art Tait 30-yard fumble return (Harvey Johnson kick) – **Rams 41–14**
- LA – Elroy Hirsch 1 yard pass from Norm Van Brocklin (Tom Fears kick) – **Rams 48–14**
- LA – Dan Towler 1 yard rush (PAT failed) – **Rams 54–14**

Rams

- **Norm Van Brocklin**— 27/41, 554 Yds, 5 TD, 2 INT
- **Elroy Hirsch**— 9 Rec, 173 Yds

=== Week 2 ===
Week two saw the Rams face the then-powerhouse Cleveland Browns, winners of five straight league championships (4 AAFC, 1 NFL), in front of 67,186 at the Los Angeles Coliseum. The game started well enough for Los Angeles, jumping out to a 10–0 lead and holding a 10–7 lead at halftime. The Browns, however, stormed out of the gate in the third quarter with 21 points to essentially salt away the eventual National Conference champion Rams. Los Angeles would eventually get a rematch with the eventual American Conference champion Browns in the NFL Championship Game and were able to defeat the powerhouse Browns the second time around.

Week Two: Cleveland Browns (0–1) at Los Angeles Rams (1–0)

Quarter	1	2	3	4	Total
**Browns**	7	0	21	10	**38**
Rams	10	0	7	6	**23**

at Los Angeles Memorial Coliseum, Los Angeles, California

- Date: Sunday, October 7
- Game attendance: 67,186 (66.08% full)
- Pro-Football-Reference.com

Game information

First Quarter

- LA – Elroy Hirsch 34-yard pass from Norm Van Brocklin (Bob Waterfield kick) – **Rams 7–0**
- LA – Bob Waterfield 47-yard field goal – **Rams 10–0**
- CLE – Ken Carpenter 45-yard pass from Otto Graham (Lou Groza kick) – **Rams 10–7**

Third Quarter

- CLE – Ken Carpenter 2-yard rush Lou Groza kick) – **Browns 14–10**
- CLE – Ken Carpenter 7-yard rush (Lou Groza kick) – **Browns 21–10**
- CLE – Warren Lahr 23-yard interception return (Lou Groza kick) – **Browns 28–10**
- LA – Glenn Davis 1 yard rush (Bob Waterfield kick) – **Browns 28–17**

Fourth Quarter

- CLE – Lou Groza 44-yard field goal – **Browns 31–17**
- LA – Glenn Davis 14-yard pass from Norm Van Brocklin (PAT failed) – **Browns 31–23**
- CLE – Dub Jones 1 yard rush (Lou Groza kick) – **Browns 38–23**

Browns

- **Dub Jones** – 9 Rush, 110 Yds

=== Week 3 ===
Week Two: Los Angeles Rams (1–1) at Detroit Lions (2–0)

Quarter	1	2	3	4	Total
**Rams**	7	0	21	10	**38**
Lions	10	0	7	6	**23**

at Briggs Stadium, Detroit

- Date: Sunday, October 14
- Game attendance: 52,907 (90.89% full)
- Pro-Football-Reference.com

Game information

First Quarter

- LA – Bob Waterfield 37-yard field goal – **Rams 3–0**
- LA – Elroy Hirsch 70-yard pass from Bob Waterfield (Bob Waterfield kick) – **Rams 10–0**

Second Quarter

- LA – Tom Fears 43-yard pass from Norm Van Brocklin (Bob Waterfield kick) – **Rams 17–0**
- DET – Dorne Dibble 36-yard pass from Bobby Layne (Doak Walker kick) – **Rams 17–7**
- DET – Jack Christiansen 69-yard punt return (Doak Walker kick) – **Rams 17–14**

Third Quarter

- LA – Norb Hecker 20-yard pass from Bob Waterfield (Bob Waterfield kick) – **Rams 24–14**
- LA – Bob Waterfield 47-yard field goal – **Rams 27–14**

Fourth Quarter

- DET – Jack Christiansen 47-yard punt return (Doak Walker kick) – **Rams 27–21**

Rams

- **Elroy Hirsch** – 7 Rec, 147 Yds

=== Week 4 ===
Week Four: Los Angeles Rams (2–1) at Green Bay Packers (2–1)

Quarter	1	2	3	4	Total
**Rams**	0	0	7	21	**28**
Packers	0	0	0	0	**0**

at State Fair Park, West Allis, Wisconsin

- Date: Sunday, October 21
- Game attendance: 21,393 (47.54% full)
- Pro-Football-Reference.com

Game information

Third Quarter

- LA – Dan Towler 79-yard rush (Bob Waterfield kick) – **Rams 7–0**

Fourth Quarter

- LA – Tommy Kalmanir 38-yard pass from Bob Waterfield (Bob Waterfield kick) – **Rams 14–0**
- LA – Elroy Hirsch 81-yard pass from Norm Van Brocklin (Bob Waterfield kick) – **Rams 21–0**
- LA – Jerry Williams 5-yard rush (Bob Waterfield kick) – **Rams 28–0**

Rams

- **Dan Towler** – 11 Rush, 144 Yds
- **Elroy Hirsch** – 3 Rec, 111 Yds

=== Week 5 ===
With Los Angeles heading into their rivalry game with the San Francisco 49ers on a two-game winning streak and a 3–1 record, the Rams were confident heading into Kezar Stadium in San Francisco. The Rams, however, were shocked by the rival 49ers 44–17. San Francisco exploded for four touchdowns (28 points) in the second quarter, effectively ending the game right there. The lone bright spot in the game for the Rams was the continued excellent play by Elroy "Crazy Legs" Hirsch with seven receptions, 163 yards, and one touchdown.

Week Five: Los Angeles Rams (3–1) at San Francisco 49ers (2–2)

Quarter	1	2	3	4	Total
Rams	3	7	7	0	**17**
**49ers**	10	28	0	6	**44**

at Kezar Stadium, San Francisco, California

- Date: Sunday, October 28
- Game attendance: 51,987 (86.73% full)
- Pro-Football-Reference.com

Game information

First Quarter

- SF – Gordy Soltau 23-yard field goal – **49ers 3–0**
- LA – Bob Waterfield 26-yard field goal – **Tied 3–3**
- SF – Joe Arenas 2-yard rush (Gordy Soltau kick) – **49ers 10–3**

Second Quarter

- SF – Gordy Soltau 10-yard pass from Frankie Albert (Gordy Soltau kick) – **49ers 17–3**
- LA – Elroy Hirsch 79-yard pass from Norm Van Brocklin (Bob Waterfield kick) – **49ers 17–10**
- SF – Johnny Strzykalski 1 yard rush (Gordy Soltau kick) – **49ers 24–10**
- SF – Leo Nomellini 20-yard blocked punt return (Gordy Soltau kick) – **49ers 31–10**
- SF – Gordy Soltau 13-yard pass from Y. A. Tittle (Gordy Soltau kick) – **49ers 38–10**

Third Quarter

- LA – Dick Hoerner 12-yard rush (Bob Waterfield kick) – **49ers 38–17**

Fourth Quarter

- SF – Gordy Soltau 48-yard pass from Y. A. Tittle (PAT failed) – **49ers 44–17**

Rams

- **Elroy Hirsch** – 7 Rec, 163 Yds

49ers

- **Gordy Soltau** – 6 Rec, 132 Yds

=== Week 6 ===
After being embarrassed on the road in San Francisco, the Rams returned home to the Los Angeles Memorial Coliseum to face the very same 49ers that defeated them a week earlier. This meeting, however, ended with a Los Angeles victory. The Rams had a 13–7 lead heading into halftime, but the third quarter saw San Francisco tie the game at 13 (after a missed PAT) and then early in the fourth quarter take the lead. Los Angeles responded after the 49ers took the lead and rattled off 10 points in the fourth quarter to salt the game away.

Week Six: San Francisco 49ers (3–2) at Los Angeles Rams (3–2)

Quarter	1	2	3	4	Total
49ers	0	7	6	3	**16**
**Rams**	10	3	0	10	**23**

at Los Angeles Memorial Coliseum, Los Angeles, California

- Date: Sunday, November 4
- Game attendance: 55,569 (54.66% full)
- Pro-Football-Reference.com

Game information

First Quarter

- LA – Bob Waterfield 39-yard field goal – **Rams 3–0**
- LA – Bob Waterfield 1 yard rush (Bob Waterfield kick) – **Rams 10–0**

Second Quarter

- SF – Joe Perry 58-yard rush (Gordy Soltau kick) – **Rams 10–7**
- LA – Bob Waterfield 20-yard field goal – **Rams 13–7**

Third Quarter

- SF – Frankie Albert 7-yard rush (PAT failed) – **Tied 13–13**

Fourth Quarter

- SF – Gordy Soltau 11-yard field goal – **49ers 16–13**
- LA – Elroy Hirsch 76-yard pass from Bob Waterfield (Bob Waterfield kick) – **Rams 20–16**
- LA – Bob Waterfield 38-yard field goal – **Rams 23–16**

49ers

- **Joe Perry** – 12 Rush, 115 Yds

Rams

- **Elroy Hirsch** – 4 Rec, 103 Yds

=== Week 7 ===
Week Six: Chicago Cardinals (1–5) at Los Angeles Rams (4–2)

Quarter	1	2	3	4	Total
Cardinals	7	0	0	14	**21**
**Rams**	0	7	28	10	**45**

at Los Angeles Memorial Coliseum, Los Angeles, California

- Date: Sunday, November 11
- Game attendance: 29,995 (29.50% full)
- Pro-Football-Reference.com

Game information

First Quarter

- CHC – Billy Cross 80-yard pass from Jim Hardy (Cliff Patton kick) – **Cardinals 7–0**

Second Quarter

- LA – Dick Hoerner 11-yard rush (Bob Waterfield kick) – **Tied 7–7**

Third Quarter

- LA – Bob Waterfield 1 yard rush (Bob Waterfield kick) – **Rams 14–7**
- LA – Tommy Kalmanir 67-yard punt return (Bob Waterfield kick) – **Rams 21–7**
- LA – Dick Hoerner 3-yard rush (Bob Waterfield kick) – **Rams 28–7**
- LA – Elroy Hirsch 53-yard pass from Bob Waterfield (Bob Waterfield kick) – **Rams 35–7**

Fourth Quarter

- CHC – Charley Trippi 3-yard rush (Cliff Patton kick) – **Rams 35–14**
- LA – Elroy Hirsch 54-yard pass from Norm Van Brocklin (Bob Waterfield kick) – **Rams 42–14**
- LA – Bob Waterfield 26-yard field goal – **Rams 45–14**
- CHC – Fran Polsfoot 80-yard pass from Charley Trippi (Cliff Patton kick) – **Rams 45–21**

Rams

- **Dan Towler** – 11 Rush, 109 Yds
- **Elroy Hirsch** – 6 Rec, 195 Yds

== Standings ==
NFL National Conference
	W	L	T	PCT	CONF	PF	PA	STK
Los Angeles Rams	8	4	0	.667	7–2	392	261	W1
San Francisco 49ers	7	4	1	.636	5–2–1	255	205	W3
Detroit Lions	7	4	1	.636	5–4–1	336	259	L1
Chicago Bears	7	5	0	.583	6–2	286	282	L1
Green Bay Packers	3	9	0	.250	1–8	254	375	L7
New York Yanks	1	9	2	.100	1–7–2	241	382	L2

Note: Tie games were not officially counted in the standings until 1972.

== Postseason ==
Week	Date	Opponent	Result	Record	Venue	Recap
NFL Championship	December 23	Cleveland Browns	W 24–17	1–0	Los Angeles Memorial Coliseum	Recap

=== NFL Championship Game ===
The Rams were the first to score with a 1-yard run by fullback Dick Hoerner in the second quarter. The Browns answered back with an NFL Championship record 52-yard field goal by Lou Groza. They later took the lead with a 17-yard touchdown pass from Otto Graham to Dub Jones. The Browns led at halftime 10–7.

In the third quarter Larry Brink landed a hard tackle on Graham causing him to fumble the ball. Andy Robustelli picked up the ball on the Cleveland 24 and returned it to the Cleveland 2. On the third play of the drive, "Deacon" Dan Towler ran the ball in for a touchdown from the one-yard line giving the Rams a 14–10 lead.

Early in the fourth quarter, the Rams increased their lead with a Bob Waterfield 17-yard field goal. The Browns answered back with an 8-play, 70-yard drive that ended with a 5-yard touchdown run by Ken Carpenter, tying the game at 17–17. Twenty-five seconds later, late in the fourth quarter, Tom Fears beat defenders Cliff Lewis and Tommy James and received a Norm Van Brocklin pass at midfield. Fears raced to the endzone for a 73-yard touchdown, securing a Rams 24–17 win and the 1951 NFL title.

NFL Championship Game: Cleveland Browns (11–1) at Los Angeles Rams (8–4)

Quarter	1	2	3	4	Total
Browns	0	10	0	7	17
Rams	0	7	7	10	24

at Los Angeles Memorial Coliseum, Los Angeles, California

- Date: Sunday, December 23
- Game attendance: 59,475 (58.50% full)
- TV announcers (DuMont): Harry Wismer and Earl Gillespie
- Pro-Football-Reference.com
  '51 Rams Celebrate Their Title Season (LA Times)

Game information

Second Quarter

- LA – Dick Hoerner 1-yard run (Bob Waterfield kick) – Rams 0–7
- CLE – Lou Groza 52-yard field goal – Rams 3–7
- CLE – Dub Jones 17-yard pass from Otto Graham (Lou Groza kick) – Browns 10–7

Third Quarter

- LA – Dan Towler 1-yard run (Bob Waterfield kick) – Rams 10–14

Fourth Quarter

- LA – Bob Waterfield 17-yard field goal – Rams 10–17
- CLE – Ken Carpenter 5-yard run (Lou Groza kick) – Tied 17–17
- LA – Tom Fears 73-yard pass from Norm Van Brocklin (Bob Waterfield kick) – Rams 17–24

Browns

- Otto Graham— 19/40, 280 Yds, 1 TD, 3 INT
- Otto Graham— 5 Rush, 43 Yds
- Mac Speedie— 7 Rec, 81 Yds

Rams

- Norm Van Brocklin— 4/6, 128 Yds, 1 TD, 0 INT
- Dan Towler— 16 Rush, 36 Yds
- Tom Fears— 4 Rec, 146 Yds

== Coaching staff ==
1951 Los Angeles Rams staff
Front office: Owner/CEO – Dan Reaves; COO/executive vice president of football operations – Edwin W. Pauley; General manager – Chile Walsh; Head coaches: Head coach – Joe Stydahar; Offensive coaches: Wide receivers – Red Hickey	Defensive coaches: Defensive backs/pass game coordinator – Hampton Pool; Outside linebackers – Ray Richards

== Final roster ==
1951 Los Angeles Rams roster
Quarterbacks (QB): 11 Norm Van Brocklin P; 7 Bob Waterfield K; Running backs (RB): 41 Glenn Davis; 31 Dick Hoerner; 24 Tommy Kalmanir; 77 Vitamin Smith; 32 Dan Towler; Wide receivers (WR): 55 Tom Fears; 40 Elroy Hirsch; 10 Tom Keane CB; Tight ends (TE)	Offensive linemen (OL): 72 Bobby Collier T/DE; 71 Tom Dahms T; 67 Dick Daugherty G; 26 Bill Lange G; 50 Leon McLaughlin C; 76 Don Simensen T; 70 Charlie Toogood T/DT; Defensive linemen (DL): 63 Larry Brink DE; 58 Jack Finlay DT/G; 93 Jack Halliday DT; 81 Andy Robustelli DE; 44 Harry Thompson DT/G; 64 Stan West MG; 78 Jim Winkler DT	Linebackers (LB): 57 Don Paul; 52 Joe Reid; 13 Tank Younger RB; Defensive backs (DB): 80 Bob Boyd S/CB/WR; 88 Norb Hecker S/WR; 27 Marvin Johnson CB/RB; 30 Woodley Lewis CB; 42 Herb Rich S; 33 Jerry Williams CB/RB; Special teams (ST)	Reserve: -- Paul Barry RB (Military); -- Dick McKissack LB (DNR); -- George Sims CB (Military); 56 Jack Zilly DE (IR); Rookies in italics 33 active, 4 reserve
