= 1952 Pro Bowl =

National Football League all-star game

1952 National–American Pro Bowl
American Conference	National Conference
13	30
Head coach: Paul Brown (Cleveland Browns)	Head coach: Joe Stydahar (Los Angeles Rams)
	1	2	3	4	Total
American Conference	7	6	0	0	13
National Conference	3	7	0	20	30
- Date: January 12, 1952
- Stadium: Memorial Coliseum; Los Angeles, California
- MVP: Dan Towler (Los Angeles Rams)
- Attendance: 19,400

TV in the United States
- Network: NBC
- Announcers: Harry Wismer, Bill Stern

The 1952 Pro Bowl was the NFL's second annual all-star game which featured the league's outstanding performers from the 1951 season. The game was played on January 12, 1952, at the Los Angeles Memorial Coliseum in Los Angeles, California in front of 19,400 fans. The National Conference squad defeated the American Conference by a score of 30–13.

The National team was led by the Los Angeles Rams' Joe Stydahar while Paul Brown of the Cleveland Browns coached the American stars. Los Angeles Rams running back Dan Towler was named the game's outstanding player.

Each player on the victorious National roster received $600, while the losing American players took away $500 each.
