= 1951 NFL Championship Game =

Coordinates: 34.014°N 118.287°W

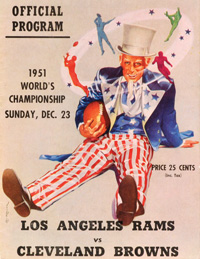
Cleveland Browns (American) (11–1)	Los Angeles Rams (National) (8–4)
17	24
Head coach: Paul Brown	Head coach: Joe Stydahar
	1	2	3	4	Total
CLE	0	10	0	7	17
LA	0	7	7	10	24
- Date: December 23, 1951
- Stadium: Los Angeles Memorial Coliseum; Los Angeles, California
- Attendance: 59,475

TV in the United States
- Network: DuMont
- Announcers: Harry Wismer & Earl Gillespie

Location in the United States

The 1951 NFL Championship Game was the National Football League's 19th championship game, played December 23 at the Los Angeles Memorial Coliseum in Los Angeles, California.

It was a rematch of the previous year's game in Cleveland, with the Los Angeles Rams (8–4) of the National Conference meeting the defending league champion Cleveland Browns (11–1) of the American Conference. In the league championship game for the third straight year, the Rams were seeking their first NFL title since moving to California in early 1946 (the Cleveland Rams won the 1945 title, then left a month later). The Browns were favored to win this title game on the road by six points.

This was the first NFL championship game to be televised coast-to-coast, and was blacked out by the league in the southern California area. The DuMont Network purchased the championship game TV rights from the NFL in May for five years (1951–55) for $475,000.

The home underdog Rams upset the Browns 24–17 for their second NFL championship before a then-record crowd for the title game of 59,475. The "World Championship" banner awarded to the Rams was given as a gift to Tom Bergin after the game in gratitude for hosting the post-game dinner. As of 2016 it still hangs in the Tom Bergin's Irish pub in Los Angeles, the only one in private ownership. This was also the first time that the Browns under Paul Brown did not finish the season with a championship after 4 wins in the AAFC and a championship in their first NFL season in 1950.

This was the first professional sports championship ever won by a Los Angeles-based team and was the Rams' only NFL championship as a California team until 2022 when they won Super Bowl LVI against the Cincinnati Bengals, which is coincidentally the team founded by Brown. The Rams won their first NFL championship during their final season in Cleveland, and also won Super Bowl XXXIV during their fifth season in St. Louis.

== Game summary ==
After a missed field-goal attempt by Cleveland on its opening drive, the Rams were the first to score, with a 1-yard run by fullback Dick Hoerner in the second quarter. The Browns answered back with an NFL Championship record 52-yard field goal by Lou Groza, following the first of two interceptions by Rams QB Bob Waterfield, who would later be replaced by Norm van Brocklin. The Browns later took the lead with a 17-yard touchdown pass from Otto Graham to Dub Jones, which accounted for the halftime score of 10–7.

In the third quarter, Ram Larry Brink landed a hard tackle on Graham, causing him to fumble the ball, which Andy Robustelli picked up on the Cleveland 24 and returned it to the two-yard-line. On third down from the one, "Deacon" Dan Towler ran the ball in for a touchdown to give the Rams a 14–10 lead.

After Graham threw an interception in two of the Browns' next three possessions, the Rams increased their lead with a 17-yard field goal by former local UCLA great Bob Waterfield early in the fourth quarter. The Browns answered back with an 8-play, 70-yard drive that ended with a 5-yard touchdown run by Ken Carpenter to tie the game at 17–17.

Twenty-five seconds later, Tom Fears beat defenders Cliff Lewis and Tommy James, and received a Norm Van Brocklin pass at midfield and raced to the end zone for a 73-yard touchdown. Van Brocklin had entered the game at quarterback for Bob Waterfield, whose two first-half interceptions accounted for two of the Rams' three turnovers.

The go-ahead touchdown from Van Brocklin to Fears was followed by Graham's third interception of the game and two more empty possessions by the Browns and thus secured the Rams' first NFL title in Los Angeles. Their second title in Los Angeles came in February 2022.

The next NFL title for the franchise came 48 years later, when the St. Louis Rams won Super Bowl XXXIV in January 2000.

=== Scoring summary ===
Los Angeles Rams 24, Cleveland Browns 17

Quarter	1	2	3	4	Total
Browns	0	10	0	7	17
Rams	0	7	7	10	24

at Los Angeles Memorial Coliseum, Los Angeles, California

- Date: December 23, 1951
- Game time: 1:05 p.m. PST
- Pro-Football-Reference

Game information
- First quarter
  - no scoring
- Second quarter
  - LA – Dick Hoerner 1-yard run (Bob Waterfield kick). Rams 7–0
  - CLE – Lou Groza 52-yard field goal. Rams 7–3
  - CLE – Dub Jones 17-yard pass from Otto Graham (Groza kick). Browns 10–7
- Third quarter
  - LA – Dan Towler 1-yard run (Waterfield kick). Rams 14–10
- Fourth quarter
  - LA – Bob Waterfield 17-yard field goal, 17–10 LA
  - CLE – Ken Carpenter 5-yard run (Groza kick). Tied 17–17
  - LA – Tom Fears 73-yard pass from Norm Van Brocklin (Waterfield kick). Rams 24–17

== Officials ==
- Referee: Ronald Gibbs
- Umpire: Samuel Wilson
- Head linesman: Dan Tehan
- Back judge: Norman Duncan
- Field judge: Lloyd Brazil
- Alternate: Emil Heintz
- Alternate: Cletus Gardner

The NFL added the fifth official, the back judge, in 1947; the line judge arrived in 1965, and the side judge in 1978.

== Players' shares ==
The gross receipts for the game, including $75,000 for radio and television rights, was just under $326,000, the highest to date, passing the previous record of $283,000 five years earlier in 1946. Each player on the winning Rams team received $2,108, while Browns players made $1,483 each.

== Bibliography ==
- NFL Chronology: 1951. NFL.com. Retrieved September 17, 2006.
- Brown, Paul; with Clary, Jack (1979). PB, the Paul Brown Story. New York: Atheneum.
- Hession, Joseph (1987). The Rams: Five Decades of Football. San Francisco: Foghorn Press.
- MacCambridge, Michael (2005). America's Game. New York: Anchor Books ISBN 978-0-307-48143-6
- Powers, Ron (1984). Supertube: The Rise of Television Sports. New York: Coward-McCann. ISBN 0-698-11253-9
- Rader, Benjamin G. (1984). In its Own Image: How Television Has Transformed Sports. New York: The Free Press. ISBN 0-02-925700-X pp. 83–99.
- Riffenburgh, Beau, (1997). "Championships & Playoffs." Eds Silverman, Matthew, et al. Total Football II: The Official Encyclopedia of the National Football League. New York: HarperCollins. 178–262. ISBN 0-06-270174-6
- Sauerbrie, Harold (December 23, 1951). "Browns Lose Title to Rams, 24–17". Cleveland Plain Dealer. Cleveland Live, LLC. p. 18. Archived from the original on October 1, 2012.
