= 1950 Cleveland Browns season =

NFL team season

- Owner: Mickey McBride
- General manager: Paul Brown
- Head coach: Paul Brown
- Home stadium: Cleveland Stadium

Results
- Record: 10–2
- Division place: 1st NFL American
- Playoffs: Won Conference Playoff (vs. Giants) 8–3; Won NFL Championship (vs. Rams) 30–28
- All-Pros: Marion Motley; Mac Speedie
- Pro Bowlers: Tony Adamle, FB; Otto Graham, QB; Lou Groza, T/K; Weldon Humble, G Marion Motley, FB; Mac Speedie, E Bill Willis, LB

The 1950 Cleveland Browns season was the team's first in the National Football League (NFL) after playing the previous four years in the All-America Football Conference (AAFC), which folded after the 1949 season. The Browns finished the regular season with a 10–2 win–loss record and beat the Los Angeles Rams to win their first NFL championship in franchise history in their first NFL season. It was Cleveland's fifth consecutive championship victory, the previous four having come in the AAFC.

Cleveland added 12 new players to its roster before the season began, several of whom came from other AAFC teams that had dissolved as part of a selective merger of the Browns, the Baltimore Colts and the San Francisco 49ers into the NFL in 1949. They included guard Abe Gibron, who went on to a 10-year football career, and Len Ford, a defensive end who had a Hall of Fame career with the Browns. The team's top draft choice was halfback Ken Carpenter.

After winning all five of their preseason games, the Browns faced the two-time defending champion Philadelphia Eagles in their first regular-season game. Many sportswriters and owners considered the Browns inferior despite their success in the AAFC, calling them the dominant team in a minor league, but Cleveland defeated Philadelphia 35–10, the first of 10 victories on the season. Cleveland's only two losses came against the New York Giants, with whom the team shared a 10–2 record at the end of the regular season. Philadelphia only finished 6-6 in 1950. They were obviously not the same team that won back to back titles in 1948 and 1949.

The tie forced a playoff to determine whether the Browns or Giants would win the American Conference and play in the championship game. Cleveland won the playoff 8–3 in freezing weather at Cleveland Stadium. A week later, on Christmas Eve, the Browns faced the Rams at home in the championship. Cleveland fell behind 28–20 in the fourth quarter against the Rams' potent offense, but quarterback Otto Graham engineered a comeback with a touchdown pass to Rex Bumgardner and a long drive that set up a winning field goal by Lou Groza with 28 seconds left to play. It was the first of six straight NFL championship appearances for the Browns. Cleveland fullback Marion Motley led the NFL in rushing, and seven Browns were selected to play in the first-ever Pro Bowl, the league's all-star game.

The 1950 Browns ranked #25 on the 100 greatest teams of all time presented by the NFL on its 100th anniversary. They were the highest ranked team from a season before the 1960s.

== Joining the NFL ==
The Cleveland Browns were founded and started play in 1946 in the All-America Football Conference (AAFC), a league formed to compete with the more established National Football League (NFL). The team was a success both financially and on the field under head coach Paul Brown, drawing large crowds and winning all four of the AAFC's championships between 1946 and 1949. In a bid to end a competition for talent that raised player salaries and ate into owners' profits at a time when attendance in many large markets was declining, the NFL and AAFC agreed to a peace deal at the end of the 1949 season. Under the deal, four of the AAFC's seven teams were to go out of business, while three of them – the Browns, Baltimore Colts and San Francisco 49ers – would play in the NFL starting in 1950.

Cleveland had been the AAFC's most successful team, but some NFL owners and sportswriters considered the Browns an inferior competitor – the top team in a lesser league. George Preston Marshall, the owner of the Washington Redskins, said the NFL's weakest team "could toy with the Browns". The AAFC had proposed an inter-league matchup between the AAFC and NFL champions in each year of its existence, but the NFL owners rebuffed those approaches each time. The Browns' entry into the NFL thus became the first time the team would be tested against NFL competition. NFL commissioner Bert Bell scheduled the team's first game against the Philadelphia Eagles, the two-time defending NFL champions. The Browns and Eagles were to play in Philadelphia on a Saturday, one day before the other NFL teams began their seasons, further spotlighting the matchup.

== Offseason and roster moves ==
The dissolution of the AAFC left 13 professional football teams in the U.S., a significant reduction from the 17 in existence the year before. That resulted in a large pool of players without teams. As part of the AAFC and NFL owners' peace deal, the Browns and the AAFC's Buffalo Bills reached an agreement under which the Browns would get the rights to guard Abe Gibron, defensive tackle John Kissell and halfback Rex Bumgardner. In exchange, Bills owner James Breuil got an ownership stake in the Browns. Similar deals were made between former AAFC owners and NFL teams in Los Angeles and New York City. The players left over after those deals were entered into a special draft from which the Browns selected defensive end Len Ford from the Los Angeles Dons and linebacker Hal Herring from the Bills. Gibron went on to a 10-year pro career, Kissell was a starter for the Browns for six seasons, and Herring played for three years. Ford, a tall and hard-hitting pass-rusher, became one of the top defensive ends of his era. He was inducted into the Pro Football Hall of Fame in 1976.

Cleveland added several more players to its roster in the 1950 NFL draft, selecting halfback Ken Carpenter in the first round and tackle John Sandusky and guard Jim Martin in the second. Later selections included fullback Emerson Cole, halfback Don Phelps and defensive back Dom Moselle. Those additions aimed to replenish a backfield depleted by the departure of Edgar Jones, Bill Boedeker, Les Horvath and Ara Parseghian. Ken Gorgal, a lanky safety from Purdue, was another draft pick who earned a starting role in his rookie year, supplanting long-time starter Cliff Lewis.

The Browns also tried to acquire Doak Walker, a Southern Methodist University back who had won the Heisman Trophy the previous year. Cleveland had chosen Walker in the 1949 AAFC draft, while the Detroit Lions had secured his NFL rights in a trade with the New York Bulldogs. Both teams claimed him after the Browns entered the NFL, leading to a dispute that was settled by giving Walker to Detroit and awarding Cleveland an extra second-round draft pick. Cleveland used the pick to select Sandusky, while Walker went on to have a hall-of-fame career with the Lions.

The 1950 season was one of major change for the Browns, with seven rookies on the roster and 12 new players overall. They joined an offense that featured quarterback Otto Graham, fullback Marion Motley and ends Mac Speedie and Dante Lavelli and a defense that featured linebacker Bill Willis and defensive back Warren Lahr. Two of the new players – Ford and Cole – were African-Americans, joining Willis, Motley and Horace Gillom to bring the number of black players on the team to five. With the additions, the Browns employed about a third of all the black players in the NFL at the time.

=== NFL draft selections ===
1950 Cleveland Browns draft
Round	Pick	Player	Position	College	Notes
1	13	Ken Carpenter *	Halfback	Oregon State	Pro Bowl (1951)
2	18	John Sandusky	Tackle	Villanova	Selection acquired from Detroit Lions
2	26	Jim Martin *	End	Notre Dame	Pro Bowl (1961)
3	39	Jimmy Joe Robinson	Halfback	Pittsburgh	
4	52	Red Wilson	Center	Wisconsin	
5	65	Don Phelps	Halfback	Kentucky	
6	78	Ken Gorgal	Halfback	Purdue	
7	91	Win Carter	Halfback	Missouri	
8	104	Russ Frizzell	Tackle	Tulsa	
9	117	Jim Duncan	End	Wake Forest	
10	130	Frank O'Pella	Halfback	William & Mary	
11	143	Bob Plotz	Guard	Pittsburgh	
12	156	Emerson Cole	Fullback	Toledo	
13	169	Rupe Wright	Guard	Baylor	
14	182	Packard Harrington	Center	St. Mary's (CA)	
15	195	Ted Meland	Guard	Oregon	
16	208	Art King	Guard	Ball State	
17	221	Hal McKinney	Guard	Missouri Valley	
18	234	Joe Travue	Halfback	Louisville	
19	247	Butch Songin	Quarterback	Boston College	
20	260	John Hackney	Guard	Murray State	
21	273	Leroy Vogts	Guard	Washington (St. Louis)	
22	286	Jim Dowling	Guard	Santa Clara	
23	299	Dom Moselle	Halfback	Wisconsin-Superior	
24	312	Jack Woodland	Halfback	Bowling Green	
25	325	Jim Brasher	Center	Maryland	
26	338	Charley Toogood	Tackle	Nebraska	
27	351	Dick Gray	Halfback	Oregon State	
28	364	Billy Pyle	Halfback	Texas	
29	377	Bob Schnelker *	End	Bowling Green	2× Pro Bowl (1958, 1959)
30	390	Jim Massey	Halfback	Detroit	
Made roster † Pro Football Hall of Fame * Made at least one Pro Bowl during career

== Roster and coaching staff ==
1950 Cleveland Browns roster
Quarterbacks: 60 Otto Graham; Running backs: 90 Rex Bumgardner; 84 Ken Carpenter CB; 70 Emerson Cole OLB; 86 Dub Jones; 92 Dom Moselle; 76 Marion Motley; 94 Don Phelps CB; Receivers: 59 Horace Gillom P/DE; 56 Dante Lavelli; 58 Mac Speedie	Offensive linemen: 22 Frank Gatski C; 34 Abe Gibron G; 46 Lou Groza T/K; 32 Lin Houston G; 38 Weldon Humble G/MLB; 44 Lou Rymkus T; Defensive linemen: 53 Len Ford DE; 48 Chubby Grigg DT/K; 45 John Kissell DT; 50 Jim Martin DE; 42 Derrell Palmer DT/T; 49 John Sandusky DT; 30 Bill Willis MG; 52 George Young DE	Linebackers: 74 Tony Adamle OLB/FB; 35 Alex Agase MLB/MG; 20 Hal Herring OLB; 23 Tommy Thompson MLB/C; Defensive backs: 85 Ken Gorgal S; 82 Tommy James CB; 80 Warren Lahr CB; 62 Cliff Lewis S/QB; Head Coach: Paul Brown; Assistants: Blanton Collier (Backfield); Weeb Ewbank (Tackles); Fritz Heisler (Guards); Tim Temerario (Ends); rookies in italics

== Preseason ==
Cleveland held its training camp in Bowling Green, Ohio, as it had each year since its first season in 1946. The team played five exhibition games, against the Green Bay Packers, Baltimore Colts, Detroit Lions, Chicago Bears and Pittsburgh Steelers.

=== Schedule ===
Week	Date	Opponent	Result	Record	Game site	Attendance	Game Recap
1	August 12	Green Bay Packers	W 38–7	1–0	Glass Bowl	10,000 (est.)	Recap
2	August 19	Baltimore Colts	W 34–7	2–0	Nippert Stadium	22,500 (est.)	Recap
3	August 25	Detroit Lions	W 35–14	3–0	Rubber Bowl	23,670	Recap
4	September 1	Chicago Bears	W 27–23	4–0	Cleveland Stadium	51,076	Recap
5	September 4	Pittsburgh Steelers	W 41–31	5–0	War Memorial Stadium	15,259	Recap

=== Game summaries ===
==== Week 1: vs. Green Bay Packers ====
Team	1	2	3	4	Total
Packers	7	0	0	0	7
• Browns	14	10	7	7	38

- Date: August 14
- Location: Glass Bowl, Toledo, Ohio
- Game attendance: 10,000
- Source: Plain Dealer

Scoring summary
1	GNB	Ted Cook pass from Earl Girard (Ted Fritsch kick)	GNB 7–0
1	CLE	Dub Jones 62-yard pass from Otto Graham (Lou Groza kick)	7–7
1	CLE	Dante Lavelli 51-yard pass from Otto Graham (Lou Groza kick)	CLE 14–7
2	CLE	Lou Groza 10-yard field goal	CLE 17–7
2	CLE	Dante Lavelli 18-yard pass from Otto Graham (Lou Groza kick)	CLE 24–7
3	CLE	Don Phelps 87-yard rush (Lou Groza kick)	CLE 31–7
4	CLE	Rex Bumgardner touchdown (Lou Groza kick)	CLE 38–7

The Browns beat the Green Bay Packers 38–7 in their first preseason game, played before a crowd of about 10,000 at the Toledo, Ohio Glass Bowl. The Packers got out to an early 7–0 lead on their first drive, a 73-yard advance capped by a touchdown pass to Ted Cook. Cleveland responded with a touchdown from quarterback Otto Graham to end Dante Lavelli on the ensuing drive, tying the score. Cleveland's Alex Agase blocked a punt later in the quarter that set up a Lou Groza field goal on the first play of the second quarter. Lavelli caught another touchdown pass from Graham to give the Browns a 24–7 halftime lead. While Brown rested Graham for most of the second half of the game, the Browns built on their lead with an 87-yard rushing touchdown by rookie Don Phelps and another score by Rex Bumgardner. Phelps suffered a head injury in the game and did not remember making the run, the longest rush from scrimmage in team history to that point. He got X-rays after the game and spent two nights in the hospital after being diagnosed with a mild concussion. Brown was pleased with the team's performance after just three weeks of training camp, saying Phelps "looked a knife cutting across the field".

==== Week 2: vs. Baltimore Colts ====
Team	1	2	3	4	Total
Colts	7	0	0	0	7
• Browns	14	3	3	14	34

- Date: August 19
- Location: Nippert Stadium, Cincinnati
- Game attendance: 22,500
- Source: Plain Dealer

Scoring summary
1	CLE	Dub Jones 18-yard pass from Otto Graham (Lou Groza kick)	CLE 7–0
1	BAL	Billy Stone 100-yard kickoff return (Rex Grossman kick)	7–7
1	CLE	Otto Graham 1-yard rush (Lou Groza kick)	CLE 14–7
2	CLE	Lou Groza 23-yard field goal	CLE 17–7
3	CLE	Lou Groza 42-yard field goal	CLE 20–7
4	CLE	Dom Moselle 5-yard rush (Lou Groza kick)	CLE 27–7
4	CLE	Tom O'Malley 2-yard rush (Lou Groza kick)	CLE 34–7

Cleveland beat the Baltimore Colts, a rival from the old AAFC, in its second preseason game. Scoring in the game, played in Cincinnati, began with an 18-yard passing touchdown from Graham to halfback Dub Jones in the first quarter. Baltimore's Billy Stone received the ensuing kickoff and ran it back 100 yards for a touchdown to tie the game at 7–7. Graham then led the team on a 75-yard drive composed mostly of passes to Lavelli that ended with a one-yard touchdown by Graham on a quarterback sneak. A short field goal by Groza gave the Browns a 17–7 lead at halftime. The Browns widened the lead with another Groza field goal in the third period and a touchdown set up by a 63-yard punt return by Ken Carpenter at the beginning of the fourth. Holding a 20-point lead, Brown rested his starters and sent in a squad composed entirely of rookies. The rookies managed another touchdown on a two-yard rush by Tom O'Malley that was set up by a Carpenter interception, giving Cleveland the 34–7 win. Cleveland's defense played well, allowing 42 net rushing yards and 86 passing yards.

==== Week 3: vs. Detroit Lions ====
Team	1	2	3	4	Total
Lions	0	0	0	14	14
• Browns	21	0	7	7	35

- Date: August 25
- Location: Rubber Bowl, Akron, Ohio
- Game attendance: 23,670
- Source: Plain Dealer

Scoring summary
1	CLE	Dub Jones 24-yard pass from Otto Graham (Lou Groza kick)	CLE 7–0
1	CLE	Otto Graham 1-yard rush (Lou Groza kick)	CLE 14–0
1	CLE	Rex Bumgardner 8-yard rush (Lou Groza kick)	CLE 21–0
3	CLE	Marion Motley 41-yard rush (Lou Groza kick)	CLE 28–0
4	DET	Dan Sandifer 2-yard rush (Doak Walker kick)	CLE 28–7
4	DET	John Panelli 2-yard rush (Doak Walker kick)	CLE 28–14
4	CLE	Rex Bumgardner 7-yard pass from Otto Graham (Lou Groza kick)	CLE 35–14

Cleveland won its third preseason game in a row over the Detroit Lions at the Rubber Bowl in Akron, Ohio. Graham threw a touchdown pass to Jones on the team's second offensive play after receiving the opening kickoff, the first of three touchdowns in the first quarter. The second score came on a one-yard rush by Graham set up by several passes to Jones on the team's second possession. The third was an eight-yard run by Rex Bumgardner at the end of the quarter. Neither team scored in the second quarter, although Cleveland had two touchdowns called back because of penalties. A 41-yard rushing touchdown by Motley extended Cleveland's lead to 28–0 in the third quarter, and Brown rested his starters. With Cleveland's best players out of the game, Detroit scored two touchdowns in the fourth quarter on a pair of two-yard rushes by Dan Sandifer and John Panelli. Brown put his starters back in the game following Detroit's second touchdown, and a Graham pass to Bumgardner sealed the 35–14 win.

==== Week 4: vs. Chicago Bears ====
Team	1	2	3	4	Total
Bears	7	3	0	13	23
• Browns	7	10	0	10	27

- Date: September 1
- Location: Cleveland Stadium
- Game attendance: 51,076
- Source: Plain Dealer

Scoring summary
1	CHI	Jim Keane pass from Johnny Lujack (Johnny Lujack kick)	CHI 7–0
1	CLE	Rex Bumgardner 2-yard rush (Lou Groza kick)	7–7
2	CHI	George Blanda field goal	CHI 10–7
2	CHI	Lou Groza 30-yard field goal	10–10
2	CLE	Dub Jones pass from Otto Graham (Lou Groza kick)	CLE 17–10
4	CLE	Ken Carpenter 79-yard punt return (Lou Groza kick)	CLE 24–10
4	CLE	Lou Groza 21-yard field goal	CLE 27–10
4	CHI	Ken Kavanaugh pass from Johnny Lujack (Johnny Lujack kick)	CLE 27–17
4	CHI	Ken Kavanaugh pass from Johnny Lujack (kick failed)	CLE 27–23

The Browns beat the Bears in their fourth preseason game and the first matchup of the season at Cleveland Stadium. Chicago quarterback Johnny Lujack gave the Bears the game's first score with a touchdown pass to Jim Keane nine minutes into the first quarter. Cleveland tied the score later in the quarter with a two-yard Bumgardner rush. Chicago took the lead on a second-quarter field goal by George Blanda, but a Groza field goal later in the period evened the score. Near the end of the quarter, Jones fell as he caught a pass from Graham, but managed to get back up and run it in for a touchdown, giving the Browns a 17–10 lead at halftime. Neither team scored in the third quarter, but the Browns began to pull away at the beginning of the fourth when Carpenter took a high punt by Fred "Curly" Morrison on his own 21-yard line and returned it for a touchdown. He got help on the play from a block at midfield by Phelps. Groza then kicked another field goal to put the Browns up by 17 points. Chicago scored two touchdowns as the game was out of reach in the fourth quarter, both of them passes from Lujack to Ken Kavanaugh.

==== Week 5: vs. Pittsburgh Steelers ====
Team	1	2	3	4	Total
Steelers	7	3	7	14	31
• Browns	7	17	14	3	41

- Date: September 4
- Location: War Memorial Stadium, Buffalo, New York
- Game attendance: 15,259
- Source: Plain Dealer

Scoring summary
1	PIT	Jerry Shipkey 1-yard rush (Joe Geri kick)	PIT 7–0
1	CLE	Rex Bumgardner 35-yard rush (Lou Groza kick)	7–7
2	CLE	Marion Motley 13-yard pass from Otto Graham (Lou Groza kick)	CLE 14–7
2	PIT	Joe Geri 37-yard field goal	CLE 14–10
2	CLE	Mac Speedie rush (Lou Groza kick)	CLE 21–10
2	CLE	Lou Groza 30-yard field goal	CLE 24–10
3	CLE	Emerson Cole 21-yard rush (Lou Groza kick)	CLE 31–10
3	PIT	Jerry Shipkey 1-yard rush (Joe Geri kick)	CLE 31–17
3	CLE	Bill Boedeker 65-yard rush (Lou Groza kick)	CLE 38–17
4	PIT	Howard Hartley 35-yard interception return (Joe Geri kick)	CLE 38–24
4	PIT	Bobby Gage 64-yard pass from Joe Gasparella (Joe Geri kick)	CLE 38–31
4	CLE	Lou Groza field goal	CLE 41–31

Cleveland beat the Steelers in the final game of the preseason, played at War Memorial Stadium in Buffalo, New York just three days after the Browns beat the Bears. Pittsburgh began the scoring in the first quarter with a one-yard rushing touchdown by Jerry Shipkey. The Browns responded with a touchdown run by Bumgardner in the first quarter on a Statue of Liberty play. Another touchdown run by Motley in the second period gave the Browns a 14–7 lead. After a Pittsburgh field goal, Cleveland added a touchdown and a field goal later in the second quarter to go ahead 24–10 at halftime. The Browns continued their scoring streak in the third quarter as a long kickoff return by Carpenter set up a 21-yard rushing touchdown by Emerson Cole. Shipkey scored one touchdown in the third quarter and two in the fourth, one of them a 35-yard interception return by Howard Hartley, but the Browns scored another touchdown and field goal to seal a 41–31 victory. Brown rested his starters for the fourth quarter, as he had in previous preseason games. Cleveland's offense had 194 rushing yards and 289 passing yards, compared to 282 yards of total offense by the Steelers.

== Regular season ==
After winning all of its preseason games, Cleveland prepared to face the defending champion Philadelphia Eagles to open the regular season. The victory over the Bears, who finished near the top of the NFL's Western Conference in 1949, appeared to prove that the team could compete in the new league, but Eagles coach Greasy Neale did not take the Browns seriously. Led by an offense that featured Graham, Motley and Lavelli, all of whom were later inducted into the Pro Football Hall of Fame, the Browns beat the Eagles in Philadelphia and went on to finish the regular season with a 10–2 record for first place in the league's American Division. Their losses both came against the New York Giants.

=== Results ===
Week	Date	Opponent	Result	Record	Venue	Attendance	Recap
1	September 16	at **Philadelphia Eagles**	**W** 35–10	1–0	Philadelphia Municipal Stadium	71,237	Recap
2	September 24	at Baltimore Colts	**W** 31–0	2–0	Municipal Stadium	15,201	Recap
3	October 1	**New York Giants**	**L** 0–6	2–1	Cleveland Stadium	37,647	Recap
4	October 7	at **Pittsburgh Steelers**	**W** 30–17	3–1	Forbes Field	35,590	Recap
5	October 15	**Chicago Cardinals**	**W** 34–24	4–1	Cleveland Stadium	33,774	Recap
6	October 22	at **New York Giants**	**L** 13–17	4–2	Polo Grounds	41,734	Recap
7	October 29	**Pittsburgh Steelers**	**W** 45–7	5–2	Cleveland Stadium	40,714	Recap
8	November 5	at **Chicago Cardinals**	**W** 10–7	6–2	Comiskey Park	38,456	Recap
9	November 12	San Francisco 49ers	**W** 34–14	7–2	Cleveland Stadium	28,786	Recap
10	November 19	**Washington Redskins**	**W** 20–14	8–2	Cleveland Stadium	21,908	Recap
11	Bye						
12	December 3	**Philadelphia Eagles**	**W** 13–7	9–2	Cleveland Stadium	37,490	Recap
13	December 10	at **Washington Redskins**	**W** 45–21	10–2	Griffith Stadium	30,143	Recap
Note: Intra-conference opponents are in **bold** text.

=== Game summaries ===
==== Week 1: vs. Philadelphia Eagles ====
Team	1	2	3	4	Total
• **Browns**	7	7	7	14	35
Eagles	3	0	0	7	10

- Date: September 16
- Location: Philadelphia Municipal Stadium
- Game attendance: 71,237
- Source: Cleveland Plain Dealer

Scoring summary
1	PHI	Cliff Patton 17-yard field goal	PHI 3–0
1	CLE	Dub Jones 59-yard pass from Otto Graham (Chubby Grigg kick)	CLE 7–3
2	CLE	Dante Lavelli 26-yard pass from Otto Graham (Chubby Grigg kick)	CLE 14–3
3	CLE	Mac Speedie 12-yard pass from Otto Graham (Chubby Grigg kick)	CLE 21–3
4	PHI	Pete Pihos 17-yard pass from Bill Mackrides (Cliff Patton kick)	CLE 21–10
4	CLE	Otto Graham 1-yard rush (Chubby Grigg kick)	CLE 28–10
4	CLE	Rex Baumgardner 2-yard rush (Chubby Grigg kick)	CLE 35–10

Before the game against Philadelphia, Brown told his players that Cleveland's successful years in the AAFC were at stake against the Eagles. "There's not only this season at stake, but four years of achievements", he told them. "I'm asking you to dedicate yourselves to preserving the reputation the Browns have made". The Eagles punted after their first drive stalled, and Cleveland's Don Phelps returned the kick 64 yards for a touchdown. The score was called back on a clipping penalty, however. Groza injured his arm on the play and sat out the rest of the game. Philadelphia made the first score of the game, a 17-yard field goal by Cliff Patton. The Browns tried to respond with a field goal of their own, but Chubby Grigg, substituting for Groza, missed the attempt. Jones scored a touchdown later in the first quarter on a pass from Graham, putting Cleveland in the lead. Another touchdown pass from Graham to Lavelli at the end of the second quarter put Cleveland ahead 14–3 at halftime. The Browns extended the lead on their first possession of the third quarter, an 80-yard drive capped by a short touchdown pass to end Mac Speedie. Turnovers by Philadelphia and then by the Browns set up a touchdown for the Eagles at the beginning of the fourth quarter to narrow Cleveland's lead to 11 points. The Browns added two touchdowns toward the end of the game, the first on a one-yard quarterback sneak by Graham and the second a short run by Bumgardner that was set up by a Lahr interception. The Browns had 316 passing yards and 141 rushing yards in the 35–10 win. A crowd of 71,237 people saw the game, an attendance record in Philadelphia and the ninth-largest in professional football history at the time. NFL commissioner Bert Bell named Graham the team's most valuable player and gave him a trophy, calling the Browns "the greatest team to ever play the game". Neale congratulated the Browns on the win, but critiqued the team for its reliance on passing, equating it to a basketball team. Brown said the team would not gloat over the victory, citing a long season ahead.

==== Week 2: vs. Baltimore Colts ====
Team	1	2	3	4	Total
• **Browns**	17	0	7	7	31
Colts	0	0	0	0	0

- Date: September 24
- Location: Municipal Stadium
- Game attendance: 15,201
- Source: Pro Football Reference

Scoring summary
1	CLE	Dante Lavelli 38-yard pass from Otto Graham (Chubby Grigg kick)	CLE 7–0
1	CLE	Chubby Grigg 19-yard field goal	CLE 10–0
1	CLE	Dub Jones 11-yard rush (Chubby Grigg kick)	CLE 17–0
3	CLE	Dub Jones 61-yard rush (Chubby Grigg kick)	CLE 24–0
4	CLE	Ken Carpenter 61-yard rush (Chubby Grigg kick)	CLE 31–0

Cleveland next traveled to Baltimore to face the Colts, winning 31–0. Cleveland scored three times in the first quarter, getting out to a 17–0 lead. The first was a 38-yard touchdown pass from Graham to Lavelli on the team's second play from scrimmage. Grigg kicked a short field goal on the team's next possession, and Jones ran for the third score, an 11-yard touchdown. Graham threw four interceptions in the game, including on his first two passes of the second half, giving Baltimore several opportunities to score. While the Colts reached the Browns' 2-yard line twice, the Cleveland defense forced a turnover on downs both times. Jones ran for another touchdown in the third quarter, a 61-yard rush that capped a two-play, 82-yard drive. In the waning minutes of the game, Ken Gorgal intercepted a Baltimore pass and lateraled it to Lahr, who returned it 21 yards. On the second play of the ensuing possession, Carpenter took a handoff from Cliff Lewis, who was substituting for Graham, and ran it 61 yards for another touchdown.

==== Week 3: vs. New York Giants ====
Team	1	2	3	4	Total
• **Giants**	6	0	0	0	6
Browns	0	0	0	0	0

- Date: October 1
- Location: Cleveland Stadium
- Game attendance: 37,647
- Source: Pro Football Reference

Scoring summary
1	NYG	Eddie Price 2-yard rush (kick failed)	NYG 6–0

Cleveland lost its first game of the season and was shut out for the first time in 62 games against the Giants in Cleveland. Unlike the Eagles, the Giants prepared carefully for the Browns and were able to stop the team's potent passing attack. After the Browns beat Philadelphia, Giants coach Steve Owen scouted the team and resolved to use an innovative umbrella defense, a formation where the defensive ends were used to cover passes. This freed the team's linebackers and safeties to cover passes over the middle of the field. The Giants advanced 52 yards on a drive in the first quarter, ending with a touchdown run by Eddie Price. The extra point attempt failed, but the six points were enough to win the game as New York's defensive strategy paid dividends. Graham had no completions in the first half and threw four interceptions. Cleveland had several opportunities to score late in the game, including a drive set up by a good punt return by Dom Moselle that ended with a fumble. Graham also missed on passes to Speedie and Horace Gillom in the end zone in the fourth quarter.

This game remained the only one of Otto Graham's entire 126 game career where he was shutout.

==== Week 4: vs. Pittsburgh Steelers ====
Team	1	2	3	4	Total
• **Browns**	7	14	2	7	30
Steelers	3	0	7	7	17

- Date: October 7
- Location: Forbes Field
- Game attendance: 35,590
- Source: Pro Football Reference

Scoring summary
1	PIT	Joe Geri 30-yard field goal	PIT 3–0
1	CLE	Otto Graham 1-yard rush (Lou Groza kick)	CLE 7–3
2	CLE	Otto Graham 1-yard rush (Lou Groza kick)	CLE 14–3
2	CLE	Dub Jones 2-yard rush (Lou Groza kick)	CLE 21–3
3	CLE	Safety, Lynn Chandnois tackled in the end zone by John Kissell	CLE 23–3
3	PIT	Charlie Seabright 13-yard pass from Joe Geri (Joe Geri kick)	CLE 23–10
4	CLE	Dub Jones 48-yard rush (Lou Groza kick)	CLE 30–10
4	PIT	Jerry Shipkey 1-yard rush (Joe Geri kick)	CLE 30–17

Cleveland beat the Steelers in the fourth game of the regular season. Pittsburgh took the lead on a 30-yard field goal by Joe Geri early in the first quarter. Moselle returned a punt 46 yards to Pittsburgh's 19-yard line later in the period, leading to a drive that ended with a one-yard touchdown on a quarterback sneak by Graham. A Pittsburgh fumble in the second quarter gave Cleveland the ball at the Steelers' 39-yard line, setting up another score on a sneak by Graham. Pittsburgh's Howard Hartley fumbled a punt later in the quarter and Cleveland recovered, leading to another touchdown, this time a 2-yard run by Jones. An errant snap on the Steelers' first play in the second half rolled into their own end zone, where Lynn Chandnois recovered but was tackled by John Kissell for a safety. Pittsburgh scored a touchdown later in the third quarter, narrowing the score to 23–10, but another score by Jones with nine minutes left to play clinched the victory.

==== Week 5: vs. Chicago Cardinals ====
Team	1	2	3	4	Total
Cardinals	10	7	7	0	24
• **Browns**	7	3	7	17	34

- Date: October 15
- Location: Cleveland Stadium
- Game attendance: 33,774
- Source: Pro Football Reference

Scoring summary
1	CHC	Fran Polsfoot 3-yard pass from Jim Hardy (Pat Harder kick)	CHC 7–0
1	CHC	Pat Harder 47-yard field goal	CHC 10–0
1	CLE	Otto Graham 7-yard rush (Lou Groza kick)	CHC 10–7
2	CLE	Lou Groza 33-yard field goal	10–10
2	CHC	Pat Harder 1-yard rush (Pat Harder kick)	CHC 17–10
3	CHC	Bob Shaw 36-yard pass from Jim Hardy (Pat Harder kick)	CHC 24–10
3	CLE	Dante Lavelli 29-yard pass from Otto Graham (Lou Groza kick)	CHC 24–17
4	CLE	Dante Lavelli 26-yard pass from Otto Graham (Lou Groza kick)	24–24
4	CLE	Lou Groza 19-yard field goal	CLE 27–24
4	CLE	Marion Motley 2-yard rush (Lou Groza kick)	CLE 34–24

The Browns beat the Chicago Cardinals at home in the fifth game of the season, bringing their record to four wins and one loss. Chicago scored a touchdown on their first possession, assisted by a defensive holding penalty against the Browns that gave the Cardinals a first down at Cleveland's three-yard line. A field goal by Pat Harder extended Chicago's lead to 10–0. Graham ran for a touchdown later in the first quarter after dropping back to pass near the end zone and finding room to run. Cleveland then evened the score in the second quarter with a field goal by Groza. The Cardinals scored another touchdown in the second quarter after a long drive on which the Browns were penalized for 41 yards, and led 17–10 at halftime. Chicago built on its lead six minutes into the third quarter with 36-yard passing touchdown set up by a short punt into the wind by Gillom. Graham and the Browns began to mount a comeback on the next drive with a 54-yard lateral play between Graham, Lavelli and Motley. Graham then threw a touchdown to Lavelli from 29 yards out. Another touchdown pass to Lavelli in the fourth quarter tied the game, and Cleveland took the lead for the first time with a 19-yard field goal by Groza. A touchdown run by Motley near the end of the game sealed the victory.

==== Week 6: vs. New York Giants ====
Team	1	2	3	4	Total
Browns	0	13	0	0	13
• **Giants**	3	0	7	7	17

- Date: October 22
- Location: Polo Grounds
- Game attendance: 41,734
- Source: Pro Football Reference

Scoring summary
1	NYG	Ray Poole 22-yard field goal	NYG 3–0
2	CLE	Lou Groza 18-yard field goal	3–3
2	CLE	Lou Groza 17-yard field goal	CLE 6–3
2	CLE	Otto Graham 1-yard rush (Lou Groza kick)	CLE 13–3
3	NYG	Forrest Griffith 4-yard rush (Ray Poole kick)	CLE 13–10
4	NYG	Joe Scott 2-yard rush (Ray Poole kick)	NYG 17–13

Cleveland lost to the Giants for the second time in the sixth game of the season at the Polo Grounds in New York. The Giants again managed to stymie the Browns' passing game, but employed a different strategy from the one they used in three weeks before. Instead of dropping their defensive ends into coverage to handle Cleveland's receivers, New York allowed single coverage on the receivers and had its ends rush Graham, giving him less time to find his men open. Graham lost 71 yards being tackled while dropping back to pass. A fumble by Graham early in the game was recovered by the Giants, leading to New York's first score, a 22-yard field goal. The Browns scored a field goal midway through the second quarter after going for it on fourth down at midfield and getting help from an interference penalty. Tony Adamle recovered a fumble on the ensuing kickoff, and the Browns drove into New York territory as time ran out in the first half. Groza kicked a field goal, putting the Browns ahead 6–3. After Cleveland kicked off to New York with only a few seconds left in the half, returner Jim Ostendarp let the ball roll to his own one-yard line and the Browns recovered the live ball. Graham then ran a quarterback sneak for a touchdown. The Giants dominated in the second half, scoring a touchdown on their second drive and adding another in the fourth quarter to win the game, 17–13. Graham was held to just 118 yards of passing on 10 completions. Cleveland defensive end Len Ford suffered a severe injury to his face during the game and had to be taken to the hospital. He sat out the remainder of the regular season and had to have his mouth wired shut so it could heal.

==== Week 7: vs. Pittsburgh Steelers ====
Team	1	2	3	4	Total
Steelers	0	0	0	7	7
• **Browns**	7	10	14	14	45

- Date: October 29
- Location: Cleveland Stadium
- Game attendance: 40,714
- Source: Pro Football Reference

Scoring summary
1	CLE	Otto Graham 1-yard rush (Lou Groza kick)	CLE 7–0
2	CLE	Lou Groza 13-yard field goal	CLE 10–0
2	CLE	Marion Motley 33-yard pass from Otto Graham (Lou Groza kick)	CLE 17–0
3	CLE	Marion Motley 69-yard rush (Lou Groza kick)	CLE 24–0
3	CLE	Don Phelps 14-yard rush (Lou Groza kick)	CLE 31–0
4	PIT	Bob Gage 29-yard pass from Joe Gasparella (Joe Geri kick)	CLE 31–7
4	CLE	Dub Jones 80-yard pass from Otto Graham (Lou Groza kick)	CLE 38–7
4	CLE	Horace Gillom 38-yard pass from Cliff Lewis (Lou Groza kick)	CLE 45–7

Cleveland handily beat the Steelers at home in their seventh game of the season. It was a breakout performance for Motley, who had 11 carries for 188 yards and two touchdown runs. A 61-yard return of the opening kickoff by Phelps set up the Browns' first touchdown, a short rush by Graham two and a half minutes into the first period. After stopping a pair of long Pittsburgh drives in the second quarter, Cleveland advanced to the Steelers' two-yard line but had to settle for a Groza field goal. Near the end of the half, Motley caught a pass from Graham and ran it in for another touchdown, putting Cleveland ahead 17–0. An interception by Gorgal on Pittsburgh's first drive of the third quarter led to Motley's second touchdown, a 69-yard run. Another interception by Jim Martin and a touchdown catch on the next drive by Phelps gave the Browns their fourth touchdown of the game and a commanding lead. Pittsburgh scored a touchdown on a two-play, 80-yard drive in the fourth quarter, but Cleveland added two more touchdowns at the end of the game to win 45–7.

==== Week 8: vs. Chicago Cardinals ====
Team	1	2	3	4	Total
• **Browns**	10	0	0	0	10
Cardinals	0	7	0	0	7

- Date: November 5
- Location: Comiskey Park
- Game attendance: 38,456
- Source: Pro Football Reference

Scoring summary
1	CLE	Dub Jones 33-yard rush (Lou Groza kick)	CLE 7–0
1	CLE	Lou Groza 17-yard field goal	CLE 10–0
2	CHC	Frank Tripucka 1-yard rush (Vinnie Yablonski kick)	CLE 10–7

Cleveland beat the Cardinals 10–7 in the eighth week in Chicago. The Cardinals got the ball first, but Cleveland took over when Tony Adamle recovered a fumble by Venton Yablonski. Jones took a pitch from Graham on the Browns' first play and ran it 33 yards for a touchdown. The Browns forced the Cardinals to punt on their next possession and started a drive from their own 27-yard line. A run by Bumgardner and a 26-yard reception by Lavelli helped set up a 17-yard Groza field goal, putting Cleveland up 10–0. The Browns had two more promising drives in the second quarter, but both ended with missed field goals. Chicago scored a touchdown before halftime, aided by a 64-yard pass from Frank Tripucka to Bob Shaw. Neither team scored in the second half, when both defenses performed well. The Cardinals stopped a long Cleveland drive in the fourth quarter that reached their two-yard line, but they were unable to score on their ensuing possession as time expired. The win gave the Browns the lead in the NFL's American Conference.

==== Week 9: vs. San Francisco 49ers ====
Team	1	2	3	4	Total
49ers	7	7	0	0	14
• **Browns**	7	7	3	17	34

- Date: November 12
- Location: Cleveland Stadium
- Game attendance: 28,786
- Source: Pro Football Reference

Scoring summary
1	SFO	Frankie Albert 1-yard rush (Gordie Soltau kick)	SFO 7–0
1	CLE	Dub Jones 7-yard pass from Otto Graham (Lou Groza kick)	7–7
2	CLE	Marion Motley 22-yard rush (Lou Groza kick)	CLE 14–7
2	SFO	Alyn Beals 28-yard pass from Frankie Albert (Gordie Soltau kick)	14–14
3	CLE	Lou Groza 22-yard field goal	CLE 17–14
4	CLE	Lou Groza 10-yard field goal	CLE 20–14
4	CLE	Dub Jones 3-yard rush (Lou Groza kick)	CLE 27–14
4	CHC	Rex Bumgardner 12-yard rush (Lou Groza kick)	CLE 34–14

Cleveland beat the San Francisco 49ers, an old rival from the AAFC, at home in the ninth game of the season. The 49ers scored first after blocking a Gillom punt and recovering at Cleveland's one-yard line in the first quarter. San Francisco 49ers quarterback Frankie Albert ran for a touchdown on the following play. The Browns' Chubby Grigg recovered a fumble by San Francisco's Sam Cathcart at the 49ers' seven-yard line near end of the first quarter, setting up a short touchdown pass from Graham to Jones. A 22-yard rushing touchdown by Motley put the Browns ahead midway through the second quarter, but San Francisco tied the game at the end of the half with a pass from Albert to Alyn Beals. A fumble by Joe Perry, one of five he made in the game, led to a Groza field goal 10 minutes into the third quarter. Groza added to the lead with another field goal in the fourth quarter, and the Browns surged ahead at the end of the game by capitalizing on San Francisco interceptions and fumbles. Both Jones and Bumgardner scored rushing touchdowns, securing a 34–14 win.

==== Week 10: vs. Washington Redskins ====
Team	1	2	3	4	Total
Redskins	0	7	7	0	14
• **Browns**	0	13	0	7	20

- Date: November 19
- Location: Cleveland Stadium
- Game attendance: 21,908
- Source: Pro Football Reference

Scoring summary
2	CLE	Lou Groza 30-yard field goal	CLE 3–0
2	CLE	Dante Lavelli 4-yard pass from Otto Graham (Lou Groza kick)	CLE 10–0
2	WAS	Hal Haynes 40-yard interception return (Bill Dudley kick)	CLE 10–7
2	CLE	Lou Groza 13-yard field goal	CLE 13–7
3	WAS	Rob Goode 2-yard rush (Bill Dudley kick)	WAS 14–13
4	CLE	Don Phelps 8-yard rush (Lou Groza kick)	CLE 20–14

The Browns beat the Washington Redskins in the 10th game of the season, improving their record to 8–2. After the Browns' first possession faltered, the Redskins took over and drove to the Browns' 22-yard line. The drive stalled there, however, and Washington missed a field goal attempt. Assisted by five Motley runs that gained 69 yards, the Browns scored the game's first points in the second quarter on a 30-yard field goal by Groza. Cleveland quickly added a touchdown on a throw from Graham to Lavelli after a Washington fumble. On the team's next possession, however, a Graham pass was intercepted by Washington's Hal Haynes and returned for a touchdown to narrow the score to 10–7. Another field goal by Groza left the score at 13–7 at halftime. Washington dominated the third quarter, holding the Browns' offense in check and driving for a two-yard rushing touchdown to take a one-point lead. The Browns, however, pulled out the victory in the fourth quarter with a touchdown run by Phelps. The win kept the Browns in first place in their conference as the season drew to a close. Motley had another strong game, rushing for 127 yards.

==== Week 12: vs. Philadelphia Eagles ====
Team	1	2	3	4	Total
Eagles	0	0	0	7	7
• **Browns**	7	3	3	0	13

- Date: December 3
- Location: Cleveland Stadium
- Game attendance: 37,490
- Source: Pro Football Reference

Scoring summary
1	CLE	Warren Lahr 30-yard interception return (Lou Groza kick)	CLE 7–0
2	CLE	Lou Groza 35-yard field goal	CLE 10–0
3	CLE	Lou Groza 43-yard field goal	CLE 13–0
4	PHI	Jim Parmer 2-yard rush (Cliff Patton kick)	CLE 13–7

After a bye in the 11th week of the season, the Browns beat the Eagles 13–7 at home. Lahr intercepted a pass less than two minutes into the game and returned it for a touchdown, putting Cleveland up 7–0. A steady rain fell during the game, resulting in a muddy field and a slippery ball. Both teams had trouble advancing. Remembering Neale's likening the Browns to a basketball team after their first matchup, Brown told his players before the game that they were not to throw a pass as long as they were tied or in the lead. The Browns threw only 2 pass attempts in the game, but they were both called back on penalties. However, on paper, the Browns are credited with not attempting a single pass during the game. They only once made a first down. Cleveland punted often on third down in the first half, opting to give Philadelphia the ball rather than risk a turnover in the inclement weather. Gillom has a total of 12 punts that averaged 42 yards. A fumble by the Eagles set up a 35-yard Groza field goal with less than two minutes left in the half to put Cleveland ahead 10–0. Groza kicked another field goal in the third quarter, boosting his season total to 12 and eclipsing an NFL record for field goals in a season that had stood since 1925. The Eagles scored a touchdown in the final minutes of the game after a 54-yard drive to narrow the final score to 13–7. The win kept Cleveland in a tie for first place with the Giants at 9–2 in the American Conference. No team has since failed to attempt a pass during a game since.

==== Week 13: vs. Washington Redskins ====
Team	1	2	3	4	Total
• **Browns**	0	14	14	17	45
Redskins	7	7	7	0	21

- Date: December 10
- Location: Griffith Stadium
- Game attendance: 30,143
- Source: Pro Football Reference

Scoring summary
1	WAS	Charlie Justice 5-yard pass from Sammy Baugh (Bill Dudley kick)	WAS 7–0
2	CLE	Dub Jones 20-yard pass from Otto Graham (Lou Groza kick)	7–7
2	WAS	Hugh Taylor 51-yard pass from Harry Gilmer (Bill Dudley kick)	WAS 14–0
2	CLE	Dub Jones 29-yard pass from Otto Graham	14–14
3	WAS	Bill Dudley 22-yard rush (Bill Dudley kick)	WAS 21–14
3	CLE	Rex Bumgardner 25-yard pass from Otto Graham (Lou Groza kick)	21–21
3	CLE	Warren Lahr 18-yard interception return (Lou Groza kick)	CLE 28–21
4	CLE	Lou Groza 11-yard field goal	CLE 31–21
4	CLE	Lou Groza 23-yard pass from Otto Graham (Lou Groza kick)	CLE 38–21
4	CLE	Don Phelps 54-yard punt return (Lou Groza kick)	CLE 45–21

Despite Marion Motley being ejected for fighting with Redskin players over racial slurs, the Browns beat the Redskins for the second time in the last game of the season. However, the Giants also defeated the Eagles, leaving them tied at 10–2 atop of the American Conference. The game, played during a heavy snowstorm in Washington, began with a Redskins touchdown on their first drive that was helped by an interference penalty on the Browns. Cleveland tied the game with a touchdown early in the second quarter following a Tommy James interception of the Redskins' Sammy Baugh. Washington quickly regained the lead with a 51-yard passing touchdown to Hugh Taylor, but Graham's 29-yard touchdown pass to Jones, his second of the game, evened the score at halftime. The Redskins went ahead for a third time with a touchdown in the third quarter, but the Browns dominated the remainder of the game, with touchdown receptions by Bumgardner and Phelps and an interception returned for a touchdown by Lahr. Groza scored two field goals in the final quarter to bring the score to 45–21. Despite poor weather and a slippery ball, Graham had four touchdown passes and 321 yards on 23 completions. The Giants also won in the final week of the season, forcing a playoff for the top spot in the conference and a place in the championship game.

== Standings ==
NFL American Conference
	W	L	T	PCT	CONF	PF	PA	STK
Cleveland Browns	10	2	0	.833	8–2	310	144	W6
New York Giants	10	2	0	.833	8–2	268	150	W6
Pittsburgh Steelers	6	6	0	.500	5–5	180	195	W1
Philadelphia Eagles	6	6	0	.500	4–6	254	141	L4
Chicago Cardinals	5	7	0	.417	3–6	233	287	L1
Washington Redskins	3	9	0	.250	1–8	232	326	L1

Note: Tie games were not officially counted in the standings until 1972.

== Postseason ==
The Browns' tie with the Giants in the American Conference standings forced a playoff to determine which of them would advance to the championship game. The Bears and the Los Angeles Rams also tied for first place in the National Conference, forcing a second playoff game in Los Angeles. It was the first time since championship play began that two teams held the same record in both conferences at the end of the season. A coin toss gave Cleveland home-field advantage in the American Conference playoff, which was scheduled for Sunday, December 17 at Cleveland Stadium.

=== Divisional playoff ===
Team	1	2	3	4	Total
Giants	0	0	0	3	3
• Browns	3	0	0	5	8

- Date: December 17
- Location: Cleveland Stadium
- Game attendance: 33,054
- Source: Pro Football Reference

Scoring summary
1	CLE	Lou Groza 11-yard field goal	CLE 3–0
4	NYG	Randy Clay 20-yard field goal	3–3
4	CLE	Lou Groza 28-yard field goal	CLE 6–3
4	CLE	Safety, Charlie Conerly tackled in the end zone by Jim Martin	CLE 8–3

Cleveland faced the Giants on a frozen field at home as a winter wind gusted through the stadium. Cleveland drove deep into New York's territory in the first quarter, but a stop by the Giants led to a Groza field goal that put the Browns up 3–0. The game was a defensive struggle through the middle periods. Neither team scored again until the fourth quarter, when Giants quarterback Charlie Conerly led a drive to the Cleveland 36-yard line. From there, Conerly handed the ball to back Gene "Choo Choo" Roberts, who sprinted outside the right of the line and appeared headed for a touchdown. Cleveland linebacker Bill Willis chased him down and tackled him at the 4-yard line, however. Bob McChesney then caught a pass from Conerly in the end zone for an apparent touchdown on third down, but it was called back on an offside penalty. Cleveland's Tommy James intercepted Conerly's pass on the next play, but the Browns were called for holding, negating the turnover. The Giants got a new set of downs, but were unable to score a touchdown. A penalty sent them back to the 13-yard line, from where Randy Clay kicked a field goal to tie the score. On the Browns' ensuing drive, Brown decided to switch strategies and focus on quarterback keeper plays, calculating that the Giants would be unprepared for runs by Graham. Cleveland advanced to New York's 22-yard line thanks to 45 yards of rushing by Graham, which set up a 28-yard field goal that gave the Browns a 6–3 lead. On the Giants' final possession as time ran out, Martin tackled Conerly in his own end zone, resulting in a safety and making the final score 8–3. The Browns and Giants had only 91 combined passing yards during the game.

=== NFL Championship Game ===
The Rams beat the Bears in the National Conference playoff, setting up a championship matchup with the Browns in Cleveland. The Rams had been based in Cleveland before departing for Los Angeles in 1946, the year the Browns started play, and had won the NFL championship in 1945, when quarterback Bob Waterfield was a rookie. Los Angeles had made it to the NFL championship game in 1949, making its appearance against the Browns its second straight. The Rams had one of the most potent offenses in NFL history in 1950. It featured Waterfield and Norm Van Brocklin at quarterback, Tom Fears and Bob Boyd at end and Elroy Hirsch at halfback. The Rams averaged 309 passing yards per game, a record that stood until 1984. The team's running unit, led by Dick Hoerner, Vitamin Smith and Dan Towler, averaged more than 140 yards a game. Los Angeles averaged 38.8 points per game in 1950, an NFL record that still stood as of 2007.

While the Rams were unmatched offensively, the Browns' defense gave up half as many points during the regular season. Brown announced before the game that he would employ an umbrella defense against the Rams, similar to the one the Giants had used effectively against the Browns. His plan was to show Los Angeles the umbrella formation at first but switch back to the team's usual formation soon after. He abandoned the umbrella defense after the Rams scored a touchdown on their first play.

Team	1	2	3	4	Total
Rams	14	0	14	0	28
• Browns	7	6	7	10	30

- Date: December 24
- Location: Cleveland Stadium
- Game attendance: 29,751
- Source: Pro Football Reference

Scoring summary
1	LAR	Glenn Davis 82-yard pass from Bob Waterfield (Bob Waterfield kick)	LAR 7–0
1	CLE	Dub Jones 27-yard pass from Otto Graham (Lou Groza kick)	7–7
1	LAR	Dick Hoerner 3-yard rush (Bob Waterfield kick)	LAR 14–7
2	CLE	Dante Lavelli 37-yard pass from Otto Graham (kick failed)	LAR 14–13
3	CLE	Dante Lavelli 39-yard pass from Otto Graham (Lou Groza kick)	CLE 20–14
3	LAR	Dick Hoerner 1-yard rush (Bob Waterfield kick)	LAR 21–20
3	LAR	Larry Brink 6-yard fumble return (Bob Waterfield kick)	LAR 28–20
4	CLE	Rex Bumgardner 14-yard pass from Otto Graham (Lou Groza kick)	LAR 28–27
4	CLE	Lou Groza 16-yard field goal	CLE 30–28

The championship game took place on Christmas Eve in Cleveland a week after the conference playoffs. On the Rams' first play after the opening kickoff, Waterfield passed to Glenn Davis for an 82-yard touchdown, giving Los Angeles an early 7–0 lead. Martin was covering Davis, but slipped on the slick turf, leaving the receiver open. Graham and the Browns' offense responded with a drive later in the first quarter that evened the score, but the Rams went ahead again by a touchdown on a three-yard Hoerner rush. Cleveland scored a second touchdown in the second quarter, this time a 37-yard pass from Graham to Lavelli. Groza's extra point attempt failed, however, because of a high snap, putting the Browns behind by one point. Waterfield missed a 15-yard field goal attempt at the end of the first half, leaving the score at 14–13 at halftime.

Cleveland took the lead again in the third quarter on a 39-yard touchdown pass to Lavelli, his second of the day. The Rams responded with a touchdown run by Hoerner and another touchdown quickly thereafter when Motley fumbled and Los Angeles's Larry Brink took it into the end zone. Down 28–20 as the fourth quarter began, Cleveland was helped by interceptions by Thompson and Lahr that put its offense in good field position. On a drive with 10 minutes left to play, Cleveland went for it on fourth down three times and made the necessary yards each time, advancing to the Los Angeles 14-yard line. From there, Graham threw a touchdown pass to Bumgardner, who dove to catch it in the corner of the end zone. After several more defensive stands, the Browns had the ball back and drove toward the Rams' end zone as the game drew to a close. Graham fumbled, however, and the Rams recovered with three minutes left. Cleveland's defense held, and Los Angeles punted, giving the Browns the ball back at their own 31-yard line with 1:49 left in the game. Graham scrambled up the middle for 16 yards on the first play, and then turned to his receivers. A pass to Bumgardner and two to Jones on the sidelines, followed by another to Bumgardner, put the ball at the Los Angeles 11-yard line. Graham ran a quarterback sneak on the next play to place the ball at the middle of the field in preparation for a field goal. After a time out, Groza came in and kicked the field goal with 0:28 left on the clock to put Cleveland ahead 30–28. The Rams fumbled the ensuing kickoff and the Browns recovered, appearing to seal the victory. The officials ruled that Groza had kicked prematurely, however, and Los Angeles returned his rekick to their 46-yard line. An interception by Lahr on a sideline pass stopped the drive and gave Cleveland the win.

== Season leaders ==
Motley led the NFL in rushing yards, with 810. He also had the highest yards-per-carry average among running backs, with 5.8. Gillom's punting average of 43.2 yards was second in the league, just 0.1 yards behind the leader. Groza, meanwhile, set an NFL record for number of field goals made in a season, with 13, and had a .684 average. Motley was chosen by the Associated Press, United Press International and the New York Daily News as a first-team All-Pro. Speedie and Willis also made it on sportswriters' first-team All-Pro lists, while Graham, tackle Lou Rymkus, guard Lin Houston, fullback Tony Adamle and defensive back Tommy James were selected as second-teamers. Motley, Speedie, Willis, Graham, Adamle, Groza and guard Weldon Humble were also selected for the first-ever Pro Bowl, the NFL's all-star game.

The 1950 season began a six-year run in which the Browns reached the NFL championship game, winning two more times in 1954 and 1955. Many of the team's players later remembered 1950 as the pinnacle of their careers, having proven that the team could match up against the best the NFL had to offer. While it was not one of Graham's best seasons statistically, he led the Browns to victory at the end of games against the Giants and Rams to seal victories, and had a 119.0 passer rating. He later called the season "the highlight of my career". Brown believed his undefeated 1948 team was the best he ever coached, but once said the 1950 season was "the most satisfying football experience of my life".
