= Abe Gibron =

American football player and coach (1925–1997)

- Gibron while coach of the Chicago Bears

No. 40, 34, 64, 67
- Position: Guard

Personal information
- Born: September 22, 1925; Michigan City, Indiana, U.S.
- Died: September 23, 1997 (aged 72); Belleair, Florida, U.S.
- Listed height: 5 ft 11 in (1.80 m)
- Listed weight: 243 lb (110 kg)

Career information
- High school: Elston (IN)
- College: Valparaiso (1946); Purdue (1947–1948)
- NFL draft: 1949: 6th round, 55th overall pick

Career history

Playing
- Buffalo Bills (1949); Cleveland Browns (1950–1956); Philadelphia Eagles (1956–1957); Chicago Bears (1958–1959)

Coaching
- Washington Redskins (1960–1964) Offensive line coach; Chicago Bears (1965–1969) Offensive line coach; Chicago Bears (1970–1971) Defensive coordinator/defensive line coach; Chicago Bears (1972–1974) Head coach; Chicago Winds (1975) Head coach; Tampa Bay Buccaneers (1976–1984) Defensive coordinator/defensive line coach

Operations
- Seattle Seahawks (1985–1989) Scout

Awards and highlights
- 3× NFL Champion (1950, 1954, 1955); 2× First-team All-Pro (1953, 1955); 2× Second-team All-Pro (1949, 1952); 4× Pro Bowl (1952–1955); Cleveland Browns Legends; AAFC Rookie Lineman of the Year (1949)

Career NFL/AAFC statistics
- Games played: 125
- Games started: 110
- Fumble recoveries: 3
- Stats at Pro Football Reference

Head coaching record
- Regular season: 11–30–1 (.274)
- Coaching profile at Pro Football Reference

Abraham Gibron (September 22, 1925 – September 23, 1997) was an American professional football player and coach. Gibron played 11 seasons as a guard in the All-America Football Conference (AAFC) and National Football League (NFL) in the 1940s and 1950s, mostly with the Cleveland Browns. He was then hired as an assistant coach for the NFL's Washington Redskins and Chicago Bears before becoming head coach of the Bears between 1972 and 1974.

Gibron grew up in Indiana, where he was a standout athlete in high school. After graduating, he spent two years in the U.S. military during World War II, enrolling at Valparaiso University upon his discharge. He later transferred to Purdue University, where he played football for two years with the Boilermakers and was named an All-Big Ten Conference guard. Gibron's professional career began in 1949 with the Buffalo Bills of the AAFC. The league dissolved after that season, however, and he moved to the Browns in the NFL. While he was initially a substitute, Gibron developed into a strong lineman on Cleveland teams that won NFL championships in 1950, 1954 and 1955 behind an offensive attack that featured quarterback Otto Graham, end Dante Lavelli and tackle Lou Groza. He was named to the Pro Bowl, the NFL's all-star game, each year between 1952 and 1955.

After short stints with the Philadelphia Eagles and the Bears, Gibron ended his playing career and got into coaching. He served first as a line coach for the Redskins for five years, and then in a similar role for the Bears beginning in 1965. He rose to become Bears' defensive coordinator in the early 1970s, and was named head coach in 1972, replacing Jim Dooley. Gibron's three years leading the Bears were unsuccessful, however. His teams posted a combined win–loss–tie record of 11–30–1 over three seasons. Gibron was fired in 1974, and spent the following year as coach of the Chicago Winds, a team in the short-lived World Football League.

Gibron, who was known for his colorful personality and large size – he ballooned to more than 300 pounds as a coach – spent seven seasons as an assistant with the Tampa Bay Buccaneers before retiring from coaching. He stayed close to the game, however, by serving as a scout for the Seattle Seahawks in the late 1980s and as an advisor to the Buccaneers in the early 1990s. He died after suffering a series of strokes in 1997.

== Early life and college ==
Gibron was born in Michigan City, Indiana to Lebanese immigrant parents from Zahlé, and attended Elston High School. Gibron was the captain of his high school football team and was named an All-Northern Indiana Athletic Conference player.

After graduating in 1943, Gibron joined the United States Marine Corps during World War II. Gibron left the military as the war ended in 1945, however, enrolling at Valparaiso University in Valparaiso, Indiana. He played his freshman year of college football there and was captain of the team, which finished the season with a 6–1 win–loss record and won the Indiana Intercollegiate Conference championship under head coach Loren Ellis. Gibron was named an All-Conference guard and was an honorable mention Little College All-American.

Gibron transferred to Purdue University in West Lafayette, Indiana in 1946. He played there between 1946 and 1948, making the varsity team twice. Purdue had a losing record in each of those years, but Gibron was named an All-Big Ten Conference player and an honorable mention All-American.

== Professional career ==
Gibron was selected by the Buffalo Bills in the first round of a secret draft held in 1948 by the All-America Football Conference (AAFC). The AAFC organized the draft for players expected to graduate in 1949 so that its teams could begin wooing their selections before the rival National Football League (NFL) had its draft the following year. The NFL's New York Giants also selected Gibron 55th overall in the sixth round of the 1949 draft, but he chose to play for the Bills instead.

Buffalo posted a 5–5–2 win–loss–tie record in 1949, Gibron's only season with the team. That record made Bills the last-ranked team in a four-team Shaughnessy playoff held at the end of the season. The playoff was instituted after the AAFC's financial struggles led to the consolidation of its divisions that year. The Bills lost in the first round of the playoffs to the Cleveland Browns, and subsequently lost to the Chicago Hornets in a game for third place. The AAFC dissolved after the season, and the Browns, San Francisco 49ers and Baltimore Colts were absorbed into the NFL. Gibron was selected as a second-team All-Pro by sportswriters after the season and was named the AAFC's rookie lineman of the year.

In 1950, players from the AAFC's defunct teams – including the Bills – went into a dispersal draft. Gibron, however, was sold along with halfback Rex Bumgardner and defensive tackle John Kissell to the Browns in a deal that gave Bills owner James Breuil a 25% share in the team. In the Browns, Gibron joined a team that had won all of the AAFC's four championships behind an offense that featured quarterback Otto Graham, fullback Marion Motley and ends Mac Speedie and Dante Lavelli. Yet while the Browns had been the league's best team, many sportswriters and owners doubted that the team would continue its string of success against NFL teams starting in 1950. Cleveland started the season by beating the previous year's NFL champion Philadelphia Eagles and went on to win the NFL championship over the Los Angeles Rams.

Cleveland finished the 1951 season with an 11–1 record and again reached the championship game, but lost this time to the Rams. Gibron was used primarily as a messenger guard early in his career – primarily as a substitute used to send plays in to the quarterback – but later developed into an anchor of Cleveland's offensive line, helping protect Graham and open up space for the team's backs to run. The team again reached the NFL championship game in 1952 and again lost to the Detroit Lions. Gibron, who was unusually quick for his large size, was selected to play in the Pro Bowl, the league all-star game, after the season. He was also named an All-Pro by sportswriters.

Another championship game appearance and loss to the Lions followed in 1953, when Gibron was again named to the Pro Bowl and was selected to one sportswriter's first-team All-Pro list. The Browns came back in 1954 and 1955 to win championships against the Lions and Rams. Gibron was named to the Pro Bowl both of those years and was a first-team All-Pro in 1955. Gibron played part of the 1956 season for the Browns, but he suffered a leg injury and was cut in November to make room on the roster for rookie Don Goss. The Philadelphia Eagles signed him two weeks later to replace Norm Willey, who was out with a broken leg. The Eagles finished with losing records in both 1956 and 1957, Gibron's last year with the team.

Gibron finished his playing career with the Chicago Bears, who signed him in 1958. The Bears had an 8–4 record in both of Gibron's seasons there, but the team did not advance to the NFL championship game. Over his 11-season career, Gibron played in 116 games and started 109 of them, all in his first season in Buffalo.

== Coaching career ==
Shortly after Gibron ended his playing career, Washington Redskins head coach Mike Nixon hired him as his line coach. Washington finished with a 1–9–2 record in 1960 and Nixon was replaced by Bill McPeak, but Gibron stayed in his position under the new coach. Gibron remained in Washington through the 1964 season.

Gibron next returned to Chicago in 1965 to serve as the Bears' offensive line coach as part of a rebuilding project by team owner and head coach George Halas following a losing season in 1964 – only the seventh in franchise history. The Bears finished with a 9–5 record in 1965, but struggled in 1966 and 1967, Halas's final two seasons as the Bears' coach. Gibron was seen as a successful coach, and was courted in 1966 to be head coach of the Miami Dolphins of the American Football League but turned down the offer.

After Halas resigned, Gibron continued as an assistant under new head coach Jim Dooley in 1968. He switched to coaching the defensive line the following year when assistant coach Joe Fortunato resigned and Jim Ringo was hired to coach the offensive line. Dooley, however, was dismissed in late 1971 after three consecutive losing seasons, including a 1–13 record in 1969. Gibron was elevated to head coach the following January and said the team had the talent to make a run at the NFL championship.

It was initially thought that Gibron would make good on his promise to deliver a championship to Chicago; he was regarded as one of the best line coaches in the game. However, he inherited a Bears team in the midst of a generational transition. Running back Gale Sayers, who had anchored Chicago's offense during the mid- to late-1960s, had suffered two knee injuries and was forced to retire during training camp in 1972. Star linebacker Dick Butkus was also hobbled by knee injuries and had to retire nine games into the 1973 season. Quarterback Bobby Douglass ran for 968 yards in 1972, setting an NFL record for quarterbacks, but passed for only 1,246 yards. In his three seasons, the Bears compiled an 11–30–1 record, finishing last in the NFC Central each time. His .268 winning percentage is the worst for a non-interim coach in Bears history. Gibron was fired two days after the final game of the 1974 NFL season. Halas hired Jim Finks as the Bears' general manager in 1974 to formulate a new strategy following the 4–10 record the Bears compiled in Gibron's last season. Chicago had the fourth overall pick in the 1975 NFL draft, using it to select future all-time rushing leader Walter Payton.

Gibron stayed in Chicago in 1975, replacing Babe Parilli as head coach of the World Football League's Chicago Winds. The Winds got out to a 1–4 record before they were expelled from the league in September for falling below league financial requirements, a month before the entire league folded. Gibron was hired in 1976 as a defensive line coach with the expansion Tampa Bay Buccaneers, but was switched to defensive coordinator that March before returning to serve as line coach in later years. He had been a college teammate of Bucs head coach John McKay at Purdue. Gibron stayed in Tampa for seven seasons until McKay retired in early 1985 and was replaced by Leeman Bennett. He then served as a scout for the Seattle Seahawks by head coach Chuck Knox, and was accused later in the year of spying on the Cincinnati Bengals and attempting to steal their signals. Knox responded by saying Gibron's presence at a preseason game in Cincinnati could not have been a secret, given his large size. He stayed on as a scout until 1989, and later worked as an advisor to Bucs coach Sam Wyche.

While he was not successful as a head coach, Gibron was renowned for his colorful personality and immense appetite throughout his career. He weighed about 250 pounds during his playing career, but quickly ballooned to over 300 pounds as a coach. "Every time you went to dinner, it was a banquet", Browns teammate Lou Groza said of him. Buccaneer player Charley Hannah once said after dining with him, "He was eating things we wouldn't even go swimming with in Alabama". A humorous clip of Gibron singing Joy to the World on the sidelines during a 1973 game against Denver was made famous by NFL Films in Football Follies. Gibron played himself in the critically acclaimed 1971 TV movie Brian's Song, the story of Chicago Bears teammates Brian Piccolo and Gale Sayers.

== Later life and death ==
As his coaching career was drawing to a close in 1984, Gibron's teenage son James struck and killed a woman from Largo, Florida while driving drunk. James pleaded no contest to manslaughter charges and was tried as an adult, but the verdict was overturned on appeal. He eventually got 10 years of probation and went on to become a lawyer in Florida.

Gibron was taken to the hospital in 1985 with severe abdominal pains and later had surgery to remove a brain tumor. Gibron suffered strokes in December 1996 and February 1997 that confined him to his home for the remainder of his life. He died at home in Belleair, Florida, the day after his 72nd birthday. Gibron and his wife, Susie, had three children. Gibron was inducted into the Indiana Football Hall of Fame in 1976.

== Head coaching record ==
=== NFL ===
Team	Year	Regular season					Postseason			
Team	Year	Won	Lost	Ties	Win %	Finish	Won	Lost	Win %	Result
CHI	1972	4	9	1	.321		–	–	–	–
CHI	1973	3	11	0	.214		–	–	–	–
CHI	1974	4	10	0	.286		–	–	–	–
CHI total		11	30	1	.274		–	–	–	–
Total		11	30	1	.274		–	–	–	–
