= Chubby Grigg =

American football player (1926–1983)

- Grigg during his Cleveland Browns career

No. 48, 79
- Position: Tackle

Personal information
- Born: January 10, 1926; El Dorado, Arkansas, U.S.
- Died: October 10, 1983 (aged 57); Ore City, Texas, U.S.
- Listed height: 6 ft 2 in (1.88 m)
- Listed weight: 294 lb (133 kg)

Career information
- High school: Longview (Longview, Texas)
- College: Tulsa
- NFL draft: 1946: undrafted

Career history
- Buffalo Bisons (1946); Chicago Rockets (1947); Cleveland Browns (1948–1951); Dallas Texans (1952)

Awards and highlights
- NFL champion (1950); 2× AAFC champion (1948, 1949)

Career NFL statistics
- Games played: 79
- Extra points made: 18
- Stats at Pro Football Reference

Forrest Porter "Chubby" Grigg Jr. (January 10, 1926 – October 10, 1983) was an American professional football tackle who played seven seasons in the All-America Football Conference (AAFC) and National Football League (NFL) in the 1940s and 1950s. Grigg grew up in Texas and attended the University of Tulsa in Oklahoma. After graduating from college, he joined the AAFC's Buffalo Bisons, where he played for a year. Grigg was then sent to the Chicago Rockets in 1947, but stayed only one season before joining the Cleveland Browns in 1948. The Browns won all of their games and the AAFC championship that season. Cleveland again won the AAFC championship in 1949 before the league dissolved and the Browns were absorbed by the more established NFL. Grigg continued to play for the Browns in 1950 and 1951. The team won the NFL championship in 1950, and reached the title game but lost it the following year. Grigg spent a final season with the Dallas Texans before retiring from football.

After football, Grigg owned and ran a successful restaurant in Texas for 18 years, retiring in the early 1970s as his health began to falter. In late 1976, he was arrested after shooting and killing his son Michael, who was taking drugs and had been convicted of burglary the year before. Grigg was tried for the crime in 1977 and found guilty of involuntary manslaughter; he was sentenced to five years of probation. He died in 1983.

== Early life and college ==
Grigg was born in El Dorado, Arkansas and attended Longview High School in Longview, Texas. After graduating, he went to the University of Tulsa, where he was a member of a 1946 team that lost to the Georgia Bulldogs in the 1946 Oil Bowl, 20–6. Grigg recovered a fumble on Georgia's 13-yard line to set up Tulsa's only score of the game.

== Professional career ==
After college, Grigg signed with the Buffalo Bisons of the All-America Football Conference (AAFC). Vying for a spot as a tackle, Grigg weighed in at 330 pounds. He played in the first games of the season for the Bisons in 1946, but was benched in September because of his weight. As a joke at practice, Buffalo coach Red Dawson occasionally told players to "take two laps around Grigg". Grigg attempted to get his weight down to 300 pounds, but was unable to do so. He returned to the lineup for an October game against the Chicago Rockets, and the Bills finished the season with a 3–10 win–loss record. During training camp in 1949, Grigg and teammate Ben Pucci were sold to the Rockets.

Grigg played one year for the Rockets before being traded along with Alex Agase to the Cleveland Browns, a team that had won the first two AAFC championships. Grigg played as a defensive tackle as the Browns won all of their games in 1948 and a third straight league championship. Cleveland won the championship again in 1949, but the AAFC dissolved after the season and the Browns were absorbed by the more established National Football League (NFL). Grigg continued to struggle with his weight while with the Browns. In 1948, head coach Paul Brown gave him a $500 bonus for weighing in at 278 pounds before the season. Grigg, however, ballooned to 317 pounds by the end of the year. The following season, Brown gave him another $500 for coming to camp at 275 pounds and promised him an additional $500 to keep the weight off for the rest of the season.

In 1950, Cleveland's first season in the NFL, the team finished with a 10–2 record and advanced to the championship game against the Los Angeles Rams. The Browns won the game 30–28 on a last-minute field goal by placekicker Lou Groza. Grigg later said blocking for Groza as he made the kick was the highlight of his career. Grigg stayed with the Browns for the 1951 season, when the team again reached the championship game but lost to the Rams. He was acquired by the Green Bay Packers in 1952, but was picked up by the Dallas Texans early in the season on waivers. Grigg played a final season for the Texans before leaving football.

== Later life and death ==
After his playing career ended, Grigg owned and operated a successful restaurant in Ore City, Texas that was well known in Upshur County for its catfish. He sold the business after 18 years in 1972 and retired. By then, he was suffering from diabetes and living off of a disability pension and social security. "I have sugar diabetes and a few other things that go with it", he said then.

Grigg was arrested in November 1976 for shooting and killing his 20-year-old son Michael. Michael had been convicted the previous year of burglary and was serving a five-year probation sentence at the time. Police were called in and found Michael on the family's living room floor with a bullet in his head. Grigg was released on $50,000 bond. The following year, he was indicted and tried for murder. His son had been taking drugs including marijuana and valium, Grigg said, and he felt the boy could not be helped. "I tried everything", he said in 1977. "I thought we'd get him straight, and then he'd start again. He'd get a job, then quit and spend the money on this stuff." The jury in Grigg's murder trial was deadlocked 9 to 3; he changed his plea to guilty of involuntary manslaughter and was sentenced to five years of probation. Michael had changed because of the drugs, Grigg said, quitting his sports activities and losing his ambitions. He was kicked out of high school because his hair was too long. Grigg died in Ore City on October 10, 1983.
