= Dom Moselle =

American gridiron football player (1926–2010)

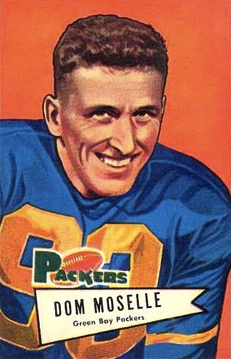
- Moselle on a 1952 football card

No. 92, 93, 47, 24, 88
- Positions: Defensive back, halfback

Personal information
- Born: June 23, 1926; Gile, Wisconsin, U.S.
- Died: August 19, 2010 (aged 84); Superior, Wisconsin, U.S.
- Listed height: 6 ft 0 in (1.83 m)
- Listed weight: 192 lb (87 kg)

Career information
- High school: Hurley (WI)
- College: University of Wisconsin–Superior
- NFL draft: 1950: 23rd round, 299th overall pick

Career history
- Cleveland Browns (1950); Green Bay Packers (1951–1952); Philadelphia Eagles (1954); Calgary Stampeders (1955)

Awards and highlights
- NFL champion (1950); UWS Hall of Fame (1973); Superior Sports Hall of Fame (1996)

Career NFL statistics
- Rushing yards: 176
- Rushing average: 3.8
- Receptions: 31
- Receiving yards: 475
- Total touchdowns: 6
- Interceptions: 4
- Stats at Pro Football Reference

Dominic Angelo Moselle (June 23, 1926 – August 19, 2010) was an American professional football defensive back and halfback who played in the National Football League (NFL) during the early 1950s.

Moselle grew up in Wisconsin and attended University of Wisconsin-Superior (UWS) starting in 1946 after serving two years in the U.S. Army during World War II. Playing as a halfback for the school's football team, he set a number of records, including most rushing yards in a career and most touchdowns in a game, season and career. He was the team's captain and was chosen as an all-conference player. The NFL's Cleveland Browns selected him in the later rounds of the 1950 draft after he was recommended to Cleveland head coach Paul Brown by the coach of one of his opponents in college. The Browns won the NFL championship in 1950, but Moselle was traded the following year to the Green Bay Packers. He played two seasons in Green Bay and one season for the Philadelphia Eagles before playing a final season in the Canadian Football League for the Calgary Stampeders in 1955.

After ending his playing career, Moselle got a master's degree in education and coached at Wabash College for three years. He then moved back to UWS as a teacher and coach, staying at his alma mater until he retired in 1986. He was inducted into the UWS hall of fame in 1973 and into the Superior Sports Hall of Fame in 1996. Moselle died in 2010.

== Early life and college ==
Moselle was born in Gile, Wisconsin and attended Hurley High School, where he played basketball, baseball and football. After graduating in 1943, he joined the U.S. Army and served in Guam and Hawaii during World War II between 1944 and 1945. When the war ended, he enrolled at the University of Wisconsin-Superior, then known as Superior State Teachers College, where he studied health and physical education. Playing as a halfback on the school's Yellowjackets football team between 1946 and 1949, Moselle set school records for rushing yards in a career, with 2,652 on 491 carries. He also set a single-season school rushing record in 1948 with 962 yards. He still holds the record for most touchdowns in a game, season and career, as well as for kickoff returns for touchdowns. He was the football team's captain, and was named an all-Wisconsin Intercollegiate Athletic Conference player in football and basketball.

== Professional career ==
Moselle was selected 299th overall by the Cleveland Browns of the National Football League (NFL) in the 23rd round of the 1950 draft after he was recommended to head coach Paul Brown by one of his opposing college coaches. He was the first player from the Wisconsin State University system to be drafted into the NFL. In the Browns, Moselle joined a team transitioning into the NFL after four years and four championship victories in the All-America Football Conference. Led by quarterback Otto Graham, fullback Marion Motley and ends Dante Lavelli and Mac Speedie, the Browns finished the season with a 10–2 win–loss record and won the NFL championship over the Los Angeles Rams. Moselle returned kicks and served as a backup halfback for the Browns, rushing for 39 yards. He also played as a defensive back.

Brown traded Moselle to the Green Bay Packers in 1951 along with linebacker Walt Michaels and several other players in exchange for the rights to tackle Bob Gain. Moselle played the following two seasons for Green Bay, but the team finished no better than fourth place in the NFL's National division. After a season away from the NFL, he played with the Philadelphia Eagles in 1954. The Calgary Stampeders of the Canadian Football League bought Moselle from the Eagles in 1955, and he played there for one season.

== Later life and death ==
Moselle earned a master's degree in education from Indiana State University after his playing career, and then spent three years teaching and coaching football and basketball at Wabash College in Crawfordsville, Indiana. He resigned in 1961 to take a job at the University of Wisconsin-Superior, his alma mater. He taught physical education there and coached the school's football, baseball, basketball and track teams. Moselle resigned as the basketball coach in 1970 to devote more of his time to teaching. He retired in 1986.

Moselle was inducted into the University of Wisconsin-Superior hall of fame in 1973 and the Superior Sports Hall of Fame in 1996. He and his wife, Patricia O'Keefe, had three children. He died in 2010.
