= Tim Temerario =

American football player (1906–2001)

- Temerario while at Indiana University in 1937

Profile
- Position: Coach

Personal information
- Born: February 18, 1906; Lorain, Ohio, U.S.
- Died: July 7, 2001 (aged 95)

Career information
- High school: New Brighton (PA)
- College: Geneva College

Career history
- East Liverpool High School (1932–1934); Indiana, Line (1935–1937); Denison, Line (1938–1940); Indiana, Ends (1941); Indiana, Asst. (1945–1947); Detroit Lions, Line (1948–1949); Cleveland Browns, Ends (1950–1951); NC State, Ends (1952–1953); Penn, Line (1954–1959); Washington Redskins, Asst. (1960–1965)

Awards and highlights
- Geneva College MVP (1931); National Football League Champion (1950); Ivy League Champion (1959); Lorain Sports Hall of Fame (1973); Beaver County Sports Hall of Fame (1980)

Carmel Arthur "Tim" Temerario (February 18, 1906 – July 7, 2001) was a high school, college and professional American football coach and executive. He was an assistant coach for the Detroit Lions, Cleveland Browns and Washington Redskins, and served as the Redskins' director of player personnel between 1965 and 1978.

Temerario grew up in Lorain, Ohio, but moved to Pennsylvania with his family during high school. He attended Geneva College in Beaver Falls, Pennsylvania and played a variety of positions on the school's football team. He was named the most valuable player in 1931, when the team went undefeated.

After graduating, Temerario began a coaching career, first at East Liverpool High School in Ohio and then as an assistant at Denison University and Indiana University in the 1930s and 1940s. His career was interrupted by service in the U.S. Navy during World War II. He returned to Indiana in 1945 as an assistant to Bo McMillin as the team won the Big Ten Conference championship. When McMillin became head coach of the Lions in 1948, Temerario moved with him. He worked there for two years before being hired as an assistant for the Browns in 1950. The Browns won the NFL championship that year.

Temerario spent two seasons with the Browns before becoming an assistant at North Carolina State University and the University of Pennsylvania. The Redskins hired him as an assistant in 1960, a position he retained through 1965. He then became the team's director of player personnel, staying in that role until his retirement in 1978. He was inducted into the Lorain Sports Hall of Fame in 1973 and the Beaver County Sports Hall of Fame in 1980.

== Early life and college ==
Temerario was born in Lorain, Ohio and attended Lorain High School. His father was a construction worker who traveled frequently, and Temerario later enrolled at two other high schools. He spent his junior and senior years at New Brighton High School in Pennsylvania, where he played as a center on the football team. He graduated in 1927.

Temerario enrolled at Geneva College in Beaver Falls, Pennsylvania and played football there under head coaches Bo McMillin, Mack Flenniken and Howard Harpster. He played center, quarterback, end, guard and linebacker. Temerario was voted the most valuable player of a 1931 team that went undefeated under Harpster. He graduated later that year.

== Coaching career ==
After college, Temerario began a football coaching career at East Liverpool High School in East Liverpool, Ohio. He then worked for three years as the line coach for the freshman team at Indiana University before being hired as the varsity line coach at Ohio's Denison University in 1938. He remained at Denison until returning to Indiana as the varsity team's ends coach in 1941. The team finished with a 2–6 win–loss record that year.

Temerario left Indiana later in 1941 to serve in the U.S. Navy as American involvement in World War II intensified. He was initially placed in a physical education program run by Navy coach Tom Hamilton, but later requested a transfer to active duty. He served as a beachmaster during the Philippines Campaign and at Utah Beach during the Normandy landings in 1944. He rose to the rank of lieutenant commander and was in the military until the war ended in 1945.

Temerario returned to Indiana in 1945 and was an assistant under Bo McMillin, his first coach when he played at Geneva. The Indiana Hoosiers football team finished with a 9–0–1 record that year and won the Big Ten Conference championship. Indiana was ranked fourth in the AP Poll of the best college teams in the nation.

Temerario rose to become McMillin's top assistant at Indiana, and earned a master's degree in physical education while he was there. When McMillin left to become head coach of the Detroit Lions of the National Football League in 1948, Temerario went with him. He was an assistant for the Lions in the 1948 and 1949 seasons, both of which ended with losing records.

Paul Brown, the head coach and general manager of the NFL's Cleveland Browns, appointed Temerario the team's ends coach and chief scout in April 1950. He replaced Dick Gallagher, who had left to become the head football coach at Santa Clara University. Led by quarterback Otto Graham and ends Dante Lavelli and Mac Speedie, the Browns finished with a 10–2 regular-season record and won the NFL championship in Temerario's first year. He continued in Cleveland through the 1951 season, when the Browns again reached the NFL championship but lost to the Los Angeles Rams.

Temerario left the Browns in 1952 because of an unspecified "disagreement" with the team. Two months later, he became the ends coach at North Carolina State University. Pennsylvania State University hired him as its line coach in early 1954. Penn won the Ivy League championship in 1959 after finishing the season with a 9–2 record.

Temerario joined the Washington Redskins as an assistant coach in 1960, overseeing the ends and the defense at different stages through 1965. He became the Redskins' head of pro player personnel in 1966 and served in that position for 13 years until his retirement in 1978. In 1975, he considered bringing in professional wrestler André the Giant for a tryout in training camp. Temerario called and then canceled a press conference with the 7-foot-four-inch wrestler, which led to speculation that he had been signed. Temerario, however, said he had only pondered the possibility and that André the Giant's salary requirements made the move impossible. He was then making about $200,000 a year ($1,196,660 in 2025 dollars). The Redskins never had a winning season while Temerario was an assistant coach, although the team advanced to the playoffs five times during his career as an executive. The team reached Super Bowl VII in 1972, but lost to the Miami Dolphins.

== Later life and death ==
Temerario stayed in the Washington, D.C. area after retiring. He was inducted into the Lorain Sports Hall of Fame in 1973 and into the Beaver County, Pennsylvania sports hall of fame in 1980. He died of heart failure in 2001 and was interred at Arlington National Cemetery, in Arlington, Virginia. He and his wife Charlotte had one son.
