= Ken Gorgal =

American football player (1929–2016)

No. 85, 15, 14, 26
- Positions: Safety, quarterback

Personal information
- Born: February 13, 1929; Peru, Illinois, U.S.
- Died: May 8, 2016 (aged 87); Vero Beach, Florida, U.S.
- Listed height: 6 ft 2 in (1.88 m)
- Listed weight: 200 lb (91 kg)

Career information
- High school: St. Bede Academy (Peru)
- College: Purdue (1946–1949)
- NFL draft: 1950: 6th round, 78th overall pick

Career history
- Cleveland Browns (1950, 1953–1954); Chicago Bears (1955–1956); Green Bay Packers (1956)

Awards and highlights
- 2× NFL champion (1950, 1954); First-team All-Pro (1953)

Career NFL statistics
- Interceptions: 19
- Fumble recoveries: 5
- Stats at Pro Football Reference

Kenneth Robert Gorgal (February 13, 1929 – May 8, 2016) was an American professional football player who was a safety in the National Football League (NFL) for the Cleveland Browns, Chicago Bears, and Green Bay Packers between 1950 and 1956. Gorgal grew up in Illinois, where he was a standout athlete in high school. He then played college football at Purdue University, playing as a quarterback and punt returner under head coach Stu Holcomb. In 1948, Gorgal set a school record that stood for more than 50 years by amassing 138 return yards in a single game.

The Browns selected Gorgal in the 1950 NFL draft. He had six interceptions that season as Cleveland finished with a 10–2 record and beat the Los Angeles Rams to win the NFL championship. He then left the team for a two-year stint in the U.S. Army during the Korean War, returning in 1953. Gorgal was on a Browns squad that won another NFL championship in 1954, but head coach Paul Brown traded him to the Bears after the season. He played in Chicago in 1955, but a conflict with owner and coach George Halas led to his release halfway through the following season. The Packers claimed him on waivers and he played out the year in Green Bay. Gorgal then left football and settled in suburban Chicago, where he sold insurance.

== Early life and college ==
Ken Gorgal was born and raised in Peru, Illinois, and attended the town's St. Bede Academy, a private Catholic high school. His father, Alex Gorgal, had played professional football in the 1920s as a wingback for the Rock Island Independents, an early NFL team. Gorgal was also a strong athlete, lettering in track and field, baseball and football at St. Bede. He played as a quarterback and defensive back on the football team.

After graduating from St. Bede, Gorgal enrolled at Purdue University in West Lafayette, Indiana in 1946. He played quarterback, defensive back and returned punts for the school's football team. Gorgal set a Purdue Boilermakers football record in 1948 by amassing 138 return yards in a game against Pittsburgh. The mark stood for more than 50 years until it was broken by Vinny Sutherland in 1999. Purdue, however, finished the season with a 3–6 record under head coach Stu Holcomb. Gorgal accounted for most of Purdue's passing the following year in an upset victory against Minnesota, prompting Holcomb to say he had "a perfect game in directing the team on the field". Purdue, however, again finished the season with a losing record. Gorgal was also a center fielder on the Purdue baseball team.

== Professional career ==
Gorgal was selected 78th overall by the Cleveland Browns of the NFL in the sixth round of the 1950 draft. The Browns were set to begin their first season in the NFL after transferring from the All-America Football Conference (AAFC), which had disbanded the previous year. The team had won each of the AAFC's championships in its four years of existence. Gorgal was given a $5,900-a-year contract with a $200 bonus and made Cleveland's roster as a starter in his rookie year, supplanting long-time safety Cliff Lewis. Gorgal was large in stature for a safety of the era; he was six feet, two inches tall and weighed about 200 pounds. He had six interceptions in 1950, second on the team to Tommy James's nine. Led by an offense that featured quarterback Otto Graham, fullback Marion Motley and ends Dante Lavelli and Mac Speedie, the Browns finished with a 10–2 record and won the NFL championship by beating the Los Angeles Rams.

Gorgal left the Browns after the season to serve in the U.S. Army during the Korean War. He was stationed back home in Peru and ran background checks for the Army's Counterintelligence Corps. Gorgal was discharged and returned to the Browns in 1953, helping bolster a defensive backfield that had been depleted by players' military service and Lewis's retirement. The Browns again advanced to the NFL championship game in 1953, but lost to the Detroit Lions. Gorgal had four interceptions during the regular season and two in the title game. Sportswriters named him a first-team All-Pro after the season.

Cleveland continued to succeed in 1954, winning the NFL East division with a 9–3 record and beating Detroit for the NFL championship. Gorgal was injured and missed the latter half of the season; he had just one interception, although he returned it 53 yards for the only touchdown of his career. Cleveland head coach Paul Brown considered Gorgal one of his nicest players – he was known as "Gurgles Gorgal," the coach once said, because he "added so much fellowship and good feeling to our team."

In July 1955, Gorgal was traded along with defensive end Doug Atkins to the Chicago Bears for draft picks. Gorgal later criticized the trade, saying Brown dumped him because of his injury. Gorgal, who grew up rooting for the Bears, had six interceptions in 1955, when the team finished second in the NFL West division. He came into conflict with Bears coach and owner George Halas over his role as a leader on the team, however, and he was released on waivers halfway through the 1956 season. The rival Green Bay Packers claimed him in November and he played the rest of the season with them, finishing the year with two interceptions in five games. However, he sat out the Bears–Packers rivalry game the weekend he was picked up, stating he had "too many good friends on the Bears" to play against them. Gorgal considered Green Bay a lower-tier team and remained frustrated with his acrimonious departure from Chicago; he decided to quit football rather than play another year with the Packers.

== Later life ==
Gorgal and his wife, Irene, had bought a house in the Chicago suburbs during his time with the Bears. After retiring from football, Gorgal went back to Chicago, living there with his wife and four children, and became an insurance salesman. He later held a seat on the Chicago Board of Trade, a major futures exchange. His son Mark played middle guard for Purdue in the 1970s. He died on May 8, 2016, at the age of 87.
