= Alex Gorgal =

Polish American football wingback (1900–1986)

No. 11
- Position: Wingback

Personal information
- Born: January 16, 1900; Poland
- Died: June 1, 1986 (aged 86); Peru, Illinois, United States
- Listed height: 5 ft 9 in (1.75 m)
- Listed weight: 180 lb (82 kg)

Career history
- Rock Island Independents (1923)
- Stats at Pro Football Reference

Alexander Frank Gorgal (January 16, 1900 – June 1, 1986) was an American football player who played as a wingback for the Rock Island Independents of the National Football League (NFL). He was the father of Ken Gorgal. In the 1940s he was a policeman in Peru, Illinois.
