= Rex Bumgardner =

American football player (1923–1998)

- Bumgardner being tackled by Emlen Tunnell of the New York Giants in a 1950 playoff game

No. 90, 22
- Position: Halfback

Personal information
- Born: September 6, 1923; Clarksburg, West Virginia, U.S.
- Died: June 1, 1998 (aged 74); Clarksburg, West Virginia, U.S.
- Listed height: 5 ft 11 in (1.80 m)
- Listed weight: 193 lb (88 kg)

Career information
- High school: Victory (WV)
- College: West Virginia University

Career history
- Buffalo Bills (1948–1949); Cleveland Browns (1950–1952)

Awards and highlights
- NFL champion (1950)

Career statistics
- Rushing attempts: 236
- Rushing yards: 868
- Touchdowns: 10
- Stats at Pro Football Reference

Rex Keith Bumgardner (September 6, 1923 – June 1, 1998) was a halfback in the All-America Football Conference (AAFC) and National Football League (NFL) for the Buffalo Bills and the Cleveland Browns in the late 1940s and early 1950s.

Bumgardner grew up in West Virginia and helped lead his high school basketball team to a state championship in 1941. He attended West Virginia University following a stint in the military during World War II, playing on the school's football team in 1946 and 1947. He then started his professional career with the Bills of the AAFC, where he remained for two seasons before joining the Browns in 1950. Cleveland won the NFL championship game that year, aided by a diving touchdown catch by Bumgardner late in the fourth quarter.

Bumgardner stayed with the Browns until 1953, when the team sold him to the Baltimore Colts. He retired after the Colts cut him and went back to West Virginia, where he worked as a sheriff and U.S. marshal for several decades. He died in 1998.

== Early life and college ==
Bumgardner grew up in Clarksburg, West Virginia and attended the local Victory High School. He played on a basketball team at Victory that won the state scholastic championship in 1941 under head coach Howard "Doc" Hutson. After graduating, Bumgardner served in the United States Army Air Forces during World War II and was stationed at Luke Air Force Base in Arizona, where he played for the base's service football team. After the war, he enrolled at West Virginia University and played on the football team as a halfback in 1946 and 1947. He was a substitute in 1946, but led the team in rushing in 1947. West Virginia had a 6–4 win–loss record in 1947 under coach Bill Kern.

== Professional career ==
Bumgardner was signed by the Buffalo Bills of the All-America Football Conference (AAFC) before the 1948 season. The team finished with a 7–7 record and advanced to the AAFC championship that year, but lost to the Cleveland Browns. The AAFC dissolved after the 1949 season, and Bumgardner joined the Browns, who had merged into the National Football League (NFL). When the Bills went out of existence, Browns head coach Paul Brown obtained Bumgardner along with guard Abe Gibron and defensive tackle John Kissell in a deal with former Bills owner James Breuil.

Led by an offense that featured quarterback Otto Graham, fullback Marion Motley and ends Mac Speedie and Dante Lavelli, Cleveland finished the 1950 season with a 10–2 record and won the NFL's American division. That set up a matchup with the Los Angeles Rams in the championship game. The score was close for most of the game, but the Browns fell behind 28–20 in the fourth quarter. Graham then led a long drive that ended with a 14-yard touchdown pass to Bumgardner, who made a diving catch in the end zone to bring the score to 28–27. Browns placekicker Lou Groza made a field goal with 28 seconds left in the game to give Cleveland the victory.

Bumgardner stayed with the Browns for the 1951 and 1952 seasons, both of which ended with losses in the NFL championship game. Cleveland sold him in a cash-only transaction to the Baltimore Colts in 1953. The Colts, however, cut him in September before the season began. Bumgardner then decided to retire.

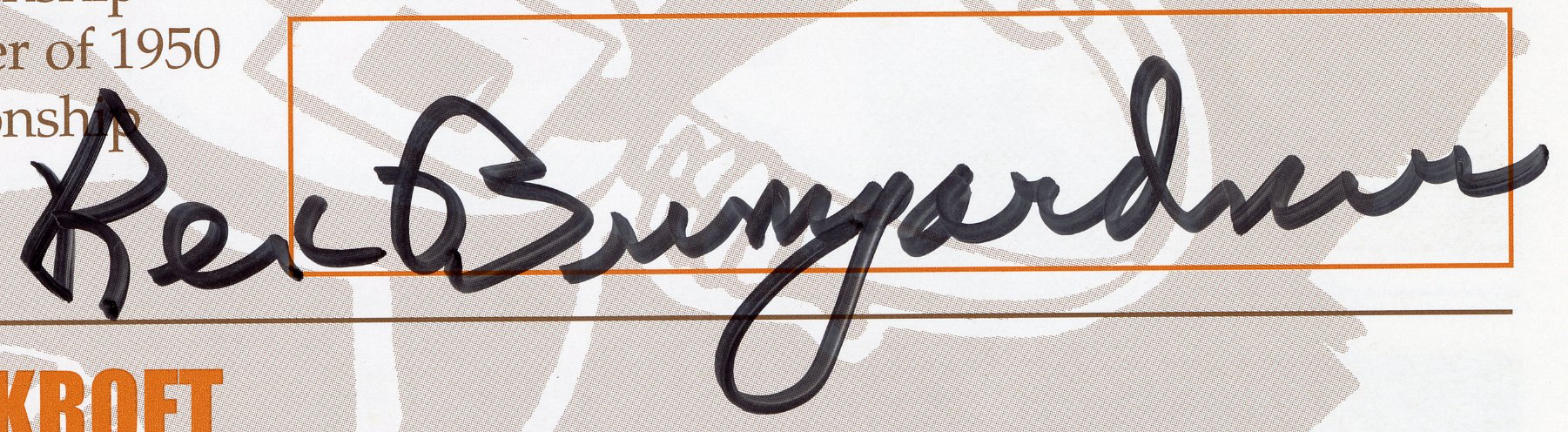

== Later life and death ==
Bumgardner moved back to West Virginia after his football career and started a job as the deputy sheriff to his mother, who was the sheriff in the Clarksburg area. He later was hired as the treasurer and sheriff of Marion County, West Virginia before becoming a U.S. marshal overseeing 32 counties in the northern part of the state in 1965. He served as a marshal until resigning in 1976 to run for Harrison County sheriff.

Bumgardner died in 1998. He had two sons with his first wife and two more sons with his second wife, Judy.
