= Don Phelps =

American football player (1924–1982)

- Phelps at Kentucky in 1948

No. 21, 94, 44
- Positions: Halfback, defensive back

Personal information
- Born: January 7, 1924; Richmond, Kentucky, U.S.
- Died: June 11, 1982 (aged 58); Frankfort, Kentucky, U.S.
- Listed height: 5 ft 11 in (1.80 m)
- Listed weight: 185 lb (84 kg)

Career information
- High school: Danville (KY)
- College: Kentucky
- NFL draft: 1950: 5th round, 65th overall pick

Career history
- Cleveland Browns (1950–1952)

Awards and highlights
- NFL champion (1950); Second-team All-SEC (1946)

Career NFL statistics
- Rushing yards: 263
- Rushing average: 4.8
- Interceptions: 1
- Total touchdowns: 4
- Stats at Pro Football Reference

Don Cooper "Dopey" Phelps (January 7, 1924 – June 11, 1982) was an American professional football halfback and defensive back who played for the Cleveland Browns in the National Football League (NFL) in the early 1950s.

Phelps was born in Kentucky and played football at his local high school. After serving in the U.S. Army during World War II, he attended the University of Kentucky and continued to play football under head coach Bear Bryant starting in 1946. He led the nation that year in kickoff and punt returns and set a Kentucky single-season return yardage record. Phelps was suspended for most of the 1948 season for breaking team rules, but he returned in 1949, when Kentucky played in the Orange Bowl.

The Browns selected Phelps in the fifth round of the NFL draft. Cleveland won the NFL championship in 1950, when Phelps served mainly as a punt and kickoff return man. The Browns reached the championship game in the following two seasons but lost to the Los Angeles Rams and Detroit Lions. Phelps retired before the 1953 season. He worked for the state of Kentucky after leaving football.

== Early life and college ==
Phelps grew up in Danville, Kentucky, and played football at Danville High School, where he got the nickname "Dopey" from a comic strip character. After a stint in the U.S. Army during World War II, he came home and enrolled at the University of Kentucky. Playing football under head coach Bear Bryant, he led the nation in kickoff and punt return yards as a freshman in 1946. Phelps was often in trouble with Bryant for team rule violations, and was suspended for most of 1948, his junior season. Kentucky finished the 1949 season with a 9–3 win–loss record and lost to Santa Clara University in the Orange Bowl.

== Professional career ==
After graduating from Kentucky in 1949, Phelps was selected 65th overall by the Cleveland Browns of the National Football League (NFL) in the sixth round of the 1950 draft. The Browns had recently joined the NFL after four years and four championships in the defunct All-America Football Conference. Led by quarterback Otto Graham and fullback Marion Motley, the Browns finished the 1950 season with a 10–2 record and won the NFL championship over the Los Angeles Rams. Phelps was used primarily on kickoffs and punts, registering 499 total return yards and one punt return for a touchdown in 1950. He also had 198 rushing yards and a rushing touchdown.

Cleveland reached the NFL championship game in each of the following two seasons, but lost to the Rams in 1951 and the Detroit Lions in 1952. Phelps's production declined in his second year to 65 rushing yards and 69 return yards. He had just five punt returns in 1952, his final season with the Browns.

== Later life and death ==
After retiring from football in 1953, Phelps worked for the state of Kentucky. When he died in 1982, he still held Kentucky's single-season kickoff return record, with a 45-yard average in 1946.
