= 1952 All-Pro Team =

Official list of the best NFL players in 1952

The 1952 All-Pro Team consisted of American football players chosen by various selectors for the All-Pro team of the National Football League (NFL) for the 1952 NFL season. Teams were selected by, among others, the Associated Press (AP), the United Press (UP), and the New York Daily News.

== Selections ==
Offensive selections
| Position | Player | Team | Selector(s) |
|---|---|---|---|
| Quarterback | Bobby Layne | Detroit Lions | AP-1 |
| Quarterback | Otto Graham | Cleveland Browns | AP-2, UP-1, NYDN-1 |
| Halfback | Hugh McElhenny | San Francisco 49ers | AP-1, UP-1, NYDN-1 |
| Halfback | Dan Towler | Los Angeles Rams | AP-1, UP-1 |
| Halfback | Robert Hoernschemeyer | Detroit Lions | NYDN-1 |
| Fullback | Eddie Price | New York Giants | AP-1, UP-1, NYDN-1 |
| End | Gordy Soltau | San Francisco 49ers | AP-1, UP-1, NYDN-1 |
| End | Cloyce Box | Detroit Lions | AP-1 |
| End | Mac Speedie | Cleveland Browns | UP-1 |
| End | Billy Howton | Green Bay Packers | NYDN-1 |
| Tackle | Leo Nomellini | San Francisco 49ers | AP-1, UP-1, NYDN-1 |
| Tackle | George Connor | Chicago Bears | AP-1, UP-1 [linebacker], NYDN-1 |
| Guard | Lou Creekmur | Detroit Lions | AP-1, UP-1, NYDN-1 |
| Guard | Lou Groza | Cleveland Browns | AP-1, UP-1 [tackle], NYDN-1 |
| Guard | Bill Fischer | Chicago Cardinals | UP-1 |
| Guard | Bruno Banducci | San Francisco 49ers | NYDN-1 |
| Center | Frank Gatski | Cleveland Browns | AP-1, NYDN-1 |
| Center | Bill Walsh | Pittsburgh Steelers | UP-1 |

Defensive selections
| Position | Player | Team | Selector(s) |
|---|---|---|---|
| Defensive end | Len Ford | Cleveland Browns | AP-1, UP-1, NYDN-1 |
| Defensive end | Pete Pihos | Philadelphia Eagles | AP-1, NYDN-1 |
| Defensive end | Larry Brink | Los Angeles Rams | UP-1 |
| Defensive tackle | Arnie Weinmeister | New York Giants | AP-1, UP-1, NYDN-1 |
| Defensive tackle | Thurman "Fum" McGraw | Detroit Lions | AP-1, UP-1, NYDN-1 |
| Defensive guard | Stan West | Los Angeles Rams | AP-1, UP-1, NYDN-1 |
| Defensive guard | Bill Willis | Cleveland Browns | AP-1, NYDN-1 |
| Defensive guard | Les Bingaman | Detroit Lions | UP-1 |
| Linebacker | Chuck Bednarik | Philadelphia Eagles | AP-1, UP-1 |
| Linebacker | Jerry Shipkey | Pittsburgh Steelers | AP-1, NYDN-1 |
| Defensive back | Jack Christiansen | Detroit Lions | AP-1 |
| Defensive back | Ollie Matson | Chicago Cardinals | AP-1 |
| Defensive halfback | Bob Smith | Detroit Lions | UP-1, NYDN-1 |
| Defensive halfback | Herb Rich | Los Angeles Rams | UP-1, NYDN-1 |
| Defensive halfback | Johnny Williams | Washington Redskins | NYDN-1 |
| Safety | Emlen Tunnell | New York Giants | AP-1, UP-1 |
