= Larry Brink =

American football player (1923–2016)

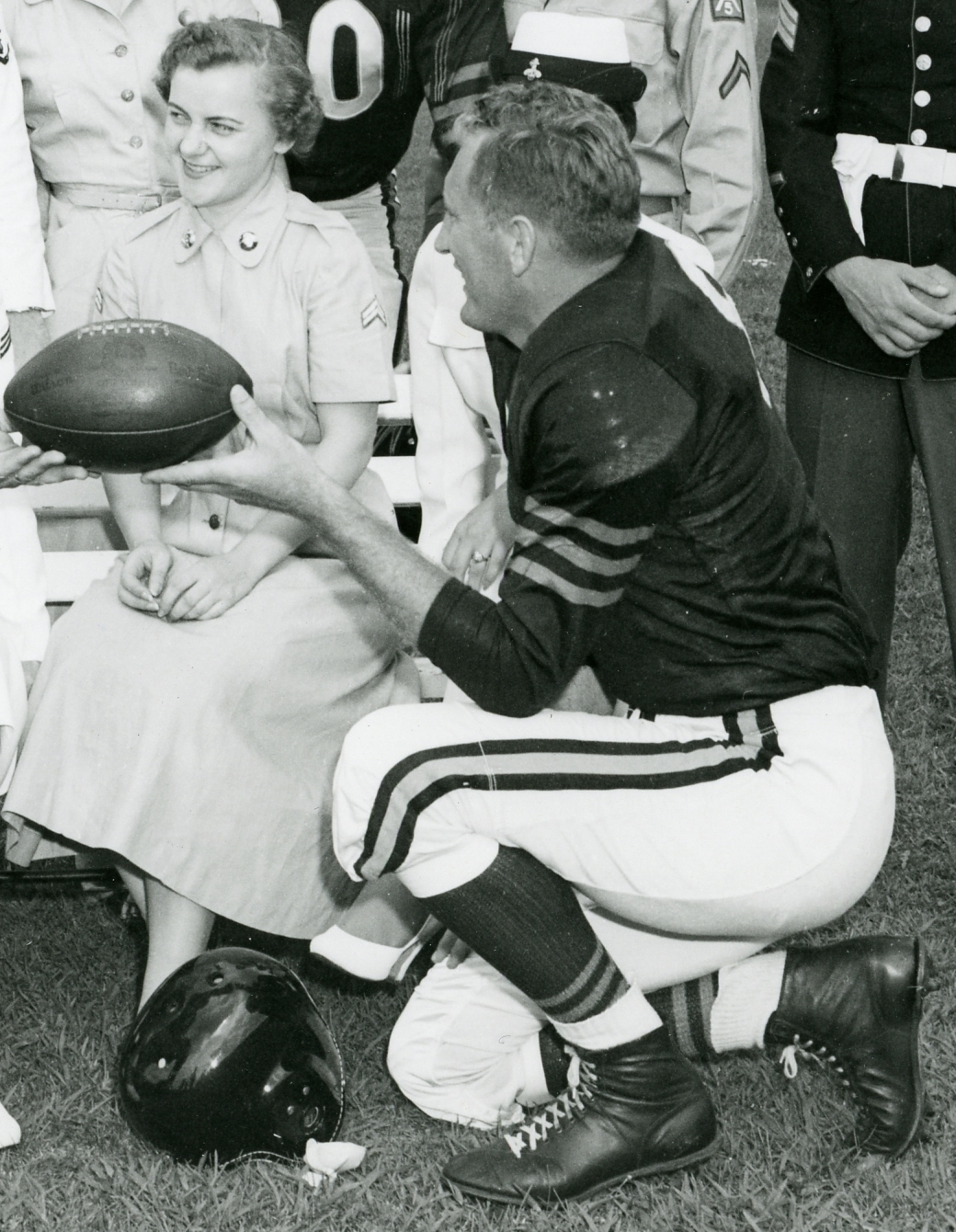
- Brink (right) with the Chicago Bears in 1954

No. 63, 83, 81
- Positions: Defensive end, end

Personal information
- Born: September 12, 1923; Milaca, Minnesota, U.S.
- Died: August 7, 2016 (aged 92); Redding, California, U.S.
- Listed height: 6 ft 5 in (1.96 m)
- Listed weight: 236 lb (107 kg)

Career information
- College: Northern Illinois State (1945–1947)
- NFL draft: 1948: 17th round, 150th overall pick

Career history
- Los Angeles Rams (1948–1953); Chicago Bears (1954)

Awards and highlights
- NFL champion (1951); 3× Second-team All-Pro (1951, 1952, 1953); 2× Pro Bowl (1950, 1951)

Career NFL statistics
- Receptions: 4
- Receiving yards: 36
- Fumble recoveries: 8
- Total touchdowns: 1
- Stats at Pro Football Reference

Lawrence Raymond Brink (September 12, 1923 – August 7, 2016) was an American professional football player who was a defensive end for seven seasons in the National Football League (NFL). He played college football for the Northern Illinois Huskies.

== Early life and education ==
Brink was born in Milaca, Minnesota, on September 12, 1923, to Garrett and Anna (Ruis) Brink. He attended Foley High School in Foley, Minnesota. After military service in World War II, Brink went to Northern Illinois University, where he played college football for the Huskies from 1945 to 1947. He played with three other future NFL players on the 1946 team that won the Illinois Intercollegiate Athletic Conference championship with an 8–2 record. The team went on to the Turkey Bowl, losing to Evanston in the Huskies' first post-season game. He graduated in 1948 with a B.S. in education. In 1978, he was one of the charter inductees of the NIU Athletics Hall of Fame. He died on August 7, 2016, in Redding, California.
