= Cliff Lewis (quarterback) =

American football player (1923–2002)

- Lewis in 1946

No. 62, 61
- Positions: Quarterback, defensive back

Personal information
- Born: March 22, 1923; Cleveland, Ohio, U.S.
- Died: July 25, 2002 (aged 79); Tampa, Florida, U.S.
- Listed height: 5 ft 11 in (1.80 m)
- Listed weight: 168 lb (76 kg)

Career information
- High school: Lakewood; Staunton Military Academy
- College: Duke (1943–1944)
- NFL draft: 1946: 21st round, 200th overall pick

Career history
- Cleveland Browns (1946–1951)

Awards and highlights
- 4× AAFC champion (1946–1949); NFL champion (1950); Greater Cleveland Sports Hall of Fame (1976)

Career NFL/AAFC statistics
- Passing attempts: 69
- Passing completions: 30
- Completion percentage: 43.5%
- TD–INT: 7–5
- Passing yards: 514
- Passer rating: 73
- Interceptions: 30
- Stats at Pro Football Reference

Clifford Allen Lewis (March 22, 1923 – July 25, 2002) was an American professional football player for the Cleveland Browns of the All-America Football Conference (AAFC) and National Football League (NFL). He was the team's first quarterback.

Lewis attended Lakewood High School in Lakewood, Ohio, and Staunton Military Academy in Virginia. He went to Duke University, where he played football as a back. He was a member of the Duke Blue Devils basketball team during the 1944–45 season. Lewis joined the Browns after graduating from college and spent his entire professional career with the team, playing primarily as a defensive back. He left the game after the 1951 season to concentrate on his insurance business. Lewis died in 2002.

== Early life and college ==
Lewis grew up in Lakewood, Ohio and attended Lakewood High School. He played football and baseball, and was on a Lakewood basketball team that reached the state high school championship game in 1941. Lakewood's football team tied for the Lake Erie League championship in 1940 and 1941, when Lewis played left halfback. Lewis later transferred to Staunton Military Academy in Virginia, and in 1942 set a school scoring record in football with 14 touchdowns and 282 total points.

After graduating, Lewis attended Duke University in Durham, North Carolina, and played as a back on the school's Blue Devils football team. Lewis was Duke's second-string tailback as a sophomore in 1944, but he took over starting duties after the original first-stringer, Allen Elger, suffered a knee injury. Lewis, however, broke his elbow in the team's second game of the season against the University of Pennsylvania and had to sit out. He returned for a November game against the Georgia Tech Yellow Jackets, and in a 34–0 victory on November 11 against the previously undefeated Wake Forest University he passed to receiver Clark Jones for a touchdown. Later in November, he passed to Harold Raether for the final touchdown in a 33–0 win over the University of North Carolina that gave Duke a second consecutive Southern Conference title and a spot in the Sugar Bowl game against the University of Alabama. Lewis's passing helped Duke drive the ball 64 yards in the third quarter against Alabama, leading to a touchdown by All-American Tom Davis. Duke won 29–26. While football was Lewis's main sport, he also played basketball at Duke in the 1944–45 season.

== Professional career ==
Lewis entered the United States Navy in 1945 and was a triple threat player and alternate quarterback for the Fleet City Bluejackets, a military team. The Bluejackets won the national service title that year.

The Los Angeles Rams of the National Football League (NFL) selected Lewis in the 21st round with the 200th pick in the 1946 NFL draft. NFL commissioner Bert Bell ruled him ineligible under league rules. The Rams took Lewis thinking he was in the 1946 graduating class, but he had one more year of eligibility left as an athlete who entered college in 1943. The decision delayed Lewis's professional career for a year; in 1946 he signed with the Cleveland Browns of the new All-America Football Conference (AAFC). Lewis started at quarterback for the Browns in their first three games in his first season, sharing duties with Otto Graham. After Graham took over as the starting quarterback, he became a defensive back who also returned punts and kickoffs. Lewis had five interceptions in his first season, when the Browns won the AAFC championship. Cleveland won the league championship in each of the ensuing three years before the AAFC dissolved and the Browns were absorbed into the more established NFL.

The Browns beat the Rams to win the NFL championship in 1950, the team's first year in the league. The following year, Lewis returned a Bob Waterfield interception for 12 yards to the Cleveland 32-yard line during the Browns' 24–17 loss to the Rams in the NFL title game at the Los Angeles Coliseum. After the 1951 season, Lewis retired from the Browns to devote himself full-time to his insurance business.

== Later life and death ==
In 1961–62, Lewis worked as a color commentator on Browns television broadcasts, and became vice president of insurance administration for the New York Yankees following the team's purchase by George Steinbrenner in 1973. He participated in the retired players division of the NFL players' golf tournament in Hollywood, Florida, in January 1961. He was inducted into the Greater Cleveland Sports Hall of Fame in 1976. Lewis died at the age of 79 in Tampa, Florida, following an extended illness in 2002.
