= 1950 NFL Championship Game =

Coordinates: 41.506°N 81.700°W

Los Angeles Rams (National) (9–3)	Cleveland Browns (American) (10–2)
28	30
Head coach: Joe Stydahar	Head coach: Paul Brown
	1	2	3	4	Total
LA	14	0	14	0	28
CLE	7	6	7	10	30
- Date: December 24, 1950
- Stadium: Cleveland Municipal Stadium; Cleveland, Ohio
- Attendance: 29,751

TV in the United States
- Network: ABC
- Announcers: Harry Wismer, Red Grange

Location in the United States

The 1950 NFL Championship Game was the 18th National Football League (NFL) title game, played on Sunday, December 24 at Cleveland Stadium in Cleveland, Ohio.

This was the first NFL championship game played between two expansion teams. In their first NFL season after four years in the rival All-America Football Conference, the Cleveland Browns defeated the Los Angeles Rams, 30–28. The championship was the first of three won by Cleveland in the 1950s under head coach Paul Brown behind an offense that featured quarterback Otto Graham, fullback Marion Motley, and ends Dante Lavelli and Mac Speedie.

Cleveland began the season with a win against the Philadelphia Eagles, who had won the previous two NFL championships. The Browns won all but two of their regular-season games, both losses coming against the New York Giants. Cleveland ended the season with a 10–2 win–loss record, tied with the Giants for first place in the American Conference, forcing a playoff that the Browns won, 8–3.

Los Angeles, meanwhile, finished the season 9–3, tied with the Chicago Bears for first place in the National Conference, forcing a playoff that the Rams won 24–14.

Thus, the Championship Game would see the Browns play host to the Rams with the Browns being four-point favorites.

The game began with a long touchdown pass from Rams quarterback Bob Waterfield to halfback Glenn Davis on the first play from scrimmage, giving Los Angeles an early lead. Cleveland tied the game later in the first quarter with a touchdown from Graham to Dub Jones, but the Rams quickly went ahead again on a Dick Hoerner touchdown run. Cleveland scored two unanswered touchdowns in the second and third quarters, retaking a 20–14 lead. A pair of Rams touchdowns in the third quarter, however, gave Los Angeles a two-possession advantage going into the final period. Cleveland responded with a diving touchdown catch by Rex Bumgardner in the final minutes of the game, followed by a field goal by placekicker Lou Groza with 28 seconds left to win, 30–28.

Lavelli set a then championship-game record with 11 receptions, and Waterfield's 82-yard pass to Davis on the first play of the game was then the longest scoring play in championship history. Los Angeles had 407 total yards to Cleveland's 373, but Cleveland had five interceptions, compared to just one for the Rams. The Browns' Warren Lahr had two interceptions in the game.

After the game, NFL Commissioner Bert Bell called the Cleveland Browns "the greatest team ever to play football".

== Background ==
Before the 1950 season, the NFL added three teams from the All-America Football Conference (AAFC), a competing league that went out of business as part of a peace deal negotiated in 1949. After the addition of the Cleveland Browns, Baltimore Colts, and San Francisco 49ers, the NFL reorganized its Eastern and Western divisional structure into the American and National conferences. The Browns were placed in the American Conference with a group of teams mostly from the old Eastern Division, while the 49ers and Colts went into the National Conference with teams from the old Western Division. Under NFL rules at the time, the teams with the best records in each conference after the 12-game regular season were to play each other in the NFL championship to determine the winner of the league.

The 1950 season ended with ties for first place in both the American and National conferences, forcing two playoff games for spots in the championship. The Browns tied with the New York Giants for the best record in the American Conference, while the Los Angeles Rams and Chicago Bears tied atop the National Conference. It was the first time in league history that both of the NFL's conferences (or divisions) ended in a tie for first place. The Browns defeated the Giants 8–3 in their playoff, and the Rams beat the Bears 24–20 to set up a Rams-Browns championship.

=== Cleveland Browns ===
The Browns had been the AAFC's most dominant team, winning all four of its championships between its founding in 1946 and 1949 under head coach Paul Brown. The team, however, was seen by some NFL owners and sportswriters as merely the best squad in an inferior league. NFL commissioner Bert Bell scheduled a matchup between the Browns and the two-time defending champion Philadelphia Eagles in the first game of the season, played a day before the league's other games. A crowd of 71,237 people saw the game, an attendance record in Philadelphia and the ninth-largest in professional football history at the time. After Cleveland won the game, NFL commissioner Bert Bell named Browns quarterback Otto Graham the game's most valuable player and gave him a trophy, calling the Browns "the greatest team to ever play the game".

Cleveland lost for the first time in the third week of the season against the Giants. That was followed by victories over the Chicago Cardinals and Pittsburgh Steelers, but Cleveland lost again to the Giants in the sixth week of the season. The team proceeded to win all of its remaining games, however, thanks in large part to an offense led by Graham, fullback Marion Motley, ends Mac Speedie and Dante Lavelli, and tackle/placekicker Lou Groza. Cleveland's offense was fourth in the NFL in scoring, with 310 points. The defense, meanwhile, finished second in points allowed, with 144. Cleveland played all of its games against American Conference opponents, aside from two matchups against the other former AAFC teams, the Colts and the 49ers.

Cleveland's record was 10–2 at the end of the regular season, leaving the team tied with the Giants and forcing a playoff to determine the conference winner. The Browns won a coin toss to determine home-field advantage. The game, played in cold weather at Cleveland Stadium, was a low-scoring affair that the Browns won 8–3 on a pair of Groza field goals and a safety.

=== Los Angeles Rams ===
The Rams began the season with a loss to the Chicago Bears. Victories over the New York Yanks and 49ers followed, but the team fell to 2–2 with a loss to the Eagles in the fourth week of the season. Los Angeles then went on a six-game winning streak that included a 70–27 blowout of the Colts and a 65–24 win over the Detroit Lions. The Rams lost the second-to-last game of the season, again against the Bears, and finished with a 9–3 record. That tied the Rams with the Bears atop the National Conference, forcing a playoff that Los Angeles won, setting up a championship matchup with the Browns in Cleveland.

The Rams, who left Cleveland after the 1945 season for Los Angeles, were making their second straight appearance in an NFL title game. The Rams had one of the most potent offenses in NFL history in 1950 under head coach Joe Stydahar. It featured Bob Waterfield and Norm Van Brocklin at quarterback, Tom Fears and Bob Boyd at end, and Elroy Hirsch at halfback.

The Rams averaged 309 passing yards per game, a record that stood until 1984. The team's running unit, led by Dick Hoerner, Vitamin Smith, and Dan Towler, averaged more than 140 yards a game. Los Angeles averaged 38.8 points per game in 1950, an NFL record that still stood as of 2026. Los Angeles ended the regular season first in the NFL in points scored, with 466. The team was ninth of 13 teams in points allowed, however, with 309.

== Game summary ==
While the Rams were unmatched offensively, the Browns' defense gave up half as many points during the regular season. Cleveland coach Paul Brown announced before the game that he would employ an umbrella defense against the Rams, similar to the one the Giants had used effectively against the Browns. His plan was to show Los Angeles the umbrella formation at first but switch back to the team's usual formation soon after. He abandoned the umbrella defense after the Rams scored a touchdown on their first play.

Team	1	2	3	4	Total
Rams	14	0	14	0	28
• Browns	7	6	7	10	30

- Date: December 24
- Location: Cleveland Stadium
- Game start: 1:30 p.m. EST
- Game attendance: 29,751
- Game weather: dry, 29 °F (−2 °C), 28 mph (45 km/h) wind,
- Referee: Ronald Gibbs
- Source: Pro Football Reference

Scoring summary
1	LAR	Glenn Davis 82-yard pass from Bob Waterfield (Bob Waterfield kick)	LAR 7–0
1	CLE	Dub Jones 27-yard pass from Otto Graham (Lou Groza kick)	7–7
1	LAR	Dick Hoerner 3-yard rush (Bob Waterfield kick)	LAR 14–7
2	CLE	Dante Lavelli 37-yard pass from Otto Graham (kick failed)	LAR 14–13
3	CLE	Dante Lavelli 39-yard pass from Otto Graham (Lou Groza kick)	CLE 20–14
3	LAR	Dick Hoerner 1-yard rush (Bob Waterfield kick)	LAR 21–20
3	LAR	Larry Brink 6-yard fumble return (Bob Waterfield kick)	LAR 28–20
4	CLE	Rex Bumgardner 14-yard pass from Otto Graham (Lou Groza kick)	LAR 28–27
4	CLE	Lou Groza 16-yard field goal	CLE 30–28

The championship game took place on Christmas Eve in Cleveland a week after the conference playoffs. The weather was dry, with 28 mph (45 km/h) winds and a temperature of 29 °F (−2 °C). On the Rams' first play after the opening kickoff, Waterfield passed to Glenn Davis for an 82-yard touchdown, giving Los Angeles an early 7–0 lead. Martin was covering Davis, but slipped on the slick turf, leaving the receiver open. Graham and the Browns' offense responded with a drive later in the first quarter that evened the score, but the Rams went ahead again by a touchdown on a three-yard Hoerner rush. Cleveland scored a second touchdown in the second quarter, this time a 37-yard pass from Graham to Lavelli. Groza's extra point attempt failed, however, because of a high snap, putting the Browns behind by one point. Waterfield missed a 15-yard field goal attempt at the end of the first half, leaving the score at 14–13 at halftime.

Cleveland took the lead again in the third quarter on a 39-yard touchdown pass to Lavelli, his second of the day. The Rams responded with a touchdown run by Hoerner and another touchdown quickly thereafter when Motley fumbled and Los Angeles's Larry Brink took it into the end zone. Down 28–20 as the fourth quarter began, Cleveland was helped by interceptions by Thompson and Lahr that put its offense in good field position. On a drive with 10 minutes left to play, Cleveland went for fourth down three times and made the necessary yards each time, advancing to the Los Angeles 14-yard line. From there, Graham threw a touchdown pass to Bumgardner, who dove to catch it in the corner of the end zone. After several more defensive stands, the Browns had the ball back and drove toward the Rams' end zone as the game drew to a close. Graham fumbled, however, and the Rams recovered with three minutes left. Cleveland's defense held, and Los Angeles punted, giving the Browns the ball back at their own 31-yard line with 1:49 left in the game. Graham scrambled up the middle for 16 yards on the first play, and then turned to his receivers. A pass to Bumgardner and two to Jones on the sidelines, followed by another to Bumgardner, put the ball at the Los Angeles 11-yard line. Graham ran a quarterback sneak on the next play to place the ball at the middle of the field in preparation for a field goal. After a time out, Groza came in and kicked the field goal with 0:28 left on the clock to put Cleveland ahead 30–28. The Rams fumbled the ensuing kickoff and the Browns recovered, appearing to seal the victory. The officials ruled that Groza had kicked prematurely, however, and Los Angeles returned his rekick to their 46-yard line. An interception by Lahr on a sideline pass stopped the drive and gave Cleveland the win.

After the game, Bert Bell called the Browns "the greatest team ever to play football." Brown later remembered it as the best game he ever saw, pointing to the success both teams had passing the ball at a time when the emphasis was shifting across the league from running to passing. Cleveland and Los Angeles played again in the 1951 championship, which the Rams won, 24–17. The Browns went on to appear in each championship game between 1952 and 1955, including a win over the Rams in 1955.

== Officials ==
- Referee: Ronald Gibbs
- Umpire: Samuel Wilson
- Head linesman: Charlie Berry
- Back judge: Norman Duncan
- Field judge: Lloyd Brazil

The NFL added the fifth official, the back judge, in 1947; the line judge arrived in 1965, and the side judge in 1978.

== Final statistics ==
Lavelli caught 11 passes, which set an NFL championship record that stood for eight years. He had 128 yards and two touchdowns. The Rams' Fears also had a strong game, with nine receptions for 136 yards. While Waterfield threw four interceptions, he otherwise performed well, completing 18 passes for 312 yards and a touchdown. His touchdown pass on the first play of the game to Davis was the longest score ever in a championship at the time. Graham, meanwhile, had 22 completions for 298 yards and four touchdowns.

Despite a high score, both defenses played well. Los Angeles was able to hold Motley, Cleveland's most dangerous rusher, completely in check. The Browns had five interceptions, including two by Lahr, and managed to stop the Rams from building a large lead in the fourth quarter, thanks in part to Len Ford's disruptive play at defensive end.

=== Team statistics ===
Statistics	Cleveland	Los Angeles
First downs	22	22
Rush attempts–yards	25–116	36–106
Rushing touchdowns	0	2
Pass completions–yards	22–298	18–312
Passing touchdowns	4	1
Total yards	373	407
Interceptions–return yards	5–54	1–11
Fumbles–lost	3–3	0–0
Turnovers	4	5
Penalties–yards	3–35	4–48
Sacked–yards	5–41	1–11
Punts–average	5–38.4	4–50.8

=== Individual statistics ===
Passing
Player	Cmp	Att	Yds	TD	INT
Cleveland Browns
Otto Graham	22	33	298	4	1
Los Angeles Rams
Bob Waterfield	18	31	312	1	4
Norm Van Brocklin	0	1	0	0	1

Rushing
Player	Att	Yds	TD
Cleveland Browns
Otto Graham	12	99	0
Marion Motley	6	9	0
Dub Jones	2	4	0
Rex Bumgardner	5	2	0
Los Angeles Rams
Dick Hoerner	24	86	2
Vitamin Smith	4	11	0
Glenn Davis	6	6	0
Bob Waterfield	1	2	0
Ralph Pasquariello	1	1	0

Receiving
Player	Rec	Yds	TD
Cleveland Browns
Dante Lavelli	11	128	2
Dub Jones	4	80	1
Rex Bumgardner	4	46	1
Horace Gillom	1	29	0
Mac Speedie	1	17	0
Marion Motley	1	−2	0
Los Angeles Rams
Tom Fears	9	136	0
Glenn Davis	2	88	1
Vitamin Smith	3	46	0
Elroy Hirsch	4	42	0

Defense
Player	Int	Yds	FumR	Yds	TD
Cleveland Browns
Warren Lahr	2	14	0	0	0
Ken Gorgal	1	33	0	0	0
Hal Herring	1	7	0	0	0
Tommy Thompson	1	0	0	0	0
Los Angeles Rams
Fred Naumetz	1	11	0	0	0
Larry Brink	0	0	1	6	1

Kick returns
Player	Ret	Yds	TD	Lng
Cleveland Browns
Ken Carpenter	3	58	0	28
Los Angeles Rams
Vitamin Smith	3	59	0	28
Jerry Williams	1	35	0	35
Tommy Kalmanir	1	32	0	32

Punt returns
Player	Ret	Yds	TD	Lng
Cleveland Browns
Cliff Lewis	2	22	0	16
Los Angeles Rams
Glenn Davis	1	14	0	14
Tony Kalmanir	1	0	0	0

Kicking
Player	FG	FG Att	XP	XP Att	Punts	Yds
Cleveland Browns
Lou Groza	1	1	3	3	0	0
Horace Gillom	0	0	0	0	5	192
Tommy James	0	0	0	1	0	0
Los Angeles Rams
Bob Waterfield	0	1	4	4	4	203

== Players' shares ==
The gross receipts for the game, including about $45,000 for radio and television rights, was under $158,000. Each player on the winning Browns team received $1,113, while Rams players made $686 each.

== See also ==
- 1950 NFL playoffs
