= Lou Groza =

American football player (1924–2000)

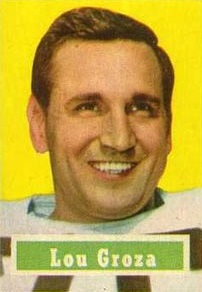
- Groza in 1957

No. 46, 76
- Positions: Offensive tackle, placekicker

Personal information
- Born: January 25, 1924; Martins Ferry, Ohio, U.S.
- Died: November 29, 2000 (aged 76); Middleburg Heights, Ohio, U.S.
- Listed height: 6 ft 3 in (1.91 m)
- Listed weight: 240 lb (109 kg)

Career information
- High school: Martins Ferry
- College: Ohio State (1942)
- NFL draft: 1946: undrafted

Career history

Playing
- Cleveland Browns (1946–1959; 1961–1967)

Coaching
- Cleveland Browns (1969) Placekickers coach

Awards and highlights
- SN NFL Most Valuable Player (1954); 4× NFL champion (1950, 1954, 1955, 1964); 4× AAFC champion (1946–1949); 4× First-team All-Pro (1952–1955); 2× Second-team All-Pro (1956, 1957); Second-team All-AAFC (1946); 9× Pro Bowl (1950–1955, 1957–1959); NFL scoring leader (1957); AAFC scoring leader (1946); NFL 1950s All-Decade Team; NFL 50th Anniversary All-Time Team; Cleveland Browns Ring of Honor; Cleveland Browns No. 76 retired

Career AAFC/NFL statistics
- Field goals made: 264
- Field goals attempted: 481
- Field goal percentage: 54.9%
- Extra points made: 810
- Extra points attempted: 833
- Longest field goal: 53
- Stats at Pro Football Reference
- Pro Football Hall of Fame

Louis Roy Groza (January 25, 1924 – November 29, 2000), nicknamed "the Toe", was an American professional football player. An offensive tackle and placekicker, he spent his entire career for the Cleveland Browns in the All-America Football Conference (AAFC) and National Football League (NFL). Groza was professional football's career kicking and points leader when he retired after the 1967 season. He played in 21 seasons for the Browns, helping the team to win eight league championships in that span. Groza's accuracy and strength as a kicker influenced the development of place-kicking as a specialty; he could kick field goals from beyond 50 yards (46 m) at a time when attempts from that distance were a rarity. He set numerous records for distance and number of field goals kicked during his career.

Groza grew up in an athletic family in Martins Ferry, Ohio. He enrolled at The Ohio State University on a scholarship in 1942, but after just one year in college, he enlisted in the U.S. Army and was sent to serve in World War II. Groza deployed as an army surgical technician in the Pacific theater, where he stayed until returning in 1946 to play for the Browns. Helped by Groza's kicking and play at offensive tackle, the Browns won the AAFC championship every year between 1946 and 1949, when the league disbanded and the Browns were absorbed by the more established NFL. Cleveland won the NFL championship in its first year in the league on a last-minute field goal by Groza. Groza set NFL records for field goals made in 1950, 1952 and 1953. Sporting News named him the league's Most Valuable Player in 1954, when the Browns won another championship. The team repeated as NFL champions in 1955.

Groza retired briefly after the 1959 season due to a back injury, but returned in 1961. He was part of a 1964 team that won another NFL championship. Groza retired for good after the 1967 season. Later in life, he ran an insurance business and served as a team ambassador for the Browns. He was elected to the Pro Football Hall of Fame in 1974. In 1992, the Palm Beach County Sports Commission named the Lou Groza Award after him. The award is given annually to the country's best college placekicker. Groza died in 2000 of a heart attack.

== Early life ==
Born in eastern Ohio in Martins Ferry, just north and across the Ohio River from Wheeling, West Virginia, Groza's parents were immigrants from Transylvania (today in Romania). His Hungarian mother Mary and Romanian father John (Ioan) Groza owned and ran Groza's Tavern on Main Street. Lou was the smallest in stature of four boys in an athletic family; his brother Alex became a star basketball player at the University of Kentucky, a member of two national championship teams.

Groza lettered in football, basketball, and baseball at Martins Ferry High School. The Purple Riders won the state basketball championship in 1941, when Groza was its captain. He was also captain of the baseball team. Groza learned placekicking from his older brother Frank, and practiced by trying to kick footballs over telephone wires when he and his friends played touch football in the street.

== College career and military service ==
Groza graduated from high school in 1942 and enrolled on an athletic scholarship at the Ohio State University in Columbus, where he played as a tackle and placekicker on the Buckeyes' freshman team. Groza played in three games and kicked five field goals, including one from 45 yards (41 m) away. In 1943, he enlisted in the U.S. Army as World War II intensified. He first went for basic training to Abilene, Texas, and then to the Brooke Army Medical Center at Fort Sam Houston in San Antonio.

After a stint with the short-lived Army Service Training Program, Groza was sent with the 96th Infantry Division to serve as a surgical technician in Leyte, Okinawa, and other places in the Pacific theater in 1945. The day he landed in the Philippines, Groza saw a soldier shot in the face. He was stationed in a bank of tents about five miles from the front lines and helped doctors tend to the wounded. "I saw a lot of men wounded with severe injuries", he later said. "Lose legs, guts hanging out, stuff like that. It's a tough thing, but you get hardened to it, and you accept it as part of your being there."

While he was in the Army, he received a package from Paul Brown, the Ohio State football coach. It contained footballs and a contract for him to sign to play on a team Brown was coaching in the new All-America Football Conference (AAFC). He signed the contract in May 1945 and agreed to join the team, called the Cleveland Browns, after the war ended in 1946. Groza got $500 a month stipend until the end of the war and a $7,500 annual salary.

== Professional career ==
Following his discharge from military service, Groza reported to the Browns' training camp in Bowling Green, Ohio. He showed up in army fatigues carrying all his clothes in a duffel bag. There, he joined quarterback Otto Graham, fullback Marion Motley and receivers Dante Lavelli and Mac Speedie to form the core of the new team's offense. Groza was mainly a placekicker in his first two years with the Browns, but he played a big part in the team's early success. In his first season, he set a professional football record for both field goals and extra points. The Browns, meanwhile, advanced to the AAFC championship against the New York Yankees. Groza sprained his ankle in the game and missed three field goals, but Cleveland won 14–9. Behind a powerful offense led by Graham, Motley and Lavelli, the Browns finished the 1947 season with a 12–1–1 record and made it back to the championship game. Groza, however, was injured and could only watch as the team won its second championship in a row.

Further success followed for the Browns and Groza, who was nicknamed "the Toe" by a sportswriter for his kicking abilities. Groza led the league in field goals and the team won all of its games in 1948, recording professional football's first perfect season. As he grew into a star placekicker, Groza began playing regularly at offensive tackle beginning in 1948. One highlight of that year for Groza was a 53-yard field goal against the AAFC's Brooklyn Dodgers that was then the longest kick in pro football history. With Groza, the Browns could attempt field goals at a range many other teams could not. "Anywhere from 40 to 50 yards (37 to 46 m), he was a weapon", Tommy James, Groza's holder for eight years, later said. Another championship win followed in 1949, but the AAFC dissolved after the season, and the Browns were among three teams absorbed by the more established National Football League (NFL).

The war had shortened Groza's college career, so he continued to study at Ohio State in the offseason in his early years with the Browns. He graduated with a degree in business in 1949. Groza married that year, to Jackie Lou Robbins, a girl from Martins Ferry who was working as a model in New York City when they first dated.

The Browns' debut in the NFL in the 1950 season was closely watched; while the team dominated the AAFC in its short existence, some sportswriters, NFL owners and coaches considered the league inferior. Cleveland put all doubts to rest in its first game against the two-time defending champion Philadelphia Eagles, winning 35–10. In a game against the Washington Redskins later in the season, Groza broke a 24-year-old NFL record by kicking his 13th field goal of the season. He also scored the only touchdown of his career in that game on a reception from Graham. The Browns ended the regular season with a 10–2 record in the American Conference, tied with the New York Giants. That forced a playoff against the Giants in which Groza kicked the winning field goal for the Browns with under a minute to play.

The game-winning field goal in the 1950 NFL championship was the highlight of Groza's long career.

The Browns next faced the Los Angeles Rams in the championship game. Groza came into the game as the NFL's leading kicker, both in terms of points scored and accuracy. He had a success rate of 68.4% in an era when most teams made fewer than half of their attempts. The Rams went ahead early in the game on a touchdown pass from star quarterback Bob Waterfield and a scoring run by Dick Hoerner. But Graham and the Browns came back with four touchdowns, two to receiver Dante Lavelli. As time wound down in the fourth quarter, however, the Rams were ahead 28–27, and Cleveland had a final chance to win the game. Graham drove the offense to the Rams' nine-yard line and set up a Groza field goal attempt. The 16-yard try sailed through the uprights with 28 seconds left, giving the Browns a 30–28 victory. It was the biggest kick of Groza's career. "I never thought I would miss", he said later. After the season, Groza was named to the first-ever Pro Bowl, the NFL's all-star game.

Cleveland again reached the championship game in 1951, but lost this time in a rematch against the Rams. Groza had a 52-yard field goal in the game, a record for a championship or Super Bowl that stood for 42 years. He was again named to the Pro Bowl after the season. The same scenario was repeated in 1952 and 1953: the Browns reached the championship both years, but lost both times to the Detroit Lions. Groza was playing with cracked ribs in the 1952 championship loss, and he missed three field goals. Groza set a record in 1953 when he made 23 field goals and had an 88.5% success rate, a single-season mark that stood for 28 years. He made the Pro Bowl again in 1952 and 1953, and was a first-team All-Pro selection both years.

The Browns came back in 1954 to win another championship. That year, Groza was named the NFL's Most Valuable Player by Sporting News. Cleveland won the championship again in 1955, beating the Rams 38–14. Groza was named to the Pro Bowl and sportswriters' All-Pro teams in 1954 and 1955.

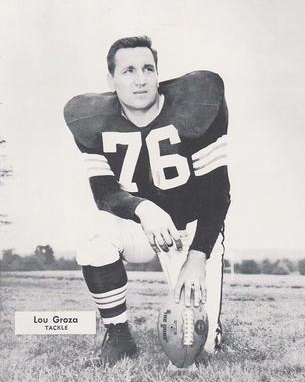
Lou "The Toe" Groza in 1959

Hurt by Graham's retirement before the season, Cleveland had its first-ever losing season in 1956. Groza's kicking continued to be a strength through the ensuing three years: he reached the Pro Bowl in 1957, 1958 and 1959, and tied Sam Baker for league leader in points scored in 1957. Cleveland reached the championship game in 1957 but lost to the Lions. The Browns lost to the New York Giants in a single-elimination playoff in 1958, and failed to reach the postseason in 1959. Groza sat out after the 1959 season due to a back injury and was presumed to be retired. While his kicking was his most visible contribution to the team, Groza was also an offensive tackle up until his injury, when Brown replaced him with Dick Schafrath. "Lou never got all the credit he deserved for his tackle play, probably because his great kicking skills got him more notoriety", Andy Robustelli, a defensive end who played against Groza, later said.

Groza took 1960 off and did some scouting for the team. He also focused on an insurance business he started. "I was 36 and I thought I had retired", he said. The following year, however, he came back to the team at the urging of Art Modell, who bought the Browns that year. Not wanting to use a roster spot on a kicking specialist (Groza's back injury prevented him from playing on the line), Brown had signed Sam Baker to kick and play halfback. But Groza was eager to return and Modell insisted. Groza stayed with the team as a placekicker until 1967, and was on a Browns team that won the 1964 championship. Groza scored the first points in that game on a third-quarter field goal. He also kicked four kickoffs more than 70 yards (64 m) and out of the Baltimore Colts end zone, preventing a return. Cleveland won 27–0.

When Groza retired for good in 1968 after 21 seasons in professional football, he held NFL career records for points scored, field goals made and extra points made. He had 234 field goals, 641 extra points, and 1,349 total points in the NFL. Counting his AAFC years, his career point total was 1,603. He was the last of the original Browns still on the team. Groza, who was 44 years old when he quit the game, said in his memoir that retiring was "the saddest day of my football life." His top salary was $50,000 in his final year.

== Later life and death ==
After Groza retired, he entertained an offer to play for the San Francisco 49ers, but was reluctant to do so because he did not want to move his family and insurance business to the West Coast. He was offered a spot with the Browns as a kicking coach, helping mentor the young Don Cockroft, but he declined. Later in life, he became an ambassador and father figure for the Browns, inviting rookies over for dinner and helping them find apartments. He continued to run a successful insurance business and lived in Berea, Ohio near the Browns' headquarters and training facility. He and his wife Jackie were known as the team's First Family.

Modell relocated the Browns to Baltimore in 1995 and renamed the team the Ravens, provoking a wave of anger and disbelief from fans and former players. Groza was a leading critic of the move, saying it was "like some man walking off with your wife." In 1996, Groza wrote a memoir titled The Toe: The Lou Groza Story. The Browns restarted as an expansion team in 1999.

Groza was hobbled in the late 1990s by back and hip surgeries and Parkinson's disease. He suffered a heart attack in 2000 after dinner with his wife at Columbia Hills Country Club in Columbia Station, Ohio. He was taken to Southwest General Health Center in Middleburg Heights, Ohio, where he died. He was buried in Sunset Memorial Park in North Olmsted, Ohio. Groza and his wife had three sons and a daughter. Following Groza's death, the Browns wore his number 76 on their helmets for the 2001 season.

== Kicking style ==
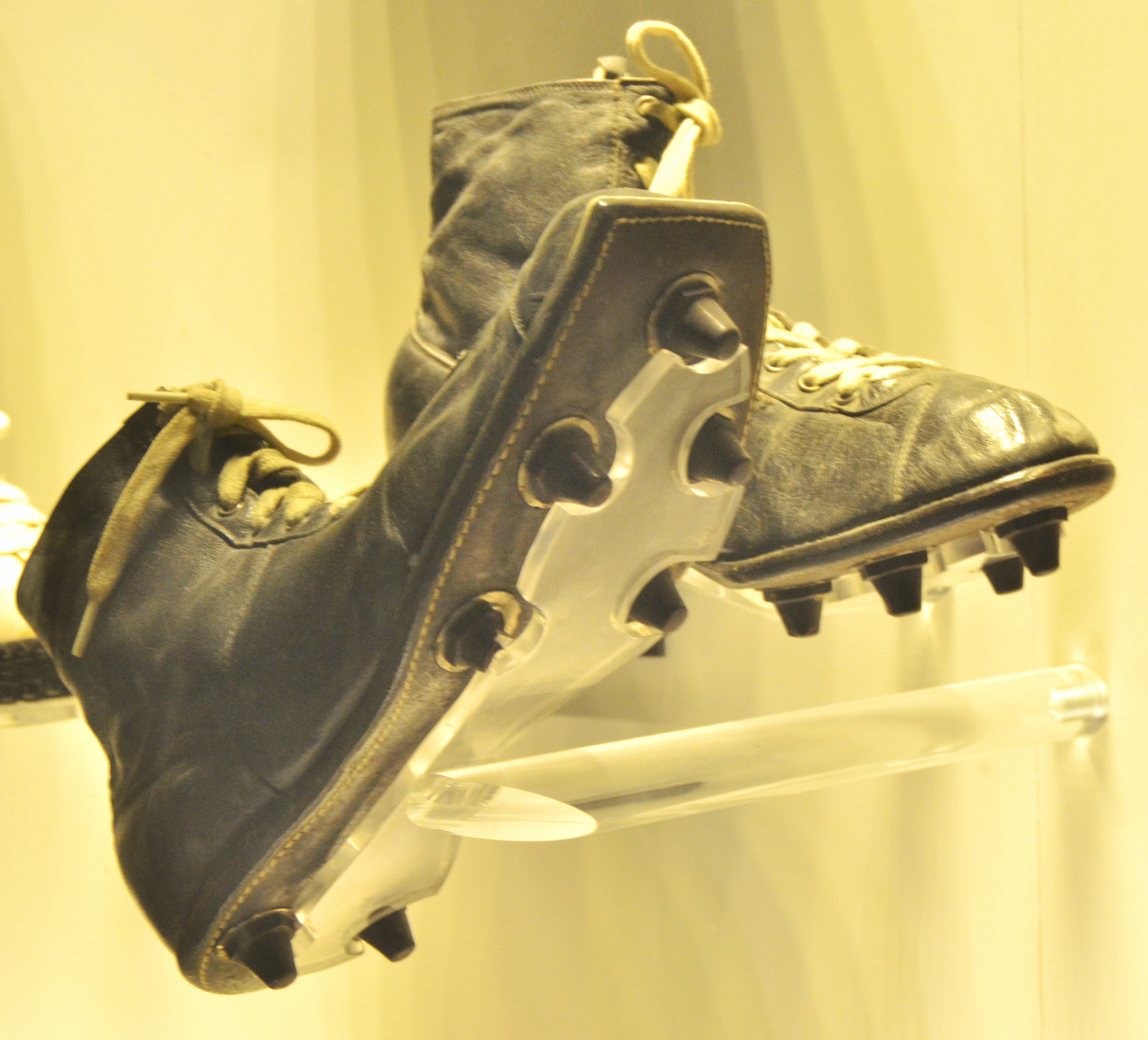
Lou Groza's kicking shoes

Groza laid a piece of tape on the ground for better accuracy before the practice was outlawed by the "Lou Groza Rule".

While field goals had long been viewed as an important part of football strategy, kicking specialists were a rarity before Groza's time. Groza's success from distances of 40 yards (37 m) and beyond raised the bar for kickers across the league. He set single-season NFL records for accuracy, distance and number of field goals in his first three years in the league, marks that went unbeaten until kicking specialists became a common feature of the game in the early 1970s.

Groza's kicking was the difference in 15% of the Browns' games during the AAFC years, and teams began to take notice when his field goals made the difference in both the NFL playoffs and the championship game in 1950. "Everybody started to pay attention to field goals when the Browns started to win games with them", Pat Summerall said. Groza led the NFL in field goals made five times in his career.

Groza was a straight-ahead kicker. He approached the football in a straight line and booted it with the top of his foot, aiming for the middle of the ball. Early in his career, Groza scraped the ground with his cleats in a straight line to help guide his kicks. Later he put down a piece of one-inch adhesive tape rolled up inside his helmet.

The "Lou Groza Rule" in 1950 banned the use of artificial kicking aids, including the tape. The straight-ahead style used by Groza and other kickers of his era has since been supplanted by soccer-style kicking with the side of the foot. "I don't know why all the kids kick soccer-style", he said in 1997. "They kick the ball with the side of their foot, which is supposed to give them better control. I don't know, I never tried it."

== Legacy ==
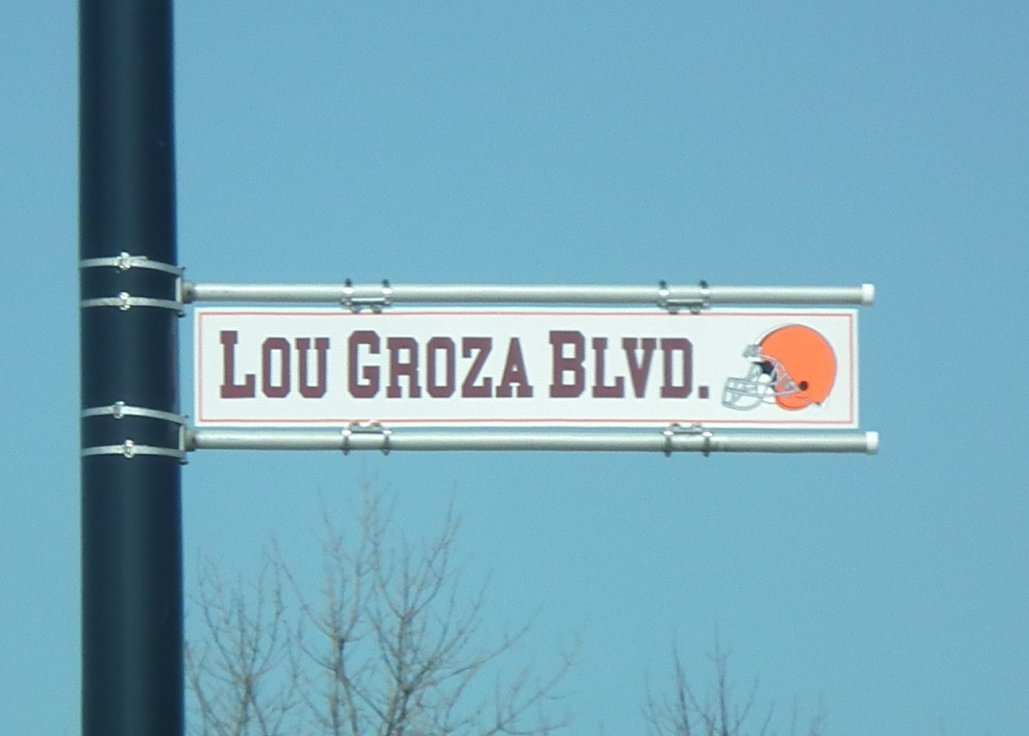
Lou Groza Boulevard in Berea, Ohio

Groza was named to the National Football League 1950s All-Decade Team in 1969 and inducted into the Pro Football Hall of Fame in 1974. The Browns retired his number 76; he is also in the team's Ring of Honor, a grouping of the best players in the club's history whose names are displayed below upper-deck seats at Huntington Bank Field. In 1992, the Palm Beach County Sports Commission established the Lou Groza Award, given to the best National Collegiate Athletic Association Football Bowl Subdivision (formerly Division I-A) kicker. One of his kicking shoes is part of the collection of the Smithsonian Institution in Washington, D.C. In 2006, Lou was inducted into the National High School Hall of Fame for his athletic exploits in baseball, basketball & football at Martins Ferry High School where he earned 12 varsity letters and led the football and basketball teams to State championships. In 1941 as a junior, Lou led the Martins Ferry High School basketball team to the class A championship. He set a State record for points scored in the four tournament games with 51. In the State semi-final game against Xenia Central, he hit two free throws with no time left on the clock to secure the victory. In the title game, he was high scorer with 18 points. He was named tournament MVP, a member of the All-State Tournament Team, and first-team All-Ohio center. In 1941 as a senior, he led the Martins Ferry High School football team to a share of the State championship tying Toledo Libbey 14-14. Lou started as offensive and defensive tackle as well as being the place kicker. He was selected first-team All-Ohio by both the Associated Press and United Press International. During his high school years, he was named Captain of the football, basketball and baseball teams.

The city of Berea, Ohio (where Groza settled after his retirement), has honored him in numerous ways:

- The street the Browns training facility is located was renamed 76 Lou Groza Boulevard
- In 2012, Lou Groza Field was built in Berea.
- The above field is home of the Lou Groza Football program, serving middle school aged children in suburban Cleveland.
- In 2016, Groza was honored with a statue in front of his namesake field.
