= 1950 NFL playoffs =

American football tournament

- Dates: December 17-24, 1950
- Season: 1950
- Teams: 4
- Games played: 3
- NFL Championship Game site: Cleveland Municipal Stadium; Cleveland, Ohio
- Defending champions: Philadelphia Eagles (did not qualify)
- Champion: Cleveland Browns (1st title)
- Runner-up: Los Angeles Rams
- Conference runners-up: New York Giants; Chicago Bears
NFL playoffs
← 1947	1952 →

The 1950 National Football League playoffs took place after the 1950 regular season ended with a tie for first place in both the American and National conferences. The ties forced one-game playoffs to determine who would play in the NFL championship game. It was the only time in the NFL's championship game era that two such tiebreaker playoff games were needed in the same year. The Cleveland Browns and New York Giants tied for first place in the American Conference, while the Chicago Bears and Los Angeles Rams tied for first place in the National Conference. The Browns proceeded to beat the Giants 8–3, and the Rams beat the Bears 24–14 in their playoff game. Cleveland then beat the Rams in the championship game the following week. The home teams won all three games in this postseason.

Playing their first year in the NFL after four years in the rival All-America Football Conference, the Browns battled with the Giants for the lead in the American Conference for most of the regular season. Cleveland ended with a 10–2 win–loss record, having lost its only two games against the Giants. The Giants, meanwhile, lost to the Pittsburgh Steelers and Chicago Cardinals. In the National Conference, the Bears and Rams were also near the top of the standings in the second half of the 12-game season, and both ended with 9–3 records.

The Browns and Giants and the Rams and Bears played their playoff games on December 17. In Cleveland against the Giants, the Browns won a low-scoring game in freezing conditions on two field goals by placekicker Lou Groza and a late-game safety. The Rams beat the Bears in 92-degree heat in Los Angeles, thanks largely to a strong performance by quarterback Bob Waterfield, who threw three touchdowns to end Tom Fears. Thus, both teams defeated divisional opponents they were unable to beat in the regular season (Browns 0-2 vs Giants; Rams 0-2 vs Bears). The results set up a championship matchup between the Browns and Rams. The Browns won their first NFL championship in franchise history 30–28 on a Groza field goal with 28 seconds to play.

== Background ==
When the All-America Football Conference (AAFC) folded in late 1949, three of its teams – the Cleveland Browns, San Francisco 49ers, and Baltimore Colts – were absorbed by the NFL. This forced a realignment of the NFL's divisions into the American and National conferences. The Browns went into the American Conference along with teams mostly from the NFL's old Eastern Division, while the 49ers and Colts went into the National Conference with teams from the old Western Division. Under NFL rules at the time, the teams with the best records in each conference after the 12-game regular season met in the NFL championship to determine the winner of the league.

The Browns and the New York Giants jockeyed for first place in the American Conference for most of the regular season. Cleveland ended with a 10–2 win–loss record, both of its losses coming against the Giants. The Giants ended with the same record, having lost to the Pittsburgh Steelers and Chicago Cardinals. In the National Conference, the New York Yanks, Chicago Bears, and Los Angeles Rams were at the top of the standings for most of the season. The Yanks faded with four losses in the final five games, however, leaving the Rams and Bears tied at 9–3 at the end of the season. The Rams lost two of their games against the Bears, while the Bears lost to the Yanks, Cardinals, and Green Bay Packers.

With both conferences tied, two playoffs were scheduled to determine which teams would play in the annual championship game. Cleveland won a coin toss to get home-field advantage in its matchup against the Giants on December 17, and Chicago played at Los Angeles on the same day. It was the only time in the championship game era between 1933 and 1966 when both NFL divisions ended in ties for first place, resulting in two playoff games.

== Tournament bracket ==
Conference tiebreaker playoff
December 17 – Los Angeles
Chicago Bears	14
Los Angeles	24
December 17 – Cleveland
New York	3
Cleveland	8

NFL Championship
December 24 – Cleveland
Los Angeles	28
Cleveland	30

== Conference playoff games ==
=== American Conference: Cleveland Browns vs. New York Giants ===
Team	1	2	3	4	Total
Giants	0	0	0	3	3
• Browns	3	0	0	5	8

- Date: Sunday, December 17
- Location: Cleveland Municipal Stadium, Cleveland, Ohio
- Game attendance: 33,054
- Source: Pro Football Reference

Scoring summary
1	CLE	Lou Groza 11-yard field goal	CLE 3–0
4	NYG	Randy Clay 20-yard field goal	3–3
4	CLE	Lou Groza 28-yard field goal	CLE 6–3
4	CLE	Safety, Charlie Conerly tackled in the end zone by Jim Martin	CLE 8–3

Cleveland and New York met in Cleveland on a frozen field as a stiff wind gusted through the stadium. Cleveland drove deep into New York's territory in the first quarter, but a stop by the Giants led to a Lou Groza field goal that put the Browns up 3–0. The game was a defensive struggle through the middle periods. Neither team scored again until the fourth quarter, when Giants quarterback Charlie Conerly led a drive to the Cleveland 36-yard line. From there, Conerly handed the ball to back Gene "Choo Choo" Roberts, who sprinted outside the right of the line and appeared headed for a touchdown. Cleveland linebacker Bill Willis chased him down and tackled him at the 4-yard line, however. Bob McChesney then caught a pass from Conerly in the end zone for an apparent touchdown on third down, but it was called back on an offside penalty. Cleveland's Tommy James intercepted Conerly's pass on the next play, but the Browns were called for holding, negating the turnover. The Giants got a new set of downs, but were unable to score a touchdown. A penalty sent them back to the 13-yard line, from where Randy Clay kicked a field goal to tie the score. On the Browns' ensuing drive, coach Paul Brown decided to switch strategies and focus on quarterback keeper plays, calculating that the Giants would be unprepared for runs by Otto Graham. Cleveland advanced to New York's 22-yard line thanks to 45 yards of rushing by Graham, which set up a 28-yard field goal that gave the Browns a 6–3 lead. On the Giants' final possession as time ran out, Martin tackled Conerly in his own end zone, resulting in a safety and making the final score 8–3. The Browns and Giants had only 91 combined passing yards during the game.

=== National Conference: Chicago Bears vs. Los Angeles Rams ===
Team	1	2	3	4	Total
Bears	0	7	0	7	14
• Rams	3	14	7	0	24

- Date: Sunday, December 17
- Location: Los Angeles Memorial Coliseum, Los Angeles, California
- Game attendance: 83,501
- Source: Pro Football Reference

Scoring summary
1	LAR	Bob Waterfield 43-yard field goal	LAR 3–0
2	CHI	Al Campana 22-yard rush (Johnny Lujack kick)	CHI 7–3
2	LAR	Tom Fears 43-yard pass from Bob Waterfield (Bob Waterfield kick)	LAR 10–7
2	LAR	Tom Fears 68-yard pass from Bob Waterfield (Bob Waterfield kick)	LAR 17–7
3	LAR	Tom Fears 27-yard pass from Bob Waterfield (Bob Waterfield kick)	LAR 24–7
4	CHI	Fred "Curly" Morrison 4-yard rush (Johnny Lujack kick)	LAR 24–14

The Bears and Rams faced off at Los Angeles Coliseum in 92-degree heat. The scoring began with a 43-yard field goal by Los Angeles quarterback Bob Waterfield in the first quarter, putting the Rams ahead 3–0. Chicago responded early in the second quarter with a 65-yard drive on eight plays, capped by a 22-yard touchdown run by Al Campana. The Bears' lead was short-lived, however. Waterfield threw two touchdown passes to end Tom Fears later in the second quarter, putting the Rams ahead 17–7 at halftime. The Rams pulled away with a third touchdown pass to Fears in the third quarter. Chicago tried to mount a comeback at the end of the game, but could only manage one touchdown, a 4-yard rush by halfback Fred "Curly" Morrison. The Los Angeles defense stopped the Bears on another fourth-quarter drive that reached the Rams' 2-yard line. Following the stop, a fight broke out at midfield between Chicago's George Blanda and the Rams' Dan Towler, leading to a bench-clearing fight that officials and coaches had to break up. The game ended shortly thereafter with the Rams ahead 24–14. Waterfield threw for 280 yards on 14 completions, while Chicago quarterback Johnny Lujack had only 198 yards on 14 completions. While Los Angeles was not known for its defense, it stopped Chicago on two long drives that could have gone for touchdowns. The win was an important one for Joe Stydahar, the Rams' head coach. He was in his first year coaching the Rams, and was going up against Bears coach George Halas, whom he had played under for several years.

== NFL Championship Game ==
Los Angeles had made it to the NFL championship game in 1949, making its appearance against the Browns its second straight. The Rams had one of the most potent offenses in NFL history in 1950. It featured Waterfield and Norm Van Brocklin at quarterback, Tom Fears and Bob Boyd at end and Elroy Hirsch at halfback. The Rams averaged 309 passing yards per game, a record that stood until 1984. The team's running unit, led by Dick Hoerner, Vitamin Smith and Dan Towler, averaged more than 140 yards a game. Los Angeles averaged 38.8 points per game in 1950, an NFL record that still stood as of 2025.

While the Rams were unmatched offensively, the Browns' defense gave up half as many points during the regular season. Brown announced before the game that he would employ an umbrella defense against the Rams, similar to the one the Giants had used effectively against the Browns. His plan was to show Los Angeles the umbrella formation at first but switch back to the team's usual formation soon after. He abandoned the umbrella defense after the Rams scored a touchdown on their first play.

Team	1	2	3	4	Total
Rams	14	0	14	0	28
• Browns	7	6	7	10	30

- Date: Sunday, December 24
- Location: Cleveland Municipal Stadium, Cleveland, Ohio
- Game attendance: 29,751
- Source: Pro Football Reference

Scoring summary
1	LAR	Glenn Davis 82-yard pass from Bob Waterfield (Bob Waterfield kick)	LAR 7–0
1	CLE	Dub Jones 27-yard pass from Otto Graham (Lou Groza kick)	7–7
1	LAR	Dick Hoerner 3-yard rush (Bob Waterfield kick)	LAR 14–7
2	CLE	Dante Lavelli 37-yard pass from Otto Graham (kick failed)	LAR 14–13
3	CLE	Dante Lavelli 39-yard pass from Otto Graham (Lou Groza kick)	CLE 20–14
3	LAR	Dick Hoerner 1-yard rush (Bob Waterfield kick)	LAR 21–20
3	LAR	Larry Brink 6-yard fumble return (Bob Waterfield kick)	LAR 28–20
4	CLE	Rex Bumgardner 14-yard pass from Otto Graham (Lou Groza kick)	LAR 28–27
4	CLE	Lou Groza 16-yard field goal	CLE 30–28

The championship game took place on Christmas Eve in Cleveland a week after the conference playoffs. On the Rams' first play after the opening kickoff, Waterfield passed to Glenn Davis for an 82-yard touchdown, giving Los Angeles an early 7–0 lead. Martin was covering Davis, but slipped on the slick turf, leaving the receiver open. Graham and the Browns' offense responded with a drive later in the first quarter that evened the score, but the Rams went ahead again by a touchdown on a three-yard Hoerner rush. Cleveland scored a second touchdown in the second quarter, this time a 37-yard pass from Graham to Lavelli. Groza's extra point attempt failed, however, because of a high snap, putting the Browns behind by one point. Waterfield missed a 15-yard field goal attempt at the end of the first half, leaving the score at 14–13 at halftime.

Cleveland took the lead again in the third quarter on a 39-yard touchdown pass to Lavelli, his second of the day. The Rams responded with a touchdown run by Hoerner and another touchdown quickly thereafter when Motley fumbled and Los Angeles's Larry Brink took it into the end zone. Down 28–20 as the fourth quarter began, Cleveland was helped by interceptions by Thompson and Lahr that put its offense in good field position. On a drive with 10 minutes left to play, Cleveland went for it on fourth down three times and made the necessary yards each time, advancing to the Los Angeles 14-yard line. From there, Graham threw a touchdown pass to Bumgardner, who dove to catch it in the corner of the end zone. After several more defensive stands, the Browns had the ball back and drove toward the Rams' end zone as the game drew to a close. Graham fumbled, however, and the Rams recovered with three minutes left. Cleveland's defense held, and Los Angeles punted, giving the Browns the ball back at their own 31-yard line with 1:49 left in the game. Graham scrambled up the middle for 16 yards on the first play, and then turned to his receivers. A pass to Bumgardner and two to Jones on the sidelines, followed by another to Bumgardner, put the ball at the Los Angeles 11-yard line. Graham ran a quarterback sneak on the next play to place the ball at the middle of the field in preparation for a field goal. After a time out, Groza came in and kicked the field goal with 0:28 left on the clock to put Cleveland ahead 30–28. The Rams fumbled the ensuing kickoff and the Browns recovered, appearing to seal the victory. The officials ruled that Groza had kicked prematurely, however, and Los Angeles returned his rekick to their 46-yard line. An interception by Lahr on a sideline pass stopped the drive and gave Cleveland the win.
