= 1950 Green Bay Packers season =

NFL team season

- Head coach: Gene Ronzani
- Home stadium: City Stadium; Wisconsin State Fair Park

Results
- Record: 3–9
- Division place: 5th (tied) National
- Playoffs: Did not qualify

The 1950 Green Bay Packers season was their 32nd season overall and their 30th season in the National Football League. The team finished with a 3–9 record under first-year head coach Gene Ronzani for a fifth-place finish in the National Conference.

== Offseason ==
To get the franchise on a firm financial footing, the team started selling stocks publicly for the first time. The stock drive netted $118,000. To replace Curly Lambeau, the Packers named Gene Ronzani as their new head coach and Vice President. The year also saw another change as the team changed its colors to green and yellow from the navy that the club had been wearing.

=== NFL draft ===
Incomplete list

1950 Green Bay Packers draft
Round	Selection	Player	Position	College	Notes
1	4	Clayton Tonnemaker	C	Minnesota	
2	17	Tobin Rote	QB	Rice	
3	27	Gordy Soltau	WR	Minnesota	
4	43	Larry Coutre	HB	Notre Dame	
6	69	Jack Cloud	FB	William & Mary	
7	82	Leon Manley	G	Oklahoma	
13	160	Carlton Elliott	DE	Virginia	
18	225	Arnold Galiffa	QB	Army	
25	316	Frank Waters	FB	Michigan State	
30	381	Ray Mallouf	QB	Southern Methodist	

- Yellow indicates a future Pro Bowl selection

== Regular season ==
=== Schedule ===
Game	Date	Opponent	Result	Record	Venue	Attendance	Recap	Sources
1	September 17	**Detroit Lions**	**L** 7–45	0–1	City Stadium	22,096	Recap	
2	September 24	Washington Redskins	**W** 35–21	1–1	Wisconsin State Fair Park	14,109	Recap	
3	October 1	**Chicago Bears**	**W** 31–21	2–1	City Stadium	24,893	Recap	
4	October 8	**New York Yanks**	**L** 31–44	2–2	City Stadium	23,871	Recap	
5	October 15	at **Chicago Bears**	**L** 14–28	2–3	Wrigley Field	51,065	Recap	
6	October 19	at **New York Yanks**	**L** 17–35	2–4	Yankee Stadium	13,661	Recap	
—	Bye							
7	November 5	at **Baltimore Colts**	**L** 21–41	2–5	Memorial Stadium	12,971	Recap	
8	November 12	**Los Angeles Rams**	**L** 14–45	2–6	Wisconsin State Fair Park	20,456	Recap	
9	November 19	at **Detroit Lions**	**L** 21–24	2–7	Briggs Stadium	17,752	Recap	
10	November 26	**San Francisco 49ers**	**W** 25–21	3–7	City Stadium	13,196	Recap	
11	December 3	at **Los Angeles Rams**	**L**14–51	3–8	Los Angeles Memorial Coliseum	39,323	Recap	
12	December 10	at **San Francisco 49ers**	**L** 14–30	3–9	Kezar Stadium	20,797	Recap	
Note: Intra-conference opponents are in **bold** text.

== Standings ==
Program for the September opener against the Detroit Lions.

NFL National Conference
	W	L	T	PCT	CONF	PF	PA	STK
Los Angeles Rams	9	3	0	.750	9–2	466	309	W1
Chicago Bears	9	3	0	.750	8–2	279	207	W1
New York Yanks	7	5	0	.583	7–4	366	367	W1
Detroit Lions	6	6	0	.500	5–6	321	285	L1
San Francisco 49ers	3	9	0	.250	3–8	213	300	W1
Green Bay Packers	3	9	0	.250	2–9	244	406	L2
Baltimore Colts	1	11	0	.083	1–4	213	462	L5

Note: Tie games were not officially counted in the standings until 1972.

=== Passing ===
Player	Games	Games Started	Completions	Attempts	Comp. %	Yards	Touchdowns	Interceptions
Tobin Rote	12	12	83	224	37.1%	1231	7	24
Paul Christman	11	1 (on def.)	51	126	40.5%	545	7	7
Tom O'Malley	1	0	4	15	26.7%	31	0	6
Bob Forte	12	0	2	2	100.0%	24	0	0

== Roster ==
1950 Green Bay Packers final roster
Quarterbacks: 28 Paul Christman; 38 Tobin Rote; Running backs: 3 Tony Canadeo; 82 Jack Cloud; 27 Larry Coutre; 64 Ted Fritsch K; 36 Jug Girard P/CB; 22 Billy Grimes; 80 Breezy Reid; Wide receivers: 19 Al Baldwin CB; 48 Ted Cook; 31 Bob Mann	Linemen/Linebackers: 33 Buddy Burris G; 21 Ray DiPierro G; 18 Chuck Drulis MG; 55 Ed Ecker T; 8 Bob Forte OLB/RB/P; 90 Leon Manley G/T; 44 Clarence McGeary DT; 58 Ed Neal MG/C; 49 Dan Orlich DE; 23 Steve Pritko DE/WR; 34 Joe Spencer T/DT; 63 Don Stansauk DT; 51 Len Szafaryn G/DT; 45 Dick Wildung T/DT; 16 Abner Wimberly DE/WR; 17 Carl Schuette OLB; 77 Bob Summerhays OLB; 35 Clayton Tonnemaker MLB/C	Defensive backs: 42 Wally Dreyer S; 74 Rebel Steiner CB; 25 Alex Wizbicki CB; Reserve: -- Joe Ethridge G (Military); -- Jay Rhodemyre C/LB (Military); Rookies in italics
