= List of Chicago Bears in the Pro Football Hall of Fame =

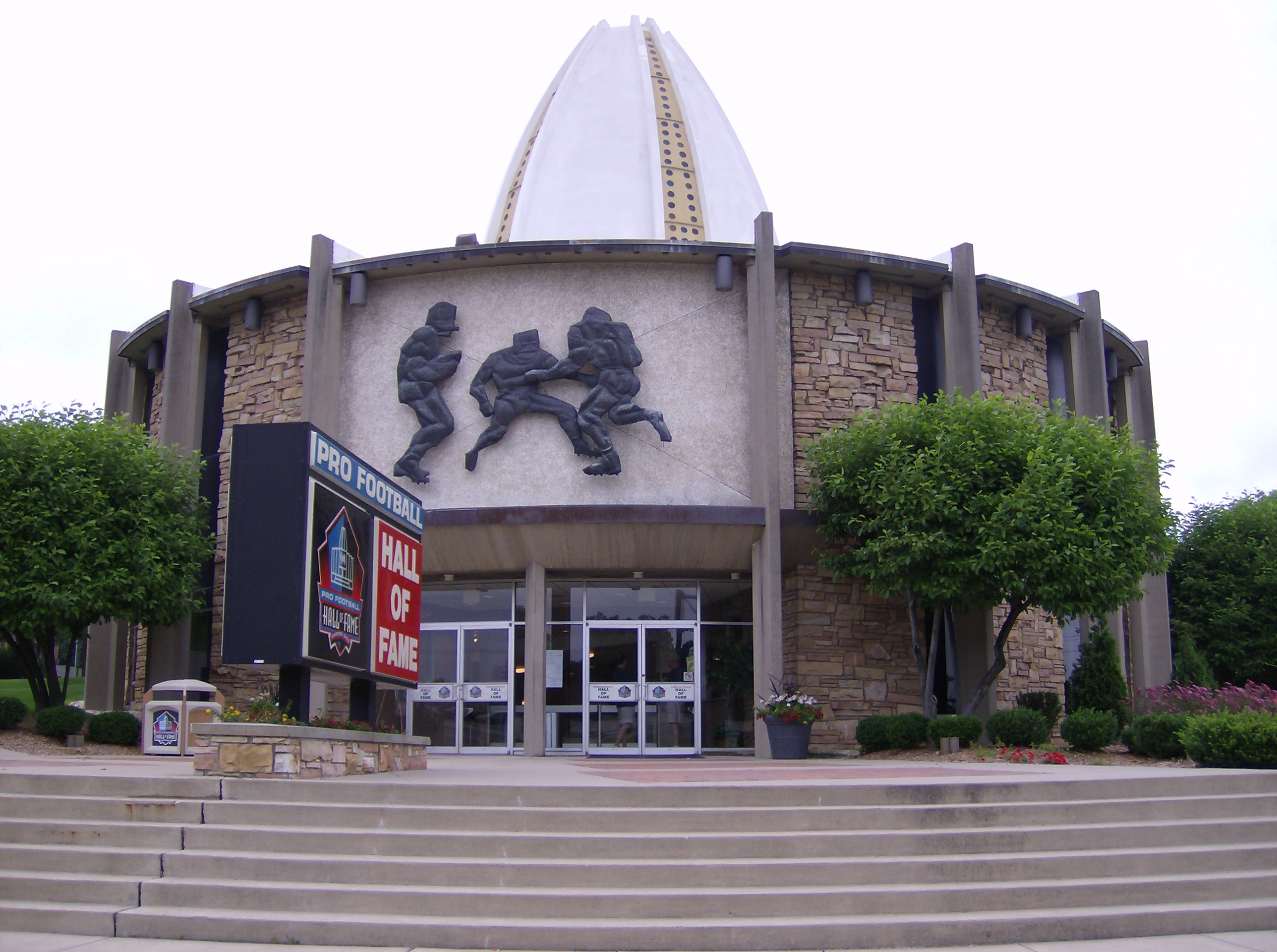
The Pro Football Hall of Fame in Canton, Ohio, established in 1963

The Chicago Bears are a professional American football team based in Chicago, Illinois. They are currently members of the North Division of the National Football Conference (NFC) in the National Football League (NFL), and are one of two remaining charter members of NFL. Founded in 1919 by the A.E. Staley Company as the Decatur Staleys and based in Chicago since 1922, the Bears organization has become one of the most successful professional football teams, having won a total of nine professional American football championships—eight NFL Championships and one Super Bowl—second most in the NFL, behind the Green Bay Packers. The franchise has recorded 18 NFL divisional titles, four NFL conference championships, and the second most regular season victories of any NFL franchise. In 1963, the Pro Football Hall of Fame was created to honor the history of professional American football and the individuals who have greatly influenced it. Since the charter induction class of 1963, 32 individuals who have played, coached, or held an administrative position for the Bears have been inducted into the Pro Football Hall of Fame. The Bears hold the record for the most individuals enshrined in the Pro Football Hall of Fame.

Of the 41 inductees, 32 made their primary contribution to football with the Bears, while the other nine contributed only a minor portion of their career with the Bears. Of the original 17 individuals inducted in 1963, three spent a majority of their careers with the Chicago Bears. This includes the founder, long time owner, and head coach George Halas, long time halfback and two-way player Bronko Nagurski, and the "Galloping Ghost" Red Grange. The first few years of the Hall of Fame's existence saw 14 Bear players enshrined. Jim Finks was enshrined due to his contributions to the team as a general manager, not a player. Mike Ditka was inducted into the Hall of Fame while serving as the team's head coach. The most recent Bears to be inducted were Devin Hester and Steve McMichael in 2024 (primary contributors) and Jared Allen (minor contributor) in 2025.

== Inductees ==
=== Primary members ===
# ^{§}	Number was retired by the club for contribution with team
†	Major contribution for another team

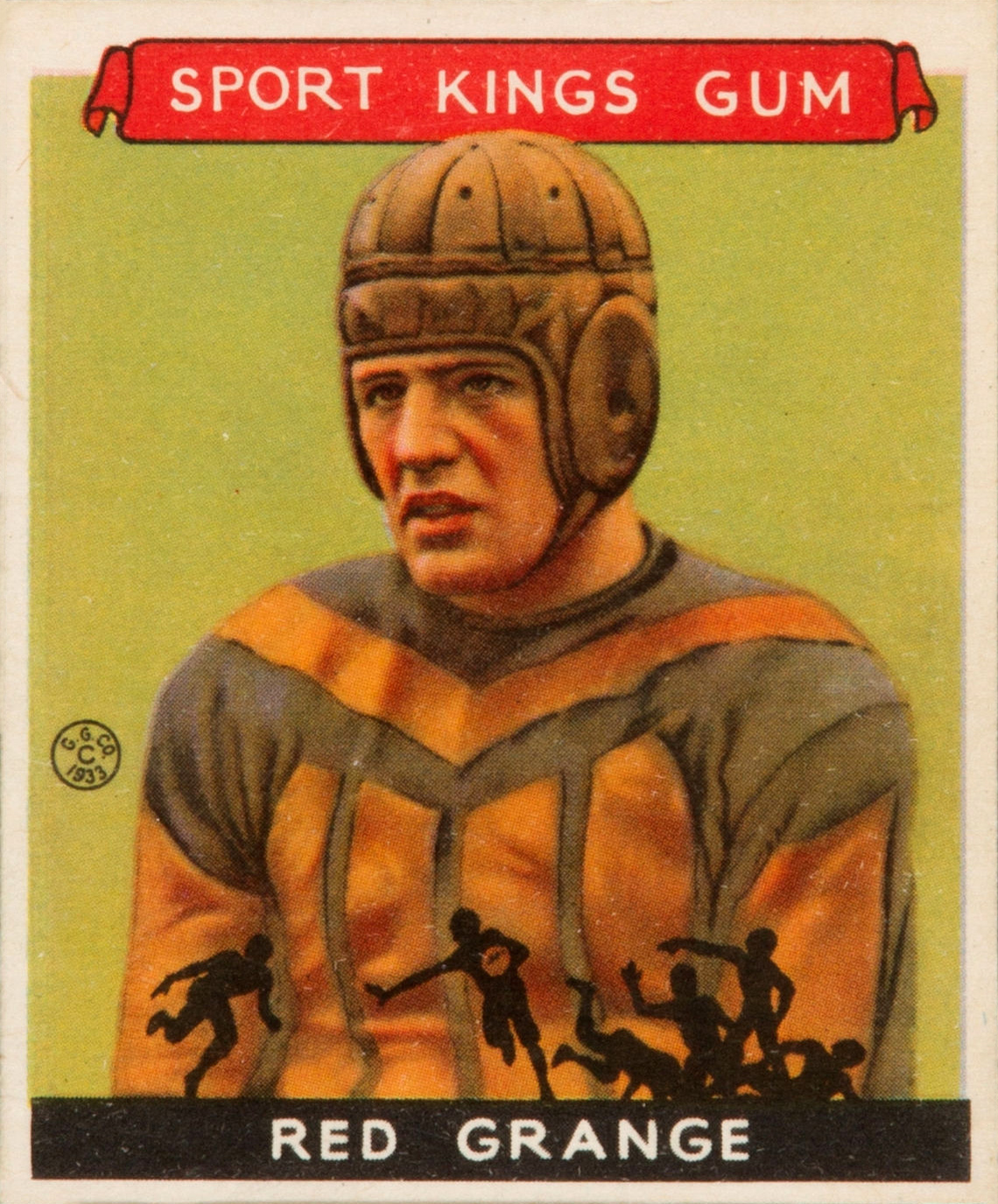
Red Grange, a halfback and corner, had two different tenures with the Bears franchise (1925 and 1929–1934).

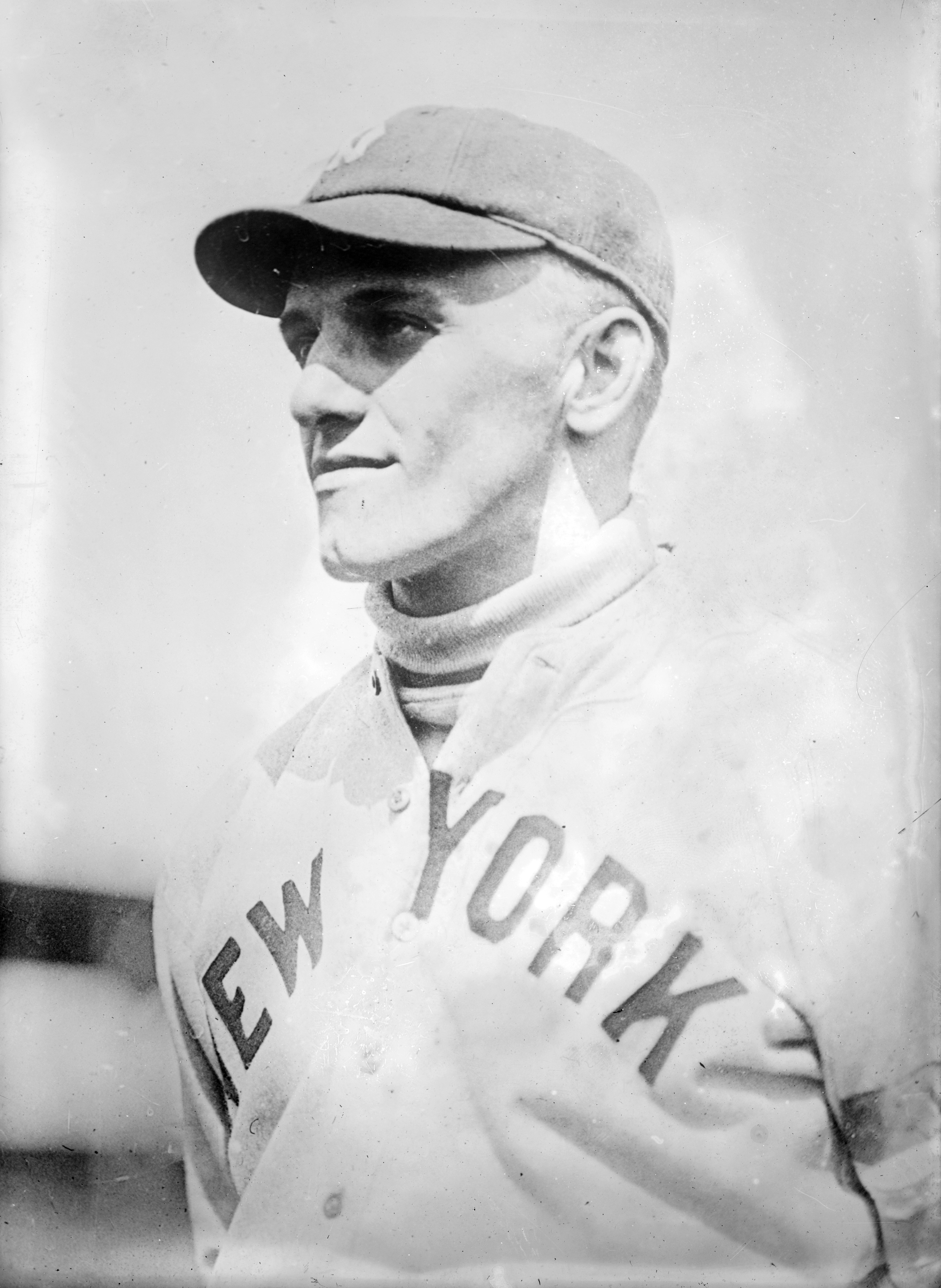
George Halas founded the Bears franchise and played tight end with the team in the early 1920s. Halas owned the team until his death in 1983.

Class	No.^{[a]}	Inductee	Position	Seasons^{[b]}	Notes
1963	7 ^{§}	George Halas	Club founder/Club Owner; Head coach TE/DE	1920–83; 40 seasons 1920–28	
1963	3 ^{§}	Bronko Nagurski	HB/OT/LB	1930–37; 1943	
1963	77 ^{§}	Harold (Red) Grange	HB/CB	1925; 1929–34	
1964	16	Ed Healey	OT/DT	1922–27	
1964	11	William R. Lyman	OT/DT	1926–28; 1930–31; 1933–34	
1964	13	George Trafton	C/DT	1920–21; 1923–32	
1965	1	Paddy Driscoll^{†}	QB/DB/K; Head Coach	1926–29	
1965	21	Dan Fortmann	OG/DT	1936–43	
1965	42 ^{§}	Sid Luckman	QB/CB/P	1939–50	
1966	5 ^{§}	George McAfee	HB/DB	1940–41; 1945–50	
1966	66 ^{§}	Bulldog Turner	C/DT	1940–52	
1967	13	Joe Stydahar	OT/DT	1936–42; 1945–46	
1971	56 ^{§}	Bill Hewitt	TE/DE	1932–36	
1974	61 ^{§}	Bill George	LB	1952–65	
1975	71	George Connor	OT/LB	1948–55	
1977	40 ^{§}	Gale Sayers	HB	1965–71	
1979	51 ^{§}	Dick Butkus	LB	1965–73	
1981	16	George Blanda^{†}	QB/K	1949; 1950–58	
1982	81	Doug Atkins	DE	1955–66	
1982	16	George Musso	OT/G	1933–44	
1988	89 ^{§}	Mike Ditka	TE	1961–66	^{[c]}
1991	78	Stan Jones	OT	1954–65	
1993	34 ^{§}	Walter Payton	HB	1975–87	
1995	--	Jim Finks^{†}	General manager	1974–82	
1998	50	Mike Singletary	LB	1981–92	
2002	99	Dan Hampton	DE/DT	1979–90	
2011	95	Richard Dent	DE	1983–93; 1995	
2018	54	Brian Urlacher	LB	2000–12	
2020	74	Jim Covert	OT	1983–90	
2020	7	Ed Sprinkle	TE/DE	1944–55	
2024	23	Devin Hester	KR/WR	2006–13	
2024	76	Steve McMichael	DT	1981–93	

=== Minor portion of their career with The Bears/Staleys ===
Class	No.	Inductee	Position	Seasons	Primary Team(s)
1964	1/15	Jimmy Conzelman	QB	1920	Chicago Cardinals
1965	13/23	Guy Chamberlin	End/DE	1920–21	Canton Bulldogs
1966	25	Walt Kiesling	OG	1934	Chicago Cardinals
1967	22	Bobby Layne	QB	1948	Detroit Lions
1988	82	Alan Page	DL	1978–81	Minnesota Vikings
2016	76	Orlando Pace	OT	2009	St. Louis Rams
2023	54	Chuck Howley	LB	1958–59	Dallas Cowboys
2024	90	Julius Peppers	DE	2010–13	Carolina Panthers
2025	69	Jared Allen	DE	2014–15	Minnesota Vikings

=== Not listed as a Chicago Bear in Hall of Fame Records ===
Class	No.	Inductee	Position	Seasons	Primary Team(s)
1983	--	Sid Gillman	Offensive Coordinator	1977	San Diego Chargers
2002	--	George Allen	Defensive Coordinator/ Director of player personnel	1958–65	Los Angeles Rams; Washington Redskins
2016	--	Dick Stanfel	Offensive line coach^{[d]}	1981–92	Detroit Lions; Washington Redskins

== Finalists ==
=== Primary members ===
No.	Inductee	Position	Seasons	Years(s)	Notes
-	Clark Shaughnessy	Defensive coordinator	1951–62	1969, 1970, 1975, 1976	
48	Beattie Feathers	HB	1934–37	1970	
28 ^{§}	Willie Galimore	HB	1957–63	1992	Senior committee

=== Minor portion of their career with The Bears/Staleys ===
No.	Inductee	Position	Seasons	Years(s)	Primary Team(s)
67	Abe Gibron	OG^{[e]}	1958–59	1967	Cleveland Browns

== Footnotes ==
- ^{a} The uniform number worn by the player as a member of the Bears.
- ^{b} Only includes the seasons with the Chicago Bears organization.
- ^{c} Ditka was inducted into the Hall of Fame for his service just as a tight end.
- ^{d} Stanfel was inducted into the Hall of Fame for his service just as a player.
- ^{e} Gibron was also the Bears Head coach from 1972–1974.

== See also ==
- History of the Chicago Bears
- Lists of Chicago Bears players
