= List of Chicago Bears starting quarterbacks =

These quarterbacks have started at least one game for the Chicago Bears of the National Football League (NFL).

The early era of the NFL and American football in general was not conducive to passing the football, with the forward pass not being legalized until the early 1900s and not fully adopted for many more years. Although the quarterback position has historically been the one to receive the snap and thus handle the football on every offensive play, the importance of the position during this era was limited by various rules, like having to be five yards behind the line of scrimmage before a forward pass could be attempted. These rules and the tactical focus on rushing the ball limited the importance of the quarterback position while enhancing the value of different types of backs, such as the halfback and the fullback. Some of these backs were considered triple-threat men, capable of rushing, passing or kicking the football, making it common for multiple players to attempt a pass during a game.

As rules changed and the NFL began adopting a more pass-centric approach to offensive football, the importance of the quarterback position grew. Beginning in 1950, total wins and losses by a team's starting quarterback were tracked. Prior to 1950, the Bears had numerous players identified as playing the quarterback position. However, the combination of unreliable statistics in the early era of the NFL and the differences in the early quarterback position make tracking starts by quarterbacks impractical for this timeframe.

== Regular season ==
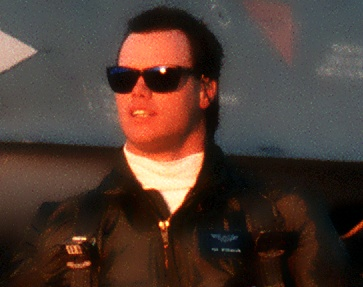
Jim McMahon, who led the Bears to their first Super Bowl in 1985 (1982–1988)

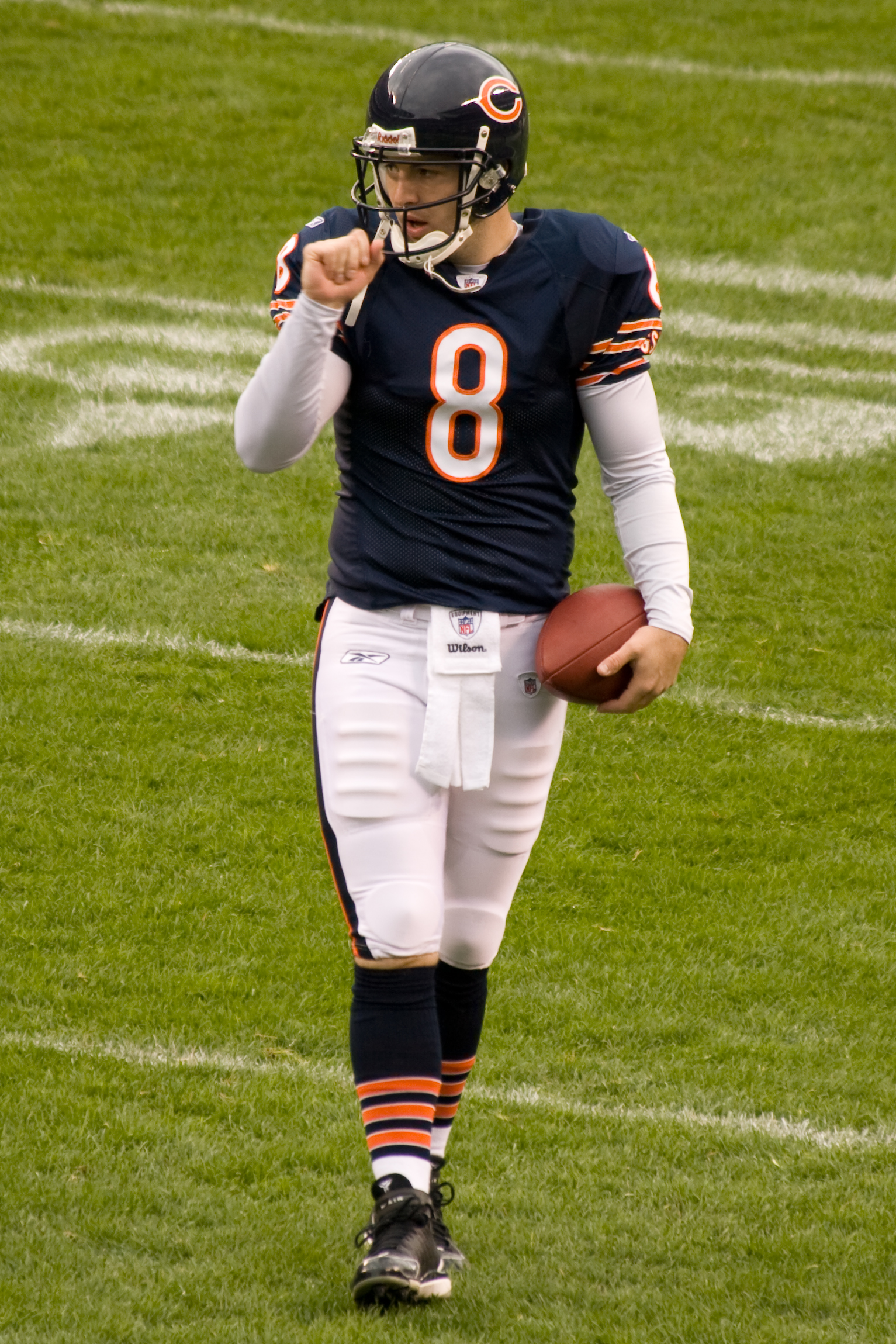
Rex Grossman, who played for the Bears in Super Bowl XLI in 2006 (2003–2008)

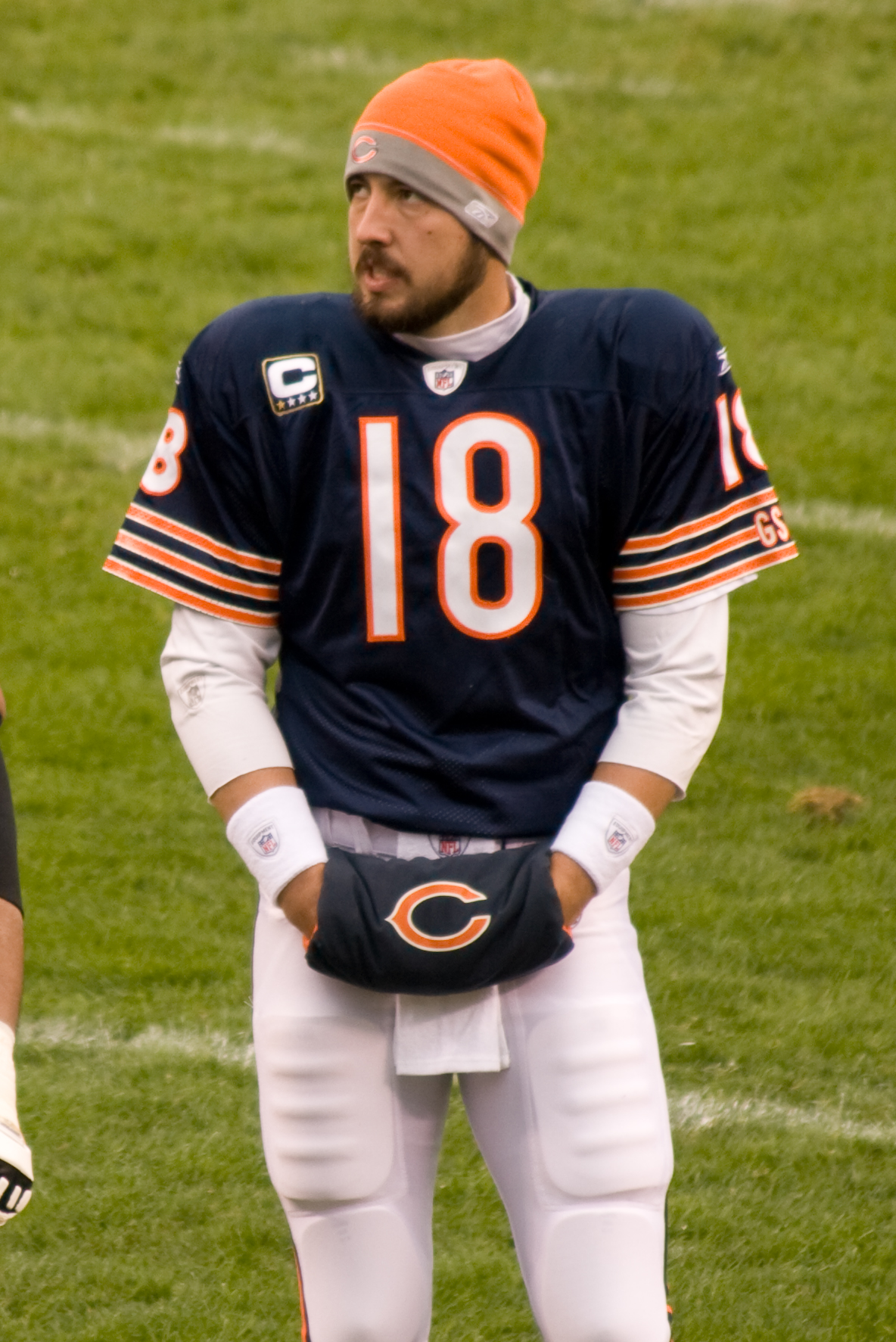
Kyle Orton started 15 games in 2008

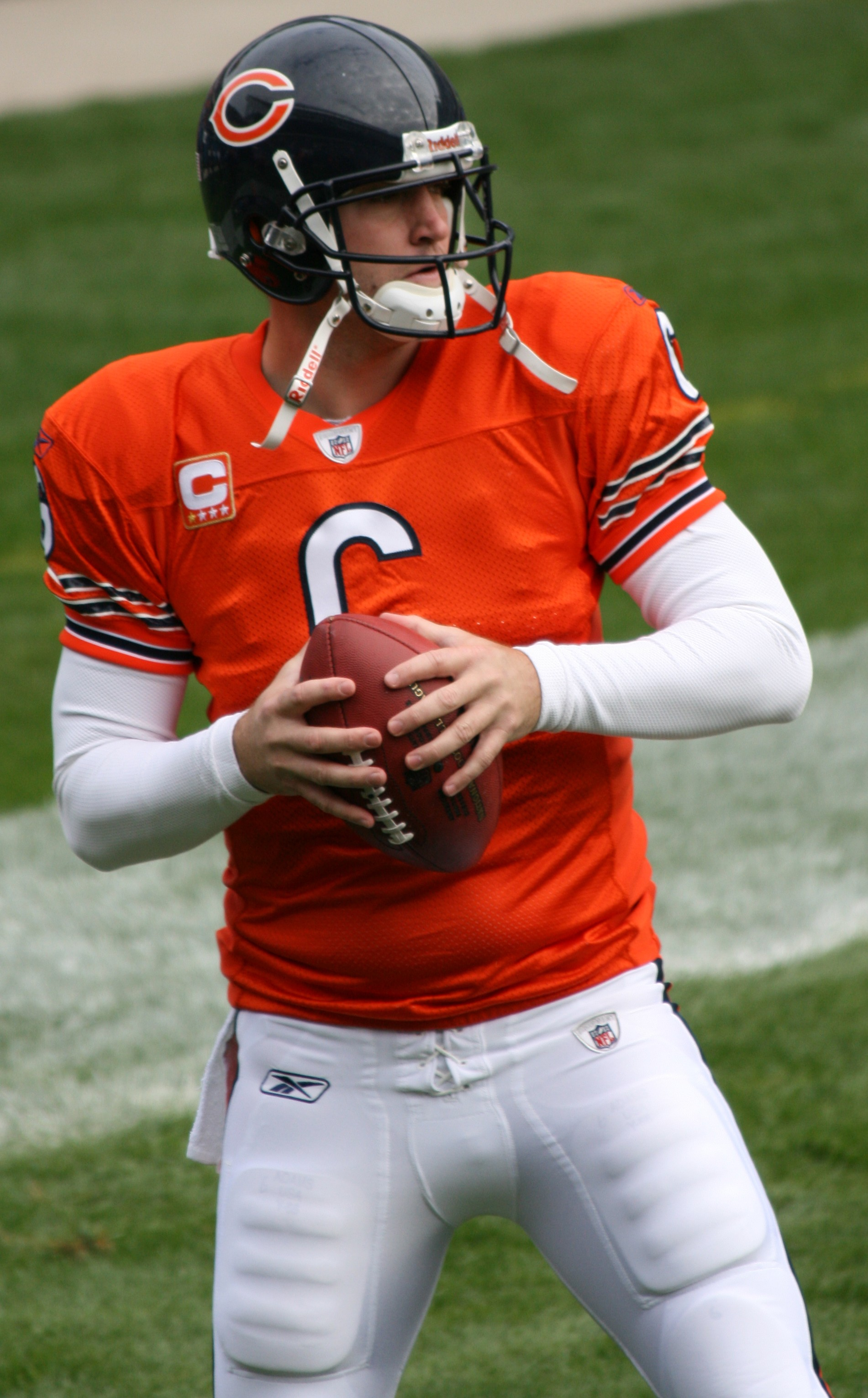
Jay Cutler, who holds multiple Bears franchise passing records (2009–2016)

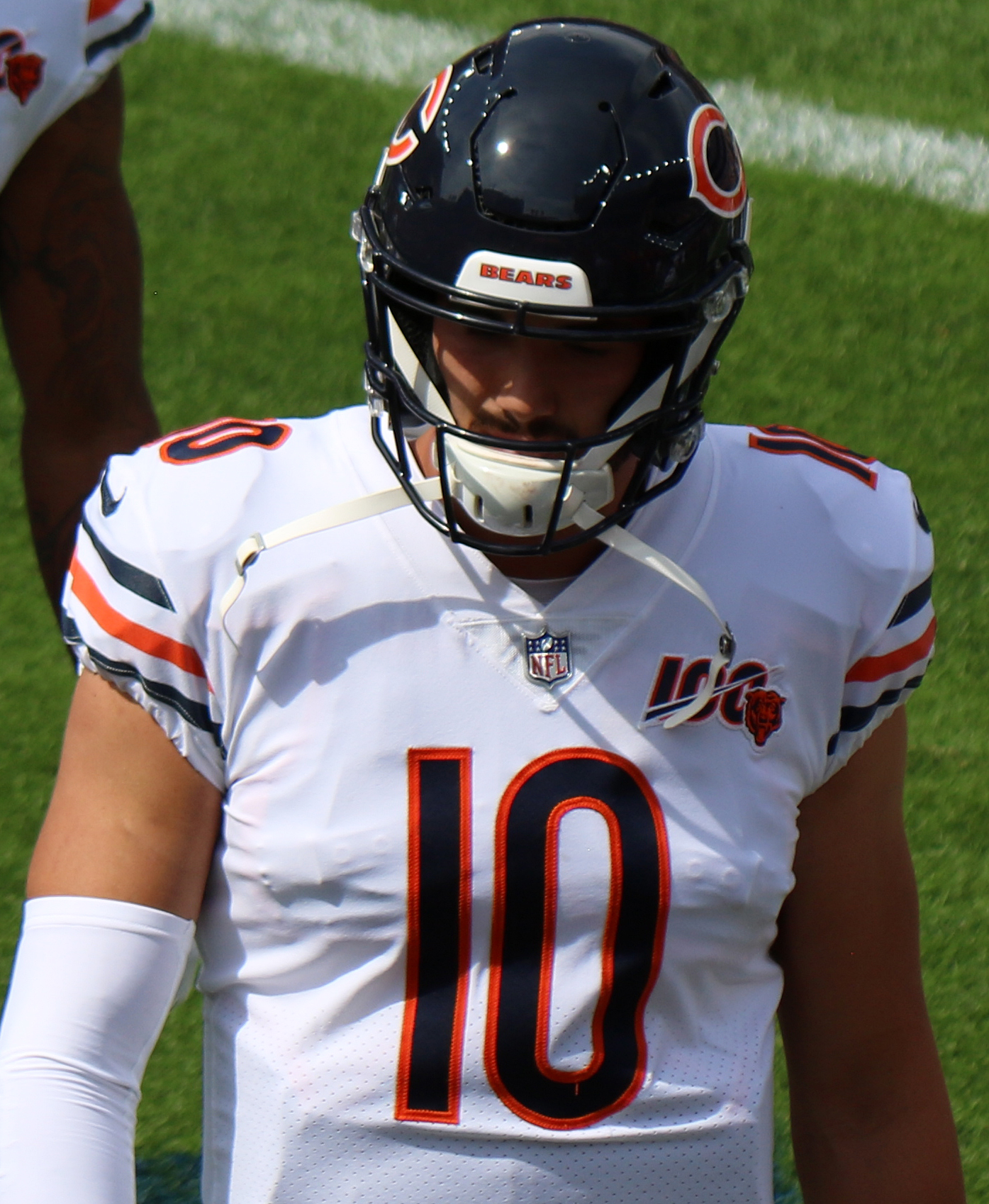
Mitchell Trubisky (2017–2020)

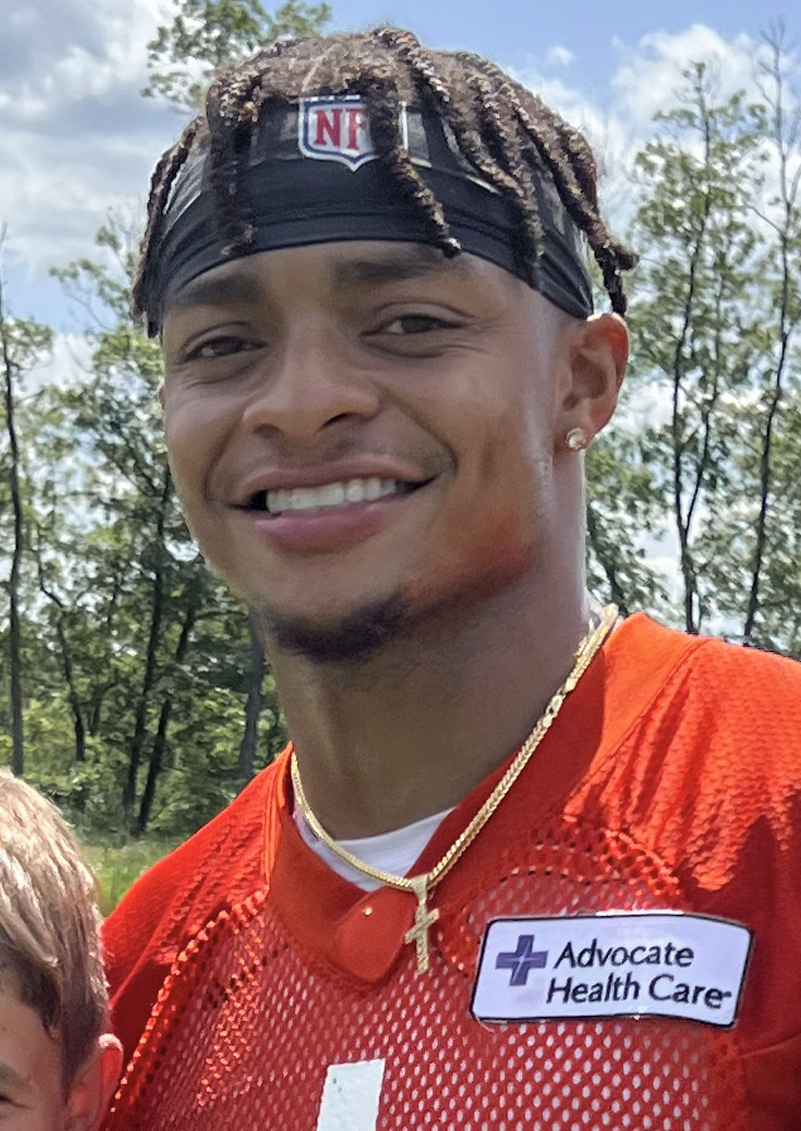
Justin Fields (2021–2023)

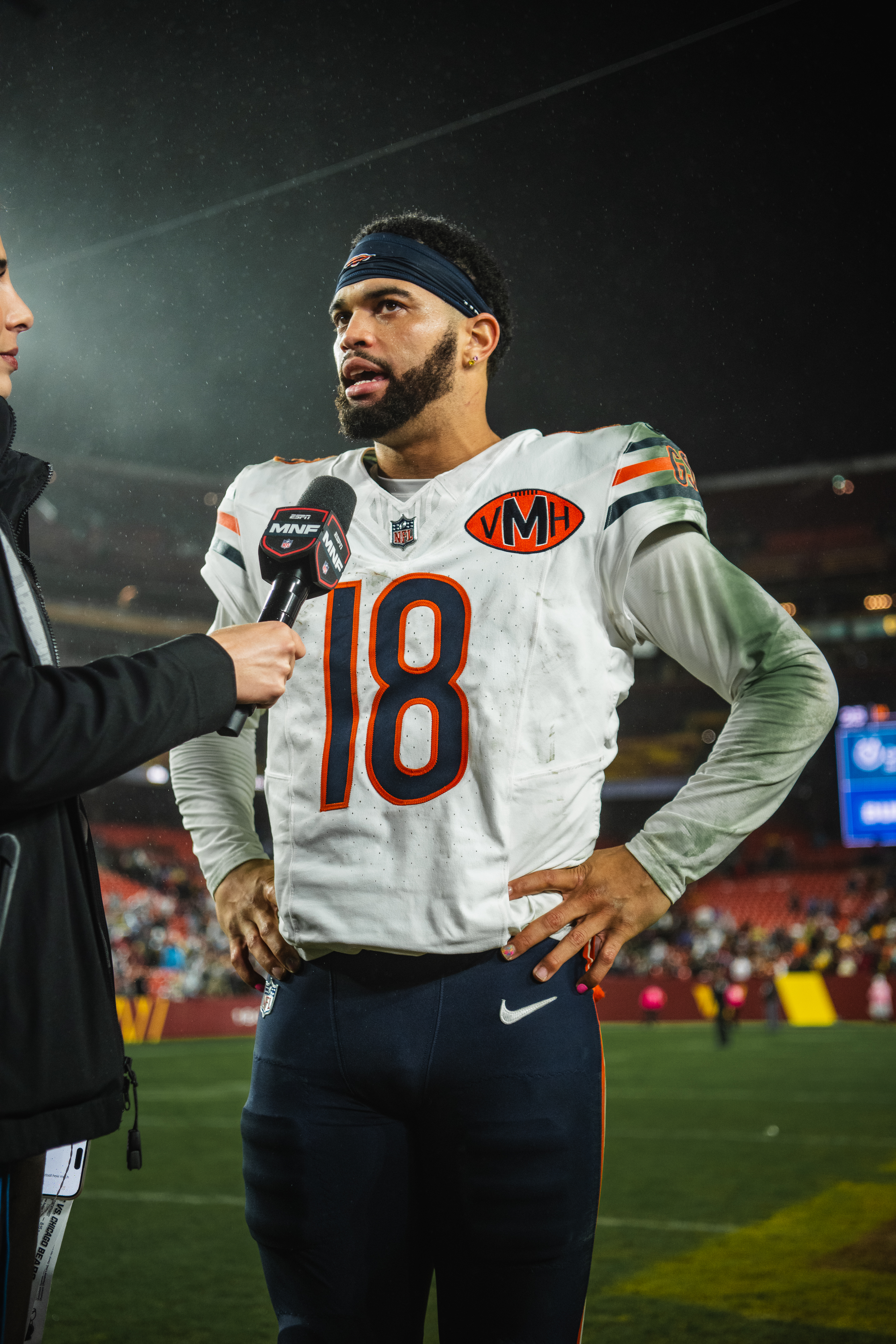
Caleb Williams (2024–present)

Season(s)	Quarterback (games)	References
1950	Johnny Lujack (12)	
1951	Johnny Lujack (6) / Steve Romanik (6)	
1952	Bob Williams (7) / Steve Romanik (3) / George Blanda (2)	
1953	George Blanda (12)	
1954	George Blanda (7) / Zeke Bratkowski (5)	
1955	Ed Brown (12)	
1956	Ed Brown (12)	
1957	Ed Brown (8) / Zeke Bratkowski (4)	
1958	Ed Brown (11) / Zeke Bratkowski (1)	
1959	Ed Brown (10) / Zeke Bratkowski (2)	
1960	Ed Brown (11) / Zeke Bratkowski (1)	
1961	Billy Wade (9) / Ed Brown (5)	
1962	Billy Wade (14)	
1963	Billy Wade (14)	
1964	Billy Wade (10) / Rudy Bukich (4)	
1965	Rudy Bukich (12) / Billy Wade (2)	
1966	Rudy Bukich (14)	
1967	Jack Concannon (12) / Larry Rakestraw (2)	
1968	Jack Concannon (7) / Virgil Carter (5) / Larry Rakestraw (2)	
1969	Bobby Douglass (7) / Jack Concannon (5) / Virgil Carter (2)	
1970	Jack Concannon (13) / Bobby Douglass (1)	
1971	Bobby Douglass (7) / Kent Nix (4) / Jack Concannon (3)	
1972	Bobby Douglass (14)	
1973	Bobby Douglass (12) / Gary Huff (2)	
1974	Gary Huff (11) / Bobby Douglass (3)	
1975	Gary Huff (9) / Bob Avellini (4) / Bobby Douglass (1)	
1976	Bob Avellini (14)	
1977	Bob Avellini (14)	
1978	Bob Avellini (12) / Mike Phipps (4)	
1979	Mike Phipps (10) / Vince Evans (3) / Bob Avellini (3)	
1980	Vince Evans (10) / Mike Phipps (6)	
1981	Vince Evans (16)	
1982	Jim McMahon (7) / Bob Avellini (2)	
1983	Jim McMahon (13) / Vince Evans (3)	
1984	Jim McMahon (9) / Steve Fuller (4) / Rusty Lisch (1) / Bob Avellini (1) / Greg Landry (1)	
1985	Jim McMahon (11) / Steve Fuller (5)	
1986	Mike Tomczak (7) / Jim McMahon (6) / Steve Fuller (2) / Doug Flutie (1)	
1987	Jim McMahon (6) / Mike Tomczak (6) / Mike Hohensee (2) / Steve Bradley (1)	
1988	Jim McMahon (9) / Mike Tomczak (5) / Jim Harbaugh (2)	
1989	Mike Tomczak (11) / Jim Harbaugh (5)	
1990	Jim Harbaugh (14) / Mike Tomczak (2)	
1991	Jim Harbaugh (16)	
1992	Jim Harbaugh (13) / Peter Tom Willis (2) / Will Furrer (1)	
1993	Jim Harbaugh (15) / Peter Tom Willis (1)	
1994	Steve Walsh (11) / Erik Kramer (5)	
1995	Erik Kramer (16)	
1996	Dave Krieg (12) / Erik Kramer (4)	
1997	Erik Kramer (13) / Rick Mirer (3)	
1998	Erik Kramer (8) / Steve Stenstrom (7) / Moses Moreno (1)	
1999	Shane Matthews (7) / Cade McNown (6) / Jim Miller (3)	
2000	Cade McNown (9) / Shane Matthews (5) / Jim Miller (2)	
2001	Jim Miller (13) / Shane Matthews (3)	
2002	Jim Miller (8) / Chris Chandler (7) / Henry Burris (1)	
2003	Kordell Stewart (7) / Chris Chandler (6) / Rex Grossman (3)	
2004	Craig Krenzel (5) / Chad Hutchinson (5) / Jonathan Quinn (3) / Rex Grossman (3)	
2005	Kyle Orton (15) / Rex Grossman (1)	
2006	Rex Grossman (16)	
2007	Rex Grossman (7) / Brian Griese (6) / Kyle Orton (3)	
2008	Kyle Orton (15) / Rex Grossman (1)	
2009	Jay Cutler (16)	
2010	Jay Cutler (15) / Todd Collins (1)	
2011	Jay Cutler (10) / Caleb Hanie (4) / Josh McCown (2)	
2012	Jay Cutler (15) / Jason Campbell (1)	
2013	Jay Cutler (11) / Josh McCown (5)	
2014	Jay Cutler (15) / Jimmy Clausen (1)	
2015	Jay Cutler (15) / Jimmy Clausen (1)	
2016	Matt Barkley (6) / Jay Cutler (5) / Brian Hoyer (5)	
2017	Mitchell Trubisky (12) / Mike Glennon (4)	
2018	Mitchell Trubisky (14) / Chase Daniel (2)	
2019	Mitchell Trubisky (15) / Chase Daniel (1)	
2020	Mitchell Trubisky (9) / Nick Foles (7)	
2021	Justin Fields (10) / Andy Dalton (6) / Nick Foles (1)	
2022	Justin Fields (15) / Trevor Siemian (1) / Nathan Peterman (1)	
2023	Justin Fields (13) / Tyson Bagent (4)	
2024	Caleb Williams (17)	
2025	Caleb Williams (17)	
2026	Caleb Williams (6) / Case Keenum (2) / Tyson Bagent (1)	

== Postseason ==
Season(s)	Quarterback(s)
1950	Johnny Lujack (0–1)
1956	Ed Brown (0–1)
1963	Billy Wade (1–0)
1977	Bob Avellini (0–1)
1979	Mike Phipps (0–1)
1984	Steve Fuller (1–1)
1985	Jim McMahon (3–0)
1986	Doug Flutie (0–1)
1987	Jim McMahon (0–1)
1988	Mike Tomczak (1–0) / Jim McMahon (0–1)
1990	Mike Tomczak (1–1)
1991	Jim Harbaugh (0–1)
1994	Steve Walsh (1–1)
2001	Jim Miller (0–1)
2005	Rex Grossman (0–1)
2006	Rex Grossman (2–1)
2010	Jay Cutler (1–1)
2018	Mitchell Trubisky (0–1)
2020	Mitchell Trubisky (0–1)
2025	Caleb Williams (1–1)

== Most games as starting quarterback ==
These quarterbacks have the most starts for the Bears in regular season games (through the 2023 NFL season)

GP	Games played
GS	Games started
W	Number of wins as starting quarterback
L	Number of losses as starting quarterback
T	Number of ties as starting quarterback
%	Winning percentage as starting quarterback

Name	Period	GP	GS	W	L	T	%
Jay Cutler	2009–2016	102	102	51	51	—	.500
Ed Brown	1955–1961	98	66	39	25	2	.591
Jim Harbaugh	1988–1993	89	65	35	30	—	.538
Sid Luckman*	1939–1949	128	61	—	—	—	—
Jim McMahon	1982–1988	66	61	46	15	—	.754
Mitchell Trubisky	2017–2020	51	50	29	21	—	.580

* – Indicates that the quarterback's career record is unknown

== Team career passing records ==
Through the 2020 NFL season

Name	Comp	Att	%	Yds	TD	Int
Jay Cutler	2,020	3,271	61.8	23,443	154	109
Jim Harbaugh	1,023	1,759	58.2	11,567	50	56
Mitchell Trubisky	1,010	1,577	64.1	10,609	64	37
Erik Kramer	913	1,557	58.6	10,582	63	45
Sid Luckman	904	1,744	51.8	14,686	137	132
Jim McMahon	874	1,513	57.8	11,203	67	56

== See also ==
- Lists of NFL starting quarterbacks
- Lists of Chicago Bears players
