= Lists of Chicago Bears players =

The Chicago Bears are a professional American football team based in Chicago, Illinois. The Bears compete in the National Football League (NFL) as a member of the North Division of the National Football Conference. Initially known as the Decatur Staleys, the football club began as a company team sponsored by the A. E. Staley food starch manufacturer in Decatur, Illinois. After playing independently and securing the Central Illinois Championship in 1919, the company brought in George Halas and Edward "Dutch" Sternaman to manage the team in 1920. That year marked the Decatur Staleys' first official season in the newly established American Professional Football Association, which would later become the NFL in 1922. Halas later purchased and relocated the team to Chicago in 1921. He changed the team's name to the Bears in 1922 as a reference to the Chicago Cubs Major League Baseball team.

Since the franchise's inception in 1919, over 1,500 players have played at least one game for the team. The Bears have retired the uniform numbers of 14 players who led distinguished playing careers with the franchise, the most among any NFL team. Additionally, team also has the highest number of primary enshrined members in the Pro Football Hall of Fame, with 32.

== Current and all-time rosters ==
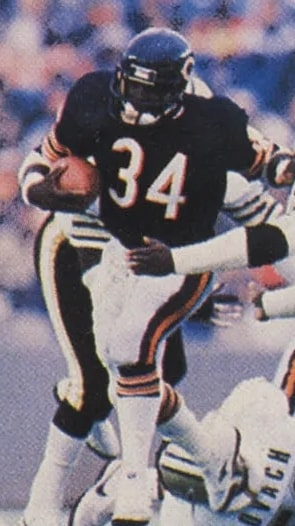
Walter Payton set several franchise and NFL records in rushing during his 13-season career with the Bears.

- Chicago Bears roster – the team's active roster and practice squad.
- Chicago Bears all-time roster (A–K) – the team's all-time roster with last names starting with "A" through "Kla", composed of any player who has participated in at least one regular season or postseason game (preseason games do not apply).
- Chicago Bears all-time roster (L–Z) - the team's all-time roster with last names starting with "Kle" through "Z", composed of any player who has participated in at least one regular season or postseason game (preseason games do not apply).
  - List of Chicago Bears starting quarterbacks – a list of quarterbacks who have started at least one game for the team since 1950.

== Draft choices ==
- List of Chicago Bears first-round draft picks – a list of every first-round draft selection by the team.

== Team recognition ==
- List of Chicago Bears retired numbers – a list of every uniform number retired by the team.
- Top 100 greatest Bears of all-time – a list of the top 100 players in franchise history created for the Bears' centennial anniversary.
- All-Time Team – a team of the greatest players in the history of the franchise, chosen to represent the ultimate Bears lineup.

== League recognition ==
- List of Chicago Bears in the Pro Football Hall of Fame – a list of inductees into the Pro Football Hall of Fame who played for the team.

== See also ==
- Category:Chicago Bears players
- Lists of American football players
