= 1950 Chicago Bears season =

NFL team season

- Owner: George Halas
- Head coach: George Halas
- Home stadium: Wrigley Field

Results
- Record: 9–3
- Conference place: 2nd NFL National
- Playoffs: Lost Conference Playoff (at Rams) 14–24

The 1950 season was the Chicago Bears' 31st in the National Football League. The team matched on their 9–3 record from 1949 under head coach and owner George Halas, tied for first in the National Conference with the Los Angeles Rams, whom they had defeated twice in the regular season. They met in a tiebreaker playoff, won by the Rams, who advanced to the NFL Championship Game.

The Bears traveled by train to Los Angeles for the playoff game.

== Regular season ==
=== Schedule ===
Week	Date	Opponent	Result	Record	Venue	Attendance	Recap
1	September 17	at **Los Angeles Rams**	**W** 24–20	1–0	Los Angeles Memorial Coliseum	21,000	Recap
2	September 24	at **San Francisco 49ers**	**W** 32–20	2–0	Kezar Stadium	35,558	Recap
3	October 1	at **Green Bay Packers**	**L** 21–31	2–1	City Stadium	24,893	Recap
4	October 8	Chicago Cardinals	**W** 27–6	3–1	Wrigley Field	48,025	Recap
5	October 15	**Green Bay Packers**	**W** 28–14	4–1	Wrigley Field	51,065	Recap
6	Bye						
7	October 29	at **New York Yanks**	**L** 27–38	4–2	Yankee Stadium	48,642	Recap
8	November 5	at **Detroit Lions**	**W** 35–21	5–2	Briggs Stadium	32,000	Recap
9	November 12	**New York Yanks**	**W** 28–20	6–2	Wrigley Field	50,102	Recap
10	November 19	**San Francisco 49ers**	**W** 17–0	7–2	Wrigley Field	35,105	Recap
11	November 26	**Los Angeles Rams**	**W** 24–14	8–2	Wrigley Field	43,678	Recap
12	December 3	at Chicago Cardinals	**L** 10–20	8–3	Comiskey Park	31,919	Recap
13	December 10	**Detroit Lions**	**W** 6–3	9–3	Wrigley Field	34,604	Recap
Note: Intra-conference opponents are in **bold** text.

=== Standings ===
NFL National Conference
	W	L	T	PCT	CONF	PF	PA	STK
Los Angeles Rams	9	3	0	.750	9–2	466	309	W1
Chicago Bears	9	3	0	.750	8–2	279	207	W1
New York Yanks	7	5	0	.583	7–4	366	367	W1
Detroit Lions	6	6	0	.500	5–6	321	285	L1
San Francisco 49ers	3	9	0	.250	3–8	213	300	W1
Green Bay Packers	3	9	0	.250	2–9	244	406	L2
Baltimore Colts	1	11	0	.083	1–4	213	462	L5

Note: Tie games were not officially counted in the standings until 1972.

== Playoffs ==
Round	Date	Opponent	Result	Record	Venue	Attendance
Conference	December 17	at Los Angeles Rams	L 14–24	0–1	Los Angeles Memorial Coliseum	83,501

- Unscheduled tiebreaker game for conference title

== Roster ==
Chicago Bears 1950 roster
Quarterbacks: 22 George Blanda K; 42 Sid Luckman; 32 Johnny Lujack K; 12 Steve Romanik; Running backs: 57 J. R. Boone; 39 George Gulyanics P; 29 John Hoffman CB/S; 46 Chuck Hunsinger; 15 Fred Morrison P; 11 Julie Rykovich; Receivers: 20 Jim Keane; 51 Ken Kavanaugh	Linemen: 26 Dick Barwegen G; 41 Alf Bauman DT; 82 Ray Bray G/MG; 81 George Connor T/LB; 24 Fred Davis DT/T; 40 Frank Dempsey DT/LB; 14 Wayne Hansen G; 23 Wash Serini G; 7 Ed Sprinkle DE/WR; 35 Paul Stenn T; 66 Bulldog Turner C; 53 Bill Wightkin DE/WR	Linebackers: 31 Stu Clarkson C; 16 Ed Cody; 18 Fred Negus; 45 Bones Weatherly; Defensive backs: 10 Al Campana CB/RB; 19 Harper Davis CB; 6 Don Kindt S; 5 George McAfee CB/RB; 37 Red O'Quinn S; Rookies in italics
