= Pro Football Hall of Fame =

Professional sports hall of fame in Canton, Ohio, U.S.

- Location in the United States Location in Ohio
- Established: September 7, 1963; 63 years ago
- Location: 2121 George Halas Dr. NW, Canton, Ohio, U.S.
- Coordinates: 40°49′16″N 81°23′52″W
- Type: Professional sports hall of fame
- President: Jim Porter
- Website: profootballhof.com

The Pro Football Hall of Fame is the hall of fame for professional American football, located in Canton, Ohio. Opened on September 7, 1963, the Hall of Fame enshrines exceptional figures in the sport of professional football, including players, coaches, officials, franchise owners, and front-office personnel, almost all of whom made their primary contributions to the game in the National Football League (NFL). However, the Hall of Fame has no official affiliation with the NFL.

As of 2026, there are a total of 387 members of the Hall of Fame. Between four and nine new inductees are normally enshrined every year. For the 2020 class, a 20-person group consisting of five modern-era players and an additional 15 members, known as the "Centennial Slate", were elected to the Hall of Fame to celebrate the 100th anniversary of the NFL.

The Chicago Bears have the most inductees, with 32 (41, including players with a minor portion of their career with the team). Canton is often used as shorthand or metonym for the Hall of Fame.

== History ==
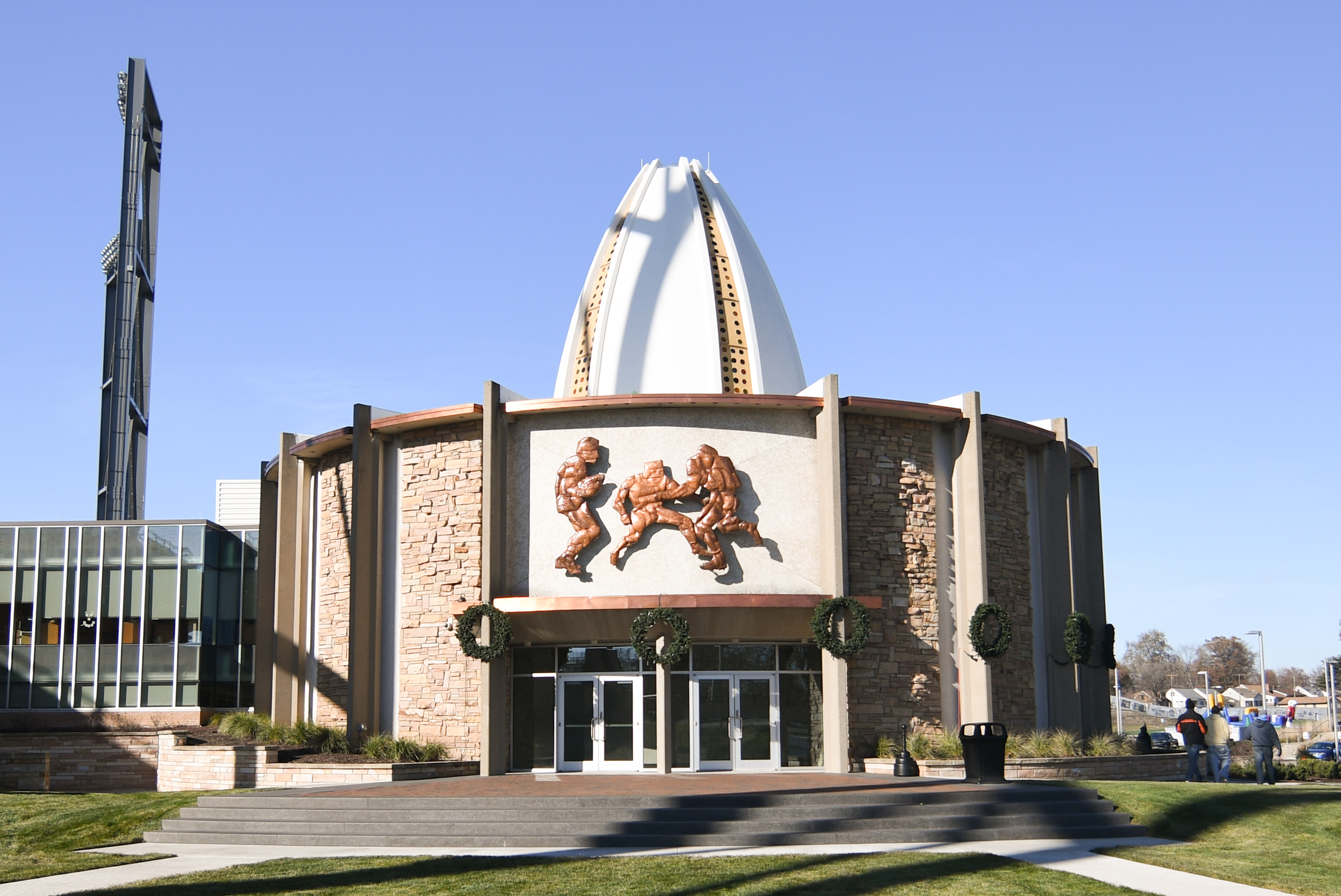
Original entrance to the Pro Football Hall of Fame

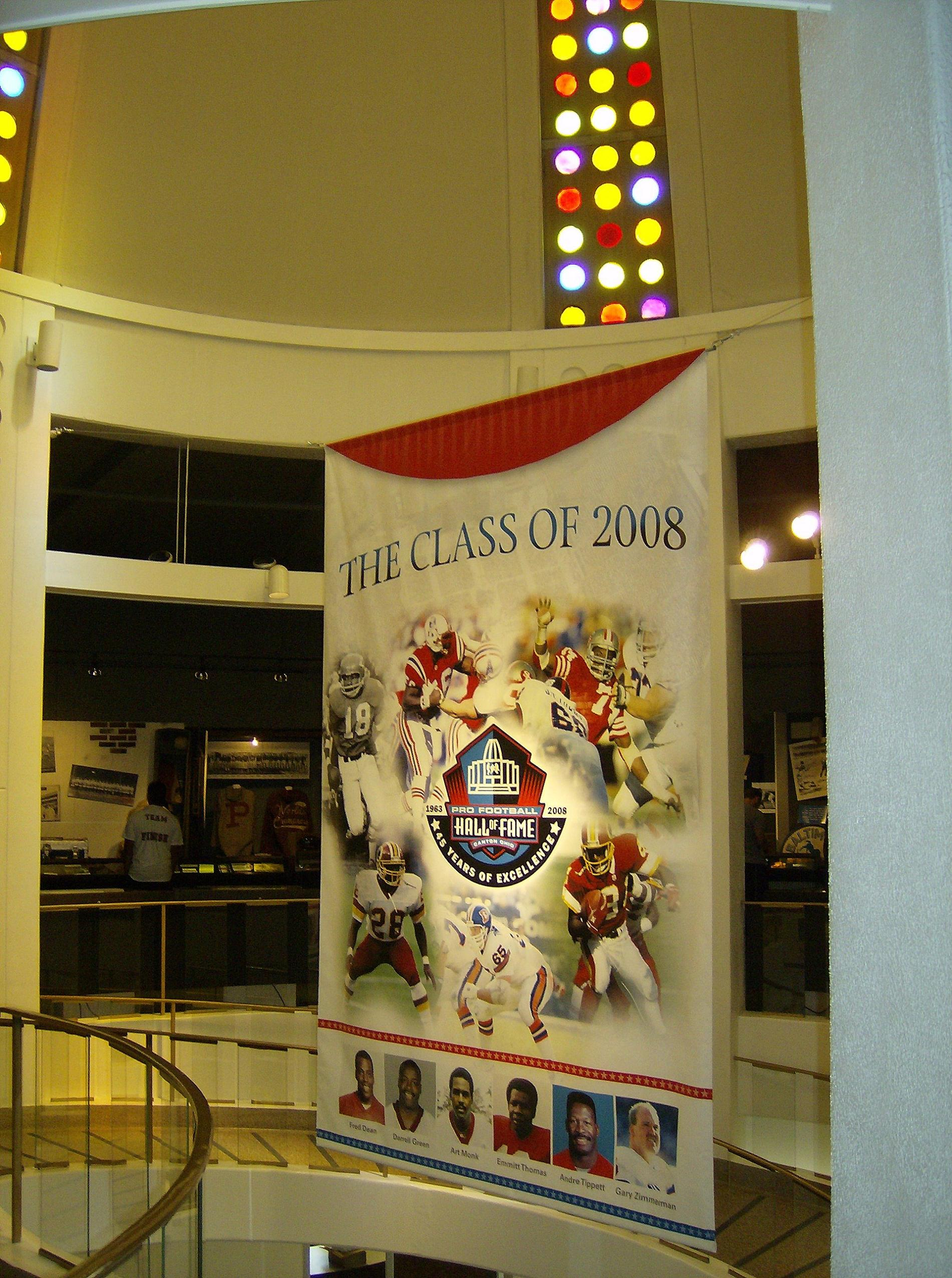
Inside the original structure in 2008

The city of Canton, Ohio, lobbied the NFL to have the Hall of Fame built in Canton, citing three reasons. First, the NFL was founded in Canton on September 17, 1920, (at that time it was known as the American Professional Football Association). Second, the defunct Canton Bulldogs were a successful pro football team and the NFL's first repeat champion (in 1922 and 1923). Third, the Canton community held a fundraising effort that garnered nearly $400,000 (equivalent to $3,255,000 in 2025) to get the Hall of Fame built. NFL commissioner Pete Rozelle also backed the city's pitch.

Four other cities also made bids: Detroit, Michigan; Green Bay, Wisconsin; Latrobe, Pennsylvania; and Los Angeles, California. Detroit offered the Cobo Hall site while Los Angeles proposed placing the Hall of Fame in Exposition Park. Whereas the other cities had NFL teams and Canton was the league's birthplace, Latrobe promoted itself as being where John Brallier played as the first openly professional football player. A committee led by Edwin J. Anderson, Paul Brown, and George Halas reviewed each presentation before the owners voted to award the rights to Canton.

Groundbreaking for the building was held on August 11, 1962, and the Hall of Fame was opened to the public on September 7, 1963.

Designed by Bob Forsythe, the winner of an architecture contest, the original building contained just two rooms and 19,000 square feet (1,800 m^{2}) of interior space. In April 1970, ground was broken for the first of many expansions. This first expansion cost $620,000, and was completed on May 10, 1971. The size was increased to 34,000 square feet (3,200 m^{2}) by adding another room. The pro shop opened with this expansion. This was also an important milestone for the Pro Football Hall of Fame, as yearly attendance passed the 200,000 mark for the first time. This was at least in some part due to the increase in popularity of professional football caused by the advent of the American Football League and its success in the final two AFL-NFL World Championship games.

In November 1977, work began on another expansion project, costing $1,200,000. It was completed in November 1978, enlarging the gift shop and research library, while doubling the size of the theater. The total size of the hall was now 50,500 square feet (4,690 m^{2}), more than 2.5 times the original size.

The building remained largely unchanged until July 1993. The Hall then announced yet another expansion, costing $9,200,000, and adding a fifth room. This expansion was completed on October 1, 1995, and increased the building's size to 82,307 square feet (7,647 m^{2}). The most notable addition was the GameDay Stadium, which shows an NFL Films production on a 20-by-42-foot (6.1 m × 12.8 m) Cinemascope screen.

In 2013, the Hall of Fame completed its largest expansion and renovation to date; the total size of the hall is now 118,000 square feet (11,000 m^{2}).

=== Hall of Fame Village ===
The NFL Hall of Fame Village is a multi-phase, mixed-use development located in Canton, Ohio, designed to enhance the experience of visitors to the Pro Football Hall of Fame. Groundbreaking for the project began in 2016, with the vision of creating a premier destination for football fans and the wider community, combining entertainment, retail, residential, and hospitality spaces. The development is located adjacent to the Hall of Fame itself and aims to celebrate the history of the National Football League while promoting the future of the sport.

The NFL Hall of Fame Village is centered around the Hall of Fame's campus, and its first phase includes a variety of attractions, such as an interactive museum, a large sports and entertainment complex, and a hotel. The village's centerpiece is the Hall of Fame Resort & Entertainment Company, which oversees the development and operation of the various amenities.

Future phases of the development are planned to include more sports venues, a sports medicine facility, an expanded convention center, and residential housing. Additionally, a significant feature of the project is the Tom Benson Hall of Fame Stadium, which serves as the home of the annual Pro Football Hall of Fame Game and other sporting events

In addition to drawing fans and visitors, the NFL Hall of Fame Village is also envisioned as a hub for sports technology, innovation, and education, providing a platform for collaboration among companies and organizations in the sports industry. The ongoing development is expected to create a lasting economic impact on Canton and the surrounding region.

As of 2026 the development remained unfinished.

=== Executive directors or presidents ===
- Dick McCann (April 4, 1962 – November 5, 1967)
- Dick Gallagher (April 1968 – December 31, 1975)
- Pete Elliott (February 1979 – October 31, 1996)
- John Bankert (November 1, 1996 – December 31, 2005)
- Steve Perry (April 24, 2006 – January 2014)
- David Baker (January 6, 2014 – October 16, 2021)
- Jim Porter (2021 – present)

== Inductees ==
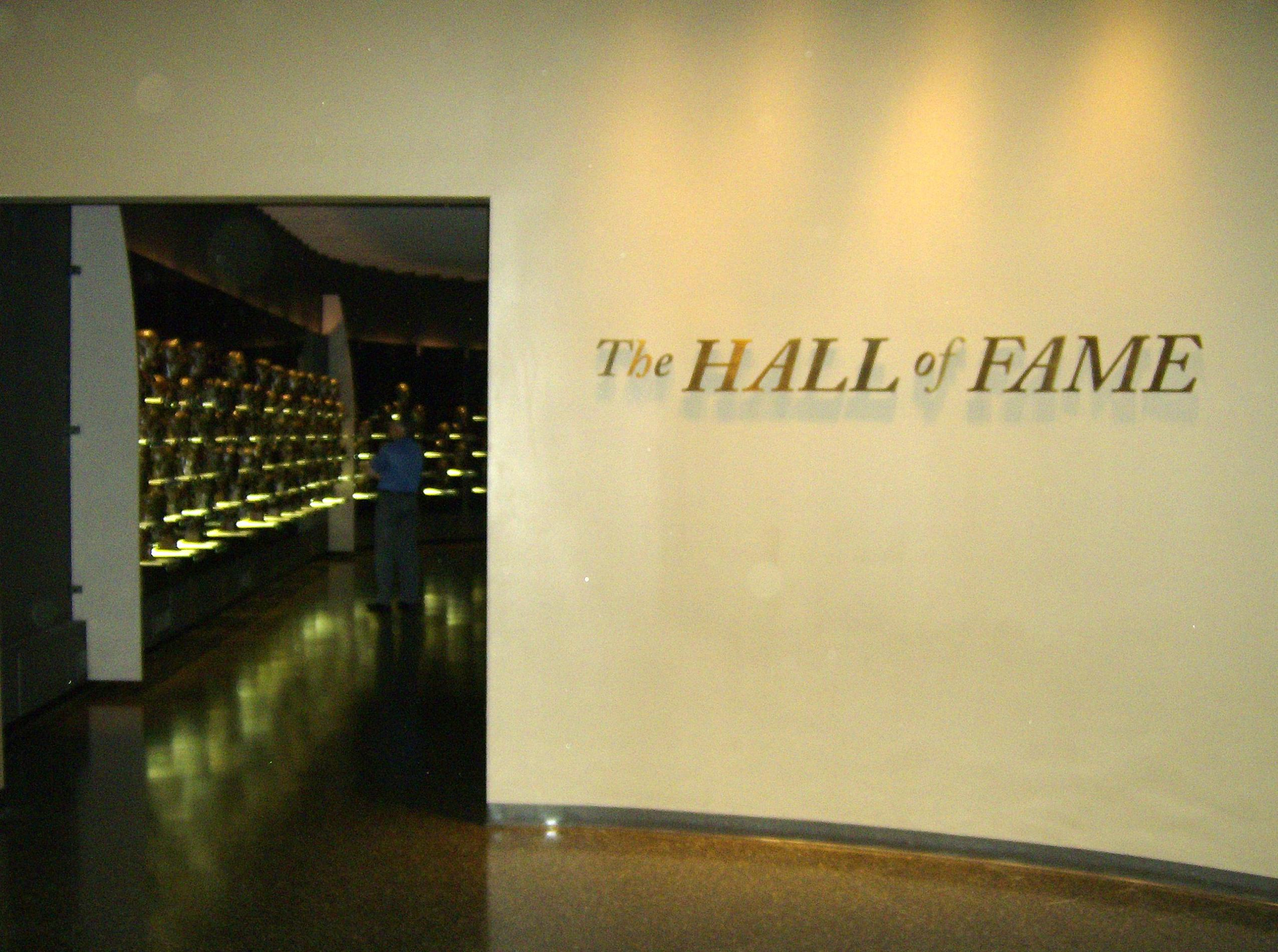
The Hall is made up of several sections with display of the inductees at its heart

As of 2026, all players in the Hall, except Buffalo Bills guard Billy Shaw, played at least some part of their professional career in the NFL; Shaw played his entire career in the American Football League (AFL) prior to the 1970 AFL–NFL merger.

Though several Hall of Famers have had AFL, Canadian Football League (CFL), World Football League (WFL), United States Football League (USFL), Arena Football League (also AFL) and/or Indoor Football League (IFL) experience, and there is a division of the Hall devoted to alternative leagues such as these, to this point no player, coach or contributor have made the Hall without having made significant contributions to either the NFL, AFL, or All-America Football Conference (AAFC).

For CFL stars, there is a corresponding Canadian Football Hall of Fame; only one player, quarterback Warren Moon, and two coaches, Bud Grant and Marv Levy, are enshrined in both halls.

Again for the Arena Football League, there is also a corresponding Arena Football Hall of Fame; similarly, only one player, quarterback Kurt Warner, has been enshrined into both halls. The Indoor Football League, in which wide receiver Terrell Owens played one season, has also established its Hall of Fame.

The Chicago Bears have the most Hall of Famers among the league's franchises with either 40 or 32 enshrinees depending on whether players that only played a small portion of their careers with the team are counted.

=== Selection process ===
==== Selection Committee ====
As of the most recent change to the selection process, announced in September 2026, enshrinees are selected by a 28-person panel officially known as the Selection Committee. Of this group, 25 will vote in a given year. Previously, the Selection Committee consisted of 50 members, largely made up of media members.

Before the 2026 changes, each city with a current NFL team sent one representative from the local media to the committee; a city with more than one franchise sent one representative for each franchise. There were also 17 at-large delegates, plus one representative from the Pro Football Writers Association. The revamped committee continues to have one PFWA representative, but all others are now at-large.

Except for the PFWA representative, who is appointed to a two-year term, all other appointments are open-ended, and terminated only by death, incapacitation, retirement, or resignation.

==== Voting procedure ====
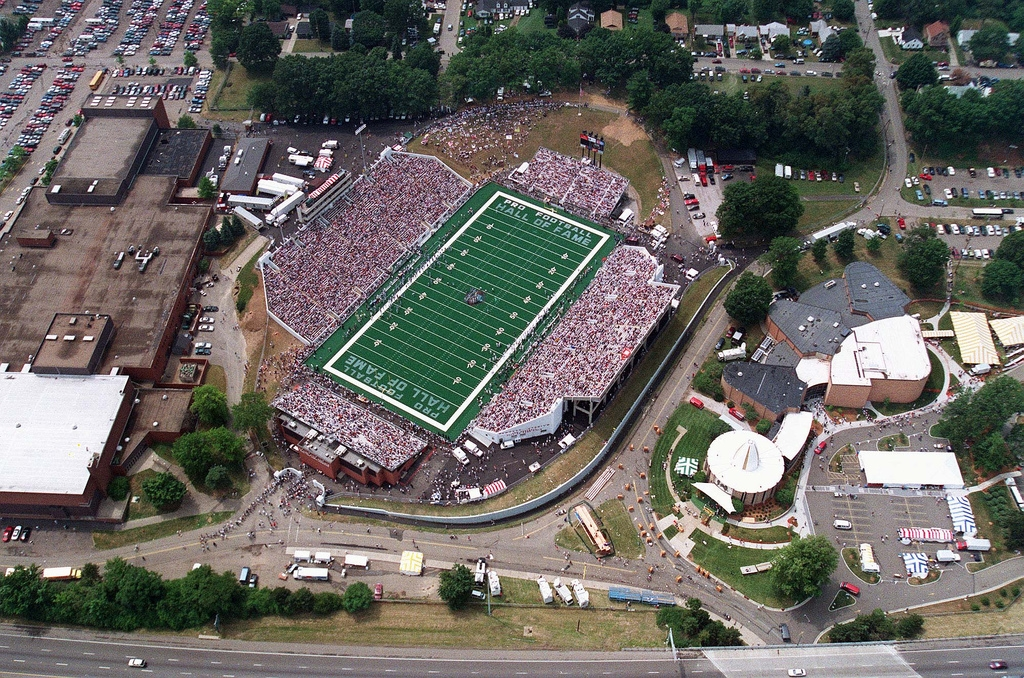
Tom Benson Hall of Fame Stadium with the Hall of Fame in lower right

To be eligible for the nominating process, a player must have been retired for at least five years and coaches for one; any other contributor such as a team owner or executive can be voted in at any time.

Fans may nominate any player, coach or contributor by simply writing via letter or email to the Pro Football Hall of Fame. The Selection Committee is then polled three times by mail (once in March, once in September, and once in October) to eventually narrow the list to 25 semi-finalists. In November, the committee then selects 13 player finalists by mail balloting.

Starting with the 2027 selection process, the Seniors category, consisting of players who completed their careers more than 25 years ago, has been eliminated. All players who have been retired for at least 5 years will be considered in a single pool. The Coaches and Contributors Committees, subcommittees of the overall Selection Committee, nominate coaches and contributors. The Contributors category, previously restricted to individuals who made contributions to the game in areas other than playing or coaching, now allows "consideration of a candidate’s full football résumé that may include playing, coaching and other contributions to the sport". Each subcommittee will advance a single finalist for consideration by the entire Selection Committee.

Previously, a single Seniors and Contributors Committee, subcommittees of the overall Selection Committee, nominated Seniors and Contributors. The Seniors Committee and Contributors Committee added one or two finalist(s) on alternating years, which made a final ballot of 18 finalists under consideration by the full committee each year. Committee members are instructed to only consider a candidate's professional football contributions and to disregard all other factors.

The Selection Committee then meets on "Selection Saturday", the day before each Super Bowl game to elect a new class. To be elected, a finalist must receive at least 80% support from the committee. Starting in 2027, all finalists will be treated as a single pool of candidates, without regard to induction categories. At least four, but no more than nine, candidates are elected annually. Due to COVID-19 issues, the meeting was held remotely throughout the first part of the 2020s; the upcoming 2027 selection meeting will be the first in-person meeting since 2019.

=== 2020 Centennial Slate ===
In 2020, a special Blue-Ribbon Panel selected an additional 15 new members, known as the Centennial Slate, to be inducted into the Hall of Fame to celebrate the 100th anniversary of the NFL. Among these 15 members, ten would be seniors. On January 11, during the weekend of the NFL divisional playoffs, Hall of Fame president David Baker went on the set of The NFL Today to personally tell coach Bill Cowher, who was working as an analyst on that pregame show, that he was selected as one of the members of the Centennial Slate.

One day later, Baker went on the set of Fox NFL Sunday to inform coach Jimmy Johnson, working as an analyst on Fox's studio show, that he was also selected. The rest of the Centennial Slate members were revealed on January 15.

The remaining 13 members of the Centennial Slate elected to the Hall of Fame in 2020 were: wide receiver Harold Carmichael, offensive tackle Jim Covert, free safety Bobby Dillon, free safety Cliff Harris, offensive tackle Winston Hill, defensive tackle Alex Karras, strong safety Donnie Shell, tackle Duke Slater, end Mac Speedie and defensive end Ed Sprinkle, alongside contributors, president and co-founder of NFL Films Steve Sabol, general manager George Young and former NFL commissioner Paul Tagliabue.

They were enshrined in 2021 due to COVID-19 pandemic, but are still considered part of the Centennial Class of 2020.

=== Enshrinement ceremony ===
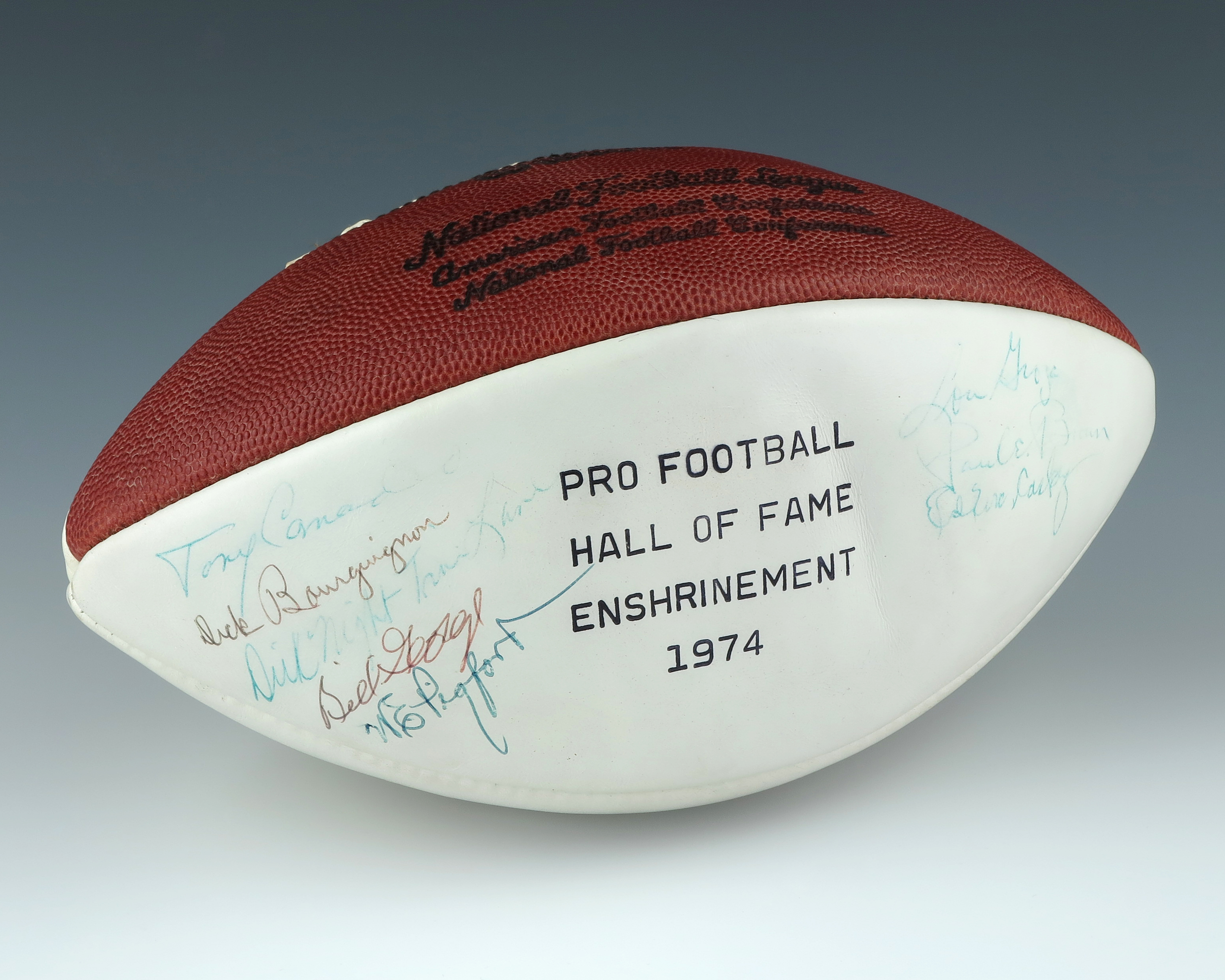
A football signed by the 1974 Pro Football Hall of Fame enshrinement class

The enshrinement ceremony is the main event of the annual Enshrinement Week Powered by Johnson Controls that kicks off every NFL season. The celebration is held in Canton, throughout the week surrounding the enshrinement ceremony. All members of the Hall of Fame are invited to attend the annual ceremony.

Enshrinees do not go into the Pro Football Hall of Fame as a member of a certain team. Rather, all of an enshrinee's affiliations are listed equally. While the Baseball Hall of Fame plaques generally depict each of their inductees wearing a particular club's cap (with a few exceptions, such as Catfish Hunter and Greg Maddux), the bust sculptures of each Pro Football Hall of Fame inductee make no reference to any specific team. In addition to the bust that goes on permanent display at the Hall of Fame, inductees receive a distinctive Gold Jacket, and previous inductees nearly always wear theirs when participating at the new inductee ceremonies.

Previous induction ceremonies were held during the next day (Sunday from 1999 to 2005, Saturday in 2006), situated on the steps of the Hall of Fame building.

Starting in 2002, the ceremony was moved to Fawcett Stadium (now Tom Benson Hall of Fame Stadium), where it was held from 1963 to 1965. Since 2007, the enshrinement ceremony has been held on the Saturday night, since 2017 two days after the Hall of Fame Game. In 2022, the ceremony was moved to noon ET.

== Hall of Fame Game ==
The Hall of Fame Game, the annual NFL preseason opener, is played in Tom Benson Hall of Fame Stadium at Hall of Fame Village in Canton, Ohio. In 2017, the Hall of Fame Game was held for the first time on Thursday night. The preseason classic kicks off Enshrinement Week and marks the start of the NFL preseason.

== Black College Football Hall of Fame ==
The Pro Football Hall of Fame museum includes a permanent exhibit recognizing the inductees of the Black College Football Hall of Fame. The two organizations partnered in 2016, also creating the Black College Football Hall of Fame Classic played at Tom Benson Hall of Fame Stadium.

== Ralph Hay Pioneer Award ==
The Ralph Hay Pioneer Award is an American football award given by the Pro Football Hall of Fame periodically to an individual who has made significant and innovative contributions to professional football. The award is named after Canton Bulldogs owner and National Football League founder and chief organizer Ralph Hay. It was originally called the Daniel F. Reeves Pioneer Award, named after Los Angeles Rams owner and hall of fame inductee Dan Reeves. The award is the highest and the most prestigious honor given by the Pro Football Hall of Fame, other than enshrinement. As of 2026, Steve Sabol, Art McNally, Marion Motley and Bill Willis are the only people to receive the award and also become a Hall of Fame inductee.

=== Honorees ===
Elected to the Pro Football Hall of Fame

Year	Recipient	Notability	Note(s)
1972	Fred Gehrke	Designer of the first football helmet logo	
1975	Arch Ward	Founder of the Chicago College All-Star Game and All-America Football Conference	
1986	John Facenda	Voice of NFL Films	Awarded the Pete Rozelle Radio-Television Award in 2021
1992	David Boss	Photographer, artist, and logo designer	
2001	George Toma	Groundskeeper at Arrowhead Stadium	
2004	City of Pottsville, Pennsylvania	Birthplace of the Anthracite League and Pottsville Maroons	
2007	Steve Sabol	Co-founder of NFL Films	Inducted to the Hall of Fame as a contributor in 2020
2012	Art McNally	Supervisor of officials for the NFL and World League, 1968–95	Inducted to the Hall of Fame as a contributor in 2022
2016	Joe Browne	50-year employee of the NFL central office	
2022	Marion Motley	Reintegrated professional football in 1946	Inducted to the Hall of Fame 1968
2022	Woody Strode	Reintegrated professional football in 1946	
2022	Kenny Washington	Reintegrated professional football in 1946	
2022	Bill Willis	Reintegrated professional football in 1946	Inducted to the Hall of Fame in 1977

== Criticism ==
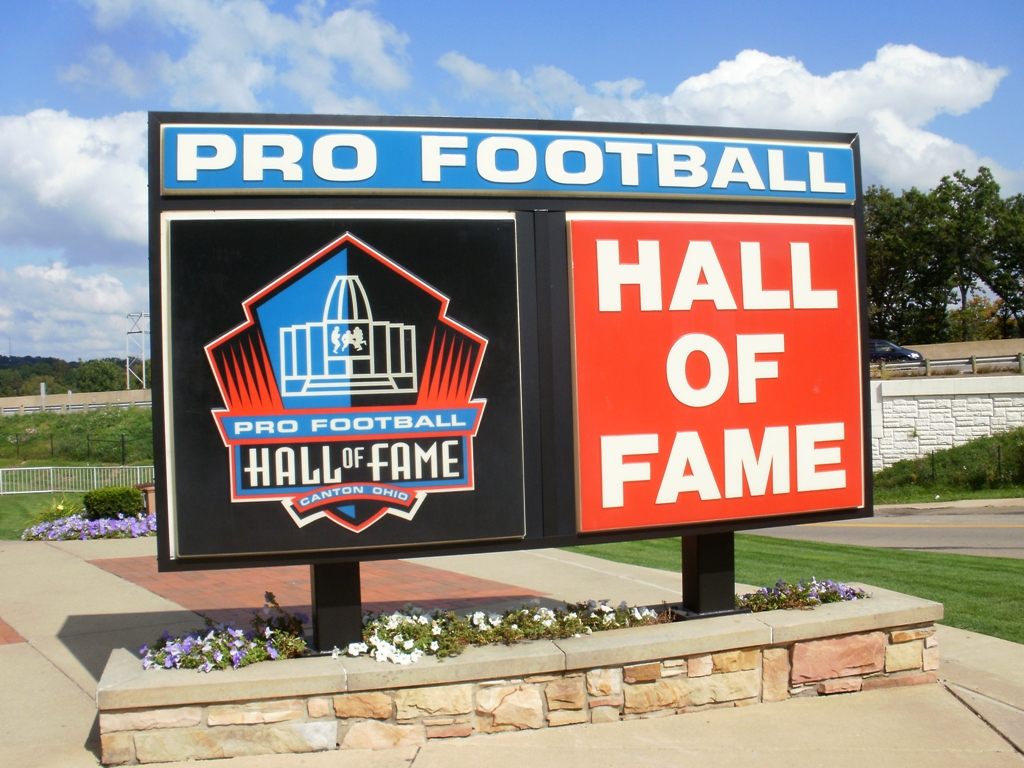
Sign at the old entrance to the Pro Football Hall of Fame

The small number of candidates elected each year has helped foster what some perceive as an inequality of representation at certain positions or in certain categories of player, to the exclusion of defensive players in general (defensive backs and outside linebackers in particular), special teams players, wide receivers, and those from the "seniors" category (which was folded into a single "players" category after 2026). There has also been criticism that deserving players have been overlooked because they played most or all of their careers on poor teams.

In 2009, a New York Times article criticized the Hall for not including punter Ray Guy on its ballot. Guy was eventually inducted as part of the 2014 class for the Hall of Fame.

The Pro Football Hall of Fame is unique among North American major league sports halls of fame in that officials have been generally excluded. Only two figures, both inducted for their work as supervisor or director of officiating as opposed to game officiating—1966 inductee Hugh "Shorty" Ray and 2022 inductee Art McNally—have been enshrined; McNally is the only inductee in the Hall to have experience as an in-game official. The National Baseball Hall of Fame and Museum, Naismith Basketball Hall of Fame and Hockey Hall of Fame have each inducted game officials as members.

Another prominent absence from the Hall is sports journalist and broadcaster Howard Cosell, who has yet to either be awarded the Pete Rozelle Radio-Television Award or even get fully inducted despite his well-known association with Monday Night Football; an August 2010 Sports Illustrated article hints that Cosell may have even been "blacklisted" by the NFL.

As the late 2010s approached, a number of controversial and polarizing figures began to reach eligibility for the Hall. For example, Darren Sharper's career achievements make him a candidate for the Hall, but there is debate over whether he should be inducted due to his conviction on multiple rape and drug distribution charges after he retired. Official guidelines state that off-the-field character issues are not allowed to influence the selection process and have not affected the ability of figures such as O. J. Simpson and Lawrence Taylor to remain enshrined in the Hall.

Terrell Owens' exclusion from the Hall in his first two years of eligibility despite his strong individual statistics was a subject of public debate: while Owens was elected to the Hall of Fame in 2018, he refused to attend the enshrinement ceremony.

In 2026, significant controversy ensued when it was reported that coach Bill Belichick was not inducted into the Hall in his first year of eligibility. Belichick, a six-time Super Bowl champion as a head coach and the holder of several other records, is considered one of the greatest coaches in NFL history. However, analysts cited Belichick's alleged involvement in the Spygate and Deflategate scandals as possible reasons for exclusion.

Another factor cited in the Belichick snub was related to the then-current selection process. The Coaches, Contributors, and Seniors finalists were considered as part of a single pool separate from the group of modern-era players, with committee members allowed to vote for a maximum of three individuals from the smaller pool. One voter, Vahe Gregorian of The Kansas City Star, publicly stated that he voted for the three seniors due to these rules:

...I felt duty-bound to vote for the richly deserving seniors, who most likely won't ever have a hearing again as more senior candidates enter the pool and fresh cases get made for others. Meanwhile, Belichick is inevitable soon ... as he should be. . . . I felt more compelled by what I perceive to be last chances and looming lost causes within the system as we have it — a system I hope the Hall will see fit to change now.

== See also ==
- List of Pro Football Hall of Fame inductees
- Arena Football Hall of Fame
- Canadian Football Hall of Fame
- College Football Hall of Fame
- Indoor Football League Hall of Fame
