= Larry Coutre =

American football player (1928–2008)

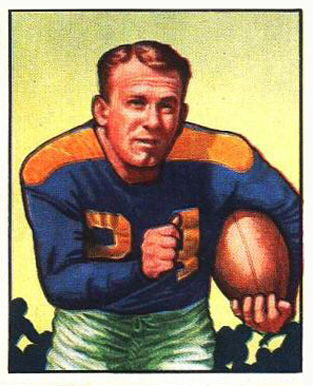

No. 27, 24
- Position: Halfback

Personal information
- Born: April 11, 1928; Chicago, Illinois, U.S.
- Died: May 19, 2008 (aged 80); Boca Raton, Florida, U.S.
- Listed height: 5 ft 10 in (1.78 m)
- Listed weight: 175 lb (79 kg)

Career information
- High school: St. George (Illinois)
- College: Notre Dame
- NFL draft: 1950: 4th round, 43rd overall pick

Career history
- Green Bay Packers (1950, 1953); Baltimore Colts (1953)

Awards and highlights
- 3× National champion (1946, 1947, 1949)

Career NFL statistics
- Rushing yards: 322
- Rushing average: 5.1
- Receptions: 18
- Receiving yards: 202
- Total touchdowns: 3
- Stats at Pro Football Reference

Lawrence Edward Coutre (April 11, 1928 – May 19, 2008) was a halfback in the National Football League (NFL).

== Biography ==
Coutre was born on April 11, 1928, in Chicago.

Coutre died May 19, 2008, due to a heart aneurysm in Boca Raton, Florida.

== Career ==
Coutre was drafted by the Green Bay Packers in the fourth round of the 1950 NFL draft and played that season with the team. After two seasons away from the NFL, he would split the 1953 NFL season between the Packers and the Baltimore Colts.

He played at the collegiate level at the University of Notre Dame.

He was also in the FBI and served papers to lawyers.
