= Ray DiPierro =

American football player (1926–2014)

Profile
- Position: Guard

Personal information
- Born: August 22, 1926; Toledo, Ohio
- Died: July 20, 2014 (aged 87); Perrysburg, Ohio
- Listed height: 5 ft 11 in (1.80 m)
- Listed weight: 210 lb (95 kg)

Career information
- High school: Libbey High School
- College: Ohio State University

Career history
- Green Bay Packers (1950–1951)
- Stats at Pro Football Reference

Ray DiPierro (1926–2014) was a guard in the National Football League.

DiPierro was born Ramon Frank DiPierro on August 22, 1926, in Toledo, Ohio. He played with the Green Bay Packers for two seasons. He played at the collegiate level at Ohio State University.

DiPierro died on July 20, 2014, in a long-term care facility in Perrysburg, Ohio, from the complications of Alzheimer's and Parkinson's diseases. He was 87.
