= Al Campana =

American football player (1926–2009)

Profile
- Position: Running back

Personal information
- Born: February 25, 1926; Hubbard, Ohio, U.S.
- Died: April 7, 2009 (aged 83)

Career information
- College: Youngstown State University

Career history
- 1950–1952: Chicago Bears
- 1953: Chicago Cardinals
- Stats at Pro Football Reference

Al Campana (1926–2009) was an American professional football player who played running back for four seasons for the Chicago Bears and Chicago Cardinals.
