= 1948 Los Angeles Rams season =

NFL team season

- Head coach: Clark Shaughnessy
- Home stadium: Los Angeles Memorial Coliseum

Results
- Record: 6–5–1
- Division place: 3rd NFL Western
- Playoffs: Did not qualify

The 1948 Los Angeles Rams season was the team's 11th year with the National Football League and the third season in Los Angeles. The Rams debuted the first helmet logo in league history in 1948, an idea that was conceived by running back Fred Gehrke. The season opener against the Lions was the final Wednesday night game in the NFL until a 2012 Wednesday game between the Cowboys and Giants. In his first NFL game, future Pro Football Hall of Famer Tom Fears scored twice in the fourth quarter, and had his only pick-six of his career in a 44–7 victory.

== Draft ==
1948 Los Angeles Rams draft
Round	Pick	Player	Position	College	Notes
3	18	Tom Keane *	DB	West Virginia	
5	30	Bruce Bailey	B	Virginia	
6	40	George Grimes	DB	Virginia	
7	49	Gene Ruszkowski	T	Ohio	
7	50	Noel Cudd	T	West Texas State	
8	60	Bob Walker	B	Colorado Mines	
9	70	Mike Graham	B	Cincinnati	Played with Los Angeles Dons (AAFC)
10	80	Glenn Johnson	T	Arizona State	Played with New York Yankees (AAFC)
11	90	Johnny Zisch	E	Colorado	
12	100	Atherton (Pinky) Phleger	T	Stanford	
13	110	Bob Heck	DE	Purdue	
14	120	Bill Schroll	LB	LSU	
15	130	Bob DeMent	T	Mississippi Southern	
16	140	Charley Schoenherr	B	Wheaton	
17	150	Larry Brink *	DE	Northern Illinois State	
18	160	Bill O'Connor	E	Notre Dame	Played with Buffalo Bills (AAFC)
19	170	Bill Nelson	B	Montana State	
20	180	Jim Rees	T	NC State	
21	190	Ray Borneman	B	Texas	
22	200	Ray Yagiello	G	Catawba	
23	210	John Pesek	E	Nebraska	
24	220	Charlie DeAutremont	B	Southern Oregon	
25	230	Bob Levenhagen	G	Washington	
26	240	Leon Cooper	T	Hardin–Simmons	
27	250	Jim Wade	HB	Oklahoma City	
28	260	Ken Sinofsky	G	Nevada	
29	270	Bobby Jack Stuart	B	Tulsa	
30	280	Hilliard (Junior) Crum	E	Arizona	
31	288	Tony Kunkiewicz	B	Trinity (CT)	
32	295	Bill Taylor	E	Rice	
Made roster * Made at least one Pro Bowl during career

== Schedule ==
Game	Date	Opponent	Result	Record	Venue	Attendance	Recap	Sources
1	September 22	**Detroit Lions**	**W** 44–7	1–0	L.A. Memorial Coliseum	12,941	Recap	
2	October 3	Philadelphia Eagles	**T** 28–28	1–0–1	L.A. Memorial Coliseum	36,884	Recap	
3	October 10	at **Chicago Bears**	**L** 21–42	1–1–1	Wrigley Field	43,707	Recap	
4	October 17	**Green Bay Packers**	**W** 24–10	2–1–1	L.A. Memorial Coliseum	25,119	Recap	
5	October 24	at **Detroit Lions**	**W** 34–27	3–1–1	Briggs Stadium	17,444	Recap	
6	October 31	**Chicago Cardinals**	**L** 22–27	3–2–1	L.A. Memorial Coliseum	32,149	Recap	
7	November 7	**Chicago Bears**	**L** 6–21	3–3–1	L.A. Memorial Coliseum	56,263	Recap	
8	November 14	at New York Giants	**W** 52–37	4–3–1	Polo Grounds	22,766	Recap	
9	November 21	at **Chicago Cardinals**	**L** 24–27	4–4–1	Comiskey Park	29,031	Recap	
10	November 28	at **Green Bay Packers**	**L** 16–0	4–5–1	City Stadium	23,874	Recap	
11	December 5	at Washington Redskins	**W** 41–13	5–5–1	Griffith Stadium	32,970	Recap	
12	December 12	Pittsburgh Steelers	**W** 31–14	6–5–1	L.A. Memorial Coliseum	27,967	Recap	
Note: Intra-division opponents are in **bold** text.

== Standings ==
NFL Western Division
	W	L	T	PCT	DIV	PF	PA	STK
Chicago Cardinals	11	1	0	.917	7–1	395	226	W10
Chicago Bears	10	2	0	.833	7–1	375	151	L1
Los Angeles Rams	6	5	1	.545	3–5	327	269	W3
Green Bay Packers	3	9	0	.250	2–6	154	290	L7
Detroit Lions	2	10	0	.167	1–7	200	407	L3

Note: Tie games were not officially counted in the standings until 1972.

NFL Eastern Division
	W	L	T	PCT	DIV	PF	PA	STK
Philadelphia Eagles	9	2	1	.818	7–1	376	156	W1
Washington Redskins	7	5	0	.583	5–3	291	287	W1
New York Giants	4	8	0	.333	3–5	297	388	L2
Pittsburgh Steelers	4	8	0	.333	3–5	200	243	L1
Boston Yanks	3	9	0	.250	2–6	174	372	W1

Note: Tie games were not officially counted in the standings until 1972.

== Roster ==
1948 Los Angeles Rams roster
Backs: 30 Bob Agler FB; 33 Jack Banta RB/CB/P; 25 Joe Corn RB/CB; 9 Gerard Cowhig FB/LB; 18 Fred Gehrke RB/CB; 21 Jim Hardy QB/S; 77 Paul Rickards QB/S; 16 Bob Hoffman FB/LB; 12 Les Horvath RB/CB; 10 Tom Keane RB/CB; 3 Dante Magnani RB; 65 Bruce Smith RB; 13 Kenny Washington S/RB; 7 Bob Waterfield QB/S/K/P; Ends/Receivers: 63 Larry Brink; 40 Don Currivan; 55 Tom Fears; 53 Red Hickey; 46 Bud Hubbell; 79 Bill Smyth; 56 Jack Zilly	Linemen/Linebackers: 66 Gil Bouley T/DT; 86 Ed Champagne T/DT; 84 Hal Dean G/MG; 43 Roger Eason MG/G; 58 Jack Finlay G/LB; 31 Dick Hoerner LB/FB; 20 Dick Huffman T/DT; 27 Milan Lazetich G/MG; 23 Jack Martin C; 22 Fred Naumetz LB/C; 57 Don Paul LB/C; 42 Joe Repko T/DT; 44 Al Sparkman T/DT; 54 Ray Yagiello G/MG; Reserve list: 60 Bob Shaw (end) DE/WR (IR); rookies in italics
