= 1948 NFL draft =

National Football League draft

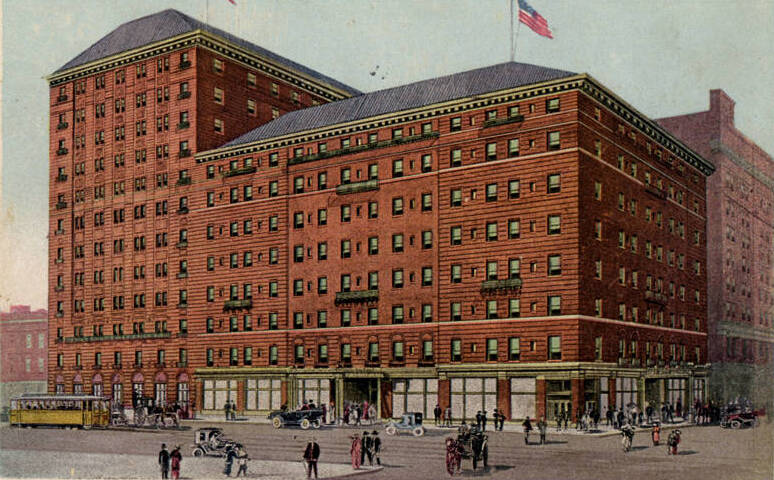
- postcard illustration of the Fort Pitt Hotel (location of the draft)

General information
- Date: December 19, 1947
- Location: Fort Pitt Hotel in Pittsburgh, PA

Overview
- 300 total selections in 32 rounds
- League: NFL
- First selection: Harry Gilmer, HB; Washington Redskins
- Most selections (33): New York Giants
- Fewest selections (28): Chicago Cardinals; Detroit Lions
- Hall of Famers: 6: QB Bobby Layne; QB Y. A. Tittle; OT Lou Creekmur; FB Joe Perry; DE Len Ford; S Emlen Tunnell

The 1948 NFL draft was held on December 19, 1947, at the Fort Pitt Hotel in Pittsburgh. This was the second year that the first overall pick was a bonus pick determined by lottery, with the previous year's winner Chicago Bears ineligible from the draw; it was won by the Washington Redskins, who selected halfback Harry Gilmer.

== Player selections ==
†	=Pro Bowler (Note: Players are identified as Pro Bowlers if they were selected for the Pro Bowl at any time in their career.)
‡	=Hall of Famer (Note: Players are identified as a Hall of Famer if they have been inducted into the Pro Football Hall of Fame.)

Positions key
B	Back	BB	Blocking back	C	Center
E	End	FB	Fullback	G	Guard
OT	Offensive tackle	TB	Tailback	WB	Wingback

Rnd.	Pick	Team	Player	Pos.	College	Notes
1	1	Washington Redskins	Harry Gilmer ^{†}	B	Alabama	Bonus Lottery Pick
1	2	New York Giants	Skip Minisi	HB	Penn	
1	3	Pittsburgh Steelers	Bobby Layne^{‡}^{†}	QB	Texas	from Detroit (Note: No. 3: Detroit -> Pittsburgh. Detroit traded their 1948 first-round selection (No. 3 overall), halfbacks Bob Cifers and Paul White, and the rights to Bob Chappuis to the Pittsburgh Steelers for halfback Bill Dudley.)
1	4	Washington Redskins	Lowell Tew	FB	Alabama	
1	5	Boston Yanks	Vaughn Mancha	C	Alabama	
1	6	Detroit Lions	Y. A. Tittle^{‡}^{†}	QB	LSU	
1	7	Green Bay Packers	Jug Girard	E	Wisconsin	
1	8	Philadelphia Eagles	Clyde Scott	HB	Arkansas	
1	9	Pittsburgh Steelers	Dan Edwards ^{†}	E	Georgia	
1	10	Chicago Bears	Max Bumgardner	DE	Texas	
1	11	Chicago Cardinals	Jim Spavital	FB	Oklahoma A&M	
2	12	New York Giants	Joe Scott	HB	San Francisco	
2	13	Detroit Lions	George Quist	B	Stanford	
3	14	Boston Yanks	John Nolan	T	Penn State	
3	15	Detroit Lions	Les Bingaman ^{†}	T	Illinois	
3	16	Washington Redskins	Tommy Thompson	LB	William & Mary	
3	17	Boston Yanks	Earl Cook	G	SMU	
3	18	Los Angeles Rams	Tom Keane ^{†}	CB	West Virginia	
3	19	Green Bay Packers	Ed Smith	HB	Texas Mines	
3	20	Pittsburgh Steelers	Jerry Nuzum	HB	New Mexico A&M	
3	21	Chicago Bears	Dub Garrett	G	Mississippi State	
3	22	Philadelphia Eagles	Paul Campbell	QB	Texas	
3	23	Chicago Cardinals	Bill Smith	T	North Carolina	
4	24	New York Giants	Bruce Gehrke	E	Columbia	
4	25	Detroit Lions	Jim Minor	T	Arkansas	
5	26	New York Giants	Johnny Wolosky	C	Penn State	
5	27	Green Bay Packers	Don Richards	T	Arkansas	
5	28	Washington Redskins	Dan Sandifer	DB	LSU	
5	29	Boston Yanks	Bill Healy	G	Georgia Tech	
5	30	Los Angeles Rams	Bruce Bailey	B	Virginia	
5	31	Green Bay Packers	Weyman Sellers	E	Georgia	
5	32	Chicago Bears	Knox Ramsey	G	William & Mary	
5	33	Philadelphia Eagles	Jack Myers	FB	UCLA	
5	34	Pittsburgh Steelers	John Wozniak ^{†}	G	Alabama	
5	35	Chicago Cardinals	Jay Smith	E	Mississippi Southern	
6	36	New York Giants	Bill Erickson	G	Ole Miss	
6	37	Detroit Lions	Bob Williamson	T	Hobart	
6	38	Washington Redskins	Jack Weisenburger	B	Michigan	
6	39	Boston Yanks	Phil Slosburg	B	Temple	
6	40	Los Angeles Rams	George Grimes	DB	Virginia	
6	41	Green Bay Packers	Larry Olsonoski	G	Minnesota	
6	42	Philadelphia Eagles	Howard Duncan	C	Ohio State	
6	43	Pittsburgh Steelers	Joe Gasparella	BB	Notre Dame	
6	44	Chicago Bears	Bob Brugge	B	Ohio State	
6	45	Pittsburgh Steelers	Phil O'Reilly	T	Purdue	
7	46	New York Giants	Bob Pfohl	B	Purdue	
7	47	Detroit Lions	Fred Enke	B	Arizona	
7	48	Washington Redskins	Jack Kurkowski	B	Detroit	
7	49	Los Angeles Rams	Gene Ruszkowski	T	Ohio	
7	50	Los Angeles Rams	Noel Cudd	T	West Texas State	
7	51	Green Bay Packers	Jay Rhodemyre	C	Kentucky	
7	52	Pittsburgh Steelers	Bill Luongo	B	Penn	
7	53	Detroit Lions	Moroni Schwab	T	Utah State	
7	54	Philadelphia Eagles	Buddy Tinsley	T	Baylor	
7	55	Chicago Cardinals	Jim Cason ^{†}	S	LSU	
8	56	New York Giants	Ralph Hutchinson	T	Chattanooga	
8	57	New York Giants	Ray Coates	HB	LSU	
8	58	Washington Redskins	Jerry Cady	T	Gustavus Adolphus	
8	59	Boston Yanks	Tex Furse	B	Yale	
8	60	Los Angeles Rams	Bob Walker	B	Colorado Mines	
8	61	Green Bay Packers	Bob Cunz	T	Illinois	
8	62	Chicago Bears	Shorty McWilliams	DB	Mississippi State	
8	63	Philadelphia Eagles	Marty Wendell	G	Notre Dame	
8	64	Pittsburgh Steelers	Jim Cooper	C	North Texas State Teachers	
8	65	Chicago Cardinals	Jim Camp	B	North Carolina	
9	66	New York Giants	Dick Ottele	BB	Washington	
9	67	Detroit Lions	Don Doll ^{†}	S	USC	
9	68	Washington Redskins	Bob Anderson	B	Stanford	
9	69	Boston Yanks	Jim Burton	E	Wesleyan	
9	70	Los Angeles Rams	Mike Graham	B	Cincinnati	
9	71	New York Giants	Ken Wiltgen	E	Northwestern	
9	72	Philadelphia Eagles	Scott Beasley	E	Nevada	
9	73	Pittsburgh Steelers	Ed Ryan	E	Saint Mary's (CA)	
9	74	Chicago Bears	Malachi Mills	T	VMI	
9	75	New York Giants	Ed Royston	G	Wake Forest	
10	76	New York Giants	Stan Magdziak	B	William & Mary	
10	77	Detroit Lions	Paul Cleary	E	USC	
10	78	Washington Redskins	Mike Katrishen	G	Mississippi Southern	
10	79	Boston Yanks	Bob Forbes	B	Florida	
10	80	Los Angeles Rams	Glenn Johnson	T	Arizona State	
10	81	Green Bay Packers	George Walmsley	B	Rice	
10	82	Pittsburgh Steelers	Dick Deranek	B	Indiana	
10	83	Chicago Bears	Dick Flanagan	LB	Ohio State	
10	84	Philadelphia Eagles	Ray Richeson	G	Alabama	
10	85	Chicago Cardinals	Carl Weisner	E	St. Louis	
11	86	New York Giants	Pete Lanzi	E	Youngstown	
11	87	Detroit Lions	Fred Land	T	LSU	
11	88	Washington Redskins	Ed Marshall	T	Penn	
11	89	Boston Yanks	George Roman	T	Western Reserve	
11	90	Los Angeles Rams	Johnny Zisch	E	Colorado	
11	91	Green Bay Packers	Bob Hodges	T	Bradley	
11	92	Chicago Bears	Jim McDowell	G	William & Mary	
11	93	Philadelphia Eagles	Gil Johnson	QB	SMU	
11	94	Pittsburgh Steelers	Paul Redfield	T	Colgate	
11	95	Chicago Cardinals	Gene Corum	G	West Virginia	
12	96	New York Giants	Len Modzeleski	T	Scranton	
12	97	New York Giants	Jim Brieske	C	Michigan	
12	98	Washington Redskins	Ted Andrus	G	Southwestern Louisiana	
12	99	Boston Yanks	Abner Wimberly ^{†}	DE	LSU	
12	100	Los Angeles Rams	Pinky Phleger	T	Stanford	
12	101	Green Bay Packers	Bob Rennebohm	E	Wisconsin	
12	102	Philadelphia Eagles	Bill Wyman	T	Rice	
12	103	Pittsburgh Steelers	George Papach	FB	Purdue	
12	104	Chicago Bears	Mel Sheehan	E	Missouri	
12	105	Chicago Cardinals	Clarence Self	DB	Wisconsin	
13	106	New York Giants	Bob Hatch	B	Boston University	
13	107	Detroit Lions	Russ Steger	B	Illinois	
13	108	Washington Redskins	Carl Russ	B	Rice	
13	109	Boston Yanks	Bob Jensen	DE	Iowa State	
13	110	Los Angeles Rams	Bob Heck	DE	Purdue	
13	111	Green Bay Packers	Perry Moss	B	Illinois	
13	112	Pittsburgh Steelers	Tom Finical	E	Princeton	
13	113	Chicago Bears	Dick Scott	C	Navy	
13	114	Philadelphia Eagles	Jim Walthall	B	West Virginia	
13	115	Chicago Cardinals	John Hollar	FB	Appalachian State	
14	116	New York Giants	John Hanzel	G	Guilford	
14	117	Detroit Lions	Hal Enstice	B	Union (NY)	
14	118	Washington Redskins	Chick Jagade ^{†}	E	Indiana	
14	119	Boston Yanks	Bus Entsminger	B	Missouri	
14	120	Los Angeles Rams	Bill Schroll	LB	LSU	
14	121	Green Bay Packers	Fred Provo	HB	Washington	
14	122	Chicago Bears	Ollie Cline	E	Ohio State	
14	123	Philadelphia Eagles	Dick Kempthorn	B	Michigan	
14	124	Pittsburgh Steelers	Clayton Lane	T	New Hampshire	
14	125	Chicago Cardinals	Bob Hanlon	HB	Loras	
15	126	New York Giants	Dan Garza	E	Oregon	
15	127	Detroit Lions	Pete Elliott	B	Michigan	
15	128	Washington Redskins	Ed Quirk	E	Missouri	
15	129	Boston Yanks	Carmen Ragonese	B	New Hampshire	
15	130	Los Angeles Rams	Bob DeMent	T	Mississippi Southern	
15	131	Green Bay Packers	Lou Agase	T	Illinois	
15	132	Philadelphia Eagles	Dick Rifenburg	E	Michigan	
15	133	Pittsburgh Steelers	Dick Mazuca	G	Canisius	
15	134	Chicago Bears	Rob Goode	B	Texas A&M	
15	135	Chicago Cardinals	George Petrovich	G	Texas	
16	136	New York Giants	Dan Yovetich	E	Montana State	
16	137	Detroit Lions	Dave Templeton	G	Ohio State	
16	138	Washington Redskins	Art Pollard	B	Arizona	
16	139	Boston Yanks	George Ratterman	QB	Notre Dame	
16	140	Los Angeles Rams	Charley Schoenherr	B	Wheaton	
16	141	Green Bay Packers	Travis Raven	B	Texas	
16	142	Pittsburgh Steelers	Bill McPeak ^{†}	DE	Pittsburgh	
16	143	Chicago Bears	Clyde Grimenstein	E	Purdue	
16	144	Philadelphia Eagles	Don Stanton	T	Oregon	
16	145	Chicago Cardinals	Jim Still	B	Georgia Tech	
17	146	New York Giants	Joe Grothus	G	Iowa	
17	147	Detroit Lions	Quentin Sickels	G	Michigan	
17	148	Washington Redskins	Chuck Newman	E	Louisiana Tech	
17	149	Boston Yanks	Nute Trotter	T	Oklahoma	
17	150	Los Angeles Rams	Larry Brink ^{†}	DE	Northern Illinois State	
17	151	Washington Redskins	Dale Schwartzkopf	E	Texas	
17	152	Chicago Bears	John Fallon	G	Notre Dame	
17	153	Philadelphia Eagles	Ralph Kohl	T	Michigan	
17	154	Pittsburgh Steelers	Frank Messoline	B	Scranton	
17	155	Chicago Cardinals	Clay Davis	C	Oklahoma A&M	
18	156	New York Giants	George Mathews	B	Georgia Tech	
18	157	Pittsburgh Steelers	Jim Spruill	T	Rice	
18	158	Washington Redskins	Ray Pearcy	C	Oklahoma	
18	159	Boston Yanks	Jack Mendel	E	Canisius	
18	160	Los Angeles Rams	Bill O'Connor	E	Notre Dame	
18	161	Green Bay Packers	Ken Balge	E	Michigan State	
18	162	Philadelphia Eagles	Aubrey Fowler	HB	Arkansas	
18	163	Pittsburgh Steelers	Tom Lane	T	Muhlenberg	
18	164	Chicago Bears	Ray Brown	B	Virginia	
18	165	Chicago Cardinals	Harry Caughron	T	William & Mary	
19	166	New York Giants	Don Ettinger	LB	Kansas	
19	167	Detroit Lions	Barney Hafen	DE	Utah	
19	168	Washington Redskins	Gene Vellela	T	Scranton	
19	169	Boston Yanks	Mel Jowell	G	McMurry	
19	170	Los Angeles Rams	Bill Nelson	B	Montana State	
19	171	Green Bay Packers	Charley Tatom	T	Texas	
19	172	Pittsburgh Steelers	Pete Barbolak	T	Purdue	
19	173	Chicago Bears	Bob Hileman	C	California	
19	174	Philadelphia Eagles	Rudy Krall	B	New Mexico	
19	175	Chicago Cardinals	Jerry Davis	DB	Southeastern Louisiana	
20	176	New York Giants	Frank Williams	E	Utah State	
20	177	Detroit Lions	Aldo Dellosobelle	T	Loyola (CA)	
20	178	Washington Redskins	Cloyce Box ^{†}	E	West Texas State	
20	179	Boston Yanks	Frank Nelson	B	Utah	
20	180	Los Angeles Rams	Jim Rees	T	NC State	
20	181	Green Bay Packers	Floyd Thomas	C	Arkansas	
20	182	Chicago Bears	Thurman Gay	T	Oklahoma A&M	
20	183	Philadelphia Eagles	Ed Claunch	C	LSU	
20	184	Pittsburgh Steelers	Fred Folger	B	Duke	
20	185	Chicago Cardinals	Gene Dwyer	E	St. Ambrose	
21	186	New York Giants	Dick Woodard	LB	Iowa	
21	187	Detroit Lions	Dean Dill ^{†}	B	USC	
21	188	Washington Redskins	Bryan Bell	B	Washington & Lee	
21	189	Boston Yanks	Jim Lukens	E	Washington & Lee	
21	190	Los Angeles Rams	Ray Borneman	B	Texas	
21	191	Green Bay Packers	Herbert St. John	G	Georgia	
21	192	Philadelphia Eagles	Negley Norton	T	Penn State	
21	193	Pittsburgh Steelers	Charlie Snyder	T	Marshall	
21	194	Chicago Bears	Peppy Blount	E	Texas	
21	195	Chicago Cardinals	Harry Waters	B	Colorado College	
22	196	New York Giants	George Kisiday	E	Columbia	
22	197	Detroit Lions	Jack McEwen	B	Colorado	
22	198	Washington Redskins	Joel Williams	C	Texas	
22	199	Boston Yanks	Fran O'Brien	B	Dartmouth	
22	200	Los Angeles Rams	Ray Yagiello	G	Catawba	
22	201	Green Bay Packers	Red Anderson	B	Rice	
22	202	Pittsburgh Steelers	Tally Stevens	E	Utah	
22	203	Chicago Bears	J. R. Boone	E	Tulsa	
22	204	Philadelphia Eagles	Lockwood Frizzell	C	Virginia	
22	205	Chicago Cardinals	Dick Monroe	C	Kansas	
23	206	New York Giants	Theron Roberts	G	Arkansas	
23	207	Detroit Lions	Rebel Steiner	E	Alabama	
23	208	Washington Redskins	Lou Hoitsma	E	William & Mary	
23	209	Boston Yanks	Jim Zito	T	Michigan State	
23	210	Los Angeles Rams	John Pesek	E	Nebraska	
23	211	Green Bay Packers	Fred Kling	B	Missouri	
23	212	Chicago Bears	Jim Duncan	E	Wake Forest	
23	213	Philadelphia Eagles	Jack Swaner	B	California	
23	214	Pittsburgh Steelers	Dike Norman	C	Washington & Lee	
23	215	Chicago Cardinals	Hindu Reynolds	E	Mississippi Southern	
24	216	New York Giants	Walt McCormick	C	USC	
24	217	Detroit Lions	Joe Suarez	G	Saint Mary's (CA)	
24	218	Washington Redskins	Floyd Lawhorn	G	Texas Tech	
24	219	Boston Yanks	Jack Roderick	E	Yale	
24	220	Los Angeles Rams	Charlie DeAutremont	B	Southern Oregon	
24	221	Green Bay Packers	Clyde Biggers	T	Catawba	
24	222	Philadelphia Eagles	Art Littleton	E	Penn	
24	223	Pittsburgh Steelers	Floyd Simmons	B	Notre Dame	
24	224	Chicago Bears	Jimmy Gatewood	B	Georgia	
24	225	Chicago Cardinals	Dick Wedel	G	Wake Forest	
25	226	New York Giants	Dick Wilkins	E	Oregon	
25	227	Detroit Lions	Coy McGee	B	Notre Dame	
25	228	Washington Redskins	Dick West	B	Princeton	
25	229	Boston Yanks	Eddie Sikorski	B	Muhlenberg	
25	230	Los Angeles Rams	Bob Levenhagen	G	Washington	
25	231	Green Bay Packers	Stan Heath	QB	Nevada	
25	232	Pittsburgh Steelers	Paul Hausser	T	Wichita	
25	233	Chicago Bears	George Brumm	C	Pacific	
25	234	Philadelphia Eagles	Jim Parmer	E	Oklahoma A&M	
25	235	Chicago Cardinals	Paul Shoults	HB	Miami (OH)	
26	236	New York Giants	Vince Marotta	B	Mount Union	
26	237	Detroit Lions	Phil Alexander	T	South Carolina	
26	238	Washington Redskins	Roland Oakes	E	Missouri	
26	239	Boston Yanks	Bruce Mather	B	New Hampshire	
26	240	Los Angeles Rams	Leon Cooper	T	Hardin–Simmons	
26	241	Green Bay Packers	Aubrey Allen	T	Colorado	
26	242	Chicago Bears	Paul Dietzel	C	Miami (OH)	
26	243	Philadelphia Eagles	Lou Creekmur^{‡}^{†}	T	William & Mary	
26	244	Pittsburgh Steelers	Bob Ramsey	B	SMU	
26	245	Chicago Cardinals	Fred Wendt	B	Texas Mines	
27	246	New York Giants	Tom Salisbury	T	Clemson	
27	247	Detroit Lions	Frank Pizza	T	Toledo	
27	248	Washington Redskins	Ed Watkins	T	Idaho	
27	249	Boston Yanks	Jim Shoaf	T	Iowa	
27	250	Los Angeles Rams	Jim Wade	HB	Oklahoma City	
27	251	Green Bay Packers	Stan Gorski	E	Saint Mary's (MN)	
27	252	Philadelphia Eagles	Bill Stanton	DE	NC State	
27	253	Pittsburgh Steelers	Felton Whitlow	T	North Texas State Teachers	
27	254	Chicago Bears	Ed Clasby	B	Boston College	
27	255	Chicago Cardinals	Doug Belden	B	Florida	
28	256	New York Giants	Roy Lilja	C	Colorado College	
28	257	Detroit Lions	George Schutte	T	USC	
28	258	Washington Redskins	Don Corbitt	C	Arizona	
28	259	Boston Yanks	Joe McCary	B	Virginia	
28	260	Los Angeles Rams	Ken Sinofsky	G	Nevada	
28	261	Green Bay Packers	Don Sharp	C	Tulsa	
28	262	Pittsburgh Steelers	Dinky Bowen	B	Georgia Tech	
28	263	Chicago Bears	Fred Hardison	E	Duke	
28	264	Philadelphia Eagles	Bennie Ellender	B	Tulane	
28	265	Chicago Cardinals	Ray Stackhouse	T	Xavier	
29	266	New York Giants	Bobby Greenhalgh	E	San Francisco	
29	267	Detroit Lions	Tony Pabalis	B	Central Michigan	
29	268	Washington Redskins	Buddy Bowen	B	Ole Miss	
29	269	Boston Yanks	Al Sica	B	Penn	
29	270	Los Angeles Rams	Bobby Jack Stuart	B	Tulsa	
29	271	Green Bay Packers	John Panelli	B	Notre Dame	
29	272	Chicago Bears	Frank Van Deren	E	California	
29	273	Philadelphia Eagles	Rex Grossman	LB	Indiana	
29	274	Pittsburgh Steelers	Abe Gibron ^{†}	G	Purdue	
29	275	Chicago Cardinals	Bernie Reid	G	Georgia	
30	276	New York Giants	Ed Kelley	T	Texas	
30	277	Detroit Lions	Bob McCurry	C	Michigan State	
30	278	Washington Redskins	Vic Paulson	E	Santa Barbara	
30	279	Boston Yanks	Harry Bonk	B	Maryland	
30	280	Los Angeles Rams	Junior Crum	E	Arizona	
30	281	Green Bay Packers	Clarence McGeary	DT	North Dakota State	
30	282	Philadelphia Eagles	A. B. Kitchens	T	Tulsa	
30	283	Pittsburgh Steelers	Bruce Hilkene	T	Michigan	
30	284	Chicago Bears	Al Pietkiewicz	E	San Francisco	
30	285	Chicago Cardinals	Jim Powell	E	Tennessee	
31	286	Washington Redskins	Barney Welch	B	Texas A&M	
31	287	Boston Yanks	Bernor Langsjoen	B	Gustavus Adolphus	
31	288	Los Angeles Rams	Tony Kunkiewicz	B	Trinity (CT)	
31	289	Green Bay Packers	Mike Mills	E	BYU	
31	290	Pittsburgh Steelers	Ted Zuchowski	T	Toledo	
31	291	Chicago Bears	Norm Cox	QB	TCU	
31	292	Philadelphia Eagles	Art Statuto	C	Notre Dame	
31	293	Chicago Cardinals	Bob Polidor	B	Villanova	
32	294	Boston Yanks	George Neff	B	Virginia	
32	295	Los Angeles Rams	Bill Taylor	E	Rice	
32	296	Green Bay Packers	Ralph Earhart	HB	Texas Tech	
32	297	Chicago Bears	Truett Smith	B	Mississippi State	
32	298	Philadelphia Eagles	Tom Novak	C	Nebraska	
32	299	Pittsburgh Steelers	Tony DeMattea	B	Pittsburgh	
32	300	Chicago Cardinals	Bill Fischer	G	Notre Dame	

== Hall of Famers ==
- Bobby Layne, quarterback from Texas taken 1st round 3rd overall by the Pittsburgh Steelers.

Inducted: Professional Football Hall of Fame class of 1967.

- Y. A. Tittle, quarterback from LSU taken 1st round 6th overall by the Detroit Lions.

Inducted: Professional Football Hall of Fame class of 1971.

- Lou Creekmur, tackle from William & Mary taken 243rd overall by the Philadelphia Eagles, and again in the 2nd round of the 1950 special draft by the Detroit Lions.

Inducted: Professional Football Hall of Fame class of 1996.

- Joe Perry, fullback from Compton Junior College, signed undrafted by the San Francisco 49ers.

Inducted: Professional Football Hall of Fame class of 1969.

- Emlen Tunnell, cornerback from Iowa, signed undrafted by the New York Giants.

Inducted: Professional Football Hall of Fame class of 1967.

- Len Ford, defensive end from Michigan, signed undrafted by the Cleveland Browns.

Inducted: Professional Football Hall of Fame class of 1976

== Notable undrafted players ==
^{†}	= Pro Bowler	‡	= Hall of Famer

Original NFL team	Player	Pos.	College	Notes
San Francisco 49ers	Joe Perry‡	FB	Compton JC	N/A
Cleveland Browns	Len Ford‡	DE	Michigan	Big Ten
New York Giants	Emlen Tunnell‡	S	Iowa	Big Ten
Chicago Bears	Wash Serini	WR	Kentucky	
Detroit Lions	Bob Mann	WR	Hampton	
Philadelphia Eagles	Walt Barnes ^{†}	G	LSU	
San Francisco 49ers	Bill Johnson ^{†}	C	Texas A&M	
Washington Redskins	Howard Hartley	HB/DB	Duke	

== Trades ==
In the explanations below, (PD) indicates trades completed prior to the start of the draft (i.e. Pre-Draft), while (D) denotes trades that took place during the 2023 NFL draft.

Round one
