= 1948 Washington Redskins season =

NFL team season

- Owner: George Preston Marshall
- General manager: Dick McCann
- Head coach: Turk Edwards
- Home stadium: Griffith Stadium

Results
- Record: 7–5
- Division place: 2nd NFL Eastern
- Playoffs: Did not qualify

The 1948 Washington Redskins season was the franchise's 17th season in the National Football League (NFL) and their 12th in Washington, D.C. the team improved on their 4–8 record from 1947 and finished 7–5.

Although the NFL formally desegregated in 1946, many teams were slow to allow black athletes to compete even after the formal barrier had fallen. None were less willing to desegregate than the Washington Redskins, who sought to be the "home team" for a vast Southern market. The Redskins would remain the last bastion of racial segregation in the NFL, refusing to include a single black player on their roster until 1962.

== Preseason ==
Week	Date	Opponent	Result	Record	Venue	Attendance
1	September 2	at Los Angeles Rams	W 21–10	1–0	Los Angeles Memorial Coliseum	77,100
2	September 6	vs. Chicago Cardinals	L 20–46	1–1	University of Denver Stadium (Denver, CO)	17,782
3	September 11	vs. Green Bay Packers	L 0–43	1–2	Legion Field (Birmingham, AL)	27,000
4	September 19	vs. Chicago Bears	L 14–17	1–3	Municipal Stadium (Baltimore, MD)	20,456

== Regular season ==
=== Schedule ===
Game	Date	Opponent	Result	Record	Venue	Attendance	Recap	Sources
1	September 26	**Pittsburgh Steelers**	**W** 17–14	1–0	Griffith Stadium	32,593	Recap	
2	October 3	**New York Giants**	**W** 41–10	2–0	Griffith Stadium	32,593	Recap	
3	October 10	at **Pittsburgh Steelers**	**L** 7–10	2–1	Forbes Field	28,969	Recap	
4	October 17	**Philadelphia Eagles**	**L** 0–45	2–2	Griffith Stadium	35,584	Recap	
5	October 24	at Green Bay Packers	**W** 23–7	3–2	Wisconsin State Fair Park	13,433	Recap	
6	October 31	**Boston Yanks**	**W** 59–21	4–2	Griffith Stadium	29,758	Recap	
7	November 7	at **Boston Yanks**	**W** 23–7	5–2	Fenway Park	13,659	Recap	
8	November 14	Detroit Lions	**W** 46–21	6–2	Griffith Stadium	32,528	Recap	
9	November 21	at **Philadelphia Eagles**	**L** 21–42	6–3	Shibe Park	36,254	Recap	
10	November 28	at Chicago Bears	**L** 13–48	6–4	Wrigley Field	42,299	Recap	
11	December 5	Los Angeles Rams	**L** 13–41	6–5	Griffith Stadium	32,970	Recap	
12	December 12	at **New York Giants**	**W** 28–21	7–5	Polo Grounds	23,156	Recap	
Note: Intra-division opponents are in **bold** text.

== Standings ==
NFL Eastern Division
	W	L	T	PCT	DIV	PF	PA	STK
Philadelphia Eagles	9	2	1	.818	7–1	376	156	W1
Washington Redskins	7	5	0	.583	5–3	291	287	W1
New York Giants	4	8	0	.333	3–5	297	388	L2
Pittsburgh Steelers	4	8	0	.333	3–5	200	243	L1
Boston Yanks	3	9	0	.250	2–6	174	372	W1

Note: Tie games were not officially counted in the standings until 1972.

== Roster ==
1948 Washington Redskins final roster
Quarterbacks: 33 Sammy Baugh; 52 Harry Gilmer; 30 Jim Youel S; Backs: 0 Steve Bagarus RB/S; 26 Jim Castiglia FB; 14 Tom Farmer RB/CB; 29 Howard Hartley CB/RB; 77 Tommy Mont CB/RB/QB; 50 Bob Nussbaumer RB/S; 25 Dick Poillon RB/S/K/P; 99 Eddie Saenz RB/CB; 20 Dan Sandifer S/RB; 41 Dick Todd RB/CB; Ends/Receivers: 55 Hal Crisler; 45 Paul McKee; 19 Jim Peebles K; 12 Herb Shoener; 28 Hugh Taylor; 37 Joe Tereshinski; 22 Doug Turley	Linemen/Linebackers: 42 John Adams DT/MG/T; 51 Fred Boensch G/MG; 53 Al DeMao OLB/C; 31 Clyde Ehrhardt C/OLB; 60 Bill Gray MLB/G; 58 Mike Katrishen G; 46 John Koniszewski DT/T; 34 Ed Quirk OLB/FB; 44 Mike Roussos T; 49 John Sanchez T/DT; 16 John Steber G/MG; Reserve: 24 Howie Livingston CB/S (IR); rookies in italics
