= List of Columbia Lions in the NFL draft =

This is a list of Columbia Lions football players in the NFL draft.

== Key ==
B	Back	K	Kicker	NT	Nose tackle
C	Center	LB	Linebacker	FB	Fullback
DB	Defensive back	P	Punter	HB	Halfback
DE	Defensive end	QB	Quarterback	WR	Wide receiver
DT	Defensive tackle	RB	Running back	G	Guard
E	End	T	Offensive tackle	TE	Tight end

== Selections ==
Year	Round	Pick	Player	Team	Position
1936	6	46	Al Barabas	Philadelphia Eagles	B
1939	1	2	Sid Luckman	Chicago Bears	QB
1939	17	155	John Siegal	Brooklyn Dodgers	E
1942	11	91	Thornley Wood	Pittsburgh Steelers	B
1943	1	4	Paul Governali	Brooklyn Dodgers	B
1944	28	290	Tom Rock	New York Giants	E
1946	12	101	Vinnie Yablonski	Chicago Cardinals	B
1946	16	142	Bill Swiacki	Boston Yanks	E
1948	4	24	Bruce Gehrke	New York Giants	E
1948	22	196	George Kisiday	New York Giants	T
1949	3	22	Lou Kusserow	Detroit Lions	B
1949	3	24	Bill Olson	New York Giants	B
1949	10	95	Gene Rossides	New York Giants	B
1967	16	401	Jerry Zawadzkas	Detroit Lions	TE
1969	1	9	Marty Domres	San Diego Chargers	QB
1971	11	272	George Starke	Washington Redskins	T
1984	6	160	John Witkowski	Detroit Lions	QB
1997	2	52	Marcellus Wiley	Buffalo Bills	DE
