= 1948 New York Giants season =

NFL team 24th season

- 1948 Giants media guide
- General manager: Ray Walsh
- President: John V. Mara
- Head coach: Steve Owen
- Home stadium: Polo Grounds

Results
- Record: 4–8
- Division place: T–3rd NFL Eastern
- Playoffs: Did not qualify

The 1948 New York Giants season was the franchise's 24th season in the National Football League (NFL). The team ended the year with a record of 4 wins and 8 losses, tied for third place in the league's five-team Eastern Division.

== Regular season ==
=== Schedule ===
Game	Date	Opponent	Result	Record	Venue	Attendance	Recap	Sources
1	September 23	at **Boston Yanks**	**W** 27–7	1–0	Fenway Park	7,428	Recap	
2	October 3	at **Washington Redskins**	**L** 10–41	1–1	Griffith Stadium	32,593	Recap	
3	October 10	at **Philadelphia Eagles**	**L** 0–45	1–2	Shibe Park	22,804	Recap	
4	October 17	Chicago Cardinals	**L** 35–63	1–3	Polo Grounds	35,584	Recap	
5	October 24	**Pittsburgh Steelers**	**W** 34–27	2–3	Polo Grounds	13,443	Recap	
6	October 31	at Chicago Bears	**L** 14–35	2–4	Wrigley Field	41,608	Recap	
7	November 7	**Philadelphia Eagles**	**L** 14–35	2–5	Polo Grounds	24,983	Recap	
8	November 14	Los Angeles Rams	**L** 37–52	2–6	Polo Grounds	22,766	Recap	
9	November 21	at Green Bay Packers	**W** 49–3	3–6	State Fair Park	12,639	Recap	
10	November 28	**Boston Yanks**	**W** 28–14	4–6	Polo Grounds	19,636	Recap	
11	December 5	at **Pittsburgh Steelers**	**L** 28–38	4–7	Forbes Field	27,645	Recap	
12	December 12	**Washington Redskins**	**L** 21–28	4–8	Polo Grounds	23,156	Recap	
Note: Intra-division opponents are in **bold** text. September 23: Thursday night.

== Standings ==
Program for the November 7 game against the Philadelphia Eagles.

NFL Eastern Division
	W	L	T	PCT	DIV	PF	PA	STK
Philadelphia Eagles	9	2	1	.818	7–1	376	156	W1
Washington Redskins	7	5	0	.583	5–3	291	287	W1
New York Giants	4	8	0	.333	3–5	297	388	L2
Pittsburgh Steelers	4	8	0	.333	3–5	200	243	L1
Boston Yanks	3	9	0	.250	2–6	174	372	W1

Note: Tie games were not officially counted in the standings until 1972.

== Roster ==
1948 New York Giants final roster
Backs: 16 John Atwood RB/CB; 49 Ray Coates RB/CB; 42 Charlie Conerly RB/P; 41 Paul Governali RB; 38 Skip Minisi RB/CB; 44 Frank Reagan CB/RB/P; 35 Gene Roberts RB; 30 Joe Scott RB/CB; 21 Joe Sulaitis RB/S; 45 Emlen Tunnell S/RB; Ends/Receivers: 83 Bruce Gehrke; 88 Joe Johnson; 31 Joyce Pipkin; 82 Ray Poole; 81 Bill Swiacki; 86 Paul Walker	Linemen/Linebackers: 72 Larry Beil T/DT; 52 John Cannady C/MLB; 79 Tex Coulter T/DT; 67 Bob Dobelstein G/DT/MG; 76 Bill Erickson T/G; 74 Don Ettinger MG/G; 55 Carl Fennema MLB/C; 20 Ken Keuper OLB; 61 Ed Royston G/MG; 75 Bill Schuler T/DT; 70 John Treadaway T/DT; 77 Jim White T/DT; 33 Frank Williams OLB/FB/K; 60 Len Younce G/MG/K; rookies in italics

== See also ==
- List of New York Giants seasons
