= 1948 Philadelphia Eagles season =

NFL team season

- Owner: Lex Thompson
- Head coach: Earle "Greasy" Neale
- Home stadium: Shibe Park

Results
- Record: 9–2–1
- Division place: 1st NFL Eastern
- Playoffs: Won NFL Championship (vs. Cardinals) 7–0

The 1948 Philadelphia Eagles season was the franchise's 16th season in the National Football League (NFL). The Eagles repeated as Eastern Division champions and returned to the NFL Championship game, this time defeating the Chicago Cardinals to win their first NFL title.

== Off season ==
The Eagles travel to New York State to hold training camp at Saranac Lake High School Field in Saranac Lake, New York, in northern New York State near Lake Placid and in the Adirondack Park. As of 2014 the building where the Eagles stayed is still a local landmark and is located on Lake Street in Saranac Lake and it is still called the Eagles Nest.

=== NFL draft ===
The 1948 NFL draft was held on December 19, 1947, five days after the end of the regular season, and nine days before the championship game was played. The Eagles finished the 1947 season with an 8–4 record. Tied with the Chicago Bears and Pittsburgh Steelers they picked 7th, 8th or 9th normally in the 32 rounds that they had picks.

The Washington Redskins had a lottery bonus pick at number one and chose Harry Gilmer, Back out of the University of Alabama. In the first round, the Eagles selected Clyde Scott, a running back from the University of Arkansas.

The Eagles' 26th round pick, Lou Creekmur, did not make the team but ended up becoming a Hall of Fame player for the Detroit Lions.

Many of the draft picks made by NFL teams ended up playing for teams in the rival All-America Football Conference (AAFC).

=== Player selections ===
The table shows the Eagles selections and what picks they had that were traded away and the team that ended up with that pick. It is possible the Eagles' pick ended up with this team via another team that the Eagles made a trade with. Not shown are acquired picks that the Eagles traded away.

= Pro Bowler	= Hall of Famer

Rd	Pick	Player	Position	School	Rd	Pick	Player	Position	School
1	8	Clyde Scott	Back	Arkansas	2		No PICK		
3	22	Paul Campbell	Quarterback	Texas	4		No PICK		
5	33	Jack "Moose" Myers	Back	UCLA	6	42	Howard Duncan	Center	Ohio State
7	54	Buddy Tinsley	Tackle	Baylor	8	63	Marty Wendell	Guard	Notre Dame
9	72	Scott Beasle	End	Nevada-Reno	10	84	Ray Richeson	Guard	Alabama
11	93	Gil Johnson	Quarterback	Southern Methodist	12	102	Bill Wyman	Tackle	Rice
13	114	Jim Walthall	Back	West Virginia	14	123	Dick Kempthorn	Back	Michigan
15	132	Dick Rifenburg	End	Michigan	16	144	Don Stanton	Tackle	Oregon
17	153	Ralph Kohl	Tackle	Michigan	18	162	Aubrey Fowler	Back	Arkansas
19	174	Rudy Krall	Back	New Mexico	20	183	Ed Claunch	Center	LSU
21	192	Negley Norton	Tackle	Penn State	22	204	Lockwood Frizzell	Center	Virginia
23	213	Jack Swaner	Back	California	24	222	Art Littleton	End	Pennsylvania
25	234	Jim Parmer	Back	Oklahoma State	26	243	Lou Creekmur	Tackle	William & Mary
27	252	Bill Stanton	End	North Carolina State	28	264	Bennie Ellender	Back	Tulane
29	273	Rex Grossman	Back	Indiana	30	282	A. B. Kitchens	Tackle	Tulsa
31	292	Art Statuto	Center	Notre Dame	32	298	Tom Novak	Center	Nebraska

== Regular season ==
=== Schedule ===
Week	Date	Opponent	Result	Record	Venue	Attendance
1	September 24	at Chicago Cardinals	**L** 14–21	0–1	Comiskey Park	24,159
2	October 3	at Los Angeles Rams	**T** 28–28	0–1–1	Los Angeles Memorial Coliseum	24,597
3	October 10	**New York Giants**	**W** 45–0	1–1–1	Shibe Park	22,804
4	October 17	at **Washington Redskins**	**W** 45–0	2–1–1	Griffith Stadium	35,580
5	October 24	Chicago Bears	**W** 12–7	3–1–1	Shibe Park	36,227
6	October 31	at **Pittsburgh Steelers**	**W** 34–7	4–1–1	Forbes Field	32,859
7	November 7	at **New York Giants**	**W** 35–14	5–1–1	Polo Grounds	24,983
8	November 14	**Boston Yanks**	**W** 45–0	6–1–1	Shibe Park	22,958
9	November 21	**Washington Redskins**	**W** 42–21	7–1–1	Shibe Park	36,254
10	November 28	**Pittsburgh Steelers**	**W** 17–0	8–1–1	Shibe Park	22,001
11	December 5	at **Boston Yanks**	**L** 14–37	8–2–1	Fenway Park	9,652
12	December 12	Detroit Lions	**W** 45–21	9–2–1	Shibe Park	15,322
Note: Intra-division opponents are in **bold** text.

== Game recaps ==
=== Week 1 ===
Sunday, September 14, 1948

Played at Comiskey Park in Chicago

	1Q	2Q	3Q	4Q	Final
Philadelphia Eagles (0–1)	0	7	7	0	14
Chicago Cardinals (1–0)	7	7	0	7	21

		SCORING PLAYS	PHIL	CHI C	TIME
1st	Cardinals	Charlie Trippi 8-yard rush (Pat Harder kick)	0	7	
2nd	Cardinals	Mal Kutner 30-yard pass from Paul Christman (Pat Harder kick)	0	14	
	Eagles	Bosh Pritchard 34-yard pass from Tommy Thompson (Cliff Patton kick)	7	14	
3rd	Eagles	Pete Pihos 42-yard pass from Tommy Thompson (Cliff Patton kick)	14	14	
4th	Cardinals	Mal Kutner 64-yard pass from Charlie Trippi (Pat Harder kick)	14	21	

=== Week 2 ===
Sunday, October 3, 1948

Played at Los Angeles Memorial Coliseum in Los Angeles, CA

	1Q	2Q	3Q	4Q	Final
Philadelphia Eagles (0–1–1)	7	14	7	0	28
Los Angeles Rams (1–0–1)	0	0	7	21	28

		SCORING PLAYS	PHIL	LA	TIME
1st	Eagles	Pete Pihos 40-yard pass from Tommy Thompson (Cliff Patton kick)	7	0	
2nd	Eagles	Pete Pihos 36-yard pass from Tommy Thompson (Cliff Patton kick)	14	0	
	Eagles	Neill Armstrong 13-yard pass from Tommy Thompson (Cliff Patton kick)	21	0	
3rd	Eagles	Bosh Pritchard 52-yard rush (Cliff Patton kick)	28	0	
	Rams	Jack Zilly 27-yard pass from Bob Waterfield (Bob Waterfield kick)	28	7	
4th	Rams	Bill Smyth 3-yard pass from Bob Waterfield (Bob Waterfield kick)	28	14	
	Rams	Bob Hoffman 1-yard rush (Bob Waterfield kick)	28	21	
	Rams	Jack Zilly 20-yard pass from Bob Waterfield (Bob Waterfield kick)	28	28	

=== Week 3 ===
Sunday, October 10, 1948

Played at Shibe Park in Philadelphia, Pennsylvania

	1Q	2Q	3Q	4Q	Final
New York Giants (1–2–0)	0	0	0	0	0
Philadelphia Eagles (1–1–1)	14	7	3	21	45

		SCORING PLAYS	NY G	PHIL	TIME
1st	Eagles	Steve Van Buren 1-yard rush (Cliff Patton kick)	0	7	
	Eagles	Pete Pihos 28-yard pass from Tommy Thompson (Cliff Patton kick)	0	14	
2nd	Eagles	Eagles Ernie Steele 32-yard pass from Tommy Thompson (Cliff Patton kick)	0	21	
3rd	Eagles	Cliff Patton 27-yard field goal	0	24	
4th	Eagles	Tommy Thompson 1-yard rush (Cliff Patton kick)	0	31	
	Eagles	Ben Kish 66-yard rush (Cliff Patton kick)	0	38	
	Eagles	Jim Parmer 7-yard rush (Cliff Patton kick)	0	45	

=== Week 4 ===
Sunday, October 17, 1948

Played at Griffith Stadium in Washington, DC

	1Q	2Q	3Q	4Q	Final
Philadelphia Eagles (1–1–1)	14	10	14	7	45
Washington Redskins (2–2–0)	0	0	0	0	0

		SCORING PLAYS	PHIL	WASH	TIME
1st	Eagles	Pete Pihos 19-yard pass from Tommy Thompson (Cliff Patton kick)	7	0	
	Eagles	Steve Van Buren 1-yard rush (Cliff Patton kick)	14	0	
2nd	Eagles	Cliff Patton 23-yard field goal	17	0	
	Eagles	Steve Van Buren 3-yard rush (Cliff Patton kick)	24	0	
3rd	Eagles	Bosh Pritchard 32-yard rush (Cliff Patton kick)	31	0	
	Eagles	Steve Van Buren 7-yard rush (Cliff Patton kick)	38	0	
4th	Eagles	Ernie Steele 4-yard rush (Cliff Patton kick)	45	0	

=== Week 5 ===
Sunday, October 24, 1948

Played at Shibe Park in Philadelphia, Pennsylvania

The Eagles recorded their first-ever win against the Bears, snapping a 10-game losing streak and an 11-game winless streak against them.

	1Q	2Q	3Q	4Q	Final
Chicago Bears (4–1–0)	0	0	7	0	7
Philadelphia Eagles (3–1–1)	7	0	0	5	12

		SCORING PLAYS	CHI B	PHIL	TIME
1st	Eagles	Steve Van Buren 8-yard rush (Cliff Patton kick)	0	7	
3rd	Bears	Ken Kavanaugh 42-yard pass from Johnny Lujack (Johnny Lujack kick)	7	7	
4th	Eagles	Cliff Patton 38-yard field goal	7	10	
	Eagles	Safety, Luckman tackled in end zone by Barnes	7	12	

=== Week 6 ===
Sunday, October 31, 1948

Played at Forbes Field in Pittsburgh, PA

	1Q	2Q	3Q	4Q	Final
Philadelphia Eagles (4–1–1)	3	14	0	17	34
Pittsburgh Steelers (2–4–0)	0	7	0	0	7

		SCORING PLAYS	PHIL	PITT	TIME
1st	Eagles	Cliff Patton 42-yard field goal	3	7	
2nd	Steelers	Jerry Shipkey 1-yard rush (Joe Glamp kick)	3	7	
	Eagles	Steve Van Buren 20-yard rush (Cliff Patton kick)	10	7	
	Eagles	Jack Ferrante 7-yard pass from Tommy Thompson (Cliff Patton kick)	17	7	
4th	Eagles	Bosh Pritchard 55-yard punt return (Cliff Patton kick)	24	7	
	Eagles	Cliff Patton 23-yard field goal	27	7	
	Eagles	Bosh Pritchard 18-yard fumble return (Cliff Patton kick)	34	7	

=== Week 7 ===
Sunday, November 7, 1948

Played at Polo Grounds in New York, NY

	1Q	2Q	3Q	4Q	Final
Philadelphia Eagles (5–1–1)	7	7	14	7	35
New York Giants (2–5–0)	0	0	7	7	14

		SCORING PLAYS	PHIL	PITT	TIME
1st	Eagles	Pete Pihos 26-yard pass from Tommy Thompson (Cliff Patton kick)	7	0	
2nd	Eagles	Pete Pihos 34-yard pass from Tommy Thompson (Cliff Patton kick)	14	0	
3rd	Eagles	Steve Van Buren 6-yard rush (Cliff Patton kick)	21	0	
	Giants	Joe Scott 11-yard pass from Charlie Conerly (Len Younce kick)	21	7	
	Eagles	Bosh Pritchard 65-yard rush (Cliff Patton kick)	28	7	
4th	Eagles	Steve Van Buren 3-yard rush (Cliff Patton kick)	35	7	
	Giants	John Atwood 26-yard pass from Ray Coates (Len Younce kick)	35	14	

=== Week 8 ===
Sunday, November 14, 1948

Played at Shibe Park in Philadelphia, Pennsylvania

For third time in the 1948 season, and the second time playing at Shibe Park, the Eagles win a game by the score of 45–0.

	1Q	2Q	3Q	4Q	Final
Boston Yanks (2–7–0)	0	0	0	0	0
Philadelphia Eagles (6–1–1)	3	14	7	21	45

		SCORING PLAYS	BOS	PHIL	TIME
2nd	Eagles	Russ Craft 70-yard pass from Tommy Thompson (Cliff Patton kick)	0	7	
	Eagles	Jack Ferrante 20-yard pass from Tommy Thompson (Cliff Patton kick)	0	14	
	Eagles	Pete Pihos 26-yard pass from Tommy Thompson (Cliff Patton kick)	0	21	
	Eagles	Cliff Patton 37-yard field goal	0	24	
3rd	Eagles	Bosh Pritchard 2-yard pass from Tommy Thompson (Cliff Patton kick)	0	31	
4th	Eagles	Neill Armstrong 14-yard pass from Bill Mackrides (Cliff Patton kick)	0	38	
	Eagles	Jim Parmer 5-yard rush (Cliff Patton kick)	0	45	

=== Week 9 ===
Sunday, November 21, 1948

Played at Shibe Park in Philadelphia, Pennsylvania

	1Q	2Q	3Q	4Q	Final
Washington Redskins (6–3–0)	0	14	0	7	21
Philadelphia Eagles (7–1–1)	14	7	14	7	42

		SCORING PLAYS	WASH	PHIL	TIME
1st	Eagles	Steve Van Buren 6-yard rush (Cliff Patton kick)	0	7	
	Eagles	Neill Armstrong 25-yard pass from Tommy Thompson (Cliff Patton kick)	0	14	
2nd	Eagles	Jack Myers 29-yard rush (Cliff Patton kick)	0	21	
	Redskins	Hal Crisler 30-yard pass from Sammy Baugh (Dick Poillon kick)	7	21	
	Redskins	Hal Crisler 79-yard pass from Sammy Baugh (Dick Poillon kick)	14	21	
3rd	Eagles	Russ Craft 24-yard pass from Tommy Thompson (Cliff Patton kick)	14	28	
	Eagles	Pete Pihos 19-yard pass from Tommy Thompson (Cliff Patton kick)	14	35	
4th	Redskins	Dick Poillon 93-yard fumble return (Dick Poillon kick)	21	35	
	Eagles	Jack Ferrante 15-yard pass from Bill Mackrides (Cliff Patton kick)	21	42	

=== Week 10 ===
Sunday, November 28, 1948

Played at Shibe Park in Philadelphia, Pennsylvania

	1Q	2Q	3Q	4Q	Final
Pittsburgh Steelers (3–7–0)	0	0	0	0	0
Philadelphia Eagles (8–1–1)	7	10	0	0	17

		SCORING PLAYS	PITT	PHIL	TIME
1st	Eagles	Eagles Bosh Pritchard 5-yard rush (Cliff Patton kick)	0	7	
2nd	Eagles	Pete Pihos 13-yard pass from Tommy Thompson (Cliff Patton kick)	0	14	
	Eagles	Cliff Patton 31-yard field goal	0	17	

=== Week 11 ===
Sunday, December 5, 1948

Played at Fenway Park in Boston, MA

	1Q	2Q	3Q	4Q	Final
Philadelphia Eagles (8–2–1)	7	7	0	0	14
Boston Yanks (3–9–0)	10	21	0	6	37

		SCORING PLAYS	PHIL	BOS	TIME
1st	Eagles	Jack Ferrante 14-yard pass from Tommy Thompson (Cliff Patton kick)	7	0	
	Yanks	Frank Muehlheuser 35-yard rush (Nick Scollard kick)	7	7	
	Yanks	Nick Scollard 35-yard field goal	7	10	
2nd	Yanks	Frank Seno 68-yard pass from Phil Slosburg (Nick Scollard kick)	7	17	
	Yanks	Bill Chipley 38-yard interception return (Nick Scollard kick)	7	24	
	Eagles	Joe Muha 20-yard pass from Tommy Thompson (Cliff Patton kick)	14	24	
	Yanks	Joe Golding 89-yard interception return (Nick Scollard kick)	14	31	
4th	Yanks	Rudy Romboli 2-yard rush (kick failed)	14	37	

=== Week 12 ===
Sunday, December 12, 1948

Played at Shibe Park in Philadelphia, Pennsylvania

	1Q	2Q	3Q	4Q	Final
Detroit Lions (2–10–0)	0	7	7	7	21
Philadelphia Eagles (9–2–1)	3	14	7	21	45

		SCORING PLAYS	DET	PHIL	TIME
1st	Eagles	Cliff Patton 23-yard field goal	0	3	
2nd	Eagles	Pete Pihos 10-yard pass from Tommy Thompson (Cliff Patton kick)	0	10	
	Eagles	Jack Ferrante 66-yard pass from Tommy Thompson (Cliff Patton kick)	0	17	
	Lions	Bill Dudley 4-yard pass from Clyde LeForce (Merv Pregulman kick)	7	17	
3rd	Lions	Bill Dudley 10-yard pass from Clyde LeForce (Merv Pregulman kick)	14	17	
	Eagles	Steve Van Buren 16-yard rush (Cliff Patton kick)	14	24	
4th	Lions	John Greene 38-yard pass from Clyde LeForce (Merv Pregulman kick)	21	24	
	Eagles	Jack Ferrante 15-yard pass from Tommy Thompson (Cliff Patton kick)	21	31	
	Eagles	Jim Parmer 42-yard rush (Cliff Patton kick)	21	38	
	Eagles	Jack Ferrante 23-yard pass from Tommy Thompson (Cliff Patton kick)	21	45	

== Standings ==
NFL Eastern Division
	W	L	T	PCT	DIV	PF	PA	STK
Philadelphia Eagles	9	2	1	.818	7–1	376	156	W1
Washington Redskins	7	5	0	.583	5–3	291	287	W1
New York Giants	4	8	0	.333	3–5	297	388	L2
Pittsburgh Steelers	4	8	0	.333	3–5	200	243	L1
Boston Yanks	3	9	0	.250	2–6	174	372	W1

Note: Tie games were not officially counted in the standings until 1972.

== Playoffs ==
Round	Date	Opponent	Result	Record	Venue	Attendance
NFL Championship	December 19	Chicago Cardinals	W 7–0	1–0	Shibe Park	28,864

=== NFL Championship Game ===
The NFL Championship game was played at Philadelphia's Shibe Park on December 19 during a blizzard. Thinking the game would not be played in the blizzard, Steve Van Buren remained home until Eagles coach Earle "Greasy" Neale called him and told him the game was still on. He had to catch 3 trolleys and walk 12 blocks in order to make the game on time.

The paid attendance for the game was 36,309 (28,864 actual), and it was scoreless until early in the fourth quarter. The Eagles recovered a fumble that set up Van Buren's five-yard touchdown at 1:05 into the fourth quarter. The Cardinals disputed that the ball or Van Buren had crossed the snow-covered goal line.

This was the Cardinals' last appearance in any NFL Championship game in the 20th century. There is said to be a curse on the football Cardinals that followed them from Chicago to St. Louis and on to Arizona.

== Roster ==
All time List of Philadelphia Eagles players in franchise history

= 1940 All-Star Selection	= Hall of Famer

- + After name means 1st team selection

NO.	Player	AGE	POS	GP	GS	WT	HT	YRS	College
	Earle "Greasy" Neale	58	COACH						West Virginia Wesleyan
	Neill Armstrong	22	E-DB	12	4	189	6–2	1	Oklahoma State
	Walt Barnes	30	G	11	0	238	6–1	Rookie	LSU
	Russ Craft	29	DB-HB	12	2	178	5–9	2	Alabama
	Noble Doss	28	HB	11	0	186	6–0	1	Texas
	Otis Douglas	37	T	5	0	224	6–1	2	William & Mary
	Jack Ferrante	32	E-DE	12	0	197	6–1	7	none
	Mario Giannelli	28	MG-G	12	1	265	6–0	Rookie	Boston College
	John Green	27	DE-E	12	9	192	6–1	1	Tulsa
	Fred Hartman	31	T	12	0	229	6–1	1	_{Rice, and Schreiner College}
	Dick Humbert	30	E-DE	12	0	179	6–1	7	Richmond
	Al Johnson	26	QB-P	5	0		6–0	Rookie	Hardin-Simmons
	Bucko Kilroy	27	G-MG-T-DT	12	12	243	6–2	5	_{Notre Dame and Temple}
	Ben Kish	31	B	9	0	207	6–0	8	Pittsburgh
	Vic Lindskog	34	C	12	11	203	6–1	4	Stanford
	Jay MacDowell	29	T-DE	12	10	217	6–2	2	Washington
39	Bill Mackrides	23	QB	10	1	182	5–11	1	Nevada-Reno
	John Magee	25	G	12	8	220	5–10	Rookie	_{La-Lafayette, and Rice}
	Bap Manzini	28	C	3	0	195	5–11	4	St. Vincent
	Duke Maronic	27	G	12	1	209	5–9	4	none
	Pat McHugh	29	DB-HB	10	1	166	5–11	1	Georgia Tech
36	Joe Muha	27	FB-LB	11	11	205	6–1	2	Virginia Military Institute
	Jack Myers	24	FB-QB-LB	12	7	200	6–2	Rookie	UCLA
	Les Palmer	25	HB	5	0	190	6–0	Rookie	North Carolina State
	Jim Parmer	22	FB-HB	11	2	193	6–0	Rookie	_{Oklahoma State, and Texas A&M}
65	Cliff Patton	25	G-LB	12	2	243	6–2	2	TCU
35	Pete Pihos	25	E-DE	12	11	210	6–1	1	Indiana
	Hal Prescott	28	E	11	0	199	6–1	2	Hardin-Simmons
	Bosh Pritchard	29	HB	12	9	164	5–11	6	_{Georgia Tech, and VMI}
	George Savitsky	24	T	12	0	244	6–2	Rookie	Pennsylvania
	Vic Sears	30	T-DT	12	2	223	6–3	7	Oregon State
	Ernie Steele	31	HB-DB	12	2	187	6–0	6	Washington
	Gil Steinke	29	HB	2	1	175	6–0	3	Texas A&M-Kingsville
	Frank Szymanski	25	C	9	0	225	5–11	3	Notre Dame
11	Tommy Thompson	32	QB	12	4	192	6–1	8	Tulsa
15	Steve Van Buren+	28	HB	11	8	200	6–0	4	LSU
	Al Wistert	28	T-G-DT	12	12	214	6–1	5	Michigan
53	Alex Wojciechowicz	33	C-LB-E	10	1	217	5–11	1	Fordham
	Team Totals; 37 players	28.1		12		200.0	6–0.4	3.0	

== Postseason ==
=== NFL Championship Game recap ===
1948 NFL Championship Game

Sunday, December 19, 1948

Played at Shibe Park in Philadelphia, Pennsylvania. Weather: Snow, Blizzard conditions

	1Q	2Q	3Q	4Q	Final
Chicago Cardinals (11–2–0)	0	0	0	0	0
Philadelphia Eagles (10–1–1)	0	0	0	7	7

		SCORING PLAYS	CHI C	PHIL	TIME
1st	Eagles	Steve Van Buren 5-yard rush (Cliff Patton kick)	0	7	13:55

Attendance: 36,309 (paid), 28,864 (actual)

== Awards and honors ==
- Tommy Thompson leads league in Passing TDs – 25
- Tommy Thompson leads league in Passer Rating- PHI 98.4
- Steve Van Buren leads league in Rushing Attempts – 201
- Steve Van Buren leads league in Rushing Yards – 945
- Steve Van Buren leads league in Rushing TDs – 10
- Cliff Patton Leads League in Field Goals Made – 8
- QB Tommy Thompson, LH Steve Van Buren, RG Bucko Kilroy, RT Al Wistert, RE Pete Pihos, and P Joe Muha are named to numerous All-Pro teams at season's end

Pro Football Hall of Fame members

- Alex Wojciechowicz – 1968
- Steve Van Buren – 1965
- Pete Pihos – 1970
- Greasy Neale – 1969 as coach
