= List of Detroit Titans in the NFL draft =

This is a list of Detroit Titans football players in the NFL draft.

== Key ==
B	Back	K	Kicker	NT	Nose tackle
C	Center	LB	Linebacker	FB	Fullback
DB	Defensive back	P	Punter	HB	Halfback
DE	Defensive end	QB	Quarterback	WR	Wide receiver
DT	Defensive tackle	RB	Running back	G	Guard
E	End	T	Offensive tackle	TE	Tight end

= Pro Bowler
= Hall of Famer

== Selections ==
Year	Round	Pick	Overall	Player	Team	Position
1937	1	9	9	Andy Farkas	Washington Redskins	B
1939	7	2	52	Eddie Palumbo	Pittsburgh Steelers	B
1941	4	1	26	Al Ghesquiere	Philadelphia Eagles	B
1941	10	5	85	Ted Pavelec	Detroit Lions	T
1941	13	6	116	Cass Brovarney	New York Giants	G
1942	4	4	30	Vince Banonis	Chicago Cardinals	C
1944	18	3	178	Elmer Madarik	Detroit Lions	B
1945	8	7	72	Jack Lowther	Detroit Lions	B
1945	26	7	270	Bob Ivory	Detroit Lions	G
1945	32	2	326	Tom Dorais	Detroit Lions	B
1946	22	7	207	Jack Simmons	Detroit Lions	B
1946	23	8	218	Joe Pulte	Detroit Lions	E
1947	9	2	67	Gene Malinowski	Boston Yanks	C
1947	11	1	86	Pete Sullivan	Detroit Lions	T
1947	17	3	148	Jack Hart	Washington Redskins	T
1947	28	1	256	Arch Kelly	Detroit Lions	E
1948	9	2	67	Jack Kurkowski	Washington Redskins	B
1949	11	3	104	Edo Mencotti	New York Bulldogs	B
1950	5	13	66	Mike Kaysserian	Philadelphia Eagles	B
1950	9	4	109	Ed Wood	Detroit Lions	G
1950	16	4	200	Jerry Greiner	Detroit Lions	C
1950	24	6	306	Tom Finnin	New York Giants	T
1950	30	12	390	Jim Massey	Cleveland Browns	B
1951	14	5	164	Lee Wittmer	Detroit Lions	T
1951	30	7	358	Ron Horwath	Detroit Lions	B
1953	1	5	5	Ted Marchibroda	Pittsburgh Steelers	QB
1953	23	2	267	Ed Bierne	Washington Redskins	E
1954	8	3	88	Dennis McCotter	Baltimore Colts	G
1954	16	6	187	Cas Krol	Pittsburgh Steelers	T
1954	24	3	283	Jack Flanagan	Pittsburgh Steelers	E
1954	25	8	297	Ray Zambiasi	Philadelphia Eagles	B
1955	4	11	48	Lee Riley	Detroit Lions	B
1957	5	6	55	Perry Richards	Pittsburgh Steelers	E
1958	24	1	278	John Jereck	Green Bay Packers	T
1959	15	5	173	Bruce Maher	Detroit Lions	B
1959	16	3	183	John Dingens	Chicago Cardinals	T
1960	10	3	111	Grady Alderman	Detroit Lions	T
1960	12	1	133	Tom Chapman	Chicago Cardinals	E
1961	11	10	150	Larry Vargo	Detroit Lions	E
1961	12	1	155	Steve Stonebreaker	Minnesota Vikings	E
1961	12	5	159	Frank Jackunas	Pittsburgh Steelers	T
1961	16	1	211	Ted Karpowicz	Minnesota Vikings	RB
1962	14	11	193	Jim Shorter	Cleveland Browns	B
1964	17	10	234	Dennis Shaw	Pittsburgh Steelers	C
1965	11	2	142	Steve Mass	San Francisco 49ers	T
