= Ray Coates =

American football player (1924–2013)

No. 49
- Positions: Halfback, defensive back

Personal information
- Born: May 8, 1924; New Orleans, Louisiana, U.S.
- Died: July 3, 2013 (aged 89); New Orleans, Louisiana, U.S.
- Listed height: 6 ft 1 in (1.85 m)
- Listed weight: 195 lb (88 kg)

Career information
- High school: Jesuit (New Orleans)
- College: LSU (1944-1947)
- NFL draft: 1948: 8th round, 57th overall pick

Career history
- New York Giants (1948–1949)

Career NFL statistics
- Rushing yards: 231
- Rushing average: 3
- Receptions: 8
- Receiving yards: 152
- Total touchdowns: 4
- Stats at Pro Football Reference

Rayford Jerald Coates (May 8, 1924 – July 3, 2013) was an American professional football player. He played two seasons in the National Football League (NFL) as a halfback for the New York Giants. He attended Louisiana State University, where he played college football for the LSU Tigers football team.He was MVP of the 1947 Cotton Bowl. He was also a member of LSU's 1946 SEC championship baseball team. For five decades he held the LSU record for longest punt, at 76-yards against Rice in 1944.

He scored four touchdowns in his professional career: three rushing in 1948 and one receiving in 1949. He also threw a touchdown pass in 1948, and recorded an interception and four fumble recoveries on defense in 1949.
