= 1948 Green Bay Packers season =

NFL team season

- Head coach: Curly Lambeau
- Home stadium: City Stadium; Wisconsin State Fair Park

Results
- Record: 3–9
- Division place: 4th NFL Western
- Playoffs: Did not qualify

The 1948 Green Bay Packers season was their 30th season overall and their 28th season in the National Football League. The team finished with a 3–9 record under coach Curly Lambeau, earning a fourth-place finish in the Western Conference.

== Offseason ==
=== NFL draft ===
Round	Pick	Player	Position	School/club team
1	7	Earl Girard	Halfback	Wisconsin
3	19	Ed Smith	Halfback	UTEP
5	27	Don Richards	Tackle	Arkansas
5	31	Weyman Sellers	End	Georgia
6	41	Larry Olsonoski	Guard	Minnesota
7	51	Jay Rhodemyre	Center	Kentucky
8	61	Bob Cunz	Tackle	Illinois
10	81	George Walmsley	Back	Rice
11	91	Bob Hodges	Tackle	Bradley
12	101	Bob Rennebohm	End	Wisconsin
13	111	Perry Moss	Quarterback	Illinois
14	121	Fred Provo	Halfback	Washington
15	131	Lou Agase	Tackle	Illinois
16	141	Travis Raven	Back	Texas
18	161	Ken Balge	End	Michigan State
19	171	Charley Tatom	Tackle	Texas
20	181	Floyd Thomas	Center	Arkansas
21	191	Herbert St. John	Guard	Georgia
22	201	Don Anderson	Back	Rice
23	211	Fred Kling	Back	Missouri
24	221	Clyde Biggers	Tackle	Catawba
25	231	Stan Heath	Quarterback	Nevada
26	241	Aubrey Allen	Tackle	Colorado
27	251	Stan Gorski	End	St. Mary's (MN)
28	261	Don Sharp	Center	Tulsa
29	271	John Panelli	Back	Notre Dame
30	281	Clarence McGeary	Defensive Tackle	North Dakota State
31	289	Gayland Mills	End	BYU
32	296	Ralph Earhart	Halfback	Texas Tech

== Regular season ==
=== Schedule ===
Game	Date	Opponent	Result	Record	Venue	Attendance	Recap	Sources
1	September 17	at Boston Yanks	**W** 31–0	1–0	Fenway Park	15,442	Recap	
2	September 26	**Chicago Bears**	**L** 7–45	1–1	City Stadium	25,546	Recap	
3	October 3	**Detroit Lions**	**W** 33–21	2–1	City Stadium	24,206	Recap	
4	October 10	**Chicago Cardinals**	**L** 7–17	2–2	State Fair Park	34,369	Recap	
5	October 17	at **Los Angeles Rams**	**L** 10–24	2–3	LA Memorial Coliseum	25,119	Recap	
6	October 24	Washington Redskins	**L** 7–23	2–4	State Fair Park	13,433	Recap	
7	October 31	at **Detroit Lions**	**L** 20–24	2–5	Briggs Stadium	16,174	Recap	
8	November 7	at Pittsburgh Steelers	**L** 7–38	2–6	Forbes Field	26,058	Recap	
9	November 14	at **Chicago Bears**	**L** 6–7	2–7	Wrigley Field	48,113	Recap	
10	November 21	New York Giants	**L** 3–49	2–8	State Fair Park	12,639	Recap	
11	November 28	**Los Angeles Rams**	**W** 16–0	3–8	City Stadium	23,874	Recap	
12	December 5	at **Chicago Cardinals**	**L** 7–42	3–9	Comiskey Park	26,072	Recap	
Note: Intra-division opponents are in **bold** text.

== Standings ==
NFL Western Division
	W	L	T	PCT	DIV	PF	PA	STK
Chicago Cardinals	11	1	0	.917	7–1	395	226	W10
Chicago Bears	10	2	0	.833	7–1	375	151	L1
Los Angeles Rams	6	5	1	.545	3–5	327	269	W3
Green Bay Packers	3	9	0	.250	2–6	154	290	L7
Detroit Lions	2	10	0	.167	1–7	200	407	L3

Note: Tie games were not officially counted in the standings until 1972.

== Roster ==
1948 Green Bay Packers final roster
Quarterbacks: 27 Jack Jacobs; 10 Perry Moss; Running backs: 3 Tony Canadeo CB; 17 Ed Cody K; 41 Ralph Earhart; 8 Bob Forte S; 64 Ted Fritsch K/LB; 80 Fred Provo; 7 Walt Schlinkman; 21 Ed Smith; Receivers: 23 Clyde Goodnight; 38 Nolan Luhn	Linemen/Linebackers: 33 Lloyd Baxter LB; 82 Ed Bell G/T/MG/DT; 54 Larry Craig DE; 66 Ralph Davis G/MG; 85 Don Deeks DT; 35 Bob Flowers LB/C; 72 Jim Kekeris T/DT; 47 Paul Lipscomb T/DT; 58 Ed Neal MG; 63 Urban Odson T/DT; 46 Larry Olsonoski G/MG; 44 Baby Ray T/DT; 22 Jay Rhodemyre LB/C; 15 Damon Tassos G; 79 Evan Vogds G; 43 Don Wells DE; 45 Dick Wildung T/DT	Defensive backs: 51 Irv Comp S/QB; 48 Ted Cook CB/WR; 36 Jug Girard CB/RB/P; 65 Gene Wilson CB/WR; Rookies in italics
