= John Hollar =

American football player (1922–1997)

No. 15, 36, 51
- Position: Fullback

Personal information
- Born: August 7, 1922; Boone, North Carolina, U.S.
- Died: April 9, 1997 (aged 74)
- Listed height: 6 ft 0 in (1.83 m)
- Listed weight: 223 lb (101 kg)

Career information
- College: Appalachian State
- NFL draft: 1948: 13th round, 115th overall pick

Career history
- Washington Redskins (1948); Detroit Lions (1949); Washington Redskins (1949)

Career NFL statistics
- Rushing yards: 42
- Rushing average: 2.5
- Receptions: 4
- Receiving yards: 38
- Total touchdowns: 2
- Stats at Pro Football Reference

John Henry Hollar (August 7, 1922 – April 9, 1997) was an American professional football fullback in the National Football League (NFL) for the Washington Redskins and the Detroit Lions. He played college football at Appalachian State University and was selected by the Chicago Cardinals in the thirteenth round of the 1948 NFL draft.
