= Olsonoski =

Olsonoski is a surname. Notable people with the surname include:

- Larry Olsonoski (1925–1991), American football player
- Steve Olsonoski (born 1953), known as Steve O, American wrestler
