= Shoults =

Shoults is a surname. Notable people with this surname include:

- Grant Shoults (born 1997), American swimmer
- Paul Shoults (1925–2011), American football player
