= Larry Beil (American football) =

American football player (1923–1986)

No. 72
- Position: Tackle

Personal information
- Born: October 25, 1923; Oregon City, Oregon, U.S.
- Died: October 25, 1986 (aged 63); Portland, Oregon, U.S.
- Listed height: 6 ft 2 in (1.88 m)
- Listed weight: 235 lb (107 kg)

Career information
- High school: Franklin (Portland)
- College: Portland
- NFL draft: 1948: undrafted

Career history
- New York Giants (1948)
- Stats at Pro Football Reference

Lawrence William Beil (October 25, 1923 – October 25, 1986) was an American professional football tackle who played one season with the New York Giants of the National Football League (NFL). He played college football at the University of Portland.

== Early life and college ==
Lawrence William Beil was born on October 25, 1923, in Oregon City, Oregon. He attended Franklin High School in Portland, Oregon.

Beil was on the freshman team of the Oregon State Beavers of Oregon State University in 1942. He then served in the United States Navy during World War II. He then played for the Portland Pilots of the University of Portland from 1946 to 1947.

== Professional career ==
Veil signed with the New York Giants after going undrafted in the 1948 NFL draft. He played in nine games for the Giants during the 1948 season. He wore jersey number 72 while with the Giants. Beil stood 6'2" and weighed 235 pounds.

== Personal life ==
Beio died on October 25, 1986, in Portland.
