= 1948 Boston Yanks season =

National Football League team season

- Head coach: Clipper Smith
- Home stadium: Fenway Park

Results
- Record: 3–9
- Division place: 5th NFL Eastern
- Playoffs: Did not qualify

The 1948 Boston Yanks season was their fifth in the National Football League and last as the Yanks (subsequently becoming the New York Bulldogs). The team failed to improve on their previous season's output of 4–7–1, winning only three games. They failed to qualify for the playoffs for the fifth consecutive season. This would be the final season of professional football in Boston before the Patriots began play in 1960, as a charter member of the AFL.

== NFL draft ==
1948 Boston Yanks draft
| Round | Pick | Player | Position | College | Notes |
| 1 | 5 | Vaughn Mancha | Center | Alabama | |
| 3 | 14 | John Nolan | Tackle | Penn State | |
| 5 | 29 | Bill Healy | Guard | Georgia Tech | returned to college |
| 6 | 39 | Phil Slosburg | Back | Temple | |
| 8 | 59 | Robert (Tex) Furse | Back | Yale | |
| 9 | 69 | Jim Burton | End | Wesleyan | |
| 10 | 79 | Bob Forbes | Back | Florida | |
| 11 | 89 | George Roman | Tackle | Western Reserve | |
| 12 | 99 | Abner Wimberly | End | LSU | |
| 13 | 109 | Bob Jensen | End | Iowa State | Went to Chicago Rockets (AAFC) |
| 14 | 119 | Hal (Bus) Entsminger | Back | Missouri | |
| 15 | 129 | Carmen Ragonese | Back | New Hampshire | |
| 16 | 139 | George Ratterman | Quarterback | Notre Dame | Went to Buffalo Bills (AAFC) |
| 17 | 149 | Nute Trotter | Tackle | Oklahoma | |
| 18 | 159 | Jack Mendel | End | Canisisius | |
| 19 | 169 | Mel Jowell | Guard | McMurry | |
| 20 | 179 | Frank Nelson | Back | Utes | |
| 21 | 189 | Jim Lukens | End | Washington & Lee | |
| 22 | 199 | Fran O'Brien | Back | Dartmouth | |
| 23 | 209 | Jim Zito | Tackle | Michigan State | |
| 24 | 219 | Jack Roderick | End | Yale | |
| 25 | 229 | Eddie Sikorski | Back | Muhlenberg | |
| 26 | 239 | Bruce Mather | Back | New Hampshire | |
| 27 | 249 | Jim Shoaf | Tackle | Iowa | |
| 28 | 259 | Joe McCary | Back | Virginia | |
| 29 | 269 | Al Sica | Back | Pennsylvania | |
| 30 | 279 | Harry Bonk | Back | Maryland | |
| 31 | 287 | Bernor Langsjoen | Back | Gustavus Adolphus | |
| 32 | 294 | George Neff | Back | Virginia | |
Made roster

== Schedule ==
| Game | Date | Opponent | Result | Record | Venue | Attendance | Recap | Sources |
|---|---|---|---|---|---|---|---|---|
| 1 | September 17 | Green Bay Packers | **L** 0–31 | 0–1 | Fenway Park | 15,443 | Recap | |
| 2 | September 23 | **New York Giants** | **L** 7–27 | 0–2 | Fenway Park | 7,428 | Recap | |
| 3 | October 3 | at **Pittsburgh Steelers** | **L** 14–24 | 0–3 | Forbes Field | 26,216 | Recap | |
| 4 | October 9 | at Detroit Lions | **W** 17–14 | 1–3 | Briggs Stadium | 18,747 | Recap | |
| 5 | October 17 | **Pittsburgh Steelers** | **W** 13–7 | 2–3 | Fenway Park | 7,208 | Recap | |
| 6 | October 24 | at Chicago Cardinals | **L** 27–49 | 2–4 | Comiskey Park | 23,423 | Recap | |
| 7 | October 31 | at **Washington Redskins** | **L** 21–59 | 2–5 | Griffith Stadium | 29,758 | Recap | |
| 8 | November 7 | **Washington Redskins** | **L** 7–23 | 2–6 | Fenway Park | 13,659 | Recap | |
| 9 | November 14 | at **Philadelphia Eagles** | **L** 0–45 | 2–7 | Shibe Park | 22,958 | Recap | |
| 10 | November 21 | Chicago Bears | **L** 17–51 | 2–8 | Fenway Park | 18,048 | Recap | |
| 11 | November 28 | at **New York Giants** | **L** 14–28 | 2–9 | Polo Grounds | 19,636 | Recap | |
| 12 | December 5 | **Philadelphia Eagles** | **W** 37–14 | 3–9 | Fenway Park | 9,652 | Recap | |
Note: Intra-division opponents are in **bold** text.

== Standings ==
NFL Eastern Division
| | W | L | T | PCT | DIV | PF | PA | STK |
|---|---|---|---|---|---|---|---|---|
| Philadelphia Eagles | 9 | 2 | 1 | .818 | 7–1 | 376 | 156 | W1 |
| Washington Redskins | 7 | 5 | 0 | .583 | 5–3 | 291 | 287 | W1 |
| New York Giants | 4 | 8 | 0 | .333 | 3–5 | 297 | 388 | L2 |
| Pittsburgh Steelers | 4 | 8 | 0 | .333 | 3–5 | 200 | 243 | L1 |
| Boston Yanks | 3 | 9 | 0 | .250 | 2–6 | 174 | 372 | W1 |

Note: Tie games were not officially counted in the standings until 1972.

== Roster ==
1948 Boston Yanks final roster
| Backs: 38 Bill Chipley S/WR; 10 Joe Golding CB/RB; 65 Bob Hazelhurst RB/P; 39 Gene Malinowski QB/S; 23 Frank Muehlheuser RB; 56 Frank Nelson CB/RB; 8 Bill Paschal RB; 16 Johnny Poto RB; 19 Rudy Romboli RB/S; 54 Frank Seno S/CB/RB; 66 Phil Slosburg RB; Receivers/Ends: 17 Steve Pritko WR/DE; 83 Ralph Heywood DE/WR/P; 27 Nick Scollard WR/DE/K; 55 Jim Tyree DE/WR | Linemen/Linebackers: 36 Fritz Barzilauskas G/DG; 84 Stan Batinski G/DG; 59 Bob Davis T/DT; 32 Joe Domnanovich LB/C; 40 Bill Godwin C/LB; 47 Mike Jarmoluk DT/T; 41 Vaughn Mancha C/LB; 43 Bob McClure G/DG; 14 Mike Micka LB/FB; 44 John Nolan DT/T; 31 George Roman DG/T; 21 Joe Sabasteanski DG/G; 51 Carroll Vogelaar T/DT; rookies in italics |
