= John Atwood (American football) =

American football player (1923–2008)

Profile
- Position: Halfback

Personal information
- Born: January 27, 1923; Janesville, Wisconsin, US
- Died: July 13, 2008 (aged 85); Houston, Texas, US
- Listed height: 5 ft 11 in (1.80 m)
- Listed weight: 195 lb (88 kg)

Career information
- High school: Delavan-Darien (WI)
- College: Wisconsin
- NFL draft: 1948: undrafted

Career history
- New York Giants (1948)

Career NFL statistics
- Rush attempts: 9
- Rush yards: 6
- Rush TDs: 0
- Receptions: 10
- Receiving yards: 141
- Receiving TDs: 1
- Stats at Pro Football Reference

John Horton Atwood (January 27, 1923 – July 13, 2008) was an American professional football player and company executive.
