= List of Southern Oregon Raiders in the NFL draft =

This is a list of Southern Oregon Raiders football players in the NFL draft.

== Key ==
B	Back	K	Kicker	NT	Nose tackle
C	Center	LB	Linebacker	FB	Fullback
DB	Defensive back	P	Punter	HB	Halfback
DE	Defensive end	QB	Quarterback	WR	Wide receiver
DT	Defensive tackle	RB	Running back	G	Guard
E	End	T	Offensive tackle	TE	Tight end

= Pro Bowler
= Hall of Famer

== Selections ==
Year	Round	Pick	Overall	Player	Team	Position
1948	24	5	220	Charlie DeAutremont	Los Angeles Rams	B
1975	15	12	376	Greg Enright	Cincinnati Bengals	K
1988	12	28	333	Jeff Bethard	Los Angeles Rams	WR
1991	9	7	230	Andy Katoa	San Diego Chargers	LB
