= Earthquake Smith =

American football player (1926–2009)

- Smith, 1944

No. 46, 48
- Positions: Tackle, end

Personal information
- Born: October 23, 1926; Lexington, North Carolina, U.S.
- Died: September 6, 2009 (aged 82); Lexington, North Carolina, U.S.
- Listed height: 6 ft 2 in (1.88 m)
- Listed weight: 250 lb (113 kg)

Career information
- High school: Lexington
- College: North Carolina (1944, 1947)
- NFL draft: 1948: 3rd round, 23rd overall pick

Career history
- Chicago Rockets (1948); Los Angeles Dons (1948); Baltimore Colts (1949)*; Charlotte Clippers (1949); Chicago Bears (1950)*
- * Offseason or practice squad member only

Career AAFC statistics
- Games played: 12
- Stats at Pro Football Reference

William Gerald "Earthquake" Smith (October 23, 1926 – September 6, 2009) was an American football player who played at the tackle and end positions. He played college football for North Carolina in 1944 and 1947 and served in the military in 1945 and 1946. He also played professional football in the All-America Football Conference for the Chicago Rockets and Los Angeles Dons during the 1948 season.

== Early life ==
Smith was born in 1926 at Lexington, North Carolina. He attended Lexington High School.

== College and military service ==
Smith played college football for North Carolina as a regular at the tackle position in 1944 and was rated as "one of the finest frosh athletes to ever hit the campus in a number of years." He served in the Army in 1945 and 1946 and returned to North Carolina for the 1947 season. He helped lead the 1947 North Carolina Tar Heels football team to an 8–2 and the No. 9 ranking in the final AP poll.

Smith became known by the nickname "Earthquake" due to his size (six feet, two inches, 250 pounds) and ferocity on the football field. One columnist wrote: "'Earthquake' Smith was a large and allegedly carnivorous tackle, who had been engated in a one-man wave of terror on southern football fields."

== Professional football ==
Though he was selected by the Chicago Cardinals in the third round with the 23rd overall pick of the 1948 NFL draft, Smith instead signed in January 1948 with the Cleveland Browns of the All-America Football Conference (AAFC). In August 1948, he was traded by the Browns to the Chicago Rockets in exchange for end Roy Kurrasch. Smith appeared in two games at end for the Rockets in 1948. He was then traded in September 1948 to the Los Angeles Dons in exchange for halfback Harry Clark. Smith appeared in 10 or 11 games at tackle for the Dons.

Smith was dropped by the Dons in 1949 and was also dropped by the Baltimore Colts. He returned to North Carolina and played at the guard position for the Charlotte Clippers in the Dixie League. He was cut by the Clippers in September 1949 and announced that he was quitting football to and would reenter to the University of North Carolina.

Smith signed with the Chicago Bears in March 1950. Bears coach George Halas assigned him to his "fat man's table" where players were not permitted to eat bread, butter, potatoes, starches, sweets, or deserts until they reached a desired weight. Smith did not appear in any regular-season games with the club.

== Later life ==
After his football career, Smith returned to his hometown of Lexington, North Carolina. He owned and operated Bill Smith's Paints or Bill Smith Paint & Supply in Lexington. He was in poor health for four years prior to his death in 2009 at 82 at Forsyth Medical Center in Lexington during the 1970s and 1980s.
