= Ed Smith (halfback) =

American football player (1923–2010)

No. 21, 11
- Positions: Halfback, defensive back

Personal information
- Born: July 20, 1923; Fort Monroe, Virginia, U.S.
- Died: May 18, 2010 (aged 86); El Paso, Texas, U.S.
- Listed height: 6 ft 3 in (1.91 m)
- Listed weight: 185 lb (84 kg)

Career information
- High school: San Pedro (San Pedro, California)
- College: UTEP
- NFL draft: 1948: 3rd round, 19th overall pick

Career history
- Green Bay Packers (1948–1949); New York Bulldogs (1949)

Career NFL statistics
- Rushing yards: 109
- Rushing average: 2.5
- Receptions: 12
- Receiving yards: 121
- Return yards: 425
- Stats at Pro Football Reference

Oscar Edwin Smith Jr. (July 20, 1923 – May 18, 2010) was a former fullback in the National Football League (NFL). He was drafted by the Green Bay Packers in the third round of the 1948 NFL draft and played that season with the team before splitting the following season between the Packers and the New York Bulldogs.
