= Howard Hartley =

American football player (1924–2006)

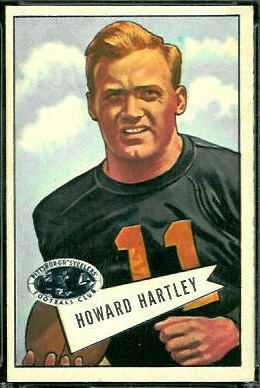
- Hartley on a 1952 Bowman football card

No. 29, 11, 20
- Position: Back

Personal information
- Born: September 26, 1924; Ravenswood, West Virginia, U.S.
- Died: September 29, 2006 (aged 82); Columbia, South Carolina, U.S.
- Listed height: 6 ft 0 in (1.83 m)
- Listed weight: 185 lb (84 kg)

Career information
- High school: Ravenswood
- College: Duke (1943, 1946–1947)
- NFL draft: 1948: undrafted

Career history
- Washington Redskins (1948); Pittsburgh Steelers (1949–1952)

Career NFL statistics
- Rushing yards: 40
- Rushing average: 8
- Receptions: 3
- Receiving yards: 37
- Interceptions: 28
- Fumble recoveries: 7
- Stats at Pro Football Reference

Howard Paul Hartley (September 26, 1924 – September 29, 2006) was an American professional football running back and defensive back in the National Football League for the Washington Redskins and the Pittsburgh Steelers.

He played college football at Duke University, on the 1943, 1946, and 1947 teams. He played in the NFL from 1948 through 1952.
