= Ed Quirk (American football) =

American football player (1925–1962)

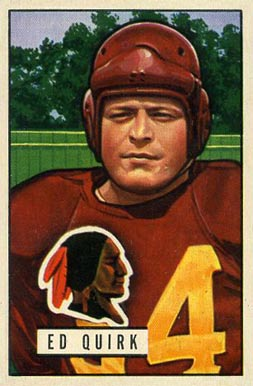
- Quirk on a 1951 Bowman football card

No. 34
- Positions: Fullback, guard, linebacker

Personal information
- Born: February 27, 1925; St. Louis, Missouri, U.S.
- Died: June 13, 1962 (aged 37); St. Louis, Missouri, U.S.
- Listed height: 6 ft 1 in (1.85 m)
- Listed weight: 231 lb (105 kg)

Career information
- High school: Saint Louis University
- College: Missouri (1944, 1947)
- NFL draft: 1948: 15th round, 128th overall pick

Career history
- Washington Redskins (1948–1951)

Awards and highlights
- Second-team All-Big Six (1947)

Career NFL statistics
- Rushing yards: 467
- Rushing average: 4
- Receptions: 14
- Receiving yards: 73
- Total touchdowns: 5
- Stats at Pro Football Reference

Edward George Quirk (February 27, 1925 – June 13, 1962) was an American professional football fullback in the National Football League (NFL) for the Washington Redskins. He played college football at the University of Missouri and was drafted in the fifteenth round of the 1948 NFL draft. He died of a heart ailment in 1962.

Representing the Missouri Tigers track and field team, Quirk won the 1945 NCAA Track and Field Championships in the shot put as well.
