= Ray Yagiello =

American football player and coach (1923–1999)

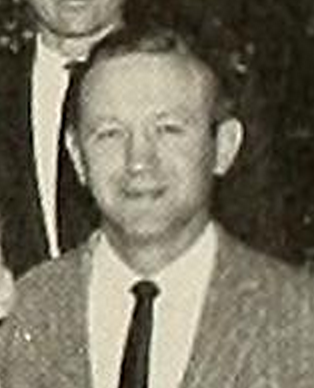

No. 54
- Positions: Guard, linebacker

Personal information
- Born: September 21, 1923; Orange, New Jersey, U.S.
- Died: June 9, 1999 (aged 75)
- Listed height: 6 ft 0 in (1.83 m)
- Listed weight: 220 lb (100 kg)

Career information
- High school: Kearny (Kearny, New Jersey)
- College: Franklin & Marshall (1943–1944); Catawba (1945–1946)
- NFL draft: 1948: 22nd round, 200th overall pick

Career history

Playing
- Los Angeles Rams (1948–1949)

Coaching
- Montclair State (1957–1959) Head coach

Awards and highlights
- Second-team Little All-American (1946)

Career NFL statistics
- Games played: 24
- Games started: 7
- Fumble recoveries: 1
- Stats at Pro Football Reference

Head coaching record
- Career: 8–14–1 (.370)

Raymond Walter Yagiello (September 21, 1923 – June 9, 1999) was an American professional football player and coach. He served the head football coach at Montclair State University in Upper Montclair, New Jersey from 1957 to 1959, compiling a record of 8–14–1. Yagiello was taken in the 1948 NFL draft by the Los Angeles Rams as the 5th pick in the 22nd round (200th overall). Yagiello had played college football at Catawba College. Prior to Catawba, Yagiello had attended Kearny High School.

== Head coaching record ==
Year	Team	Overall	Conference	Standing	Bowl/playoffs
Montclair State Indians (Independent) (1957–1959)
1957	Montclair State	3–4			
1958	Montclair State	3–4–1			
1959	Montclair State	2–6			
Montclair State:		8–14–1			
Total:		8–14–1			
