= Fred Land =

American football player (1925–1992)

No. 45
- Positions: Tackle, guard

Personal information
- Born: May 8, 1925; North Little Rock, Arkansas, U.S.
- Died: March 19, 1992 (aged 66); Denham Springs, Louisiana, U.S.
- Listed height: 6 ft 1 in (1.85 m)
- Listed weight: 220 lb (100 kg)

Career information
- High school: Little Rock Central (Little Rock, Arkansas)
- College: LSU (1943-1947)
- NFL draft: 1948: 11th round, 87th overall pick

Career history
- San Francisco 49ers (1948)

Career AAFC statistics
- Games played: 2
- Stats at Pro Football Reference

Frederick N. Land (May 8, 1925 – March 19, 1992) was an American professional football player for the San Francisco 49ers of the All-America Football Conference (AAFC). He played college football for the LSU Tigers.

Land was born in North Little Rock, Arkansas, and attended Little Rock Central High School and Louisiana State University. He was selected in the 11th round of the 1948 NFL draft by the Detroit Lions, but instead played professionally in the AAFC for the San Francisco 49ers for one season in 1948. He played in two games as a lineman that season.
