= Phil Slosburg =

American football player (1926–2018)

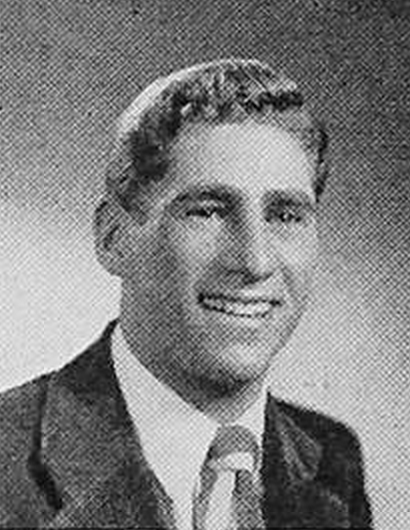
- Slosburg pictured c. 1948 at Temple University

No. 66, 86
- Position: Defensive back

Personal information
- Born: October 30, 1926; Philadelphia, Pennsylvania, U.S.
- Died: August 31, 2018 (aged 91); Philadelphia, Pennsylvania, U.S.
- Listed height: 5 ft 10 in (1.78 m)
- Listed weight: 170 lb (77 kg)

Career information
- High school: Central (Philadelphia)
- College: Temple (1945-1947)
- NFL draft: 1948: 6th round, 39th overall pick

Career history
- Boston Yanks/New York Bulldogs (1948–1949)

Career NFL statistics
- Rushing yards: 210
- Rushing average: 3
- Receptions: 6
- Receiving yards: 40
- Total touchdowns: 1
- Stats at Pro Football Reference

Phillip Jay Slosburg (October 30, 1926 – August 31, 2018) was an American professional football defensive back who played for the Boston Yanks/New York Bulldogs. He played college football at Temple University, having previously attended Central High School in Philadelphia. He was inducted into the Temple Athletics Hall of Fame in 1979.
