= Mike Katrishen =

American football player (1922–1980)

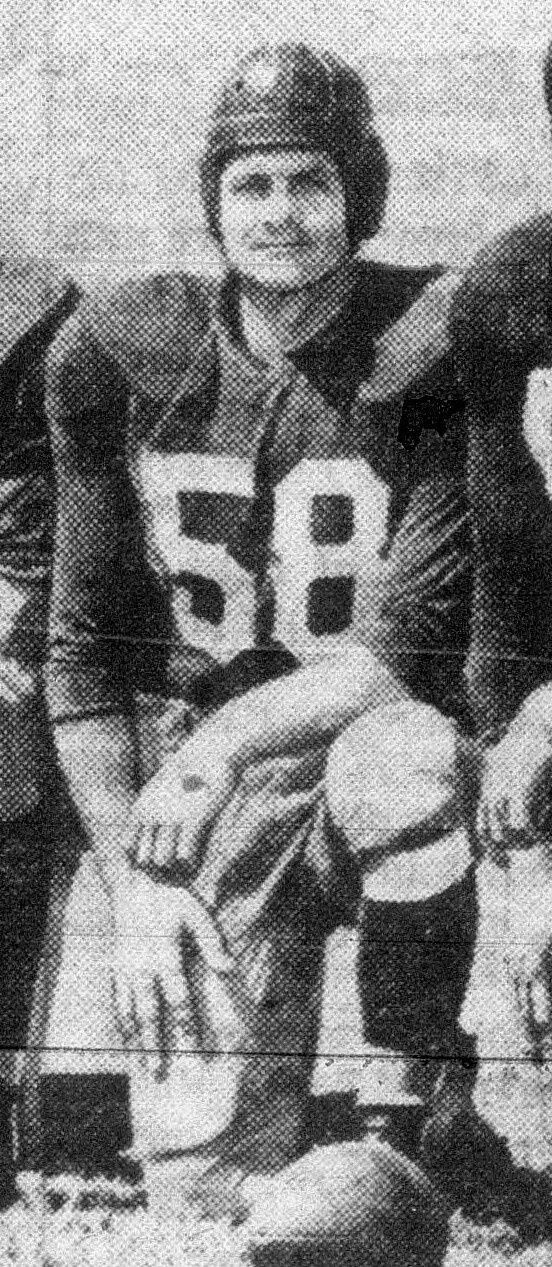
- Katrishen, circa 1949

No. 58
- Position: Guard

Personal information
- Born: May 7, 1922; Hazleton, Pennsylvania, U.S.
- Died: March 26, 1980 (aged 57)
- Listed height: 6 ft 1 in (1.85 m)
- Listed weight: 214 lb (97 kg)

Career information
- High school: Hazleton
- College: Southern Miss (1946-1947)
- NFL draft: 1948: 10th round, 78th overall pick

Career history
- Washington Redskins (1948–1949)

Career NFL statistics
- Games played: 23
- Games started: 9
- Stats at Pro Football Reference

William Michael Katrishen (May 7, 1922 – March 26, 1980) was an American professional football guard in the National Football League (NFL) for the Washington Redskins. He played college football at the University of Southern Mississippi and was drafted in the tenth round of the 1948 NFL draft.
