= Dick Woodard =

American football player (1926–2019)

No. 27, 51, 56
- Positions: Linebacker, center

Personal information
- Born: July 26, 1926; Britt, Iowa, U.S.
- Died: August 24, 2019 (aged 93); Clinton, Iowa, U.S.
- Listed height: 6 ft 2 in (1.88 m)
- Listed weight: 224 lb (102 kg)

Career information
- High school: Fort Dodge (Iowa)
- College: Iowa (1944, 1946–1948)
- NFL draft: 1948: 21st round, 186th overall pick

Career history
- Los Angeles Dons (1949); New York Giants (1950–1951); Washington Redskins (1952); New York Giants (1953)

Career NFL/AAFC statistics
- Games played: 59
- Games started: 7
- Interceptions: 6
- Fumble recoveries: 4
- Stats at Pro Football Reference

Richard Ernest Woodard (July 26, 1926 – August 24, 2019) was an American football center in the National Football League (NFL) for the New York Giants and Washington Redskins. Woodard also played in the All-America Football Conference (AAFC) for the Los Angeles Dons.

Woodward was born in Britt, Iowa. He played college football at the University of Iowa and was drafted in the 21st round of the 1948 NFL draft by the Giants. In 1948, Woodard was an honorable mention selection for the All-Big Nine team. He died on August 24, 2019, at the age of 93.
