= 1948 Detroit Lions season =

NFL team season

- Owner: Detroit Football Company
- General manager: Bo McMillin
- Head coach: Bo McMillin
- Home stadium: Briggs Stadium

Results
- Record: 2–10
- Division place: 5th NFL Western
- Playoffs: Did not qualify

The 1948 Detroit Lions season was the team's 19th overall season in the league. The team failed to improve on their previous season's output of 3–9, winning only two games. They failed to qualify for the playoffs for the 13th consecutive season. In this season they used scarlet and black uniforms instead of the traditional Honolulu blue and silver. They returned to Honolulu blue and silver the following season.

== Schedule ==
Game	Date	Opponent	Result	Record	Venue	Attendance	Recap	Sources
1	September 22	at **Los Angeles Rams**	**L** 7–44	0–1	L.A. Memorial Coliseum	17,271	Recap	
—	Bye							
2	October 3	at **Green Bay Packers**	**L** 21–33	0–2	City Stadium	24,206	Recap	
3	October 9	Boston Yanks	**L** 14–17	0–3	Briggs Stadium	18,747	Recap	
4	October 17	at **Chicago Bears**	**L** 0–28	0–4	Wrigley Field	35,425	Recap	
5	October 24	**Los Angeles Rams**	**L** 27–34	0–5	Briggs Stadium	17,444	Recap	
6	October 31	**Green Bay Packers**	**W** 24–20	1–5	Briggs Stadium	16,174	Recap	
7	November 7	at **Chicago Cardinals**	**L** 20–56	1–6	Comiskey Park	24,051	Recap	
8	November 14	at Washington Redskins	**L** 21–46	1–7	Griffith Stadium	32,528	Recap	
9	November 21	Pittsburgh Steelers	**W** 17–14	2–7	Briggs Stadium	16,189	Recap	
10	November 25	**Chicago Cardinals**	**L** 14–28	2–8	Briggs Stadium	22,957	Recap	
11	December 5	**Chicago Bears**	**L** 14–42	2–9	Briggs Stadium	27,485	Recap	
12	December 12	at Philadelphia Eagles	**L** 21–45	2–10	Shibe Park	15,322	Recap	
Note: Intra-conference opponents are in **bold** text. Thanksgiving: November 25.

== Standings ==
Program for the October 9 game against the Boston Yanks.

Left halfback "Bullet Bill" Dudley is featured on the October 31 program.

NFL Western Division
	W	L	T	PCT	DIV	PF	PA	STK
Chicago Cardinals	11	1	0	.917	7–1	395	226	W10
Chicago Bears	10	2	0	.833	7–1	375	151	L1
Los Angeles Rams	6	5	1	.545	3–5	327	269	W3
Green Bay Packers	3	9	0	.250	2–6	154	290	L7
Detroit Lions	2	10	0	.167	1–7	200	407	L3

Note: Tie games were not officially counted in the standings until 1972.

== Roster ==
1948 Detroit Lions roster
Quarterbacks: 24 Fred Enke RB/S; 22 Clyde LeForce S; Running backs: 18 Andy Dudish; 35 Bill Dudley CB; 15 Joe Margucci; 40 Charley Sarratt P; 16 Camp Wilson LB; Receivers: 87 Bob Mann; 81 John Greene DE; 83 Kelley Mote DE	Linemen/Linebackers: 65 Les Bingaman MG/G; 76 Paul Briggs T; 64 Howie Brown G; 36 Max Bumgardner DE; 60 Chuck DeShane LB; 74 Jack Dugger T/DT; 77 Dale Hansen DT; 55 Roger Harding C/LB; 70 George Hekkers DT/T; 73 Elmer Jones G/MG; 63 Bill Miklich LB/C; 57 Merv Pregulman C/LB/K; 55 Cecil Souders DE/WR; 30 Ken Roskie LB/FB; 66 Dick Stovall LB; 71 Russ Thomas T/DT; 67 Bill Ward G; 38 Bob Wiese LB	Defensive backs: 11 Jim Gillette CB/RB/S; 42 George Grimes CB/RB; 17 Mel Groomes CB/RB; 14 Joe Watt S/RB; Reserve lists: 12 Earl Maves RB (IR); 88 Ivan Schottel DE (IR); 33 Steve Sucic FB (IR); rookies in italics
