= Alan Sparkman =

American football player (1926–2010)

- Sparkman with the Los Angeles Rams (circa 1949)

No. 44, 59, 42
- Position: Tackle

Personal information
- Born: February 17, 1926; Baltimore, Maryland, U.S.
- Died: February 5, 2010 (aged 83); Baton Rouge, Louisiana, U.S.
- Listed height: 6 ft 6 in (1.98 m)
- Listed weight: 253 lb (115 kg)

Career information
- High school: Thomas Jefferson (San Antonio, Texas)
- College: Louisville

Career history
- Los Angeles Rams (1948–1949); → Richmond Rebels (1949)
- Stats at Pro Football Reference

Alan Temple Sparkman (February 17, 1926 – February 5, 2010) was an American professional football tackle who played for the Los Angeles Rams of the National Football League (NFL). He played college football for the Texas A&M Aggies and Louisville Cardinals.

== Early life ==
Alan Temple Sparkman was born on February 17, 1926, in Baltimore, Maryland. He participated in high school football and track at Thomas Jefferson High School in San Antonio, Texas. At 240 pounds, he was the heaviest player on the Associated Press all-state team his senior year in 1943. Sparkman also ran the ball sometimes, with his best run being a 40-yard touchdown. In spring 1944, he set the state record with a discus throw of 155 feet, 7 inches.

== College career ==
Sparkman enrolled at the Agricultural and Mechanical College of Texas to play college football for the Texas A&M Aggies. He was on the roster during the 1944 season but did not earn a varsity letter. On October 25, 1944, he had to leave the team to report to the United States Navy.

In 1946, Sparkman transferred to the University of Louisville to play for the Cardinals. He was a varsity letterman during the 1946 season.

In August 1947, it was reported that Sparkman would be enrolling at the University of Southern California for the 1947 season. However, this does not appear to have happened.

== Professional career ==
Sparkman signed with the Los Angeles Rams of the National Football League (NFL) in 1948. He played in all 12 games, starting two, for the Rams in 1948 as the backup to Dick Huffman. Sparkman also returned one kickoff for no yards before fumbling the ball.

On July 11, 1949, Sparkman was reported as being the largest tackle on the Rams at 6'6" and 260 pounds. On July 22, he officially signed with the team for the 1949 season. The Rams allocated Sparkman to their farm team, the Richmond Rebels of the American Association. He appeared in seven games, starting one, for the Rebels during the 1949 season. On November 15, 1949, he was recalled to the Rams. He then played in the final four games of the 1949 NFL season for Los Angeles in a reserve role and recovered one fumble. Sparkman also played in the 1949 NFL Championship Game in a backup role.

== Personal life ==
Sparkman died on February 5, 2010, in Baton Rouge, Louisiana.
