= Larry Olsonoski =

American football player (1925–1991)

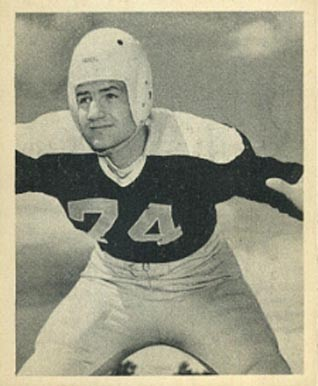
- Olsonoski on a 1948 Bowman football card

No. 46, 26
- Position: Guard

Personal information
- Born: September 10, 1925; Lancaster, Minnesota, U.S.
- Died: March 6, 1991 (aged 65); Edina, Minnesota, U.S.
- Listed height: 6 ft 2 in (1.88 m)
- Listed weight: 214 lb (97 kg)

Career information
- College: Minnesota
- NFL draft: 1948: 6th round, 41st overall pick

Career history
- Green Bay Packers (1948–1949); New York Bulldogs (1949)

Career NFL statistics
- Games played: 24
- Games started: 4
- Fumble recoveries: 2
- Stats at Pro Football Reference

Lawrence Rodney Olsonoski (September 10, 1925 – March 6, 1991) was a former guard in the National Football League (NFL). After a college career at Minnesota, he was drafted by the Green Bay Packers in the sixth round of the 1948 NFL draft and played that season with the team. The next season, he would split between the Packers and the New York Bulldogs.
