= Glenn Johnson (American football) =

American gridiron football player (1922–2001)

No. 45, 35, 31
- Position: Tackle

Personal information
- Born: June 28, 1922; Mesa, Arizona, U.S.
- Died: October 13, 2001 (aged 79); Kirkland, Washington, U.S.
- Listed height: 6 ft 4 in (1.93 m)
- Listed weight: 263 lb (119 kg)

Career information
- High school: Mesa
- College: Arizona State (1941, 1947)
- NFL draft: 1948: 10th round, 80th overall pick

Career history
- New York Yankees (1948); Erie Vets (1949); Green Bay Packers (1949); Winnipeg Blue Bombers (1950)

Awards and highlights
- CFL All-Star (1950)

Career NFL/AAFC statistics
- Games played: 17
- Stats at Pro Football Reference

Glenn Murray Johnson (June 28, 1922 – October 13, 2001) was a former player in the National Football League (NFL). Johnson played one season for the Green Bay Packers. Previously, he had played with the New York Yankees of the All-America Football Conference (AAFC).

While playing Tackle for the Green Bay Packers, Johnson scored his sole career touchdown on December 11, 1949, on a fumble recovery in the end zone during the second quarter against the Detroit Lions.

Johnson finished his career with the Winnipeg Blue Bombers of the Canadian Football League, where he was an All Star in 1950.
