= 1948 Chicago Bears season =

NFL team season

- Head coach: George Halas
- Home stadium: Wrigley Field

Results
- Record: 10–2
- Division place: 2nd NFL Western
- Playoffs: Did not qualify

The 1948 season was the Chicago Bears' 29th in the National Football League. The team improved on their 8–4 record from 1947 and finished with a 10–2 record (the teams best finish in the 3rd Halas era) under head coach George Halas, but the team finished second in the NFL Western Division yet again missing out on an NFL title game appearance.

== Schedule ==
Game	Date	Opponent	Result	Record	Venue	Attendance	Recap	Sources
2	September 26	at **Green Bay Packers**	**W** 45–7	1–0	City Stadium	25,546	Recap	
3	October 4	at **Chicago Cardinals**	**W** 28–17	2–0	Comiskey Park	52,765	Recap	
4	October 10	**Los Angeles Rams**	**W** 42–21	3–0	Wrigley Field	43,707	Recap	
5	October 17	**Detroit Lions**	**W** 28–0	4–0	Wrigley Field	35,425	Recap	
6	October 24	at Philadelphia Eagles	**L** 7–12	4–1	Shibe Park	36,227	Recap	
7	October 31	New York Giants	**W** 35–14	5–1	Wrigley Field	41,608	Recap	
8	November 7	at **Los Angeles Rams**	**W** 21–6	6–1	L.A. Memorial Coliseum	56,263	Recap	
9	November 14	**Green Bay Packers**	**W** 7–6	7–1	Wrigley Field	48,113	Recap	
10	November 21	at Boston Yanks	**W** 51–17	8–1	Fenway Park	18,048	Recap	
11	November 28	Washington Redskins	**W** 48–13	9–1	Wrigley Field	42,299	Recap	
12	December 5	at **Detroit Lions**	**W** 42–14	10–1	Briggs Stadium	27,485	Recap	
13	December 12	**Chicago Cardinals**	**L** 21–24	10–2	Wrigley Field	51,283	Recap	
Note: Intra-division opponents are in **bold** text.

== Roster ==
Chicago Bears 1948 final roster
Quarterbacks: 22 Bobby Layne; 42 Sid Luckman P; 32 Johnny Lujack S/K; Backs: 57 J. R. Boone; 30 Bill DeCorrevont; 11 Fred Evans; 9 Dick Flanagan; 39 George Gulyanics P; 6 Don Kindt; 33 Al Lawler; 5 George McAfee; 44 Frank Minini; 10 Noah Mullins; 18 Joe Osmanski	Linemen/Linebackers: 41 Alf Bauman DT/T; 82 Ray Bray G/MG; 31 Stu Clarkson OLB/C; 81 George Connor T/DT; 24 Fred Davis DT/T; 21 Chuck Drulis G/MG; 13 Thurman Garrett C; 15 Mike Holovak OLB/FB; 38 Bill Milner MLB/G; 53 Pat Preston MG/G; 23 Wash Serini DT/G; 35 Paul Stenn T/DT; 45 Walt Stickel T/DT; 66 Bulldog Turner C/OLB	Ends/Receivers: 26 Joe Abbey; 14 Ed Cifers; 51 Ken Kavanaugh; 20 Jim Keane; 16 Hank Norberg; 30 Allen Smith; 7 Ed Sprinkle; Reserve list: 8 Jim Canady CB/RB (IR); Rookies in italics

== Standings ==
Program for the November 14 home game against the arch-rival Green Bay Packers.

NFL Western Division
	W	L	T	PCT	DIV	PF	PA	STK
Chicago Cardinals	11	1	0	.917	7–1	395	226	W10
Chicago Bears	10	2	0	.833	7–1	375	151	L1
Los Angeles Rams	6	5	1	.545	3–5	327	269	W3
Green Bay Packers	3	9	0	.250	2–6	154	290	L7
Detroit Lions	2	10	0	.167	1–7	200	407	L3

Note: Tie games were not officially counted in the standings until 1972.
