= Jim Wade =

American football player (1925–2019)

No. 12
- Positions: Halfback, defensive back

Personal information
- Born: February 14, 1925; Talihina, Oklahoma, U.S.
- Died: November 20, 2019 (aged 94); Oklahoma City, Oklahoma, U.S.
- Listed height: 5 ft 11 in (1.80 m)
- Listed weight: 175 lb (79 kg)

Career information
- High school: Talihina
- College: Oklahoma City
- NFL draft: 1948: 27th round, 250th overall pick

Career history
- New York Bulldogs (1949)

Career NFL statistics
- Rushing yards: 23
- Rushing average: 2.6
- Receptions: 4
- Receiving yards: 58
- Interceptions: 1
- Stats at Pro Football Reference

James L. Wade (February 14, 1925 – November 20, 2019) was an American professional football halfback who played for the Pittsburgh Steelers. He played college football at Oklahoma City University, having previously attended Talihina High School. Wade was a veteran of World War II. He died in November 2019 at the age of 94.
