= Mike Roussos =

American football player (1926–1987)

No. 44
- Position: Offensive tackle

Personal information
- Born: February 8, 1926; New Castle, Pennsylvania, U.S.
- Died: April 6, 1987 (age 61); New Castle, Pennsylvania, U.S.

Career information
- College: Pittsburgh

Career history
- 1948–1949: Washington Redskins
- 1949: Detroit Lions
- Stats at Pro Football Reference

Michael Christ Roussos (February 8, 1926 – April 6, 1987) was an American football offensive tackle in the National Football League for the Washington Redskins and the Detroit Lions. He played college football at the University of Pittsburgh.
