= Harry Gilmer =

American football player (1926–2016)

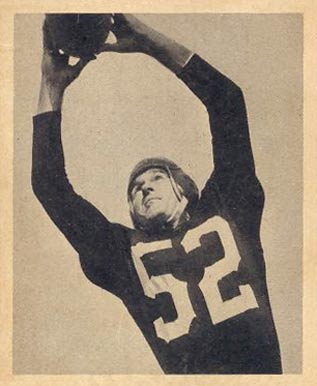
- Gilmer on a 1948 Bowman card

No. 52, 12
- Positions: Quarterback, halfback, defensive back

Personal information
- Born: April 14, 1926; Birmingham, Alabama, U.S.
- Died: August 20, 2016 (aged 90); St. Louis, Missouri, U.S.
- Listed height: 6 ft 0 in (1.83 m)
- Listed weight: 169 lb (77 kg)

Career information
- High school: Woodlawn (Birmingham)
- College: Alabama (1944-1947)
- NFL draft: 1948: 1st round, 1st overall pick

Career history

Playing
- Washington Redskins (1948–1954); Detroit Lions (1955–1956)

Coaching
- Pittsburgh Steelers (1957–1960) Assistant coach; Minnesota Vikings (1961–1964) Assistant coach; Detroit Lions (1965–1966) Head coach; St. Louis Cardinals (1967–1969) Quarterbacks coach; Atlanta Falcons (1970–1974) Receivers coach; St. Louis Cardinals (1975–1982) Quarterbacks coach

Awards and highlights
- 2× Pro Bowl (1950, 1952); First-team All-American (1945); Second-team All-American (1947); Third-team All-American (1946); SEC Player of the Year (1945); 4× First-team All-SEC (1944, 1945, 1946, 1947); 1946 Rose Bowl MVP; Alabama Sports Hall of Fame (1973)

Career NFL statistics
- Passing attempts: 579
- Passing completions: 263
- Completion percentage: 45.4%
- TD–INT: 23–45
- Passing yards: 3,786
- Passer rating: 48
- Rushing yards: 928
- Defensive interceptions: 5
- Stats at Pro Football Reference
- Coaching profile at Pro Football Reference
- College Football Hall of Fame

Harry Vincent Gilmer Jr. (April 14, 1926 – August 20, 2016) was an American professional football player who was a halfback and quarterback in the National Football League (NFL) for the Washington Redskins and Detroit Lions. He played college football for the Alabama Crimson Tide and was inducted into the College Football Hall of Fame in 1993.

== Early life ==
Born in Birmingham, Alabama, Gilmer attended and played high school football at its Woodlawn High School. He often utilized the technique of leaping high into the air to pass the ball because, as a child, he often played pickup games with teammates who were much older and thus taller than he was; Gilmer was then one of the first players to popularize the "jump pass" when he continued using the technique at the collegiate level.

== College career ==
After high school, Gilmer played college football at the University of Alabama, where he was the left halfback from 1944 to 1947. As a freshman, he was 8 for 8 in passing attempts during a loss against Duke University in the Sugar Bowl. Gilmer's best year was his sophomore season, when he led the nation in touchdown passes–thirteen–and he ran for nine touchdowns. He had 79 rushing attempts with an average gain of 7.0 yards and a passing percentage of .648 on 88 attempts. His total offense, 1,457 yards, was second in the nation. Gilmer also spent time as a punter and kickoff returner and, in his junior year, he returned 37 punts; his average, 14.5 yards, led the nation.

During the 1945 season, Gilmer led Alabama to the Rose Bowl, where they beat the University of Southern California 34–14. In his career, Gilmer passed for 26 touchdowns and ran for 24. He passed for 2,894 yards and rushed for 1,673. His punting average was 36.4 yards. He averaged 28.7 yards on kickoff returns, 13.5 on punt returns. He twice finished fifth in the voting for the Heisman Trophy in both 1945 and 1947.

== Professional career ==
Gilmer was the first overall pick in the 1948 NFL draft, selected by the Washington Redskins, where he played from 1948 to 1954. He then was traded to the Detroit Lions for Bert Zagers and Bob Trout, where he played in 1955 and 1956 under head coach Buddy Parker.

== Later life and death ==
After retiring as a player, Gilmer became an assistant coach with the Pittsburgh Steelers under Parker in 1957. After four years there and four with the Minnesota Vikings under Norm Van Brocklin, he succeeded George Wilson as Lions head coach in January 1965. His two-year record of 10–16–2 (.393) included a 4–9–1 1966 campaign. His unpopularity with Lions fans reached a climax after a 28–16 loss to the Minnesota Vikings at Tiger Stadium in the regular season finale on December 11, when he was pelted with snowballs while exiting the field. He was fired in early January 1967, succeeded by assistant coach Joe Schmidt.

Gilmer was inducted into the Alabama Sports Hall of Fame in 1973 and the College Football Hall of Fame in 1993. In 1999, Sports Illustrated named him the 37th greatest Alabama sports figure. Gilmer died on August 20, 2016, at the age of 90. Until his death, he lived in St. Louis along with his children, grandchildren, and great-grandchildren.

== See also ==
- List of NCAA major college yearly punt and kickoff return leaders

== Sources ==
- Groom, Winston. The Crimson Tide – An Illustrated History. Tuscaloosa: The University of Alabama Press, 2000. ISBN 0-8173-1051-7.
