= Rex Grossman Sr. =

American football player (1924–1980)

- Grossman in 1948

No. 81, 74
- Positions: Fullback, linebacker

Personal information
- Born: February 5, 1924; Huntington, Indiana, U.S.
- Died: June 13, 1980 (aged 56); Bloomington, Indiana, U.S.
- Listed height: 6 ft 1 in (1.85 m)
- Listed weight: 215 lb (98 kg)

Career information
- High school: Huntington North
- College: Indiana (1942, 1946–1947)
- NFL draft: 1948: 29th round, 273rd overall pick

Career history
- Baltimore Colts (1948–1950); Detroit Lions (1950)

Career NFL/AAFC statistics
- Field goals made: 16
- Field goal attempts: 32
- Field goal %: 50
- Punts: 28
- Punt yards: 1,087
- Interceptions: 2
- Stats at Pro Football Reference

Rex Daniel Grossman Sr. (February 5, 1924 – June 13, 1980) was an American football fullback and linebacker who played for two seasons in the All-America Football Conference (AAFC) and one season in the National Football League (NFL).

== Biography ==
Rex Grossman was born February 5, 1924, in Huntington, Indiana.

After playing college football for Indiana, he was drafted by the Philadelphia Eagles in the twenty-ninth round of the 1948 NFL draft. He played for the Baltimore Colts of the AAFC from 1948 to 1949, until they merged with the NFL in 1950, and for the Detroit Lions of the NFL in 1950.

His grandson and namesake, Rex Grossman, is a former NFL quarterback who played for 11 seasons in the league and started for the Chicago Bears in Super Bowl XLI.
