= Harry Bonk =

American football player (1926–2011)

Profile
- Position: Fullback

Personal information
- Born: April 16, 1926; Coram, New York, U.S.
- Died: December 24, 2011 (aged 85); Milton, Delaware, U.S.

Career information
- College: Dartmouth (1944); Bucknell (1944); Maryland (1945–1948)
- NFL draft: 1948: 28th round, 279 by the Boston Yanksth overall pick

Harry Bonk (April 16, 1926 – December 24, 2011) was an American football player. He played college football as a fullback for the University of Maryland from 1945 to 1948, and for Dartmouth College and Bucknell University in 1944. The Boston Yanks selected Bonk in the 28th round of the 1948 NFL draft.

== Biography ==
Bonk was born on April 16, 1926, in Coram, New York to parents Paul and Louise (née Kalenewcz) Bonk. He attended Dartmouth College and enlisted in the United States Navy on March 1, 1944. Bonk participated in the V-12 Navy training program at Dartmouth, and in November 1944 transferred to Bucknell University, where he continued his naval training. He played college football as a fullback at both Dartmouth and Bucknell during the 1944 season. A week before his transfer, he was credited with "sparking" the Dartmouth Indians to a victory over Brown. He scored a fourth quarter go-ahead touchdown in the 14–13 victory.

He later trained at North Carolina Pre-Flight. Upon the conclusion of World War II, many of the V-12 cadets were given the opportunity to get out of the Navy. Bonk was discharged on September 18, 1945, at Shelton, Virginia without having served overseas. Bear Bryant convinced a group of 20 former V-12 cadets to enroll at the University of Maryland to play for his football team, where Bonk played from 1945 to 1948. During a practice session in November 1948, he suffered a back injury which "quickly dispelled" the "air of optimism that seemed to emanate from Coach Jim Tatum". The injury proved minor, however, and he was cleared for action in the following game against the Charlie Justice led North Carolina team. In that game, Bonk broke free for a 76-yard run on the first Maryland possession to set up a touchdown, but the Terrapins eventually fell, 49–20. He led the team in scoring that season with five touchdowns.

Bonk also competed on the boxing team in the heavyweight class while at Maryland. He was a member of Theta Chi and Sigma Nu. He earned a Bachelor of Science in education in 1946, and a Master of Science in education in 1949.

On December 5, 1948, Bonk played on the College All-Stars against the Charlotte Clippers of the Dixie League. He scored a touchdown in the collegians' 30–21 loss. On December 25, he played on the South squad in the Blue–Gray Football All-Star Game. The Boston Yanks selected Bonk with the fourth pick of the 28th round in the 1948 NFL draft.
