= Bob Levenhagen =

Canadian football player (1925–1973)

No. 54
- Positions: Tackle, Guard

Personal information
- Born: October 2, 1925; Tacoma, Washington, U.S.
- Died: September 16, 1973 (aged 47); Washington, U.S.
- Listed height: 6 ft 0 in (1.83 m)
- Listed weight: 230 lb (104 kg)

Career information
- College: Washington
- NFL draft: 1948: 25th round, 230th overall pick

Career history
- 1953: Calgary Stampeders
- 1954–1955: BC Lions

Awards and highlights
- 2× First-team All-PCC (1947, 1948)

Robert Ernest Levenhagen (October 2, 1925 – September 16, 1973) was an American professional football player who played for the BC Lions and Calgary Stampeders. He played college football at the University of Washington.
