= Bill Schroll =

American football player (1926–2009)

No. 72, 36, 86
- Positions: Linebacker, fullback

Personal information
- Born: January 24, 1926; Alexandria, Louisiana, U.S.
- Died: February 24, 2009 (aged 83); Baton Rouge, Louisiana, U.S.
- Listed height: 6 ft 0 in (1.83 m)
- Listed weight: 214 lb (97 kg)

Career information
- High school: Jesuit (New Orleans, Louisiana)
- College: LSU (1943, 1946–1948)
- NFL draft: 1948: 14th round, 120th overall pick

Career history
- Buffalo Bills (1949); Detroit Lions (1950); Green Bay Packers (1951)

Career NFL/AAFC statistics
- Interceptions: 2
- Rushing yards: 1
- Rushing average: 1
- Stats at Pro Football Reference

Charles William Schroll Jr. (January 24, 1926 – February 24, 2009) was an American football linebacker in the National Football League. He was drafted in the fourteenth round of the 1948 NFL draft by the Los Angeles Rams and later played with the Detroit Lions during the 1950 NFL season. The following season, he played with the Green Bay Packers. He also played with the Buffalo Bills of the All-America Football Conference in 1949.
