= Paul Shoults =

American football player (1925–2011)

No. 15
- Position: Halfback

Personal information
- Born: October 9, 1925; Washington Court House, Ohio, U.S.
- Died: August 20, 2011 (aged 85); Granger, Indiana, U.S.
- Listed height: 5 ft 11 in (1.80 m)
- Listed weight: 178 lb (81 kg)

Career information
- High school: Washington (Washington Court House)
- College: Miami (OH) (1943, 1946–1948)
- NFL draft: 1948: 25th round, 235th overall pick

Career history
- New York Bulldogs (1949)

Career NFL statistics
- Rushing yards: 124
- Rushing average: 2.7
- Receptions: 10
- Receiving yards: 124
- Return yards: 298
- Stats at Pro Football Reference

Paul Shoults (October 9, 1925 – August 20, 2011) was an American professional football halfback. He played for the New York Bulldogs in 1949.

He died on August 20, 2011, in Granger, Indiana at age 85.
