= George Grimes (American football) =

American football player (1922–1971)

No. 42
- Positions: Defensive back, wingback

Personal information
- Born: July 3, 1922; Jewell Ridge, Virginia, U.S.
- Died: April 28, 1971 (aged 48)
- Listed height: 5 ft 11 in (1.80 m)
- Listed weight: 190 lb (86 kg)

Career information
- High school: Tazewell (Tazewell, Virginia)
- College: North Carolina; Virginia
- NFL draft: 1948: 6th round, 40th overall pick

Career history
- Detroit Lions (1948)

Career NFL statistics
- Punts: 28
- Punt yards: 1,006
- Longest punt: 56
- Stats at Pro Football Reference

George Grimes (July 3, 1922 – April 28, 1971) was an American professional football wide receiver who played for the Detroit Lions during the 1948 season.

== Biography ==
=== Early life and education ===
Grimes was born on July 3, 1922. He attended Tazewell High School in Virginia, where he played on the basketball and football teams. After high school, he played football for the University of Virginia. Before he completed his studies, however, he joined the US Marines as a second lieutenant fighting in World War II. After combat, he returned to the University of Virginia and continued playing football.

=== Career and later life ===
After college, Grimes was drafted by the Los Angeles Rams and the Buffalo Bills, but instead played for the Detroit Lions. He played in nine games for the Lions during the 1948 season, after which he retired from professional football. Grimes died on April 28, 1971.
