= Bruce Gehrke =

American football player (1924–1976)

Bob Gehrke
No. 83
- Position: End

Personal information
- Born: September 12, 1924; Long Island, New York, USA
- Died: April 6, 1976 (aged 51); Mineola, New York, U.S.
- Listed height: 6 ft 2 in (1.88 m)
- Listed weight: 190 lb (86 kg)

Career information
- High school: Sewanhaka (Floral Park, New York)
- College: Columbia
- NFL draft: 1948: 4th round, 24th overall pick

Career history
- New York Giants (1948)

Career NFL statistics
- Receptions: 9
- Receiving yards: 109
- Touchdowns: 1
- Stats at Pro Football Reference

Bruce Gehrke (September 12, 1924 – April 6, 1976) was a three sport star Ivy League Hall of Famer, former professional football player for New York Giants in the National Football League (NFL) and a winning coach. He won national championship (NCAA) titles in Baseball, Basketball and Football with the Columbia Lions where he was the most valuable and popular player.

== Early life ==
Gehrke was born in Long Island, New York and attended Sewanhaka High School in Floral Park, Long Island before attending Columbia University in September 1942. In his first year, he starred on the varsity football, basketball and baseball teams.

The following year, Gehrke played shortstop for Columbia’s 1944 championship baseball team, while training for the Navy. Hugely popular among his teammates and fellow students, Gehrke had that intangible flair for color that made him a crowd pleaser. His play, in every sport, was daring and spectacular, yet he was as crafty a competitor as anyone could have been. Gehrke was also the coach of his fraternity basketball team in intramural play. He took a break from college when he spent a year with the Navy overseas in Okinawa during World War II. He returned to Columbia for his junior year in September 1946.

== Twelve Varsity Letters and Hall of Fame ==
Gehrke earned 12 varsity letters at Columbia University, competing in football, basketball and baseball.[2] In his senior year, he contributed to Columbia’s 21–20 victory over Army. He graduated in 1948, having been part of teams that won one baseball league title and two basketball league titles.

On October 2, 2008 Gehrke was inducted into hall of fame as a three sport star for the Columbia Lions.

== National Football League ==
Gehrke eventually went on to play for his hometown New York Giants in National Football League and later became a winning coach for over 25 years coaching high school football, basketball, and baseball at Mineola, on his native Long Island. Gehrke was drafted by New York Giants in the 4th round (24th overall) of the 1948 NFL draft.
