= Gene Malinowski =

American football player (1923–1993)

- Malinowski in 1949

No. 39
- Positions: Quarterback, center, linebacker

Personal information
- Born: September 26, 1923; Hamtramck, Michigan, U.S.
- Died: November 24, 1993 (aged 70); Clinton Township, Macomb County, Michigan, U.S.
- Listed height: 6 ft 1 in (1.85 m)
- Listed weight: 210 lb (95 kg)

Career information
- High school: Hamtramck
- College: Georgia; Detroit Mercy
- NFL draft: 1947: 9th round, 67th overall pick

Career history
- Boston Yanks (1948)

Career NFL statistics
- Passing yards: 218
- TD–INT: 3-7
- Passer rating: 22.8
- Stats at Pro Football Reference

Eugene Paul Malinowski (September 26, 1923 – November 24, 1993) was an American professional football player.

Malinowski played college football for the University of Detroit Titans football team from 1945 to 1947. He began his college football career as a center in 1945, but was switched in 1946 to quarterback by Detroit head coach Chuck Baer. He also played for Detroit's basketball team.

He was selected by the Boston Yanks in the ninth round with the 67th overall pick in the 1947 NFL draft. He appeared in 12 games, two as a starter, for the 1948 Boston team. Initially drafted as a center and linebacker, he was used by the Yanks as an offensive "T" quarterback. After the 1948 season, he was traded to the Detroit Lions.

In August 1949, Malinowski was hired as assistant coach of the football team at St. Florian High School in Hamtramck.

Malinowski later operated Eutectic Engineering, a subcontractor for automobile companies. He died in 1993 of congenital heart disease at St. Joseph Mercy Hospital in Clinton Township, Macomb County, Michigan.
