= George Kisiday =

American football player (1923–1970)

No. 51, 81
- Positions: End, tackle

Personal information
- Born: April 16, 1923; Ambridge, Pennsylvania, U.S.
- Died: November 9, 1970 (aged 47); Ambridge, Pennsylvania, U.S.
- Listed height: 5 ft 11 in (1.80 m)
- Listed weight: 210 lb (95 kg)

Career information
- High school: Ambridge (PA)
- College: Duquesne; Columbia
- NFL draft: 1948: 22nd round, 196th overall pick

Career history
- Buffalo Bills (1948); Jersey City Giants (1949)

Career AAFC statistics
- Receptions: 1
- Receiving yards: 20
- Stats at Pro Football Reference

George John Kisiday (April 16, 1923 – November 8, 1970) was an American football player who played at the end position. He played college football for Duquesne and Columbia and professional football for the Buffalo Bills and Jersey City Giants.

== Early life ==
Kisiday was born in 1923 in Ambridge, Pennsylvania. He attended and played football at Ambridge High School.

== College football and military service ==
Kisiday played college football for Duquesne at the end position in 1942 and 1947. His college career was interrupted by service in the United States Army during World War II. He transferred to Columbia in 1947 and played at the tackle position for Lou Little's 1947 Columbia Lions football team that was ranked No. 20 in the final AP Poll.

== Professional football ==
Kisiday was selected by the New York Giants in the 22nd round (196th overall pick) of the 1947 NFL draft but did not play for them. He instead signed in February 1948 to play for the Buffalo Bills of the All-America Football Conference (AAFC). He was recommended to the Bills by Columbia coach Little. He played for the Bills during their 1948 season and appeared in 14 games. He also played in the American Football League for the Jersey City Giants in 1949.

== Family and later years ==
After his playing career ended, he was hired as an assistant football coach at North Catholic High School in Pittsburgh. He later served as the line coach at the University of Bridgeport. After his coaching career, he served as the recreation director in Ambridge.

Kisiday suffered a heart attack in 1962. He subsequently died of an apparent heart attack in 1970 at age 47 in Ambridge.
