= Jack Kurkowski =

American football player (1922–2005)

Detroit Titans
- Positions: Fullback, halfback

Personal information
- Born: September 28, 1922; Detroit, Michigan, U.S.
- Died: March 14, 2005 (age 82); Royal Oak, Michigan, U.S.
- Listed height: 5 ft 11 in (1.80 m)
- Listed weight: 190 lb (86 kg)

Career information
- High school: St. Rita High School

Awards and highlights
- NCAA yards per carry leader, 1947

John Edward Kurkowski (September 28, 1922 – March 14, 2005) was an American college football player.

Kurkowski was born in 1922 in Detroit. He attended St. Rita High School in Detroit, earning a total of seven varsity letters in football, basketball, baseball, and tennis. He was named to the Detroit Free Press all-state football team in 1940.

Kurkowski enrolled at the University of Detroit in 1941, but his collegiate career was interrupted by World War II. He served in the United States Navy and attained the rank of ensign. He was discharged from the Navy late in 1945 and returned to the University of Detroit in the fall of 1946. He played college football for the Detroit Titans football team, tallying 300 rushing yards and 171 passing yards as a sophomore in 1946. As a junior in 1947, he gained 614 rushing yards on 61 carries to lead the NCAA major college backs with an average of 10.07 rushing yards per carry. He ran 80 yards for touchdown against Duquesne in October 1947. He also played at the safety position on defense and was selected as most valuable player on the Titans' 1947 football team and co-captain of the 1948 team. For his college career, Kurkowski gained 1,315 yards on 192 carries for an average of 6.9 yards per carry.

In December 1948, Kurkowski signed with the New York Yankees of the All-America Football Conference. he participated in the Yankees' summer training camp, but his professional career was cut short by a foot injury in August 1949.

Kurkowski was inducted into the Detroit Titans Hall of Fame in 1982. He lived in Royal Oak, Michigan, for 55 years and died in 2005 at age 82.
