= 1948 Chicago Cardinals season =

American football team season

- Owner: Violet Bidwill Wolfner
- Head coach: Jimmy Conzelman
- Home stadium: Comiskey Park

Results
- Record: 11–1
- Division place: 1st Western
- Playoffs: Lost NFL Championship (at Eagles) 0–7

The 1948 Chicago Cardinals season was the 29th season in franchise history. The Cardinals won the Western division on the final weekend at Wrigley Field over the cross-town Bears, and appeared in the NFL championship game for the second consecutive year. The defending champions lost 7–0 to the Eagles in a snowstorm in Philadelphia. It was their final postseason appearance as a Chicago team; they relocated southwest to St. Louis in 1960. It would also mark the franchise's last appearance in a league championship game for 60 years until the 2008 Arizona Cardinals advanced to Super Bowl XLIII, which they ultimately lost to another Pennsylvania-based team, this time the Pittsburgh Steelers.

The Cardinals scored 395 points (32.9 per game) in 1948, the most in the ten-team NFL, and the second most all-time in a 12-game season. They also led the league in offensive yards, yards per play, rushing yards and rushing touchdowns. The team's plus-169 point-differential remains the best in franchise history.

== Background ==
The 1948 NFL season produced more points-per-game per team than any other season, and according to Cold Hard Football Facts:

"Jimmy Conzelman's Chicago Cardinals were the best of the bunch. They led the NFL in scoring that year (32.9 [points-per-game]) and they produced what was probably the greatest four-week stretch of offense in pro football history. From October 17 to November 7, the 1948 Cardinals beat the Giants 63–35; the Boston Yanks, 49–27; the L.A. Rams 27–22; and the Lions, 56–20. That's a four-week average of 48.8 [points-per-game] for those of you keeping score at home.

"Yes, turnovers were common in 1948, so maybe that fact made life easier for offense. The Cardinals, for example, picked off 23 passes in 12 games. But they scored just two defensive touchdowns all year, while adding four on special teams. Mostly, they ripped off touchdowns, a remarkable 47 on offense. They kicked a mere eight field goals.

"Mostly, the offense was virtually unstoppable and it didn't settle often for the cheap, soccer-style field goals that pad offensive team totals today."

The Cardinals had three players in the top six in rushing in 1948: halfbacks Charley Trippi (690 yards), and Elmer Angsman (638), and fullback/linebacker/placekicker Pat Harder (554). Harder led the league in scoring in 1948, with 110 points (6 rushing touchdowns, 7 field goals, and 53 extra points). He was named the league's MVP by United Press International.

This was the Cardinals' last playoff game until 1974, although they did win the third place Playoff Bowl in Miami over Vince Lombardi's Green Bay Packers in January 1965. The Cardinals' next appearance in an NFL championship game was sixty years later in Super Bowl XLIII in January 2009.

== Regular season ==
=== Schedule ===
Game	Date	Opponent	Result	Record	Venue	Attendance	Recap	Sources
1	September 24	Philadelphia Eagles	**W** 21–14	1–0	Comiskey Park	25,875	Recap	
2	October 4	**Chicago Bears**	**L** 17–28	1–1	Comiskey Park	52,765	Recap	
3	October 10	at **Green Bay Packers**	**W** 17–7	2–1	State Fair Park	34,369	Recap	
4	October 17	at New York Giants	**W** 63–35	3–1	Polo Grounds	35,584	Recap	
5	October 24	Boston Yanks	**W** 49–27	4–1	Comiskey Park	23,423	Recap	
6	October 31	at **Los Angeles Rams**	**W** 27–22	5–1	L.A. Memorial Coliseum	32,149	Recap	
7	November 7	**Detroit Lions**	**W** 56–20	6–1	Comiskey Park	24,051	Recap	
8	November 14	at Pittsburgh Steelers	**W** 24–7	7–1	Forbes Field	33,364	Recap	
9	November 21	**Los Angeles Rams**	**W** 27–24	8–1	Comiskey Park	29,031	Recap	
10	November 25	at **Detroit Lions**	**W** 28–14	9–1	Briggs Stadium	22,957	Recap	
11	December 5	**Green Bay Packers**	**W** 42–7	10–1	Comiskey Park	26,072	Recap	
12	December 12	at **Chicago Bears**	**W** 24–21	11–1	Wrigley Field	51,283	Recap	
Note: Intra-division opponents are in **bold** text. Thanksgiving Day: November 25

== Standings ==
Program for the November 21 game against the visiting Los Angeles Rams.

NFL Western Division
	W	L	T	PCT	DIV	PF	PA	STK
Chicago Cardinals	11	1	0	.917	7–1	395	226	W10
Chicago Bears	10	2	0	.833	7–1	375	151	L1
Los Angeles Rams	6	5	1	.545	3–5	327	269	W3
Green Bay Packers	3	9	0	.250	2–6	154	290	L7
Detroit Lions	2	10	0	.167	1–7	200	407	L3

Note: Tie games were not officially counted in the standings until 1972.

== Postseason ==
=== NFL Championship Game ===
The 1948 NFL championship game was the sixteenth NFL title game and a rematch of the previous year's game between the Chicago Cardinals of the Western Division and the Eastern Division's Philadelphia Eagles. It was played at Philadelphia's Shibe Park on December 19 and the host Eagles won 7–0 in the snow.

Week	Date	Opponent	Result	Record	Venue	Attendance
Championship	December 19	at Philadelphia Eagles	L 0–7	0–1	Shibe Park	36,309 (paid), 28,864 (actual)

== Personnel ==
=== Staff / Coaches ===
1948 Chicago Cardinals staff
Front Office: Principal / Majority Owner – Violet Bidwill Wolfner; General Manager – Ray Bennigsen; Coaching staff: Head Coach – Jimmy Conzelman; Assistant Coaches: Assistant Coach - Buddy Parker; Assistant Coach - Dick Plasman; Assistant / Line Coach - Phil Handler	Special Teams Coaches: None - N/A

=== Roster ===
1948 Chicago Cardinals final roster
Quarterbacks: 44 Paul Christman; 22 Ray Mallouf P; 49 Charley Eikenberg; Running backs: 7 Elmer Angsman; 87 Babe Dimancheff; 34 Pat Harder K; 37 Vic Schwall; 62 Charley Trippi P/S; 33 Vinnie Yablonski K; Receivers: 41 Billy Dewell; 80 Malcolm Kutner CB; 61 Bob Ravensberg DE	Linemen/Linebackers: 68 Plato Andros MG/G; 75 Ray Apolskis G/MG; 76 Loyd Arms G/MG; 82 John Badaczewski G/MG; 32 Vince Banonis LB/C; 57 Bill Blackburn LB/C; 11 Chet Bulger T/DT; 53 Bill Campbell C/LB; 67 Corwin Clatt LB/FB; 55 Jake Colhouer G; 50 Joe Coomer DT/T; 66 Jack Doolan DE; 42 Bob Dove DE; 70 Sam Goldman DE; 64 Dick Loepfe T/DT; 73 Hamilton Nichols G; 20 Buster Ramsey G/LB; 36 Walt Szot T/DT; 15 Bob Zimny T/DT	Defensive backs: 24 Red Cochran S/P; 31 Jerry Davis CB/RB; 99 Marshall Goldberg CB; 17 Bob Hanlon CB/RB; rookies in italics

== Awards and records ==
- Led NFL, Points Scored, 395
- Led NFL, Total Yards Gained, 4,705
- Led NFL, Rushing Yards, 2,560
- Pat Harder, NFL Scoring Leader, 110 points
