= Travis Raven =

American football coach and athletic director (1922–2004)

Travis Roland Raven (August 31, 1922 – May 11, 2004) was an American football coach. He built John H. Reagan High School of Austin into a Texas high school football powerhouse, winning 4A state championships in 1967, 1968 and 1970. His record at Reagan was 62–10–1 which included a 35-game winning streak from 1967 to 1969. He was chosen as the Texas High School Coach of the Year in 1969. Previously, he had coached at Lockhart High School and Austin High School (Austin, Texas), where he guided the Maroons to the state baseball championship in 1958.

Raven was born and raised in Austin, Texas, where he attended Austin High School. In 1940, he was a member of the State Junior College Championship Team at Schreiner Institute. He entered the University of Texas at Austin in 1941 and graduated in 1948, with service in the United States Army Air Forces from 1943 to 1946. While at University of Texas, he played football and was on one conference championship team and two winning Bowl teams.

Raven took over as the Austin school district's athletic director in 1974. This was after a highly publicized scandal in which he faced a felony charge of "compelling prostitution with a minor." He was accused of inducing a 16-year-old girl into prostitution with several prominent men named as clients. He was convicted of the lesser misdemeanor offense of engaging in prostitution and fined two hundred dollars.
