= 1948 NFL season =

American football season

Regular season
- Duration: September 17 – December 19, 1948
- East Champions: Philadelphia Eagles
- West Champions: Chicago Cardinals

Championship Game
- Champions: Philadelphia Eagles

NFL teams: West, East

The 1948 NFL season was the 29th regular season of the National Football League. During the season, Halfback Fred Gehrke painted horns on the Los Angeles Rams' helmets, making the first modern helmet emblem in pro football. The last regular season game played on Wednesday until the 2012 season happened on September 22, 1948, between Detroit and Los Angeles. The season ended when the Philadelphia Eagles defeated the Chicago Cardinals in the NFL Championship Game.

The 1948 season featured the highest per-game, per-team scoring in NFL history, with the average team scoring 23.2 points per game. This record stood for 65 years until 2013.

== Draft ==
The 1948 NFL draft was held on December 19, 1947, at Pittsburgh's Fort Pitt Hotel. With the first pick, the Washington Redskins selected halfback Harry Gilmer from the University of Alabama.

== Major rule changes ==
- Plastic helmets are prohibited. This rule was enacted because critics argued that they were being used more as a weapon than protection.
- A flexible artificial tee is permitted at the kickoff.
- When the intended passer is tackled behind the line of scrimmage, the game clock will stop temporarily until any receivers who have gone down field have had a reasonable time to return.
- When the offense is called for delay of game, the defense may decline the 5-yard distance penalty.
- If a foul occurs behind the line during a backwards pass or fumble, the penalty is enforced from the spot of the pass or fumble.
- It is illegal to bat or punch the ball while it is in a player's possession.
- All officials are equipped with whistles, not horns.

== Deaths ==
- September 24 - Stan Mauldin, age 27. Played tackle for the Chicago Cardinals from 1946-1948. Died from a heart attack after a game against Philadelphia Eagles.

== Division races ==
In the Eastern race, the Eagles demolished Washington 45–0 in Week Five to take a ½ game lead. When the 6–1–1 Eagles met the 6–2 Skins again in Week Ten, they beat Washington 42–21, and won the Division and the right to host the Championship Game.

The other race was all Chicago, with the Cardinals and Bears both having records of 10–1 going into the final week: thus, there was a de facto playoff game for the Western Division for the second year in succession, with a tie forcing a second playoff game the following week.

A record crowd of 51,283 attended Wrigley Field on December 12 for the all-Chicago showdown, with the Bears taking a 21–10 lead on George Gulyanics' touchdown at the start of the fourth quarter. Charley Trippi's touchdown cut the margin to 21–17, but the Bears had the ball and time on their side. The turning point came when the Cards' Vince Banonis picked off a pass from Johnny Lujack and ran the ball back to the Bears' 19. Elmer Angsman scored a touchdown three plays later to win the game and the Western Division title for the Cards, as well as the right to face the Eagles for the Championship.

== Final standings ==
NFL Eastern Division
	W	L	T	PCT	DIV	PF	PA	STK
Philadelphia Eagles	9	2	1	.818	7–1	376	156	W1
Washington Redskins	7	5	0	.583	5–3	291	287	W1
New York Giants	4	8	0	.333	3–5	297	388	L2
Pittsburgh Steelers	4	8	0	.333	3–5	200	243	L1
Boston Yanks	3	9	0	.250	2–6	174	372	W1

Note: Tie games were not officially counted in the standings until 1972.

NFL Western Division
	W	L	T	PCT	DIV	PF	PA	STK
Chicago Cardinals	11	1	0	.917	7–1	395	226	W10
Chicago Bears	10	2	0	.833	7–1	375	151	L1
Los Angeles Rams	6	5	1	.545	3–5	327	269	W3
Green Bay Packers	3	9	0	.250	2–6	154	290	L7
Detroit Lions	2	10	0	.167	1–7	200	407	L3

== NFL Championship Game ==
Philadelphia Eagles 7, Chicago Cardinals 0 in a blizzard at Shibe Park, Philadelphia, Pennsylvania, December 19, 1948

== League leaders ==
Statistic	Name	Team	Yards
Passing	Sammy Baugh	Washington	2599
Rushing	Steve Van Buren	Philadelphia	945
Receiving	Mal Kutner	Chicago Cardinals	943

== Awards ==
- UPI NFL Most Valuable Player – Pat Harder, Chicago Cardinals

== Coaching changes ==
- Detroit Lions: Gus Dorais was replaced by Bo McMillin.
- Los Angeles Rams: Bob Snyder was replaced by Clark Shaughnessy.
- Pittsburgh Steelers: Jock Sutherland was replaced by John Michelosen.
