= 1949 New York Bulldogs season =

National Football League team season

- Owner: Ted Collins
- Head coach: Charley Ewart
- Home stadium: Polo Grounds

Results
- Record: 1–10–1
- Division place: 5th NFL Eastern
- Playoffs: Did not qualify

The 1949 New York Bulldogs season was their first season in New York in the National Football League (NFL), and the continuation of the Dayton Triangles franchise, after having played five years as the Boston Yanks, and last as the Bulldogs (subsequently becoming the New York Yanks). They finished 1–10–1, last place in the Eastern Division and the worst record in the ten-team league.

The head coach was Charley Ewart, previously the general manager (and backfield coach) for the Philadelphia Eagles who played college football at Yale. Signed to a three-year contract, he resigned the day after the regular season's final game, a 27–0 home loss to Pittsburgh with just over 4,000 in attendance.

== NFL draft ==
Round	Pick	Player	Position	School
1	3	Doak Walker	Halfback	Southern Methodist

Halfback Doak Walker was selected as a "future pick" after his Heisman Trophy-winning junior season, but he stayed at SMU for his senior season in 1949. (He missed the 1946 season due to military service.) Walker's draft rights were traded to the Detroit Lions, where his hall of fame career began in 1950.

== Schedule ==
Week	Date	Opponent	Result	Record	Venue	Recap
1	September 22	**Philadelphia Eagles**	**L** 0–7	0–1	Polo Grounds	Recap
2	September 30	**New York Giants**	**L** 14–38	0–2	Polo Grounds	Recap
3	October 7	Green Bay Packers	**L** 0–19	0–3	Polo Grounds	Recap
4	October 16	at **Washington Redskins**	**L** 14–38	0–4	Griffith Stadium	Recap
5	October 23	at **Pittsburgh Steelers**	**L** 13–24	0–5	Forbes Field	Recap
6	October 30	**Washington Redskins**	**T** 14–14	0–5–1	Polo Grounds	Recap
7	November 6	at **New York Giants**	**W** 31–24	1–5–1	Polo Grounds	Recap
8	November 13	Chicago Cardinals	**L** 20–65	1–6–1	Polo Grounds	Recap
9	November 20	at **Philadelphia Eagles**	**L** 0–42	1–7–1	Shibe Park	Recap
10	November 27	at Los Angeles Rams	**L** 20–42	1–8–1	Los Angeles Memorial Coliseum	Recap
11	December 4	at Detroit Lions	**L** 27–28	1–9–1	Briggs Stadium	Recap
12	December 11	**Pittsburgh Steelers**	**L** 0–27	1–10–1	Polo Grounds	Recap
Note: Intra-conference opponents are in **bold** text.

== Standings ==
NFL Eastern Division
	W	L	T	PCT	DIV	PF	PA	STK
Philadelphia Eagles	11	1	0	.917	8–0	364	134	W8
Pittsburgh Steelers	6	5	1	.545	4–4	224	214	W1
New York Giants	6	6	0	.500	3–5	287	298	L2
Washington Redskins	4	7	1	.364	3–4–1	268	339	L1
New York Bulldogs	1	10	1	.091	1–6–1	153	368	L5

Note: Tie games were not officially counted in the standings until 1972.

== Roster ==
1949 New York Bulldogs roster
Quarterbacks: 22 Bobby Layne P; Running backs: 10 Joe Golding CB; 23 Frank Muehlheuser LB; 80 Joe Osmanski; 15 Paul Shoults CB; Receivers: 38 Bill Chipley; 83 Ralph Heywood P/DE; 46 Hal Prescott DE	Linemen/Linebackers: 39 Joe Abbey DE/WR; 36 Fritz Barzilauskas G/MG; 84 Stan Batinski MG; 64 Tom Blake DT; 34 Joe Domnanovich C/MLB; 55 Herb Ellis C/LB; 20 Frank Gaul DT; 44 John Nolan T/DT; 26 Larry Olsonoski OLB; 61 Merv Pregulman OLB; 21 Joe Sabasteanski G; 27 Nick Scollard DE/WR/K; 8 Sam Tamburo DE; 51 Carroll Vogelaar T/DT; 70 John Weaver G	Defensive backs: 4 Jim Canady CB/RB; 56 Frank Nelson S/RB; 18 John Rauch S/QB; 11 Ed Smith CB/RB; 12 Jim Wade CB/RB; Special teams: 32 Mike Boyda P/OLB	Reserve list: 86 Phil Slosburg RB/CB (Susp.); 4 Joe Watt CB (IR); rookies in italics
