= 1949 Pittsburgh Steelers season =

NFL team season

- Head coach: John Michelosen
- Home stadium: Forbes Field

Results
- Record: 6–5–1
- Division place: 2nd NFL Eastern
- Playoffs: Did not qualify

The 1949 Pittsburgh Steelers season was the franchise's 17th in the National Football League, and the second season with John Michelosen as head coach. The team finished the season with a record of 6–5-1, improving slightly from the previous season record of 4–8, but again failing to qualify for the playoffs.

== Regular season ==
=== Schedule ===
Week	Date	Opponent	Result	Record	Venue	Recap
1	September 25	**New York Giants**	**W** 28–7	1–0	Forbes Field	Recap
2	October 3	**Washington Redskins**	**L** 14–27	1–1	Forbes Field	Recap
3	October 8	Detroit Lions	**W** 14–7	2–1	Forbes Field	Recap
4	October 16	at **New York Giants**	**W** 21–17	3–1	Polo Grounds	Recap
5	October 23	**New York Bulldogs**	**W** 24–13	4–1	Forbes Field	Recap
6	October 30	**Philadelphia Eagles**	**L** 7–38	4–2	Forbes Field	Recap
7	November 6	at **Washington Redskins**	**L** 14–27	4–3	Griffith Stadium	Recap
8	November 13	Los Angeles Rams	**T** 7–7	4–3–1	Forbes Field	Recap
9	November 20	at Green Bay Packers	**W** 30–7	5–3–1	Wisconsin State Fair Park	Recap
10	November 27	at **Philadelphia Eagles**	**L** 17–34	5–4–1	Shibe Park	Recap
11	December 4	at Chicago Bears	**L** 21–30	5–5–1	Wrigley Field	Recap
12	December 11	at **New York Bulldogs**	**W** 27–0	6–5–1	Polo Grounds	Recap
Note: Intra-division opponents are in **bold** text.

=== Game summaries ===
==== Week 1 (Sunday September 25, 1949): New York Giants ====
	1	2	3	4	Total
Giants	0	0	0	7	**7**
**Steelers**	0	21	0	7	**28**

at Forbes Field, Pittsburgh, Pennsylvania

- Game time:
- Game weather:
- Game attendance: 20,957
- Referee:
- TV announcers:

Scoring drives:

- Pittsburgh – Nickel 52 pass from Gage (Glamp kick)
- Pittsburgh – Nuzum 9 run (Glamp kick)
- Pittsburgh – Samuel 31 run (Glamp kick)
- Pittsburgh – Geri 2 run (Glamp kick)
- New York Giants – Poole 13 pass from Conerly (Agajanian kick)

==== Week 2 (Monday October 3, 1949): Washington Redskins ====
	1	2	3	4	Total
**Redskins**	6	0	14	7	**27**
Steelers	0	14	0	0	**14**

at Forbes Field, Pittsburgh, Pennsylvania

- Game time:
- Game weather:
- Game attendance: 30,000
- Referee:
- TV announcers:

Scoring drives:

- Washington – Taylor 24 pass from Baugh (kick failed)
- Pittsburgh – Shipkey 2 run (Glamp kick)
- Pittsburgh – Nuzum 27 run (Glamp kick)
- Washington – Sandifer 35 pass from Baugh (Poillon kick)
- Washington – Taylor 58 pass from Baugh (Poillon kick)
- Washington – Goode 1 run (Poillon kick)

==== Week 3 (Saturday October 8, 1949): Washington Redskins ====
	1	2	3	4	Total
Lions	0	0	0	7	**7**
**Steelers**	0	7	7	0	**14**

at Forbes Field, Pittsburgh, Pennsylvania

- Game time:
- Game weather:
- Game attendance: 21,355
- Referee:
- TV announcers:

Scoring drives:

- Pittsburgh – Shipkey 1 run (Glamp kick)
- Pittsburgh – Shipkey 2 run (Glamp kick)
- Detroit – Doll 95 interception (Dudley kick)

==== Week 4 (Sunday October 16, 1949): New York Giants ====
	1	2	3	4	Total
**Steelers**	7	0	7	7	**21**
Giants	0	17	0	0	**17**

at Polo Grounds, New York, New York

- Game time:
- Game weather:
- Game attendance: 29,911
- Referee:
- TV announcers:

Scoring drives:

- Pittsburgh – Geri 3 run (Glamp kick)
- New York Giants – FG Agajanian 38
- New York Giants – Scott 4 run (Agajanian kick)
- New York Giants – Scott 2 run (Agajanian kick)
- Pittsburgh – Samuelson 26 fumble run (Glamp kick)
- Pittsburgh – Jansante 29 pass from Finks (Glamp kick)

==== Week 5 (Sunday October 23, 1949): New York Bulldogs ====
	1	2	3	4	Total
Bulldogs	10	3	0	0	**13**
**Steelers**	10	7	7	0	**24**

at Forbes Field, Pittsburgh, Pennsylvania

- Game time:
- Game weather:
- Game attendance: 22,042
- Referee:
- TV announcers:

Scoring drives:

- Pittsburgh – Nuzum 25 run (Glamp kick)
- New York Bulldogs – Layne 1 run (Scollard kick)
- Pittsburgh – FG Glamp 17
- Pittsburgh – Geri 3 run (Glamp kick)
- New York Bulldogs – FG Scollard 27
- New York Bulldogs – FG Scollard 25
- Pittsburgh – Nuzum 6 run (Glamp kick)

==== Week 6 (Sunday October 30, 1949): Philadelphia Eagles ====
	1	2	3	4	Total
**Eagles**	3	14	7	14	**38**
Steelers	0	0	7	0	**7**

at Forbes Field, Pittsburgh, Pennsylvania

- Game time:
- Game weather:
- Game attendance: 37,903
- Referee:
- TV announcers:

Scoring drives:

- Philadelphia – FG Patton 48
- Philadelphia – Van Buren 1 run (Muha kick)
- Philadelphia – Scott 70 punt return (Muha kick)
- Philadelphia – Van Buren 6 run (Muha kick)
- Pittsburgh – Jansante 35 pass from Finks (Glamp kick)
- Philadelphia – Thompson 1 run (Muha kick)
- Philadelphia – Pihos 15 pass from Mackrides (Muha kick)

==== Week 7 (Sunday November 6, 1949): Washington Redskins ====
	1	2	3	4	Total
Steelers	0	7	7	0	**14**
**Redskins**	0	7	0	20	**27**

at Griffith Stadium, Washington, DC

- Game time:
- Game weather:
- Game attendance:
- Referee:
- TV announcers:

Scoring drives:

- Washington – Taylor 51 pass from Gilmer (Poillon kick)
- Pittsburgh – Finks 5 run (Glamp kick)
- Pittsburgh – Shipkey 1 run (Glamp kick)
- Washington – Stout 74 run (Poillon kick)
- Washington – Stout 1 run (kick failed)
- Washington -Dowda 1 run (Poillon kick)

==== Week 8 (Sunday November 13, 1949): Los Angeles Rams ====
	1	2	3	4	Total
Rams	0	0	0	7	**7**
Steelers	0	7	0	0	**7**

at Forbes Field, Pittsburgh, Pennsylvania

- Game time:
- Game weather:
- Game attendance: 20,510
- Referee:
- TV announcers:

Scoring drives:

- Pittsburgh – Geri 18 run (Glamp kick)
- Los Angeles – Gehrke 1 run (Waterfield kick)

==== Week 9 (Sunday November 20, 1949): Green Bay Packers ====
	1	2	3	4	Total
**Steelers**	0	7	7	16	**30**
Packers	0	0	7	0	**7**

at City Stadium, Green Bay, Wisconsin

- Game time:
- Game weather:
- Game attendance:
- Referee:
- TV announcers:

Scoring drives:

- Pittsburgh – Jansante 47 pass from Geri (Geri kick)
- Pittsburgh – Nuzum 64 run (Geri kick)
- Green Bay – Girard 1 run (Fritsch kick)
- Pittsburgh – Safety, Girard's punt blocked out of end zone by Samuelson
- Pittsburgh – Nuzum 8 pass from Geri (Geri kick)
- Pittsburgh – Gage 3 run (Geri kick)

==== Week 10 (Sunday November 27, 1949): Philadelphia Eagles ====
	1	2	3	4	Total
Steelers	7	3	0	7	**17**
**Eagles**	10	7	7	10	**34**

at Shibe Park, Philadelphia, Pennsylvania

- Game time:
- Game weather:
- Game attendance: 22,191
- Referee:
- TV announcers:

Scoring drives:

- Philadelphia – Armstrong 13 pass from Thompson (Patton kick)
- Pittsburgh – Nuzum 67 pass from Geri (Geri kick)
- Philadelphia – FG Patton 16
- Pittsburgh – FG Geri 34
- Philadelphia – Ferrante 3 pass from Thompson (Patton kick)
- Philadelphia – Parmer 1 run (Patton kick)
- Philadelphia – FG Patton 13
- Pittsburgh – Nickel 40 pass from Gage (Geri kick)

==== Week 11 (Sunday December 4, 1949): Chicago Bears ====
	1	2	3	4	Total
Steelers	0	7	0	14	**21**
**Bears**	7	10	6	7	**30**

at Wrigley Field, Chicago, Illinois

- Game time:
- Game weather:
- Game attendance: 36,071
- Referee:
- TV announcers:

Scoring drives:

- Chicago Bears – Rykovick 20 pass from Lujack (Lujack kick)
- Pittsburgh – Nickel 48 pass from Geri (Geri kick)
- Chicago Bears – Hoffman 3 run (Lujack kick)
- Chicago Bears – FG Blanda 33
- Chicago Bears – Rykovich 1 run (kick failed)
- Chicago Bears – Rykovich 1 run (Lujack kick)
- Pittsburgh – Gage 97 run (Geri kick)
- Pittsburgh – Gage 6 run (Geri kick)

==== Week 12 (Sunday December 11, 1949): New York Bulldogs ====
	1	2	3	4	Total
**Steelers**	0	6	14	7	**27**
Bulldogs	0	0	0	0	**0**

at Polo Grounds, New York, New York

- Game time:
- Game weather:
- Game attendance: 4,028
- Referee:
- TV announcers:

Scoring drives:

- Pittsburgh – Shipkey 1 run (kick failed)
- Pittsburgh – Jansante 44 pass from Geri (Geri kick)
- Pittsburgh – Geri 1 run (Geri kick)
- Pittsburgh – Finks 17 pass from Seabright (Geri kick)

== Standings ==
NFL Eastern Division
	W	L	T	PCT	DIV	PF	PA	STK
Philadelphia Eagles	11	1	0	.917	8–0	364	134	W8
Pittsburgh Steelers	6	5	1	.545	4–4	224	214	W1
New York Giants	6	6	0	.500	3–5	287	298	L2
Washington Redskins	4	7	1	.364	3–4–1	268	339	L1
New York Bulldogs	1	10	1	.091	1–6–1	153	368	L5

Note: Tie games were not officially counted in the standings until 1972.

== Roster ==
1949 Pittsburgh Steelers final roster
Backs: 44 Jim Finks RB/CB; 77 Bobby Gage RB/CB; 35 Joe Geri RB/CB/K; 45 Bob Hanlon CB/RB; 11 Howard Hartley S/RB; 42 Joe Hollingsworth FB/OLB; 25 Frank Minini RB/CB/S; 22 Jerry Nuzum RB/CB; 27 George Papach FB/LB; 66 Don Samuel RB/CB; 33 Charley Seabright FB; Receivers: 54 Val Jansante; 80 Bob Long; 81 Elbie Nickel	Linemen/Linebackers: 56 Bob Balog OLB/C; 89 Pete Barbolak T/DT; 28 Bob Davis DE; 73 Darrell Hogan MLB; 37 Bill McPeak DE; 55 Charley Mehelich DE; 72 Red Moore G/MG; 40 Leo Nobile MLB/G; 86 Carl Samuelson DT/T; 49 Jerry Shipkey OLB/FB; 57 Frank Sinkovitz OLB; 62 Steve Suhey G; 65 Walt Szot DT; 46 Bill Walsh C; 75 Jack Wiley T; 79 Frank Wydo T/DT; Rookies in italics
