= List of Washington Commanders head coaches =

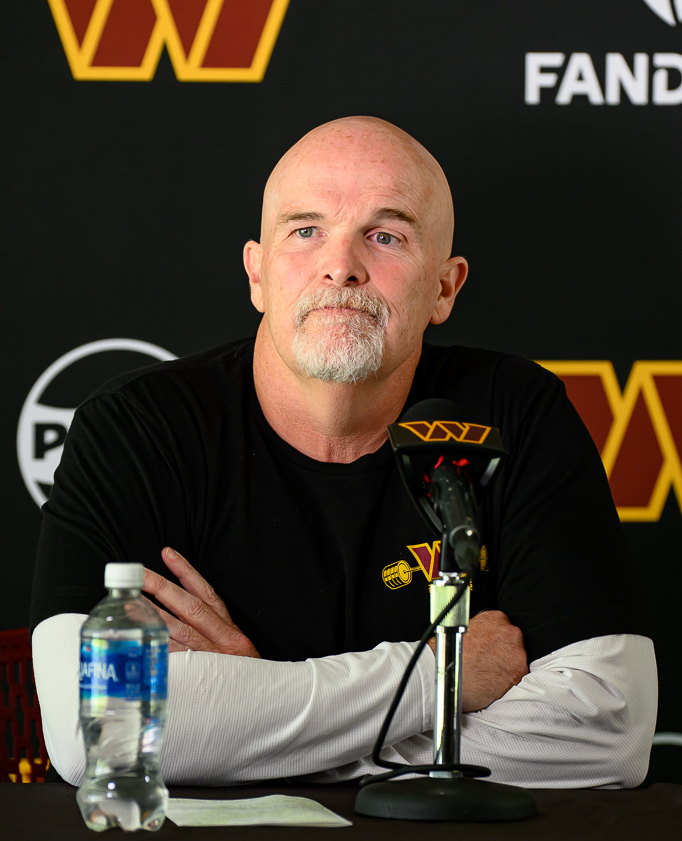
Dan Quinn, Washington's current head coach, was hired in 2024.

The Washington Commanders are a professional American football franchise based in the Washington metropolitan area. They are members of the East division in the National Football Conference (NFC) of the National Football League (NFL). The Commanders were founded in 1932 as the Boston Braves, named after the local baseball franchise. The franchise changed its name the following year to the Redskins and moved to Washington, D.C. in 1937. In 2020, the team retired the Redskins name after longstanding controversies surrounding it and briefly played as the Washington Football Team before becoming the Commanders in 2022.

There have been 31 head coaches for the franchise, four of which played for the franchise during their career. Joe Gibbs is the only coach to have more than one tenure with the team. Ray Flaherty coached teams that won the 1937 and 1942 NFL Championships, while Joe Gibbs coached teams that won Super Bowl XVII (1982), Super Bowl XXII (1987), and Super Bowl XXVI (1991). Gibbs is the franchise leader in games coached and wins, with Dudley DeGroot leading in winning percentage with .737. Seven are Pro Football Hall of Fame members: Flaherty, Turk Edwards, Curly Lambeau, Otto Graham, Vince Lombardi, George Allen, and Gibbs.

== Coaches ==
#	Number of coaches (Note: A running total of the number of coaches of the Redskins. Thus any coach who has two terms as head coach is only counted once.)
GC	Games coached
W	Wins
L	Loses
T	Ties
Win %	Winning percentage
†	Elected into the Pro Football Hall of Fame as a coach
‡	Elected into the Pro Football Hall of Fame as a player
*	Spent their entire NFL head coaching career with Washington

List of Boston Braves / Boston Redskins / Washington Redskins / Washington Football Team / Washington Commanders head coaches
#	Image	Coach	Term	Regular season					Playoffs			Awards	Ref.
#	Image	Coach	Term	GC	W	L	T	Win%	GC	W	L	Awards	Ref.
1		Lud Wray	1932	10	4	4	2	.500	—	—	—	—	
2		Lone Star Dietz* (Note: George Preston Marshall, owner and founder of the franchise, sought to rename the Boston Braves after leaving the stadium they shared with the baseball team of the same name. He chose the name Redskins in honor of Dietz, who was Sioux.)	1933–1934*	24	11	11	2	.500	—	—	—	—	
3		Eddie Casey*	1935*	11	2	8	1	.200	—	—	—	—	
4		Ray Flaherty †	1936–1942	78	54	21	3	.720	4	2	2	—	
5		Dutch Bergman*	1943*	10	6	3	1	.667	2	1	1	—	
6		Dudley DeGroot* (Note: DeGroot was a member of the United States rugby team that won an Olympic gold medal during the 1924 competition in Paris.)	1944–1945*	20	14	5	1	.737	1	0	1	—	
7		Turk Edwards* ‡	1946–1948*	35	16	18	1	.471	—	—	—	—	
8		John Whelchel* (Note: Fired after seven games)	1949*	7	3	3	1	.500	—	—	—	—	
9		Herman Ball* (Note: Fired after three games in the 1951 season.)	1949–1951*	20	4	16	0	.200	—	—	—	—	
10		Dick Todd*	1951*	9	5	4	0	.556	—	—	—	—	
11		Curly Lambeau †	1952–1953	24	10	13	1	.435	—	—	—	—	
12		Joe Kuharich	1954–1958	60	26	32	2	.448	—	—	—	Sporting News Coach of the Year (1955); UPI NFL Coach of the Year (1955)	
13		Mike Nixon	1959–1960	24	4	18	2	.182	—	—	—	—	
14		Bill McPeak*	1961–1965*	70	21	46	3	.313	—	—	—	—	
15		Otto Graham* ‡	1966–1968*	42	17	22	3	.436	—	—	—	—	
16		Vince Lombardi † (Note: Lombardi died from cancer during the 1970 preseason)	1969	14	7	5	2	.583	—	—	—	—	
17		Bill Austin	1970	14	6	8	0	.429	—	—	—	—	
18		George Allen †	1971–1977	98	67	30	1	.691	7	2	5	AP Coach of the Year (1971); Pro Football Weekly Coach of the Year (1971); Sporting News Coach of the Year (1971); UPI NFC Coach of the Year (1971)	
19		Jack Pardee	1978–1980	48	24	24	0	.500	—	—	—	AP Coach of the Year (1979); UPI NFC Coach of the Year (1979)	
20		Joe Gibbs* (Note: Gibbs full coaching record with the Redskins is 248 regular season games coached with a record of 154–94–0 and a W–L percentage of .621. He is also 17–7 in 24 Playoff games.)	1981–1992*	184	124	60	0	.674	21	16	5	AP Coach of the Year (1982, 1983); Pro Football Weekly Coach of the Year (1982, 1983); Sporting News Coach of the Year (1982, 1983, 1991); UPI NFC Coach of the Year (1982)	
21		Richie Petitbon*	1993*	16	4	12	0	.250	—	—	—	—	
22		Norv Turner	1994–2000	109	49	59	1	.454	2	1	1	—	
23		Terry Robiskie (Note: Took over for last 3 games of the season.)	2000	3	1	2	0	.333	—	—	—	—	
24		Marty Schottenheimer	2001	16	8	8	0	.500	—	—	—	—	
25		Steve Spurrier*	2002–2003*	32	12	20	0	.375	—	—	—	—	
—		Joe Gibbs*	2004–2007*	64	30	34	0	.469	3	1	2	—	
26		Jim Zorn*	2008–2009*	32	12	20	0	.375	—	—	—	—	
27		Mike Shanahan	2010–2013	64	24	40	0	.375	1	0	1	—	
28		Jay Gruden* (Note: Fired five games into the 2019 season, with Bill Callahan taking over for the rest of the year.)	2014–2019	85	35	49	1	.418	1	0	1	—	
29		Bill Callahan	2019	11	3	8	0	.273	—	—	—	—	
30		Ron Rivera	2020–2023	67	26	40	1	.396	1	0	1	George Halas Award (2022)	
31		Dan Quinn	2024–present	34	17	17	0	.500	3	2	1	—	
#	Image	Coach	Term	GC	W	L	T	Win%	GC	W	L	Awards	Ref.
#	Image	Coach	Term	Regular season					Playoffs			Awards	Ref.
