= Frank Ziegler =

American football player (1923–2011)

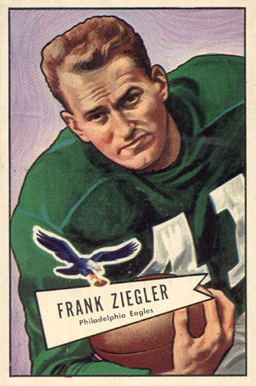
- Ziegler on a 1952 Bowman football card

No. 41
- Positions: Halfback, defensive back

Personal information
- Born: October 1, 1923; College Park, Georgia, U.S.
- Died: March 6, 2011 (aged 87); Gainesville, Georgia, U.S.
- Listed height: 5 ft 11 in (1.80 m)
- Listed weight: 175 lb (79 kg)

Career information
- High school: College Park
- College: Georgia Tech (1946–1948)
- NFL draft: 1949: 3rd round, 29th overall pick

Career history
- Philadelphia Eagles (1949–1953)

Awards and highlights
- NFL champion (1949); Second-team All-SEC (1948)

Career NFL statistics
- Rushing yards: 1,926
- Rushing average: 3.7
- Receptions: 47
- Receiving yards: 639
- Total touchdowns: 15
- Stats at Pro Football Reference

Francis Richard Ziegler (October 1, 1923 – March 6, 2011) was an American professional football running back in the National Football League (NFL) who played five seasons for the Philadelphia Eagles. Frank Ziegler started a tool company with his brother Bill after retiring from the NFL.

== NFL career statistics ==
Legend
	Won the NFL championship
**Bold**	Career high

Year	Team	Games		Rushing					Receiving				
Year	Team	GP	GS	Att	Yds	Avg	Lng	TD	Rec	Yds	Avg	Lng	TD
1949	PHI	10	4	84	283	3.4	41	1	3	33	11.0	24	0
1950	PHI	12	12	**172**	**733**	**4.3**	**52**	1	13	**216**	**16.6**	**48**	**2**
1951	PHI	12	6	113	418	3.7	34	2	8	59	7.4	19	0
1952	PHI	11	8	67	172	2.6	12	2	8	120	15.0	37	**2**
1953	PHI	12	11	83	320	3.9	**52**	**5**	**15**	211	14.1	43	0
Career		57	41	519	1,926	3.7	52	11	47	639	13.6	48	4
