= Bobby Gage =

American football player (1927–2005)

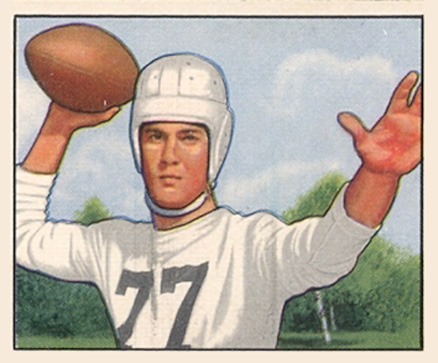
- Gage on a 1950 Bowman football card

No. 77
- Positions: Halfback, quarterback, defensive back

Personal information
- Born: January 15, 1927; Chester, South Carolina, U.S.
- Died: April 19, 2005 (aged 78); Greenville, South Carolina, U.S.
- Listed height: 5 ft 11 in (1.80 m)
- Listed weight: 175 lb (79 kg)

Career information
- High school: Boys High School (Anderson, South Carolina)
- College: Clemson
- NFL draft: 1949: 1st round, 6th overall pick

Career history
- Pittsburgh Steelers (1949–1950)

Awards and highlights
- First-team All-American (1948); First-team All-SoCon (1948); 1949 Gator Bowl MVP; Clemson Hall of Fame (1976); South Carolina Hall of Fame (1978); Gator Bowl Hall of Fame (1990); Longest run from scrimmage in Pittsburgh Steelers history (97 yards)

Career NFL statistics
- Rushing yards: 334
- Rushing average: 3.9
- Receptions: 7
- Receiving yards: 135
- Passing yards: 623
- TD–INT: 3-9
- Passer rating: 34.4
- Defensive interceptions: 9
- Stats at Pro Football Reference

Robert Gage II (January 15, 1927 – April 19, 2005) was an American professional football player who played two seasons in the National Football League (NFL) with the Pittsburgh Steelers.

== Early life ==
Gage was born in Chester, South Carolina. He attended Boys High School in Anderson, South Carolina.

He matriculated at Clemson University.

== Professional career ==
Gage was selected in the first round with the sixth overall pick by the Pittsburgh Steelers in the 1949 NFL draft. He was also selected by the Baltimore Colts of the All-America Football Conference.

He played two seasons for the Steelers at tailback, quarterback and defensive back. In the penultimate game of the 1949 season, Gage set a franchise record which still stands with a 97-yard run on a fake punt. This run also tied the league record at the time which was held by the Green Bay Packers' Andy Uram. The record stood until 1982, when Tony Dorsett scored from 99 yards out.

Gage retired from football after two seasons to devote more time to his family and his off-season job as an executive at a South Carolina textile firm.

== Personal life ==
Gage married Patricia "Patsy" McGarahan in 1947. The couple had six children, four girls and two boys.

After finishing his football career, Gage had a forty-year career at Chemurgy Products in Greenville, South Carolina.

Gage died of an apparent heart attack at his home in Greenville on April 19, 2005.
