= Eddie Saenz =

American football player (1923–1971)

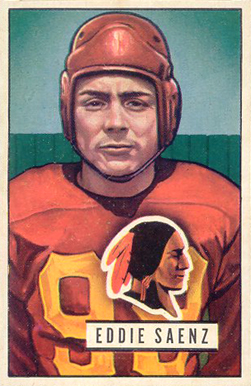
- Saenz on a 1951 Bowman football card

No. 99
- Positions: Halfback, defensive back, return specialist

Personal information
- Born: September 21, 1923; Santa Monica, California, U.S.
- Died: April 28, 1971 (aged 47); Santa Monica, California, U.S.
- Listed height: 5 ft 11 in (1.80 m)
- Listed weight: 169 lb (77 kg)

Career information
- High school: Venice (Los Angeles, California)
- College: Loyola Marymount (1941-1942); USC (1943)
- NFL draft: 1945: 15th round, 150th overall pick

Career history
- Washington Redskins (1946–1951)

Career NFL statistics
- Rushing yards: 619
- Rushing average: 3.3
- Receptions: 84
- Receiving yards: 1,327
- Return yards: 2,834
- Total touchdowns: 12
- Stats at Pro Football Reference

Edwin Matthew Saenz (September 21, 1923 – April 28, 1971) was an American professional football running back for the Washington Redskins of the National Football League (NFL). He played college football at the University of Southern California and was selected in the 15th round of the 1945 NFL draft. Saenz was given the nickname "tortilla" because of his Mexican American heritage.

Eddie was a causal factor in USC's winning the 1944 Rose Bowl. He enlisted in the Navy prior to the end of World War II and played football with the Great Lakes Naval Academy. A career-ending injury forced Eddie to retire after five years with the Washington Redskins where he played both offense as a halfback and defense. After his retirement from football, he worked as a stunt man for various movies and often served as a double for Anthony Quinn. Eddie died at age 48 leaving a widow and nine children.

== NFL career statistics ==
Legend
	Led the league
**Bold**	Career high

Year	Team	Games		Rushing					Receiving					Punt returns					Kick returns				
Year	Team	GP	GS	Att	Yds	Avg	Lng	TD	Rec	Yds	Avg	Lng	TD	Ret	Yds	Avg	Lng	TD	Ret	Yds	Avg	Lng	TD
1946	WAS	10	3	**55**	**213**	**3.9**	12	**1**	12	242	**20.2**	66	3	0	0	0.0	0	0	11	264	24.0	55	0
1947	WAS	12	6	51	143	2.8	**18**	0	**34**	**598**	17.6	**74**	**4**	**24**	**308**	12.8	30	0	**29**	**797**	27.5	**94**	**2**
1948	WAS	4	2	8	21	2.6	5	0	4	62	15.5	28	0	2	26	**13.0**	16	0	8	173	21.6	27	0
1949	WAS	12	4	53	170	3.2	14	0	23	251	10.9	31	0	17	178	10.5	**32**	0	24	465	19.4	34	0
1950	WAS	10	6	20	64	3.2	13	**1**	10	165	16.5	36	1	14	125	8.9	24	0	12	347	**28.9**	71	0
1951	WAS	2	0	3	8	2.7	6	0	1	9	9.0	9	0	2	6	3.0	6	0	9	145	16.1	24	0
		50	21	190	619	3.3	18	2	84	1,327	15.8	74	8	59	643	10.9	32	0	93	2,191	23.6	94	2
