= 1949 Philadelphia Eagles season =

NFL team season

- Owner: Happy Hundred
- Head coach: Greasy Neale
- Home stadium: Shibe Park

Results
- Record: 11–1
- Division place: 1st NFL Eastern
- Playoffs: Won NFL Championship (at Rams) 14–0

The 1949 Philadelphia Eagles season was the franchise's 17th season in the National Football League. The Eagles won their second-consecutive NFL championship.

== Off season ==
The Eagles hold training camp for the first time at UM North Central Agriculture school in Grand Rapids, Minnesota.

=== NFL draft ===
The 1949 NFL draft was held on December 21, 1948. It was 25 rounds long. The Eagles had the Lottery Bonus Pick in the draft and picked 1st. The Eagles chose 26 players total during this draft. They had the last pick in each round as all teams picked in every round. The All-America Football Conference, a rival league signed some of the NFL cast offs and draft picks. With the bonus and 1st pick overall, the Eagles took a local hero from the University of Pennsylvania, a center and linebacker, Chuck Bednarik. Along with him, the other future NFL Hall of Famers picked this year were Norm Van Brocklin, George Blanda, and Doak Walker.

=== Player selections ===
The table shows the Eagles selections and what picks they had that were traded away and the team that ended up with that pick. It is possible the Eagles' pick ended up with this team via another team that the Eagles made a trade with. Not shown are acquired picks that the Eagles traded away.

1949 Philadelphia Eagles draft
| Round | Pick | Player | Position | College | Notes |
| 1 | 1 | Chuck Bednarik * ^{†} | C | Pennsylvania | Lottery bonus pick |
| 1 | 9 | Frank Tripucka | QB | Notre Dame | |
| 2 | 19 | Frank Burns | B | Rutgers | |
| 3 | 29 | Frank Ziegler * | B | Georgia Tech | |
| 4 | 41 | Don Panciera | B | San Francisco | Played with New York Yankees (AAFC) |
| 5 | 51 | Terry Brennan | B | Notre Dame | |
| 6 | 58 | Warren Huey | E | Michigan State | |
| 7 | 71 | Frank Gillespie | G | Clemson | |
| 8 | 81 | Bob Dean | B | Cornell | |
| 9 | 91 | Jonathan Jenkins | T | Dartmouth | Played with Baltimore Colts (AAFC) |
| 10 | 101 | Roy Lester | E | West Virginia | Returned to West Virginia |
| 11 | 111 | Bobby Wilson | B | Ole Miss | |
| 12 | 121 | Dale Armstrong | E | Dartmouth | |
| 13 | 131 | Lyle Button | T | Illinois | |
| 14 | 141 | Bobby Lund | B | Tennessee | |
| 15 | 151 | Carl Copp | T | Vanderbilt | |
| 16 | 161 | Frank Reno | E | West Virginia | |
| 17 | 171 | Leo Skladany | E | Pittsburgh | |
| 18 | 181 | Russ Strait | B | Muhlenberg | |
| 19 | 191 | Paul Odom | G | Rollins | |
| 20 | 201 | Lloyd Brinkman | B | Missouri | |
| 21 | 211 | Lou Futrell | B | USC | |
| 22 | 221 | Harvey Kingry | B | Colorado Mines | |
| 23 | 231 | Hank Kalver | T | Oklahoma City | |
| 24 | 241 | Fred Leon | T | Nevada | |
| 25 | 251 | John Schweder | G | Pennsylvania | |
Made roster † Pro Football Hall of Fame * Made at least one Pro Bowl during career

== Regular season ==
=== Schedule ===
| Week | Date | Opponent | Result | Record | Venue | Attendance | Recap |
|---|---|---|---|---|---|---|---|
| 1 | September 22 | at **New York Bulldogs** | **W** 7–0 | 1–0 | Polo Grounds | 4,355 | Recap |
| 2 | October 3 | at Detroit Lions | **W** 22–14 | 2–0 | Briggs Stadium | 20,163 | Recap |
| 3 | October 8 | Chicago Cardinals | **W** 28–3 | 3–0 | Shibe Park | 33,716 | Recap |
| 4 | October 16 | at Chicago Bears | **L** 21–38 | 3–1 | Wrigley Field | 47,248 | Recap |
| 5 | October 23 | **Washington Redskins** | **W** 49–14 | 4–1 | Shibe Park | 28,602 | Recap |
| 6 | October 30 | at **Pittsburgh Steelers** | **W** 38–7 | 5–1 | Forbes Field | 37,840 | Recap |
| 7 | November 6 | Los Angeles Rams | **W** 38–14 | 6–1 | Shibe Park | 38,230 | Recap |
| 8 | November 13 | at **Washington Redskins** | **W** 44–21 | 7–1 | Griffith Stadium | 31,170 | Recap |
| 9 | November 20 | **New York Bulldogs** | **W** 42–0 | 8–1 | Shibe Park | 22,165 | Recap |
| 10 | November 27 | **Pittsburgh Steelers** | **W** 34–17 | 9–1 | Shibe Park | 22,191 | Recap |
| 11 | December 4 | at **New York Giants** | **W** 24–3 | 10–1 | Polo Grounds | 25,446 | Recap |
| 12 | December 11 | **New York Giants** | **W** 17–3 | 11–1 | Shibe Park | 21,022 | Recap |

Note: Intra-division opponents are in bold text.

== Game recaps ==
=== Week 4 at Chi Bears ===
The Eagles get the only loss of the season against the Chicago Bears in a game played at Wrigley Field in Chicago. The last points of the game were made by 22 years 29 days old George Blanda. Blanda would score his last points against Philadelphia in his career 22 years and 1 day later on October 17, 1971. Also a placekicker, Blanda had one of the longest pro football careers, a total of 26 years.

Week 4: Philadelphia Eagles (3–1) at Chicago Bears (3–1)

| Quarter | 1 | 2 | 3 | 4 | Total |
|---|---|---|---|---|---|
| Eagles | 7 | 7 | 7 | 0 | 21 |
| Bears | 7 | 14 | 7 | 10 | 38 |

at Wrigley Field on Grass,

- Date: October 16, 1949
- Game time: 1:00 p.m. EST
- Game weather: degrees, wind mph

Game information

1st quarter

- Bears – George Gulyanics 1 yard rush (Johnny Lujack kick), Bears 7 – 0
- Eagles – Pete Pihos 16 yard pass from Tommy Thompson (Cliff Patton kick)Tied 7 – 7

2nd quarter

- Eagles – Steve Van Buren 50 yard pass from Tommy Thompson (Cliff Patton kick) Eagles 14 – 7
- Bears – Ken Kavanaugh 32 yard pass from Johnny Lujack (Johnny Lujack kick) Tied 14 – 14
- Bears – Johnny Lujack 1 yard rush (Johnny Lujack kick) Bears 21 – 14

3rd quarter

- Bears – Jim Keane 15 yard pass from Johnny Lujack (Johnny Lujack kick) Bears 28 – 14
- Eagles – Jack Ferrante 64 yard pass from Tommy Thompson (Cliff Patton kick) Bears 28 – 21

4th quarter

- Bears – George McAfee 54 yard interception return (Johnny Lujack kick) Bears 35 – 21
- Bears – George Blanda 20 yard field goal, Bears 38 – 21

Team Stats

- First downs – Phila 14 – Chi 28
- Rush-yards-TDs – Phila 32–42–0 – Chi 45–200–2
- Comp-Att-Yd-TD-INT – Phila 16–29–213–3–2 – Chi 16–26–257–2–1
- Sacked-yards – Phila 0–0 – Chi 0–0
- Net pass yards – Phila 213 – Chi 257
- Total yards – Phila 255 – Chi 457
- Fumbles-lost – Phila 0–0 – Chi 0–0
- Turnovers – Phila 2 – Chi 1
- Penalties-yards – Phila 4–38 – Chi 9–99

Eastern Division Standing

- Philadelphia Eagles(3–1–0)
- Pittsburgh Steelers (3–1–0)
- New York Giants (2–2–0)
- Washington Redskins (2–2–0)
- New York Bulldogs (0–4–0)

== NFL Championship Game ==
| Round | Date | Opponent | Result | Venue | Attendance | Recap |
|---|---|---|---|---|---|---|
| Championship | December 18 | at Los Angeles Rams | W 14–0 | Los Angeles Memorial Coliseum | 22,245 | Recap |

1949 NFL Championship: Philadelphia Eagles (11–1) at Los Angeles Rams (8–2–2)

| Quarter | 1 | 2 | 3 | 4 | Total |
|---|---|---|---|---|---|
| Eagles | 0 | 7 | 7 | 0 | 14 |
| Rams | 0 | 0 | 0 | 0 | 0 |

at Los Angeles Memorial Coliseum on natural grass

- Date: December 18, 1949
- Game time: 1:30 p.m. PST
- Game weather: Heavy rain
- Game attendance: 27,980

Game information

1st quarter

- No Scoring

2nd quarter

- Eagles – Pete Pihos 31 yard pass from Tommy Thompson (Cliff Patton kick), Eagles 7 – 0

3rd quarter

- Eagles – Leo Skladany 2 yard blocked punt return (Cliff Patton kick), Eagles 14 – 0

4th quarter

- No Scoring

Team Stats

- First downs – Phila 1 – LA 7
- Rush-yards-TDs – Phila 61–274–0 – LA 24–21–0
- Comp-Att-Yd-TD-INT – Phila 5–9–68–1–2 – Chi 10–27–98–0–1
- Sacked-yards – Phila 0–0 – LA 1–10
- Net pass yards – Phila 68 – LA 88
- Total yards – Phila 342 – LA 109
- Fumbles-lost – Phila 4–1 – LA 1–0
- Turnovers – Phila 3 – LA 1
- Penalties-yards – Phila 6–40 – LA 4–25

== Standings ==
NFL Eastern Division
| | W | L | T | PCT | DIV | PF | PA | STK |
|---|---|---|---|---|---|---|---|---|
| Philadelphia Eagles | 11 | 1 | 0 | .917 | 8–0 | 364 | 134 | W8 |
| Pittsburgh Steelers | 6 | 5 | 1 | .545 | 4–4 | 224 | 214 | W1 |
| New York Giants | 6 | 6 | 0 | .500 | 3–5 | 287 | 298 | L2 |
| Washington Redskins | 4 | 7 | 1 | .364 | 3–4–1 | 268 | 339 | L1 |
| New York Bulldogs | 1 | 10 | 1 | .091 | 1–6–1 | 153 | 368 | L5 |

Note: Tie games were not officially counted in the standings until 1972.

== Roster ==
(All time List of Philadelphia Eagles players in franchise history)

| = 1949 Pro Bowl | = Hall of Famer |

| NO. | Player | AGE | POS | GP | GS | WT | HT | YRS | College |
|---|---|---|---|---|---|---|---|---|---|
| | Greasy Neale | 58 | Coach | _{1949 record} 11–1 | _{Lifetime} 57–37–5 | | | 9th | West Virginia Wesleyan |
| | Neill Armstrong | 23 | E-DB | 12 | 4 | 189 | 6–2 | 2 | Oklahoma State |
| | Walt Barnes | 31 | G | 12 | 0 | 238 | 6–1 | 1 | LSU |
| 60 | Chuck Bednarik | 24 | LB-C | 10 | 7 | 233 | 6–3 | Rookie | Pennsylvania |
| | Russ Craft | 30 | DB-HB | 10 | 2 | 178 | 5–9 | 3 | Alabama |
| | Otis Douglas | 38 | T | 2 | 0 | 224 | 6–1 | 3 | William & Mary |
| | Jack Ferrante | 33 | E-DE | 12 | 7 | 197 | 6–1 | 8 | none |
| | Mario Giannelli | 29 | MG-G | 10 | 1 | 265 | 6–0 | 1 | Boston College |
| | John Green | 28 | DE-E | 7 | 2 | 192 | 6–1 | 2 | Tulsa |
| | Dick Humbert | 31 | E-DE | 11 | 0 | 179 | 6–1 | 8 | Richmond |
| | Mike Jarmoluk | 27 | DT-T-MG | 9 | 0 | 232 | 6–5 | 3 | Temple |
| | Bucko Kilroy | 28 | G-MG-T-DT | 12 | 12 | 243 | 6–2 | 6 | _{Notre Dame, Temple} |
| | Ben Kish | 32 | B | 7 | 0 | 207 | 6–0 | 9 | Pittsburgh |
| | Vic Lindskog | 35 | C | 5 | 4 | 203 | 6–1 | 5 | Stanford |
| | Jay MacDowell | 30 | T-DE | 8 | 1 | 217 | 6–2 | 3 | Washington |
| | Bill Mackrides | 24 | QB | 7 | 0 | 182 | 5–11 | 2 | Nevada-Reno |
| | John Magee | 26 | G | 12 | 3 | 220 | 5–10 | 1 | _{La-Lafayette, Rice} |
| | Duke Maronic | 28 | G | 11 | 2 | 209 | 5–9 | 5 | none |
| | Pat McHugh | 30 | DB-HB | 12 | 0 | 166 | 5–11 | 2 | Georgia Tech |
| | Joe Muha | 28 | FB-LB | 12 | 11 | 205 | 6–1 | 3 | VMI |
| | Jack Myers | 25 | FB-QB-LB | 12 | 3 | 200 | 6–2 | 1 | UCLA |
| | Jim Parmer | 23 | FB-HB | 12 | 1 | 193 | 6–0 | 1 | _{Oklahoma State, Texas A&M} |
| | Cliff Patton | 26 | G-LB | 12 | 7 | 243 | 6–2 | 3 | TCU |
| | Pete Pihos+ | 26 | E-DE | 11 | 9 | 210 | 6–1 | 2 | Indiana |
| | Hal Prescott | 29 | E | 3 | 0 | 199 | 6–1 | 3 | Hardin-Simmons |
| | Bosh Pritchard | 30 | HB | 8 | 7 | 164 | 5–11 | 7 | _{Georgia Tech, VMI} |
| | Frank Reagan | 30 | B | 12 | 0 | 182 | 5–11 | 8 | Pennsylvania |
| | George Savitsky | 25 | T | 12 | 0 | 244 | 6–2 | 1 | Pennsylvania |
| | Clyde Scott | 25 | HB-DB | 8 | 2 | 174 | 6–0 | Rookie | _{Arkansas, Navy} |
| | Vic Sears | 31 | T-DT | 11 | 11 | 223 | 6–3 | 8 | Oregon State |
| | Leo Skladany | 22 | E | 3 | 1 | 210 | 6–1 | Rookie | Pittsburgh |
| | Tommy Thompson | 33 | QB | 12 | 9 | 192 | 6–1 | 9 | Tulsa |
| 15 | Steve Van Buren+ | 29 | HB | 12 | 10 | 200 | 6–0 | 5 | LSU |
| | Al Wistert | 29 | T-G-DT | 12 | 11 | 214 | 6–1 | 6 | Michigan |
| | Alex Wojciechowicz | 34 | C-LB-E | 12 | 1 | 217 | 5–11 | 11 | Fordham |
| | Frank Ziegler | 26 | HB-DB | 10 | 4 | 175 | 5–11 | Rookie | Georgia Tech |
| | 35 Players; Team Average | 28.5 | | 12 | | 206.3 | 6–0.6 | 3.8 | |

== Postseason ==
The NFL and the AAFC agree to form one league as the NFL. The Philadelphia Eagles are scheduled to meet the AAFC 4 time Champion Cleveland Browns on the 1950 opening weekend in Philadelphia.

== Awards and honors ==
All-Star Selections

- Pete Pihos is selected as 1st team End – Defensive End.
- Steve Van Buren is selected as 1st team Halfback

League leaders

- Eagles Lead NFL as Overall Offensive Team.
- Eagles Lead NFL as Overall Defensive Team.
- Tommy Thompson finishes 2nd in Pass Completion Pct. with a .542 (214 attempts/116 completions)
- Tommy Thompson leads in Passer Rating with an 84.4 rating
- Steve Van Buren leads Rushing Attempts with 263
- Steve Van Buren leads Rushing Yardage with 1,146 at the time an NFL record for season.
- Bosh Pritchard leads in Rushing Yards per Attempts Avg. with 6.0 (84 rushes/506 yards 3 td, )
- Steve Van Buren leads Rushing Touchdowns with 11
- Cliff Patton leads league with Field Goals with 9 (on 18 attempts)
- Cliff Patton finishes 2nd in league on Field Goal Attempts with 18
- Frank Reagan and Clyde Scott are 2nd in Punt Returns for TDs with 1 each.
- Pat Mchugh and Joe Muha finishes 2nd in Interceptions Returned for TD with 1 each.
