= 1949 New York Giants season =

NFL team 25th season

- General manager: Ray Walsh
- Head coach: Steve Owen
- Home stadium: Polo Grounds

Results
- Record: 6–6
- Division place: 3rd NFL Eastern
- Playoffs: Did not qualify

The 1949 New York Giants season was the franchise's 25th season in the National Football League. The Giants finished in sole possession of 3rd place with a record of 6 wins and 6 losses.

== NFL draft ==
Round	Pick	Player	Position	School
1	4	Paul Page	Halfback	Southern Methodist
2	14	Al DeRogatis	Defensive Tackle	Duke
16	155	Jerry Morrical	Tackle	
17	166	Wally Teninga	Back	Michigan

== Regular season ==
=== Schedule ===
Game	Date	Opponent	Result	Record	Venue	Attendance	Recap	Sources
1	September 25	at **Pittsburgh Steelers**	**L** 7–28	0–1	Forbes Field	20,957	Recap	
2	September 30	at **New York Bulldogs**	**W** 38–14	1–1	Polo Grounds	17,704	Recap	
3	October 9	at **Washington Redskins**	**W** 45–35	2–1	Griffith Stadium	30,073	Recap	
4	October 16	**Pittsburgh Steelers**	**L** 17–21	2–2	Polo Grounds	29,911	Recap	
5	October 23	Chicago Bears	**W** 35–28	3–2	Polo Grounds	30,587	Recap	
6	October 30	at Chicago Cardinals	**W** 41–38	4–2	Comiskey Park	21,339	Recap	
7	November 6	**New York Bulldogs**	**L** 24–31	4–3	Polo Grounds	23,222	Recap	
8	November 13	at Green Bay Packers	**W** 30–10	5–3	City Stadium	20,151	Recap	
9	November 20	Detroit Lions	**L** 21–45	5–4	Polo Grounds	21,338	Recap	
10	November 27	**Washington Redskins**	**W** 23–7	6–4	Polo Grounds	12,985	Recap	
11	December 4	**Philadelphia Eagles**	**L** 3–24	6–5	Polo Grounds	25,446	Recap	
12	December 11	at **Philadelphia Eagles**	**L** 3–17	6–6	Shibe Park	21,022	Recap	
Note: Intra-division opponents are in **bold** text.

== Standings ==
NFL Eastern Division
	W	L	T	PCT	DIV	PF	PA	STK
Philadelphia Eagles	11	1	0	.917	8–0	364	134	W8
Pittsburgh Steelers	6	5	1	.545	4–4	224	214	W1
New York Giants	6	6	0	.500	3–5	287	298	L2
Washington Redskins	4	7	1	.364	3–4–1	268	339	L1
New York Bulldogs	1	10	1	.091	1–6–1	153	368	L5

Note: Tie games were not officially counted in the standings until 1972.

== Roster ==
1949 New York Giants final roster
Quarterbacks: 42 Charlie Conerly; 22 Ray Mallouf P/S; Running backs: 12 Ben Greenhalgh; 34 Bus Mertes; 35 Gene Roberts; 40 Jack Salscheider CB/P; 30 Joe Scott CB; 21 Joe Sulaitis; Receivers: 85 Dick Hensley DE; 82 Ray Poole DE; 81 Bill Swiacki	Linemen/Linebackers: 75 Bill Austin T; 76 Jon Baker OLB/G; 62 Carl Butkus G/MG; 52 John Cannady MLB; 63 Jake Colhouer G/MG; 79 Tex Coulter C; 78 Al DeRogatis DT/T; 87 Dick Duden DE/WR; 74 Don Ettinger OLB/G; 71 Ralph Hutchinson T/DT; 86 George Kershaw DE; 72 Ed Kolman T/DT; 89 Frank LoVuolo DE/WR; 61 Ed Royston G/MG; 70 John Sanchez T/DT; 77 Jim White DT/T	Defensive backs: 49 Ray Coates CB/RB; 37 Cletus Fischer CB/RB/S; 20 Noah Mullins CB/RB; 45 Emlen Tunnell S; Special teams: 41 Ben Agajanian K; Reserve list: 55 Carl Fennema C/LB (IR); rookies in italics

== See also ==
- List of New York Giants seasons
