= Don Samuel =

American football player (1924–2010)

- Samuel in 1949 with Steelers

No. 66, 88
- Positions: Defensive back, halfback

Personal information
- Born: February 16, 1924; Hood River, Oregon, U.S.
- Died: November 23, 2010 (aged 86); Portland, Oregon, U.S.
- Listed height: 5 ft 11 in (1.80 m)
- Listed weight: 190 lb (86 kg)

Career information
- High school: Hood River
- College: Oregon State (1946-1948)
- NFL draft: 1946: 3rd round, 25th overall pick

Career history
- Pittsburgh Steelers (1949–1950)

Awards and highlights
- 2× Second-team All-PCC (1946, 1948)

Career NFL statistics
- Rushing yards: 163
- Rushing average: 4.2
- Receptions: 1
- Receiving yards: 2
- Total touchdowns: 1
- Stats at Pro Football Reference

Donald Allen Samuel (February 16, 1924 – November 23, 2010) was an American professional football player who played at the defensive back and halfback positions.

== Early life ==
Samuel was born in Hood River, Oregon, in 1924. He graduated from Hood River High School in 1942 and enrolled at Oregon State College where he played college football for the Oregon State Beavers in the fall of 1942. His college education was interrupted by service in the Navy during World War II. While in the Navy, he played for the 1943 Iowa Pre-Flight Seahawks football team that compiled a 9–1 record (the sole looss by one point to national champion Notre Dame) and was ranked No. 2 in the final AP poll. He earned his pilots' wings five months after the war ended.

After the war, Samuel returned to Oregon State where he played for the 1946 and 1947, and 1948 Oregon State Beavers football teams. He was also captain of the 1948 team. He graduated from Oregon State in 1948 with a business degree.

== Professional football ==
Samuel was selected by the Los Angeles Rams in the third round (25th overall pick) of the 1946 NFL draft. He was traded by the Rams to the Pittsburgh Steelers in exchange for Tommy Kalmanir. He played for the Steelers during the 1949 and 1950 seasons and appeared in a total of six NFL games. He sustained torn knee ligaments and underwent surgery in October 1949. He attempted a comeback but appeared in only one game during the 1950 season.

== Family and later years ==
Samuel married Opal Boyle in 1948. He worked as an insurance agent for State Far for 32 year until his retirement in 1986. He died in 2010 at age 86 at the Encore Senior Village in Portland, Oregon.
