= Mike Boyda =

American football player (1921–1984)

No. 32
- Positions: Linebacker, Fullback, Punter

Personal information
- Born: November 21, 1921; Jenners, Pennsylvania, U.S.
- Died: July 16, 1984 (aged 62); Overland Park, Kansas, U.S.
- Listed height: 6 ft 1 in (1.85 m)
- Listed weight: 205 lb (93 kg)

Career information
- High school: Elders Ridge (Elders Ridge, Pennsylvania)
- College: Washington and Lee (1946–1948)
- NFL draft: 1949: 5th round, 44th overall pick

Career history
- New York Bulldogs (1949)

Career NFL statistics
- Games played: 9
- Punts: 56
- Punting yards: 2,475
- Punting average: 44.2
- Longest punt: 61
- Interceptions: 1
- Stats at Pro Football Reference

Michael Bartholomew Boyda (November 28, 1921 – July 16, 1984) was an American professional football player who was a linebacker, fullback and punter for the New York Bulldogs of the National Football League (NFL). He played college football for the Washington and Lee Generals.

== College career ==
Boyda played college football for the Washington and Lee Generals at quarterback from 1946 to 1948.

== Professional career ==
=== New York Bulldogs ===
Boyda was selected with the 44th pick in the fifth round of the 1949 NFL draft by the New York Bulldogs. He played in nine games, handling punting duties for the Bulldogs. Boyda punted 56 times for 2,475 yards with a longest punt of 61 yards and an average of 44.2. Due to the formula in place at the time, the NFL announced that he was the punting champion for the 1949 NFL season, despite having the fourth-highest punting average in the league. In a blowout loss to the Chicago Cardinals, Boyda made an interception off of Paul Christman.

=== New York Giants ===
Boyda was selected with the 371st overall pick in the 29th round of the 1950 NFL draft by the New York Giants, but never signed with the team.
