= Leo Skladany =

American football player (1927–2003)

No. 82, 87
- Position: Defensive end

Personal information
- Born: August 9, 1927; Larksville, Pennsylvania, U.S.
- Died: March 18, 2003 (aged 75); Pittsburgh, Pennsylvania, U.S.
- Listed height: 6 ft 2 in (1.88 m)
- Listed weight: 210 lb (95 kg)

Career information
- High school: Larksville
- College: Pittsburgh (1945–1948)
- NFL draft: 1949: 17th round, 171st overall pick

Career history
- Philadelphia Eagles (1949); New York Giants (1950)

Awards and highlights
- NFL champion (1949)

Career NFL statistics
- Games played: 7
- Stats at Pro Football Reference

Leo Bernard Skladany (August 9, 1927 – March 18, 2003) was an American professional football defensive end in the National Football League (NFL) for the Philadelphia Eagles and the New York Giants. He had a blocked punt return touchdown in the 1949 NFL Championship Game In his career, Skladany played in seven regular season games and two playoff games. He played college football at the University of Pittsburgh. His nephew was punter Tom Skladany and his brother was College football Hall of Famer Joe Skladany.
