= Joe Geri =

American football player (1924–2002)

No. 35, 37
- Positions: Quarterback, running back

Personal information
- Born: October 20, 1924; Phoenixville, Pennsylvania, U.S.
- Died: April 20, 2002 (aged 77); Milledgeville, Georgia, U.S.
- Listed height: 5 ft 10 in (1.78 m)
- Listed weight: 185 lb (84 kg)

Career information
- College: Georgia (1946–1948)
- NFL draft: 1949: 4th round, 36th overall pick

Career history
- Pittsburgh Steelers (1949–1951); Chicago Cardinals (1952)

Awards and highlights
- First-team All-Pro (1950); Second-team All-Pro (1951); 2× Pro Bowl (1950–1951); First-team All-SEC (1948)

Career NFL statistics
- Rushing yards: 1,550
- Rushing average: 3.6
- Receptions: 4
- Receiving yards: 92
- Passing yards: 1,926
- TD–INT: 13-27
- Passer rating: 36.7
- Stats at Pro Football Reference

Joe Geri (October 20, 1924 – April 20, 2002) was an American professional football player who was a quarterback and running back for four seasons with the Pittsburgh Steelers and Chicago Cardinals from 1949 to 1952 in the National Football League (NFL). He was a two-time Pro Bowler in 1950 and 1951. He is a member of the Georgia Sports Hall of Fame.

Geri played college football for the Georgia Bulldogs and was selected by the Steelers in the fourth round of the 1949 NFL draft. Geri also played punter in his short professional career.

== NFL career statistics ==
Legend
	Led the league
**Bold**	Career high

Year	Team	Games		Rushing					Receiving				
Year	Team	GP	GS	Att	Yds	Avg	Lng	TD	Rec	Yds	Avg	Lng	TD
1949	PIT	12	1	133	543	**4.1**	25	**5**	0	0	0.0	0	0
1950	PIT	12	8	**188**	**705**	3.8	**47**	2	1	33	**33.0**	33	**1**
1951	PIT	12	12	90	252	2.8	17	3	**3**	**59**	19.7	**49**	**1**
1952	CRD	12	4	20	50	2.5	21	0	0	0	0.0	0	0
		48	25	431	1,550	3.6	47	10	4	92	23.0	49	2
