= 1949 Washington Redskins season =

NFL team season

- Owner: George Preston Marshall
- General manager: Dick McCann
- Head coach: Herman Ball; John Whelchel
- Home stadium: Griffith Stadium

Results
- Record: 4–7–1
- Division place: 4th NFL Eastern
- Playoffs: Did not qualify

The 1949 Washington Redskins season marked the franchise's 18th year in the National Football League (NFL). The team failed to improve on their 7–5 record from 1948 and finished 4–7–1.

Although the NFL formally desegregated in 1946, many teams were slow to allow black athletes to compete even after the formal barrier had fallen. None were less willing to desegregate than the Washington Redskins, who sought to be the "home team" for a vast Southern market. The Redskins would remain the last bastion of racial segregation in the NFL, refusing to include a single black player on their roster until 1962.

== Preseason ==
Week	Date	Opponent	Result	Record	Venue	Attendance
1	August 26	at Los Angeles Rams	W 34–28	1–0	Los Angeles Memorial Coliseum	64,277
2	August 30	vs. Detroit Lions	W 31–7	2–0	University of Denver Stadium (Denver, CO)	13,985
3	September 4	vs. Chicago Bears	L 17–38	2–1	Crump Stadium (Memphis, TN)	14,986
4	September 10	vs. Chicago Cardinals	L 10–24	2–2	Legion Field (Birmingham, AL)	25,000
5	September 18	at Green Bay Packers	W 35–24	3–2	Wisconsin State Fair Park (West Allis, WI)	12,873

== Regular season ==
=== Schedule ===
Game	Date	Opponent	Result	Record	Venue	Attendance	Recap	Sources
1	September 26	at Chicago Cardinals	**L** 7–38	0–1	Comiskey Park	24,136	Recap	
2	October 3	at **Pittsburgh Steelers**	**W** 27–14	1–1	Forbes Field	30,000	Recap	
3	October 9	**New York Giants**	**L** 35–45	1–2	Griffith Stadium	30,073	Recap	
4	October 16	**New York Bulldogs**	**W** 38–14	2–2	Griffith Stadium	26,278	Recap	
5	October 23	at **Philadelphia Eagles**	**L** 14–49	2–3	Shibe Park	28,855	Recap	
6	October 30	at **New York Bulldogs**	**T** 14–14	2–3–1	Polo Grounds	3,678	Recap	
7	November 6	**Pittsburgh Steelers**	**W** 27–14	3–3–1	Griffith Stadium	26,038	Recap	
8	November 13	**Philadelphia Eagles**	**L** 21–44	3–4–1	Griffith Stadium	31,107	Recap	
9	November 20	Chicago Bears	**L** 21–31	3–5–1	Griffith Stadium	30,418	Recap	
10	November 27	at **New York Giants**	**L** 7–23	3–6–1	Polo Grounds	12,985	Recap	
11	December 4	Green Bay Packers	**W** 30–0	4–6–1	Griffith Stadium	23,200	Recap	
12	December 11	at Los Angeles Rams	**L** 27–53	4–7–1	L.A. Memorial Coliseum	44,899	Recap	
Note: Intra-division opponents are in **bold** text.

== Standings ==
NFL Eastern Division
	W	L	T	PCT	DIV	PF	PA	STK
Philadelphia Eagles	11	1	0	.917	8–0	364	134	W8
Pittsburgh Steelers	6	5	1	.545	4–4	224	214	W1
New York Giants	6	6	0	.500	3–5	287	298	L2
Washington Redskins	4	7	1	.364	3–4–1	268	339	L1
New York Bulldogs	1	10	1	.091	1–6–1	153	368	L5

Note: Tie games were not officially counted in the standings until 1972.

== Roster ==
1949 Washington Redskins final roster
Quarterbacks: 33 Sammy Baugh; 52 Harry Gilmer RB; Running backs: 26 Leon Cochran; 22 Harry Dowda CB; 21 Rob Goode CB; 51 John Hollar; 77 Tommy Mont QB; 25 Dick Poillon K/P; 34 Ed Quirk; 99 Eddie Saenz; 77 Pete Stout OLB; Receivers: 55 Hal Crisler; 28 Hugh Taylor; 37 Joe Tereshinski DE	Linemen/Linebackers: 42 John Adams DT/T; 57 John Badaczewski MG; 18 Ed Berrang DE/WR; 53 Al DeMao OLB/C; 31 Clyde Ehrhardt C; 48 Bob Hendren DT/T; 58 Mike Katrishen G; 47 Laurie Niemi DT; 19 Jim Peebles T/DT; 12 Herb Shoener DE; 63 Herb Siegert OLB/G; 60 Joe Soboleski DT/G; 16 John Steber G/MLB; 45 Dick Stovall MLB; 43 Len Szafaryn T	Defensive backs: 38 Clyde Goodnight CB/WR; 24 Howie Livingston CB/RB; 20 Dan Sandifer S/RB; rookies in italics
