= 1949 Green Bay Packers season =

NFL team season

- Head coach: Curly Lambeau
- Home stadium: City Stadium; Wisconsin State Fair Park

Results
- Record: 2–10
- Division place: 5th NFL Western
- Playoffs: Did not qualify

The 1949 Green Bay Packers season was their 31st season overall and their 29th season in the National Football League. The team finished with a 2–10 record under coach Curly Lambeau for a fifth-place finish in the Western Conference. This was the 31st and final season the Packers played under Lambeau, who resigned and then coached the Chicago Cardinals in 1950 and 1951 and the Washington Redskins in 1952 and 1953.

The 1949 season was also the final year for blue and gold jerseys, as the Packers switched to kelly green and yellow in 1950 under new coach Gene Ronzani, a graduate of Marquette University.

== Offseason ==
=== NFL draft ===
Round	Pick	Player	Position	School/club team
1	5	Stan Heath	Quarterback	Nevada
2	15	Dan Dworsky	Center	Michigan
3	25	Lou Ferry	Defensive tackle	Villanova
4	24	Bob Summerhays	Linebacker	Utah
5	43	Glenn Lewis	Back	Texas Tech
6	54	Joe Ethridge	Tackle	SMU
8	74	Dan Orlich	Defensive end	Nevada
9	83	Everett Faunce	Back	Minnesota
11	103	Harry Larche	Tackle	Arkansas State
12	114	Rebel Steiner	Defensive back	Alabama
13	123	Al Mastrangeli	Center	Illinois
14	134	Bobby Williams	Center	Texas Tech
15	143	Ken Cooper	Guard	Vanderbilt
16	154	Gene Remenar	Tackle	West Virginia
17	163	Paul Devine	Back	Heidelberg
18	174	Floyd Lewis	Guard	SMU
19	183	Bobby Folsom	End	SMU
20	194	Larry Cooney	Back	Penn State
21	203	Ken Kranz	Defensive back	Wisconsin-Milwaukee
22	214	John Kordich	Back	USC
23	223	Bill Kelley	Tight end	Texas Tech
24	234	Jimmy Ford	Back	Tulsa
25	243	Frank Lambright	Guard	Arkansas

== Regular season ==
=== Schedule ===
Game	Date	Opponent	Result	Record	Venue	Attendance	Recap	Sources
1	September 25	**Chicago Bears**	**L** 0–17	0–1	City Stadium	25,571	Recap	
2	October 2	**Los Angeles Rams**	**L** 7–48	0–2	City Stadium	24,308	Recap	
3	October 7	at New York Bulldogs	**W** 19–0	1–2	Polo Grounds	5,099	Recap	
4	October 16	**Chicago Cardinals**	**L** 14–39	1–3	State Fair Park	18,464	Recap	
5	October 23	at **Los Angeles Rams**	**L** 7–35	1–4	L.A. Memorial Coliseum	37,546	Recap	
6	October 30	**Detroit Lions**	**W** 16–14	2–4	State Fair Park	10,855	Recap	
7	November 6	at **Chicago Bears**	**L** 3–24	2–5	Wrigley Field	47,218	Recap	
8	November 13	New York Giants	**L** 10–30	2–6	City Stadium	20,151	Recap	
9	November 20	Pittsburgh Steelers	**L** 7–30	2–7	State Fair Park	5,483	Recap	
10	November 27	at **Chicago Cardinals**	**L** 21–41	2–8	Comiskey Park	16,787	Recap	
11	December 4	at Washington Redskins	**L** 0–30	2–9	Griffith Stadium	23,200	Recap	
12	December 11	at **Detroit Lions**	**L** 7–21	2–10	Briggs Stadium	12,576	Recap	
Note: Intra-division opponents are in **bold** text.

== Standings ==
NFL Western Division
	W	L	T	PCT	DIV	PF	PA	STK
Los Angeles Rams	8	2	2	.800	6–1–1	360	239	W1
Chicago Bears	9	3	0	.750	6–2	332	218	W6
Chicago Cardinals	6	5	1	.545	4–3–1	360	301	L1
Detroit Lions	4	8	0	.333	2–6	237	259	W2
Green Bay Packers	2	10	0	.167	1–7	114	329	L6

Note: Tie games were not officially counted in the standings until 1972.

== Roster ==
1949 Green Bay Packers final roster
Quarterbacks: 39 Stan Heath CB; 36 Jug Girard P/S; Running backs: 3 Tony Canadeo CB; 41 Ralph Earhart; 8 Bob Forte CB; 64 Ted Fritsch K; 7 Walt Schlinkman; Receivers: 48 Ted Cook CB/LB; 26 Bill Kelley DE; 38 Nolan Luhn	Linemen/Linebackers: 82 Ed Bell T/G; 33 Buddy Burris MG; 54 Larry Craig DE; 40 Roger Eason DT/G; 85 Joe Ethridge G; 18 Lou Ferry DT/T; 31 Roger Harding C/LB; 35 Glenn Johnson DT/T; 47 Paul Lipscomb T/DT; 58 Ed Neal MG/C; 63 Urban Odson T/DT; 49 Dan Orlich DE/WR; 23 Steve Pritko DE/WR; 22 Jay Rhodemyre C/LB; 77 Bob Summerhays LB/FB; 15 Damon Tassos G/LB; 79 Evan Vogds G; 45 Dick Wildung T/DT	Defensive Backs: 51 Irv Comp S; 27 Jack Jacobs P/S/QB; 42 Ken Kranz S/CB; Rookies in italics
