= Bob Balog =

American football player (1924–2011)

No. 56
- Positions: Center, linebacker

Personal information
- Born: November 2, 1924; Youngstown, Ohio, U.S.
- Died: May 3, 2011 (aged 86)

Career information
- College: Georgia, Denver
- NFL draft: 1949: undrafted

Career history
- Pittsburgh Steelers (1949–1950)

Career NFL statistics
- Games: 16
- Stats at Pro Football Reference

Robert Steven Balog (November 2, 1924 – May 3, 2011) was an American professional football player who was an offensive lineman and linebacker in the National Football League (NFL) for the Pittsburgh Steelers.

He played college football at the University of Denver.
