= Joe Abbey =

American football player (1925–2014)

No. 26, 39
- Position: End

Personal information
- Born: March 21, 1925; Denton, Texas, U.S.
- Died: March 6, 2014 (aged 88); Denton, Texas, U.S.
- Listed height: 6 ft 1 in (1.85 m)
- Listed weight: 202 lb (92 kg)

Career information
- High school: Denton
- College: North Texas (1946–1947)

Career history
- Chicago Bears (1948); New York Bulldogs (1949)

Awards and highlights
- All Lone Star Conference Team

Career statistics
- Receptions: 13
- Receiving yards: 177
- Receiving touchdowns: 0
- Stats at Pro Football Reference

Joseph Reed Abbey (March 21, 1925 – March 6, 2014) was an American football player and athletics administrator. He played college football for North Texas State, professional football for the Chicago Bears and New York Bulldogs. He served as athletic director at public school systems in Fontana and Chico, California, and at Parkland College. He was inducted into both the National Athletic Directors Hall of Fame and the University of North Texas Athletic Hall of Fame.

== Early years and military ==
Abbey was born in 1925 in Denton, Texas, and attended Denton High School. While in high school, he received three varsity letters in both football and basketball. Denton finished in 3rd in state in football in 1942 and made the playoffs in Abbey's senior year of 1943.

== College career ==
Abbey started his college career at the University of Texas where he was on the football team in 1944. He didn't earn a letter, but was given a reserve award. In Oct of 1944 he was drafted into the Army and left the team.

He served in the Army during World War II and was stationed in the Philippines starting in May of 1945 and returned by October of 1946.

In February 1947, after returning from the war, Abbey enrolled at the North Texas State Teachers College along with his former Denton High School and University of Texas teammate Zeke Martin where be played both football and basketball.

In Abbey's one season of North Texas football, the team won the Lone Star Conference championships in 1947, Abbey was a consensus selection to the All-Lone Star Conference Team and the team make it to the inaugural Salad Bowl, where he scored the team's only touchdown.

Abbey was also on the North Texas State 1948 "B" Team and earned a letter in basketball that year.

After attending spring workouts for both football and basketball, Abbey signed on to play professional football in the National Football League (NFL) for the Chicago Bears on May 24, 1948, with 2 years of eligibility remaining.

He was inducted into North Texas Athletic Hall of Fame in 2001.

== Pro Career ==
Abbey appeared in 10 games for the Bears at the end position during the 1948 season. He played some on offense (five receptions for 67 yards), but he gained particular notice for his work as a defensive end. After the 1948 season, Jake Lewis of the Denton Record-Chronicle wrote:

Abbey, who will probably go down as one of North Texas all-time stars, has already proved himself in the tough pro game. The big 200-pounder had to beat out some of the nation's leading ends last year to stay with the talent-loaded Bears. He went on to become one of George Halas' most dependable performers . . ."

Abbey started the 1949 season with the Bears, though he did not play and was either released by the Bears after suffering a knee injury, or traded. In October 1949, Abbey signed with the New York Bulldogs which reunited him with form Texas teammates Bobby Layne and Jim Canady. He appeared in six games for the Bulldogs and tallied eight receptions for 110 yards.

He skipped the 1951 season due to a knee operation and worked as the boxing coach - he had been a good boxer as a youth - at North Texas instead.

In the summer of 1951 was signed to go to the training camp of the Chicago Cardinals, but a few weeks later took a job as assistant football coach at Tarleton State College.

== Later life ==
After his playing career ended, Abbey finished his degree and then worked as a teacher, principal and coach for more than 35 years, including stints with Tarleton State and as the athletic director for school districts in Fontana and Chico, California. He concluded his career with 21 years as athletic director at Parkland College in Champaign, Illinois.

He was inducted into the National Athletic Directors Hall of Fame in 1988.

Abbey died in 2014.
