= Hal Prescott =

American football player (1920–2002)

No. 31, 86, 46
- Position: End

Personal information
- Born: October 18, 1920; Abilene, Texas, U.S.
- Died: May 1, 2002 (aged 81); Cisco, Texas, U.S.
- Listed height: 6 ft 1 in (1.85 m)
- Listed weight: 199 lb (90 kg)

Career information
- High school: Phoenix Union (Phoenix, Arizona)
- College: Hardin-Simmons
- NFL draft: 1943: 19th round, 178th overall pick

Career history
- Green Bay Packers (1946); Philadelphia Eagles (1947–1949); Detroit Lions (1949); New York Bulldogs (1949)

Awards and highlights
- 2× NFL champion (1948, 1949)

Career NFL statistics
- Receptions: 12
- Receiving yards: 185
- Touchdowns: 1
- Stats at Pro Football Reference

Harold Dougald Prescott (October 18, 1920 – May 1, 2002) was an American professional football player who was a wide receiver for four seasons for the Green Bay Packers, Philadelphia Eagles, Detroit Lions, and New York Yanks.
