= Darrell Hogan =

American football player (1926–2016)

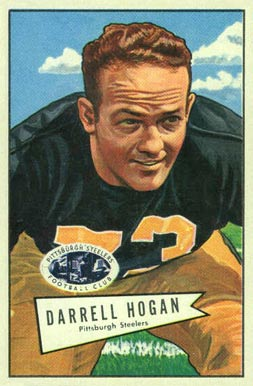
- Hogan on a 1952 Bowman football card

No. 73, 63
- Positions: Linebacker, guard

Personal information
- Born: July 2, 1926; San Antonio, Texas, U.S.
- Died: April 6, 2016 (aged 89); Bandera, Texas, U.S.
- Listed height: 5 ft 10 in (1.78 m)
- Listed weight: 210 lb (95 kg)

Career information
- High school: Hot Wells (TX)
- College: Baylor (1945–1946); Trinity (TX) (1947–1948)
- NFL draft: 1949: undrafted

Career history
- Pittsburgh Steelers (1949–1953)

Awards and highlights
- First-team All-Pro (1949)
- Stats at Pro Football Reference

Darrell Trayler Hogan (July 2, 1926 – April 6, 2016) was an American professional football player who played five seasons with the Pittsburgh Steelers of the National Football League (NFL). He played college football at Baylor University and Trinity University. He earned All-Pro honors as an undrafted rookie in 1949.

== Early life and college ==
Darrell Trayler Hogan was born on July 2, 1926, in San Antonio, Texas. His great-great-grandfather, Andrew Hogan, had immigrated from Ireland to Texas in 1842. Darrell attended Hot Wells High School in San Antonio.

Hogan lettered for the Baylor Bears of Baylor University from 1945 to 1946 before transferring to play for the Trinity Tigers of Trinity University from 1947 to 1948. He was a team captain both seasons at Trinity. He garnered first-team All-Lone Star Conference and honorable mention Little All-America recognition while at Trinity as well. He was inducted into the Trinity University Athletics Hall of Fame in 2003. Hogan was the first person from Trinity University to play in the NFL.

== Professional career ==
After going undrafted in the 1949 NFL draft, Hogan signed with the Pittsburgh Steelers on February 27, 1949. He started all 12 games for the Steelers during his rookie year in 1949, recording one interception and two fumble recoveries. He was named a first-team All-Pro by the International News Service for the 1949 season. Hogan started 12 games for the Steelers for the second consecutive season in 1950, totaling one interception and one fumble recovery. He became a free agent after the 1950 season and re-signed with the Steelers. He started all 12 games again in 1951 and made one interception. Hogan started all 12 games for the fourth straight season in 1952, accumulating four interceptions for 50 yards and one touchdown, one fumble, and one blocked kick/missed field goal return touchdown. Hogan started all 12 games for the fifth consecutive year during his final NFL season in 1953 and made one fumble recovery.

Overall, Hogan started every game for the Steelers from 1949 to 1953, accumulating career totals of seven interceptions, four fumble recoveries, one interception return touchdown, and one blocked kick/missed field goal return touchdown. He was later named to the Pittsburgh Steelers All-Time Team for their first 40 years. He was a linebacker for his entire pro career except for the 1950 season, in which he was listed as a defensive guard.

== Later life ==
Hogan later coached high school football and track in Texas for 20 years. Hogan was a fan of the Old West. He travelled the Western states every summer, buying and trading Western memorabilia. His obituary in The Monitor stated that "he watched Gunsmoke every day". Hogan died on April 6, 2016, in Bandera, Texas.
