= 1949 Detroit Lions season =

NFL team season

- Head coach: Bo McMillin

Results
- Record: 4–8
- Division place: 4th NFL Western
- Playoffs: Did not qualify

The 1949 Detroit Lions season marked their 20th year in the National Football League (NFL). The team improved on their previous season's output of 2–10, winning four games. They failed to qualify for the playoffs for the 14th consecutive season.

== Schedule ==
Game	Date	Opponent	Result	Record	Venue	Attendance	Recap	Sources
1	September 23	at **Los Angeles Rams**	**L** 24–27	0–1	L.A. Memorial Coliseum	17,878	Recap	
2	October 3	Philadelphia Eagles	**L** 14–22	0–2	Briggs Stadium	25,012	Recap	
3	October 8	at Pittsburgh Steelers	**L** 7–14	0–3	Forbes Field	21,355	Recap	
4	October 16	**Los Angeles Rams**	**L** 10–21	0–4	Briggs Stadium	19,839	Recap	
5	October 23	at **Chicago Cardinals**	**W** 24–7	1–4	Comiskey Park	23,215	Recap	
6	October 30	at **Green Bay Packers**	**L** 14–16	1–5	State Fair Park	10,855	Recap	
7	November 6	**Chicago Cardinals**	**L** 19–42	1–6	Briggs Stadium	22,479	Recap	
8	November 13	at **Chicago Bears**	**L** 24–27	1–7	Wrigley Field	37,303	Recap	
9	November 20	at New York Giants	**W** 45–21	2–7	Polo Grounds	21,338	Recap	
10	November 24	**Chicago Bears**	**L** 7–28	2–8	Briggs Stadium	24,385	Recap	
11	December 4	New York Bulldogs	**W** 28–27	3–8	Briggs Stadium	11,956	Recap	
12	December 11	**Green Bay Packers**	**W** 21–7	4–8	Briggs Stadium	12,576	Recap	
Note: Intra-conference opponents are in **bold** text. Thanksgiving: November 24.

== Standings ==
NFL Western Division
	W	L	T	PCT	DIV	PF	PA	STK
Los Angeles Rams	8	2	2	.800	6–1–1	360	239	W1
Chicago Bears	9	3	0	.750	6–2	332	218	W6
Chicago Cardinals	6	5	1	.545	4–3–1	360	301	L1
Detroit Lions	4	8	0	.333	2–6	237	259	W2
Green Bay Packers	2	10	0	.167	1–7	114	329	L6

Note: Tie games were not officially counted in the standings until 1972.

== Roster ==
1949 Detroit Lions roster
Quarterbacks (QB): 24 Fred Enke RB; 22 Clyde LeForce S; 28 Frank Tripucka; Running backs (RB): 11 Cloyce Box; 35 Bill Dudley K/P/CB; 18 Wally Triplett CB; 16 Camp Wilson; Wide receivers (WR): 81 John Greene; 87 Bob Mann; Tight ends (TE)	Offensive linemen (OL): 64 Howie Brown T; 63 Mario DeMarco G; 70 George Hekkers T/DT; 53 Jack Simmons C; 82 Cecil Souders T/DT; 67 Bill Ward G; Defensive linemen (DL): 85 Abe Addams DE; 65 Les Bingaman MG/G; 84 Barney Hafen DE/WR; 83 Kelley Mote DE/WR; 75 John Prchlik DT; 76 Mike Roussos DT/T; 86 Al Russas DE/T; 71 Russ Thomas DT	Linebackers (LB): 60 Chuck DeShane MLB/OLB/G; 38 Jim Mello MLB; 33 John Panelli OLB/FB; 53 Bob Pifferini OLB/C; Defensive backs (DB): 44 Don Doll S/RB; 19 Chick Maggioli CB; 40 Bob Smith CB/RB; Special teams (ST)	Reserve: 85 Sam Goldman DE (IR) (IR); 17 Mel Groomes CB/RB (IR); 76 John Treadaway DT/T (IR); Rookies in italics
