= George Papach =

American football player (1925–2022)

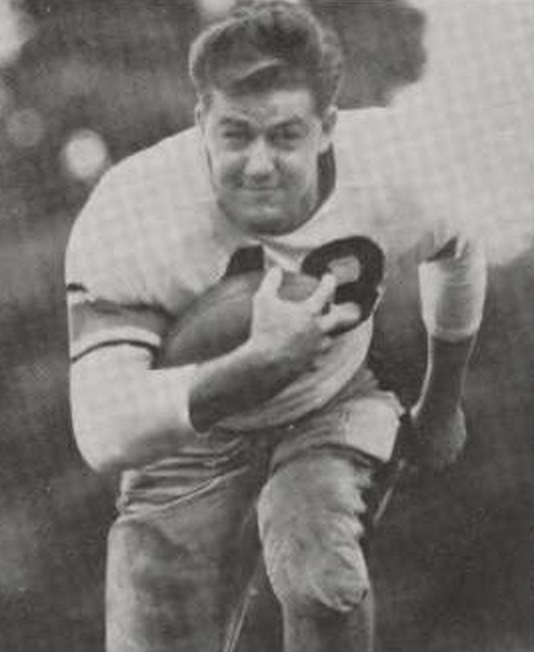
- Papach pictured in Debris 1947, Purdue yearbook

Profile
- Position: Fullback

Personal information
- Born: April 27, 1925; Youngstown, Ohio, U.S.
- Died: April 28, 2022 (aged 97)
- Listed height: 6 ft 2 in (1.88 m)
- Listed weight: 208 lb (94 kg)

Career information
- High school: Youngstown (OH) Chaney
- College: Purdue
- NFL draft: 1948: 12th round, 103rd overall pick

Career history
- Pittsburgh Steelers (1948–1949)
- Stats at Pro Football Reference

George Martin Papach (April 27, 1925 – April 28, 2022) was an American football fullback who played for the Pittsburgh Steelers. He played college football at Purdue University, having previously attended Chaney High School in Youngstown, Ohio. Papach died on April 28, 2022, one day after his 97th birthday.
