= Nick Scollard =

American gridiron football player (born 1920–1984)

No. 27, 53
- Positions: End, placekicker

Personal information
- Born: April 3, 1920; Indianapolis, Indiana, U.S.
- Died: November 29, 1984 (aged 64); Indianapolis, Indiana, U.S.
- Listed height: 6 ft 4 in (1.93 m)
- Listed weight: 217 lb (98 kg)

Career information
- High school: Central Catholic (Indianapolis)
- College: St. Joseph's (1939–1942)
- NFL draft: 1946: 2nd round, 12th overall pick

Career history
- Boston Yanks (1946–1948); New York Bulldogs (1949); Montreal Alouettes (1950)

Career NFL statistics
- Games played: 47
- Receptions: 15
- Receiving yards: 201
- Receiving touchdowns: 3
- Interceptions: 1
- Fumble recoveries: 2
- Field goals made: 6
- Field goals attempted: 18
- Field goal %: 33.3
- Points: 67
- Stats at Pro Football Reference

Career CFL statistics
- Games played: 12
- Field goals made: 3
- Singles: 2
- Points: 31

Nicholas Maurice Scollard (April 3, 1920 – November 29, 1984) was an American former professional football player. An end and placekicker, he played in the National Football League (NFL) with the Boston Yanks and New York Bulldogs. He played college football for the St. Joseph's Pumas. Scollard was also a member of the Montreal Alouettes of the Interprovincial Rugby Football Union (IRFU) for one season.

== Early life ==
Scollard was born on April 3, 1920, in Indianapolis, Indiana. He attended Central Catholic High School in Indianapolis.

== College career ==
Scollard played college football as an end for the St. Joseph's Pumas from 1939 to 1942. In 1941, he was an honorable mention to the Little All-America team. Scollard played in three College All-Star Games.

== Professional career ==
=== Boston Yanks ===
Scollard was selected in the second round, with the 12th overall selection, by the Boston Yanks in the 1946 NFL draft. In three years, he played in 35 games and made three field goals, 31 extra points, had 12 catches for 120 yards, one touchdown and 12 return yards. In a 7–16 loss to the Pittsburgh Steelers, Scollard jumped on a fumble in the end zone to score the team's lone points of the game.

=== New York Bulldogs ===
Scollard remained with the team through the relocation from Boston to New York, where he played in all 12 games of the 1950 season. He had three receptions for 81 yards, two touchdowns, one interception, one fumble recovery and 22 return yards. On June 1, 1950, Scollard became a free agent and retired from the NFL.

=== Montreal Alouettes ===
On August 17, 1950, Scollard signed with the Montreal Alouettes of the Interprovincial Rugby Football Union (IRFU). Before his debut, he quit the team because of an argument over a sweatshirt in the dressing room but rejoined the next day. In the first game, Scollard kicked a field goal in a 14–7 win over the Ottawa Rough Riders.

On November 4, against the Toronto Argonauts, he was banned for life for punching umpire, Jimmy Simpson. It resulted from a play that had no mention of it in the rulebook at the time. On a field goal attempt by Scollard from the Toronto 10 yard line, the ball hit the crossbar and bounced back into the field of play. Montreal quarterback, Frank Filchock, picked up the ball and threw it into the end zone to Scollard for what seemed to be a touchdown. None of the officials knew of the ruling, including Billy Foulds, the rules committee chairman of the Canadian Rugby Union. Eventually, Foulds ruled no score and Scollard punched Simpson in the chin, causing a four-stitch gash.

Scollard finished the season with three field goals, 20 extra point converts and two singles. He had a longest field goal made of 51 yards.

== Personal life ==
Scollard enlisted in the United States Army Air Forces in 1942, reaching the rank of staff sergeant. After his playing career, he was an official for the Indiana High School Athletic Association, chairman, committeeman, president of the park board for Indianapolis and a bailiff for juvenile court.
