= Bob Summerhays =

American football player (1927–2017)

No. 77
- Positions: Linebacker, fullback

Personal information
- Born: March 19, 1927; Salt Lake City, Utah, U.S.
- Died: May 4, 2017 (aged 90); Colorado Springs, Colorado, U.S.
- Listed height: 6 ft 1 in (1.85 m)
- Listed weight: 210 lb (95 kg)

Career information
- High school: East (Salt Lake City)
- College: Army; Utah
- NFL draft: 1949: 4th round, 34th overall pick

Career history
- Green Bay Packers (1949–1951)

Awards and highlights
- National champion (1945)

Career NFL statistics
- Rushing yards: 101
- Rushing average: 3.5
- Receptions: 1
- Receiving yards: 34
- Interceptions: 3
- Touchdowns: 1
- Stats at Pro Football Reference

Robert William Summerhays (March 19, 1927 – May 4, 2017) was an American professional football linebacker and fullback for the Green Bay Packers in the National Football League (NFL). Summerhays played collegiate ball for Army and the University of Utah before being drafted by Green Bay Packers in the 4th round of the 1949 NFL draft. He played professionally in the NFL for three seasons and retired in 1951.
