= Dan Orlich =

American football player (1924–2019)

No. 49
- Positions: Defensive end, end

Personal information
- Born: December 21, 1924; Chisholm, Minnesota, U.S.
- Died: January 18, 2019 (aged 94); Reno, Nevada, U.S.
- Listed height: 6 ft 5 in (1.96 m)
- Listed weight: 215 lb (98 kg)

Career information
- High school: Chisholm
- College: Northwestern (1943); Penn State (1944); Nevada (1947-1948)
- NFL draft: 1949: 8th round, 74th overall pick

Career history
- Green Bay Packers (1949–1951)

Career NFL statistics
- Interceptions: 1
- Fumble recoveries: 4
- Receptions: 5
- Receiving yards: 48
- Stats at Pro Football Reference

Dan (Buddy) Orlich (December 21, 1924 – January 18, 2019) was an American football player who was a defensive end in the National Football League (NFL). He was drafted by the Green Bay Packers in the eighth round of the 1949 NFL draft and played three seasons with the team. He was of Serbian descent. He died in January 2019 at the age of 94.

In addition to his success in the NFL, Dan is also considered to be the one of, if not the greatest, trapshooters who ever lived. Highlights include:

- From 1956 to 1971 Orlich captured 37 major trophies at the Grand American, including 13 major championships. He led the Introductory Singles in 1966, the Class Championships in 1959, the Clay Target in 1956 and 1970, the Champion of Champions from 1961 to 1963 and in 1971, the Zone Champion of Champions in 1962, 1965 and 1968, the All-Around in 1956, and the High-Over-All in 1966.
- Current number 2 record holder on singles averages, with his .9982 in 1968, second only to .9983 set in 1993.
- In doubles, Orlich was the first in history to break 100 three, four and five times. That was in 1958, 1961 and 1964.
- Orlich still is co-holder of a shoot-off record at the Grand, with his 1961 Champion of Champions title being a co-championship after he and George Snellenberger broke 100 straight and then ran another 500 extras. He also co-holds an all-around record. In 1958, he broke 399x400 of the championship targets at the Sahara Fall shoot to set an all-around record.
- The most consecutive Champion of Champions titles.
