= 1949 Chicago Bears season =

NFL team season

- Owner: George Halas
- Head coach: George Halas
- Home stadium: Wrigley Field

Results
- Record: 9–3
- Division place: 2nd NFL Western
- Playoffs: Did not qualify

The 1949 season was the Chicago Bears' 30th in the National Football League. The team failed to improve on their 10–2 record from 1948 and finished with a 9–3 record, under head coach and owner George Halas, but finished in second place in the NFL Western Division for a third time, missing out on a chance to add more league titles to their trophy case. The Bears were 3–3 at mid-season, then won their final six games.

The Los Angeles Rams (8–2–2) defeated the Bears twice, and won the division title. (Ties were disregarded in winning percentage calculation until 1972.) This was the first season the Bears donned their now famous rounded numerals.

== Regular season ==
=== Schedule ===
Week	Date	Opponent	Result	Record	Venue
1	September 25	at **Green Bay Packers**	**W** 17–0	1–0	City Stadium
2	October 2	at **Chicago Cardinals**	**W** 17–7	2–0	Comiskey Park
3	October 9	**Los Angeles Rams**	**L** 16–31	2–1	Wrigley Field
4	October 16	Philadelphia Eagles	**W** 38–21	3–1	Wrigley Field
5	October 23	at New York Giants	**L** 28–35	3–2	Polo Grounds
6	October 30	at **Los Angeles Rams**	**L** 24–27	3–3	Los Angeles Memorial Coliseum
7	November 6	**Green Bay Packers**	**W** 24–3	4–3	Wrigley Field
8	November 13	**Detroit Lions**	**W** 27–24	5–3	Wrigley Field
9	November 20	at Washington Redskins	**W** 31–21	6–3	Griffith Stadium
10	November 24	at **Detroit Lions**	**W** 28–7	7–3	Briggs Stadium
11	December 4	Pittsburgh Steelers	**W** 30–21	8–3	Wrigley Field
12	December 11	**Chicago Cardinals**	**W** 52–21	9–3	Wrigley Field
Note: Intra-division opponents are in **bold** text.

=== Standings ===
NFL Western Division
	W	L	T	PCT	DIV	PF	PA	STK
Los Angeles Rams	8	2	2	.800	6–1–1	360	239	W1
Chicago Bears	9	3	0	.750	6–2	332	218	W6
Chicago Cardinals	6	5	1	.545	4–3–1	360	301	L1
Detroit Lions	4	8	0	.333	2–6	237	259	W2
Green Bay Packers	2	10	0	.167	1–7	114	329	L6

Note: Tie games were not officially counted in the standings until 1972.

== Roster ==
Chicago Bears 1949 roster
Quarterbacks: 22 George Blanda K/P; 42 Sid Luckman; 32 Johnny Lujack K; Running backs: 57 J. R. Boone CB; 3 Wally Dreyer; 39 George Gulyanics P; 29 John Hoffman; 6 Don Kindt LB; 4 Dante Magnani CB; 11 Julie Rykovich; Receivers: 20 Jim Keane; 51 Ken Kavanaugh	Linemen: 41 Alf Bauman DT; 82 Ray Bray MG/G; 81 George Connor DT/T; 24 Fred Davis T/DT; 13 Jack Dugger DE/WR; 38 Bill Milner DE; 53 Pat Preston G; 23 Wash Serini G; 7 Ed Sprinkle DE/WR; 35 Paul Stenn T/DT; 45 Walt Stickel DT/T; 66 Bulldog Turner C	Linebackers: 31 Stu Clarkson OLB; 16 Ed Cody OLB/FB; 21 Chuck Drulis MLB/G; 9 Dick Flanagan OLB/G; 44 Frank Szymanski MLB/C; Defensive backs: 36 Bill DeCorrevont CB; 5 George McAfee S/RB; 33 Bob Perina CB; Rookies in italics
