= Carl Butkus =

American football player (1922–1978)

No. 47
- Position: Tackle

Personal information
- Born: December 26, 1922; Scranton, Pennsylvania, US
- Died: August 3, 1978 (aged 55); Washington, D.C., US
- Listed height: 6 ft 1 in (1.85 m)
- Listed weight: 245 lb (111 kg)

Career information
- College: George Washington

Career history
- New York Yankees (1948); Washington Redskins (1948); New York Giants (1949)
- Stats at Pro Football Reference

Carl John Butkus (December 26, 1922 – August 3, 1978) was an American football offensive tackle in the National Football League for the Washington Redskins and the New York Giants. He also played in the All-America Football Conference for the New York Yankees. He played college football at George Washington University.

== Military service ==
Butkus served in the United States Army in the World War II era and achieved the rank of sergeant.
