= Abe Addams =

American football player (1926–2017)

Profile
- Position: Defensive end

Personal information
- Born: July 12, 1926; Louisville, Kentucky
- Died: December 10, 2017 (aged 91); Louisville, Kentucky
- Listed height: 6 ft 2 in (1.88 m)
- Listed weight: 220 lb (100 kg)

Career information
- High school: Louisville (KY) Male
- College: Indiana
- NFL draft: 1949: undrafted

Career history
- Detroit Lions (1949)
- Stats at Pro Football Reference

Abraham Buchanan Addams Jr. (July 12, 1926 – December 10, 2017) was an American football end who played for the Detroit Lions. He played college football at Indiana University, having previously attended Louisville Male High School. He died on December 10, 2017, at the age of 91.
