= Jerry Nuzum =

American football player (1923–1997)

No. 22
- Positions: Halfback, fullback

Personal information
- Born: September 8, 1923; Clovis, New Mexico, U.S.
- Died: April 23, 1997 (aged 73); Monroeville, Pennsylvania, U.S.
- Listed height: 6 ft 1 in (1.85 m)
- Listed weight: 199 lb (90 kg)

Career information
- College: New Mexico State
- NFL draft: 1948: 3rd round, 20th overall pick

Career history
- Pittsburgh Steelers (1948–1951)

Career NFL statistics
- Rushing yards: 930
- Rushing average: 3.7
- Receptions: 14
- Receiving yards: 303
- Total touchdowns: 10
- Stats at Pro Football Reference

Jerry Hanson Nuzum (September 8, 1923 – April 23, 1997) was an American professional football player who was a running back for four seasons for the Pittsburgh Steelers. He was selected by the Pittsburgh Steelers in the third round (20th overall) of the 1948 NFL draft.
