= Jerry Shipkey =

American football player (1925–2009)

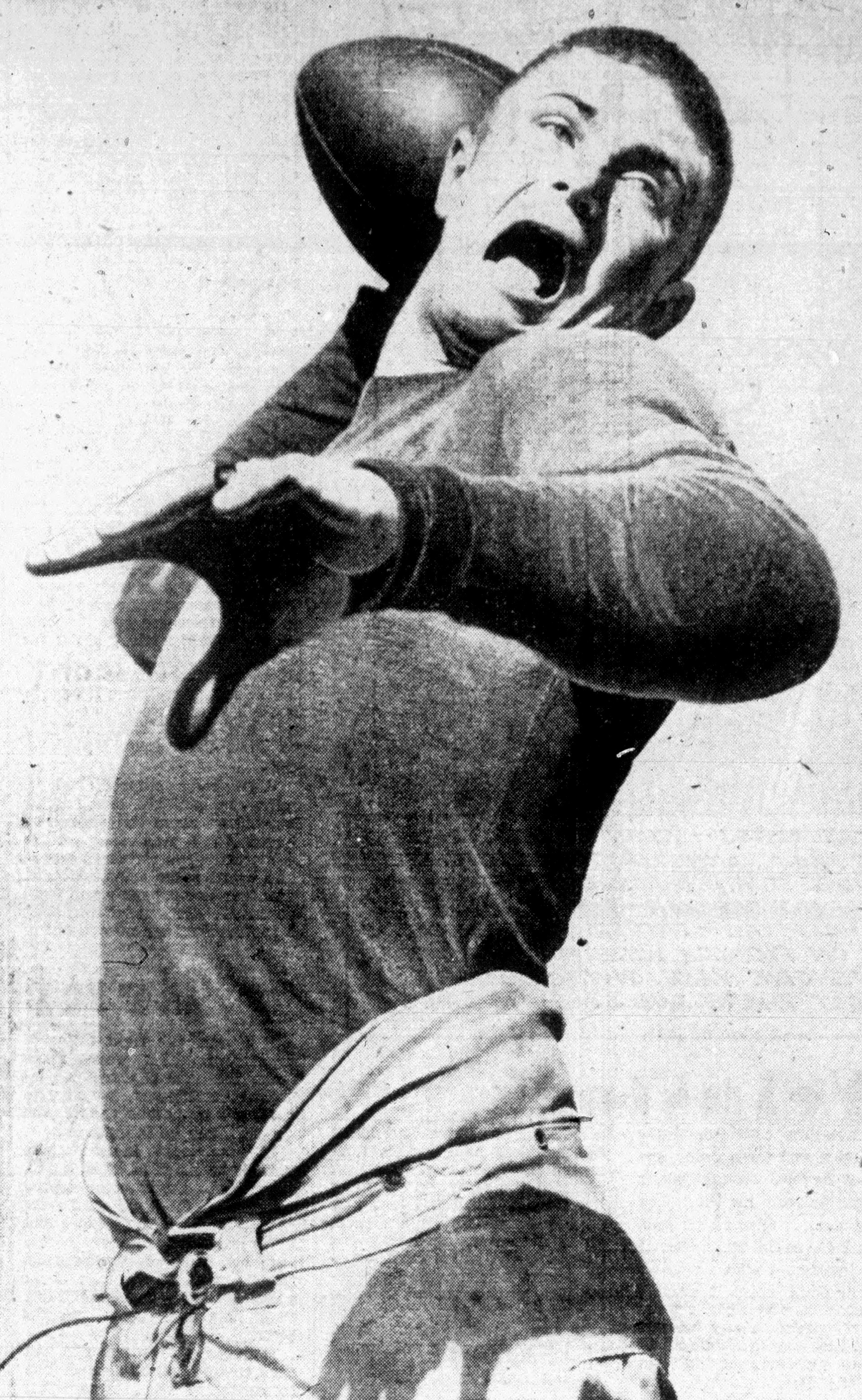

No. 49, 33, 23
- Positions: Linebacker, fullback, defensive back

Personal information
- Born: October 31, 1925; Fullerton, California, U.S.
- Died: November 28, 2009 (aged 84); Dana Point, California, U.S.
- Listed height: 6 ft 1 in (1.85 m)
- Listed weight: 213 lb (97 kg)

Career information
- High school: Anaheim (Anaheim, California)
- College: USC; UCLA
- NFL draft: 1947: 8th round, 58th overall pick

Career history
- Pittsburgh Steelers (1948–1952); Chicago Bears (1953)

Awards and highlights
- First-team All-Pro (1951); 3× Pro Bowl (1950, 1951, 1952); Pittsburgh Steelers Legends team; 2× Second-team All-PCC (1946, 1947)

Career NFL statistics
- Rushing yards: 310
- Rushing average: 2.8
- Receptions: 12
- Receiving yards: 138
- Total touchdowns: 17
- Stats at Pro Football Reference

Gerald Wade Shipkey (October 31, 1925 – November 28, 2009) was an American professional football player. He played as a linebacker for six seasons in the National Football League (NFL). He also played fullback, especially the first three years of his career.

In college, he played for USC before transferring to UCLA and is believed to be the only person to play in the Rose Bowl for both teams. He attended Anaheim High School.

Shipkey was also an All-American shot putter for the UCLA Bruins track and field team, finishing 5th at the 1947 NCAA track and field championships.
