= 1949 Los Angeles Rams season =

NFL team season

- Head coach: Clark Shaughnessy
- Home stadium: Los Angeles Memorial Coliseum

Results
- Record: 8–2–2
- Division place: 1st NFL Western
- Playoffs: Lost NFL Championship (vs. Eagles) 0–14

The 1949 Los Angeles Rams season was the team's 12th year with the National Football League and the fourth in Los Angeles. The Rams were 8–2–2 and won the Western Division title, then lost to the Philadelphia Eagles in the NFL Championship Game.

This is the only season where the Rams wore red jerseys at home and red helmets for both home and away games, the next season they would switch back to blue and yellow.

== Regular season ==
=== Schedule ===
Week	Date	Opponent	Result	Record	Venue	Attendance	Game recap
1	September 23	**Detroit Lions**	**W** 27–24	1–0	Los Angeles Memorial Coliseum	17,878	Recap
2	October 2	at **Green Bay Packers**	**W** 48–7	2–0	City Stadium	24,308	Recap
3	October 9	at **Chicago Bears**	**W** 31–16	3–0	Wrigley Field	42,124	Recap
4	October 16	at **Detroit Lions**	**W** 21–10	4–0	Briggs Stadium	19,839	Recap
5	October 23	**Green Bay Packers**	**W** 35–7	5–0	Los Angeles Memorial Coliseum	37,546	Recap
6	October 30	**Chicago Bears**	**W** 27–24	6–0	Los Angeles Memorial Coliseum	86,080	Recap
7	November 6	at Philadelphia Eagles	**L** 14–38	6–1	Shibe Park	38,230	Recap
8	November 13	at Pittsburgh Steelers	**T** 7–7	6–1–1	Forbes Field	20,510	Recap
9	November 20	at **Chicago Cardinals**	**T** 28–28	6–1–2	Comiskey Park	34,100	Recap
10	November 27	New York Bulldogs	**W** 42–20	7–1–2	Los Angeles Memorial Coliseum	38,052	Recap
11	December 4	**Chicago Cardinals**	**L** 27–31	7–2–2	Los Angeles Memorial Coliseum	74,673	Recap
12	December 11	Washington Redskins	**W** 53–27	8–2–2	Los Angeles Memorial Coliseum	44,899	Recap
Note: Intra-division opponents are in **bold** text.

=== Standings ===
NFL Western Division
	W	L	T	PCT	DIV	PF	PA	STK
Los Angeles Rams	8	2	2	.800	6–1–1	360	239	W1
Chicago Bears	9	3	0	.750	6–2	332	218	W6
Chicago Cardinals	6	5	1	.545	4–3–1	360	301	L1
Detroit Lions	4	8	0	.333	2–6	237	259	W2
Green Bay Packers	2	10	0	.167	1–7	114	329	L6

Note: Tie games were not officially counted in the standings until 1972.

== Playoffs ==
Round	Date	Opponent	Result	Venue	Attendance	Recap
Championship	December 18	Philadelphia Eagles	L 0–14	Los Angeles Memorial Coliseum	27,980	Recap

== Roster ==
1949 Los Angeles Rams roster
Quarterbacks: 47 Bobby Thomason; 25 Norm Van Brocklin; 7 Bob Waterfield K/P; Running backs: 30 Bob Agler; 18 Fred Gehrke; 40 Elroy Hirsch DE; 31 Dick Hoerner; 24 Tommy Kalmanir; 77 Vitamin Smith; 13 Tank Younger OLB; Receivers: 55 Tom Fears; 10 Tom Keane; 60 Bob Shaw	Linemen: 66 Gil Bouley DT/T; 63 Larry Brink DE; 86 Ed Champagne T/MG; 84 Hal Dean G; 46 Bud Hubbell DE/WR; 20 Dick Huffman DT/T; 27 Milan Lazetich MG/G; 23 Jack Martin C; 79 Bill Smyth DT/WR; 42 Al Sparkman T/DT; 54 Ray Yagiello G/MG; 56 Jack Zilly DE/WR	Linebackers: 9 Gerard Cowhig OLB/FB; 58 Jack FinlayOLB/G; 22 Fred Naumetz OLB/C; 57 Don Paul MLB/C; Defensive backs: 34 Don Currivan CB/WR; 17 George Sims CB; 33 Jerry Williams S/RB; Reserve list: -- Jim Winkler DT (Military); rookies in italics
