= John Whelchel =

American naval officer and football coach (1898–1973)

John Esten Whelchel
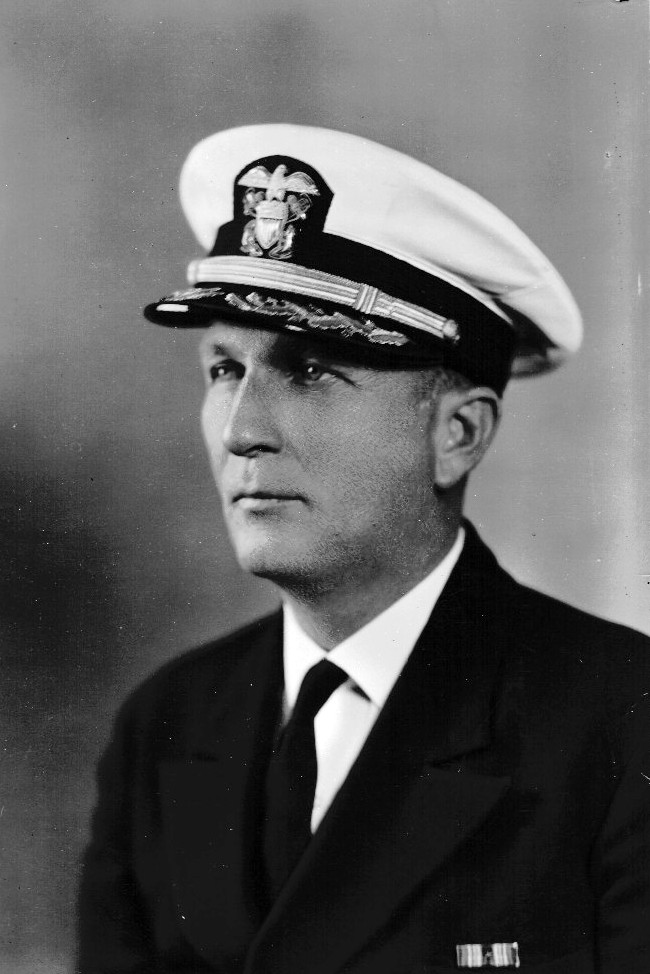
- Born: April 1, 1898; Hogansville, Georgia, U.S.
- Died: November 5, 1973 (aged 75); Portsmouth, Virginia, U.S.
- Military career
- Allegiance: United States of America
- Branch: United States Navy
- Service years: 1916–1949
- Rank: Vice Admiral
- Nickname: "Billick"
- Commands: San Francisco (CA-38); McCall (DD-400)
- Conflicts: World War I; World War II; Pacific War; Battle of Okinawa
- Awards: Legion of Merit (2); Bronze Star Medal
- Coaching career

Biographical details
- Education: United States Naval Academy

Playing career
- 1916–1919: Navy
- Positions: Quarterback, halfback

Coaching career (HC unless noted)
- 1919–1924, 1926: Navy (asst.)
- 1942–1943: Navy
- 1949: Washington Redskins

Administrative career (AD unless noted)
- 1943: Navy

Head coaching record
- Overall: 13–5 (college); 3–3–1 (NFL)

John Esten "Billick" Whelchel (April 1, 1898 – November 5, 1973) was a decorated officer in the United States Navy with the rank of Vice Admiral, American football player, coach, and college athletics administrator. He served as the head football coach at the United States Naval Academy from 1942 to 1943, compiling a record of 13–5. In 1949, he was the head coach for the National Football League's Washington Redskins, tallying a mark of 3–3–1.

== Early life ==
Whelchel was born on April 1, 1898, in Hogansville, Georgia, but he spent his childhood in Washington, D.C. His family had a deep history with the military: his maternal grandfather James Longstreet was a general for the Confederate States Army during the American Civil War while his older brother James Longstreet Whelchel went to the United States Military Academy.

After graduating from Western High School, Whelchel attended the United States Naval Academy in Annapolis, Maryland, where he played quarterback and halfback for the Navy Midshipmen football team. He was also on the school's basketball and baseball programs. He graduated in 1919. During his studies at the Academy, he also served in European water during World War I as a midshipman.

== Navy coaching career ==
Upon his return to the United States and graduation, Whelchel was assigned to the football coaching staff under head coach Gil Dobie followed by Dobie's successor Bob Folwell. In 1926, he helped out the school's freshman team. He served at the Academy until 1927, when he was transferred to the battleship USS Florida.

As his service in the Navy continued, Whelchel coached the football teams for various naval installations during the 1920s and 1930s beginning with the Florida. His service assignments at Norfolk Naval Shipyard and aboard the USS Idaho also saw coaching stints.

On June 22, 1938, now Lieutenant Commander Whelchel was appointed a Commanding Officer of newly commissioned Destroyer McCall (DD-400). McCall was assigned to the patrol duty in the Pacific and Whelchel spent next two years at sea with Destroyer Squadron Six, Battle Force, under the command of Freeland A. Daubin. He was finally succeeded by Lieutenant Commander Edwin G. Fullinwider on June 15, 1940.

Whelchel returned to the Naval Academy in 1941, where he became backfield coach of football team under Swede Larson. At the end of the season, Larson departed for the United States Marine Corps as the country entered World War II and Whelchel was promoted to head coach in his place. Whelchel inherited a team in a difficult situation as the demands of the war, which forced the Naval Academy to condense the academic curriculum into a three-year course, meant only six starters returned to the team for 1942. Prior to the season, he described the upcoming schedule as "suicide" and "about hopeless" to succeed in. While the Midshipmen regressed from their 7–1–1 record the previous year, they defeated Army to finish 5–4. On December 18, Whelchel was named Captain and the Naval Academy's new athletic director, the latter of which he took over from former college teammate Lyman S. Perry Sr.

The Midshipmen improved in 1943 to an 8–1 record and ranked fourth in the final AP poll. Whelchel's team developed a reputation for its strong defense, with an observer calling him "a great guy for rigging up a defense for one game. He isn't too fancy on attack, but he knows all the answers on defense." He won the Lambert Trophy at the end of the year.

When Whelchel was called into service in the Pacific theater, his position as head coach was filled by Commander Oscar Hagberg, who was returning from there.

== Sea duties during World War II ==
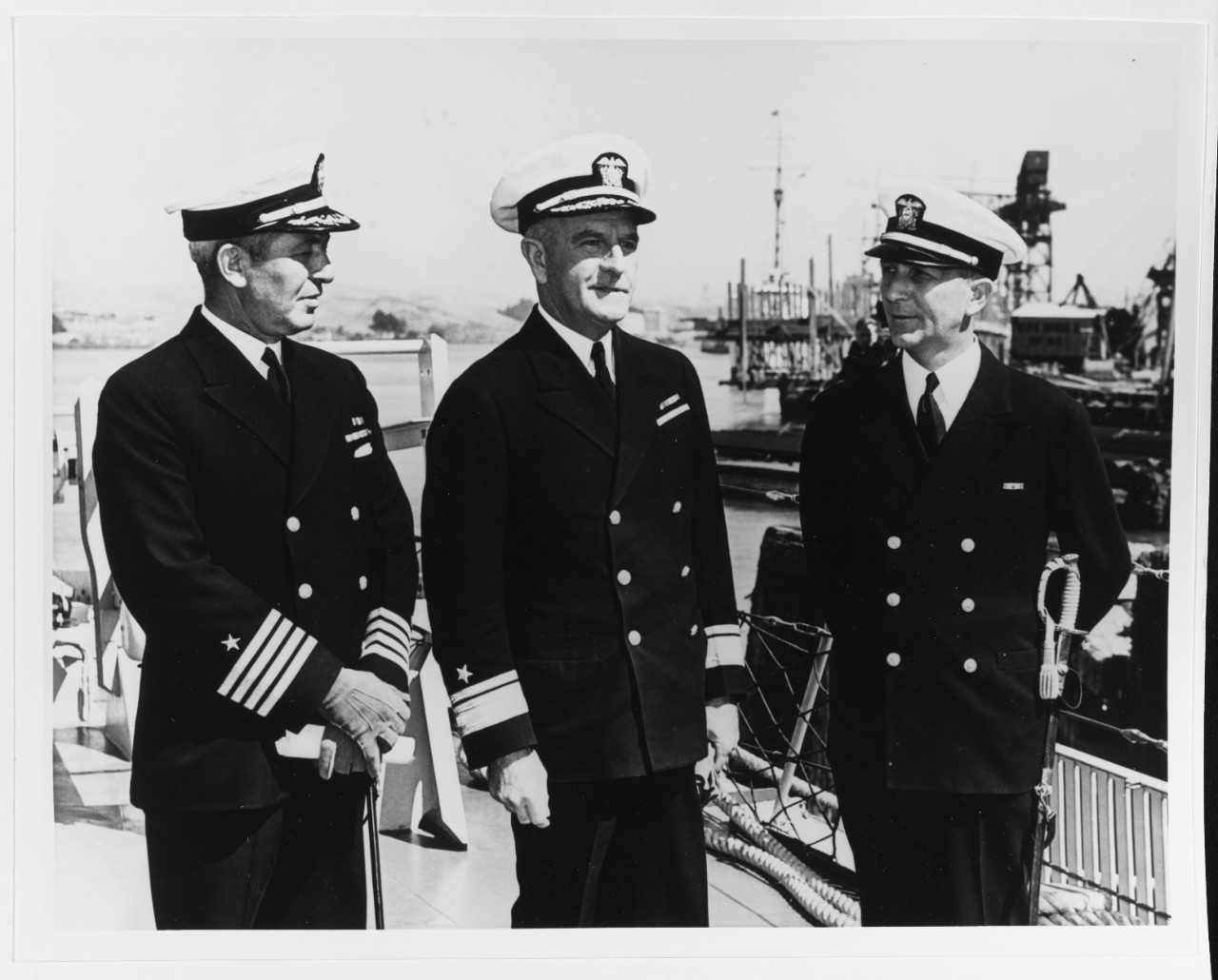
Commissioning ceremony of destroyer USS McCall at Mare Island Navy Yard in June 1938. Captain James L. Kauffman, Captain of the Yard (left) with Rear Admiral David W. Bagley (center), Commandant of the Yard and Whelchel, new commanding officer of McCall.

Whelchel was transferred to the Pacific theater in 1944 and subsequently took command of heavy cruiser USS San Francisco on March 10, 1945, where he succeeded another American football player Harvey Overesch. Whelchel commanded that ship during the Battle of Okinawa and was subsequently awarded with Legion of Merit with "V" Device and Bronze Star Medal for his leadership of the ship. In July, the Imperial Japanese Navy claimed to have sunk the San Francisco, which was refuted by the United States Navy.

Whelchel continued in command of the USS San Francisco and sailed toward the Philippines to prepare for an invasion of the Japanese home islands. The cessation of hostilities in mid-August, ceased any combat operations, and Whelchel began to prepare San Francisco for occupation duty. During August 1945, Whelchel commanded the ship during the show of force in the Yellow Sea and Gulf of Pohai areas and subsequently covered minesweeping operations.

On November 27, 1945, San Francisco was ordered back to the United States, arriving at San Francisco in the middle of December. Whelchel commanded the ship to the East Coast, where she arrived at Philadelphia for inactivation on January 19, 1946.

Whelchel was subsequently assigned to the Naval Station Pearl Harbor, where he was the chief of staff for the United States Pacific Fleet's ComServPac. He also returned to football as an assistant for the Hawaiian Warriors coached by Keith Molesworth. In November 1947, he was promoted to the rank of rear admiral. He also received his second Legion of Merit during his assignment.

Upon permission from Secretary of the Navy, John L. Sullivan, Whelchel retired from the active service in 1949. He was advanced to the rank of Vice admiral on the basis of combat citations. Whelchel was also eligible for retirement pensions due to the longevity of his service.

== Washington Redskins ==
In 1948, George Preston Marshall, the owner and president of the Washington Redskins of the National Football League, was unhappy with the work of Redskins head coach Turk Edwards. Despite the team's success in the first half of the decade, they suffered from a lack of continuity at the head coaching position as Edwards' predecessors Dutch Bergman and Dudley DeGroot resigned amid tensions with leadership. Marshall declared he would pursue a "nationally known coach", but surprised fans when he hired Whelchel instead; Marshall explained he selected Whelchel "out of hundreds of applicants" as he "like[d] his football ability." He signed a five-year contract to coach the team.

Although Whelchel ran the single-wing formation as Navy's head coach, he opted to retain the Redskins' T formation. He also kept Edwards' assistants Herman Ball, Frank Walton, and Wilbur Moore on his staff.

Despite not having coached in six years, Whelchel quickly developed a rapport with players. Redskins quarterback Sammy Baugh described Whelchel in Myron Cope's book, The Game that was:

Marshall thought the admiral would put a lot of discipline in the ball club. Well he showed up, and he looked like anything but an admiral. He was just a kind of average-looking guy, not very impressive. And the funny thing was, he turned out to be a real nice fellow. All the player liked him, although he wasn't as up on his football as he should have been.

Another Washington player, John Koniszewski, recalled his experiences with Whelchel at training camp:

He's using psychology on us, and I like it. Take that first day of camp, for example, when he let us play tough football and left us completely alone. We did more work than we would have done with routine stuff.

Whelchel's Redskins opened the 1949 season with a 38–7 loss to the Chicago Cardinals. The team rebounded with a win over the Pittsburgh Steelers, but alternated victories and defeats through the first five games. Although his tenure was still young, some of the Redskins' minority owners demanded Whelchel to be fired after a 49–14 rout by the Philadelphia Eagles that dropped them to 2–3. Marshall defended Whelchel as "I never fired a coach in the middle of the season."

Despite Marshall assuring his faith in Whelchel, the two clashed at times that included a quarrel after the owner attempted to have the offensive and defensive linemen switch positions; Marshall privately told Baugh, "I hired him for a disciplinarian. I didn't hire him for a goddamn coach." Reports also claimed pressure from the job caused Whelchel's weight to drop 30 pounds since the season began and he rarely slept.

After the Redskins tied the New York Bulldogs, whom they easily defeated earlier in the year, Whelchel was informed he would be dismissed following the next game against Pittsburgh. Publicly, the team insisted the two parties agreed to end their contract by "mutual agreement", while Marshall called it a "peculiar situation, but there's nothing for me to quote." Team vice president C. Leo DeOrsey, who wanted Notre Dame coach Frank Leahy, declared he "never was in favor of Whelchel's appointment in the first place."

At halftime of his final game, Whelchel told his players:

Gentlemen, this is my last game as coach of the Redskins. You are a fine group of men and a good football team. I wish you all success in the world in your future games. Washington will be proud of you." After a pause, he added: "I'd like to win this last game."

The Redskins beat the Steelers 27–14, and Whelchel was carried off the field by his players. Lewis F. Atchison of the Washington Evening Star wrote, "Carrying the admiral was no idle gesture, for he was one of the most popular coaches the Redskins have had since coming to Washington," while Associated Press writer Arthur Edson remarked, "What the fans didn't know was that the Redskins were carrying Whelchel off the field—and right out of the league."

Whelchel's record with the Redskins was 3–3–1. Asked about his firing, Whelchel simply called it "the whole story. There is nothing to add." He was replaced by Ball, and the Redskins concluded the 1949 season with a record of 4–7–1.

== Later life ==
After his dismissal from Redskins, Whelchel worked in real estate and then in farming. Vice admiral John Esten Whelchel died on November 5, 1973, in Portsmouth, Virginia at the age of 75. He was buried together with both his wives Virginia D. Hoover Whelchel (1897–1941) and Marion Payne Whelchel (1900–1980) at Arlington National Cemetery. He also had a son from his first marriage with Virginia D. Hoover, John Esten Whelchel, Jr. (1935–2008).

== Wartime decorations ==
Here is the ribbon bar of Vice admiral John E. Whelchel:

1st Row	Legion of Merit with Gold Star and "V" Device		
2nd Row	Bronze Star Medal	World War I Victory Medal with Atlantic Fleet Clasp	China Service Medal
3rd Row	American Defense Service Medal with Base Clasp	American Campaign Medal	Asiatic Pacific Campaign Medal with two service stars
4th Row	World War II Victory Medal	Navy Occupation Service Medal	Philippine Liberation Medal

== Head coaching record ==
=== College ===
Year	Team	Overall	Conference	Standing	Bowl/playoffs	AP^{#}
Navy Midshipmen (Independent) (1942–1943)
1942	Navy	5–4				
1943	Navy	8–1				4
Navy:		13–5				
Total:		13–5				
^{#}Rankings from final AP Poll.

=== NFL ===
Team	Year	Regular season					Postseason			
Team	Year	Won	Lost	Ties	Win %	Finish	Won	Lost	Win %	Result
WAS	1949	3	3	1	.500	fired mid-season	–	–	–	–
