= Charley Ewart =

American football player and coach (1915–1990)

Personal information
- Born: October 10, 1915; Lynn, Massachusetts, U.S.
- Died: April 30, 1990 (aged 74); Elk Grove, Illinois, U.S.

Career information
- College: Yale

Career history
- Philadelphia Eagles (1946–1948) Backfield coach; Philadelphia Eagles (1948) General manager; New York Bulldogs (1949) Head coach

Head coaching record
- Career: 1–10–1 (.125)
- Coaching profile at Pro Football Reference
- Executive profile at Pro Football Reference

Charles Ewart (October 10, 1915 — April 30, 1990) was the head coach for the New York Bulldogs in the 1949 NFL season. Before the Bulldogs, Ewart was a backfield coach for the Philadelphia Eagles in 1946 and promoted to general manager for the Eagles in 1948. Outside of the National Football League, Ewart was an FBI agent during World War II and the vice president of American Bakeries Company.

== Early life and education ==
Ewart was born on October 10, 1915, in Lynn, Massachusetts. He graduated from Yale University with a bachelor's degree and master's degree in the arts.

== Career ==
Ewart began his American football career as a college football quarterback for Yale from 1935 to 1937. After college, he continued to work in college football as a backfield coach for Wesleyan University in 1940 and Dartmouth College the following year. In 1946, Ewart began working in the National Football League as a backfield coach for the Philadelphia Eagles. Ewart was promoted to general manager for the Eagles in 1948. After the Eagles won the 1948 NFL Championship Game, Ewart became the youngest general manager to win an NFL Championship.

The next year, he became the head coach of the New York Bulldogs in the 1949 NFL season. After the end of the season, Ewart resigned from the Bulldogs with 1 win, 10 losses and 1 tie. Outside of sports, Ewart was an FBI agent in World War II as a part of the Manhattan Project. At the end of his career, Ewart worked in the food industry as the vice president of American Bakeries Company and director of marketing for General Foods.

== Death ==
Ewart died on April 30, 1990 in Elk Grove, Illinois.
