= 1949 Chicago Cardinals season =

American football team season

- Head coach: Phil Handler, Buddy Parker
- Home stadium: Comiskey Park

Results
- Record: 6–5–1
- Division place: 3rd NFL Western
- Playoffs: Did not qualify

The 1949 Chicago Cardinals season was the franchise's 30th season in the National Football League. The Cardinals missed the postseason for the first time since 1946. This season was the last time the Cardinals beat the Green Bay Packers on the road until 2018.

== Regular season ==
=== Schedule ===
Week	Date	Opponent	Result	Record	Venue
1	September 26	Washington Redskins	**W** 38–7	1–0	Comiskey Park
2	October 2	**Chicago Bears**	**L** 7–17	1–1	Comiskey Park
3	October 8	at Philadelphia Eagles	**L** 3–28	1–2	Shibe Park
4	October 16	at **Green Bay Packers**	**W** 39–17	2–2	Wisconsin State Fair Park
5	October 23	**Detroit Lions**	**L** 7–24	2–3	Comiskey Park
6	October 30	New York Giants	**L** 38–41	2–4	Comiskey Park
7	November 6	at **Detroit Lions**	**W** 42–19	3–4	Briggs Stadium
8	November 13	at New York Bulldogs	**W** 65–20	4–4	Polo Grounds
9	November 20	**Los Angeles Rams**	**T** 28–28	4–4–1	Comiskey Park
10	November 27	**Green Bay Packers**	**W** 41–21	5–4–1	Comiskey Park
11	December 4	at **Los Angeles Rams**	**W** 31–27	6–4–1	Los Angeles Memorial Coliseum
12	December 11	at **Chicago Bears**	**L** 21–52	6–5–1	Wrigley Field
Note: Intra-division opponents are in **bold** text.

== Standings ==
NFL Western Division
	W	L	T	PCT	DIV	PF	PA	STK
Los Angeles Rams	8	2	2	.800	6–1–1	360	239	W1
Chicago Bears	9	3	0	.750	6–2	332	218	W6
Chicago Cardinals	6	5	1	.545	4–3–1	360	301	L1
Detroit Lions	4	8	0	.333	2–6	237	259	W2
Green Bay Packers	2	10	0	.167	1–7	114	329	L6

Note: Tie games were not officially counted in the standings until 1972.

== Personnel ==
=== Staff / Coaches ===
1949 Chicago Cardinals staff
Front office: Principal / Majority Owner – Violet Bidwill Wolfner; General Manager – Ray Bennigsen; Coaching staff: Head Coach – Buddy Parker; Assistant Head Coach - Phil Handler; Assistant Coaches: Assistant Coach - Dick Plasman; Assistant Coach - Marshall Goldberg; Chief Scout - Marshall Goldberg	Special Teams Coaches: None - N/A

=== Roster ===
1949 Chicago Cardinals Roster
Quarterbacks: 44 Paul Christman; 21 Jim Hardy P; Running backs: 7 Elmer Angsman; 87 Babe Dimancheff; 34 Pat Harder K; 90 Vic Schwall; 62 Charley Trippi P; 33 Vinnie Yablonski K; Receivers: 41 Billy Dewell; 80 Malcolm Kutner CB; 61 Bob Ravensberg DE	Linemen/Linebackers: 68 Plato Andros T/G; 75 Ray Apolskis G/MG; 32 Vince Banonis C/LB; 57 Bill Blackburn MG/C; 11 Chet Bulger T/DT; 53 Jim Cain DE; 55 Bill Campbell LB; 67 Corwin Clatt LB; 50 Joe Coomer T/DT; 42 Bob Dove DE; 72 Bill Fischer T/DT; 82 John Goldsberry DE; 73 Hamilton Nichols G/MG; 18 George Petrovich G/T/DT; 20 Buster Ramsey G/LB; 51 Tom Wham DE/WR; 15 Bob Zimny T/DT	Defensive backs: 24 Red Cochran CB/RB/P; 31 Jerry Davis CB; 98 Bob Nussbaumer S; 37 Clarence Self CB; rookies in italics
