= 1949 NFL Championship Game =

Coordinates: 34.014°N 118.287°W

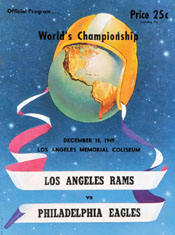
Philadelphia Eagles (Eastern) (11–1)	Los Angeles Rams (Western) (8–2–2)
14	0
Head coach: Greasy Neale	Head coach: Clark Shaughnessy
	1	2	3	4	Total
PHI	0	7	7	0	14
LA	0	0	0	0	0
- Date: December 18, 1949
- Stadium: Los Angeles Memorial Coliseum; Los Angeles, California
- Attendance: 27,980 (paid); 22,245 (actual)

TV in the United States
- Network: ABC
- Announcers: Harry Wismer, Red Grange

Location in the United States

The 1949 NFL Championship Game was the 17th title game for the National Football League (NFL), played on December 18 at the Los Angeles Memorial Coliseum in Los Angeles, California. It is remembered for the driving rain that caused the field to become a mud pit. Its paid attendance was 27,980, with only 22,245 in the stadium, which was a low in attendance not reached until 2020, which drew 24,835 because of global pandemic restrictions.

The game featured the Eastern Division champion Philadelphia Eagles (11–1), the defending NFL champions, against the Los Angeles Rams (8–2–2), winners of the Western Division. This was the first NFL title game played in the western United States. The Rams had last appeared in a title game in 1945, a victory and the franchise's final game in Cleveland.

The Eagles were favored by a touchdown, and won 14–0 for their second consecutive shutout in the title game. Running back Steve Van Buren rushed for 196 yards on 31 carries for the Eagles and their defense held the Rams to just 21 yards on the ground.

Philadelphia head coach Earle "Greasy" Neale did not like to fly, so the Eagles traveled to the West Coast by train. On the way west, they stopped in Illinois for a workout at Stagg Field at the University of Chicago on Wednesday morning.

== Scoring summary ==
Philadelphia Eagles 14, Los Angeles Rams 0

Quarter	1	2	3	4	Total
Eagles	0	7	7	0	14
Rams	0	0	0	0	0

at Los Angeles Memorial Coliseum, Los Angeles, California

- Date: December 18, 1949
- Game time: 1:30 p.m. PST
- Pro-Football-Reference

Game information
- First quarter
  - no scoring
- Second quarter
  - PHI – Pete Pihos 31-yard pass from Tommy Thompson (Cliff Patton kick). Eagles 7–0
- Third quarter
  - PHI – Leo Skladany 2-yard block punt return (Patton kick). Eagles 14–0
- Fourth quarter
  - no scoring

== Officials ==
- Referee: Ron Gibbs
- Umpire: Joseph Crowley
- Head linesman: Charlie Berry
- Back judge: Robert Austin
- Field judge: William McHugh
- Alternate: Rawson Bowen
- Alternate: Cletus Gardner

The NFL added the fifth official, the back judge, in 1947; the line judge arrived in 1965, and the side judge in 1978.

== Players' shares ==
The Eagles players earned $1,090 each and the Rams got $789, about one-third of what was expected with fair weather. Anticipating 70,000 or more in attendance and a large payoff from the gate, the players and owners wanted to postpone the game for a week, but were overridden by Commissioner Bert Bell, reached at home in Philadelphia.

Ticket prices were five dollars between the goal lines and $3.60 elsewhere.

== Television ==
This was the first NFL game which was broadcast on television, although only on the West Coast, under the auspices of Bell. The traditional 60–40 player bonus for playing in a championship game was augmented by $14,000 (presently$, 189,441) from the NFL. Although sources are unclear, a source writes the NFL received $20,000 (presently$, 270,629) from the broadcasting rights.

== Sources ==
- Lyons, Robert S. (2010). On Any Given Sunday, A Life of Bert Bell. Philadelphia: Temple University Press. 978-1-59213-731-2
- Coenen, Craig R. (2005). From Sandlots to the Super Bowl: The National Football League, 1920–1967. Knoxville, TN: The University of Tennessee Press. ISBN 1-57233-447-9
