= Herman Ball =

American football player and coach (1910–1999)

Personal information
- Born: May 9, 1910
- Died: January 12, 1999 (aged 88)

Career information
- College: Davis & Elkins College

Career history
- Washington Redskins (1949–1951) Head Coach
- Coaching profile at Pro Football Reference

Herman Ball (May 9, 1910 – January 12, 1999) was a football player and coach who was a long-time assistant in the National Football League (NFL) and served as head coach of the Washington Redskins from 1949 to 1951.

A native of Elkins, West Virginia, Ball attended Davis & Elkins College for three years beginning in 1932, helping the 1933 squad finish the season as the highest scoring team in college football with 345 points. Following his graduation, his first coaching position came in his home state as head coach at Ridgeley High School.

The following year, he moved south to begin a seven-year stint in Cumberland, Maryland, as head coach at Allegany High School. In his inaugural season at the helm, Allegany finished undefeated, the first of three spotless campaigns during his tenure, the others coming in 1940 and 1941. By the time he departed for the University of Maryland in 1943, he had compiled an impressive mark of 56–13–1.

Ball became an assistant with the Terrapins' football team, and also helped coach the school's baseball and basketball teams. During his third and final year in that role, he worked under the legendary Bear Bryant. Ball also worked part-time as a scout for the Redskins during the 1945 season, then joined the team the following year when he was hired as line coach.

On November 7, 1949, Redskins' first-year head coach John Whelchel was dismissed with the team sporting a 3-3-1 mark, with Ball being elevated to the position. In the team's final five games, Ball managed only one more win, then struggled the next year with a 3–9 mark, the worst record ever (at the time) for the franchise. Despite the miserable fortunes of the team, due in part to Ball's attempt at balancing the team's offensive attack with more of a running game, player loyalty and fan popularity helped Ball earn another year on the sidelines.

That term would be a short one when the Redskins began the 1951 NFL season with an 0–3 start. Ball was fired on October 18, a decision that helped bring about a bizarre situation in which his successor, former Bears assistant Hunk Anderson, was announced as Washington's new head coach, but was prevented from starting his new job because of contract issues with Chicago's George Halas. After refusing to provide compensation for Anderson, Redskin owner George Preston Marshall hired Ball's assistant, Dick Todd.

Serving as Washington's chief scout, Ball also returned to the sidelines as a Redskins' assistant until he resigned on December 17, 1954. He was hired three weeks later as an assistant coach for the Pittsburgh Steelers, spending one season in the Steel City until taking a similar position on February 2, 1956, under Weeb Ewbank with the Baltimore Colts.

Over the next seven years, Ball would help the team capture consecutive NFL titles in 1958 and 1959. When Don Shula replaced Ewbank after the 1962 NFL season, Ball was dismissed and signed as offensive line coach of the American Football League's Buffalo Bills on February 9, 1963. He spent one year there until returning to the NFL when former Redskins head coach Joe Kuharich took over the same role with the Philadelphia Eagles.

In five seasons, the team's best finish was in 1966, when they finished 9-5 and competed in the Playoff Bowl, but following a 2-12 finish in 1968, Kuharich and his staff were fired, although Ball remained as the team's director of player personnel. He remained in that role until announcing his retirement on December 23, 1977, staying on as a consultant until the end of the 1986 NFL season.

He died at the age of 88 at a Paoli, Pennsylvania, hospital of complications from a heart ailment.
