= 1950 NFL season =

American football season

Regular season
- Duration: September 16 – December 10, 1950
- American Conf. Champions: Cleveland Browns
- National Conf. Champions: Los Angeles Rams

Championship Game
- Champions: Cleveland Browns

NFL teams: National, American

The 1950 NFL season was the 31st regular season of the National Football League. The acquisition of three former All-America Football Conference (AAFC) franchises expanded the league to 13 teams. Meanwhile, television brought a new era to the game. The Los Angeles Rams became the first NFL team to have all of its games – both home and away – televised. The Washington Redskins became the second team to put their games on TV. Other teams arranged to have selected games televised.

== The AAFC collapse ==
The AAFC folded prior to the season, announced on December 9, 1949. Three AAFC teams — Cleveland Browns, San Francisco 49ers, and Baltimore Colts — joined the NFL intact. The players of the former AAFC New York Yankees were divided up between the New York Giants and the New York Yanks, the Los Angeles Dons and Los Angeles Rams merged, and a portion of the AAFC Buffalo Bills was absorbed into the Browns organization. A special dispersal draft was then held by the league's 13 teams on June 2, 1950, to allocate the rest of the AAFC players.

The 13 teams were realigned into the American and National divisions, which lasted for three seasons. The merged league briefly flirted with the name "National-American Football League", but kept the name "National Football League" a few months later on March 3, 1950. Under the alignment, both divisions had a team in New York and Chicago. The "American Division" (formerly the Eastern Division) had six teams including the Giants and the Cardinals, and the "National Division" (the old Western Division) had seven teams including the Yanks and the Bears, as well as the original Baltimore Colts.

Baltimore was declared a "swing team" and played one game against 10 of the other 12 NFL clubs and twice against Washington. The original intent of the merger was to have the popular Cleveland Browns serve as the swing team for two years to equally help gate receipts throughout the league, however, this was refused point blank by Paul Brown. Over a 13-week season, one team was idle each week while the other 12 met in the six scheduled games. Each team played a home-and-away game against the other five teams in their conference, one game outside the conference, and one game against Baltimore over the course of a 12-game schedule.

The league also established the Pro Bowl in the 1950 season. Though the league had attempted an all-star game annually between 1938 and 1942, it had cancelled the game because of World War II and did not revive it when the war ended. Unlike the previous all-star game format, which pitted the league's most recent champion against the league's best all-stars, the Pro Bowl would pit two all-star teams, one from each division, against each other.

Also, the 1950 season saw the first game played outside the United States when the New York Giants played the Ottawa Rough Riders of the Interprovincial Rugby Football Union in an exhibition match on August 12. The Giants and Rough Riders would repeat the feat in 1951; the Giants handily won both games.

== Draft ==
The 1950 NFL draft was held from January 20–21, 1950, at The Bellevue-Stratford Hotel in Philadelphia. With the first pick, the Detroit Lions selected end Leon Hart from the University of Notre Dame.

== Major rule changes ==
- The free substitution rule (any or all of the players may be replaced by substitutes after any play) was restored on a permanent basis. This change paved the way for player specialization in pro football, including three separate units for each team: offensive team, defensive team, and special teams.
- If a backwards pass or fumble goes out of bounds before it is recovered, the team that had control of the ball last maintains possession.

== Regular season ==
=== Highlights ===
- Week 1 The opening game of the 1950 NFL season was a matchup between the defending champions of the AAFC and the NFL, the Cleveland Browns and the Philadelphia Eagles, respectively. There was tremendous anticipation from fans and the press, which called the game "The World Series of Pro Football". The teams had never met prior to September 16, 1950, and a crowd of 71,237 turned out in Philadelphia. The Browns won 35–10. The First Fifty Years, a 1969 book that chronicles the first half-century of the NFL, listed the game as one of "Ten [Games] That Mattered" in bringing nationwide prestige to the league.
- In Week 3 (October 1), the New York Giants handed the Browns their first shutout ever, winning 6–0 in Cleveland while grounding Otto Graham's passing attack.
- In Week 5 (October 15), the Steelers beat the Giants 17–6 at the Polo Grounds, knocking them out of the American Division lead. The other New York team, the Yanks, had a share of the lead in the National Division after a 29–24 win in Yankee Stadium over the 49ers, but only 5,740 fans turned out to watch.
- The Browns-Giants rematch took place on October 22 in Week 6 in New York, and the Giants won again, 17–13. In the west, the Colts scored four touchdowns against the Rams, but the Rams had ten in a 70–27 blowout.
- Los Angeles had a 65–24 win over Detroit in Week 7 (October 29), which saw the Eagles reclaim the lead in their conference with a 35–3 win over Washington and the Giants' 17–3 loss to the Cardinals. In the other New York-Chicago game, the Yanks raised their record to 6–1–0 with a 38–27 win over the Bears.
- The Yanks were idle in Week 8 (November 6), in which field goals played a prominent role. Pittsburgh's Joe Geri booted all the points in the Steelers' 9–7 win over the Eagles, and the Giants' Ray Poole made a 40-yard kick with 0:04 left to beat Washington 24–21. The Browns regained the lead of the American conference in a 10–7 win over the Cards, with the margin being a Lou Groza field goal.
- In Week 9 (November 13), the New York Yanks lost their rematch with the Bears, 28–20, putting both teams at 6–2, while the Rams took the lead in the National with a 45–7 win over Green Bay. Meanwhile, former AAFC teams Cleveland and San Francisco met for the first time in the NFL, with the Browns winning 34–17 to stay in front in the American.
- A crowd of 42,673 turned out at Yankee Stadium to watch the New York Yanks, who lost to the Rams 43–35 in Week 10 (November 20), as L.A. and Cleveland kept their leads.
- The big game of Week 11 on November 27 was in Chicago, where the Bears took a 24–0 lead over the Rams on the way to a 24–14 win, and a half-game lead (8–2 vs. 8–3) over them in the National Division. Cleveland had a bye week, and the Giants 7–3 win over the Eagles tied them with the Browns in the American, with 8–2 records.
- On December 3, 1950, all six of the Week 12 games had significance. Taunted as a team that couldn't win a game without passing, the Cleveland Browns won again against the Eagles, 13–7, this time without Otto Graham attempting a pass. There were 17 punt returns, 12 by Philadelphia, both records. In New York, George Taliaferro had a record 8 kickoff returns for the Yanks in a 51–7 loss to the Giants. Both the Browns and Giants stayed tied in the American Division with records of 9–2–0. Bill Dudley of Washington returned a punt 96 yards for a touchdown in a 24–7 win over the Steelers. In the National Division, Cloyce Box of Detroit had 302 yards receiving, one yard short of the NFL record, in a 45–21 win over Baltimore. Tom Fears had an NFL record 18 pass receptions for the Rams in a 51–14 win over Green Bay and a 9–3–0 record to lead the division. Meanwhile, the Bears were upset by the crosstown Cardinals, 20–10, dropping them to 8–3–0, a half-game behind L.A.
- In the final week, Week 13, the Browns, Giants and Bears were all in must-win situations, while the Rams had finished their season at 9–3–0. The Bears, at 8–3–0, were tied 3–3 with the Lions after three quarters. George Blanda booted a 22-yard field goal and Chicago held on for a 6–3 win to give them a 9–3–0 record and a tie for the National Division title with the Rams. The Browns and Giants were both at 9–2–0, and both were playing on the road. Cleveland handled Washington 45–21, while the Giants had to fight off numerous drives by Philadelphia to protect a 9–7 win. With ties for first place in both divisions, the NFL title game had to be delayed a week while an unprecedented four team playoff took place. The Giants and Browns would meet in Cleveland, while the Bears and the Rams would meet in Los Angeles.

=== Division races ===
Week	National		American	
1	3 teams (Bears, Det, NYY)	1–0–0	3 teams (Cle, NYG, Was)	1–0–0
2	Tie: (Bears, Lions) and	2–0–0	Cleveland Browns	2–0–0
3	4 teams (Bears, Det, GB, LA	2–1–0	New York Giants	2–0–0
4	3 teams (Bears, Det, NYY)	3–1–0	New York Giants	3–0–0
5	Tie: (Bears, Yanks)	4–1–0	Cleveland Browns	4–1–0
6	New York Yanks	5–1–0	Tie: (Giants, Phi)	4–1–0
7	New York Yanks	6–1–0	Philadelphia Eagles	5–1–0
8	New York Yanks	6–1–0	Cleveland Browns	6–2–0
9	Los Angeles Rams	7–2–0	Cleveland Browns	7–2–0
10	Los Angeles Rams	8–2–0	Cleveland Browns	8–2–0
11	Chicago Bears	8–2–0	Tie: (Browns, Giants)	8–2–0
12	Los Angeles Rams	9–3–0	Tie: (Browns, Giants)	9–2–0
13	(tie) Chicago Bears	9–3–0	(tie) Cleveland Browns	10–2–0
	Los Angeles Rams	9–3–0	New York Giants	10–2–0

== Final standings ==
NFL American Conference
	W	L	T	PCT	CONF	PF	PA	STK
Cleveland Browns	10	2	0	.833	8–2	310	144	W6
New York Giants	10	2	0	.833	8–2	268	150	W6
Pittsburgh Steelers	6	6	0	.500	5–5	180	195	W1
Philadelphia Eagles	6	6	0	.500	4–6	254	141	L4
Chicago Cardinals	5	7	0	.417	3–6	233	287	L1
Washington Redskins	3	9	0	.250	1–8	232	326	L1

Note: Tie games were not officially counted in the standings until 1972.

NFL National Conference
	W	L	T	PCT	CONF	PF	PA	STK
Los Angeles Rams	9	3	0	.750	9–2	466	309	W1
Chicago Bears	9	3	0	.750	8–2	279	207	W1
New York Yanks	7	5	0	.583	7–4	366	367	W1
Detroit Lions	6	6	0	.500	5–6	321	285	L1
San Francisco 49ers	3	9	0	.250	3–8	213	300	W1
Green Bay Packers	3	9	0	.250	2–9	244	406	L2
Baltimore Colts	1	11	0	.083	1–4	213	462	L5

Note: Tie games were not officially counted in the standings until 1972.

== Playoffs ==
The only scheduled playoff game was the championship game. The two division playoffs were tiebreakers.

Division tiebreaker playoff
December 17 – Los Angeles
Chicago Bears	14
Los Angeles	24
December 17 – Cleveland
New York	3
Cleveland	8

NFL Championship
December 24 – Cleveland
Los Angeles	28
Cleveland	30

== Records, milestones, and notable statistics ==
=== League leaders ===
Statistic	Name	Team	Yards
Passing	Bobby Layne	Detroit	2323
Rushing	Marion Motley	Cleveland	810
Receiving	Tom Fears	Los Angeles	1116

=== NFL records set or tied in 1950 ===
- Most points per game, season (min 10 games), 38.83

Los Angeles Rams: (466 points in 12 games)

- Most games scoring 50+ points, season, 3

New York Giants
Los Angeles Rams

- Most points, single team, one quarter, 41 (tied)

Los Angeles Rams vs Detroit Lions (3rd Quarter), Oct 29, 1950

- Most points, both teams, third quarter, 48

Los Angeles Rams (41) vs Detroit Lions (7), Oct 29, 1950

- Fewest field goals, season (Since 1932), 0 (tied)

Baltimore Colts

== Coaching changes ==
- Baltimore Colts: Clem Crowe became the team's new coach for 1950. Cecil Isbell, the Colts' first of 4 head coaches in team history, was fired four games into the 1949 AAFC season, and was replaced by Walter Driskill.
- Chicago Cardinals: Curly Lambeau joined as new head coach. Phil Handler and Buddy Parker served as co-head coaches for the first six games in 1949, and then Parker became sole head coach for the last six contests.
- Green Bay Packers: Curly Lambeau resigned and joined the Cardinals. Gene Ronzani became the new Packers head coach.
- Los Angeles Rams: Clark Shaughnessy was replaced by Joe Stydahar.
- New York Yanks: Charley Ewart was replaced by Red Strader.

Head coaches of the merged 1950 NFL regular season
American Conference	National Conference
Chi Cardinals: Curly Lambeau	Baltimore: Clem Crowe
Cleveland: Paul Brown	Chi Bears: George Halas
NY Giants: Steve Owen	Detroit: Bo McMillin
Philadelphia: Greasy Neale	Green Bay: Gene Ronzani
Pittsburgh: John Michelosen	Los Angeles: Joe Stydahar
Washington: Herman Ball	NY Yanks: Red Strader
	San Francisco: Buck Shaw

== Stadium changes ==
- Baltimore Colts: Baltimore's Municipal Stadium was renamed Memorial Stadium
- New York Yanks: The Yanks moved from the Polo Grounds to Yankee Stadium
