= 1949 NFL season =

American football season

Regular season
- Duration: September 22 – December 18, 1949
- East Champions: Philadelphia Eagles
- West Champions: Los Angeles Rams

Championship Game
- Champions: Philadelphia Eagles

NFL teams: West, East

The 1949 NFL season was the 30th regular season of the National Football League. Prior to the season, Boston Yanks owner Ted Collins asked the league to fold his team due to financial woes and give him a new one in New York City. This new team would be called the New York Bulldogs. The franchise, which has never missed a season in some form, carried on the legacy of the final Ohio League member Dayton Triangles, and the players and assets of the Boston Yanks moved to New York but did not fold. As a result of the move, professional football did not return to Boston until the Boston Patriots of the 4th American Football League began play in 1960.

As the regular season came to a close, a merger agreement between the NFL and the All-America Football Conference was announced on December 9. Three AAFC teams joined the NFL in 1950, the Cleveland Browns, San Francisco 49ers, and the original Baltimore Colts.

The season ended on December 18 with the NFL Championship Game. In muddy conditions, the visiting Philadelphia Eagles defeated the Los Angeles Rams 14–0, as heavy rain in southern California kept the attendance under 23,000 at the Los Angeles Memorial Coliseum. Both teams had potent offenses but were severely limited by the poor field conditions. The management of the Eagles and Rams had favored a postponement for a week but were overruled by commissioner Bert Bell.

== Draft ==
The 1949 NFL draft was held on December 21, 1948, at The Bellevue-Stratford Hotel in Philadelphia. With the first pick, the Philadelphia Eagles selected center Chuck Bednarik from the University of Pennsylvania.

== Major rule changes ==
- The free substitution rule (any or all of the players may be replaced by substitutes after any play) was re-adopted for one year. The rule was previously adopted in 1943 in response to the depleted rosters during World War II but repealed in 1946.
- Plastic helmets allowed again, after being outlawed in 1948.

== Division races ==
In the Eastern Division, Philadelphia and Pittsburgh both had records of 4–1–0 when they met in Week Six. The Eagles won 38–7 and kept the lead for the remainder of the season. In the Western Division, the Rams got off to a 6–0–0 start while the Bears were 3–3–0 at midseason. Though the Bears won all of their remaining games, they never caught up to the Rams, who finished at 8–2–2.

Had the current (post-1972) system of counting ties as half a win and half a loss been in place in 1949, the Rams would have required a playoff with the Bears for the Western Division.

== Final standings ==
NFL Eastern Division
	W	L	T	PCT	DIV	PF	PA	STK
Philadelphia Eagles	11	1	0	.917	8–0	364	134	W8
Pittsburgh Steelers	6	5	1	.545	4–4	224	214	W1
New York Giants	6	6	0	.500	3–5	287	298	L2
Washington Redskins	4	7	1	.364	3–4–1	268	339	L1
New York Bulldogs	1	10	1	.091	1–6–1	153	368	L5

Note: Tie games were not officially counted in the standings until 1972.

NFL Western Division
	W	L	T	PCT	DIV	PF	PA	STK
Los Angeles Rams	8	2	2	.800	6–1–1	360	239	W1
Chicago Bears	9	3	0	.750	6–2	332	218	W6
Chicago Cardinals	6	5	1	.545	4–3–1	360	301	L1
Detroit Lions	4	8	0	.333	2–6	237	259	W2
Green Bay Packers	2	10	0	.167	1–7	114	329	L6

== NFL Championship Game ==
Philadelphia 14, Los Angeles 0 at Los Angeles Memorial Coliseum, Los Angeles, December 18, 1949.

== League leaders ==
Statistic	Name	Team	Yards
Passing	Johnny Lujack	Chicago Bears	2658
Rushing	Steve Van Buren	Philadelphia	1146
Receiving	Bob Mann	Detroit	1014

== Coaching changes ==
- Chicago Cardinals: Jimmy Conzelman left the team. Phil Handler and Buddy Parker served as co-head coaches of the Cardinals for the first six games of 1949. Parker then was the sole head coach for the last six games.
- New York Bulldogs: Charley Ewart replaces Clipper Smith as the head coach of the newly relocated team.
- Washington Redskins: Turk Edwards was replaced by John Whelchel. Whelchel was released after seven games, and Herman Ball then became the new Redskins head coach.

== Stadium changes ==
The New York Bulldogs began play at the Polo Grounds, sharing it with the Giants.
