= 1948 AAFC draft =

American football draft

General information
- Date: December 17, 1947
- Location: New York, NY

Overview
- 217 total selections in 30 rounds
- League: AAFC
- First selection: Tony Minisi, B University of Pennsylvania

The 1948 AAFC draft was the second collegiate draft of the All-America Football Conference (AAFC). The draft expanded to 30 rounds, but not all teams selected in each round. For example: Baltimore and Chicago were the only teams with picks in the second round. Chicago, Brooklyn and Baltimore had 5 selections in the first 5 rounds, while Cleveland and New York which were stronger teams had only 2.

== Player selections ==
| = All-Star |
| = AAFC MVP |

| Round | Pick # | AAFC team | Player | Position | College |
|---|---|---|---|---|---|
| 1 | 1 | Chicago Rockets | Tony Minisi | B | Pennsylvania |
| 1 | 2 | Baltimore Colts | Bobby Layne | QB | Texas |
| 1 | 3 | Brooklyn Dodgers | Harry Gilmer | QB | Alabama |
| 1 | 4 | Los Angeles Dons | Vaughn Mancha | C | Alabama |
| 1 | 5 | San Francisco 49ers | Joe Scott | B | San Francisco |
| 1 | 6 | Buffalo Bills | Clyde Scott | B | Arkansas |
| 1 | 7 | New York Yankees | Lowell Tew | B | Alabama |
| 1 | 8 | Cleveland Browns | Jeff Durkota | B | Penn State |
| 2 | 9 | Chicago Rockets | Carl Samuelson | T | Nebraska |
| 2 | 10 | Baltimore Colts | Bill Garrett | T | Mississippi State |
| 3 | 11 | Chicago Rockets | John Nolan | T | Penn State |
| 3 | 12 | Baltimore Colts | Earl Cook | G | SMU |
| 3 | 13 | Brooklyn Dodgers | Dan Edwards | E | Georgia |
| 3 | 14 | Los Angeles Dons | Len Ford | E | Michigan |
| 3 | 15 | San Francisco 49ers | Jim Cason | B | LSU |
| 3 | 16 | Buffalo Bills | Bill Gompers | B | Notre Dame |
| 3 | 17 | New York Yankees | Otto Schnellbacher | E | Kansas |
| 3 | 18 | Cleveland Browns | Ollie Cline | B | Ohio State |
| 4 | 19 | Chicago Rockets | Paul Cleary | E | USC |
| 4 | 20 | Baltimore Colts | Dan Sandifer | B | LSU |
| 4 | 21 | Brooklyn Dodgers | Joe Spencer | T | Oklahoma A&M |
| 4 | 22 | Los Angeles Dons | John Novitsky | T | Oklahoma City |
| 4 | 23 | San Francisco 49ers | Walt McCormick | C | USC |
| 4 | 24 | Buffalo Bills | Bill O'Connor | E | Notre Dame |
| 5 | 25 | Chicago Rockets | Bill Walsh | C | Notre Dame |
| 5 | 26 | Baltimore Colts | Joe Smith | E | Texas Tech |
| 5 | 27 | Brooklyn Dodgers | Les Bingaman | T | Illinois |
| 6 | 28 | Chicago Rockets | Vince DiFrancesca | G | Northwestern |
| 6 | 29 | Baltimore Colts | Gene Ruszkowski | T | Ohio |
| 6 | 30 | Brooklyn Dodgers | Jay Smith | E | Mississippi Southern |
| 6 | 31 | Los Angeles Dons | Lin Sexton | B | Wichita |
| 6 | 32 | San Francisco 49ers | Fred Land | T | LSU |
| 6 | 33 | Buffalo Bills | Marty Wendell | G | Notre Dame |
| 7 | 34 | Chicago Rockets | Jay Rhodemyre | C | Kentucky |
| 7 | 35 | Baltimore Colts | Jim Batchelor | B | East Texas State |
| 7 | 36 | Brooklyn Dodgers | Homer Paine | T | Oklahoma |
| 7 | 37 | Los Angeles Dons | Weldon Edwards | T | TCU |
| 7 | 38 | San Francisco 49ers | Phil O'Reilly | T | Purdue |
| 7 | 39 | Buffalo Bills | Bob Brugge | B | Ohio State |
| 7 | 40 | New York Yankees | Pete Stout | B | TCU |
| 7 | 41 | Cleveland Browns | Tommy Thompson | C | William & Mary |
| 8 | 42 | Chicago Rockets | Jim Turner | T | California |
| 8 | 43 | Baltimore Colts | Rex Olsen | B | BYU |
| 8 | 44 | Brooklyn Dodgers | Bruce Gehrke | E | Columbia |
| 8 | 45 | Los Angeles Dons | Jim Spavital | B | Oklahoma A&M |
| 9 | 46 | Chicago Rockets | Myron Miller | C | Oklahoma A&M |
| 9 | 47 | Baltimore Colts | Aubrey Fowler | B | Arkansas |
| 9 | 48 | Brooklyn Dodgers | Jim Minor | T | Arkansas |
| 9 | 49 | Los Angeles Dons | Knox Ramsey | G | William & Mary |
| 9 | 50 | San Francisco 49ers | Bill Luongo | B | Pennsylvania |
| 9 | 51 | Buffalo Bills | Lou King | B | Iowa |
| 9 | 52 | New York Yankees | Barney Poole | E | Ole Miss |
| 9 | 53 | Cleveland Browns | Bill Smith | T | North Carolina |
| 10 | 54 | Chicago Rockets | Phil Slosburg | B | Temple |
| 10 | 55 | Baltimore Colts | Jack Fitch | B | North Carolina |
| 10 | 56 | Brooklyn Dodgers | Herb St. John | G | Georgia |
| 10 | 57 | Los Angeles Dons | Chi Mills | G | VMI |
| 11 | 58 | Chicago Rockets | Jack Swaner | B | California |
| 11 | 59 | Baltimore Colts | Don Ettinger | T | Kansas |
| 11 | 60 | Brooklyn Dodgers | Chuck Newman | E | Louisiana Tech |
| 11 | 61 | Los Angeles Dons | Lou Mihajlovich | E | Indiana |
| 11 | 62 | San Francisco 49ers | Bob Steckroth | E | William & Mary |
| 11 | 63 | Buffalo Bills | John Finney | B | San Francisco |
| 11 | 64 | New York Yankees | Jack Weisenburger | B | Michigan |
| 11 | 65 | Cleveland Browns | Ralph Maughan | C | Utah State |
| 12 | 66 | Chicago Rockets | Thurman Gay | T | Oklahoma A&M |
| 12 | 67 | Baltimore Colts | Paul Redfield | T | Colgate |
| 12 | 68 | Brooklyn Dodgers | Jim Camp | B | North Carolina |
| 12 | 69 | Los Angeles Dons | Harper Davis | B | Mississippi State |
| 12 | 70 | San Francisco 49ers | Gene Malinowski | C | Detroit |
| 12 | 71 | Buffalo Bills | Dick Johnson | G | Baylor |
| 12 | 72 | New York Yankees | Bob Hendren | T | USC |
| 12 | 73 | Cleveland Browns | Dean Sensanbaugher | B | Ohio State |
| 13 | 74 | Chicago Rockets | Fran Parker | T | Holy Cross |
| 13 | 75 | Baltimore Colts | Stan Magdziak | B | William & Mary |
| 13 | 76 | Brooklyn Dodgers | Bob Koch | B | Oregon |
| 13 | 77 | Los Angeles Dons | Mike Graham | B | Cincinnati |
| 13 | 78 | San Francisco 49ers | Len Modzelski | T | Scranton |
| 13 | 79 | Buffalo Bills | George Grimes | B | Virginia |
| 13 | 80 | New York Yankees | Dick Ottele | B | Washington |
| 13 | 81 | Cleveland Browns | Mike Rubish | E | North Carolina |
| 14 | 82 | Chicago Rockets | Lou Agase | T | Illinois |
| 14 | 83 | Baltimore Colts | Dick Deranek | B | Indiana |
| 14 | 84 | Brooklyn Dodgers | John White | C | Michigan |
| 14 | 85 | Los Angeles Dons | Bernie Winkler | T | Texas Tech |
| 14 | 86 | San Francisco 49ers | Les Rideout | T | Bowling Green |
| 14 | 87 | Buffalo Bills | Larry Joe | B | Penn State |
| 14 | 88 | New York Yankees | Dick McKissack | B | SMU |
| 14 | 89 | Cleveland Browns | Alex Sarkisian | C | Northwestern |
| 15 | 90 | Chicago Rockets | Jerry McCarthy | E | Pennsylvania |
| 15 | 91 | Baltimore Colts | Dyke Norman | B | Washington & Lee |
| 15 | 92 | Brooklyn Dodgers | Bob Terry | T | Texas A&I |
| 15 | 93 | Los Angeles Dons | Bill Erickson | T | Ole Miss |
| 15 | 94 | San Francisco 49ers | Larry Olsonoski | T | Minnesota |
| 15 | 95 | Buffalo Bills | Frank Ballard | G | Virginia Tech |
| 15 | 96 | New York Yankees | Joe Magliolo | B | Texas |
| 15 | 97 | Cleveland Browns | Dan Dworsky | B | Michigan |
| 16 | 98 | Chicago Rockets | Rudy Krall | B | New Mexico |
| 16 | 99 | Baltimore Colts | Dick Working | B | Washington & Lee |
| 16 | 100 | Brooklyn Dodgers | John Wozniak | G | Alabama |
| 16 | 101 | Los Angeles Dons | Shorty McWilliams | B | Mississippi State |
| 16 | 102 | San Francisco 49ers | Wally Matulich | B | Mississippi State |
| 16 | 103 | Buffalo Bills | Jim Walthall | B | West Virginia |
| 16 | 104 | New York Yankees | Bob Ramsey | B | SMU |
| 16 | 105 | Cleveland Browns | Scott Beasley | E | Nevada |
| 17 | 106 | Chicago Rockets | Dick Flanagan | B | Ohio State |
| 17 | 107 | Baltimore Colts | George Sparger | C | North Carolina |
| 17 | 108 | Brooklyn Dodgers | Bob Jensen | E | Iowa State |
| 17 | 109 | Los Angeles Dons | Bob Levenhagen | G | Washington |
| 17 | 110 | San Francisco 49ers | Bob Ravensberg | E | Indiana |
| 17 | 111 | Buffalo Bills | Ray Coates | B | LSU |
| 17 | 112 | New York Yankees | Charlie Wright | E | Texas A&M |
| 17 | 113 | Cleveland Browns | Russ Steger | B | Illinois |
| 18 | 114 | Chicago Rockets | Ed Ryan | E | St. Mary's (CA) |
| 18 | 115 | Baltimore Colts | Rollin Prather | E | Kansas State |
| 18 | 116 | Brooklyn Dodgers | Joe Jurich | E | West Chester |
| 18 | 117 | Los Angeles Dons | Weyman Sellers | E | Georgia |
| 18 | 118 | San Francisco 49ers | Bill Pritula | T | Michigan |
| 18 | 119 | Buffalo Bills | Doug Waybright | E | Notre Dame |
| 18 | 120 | New York Yankees | Marion Shirley | T | Oklahoma City |
| 18 | 121 | Cleveland Browns | Lou Hoitsma | E | William & Mary |
| 19 | 122 | Chicago Rockets | Byron Gillory | B | Texas |
| 19 | 123 | Baltimore Colts | Norm Mosley | B | Alabama |
| 19 | 124 | Brooklyn Dodgers | Billie Cromer | B | North Texas State |
| 19 | 125 | Los Angeles Dons | Ab Wimberly | E | LSU |
| 19 | 126 | San Francisco 49ers | Art Fitzgerald | B | Yale |
| 19 | 127 | Buffalo Bills | Wade Walker | T | Oklahoma |
| 19 | 128 | New York Yankees | Tom Landry | B | Texas |
| 19 | 129 | Cleveland Browns | Pete Ashbaugh | B | Notre Dame |
| 20 | 130 | Chicago Rockets | Don Doll | B | USC |
| 20 | 131 | Baltimore Colts | Carmen Ragonese | B | New Hampshire |
| 20 | 132 | Brooklyn Dodgers | Dick Scott | C | Navy |
| 20 | 133 | Los Angeles Dons | Frank Ziegler | B | Georgia Tech |
| 20 | 134 | San Francisco 49ers | Pete Barbolak | T | Purdue |
| 20 | 135 | Buffalo Bills | Roger Stephens | B | Cincinnati |
| 20 | 136 | New York Yankees | Bobby Forbes | B | Florida |
| 20 | 137 | Cleveland Browns | Dave Templeton | G | Ohio State |
| 21 | 138 | Chicago Rockets | Fred Provo | B | Washington |
| 21 | 139 | Baltimore Colts | Bob Walker | B | Colorado Mines |
| 21 | 140 | Brooklyn Dodgers | Walt Marusa | G | Delaware |
| 21 | 141 | Los Angeles Dons | Ed Smith | B | Texas Mines |
| 21 | 142 | San Francisco 49ers | Dick Loepfe | T | Wisconsin |
| 21 | 143 | Buffalo Bills | Howard Duncan | C | Ohio State |
| 21 | 144 | New York Yankees | Carl Russ | B | Rice |
| 21 | 145 | Cleveland Browns | Dwight Eddleman | B | Illinois |
| 22 | 146 | Chicago Rockets | Phil Tinsley | E | UCLA |
| 22 | 147 | Baltimore Colts | Ray Borneman | B | Texas |
| 22 | 148 | Brooklyn Dodgers | Knute Dobkins | E | Butler |
| 22 | 149 | Los Angeles Dons | Paul Mortellaro | G | Florida |
| 22 | 150 | San Francisco 49ers | Bob Heck | E | Purdue |
| 22 | 151 | Buffalo Bills | Ralph Sazio | T | William & Mary |
| 22 | 152 | New York Yankees | Fred Enke | B | Arizona |
| 22 | 153 | Cleveland Browns | Lu Gambino | B | Maryland |
| 23 | 154 | Chicago Rockets | Glen Treichler | B | Colgate |
| 23 | 155 | Baltimore Colts | Al Tillman | C | Oklahoma |
| 23 | 156 | Brooklyn Dodgers | Fred Westphal | E | Cornell |
| 23 | 157 | Los Angeles Dons | Ted Kenfield | B | California |
| 23 | 158 | San Francisco 49ers | Floyd Lawhorn | G | Texas Tech |
| 23 | 159 | Buffalo Bills | George Blomquist | E | NC State |
| 23 | 160 | New York Yankees | John Cunningham | E | California |
| 23 | 161 | Cleveland Browns | Jim McDowell | G | William & Mary |
| 24 | 162 | Chicago Rockets | Ike Owens | E | Illinois |
| 24 | 163 | Baltimore Colts | Bob Pfohl | B | Purdue |
| 24 | 164 | Brooklyn Dodgers | Merle Dinkins | E | Oklahoma |
| 24 | 165 | Los Angeles Dons | Buddy Mulligan | B | Duke |
| 24 | 166 | San Francisco 49ers | Goble Bryant | T | Army |
| 24 | 167 | Buffalo Bills | J.D. Cheek | T | Oklahoma A&M |
| 24 | 168 | New York Yankees | Nick Ognovich | B | Wake Forest |
| 24 | 169 | Cleveland Browns | Haywood Fowle | T | North Carolina |
| 25 | 170 | Chicago Rockets | Ron Sockolov | T | California |
| 25 | 171 | Baltimore Colts | Lou Levanti | C | Illinois |
| 25 | 172 | Brooklyn Dodgers | Walt Pupa | B | North Carolina |
| 25 | 173 | Los Angeles Dons | George Lambert | T | Ole Miss |
| 25 | 174 | San Francisco 49ers | Bill Talarico | B | Pennsylvania |
| 25 | 175 | Buffalo Bills | Bob Rennebohm | E | Wisconsin |
| 25 | 176 | New York Yankees | Mike Zeleznak | B | Kansas State |
| 25 | 177 | Cleveland Browns | Ara Parseghian | B | Miami (OH) |
| 26 | 178 | Chicago Rockets | Gene Corum | G | West Virginia |
| 26 | 179 | Baltimore Colts | Sam Zatkoff | E | Illinois |
| 26 | 180 | Brooklyn Dodgers | Ray Richeson | G | Alabama |
| 26 | 181 | Los Angeles Dons | Jim Still | QB | Georgia Tech |
| 26 | 182 | San Francisco 49ers | Ed Marshall | T | Pennsylvania |
| 26 | 183 | Buffalo Bills | Ted Andrus | G | Southwestern Louisiana |
| 26 | 184 | New York Yankees | John Panelli | B | Notre Dame |
| 26 | 185 | Cleveland Browns | Tod Saylor | E | Lafayette |
| 27 | 186 | Chicago Rockets | John Daniels | C | UC Santa Barbara |
| 27 | 187 | Baltimore Colts | Harry Jagade | B | Indiana |
| 27 | 188 | Brooklyn Dodgers | Ott Hurrle | C | Butler |
| 27 | 189 | Los Angeles Dons | Charley Tatom | G | Texas |
| 27 | 190 | San Francisco 49ers | Perry Moss | B | Illinois |
| 27 | 191 | Buffalo Bills | Ray Brown | B | Virginia |
| 27 | 192 | New York Yankees | Jug Girard | B | Wisconsin |
| 27 | 193 | Cleveland Browns | Harry Caughron | T | William & Mary |
| 28 | 194 | Chicago Rockets | Al Hoisch | B | UCLA |
| 28 | 195 | Baltimore Colts | Ben Bendrick | B | Wisconsin |
| 28 | 196 | Brooklyn Dodgers | Warren Lowans | T | West Chester |
| 28 | 197 | Los Angeles Dons | Lou Creekmur | T | William & Mary |
| 28 | 198 | San Francisco 49ers | Bill Bell | QB | Muhlenberg |
| 28 | 199 | Buffalo Bills | Lou Corriere | B | Buffalo |
| 28 | 200 | New York Yankees | Rip Collins | B | LSU |
| 28 | 201 | Cleveland Browns | Pete Lanzi | E | Youngstown State |
| 29 | 202 | Chicago Rockets | Dick Wedel | G | Wake Forest |
| 29 | 203 | Baltimore Colts | Rex Grossman Sr. | B | Indiana |
| 29 | 204 | Brooklyn Dodgers | Art Littleton | E | Pennsylvania |
| 29 | 205 | Los Angeles Dons | Leon McLaughlin | C | UCLA |
| 29 | 206 | San Francisco 49ers | Herb Siegert | G | Illinois |
| 29 | 207 | Buffalo Bills | Johnny Wolosky | C | Penn State |
| 29 | 208 | New York Yankees | Frank Nelson | B | Utah |
| 29 | 209 | Cleveland Browns | George Roman | T | Case Western Reserve |
| 30 | 210 | Chicago Rockets | Tom Finical | E | Princeton |
| 30 | 211 | Baltimore Colts | Dick Reinking | E | SMU |
| 30 | 212 | Brooklyn Dodgers | Clarence McGeary | T | North Dakota State |
| 30 | 213 | Los Angeles Dons | Gus Kitchens | T | Tulsa |
| 30 | 214 | San Francisco 49ers | Frank Williams | B | Utah State |
| 30 | 215 | Buffalo Bills | Tally Stevens | E | Utah |
| 30 | 216 | New York Yankees | Bill Clements | E | UCLA |
| 30 | 217 | Cleveland Browns | Mel Sheehan | E | Missouri |
