= Mike Falls =

American football player (born 1934)

No. 57, 63
- Position: Guard

Personal information
- Born: March 3, 1934 (age 92); Bemidji, Minnesota, U.S.
- Listed height: 6 ft 2 in (1.88 m)
- Listed weight: 240 lb (109 kg)

Career information
- High school: Bemidji
- College: Minnesota
- NFL draft: 1956: 20th round, 237th overall pick

Career history
- New York Giants (1956)*; Toronto Argonauts (1956); New York Giants (1959)*; Green Bay Packers (1960)*; Dallas Cowboys (1960–1961)
- * Offseason or practice squad member only

Career NFL statistics
- Games played: 25
- Games started: 19
- Fumble recoveries: 1
- Stats at Pro Football Reference

Michael Lee Falls (born March 3, 1934) is an American former professional football player who was a guard in the National Football League (NFL) for the Dallas Cowboys. He played college football for the Minnesota Golden Gophers.

== Early life ==
Falls attended Bemidji High School where he lettered in football and track. In 1952, he won the Region 8 shot put championship.

He accepted a football scholarship from the University of Minnesota. He was a three-year starter, beginning his career as a two-way guard. As a junior, he was moved to tackle. As a senior, he was elected team captain. He also served as the team's placekicker. He played in the 1955 Blue–Gray game.

== Professional career ==
=== New York Giants ===
Falls was selected by the New York Giants in the twentieth round (237th overall) of the 1956 NFL draft, but didn't sign with the team.

=== Toronto Argonauts ===
On February 24, 1956, he signed with the Toronto Argonauts of the Interprovincial Rugby Football Union league, which eventually became the Canadian Football League. He played on the offensive line and was also the squad's placekicker. He was cut in October.

=== New York Giants ===
In 1959, he was signed as a free agent by the New York Giants. He was released on September 14.

=== Green Bay Packers ===
On March 10, 1960, he was signed as a free agent by the Green Bay Packers. He was released on September 19.

=== Dallas Cowboys ===
On September 22, 1960, he was claimed off waivers by the Dallas Cowboys. He won the right guard job by mid-season and started 5 games during the franchise's inaugural year. In 1961, he started all 14 games at right guard. He announced his retirement in 1963.

== Personal life ==
After football he initially worked in a public relations job, before being an Episcopal priest for thirty-six years. He was also a teaching associate of John Bradshaw. He was the Chaplain at Austin Recovery, a drug detox in Austin, Texas.
