= 1947 All-Eastern football team =

American all-star college football team

The 1947 All-Eastern football team consists of American football players chosen by various selectors as the best players at each position among the Eastern colleges and universities during the 1947 college football season.

== All-Eastern selections ==
=== Backs ===
- Frank R. Burns, Rutgers (AP-1, INS-1 [qb])
- Skip Minisi, Penn (AP-1, INS-1 [hb])
- Elwyn Rowan, Army (AP-1, INS-1 [fb])
- Gene Rossides, Columbia (AP-1)
- Ferd Nadherny, Yale (AP-2, INS-1 [hb])
- Jeff Durkota, Penn State (AP-2)
- Norman Dawson, Cornell (AP-2)
- Thomas Gannon, Harvard (AP-2)

=== Ends ===
- Bill Swiacki, Columbia (AP-1, INS-1)
- Bill Iannicelli, Franklin & Marshall (AP-1)
- Sam Tamburo, Penn State (INS-1)
- Dale Armstrong, Dartmouth (AP-2)
- Tom Finical, Princeton (AP-2)

=== Tackles ===
- Richard E. Shimshak, Navy (AP-1, INS-1)
- Bill Lilienthal, Villanova (AP-1)
- George Savitsky, Penn (INS-1)
- Ernie Stautner, Boston College (AP-2)
- Edmund Kulakowski, West Virginia (AP-2)

=== Guards ===
- Steve Suhey, Penn State (AP-1, INS-1)
- Joe Steffy, Army (AP-1, INS-1)
- Ben Coren, West Chester (AP-2)
- Norman Iacuele, Brown (AP-2)

=== Centers ===
- Chuck Bednarik, Penn (AP-1, INS-1)
- Dick Scott, Navy (AP-2)

== Key ==
- AP = Associated Press
- INS = International News Service

== See also ==
- 1947 College Football All-America Team
