= Chuck Bednarik =

Slovak-American football player (1925–2015)

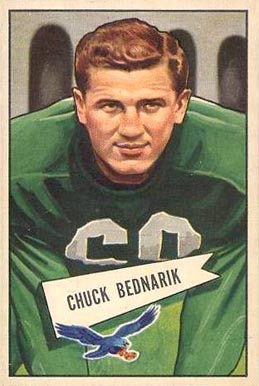
- Bednarik c. 1952

No. 60
- Positions: Linebacker, center

Personal information
- Born: May 1, 1925; Bethlehem, Pennsylvania, U.S.
- Died: March 21, 2015 (aged 89); Coopersburg, Pennsylvania, U.S.
- Listed height: 6 ft 3 in (1.91 m)
- Listed weight: 233 lb (106 kg)

Career information
- High school: Liberty (Bethlehem)
- College: Penn (1945–1948)
- NFL draft: 1949: 1st round, 1st overall pick

Career history
- Philadelphia Eagles (1949–1962)

Awards and highlights
- 2× NFL champion (1949, 1960); 10× First-team All-Pro (1950–1957, 1960, 1961); 8× Pro Bowl (1950–1954, 1956, 1957, 1960); NFL 1950s All-Decade Team; NFL 50th Anniversary All-Time Team; NFL 75th Anniversary All-Time Team; NFL 100th Anniversary All-Time Team; Philadelphia Eagles Hall of Fame; Philadelphia Eagles 75th Anniversary Team; Philadelphia Eagles No. 60 retired; Maxwell Award (1948); Unanimous All-American (1948); Consensus All-American (1947); Second-team All-American (1946); 3× First-team All-Eastern (1946, 1947, 1948); First-team AP All-Time All-American (2025)

Career NFL statistics
- Games played: 169
- Games started: 166
- Interceptions: 20
- Interception yards: 268
- Fumble recoveries: 21
- Defensive touchdowns: 1
- Military career
- Allegiance: United States
- Branch: U.S. Army Air Forces
- Service years: 1942–1946
- Rank: Staff Sergeant
- Unit: Eighth Air Force
- Conflicts: World War II
Signature
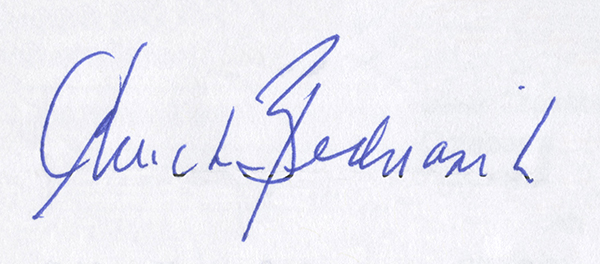
- Stats at Pro Football Reference
- Pro Football Hall of Fame
- College Football Hall of Fame

Charles Philip Bednarik, Jr. (May 1, 1925 – March 21, 2015), nicknamed "Concrete Charlie", was an American professional football linebacker and center who played in the National Football League (NFL). He played college football for the Penn Quakers, and was selected with the first overall pick of the 1949 NFL draft by the Philadelphia Eagles, where he played his entire 14-year NFL career from 1949 through 1962. Bednarik is ranked one of the hardest hitting tacklers in NFL history, and was one of the league's last two-way players.

On November 20, 1960, Bednarik knocked New York Giants star halfback Frank Gifford unconscious with a tackle that was called "professional football's most notorious concussion". Bednarik's career-altering tackle of the Giants' star is remembered in football lore as "The Hit".

Bednarik was inducted into the Pro Football Hall of Fame in 1967, his first year of eligibility, and the College Football Hall of Fame in 1969. He was named to the NFL 50th Anniversary All Time Team, the NFL 75th Anniversary All Time Two Way Team, and the NFL 100th Anniversary All Time Team.

== Early life and education ==
Bednarik was born in Bethlehem, Pennsylvania, on May 1, 1925, to Charles Albert Bednarik and Mary A. (Pivovarnicek) Bednarik. Five years earlier, his parents had emigrated from Široké, a village in eastern Slovakia near Prešov, and settled in Bethlehem, where his father worked for Bethlehem Steel. His father never learned to read or write English and so could not advance to foreman. He first attended school at SS. Cyril & Methodius, a Slovak parochial school in Bethlehem taught in Slovak.

He attended Bethlehem Catholic and later Liberty High School in Bethlehem, where he played football. In later life, Bednarik visited Slovakia three or four times. He went off to war before finishing high school, but was awarded a diploma and graduated in exchange for his service, an experience shared by football great Gino Marchetti.

=== Military service ===
Bednarik entered the United States Army Air Corps, where he served as a B-24 waist gunner with the Eighth Air Force. During World War II, Bednarik flew on 30 combat missions over Nazi Germany. He was awarded the Air Medal, four Oak Leaf Clusters, the European-African-Middle Eastern Campaign Medal, and four Battle Stars for his military service. His first mission was over Berlin on August 27, 1944, and last was over Zwiesel on April 20, 1945. After one mission, his flak-riddled plane crashed during a landing, and after skidding off the runway he had to kick out a window and jump 20 feet to the ground. He had the word MOTHER coming out of a blossoming flower tattooed on his forearm, so he could be identified if his plane was shot down.

=== College ===
Following World War II, in 1945, Bednarik entered the University of Pennsylvania in Philadelphia at 20 years old, where he was a 60-minute man, excelling as both center and linebacker, and sometimes as a punter for the Penn Quakers Football team. He married Emma Margetich in 1948. They first met at the Croatian Hall in Bethlehem.

At Penn, Bednarik was a two-time Consensus All-American in 1947 and 1948. Along with two of his teammates on the 1947 Penn team, George Savitsky (1991) and tailback Tony "Skip" Minisi (1985), and his coach, George Munger (1976), Bednarik was voted entry into the College Football Hall of Fame (1969). In 1948, Bednarik placed third in Heisman Trophy voting and won the Maxwell Award for outstanding college player that year. He was seventh-place for the Heisman in 1947 and second-team All-America in 1946. In 1969, he also was voted by a panel of sportswriters, coaches, and College Football Hall of Fame players as "the greatest center of all-time."

In 1999, Sports Illustrated included him on its All-Century Team for college football.

The Chuck Bednarik Award is awarded annually by the Maxwell Football Club to the best defensive player in college football.

== Professional career ==
Bednarik was the first player selected overall in the 1949 NFL draft, by the Philadelphia Eagles, where he went on to start on both offense as a center and on defense as a linebacker for the Eagles. He played 14 years for the Eagles (1949–1962). As a center, he proved to be a strong blocker and quick off the ball; and as a linebacker he was instinctive and could think like a coach.

Bednarik was a member of two Eagles' NFL Championship teams, in 1949 (a 14–0 win over the Los Angeles Rams) and again in 1960 (a 17–13 win over the Green Bay Packers). At 35 years old, in his twelfth season, he had been playing center, and had not been at middle linebacker for two years During the Eagles fifth game, left linebacker Bob Pellegrini suffered a broken leg and coach Buck Shaw asked Bednarik if he would step in at linebacker too, and Bednarik enthusiastically agreed; becoming a two-way player again.

Bednarik played 58 minutes in the 1960 NFL Championship Game. In the final play of that game, Bednarik was the last Eagles defensive player between the Green Bay Packers' Jim Taylor and the end zone. Bednarik tackled Taylor at the Eagles' eight-yard line, and remained atop Taylor as the final seconds ticked off the clock, ensuring the Packers could not run another play and preserving a 17–13 Eagles victory and the 1960 NFL championship. Once the clock ran out, Bednarik said, "'You can get up now, Jim, this game is over....'" The controversy surrounding this play led to the NFL putting in a rule penalizing defensive players for not allowing an offensive player to get up off the field.

Eagle quarterback Norm Van Brocklin was named the game's MVP. After the game, Bednarik told Eagles receiver Pete Retzlaff that he felt like Paul Revere's horse, "'The horse did all the work ... but Paul Revere got all the credit.'"

=== Gifford hit ===
On November 20, 1960, in a game between the Eagles and New York Giants at the original Yankee Stadium, Bednarik knocked Giants running back Frank Gifford out of football for over 18 months in one of the most famed tackles in NFL history, often referred to simply as The Hit. Bednarik's clothesline tackle of Gifford dropped Gifford immediately to the ground, and Gifford immediately went unconscious. Gifford was transported from the field on a stretcher and then to a local hospital, where he was diagnosed with a deep concussion.

Bednarik was criticized after the game by Giants players and fans for apparently celebrating Gifford's injury. A Sports Illustrated photo of Bednarik standing over an unconscious Gifford became iconic, showing Bednarik in mid-celebration, right above Gifford as he lay unconscious on the field. Bednarik defended himself by saying that he was celebrating the fumble caused by the hit, which the Eagles recovered and clinched the victory for the Eagles, sending the team to 1960 NFL Championship Game. Years later, Gifford called the hit "a clean shot", and said, "Chuck hit me exactly the way I would have hit him." Gifford said, "'I didn't bear him any resentment and never have....'" The play has been called "one of the most iconic plays in NFL history."

=== Quarrel with Noll ===
Bednarik had a famous quarrel with future hall of fame coach Chuck Noll, who as a Cleveland Browns player, had smashed him in the face during a fourth-down punting play. A few years later, Bednarik punched Noll in an on-field confrontation after a game, which was being televised. NFL commissioner Bert Bell was upset about hurting the family-friendly image he wanted for the league, and subsequently fined Bednarik $500 and ordered him to apologize to Noll for the punch. According to Bednarik, when he gave the apology, Noll simply responded, "Bullshit."

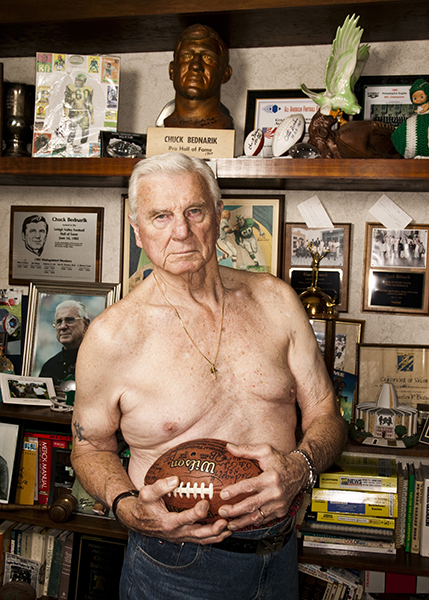
Bednarik in 2004

=== Accomplishments and legacy ===
Bednarik was elected to the Pro Football Hall of Fame in 1967, and was named to the NFL 50th Anniversary All Time Team as the center, the NFL 75th Anniversary All Time Two Way Team (center and linebacker), and the NFL 100th Anniversary All Time Team as a linebacker. He was named to the NFL All Decade Team for the 1950s as a center. He was selected All NFL nine times (as a center in 1950, and a linebacker in 1951–1957 and 1960), and played in eight Pro Bowls. The Eagles retired his number 60 in 1987. They named him to their 75th Anniversary Team in 2007, where they honored Bednarik as the best center and middle linebacker in team history, Bednarik later saying, "'On that day ... I felt like Benjamin Franklin.'" In 2021, The Athletic named him the 54th greatest player ever.

He was MVP of the 1954 Pro Bowl, taking back an interception for a touchdown, recovering three fumbles, and even punting when the punter got injured.

He proved extremely durable, playing in 169 of 172 games in his 14 seasons with the Philadelphia Eagles, and two of his only three games missed were at the beginning of his rookie year. He spoke with coach Earle "Greasy" Neale after those games and asked to be traded if we was not going to play. He became a starter, playing linebacker and center, after that. He was the last of the NFL's "Sixty-Minute Men", players who played both offense and defense on a regular basis. Neale would give the induction speech for Bednarik when he joined the hall of fame.

Bednarik's nickname, "Concrete Charlie," originated from his off-season career as a concrete salesman for the Warner Company, not from his reputation as a ferocious tackler. Sportswriter Hugh Brown of The Evening Bulletin in Philadelphia, credited with bestowing Bednarik with the nickname, remarked that Bednarik "is as hard as the concrete he sells."

Bednarik served as an analyst on the HBO program Inside The NFL for its inaugural season in 1977–78. The show was based in Philadelphia at its debut, with Bednarik and "Big" Al Meltzer as the hosts.

In 2021, The Athletic ranked the top 100 NFL players of all time, with Bednarik at 54. In 1999, he also was ranked number 54 on The Sporting News' list of the 100 Greatest Football Players, making him the highest-ranking player to have spent his entire career with the Eagles, the highest-ranking offensive center, and the eighth-ranked linebacker in all of professional football.

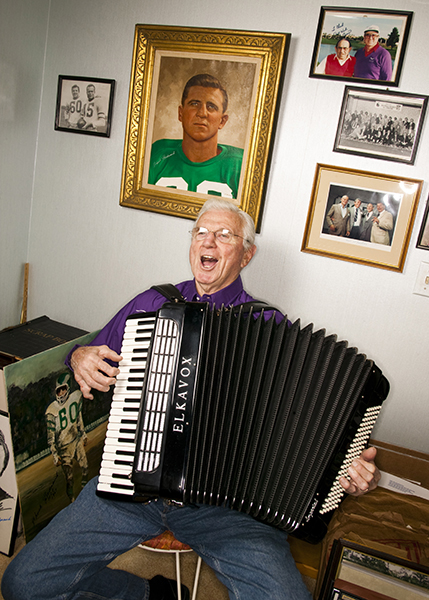
Bednarik in 2004

In 2010, Bednarik was ranked 35th on the NFL Network's "The Top 100: NFL's Greatest Players". Ranked one spot ahead of Bednarik at #34 was Deion Sanders, a player for whom Bednarik had held open contempt in regards to being a two-way player.

General manager Ernie Accorsi called Bednarik "'the John Wayne of football.'"

== NFL career statistics ==
Legend
	Won the NFL championship
	Led the league
**Bold**	Career high
Underline	Incomplete data

=== Regular season ===
Year	Team	Games		Interceptions					Fumbles			
Year	Team	GP	GS	Int	Yds	Y/I	Lng	TD	FR	Yds	Y/F	TD
1949	PHI	10	7	0	0	—	0	0	0	0	—	0
1950	PHI	12	12	1	9	9.0	9	0	1	0	0.0	0
1951	PHI	12	12	0	0	—	0	0	2	5	**2.5**	0
1952	PHI	12	12	2	14	7.0	12	0	1	0	0.0	0
1953	PHI	12	12	**6**	**116**	19.3	**41**	**1**	**4**	**6**	1.5	0
1954	PHI	12	12	1	9	9.0	9	0	**4**	0	0.0	0
1955	PHI	12	12	1	36	**36.0**	36	0	0	0	—	0
1956	PHI	12	12	2	0	0.0	0	0	2	4	2.0	0
1957	PHI	11	11	3	51	17.0	37	0	2	0	0.0	0
1958	PHI	12	12	0	0	—	0	0	1	0	0.0	0
1959	PHI	12	12	0	0	—	0	0	1	0	0.0	0
1960	PHI	12	12	2	0	0.0	0	0	2	0	0.0	0
1961	PHI	**14**	**14**	2	33	16.5	33	0	0	0	—	0
1962	PHI	**14**	**14**	0	0	—	0	0	1	0	0.0	0
Career		169	166	20	268	13.4	41	1	21	15	0.7	0

=== Postseason ===
Year	Team	Games	
Year	Team	GP	GS
1949	PHI	1	0
1960	PHI	1	**1**
Career		2	1

== Opinions on current NFL players ==
He even criticized Troy Brown of the New England Patriots and Deion Sanders of the Dallas Cowboys, two players who also have played both offense and defense. Bednarik noted that Brown and Sanders saw time at both wide receiver and cornerback, positions that did not require as much contact as he endured while playing both center and linebacker. He also believed a true two-way player had to play every down.

=== Relationship with the Eagles ===
Bednarik's former Eagles number, 60, has been retired by the Eagles in honor of his achievements with the team and is one of only nine numbers retired in the history of the franchise.

Bednarik quarreled with current Eagles owner Jeffrey Lurie in 1996. Lurie declined to buy 100 copies of Bednarik's new book for $15 each for the entire team, as that was against NFL rules, and that grudge carried over into the Eagles' Super Bowl appearance in 2005, when he openly rooted against his former team. He later resolved his differences with Lurie. He was a consistent critic of several league issues, including his pension, today's salaries, and one-way players.

During Eagles training camp in the summer of 2006, Bednarik and the Eagles reconciled, seemingly ending the feud between Bednarik and Lurie. At the same time, however, Bednarik made disparaging remarks regarding Reggie White, leading to a somewhat lukewarm reception of the reconciliation by Eagles' fans. In the edition of August 4 of Allentown's Morning Call newspaper, however, it was reported that Bednarik apologized, stating he had been confused, and meant to make the statement about former Eagles wide receiver Terrell Owens.

== Later life and death ==
Bednarik was chairman of the Pennsylvania State Athletic Commission.

Bednarik died at 4:23 a.m. on March 21, 2015, in Coopersburg, Pennsylvania, after having fallen ill the previous day. He was 89. Although the Philadelphia Eagles released a statement saying he died after a "brief illness", Bednarik's eldest daughter, Charlene Thomas, disputed that claim, saying he had Alzheimer's disease and had been suffering from dementia for years and that football-related injuries played a role in his decline.

== See also ==
- Chuck Bednarik Award, awarded annually in Bednarik's honor to the best defensive player in college football
