= Suhey =

Suhey is a surname. Notable people with the name include:

- Matt Suhey (1958–2026), American football player
- Steve Suhey (1922–1977), American football player
