= 1948 All-Skyline Six Conference football team =

American college football team

The 1948 All-Skyline Six Conference football team consisted of American football players selected to the All-Skyline Six team selected by the Deseret News for the 1948 college football season.

== All Skyline selections ==
=== Ends ===
- Barney Hafen, Utah
- George Jones, Colorado A&M
- Tally Stevens, Utah

=== Tackles ===
- Thurman "Fum" McGraw, Colorado A&M
- Bernie Craig, Denver
- Kimball Merrill, BYU
- Moroni Schwab, Utah State

=== Guards ===
- Gordon Neff, Utah
- Don Mullison, Colorado A&M
- Lee Taylor, Denver
- Wally Nalder, Utah

=== Centers ===
- Ralph Olsen, Utah
- Joe Cribari, Denver

=== Quarterbacks ===
- Cannon Parkinson, Utah
- Gil Tobler, Utah

=== Halfbacks ===
- Jay Van Noy, Utah State
- Eddie Talboom, Wyoming
- Eddie Hanna, Colorado A&M

=== Fullbacks ===
- Andy Pavich, Denver
- Bob Summerhays, Utah

== See also ==
- 1948 College Football All-America Team
