= Thomas Gannon (American football) =

American football player and coach (1922–1997)

Biographical details
- Born: February 11, 1922; Westbury, New York, U.S.
- Died: October 19, 1997 (aged 75); Laurel, New York, U.S.

Playing career
- 1946–1948: Harvard
- Positions: Halfback, defensive back

Coaching career (HC unless noted)
- 1949–1951: American International

Head coaching record
- Overall: 12–11–1

Accomplishments and honors

Awards
- Second-team All-Eastern (1947)

Thomas H. "Chip" Gannon (February 11, 1922 – October 19, 1997) was an American college football player and coach. He was a halfback and defensive back at Harvard University, lettering from 1946 to 1948. Gannon served as the head football coach at American International University from 1949 to 1951. He was selected by the Los Angeles Dons of the All-America Football Conference in the 1949 AAFC Draft.

Gannon also lettered in basketball and baseball at Harvard. He died on October 19, 1997, at his home in Laurel, New York.

== Head coaching record ==
Year	Team	Overall	Conference	Standing	Bowl/playoffs
American International Yellow Jackets (Independent) (1949–1951)
1949	American International	3–4–1			
1950	American International	5–3			
1951	American International	4–4			
American International:		12–11–1			
Total:		12–11–1			
