= Bill Fischer (American football) =

American football player (1927–2017)

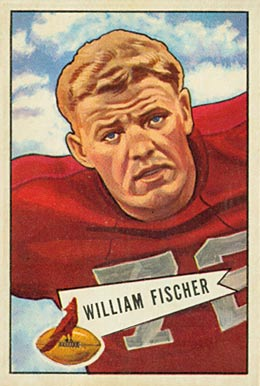
- Fischer on a 1952 Bowman football card

No. 72
- Positions: Tackle, guard, defensive tackle

Personal information
- Born: March 10, 1927; Chicago, Illinois, U.S.
- Died: January 20, 2017 (aged 89); Cape Coral, Florida, U.S.
- Listed height: 6 ft 2 in (1.88 m)
- Listed weight: 248 lb (112 kg)

Career information
- High school: Lane Tech (Chicago)
- College: Notre Dame (1945–1948)
- NFL draft: 1949: 1st round, 10th overall pick

Career history

Playing
- Chicago Cardinals (1949–1953)

Coaching
- Notre Dame (1954–1958) Assistant coach

Awards and highlights
- Second-team All-Pro (1952); 3× Pro Bowl (1950, 1951, 1952); 2× National champion (1946, 1947); Outland Trophy (1948); 2× Consensus All-American (1947, 1948)

Career NFL statistics
- Games played: 59
- Games started: 47
- Fumble recoveries: 10
- Stats at Pro Football Reference
- College Football Hall of Fame

William Anton "Moose" Fischer (March 10, 1927 – January 20, 2017) was an American professional football player who was a lineman for the Chicago Cardinals of the National Football League (NFL) from 1949 to 1953. He was a first-round pick by the Cardinals in the 1949 NFL draft. With the Cardinals, he was invited to three Pro Bowls.

Fischer played college football for the Notre Dame Fighting Irish, winning two national championships. He was twice named a consensus All-American in 1947 and 1948. He was the first Mr. Irrelevant to make the NFL Pro Bowl, as the last pick in the 1948 NFL draft; Fischer was selected by the Chicago Cardinals after his junior season with Notre Dame. He opted to stay in school, and won the Outland Trophy as the nation's top interior lineman in 1948. Chicago drafted him again in 1949, this time in the first round.

Fischer returned to Notre Dame after his playing career, serving as an assistant coach under Terry Brennan, from 1954 to 1958. He also served as president of the Notre Dame Monogram Club in 1982. In 1983, he was inducted into the National Football Foundation Hall of Fame. Fischer died on January 20, 2017, in Cape Coral, Florida.
