= Paul Cleary (American football) =

American football player (1922–1996)

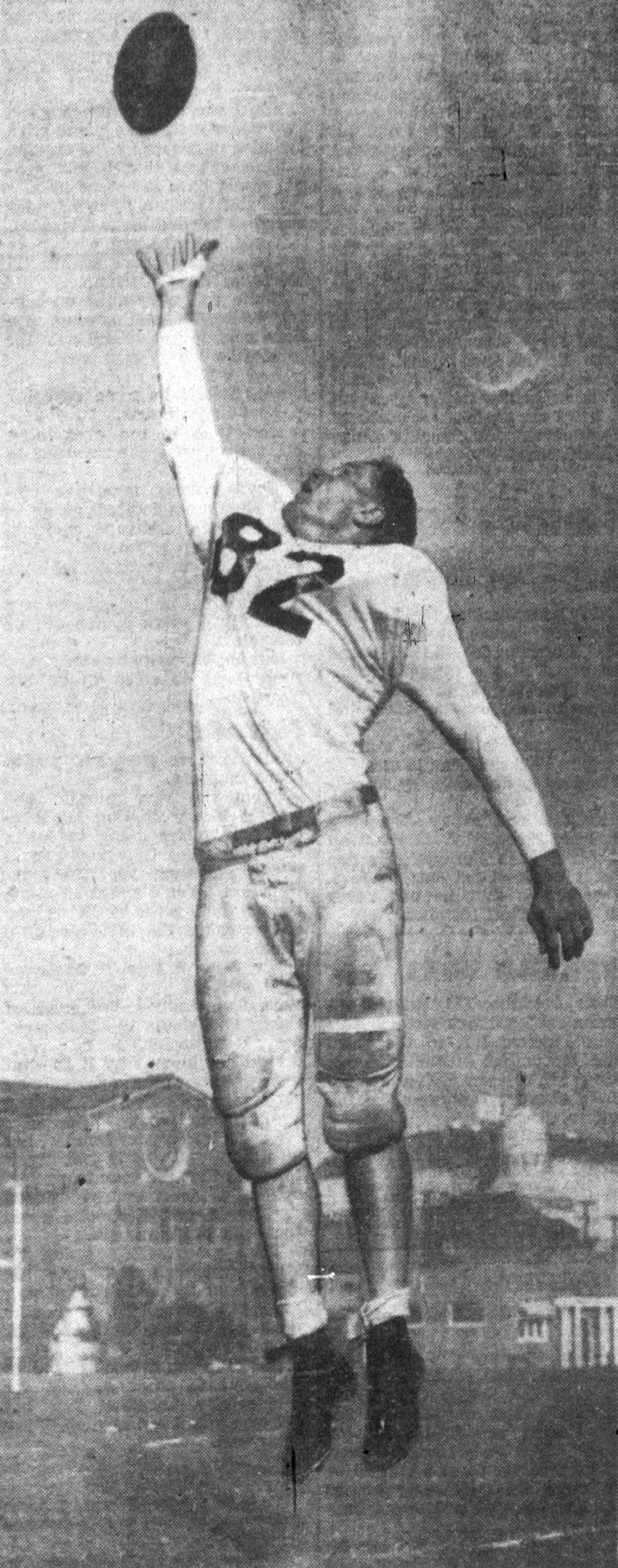
- Cleary, circa 1947

No. 57, 53
- Positions: End, defensive end

Personal information
- Born: February 7, 1922; North Loup, Nebraska, U.S.
- Died: January 8, 1996 (aged 73); Laguna Beach, California, U.S.
- Listed height: 6 ft 1 in (1.85 m)
- Listed weight: 197 lb (89 kg)

Career information
- High school: Santa Ana (CA)
- College: USC (1946-1947)
- NFL draft: 1948: 10th round, 77th overall pick

Career history
- New York Yankees (1948); Chicago Hornets (1949)

Awards and highlights
- Consensus All-American (1947); First-team All-PCC (1947)

Career AAFC statistics
- Receptions: 4
- Receiving yards: 37
- Stats at Pro Football Reference
- College Football Hall of Fame

Paul Hanson Cleary (February 7, 1922 – January 8, 1996) was a professional American football end in the All-America Football Conference (AAFC). A 10th round selection (77th overall pick) of the 1948 National Football League draft, he played two seasons for the AAFC's New York Yankees (1948) and Chicago Hornets (1949). He played college football for the University of Southern California Trojans (USC) after playing for Santa Ana College teams in 1941 and 1942.

== Military service ==
Cleary spent three years in the United States Army, serving in the Pacific Theater and in the Occupation of Japan, rising to the rank of first lieutenant.

== College career ==
He was discharged just in time to enroll at Southern California and join the football team in 1946. He was All-American in 1947. In 1973 the Los Angeles Times selected all-time Southern California teams, and Cleary was at end on the pre-1950 lineup.

He was elected to the College Football Hall of Fame in 1989.

== Post-college ==
Cleary was selected by the Chicago Rockets in the fourth round of the 1948 AAFC Draft. He later settled in South Laguna, California. He was with R.J. Noble Co., contractors, serving as president, then chairman of the board.
