= Clarence McGeary =

American football player (1926–1993)

No. 44, 50
- Position: Defensive tackle

Personal information
- Born: August 8, 1926; St. Paul, Minnesota, U.S.
- Died: April 6, 1993 (aged 66); Salt Lake City, Utah, U.S.
- Listed height: 6 ft 5 in (1.96 m)
- Listed weight: 250 lb (113 kg)

Career information
- High school: White Bear Lake (MN); Hastings (NE)
- College: Minnesota (1946); North Dakota State (1947–1949)
- NFL draft: 1948: 30th round, 281st overall pick

Career history
- Green Bay Packers (1950–1951); Montreal Alouettes (1951); Green Bay Packers (1955)*
- * Offseason or practice squad member only

Career NFL statistics
- Fumble recoveries: 1
- Stats at Pro Football Reference

Clarence Valentine McGeary Jr. (August 8, 1926 – April 6, 1993) was an American professional football player. A tackle, he played college football for the Minnesota Golden Gophers and North Dakota State Bison and was selected in the 30th round of the 1948 NFL draft by the Green Bay Packers. He later played with the Packers and the Montreal Alouettes.

== Early life ==
McGeary was born on August 8, 1926, in St. Paul, Minnesota. He began his football career in his hometown before attending White Bear Lake High School; he was their second alumni to make it to the NFL. He transferred to Hastings High School in Nebraska in 1942, but arrived too late to be eligible to play that season; he played for the football team as a tackle in 1943. McGeary then played as a forward for the Hastings basketball team and lettered with the track and field team. After graduating, he served close to two years in World War II with the United States Army Air Forces. Awarded a Purple Heart for his service, he was a staff sergeant and served 47 missions in China, India, Japan, Guam, Okinawa, Hawaii and Australia.

== College career ==
McGeary began playing for the Minnesota Golden Gophers in 1946 and as a freshman became the starting right tackle. He was the president of his freshman class. After one season there, he joined the North Dakota State Bison in 1947. He returned to the Bison in 1948 and played end before switching to center in 1949. He was an all-conference performer with the Bison, while working insurance in Fargo, North Dakota, in the off-season.

== Professional career ==
McGeary was selected in the 30th round (281st overall) of the 1948 NFL draft by the Green Bay Packers. He was also selected in the 30th round (212th overall) of the 1948 AAFC Draft, but chose to remain in college instead of immediately sign with a professional team. He signed with the Packers in July 1950. In his first season, he played all 12 games and was used as a first-string defensive tackle; he also saw time as a tackle on offense as a fill-in for injured players. He was released by the Packers on September 25, 1951.

Shortly after being released by the Packers, McGeary signed with the Montreal Alouettes Canadian football team. He appeared in seven games for the team at tackle, starting all of them, although he later noted that Canadian football "didn't compare with the NFL." He retired from football in 1952 and then served with the Bismarck, North Dakota, station KFYR-TV as an announcer; he also had a television program with them and was a play-by-play broadcaster for the Minnesota Golden Gophers football team. He stayed in shape by playing semi-professional basketball and attempted a comeback in June 1955 by re-signing with the Packers. He left the team in July 1955 after having a chest infection.

== Personal and later life ==
McGeary had a daughter while with the Packers, and he learned of her birth through an announcement by the public address announcer during one of his games. He had six children in total. He continued his broadcasting career after the end of his playing career and also became a professional wrestler during his football career. In order to supplement his income while playing, McGeary said that, in addition to wrestling, he also bet on Packers games each week. As a wrestler, he competed in around 1,500 matches and had a tag team with Bronko Nagurski, who was his favorite player growing up.

In 1959, he coached a football team known as the South Broward Volunteers in Florida. The following year he began operating bowling alleys with boxer Rocky Marciano. After selling his share of the bowling alleys to Marciano in the 1960s, McGeary became a founder of the Federation of Christian Athletes and worked in the marina business. He died on April 6, 1993, at the age of 66 in Salt Lake City, Utah.
