= Bemidji High School =

Location
- 2900 Division St W Bemidji, Minnesota 56601; United States; 47.46658°N 94.92223°W

Information
- Type: Public high school
- School district: Bemidji Area Schools
- Principal: Jason Stanoch
- Faculty: 210
- Teaching staff: 76.94 (FTE)
- Grades: 9-12
- Enrollment: 1,516 (2023–2024)
- Student to teacher ratio: 19:70
- Campus: Waterfront, suburban, 260 acres
- Campus size: 392,000 sq. ft
- Colors: Navy and white
- Mascot: Lumberjack
- Website: https://bhs.isd31.net/

Bemidji High School is a public high school in Bemidji, Minnesota, United States. The school is situated on a 260-acre (1.1 km^{2}) campus two miles (3 km) west of downtown Bemidji. The Mississippi River runs behind the high school. Constructed in 2000, Bemidji High School is the largest in northern Minnesota in terms of student enrollment.

The high school received fame when it was featured on Larry the Cable Guy's new show, Only in America with Larry the Cable Guy. The show emphasized the fact that BHS is the only high school in the world to offer a curling class.

BHS was named a Silver Medal School by the US News and ranked 29th out of 786 Minnesota high schools.

== Construction ==
Prompted by aging facilities and an increasing student population, the district hired an architect to examine the district’s facility needs and develop solutions. The result is a new 392,000-square-foot (36,400 m^{2}) high school on 260 heavily wooded acres bordered by the Mississippi River. The educational spaces are arranged in academic clusters, each featuring general-purpose classrooms, labs, spaces, a special project center and teacher planning centers. The project was officially completed in April 2001.

== Athletics ==
Bemidji High School's mascot is the Lumberjack. The school offers boys' and girls' soccer, swimming, basketball, Nordic skiing, hockey, golf, tennis, baseball, softball, dance line, cross country running, curling, cheerleading, wrestling, football, gymnastics, and track and field.

== School Day ==
Bemidji High School operates on a block schedule. Each weekday, students have five classes that are 75 minutes long. With this schedule, students can take more classes throughout the year.

== Academics ==
Bemidji High School offers over 200 different class options. BHS encompasses several Advanced Placement courses as well as Project Lead the Way courses in the school.

== Activities ==
Bemidji High School offers a variety of different activities:

- Art Club
- Environmental Club
- FIRST Robotics Competition Team
- GSA (Gay-Straight Alliance)
- FCA (Fellowship of Christian Athletes)
- Interact Club
- JROTC
- Knowledge Bowl
- Link Crew
- Math League
- Mock Trial
- Model UN
- National Honor Society
- Outdoor Adventure Club
- Science Olympiad
- Speech Team
- Student Congress
- Student Council
- Yearbook

== Arts ==
Bemidji High School is home to two show choir organizations, La Voce Ballo (Women's, grades 9-12) and, Vocalmotive (mixed, grades 9-12).

== Notable alumni ==
- Bronko Nagurski (1926), Hall of Fame NFL player
- Mike Falls (1952), former NFL player
- Gary Burger (1960), lead singer of The Monks
- Gary Sargent (1972), former NHL player
- Bill Israelson (1975), former PGA Tour golfer
- Bryan Hickerson (c. 1982), former MLB pitcher
- George Pelawa (1986), 1986 Minnesota Mr. Hockey
- Joe Motzko (1998), former NHL player
- Frank Mays (c. 2009), indoor professional football player
- Ber (musician), Indie pop musician
