= 1948 All-Big Nine Conference football team =

The 1948 All-Big Nine Conference football team consists of American football players selected to the All-Big Nine Conference teams selected by the Associated Press (AP), United Press (UP) and the International News Service (INS) for the 1948 Big Nine Conference football season. Players selected as first-team honorees by the AP, UP and INS are displayed in bold.

Michigan compiled a 9–0 record, won both the Big Nine Conference and national football championships, and had four players who were selected as consensus first-team All-Big Nine players. Michigan's consensus first-team honorees were quarterback Pete Elliott, end Dick Rifenburg, tackle Alvin Wistert, guard Dominic Tomasi.

Other players receiving first-team honors from at least two of the three major selectors were Indiana halfback George Taliaferro, Purdue halfback Harry Szulborski, Northwestern fullback Art Murakowski, Minnesota end Bud Grant, Minnesota guard Leo Nomellini, and Northwestern center Alex Sarkisian.

== All Big-Nine selections ==
=== Ends ===
- **Dick Rifenburg**, Michigan (AP-1, INS-1; UP-1)
- **Bud Grant**, Minnesota (AP-1, INS-1; UP-1)
- Bob McKenzie, Iowa (AP-2, UP-2)
- Walt Kersulis, Illinois (AP-2, UP-2)
- Charles Hagmann, Northwestern (INS-2)
- Tony Klimek, Illinois (INS-2)

=== Tackles ===
- **Alvin Wistert**, Michigan (AP-1, INS-1; UP-1)
- Bill Kay, Iowa (AP-1, INS-2; UP-1)
- Phil O'Reilly, Purdue (AP-2, INS-1, UP-2)
- John Goldsberry, Indiana (AP-2, UP-2)
- William S. "Steve" Sawle, Northwestern (INS-2)

=== Guards ===
- **Dominic Tomasi**, Michigan (AP-1, INS-1; UP-1)
- **Leo Nomellini**, Minnesota (AP-1, INS-1; UP-1)
- Dave Templeton, Ohio State (AP-2, INS-2, UP-2)
- Herb Siegert, Illinois (AP-2, INS-2, UP-2)

=== Centers ===
- **Alex Sarkisian**, Northwestern (AP-1, INS-1; UP-1)
- Clayton Tonnemaker, Minnesota (AP-2, UP-2)
- Bob Wilson, Wisconsin (INS-2)

=== Quarterbacks ===
- **Pete Elliott**, Michigan (AP-1, INS-1; UP-1)
- Don Burson, Northwestern (AP-2, UP-2)

=== Halfbacks ===
- **Harry Szulborski**, Purdue (AP-1, INS-1; UP-1)
- **George Taliaferro**, Indiana (AP-1, INS-1; UP-1)
- Frank Aschenbrenner, Northwestern (AP-2, INS-2, UP-2)
- Chuck Ortmann, Michigan (AP-2, INS-2, UP-2)
- Everett Faunce, Minnesota (INS-2)
- Al DiMarco, Iowa (INS-2)
- Dwight Eddleman, Illinois (INS-2)

=== Fullbacks ===
- **Art Murakowski**, Northwestern (AP-1, INS-1; UP-1)
- Joe Whisler, Ohio State (AP-2, INS-1, UP-2)

== Key ==
AP = Associated Press, chosen by conference coaches

UP = United Press

INS = International News Service

Bold = Consensus first-team selection by the AP, UP and INS

== See also ==
- 1948 College Football All-America Team
