= Tony Klimek =

American football player (1925–2012)

No. 53, 61
- Position: Defensive end

Personal information
- Born: November 24, 1925; Chicago, Illinois, U.S.
- Died: August 21, 2012 (aged 86); Chicago, Illinois, U.S.
- Listed height: 5 ft 11 in (1.80 m)
- Listed weight: 200 lb (91 kg)

Career information
- High school: Carl Schurz (Chicago)
- College: Illinois
- NFL draft: 1949: 14th round, 140th overall pick

Career history
- Chicago Cardinals (1951–1952)

Awards and highlights
- First-team All-Big Ten (1950); Second-team All-Big Nine (1948)

Career NFL statistics
- Interceptions: 5
- Fumble recoveries: 1
- Stats at Pro Football Reference

Tony Klimek (November 24, 1925 – August 21, 2012) was an American professional football defensive end. He was selected by the Chicago Cardinals in the 14th round (140th overall) of the 1949 NFL Draft. He played for the Chicago Cardinals from 1951 to 1952.

He died on August 21, 2012, in Chicago, Illinois at age 86.
