= Frank Mays =

American football player (born 1990)

No. 61, 97, 17
- Position: Defensive lineman

Personal information
- Born: December 1, 1990 (age 35); Bemidji, Minnesota
- Listed height: 6 ft 9 in (2.06 m)
- Listed weight: 291 lb (132 kg)

Career information
- High school: Bemidji (MN)
- College: Florida A&M
- NFL draft: 2014: undrafted

Career history
- Philadelphia Eagles (2014)*; Tampa Bay Storm (2015); Philadelphia Eagles (2015)*; Portland Steel (2016); Iowa Barnstormers (2017); Bloomington Edge (2018–2019)
- * Offseason or practice squad member only

Career AFL statistics
- Tackles: 5.5
- Sacks: 1
- Stats at ArenaFan.com
- Stats at Pro Football Reference

Frances Mays (born December 1, 1990) is an American football defensive lineman. He played college football at Florida A&M University and attended Bemidji High School in Bemidji, Minnesota. He was also a member of the Philadelphia Eagles, Tampa Bay Storm, Portland Steel, Iowa Barnstormers, and Bloomington Edge.

== Early life ==
Mays attended Bemidji High School, where he only began to play sports during his senior year when he decided to try out for the football team.

== College career ==
Mays played for the Central Lakes College Raiders from 2010 to 2011 where he was named honorable mention Division III All-American and the Florida A&M from 2012 to 2013.

== Professional career ==
Pre-draft measurables
Height	Weight	40-yard dash	10-yard split	20-yard split	20-yard shuttle	Three-cone drill	Vertical jump	Broad jump	Bench press
6 ft 9 in (2.06 m)	291 lb (132 kg)	4.85 s	1.72 s	2.84 s	4.89 s	7.99 s	21.5 in (0.55 m)	9 ft 9 in (2.97 m)	22 reps
All values from Florida A&M Pro Day

=== Philadelphia Eagles ===
In 2014, Mays signed as an undrafted free agent with the Philadelphia Eagles. On August 23, 2014, Mays was waived by the Eagles.

=== Tampa Bay Storm ===
Mays was assigned to the Tampa Bay Storm of the Arena Football League in April, 2015.

=== Return to Philadelphia ===
Mays re-signed with the Eagles on May 7, 2015. On August 10, 2015, Mays was waived.

=== Portland Steel ===
Mays was assigned to the Portland Steel on April 5, 2016. He played in just one game for the Steel, and didn't record any statistics. On April 21, 2016, Mays was placed on recallable reassignment.

=== Iowa Barnstormers ===
On January 20, 2017, Mays signed with the Iowa Barnstormers.

=== Bloomington Edge ===
On October 11, 2017, Mays was traded to the Bloomington Edge.
