= 1948 All-America college football team =

Official list of the best college football players of 1948

The 1948 All-America college football team is composed of college football players who were selected as All-Americans by various organizations and writers that chose All-America college football teams for the 1948 season. The seven selectors recognized by the NCAA as "official" for the 1948 season are (1) the Associated Press, (2) the United Press, (3) the American Football Coaches Association (AFCA), (4) the Football Writers Association of America (FWAA), (5) the International News Service (INS), (6) the Newspaper Enterprise Association (NEA) and (7) The Sporting News.

SMU Mustangs halfback Doak Walker and Penn Quakers center Chuck Bednarik were the only players unanimously named by all seven official selectors as first-team All-Americans. Walker also won the 1948 Heisman Trophy.

== Competition among the All-American selectors ==
Collier's Weekly, which began picking All-American football teams in 1888, had employed Grantland Rice to select its All-American team for 22 years. After Rice wrote a feature story about college football for Look magazine, Collier's replaced Rice in 1948, hiring eight college coaches (paying them $500 each) and billing them as the "Supreme Court of Football." The eight coaches were Frank Leahy (Notre Dame), Matty Bell (Southern Methodist), Tuss McLaughry (Dartmouth), Bernie Bierman (Minnesota), Wally Butts (Georgia), Jeff Cravath (Southern California), Harvey Harman (Rutgers), and Lou Little (Columbia). One of the innovations touted by Collier's for 1948 was the use of news reels provided by Warner Pathe and university athletic departments to study each player. Collier's circulated an initial round of ballots to members of the American Football Coaches Association (AFCA), with their votes narrowing the selections to a group of 55 finalists. The panel of eight then studied the "motion pictures of the players in action" and selected the Collier's All-American team.

Collier's new affiliation with the AFCA ended the Saturday Evening Post's association with the group as its All-American selectors. The competition for All-American selectors led Time to write an article in September 1948 about the "scrimmage" between the magazines: "No college football star hoping to make All-America takes it more seriously than the magazines which pick them. To the magazines All-Americas are a deadly business, an important piece of promotion involving the prestige of the magazines as well as their hired experts."

The Associated Press based its selections on a poll of several hundred staff writers, newspaper sports editors and broadcasters. The AP reported that its voters overwhelming agreed on five of the first-team selections -- Dick Rifenberg of Michigan at end, Buddy Burris of Oklahoma at guard, Charlie Justice of North Carolina at back, Doak Walker at quarterback, and Bill Fischer of Notre Dame at tackle.

== The first selection of separate offensive and defensive All-American squads ==
The biggest controversy in the 1948 All-American selection process concerned the widespread use of offensive and defensive specialists, resulting from the adoption of an unlimited substitution rule. The Associated Press considered selecting separate offensive and defensive teams, but opted to continue the tradition of picking a single squad of 11 All-Americans. The AP reported on its decision as follows:

"Sharpest argument this year over bestowing All-America honors centered on the merit of recognizing men who played only offense or defense under the spreading 'two platoon' system. Separate defensive and offensive All-America first teams were proposed. Should the present cleavage widen this could become a possibility."

In the end, the AP named only three platoon players to its All-American teams—offensive specialists, Rifenberg, Justice and Bobby Stuart.

The Central Press Association noted that its 1948 All-American eleven "is not necessarily a true All-American team because of the present-day system of using two teams, an offensive and a defensive unit."

It was the International News Service (the wire service operated by the Hearst newspapers) that in 1948 became the first to break with tradition by naming separate All-American teams on offense and defense. The INS described its decision in its article announcing the selections:

"The days of selecting 11 men on an All-American first team are over, until such time as the unlimited substitution rules are altered. INS thus picks its All-America as the game is now played with the 22 man squad divided into an offensive team and a defensive team."

INS sports editor, Lawton Carver, wrote that the "era of the iron man in football is rapidly passing," as an increasing number of players were being "tutored and geared to specialize for offense or defense and must be recognized for the part they play."

== Consensus All-Americans ==
For the year 1948, the NCAA recognizes seven published All-American teams as "official" designations for purposes of its consensus determinations. The following chart identifies the NCAA-recognized consensus All-Americans and displays which first-team designations they received. The chart also reflects the published point total from the UP poll.

Name	Position	School	UP votes	Number	Official	Other
Doak Walker	Halfback	SMU	2,820	7/7	AFCA, AP, FW, INS, NEA, TSN, UP	CP, CT, LK, NYS, WC
Leo Nomellini	Tackle	Minnesota	2,034	7/7	AFCA, AP, FW, INS, NEA, TSN, UP	CP, CT, LK, NYS, WC
Chuck Bednarik	Center	Penn	2,514	7/7	AFCA, AP, FW, INS, NEA, TSN, UP	CP, CT, LK, WC
Charlie Justice	Halfback	N. Carolina	2,740	6/7	AFCA, AP, INS, NEA, TSN, UP	CO, CP, CT, WC
Jackie Jensen	Halfback	California	2,118	6/7	AFCA, FW, INS, NEA, TSN, UP	CP, LK, WC
Dick Rifenberg	End	Michigan	1,790	6/7	AP, FW, INS, NEA, TSN, UP	CP, LK, NYS, WC
Bill Fischer	Guard	Notre Dame	2,335	5/7	AP, INS, NEA, TSN, UP	CP, WC
Buddy Burris	Guard	Oklahoma	1,512	5/7	AFCA, AP, INS, NEA, UP	CT, WC
Leon Hart	End	Notre Dame	1,926	4/7	FW, INS, TSN UP	CP, CT, LK, NYS, WC
Alvin Wistert	Tackle	Michigan	1,689	3/7	AFCA, TSN, UP	CP, CT, WC
Emil Sitko	Back	Notre Dame	na	2/7	FW, TSN	LK, NYS

== All-American selections for 1948 ==
=== Ends ===
- Dick Rifenberg, Michigan (AP-1; FW-1; INS-1 [offense]; NEA-1; TSN-1; UP-1; CP-1; LK; NYS; WC-1)
- Leon Hart, Notre Dame (College Football Hall of Fame) (AP-3; FW-1 [t]; INS-1 [defense]; NEA-2; TSN-1; UP-1; CP-1; CT; LK [t]; NYS [t]; WC-1)
- Barney Poole, Mississippi (College Football Hall of Fame) (AP-1; INS-1 [defense]; NEA-2; UP-2; CP-2; TSN-2; CT)
- Sam Tamburo, Penn State (AFCA; AP-3; INS-1 [offense]; CP-2)
- George Brodnax, Georgia Tech (AFCA)
- Dan Foldberg, Army (UP-2)
- Dale Armstrong, Dartmouth (AP-2; FW-2; NEA-1; CP-3)
- Mel Sheehan, Missouri (AP-2)
- Art Weiner, North Carolina (College Football Hall of Fame) (FW-1; NEA-3; CP-3; TSN-2; LK; NYS)
- Jim Powell, Tennessee (NEA-3)
- Warren Huey, Michigan State (FW-2)
- Dan Garza, Oregon (FW-3)

=== Tackles ===
- Leo Nomellini, Minnesota (College and Pro Football Hall of Fame) (AFCA; AP-1; FW-1; INS-1 [offensive guard]; NEA-1; TSN-1; UP-1; CP-1; LK; CT [g]; NYS; WC-1)
- Alvin Wistert, Michigan (College Football Hall of Fame) (AFCA; FW-2; NEA-2; UP-1; CP-1; TSN-1; CT; WC-1)
- Tim Turner, California (INS-1 [defense])
- Al DeRogatis, Duke (College Football Hall of Fame) (AP-2; UP-2; NEA-3; CP-3; CT)
- Phillip O'Reilly, Purdue (UP-2; TSN-2)
- Bill Kay, Iowa (AP-2)
- Norman Meseroll, Tennessee (AP-3)
- Ernie Stautner, Boston College (Pro Football Hall of Fame) (AP-3; NEA-3; CP-3)
- Nick Bolkovac, Pittsburgh (NEA-2)
- Laurie Niemi, Washington State (CP-2; INS-1 [offense])
- Paul Lea, Tulane (CP-2; INS-1 [offense])
- Len Szafaryn, North Carolina (FW-2)
- Chester Fritz, Missouri (FW-3; TSN-2)
- William Koch, Princeton (FW-3)

=== Guards ===
- Buddy Burris, Oklahoma (AFCA; AP-1; FW-2; INS-1 [defense]; NEA-1; UP-1; CP-2; TSN-2; CT; WC-1)
- Bill Fischer, Notre Dame (College Football Hall of Fame) (AP-1 [t]; INS-1 [defensive tackle]; NEA-1; TSN-1; UP-1; CP-1; WC-1)
- Bill Healy, Georgia Tech (AP-2; FW-1; INS-1 [defense]; NEA-1 [t]; TSN-1; UP-2; CP-1; FW-1; LK)
- Rod Franz, California (College Football Hall of Fame) (AP-1; UP-2; NEA-2; CP-2; TSN-2; NYS)
- Marty Wendell, Notre Dame (AFCA; CP-3; FW-2)
- Don Mason, Michigan State (AP-2)
- Joseph Quinn, Cornell (AP-3)
- Vern Sterling, Santa Clara (AP-3; FW-3)
- Joe Henry, Army (NEA-2; INS-1 [offense]; FW-1; LK; NYS)
- Paul Kelly, Penn State (NEA-3)
- Dominic Tomasi, Michigan (NEA-3; CP-3; FW-3)

=== Centers ===
- Chuck Bednarik, Pennsylvania (College and Pro Football Hall of Fame) (AFCA; AP-1; FW-1; INS-1 [offense]; NEA-1; TSN-1; UP-1; CP-1; LK; CT; WC-1)
- Alex Sarkisian, Northwestern (College Football Hall of Fame) (UP-2; NEA-2; CP-2; INS-1 [defense]; TSN-2; NYS)
- Dick Harris, Texas (AP-2; CP-3)
- Tommy Thompson, William and Mary (AP-3; NEA-3)
- Bill Yeoman, Army (FW-2)
- Clayton Tonnemaker, Minnesota (FW-3)

=== Backs ===
- Doak Walker, SMU (College and Pro Football Hall of Fame) (AFCA [qb]; AP-1; FW-1; INS-1 [defense]; NEA-1; TSN-1; UP-1; CP-1; CT; LK; NYS [hb]; WC-1)
- Charlie Justice, North Carolina (College Football Hall of Fame) (AFCA [hb]; AP-1; FW-2; INS-1 [offense]; NEA-1; TSN-1; UP-1; CO-1; CP-1; CT; WC-1)
- Jackie Jensen, California (College Football Hall of Fame; 1958 American League MVP) (AFCA [fb]; AP-3; FW-1; NEA-1; INS-1 [offense]; TSN-1; UP-1; CP-1; CN; LK; WC-1)
- Emil Sitko, Notre Dame (College Football Hall of Fame) (AP-2; FW-1; TSN-1; UP-2; NEA-2; CP-2; LK; NYS [hb])
- Clyde Scott, Arkansas (College Football Hall of Fame) (AFCA [hb]; AP-2; INS-1 [offense]; NEA-3; TSN-2; CT)
- Norm Van Brocklin, Oregon (College and Pro Football Hall of Fame) (AP-3; FW-2; INS-1 [offense]; NEA-2; UP-2; CP-3)
- John Rauch, Georgia (College Football Hall of Fame) (AP-2; FW-1; NEA-3; UP-2; CP-2; TSN-2; LK; WC-1)
- Jack Mitchell, Oklahoma (NEA-2; CP-1; NYS [qb])
- Stan Heath, University of Nevada (UP-1; CP-2; TSN-2)
- Bobby Stuart, Army (AP-1; CP-3; FW-3)
- Jack Cloud, William & Mary (College Football Hall of Fame) (UP-2; NEA-1; FW-3)
- Bobby Gage, Clemson (AP-3; INS-1 [defense])
- Art Murakowski, Northwestern (AP-1; FW-2)
- Lou Kusserow, Columbia (NYS [fb])
- Pete Elliott, Michigan (INS-1 [defense])
- George Taliaferro, Indiana (INS-1 [defense])
- Chuck Ortmann, Michigan (AP-2)
- Harry Szulborski, Purdue (CP-2)
- Gil Stephenson, Army (TSN-2)
- Fran Rogel, Penn State (NEA-2; FW-2)
- Eddie Price, Tulane (College Football Hall of Fame) (AP-3; NEA-3; CP-3)
- Joe Whisler, Ohio State (NEA-3; CP-3)
- Arnold Galiffa, Army (FW-3)
- Elwood Petchel, Penn State (FW-3)

== Key ==
- **Bold** – Consensus All-American
- -1 – First-team selection
- -2 – Second-team selection
- -3 – Third-team selection

=== Official selectors ===
- AFCA = Balloting conducted in two stages by the American Football Coaches Association for Collier's Weekly. The first stage of balloting was done at a sectional level, narrowing the slate to 55 players. The second stage of balloting was conducted by a panel of eight coaches: Frank Leahy, Matty Bell, Tuss McLaughry, Bernie Bierman, Wally Butts, Jeff Cravath, Harvey Harman and Lou Little.
- AP = Associated Press
- FW = Football Writers Association of America
- INS = International News Service (Hearst newspaper syndicate)
- NEA = Newspaper Enterprise Association, based on a consensus of coaches, scouts, officials, opposing players, and "others qualified to judge players and accurately weigh their value."
- TSN = Sporting News
- UP = United Press

=== Other selectors ===
- CP = Central Press Association, selected with the assistance of the nation's football captains.
- CT = Chicago Tribune
- LK = Look magazine selected by Grantland Rice in cooperation with over 500 members of the FWAA
- NYS = New York Sun
- WC = Walter Camp Football Foundation

== See also ==
- 1948 All-Big Seven Conference football team
- 1948 All-Big Ten Conference football team
- 1948 All-Pacific Coast Conference football team
- 1948 All-SEC football team
- 1948 All-Southwest Conference football team
- 1948 All-Skyline Conference football team
