= Joe Motzko =

American ice hockey player

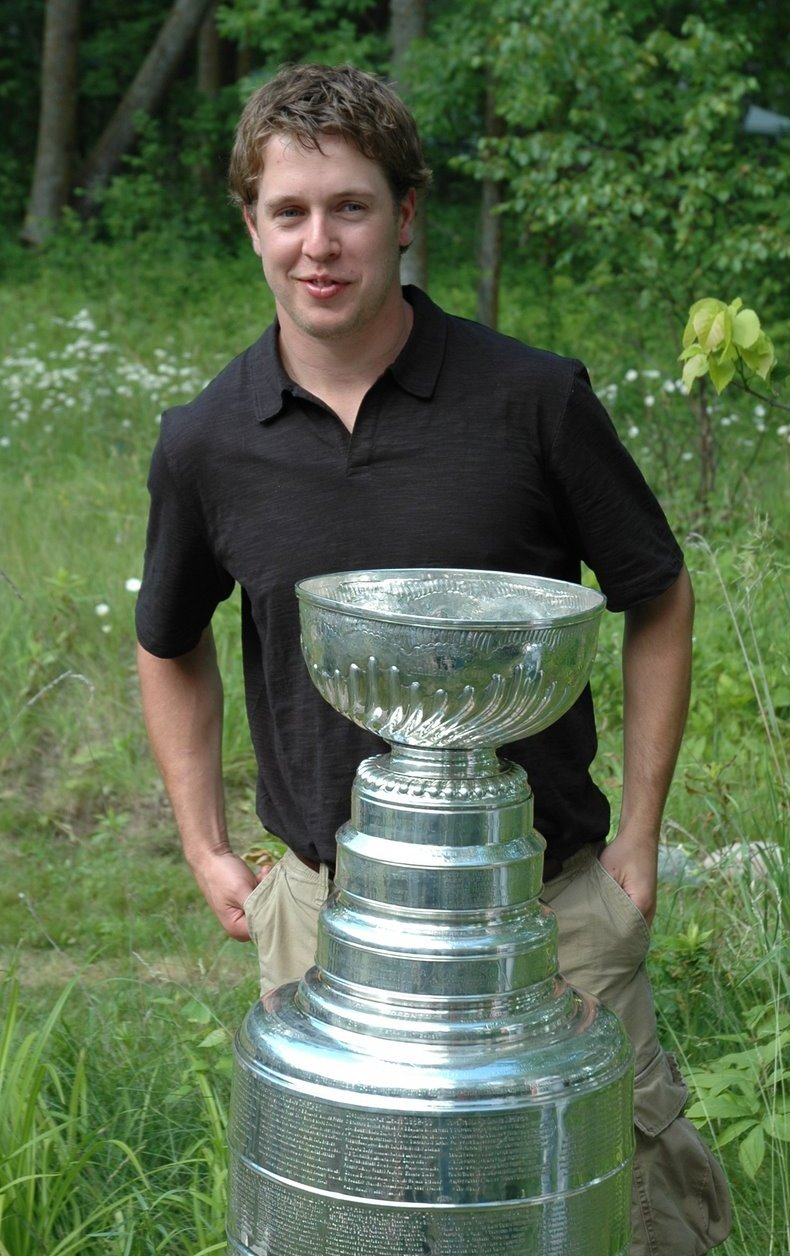
- Motzko with the Stanley Cup in 2007
- Born: March 14, 1980 (age 46) Bemidji, Minnesota, U.S.
- Height: 6 ft 1 in (185 cm)
- Weight: 196 lb (89 kg; 14 st 0 lb)
- Position: Right Wing
- Shot: Right
- Played for: Columbus Blue Jackets; Anaheim Ducks; Washington Capitals; Atlanta Thrashers; ERC Ingolstadt; EC Red Bull Salzburg; Ritten/Renon
- NHL draft: Undrafted
- Playing career: 2003–2014

Joseph Andrew Motzko (born March 14, 1980) is an American former professional ice hockey forward who played in the National Hockey League (NHL) and in European leagues.

== Playing career ==
Undrafted, Motzko played for St. Cloud State University in the Western Collegiate Hockey Association. After his senior year with St. Cloud, Motzko was signed by the Columbus Blue Jackets on May 15, 2003. He was then sent to join its affiliate, the Syracuse Crunch of the American Hockey League.

In the 2003–04 season, his first full professional season, Motzko appeared in his first NHL game with the Blue Jackets on February 2, 2004, against the Phoenix Coyotes.

In his fourth season with the Blue Jackets, mainly spent with the Syracuse Crunch, Motzko was traded by the Blue Jackets along with Mark Hartigan to the Anaheim Ducks for Curtis Glencross and Zenon Konopka on January 26, 2007. Ten days earlier, Motzko scored his first career NHL goal at the United Center in Chicago against Nikolai Khabibulin and the Chicago Blackhawks in a 5-4 Blue Jackets victory. Motzko was then assigned to the Portland Pirates before he was called up to the Ducks during the 2007 playoffs. Motzko appeared in 3 post-season games for the Stanley Cup-winning Ducks.

On July 9, 2007, Motzko was signed by the Washington Capitals. He appeared in 8 games with the Capitals (in his Capitals debut, he had 3 points scoring 2 goals and one assist) before he was traded to the Atlanta Thrashers for Alexandre Giroux on February 26, 2008. Motzko was assigned to the Thrashers affiliate, the Chicago Wolves, where he won the 2008 Calder Cup Championship. Motzko made his Thrashers debut in the 2008–09 season on January 31, 2009, in a 2-0 loss to the Carolina Hurricanes.

On July 16, 2009, Motzko signed with Russian team HC MVD of the Kontinental Hockey League. However, before ever appearing in a game with MVD, Motzko was released on September 11, and four days later signed with ERC Ingolstadt of the Deutsche Eishockey Liga.

After four seasons with Ingolstadt, Motzko left as a free agent and joined neighbouring league in Austria on a one-year deal with EC Red Bull Salzburg of the EBEL on June 26, 2013.

== Career statistics ==
			Regular season					Playoffs
Season	Team	League	GP	G	A	Pts	PIM	GP	G	A	Pts	PIM
1998–99	Omaha Lancers	USHL	51	15	21	36	60	12	7	3	10	12
1999–00	St. Cloud State	WCHA	36	9	15	24	52	—	—	—	—	—
2000–01	St. Cloud State	WCHA	41	17	20	37	54	—	—	—	—	—
2001–02	St. Cloud State	WCHA	39	9	30	39	34	—	—	—	—	—
2002–03	St. Cloud State	WCHA	38	17	25	42	59	—	—	—	—	—
2002–03	Syracuse Crunch	AHL	2	0	0	0	0	—	—	—	—	—
2003–04	Syracuse Crunch	AHL	70	17	24	41	38	7	2	2	4	6
2003–04	Columbus Blue Jackets	NHL	2	0	0	0	0	—	—	—	—	—
2004–05	Syracuse Crunch	AHL	79	28	38	66	72	—	—	—	—	—
2005–06	Syracuse Crunch	AHL	61	27	34	61	54	3	0	0	0	0
2005–06	Columbus Blue Jackets	NHL	2	0	0	0	0	—	—	—	—	—
2006–07	Syracuse Crunch	AHL	33	13	23	36	29	—	—	—	—	—
2006–07	Columbus Blue Jackets	NHL	7	1	0	1	0	—	—	—	—	—
2006–07	Portland Pirates	AHL	34	15	14	29	20	—	—	—	—	—
2006–07	Anaheim Ducks	NHL	—	—	—	—	—	3	0	0	0	2
2007–08	Hershey Bears	AHL	48	21	27	48	44	—	—	—	—	—
2007–08	Washington Capitals	NHL	8	2	2	4	0	—	—	—	—	—
2007–08	Chicago Wolves	AHL	24	6	16	22	16	16	2	9	11	12
2008–09	Chicago Wolves	AHL	73	29	27	56	82	—	—	—	—	—
2008–09	Atlanta Thrashers	NHL	6	1	0	1	0	—	—	—	—	—
2009–10	ERC Ingolstadt	DEL	48	18	16	34	74	10	3	5	8	10
2010–11	ERC Ingolstadt	DEL	50	28	22	50	66	3	0	1	1	4
2011–12	ERC Ingolstadt	DEL	44	8	20	28	50	8	3	0	3	6
2012–13	ERC Ingolstadt	DEL	52	15	21	36	42	6	3	2	5	14
2013–14	EC Red Bull Salzburg	EBEL	45	11	20	31	34	14	1	7	8	16
2014–15	Ritten/Renon	ITL	1	0	0	0	0	—	—	—	—	—
NHL totals			25	4	2	6	0	3	0	0	0	2

== Awards and achievements ==
- 1997-98 MSHSL Mr. Hockey Semifinalist (Bemidji High School)
- 1999-00 WCHA Rookie of the Week (St. Cloud State)
- 2000-01 WCHA Broadmoor Trophy (St. Cloud State)
- 2006–07 NHL Stanley Cup (Anaheim Ducks)
- 2007–08 AHL Calder Cup (Chicago Wolves)
- 2010 Bemidji High School Athletic Hall of Fame
