= Bill Swiacki =

American football player and coach (1922–1976)

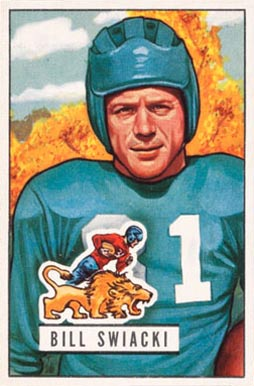

No. 81, 88
- Position: End

Personal information
- Born: October 2, 1922; Southbridge, Massachusetts, U.S.
- Died: July 7, 1976 (aged 53); Sturbridge, Massachusetts, U.S.
- Listed height: 6 ft 2 in (1.88 m)
- Listed weight: 195 lb (88 kg)

Career information
- College: Holy Cross; Columbia
- NFL draft: 1946: 16th round, 142nd overall pick

Career history

Playing
- New York Giants (1948–1950); Detroit Lions (1951–1952)

Coaching
- New York Giants (1954) Ends; Toronto Argonauts (1955-1956); Los Angeles Rams (1958) Ends

Awards and highlights
- NFL champion (1952); Consensus All-American (1947); 2× First-team All-Eastern (1946, 1947)

Career NFL statistics
- Receptions: 139
- Receiving yards: 1,883
- Touchdowns: 18
- Stats at Pro Football Reference
- College Football Hall of Fame

William Adam Swiacki (October 2, 1922 – July 7, 1976) was an American professional football player and coach. He played college football as an end for Columbia University in 1946 and 1947 and was a consensus first-team All-American in 1947. He played professional football in the National Football League (NFL) for the New York Giants from 1948 to 1950 and for the Detroit Lions in 1951 and 1952. He was a member of the Lions' 1952 team that won the NFL championship.

== Early life ==
Swiacki was born in Southbridge, Massachusetts, in 1922. He was of Polish descent

== College football and military service ==
Swiacki began his college education at the College of the Holy Cross in Worcester, Massachusetts. He played at the end position for the Holy Cross Crusaders football team in 1942. He then served as a second lieutenant and navigator on a B-17 Flying Fortress in the United States Army Air Forces during World War II. After the war, he attended Columbia University and played college football at the end position for the Columbia Lions in 1946 and 1947. On October 26, 1947, Swiacki gained national fame when his nine pass receptions led Columbia to a 21-20 victory over Army, breaking the Cadets' 32-game winning streak. At the end of the 1947 season, Swiacki was a consensus All-American, receiving first-team honors from, among others, the American Football Coaches Association, the Associated Press, the United Press, Collier's Weekly, the International News Service, and the Newspaper Enterprise Association.

== Professional football ==
He later played professional football in the National Football League (NFL) as an end for the New York Giants from 1948 to 1950 and for the Detroit Lions from 1951 to 1952. He was a member of the 1952 Detroit Lions team that won the NFL championship. In September 1953, Swiacki announced that he was retiring from football to devote his time to business in his hometown of Southbridge, Massachusetts. In five years in the NFL, Swiacki appeared in 59 games and caught 139 passes for 1,883 yards for 18 touchdowns.

== NFL career statistics ==
Legend
	Won the NFL championship
**Bold**	Career high

=== Regular season ===
Year	Team	Games		Receiving				
Year	Team	GP	GS	Rec	Yds	Avg	Lng	TD
1948	NYG	12	1	39	550	**14.1**	**65**	**10**
1949	NYG	12	9	**47**	**652**	13.9	42	4
1950	NYG	12	8	20	280	14.0	38	3
1951	DET	12	5	16	188	11.8	24	0
1952	DET	11	6	17	213	12.5	26	1
Career		59	29	139	1,883	13.5	65	18

=== Playoffs ===
Year	Team	Games		Receiving				
Year	Team	GP	GS	Rec	Yds	Avg	Lng	TD
1950	NYG	1	0	0	0	0.0	0	0
1952	DET	2	0	**1**	**14**	**14.0**	**14**	0
Career		3	0	1	14	14.0	14	0

== Coaching career ==
In May 1954, Swiacki was hired as the end coach for the New York Giants. In May 1955, he was hired as the head coach for the Toronto Argonauts. After two seasons with the Argonauts, Swiacki quit the job in November 1956.

== Head coaching record ==
Team	Year	Regular season					Postseason			
Team	Year	Won	Lost	Ties	Win %	Finish	Won	Lost	Win %	Result
TOR	1955	4	8	0	.333	3rd in IRFU	1	1	.500	Lost to Montreal Alouettes in IFRU final
TOR	1956	4	10	0	.286	4th in IRFU	—	—	—	—
Total		8	18	0	.308		1	1	.500	

== Family and later years ==
After retiring from football, Swiacki returned to Massachusetts and went into the real estate business. He and his wife, Charlotte Lester Swiacki (1926-1999), had a son, Bill, Jr., and a daughter, Leslie. Bill, Jr., was a standout three-sport athlete at Amherst College who was drafted by both the NFL's New York Giants and Major League Baseball's Los Angeles Dodgers.

Swiacki was named to the College Football Hall of Fame in April 1976. Less than three months later, in July 1976, Swiacki died at his home in Sturbridge, Massachusetts, at age 53. He was killed when his rifle accidentally discharged while Swiacki was cleaning it in the basement of his home.
