= Frank Aschenbrenner =

American football player (1925–2012)

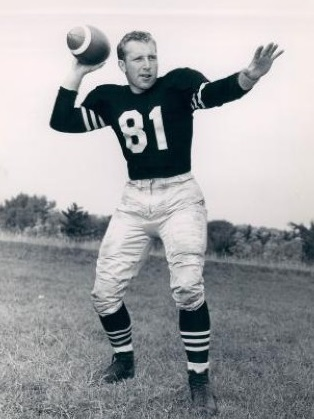
- Aschenbrenner in 1949

Profile
- Position: Halfback

Personal information
- Born: July 12, 1925; Haibühl, Germany
- Died: January 30, 2012 (aged 86); Fountain Hills, Arizona, U.S.
- Listed height: 5 ft 11 in (1.80 m)
- Listed weight: 188 lb (85 kg)

Career information
- College: Marquette; North Carolina; Northwestern
- NFL draft: 1947: 6th round, 38th overall pick

Career history
- 1949: Chicago Hornets
- 1951: Montreal Alouettes

Awards and highlights
- Second-team All-Big Nine (1948); Rose Bowl Player of the Game (1947)
- Stats at Pro Football Reference

Other information
- Military career
- Allegiance: United States
- Branch: U.S. Navy
- Service years: 1942–1946
- Unit: U.S. Naval Air Corps
- Conflicts: World War II

Francis Xavier Aschenbrenner (July 12, 1925 – January 30, 2012) was a professional American football player for the Chicago Hornets and the Montreal Alouettes.

== Early life ==
Aschenbrenner was born Francis Xavier Aschenbrenner on July 12, 1925, in Germany. At the age of 3, he boarded a steamship with his parents to begin their life in the United States and moved to Milwaukee. He started his college football career at Marquette University, until the outbreak of World War II.

During the war, Aschenbrenner served in the United States Naval Air Corps. While training at the University of North Carolina at Chapel Hill in 1944, Aschenbrenner also played football there. In 1945, he played for the service team at the Great Lakes Naval Training Center under Paul Brown who also coached the Cleveland Browns. He later played on the team under Lynn Waldorf and Bear Bryant.

== Professional career ==
After the war, Aschenbrenner was drafted in the sixth round of the 1947 NFL draft by the Pittsburgh Steelers and also in the first round of the 1947 AAFC Draft by the Buffalo Bills. Aschenbrenner, however, returned to college to finish his education at Northwestern University and never played for the Steelers or Bills.

In fact, his rights were traded by both teams with the Steelers sending him to the Los Angeles Rams and the Bills to the Cleveland Browns. Meanwhile, Aschenbrenner became a star at Northwestern and played in the 1949 Rose Bowl, where he was named the outstanding player in the game, running for 119 yards, which included a 73-yard dash for a touchdown to open the scoring. Aschenbrenner's rights in the AAFC had been traded by Cleveland to the Chicago Hornets. Aschenbrenner played six games for Chicago in 1949, but the team had tried to convert him to defense, where he had never played before. The experiment proved a failure and he was soon released.

Aschenbrenner then spent another two years in the Navy Air Corps before a brief four game stint with the Montreal Alouettes of the Canadian Football League in 1951.

In 1993, Aschenbrenner was inducted into the Rose Bowl Hall of Fame, along with Bo Schembechler and O. J. Simpson. He died on January 30, 2012, in Arizona.
