= Joe Steffy =

American football player (1926–2011)

No. 61
- Position: Guard

Personal information
- Born: April 3, 1926; Chattanooga, Tennessee, U.S.
- Died: May 22, 2011 (aged 85); Newburgh, New York, U.S.
- Listed height: 5 ft 11 in (1.80 m)
- Listed weight: 190 lb (86 kg)

Career information
- High school: Baylor (Chattanooga)
- College: Tennessee (1944); Army (1945–1947)

Awards and highlights
- 2× National champion (1945, 1946); 2× Eastern champion (1945, 1946); Outland Trophy (1947); Consensus All-American (1947); Second-team All-American (1946); First-team All-Eastern (1947); Army Black Knights No. 61 retired
- College Football Hall of Fame (Class of 1987)

Joseph Benton Steffy Jr. (April 3, 1926 – May 22, 2011) was an American football player. He went to fight in the Korean War and received the Bronze Star Medal and the Purple Heart. He was inducted into the College Football Hall of Fame.

== Early life ==
Steffy was born in Chattanooga, Tennessee, on April 3, 1926. He attended the University of Tennessee, where he played on the football team for one season in 1944. That year, the Volunteers went undefeated in the regular season, but lost to Southern California in the Rose Bowl. The following year, he enrolled at the United States Military Academy, where he played for the Army football team for three seasons as an offensive guard and as a center on defense. The Cadets went undefeated in 1945 and 1946. In 1947, Steffy was named team captain.

== Military service ==
He graduated from USMA in 1949. In April 1950, he married Ann née Brown. As a lieutenant, Steffy served in the Korean War, where he suffered frostbite and was wounded in the foot by a grenade. Due to his injuries, he was evacuated from Hungnam to Japan, and later awarded the Bronze Star Medal.

== Later life ==
After the war, Steffy served on the Army football staff as the freshman team coach. He later owned a car dealership in Newburgh, New York. With his wife, who died in 2004, he had one son. Steffy died of a heart ailment on May 22, 2011, in Newburgh, New York, aged 85.
