= The Hit (Chuck Bednarik) =

Famous 1960 moment in football

- Gifford's injury dominated the news
Philadelphia Eagles (6–1)	New York Giants (5–1–1)
17	10
Head coach: Buck Shaw	Head coach: Jim Lee Howell
	1	2	3	4	Total
PHI	0	0	7	10	17
NYG	7	3	0	0	10
- Date: November 20, 1960
- Stadium: Yankee Stadium; The Bronx, New York City, United States

"The Hit" refers to one of the most famous plays in National Football League history: a hard tackle by the Philadelphia Eagles' Chuck Bednarik that hospitalized the New York Giants' Frank Gifford during a game played on November 20, 1960, at the original Yankee Stadium in Bronx, New York. Bednarik's tackle, which was legal and drew no penalty, has been widely described as likely the hardest and most vicious tackle in NFL history.

In the game's fourth quarter, linebacker Bednarik tackled Gifford, a running back. Gifford was knocked unconscious, removed from the field on a stretcher, and transported by ambulance to a local hospital, where he was diagnosed with a deep concussion and remained for ten days. Gifford's injuries forced him to retire from the NFL. However, after undergoing 18 months of recovery, he ultimately returned with the Giants in 1962, before permanently retiring in 1964.

== Background ==
=== Chuck Bednarik ===
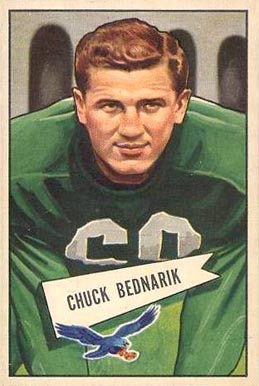
Philadelphia Eagles linebacker Chuck Bednarik's 1952 playing card

Chuck Bednarik was one of the last National Football League two-way players. As the league developed, it became too physically demanding for most players to play both offense and defense and the two-way system was phased out. Even before The Hit, Bednarik was widely known for his toughness and durability, which earned him the nickname "Concrete Charlie", although Bednarik said the nickname came from his off-season job selling ready-mixed concrete.

The son of immigrants from Slovakia, Bednarik played high school football for Liberty High School in Bethlehem, Pennsylvania, in the state's eastern Lehigh Valley region. Liberty High School competes in the Eastern Pennsylvania Conference, one of the nation's most competitive athletic divisions; conference athletes have gone on to professional athletic careers in Major League Baseball, the National Basketball Association, the National Football League, and in Olympic-level global competition.

After graduating from high school, Bednarik joined the U.S. Army Air Forces, where he flew B-24 raids over Germany during World War II, earning an Air Medal, four Oak Leaf Clusters, the European-African-Middle Eastern Campaign Medal, and four Battle Stars. After the war, he played college football for the University of Pennsylvania Quakers in Philadelphia, starting on offense and defense. He was selected by the Philadelphia Eagles with the first overall selection in the 1949 NFL draft. Bednarik played his entire 14-year career with the Philadelphia Eagles, playing offense and defense and missing just three games. After his retirement in 1962, the Eagles retired Bednarik's #60 jersey number in honor of his accomplishments. In 1967, in his first year of eligibility, he was inducted into the Pro Football Hall of Fame.

=== Frank Gifford ===
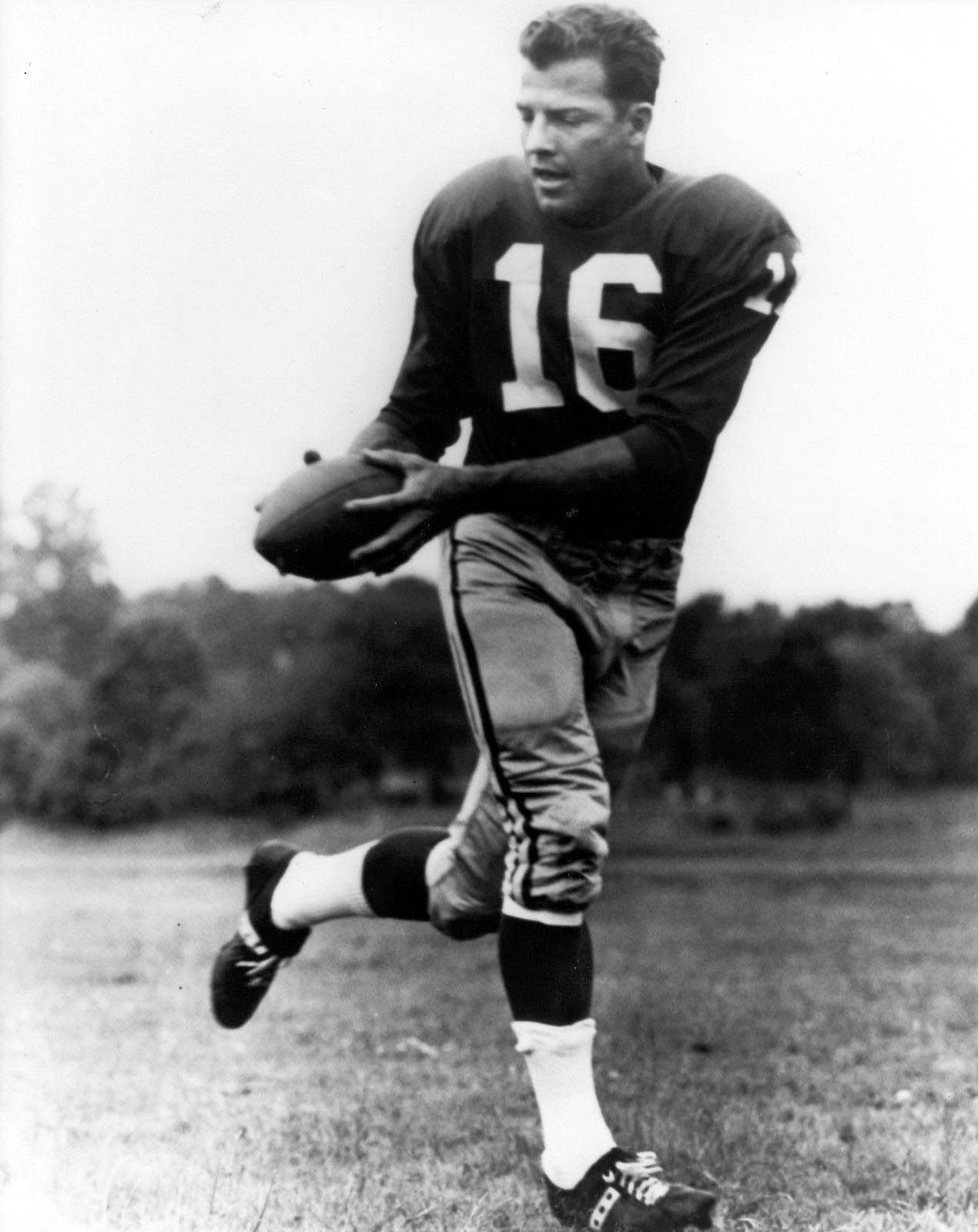
New York Giants running back Frank Gifford, c. 1952

Frank Gifford was born in Santa Monica, California, and went on to play college football for USC Trojans in Los Angeles. Gifford was drafted eleventh overall by the New York Giants in the 1952 NFL draft. Like Bednarik, he played for only one team in his NFL career. He was a running back for the Giants from 1952 through the 1960 injury, after which he announced his retirement. In 1962, he mounted a comeback with the Giants; he retired permanently after the 1964 season.

In 1977, a decade after Bednarik's 1967 induction, Gifford was inducted into the Pro Football Hall of Fame. He became an actor and sports commentator, working for Monday Night Football from 1986 until 1997. In 1986, he married television personality Kathie Lee Gifford.

== The Hit ==
The November 20, 1960, game between the Philadelphia Eagles and New York Giants at Yankee Stadium in The Bronx was important for both teams, who were vying for first place in the division. The Giants led 10–0 at halftime but the Eagles rallied to take a 17–10 lead in the fourth quarter on a fumble return for a touchdown by Jimmy Carr. With less than two minutes to play, Gifford caught a short pass from George Shaw and was met almost immediately by Bednarik, whose clothesline tackle dropped Gifford to the ground. The unconscious Gifford fumbled the football, which was recovered by linebacker Chuck Weber to secure the win.

As Gifford lay motionless on the field, Bednarik stood over him, raising his arms in celebration in what has become an iconic but controversial image, since it appeared to be an excessive celebration of Gifford's injury. Bednarik later said he was unaware of the magnitude of injuries sustained by Gifford and was merely celebrating a play that won the game for Philadelphia. Gifford later was also forgiving, saying, "Chuck hit me exactly the way I would have hit him. With his shoulder, a clean shot. That's football."

== Reactions ==
- On its 100th anniversary, the National Football League ranked Bednarik's tackle the 44th greatest play in the history of the league.
- On August 31, 2014, Nick Kosmider, a sports writer for The Denver Post labeled The Hit "one of the most iconic plays in NFL history."
- On November 10, 2010, covering the hit's 50th anniversary, The New York Times called the hit, at the time, "professional football's most notorious concussion."
- In its March 21, 2015, obituary of Bednarik, New York Daily News wrote: "Bednarik's hit on Frank Gifford in 1960 was vicious and the picture of Bednarik standing over a knocked out Gifford is iconic, and more than 50 years later, it's still one of the most famous plays in NFL history."

== Bednarik and Gifford's deaths in 2015 ==
Bednarik and Gifford both died in 2015: Bednarik died March 21 in Coopersburg, Pennsylvania, at age 89, and Gifford died August 9 in Greenwich, Connecticut, at age 84.

After Gifford's death, his family helped bring public attention to chronic traumatic encephalopathy (CTE), a disease closely related to repeated head trauma. That same year, 87 of 91 NFL players tested for CTE were found to have the disease. Gifford's family chose to have an autopsy performed on his brain, which revealed that he had CTE. The family released the autopsy results, saying in a statement, "After losing our beloved husband and father, Frank Gifford, we as a family made the difficult decision to have his brain studied in hopes of contributing to the advancement of medical research concerning the link between football and traumatic brain injury...We decided to disclose our loved one's condition to honor Frank's legacy of promoting player safety dating back to his involvement in the formation of the NFL Players Association in the 1950s." Gifford's high-profile diagnosis increased pressure on the NFL to improve player safety.
