= Herb Siegert =

American football player (1924–2008)

No. 63
- Positions: Guard, linebacker

Personal information
- Born: January 10, 1924; Pana, Illinois, U.S.
- Died: September 26, 2008 (aged 84)
- Listed height: 6 ft 3 in (1.91 m)
- Listed weight: 216 lb (98 kg)

Career information
- College: Illinois; Illinois Wesleyan
- NFL draft: 1949: 18th round, 178th overall pick

Career history
- Washington Redskins (1949–1951)

Awards and highlights
- All-American (1948); Second-team All-American (1947); Second-team All-Big Nine (1948)

Career NFL statistics
- Games played: 36
- Games started: 30
- Interceptions: 2
- Fumble recoveries: 4
- Stats at Pro Football Reference

Herbert Frank Siegert (January 10, 1924 – September 26, 2008) was an American professional football guard and linebacker in the National Football League (NFL) for the Washington Redskins.

== College career ==
Siegert originally attended Illinois Wesleyan University, and then served in World War II as a marine in the Pacific. After the war, he played college football at the University of Illinois and won the Big Ten Conference in 1946, as well as the 1947 Rose Bowl against the University of California, Los Angeles. Siegert captained the 1948 team, and won All-American honors.

== Professional career ==
Siegert was drafted in the eighteenth round of the 1949 NFL draft by the Washington Redskins, where he played from 1949 to 1951.

== Personal ==
After football, Siegert worked as an insurance agent. He and his wife Joan had five daughters.
