= Jeff Durkota =

American football player (1923–2013)

No. 83
- Positions: Fullback, linebacker

Personal information
- Born: December 20, 1923; Pittsburgh, Pennsylvania, U.S.
- Died: March 5, 2013 (aged 89); Lancaster, Pennsylvania, U.S.
- Listed height: 6 ft 0 in (1.83 m)
- Listed weight: 205 lb (93 kg)

Career information
- High school: Ebensburg (PA) Columbia
- College: Penn State (1942, 1946-1947)
- NFL draft: 1947: 16th round, 140th overall pick

Career history
- Los Angeles Dons (1948)

Awards and highlights
- Second-team All-Eastern (1947)

Career AAFC statistics
- Rushing yards: 66
- Rushing average: 4.7
- Receptions: 2
- Receiving yards: 12
- Stats at Pro Football Reference

Jeff Durkota (December 20, 1923 – March 5, 2013) was an American football fullback and linebacker. He played for the Los Angeles Dons in 1948.

He died on March 5, 2013, in Lancaster, Pennsylvania at the age of 89.
