= Jay Rhodemyre =

American football player (1923–1968)

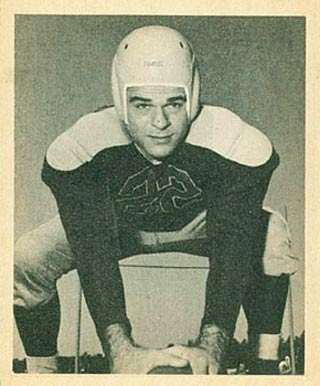
- Rhodemyre on a 1948 Bowman football card

No. 22, 85, 50
- Positions: Center, linebacker

Personal information
- Born: June 29, 1923; Ashland, Kentucky, U.S.
- Died: June 7, 1968 (aged 44); Lexington, Kentucky, U.S.
- Listed height: 6 ft 1 in (1.85 m)
- Listed weight: 210 lb (95 kg)

Career information
- College: Kentucky
- NFL draft: 1948: 7th round, 51st overall pick

Career history
- Green Bay Packers (1948–1949, 1951–1952)

Awards and highlights
- Daily News second-team All-NFL (1951); Third-team All-American (1947); First-team All-SEC (1947)

Career NFL statistics
- Games played: 45
- Games started: 40
- Fumble recoveries: 2
- Stats at Pro Football Reference

Jay Rhodemyre (June 29, 1923 – June 7, 1968) was an American professional football player who was a center for the Green Bay Packers of the National Football League (NFL). He was selected by the Packers in the seventh round of the 1948 NFL draft and played four seasons with the team.

Rhodemyer played college football for the Kentucky Wildcats and was elected to the 1948 College Football All Star Team. He was a member of Phi Sigma Kappa fraternity.
