= Barney Hafen =

American football player (1921–2012)

Barnie Hafen
- Barney Hafen, 1948, at Utah

No. 84
- Positions: Defensive end, end

Personal information
- Born: November 20, 1921; Santa Clara, Utah, U.S.
- Died: October 25, 2012 (aged 90); St. George, Utah, U.S.
- Listed height: 6 ft 2 in (1.88 m)
- Listed weight: 195 lb (88 kg)

Career information
- High school: Dixie (St. George)
- College: Utah (1946–1948)
- NFL draft: 1948: 19th round, 167th overall pick

Career history
- Detroit Lions (1949–1950)

Awards and highlights
- Third-team All-American (1947)

Career NFL statistics
- Receptions: 1
- Receiving yards: 10
- Fumble recoveries: 4
- Stats at Pro Football Reference

Banard Ervin Hafen (November 20, 1921 – October 25, 2012) was an American professional football player who played at the defensive end and end positions.

== College football ==
A native of Santa Clara, Utah, he played college football for the Utah Redskins. In October 1948, after recovering two fumbles and playing a great defensive game against Wyoming, he was selected by the Associated Press as the national lineman of the week. He was described by Bill Coltrin of the Salt Lake Telegram as "one of the greatest ends in Utah football history."

== Professional football ==
He was selected by the Detroit Lions in the 19th round (167th overall pick) of the 1948 NFL draft. The New York Yankees of the AAFC also recruited Hafen, but he signed with the Lions in January 1949. He played for the Lions during the 1949 and 1950 seasons and appeared in a total of 24 NFL games. While with the Lions, he trained in the off-season by "bull-dogging and roping cattle" on his family's ranch in Utah.
