= 1956 Toronto Argonauts season =

CFL team season

- Owner: Argonaut Rowing Club
- Head coach: Bill Swiacki
- Home stadium: Varsity Stadium

Results
- Record: 4–10
- Division place: 4th, IRFU
- Playoffs: did not qualify

The 1956 Toronto Argonauts finished in fourth place in the Interprovincial Rugby Football Union (IRFU) with a 4–10 record and failed to make the playoffs.

== Preseason ==
Game	Date	Opponent	Results		Venue	Attendance
Game	Date	Opponent	Score	Record	Venue	Attendance
A	Aug 2	at Kitchner-Waterloo Dutchmen	W 42–20	1–0	Waterloo Stadium	2,500

== Regular season ==
=== Standings ===
Interprovincial Rugby Football Union
Team	GP	W	L	T	PF	PA	Pts
Montreal Alouettes	14	10	4	0	478	361	20
Hamilton Tiger-Cats	14	7	7	0	383	385	14
Ottawa Rough Riders	14	7	7	0	326	359	14
Toronto Argonauts	14	4	10	0	331	413	8

=== Schedule ===
Week	Game	Date	Opponent	Results		Venue	Attendance
Week	Game	Date	Opponent	Score	Record	Venue	Attendance
1	1	Aug 25	at Montreal Alouettes	L 20–24	0–1	Molson Stadium	22,732
2	2	Aug 29	vs. Hamilton Tiger-Cats	L 0–18	0–2	Varsity Stadium	23,801
2	3	Sept 3	at Hamilton Tiger-Cats	L 21–31	0–3	Civic Stadium	20,725
3	4	Sept 8	vs. Montreal Alouettes	W 51–28	1–3	Varsity Stadium	20,942
4	5	Sept 12	at Hamilton Tiger-Cats	W 22–21	2–3	Civic Stadium	19,153
4	6	Sept 14	vs. Hamilton Tiger-Cats	W 41–19	3–3	Varsity Stadium	24,118
5	7	Sept 22	vs. Ottawa Rough Riders	L 20–31	3–4	Varsity Stadium	21,825
6	8	Sept 29	at Ottawa Rough Riders	L 22–43	3–5	Lansdowne Park	18,791
7	9	Oct 6	at Hamilton Tiger-Cats	L 6–42	3–6	Civic Stadium	15,125
7	10	Oct 8	vs. Hamilton Tiger-Cats	L 29–34	3–7	Varsity Stadium	19,046
8	11	Oct 13	vs. Montreal Alouettes	L 13–28	3–8	Varsity Stadium	18,679
9	12	Oct 20	at Ottawa Rough Riders	L 26–37	3–9	Lansdowne Park	13,770
10	13	Oct 27	vs. Ottawa Rough Riders	L 19–30	3–10	Varsity Stadium	15,535
11	14	Nov 3	at Montreal Alouettes	W 41–27	4–10	Molson Stadium	20,913
