= Dick Scott (American football) =

American football player (1924–2012)

Profile
- Position: Center

Personal information
- Born: November 24, 1924; Highland Falls, New York, U.S.
- Died: August 20, 2012 (aged 87); Maryland, U.S.

Career information
- High school: Highland Falls
- College: Navy
- NFL draft: 1948: 13th round, 113th overall pick

Awards and highlights
- 2× First-team All-American (1945, 1947); Second-team All-Eastern (1947)
- College Football Hall of Fame

Richard Underhill Scott (November 24, 1924 – August 20, 2012) was an American football player for the Navy Midshipmen. Scott was selected twice to the first team All-American team. He was selected first team All-America in 1945, second team in 1946, then selected again to first team in 1947. He was then drafted in the 13th round by the Chicago Bears with the 113th overall pick in the 1948 NFL draft. He was elected to the College Football Hall of Fame in 1987. He also earned varsity letters in basketball and lacrosse at the U.S. Naval Academy.

Scott graduated from Highland Falls (NY) High School in 1942.

== Sources ==
- Oldest Living College Football HOF Players - Dick Scott
- Obituary – Richard Underhill Scott
