= Alex Sarkisian =

American football player (1922–2004)

Profile
- Position: Center

Personal information
- Born: July 13, 1922; Istanbul, Turkey
- Died: December 14, 2004 (aged 82); East Chicago, Indiana, U.S.
- Listed height: 6 ft 1 in (1.85 m)
- Listed weight: 215 lb (98 kg)

Career information
- High school: Washington (East Chicago, U.S.)
- College: Northwestern
- NFL draft: 1947: 11th round, 91st overall pick

Awards and highlights
- First-team All-American (1948); First-team All-Big Nine (1948)
- College Football Hall of Fame

Alex Sarkisian (July 13, 1922 – December 14, 2004) was an American college football player. He played as a center at Northwestern University and was captain of the 1948 Northwestern Wildcats football team, which won the 1949 Rose Bowl. Sarkisian was inducted into the College Football Hall of Fame in 1998.

== Biography ==
Alex Sarkisian (Armenian: Ալեքս Սարկիսյան) was born to an Armenian family in 1922 in Istanbul, present-day Turkey. Having entered the United States through Ellis Island, his family settled in the steel mill area of Northwest Indiana. Sarkisian excelled both academically and athletically while in high school and following graduation from high school he entered the United States Army and served as a Judo instructor. He later enrolled at Northwestern University, where he played both sides of the ball as a center and linebacker and averaged over 57 minutes a game during his entire career at Northwestern.

In is junior year, Sarkisian received many honors in the nation and was touted as a first team All-American for his upcoming senior year. His senior year Sarkisian was chosen to be the Northwestern captain. His coach, Bob Voigts, remembered Sarkisian's great leadership with this story: "We were playing the eighth ranked Minnesota Gopher team with future Hall of Famers Leo Nomellini, Clayton Tonnemaker and Bud Grant and fell behind 16-0. Sarkisian called the players together and said we were going to win!! We came back to beat a great Minnesota team 19-16." Voigts went on to say, "Sarky was the finest leader he had ever seen and was the best player he ever coached."

In his senior year, Sarkisian was chosen as an All-American on both offense and defense. He was chosen as a First Team All-American linebacker in 1948 and was chosen as the Second Team All-American center that same year. He was named All-American by the Associated Press, Central Press Association, International Press, The New York Sun, Newspaper Enterprise Association, The Sporting News, United Press and numerous other publications. He was voted First Team Big Nine by all publications and was described as "The Greatest Standout Of The Entire Eleven First Team Members" of The Big Nine by the Milwaukee Sentinel Journal newspaper. {Milwaukee Sentinel Journal November 22, 1948} He was also chosen as the United States Armenian athlete of the year in 1948. Sarkisian was also lauded in many magazines and publications ranging from The Sporting News to The Christian Science Monitor to The Football News.

Sarkisian averaged 59 of 60 minutes played per game for the Wildcats in 1948. He was voted National Lineman of the week during both 1947 and 1948 seasons. In 1948 the Wildcats played numerous teams in the top 20 college rankings. Northwestern lost two games that year, one to Michigan the number one ranked team in the nation and the second on a late score by Notre Dame, the number 2 ranked team in the nation. In defeating the University of Illinois in the last game of the season, Northwestern secured a berth in the 1949 Rose Bowl.

As captain of the Wildcats, he helped lead Northwestern to the program's only Rose Bowl victory, defeating No. 4-ranked California, 20-14 on January 1, 1949. In that Rose Bowl he spearheaded a great Northwestern comeback by stopping a California Golden Bear running back on a fourth and 1 deep in Northwestern territory late in the fourth quarter, and by initiating a direct snap from center to halfback Ed Tunniclif on a misdirection play that Tunnicliff scampered for 45 yards for the winning score with less than a minute to play in the Rose Bowl.

His teammate, Johnny Miller, a sophomore halfback that season, credits Sarkisian's inspiring pep talk during the Ohio State game for helping him break two spectacular touchdown runs that snapped a 7–7 tie and produced a 21–7 victory. "Alex said, `Johnny, you have to do it. Do it with heart!'" Miller recalled. "Alex was a man's man. He was a great inspiration to that football team. We would not have gone the route we did without him." Sarkisian is the lone member of the 1949 team in the College Football Hall of Fame.

Sarkisianwas a member of the College All-Stars who played the defending NFL champion Philadelphia Eagles at Soldier Field in Chicago, on August 22, 1949. He was a high round draft choice of those same Philadelphia Eagles of the NFL as a sophomore in the 1947 NFL Draft and was also a high draft choice of the Cleveland Browns as a junior in the 1948 AAFC Draft.

Sarkisian was a member of the Armenian American Hall of Fame, Northwestern University Hall of Fame, The Indiana Football Hall of Fame and numerous local Halls of Fame. He was elected to the College Football Hall of Fame in 1998. He was married to Ann Buchakian of Detroit, Michigan and they had four children, three of whom graduated from Northwestern University.
