= 1947 All-America college football team =

Official list of the best college football players of 1947

The 1947 All-America college football team is composed of college football players who were selected as All-Americans by various organizations and writers that chose All-America college football teams in 1947. The eight selectors recognized by the NCAA as "official" for the 1947 season are (1), the American Football Coaches Association (AFCA), (2) the Associated Press (AP), (3) Collier's Weekly, as selected by Grantland Rice, (4) the Football Writers Association of America (FW), (5) the International News Service (INS), (6) the Newspaper Enterprise Association (NEA), (7) the Sporting News (SN), and (8) the United Press (UP). Other selectors include the Central Press Association (CP) and the Walter Camp Football Foundation (WC).

Notre Dame quarterback Johnny Lujack and Michigan halfback Bob Chappuis were the only two players unanimously named by all eight official selectors as first-team All-Americans. Lujack and Chappuis also finished first and second in the 1947 Heisman Trophy voting.

== Consensus All-Americans ==
For the year 1947, the NCAA recognizes eight published All-American teams as "official" designations for purposes of its consensus determinations. The following chart identifies the NCAA-recognized consensus All-Americans and displays which first-team designations they received. The chart also reflects the published point total from the UP poll (2,211 points possible).

Name	Position	School	UP votes	Number	Official	Other
Johnny Lujack	Quarterback	Notre Dame	2,086	8/8	AFCA, AP, CO, FW, INS, NEA, SN, UP	CP, WC
Bob Chappuis	Halfback	Michigan	1,838	8/8	AFCA, AP, CO, FW, INS, NEA, SN, UP	CP, WC
Joe Steffy	Guard	Army	1,465	7/8	AFCA, CO, FW, INS, NEA, SN, UP	CP, WC
Bob Davis	Tackle	Ga.Tech.	739	7/8	AFCA, AP, CO, FW, INS, NEA, SN	CP
Doak Walker	Halfback	SMU	1,367	6/8	AFCA, AP, INS, NEA, SN, UP	CP, WC
Bill Swiacki	End	Columbia	1,041	6/8	AFCA, AP, CO, INS, NEA, UP	WC
Paul Cleary	End	USC	899	6/8	AP, CO, FW, INS, NEA, SN	CP
Bill Fischer	Guard	Notre Dame	909	5/8	AP, FW, NEA, SN, UP	CP
Chuck Bednarik	Center	Penn	899	4/8	AFCA, AP, INS, UP	WC
George Connor	Tackle	Notre Dame	1,831	4/8	AFCA, CO, SN, UP	WC
Bobby Layne	Quarterback	Texas	1,200	3/8	FW, SN, UP	CP

== All-American selections for 1947 ==
=== Ends ===
- Paul Cleary, USC (College Football Hall of Fame) (AP-1; CO; FW-1; INS-1; NEA-1; SN; UP-2; CP-1)
- Bill Swiacki, Columbia (AFCA; AP-1; CO; INS-1; NEA-1; UP-1; CP-2; WC-1)
- Barney Poole, Mississippi (College Football Hall of Fame) (AFCA; AP-3; FW-2; INS-3; NEA-2; SN; UP-1; CP-1; WC-1)
- Leon Hart, Notre Dame (College Football Hall of Fame) (FW-1)
- Bob Mann, Michigan (AP-2; UP-3; NEA-3; CP-3)
- Ike Owens, Illinois (AP-2; NEA-2; CP-3; INS-2; FW-3)
- Len Ford, Michigan (Pro Football Hall of Fame) (AP-3; UP-2; CP-2)
- Tom Fears, UCLA (College and Pro Football Hall of Fame) (UP-3; NEA-3; INS-2; FW-2)
- Barney Hafen, Utah (INS-3)
- Max Bumgardner, Texas (FW-3)

=== Tackles ===
- Bob Davis, Georgia Tech (AFCA; AP-1; CO; FW-1; INS-1; NEA-1; SN; UP-2; CP-1)
- George Connor, Notre Dame (College and Pro Football Hall of Fame) (AFCA; AP-3; CO; INS-3; NEA-2; SN; UP-1; CP-2; WC-1)
- John Ferraro, USC (College Football Hall of Fame) (AP-3; FW-2; INS-2; NEA-2; UP-1; CP-1; WC-1)
- Dick Harris, Texas (AP-1; CP-3; INS-3; FW-3)
- Zygmont Czarobski, Notre Dame (College Football Hall of Fame) (AP-2; UP-3; NEA-1; CP-3; INS-1; FW-2)
- Malachi Mills, VMI (AP-2)
- George Savitsky, Penn (UP-2; FW-1)
- Bruce Hilkene, Michigan (NEA-3)
- Goble Bryant, Army (CP-2; FW-3)
- Phil O'Reilly, Purdue (INS-2)

=== Guards ===
- William Fischer, Notre Dame (College Football Hall of Fame) (AP-1; FW-1; INS-2; NEA-1; SN; UP-1; CP-1)
- Joe Steffy, Army (College Football Hall of Fame) (AFCA; AP-3; CO; FW-1; INS-1; NEA-1; SN; UP-1; CP-1; WC-1)
- Steve Suhey, Penn State (College Football Hall of Fame) (AP-1; CO; INS-1; UP-3; NEA-2; CP-3)
- Leo Nomellini, Minnesota (College and Pro Football Hall of Fame) (AP-2; INS-2; NEA-2; UP-2; CP-2)
- Rod Franz, California (College Football Hall of Fame) (AFCA; AP-2; FW-2; INS-3; CP-2; WC-1)
- Knox Ramsey, William & Mary (UP-2; NEA-3 [tackle])
- Mike Dimitro, UCLA (AP-3; INS-3; FW-3)
- John Magee, Rice (NEA-3)
- Jon Baker, California (NEA-3)
- Howie Brown, Indiana (CP-3)
- Dominic Tomasi, Michigan (UP-3)
- Herb Siegert, Illinois (FW-2)
- Bill Healy, Georgia Tech (FW-3)

=== Centers ===
- Chuck Bednarik, Pennsylvania (College and Pro Football Hall of Fame) (AFCA; AP-1; FW-3; INS-1; NEA-2; UP-1; CP-2; WC-1)
- Dick Scott, Navy (AP-2; CO; FW-1; INS-2; NEA-1; SN; UP-2; CP-1)
- Jay Rhodemyre, Kentucky (AP-3)
- George Strohmeyer, Notre Dame (UP-3; NEA-3)
- John Rapacz, Oklahoma (CP-3; INS-3)
- J. T. White, Michigan (FW-2)

=== Quarterbacks ===
- Johnny Lujack, Notre Dame (College Football Hall of Fame) (AP-1; UP-1; AFCA; CO; NEA-1; CP-1; INS-1; SN; WC-1; FW-1)
- Bobby Layne, Texas (College and Pro Football Hall of Fame) (AP-3; FW-1; INS-2; NEA-2; SN; UP-1; CP-1)
- Charlie Conerly, Mississippi (College Football Hall of Fame) (AP-2; UP-2; NEA-1; CP-2; INS-1; FW-1)

=== Backs ===
- Bob Chappuis, Michigan (College Football Hall of Fame) (AP-1; UP-1; AFCA; CO; NEA-1; CP-1; INS-1; SN; WC-1; FW-1)
- Doak Walker, SMU (College and Pro Football Hall of Fame) (AP-1; UP-1; AFCA; NEA-1; CP-1; INS-1; SN; WC-1; FW-2)
- Ray Evans, Kansas (College Football Hall of Fame) (AP-1; CO; NEA-3; CP-3; INS-2; FW-3)
- Bump Elliott, Michigan (College Football Hall of Fame) (AP-2; UP-2; AFCA; NEA-3; CP-2; INS-3; FW-2)
- Skip Minisi, Penn (College Football Hall of Fame) (AP-3; UP-2; CO; NEA-3; CP-3; INS-3; WC-1; FW-2)
- Harry Gilmer, Alabama (College Football Hall of Fame) (AP-2; UP-2; NEA-2; CP-2; INS-2; FW-2)
- Charlie Justice, North Carolina (College Football Hall of Fame) (AP-2; UP-3; NEA-2; CP-3; INS-3)
- Clyde Scott, Arkansas (College Football Hall of Fame) (AP-3; CP-3; INS-3)
- Jack Cloud, William & Mary (College Football Hall of Fame) (AP-3)
- George Taliaferro, Indiana (College Football Hall of Fame) (NEA-2)
- Don Doll, USC (NEA-3; FW-3)
- Elwyn Rowan, Army (CP-2)
- Jake Leicht, Oregon (INS-2)
- Terry Brennan, Notre Dame (UP-3; FW-3)
- Harry Szulborski, Purdue (FW-3)

== Key ==
- **Bold** – Consensus All-American
- -1 – First-team selection
- -2 – Second-team selection
- -3 – Third-team selection

=== Official selections ===
- AFCA = American Football Coaches Association, published in the Saturday Evening Post
- AP = Associated Press
- CO = Collier's Weekly, selected by Grantland Rice
- FWAA = Football Writers Association of America
- INS = International News Service (Hearst newspaper syndicate)
- NEA = Newspaper Enterprise Association, based on a consensus of coaches, scouts, officials, opposing players, and "others qualified to judge players and accurately weigh their value."
- SN = Sporting News
- UP = United Press

=== Other selectors ===
- CP = Central Press Association, selected with the assistance of the nation's football captains.
- WC = Walter Camp Football Foundation

== See also ==
- 1947 All-Big Six Conference football team
- 1947 All-Big Ten Conference football team
- 1947 All-Pacific Coast Conference football team
- 1947 All-SEC football team
- 1947 All-Southwest Conference football team
