= Steve Suhey =

American football player (1922–1977)

Profile
- Position: Guard

Personal information
- Born: January 8, 1922; Jamesville, New York, U.S.
- Died: January 8, 1977 (aged 55); State College, Pennsylvania, U.S.

Career information
- College: Penn State (1942, 1946–1947)
- NFL draft: 1948

Career history
- 1948–1949: Pittsburgh Steelers

Awards and highlights
- First-team All-American (1947); First-team All-Eastern (1947)
- Stats at Pro Football Reference
- College Football Hall of Fame

Steven Joseph Suhey (January 8, 1922 – January 8, 1977) was an American professional football player who was a guard for two seasons with the Pittsburgh Steelers of the National Football League (NFL). He was an All-American playing college football for the Penn State Nittany Lions. Suhey was inducted into the College Football Hall of Fame in 1985. His son Matt Suhey also played at Penn State and in the NFL.

== Penn State ==
Suhey's college career was interrupted by three years of service in the United States Army Air Corps during World War II.

Suhey was the MVP of the 1948 Cotton Bowl Classic. It has been suggested Penn State's now-famous "We Are Penn State!" stadium cheer has its origins in a statement made by team captain Suhey prior to that game. Suhey is said to have declared, “We are Penn State. There will be no meetings,” in response to SMU's request for a meeting to protest the participation of Penn State's two black players (Wallace Triplett and Dennie Hoggard).

While at Penn State, Suhey became a member of Sigma Pi fraternity.

== Personal life ==
After playing two seasons in the NFL with the Pittsburgh Steelers, Suhey coached high school football before joining the L.G. Balfour Company.

=== "First family of Nittany Lion football" ===
Suhey married Virginia "Ginger" Higgins, a daughter of Bob Higgins, a former All-American at Penn State and Suhey's college coach. Three of their sons, Larry, Paul, and Matt, were lettermen at Penn State from 1975 to 1979. Matt would go on to play 10 seasons in the NFL with the Chicago Bears. One grandson, Kevin Suhey, was a quarterback and special teams player for the Nittany Lions from 2005 to 2007 and another grandson, Joe Suhey, was a running back for Penn State from 2007 to 2010. The Higgins-Suhey family has been called the "first family of Nittany Lion football", with 90 years of involvement with the Penn State football program.
