= Skip Minisi =

American football player (1926–2005)

Skippy Minisi
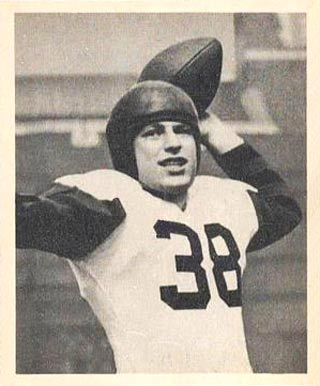
- Minisi on a 1948 Bowman football card

No. 38
- Positions: Halfback, defensive back

Personal information
- Born: September 18, 1926; Newark, New Jersey, U.S.
- Died: May 5, 2005 (aged 78); Paoli, Pennsylvania, U.S.
- Listed height: 5 ft 11 in (1.80 m)
- Listed weight: 190 lb (86 kg)

Career information
- High school: Newark Academy (Livingston, New Jersey)
- College: Pennsylvania (1944, 1946-1947); Navy (1945)
- NFL draft: 1948: 1st round, 2nd overall pick

Career history
- New York Giants (1948)

Awards and highlights
- First-team All-American (1947); 2× First-team All-Eastern (1946, 1947); Second-team All-Eastern (1944)

Career NFL statistics
- Rushing yards: 160
- Rushing average: 4.4
- Receptions: 13
- Receiving yards: 123
- Total touchdowns: 2
- Stats at Pro Football Reference
- College Football Hall of Fame

Anthony Salvatore "Skip" Minisi (September 18, 1926 – May 5, 2005) was an American professional football halfback in the National Football League (NFL) for the New York Giants. He was elected to the College Football Hall of Fame in 1985 based on his college career at the University of Pennsylvania and the United States Naval Academy.

After being the second pick overall in the 1948 NFL draft, Minisi played his rookie season for the New York Giants. After completing his rookie season, Minisi retired from professional football to attend the University of Pennsylvania's School of Law. He was a successful attorney for more than 40+ years with a practice in Philadelphia, Pennsylvania.

== See also ==
- List of NCAA major college yearly punt and kickoff return leaders
