= 1946 Army vs. Notre Dame football game =

1946 Army vs. Notre Dame
- Non-conference game "Game of the Century"
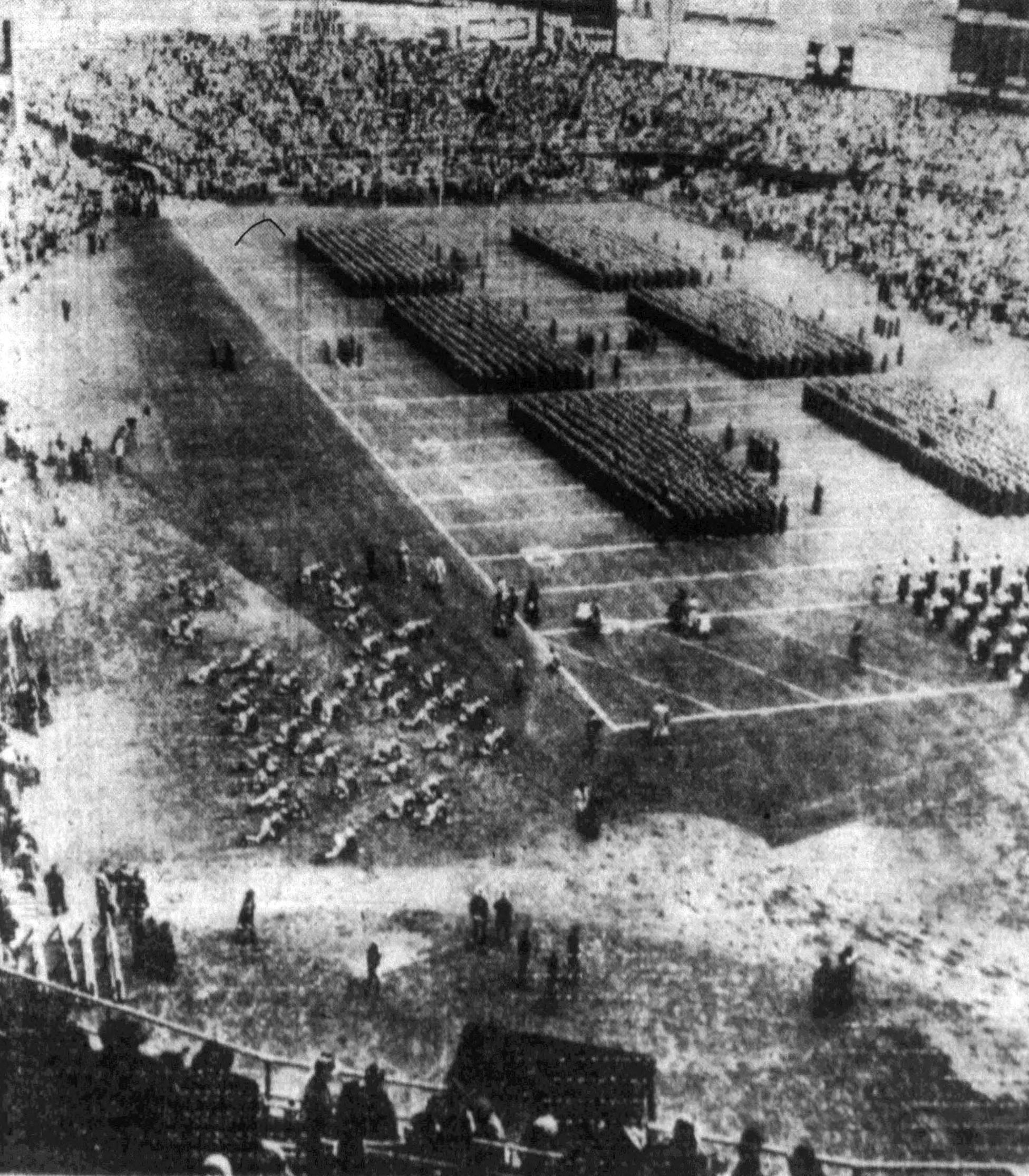
- The West Point Corps of Cadets on the field at the Army–Notre Dame football game on November 9, 1946 at Yankee Stadium.
Notre Dame Fighting Irish	Army Cadets
(6–0)	(6–0)
0	0
Head coach: Frank Leahy	Head coach: Earl Blaik
AP 2	AP 1
	1	2	3	4	Total
Notre Dame	0	0	0	0	0
Army	0	0	0	0	0
- Date: November 9, 1946
- Season: 1946
- Stadium: Yankee Stadium
- Location: Bronx, New York
- Attendance: 74,121 (capacity crowd)

The 1946 Army vs. Notre Dame football game was a regular season college football game played on November 9, 1946. Army (the football program of the United States Military Academy at West Point, New York), then ranked No. 1 in the Associated Press college football poll, played the University of Notre Dame, of South Bend, Indiana, ranked No. 2, at Yankee Stadium in The Bronx.

== The teams ==
This matchup, with the national attention it received in the era before the service academies ceased to be major football powers, was usually played at a neutral site, often in New York City.

=== Previous matchups ===
The 1924 game between the schools, a Notre Dame victory at the Polo Grounds, was the game at which sportswriter Grantland Rice christened the Fighting Irish backfield—quarterback Harry Stuhldreher, halfbacks Jim Crowley and Don Miller, and fullback Elmer Layden—the "Four Horsemen". The 1928 edition, with Notre Dame trailing Army at halftime at Yankee Stadium, was the game in which Notre Dame coach Knute Rockne delivered his "Win one for the Gipper" speech, resulting in a comeback win for the Fighting Irish.

=== The 1946 season ===
Both teams were undefeated going into the 1946 game at Yankee Stadium. Both teams averaged over 30 points per game.

Army had a 25-game winning streak, last losing to Notre Dame in 1943 (26–0), but had won the last two contests between the schools by scores of 59–0 and 48–0. Army had the defending Heisman Trophy winner, Doc Blanchard, also known as "Mr. Inside", the man who would win it that year, Glenn Davis, also known as "Mr. Outside", and one of the nation's top quarterbacks in Arnold Tucker.

Notre Dame had the quarterback who would win the Heisman the next year, Johnny Lujack, and end Leon Hart of Notre Dame won the Heisman in 1949 (the only time ever that a college football game had four Heisman Trophy winners). Lujack, along with several other teammates and coach Frank Leahy, had returned to the team for the 1946 season after serving in World War II. Both Tucker and Lujack were also outstanding defensive backs at a time when football players, college as well as professional, usually played both offense and defense.

Notre Dame had defeated eventual 1947 Rose Bowl champion Illinois in Champaign, 26–6, to open the season. On October 26, they won at #17 Iowa, 41–6. The game leading up to this one was a 28–0 Irish defeat of Navy at Baltimore.

== Game summary ==
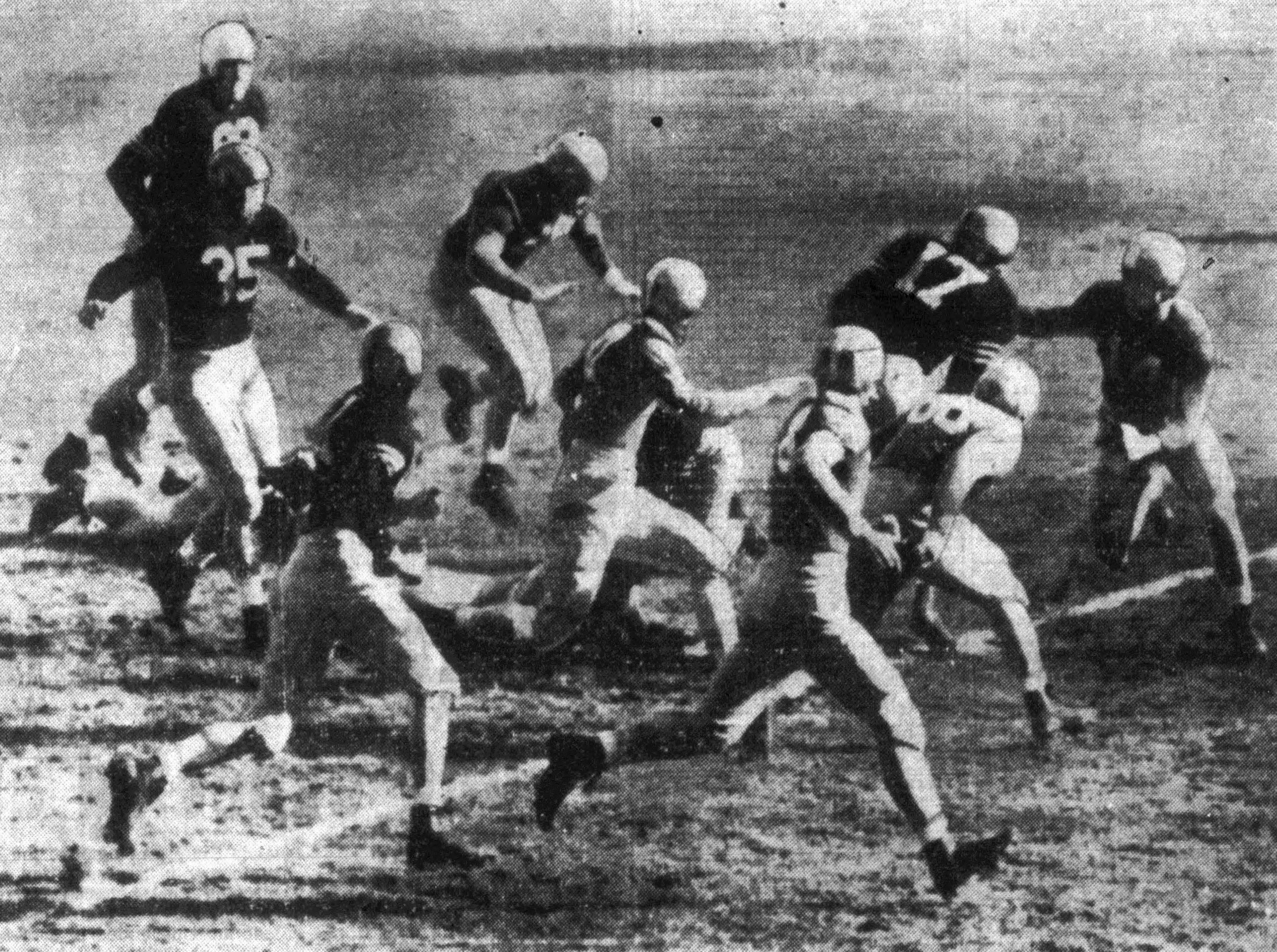
The opening kickoff of the 1946 "Game of the Century". Army quarterback Arnold Tucker (number 17) completed a 23-yard return. Notre Dame halfback Emil Sitko (number 14) made the tackle.

Despite the high-scoring and much-hyped offenses, the game ended in a scoreless tie. The teams combined for ten turnovers: Army had four, which all occurred in the second half, and Notre Dame had six, three of which were interceptions caught by Arnold Tucker.

Army's best scoring chance in the first half came after a Notre Dame fumble on its first possession of the game. However, after taking the ball over on the Notre Dame 23-yard line, Army turned the ball over on downs, which included back-to-back rushes by Doc Blanchard on third and fourth downs.

In the second quarter, Notre Dame put together a 12-play drive that started on its own 12-yard line. On fourth-and-inches from the Army 4-yard line, the Fighting Irish also opted not to go for a field goal. Instead, Johnny Lujack tossed the ball to Gerard Cowhig, who appeared to have reached the line of gain. However, a clipping penalty was called against Notre Dame, which nullified the play. As a result, Army took over possession.

The second half saw neither team enter the red zone, with each school's best chance at a scoring drive coming back-to-back: Tucker intercepting Lujack for the second time, and Lujack then making a touchdown-saving tackle on Blanchard on the very next play from scrimmage. That play, which "became a piece of Notre Dame lore", and a subsequent interception on a halfback pass thrown by Army's Glenn Davis amounted to "the last scoring threat for either team".

== Analysis ==
=== Defenses ===
Notre Dame's defense did something no other team had ever done — it held the famous "Touchdown Twins", Blanchard and Davis, to a total of 79 yards. As an indication of how the defense of both teams dominated, seven linemen in that game were nominated for Lineman of the Week honors in the weekly Associated Press poll. Joe Steffy, an Army guard who helped shut down the Notre Dame running game, won the honor, followed closely by Notre Dame right tackle George Sullivan and freshman lineman Jim Martin, who helped stifle Army's running attack and dropped Davis on consecutive plays for losses totaling 17 yards.

Notre Dame coach Leahy called the game "a terrific battle of defenses."

=== Fourth-down decisions ===
Both teams turned the ball over on downs a total of six times (Army four times, Notre Dame twice). This included an Army fourth down from the opponent's 16-yard line in the first quarter, and a Notre Dame fourth down with inches to go from the Army 4-yard line in the second quarter.

Neither team attempted a single field goal. Army coach Blaik had not sent in his field goal unit for a try since 1943. Notre Dame quarterback Johnny Lujack later said, "Our field-goal kicker, Fred Earl[e]y, wasn't even in pads. Our coaches would have had to thought [sic!] they could score." The two teams had averaged over 30 points per game that season.

== Aftermath ==
Both teams would finish the season undefeated with this one tie, but it was Notre Dame that was awarded the national championship by the Associated Press, with Army coming in second. Neither school accepted bowl bids in that era, and so neither put itself at risk of a loss that would have tarnished their national championship bids. The Pacific Coast Conference and the Big Nine Conference, the forerunners of the Pac-12 and Big Ten, signed the agreement to start with the 1947 Rose Bowl of matching their conference champions. The national sports writers wanted to match either Notre Dame or Army with #4 and undefeated UCLA. Instead, #5 Illinois was the first Midwestern team to go by the terms of the agreement, and routed UCLA, 45–14.

With Blanchard, Davis and Tucker having graduated, Army's unbeaten streak would be broken the next year, by Columbia University. Notre Dame would not lose until early in the 1950 season. Sporting News named the 1944-45 Army Cadets and the 1946 Fighting Irish the second and fifth greatest teams of the Twentieth Century respectively. The game itself has been called the 'Game of the Century".

This was only the sixth time that the number one ranked team faced the number two ranked team since the inception of the Associated Press Football Poll in 1936. This would not happen again until the 1963 Rose Bowl.

After the season, the schools decided to discontinue their series of annual games, which had been played since 1913 (with the exception of 1918), after the 1947 game. Army wanted to gain some flexibility in scheduling intersectional games. Moreover, in a joint statement both schools agreed that the "'game had grown to such proportions that it had come to be played under conditions escaping the control of the two colleges, some of which were not conducive to wholesome intercollegiate sport.'" Nevertheless, the two schools have played a game 17 times since their 1947 encounter (as of 2020), with Notre Dame winning 16 of these games. (Overall, Notre Dame leads the series 39–8–4).

In 2010, the two teams played at the new Yankee Stadium, which marked the second time the teams had returned to the Bronx since the 1946 "Game of the Century". Johnny Lujack was chosen as honorary captain for Notre Dame. He was joined on the Army side by Pete Dawkins, who won the Heisman Trophy in 1958, the year that saw the only Army victory over Notre Dame since the annual series had been discontinued. (Notre Dame won the game, 27–3.)

== See also ==
- Game of the Century (college football)
