= 1946 Army Cadets football team =

American college football season

1946 Army Cadets football

National champion (6 selectors) Eastern champion
- Conference: Independent

Ranking
- AP: No. 2
- Record: 9–0–1
- Head coach: Earl Blaik (6th season)
- Captains: Doc Blanchard; Glenn Davis
- Home stadium: Michie Stadium

1946 Eastern major college football independents records
	Conf.			Overall
Team	W	L	T	W		L		T
No. 2 Army		–		9	–	0	–	1
Rutgers		–		7	–	2	–	0
Penn State		–		6	–	2	–	0
Boston College		–		6	–	3	–	0
Holy Cross		–		5	–	4	–	0
NYU		–		5	–	3	–	0
Villanova		–		6	–	4	–	0
Colgate		–		4	–	4	–	0
Syracuse		–		4	–	5	–	0
Pittsburgh		–		3	–	5	–	1
Temple		–		2	–	4	–	2
Merchant Marine		–		4	–	7	–	0
Bucknell		–		3	–	6	–	0
Lafayette		–		2	–	7	–	0
Fordham		–		0	–	7	–	0
Rankings from AP Poll

The 1946 Army Cadets football team was an American football team that represented the United States Military Academy as an independent during the 1946 college football season. In their sixth season under head coach Earl Blaik, the Cadets compiled a 9–0–1 record and outscored opponents by a total of 263 to 80. Army's 1946 season was part of a 32-game undefeated streak that included the entire 1944, 1945, and 1946 seasons.

Army was ranked No. 1 for most of the season in the AP poll. However, in the final poll issued on December 2, Notre Dame jumped to No. 1 with 1,730 points, and Army was bumped to No. 2 with 1,659 points. Army was recognized as the 1946 national champion by the American Football Coaches Association, Billingsley Report, College Football Researchers Association, and Houlgate System, and as co-national champion with Notre Dame by the Boand System, Helms Athletic Foundation, and Poling System. For the third consecutive year, Army also won the 1946 Lambert Trophy as the best football team in the east.

The 1946 Army vs. Notre Dame football game at Yankee Stadium, a matchup of the top two in the rankings, is regarded as one of college football's Games of the Century; it ended in a scoreless tie.

Halfback Glenn Davis won the Heisman Trophy, and three Army players were selected as consensus first-team players on the 1946 All-America college football team: Davis; fullback Doc Blanchard; and end Hank Foldberg.

== Schedule ==
Date	Opponent	Rank	Site	Result	Attendance	Source
September 21	Villanova		Michie Stadium; West Point, NY	W 35–0	16,500	
September 28	Oklahoma		Michie Stadium; West Point, NY	W 21–7	20,000	
October 5	Cornell		Michie Stadium; West Point, NY	W 46–21	25,000–26,000	
October 12	at No. 4 Michigan	No. 2	Michigan Stadium; Ann Arbor, MI	W 20–13	85,938	
October 19	No. 11 Columbia	No. 1	Michie Stadium; West Point, NY	W 48–14	25,500	
October 26	vs. No. 13 Duke	No. 1	Polo Grounds; New York, NY	W 19–0	59,031	
November 2	West Virginia	No. 1	Michie Stadium; West Point, NY	W 19–0	25,000	
November 9	vs. No. 2 Notre Dame	No. 1	Yankee Stadium; Bronx, NY (rivalry)	T 0–0	74,121	
November 16	at No. 5 Penn	No. 1	Franklin Field; Philadelphia, PA	W 34–7	78,000	
November 30	vs. Navy	No. 1	Philadelphia Municipal Stadium; Philadelphia, PA (Army–Navy Game)	W 21–18	102,000	
Rankings from AP Poll released prior to the game; Source:

== Rankings ==
Ranking movements Legend: ██ Increase in ranking ██ Decrease in ranking ( ) = First-place votes
	Week								
Poll	1	2	3	4	5	6	7	8	Final
AP	2 (21⅓)	1 (63)	1 (112¼)	1 (104)	1 (64)	1 (75)	1 (58)	1 (72)	2 (52½)

== Personnel ==
=== Players ===
- Shelton Biles, tackle
- Doc Blanchard (College Football Hall of Fame), fullback, Bishopville, South Carolina, 6', 208 pounds
- Glenn Davis (College Football Hall of Fame), Claremont, California, 5'9", 170 pounds
- Hank Foldberg, end, Dallas, Texas, 6'1", 195 pounds
- Herschel E. Fuson, Middlesburg, Kentucky, 6'1", 215 pounds
- Arthur L. Gerometta, guard, Gary, Indiana, 5'10", 190 pounds
- Dick Pitzer, end, Connellsville, Pennsylvania, 6'1", 195 pounds
- Barney Poole (College Football Hall of Fame), end, Gloster, Mississippi
- Arnold Tucker (College Football Hall of Fame), quarterback, Miami, Florida, 5'9", 175 pounds
- Bill Yeoman (College Football Hall of Fame), center, Elnora, Indiana, 6'2", 200 pounds

=== Coaches ===
- Earl Blaik (College Football Hall of Fame), head coach
- Paul Amen, assistant coach
- Andy Gustafson (College Football Hall of Fame), backfield coach
- Herman Hickman (College Football Hall of Fame), line coach
- Stu Holcomb, assistant coach
- Harvey Jablonsky (College Football Hall of Fame), assistant coach
- Bill Bevan, trainer

== Awards and honors ==
- Glenn Davis, Heisman Trophy
- Y. Arnold Tucker, James E. Sullivan Award

== NFL draft ==
The 1947 NFL draft was held on December 16, 1946. The following Cadets were selected.

Player	Position	Round	Pick	NFL club
Glenn Davis	Halfback	1	2	Detroit Lions
Hank Foldberg	End	5	28	Washington Redskins
Arnold Tucker	Quarterback	10	85	Chicago Bears
Herschel "UG" Fuson	Fullback	14	124	New York Giants
Dick Pitzer	Wide receiver	29	269	Pittsburgh Steelers
