= 1946 All-Eastern football team =

American all-star college football team

The 1946 All-Eastern football team consists of American football players chosen at the end of the 1946 college football season as the best at each position from teams playing college football at schools in the Eastern United States. The organizations selecting All-Eastern teams in 1946 included the Associated Press (AP) and the International News Service (INS).

== All-Eastern selections ==
=== Backs ===
- Arnold Tucker, Army (AP-1; INS-1 [qb])
- Glenn Davis, Army (AP-1, INS-1 [hb])
- Skip Minisi, Penn (AP-1)
- Doc Blanchard, Army (AP-1; INS-1 [rb])
- Levi Jackson, Yale (AP-2, INS-1 [hb])
- Lou Kusserow, Columbia (AP-2)
- Joe Watts, Syracuse (AP-2)
- Don Panciera, Boston College (AP-2, INS-2 [qb])
- Maderak, Penn State (INS-2 [hb])
- Kuleles, Boston College (INS-2 [hb])
- Mandarino, Syracuse (INS-2 [hb])

=== Ends ===
- Hank Foldberg, Army (AP-1, INS-1)
- Bill Swiacki, Columbia (AP-1; INS-1)
- George Poole, Army (AP-2)
- James Dieckelman, Holy Cross (AP-2)
- Irving Mondschein, NYU (INS-2)
- Monahan, Dartmouth (INS-2)

=== Tackles ===
- Frank Wydo, Cornell (AP-1, INS-1)
- Bernie Gallagher, Penn (AP-1)
- Jim Carrington, Navy (INS-1)
- James Lalikos, Brown (AP-2)
- Goble Bryant, Army (AP-2)
- Furman, Cornell (INS-2)
- Bill Schuler, Yale (INS-2)

=== Guards ===
- Emil Drvaric, Harvard (AP-1)
- Fritz Barzilauskas, Yale (AP-1, INS-1)
- Joe Steffy, Army (INS-1)
- Arthur Gerometta, Army (AP-2)
- Robert Rutkowski, Penn (AP-2)
- McClellan, Brown (INS-2)
- Robert Orlando, Colgate (INS-2)

=== Centers ===
- Chuck Bednarik, Penn (AP-1, INS-1)
- Richard Scott, Navy (AP-2)
- Fisher, Harvard (INS-2)

== Key ==
AP = Associated Press

INS = International News Service

== See also ==
- 1946 College Football All-America Team
