= Hank Foldberg =

American football player and coach (1923–2001)

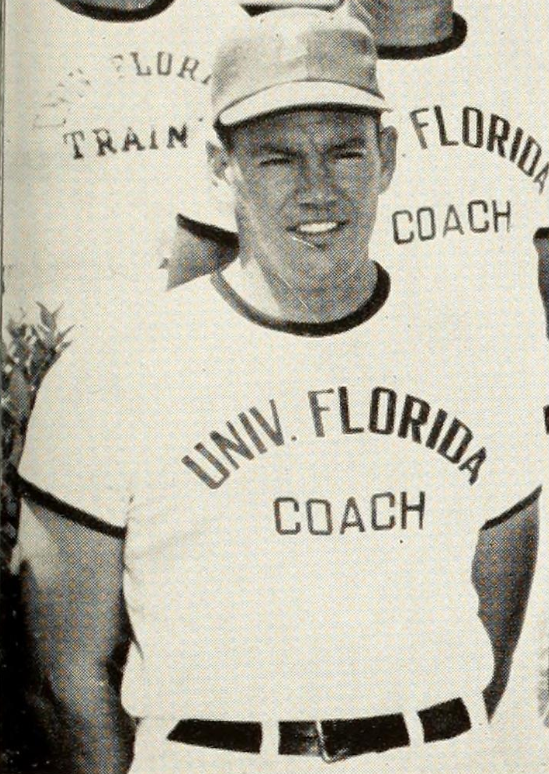
- Foldberg, c. 1956

No. 52, 50
- Position: End

Personal information
- Born: March 12, 1923; Dallas, Texas, U.S.
- Died: March 6, 2001 (aged 77); Bella Vista, Arkansas, U.S.
- Listed height: 6 ft 2 in (1.88 m)
- Listed weight: 205 lb (93 kg)

Career information
- High school: Sunset (Dallas)
- College: Texas A&M (1941-1942); Army (1945-1946)
- NFL draft: 1947: 5th round, 28th overall pick

Career history

Playing
- Brooklyn Dodgers (1948); Chicago Hornets (1949)

Coaching
- Purdue (1950) Assistant coach; Texas A&M (1951) Assistant coach; Florida (1952-1959) Assistant/line coach; Wichita (1960-1961) Head coach; Texas A&M (1962-1964) Head coach

Operations
- Texas A&M (1962-1965)

Awards and highlights
- 2× MVC champion (1960, 1961); Consensus All-American (1946); First-team All-American (1945); 2× First-team All-Eastern (1945, 1946)

Career AAFC statistics
- Receptions: 31
- Receiving yards: 331
- Total touchdowns: 1
- Stats at Pro Football Reference

Head coaching record
- Regular season: 22–28–1 (.441)

Henry Christian Foldberg Sr. (March 12, 1923 – March 7, 2001) was an American college and professional football player who became a college football coach. Foldberg played college football for Texas A&M University and the United States Military Academy, and thereafter, he played professionally for Brooklyn Dodgers and the Chicago Hornets of the All-America Football Conference (AAFC). He later served as the head football coach of Wichita State University and Texas A&M University.

== Early life ==
Foldberg was born in Dallas, Texas, and graduated from Sunset High School.

== College career ==
Foldberg attended Texas A&M University in College Station, Texas, where he played for the Texas A&M Aggies football team for a single season in 1942. He received an appointment to the United States Military Academy at West Point, New York, and played end for coach Earl Blaik's Army Cadets football team from 1944 to 1946. Army produced back-to-back undefeated 9–0 records in 1944 and 1945, and the Cadets were recognized as the Associated Press national champions following both seasons. As a senior in 1946, Army was again undefeated at 9–0–1, and Foldberg was recognized as a consensus first-team All-American at end. As a cadet athlete, he also earned varsity letters in lacrosse and baseball.

Foldberg resigned from the U.S. Military Academy in 1948, a year short of graduation, citing family financial hardship.

== Professional career ==
The Washington Redskins of the National Football League (NFL) drafted Foldberg in the fifth round (28th overall) in the 1947 NFL draft, but he decided to remain in school at West Point for another year. He played professional football in 1948 and 1949, first with Branch Rickey's Brooklyn Dodgers of the AAFC in 1948, and then with the AAFC's Chicago Hornets in 1949. In his two seasons as a pro, he played in 25 games, and started 15, while catching 31 passes for 331 yards.

Three teams from the AAFC merged into the NFL in 1950, and the AAFC ceased to exist thereafter.

== Coaching career ==
Foldberg's first coaching job was as an assistant with the Purdue Boilermakers of Purdue University in West Lafayette, Indiana. The following year, he returned to College Station, Texas to become a Texas A&M Aggies assistant. One of Foldberg's former assistant coaches from Army's 1944 and 1945 national championship teams, Bob Woodruff, became the head coach for the Florida Gators football team of the University of Florida, and invited Foldberg to join the Gators coaching staff in 1952. Foldberg remained one of Woodruff's principal assistants through the 1959 season. Among other duties, Foldberg served as the Gators line coach.

From 1960 to 1961, Foldberg served as the head football coach at the University of Wichita (now Wichita State University) in Wichita, Kansas, where his Wichita Shockers teams compiled a 16–5 record in two seasons, and won two consecutive Missouri Valley Conference championships. After the 1961 regular season, he accepted an offer to become the head football coach and athletic director at Texas A&M University, telling his Wichita Shockers players that it was the only job for which he would leave Wichita. He had previously turned down an offer from the University of Nebraska to coach the Nebraska Cornhuskers football team. Foldberg's 1961 Shockers were defeated 17–9 by the Villanova Wildcats in the Sun Bowl.

Foldberg coached the Texas A&M Aggies football team for three seasons from 1962 to 1964. He inherited an Aggies program that had not had a winning season since former Aggies coach Bear Bryant left for the University of Alabama after the 1957 season. He was unable to duplicate his successful turnaround of the Wichita Shockers program, compiled an overall record of 6–23–1 as the Aggies head coach, and was replaced by Gene Stallings after the 1965 season. He resigned as the Aggies' athletic director in July 1965.

== Life after football ==
Folberg was married to the former Margaret Smith, and they had a son and a daughter. After he left the coaching profession, he entered the real estate business in Arkansas. Foldberg's son, Hank Foldberg, Jr., later played tight end for the Florida Gators football team from 1971 to 1973.

Foldberg died at his home in Bella Vista, Arkansas; he was 77 years old.

== Head coaching record ==
Year	Team	Overall	Conference	Standing	Bowl/playoffs
Wichita Shockers (Missouri Valley Conference) (1960–1961)
1960	Wichita	8–2	3–0	1st	
1961	Wichita	8–3	3–0	1st	L Sun
Wichita:		16–5	6–0		
Texas A&M Aggies (Southwest Conference) (1962–1964)
1962	Texas A&M	3–7	3–4	T–4th	
1963	Texas A&M	2–7–1	1–5–1	8th	
1964	Texas A&M	1–9	1–6	7th	
Texas A&M:		6–23–1	5–15–1		
Total:		22–28–1			
National championship Conference title Conference division title or championship game berth

== See also ==
- List of United States Military Academy alumni
