= Frank Wydo =

American football player (1924–1979)

No. 79, 75, 74
- Positions: Tackle, defensive tackle

Personal information
- Born: June 15, 1924; Footedale, Pennsylvania, U.S.
- Died: February 17, 1979 (aged 54); Uniontown, Pennsylvania, U.S.
- Listed height: 6 ft 4 in (1.93 m)
- Listed weight: 225 lb (102 kg)

Career information
- College: Duquesne; Cornell
- NFL draft: 1947: 5th round, 29th overall pick

Career history
- Pittsburgh Steelers (1947–1951); Philadelphia Eagles (1952–1957); Boston Patriots (1960)*
- * Offseason or practice squad member only

Awards and highlights
- Third-team All-American (1946); First-team All-Eastern (1946)

Career NFL statistics
- Games played: 132
- Games started: 112
- Fumble recoveries: 10
- Stats at Pro Football Reference

Frank Wydo (June 15, 1924 – February 17, 1979) was an American professional football tackle who played eleven seasons in the National Football League (NFL) for the Pittsburgh Steelers and the Philadelphia Eagles.
