= Arnold Tucker =

American football player and Air Force officer (1924–2019)

No. 17
- Position: Quarterback

Personal information
- Born: January 5, 1924; Calhoun Falls, South Carolina, U.S.
- Died: January 10, 2019 (aged 95); Miami, Florida, U.S.

Career information
- College: Army
- NFL draft: 1947: 10th round, 85 (By the Chicago Bears)th overall pick

Awards and highlights
- 2× National champion (1944, 1945); 2× First-team All-American (1945, 1946); James E. Sullivan Award (1946); First-team All-Eastern (1946)
- College Football Hall of Fame

Young Arnold Tucker (January 5, 1924 – January 10, 2019) was a United States Air Force officer who graduated from the United States Military Academy at West Point, New York in 1947.

== Football career ==
While lettering twice in football, Tucker was a part of three national championship squads (1944, 1945, 1946) on the gridiron. He earned first team all-America honors in 1946 after garnering second team laurels in 1945. After serving as Army's starting quarterback in 1945 and 1946, Tucker finished fifth in the 1946 Heisman Trophy balloting in 1946, behind teammates Glenn Davis and Felix "Doc" Blanchard among others.

During his two years as a starter, Tucker guided the Black Knights to a combined 18–0–1 record, while Army went 27–0–1 during his three years as a team member. Tucker passed for 618 yards and nine touchdowns in 1946 and also registered a school-record eight interceptions as a defensive back that year. He still shares the single-season Academy record for interceptions and stands second on Army's career list with 11. Tucker, who was selected to participate in the 1947 College All-star Game played in Chicago, also returned punts and kickoffs for the Black Knights.

Tucker lettered twice and served as team captain during his senior year on the basketball team.

A former University of Miami and Army star, Tucker played at Miami High in his youth. He won the James E. Sullivan Award as the nation's best amateur athlete in 1947 and was elected to the College Football Hall of Fame in 2008.

== Personal life and death ==
Young Arnold Tucker was born in Calhoun Falls, South Carolina. During a 29-year career the Army and Air Force, he served during the Korean War, among other capacities, and retired as a lieutenant colonel in 1976. He was married to Patricia Small from 1947 until her death in 1998, and they had two a daughter and son; his son predeceased him in 2014.

Tucker, a resident of Palmetto Bay, Florida, died in Miami on January 10, 2019, at the age of 95. Aside from a paid death notice from his family, and a passing mention in an Associated Press retrospective of notable athletes who died in 2019, his death was not widely reported until The New York Times published an obituary in 2022.
