= 1946 All-America college football team =

Official list of the best college football players of 1946

The 1946 All-America college football team is composed of college football players who were selected as All-Americans by various organizations and writers that chose All-America college football teams in 1946. The nine selectors recognized by the NCAA as "official" for the 1946 season are (1) the All-America Board (AAB), (2) the American Football Coaches Association (AFCA), published by Look magazine, (3) the Associated Press (AP), (4) Collier's Weekly, as selected by Grantland Rice, (5) the Football Writers Association of America (FWAA), (6) the International News Service (INS), (7) the Newspaper Enterprise Association (NEA), (8) the Sporting News (SN), and (9) the United Press (UP).

== Consensus All-Americans ==
For the year 1946, the NCAA recognizes nine published All-American teams as "official" designations for purposes of its consensus determinations. The following chart identifies the NCAA-recognized consensus All-Americans and displays which first-team designations they received.

Name	Position	School	Number	Official selectors	Other selectors
Burr Baldwin	End	UCLA	9/9	AAB, AFCA, AP, CO, FWAA, INS, NEA, SN, UP	CP, WC
Johnny Lujack	Quarterback	Notre Dame	9/9	AAB, AFCA, AP, CO [tie], FWAA, INS, NEA, SN, UP	CP, WC
Charley Trippi	Halfback	Georgia	9/9	AAB, AFCA, AP, CO, FWAA, INS, NEA, SN, UP	CP, WC
Glenn Davis	Halfback	Army	9/9	AAB, AFCA, AP, CO, FWAA, INS, NEA, SN, UP	CP, WC
Doc Blanchard	Fullback	Army	9/9	AAB, AFCA, AP, CO, FWAA, INS, NEA, SN, UP	CP, WC
George Connor	Tackle	Notre Dame	8/9	AAB, AFCA, AP, CO, INS, NEA, SN, UP	CP, WC
Alex Agase	Guard	Illinois	8/9	AAB, AFCA, AP, INS, NEA, SN, UP, CP	WC
Weldon Humble	Guard	Rice	7/9	AAB, AFCA, AP, CO, FWAA, NEA, UP	WC
Paul Duke	Center	Georgia Tech	6/9	AAB, AFCA, AP, CO, NEA, UP	CP, WC
Dick Huffman	Tackle	Tennessee	5/9	AAB, AFCA, AP, CO, FWAA	WC
Warren Amling	Tackle	Ohio State	5/9	FWAA [g], INS, NEA, SN, UP	CP
Hub Bechtol	End	Texas	4/9	AAB, AFCA, FWAA, SN	WC
Hank Foldberg	End	Army	4/9	CO, INS, NEA, UP	--

== All-American selections for 1946 ==
=== Ends ===
- Burr Baldwin, UCLA (AAB, AFCA, AP-1, CO, FWAA, INS-1, NEA-1, SN, UP-1, CP-1, WC)
- Hub Bechtol, Texas (AAB, AFCA, FWAA, NEA-2, SN, UP-2, WC)
- Hank Foldberg, Army (AP-3, CO, INS-1, NEA-1, UP-1, CP-2)
- Elmer Madar, Michigan (AP-1, INS-2, CP-3)
- Al Baldwin, Arkansas (AP-2)
- Richard Hagen, Washington (AP-2)
- Barney Poole, Army (NEA-2, UP-2)
- Wallace Jones, Kentucky (INS-2, CP-2)
- Ray Poole, Mississippi (AP-3)
- Len Ford, Michigan (NEA-3)
- Browning, Denver (NEA-3)
- Clyde Lindsey, LSU (CP-2)
- Ike Armstrong, Oklahoma A&M (CP-3)

=== Tackles ===
- George Connor, Notre Dame (AAB, AFCA, AP-1, CO, INS-1, NEA-1, SN, UP-1, CP-1, WC)
- Dick Huffman, Tennessee (AAB, AFCA, AP-1, CO, FWAA, INS-2, NEA-2, UP-2, CP-2, WC)
- Warren Amling, Ohio State (AP-2, FWAA [g], INS-1, NEA-1, SN, UP-1, CP-1)
- George Savitsky, Penn (FWAA, NEA-3, UP-2)
- John Ferraro, USC (AP-2, INS-2, CP-3)
- Bob Davis, Georgia Tech (NEA-2)
- Bernie Gallagher, Penn (AP-3, CP-2)
- Frank Wydo, Cornell (AP-3)
- Walt Barnes, LSU (NEA-3)
- Bill Kay, Iowa (CP-3)

=== Guards ===
- Weldon Humble, Rice (AAB, AFCA, AP-1, CO, FWAA, INS-2, NEA-1, UP-1, CP-3, WC)
- Alex Agase, Illinois (AAB, AFCA, AP-1, INS-1, NEA-1, SN, UP-1, CP-1, WC)
- John Mastrangelo, Notre Dame (AP-2, CO, INS-1, NEA-3, SN, UP-2, CP-3)
- Ed Hirsch, Northwestern (CP-1)
- Plato Andros, Oklahoma (AP-2, INS-2, NEA-3)
- Joe Steffy, Army (NEA-2, UP-2)
- Arthur Gerometta, Army (NEA-2)
- Knox Ramsey, William & Mary (AP-3)
- Herbert St. John, Georgia (AP-3)
- Dick Barwegan, Purdue (CP-2)
- Fritz Barzilauskas, Yale (CP-2)

=== Centers ===
- Paul Duke, Georgia Tech (AAB, AFCA, AP-1, CO, NEA-1, UP-1, CP-1, WC)
- George Strohmeyer, Notre Dame (AP-3, FWAA, INS-1, NEA-2, SN, UP-2)
- Bryant Meeks, South Carolina (AP-2)
- Chuck Bednarik, Penn (INS-2)
- Dick Harris, Texas (NEA-3)
- John Cannady, Indiana (CP-2)
- Dick Scott, Navy (CP-3)

=== Quarterbacks ===
- Johnny Lujack, Notre Dame (College Football Hall of Fame) (AAB, AFCA, AP-1, CO [tie], FWAA, INS-1, NEA-1, SN, UP-1, CP-1, WC)
- Arnold Tucker, Army (AP-3, CO [tie], INS-2, NEA-2, UP-2, CP-2)
- Ben Raimondi, Indiana (AP-2)
- Ernie Case, UCLA (AP-2, CP-3)
- Bobby Layne, Texas (AP-2, INS-2, NEA-3 [fullback], UP-2 [fullback], CP-2)
- Mickey McCardle, USC (NEA-3)

=== Halfbacks ===
- Charley Trippi, Georgia (AAB, AFCA, AP-1, CO, FWAA, INS-1, NEA-1, SN, UP-1, CP-1, WC)
- Glenn Davis, Army (AAB, AFCA, AP-1, CO, FWAA, INS-1, NEA-1, SN, UP-1, CP-1, WC)
- Herman Wedemeyer, St. Mary's (AP-2, INS-2, NEA-2, UP-2, CP-2)
- Ray Evans, Kansas (AP-3)
- Charlie Justice, North Carolina (AP-3, NEA-2, UP-2)
- Bob Chappuis, Michigan (INS-2, CP-3)
- Clyde Scott, Arkansas (NEA-2)
- Harry Gilmer, Alabama (AP-3, NEA-3, CP-2)
- Forrest Hall, U. San Francisco (NEA-3)
- Tony Minisi, Penn (CP-3)
- Lloyd Merriman, Stanford (CP-3)

=== Fullbacks ===
- Felix Blanchard, Army (AAB, AFCA, AP-1, CO, FWAA, INS-1, NEA-1, SN, UP-1 CP-1, WC)

== Black college All-Americans ==
During the 1940s, African-Americans were excluded from many college football programs. Many played the game at historically black colleges and universities (HBCUs). The major All-America selectors in these years did not include players from HBCUs. However, The Pittsburgh Courier each year selected its own All-America team from African-American players, including those at HBCUs. The players chosen for 1946 were:

- Nathaniel Powell, Florida A&M, end
- Roger Pierce, Langston, end
- Robert Drummond, Tennessee A&I, tackle
- Robert Smith, Southern, tackle
- French Nickens, Virginia State, guard
- Herman Mabrie, Tuskegee, guard
- John Brown, North Carolina College, center
- Nathaniel Taylor, Tennessee A&I, back
- Whitney L. Van Cleve, Tuskegee, back
- Raymond Von Lewis, Texas College, back
- James Turpin, Morgan State, back

== Key ==
- **Bold** – Consensus All-American
- -1 – First-team selection
- -2 – Second-team selection
- -3 – Third-team selection

=== Official selectors ===
- AAB = All-America Board
- AFCA = American Football Coaches Association, selected for the Saturday Evening Post
- AP = Associated Press
- CO = Collier's Weekly
- FWAA = Football Writers Association of America
- INS = International News Service
- NEA = Newspaper Enterprise Association
- SN = Sporting News
- UP = United Press

=== Other selectors ===
- CP = Central Press Association, selected by college football captains
- WC = Walter Camp Football Foundation

== See also ==
- 1946 All-Big Six Conference football team
- 1946 All-Big Ten Conference football team
- 1946 All-Pacific Coast Conference football team
- 1946 All-SEC football team
- 1946 All-Southern Conference football team
- 1946 All-Southwest Conference football team
