= 1946 Notre Dame Fighting Irish football team =

American college football season

1946 Notre Dame Fighting Irish football

AP Poll national champion
- Conference: Independent

Ranking
- AP: No. 1
- Record: 8–0–1
- Head coach: Frank Leahy (4th season)
- Offensive scheme: T formation
- Captain: Game captains
- Home stadium: Notre Dame Stadium

1946 Midwestern major college football independents records
	Conf.			Overall
Team	W	L	T	W		L		T
No. 1 Notre Dame		–		8	–	0	–	1
Cincinnati		–		9	–	2	–	0
Detroit		–		6	–	4	–	0
Michigan State		–		5	–	5	–	0
Marquette		–		4	–	5	–	0
Rankings from AP Poll

The 1946 Notre Dame Fighting Irish football team was an American football team that represented the University of Notre Dame as an independent during the 1946 college football season. In their fourth year under head coach Frank Leahy, the Irish compiled an 8–0–1 and were ranked No. 1 in the final AP Poll. The season also produced the 1946 Army vs. Notre Dame football game, a scoreless tie between undefeated teams ranked No. 1 and No. 2.

The 1946 Notre Dame team dominated both on defense and offense, ranking first nationally in total offense (441.3 yards per game), rushing offense (340.1 yards per game), and total defense (allowing 141.7 yards per game). Despite ranking as the nation's top rushing offense, no Notre Dame player ranked among the national rushing leaders, as multiple backs shared the rushing load, including Emil Sitko (54 carries, 346 yards), Terry Brennan (74 carries, 329 yards), Jim Mello (61 carries, 307 yards), Bill Gompers (51 carries, 279 yards), and John Panelli (58 carries, 265 yards).

Two Notre Dame players, quarterback Johnny Lujack and tackle George Connor, were consensus first-team picks for the 1946 All-America college football team. Center George Strohmeyer and guard John Mastrangelo also received first-team All-America honors from multiple selectors.

From 1946 to 1949, Notre Dame compiled a 36–0–2 record and claims three national championships. Sports Illustrated rated these Notre Dame teams as the second best sports dynasty (professional or collegiate) of the 20th century and second greatest college football dynasty.

== Schedule ==
Date	Opponent	Rank	Site	Result	Attendance	Source
September 28	at Illinois		Memorial Stadium; Champaign, IL	W 26–6	75,119	
October 5	Pittsburgh		Notre Dame Stadium; Notre Dame, IN (rivalry)	W 33–0	50,368	
October 12	Purdue	No. 3	Notre Dame Stadium; Notre Dame, IN (rivalry)	W 49–6	55,452	
October 26	at No. 17 Iowa	No. 2	Iowa Stadium; Iowa City, IA	W 41–6	52,311	
November 2	vs. Navy	No. 2	Municipal Stadium; Baltimore, MD (rivalry)	W 28–0	65,000	
November 9	vs. No. 1 Army	No. 2	Yankee Stadium; Bronx, NY (rivalry)	T 0–0	74,121	
November 16	Northwestern	No. 2	Notre Dame Stadium; Notre Dame, IN (rivalry)	W 27–0	58,000	
November 23	at Tulane	No. 2	Tulane Stadium; New Orleans, LA	W 41–0	65,841	
November 30	No. 16 USC	No. 2	Notre Dame Stadium; Notre Dame, IN (rivalry)	W 26–6	56,000	
Rankings from AP Poll released prior to the game

== Rankings ==
Ranking movements Legend: ██ Increase in ranking ██ Decrease in ranking ( ) = First-place votes
	Week								
Poll	1	2	3	4	5	6	7	8	Final
AP	3 (15⅓)	2 (31)	2 (21¼)	2 (61)	2 (51)	2 (49)	2 (16)	2 (38)	1 (104½)

== Post-season ==
=== Award winners ===
- George Connor – Outland Trophy

All-Americans
Name	AP	UP	NEA	INS	COL	AA	SN	L	FC
† John Lujack, QB	1	1	1	1	1	1	1	1	1
‡ George Connor, T	1	1	1	1	1	1	1	2	1
John Monstrangelo, G	2	2		1	1		1		
George Strohmeyer, C		2		1			1	1	3
† denotes unanimous selection ‡denotes consensus selection

College Football Hall of Fame Inductees
Name	Position	Year Inducted
George Connor	Tackle	1963
Zygmont "Ziggy" Czarobski	Tackle	1977
Bill Fischer	Tackle/Guard	1983
Leon Hart	End	1973
Frank Leahy	Coach	1970
Johnny Lujack	Quarterback	1960
Jim Martin	End/Tackle	1995
Emil "Red" Sitko	Halfback/Fullback	1984

Notre Dame leads all universities in players inducted.

=== 1947 NFL draft ===
The 1947 NFL Draft was held on December 16, 1946. The following Fighting Irish were selected.

Round	Pick	Player	Position	NFL Club
3	16	John Mastrangelo	Tackle	Pittsburgh Steelers
6	37	George Sullivan	End	Boston Yanks
13	111	Bob Skoglund	Defensive end	Green Bay Packers
15	134	John Fallon	Tackle	New York Giants
27	250	Bob Palladino	Back	Green Bay Packers
