= Army–Notre Dame football rivalry =

American college football rivalry

- Army Black Knights Notre Dame Fighting Irish
- First meeting: November 1, 1913; Notre Dame, 35–13
- Latest meeting: November 23, 2024; Notre Dame, 49–14
- Next meeting: TBD

Statistics
- Total meetings: 52
- All-time series: Notre Dame leads, 40–8–4
- Largest victory: Army, 59–0 (1944); Notre Dame, 62–3 (1973)
- Longest win streak: Notre Dame, 16 (1965–present)
- Current win streak: Notre Dame, 16 (1965–present)

Locations of Army and Notre Dame

The Army–Notre Dame football rivalry is an American college football rivalry between the Army Black Knights football team of the United States Military Academy and Notre Dame Fighting Irish football team of the University of Notre Dame. The rivalry dates back to 1913, when both teams were among the top college football programs in the United States.

== Series history ==
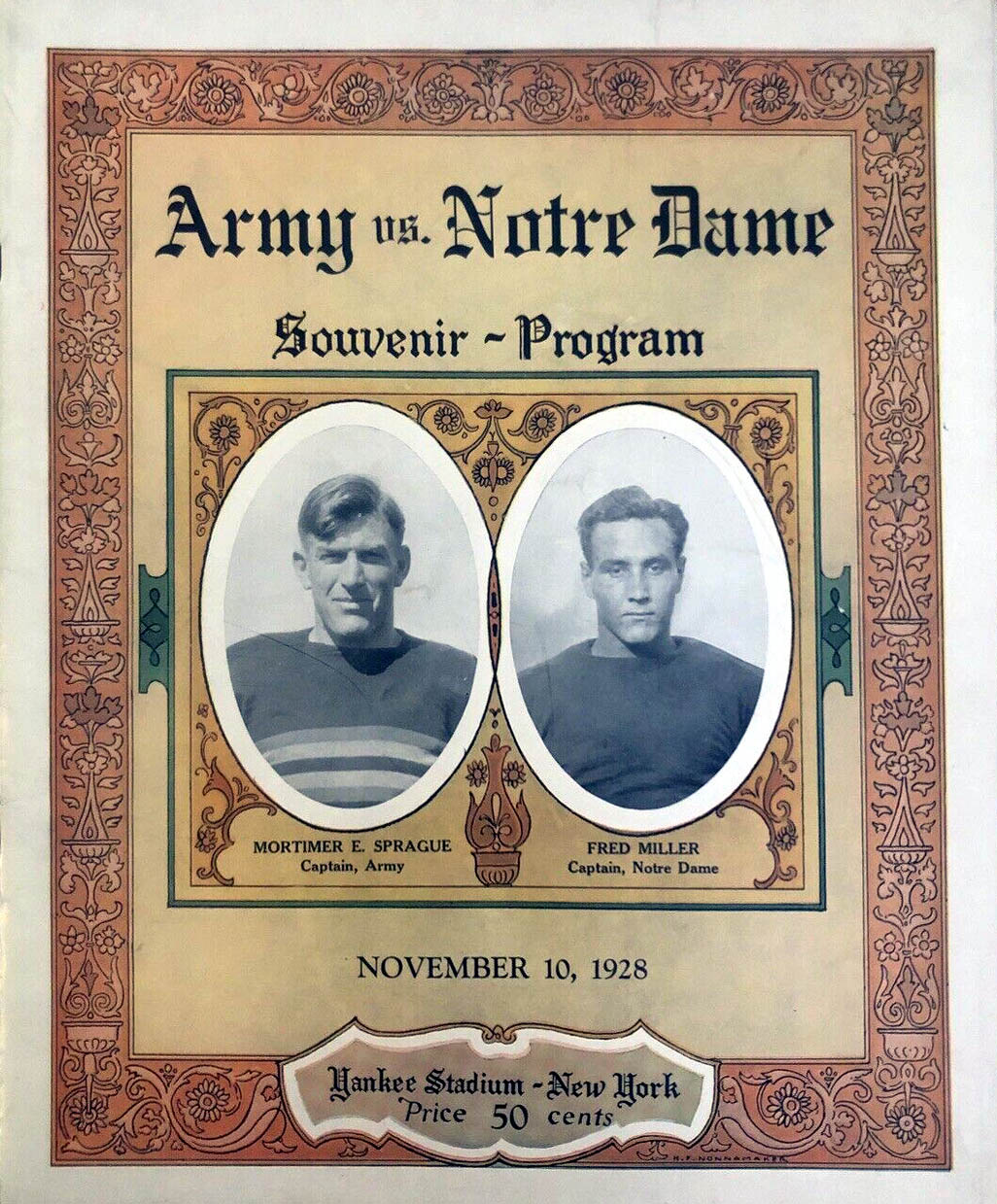
Program for the 1928 Army v Notre Dame game at Yankee Stadium

The first Army–Notre Dame game in 1913 is generally regarded as the game that established the national reputation of the Fighting Irish. In that game, Notre Dame revolutionized the forward pass in a stunning 35–13 victory. For years it was "The Game" on Notre Dame's schedule, played at Yankee Stadium in New York. During the 1940s, the rivalry with the Army Cadets reached its zenith. This was because both teams were extremely successful and met several times in key games (including one of the Games of the Century, a scoreless tie in 1946). In 1944, the Cadets administered the worst defeat in Notre Dame football history, crushing the Fighting Irish 59–0. The following year, it was more of the same, a 48–0 blitzkrieg. After meeting every year since 1919, the series went on a ten-year hiatus starting in 1947 and lasting until 1957. The game was played in South Bend for the first time and the Fighting Irish won 27–7. Since then, there have been infrequent meetings over the past several decades, and Army's last win was 68 years ago in 1958.

Like Navy, due to the small capacity of Army's Michie Stadium, the Cadets played their home games at a neutral site, which for a number of years was Yankee Stadium and before that, the Polo Grounds. In 1957, the game was played in Philadelphia's Municipal (later John F. Kennedy Memorial) Stadium while in 1965, the teams met at the year-old Shea Stadium in Queens. They last met at the original Yankee Stadium in 1969; it was played at West Point in 1973, and the Fighting Irish rolled 62–3 on their way to the national championship. In more recent times, games in which Army was the host have been played at Giants Stadium in East Rutherford, New Jersey. Notre Dame leads the series 40–8–4 (.808). One of their latest matchups came in 2016, when the teams met for the 2016 Shamrock Series in the Alamodome in San Antonio; Notre Dame won easily, 44–6, and the Irish have won the last sixteen, the longest streak in the rivalry's history.

The 2024 Shamrock Series meeting at the new Yankee Stadium commemorated the Notre Dame's Four Horsemen backfield that led them to an upset win over Army at the Polo Grounds in 1924. Notre Dame wore special blue-gray uniforms, a nod to the blue-gray sky mentioned in Grantland Rice's 1924 "Four Horsemen" dispatch. Notre Dame again won easily, 49–14.

=== The 1944 game ===
It had been thirteen years since Army had beaten Notre Dame. In fact, the last time Army had scored against the Irish was in 1938. The Irish were the defending national champions, but lost many key players to graduation and the armed services. The Irish even lost head coach Frank Leahy to military service, and were now being led by Ed McKeever.

Notre Dame went into the game 5–1 and ranked #5, coming off a 32–13 loss to Navy. The Army squad was being led by Glenn Davis and Doc Blanchard. The Cadets also had a quarterback named Doug Kenna, and a transfer from the University of Texas, sprinter Max Minor.

Army overwhelmed the Irish. Kenna opened the scoring with a run for touchdown. He wasn't done, as he played defense as well, intercepting an Irish pass, which led to a scoring run by Minor. Kenna then pulled a trifecta of sorts, when he passed for a third score. Davis, a late scratch as a starter, also intercepted a pass, and had two offensive runs for scores. By halftime, Army had a commanding 33–0 lead.

Kenna added another scoring pass, and Davis another run for a score. Even Army's back-ups got into the act. Harold Tavzel, a second string tackle, intercepted a poorly thrown pass from the Irish quarterback, and jogged a few yards for a score. When the game was over, Army won 59–0, handing the Irish the worst loss in the program's history. The Irish would recover, winning their last three games to finish 8–2 and ranked #9 in the nation.

When asked by a reporter about the score, Army halfback Doc Blanchard said "If there was anyone to blame for the size of the margin, it was Notre Dame, which fired our desire to win with its long humiliation of Army teams."

== Game results ==
Army victories	Notre Dame victories	Tie games

No.	Date	Location	Winner	Score
1	November 1, 1913	West Point, NY	Notre Dame	35–13
2	November 7, 1914	West Point, NY	Army	20–7
3	November 6, 1915	West Point, NY	Notre Dame	7–0
4	November 4, 1916	West Point, NY	Army	30–10
5	November 3, 1917	West Point, NY	Notre Dame	7–2
6	November 8, 1919	West Point, NY	Notre Dame	12–9
7	October 30, 1920	West Point, NY	Notre Dame	27–17
8	November 5, 1921	West Point, NY	Notre Dame	28–0
9	November 11, 1922	West Point, NY	Tie	0–0
10	October 13, 1923	Brooklyn, NY	Notre Dame	13–0
11	October 18, 1924	New York, NY	Notre Dame	13–7
12	October 17, 1925	Bronx, NY	Army	27–0
13	November 13, 1926	Bronx, NY	Notre Dame	7–0
14	November 12, 1927	Bronx, NY	Army	18–0
15	November 10, 1928	Bronx, NY	Notre Dame	12–6
16	November 30, 1929	Bronx, NY	Notre Dame	7–0
17	November 29, 1930	Chicago, IL	Notre Dame	7–6
18	November 28, 1931	Bronx, NY	Army	12–0
19	November 26, 1932	Bronx, NY	Notre Dame	21–0
20	December 2, 1933	Bronx, NY	Notre Dame	13–12
21	November 24, 1934	Bronx, NY	Notre Dame	12–6
22	November 16, 1935	Bronx, NY	Tie	6–6
23	November 14, 1936	Bronx, NY	Notre Dame	20–6
24	November 13, 1937	Bronx, NY	#18 Notre Dame	7–0
25	October 29, 1938	Bronx, NY	#7 Notre Dame	19–7
26	November 4, 1939	Bronx, NY	#4 Notre Dame	14–0
27	November 2, 1940	Bronx, NY	#2 Notre Dame	7–0

No.	Date	Location	Winner	Score
28	November 1, 1941	Bronx, NY	Tie	0–0
29	November 7, 1942	Bronx, NY	#4 Notre Dame	13–0
30	November 6, 1943	Bronx, NY	#1 Notre Dame	26–0
31	November 11, 1944	Bronx, NY	#1 Army	59–0
32	November 10, 1945	Bronx, NY	#1 Army	48–0
33	November 9, 1946	Bronx, NY	Tie	0–0
34	November 8, 1947	South Bend, IN	#1 Notre Dame	27–7
35	October 12, 1957	Philadelphia, PA	#12 Notre Dame	23–21
36	October 11, 1958	South Bend, IN	#3 Army	14–2
37	October 9, 1965	Queens, NY	#7 Notre Dame	17–0
38	October 8, 1966	South Bend, IN	#3 Notre Dame	35–0
39	October 11, 1969	Bronx, NY	#15 Notre Dame	45–0
40	October 10, 1970	South Bend, IN	#3 Notre Dame	51–10
41	October 20, 1973	West Point, NY	#8 Notre Dame	62–3
42	October 19, 1974	South Bend, IN	#7 Notre Dame	48–0
43	October 15, 1977	East Rutherford, NJ	#11 Notre Dame	24–0
44	October 18, 1980	South Bend, IN	#5 Notre Dame	30–3
45	October 15, 1983	East Rutherford, NJ	Notre Dame	42–0
46	October 19, 1985	South Bend, IN	Notre Dame	24–10
47	October 14, 1995	East Rutherford, NJ	#17 Notre Dame	28–27
48	October 24, 1998	South Bend, IN	#18 Notre Dame	20–17
49	November 18, 2006	South Bend, IN	#6 Notre Dame	41–9
50	November 20, 2010	Bronx, NY	Notre Dame	27–3
51	November 12, 2016	San Antonio, TX	Notre Dame	44–6
52	November 23, 2024	Bronx, NY	#6 Notre Dame	49–14
Series: Notre Dame leads 40–8–4
One additional game was cancelled during World War I. Notre Dame was scheduled to play against Army at West Point on November 2, 1918.

=== Top-5 games ===
Since 1936, when the AP Poll began being released continuously, Army and the Fighting Irish have met 5 times when both have been ranked in the top 5. The first instance came in 1943, with the most recent in 1958. Army holds a 3–1–1 record in these top-5 meetings. The 1945 and 1946 games were the only times the teams were the top two in the rankings.

Year	Away team		Home team		Notes
1943	No. 1 Notre Dame	26	No. 3 Army	0	
1944	No. 5 Notre Dame	0	No. 1 Army	59	
1945	No. 2 Notre Dame	0	No. 1 Army	48	
1946	No. 2 Notre Dame	0	No. 1 Army	0	
1958	No. 3 Army	14	No. 4 Notre Dame	2	

== Venues ==
- The Plain, West Point, NY: 1913–1922 (10 times)
- Ebbets Field, Brooklyn, NY: 1923 (once)
- Polo Grounds, New York, NY: 1924 (once)
- Yankee Stadium (1923), Bronx, NY: 1925–29, 1931–1946, 1969 (22 times)
- Soldier Field, Chicago, IL: 1930 (once)
- Notre Dame Stadium, South Bend, IN: 1947, 1958, 1966, 1970, 1974, 1980, 1985, 1998, 2006 (9 times)
- Philadelphia Municipal Stadium, 1957 (once)
- Shea Stadium, Queens, NY: 1965 (once)
- Michie Stadium, West Point, NY: 1973 (once)
- Giants Stadium, East Rutherford, NJ: 1977, 1983, 1995 (thrice)
- Yankee Stadium (current), Bronx, NY: 2010, 2024
- Alamodome, San Antonio, TX: 2016

== See also ==
- List of NCAA college football rivalry games
