= Johnny Lujack =

American football player (1925–2023)

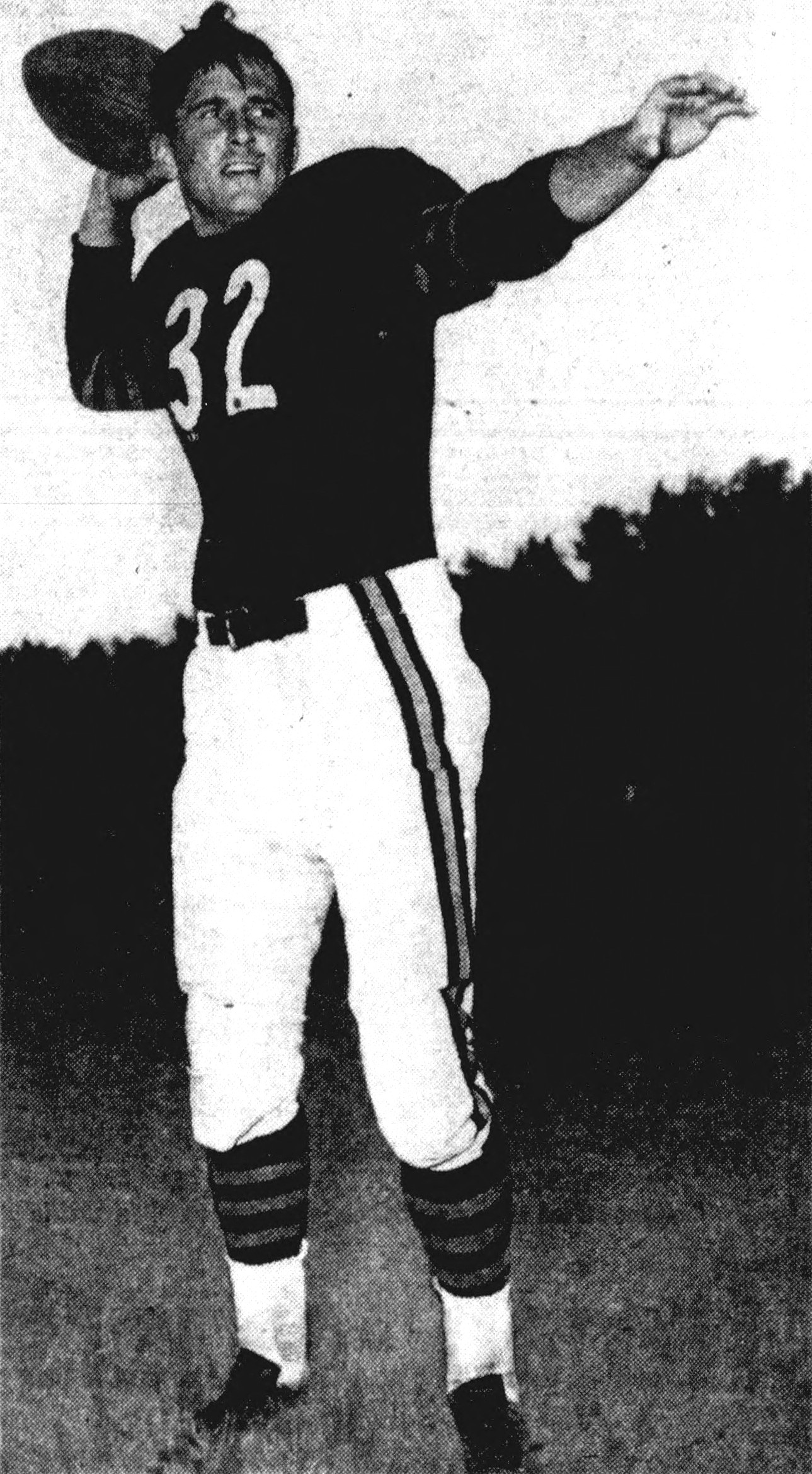
- Lujack c. 1950

No. 32
- Positions: Quarterback, safety

Personal information
- Born: January 4, 1925; Connellsville, Pennsylvania, U.S.
- Died: July 25, 2023 (aged 98); Naples, Florida, U.S.
- Listed height: 6 ft 0 in (1.83 m)
- Listed weight: 186 lb (84 kg)

Career information
- High school: Connellsville
- College: Notre Dame (1943; 1946–1947)
- NFL draft: 1946: 1st round, 4th overall pick

Career history

Playing
- Chicago Bears (1948–1951)

Coaching
- Notre Dame (1952–1953) Assistant coach

Awards and highlights
- First-team All-Pro (1950); 2× Pro Bowl (1950, 1951); NFL passing touchdowns leader (1949); NFL passing yards leader (1949); NFL rushing touchdowns leader (1950); 100 greatest Bears of All-Time; 3× National champion (1943, 1946, 1947); Heisman Trophy (1947); AP Athlete of the Year (1947); SN Player of the Year (1947); 2× Unanimous All-American (1946, 1947)

Career NFL statistics
- Passing attempts: 808
- Passing completions: 404
- Completion percentage: 50.0%
- TD–INT: 41–54
- Passing yards: 6,295
- Passer rating: 65.3
- Rushing yards: 742
- Rushing touchdowns: 21
- Interceptions: 12
- Interception yards: 190
- Stats at Pro Football Reference
- College Football Hall of Fame

John Christopher Lujack Jr. (/ˈluːdʒæk/; January 4, 1925 – July 25, 2023) was an American football player who was a quarterback and safety. He played college football for the Notre Dame Fighting Irish, winning the Heisman Trophy in 1947. He was also a unanimous All-American in both 1946 and 1947, leading the team to national championships both years. He later played professionally for the Chicago Bears of the National Football League (NFL) from 1948 to 1951, receiving first-team All-Pro honors in 1950.

== Early life ==
Lujack was born to Alice and John Luczak, in 1925 in Connellsville, Pennsylvania, the youngest of four sons and fifth child in a family of six children. The family is of Polish descent and included older siblings Valentine ("Val"), Stanislaus ("Stan"), Victoria, Aloysius ("Allie", who went on to play professional basketball), and younger sister Dolores. His father worked for the Pittsburgh and Lake Erie Railroad for thirty years as a boilermaker.

Lujack attended Connellsville High School and played for the school's football team from 1939 to 1941. He was also the senior class president and valedictorian. In high school, he lettered in four sports; baseball, football, basketball, and track.

Lujack's 1941 high school team, named the Cokers for workers in the coal milling industry who feed the ovens, went 8–0–1, but did not get to play for the WPIAL league championship because their last game, with Brownsville, ended in a 13–13 tie.

People in Connellsville had wanted Lujack to go to the United States Military Academy (Army) at West Point, going so far as to ask their local congressman for an appointment, but Lujack, a fan of Notre Dame football from listening to their radio broadcasts, had his heart set on playing in South Bend. He was the first Connellsville High School student to receive an appointment to Army.

== College career ==
Lujack attended the University of Notre Dame, where he was given a scholarship by Frank Leahy, from 1942 to 1943 and then 1946 to 1947. His career was interrupted for two years by World War II after his sophomore season, during which he served as an officer in the United States Navy. His time in the Navy was spent hunting German submarines in the English Channel as an ensign. In 1945, Johnny Lujack quarterbacked the Fort Pierce Amphibs, a military service football team based in Fort Pierce, Florida.

When Lujack returned from the Atlantic (ETO) duty, he appeared on the cover of the September 29, 1947, issue of LIFE. He led the 1947 Fighting Irish to a 9–0 record for his senior year, during which he completed 61 passes on 109 attempts for 777 yards and rushed for 139 yards on 12 carries, and won the Heisman Trophy. As he had in high school, Lujack once again received varsity letters (called "monograms") in four sports (again baseball, football, basketball, and track) while at Notre Dame, becoming the third person to do so. As a track and field athlete, he competed in the high jump and javelin throw, at times dashing over to the track to compete between innings of baseball games that he was playing in. He was a two-time unanimous All-American (1946 and 1947) and led Notre Dame to three national championships (1943, 1946, and 1947). In addition to winning the Heisman, Lujack was named the Associated Press Athlete of the Year. Category: American football players from Fort Pierce, Florida.

== Professional career ==
Lujack was paid $17,000 for his 1948 rookie season with the Bears and $20,000 for his fourth and final season. In his rookie season he played defensive back and kicker, during which he had eight interceptions for 131 yards and kicked 44 out of 46 extra points.

In the summer of 1949, Lujack starred in a radio program on ABC, The Adventures of Johnny Lujack, which was a summertime replacement for the Jack Armstrong, the All-American Boy show. It was a 30-minute program and broadcast on Monday, Wednesday, and Friday. The show was broadcast from the studios of WGN in Chicago over the Mutual Broadcasting System (MBS) and ran for 13 weeks.

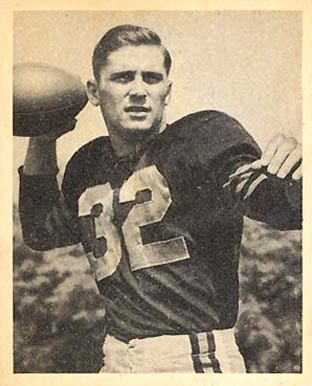
Lujack on a 1948 Bowman football card

In the final game of the 1949 season, the 9–3 Bears defeated their hometown rivals, the Chicago Cardinals (6–5–1), by a score of 52–21 on December 11. In that game, Lujack threw six touchdown passes and set an NFL record with 468 passing yards. The record was broken later by Norm Van Brocklin. He was the last Bears quarterback to throw at least five touchdown passes in a game until Mitchell Trubisky threw six against the Tampa Bay Buccaneers in 2018.

Sid Luckman and George Blanda played behind Lujack in the rotation at quarterback for the 1949 and 1950 seasons.

During the 1950 season, Lujack set an NFL record with 11 rushing touchdowns by a quarterback. This record was tied by Tobin Rote with the Green Bay Packers in 1956, and broken by the New England Patriots' Steve Grogan in 1976. Lujack, named to the 1950 All-Pro First-team, also set a Bears record for 109 total points in a season with 11 touchdowns, three (out of five) field-goals, and 34 (out of 35) extra points. That record was surpassed by Gale Sayers in 1965 with 132 total points.

== Post-playing career ==
After four years with the Bears, Lujack returned to Notre Dame as an assistant coach for 1952 and 1953 to repay Frank Leahy as a debt of gratitude for having given him a scholarship to Notre Dame. Leahy wanted Lujack to succeed him as the head coach of the Fighting Irish, but Terry Brennan was chosen instead by Reverend Theodore Hesburgh, the university president.

In 1954, he then went into the car dealership business with his father-in-law, at Lujack Schierbrock Chevrolet Company of Davenport, Iowa. He purchased his father-in-law's dealership interest in 1988. Sometime in late 2006, the dealership was sold by his former son-in-law to Smart Automotive.

Lujack served as a television color commentator for NFL games on NFL on CBS for several years, teaming with Ray Scott to call Green Bay Packers games in 1957 and with Chris Schenkel to call New York Giants games from 1958 to 1961. However, in 1962 when Ford signed on as a major sponsor and learned that Lujack was a Chevrolet dealer, he was replaced by Pat Summerall. He also worked with Jim McKay on CBS doing college football and on ABC college football telecasts in the late 1960s.

On June 8, 1978, Lujack was inducted into the National Polish-American Sports Hall of Fame.

In 2005, Lujack donated $50,000 to Connellsville High School toward a new field house for the football stadium. It was later named Johnny Lujack Field House. The Johnny Lujack Training Facility was formally dedicated in 2009 and he was also inducted into the inaugural class of the Fayette County Sports Hall of Fame.

== Personal life ==
His wife, the former Patricia Ann "Pat" Schierbrock (February 22, 1927 — August 2, 2022), was the daughter of Josephine (née Wilson) and Frank H. Schierbrock. Lujack and Schierbrock were married in Davenport, Iowa at the Sacred Heart Cathedral on June 26, 1948. They had three children: Mary, Jeff, and Carol (1954–2002).

Lujack was distantly related to NFL player Ben Skowronek and Olympic gymnast Courtney Kupets. NFL quarterback Trent Green married into the family.

Lujack died at a hospice in Naples, Florida, on July 25, 2023, at age 98.

== Career statistics ==
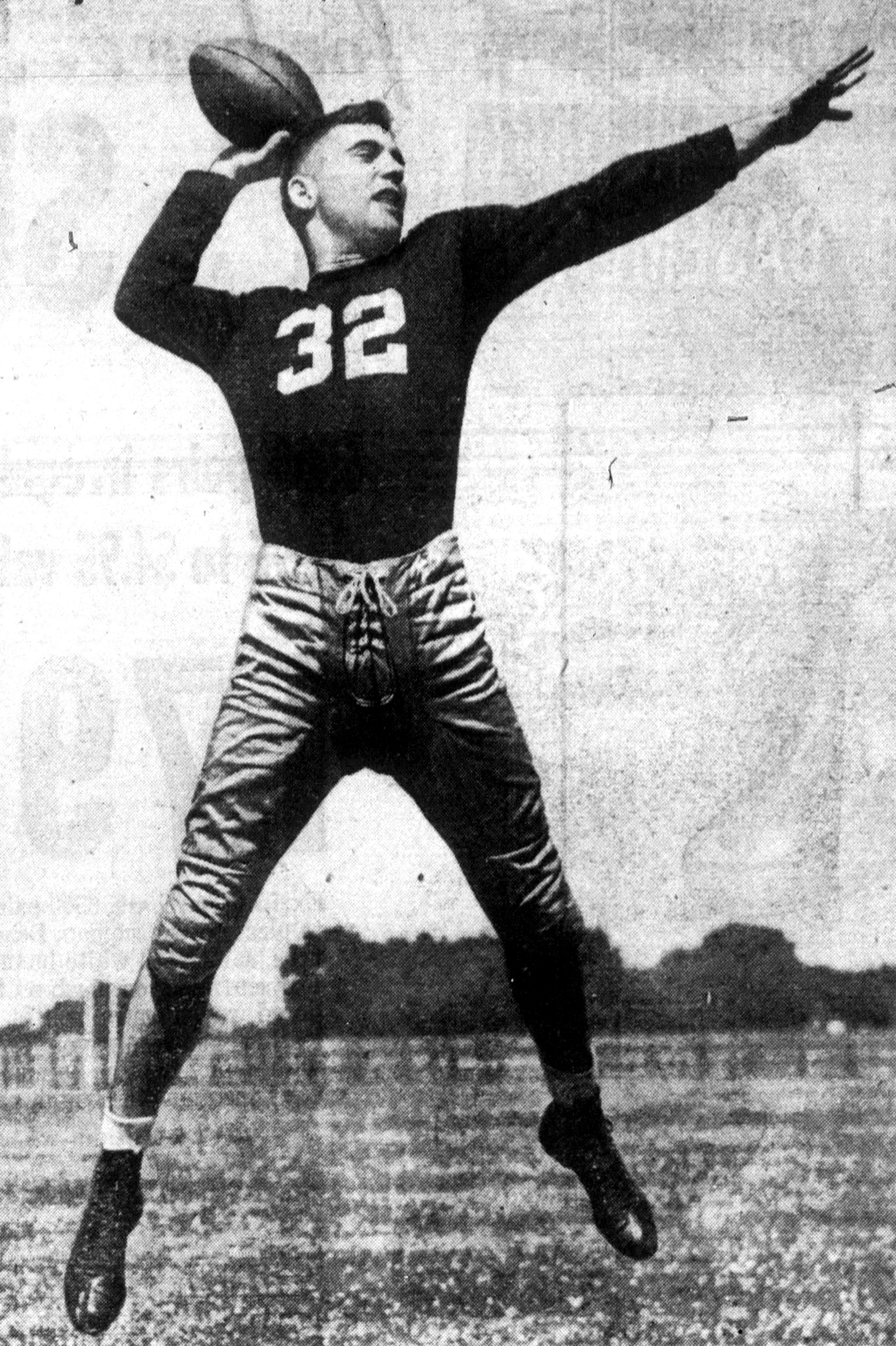
Lujack, circa 1947

=== College ===
Season	Team	Cmp	Att	Pct	Passing Yds	Passing TD	Int	Rtg	Rushing Yds	Rushing Avg
1943	Notre Dame	34	71	47.9	525	4	8	106.1	191	4.2
1946	Notre Dame	49	100	49.0	778	6	8	114.9	108	4.7
1947	Notre Dame	61	109	56.0	777	9	8	128.4	139	11.6

=== Professional ===
Year	Team	GP	GS	Record	Att	Cmp	Yds	TD	Int	Lng
1948	CHI	9	3	—	66	36	611	6	3	64
1949	CHI	12	7	—	312	162	2,658	23	22	81
1950	CHI	12	12	9–3	254	121	1,731	4	21	70
1951	CHI	12	6	4–2	176	85	1,295	8	8	78
Career		45	28	13–5	808	404	6,295	41	54	81
