= Earl Blaik =

American football player, coach, college athletics administrator and army officer

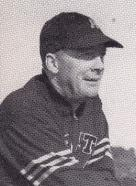

Biographical details
- Born: February 15, 1897; Detroit, Michigan, U.S.
- Died: May 5, 1989 (aged 92); Colorado Springs, Colorado, U.S.

Playing career
- 1915–1917: Miami (OH)
- 1918–1919: Army
- Position: End

Coaching career (HC unless noted)
- 1924–1925: Miami (OH) (assistant)
- 1926: Wisconsin (assistant)
- 1927–1933: Army (assistant)
- 1934–1940: Dartmouth
- 1941–1958: Army

Administrative career (AD unless noted)
- 1948–1959: Army

Head coaching record
- Overall: 166–48–14

Accomplishments and honors

Championships
- 3 national (1944–1946)

Awards
- Third-team All-American (1919); AFCA Coach of the Year (1946)
- College Football Hall of Fame; Inducted in 1964 (profile)

Earl Henry "Red" Blaik (February 15, 1897 – May 6, 1989) was an American football player, coach, college athletics administrator, and United States Army officer. He served as the head football coach at Dartmouth College from 1934 to 1940 and at the United States Military Academy from 1941 to 1958, compiling a career college football record of 166–48–14. His Army football teams won three consecutive national championships in 1944, 1945 and 1946. Blaik was inducted into the College Football Hall of Fame as a coach in 1964.

== Early life and playing career ==
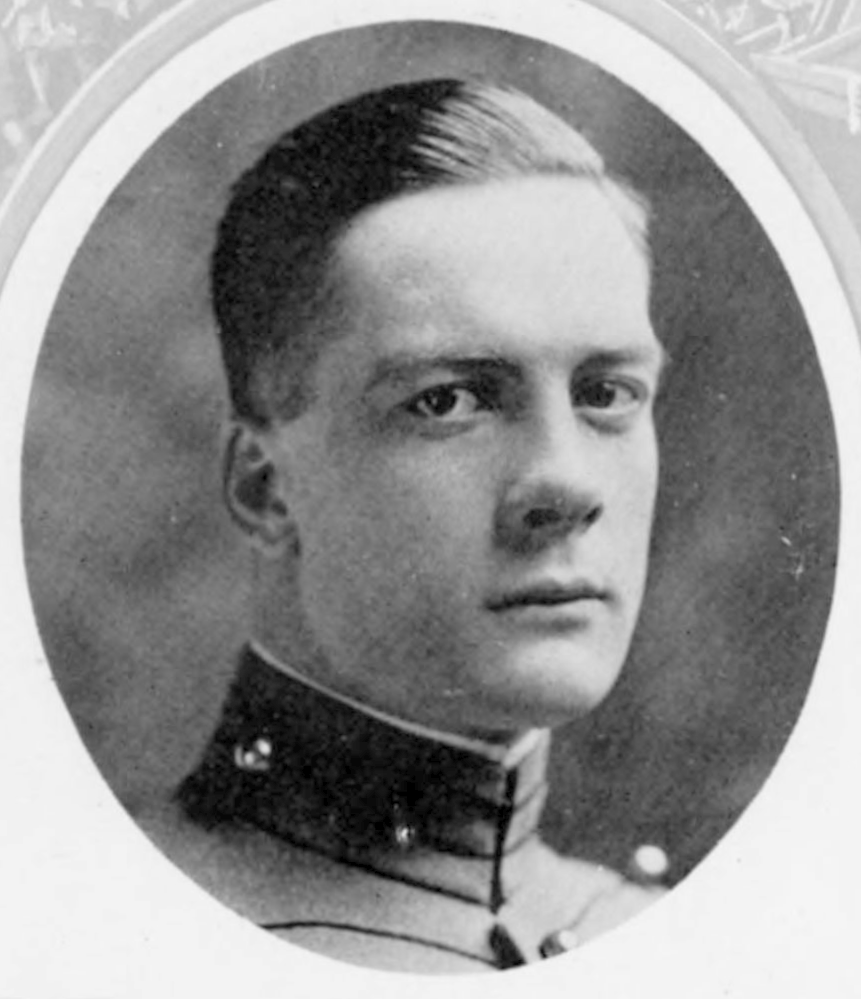
At West Point in 1920

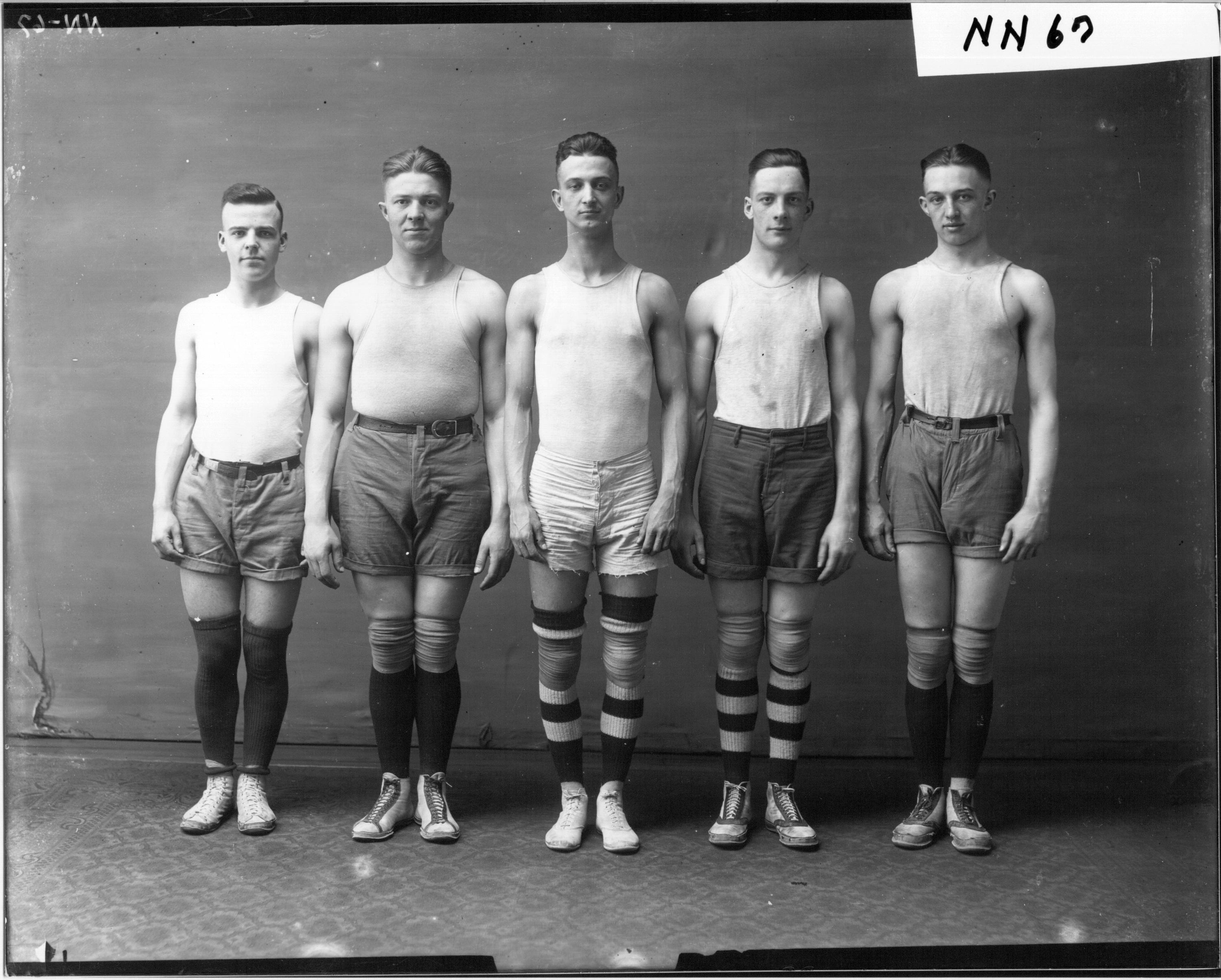
Miami University basketball team in 1917. Blaik is second from the right.

Blaik was born in Detroit, the son of William Blaik, a blacksmith and carriage maker who emigrated from Glasgow, Scotland in 1883. In 1901 the family moved to Dayton, Ohio, where his father became a contractor. He attended Steele High School.

He played college football for three seasons at Miami University in Oxford, Ohio, under Chester J. Roberts, George Rider and George Little and two seasons on the Army Cadets football team while attending the United States Military Academy (West Point), where he became a third-team All-American. Following his graduation in 1920, Blaik served in the United States Cavalry for two years. After his military service, Blaik married and worked in the construction business with his father.

In Bill Libby's 1973 book Champions of College Football, Blaik is identified as the most outstanding player in Army's 1944 and 1945 seasons. Army won national championship claims in both of the seasons.

== Coaching career ==
During the 1924 and 1925 seasons, Blaik worked as a part-time assistant coach for Miami University. For a few months in 1926, he accepted a coaching position on the staff of University of Wisconsin–Madison head football coach George Little. In 1927, Blaik became a part-time coach at the United States Military Academy until 1930 when he was accepted on the staff as a full-time assistant coach.

In 1934, Blaik was hired as head football coach at Dartmouth College. At Dartmouth he coached for seven seasons and compiled a record of 45–16–4. His Dartmouth teams had a 22-game unbeaten streak from 1934 to 1937. He coached one Hall of Fame player at Dartmouth, Bob MacLeod.

In 1941, Blaik was tapped to be head football coach for the United States Military Academy. Army had suffered two consecutive losing seasons in 1939 and 1940, a first since 1906, and dropped its requirements for its coach to be a serving graduate and that all players meet restrictive height-to-weight limitations. The latter was a condition Blaik made as a requirement for him to accept the position, believing Army to be severely handicapped in the size of its linemen. The United States Naval Academy did not have the same restrictions and the Army surgeon general was persuaded to drop the requirement for football players.

At West Point, Blaik coached for 18 seasons compiling a 121–32–10 record. Blaik's Army teams had a 32-game unbeaten streak from 1944 to 1947, won consecutive national titles in 1944 and 1945, and finished second in the nation in 1946 with their record blemished only by a scoreless tie with rival Notre Dame at Yankee Stadium. In 1946, Blaik was selected as the AFCA Coach of the Year. In 1948, he became one of the first college coaches to implement a two-platoon system, using players strictly for offense or defense. Blaik was also one of the first coaches to analyze the game play-by-play, charting a team’s tendencies on every down with the use of game film.

During his tenure at West Point, Blaik coached three Heisman Trophy winners, Doc Blanchard in 1945, Glenn Davis in 1946 and Pete Dawkins in 1958, as well as a total of 11 Hall of Fame players. Twenty of his former assistant coaches became head coaches: Paul Amen, George Blackburn, Chief Boston, Eddie Crowder, Paul Dietzel, Bobby Dobbs, Sid Gillman, Jack Green, Andy Gustafson, Dale Hall, Tom Harp, Herman Hickman, Stu Holcomb, Frank Lauterbur, Vince Lombardi, John Sauer, Richard Voris, Murray Warmath, Bob Woodruff, and Bill Yeoman. Fighter pilot Colonel Robin Olds also served as an assistant coach to Blaik. Dietzel, while at LSU, and Murray Warmath, while at Minnesota, won national championships as head coaches. Gillman, while head coach of the San Diego Chargers won an AFL championship. Lombardi, as head coach of the Green Bay Packers, won five NFL titles and the first two Super Bowls.

During Blaik's tenure, the Army team adopted the nicknames "Black Knights" and "Black Knights of the Hudson", which has now come to refer to all intercollegiate athletic teams at West Point.

Among his West Point players, Blaik was known for being a stern and disciplined coach. They nicknamed him "The Colonel."

== Later life and death ==
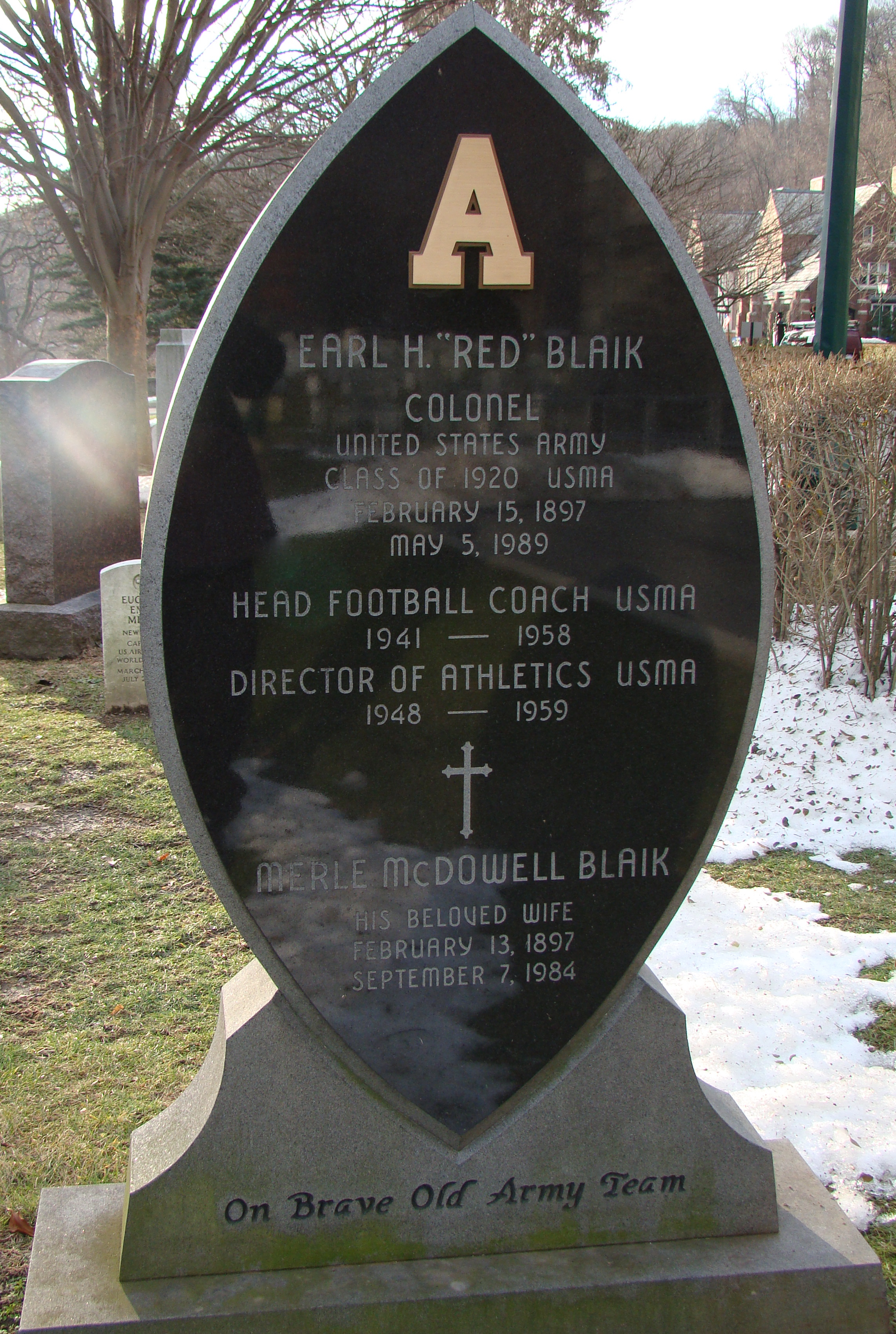
Red Blaik's tombstone at West Point

Blaik resigned as head football coach of Army on January 13, 1959, to become a vice president at the Avco Corporation. In 1964, he was inducted into the College Football Hall of Fame. His alma mater, Miami University honored him by induction into the university's Athletic Hall of Fame in 1969. Blaik received the Presidential Medal of Freedom from President Ronald Reagan in 1986.

Blaik died in 1989 at age 92 in Colorado Springs, Colorado. On September 25, 1999, the football field at West Point's Michie Stadium was named Blaik Field in his honor.

== Portrayal in media ==
In 2005, ESPN produced a television film called Code Breakers about the honor code scandal that plagued Blaik's 1951 team. In the film, Blaik is portrayed by actor Scott Glenn.

== Head coaching record ==
Year	Team	Overall	Conference	Standing	Bowl/playoffs	Coaches^{#}	AP^{°}
Dartmouth Indians (Independent) (1934–1940)
1934	Dartmouth	6–3					
1935	Dartmouth	8–2					
1936	Dartmouth	7–1–1					
1937	Dartmouth	7–0–2					
1938	Dartmouth	7–2					
1939	Dartmouth	5–3–1					
1940	Dartmouth	5–4					
Dartmouth:		45–15–4					
Army Cadets (Independent) (1941–1958)
1941	Army	5–3–1					
1942	Army	6–3					
1943	Army	7–2–1					11
1944	Army	9–0					1
1945	Army	9–0					1
1946	Army	9–0–1					2
1947	Army	5–2–2					11
1948	Army	8–0–1					6
1949	Army	9–0					4
1950	Army	8–1				5	2
1951	Army	2–7					
1952	Army	4–4–1					
1953	Army	7–1–1				16	14
1954	Army	7–2				7	7
1955	Army	6–3				15	20
1956	Army	5–3–1					
1957	Army	7–2				13	18
1958	Army	8–0–1				3	3
Army:		121–33–10					
Total:		166–48–14					
National championship Conference title Conference division title or championship game berth
^{#}Rankings from final Coaches Poll.; ^{°}Rankings from final AP Poll.
