= George Sullivan (American football, born 1926) =

American football player (1926–2016)

No. 37
- Position: End

Personal information
- Born: March 3, 1926; Norwood, Massachusetts, U.S.
- Died: December 30, 2016 (aged 90); Norwood, Massachusetts, U.S.
- Listed height: 6 ft 2 in (1.88 m)
- Listed weight: 205 lb (93 kg)

Career information
- High school: Walpole
- College: Notre Dame
- NFL draft: 1947: 6th round, 37th overall pick

Career history
- Boston Yanks (1948)

Awards and highlights
- 3× National champion (1943, 1946, 1947)

Career NFL statistics
- Games played: 1
- Stats at Pro Football Reference

George Albert Sullivan (March 3, 1926 – December 30, 2016) was an American professional football end who played in one game for the Boston Yanks in 1948. He played college football at University of Notre Dame, having previously attended Walpole High School.
