= Doc Blanchard =

American football player and coach (1924–2009)

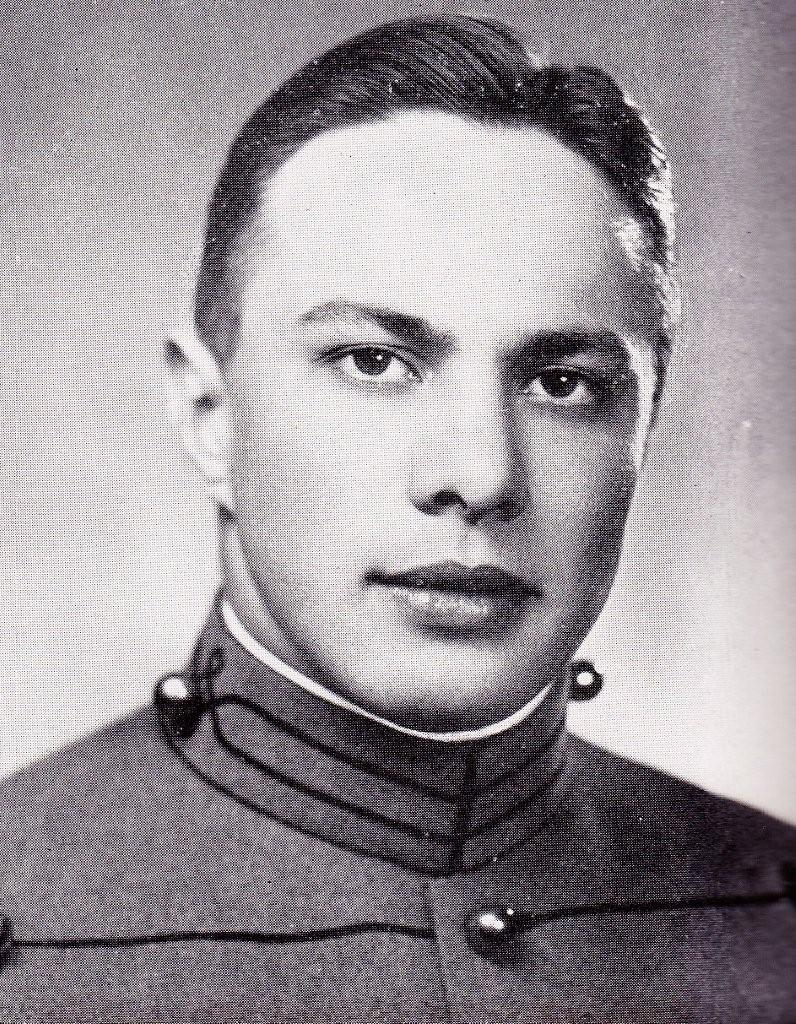
- 1947 West Point yearbook photo

No. 35
- Positions: Fullback, linebacker

Personal information
- Born: December 11, 1924; McColl, South Carolina, U.S.
- Died: April 19, 2009 (aged 84); Bulverde, Texas, U.S.
- Listed height: 6 ft 0 in (1.83 m)
- Listed weight: 205 lb (93 kg)

Career information
- High school: Saint Stanislaus (Bay St. Louis, Mississippi)
- College: North Carolina (1943); Army (1944–1946)

Awards and highlights
- 3× National champion (1944, 1945, 1946); 3× Eastern champion (1944–1946); Heisman Trophy (1945); Maxwell Award (1945); SN Player of the Year (1945); James E. Sullivan Award (1945); 2× Unanimous All-American (1945, 1946); Consensus All-American (1944); 3× First-team All-Eastern (1944–1946); Army Black Knights No. 35 retired
- College Football Hall of Fame

Other information
- Military career
- Allegiance: United States
- Branch: United States Air Force
- Service years: 1946-1971
- Rank: Colonel
- Unit: 77th Fighter Squadron
- Conflicts: World War II; Korean War; Vietnam War
- Awards: Distinguished Flying Cross

Felix Anthony "Doc" Blanchard (December 11, 1924 – April 19, 2009) was an American football player and serviceman who became the first junior to win the Heisman Trophy and Maxwell Award, and was the first football player to win the James E. Sullivan Award, all in 1945. He played football for the Army Cadets, where he was known as "Mr. Inside".

Because his father was a physician, Felix Blanchard was nicknamed "Little Doc" as a boy. After football, he was a fighter pilot in the U.S. Air Force, and served from 1947 until 1971, when he retired with the rank of colonel.

== Early life ==
Blanchard was born on December 11, 1924, in McColl, South Carolina. His father was a doctor and had played college football at Tulane University and Wake Forest University. The Blanchards moved from McColl, South Carolina, to Dexter, Iowa, in 1929. Two years later, they settled in Bishopville, South Carolina.

Blanchard, nicknamed "Little Doc", attended high school at Saint Stanislaus College in Bay St. Louis, Mississippi. He led the school's football team, the Rockachaws, to an undefeated season during his senior year in 1941. Blanchard was recruited to play college football by Army, Fordham University and the University of Notre Dame, among others. Blanchard said in 1985 that he had been contacted about going to West Point when he was in high school. He said, "At that point in time, I really wasn't interested. Academically, I never was too hot, so I never had any idea I would pass the entrance examination and go to West Point."

Instead, Blanchard chose to play for the University of North Carolina Tar Heels, in part because its coach, Jim Tatum, was his mother's cousin. Because NCAA rules at the time did not allow freshmen to play varsity, Blanchard played with the freshman team.

In 1943 after the United States became one of the Allies in World War II, Blanchard enlisted in the U.S. Army. He was stationed in New Mexico with a chemical-warfare unit until enrolling at West Point in July 1944 in an appointment his father secured.

== West Point years ==
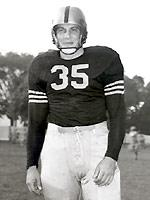
Doc Blanchard "Mr. Inside"

During his three years of playing football at West Point, his team under coach Earl "Red" Blaik compiled an undefeated 27–0–1 record – the tie being a famous 0–0 game against Notre Dame in 1946.

Notre Dame coach Edward McKeever was amazed by Blanchard. After his 1944 team lost to Army by a score of 59–0, McKeever said, "I've just seen Superman in the flesh. He wears number 35 and goes by the name of Blanchard."

An all-around athlete, Blanchard served as the placekicker and punter in addition to his primary roles as an offensive fullback and a linebacker on defense. He soon teamed with Glenn Davis on the 1944–45–46 teams (Davis won the Heisman in 1946, the year after Blanchard won it). They formed one of the most lethal rushing combinations in football history. In his three seasons at West Point, Blanchard scored 38 touchdowns, gained 1,908 yards and earned the nickname "Mr. Inside." Teammate Davis earned the nickname "Mr. Outside" and in November 1945, they both shared the cover of Time magazine.

In 1984, at the awards ceremony marking the 50th Heisman Trophy presentation, Blanchard took the occasion to recall, in comparison to the big glitzy shows for the ceremony today, how he learned of his Heisman selection in 1945. He said, "I got a telegram. It said, 'You've been selected to win the Heisman Trophy. Please wire collect.'"

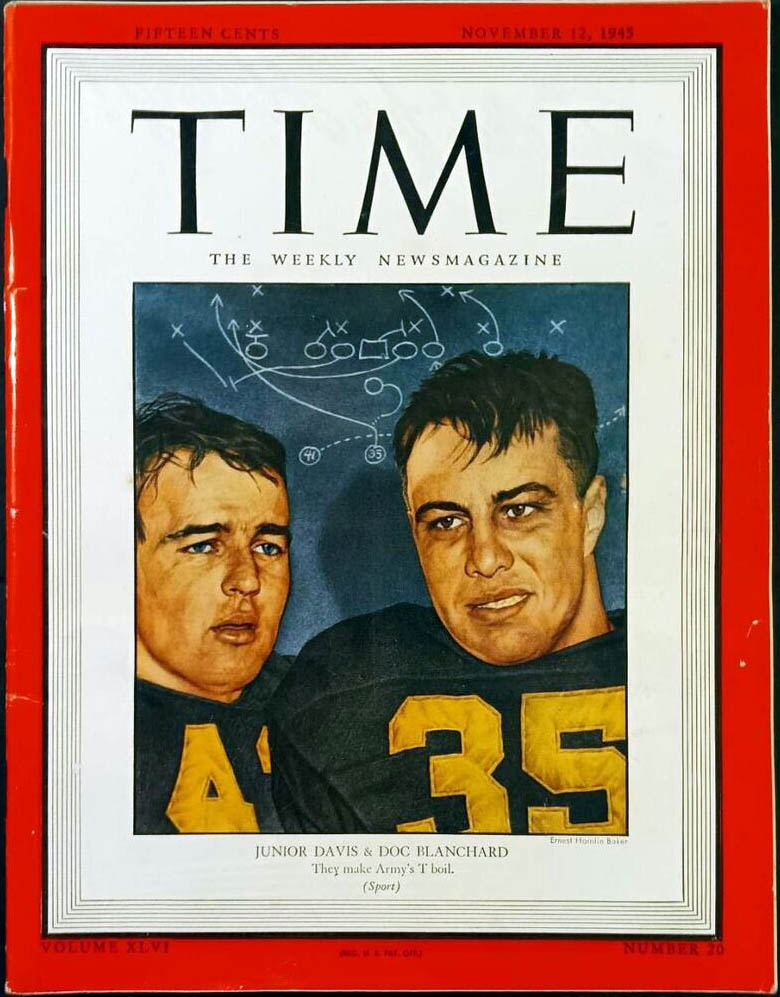
Blanchard (right) on the cover of Time, November 1945

In 1946, Blanchard missed the first two games of the season due to an injury to his knee. In June 1946 his class was divided into two classes (1947 and 1948) to transition back to a peacetime four-year curriculum from the wartime three-year curriculum instituted in October 1942. Both Blanchard and Davis were placed in the final three-year group, the Class of 1947 (Davis had entered West Point in July 1943 but was turned back a year in 1944 for a deficiency in mathematics).

In 1947, Blanchard played himself in the movie The Spirit of West Point. His West Point teammate Glenn Davis also played himself in the film. Other cast members include Robert Shayne as Coach Colonel Earl "Red" Blaik, Anne Nagel as Mrs. Blaik, George O'Hanlon as Joe Wilson, Michael Browne as Roger "Mileaway" McCarty, Tanis Chandler as Mildred, Mary Newton as Mrs. Mary Blanchard and William Forrest as Doc Blanchard's father, Dr. Felix Blanchard. Also appearing as themselves are 1940 Heisman Trophy winner Tom Harmon and sportscasters Bill Stern and Harry Wismer. The screenplay was written by Tom Reed based on a story by Mary Howard. Ralph Murphy directed.

In addition to football, Blanchard was also a member of the Army track and field team, with a shot put championship and a ten-second 100-yard dash in 1945.

In 1947, Blanchard graduated from West Point, 296th in order of merit among 310 graduates, and was commissioned as a second lieutenant in the U.S. Air Force. He coached Army's freshman team in the 1950s, but he never played professional football, choosing a military career instead.

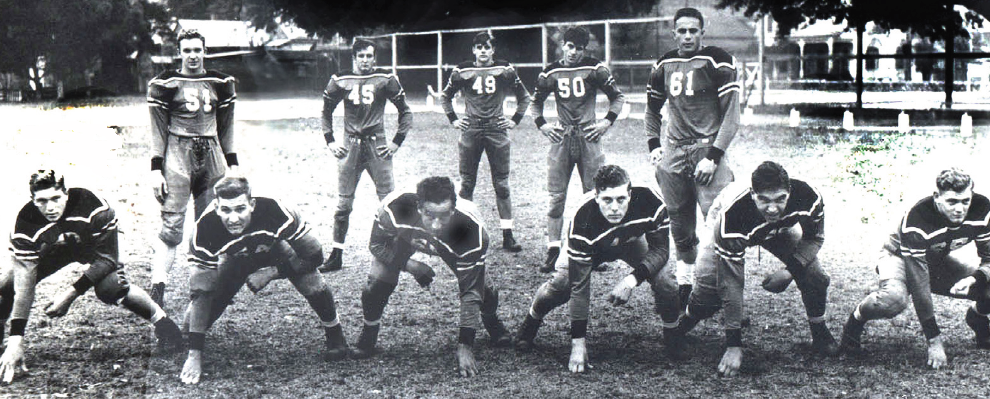
The 1941 Saint Stanislaus College prep school Gulf Coast championship Team. Doc Blanchard is No. 61.

== Military career ==
Blanchard had the opportunity to play professional football after being selected third overall in the 1946 NFL draft by the Pittsburgh Steelers. After he was turned down in 1947 for a furlough to play in the NFL, Blanchard then chose to embark upon a career in the U.S. Air Force, earned his pilot wings in autumn 1948, became a fighter pilot, and flew the F-80 Shooting Star.

In 1959, while with the 77th Tactical Fighter Squadron and flying back to his base at RAF Wethersfield near London, England, a fuel leak in Major Blanchard's F-100 Super Sabre broke and caught his plane on fire. Rather than escaping and parachuting out safely, he decided to stay with the plane and land it safely, because of a village on the ground that would have been damaged. This garnered him an Air Force commendation for bravery.

In the Vietnam War, Blanchard flew 113 missions from Thailand, 84 of them over North Vietnam, in the F-105 Thunderchief fighter-bomber during a one-year tour of duty that ended in January 1969. He retired from the Air Force in 1971 as a colonel, then spent several more years as the commandant of cadets at the New Mexico Military Institute, a junior college that prepares students to enter the service academies.

== Death ==
Blanchard died of pneumonia at age 84 on April 19, 2009, in Bulverde, Texas. He lived with his daughter Mary and her husband Aaron for the last fifteen years of his life. At the time of his death, he was the oldest living Heisman Trophy winner, and is interred at Fort Sam Houston National Cemetery in San Antonio, Texas.

== Honors and memorials ==
Blanchard was inducted into the College Football Hall of Fame in 1959.

At a 1990 ceremony, he presented his Heisman Trophy, Maxwell Award, James E. Sullivan Award, and jersey to his—and his father's—high school alma mater, Saint Stanislaus College prep school in Bay St. Louis, Mississippi. The trophy, awards and jersey were enshrined in the Brother Alexis Memorial Resource Center on the Saint Stanislaus campus until they were briefly lost to flooding during Hurricane Katrina. The items have since been recovered.

In Blanchard's honor, the Interstate 20 / U.S. Route 15 interchange near his hometown of Bishopville, South Carolina, has been named the Felix "Doc" Blanchard Interchange.

Beginning in 2004 the Rotary presents the Doc Blanchard Award as well as the Glenn Davis Award to the two high school football players participating in the U.S. Army All American Bowl who best exemplify the U.S. Army's high standard of excellence in community service, education and athletic distinction. The Doc Blanchard Award is given to a player from the Bowl's East team, while the Davis Award is given to a player from the Bowl's West team. The first recipient of the Doc Blanchard Award was Ryan Baker.

West Point announced in April 2009, before Blanchard's death, that Blanchard's number 35 would be retired, and it was on October 10 during a home game against Vanderbilt.

== See also ==
- List of NCAA major college football yearly scoring leaders
