= Fritz Barzilauskas =

American football player (1920–1990)

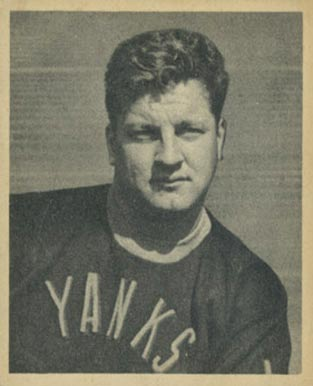
- Barzilauskas on a 1948 Bowman card

No. 36, 65
- Position: Guard

Personal information
- Born: June 13, 1920; Waterbury, Connecticut, U.S.
- Died: November 30, 1990 (aged 70); North Haven, Connecticut, U.S.
- Listed height: 6 ft 1 in (1.85 m)
- Listed weight: 230 lb (104 kg)

Career information
- High school: Crosby (Waterbury)
- College: Holy Cross (1939–1941); Yale (1945–1946)
- NFL draft: 1947: 1st round, 3rd overall pick

Career history
- Boston Yanks/New York Bulldogs (1947–1949); New York Giants (1951)

Awards and highlights
- First-team All-Eastern (1946)

Career NFL statistics
- Games played: 36
- Games started: 26
- Fumble recoveries: 3
- Stats at Pro Football Reference

Francis Daniel Barzilauskas (June 13, 1920 – November 30, 1990) was an American professional football guard who played four seasons in the National Football League (NFL) with the Boston Yanks/New York Bulldogs and New York Giants. He was selected by the Yanks with the third overall pick in the 1947 NFL draft. He played college football at the College of the Holy Cross and Yale University.

== Early life and college ==
Francis Daniel Barzilauskas was born on June 13, 1920, in Waterbury, Connecticut. He first attended Crosby High School in Waterbury, Connecticut before transferring to Cheshire Academy in Cheshire, Connecticut.

Barzilauskas attended the College of the Holy Cross from 1937 to 1939. His football career was interrupted by a stint in the United States Army Air Forces during World War II. He was shot down and held in a POW camp. Upon return home, Barzilauskas lettered for the Yale Bulldogs of Yale University from 1945 to 1946. He was named first-team All-Eastern by the Associated Press and International News Service his senior year in 1946. He was also named a Coaches third-team All-American in 1946 as well. Barzilauskas played in the Chicago Charities College All-Star Game in 1947.

== Professional career ==
Barzilauskas was selected by the Boston Yanks in the first round, with the third overall pick, of the 1947 NFL draft. He was also chosen by the Brooklyn Dodgers in the third round, with the 19th overall pick, of the 1947 AAFC draft. He chose to sign with the Yanks and played in five games, starting one, for the team in 1947. Barzilauskas appeared in all 12 games, starting ten, in 1948 and recorded two fumble recoveries. He appeared in all 12 games, starting ten, for the newly-renamed New York Bulldogs in 1949 and recovered one fumble.

Barzilauskas was selected by the New York Giants in the 19th round, with the 241st overall pick, of the 1950 NFL draft. He was released by the Giants later in 1950. He signed with the Giants again on June 5, 1951. Barzilauskas played in seven games, starting four, for the team during the 1951 season. He became a free agent after the season.

== Personal life ==
Barzilauskas coached Yale's freshman football team in 1950. He was later an administrator of the Yale athletic department's intramural program for 20 years.

Barzilauskas died on November 30, 1990, in North Haven, Connecticut, where he had lived since 1963. He was the uncle of NFL player Carl Barzilauskas.
