= Glenn Davis (halfback) =

American football player (1924–2005)

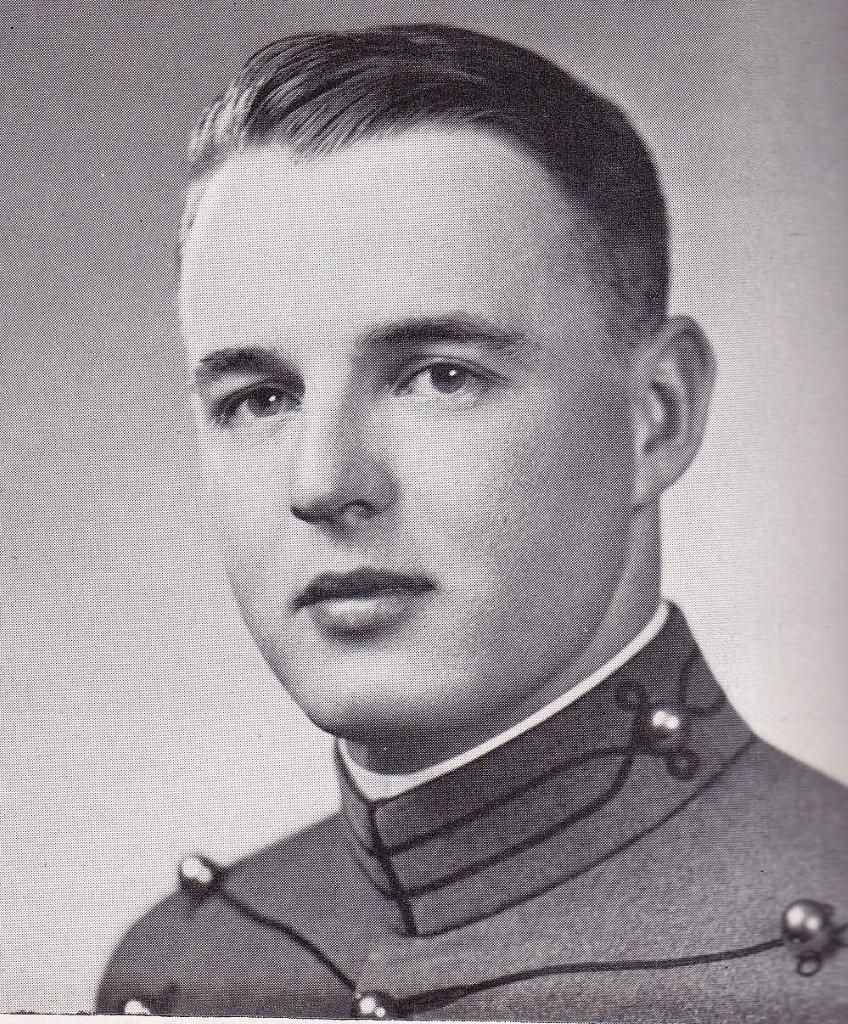
- Davis on the 1947 West Point yearbook

No. 41
- Position: Halfback

Personal information
- Born: December 26, 1924; Claremont, California, U.S.
- Died: March 9, 2005 (aged 80); La Quinta, California, U.S.
- Listed height: 5 ft 9 in (1.75 m)
- Listed weight: 175 lb (79 kg)

Career information
- High school: Bonita (La Verne, California)
- College: Army (1943–1946) (Note: It is disputed if he played for the Cal Poly Pomona Broncos.)
- NFL draft: 1947: 1st round, 2nd overall pick

Career history
- Los Angeles Rams (1950–1951)

Awards and highlights
- NFL champion (1951); Pro Bowl (1950); 3× National champion (1944, 1945, 1946); 3× Eastern champion (1944–1946); Heisman Trophy (1946); Maxwell Award (1944); SN Player of the Year (1946); AP Athlete of the Year (1946); 2× Unanimous All-American (1945, 1946); Consensus All-American (1944); 4× First-team All-Eastern (1943−1946); Army Black Knights No. 41 retired

Career NFL statistics
- Rushing yards: 616
- Rushing average: 4.1
- Rushing touchdowns: 4
- Receptions: 50
- Receiving yards: 682
- Receiving touchdowns: 5
- Stats at Pro Football Reference
- College Football Hall of Fame

Glenn Woodward Davis (December 26, 1924 – March 9, 2005) was an American football player who was a halfback. He won the Heisman Trophy in 1946 while playing college football for the Army Cadets. Known as "Mr. Outside", he played for Army from 1943 to 1946, receiving the Maxwell Award in 1944 and All-America honors three consecutive years from 1944 to 1946. The Cadets compiled a 27–0–1 record during Davis's three years as a varsity player and won the national championship each year. After completing his military service, Davis also played professionally for the Los Angeles Rams of the National Football League (NFL) in 1950 and 1951.

== Early life ==
Davis was born and raised in Southern California, the son of a bank manager. Glenn and his twin brother Ralph played high school football at Bonita High School in La Verne, California. In 1942, Davis led the Bearcats to an 11–0 record and the school's first-ever football championship, earning the Southern Section Player of the Year award. In 1987, Bonita High's stadium was dedicated in his name. The brothers were close and had originally planned to attend USC in Los Angeles, but when their U.S. Representative agreed to sponsor them with appointments to West Point, they decided to go there.

== College football career ==
At West Point, under coach Earl Blaik, Davis played fullback in his freshman season. Blaik moved him to halfback for his three varsity seasons, while Doc Blanchard took over at fullback. With Davis and Blanchard, Army went 27–0–1 in 1944, 1945, and 1946. Davis was nicknamed "Mr. Outside", while Blanchard was "Mr. Inside".

Davis averaged 8.3 yards per carry over his career and 11.5 yards per carry in 1945; both results are records which still stand today. Davis led the nation in 1944 with 120 points. He scored 59 touchdowns, including eight on his freshman squad, in his career. His single-season mark of 20 touchdowns stood as a record for 10 years.

Blanchard and he set a then-record 97 career touchdowns by two teammates. (The record was broken by USC backs Reggie Bush and LenDale White, who had 99 career touchdowns.) In 2007, Davis was ranked No. 13 on ESPN's list of Top 25 Players in College Football History.

For all three varsity years at West Point, Davis was a "consensus" All-America player (that is, selected by all the different groups picking All-America teams). In 1944, he won the Maxwell Award and the Walter Camp Trophy, and was runner-up for the Heisman Trophy. In 1945, he was again runner-up for the Heisman (won by his teammate Blanchard). In 1946, he won the Heisman and was named the Associated Press Male Athlete of the Year. In 1961, Davis was inducted into the College Football Hall of Fame.

Davis also starred in baseball, basketball, and track at West Point.

== After West Point ==
Davis graduated from West Point in June 1947 and entered the U.S. Army as a second lieutenant. He was offered a contract and $75,000 signing bonus by the Brooklyn Dodgers, but declined, as he was required to serve in the Army and would be a relatively old rookie after that.

In spite of Davis' service obligation, the Detroit Lions of the National Football League selected Davis with the second overall pick of the 1947 NFL draft, held in December 1946. In September 1947, the Los Angeles Rams acquired the rights to Davis from the Lions. He applied to resign his commission in December, but was refused by Secretary of the Army Kenneth Royall.

Davis was also denied extended furloughs or other accommodations that might allow him to play football while serving in the Army. There was public feeling that after the expense of his West Point education, he should not just go off to play football.

Davis (and Blanchard) did earn $25,000 each by appearing in the low-budget movie The Spirit of West Point (about their football careers). Davis tore a ligament in his right knee during filming.

Davis served three years in the Army. While on leave in 1948, he attended the Rams training camp and played in a preseason game. He then reported for duty in Korea (this was before the Korean War, which began after he returned to the U.S.).

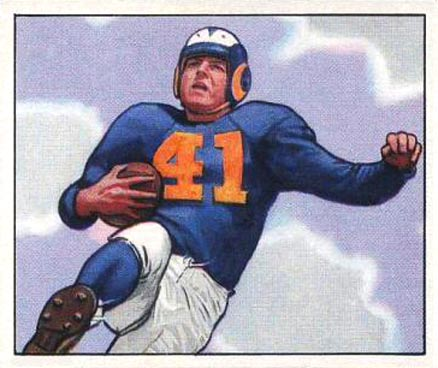
Davis depicted with the Rams in 1950

== Professional football career ==
Davis' service obligation ended in 1950, and he finally joined the Rams for their 1950 season.

Despite his knee injury, Davis was an effective player, and was even named to the 1950 Pro Bowl on the strength of his 42 catches for 592 yards as a receiver and 416 yards on 88 carries as a runner; he had seven total touchdowns. He scored the first touchdown of the 1950 NFL Championship Game on an 82-yard touchdown catch from Bob Waterfield; the Rams narrowly lost 30–28. In 1951, he injured his knee again, and he ran for a total of only 290 yards from scrimmage. He caught three passes for ten yards while running the ball six times for -6 yards in the 1951 NFL Championship Game, which Los Angeles won 24–17.

He did not play for the team in the 1952 season. In September 1953, the Rams released him, ending his professional career.

== Post-football life ==
Davis moved to Texas to work in the oil industry, but returned to California a few years later. He became special events director for the Los Angeles Times, organizing and directing the newspaper's charity fundraising events. He held this job until his retirement in 1987. The Times gave the annual Glenn Davis Award in his honor (not to be confused with the Glenn Davis Army Award).

== Personal life ==
Davis was married three times. In 1948, he dated actress Elizabeth Taylor. From 1951 to 1952 he was briefly married to film actress Terry Moore.

In 1953, Davis married Ellen Slack; they were married for 42 years, until her death in 1995. They had one son, Ralph. In 1996, Davis married Yvonne Ameche, widow of NFL star and fellow Heisman Trophy winner Alan Ameche. Davis was survived by his wife Yvonne, his son, Ralph, and a stepson, John Slack III.

Davis was sometimes confused with Olympic medal-winning athlete and Detroit Lions wide receiver Glenn Ashby Davis (1934–2009); the two men occasionally received each other's mail, but they never met.

== Death ==
Davis died of prostate cancer at La Quinta, California, at age 80 on March 9, 2005. He is interred in West Point Cemetery.

== See also ==
- List of NCAA major college football yearly scoring leaders
